= List of named minor planets: 150000–199999 =

This is a partial list of named minor planets in numerical order. It contains a total of 752 entries as of 19 October 2026. Minor planets for which no article exist are displayed in grey color and redirect to the list of minor planets (see List of minor planets § Main index).

== From 150,000 to 199,999 ==
- 150035 Williamson
- 150046 Cynthiaconrad
- 150081 Steindl
- 150118 Petersberg
- 150129 Besshi
- 150145 Uvic
- 150316 Ivaniosifovich
- 150374 Jasoncook
- 150520 Dong
- 151242 Hajós
- 151280 Valeriorizzo
- 151349 Stanleycooper
- 151351 Dalleore
- 151362 Chenkegong
- 151430 Nemunas
- 151590 Fan
- 151657 Finkbeiner
- 151659 Egerszegi
- 151697 Paolobattaini
- 151834 Mongkut
- 151835 Christinarichey
- 151997 Bauhinia
- 152067 Deboy
- 152146 Rosenlappin
- 152188 Morricone
- 152226 Saracole
- 152227 Argoli
- 152233 Van Till
- 152290 Lorettaoberheim
- 152299 Vanautgaerden
- 152319 Pynchon
- 152320 Lichtenknecker
- 152336 Nicolecarr
- 152337 Sakeenaburson
- 152341 Rupesnigra
- 152454 Darnyi
- 152472 Brendlé
- 152481 Stabia
- 152533 Aggas
- 152559 Bodelschwingh
- 152583 Saône
- 152641 Fredreed
- 152647 Rinako
- 152657 Yukifumi
- 152733 Vincenclesný
- 152750 Brloh
- 152830 Dinkinesh
- 152985 Kenkellermann
- 153078 Giovale
- 153284 Frieman
- 153289 Rebeccawatson
- 153298 Paulmyers
- 153301 Alissamearle
- 153333 Jeanhugues
- 153686 Pathall
- 154004 Haolei
- 154005 Hughharris
- 154006 Suzannehawley
- 154141 Kertész
- 154378 Hennessy
- 154493 Portisch
- 154554 Heatherelliott
- 154587 Ennico
- 154660 Kavelaars
- 154714 de Schepper
- 154865 Stefanheutz
- 154902 Davidtoth
- 154932 Sviderskienė
- 154938 Besserman
- 154991 Vinciguerra
- 154997 Marstream
- 154998 Anneadkins
- 155083 Banneker
- 155116 Verkhivnya
- 155138 Pučinskas
- 155142 Tenagra
- 155215 Vámostibor
- 155217 Radnóti
- 155270 Dianawheeler
- 155290 Anniegrauer
- 155438 Velásquez
- 155784 Ercol
- 155948 Maquet
- 155997 Robertaciani
- 156542 Hogg
- 156580 Madách
- 156631 Margitan
- 156751 Chelseaferrell
- 156879 Eloïs
- 156880 Bernardtregon
- 156939 Odegard
- 156990 Claerbout
- 157015 Walterstraube
- 157020 Fertőszentmiklós
- 157064 Sedona
- 157141 Sopron
- 157194 Saddlemyer
- 157258 Leach
- 157271 Gurtovenko
- 157301 Loreena
- 157332 Lynette
- 157396 Vansevičius
- 157421 Carolpercy
- 157456 Pivatte
- 157473 Emuno
- 157491 Rüdigerkollar
- 157494 Durham
- 157533 Stellamarie
- 157534 Šiauliai
- 157541 Wachter
- 157599 Verdery
- 157640 Baumeler
- 157693 Amandamarty
- 157721 Kölcsey
- 157747 Mandryka
- 157825 Zejda
- 157894 Yasminwalter
- 158092 Frasercain
- 158222 Manicolas
- 158241 Yutonagatomo
- 158329 Stevekent
- 158472 Tiffanyfinley
- 158520 Ricardoferreira
- 158589 Snodgrass
- 158623 Perali
- 158657 Célian
- 158899 Malloryvale
- 158913 Kreider
- 159011 Radomyshl
- 159013 Kyleturner
- 159102 Sarahflanigan
- 159164 La Cañada
- 159181 Berdychiv
- 159215 Apan
- 159351 Leonpascal
- 159409 Ratte
- 159629 Brunszvik
- 159743 Kluk
- 159776 Eduardoröhl
- 159778 Bobshelton
- 159799 Kralice
- 159814 Saguaro
- 159826 Knapp
- 159827 Keithmullen
- 159865 Silvialonso
- 159902 Gladstone
- 159974 Badacsony
- 159999 Michaelgriffin
- 160000 Lemmon
- 160001 Bakonybél
- 160013 Elbrus
- 160105 Gobi
- 160215 Haines-Stiles
- 160259 Mareike
- 160493 Nantou
- 160512 Franck-Hertz
- 160556 Greenaugh
- 160575 Manuelblasco
- 160903 Shiokaze
- 161092 Zsigmond
- 161207 Lidz
- 161215 Loveday
- 161230 Martinbacháček
- 161278 Cesarmendoza
- 161315 de Shalit
- 161349 Mecsek
- 161371 Bertrandou
- 161545 Ferrando
- 161546 Schneeweis
- 161585 Danielhals
- 161592 Sarahhamilton
- 161625 Susskind
- 161661 Bobbyclarke
- 161693 Attilladanko
- 161699 Lisahardaway
- 161715 Wenchuan
- 161750 Garyladd
- 161835 Barbmcclintock
- 161913 Hunyadi
- 161962 Galchyn
- 161975 Kincsem
- 161989 Cacus
- 162001 Vulpius
- 162002 Spalatin
- 162011 Konnohmaru
- 162035 Jirotakahashi
- 162059 Mészáros
- 162158 Merrillhess
- 162166 Mantsch
- 162173 Ryugu
- 162395 Michaelbird
- 162466 Margon
- 162500 Silvanodelbo’
- 162755 Spacesora
- 162937 Prêtre
- 162978 Helenhart
- 163119 Timmckay
- 163153 Takuyaonishi
- 163244 Matthewhill
- 163255 Adrianhill
- 163470 Kenwallis
- 163623 Miknaitis
- 163624 Moorthy
- 163625 Munn
- 163626 Glatfelter
- 163639 Tomnash
- 163640 Newberg
- 163641 Nichol
- 163693 Atira
- 163800 Richardnorton
- 163819 Teleki
- 164006 Thierry
- 164130 Jonckhèere
- 164207 Cardea
- 164215 Doloreshill
- 164268 Hajmási
- 164405 Fennell
- 164406 Akiyamatoshio
- 164518 Patoche
- 164536 Davehinson
- 164585 Oenomaos
- 164586 Arlette
- 164587 Taesch
- 164589 La Sagra
- 164676 Oliviabaraldi
- 164701 Horanyi
- 164791 Nicinski
- 164792 Owen
- 165067 Pauls
- 165167 Kikkawatsuneie
- 165192 Neugent
- 165347 Philplait
- 165574 Deidre
- 165612 Stackpole
- 165659 Michaelhicks
- 165694 Calosisbaragli
- 166028 Karikókatalin
- 166229 Palanga
- 166349 Rundell
- 166444 Lange
- 166570 Adolfträger
- 166614 Zsazsa
- 166622 Sébastien
- 166745 Pindor
- 166746 Marcpostman
- 166747 Gordonrichards
- 166748 Timrayschneider
- 166749 Sesar
- 166886 Ybl
- 166944 Seton
- 166974 Joanbinimelis
- 167010 Terracina
- 167018 Csontoscsaba
- 167113 Robertwick
- 167208 Lelekovice
- 167341 Börzsöny
- 167748 Markkelly
- 167852 Maturana
- 167855 Natalinistéphane
- 167875 Kromminga
- 167960 Rudzikas
- 167971 Carlyhowett
- 167976 Ormsbymitchel
- 168039 Eefalcoacosta
- 168126 Chengbruce
- 168203 Kereszturi
- 168211 Juliechapman
- 168221 Donjennings
- 168234 Hsi Ching
- 168261 Puglia
- 168321 Josephschmidt
- 168358 Casca
- 168531 Joshuakammer
- 168635 Davidkaufmann
- 168638 Waltersiegmund
- 168698 Robpickman
- 168767 Kochte
- 168948 Silvestri
- 169078 Chuckshaw
- 169184 Jameslee
- 169299 Sirko
- 169509 Jeffreyrobbins
- 169568 Baranauskas
- 169834 Hujie
- 170006 Stoughton
- 170007 Strateva
- 170008 Michaelstrauss
- 170009 Subbarao
- 170010 Szalay
- 170011 Szkody
- 170012 Anithakar
- 170022 Douglastucker
- 170023 Vogeley
- 170073 Ivanlinscott
- 170162 Nicolashayek
- 170193 Joanguillem
- 170306 Augustzátka
- 170395 Nicolevogt
- 170487 Mallder
- 170644 Tepliczky
- 170700 Marygoldaross
- 170879 Verbeeckje
- 170900 Jendrassik
- 170906 Coluche
- 170909 Bobmasterson
- 170910 Brandonsanderson
- 170927 Dgebessire
- 170995 Ritajoewright
- 171112 Sickafoose
- 171118 Szigetköz
- 171153 Allanrahill
- 171171 Prior
- 171183 Haleakala
- 171195 Richardgreen
- 171256 Lucieconstant
- 171381 Taipei
- 171396 Miguel
- 171424 Rudyfernández
- 171429 Hunstead
- 171433 Prothous
- 171448 Guchaohao
- 171458 Pepaprats
- 171465 Evamaria
- 171588 Náprstek
- 171624 Nicolemartin
- 172090 Davidmccomas
- 172191 Ralphmcnutt
- 172269 Tator
- 172315 Changqiaoxiaoxue
- 172317 Walterbos
- 172318 Wangshui
- 172425 Taliajacobi
- 172430 Sergiofonti
- 172505 Kimberlyespy
- 172525 Adamblock
- 172526 Carolinegarcia
- 172593 Vörösmarty
- 172734 Giansimon
- 172850 Coppens
- 172932 Bachleitner
- 172937 Pattysieck
- 172947 Baeyens
- 172951 Mehoke
- 172985 Ericmelin
- 172989 Xuliyang
- 172996 Stooke
- 173002 Dorfi
- 173032 Mingus
- 173086 Nireus
- 173094 Wielicki
- 173108 Ingola
- 173117 Promachus
- 173395 Dweinberg
- 173649 Jeffreymoore
- 173872 Andrewwest
- 173936 Yuribo
- 174281 Lonský
- 174361 Rickwhite
- 174362 Bethwillman
- 174363 Donyork
- 174364 Zakamska
- 174365 Zibetti
- 174466 Zucker
- 174515 Pamelaivezić
- 174567 Varda
- 174801 Etscorn
- 175017 Záboří
- 175046 Corporon
- 175109 Sharickaer
- 175152 Marthafarkas
- 175166 Adirondack
- 175203 Kingston
- 175204 Gregbyrne
- 175208 Vorbourg
- 175238 Nguyenhien
- 175259 Offenberger
- 175281 Kolonics
- 175282 Benhida
- 175301 Mathur
- 175365 Carsac
- 175397 Oumousangaré
- 175410 Tsayweanshun
- 175411 Yilan
- 175419 Albiesachs
- 175437 Zsivótzky
- 175450 Phillipklu
- 175451 Linchisheng
- 175452 Chenggong
- 175476 Macheret
- 175548 Sūdžius
- 175562 Ajsingh
- 175563 Amyrose
- 175566 Papplaci
- 175567 Csadaimre
- 175583 Pingtung
- 175586 Tsou
- 175588 Kathrynsmith
- 175613 Shikoku-karst
- 175625 Canaryastroinst
- 175629 Lambertini
- 175633 Yaoan
- 175636 Zvyagel
- 175718 Wuzhengyi
- 175726 Borda
- 175730 Gramastetten
- 175736 Pierreléna
- 175920 Francisnimmo
- 176014 Vedrana
- 176103 Waynejohnson
- 176380 Goran
- 176532 Boskri
- 176610 Nuñez
- 176710 Banff
- 176711 Canmore
- 176866 Kuropatkin
- 176867 Brianlee
- 176884 Jallynsmith
- 176981 Anteradonić
- 177065 Samuelnoah
- 177120 Ocampo Uría
- 177148 Pätzold
- 177157 Skoffelza
- 177415 Queloz
- 177625 Dembicky
- 177659 Paolacel
- 177667 Schieven
- 177722 Pelletier
- 177770 Saulanwu
- 177771 Bretz
- 177830 Rubenhagen
- 177853 Lumezzane
- 177866 Barrau
- 177967 Chouchihkang
- 177982 Popilnia
- 178008 Picard
- 178014 Meslay
- 178088 Marktovey
- 178113 Benjamindilday
- 178150 Taiyuinkwei
- 178151 Kulangsu
- 178155 Kenzaarraki
- 178156 Borbála
- 178226 Rebeccalouise
- 178243 Schaerding
- 178256 Juanmi
- 178263 Wienphilo
- 178267 Sarajevo
- 178294 Wertheimer
- 178383 Teruel
- 178534 Mosheelitzur
- 178603 Pinkine
- 178679 Piquette
- 178796 Posztoczky
- 178803 Kristenjohnson
- 178830 Anne-Véronique
- 178987 Jillianredfern
- 179221 Hrvojebožić
- 179223 Tonytyson
- 179411 Draganroša
- 179413 Stevekahn
- 179593 Penglangxiaoxue
- 179595 Belkovich
- 179647 Stuartrobbins
- 179678 Rietmeijer
- 179764 Myriamsarah
- 179874 Bojanvršnak
- 179875 Budavari
- 179876 Goranpichler
- 179877 Pavlovski
- 179901 Romanbrajša
- 180141 Sperauskas
- 180143 Gaberogers
- 180367 VonFeldt
- 180643 Cardoen
- 180739 Barbet
- 180824 Kabos
- 180855 Debrarose
- 180857 Hofigéza
- 180932 Luciegreen
- 180940 Bighornfire
- 181043 Anan
- 181136 Losonczrita
- 181241 Dipasquale
- 181249 Tkachenko
- 181279 Iapyx
- 181298 Ladányi
- 181392 Katonajózsef
- 181419 Dragonera
- 181483 Ampleforth
- 181494 Forestale
- 181518 Ursulakleguin
- 181562 Paulrosendall
- 181569 Leetyphoon
- 181627 Philgeluck
- 181661 Alessandro
- 181670 Kengyun
- 181702 Forcalquier
- 181751 Phaenops
- 181824 Königsleiten
- 181829 Houyunde
- 181872 Cathaysa
- 182044 Ryschkewitsch
- 182122 Sepan
- 182262 Solène
- 182590 Vladisvujnovic
- 182591 Mocescobedo
- 182592 Jolana
- 182674 Hanslmeier
- 182730 Muminovic
- 182786 Dankobosanac
- 182925 Jevremović
- 183114 Vicques
- 183182 Weinheim
- 183286 Sanjaklajić
- 183287 Deisenstein
- 183288 Eyer
- 183289 Krabbendam
- 183294 Langbroek
- 183357 Rickshelton
- 183403 Gal
- 183560 Křišťan
- 183635 Helmi
- 184011 Andypuckett
- 184064 Miner
- 184096 Kazlauskas
- 184275 Laffra
- 184280 Yperion
- 184314 Mbabamwanawaresa
- 184315 Denisbogan
- 184318 Fosanelli
- 184501 Pimprenelle
- 184508 Courroux
- 184535 Audouze
- 184620 Pippobattaglia
- 184778 Kevinoberheim
- 184779 Bericoberheim
- 184784 Bettiepage
- 184878 Gotlib
- 184930 Gobbihilda
- 185020 Pratte
- 185039 Alessiapossenti
- 185101 Balearicuni
- 185150 Panevėžys
- 185164 Ingeburgherz
- 185196 Vámbéry
- 185216 Gueiren
- 185250 Korostyshiv
- 185312 Yvonnemarschall
- 185321 Kammerlander
- 185325 Anupabhagwat
- 185364 Sunweihsin
- 185448 Nomentum
- 185484 Czochralski
- 185498 Majorcastroinst
- 185535 Gangda
- 185538 Fangcheng
- 185546 Yushan
- 185554 Bikushev
- 185560 Harrykroto
- 185561 Miquelsiquier
- 185576 Covichi
- 185577 Hhaihao
- 185578 Agustínelcasta
- 185579 Jorgejuan
- 185580 Andratx
- 185633 Rainbach
- 185636 Shiao Lin
- 185638 Erwinschwab
- 185639 Rainerkling
- 185640 Sunyisui
- 185641 Judd
- 185733 Luigicolzani
- 185744 Hogan
- 185757 Kareltrutnovský
- 186007 Guilleminet
- 186142 Gillespie
- 186411 Margaretsimon
- 186832 Mosser
- 186835 Normanspinrad
- 187123 Schorderet
- 187125 Marxgyörgy
- 187276 Meištas
- 187283 Jeffhopkins
- 187410 Anitabrockie
- 187447 Johnmester
- 187514 Tainan
- 187531 Omorichugakkou
- 187636 Chungyuan
- 187638 Greenewalt
- 187669 Obastromca
- 187679 Folinsbee
- 187680 Stelck
- 187700 Zagreb
- 187707 Nandaxianlin
- 187709 Fengduan
- 187805 Edoardoedo
- 187981 Soluri
- 188061 Loomis
- 188139 Stanbridge
- 188209 Solpera
- 188256 Stothoff
- 188446 Louischevrolet
- 188502 Darrellstrobel
- 188506 Roulet
- 188534 Mauna Kea
- 188576 Kosenda
- 188693 Roosevelt
- 188800 Emilyfurfaro
- 188806 Scottbednar
- 188808 Jessiewilde
- 188809 Philgroves
- 188816 Lajuanmoore
- 188822 Shoshanazweider
- 188847 Rhipeus
- 188867 Tin Ho
- 188894 Gerberlouis
- 188973 Siufaiwing
- 189000 Alfredkubin
- 189004 Capys
- 189011 Ogmios
- 189018 Guokeda
- 189035 Michaelsummers
- 189188 Floraliën
- 189202 Calar Alto
- 189261 Hiroo
- 189264 Gerardjeong
- 189310 Polydamas
- 189312 Jameyszalay
- 189320 Lakitsferenc
- 189347 Qian
- 189396 Sielewicz
- 189398 Soemmerring
- 189795 McGehee
- 189848 Eivissa
- 189930 Jeanneherbert
- 189944 Leblanc
- 189945 Teddykareta
- 189948 Richswanson
- 190026 Iskorosten
- 190057 Nakagawa
- 190139 Hansküng
- 190283 Schielicke
- 190310 De Martin
- 190333 Jirous
- 190504 Hermanottó
- 190617 Alexandergerst
- 190710 Marktapley
- 190730 Lorenzonesi
- 191282 Feustel
- 191341 Lánczos
- 191494 Berndkoch
- 191551 Glücklich
- 191582 Kikadolfi
- 191775 Poczobut
- 191856 Almáriván
- 191857 Illéserzsébet
- 191910 Elizawilliams
- 191911 Nilerodgers
- 192001 Raynatedford
- 192155 Hargittai
- 192158 Christian
- 192178 Lijieshou
- 192182 Ennedi
- 192208 Tzu Chi
- 192220 Oicles
- 192291 Palindrome
- 192293 Dominikbrunner
- 192353 Wangdazhong
- 192391 Yunda
- 192439 Cílek
- 192450 Xinjiangdaxue
- 192510 Pengkunchi
- 192515 Xinanjiaoda
- 192609 Orlaparker
- 192626 Glennunderhill
- 192686 Aljuroma
- 193158 Haechan
- 193736 Henrythroop
- 193818 Polidoro
- 194262 Nové Zámky
- 194837 Paolomasetti
- 194970 Márai
- 194982 Furia
- 195191 Constantinetsang
- 195405 Lentyler
- 195600 Scheithauer
- 195657 Zhuangqining
- 195772 Shirleygrace
- 195777 Sheepman
- 195853 Ouyangtianjing
- 195900 Rogersudbury
- 195998 Skipwilson
- 196000 Izzard
- 196005 Róbertschiller
- 196035 Haraldbill
- 196411 Umurhan
- 196476 Humfernández
- 196481 VATT
- 196540 Weinbaum
- 196640 Mulhacén
- 196736 Munkácsy
- 196772 Fritzleiber
- 196807 Beshore
- 196938 Delgordon
- 196945 Guerin
- 197189 Raymond
- 197192 Kazinczy
- 197196 Jamestaylor
- 197200 Johnmclaughlin
- 197449 Sarahwinfrey
- 197525 Versteeg
- 197707 Paulnohr
- 197708 Kalipona
- 197845 Michaelvincent
- 197856 Tafelmusik
- 197864 Florentpagny
- 197870 Erkman
- 198110 Heathrhoades
- 198450 Scattolin
- 198592 Antbernal
- 198616 Lucabracali
- 198634 Burgaymarta
- 198673 Herrero
- 198700 Nataliegrünewald
- 198717 Szymczyk
- 198820 Iwanowska
- 198963 Robsnyder
- 198968 Sparke
- 198971 Whitacre
- 198989 Valeriethomas
- 198993 Époigny
- 199194 Calcatreppola
- 199261 Cassandralejoly
- 199574 Webbert
- 199630 Szitkay
- 199631 Giuseppesprizzi
- 199632 Mahlerede
- 199677 Terzani
- 199687 Erősszsolt
- 199688 Kisspéter
- 199696 Kemenesi
- 199741 Weidner
- 199757 Shagunsingh
- 199763 Davidgregory
- 199838 Hafili
- 199900 Brunoganz
- 199947 Qaidam
- 199950 Sierpc
- 199953 Mingnaiben
- 199986 Chervone
- 199991 Adriencoffinet
- 199999 Nickgrossman
back to top

== See also ==
- List of minor planet discoverers
- List of observatory codes
- Meanings of minor planet names § Index
