= Meanings of minor-planet names: 179001–180000 =

As minor planet discoveries are confirmed, they are given a permanent number by the IAU's Minor Planet Center (MPC), and the discoverers can then submit names for them, following the IAU's naming conventions. The list below concerns those minor planets in the specified number-range that have received names, and explains the meanings of those names.

Official naming citations of newly named small Solar System bodies are approved and published in a bulletin by IAU's Working Group for Small Bodies Nomenclature (WGSBN). Before May 2021, citations were published in MPC's Minor Planet Circulars for many decades. Recent citations can also be found on the JPL Small-Body Database (SBDB). Until his death in 2016, German astronomer Lutz D. Schmadel compiled these citations into the Dictionary of Minor Planet Names (DMP) and regularly updated the collection.

Based on Paul Herget's The Names of the Minor Planets, Schmadel also researched the unclear origin of numerous asteroids, most of which had been named prior to World War II. This article incorporates text from this source, which is in the public domain: SBDB New namings may only be added to this list below after official publication as the preannouncement of names is condemned. The WGSBN publishes a comprehensive guideline for the naming rules of non-cometary small Solar System bodies.

== 179001–179100 ==
Named minor planet	Provisional	This minor planet was named for...	Ref · Catalog
There are no named minor planets in this number range

== 179101–179200 ==
back to top

Named minor planet	Provisional	This minor planet was named for...	Ref · Catalog
There are no named minor planets in this number range

== 179201–179300 ==
back to top

Named minor planet	Provisional	This minor planet was named for...	Ref · Catalog
179221 Hrvojebožić	2001 TP_{244}	Hrvoje Božić (born 1954) is a Croatian astrophysicist at Hvar Observatory and major contributor to the development of astronomy education in Croatia.	IAU · 179221
179223 Tonytyson	2001 TA_{257}	J. Anthony Tyson (born 1940), an American physicist and astronomer, who discovered distant, faint blue galaxies using CCDs in the 1970s. He was instrumental for the establishment of the Vera C. Rubin Observatory and directed the project for 15 years (Src).	IAU · 179223

== 179301–179400 ==
back to top

Named minor planet	Provisional	This minor planet was named for...	Ref · Catalog
There are no named minor planets in this number range

== 179401–179500 ==
back to top

Named minor planet	Provisional	This minor planet was named for...	Ref · Catalog
179411 Draganroša	2001 YM_{158}	Dragan Roša (b. 1958) is a solar astronomer and the director of the Zagreb Observatory. He has authored a number of textbooks for astronomy and astrophysics, and is a major contributor to the development of astronomy education and popularization in Croatia.	IAU · 179411
179413 Stevekahn	2001 YM_{161}	Steven Kahn (born 1954) is an American physicist and x-ray astronomer. On ESA's XMM-Newton space observatory, he was a principal investigator for the Reflection Grating Spectrometer (RGS). He was also a director of the Vera C. Rubin Observatory and led the construction of its large camera.	IAU · 179413

== 179501–179600 ==
back to top

Named minor planet	Provisional	This minor planet was named for...	Ref · Catalog
179593 Penglangxiaoxue	2002 LK_{61}	Penglang Elementary School (simplified Chinese: 蓬朗小学; traditional Chinese: 蓬朗小學; pinyin: Pénglǎng Xiǎoxué) is located in Kunshan City, Jiangsu Province, China. It was founded in 1906. It is located near to the Purple Mountain Observatory.	JPL · 179593
179595 Belkovich	2002 MK_{4}	Oleg Belkovich (1934–2020) is recognized worldwide for his work on the radar observations of meteors	JPL · 179595

== 179601–179700 ==
back to top

Named minor planet	Provisional	This minor planet was named for...	Ref · Catalog
179647 Stuartrobbins	2002 PG_{152}	Stuart J. Robbins (born 1983) is a Senior Research Scientist at the Southwest Research Institute. He served as a Science Team Planning Liaison for the New Horizons mission to Pluto.	JPL · 179647
179678 Rietmeijer	2002 QS_{66}	Frans J. M. Rietmeijer (born 1949), Dutch-American planetary geologist and research professor at the University of New Mexico	JPL · 179678

== 179701–179800 ==
back to top

Named minor planet	Provisional	This minor planet was named for...	Ref · Catalog
179764 Myriamsarah	2002 SC	Myriam Ory (born 1998) and Sarah Ory (born 2000), daughters of Swiss amateur astronomer Michel Ory who discovered this minor planet	JPL · 179764

== 179801–179900 ==
back to top

Named minor planet	Provisional	This minor planet was named for...	Ref · Catalog
179874 Bojanvršnak	2002 TS_{315}	Bojan Vršnak (born 1957), a Croatian astrophysicist at the Hvar Observatory and a professor of physics at the University of Zagreb, who has published textbooks on plasma physics and contributed to astronomy education in Croatia.	IAU · 179874
179875 Budavari	2002 TX_{328}	Tamas Budavari (born 1973), a Hungarian physicist with the Sloan Digital Sky Survey	JPL · 179875
179876 Goranpichler	2002 TS_{333}	Goran Pichler (born 1946), a Croatian physicist who contributed to the development of astronomy education and popularization in Croatia. He is also a fellow of the Croatian Academy of Sciences and Arts.	IAU · 179876
179877 Pavlovski	2002 TK_{340}	Krešimir Pavlovski (born 1954) is a Croatian astrophysicist and emeritus professor at the University of Zagreb, who has contributed to astronomy education in Croatia.	IAU · 179877

== 179901–180000 ==
back to top

Named minor planet	Provisional	This minor planet was named for...	Ref · Catalog
179901 Romanbrajša	2002 UA_{67}	Roman Brajša (b. 1963) is a leading astrophysicist at, and director of, the Hvar Observatory. He is a major contributor to the development of astronomy education and astrophysics in Croatia.	IAU · 179901

back to top

Preceded by 178,001–179,000	Meanings of minor-planet names List of minor planets: 179,001–180,000	Succeeded by 180,001–181,000
