= List of minor planets: 179001–180000 =

The following is a partial list of minor planets, running from minor-planet number 179001 through 180000, inclusive. The primary data for this and other partial lists is based on JPL's "Small-Body Orbital Elements" and data available from the Minor Planet Center. Critical list information is also provided by the MPC, unless otherwise specified from Lowell Observatory. A detailed description of the table's columns and additional sources are given on the main page including a complete list of every page in this series, and a statistical break-up on the dynamical classification of minor planets.

Also see the summary list of all named bodies in numerical and alphabetical order, and the corresponding naming citations for the number range of this particular list. New namings may only be added to this list after official publication, as the preannouncement of names is condemned by the Working Group for Small Bodies Nomenclature of the International Astronomical Union.

Near-Earth obj.	MBA (inner)	MBA (outer)	Centaur
Mars-crosser	MBA (middle)	Jupiter trojan	Trans-Neptunian obj.
Unclassified

== 179001–179100 ==
Designation			Discovery			Properties		Ref
Permanent	Provisional	Named after	Date	Site	Discoverer(s)	Category	Diam.	Ref
179001	2001 RA_{19}	—	September 7, 2001	Socorro	LINEAR	·	2.3 km	MPC · JPL
179002	2001 RN_{21}	—	September 7, 2001	Socorro	LINEAR	·	2.3 km	MPC · JPL
179003	2001 RV_{21}	—	September 7, 2001	Socorro	LINEAR	·	2.2 km	MPC · JPL
179004	2001 RZ_{23}	—	September 7, 2001	Socorro	LINEAR	·	2.5 km	MPC · JPL
179005	2001 RT_{25}	—	September 7, 2001	Socorro	LINEAR	·	1.3 km	MPC · JPL
179006	2001 RN_{31}	—	September 7, 2001	Socorro	LINEAR	EUN	1.7 km	MPC · JPL
179007	2001 RE_{37}	—	September 8, 2001	Socorro	LINEAR	RAF	1.2 km	MPC · JPL
179008	2001 RD_{40}	—	September 10, 2001	Socorro	LINEAR	EOS	2.8 km	MPC · JPL
179009	2001 RU_{42}	—	September 11, 2001	Socorro	LINEAR	·	2.3 km	MPC · JPL
179010	2001 RQ_{50}	—	September 11, 2001	Socorro	LINEAR	·	2.7 km	MPC · JPL
179011	2001 RF_{54}	—	September 12, 2001	Socorro	LINEAR	·	2.8 km	MPC · JPL
179012	2001 RH_{57}	—	September 12, 2001	Socorro	LINEAR	·	1.8 km	MPC · JPL
179013	2001 RL_{61}	—	September 12, 2001	Socorro	LINEAR	GEF	1.8 km	MPC · JPL
179014	2001 RK_{62}	—	September 12, 2001	Socorro	LINEAR	·	2.6 km	MPC · JPL
179015	2001 RH_{66}	—	September 10, 2001	Socorro	LINEAR	·	1.6 km	MPC · JPL
179016	2001 RA_{67}	—	September 10, 2001	Socorro	LINEAR	DOR	4.6 km	MPC · JPL
179017	2001 RQ_{67}	—	September 10, 2001	Socorro	LINEAR	·	2.5 km	MPC · JPL
179018	2001 RX_{77}	—	September 10, 2001	Socorro	LINEAR	·	3.3 km	MPC · JPL
179019	2001 RD_{83}	—	September 11, 2001	Anderson Mesa	LONEOS	·	2.4 km	MPC · JPL
179020	2001 RA_{85}	—	September 11, 2001	Anderson Mesa	LONEOS	·	3.4 km	MPC · JPL
179021	2001 RN_{85}	—	September 11, 2001	Anderson Mesa	LONEOS	·	2.2 km	MPC · JPL
179022	2001 RP_{89}	—	September 11, 2001	Anderson Mesa	LONEOS	·	3.5 km	MPC · JPL
179023	2001 RV_{90}	—	September 11, 2001	Anderson Mesa	LONEOS	·	2.7 km	MPC · JPL
179024	2001 RW_{90}	—	September 11, 2001	Anderson Mesa	LONEOS	MRX	2.2 km	MPC · JPL
179025	2001 RE_{92}	—	September 11, 2001	Anderson Mesa	LONEOS	·	3.1 km	MPC · JPL
179026	2001 RR_{92}	—	September 11, 2001	Anderson Mesa	LONEOS	·	3.4 km	MPC · JPL
179027	2001 RC_{99}	—	September 12, 2001	Socorro	LINEAR	·	2.0 km	MPC · JPL
179028	2001 RB_{107}	—	September 12, 2001	Socorro	LINEAR	·	3.0 km	MPC · JPL
179029	2001 RE_{110}	—	September 12, 2001	Socorro	LINEAR	·	1.8 km	MPC · JPL
179030	2001 RZ_{113}	—	September 12, 2001	Socorro	LINEAR	·	1.8 km	MPC · JPL
179031	2001 RP_{114}	—	September 12, 2001	Socorro	LINEAR	·	2.7 km	MPC · JPL
179032	2001 RD_{116}	—	September 12, 2001	Socorro	LINEAR	MRX	2.6 km	MPC · JPL
179033	2001 RG_{116}	—	September 12, 2001	Socorro	LINEAR	·	2.0 km	MPC · JPL
179034	2001 RL_{116}	—	September 12, 2001	Socorro	LINEAR	·	1.9 km	MPC · JPL
179035	2001 RB_{120}	—	September 12, 2001	Socorro	LINEAR	·	2.9 km	MPC · JPL
179036	2001 RJ_{125}	—	September 12, 2001	Socorro	LINEAR	·	3.4 km	MPC · JPL
179037	2001 RM_{135}	—	September 12, 2001	Socorro	LINEAR	ADE	2.8 km	MPC · JPL
179038	2001 RD_{137}	—	September 12, 2001	Socorro	LINEAR	·	2.5 km	MPC · JPL
179039	2001 RL_{146}	—	September 9, 2001	Anderson Mesa	LONEOS	·	3.0 km	MPC · JPL
179040	2001 RH_{151}	—	September 11, 2001	Anderson Mesa	LONEOS	·	1.6 km	MPC · JPL
179041	2001 SG_{7}	—	September 18, 2001	Kitt Peak	Spacewatch	·	3.1 km	MPC · JPL
179042	2001 SA_{10}	—	September 18, 2001	Desert Eagle	W. K. Y. Yeung	·	2.9 km	MPC · JPL
179043	2001 SL_{11}	—	September 16, 2001	Socorro	LINEAR	·	2.4 km	MPC · JPL
179044	2001 SF_{13}	—	September 16, 2001	Socorro	LINEAR	·	2.6 km	MPC · JPL
179045	2001 SJ_{13}	—	September 16, 2001	Socorro	LINEAR	·	2.4 km	MPC · JPL
179046	2001 SS_{14}	—	September 16, 2001	Socorro	LINEAR	·	2.5 km	MPC · JPL
179047	2001 SY_{15}	—	September 16, 2001	Socorro	LINEAR	·	1.4 km	MPC · JPL
179048	2001 SW_{18}	—	September 16, 2001	Socorro	LINEAR	·	3.0 km	MPC · JPL
179049	2001 SO_{19}	—	September 16, 2001	Socorro	LINEAR	(7744)	2.2 km	MPC · JPL
179050	2001 SR_{21}	—	September 16, 2001	Socorro	LINEAR	·	4.8 km	MPC · JPL
179051	2001 SV_{33}	—	September 16, 2001	Socorro	LINEAR	·	2.4 km	MPC · JPL
179052	2001 SN_{34}	—	September 16, 2001	Socorro	LINEAR	·	1.6 km	MPC · JPL
179053	2001 ST_{39}	—	September 16, 2001	Socorro	LINEAR	EUN	2.2 km	MPC · JPL
179054	2001 SL_{44}	—	September 16, 2001	Socorro	LINEAR	·	3.1 km	MPC · JPL
179055	2001 SE_{46}	—	September 16, 2001	Socorro	LINEAR	EUN	2.1 km	MPC · JPL
179056	2001 SC_{61}	—	September 17, 2001	Socorro	LINEAR	·	3.9 km	MPC · JPL
179057	2001 SP_{70}	—	September 17, 2001	Socorro	LINEAR	·	3.5 km	MPC · JPL
179058	2001 SU_{75}	—	September 18, 2001	Anderson Mesa	LONEOS	·	2.1 km	MPC · JPL
179059	2001 SP_{77}	—	September 19, 2001	Socorro	LINEAR	·	3.4 km	MPC · JPL
179060	2001 SG_{79}	—	September 20, 2001	Socorro	LINEAR	·	4.9 km	MPC · JPL
179061	2001 SZ_{88}	—	September 20, 2001	Socorro	LINEAR	·	2.6 km	MPC · JPL
179062	2001 SP_{94}	—	September 20, 2001	Socorro	LINEAR	KRM	3.3 km	MPC · JPL
179063	2001 SG_{96}	—	September 20, 2001	Socorro	LINEAR	AGN	1.6 km	MPC · JPL
179064	2001 SS_{96}	—	September 20, 2001	Socorro	LINEAR	·	2.1 km	MPC · JPL
179065	2001 ST_{99}	—	September 20, 2001	Socorro	LINEAR	·	2.5 km	MPC · JPL
179066	2001 SO_{104}	—	September 20, 2001	Socorro	LINEAR	·	4.7 km	MPC · JPL
179067	2001 SJ_{105}	—	September 20, 2001	Socorro	LINEAR	·	2.4 km	MPC · JPL
179068	2001 SB_{107}	—	September 20, 2001	Socorro	LINEAR	·	3.9 km	MPC · JPL
179069	2001 SQ_{117}	—	September 16, 2001	Socorro	LINEAR	·	2.7 km	MPC · JPL
179070	2001 SU_{117}	—	September 16, 2001	Socorro	LINEAR	·	2.5 km	MPC · JPL
179071	2001 SF_{122}	—	September 16, 2001	Socorro	LINEAR	·	3.3 km	MPC · JPL
179072	2001 SP_{123}	—	September 16, 2001	Socorro	LINEAR	·	2.4 km	MPC · JPL
179073	2001 SM_{125}	—	September 16, 2001	Socorro	LINEAR	·	2.7 km	MPC · JPL
179074	2001 SD_{126}	—	September 16, 2001	Socorro	LINEAR	·	3.5 km	MPC · JPL
179075	2001 SB_{131}	—	September 16, 2001	Socorro	LINEAR	·	2.5 km	MPC · JPL
179076	2001 SM_{133}	—	September 16, 2001	Socorro	LINEAR	·	3.1 km	MPC · JPL
179077	2001 SW_{144}	—	September 16, 2001	Socorro	LINEAR	BRA	1.7 km	MPC · JPL
179078	2001 SG_{145}	—	September 16, 2001	Socorro	LINEAR	·	3.0 km	MPC · JPL
179079	2001 SH_{146}	—	September 16, 2001	Socorro	LINEAR	·	2.6 km	MPC · JPL
179080	2001 SJ_{146}	—	September 16, 2001	Socorro	LINEAR	·	3.2 km	MPC · JPL
179081	2001 SK_{148}	—	September 17, 2001	Socorro	LINEAR	·	2.6 km	MPC · JPL
179082	2001 SR_{148}	—	September 17, 2001	Socorro	LINEAR	·	2.6 km	MPC · JPL
179083	2001 SW_{148}	—	September 17, 2001	Socorro	LINEAR	·	3.7 km	MPC · JPL
179084	2001 SY_{148}	—	September 17, 2001	Socorro	LINEAR	·	2.7 km	MPC · JPL
179085	2001 SM_{150}	—	September 17, 2001	Socorro	LINEAR	·	2.5 km	MPC · JPL
179086	2001 SH_{158}	—	September 17, 2001	Socorro	LINEAR	·	3.5 km	MPC · JPL
179087	2001 SR_{158}	—	September 17, 2001	Socorro	LINEAR	·	2.3 km	MPC · JPL
179088	2001 SE_{161}	—	September 17, 2001	Socorro	LINEAR	·	2.3 km	MPC · JPL
179089	2001 SC_{164}	—	September 17, 2001	Socorro	LINEAR	·	1.9 km	MPC · JPL
179090	2001 SK_{165}	—	September 19, 2001	Socorro	LINEAR	·	2.0 km	MPC · JPL
179091	2001 SG_{173}	—	September 16, 2001	Socorro	LINEAR	·	3.1 km	MPC · JPL
179092	2001 SD_{177}	—	September 16, 2001	Socorro	LINEAR	·	2.6 km	MPC · JPL
179093	2001 SG_{178}	—	September 17, 2001	Socorro	LINEAR	·	3.1 km	MPC · JPL
179094	2001 SA_{189}	—	September 19, 2001	Socorro	LINEAR	·	1.5 km	MPC · JPL
179095	2001 SR_{190}	—	September 19, 2001	Socorro	LINEAR	HOF	3.9 km	MPC · JPL
179096	2001 SX_{195}	—	September 19, 2001	Socorro	LINEAR	·	1.8 km	MPC · JPL
179097	2001 SG_{197}	—	September 19, 2001	Socorro	LINEAR	·	2.4 km	MPC · JPL
179098	2001 SY_{199}	—	September 19, 2001	Socorro	LINEAR	·	2.1 km	MPC · JPL
179099	2001 SH_{202}	—	September 19, 2001	Socorro	LINEAR	·	1.7 km	MPC · JPL
179100	2001 SS_{202}	—	September 19, 2001	Socorro	LINEAR	·	2.7 km	MPC · JPL

== 179101–179200 ==
back to top

Designation			Discovery			Properties		Ref
Permanent	Provisional	Named after	Date	Site	Discoverer(s)	Category	Diam.	Ref
179101	2001 SQ_{205}	—	September 19, 2001	Socorro	LINEAR	·	2.0 km	MPC · JPL
179102	2001 SH_{206}	—	September 19, 2001	Socorro	LINEAR	·	2.1 km	MPC · JPL
179103	2001 SY_{206}	—	September 19, 2001	Socorro	LINEAR	MAR	1.6 km	MPC · JPL
179104	2001 SP_{210}	—	September 19, 2001	Socorro	LINEAR	·	2.6 km	MPC · JPL
179105	2001 SC_{211}	—	September 19, 2001	Socorro	LINEAR	·	2.1 km	MPC · JPL
179106	2001 SC_{214}	—	September 19, 2001	Socorro	LINEAR	·	2.4 km	MPC · JPL
179107	2001 SP_{219}	—	September 19, 2001	Socorro	LINEAR	AST	2.9 km	MPC · JPL
179108	2001 SY_{235}	—	September 19, 2001	Socorro	LINEAR	·	2.1 km	MPC · JPL
179109	2001 SQ_{236}	—	September 19, 2001	Socorro	LINEAR	·	2.3 km	MPC · JPL
179110	2001 SP_{237}	—	September 19, 2001	Socorro	LINEAR	·	3.5 km	MPC · JPL
179111	2001 SF_{238}	—	September 19, 2001	Socorro	LINEAR	·	2.9 km	MPC · JPL
179112	2001 SD_{240}	—	September 19, 2001	Socorro	LINEAR	·	2.5 km	MPC · JPL
179113	2001 SK_{241}	—	September 19, 2001	Socorro	LINEAR	·	2.4 km	MPC · JPL
179114	2001 SE_{243}	—	September 19, 2001	Socorro	LINEAR	·	1.4 km	MPC · JPL
179115	2001 SP_{243}	—	September 19, 2001	Socorro	LINEAR	·	3.0 km	MPC · JPL
179116	2001 SH_{245}	—	September 19, 2001	Socorro	LINEAR	HOF	4.3 km	MPC · JPL
179117	2001 SK_{249}	—	September 19, 2001	Socorro	LINEAR	·	3.0 km	MPC · JPL
179118	2001 SU_{249}	—	September 19, 2001	Socorro	LINEAR	slow	3.1 km	MPC · JPL
179119	2001 SN_{250}	—	September 19, 2001	Socorro	LINEAR	(5)	1.8 km	MPC · JPL
179120	2001 SZ_{253}	—	September 19, 2001	Socorro	LINEAR	·	4.5 km	MPC · JPL
179121	2001 SL_{255}	—	September 19, 2001	Socorro	LINEAR	·	3.4 km	MPC · JPL
179122	2001 SJ_{257}	—	September 19, 2001	Socorro	LINEAR	EUN	2.9 km	MPC · JPL
179123	2001 SX_{257}	—	September 20, 2001	Socorro	LINEAR	HOF	4.5 km	MPC · JPL
179124	2001 SU_{265}	—	September 25, 2001	Desert Eagle	W. K. Y. Yeung	·	2.5 km	MPC · JPL
179125	2001 SP_{269}	—	September 19, 2001	Kitt Peak	Spacewatch	·	2.6 km	MPC · JPL
179126	2001 SC_{271}	—	September 20, 2001	Socorro	LINEAR	EUN	1.7 km	MPC · JPL
179127	2001 SR_{272}	—	September 21, 2001	Socorro	LINEAR	·	3.3 km	MPC · JPL
179128	2001 SD_{276}	—	September 26, 2001	Socorro	LINEAR	H	1.1 km	MPC · JPL
179129	2001 SQ_{278}	—	September 21, 2001	Anderson Mesa	LONEOS	H	1.0 km	MPC · JPL
179130	2001 SM_{282}	—	September 21, 2001	Socorro	LINEAR	·	1.9 km	MPC · JPL
179131	2001 SY_{286}	—	September 22, 2001	Palomar	NEAT	·	2.4 km	MPC · JPL
179132	2001 SM_{292}	—	September 16, 2001	Socorro	LINEAR	WIT	1.5 km	MPC · JPL
179133	2001 SF_{293}	—	September 19, 2001	Socorro	LINEAR	L5	10 km	MPC · JPL
179134	2001 SW_{296}	—	September 20, 2001	Socorro	LINEAR	·	1.8 km	MPC · JPL
179135	2001 SL_{301}	—	September 20, 2001	Socorro	LINEAR	·	2.8 km	MPC · JPL
179136	2001 SE_{303}	—	September 20, 2001	Socorro	LINEAR	·	2.6 km	MPC · JPL
179137	2001 SV_{305}	—	September 20, 2001	Socorro	LINEAR	·	2.0 km	MPC · JPL
179138	2001 SU_{316}	—	September 18, 2001	Anderson Mesa	LONEOS	EOS	2.9 km	MPC · JPL
179139	2001 SK_{319}	—	September 21, 2001	Socorro	LINEAR	·	2.4 km	MPC · JPL
179140	2001 SU_{319}	—	September 21, 2001	Socorro	LINEAR	·	2.3 km	MPC · JPL
179141	2001 SQ_{325}	—	September 17, 2001	Kitt Peak	Spacewatch	·	3.2 km	MPC · JPL
179142	2001 SN_{327}	—	September 18, 2001	Palomar	NEAT	·	6.4 km	MPC · JPL
179143	2001 SP_{343}	—	September 22, 2001	Palomar	NEAT	·	3.1 km	MPC · JPL
179144	2001 SS_{344}	—	September 23, 2001	Palomar	NEAT	GEF	2.5 km	MPC · JPL
179145	2001 SZ_{347}	—	September 26, 2001	Anderson Mesa	LONEOS	·	1.7 km	MPC · JPL
179146	2001 SJ_{353}	—	September 20, 2001	Socorro	LINEAR	HOF	3.1 km	MPC · JPL
179147	2001 TH_{11}	—	October 13, 2001	Socorro	LINEAR	LEO	4.0 km	MPC · JPL
179148	2001 TD_{15}	—	October 11, 2001	Palomar	NEAT	DOR	4.8 km	MPC · JPL
179149	2001 TT_{16}	—	October 11, 2001	Socorro	LINEAR	H	890 m	MPC · JPL
179150	2001 TB_{20}	—	October 9, 2001	Socorro	LINEAR	·	5.5 km	MPC · JPL
179151	2001 TD_{21}	—	October 9, 2001	Socorro	LINEAR	·	2.3 km	MPC · JPL
179152	2001 TG_{22}	—	October 13, 2001	Socorro	LINEAR	·	2.5 km	MPC · JPL
179153	2001 TO_{23}	—	October 14, 2001	Socorro	LINEAR	·	2.0 km	MPC · JPL
179154	2001 TG_{25}	—	October 14, 2001	Socorro	LINEAR	·	2.5 km	MPC · JPL
179155	2001 TU_{29}	—	October 14, 2001	Socorro	LINEAR	EUN	1.6 km	MPC · JPL
179156	2001 TV_{30}	—	October 14, 2001	Socorro	LINEAR	·	2.8 km	MPC · JPL
179157	2001 TX_{31}	—	October 14, 2001	Socorro	LINEAR	DOR	4.5 km	MPC · JPL
179158	2001 TZ_{34}	—	October 14, 2001	Socorro	LINEAR	·	3.8 km	MPC · JPL
179159	2001 TF_{48}	—	October 9, 2001	Kitt Peak	Spacewatch	·	2.8 km	MPC · JPL
179160	2001 TZ_{55}	—	October 15, 2001	Socorro	LINEAR	AGN	1.9 km	MPC · JPL
179161	2001 TF_{58}	—	October 13, 2001	Socorro	LINEAR	·	2.4 km	MPC · JPL
179162	2001 TZ_{58}	—	October 13, 2001	Socorro	LINEAR	·	2.5 km	MPC · JPL
179163	2001 TJ_{69}	—	October 13, 2001	Socorro	LINEAR	·	3.1 km	MPC · JPL
179164	2001 TE_{73}	—	October 13, 2001	Socorro	LINEAR	·	4.5 km	MPC · JPL
179165	2001 TL_{73}	—	October 13, 2001	Socorro	LINEAR	·	5.4 km	MPC · JPL
179166	2001 TZ_{74}	—	October 13, 2001	Socorro	LINEAR	·	4.0 km	MPC · JPL
179167	2001 TC_{78}	—	October 13, 2001	Socorro	LINEAR	·	3.4 km	MPC · JPL
179168	2001 TX_{83}	—	October 14, 2001	Socorro	LINEAR	·	3.2 km	MPC · JPL
179169	2001 TA_{89}	—	October 14, 2001	Socorro	LINEAR	·	3.0 km	MPC · JPL
179170	2001 TD_{91}	—	October 14, 2001	Socorro	LINEAR	EOS	3.0 km	MPC · JPL
179171	2001 TF_{91}	—	October 14, 2001	Socorro	LINEAR	·	3.8 km	MPC · JPL
179172	2001 TK_{94}	—	October 14, 2001	Socorro	LINEAR	·	3.1 km	MPC · JPL
179173	2001 TP_{104}	—	October 13, 2001	Socorro	LINEAR	·	2.4 km	MPC · JPL
179174	2001 TR_{108}	—	October 14, 2001	Socorro	LINEAR	·	2.0 km	MPC · JPL
179175	2001 TC_{110}	—	October 14, 2001	Socorro	LINEAR	·	2.5 km	MPC · JPL
179176	2001 TA_{114}	—	October 14, 2001	Socorro	LINEAR	·	3.1 km	MPC · JPL
179177	2001 TB_{120}	—	October 15, 2001	Socorro	LINEAR	EUN	2.4 km	MPC · JPL
179178	2001 TC_{121}	—	October 15, 2001	Socorro	LINEAR	·	5.1 km	MPC · JPL
179179	2001 TF_{123}	—	October 6, 2001	Palomar	NEAT	H	1.1 km	MPC · JPL
179180	2001 TK_{126}	—	October 13, 2001	Kitt Peak	Spacewatch	·	1.9 km	MPC · JPL
179181	2001 TE_{135}	—	October 13, 2001	Palomar	NEAT	·	2.2 km	MPC · JPL
179182	2001 TS_{135}	—	October 13, 2001	Palomar	NEAT	·	2.8 km	MPC · JPL
179183	2001 TB_{140}	—	October 10, 2001	Palomar	NEAT	WIT	1.4 km	MPC · JPL
179184	2001 TT_{144}	—	October 10, 2001	Palomar	NEAT	·	3.8 km	MPC · JPL
179185	2001 TW_{144}	—	October 10, 2001	Palomar	NEAT	·	3.4 km	MPC · JPL
179186	2001 TL_{146}	—	October 10, 2001	Palomar	NEAT	·	2.6 km	MPC · JPL
179187	2001 TY_{147}	—	October 10, 2001	Palomar	NEAT	·	2.3 km	MPC · JPL
179188	2001 TD_{150}	—	October 10, 2001	Palomar	NEAT	·	2.7 km	MPC · JPL
179189	2001 TU_{151}	—	October 10, 2001	Palomar	NEAT	·	3.0 km	MPC · JPL
179190	2001 TS_{154}	—	October 15, 2001	Palomar	NEAT	L5	16 km	MPC · JPL
179191	2001 TV_{155}	—	October 14, 2001	Kitt Peak	Spacewatch	KOR	1.5 km	MPC · JPL
179192	2001 TN_{162}	—	October 11, 2001	Palomar	NEAT	·	2.0 km	MPC · JPL
179193	2001 TC_{163}	—	October 11, 2001	Palomar	NEAT	·	2.2 km	MPC · JPL
179194	2001 TN_{163}	—	October 11, 2001	Palomar	NEAT	·	2.4 km	MPC · JPL
179195	2001 TP_{163}	—	October 11, 2001	Palomar	NEAT	WIT	1.3 km	MPC · JPL
179196	2001 TE_{164}	—	October 11, 2001	Palomar	NEAT	·	2.8 km	MPC · JPL
179197	2001 TC_{172}	—	October 13, 2001	Socorro	LINEAR	·	2.6 km	MPC · JPL
179198	2001 TZ_{172}	—	October 13, 2001	Socorro	LINEAR	·	2.3 km	MPC · JPL
179199	2001 TH_{175}	—	October 14, 2001	Socorro	LINEAR	·	2.6 km	MPC · JPL
179200	2001 TU_{175}	—	October 14, 2001	Socorro	LINEAR	·	2.6 km	MPC · JPL

== 179201–179300 ==
back to top

Designation			Discovery			Properties		Ref
Permanent	Provisional	Named after	Date	Site	Discoverer(s)	Category	Diam.	Ref
179201	2001 TE_{178}	—	October 14, 2001	Socorro	LINEAR	·	3.0 km	MPC · JPL
179202	2001 TL_{179}	—	October 14, 2001	Socorro	LINEAR	·	3.2 km	MPC · JPL
179203	2001 TA_{185}	—	October 14, 2001	Socorro	LINEAR	·	2.7 km	MPC · JPL
179204	2001 TD_{185}	—	October 14, 2001	Socorro	LINEAR	·	3.4 km	MPC · JPL
179205	2001 TM_{185}	—	October 14, 2001	Socorro	LINEAR	·	2.1 km	MPC · JPL
179206	2001 TW_{187}	—	October 14, 2001	Socorro	LINEAR	·	2.6 km	MPC · JPL
179207	2001 TX_{196}	—	October 15, 2001	Palomar	NEAT	·	2.0 km	MPC · JPL
179208	2001 TN_{199}	—	October 11, 2001	Socorro	LINEAR	·	4.5 km	MPC · JPL
179209	2001 TX_{199}	—	October 11, 2001	Socorro	LINEAR	GEF	2.1 km	MPC · JPL
179210	2001 TJ_{202}	—	October 11, 2001	Socorro	LINEAR	·	2.4 km	MPC · JPL
179211	2001 TU_{206}	—	October 11, 2001	Palomar	NEAT	·	1.9 km	MPC · JPL
179212	2001 TK_{213}	—	October 13, 2001	Anderson Mesa	LONEOS	JUN	1.5 km	MPC · JPL
179213	2001 TY_{217}	—	October 14, 2001	Palomar	NEAT	·	3.0 km	MPC · JPL
179214	2001 TR_{218}	—	October 14, 2001	Anderson Mesa	LONEOS	·	2.1 km	MPC · JPL
179215	2001 TO_{221}	—	October 14, 2001	Socorro	LINEAR	·	3.3 km	MPC · JPL
179216	2001 TE_{224}	—	October 14, 2001	Socorro	LINEAR	·	3.2 km	MPC · JPL
179217	2001 TB_{225}	—	October 14, 2001	Kitt Peak	Spacewatch	L5	8.7 km	MPC · JPL
179218	2001 TQ_{225}	—	October 14, 2001	Socorro	LINEAR	·	3.6 km	MPC · JPL
179219	2001 TB_{238}	—	October 14, 2001	Eskridge	Farpoint	PHO	1.8 km	MPC · JPL
179220	2001 TT_{241}	—	October 13, 2001	Kitt Peak	Spacewatch	KOR	2.0 km	MPC · JPL
179221 Hrvojebožić	2001 TP_{244}	Hrvojebožić	October 14, 2001	Apache Point	SDSS	AGN	1.4 km	MPC · JPL
179222	2001 TT_{256}	—	October 13, 2001	Kitt Peak	Spacewatch	KOR	1.6 km	MPC · JPL
179223 Tonytyson	2001 TA_{257}	Tonytyson	October 15, 2001	Apache Point	SDSS	PAD	4.1 km	MPC · JPL
179224	2001 UG_{1}	—	October 18, 2001	Socorro	LINEAR	H	990 m	MPC · JPL
179225	2001 UB_{9}	—	October 17, 2001	Socorro	LINEAR	·	2.9 km	MPC · JPL
179226	2001 UX_{10}	—	October 22, 2001	Desert Eagle	W. K. Y. Yeung	·	3.9 km	MPC · JPL
179227	2001 UG_{14}	—	October 21, 2001	Socorro	LINEAR	H	740 m	MPC · JPL
179228	2001 UX_{14}	—	October 24, 2001	Desert Eagle	W. K. Y. Yeung	·	3.0 km	MPC · JPL
179229	2001 UF_{19}	—	October 16, 2001	Palomar	NEAT	·	2.6 km	MPC · JPL
179230	2001 UJ_{27}	—	October 18, 2001	Palomar	NEAT	·	3.2 km	MPC · JPL
179231	2001 UA_{30}	—	October 16, 2001	Socorro	LINEAR	·	2.3 km	MPC · JPL
179232	2001 UY_{39}	—	October 17, 2001	Socorro	LINEAR	·	2.6 km	MPC · JPL
179233	2001 UQ_{60}	—	October 17, 2001	Socorro	LINEAR	L5	10 km	MPC · JPL
179234	2001 UT_{62}	—	October 17, 2001	Socorro	LINEAR	KOR	2.0 km	MPC · JPL
179235	2001 UR_{63}	—	October 18, 2001	Socorro	LINEAR	·	2.7 km	MPC · JPL
179236	2001 UC_{71}	—	October 17, 2001	Kitt Peak	Spacewatch	·	3.2 km	MPC · JPL
179237	2001 UD_{78}	—	October 20, 2001	Socorro	LINEAR	·	3.1 km	MPC · JPL
179238	2001 UV_{82}	—	October 20, 2001	Socorro	LINEAR	·	2.6 km	MPC · JPL
179239	2001 UQ_{84}	—	October 21, 2001	Socorro	LINEAR	·	1.9 km	MPC · JPL
179240	2001 UC_{87}	—	October 18, 2001	Kitt Peak	Spacewatch	·	1.9 km	MPC · JPL
179241	2001 UQ_{89}	—	October 23, 2001	Socorro	LINEAR	HOF	2.8 km	MPC · JPL
179242	2001 UF_{96}	—	October 17, 2001	Socorro	LINEAR	AGN	2.0 km	MPC · JPL
179243	2001 UH_{97}	—	October 17, 2001	Socorro	LINEAR	·	5.4 km	MPC · JPL
179244	2001 UP_{100}	—	October 18, 2001	Socorro	LINEAR	L5	10 km	MPC · JPL
179245	2001 UM_{101}	—	October 20, 2001	Socorro	LINEAR	·	2.8 km	MPC · JPL
179246	2001 US_{101}	—	October 20, 2001	Socorro	LINEAR	·	2.5 km	MPC · JPL
179247	2001 UY_{102}	—	October 20, 2001	Socorro	LINEAR	DOR	4.0 km	MPC · JPL
179248	2001 UO_{104}	—	October 20, 2001	Socorro	LINEAR	KOR	1.8 km	MPC · JPL
179249	2001 UK_{106}	—	October 20, 2001	Socorro	LINEAR	PAD	3.2 km	MPC · JPL
179250	2001 UV_{106}	—	October 20, 2001	Socorro	LINEAR	·	2.1 km	MPC · JPL
179251	2001 UP_{111}	—	October 21, 2001	Socorro	LINEAR	·	2.4 km	MPC · JPL
179252	2001 UR_{128}	—	October 20, 2001	Socorro	LINEAR	·	3.0 km	MPC · JPL
179253	2001 UF_{130}	—	October 20, 2001	Socorro	LINEAR	·	2.2 km	MPC · JPL
179254	2001 UJ_{131}	—	October 20, 2001	Socorro	LINEAR	KOR	1.9 km	MPC · JPL
179255	2001 UY_{134}	—	October 21, 2001	Socorro	LINEAR	·	5.3 km	MPC · JPL
179256	2001 US_{136}	—	October 23, 2001	Socorro	LINEAR	H	990 m	MPC · JPL
179257	2001 UO_{140}	—	October 23, 2001	Socorro	LINEAR	AGN	1.5 km	MPC · JPL
179258	2001 UF_{142}	—	October 23, 2001	Socorro	LINEAR	AGN	1.7 km	MPC · JPL
179259	2001 UR_{143}	—	October 23, 2001	Socorro	LINEAR	HOF	4.5 km	MPC · JPL
179260	2001 UO_{148}	—	October 23, 2001	Socorro	LINEAR	·	2.1 km	MPC · JPL
179261	2001 UZ_{151}	—	October 23, 2001	Socorro	LINEAR	·	3.1 km	MPC · JPL
179262	2001 UC_{157}	—	October 23, 2001	Socorro	LINEAR	·	5.0 km	MPC · JPL
179263	2001 UH_{157}	—	October 23, 2001	Socorro	LINEAR	·	1.9 km	MPC · JPL
179264	2001 UT_{164}	—	October 23, 2001	Palomar	NEAT	·	2.1 km	MPC · JPL
179265	2001 UJ_{166}	—	October 20, 2001	Kitt Peak	Spacewatch	(5)	1.8 km	MPC · JPL
179266	2001 UY_{176}	—	October 21, 2001	Socorro	LINEAR	·	2.7 km	MPC · JPL
179267	2001 UZ_{177}	—	October 23, 2001	Socorro	LINEAR	·	3.3 km	MPC · JPL
179268	2001 UC_{187}	—	October 17, 2001	Palomar	NEAT	·	2.5 km	MPC · JPL
179269	2001 UE_{190}	—	October 18, 2001	Palomar	NEAT	NEM	3.3 km	MPC · JPL
179270	2001 UW_{195}	—	October 18, 2001	Palomar	NEAT	THM	2.9 km	MPC · JPL
179271	2001 UX_{200}	—	October 19, 2001	Palomar	NEAT	AGN	1.5 km	MPC · JPL
179272	2001 UA_{202}	—	October 19, 2001	Palomar	NEAT	·	1.7 km	MPC · JPL
179273	2001 UX_{203}	—	October 19, 2001	Palomar	NEAT	AGN	1.9 km	MPC · JPL
179274	2001 UH_{213}	—	October 23, 2001	Socorro	LINEAR	(12739)	2.3 km	MPC · JPL
179275	2001 UH_{214}	—	October 23, 2001	Socorro	LINEAR	(5)	2.9 km	MPC · JPL
179276	2001 UC_{218}	—	October 25, 2001	Socorro	LINEAR	H	990 m	MPC · JPL
179277	2001 UT_{220}	—	October 21, 2001	Socorro	LINEAR	·	2.6 km	MPC · JPL
179278	2001 UQ_{221}	—	October 24, 2001	Socorro	LINEAR	·	2.6 km	MPC · JPL
179279	2001 UX_{222}	—	October 26, 2001	Kitt Peak	Spacewatch	·	4.4 km	MPC · JPL
179280	2001 UF_{226}	—	October 16, 2001	Palomar	NEAT	AEO	1.8 km	MPC · JPL
179281	2001 VT_{4}	—	November 10, 2001	Socorro	LINEAR	H	990 m	MPC · JPL
179282	2001 VY_{5}	—	November 9, 2001	Socorro	LINEAR	·	2.5 km	MPC · JPL
179283	2001 VR_{6}	—	November 9, 2001	Socorro	LINEAR	·	3.6 km	MPC · JPL
179284	2001 VU_{7}	—	November 9, 2001	Socorro	LINEAR	(5)	1.8 km	MPC · JPL
179285	2001 VP_{11}	—	November 10, 2001	Socorro	LINEAR	·	4.4 km	MPC · JPL
179286	2001 VG_{14}	—	November 10, 2001	Socorro	LINEAR	·	3.2 km	MPC · JPL
179287	2001 VM_{25}	—	November 9, 2001	Socorro	LINEAR	·	2.8 km	MPC · JPL
179288	2001 VL_{26}	—	November 9, 2001	Socorro	LINEAR	·	2.8 km	MPC · JPL
179289	2001 VO_{27}	—	November 9, 2001	Socorro	LINEAR	·	3.0 km	MPC · JPL
179290	2001 VD_{31}	—	November 9, 2001	Socorro	LINEAR	·	3.8 km	MPC · JPL
179291	2001 VU_{42}	—	November 9, 2001	Socorro	LINEAR	·	4.7 km	MPC · JPL
179292	2001 VR_{53}	—	November 10, 2001	Socorro	LINEAR	·	3.1 km	MPC · JPL
179293	2001 VY_{54}	—	November 10, 2001	Socorro	LINEAR	EOS	2.4 km	MPC · JPL
179294	2001 VK_{55}	—	November 10, 2001	Socorro	LINEAR	·	3.3 km	MPC · JPL
179295	2001 VU_{56}	—	November 10, 2001	Socorro	LINEAR	·	4.3 km	MPC · JPL
179296	2001 VS_{60}	—	November 10, 2001	Socorro	LINEAR	PAD	3.4 km	MPC · JPL
179297	2001 VB_{62}	—	November 10, 2001	Socorro	LINEAR	·	3.9 km	MPC · JPL
179298	2001 VG_{70}	—	November 11, 2001	Socorro	LINEAR	·	5.5 km	MPC · JPL
179299	2001 VK_{77}	—	November 9, 2001	Palomar	NEAT	T_{j} (2.99) · EUP	7.3 km	MPC · JPL
179300	2001 VL_{80}	—	November 10, 2001	Palomar	NEAT	·	2.5 km	MPC · JPL

== 179301–179400 ==
back to top

Designation			Discovery			Properties		Ref
Permanent	Provisional	Named after	Date	Site	Discoverer(s)	Category	Diam.	Ref
179301	2001 VF_{85}	—	November 12, 2001	Socorro	LINEAR	PAD	3.6 km	MPC · JPL
179302	2001 VO_{85}	—	November 12, 2001	Socorro	LINEAR	·	2.9 km	MPC · JPL
179303	2001 VF_{89}	—	November 12, 2001	Socorro	LINEAR	·	3.6 km	MPC · JPL
179304	2001 VW_{95}	—	November 15, 2001	Socorro	LINEAR	EOS	2.5 km	MPC · JPL
179305	2001 VS_{98}	—	November 15, 2001	Socorro	LINEAR	·	4.1 km	MPC · JPL
179306	2001 VA_{100}	—	November 15, 2001	Socorro	LINEAR	·	3.7 km	MPC · JPL
179307	2001 VV_{100}	—	November 12, 2001	Socorro	LINEAR	·	2.5 km	MPC · JPL
179308	2001 VE_{101}	—	November 12, 2001	Socorro	LINEAR	·	3.0 km	MPC · JPL
179309	2001 VF_{109}	—	November 12, 2001	Socorro	LINEAR	·	2.6 km	MPC · JPL
179310	2001 VN_{112}	—	November 12, 2001	Socorro	LINEAR	HOF	4.5 km	MPC · JPL
179311	2001 VL_{126}	—	November 14, 2001	Kitt Peak	Spacewatch	·	2.4 km	MPC · JPL
179312	2001 VM_{126}	—	November 14, 2001	Kitt Peak	Spacewatch	·	2.3 km	MPC · JPL
179313	2001 WY_{16}	—	November 17, 2001	Socorro	LINEAR	·	3.6 km	MPC · JPL
179314	2001 WR_{18}	—	November 17, 2001	Socorro	LINEAR	PAD	2.4 km	MPC · JPL
179315	2001 WX_{18}	—	November 17, 2001	Socorro	LINEAR	(12739)	2.6 km	MPC · JPL
179316	2001 WD_{19}	—	November 17, 2001	Socorro	LINEAR	·	2.9 km	MPC · JPL
179317	2001 WJ_{21}	—	November 18, 2001	Socorro	LINEAR	·	2.9 km	MPC · JPL
179318	2001 WV_{23}	—	November 17, 2001	Kitt Peak	Spacewatch	·	3.4 km	MPC · JPL
179319	2001 WW_{23}	—	November 17, 2001	Kitt Peak	Spacewatch	·	2.6 km	MPC · JPL
179320	2001 WH_{30}	—	November 17, 2001	Socorro	LINEAR	KOR	1.8 km	MPC · JPL
179321	2001 WE_{34}	—	November 17, 2001	Socorro	LINEAR	·	3.2 km	MPC · JPL
179322	2001 WF_{44}	—	November 18, 2001	Socorro	LINEAR	KOR	1.9 km	MPC · JPL
179323	2001 WJ_{45}	—	November 19, 2001	Socorro	LINEAR	·	2.4 km	MPC · JPL
179324	2001 WS_{46}	—	November 19, 2001	Socorro	LINEAR	·	2.8 km	MPC · JPL
179325	2001 WU_{47}	—	November 19, 2001	Anderson Mesa	LONEOS	·	3.6 km	MPC · JPL
179326	2001 WX_{53}	—	November 19, 2001	Socorro	LINEAR	·	2.6 km	MPC · JPL
179327	2001 WY_{55}	—	November 19, 2001	Socorro	LINEAR	·	1.8 km	MPC · JPL
179328	2001 WU_{58}	—	November 19, 2001	Socorro	LINEAR	KOR	1.7 km	MPC · JPL
179329	2001 WZ_{59}	—	November 19, 2001	Socorro	LINEAR	·	3.4 km	MPC · JPL
179330	2001 WL_{67}	—	November 20, 2001	Socorro	LINEAR	·	2.8 km	MPC · JPL
179331	2001 WZ_{68}	—	November 20, 2001	Socorro	LINEAR	·	2.3 km	MPC · JPL
179332	2001 WZ_{96}	—	November 18, 2001	Kitt Peak	Spacewatch	·	2.3 km	MPC · JPL
179333	2001 XX_{8}	—	December 9, 2001	Socorro	LINEAR	·	3.2 km	MPC · JPL
179334	2001 XC_{13}	—	December 9, 2001	Socorro	LINEAR	·	4.5 km	MPC · JPL
179335	2001 XA_{19}	—	December 9, 2001	Socorro	LINEAR	·	5.8 km	MPC · JPL
179336	2001 XT_{21}	—	December 9, 2001	Socorro	LINEAR	EUN	2.6 km	MPC · JPL
179337	2001 XH_{36}	—	December 9, 2001	Socorro	LINEAR	·	3.7 km	MPC · JPL
179338	2001 XX_{45}	—	December 9, 2001	Socorro	LINEAR	·	5.2 km	MPC · JPL
179339	2001 XC_{61}	—	December 10, 2001	Socorro	LINEAR	·	4.2 km	MPC · JPL
179340	2001 XH_{64}	—	December 11, 2001	Socorro	LINEAR	EOS	2.9 km	MPC · JPL
179341	2001 XF_{77}	—	December 11, 2001	Socorro	LINEAR	EOS	2.7 km	MPC · JPL
179342	2001 XO_{89}	—	December 10, 2001	Socorro	LINEAR	·	2.9 km	MPC · JPL
179343	2001 XW_{90}	—	December 10, 2001	Socorro	LINEAR	HOF	3.6 km	MPC · JPL
179344	2001 XR_{96}	—	December 10, 2001	Socorro	LINEAR	KOR	2.6 km	MPC · JPL
179345	2001 XP_{107}	—	December 10, 2001	Socorro	LINEAR	·	3.7 km	MPC · JPL
179346	2001 XQ_{107}	—	December 10, 2001	Socorro	LINEAR	TEL	4.7 km	MPC · JPL
179347	2001 XV_{116}	—	December 13, 2001	Socorro	LINEAR	·	6.2 km	MPC · JPL
179348	2001 XV_{120}	—	December 14, 2001	Socorro	LINEAR	·	2.7 km	MPC · JPL
179349	2001 XW_{122}	—	December 14, 2001	Socorro	LINEAR	·	3.0 km	MPC · JPL
179350	2001 XG_{123}	—	December 14, 2001	Socorro	LINEAR	·	2.1 km	MPC · JPL
179351	2001 XE_{128}	—	December 14, 2001	Socorro	LINEAR	·	2.6 km	MPC · JPL
179352	2001 XA_{130}	—	December 14, 2001	Socorro	LINEAR	·	2.8 km	MPC · JPL
179353	2001 XG_{134}	—	December 14, 2001	Socorro	LINEAR	·	2.5 km	MPC · JPL
179354	2001 XJ_{135}	—	December 14, 2001	Socorro	LINEAR	HOF	4.9 km	MPC · JPL
179355	2001 XF_{138}	—	December 14, 2001	Socorro	LINEAR	EOS	2.6 km	MPC · JPL
179356	2001 XH_{147}	—	December 14, 2001	Socorro	LINEAR	KOR	2.0 km	MPC · JPL
179357	2001 XP_{154}	—	December 14, 2001	Socorro	LINEAR	·	2.5 km	MPC · JPL
179358	2001 XC_{160}	—	December 14, 2001	Socorro	LINEAR	·	3.6 km	MPC · JPL
179359	2001 XA_{179}	—	December 14, 2001	Socorro	LINEAR	·	4.8 km	MPC · JPL
179360	2001 XH_{187}	—	December 14, 2001	Socorro	LINEAR	THM	2.7 km	MPC · JPL
179361	2001 XL_{192}	—	December 14, 2001	Socorro	LINEAR	·	3.1 km	MPC · JPL
179362	2001 XH_{196}	—	December 14, 2001	Socorro	LINEAR	·	5.2 km	MPC · JPL
179363	2001 XV_{201}	—	December 14, 2001	Kitt Peak	Spacewatch	THM	2.7 km	MPC · JPL
179364	2001 XZ_{205}	—	December 11, 2001	Socorro	LINEAR	·	3.1 km	MPC · JPL
179365	2001 XZ_{206}	—	December 11, 2001	Socorro	LINEAR	·	3.9 km	MPC · JPL
179366	2001 XC_{214}	—	December 11, 2001	Socorro	LINEAR	·	3.9 km	MPC · JPL
179367	2001 XP_{217}	—	December 14, 2001	Socorro	LINEAR	EOS	2.9 km	MPC · JPL
179368	2001 XB_{220}	—	December 15, 2001	Socorro	LINEAR	EOS	2.5 km	MPC · JPL
179369	2001 XV_{225}	—	December 15, 2001	Socorro	LINEAR	·	3.7 km	MPC · JPL
179370	2001 XV_{226}	—	December 15, 2001	Socorro	LINEAR	·	3.0 km	MPC · JPL
179371	2001 XD_{230}	—	December 15, 2001	Socorro	LINEAR	·	3.6 km	MPC · JPL
179372	2001 XF_{232}	—	December 15, 2001	Socorro	LINEAR	·	2.1 km	MPC · JPL
179373	2001 XB_{234}	—	December 15, 2001	Socorro	LINEAR	EOS	2.7 km	MPC · JPL
179374	2001 XV_{234}	—	December 15, 2001	Socorro	LINEAR	·	2.6 km	MPC · JPL
179375	2001 XH_{235}	—	December 15, 2001	Socorro	LINEAR	·	2.3 km	MPC · JPL
179376	2001 XC_{236}	—	December 15, 2001	Socorro	LINEAR	EOS	3.4 km	MPC · JPL
179377	2001 XC_{240}	—	December 15, 2001	Socorro	LINEAR	·	4.4 km	MPC · JPL
179378	2001 XF_{245}	—	December 15, 2001	Socorro	LINEAR	·	2.5 km	MPC · JPL
179379	2001 XL_{249}	—	December 13, 2001	Xinglong	SCAP	·	6.3 km	MPC · JPL
179380	2001 XD_{257}	—	December 7, 2001	Socorro	LINEAR	·	3.5 km	MPC · JPL
179381	2001 XB_{258}	—	December 7, 2001	Haleakala	NEAT	·	5.2 km	MPC · JPL
179382	2001 YA_{5}	—	December 23, 2001	Kingsnake	J. V. McClusky	·	4.6 km	MPC · JPL
179383	2001 YU_{14}	—	December 17, 2001	Socorro	LINEAR	·	4.5 km	MPC · JPL
179384	2001 YY_{16}	—	December 17, 2001	Socorro	LINEAR	THM	2.8 km	MPC · JPL
179385	2001 YO_{18}	—	December 17, 2001	Socorro	LINEAR	THM	2.8 km	MPC · JPL
179386	2001 YY_{37}	—	December 18, 2001	Socorro	LINEAR	·	5.0 km	MPC · JPL
179387	2001 YO_{38}	—	December 18, 2001	Socorro	LINEAR	AGN	1.7 km	MPC · JPL
179388	2001 YK_{49}	—	December 18, 2001	Socorro	LINEAR	·	3.1 km	MPC · JPL
179389	2001 YP_{69}	—	December 18, 2001	Socorro	LINEAR	·	3.6 km	MPC · JPL
179390	2001 YA_{73}	—	December 18, 2001	Socorro	LINEAR	·	5.9 km	MPC · JPL
179391	2001 YC_{98}	—	December 17, 2001	Socorro	LINEAR	·	3.3 km	MPC · JPL
179392	2001 YQ_{108}	—	December 18, 2001	Socorro	LINEAR	·	3.4 km	MPC · JPL
179393	2001 YU_{108}	—	December 18, 2001	Socorro	LINEAR	EOS	2.8 km	MPC · JPL
179394	2001 YM_{114}	—	December 19, 2001	Palomar	NEAT	·	4.5 km	MPC · JPL
179395	2001 YX_{114}	—	December 17, 2001	Socorro	LINEAR	EOS	6.6 km	MPC · JPL
179396	2001 YF_{116}	—	December 17, 2001	Socorro	LINEAR	·	3.8 km	MPC · JPL
179397	2001 YW_{116}	—	December 18, 2001	Socorro	LINEAR	·	6.4 km	MPC · JPL
179398	2001 YH_{121}	—	December 17, 2001	Socorro	LINEAR	EOS	2.9 km	MPC · JPL
179399	2001 YS_{121}	—	December 17, 2001	Socorro	LINEAR	·	3.4 km	MPC · JPL
179400	2001 YN_{131}	—	December 18, 2001	Socorro	LINEAR	·	3.5 km	MPC · JPL

== 179401–179500 ==
back to top

Designation			Discovery			Properties		Ref
Permanent	Provisional	Named after	Date	Site	Discoverer(s)	Category	Diam.	Ref
179401	2001 YZ_{133}	—	December 22, 2001	Kitt Peak	Spacewatch	·	5.0 km	MPC · JPL
179402	2001 YR_{135}	—	December 20, 2001	Socorro	LINEAR	·	3.2 km	MPC · JPL
179403	2001 YE_{137}	—	December 22, 2001	Socorro	LINEAR	·	4.6 km	MPC · JPL
179404	2001 YF_{142}	—	December 17, 2001	Kitt Peak	Spacewatch	·	1.9 km	MPC · JPL
179405	2001 YV_{143}	—	December 17, 2001	Socorro	LINEAR	·	3.6 km	MPC · JPL
179406	2001 YB_{149}	—	December 19, 2001	Palomar	NEAT	EOS	6.1 km	MPC · JPL
179407	2001 YC_{151}	—	December 19, 2001	Socorro	LINEAR	·	3.7 km	MPC · JPL
179408	2001 YF_{153}	—	December 19, 2001	Anderson Mesa	LONEOS	·	6.5 km	MPC · JPL
179409	2001 YB_{155}	—	December 20, 2001	Palomar	NEAT	TIR	4.4 km	MPC · JPL
179410	2001 YO_{156}	—	December 20, 2001	Palomar	NEAT	·	7.2 km	MPC · JPL
179411 Draganroša	2001 YM_{158}	Draganroša	December 18, 2001	Apache Point	SDSS	HYG	4.7 km	MPC · JPL
179412	2001 YB_{161}	—	December 18, 2001	Palomar	NEAT	·	2.4 km	MPC · JPL
179413 Stevekahn	2001 YM_{161}	Stevekahn	December 19, 2001	Apache Point	SDSS	·	5.2 km	MPC · JPL
179414	2002 AD_{3}	—	January 7, 2002	Socorro	LINEAR	H	1.2 km	MPC · JPL
179415	2002 AC_{12}	—	January 10, 2002	Campo Imperatore	CINEOS	THM	2.7 km	MPC · JPL
179416	2002 AP_{14}	—	January 9, 2002	Črni Vrh	Skvarč, J.	·	3.6 km	MPC · JPL
179417	2002 AN_{17}	—	January 9, 2002	Socorro	LINEAR	·	1.5 km	MPC · JPL
179418	2002 AV_{19}	—	January 8, 2002	Socorro	LINEAR	·	5.5 km	MPC · JPL
179419	2002 AC_{30}	—	January 9, 2002	Socorro	LINEAR	·	4.3 km	MPC · JPL
179420	2002 AS_{37}	—	January 9, 2002	Socorro	LINEAR	·	4.0 km	MPC · JPL
179421	2002 AG_{39}	—	January 9, 2002	Socorro	LINEAR	HYG	4.1 km	MPC · JPL
179422	2002 AT_{43}	—	January 9, 2002	Socorro	LINEAR	·	4.5 km	MPC · JPL
179423	2002 AM_{46}	—	January 9, 2002	Socorro	LINEAR	·	3.5 km	MPC · JPL
179424	2002 AM_{48}	—	January 9, 2002	Socorro	LINEAR	·	6.2 km	MPC · JPL
179425	2002 AO_{48}	—	January 9, 2002	Socorro	LINEAR	THM	2.7 km	MPC · JPL
179426	2002 AG_{52}	—	January 9, 2002	Socorro	LINEAR	·	3.3 km	MPC · JPL
179427	2002 AC_{54}	—	January 9, 2002	Socorro	LINEAR	·	3.8 km	MPC · JPL
179428	2002 AF_{58}	—	January 9, 2002	Socorro	LINEAR	EOS	3.7 km	MPC · JPL
179429	2002 AD_{61}	—	January 11, 2002	Socorro	LINEAR	·	6.2 km	MPC · JPL
179430	2002 AY_{65}	—	January 12, 2002	Socorro	LINEAR	·	3.2 km	MPC · JPL
179431	2002 AB_{74}	—	January 8, 2002	Socorro	LINEAR	THM	2.5 km	MPC · JPL
179432	2002 AO_{75}	—	January 8, 2002	Socorro	LINEAR	EOS	2.7 km	MPC · JPL
179433	2002 AZ_{76}	—	January 8, 2002	Socorro	LINEAR	(31811)	4.0 km	MPC · JPL
179434	2002 AZ_{79}	—	January 8, 2002	Socorro	LINEAR	·	2.1 km	MPC · JPL
179435	2002 AC_{83}	—	January 9, 2002	Socorro	LINEAR	·	5.4 km	MPC · JPL
179436	2002 AO_{83}	—	January 9, 2002	Socorro	LINEAR	·	4.7 km	MPC · JPL
179437	2002 AT_{86}	—	January 9, 2002	Socorro	LINEAR	·	4.5 km	MPC · JPL
179438	2002 AW_{86}	—	January 9, 2002	Socorro	LINEAR	·	3.7 km	MPC · JPL
179439	2002 AU_{95}	—	January 8, 2002	Socorro	LINEAR	·	3.7 km	MPC · JPL
179440	2002 AM_{103}	—	January 9, 2002	Socorro	LINEAR	·	3.5 km	MPC · JPL
179441	2002 AC_{116}	—	January 9, 2002	Socorro	LINEAR	·	4.5 km	MPC · JPL
179442	2002 AJ_{124}	—	January 9, 2002	Socorro	LINEAR	·	6.7 km	MPC · JPL
179443	2002 AU_{124}	—	January 9, 2002	Socorro	LINEAR	·	4.8 km	MPC · JPL
179444	2002 AD_{135}	—	January 9, 2002	Socorro	LINEAR	·	3.2 km	MPC · JPL
179445	2002 AS_{143}	—	January 13, 2002	Socorro	LINEAR	·	3.4 km	MPC · JPL
179446	2002 AV_{158}	—	January 13, 2002	Socorro	LINEAR	·	6.4 km	MPC · JPL
179447	2002 AW_{158}	—	January 13, 2002	Socorro	LINEAR	·	4.0 km	MPC · JPL
179448	2002 AG_{159}	—	January 13, 2002	Socorro	LINEAR	VER	5.6 km	MPC · JPL
179449	2002 AB_{165}	—	January 13, 2002	Socorro	LINEAR	·	6.5 km	MPC · JPL
179450	2002 AU_{170}	—	January 14, 2002	Socorro	LINEAR	EOS	2.9 km	MPC · JPL
179451	2002 AC_{171}	—	January 14, 2002	Socorro	LINEAR	·	3.3 km	MPC · JPL
179452	2002 AE_{171}	—	January 14, 2002	Socorro	LINEAR	·	4.3 km	MPC · JPL
179453	2002 AV_{171}	—	January 14, 2002	Socorro	LINEAR	·	4.2 km	MPC · JPL
179454	2002 AA_{172}	—	January 14, 2002	Socorro	LINEAR	·	3.3 km	MPC · JPL
179455	2002 AB_{172}	—	January 14, 2002	Socorro	LINEAR	THM	3.2 km	MPC · JPL
179456	2002 AF_{172}	—	January 14, 2002	Socorro	LINEAR	EOS	3.7 km	MPC · JPL
179457	2002 AR_{173}	—	January 14, 2002	Socorro	LINEAR	VER	3.8 km	MPC · JPL
179458	2002 AQ_{177}	—	January 14, 2002	Socorro	LINEAR	·	3.6 km	MPC · JPL
179459	2002 AG_{189}	—	January 10, 2002	Palomar	NEAT	·	4.3 km	MPC · JPL
179460	2002 AK_{190}	—	January 11, 2002	Anderson Mesa	LONEOS	·	2.5 km	MPC · JPL
179461	2002 AA_{199}	—	January 8, 2002	Socorro	LINEAR	·	4.8 km	MPC · JPL
179462	2002 AJ_{202}	—	January 12, 2002	Socorro	LINEAR	URS	7.4 km	MPC · JPL
179463	2002 AG_{209}	—	January 9, 2002	Nashville	Clingan, R.	·	4.6 km	MPC · JPL
179464	2002 BM_{1}	—	January 19, 2002	Desert Eagle	W. K. Y. Yeung	·	4.3 km	MPC · JPL
179465	2002 BY_{2}	—	January 18, 2002	Anderson Mesa	LONEOS	·	5.7 km	MPC · JPL
179466	2002 BG_{5}	—	January 19, 2002	Anderson Mesa	LONEOS	·	5.2 km	MPC · JPL
179467	2002 BM_{9}	—	January 18, 2002	Socorro	LINEAR	THM	3.7 km	MPC · JPL
179468	2002 BA_{16}	—	January 19, 2002	Socorro	LINEAR	·	3.9 km	MPC · JPL
179469	2002 BE_{20}	—	January 22, 2002	Socorro	LINEAR	·	4.0 km	MPC · JPL
179470	2002 BV_{23}	—	January 23, 2002	Socorro	LINEAR	·	3.4 km	MPC · JPL
179471	2002 BX_{23}	—	January 23, 2002	Socorro	LINEAR	·	4.6 km	MPC · JPL
179472	2002 BH_{24}	—	January 23, 2002	Socorro	LINEAR	·	5.0 km	MPC · JPL
179473	2002 BU_{26}	—	January 17, 2002	Palomar	NEAT	·	4.3 km	MPC · JPL
179474	2002 BM_{27}	—	January 20, 2002	Anderson Mesa	LONEOS	LIX	6.2 km	MPC · JPL
179475	2002 BY_{29}	—	January 21, 2002	Anderson Mesa	LONEOS	EOS	2.9 km	MPC · JPL
179476	2002 BK_{30}	—	January 21, 2002	Anderson Mesa	LONEOS	TIR	4.8 km	MPC · JPL
179477	2002 BL_{30}	—	January 21, 2002	Anderson Mesa	LONEOS	EUP	7.1 km	MPC · JPL
179478	2002 BM_{30}	—	January 21, 2002	Anderson Mesa	LONEOS	EUP	7.5 km	MPC · JPL
179479	2002 CR_{2}	—	February 3, 2002	Palomar	NEAT	HYG	4.0 km	MPC · JPL
179480	2002 CU_{3}	—	February 3, 2002	Palomar	NEAT	HYG	4.9 km	MPC · JPL
179481	2002 CT_{13}	—	February 8, 2002	Desert Eagle	W. K. Y. Yeung	·	5.2 km	MPC · JPL
179482	2002 CN_{17}	—	February 6, 2002	Socorro	LINEAR	·	5.4 km	MPC · JPL
179483	2002 CO_{17}	—	February 6, 2002	Socorro	LINEAR	·	4.3 km	MPC · JPL
179484	2002 CZ_{17}	—	February 6, 2002	Socorro	LINEAR	·	6.9 km	MPC · JPL
179485	2002 CC_{22}	—	February 5, 2002	Palomar	NEAT	·	6.8 km	MPC · JPL
179486	2002 CN_{23}	—	February 6, 2002	Palomar	NEAT	EOS	2.9 km	MPC · JPL
179487	2002 CD_{28}	—	February 6, 2002	Socorro	LINEAR	TIR	6.0 km	MPC · JPL
179488	2002 CK_{29}	—	February 6, 2002	Socorro	LINEAR	·	4.7 km	MPC · JPL
179489	2002 CZ_{33}	—	February 6, 2002	Socorro	LINEAR	EOS	4.4 km	MPC · JPL
179490	2002 CY_{37}	—	February 7, 2002	Socorro	LINEAR	·	4.9 km	MPC · JPL
179491	2002 CR_{41}	—	February 7, 2002	Palomar	NEAT	·	5.8 km	MPC · JPL
179492	2002 CX_{49}	—	February 3, 2002	Haleakala	NEAT	THB	4.2 km	MPC · JPL
179493	2002 CN_{62}	—	February 6, 2002	Socorro	LINEAR	·	5.3 km	MPC · JPL
179494	2002 CU_{62}	—	February 6, 2002	Socorro	LINEAR	URS	5.9 km	MPC · JPL
179495	2002 CT_{65}	—	February 6, 2002	Socorro	LINEAR	·	5.3 km	MPC · JPL
179496	2002 CT_{69}	—	February 7, 2002	Socorro	LINEAR	·	3.7 km	MPC · JPL
179497	2002 CX_{77}	—	February 7, 2002	Socorro	LINEAR	·	5.3 km	MPC · JPL
179498	2002 CW_{78}	—	February 7, 2002	Socorro	LINEAR	THM	3.0 km	MPC · JPL
179499	2002 CY_{81}	—	February 7, 2002	Socorro	LINEAR	HYG	4.3 km	MPC · JPL
179500	2002 CV_{84}	—	February 7, 2002	Socorro	LINEAR	EOS	3.5 km	MPC · JPL

== 179501–179600 ==
back to top

Designation			Discovery			Properties		Ref
Permanent	Provisional	Named after	Date	Site	Discoverer(s)	Category	Diam.	Ref
179501	2002 CP_{86}	—	February 7, 2002	Socorro	LINEAR	·	3.8 km	MPC · JPL
179502	2002 CX_{98}	—	February 7, 2002	Socorro	LINEAR	EOS	3.8 km	MPC · JPL
179503	2002 CT_{103}	—	February 7, 2002	Socorro	LINEAR	·	7.4 km	MPC · JPL
179504	2002 CL_{118}	—	February 14, 2002	Desert Eagle	W. K. Y. Yeung	HYG	6.5 km	MPC · JPL
179505	2002 CV_{122}	—	February 7, 2002	Socorro	LINEAR	·	6.6 km	MPC · JPL
179506	2002 CC_{131}	—	February 7, 2002	Socorro	LINEAR	·	4.8 km	MPC · JPL
179507	2002 CK_{132}	—	February 7, 2002	Socorro	LINEAR	LIX	6.2 km	MPC · JPL
179508	2002 CR_{135}	—	February 8, 2002	Socorro	LINEAR	·	5.5 km	MPC · JPL
179509	2002 CZ_{136}	—	February 8, 2002	Socorro	LINEAR	·	4.6 km	MPC · JPL
179510	2002 CM_{141}	—	February 8, 2002	Socorro	LINEAR	·	5.0 km	MPC · JPL
179511	2002 CC_{143}	—	February 9, 2002	Socorro	LINEAR	·	3.5 km	MPC · JPL
179512	2002 CR_{143}	—	February 9, 2002	Socorro	LINEAR	·	3.3 km	MPC · JPL
179513	2002 CV_{155}	—	February 6, 2002	Socorro	LINEAR	·	4.1 km	MPC · JPL
179514	2002 CW_{155}	—	February 6, 2002	Socorro	LINEAR	·	7.0 km	MPC · JPL
179515	2002 CO_{156}	—	February 7, 2002	Socorro	LINEAR	·	3.1 km	MPC · JPL
179516	2002 CT_{156}	—	February 7, 2002	Socorro	LINEAR	·	5.0 km	MPC · JPL
179517	2002 CJ_{157}	—	February 7, 2002	Socorro	LINEAR	VER	5.0 km	MPC · JPL
179518	2002 CZ_{159}	—	February 8, 2002	Socorro	LINEAR	·	4.7 km	MPC · JPL
179519	2002 CP_{160}	—	February 8, 2002	Socorro	LINEAR	·	4.4 km	MPC · JPL
179520	2002 CP_{162}	—	February 8, 2002	Socorro	LINEAR	LIX	6.1 km	MPC · JPL
179521	2002 CG_{164}	—	February 8, 2002	Socorro	LINEAR	EOS	3.3 km	MPC · JPL
179522	2002 CQ_{165}	—	February 8, 2002	Socorro	LINEAR	·	4.9 km	MPC · JPL
179523	2002 CX_{166}	—	February 8, 2002	Socorro	LINEAR	·	6.9 km	MPC · JPL
179524	2002 CX_{170}	—	February 8, 2002	Socorro	LINEAR	LUT	8.3 km	MPC · JPL
179525	2002 CJ_{183}	—	February 10, 2002	Socorro	LINEAR	EUP	7.1 km	MPC · JPL
179526	2002 CJ_{186}	—	February 10, 2002	Socorro	LINEAR	·	4.3 km	MPC · JPL
179527	2002 CK_{186}	—	February 10, 2002	Socorro	LINEAR	THM	2.4 km	MPC · JPL
179528	2002 CE_{191}	—	February 10, 2002	Socorro	LINEAR	THM	2.8 km	MPC · JPL
179529	2002 CT_{195}	—	February 10, 2002	Socorro	LINEAR	TIR	4.8 km	MPC · JPL
179530	2002 CA_{196}	—	February 10, 2002	Socorro	LINEAR	·	6.2 km	MPC · JPL
179531	2002 CD_{198}	—	February 10, 2002	Socorro	LINEAR	·	3.5 km	MPC · JPL
179532	2002 CL_{201}	—	February 10, 2002	Socorro	LINEAR	·	3.9 km	MPC · JPL
179533	2002 CP_{201}	—	February 10, 2002	Socorro	LINEAR	·	5.9 km	MPC · JPL
179534	2002 CT_{207}	—	February 10, 2002	Socorro	LINEAR	·	5.5 km	MPC · JPL
179535	2002 CH_{213}	—	February 10, 2002	Socorro	LINEAR	THM	3.5 km	MPC · JPL
179536	2002 CG_{225}	—	February 14, 2002	Bergisch Gladbach	W. Bickel	EUP	6.4 km	MPC · JPL
179537	2002 CY_{234}	—	February 9, 2002	Kitt Peak	Spacewatch	THM	3.3 km	MPC · JPL
179538	2002 CG_{241}	—	February 11, 2002	Socorro	LINEAR	CYB	6.2 km	MPC · JPL
179539	2002 CP_{241}	—	February 11, 2002	Socorro	LINEAR	·	4.4 km	MPC · JPL
179540	2002 CY_{253}	—	February 4, 2002	Cima Ekar	ADAS	·	4.5 km	MPC · JPL
179541	2002 CZ_{259}	—	February 7, 2002	Palomar	NEAT	·	4.3 km	MPC · JPL
179542	2002 CC_{263}	—	February 6, 2002	Socorro	LINEAR	·	6.1 km	MPC · JPL
179543	2002 CM_{263}	—	February 6, 2002	Palomar	NEAT	·	5.3 km	MPC · JPL
179544	2002 CA_{292}	—	February 11, 2002	Socorro	LINEAR	fast	3.5 km	MPC · JPL
179545	2002 CQ_{294}	—	February 10, 2002	Socorro	LINEAR	·	4.1 km	MPC · JPL
179546	2002 CG_{295}	—	February 10, 2002	Socorro	LINEAR	·	3.6 km	MPC · JPL
179547	2002 CN_{295}	—	February 10, 2002	Socorro	LINEAR	·	4.5 km	MPC · JPL
179548	2002 CP_{295}	—	February 10, 2002	Socorro	LINEAR	·	7.3 km	MPC · JPL
179549	2002 CH_{296}	—	February 10, 2002	Socorro	LINEAR	·	4.0 km	MPC · JPL
179550	2002 CP_{302}	—	February 12, 2002	Socorro	LINEAR	EOS	3.0 km	MPC · JPL
179551	2002 CQ_{311}	—	February 11, 2002	Socorro	LINEAR	·	4.6 km	MPC · JPL
179552	2002 CA_{315}	—	February 8, 2002	Haleakala	NEAT	·	3.8 km	MPC · JPL
179553	2002 DJ	—	February 16, 2002	Bohyunsan	Jeon, Y.-B., Lee, B.-C.	THM	4.5 km	MPC · JPL
179554	2002 DB_{2}	—	February 19, 2002	Socorro	LINEAR	·	7.6 km	MPC · JPL
179555	2002 DW_{5}	—	February 16, 2002	Palomar	NEAT	·	3.4 km	MPC · JPL
179556	2002 DH_{6}	—	February 20, 2002	Kitt Peak	Spacewatch	·	4.5 km	MPC · JPL
179557	2002 DL_{7}	—	February 19, 2002	Socorro	LINEAR	·	5.3 km	MPC · JPL
179558	2002 DD_{9}	—	February 19, 2002	Socorro	LINEAR	TIR	4.6 km	MPC · JPL
179559	2002 DF_{13}	—	February 28, 2002	Palomar	NEAT	·	5.3 km	MPC · JPL
179560	2002 EL_{11}	—	March 13, 2002	Kleť	Kleť	·	3.6 km	MPC · JPL
179561	2002 EO_{17}	—	March 5, 2002	Kitt Peak	Spacewatch	THM	4.1 km	MPC · JPL
179562	2002 EY_{28}	—	March 9, 2002	Socorro	LINEAR	·	4.8 km	MPC · JPL
179563	2002 ED_{50}	—	March 12, 2002	Palomar	NEAT	·	2.1 km	MPC · JPL
179564	2002 ES_{55}	—	March 13, 2002	Socorro	LINEAR	·	5.6 km	MPC · JPL
179565	2002 ES_{62}	—	March 13, 2002	Socorro	LINEAR	·	2.2 km	MPC · JPL
179566	2002 EN_{63}	—	March 13, 2002	Socorro	LINEAR	·	6.0 km	MPC · JPL
179567	2002 EU_{80}	—	March 13, 2002	Palomar	NEAT	·	4.6 km	MPC · JPL
179568	2002 EZ_{83}	—	March 9, 2002	Socorro	LINEAR	·	4.3 km	MPC · JPL
179569	2002 ER_{92}	—	March 14, 2002	Socorro	LINEAR	·	3.6 km	MPC · JPL
179570	2002 EN_{95}	—	March 14, 2002	Socorro	LINEAR	EOS	4.0 km	MPC · JPL
179571	2002 ED_{152}	—	March 14, 2002	Socorro	LINEAR	·	5.5 km	MPC · JPL
179572	2002 FY_{11}	—	March 16, 2002	Anderson Mesa	LONEOS	·	6.6 km	MPC · JPL
179573	2002 FW_{20}	—	March 19, 2002	Palomar	NEAT	·	7.0 km	MPC · JPL
179574	2002 FA_{25}	—	March 19, 2002	Palomar	NEAT	·	6.9 km	MPC · JPL
179575	2002 FZ_{30}	—	March 20, 2002	Palomar	NEAT	·	5.1 km	MPC · JPL
179576	2002 GZ_{10}	—	April 10, 2002	Socorro	LINEAR	·	990 m	MPC · JPL
179577	2002 GO_{12}	—	April 14, 2002	Socorro	LINEAR	HYG	5.6 km	MPC · JPL
179578	2002 GQ_{15}	—	April 15, 2002	Socorro	LINEAR	·	8.0 km	MPC · JPL
179579	2002 GE_{55}	—	April 5, 2002	Palomar	NEAT	·	2.0 km	MPC · JPL
179580	2002 GQ_{125}	—	April 12, 2002	Socorro	LINEAR	·	4.3 km	MPC · JPL
179581	2002 HZ	—	April 16, 2002	Socorro	LINEAR	·	7.2 km	MPC · JPL
179582	2002 JJ_{2}	—	May 4, 2002	Socorro	LINEAR	EUP ·	7.5 km	MPC · JPL
179583	2002 JG_{21}	—	May 8, 2002	Haleakala	NEAT	·	1.1 km	MPC · JPL
179584	2002 JW_{85}	—	May 11, 2002	Socorro	LINEAR	·	1.3 km	MPC · JPL
179585	2002 JB_{147}	—	May 11, 2002	Socorro	LINEAR	·	2.0 km	MPC · JPL
179586	2002 KD_{15}	—	May 18, 2002	Palomar	NEAT	·	960 m	MPC · JPL
179587	2002 LS_{2}	—	June 5, 2002	Anderson Mesa	LONEOS	·	1.2 km	MPC · JPL
179588	2002 LD_{8}	—	June 5, 2002	Socorro	LINEAR	·	1.2 km	MPC · JPL
179589	2002 LM_{30}	—	June 2, 2002	Palomar	NEAT	·	970 m	MPC · JPL
179590	2002 LJ_{31}	—	June 3, 2002	Palomar	NEAT	·	1.1 km	MPC · JPL
179591	2002 LH_{36}	—	June 9, 2002	Socorro	LINEAR	·	1.2 km	MPC · JPL
179592	2002 LM_{40}	—	June 10, 2002	Socorro	LINEAR	·	1.1 km	MPC · JPL
179593 Penglangxiaoxue	2002 LK_{61}	Penglangxiaoxue	June 1, 2002	Palomar	NEAT	·	1.2 km	MPC · JPL
179594	2002 MP_{2}	—	June 17, 2002	Palomar	NEAT	·	1.5 km	MPC · JPL
179595 Belkovich	2002 MK_{4}	Belkovich	June 22, 2002	La Palma	A. Fitzsimmons, Williams, I. P.	·	840 m	MPC · JPL
179596	2002 NS_{17}	—	July 13, 2002	Haleakala	NEAT	·	1.2 km	MPC · JPL
179597	2002 NS_{19}	—	July 9, 2002	Socorro	LINEAR	·	1.8 km	MPC · JPL
179598	2002 NV_{21}	—	July 9, 2002	Socorro	LINEAR	·	1.3 km	MPC · JPL
179599	2002 NH_{24}	—	July 9, 2002	Socorro	LINEAR	·	1.1 km	MPC · JPL
179600	2002 NG_{29}	—	July 13, 2002	Haleakala	NEAT	·	1.3 km	MPC · JPL

== 179601–179700 ==
back to top

Designation			Discovery			Properties		Ref
Permanent	Provisional	Named after	Date	Site	Discoverer(s)	Category	Diam.	Ref
179601	2002 NE_{35}	—	July 9, 2002	Socorro	LINEAR	·	820 m	MPC · JPL
179602	2002 NO_{43}	—	July 15, 2002	Palomar	NEAT	·	1.9 km	MPC · JPL
179603	2002 NJ_{46}	—	July 13, 2002	Palomar	NEAT	·	2.4 km	MPC · JPL
179604	2002 NO_{47}	—	July 14, 2002	Socorro	LINEAR	·	1.5 km	MPC · JPL
179605	2002 NW_{57}	—	July 12, 2002	Palomar	NEAT	·	1.0 km	MPC · JPL
179606	2002 NT_{61}	—	July 12, 2002	Palomar	NEAT	V	870 m	MPC · JPL
179607	2002 OC_{6}	—	July 20, 2002	Palomar	NEAT	·	950 m	MPC · JPL
179608	2002 OP_{10}	—	July 22, 2002	Palomar	NEAT	·	1.5 km	MPC · JPL
179609	2002 OX_{16}	—	July 18, 2002	Socorro	LINEAR	(2076)	1.3 km	MPC · JPL
179610	2002 OO_{21}	—	July 17, 2002	Palomar	NEAT	·	850 m	MPC · JPL
179611	2002 OS_{23}	—	July 30, 2002	Haleakala	NEAT	EUN	3.7 km	MPC · JPL
179612	2002 OT_{29}	—	July 22, 2002	Palomar	NEAT	·	900 m	MPC · JPL
179613	2002 PU_{5}	—	August 4, 2002	Palomar	NEAT	·	1.7 km	MPC · JPL
179614	2002 PB_{13}	—	August 5, 2002	Palomar	NEAT	·	1.7 km	MPC · JPL
179615	2002 PJ_{26}	—	August 6, 2002	Palomar	NEAT	·	920 m	MPC · JPL
179616	2002 PL_{26}	—	August 6, 2002	Palomar	NEAT	·	1.4 km	MPC · JPL
179617	2002 PU_{27}	—	August 6, 2002	Palomar	NEAT	(5)	2.1 km	MPC · JPL
179618	2002 PY_{28}	—	August 6, 2002	Palomar	NEAT	MAS	910 m	MPC · JPL
179619	2002 PC_{33}	—	August 6, 2002	Palomar	NEAT	NYS	1.6 km	MPC · JPL
179620	2002 PN_{33}	—	August 6, 2002	Campo Imperatore	CINEOS	·	1.9 km	MPC · JPL
179621	2002 PY_{36}	—	August 8, 2002	Eskridge	Farpoint	·	1.6 km	MPC · JPL
179622	2002 PZ_{38}	—	August 6, 2002	Palomar	NEAT	·	870 m	MPC · JPL
179623	2002 PN_{47}	—	August 10, 2002	Socorro	LINEAR	·	1.5 km	MPC · JPL
179624	2002 PG_{54}	—	August 9, 2002	Haleakala	NEAT	·	1.1 km	MPC · JPL
179625	2002 PX_{54}	—	August 9, 2002	Socorro	LINEAR	·	1.2 km	MPC · JPL
179626	2002 PX_{56}	—	August 9, 2002	Socorro	LINEAR	·	1.7 km	MPC · JPL
179627	2002 PF_{57}	—	August 9, 2002	Socorro	LINEAR	·	1.8 km	MPC · JPL
179628	2002 PM_{58}	—	August 10, 2002	Socorro	LINEAR	·	1.2 km	MPC · JPL
179629	2002 PP_{58}	—	August 10, 2002	Socorro	LINEAR	PHO	2.0 km	MPC · JPL
179630	2002 PX_{70}	—	August 11, 2002	Socorro	LINEAR	·	1.6 km	MPC · JPL
179631	2002 PP_{74}	—	August 12, 2002	Socorro	LINEAR	V	860 m	MPC · JPL
179632	2002 PD_{86}	—	August 13, 2002	Socorro	LINEAR	JUN	4.7 km	MPC · JPL
179633	2002 PF_{91}	—	August 13, 2002	Socorro	LINEAR	·	1.7 km	MPC · JPL
179634	2002 PK_{94}	—	August 11, 2002	Haleakala	NEAT	·	1.3 km	MPC · JPL
179635	2002 PY_{95}	—	August 14, 2002	Socorro	LINEAR	·	2.0 km	MPC · JPL
179636	2002 PK_{111}	—	August 14, 2002	Palomar	NEAT	·	2.3 km	MPC · JPL
179637	2002 PB_{114}	—	August 13, 2002	Kitt Peak	Spacewatch	·	1.6 km	MPC · JPL
179638	2002 PH_{117}	—	August 14, 2002	Anderson Mesa	LONEOS	·	2.2 km	MPC · JPL
179639	2002 PZ_{119}	—	August 13, 2002	Anderson Mesa	LONEOS	·	1.7 km	MPC · JPL
179640	2002 PX_{120}	—	August 13, 2002	Anderson Mesa	LONEOS	V	940 m	MPC · JPL
179641	2002 PJ_{121}	—	August 13, 2002	Anderson Mesa	LONEOS	V	1.1 km	MPC · JPL
179642	2002 PW_{128}	—	August 14, 2002	Socorro	LINEAR	·	3.5 km	MPC · JPL
179643	2002 PT_{133}	—	August 14, 2002	Socorro	LINEAR	·	920 m	MPC · JPL
179644	2002 PF_{134}	—	August 14, 2002	Socorro	LINEAR	NYS	1.5 km	MPC · JPL
179645	2002 PH_{135}	—	August 14, 2002	Socorro	LINEAR	·	1.1 km	MPC · JPL
179646	2002 PK_{136}	—	August 14, 2002	Socorro	LINEAR	·	1.8 km	MPC · JPL
179647 Stuartrobbins	2002 PG_{152}	Stuartrobbins	August 10, 2002	Cerro Tololo	M. W. Buie	·	1.4 km	MPC · JPL
179648	2002 PE_{156}	—	August 8, 2002	Palomar	S. F. Hönig	·	940 m	MPC · JPL
179649	2002 PA_{157}	—	August 8, 2002	Palomar	S. F. Hönig	(5)	1.6 km	MPC · JPL
179650	2002 PB_{165}	—	August 8, 2002	Palomar	S. F. Hönig	·	780 m	MPC · JPL
179651	2002 PW_{168}	—	August 8, 2002	Palomar	NEAT	·	920 m	MPC · JPL
179652	2002 PJ_{171}	—	August 11, 2002	Palomar	NEAT	NYS	1.1 km	MPC · JPL
179653	2002 PX_{175}	—	August 11, 2002	Palomar	NEAT	·	1.3 km	MPC · JPL
179654	2002 PY_{182}	—	August 11, 2002	Palomar	NEAT	·	2.8 km	MPC · JPL
179655	2002 QP_{1}	—	August 16, 2002	Haleakala	NEAT	·	1.6 km	MPC · JPL
179656	2002 QQ_{3}	—	August 16, 2002	Palomar	NEAT	·	1.2 km	MPC · JPL
179657	2002 QP_{14}	—	August 26, 2002	Palomar	NEAT	slow	2.1 km	MPC · JPL
179658	2002 QG_{16}	—	August 26, 2002	Palomar	NEAT	·	2.6 km	MPC · JPL
179659	2002 QH_{18}	—	August 28, 2002	Palomar	NEAT	·	1.2 km	MPC · JPL
179660	2002 QZ_{21}	—	August 27, 2002	Palomar	NEAT	·	1.6 km	MPC · JPL
179661	2002 QU_{23}	—	August 28, 2002	Palomar	NEAT	NYS	1.3 km	MPC · JPL
179662	2002 QW_{27}	—	August 28, 2002	Palomar	NEAT	·	1.1 km	MPC · JPL
179663	2002 QH_{31}	—	August 29, 2002	Palomar	NEAT	·	1.1 km	MPC · JPL
179664	2002 QD_{32}	—	August 29, 2002	Palomar	NEAT	V	880 m	MPC · JPL
179665	2002 QM_{32}	—	August 29, 2002	Palomar	NEAT	NYS	1.7 km	MPC · JPL
179666	2002 QB_{34}	—	August 29, 2002	Palomar	NEAT	·	1.1 km	MPC · JPL
179667	2002 QU_{34}	—	August 29, 2002	Palomar	NEAT	·	1.7 km	MPC · JPL
179668	2002 QG_{35}	—	August 29, 2002	Palomar	NEAT	·	2.4 km	MPC · JPL
179669	2002 QF_{41}	—	August 29, 2002	Palomar	NEAT	·	1.1 km	MPC · JPL
179670	2002 QM_{41}	—	August 29, 2002	Palomar	NEAT	V	1.1 km	MPC · JPL
179671	2002 QL_{47}	—	August 30, 2002	Anderson Mesa	LONEOS	·	2.1 km	MPC · JPL
179672	2002 QO_{49}	—	August 20, 2002	Palomar	R. Matson	V	900 m	MPC · JPL
179673	2002 QU_{50}	—	August 29, 2002	Palomar	R. Matson	·	1.4 km	MPC · JPL
179674	2002 QL_{61}	—	August 17, 2002	Palomar	NEAT	·	980 m	MPC · JPL
179675	2002 QM_{61}	—	August 17, 2002	Palomar	NEAT	V	1.0 km	MPC · JPL
179676	2002 QF_{64}	—	August 28, 2002	Palomar	NEAT	MAS	800 m	MPC · JPL
179677	2002 QL_{64}	—	August 30, 2002	Palomar	NEAT	·	1.1 km	MPC · JPL
179678 Rietmeijer	2002 QS_{66}	Rietmeijer	August 26, 2002	Palomar	NEAT	·	1.5 km	MPC · JPL
179679	2002 QZ_{67}	—	August 28, 2002	Palomar	NEAT	·	1.6 km	MPC · JPL
179680	2002 QX_{77}	—	August 18, 2002	Palomar	NEAT	·	820 m	MPC · JPL
179681	2002 QO_{86}	—	August 17, 2002	Palomar	NEAT	·	1.7 km	MPC · JPL
179682	2002 QB_{87}	—	August 16, 2002	Nanchuan	Q. Ye	·	1.7 km	MPC · JPL
179683	2002 QY_{87}	—	August 27, 2002	Palomar	NEAT	·	1.3 km	MPC · JPL
179684	2002 QV_{89}	—	August 29, 2002	Palomar	NEAT	·	1.4 km	MPC · JPL
179685	2002 QH_{98}	—	August 18, 2002	Palomar	NEAT	·	840 m	MPC · JPL
179686	2002 QR_{109}	—	August 17, 2002	Palomar	NEAT	V	690 m	MPC · JPL
179687	2002 QM_{115}	—	August 29, 2002	Palomar	NEAT	·	810 m	MPC · JPL
179688	2002 QN_{118}	—	August 30, 2002	Palomar	NEAT	NYS	1.7 km	MPC · JPL
179689	2002 RP_{6}	—	September 1, 2002	Haleakala	NEAT	·	2.0 km	MPC · JPL
179690	2002 RP_{7}	—	September 3, 2002	Haleakala	NEAT	MAS	1.3 km	MPC · JPL
179691	2002 RS_{7}	—	September 3, 2002	Haleakala	NEAT	NYS	1.7 km	MPC · JPL
179692	2002 RO_{17}	—	September 4, 2002	Anderson Mesa	LONEOS	·	1.4 km	MPC · JPL
179693	2002 RE_{18}	—	September 4, 2002	Anderson Mesa	LONEOS	PHO	1.9 km	MPC · JPL
179694	2002 RO_{18}	—	September 4, 2002	Anderson Mesa	LONEOS	·	2.0 km	MPC · JPL
179695	2002 RL_{21}	—	September 4, 2002	Anderson Mesa	LONEOS	MAS	1.2 km	MPC · JPL
179696	2002 RT_{23}	—	September 4, 2002	Anderson Mesa	LONEOS	ERI	2.7 km	MPC · JPL
179697	2002 RR_{24}	—	September 4, 2002	Anderson Mesa	LONEOS	·	890 m	MPC · JPL
179698	2002 RX_{27}	—	September 4, 2002	Anderson Mesa	LONEOS	·	2.0 km	MPC · JPL
179699	2002 RC_{28}	—	September 5, 2002	Socorro	LINEAR	·	3.9 km	MPC · JPL
179700	2002 RQ_{29}	—	September 3, 2002	Haleakala	NEAT	·	1.4 km	MPC · JPL

== 179701–179800 ==
back to top

Designation			Discovery			Properties		Ref
Permanent	Provisional	Named after	Date	Site	Discoverer(s)	Category	Diam.	Ref
179701	2002 RU_{31}	—	September 4, 2002	Anderson Mesa	LONEOS	V	1.0 km	MPC · JPL
179702	2002 RP_{32}	—	September 4, 2002	Anderson Mesa	LONEOS	·	1.6 km	MPC · JPL
179703	2002 RC_{39}	—	September 5, 2002	Socorro	LINEAR	NYS	2.0 km	MPC · JPL
179704	2002 RV_{39}	—	September 5, 2002	Socorro	LINEAR	·	1.1 km	MPC · JPL
179705	2002 RL_{42}	—	September 5, 2002	Socorro	LINEAR	·	3.0 km	MPC · JPL
179706	2002 RS_{42}	—	September 5, 2002	Socorro	LINEAR	V	830 m	MPC · JPL
179707	2002 RU_{42}	—	September 5, 2002	Socorro	LINEAR	·	1.4 km	MPC · JPL
179708	2002 RA_{48}	—	September 5, 2002	Socorro	LINEAR	·	1.2 km	MPC · JPL
179709	2002 RK_{48}	—	September 5, 2002	Socorro	LINEAR	NYS	1.5 km	MPC · JPL
179710	2002 RC_{50}	—	September 5, 2002	Socorro	LINEAR	·	1.8 km	MPC · JPL
179711	2002 RP_{56}	—	September 5, 2002	Anderson Mesa	LONEOS	·	1.7 km	MPC · JPL
179712	2002 RA_{57}	—	September 5, 2002	Anderson Mesa	LONEOS	·	1.8 km	MPC · JPL
179713	2002 RJ_{59}	—	September 5, 2002	Anderson Mesa	LONEOS	·	1.5 km	MPC · JPL
179714	2002 RD_{62}	—	September 5, 2002	Socorro	LINEAR	·	2.2 km	MPC · JPL
179715	2002 RR_{62}	—	September 5, 2002	Socorro	LINEAR	·	2.0 km	MPC · JPL
179716	2002 RC_{63}	—	September 5, 2002	Socorro	LINEAR	PHO	2.3 km	MPC · JPL
179717	2002 RB_{66}	—	September 5, 2002	Socorro	LINEAR	NYS	1.2 km	MPC · JPL
179718	2002 RM_{67}	—	September 3, 2002	Palomar	NEAT	V	1.4 km	MPC · JPL
179719	2002 RU_{79}	—	September 5, 2002	Socorro	LINEAR	·	1.2 km	MPC · JPL
179720	2002 RJ_{81}	—	September 5, 2002	Socorro	LINEAR	·	1.3 km	MPC · JPL
179721	2002 RC_{85}	—	September 5, 2002	Socorro	LINEAR	·	1.8 km	MPC · JPL
179722	2002 RA_{87}	—	September 5, 2002	Socorro	LINEAR	·	2.4 km	MPC · JPL
179723	2002 RS_{87}	—	September 5, 2002	Socorro	LINEAR	·	4.5 km	MPC · JPL
179724	2002 RL_{90}	—	September 5, 2002	Socorro	LINEAR	·	910 m	MPC · JPL
179725	2002 RZ_{90}	—	September 5, 2002	Socorro	LINEAR	JUN	1.1 km	MPC · JPL
179726	2002 RD_{91}	—	September 5, 2002	Socorro	LINEAR	NYS	1.1 km	MPC · JPL
179727	2002 RF_{95}	—	September 5, 2002	Socorro	LINEAR	NYS	1.6 km	MPC · JPL
179728	2002 RG_{95}	—	September 5, 2002	Socorro	LINEAR	V	1.2 km	MPC · JPL
179729	2002 RW_{95}	—	September 5, 2002	Socorro	LINEAR	·	1.3 km	MPC · JPL
179730	2002 RY_{96}	—	September 5, 2002	Socorro	LINEAR	V	1.1 km	MPC · JPL
179731	2002 RW_{99}	—	September 5, 2002	Socorro	LINEAR	·	2.0 km	MPC · JPL
179732	2002 RC_{101}	—	September 5, 2002	Socorro	LINEAR	·	8.4 km	MPC · JPL
179733	2002 RS_{103}	—	September 5, 2002	Socorro	LINEAR	·	1.7 km	MPC · JPL
179734	2002 RB_{105}	—	September 5, 2002	Socorro	LINEAR	·	1.9 km	MPC · JPL
179735	2002 RV_{108}	—	September 5, 2002	Haleakala	NEAT	(1338) (FLO)	1.0 km	MPC · JPL
179736	2002 RE_{110}	—	September 6, 2002	Socorro	LINEAR	·	1.7 km	MPC · JPL
179737	2002 RE_{115}	—	September 6, 2002	Socorro	LINEAR	·	1.7 km	MPC · JPL
179738	2002 RB_{118}	—	September 5, 2002	Kvistaberg	Uppsala-DLR Asteroid Survey	·	2.6 km	MPC · JPL
179739	2002 RJ_{124}	—	September 9, 2002	Palomar	NEAT	GEF	1.9 km	MPC · JPL
179740	2002 RY_{135}	—	September 11, 2002	Haleakala	NEAT	·	1.2 km	MPC · JPL
179741	2002 RP_{141}	—	September 10, 2002	Haleakala	NEAT	V	1.1 km	MPC · JPL
179742	2002 RZ_{147}	—	September 11, 2002	Palomar	NEAT	·	1.2 km	MPC · JPL
179743	2002 RY_{153}	—	September 13, 2002	Kitt Peak	Spacewatch	·	1.4 km	MPC · JPL
179744	2002 RV_{155}	—	September 11, 2002	Palomar	NEAT	·	1.4 km	MPC · JPL
179745	2002 RF_{160}	—	September 12, 2002	Palomar	NEAT	(5)	1.6 km	MPC · JPL
179746	2002 RG_{162}	—	September 12, 2002	Palomar	NEAT	·	2.1 km	MPC · JPL
179747	2002 RK_{170}	—	September 13, 2002	Palomar	NEAT	·	3.3 km	MPC · JPL
179748	2002 RG_{174}	—	September 13, 2002	Palomar	NEAT	·	1.2 km	MPC · JPL
179749	2002 RT_{188}	—	September 13, 2002	Palomar	NEAT	·	2.0 km	MPC · JPL
179750	2002 RL_{201}	—	September 13, 2002	Socorro	LINEAR	·	1.6 km	MPC · JPL
179751	2002 RP_{203}	—	September 14, 2002	Palomar	NEAT	·	1.2 km	MPC · JPL
179752	2002 RW_{204}	—	September 14, 2002	Palomar	NEAT	V	840 m	MPC · JPL
179753	2002 RJ_{205}	—	September 14, 2002	Palomar	NEAT	·	1.6 km	MPC · JPL
179754	2002 RR_{206}	—	September 14, 2002	Palomar	NEAT	·	1.6 km	MPC · JPL
179755	2002 RL_{211}	—	September 14, 2002	Haleakala	NEAT	·	2.0 km	MPC · JPL
179756	2002 RH_{212}	—	September 15, 2002	Haleakala	NEAT	·	2.6 km	MPC · JPL
179757	2002 RT_{216}	—	September 13, 2002	Haleakala	NEAT	V	1.0 km	MPC · JPL
179758	2002 RV_{216}	—	September 14, 2002	Palomar	NEAT	·	1.2 km	MPC · JPL
179759	2002 RP_{220}	—	September 15, 2002	Haleakala	NEAT	·	2.0 km	MPC · JPL
179760	2002 RO_{230}	—	September 15, 2002	Palomar	NEAT	·	1.4 km	MPC · JPL
179761	2002 RK_{240}	—	September 1, 2002	Palomar	S. F. Hönig	MAS	1.0 km	MPC · JPL
179762	2002 RB_{242}	—	September 14, 2002	Palomar	R. Matson	JUN	1.5 km	MPC · JPL
179763	2002 RX_{242}	—	September 13, 2002	Palomar	NEAT	·	1.5 km	MPC · JPL
179764 Myriamsarah	2002 SC	Myriamsarah	September 16, 2002	Vicques	M. Ory	V	1.1 km	MPC · JPL
179765	2002 SQ_{6}	—	September 27, 2002	Palomar	NEAT	·	2.0 km	MPC · JPL
179766	2002 SZ_{6}	—	September 27, 2002	Palomar	NEAT	·	1.4 km	MPC · JPL
179767	2002 SK_{8}	—	September 27, 2002	Palomar	NEAT	·	1.4 km	MPC · JPL
179768	2002 SP_{8}	—	September 27, 2002	Palomar	NEAT	·	1.6 km	MPC · JPL
179769	2002 SO_{18}	—	September 26, 2002	Palomar	NEAT	·	1.3 km	MPC · JPL
179770	2002 SO_{20}	—	September 26, 2002	Palomar	NEAT	·	1.2 km	MPC · JPL
179771	2002 SB_{30}	—	September 28, 2002	Haleakala	NEAT	·	2.0 km	MPC · JPL
179772	2002 SO_{31}	—	September 28, 2002	Haleakala	NEAT	·	2.4 km	MPC · JPL
179773	2002 SZ_{36}	—	September 29, 2002	Haleakala	NEAT	·	2.1 km	MPC · JPL
179774	2002 SR_{40}	—	September 30, 2002	Haleakala	NEAT	·	1.9 km	MPC · JPL
179775	2002 SK_{41}	—	September 29, 2002	Haleakala	NEAT	·	1.3 km	MPC · JPL
179776	2002 SR_{44}	—	September 29, 2002	Haleakala	NEAT	·	1.7 km	MPC · JPL
179777	2002 SR_{47}	—	September 30, 2002	Socorro	LINEAR	(1338) (FLO)	1.0 km	MPC · JPL
179778	2002 SY_{47}	—	September 30, 2002	Socorro	LINEAR	·	1.5 km	MPC · JPL
179779	2002 SZ_{58}	—	September 30, 2002	Socorro	LINEAR	NYS	1.6 km	MPC · JPL
179780	2002 SB_{60}	—	September 16, 2002	Palomar	NEAT	·	2.1 km	MPC · JPL
179781	2002 SP_{63}	—	September 26, 2002	Palomar	NEAT	·	1.5 km	MPC · JPL
179782	2002 SE_{65}	—	September 17, 2002	Palomar	NEAT	·	1.4 km	MPC · JPL
179783	2002 SD_{66}	—	September 16, 2002	Palomar	NEAT	·	1.7 km	MPC · JPL
179784	2002 ST_{70}	—	September 16, 2002	Palomar	NEAT	·	1.4 km	MPC · JPL
179785	2002 TB_{1}	—	October 1, 2002	Anderson Mesa	LONEOS	·	1.6 km	MPC · JPL
179786	2002 TX_{2}	—	October 1, 2002	Anderson Mesa	LONEOS	MAS	1.1 km	MPC · JPL
179787	2002 TU_{4}	—	October 1, 2002	Socorro	LINEAR	·	3.0 km	MPC · JPL
179788	2002 TM_{8}	—	October 1, 2002	Haleakala	NEAT	·	1.4 km	MPC · JPL
179789	2002 TO_{13}	—	October 1, 2002	Socorro	LINEAR	·	1.5 km	MPC · JPL
179790	2002 TE_{14}	—	October 1, 2002	Socorro	LINEAR	·	1.8 km	MPC · JPL
179791	2002 TM_{19}	—	October 2, 2002	Socorro	LINEAR	·	1.3 km	MPC · JPL
179792	2002 TC_{20}	—	October 2, 2002	Socorro	LINEAR	(5)	1.4 km	MPC · JPL
179793	2002 TJ_{21}	—	October 2, 2002	Socorro	LINEAR	·	1.1 km	MPC · JPL
179794	2002 TB_{26}	—	October 2, 2002	Socorro	LINEAR	·	1.3 km	MPC · JPL
179795	2002 TS_{27}	—	October 2, 2002	Socorro	LINEAR	·	1.2 km	MPC · JPL
179796	2002 TD_{30}	—	October 2, 2002	Socorro	LINEAR	EUN	1.8 km	MPC · JPL
179797	2002 TH_{33}	—	October 2, 2002	Socorro	LINEAR	NYS	1.5 km	MPC · JPL
179798	2002 TQ_{35}	—	October 2, 2002	Socorro	LINEAR	·	1.4 km	MPC · JPL
179799	2002 TA_{38}	—	October 2, 2002	Socorro	LINEAR	·	1.5 km	MPC · JPL
179800	2002 TN_{38}	—	October 2, 2002	Socorro	LINEAR	MAS	1.1 km	MPC · JPL

== 179801–179900 ==
back to top

Designation			Discovery			Properties		Ref
Permanent	Provisional	Named after	Date	Site	Discoverer(s)	Category	Diam.	Ref
179801	2002 TX_{38}	—	October 2, 2002	Socorro	LINEAR	·	2.2 km	MPC · JPL
179802	2002 TW_{43}	—	October 2, 2002	Socorro	LINEAR	RAF	1.4 km	MPC · JPL
179803	2002 TR_{54}	—	October 2, 2002	Socorro	LINEAR	·	1.2 km	MPC · JPL
179804	2002 TK_{62}	—	October 3, 2002	Campo Imperatore	CINEOS	·	2.8 km	MPC · JPL
179805	2002 TS_{62}	—	October 3, 2002	Campo Imperatore	CINEOS	·	3.1 km	MPC · JPL
179806	2002 TD_{66}	—	October 5, 2002	Socorro	LINEAR	APO · PHA · critical	290 m	MPC · JPL
179807	2002 TO_{68}	—	October 6, 2002	Haleakala	NEAT	·	2.4 km	MPC · JPL
179808	2002 TY_{69}	—	October 9, 2002	Tenagra II	C. W. Juels, P. R. Holvorcem	EUN	1.9 km	MPC · JPL
179809	2002 TZ_{72}	—	October 3, 2002	Palomar	NEAT	·	2.5 km	MPC · JPL
179810	2002 TC_{75}	—	October 1, 2002	Anderson Mesa	LONEOS	·	1.7 km	MPC · JPL
179811	2002 TU_{75}	—	October 1, 2002	Anderson Mesa	LONEOS	·	1.8 km	MPC · JPL
179812	2002 TD_{78}	—	October 1, 2002	Anderson Mesa	LONEOS	·	1.9 km	MPC · JPL
179813	2002 TB_{79}	—	October 1, 2002	Socorro	LINEAR	·	1.9 km	MPC · JPL
179814	2002 TD_{80}	—	October 1, 2002	Anderson Mesa	LONEOS	·	1.5 km	MPC · JPL
179815	2002 TV_{80}	—	October 1, 2002	Socorro	LINEAR	PHO	1.9 km	MPC · JPL
179816	2002 TF_{86}	—	October 2, 2002	Campo Imperatore	CINEOS	·	2.0 km	MPC · JPL
179817	2002 TE_{89}	—	October 3, 2002	Palomar	NEAT	·	2.2 km	MPC · JPL
179818	2002 TC_{95}	—	October 3, 2002	Socorro	LINEAR	·	1.1 km	MPC · JPL
179819	2002 TJ_{95}	—	October 3, 2002	Socorro	LINEAR	·	1.5 km	MPC · JPL
179820	2002 TQ_{102}	—	October 4, 2002	Socorro	LINEAR	NYS	1.5 km	MPC · JPL
179821	2002 TB_{104}	—	October 4, 2002	Socorro	LINEAR	·	1.7 km	MPC · JPL
179822	2002 TC_{115}	—	October 3, 2002	Palomar	NEAT	·	3.4 km	MPC · JPL
179823	2002 TE_{121}	—	October 3, 2002	Palomar	NEAT	·	1.7 km	MPC · JPL
179824	2002 TN_{126}	—	October 4, 2002	Socorro	LINEAR	·	1.3 km	MPC · JPL
179825	2002 TO_{130}	—	October 4, 2002	Socorro	LINEAR	·	2.0 km	MPC · JPL
179826	2002 TE_{131}	—	October 4, 2002	Socorro	LINEAR	·	2.2 km	MPC · JPL
179827	2002 TQ_{131}	—	October 4, 2002	Socorro	LINEAR	·	1.5 km	MPC · JPL
179828	2002 TP_{133}	—	October 4, 2002	Anderson Mesa	LONEOS	·	1.8 km	MPC · JPL
179829	2002 TW_{161}	—	October 5, 2002	Palomar	NEAT	MAR	1.2 km	MPC · JPL
179830	2002 TX_{162}	—	October 5, 2002	Palomar	NEAT	·	1.8 km	MPC · JPL
179831	2002 TC_{165}	—	October 2, 2002	Haleakala	NEAT	·	4.0 km	MPC · JPL
179832	2002 TB_{179}	—	October 13, 2002	Palomar	NEAT	·	2.1 km	MPC · JPL
179833	2002 TB_{180}	—	October 14, 2002	Socorro	LINEAR	EUN	2.2 km	MPC · JPL
179834	2002 TX_{180}	—	October 14, 2002	Socorro	LINEAR	·	2.7 km	MPC · JPL
179835	2002 TX_{183}	—	October 4, 2002	Socorro	LINEAR	·	2.6 km	MPC · JPL
179836	2002 TN_{198}	—	October 5, 2002	Socorro	LINEAR	EUN	1.6 km	MPC · JPL
179837	2002 TE_{215}	—	October 4, 2002	Socorro	LINEAR	·	1.7 km	MPC · JPL
179838	2002 TC_{218}	—	October 5, 2002	Socorro	LINEAR	·	1.9 km	MPC · JPL
179839	2002 TY_{220}	—	October 6, 2002	Socorro	LINEAR	·	4.1 km	MPC · JPL
179840	2002 TT_{222}	—	October 7, 2002	Socorro	LINEAR	·	1.8 km	MPC · JPL
179841	2002 TB_{224}	—	October 8, 2002	Anderson Mesa	LONEOS	·	1.8 km	MPC · JPL
179842	2002 TK_{225}	—	October 8, 2002	Anderson Mesa	LONEOS	·	1.5 km	MPC · JPL
179843	2002 TN_{225}	—	October 8, 2002	Anderson Mesa	LONEOS	(5)	1.6 km	MPC · JPL
179844	2002 TD_{229}	—	October 7, 2002	Haleakala	NEAT	·	1.7 km	MPC · JPL
179845	2002 TS_{238}	—	October 7, 2002	Socorro	LINEAR	·	2.7 km	MPC · JPL
179846	2002 TC_{246}	—	October 9, 2002	Anderson Mesa	LONEOS	·	1.9 km	MPC · JPL
179847	2002 TY_{246}	—	October 9, 2002	Kitt Peak	Spacewatch	(5)	1.3 km	MPC · JPL
179848	2002 TX_{248}	—	October 7, 2002	Socorro	LINEAR	·	1.5 km	MPC · JPL
179849	2002 TL_{251}	—	October 7, 2002	Haleakala	NEAT	·	2.1 km	MPC · JPL
179850	2002 TO_{253}	—	October 8, 2002	Anderson Mesa	LONEOS	V	1.1 km	MPC · JPL
179851	2002 TP_{253}	—	October 8, 2002	Anderson Mesa	LONEOS	·	2.0 km	MPC · JPL
179852	2002 TC_{255}	—	October 9, 2002	Anderson Mesa	LONEOS	·	2.8 km	MPC · JPL
179853	2002 TR_{257}	—	October 9, 2002	Socorro	LINEAR	·	1.9 km	MPC · JPL
179854	2002 TT_{258}	—	October 9, 2002	Socorro	LINEAR	·	2.1 km	MPC · JPL
179855	2002 TQ_{260}	—	October 9, 2002	Socorro	LINEAR	·	2.2 km	MPC · JPL
179856	2002 TV_{265}	—	October 10, 2002	Socorro	LINEAR	EUN	2.1 km	MPC · JPL
179857	2002 TE_{266}	—	October 10, 2002	Socorro	LINEAR	·	2.2 km	MPC · JPL
179858	2002 TZ_{266}	—	October 10, 2002	Socorro	LINEAR	·	3.2 km	MPC · JPL
179859	2002 TP_{267}	—	October 8, 2002	Anderson Mesa	LONEOS	·	1.6 km	MPC · JPL
179860	2002 TR_{270}	—	October 9, 2002	Socorro	LINEAR	·	2.0 km	MPC · JPL
179861	2002 TD_{271}	—	October 9, 2002	Socorro	LINEAR	RAF	1.1 km	MPC · JPL
179862	2002 TE_{272}	—	October 9, 2002	Socorro	LINEAR	·	1.8 km	MPC · JPL
179863	2002 TF_{272}	—	October 9, 2002	Socorro	LINEAR	·	2.4 km	MPC · JPL
179864	2002 TM_{274}	—	October 9, 2002	Socorro	LINEAR	·	1.9 km	MPC · JPL
179865	2002 TZ_{274}	—	October 9, 2002	Socorro	LINEAR	·	1.7 km	MPC · JPL
179866	2002 TG_{278}	—	October 10, 2002	Socorro	LINEAR	·	4.1 km	MPC · JPL
179867	2002 TS_{281}	—	October 10, 2002	Socorro	LINEAR	·	1.6 km	MPC · JPL
179868	2002 TH_{283}	—	October 10, 2002	Socorro	LINEAR	V	1.3 km	MPC · JPL
179869	2002 TQ_{290}	—	October 10, 2002	Socorro	LINEAR	V	1.1 km	MPC · JPL
179870	2002 TR_{291}	—	October 10, 2002	Socorro	LINEAR	·	3.1 km	MPC · JPL
179871	2002 TV_{292}	—	October 10, 2002	Socorro	LINEAR	JUN	2.2 km	MPC · JPL
179872	2002 TR_{298}	—	October 12, 2002	Socorro	LINEAR	·	1.8 km	MPC · JPL
179873	2002 TA_{303}	—	October 11, 2002	Socorro	LINEAR	·	1.7 km	MPC · JPL
179874 Bojanvršnak	2002 TS_{315}	Bojanvršnak	October 4, 2002	Apache Point	SDSS	·	2.1 km	MPC · JPL
179875 Budavari	2002 TX_{328}	Budavari	October 5, 2002	Apache Point	SDSS	V	820 m	MPC · JPL
179876 Goranpichler	2002 TS_{333}	Goranpichler	October 5, 2002	Apache Point	SDSS	·	1.1 km	MPC · JPL
179877 Pavlovski	2002 TK_{340}	Pavlovski	October 5, 2002	Apache Point	SDSS	·	1.2 km	MPC · JPL
179878	2002 TX_{375}	—	October 4, 2002	Anderson Mesa	LONEOS	·	1.9 km	MPC · JPL
179879	2002 UB	—	October 16, 2002	Palomar	NEAT	·	840 m	MPC · JPL
179880	2002 UE	—	October 18, 2002	Palomar	NEAT	·	1.7 km	MPC · JPL
179881	2002 UZ_{8}	—	October 28, 2002	Palomar	NEAT	·	1.8 km	MPC · JPL
179882	2002 UA_{15}	—	October 30, 2002	Socorro	LINEAR	EUN	1.5 km	MPC · JPL
179883	2002 UE_{16}	—	October 30, 2002	Palomar	NEAT	KON	3.6 km	MPC · JPL
179884	2002 UN_{16}	—	October 30, 2002	Palomar	NEAT	(5)	2.2 km	MPC · JPL
179885	2002 UK_{19}	—	October 30, 2002	Haleakala	NEAT	·	2.2 km	MPC · JPL
179886	2002 UU_{20}	—	October 28, 2002	Haleakala	NEAT	·	1.9 km	MPC · JPL
179887	2002 UE_{21}	—	October 30, 2002	Palomar	NEAT	·	1.9 km	MPC · JPL
179888	2002 UX_{26}	—	October 31, 2002	Socorro	LINEAR	(5)	2.0 km	MPC · JPL
179889	2002 UQ_{27}	—	October 31, 2002	Palomar	NEAT	·	2.2 km	MPC · JPL
179890	2002 UA_{28}	—	October 30, 2002	Palomar	NEAT	·	4.8 km	MPC · JPL
179891	2002 UO_{28}	—	October 30, 2002	Palomar	NEAT	·	2.1 km	MPC · JPL
179892	2002 UB_{35}	—	October 31, 2002	Socorro	LINEAR	V	990 m	MPC · JPL
179893	2002 UH_{37}	—	October 31, 2002	Anderson Mesa	LONEOS	·	1.6 km	MPC · JPL
179894	2002 UT_{37}	—	October 31, 2002	Palomar	NEAT	·	1.8 km	MPC · JPL
179895	2002 UW_{37}	—	October 31, 2002	Palomar	NEAT	·	2.2 km	MPC · JPL
179896	2002 UT_{38}	—	October 31, 2002	Palomar	NEAT	(5)	1.9 km	MPC · JPL
179897	2002 UW_{39}	—	October 31, 2002	La Palma	La Palma	NYS	2.1 km	MPC · JPL
179898	2002 UW_{45}	—	October 31, 2002	Socorro	LINEAR	·	2.4 km	MPC · JPL
179899	2002 UD_{46}	—	October 31, 2002	Socorro	LINEAR	·	2.7 km	MPC · JPL
179900	2002 UO_{48}	—	October 31, 2002	Socorro	LINEAR	·	2.1 km	MPC · JPL

== 179901–180000 ==
back to top

Designation			Discovery			Properties		Ref
Permanent	Provisional	Named after	Date	Site	Discoverer(s)	Category	Diam.	Ref
179901 Romanbrajša	2002 UA_{67}	Romanbrajša	October 30, 2002	Apache Point	SDSS	·	1.0 km	MPC · JPL
179902	2002 VO_{4}	—	November 4, 2002	Palomar	NEAT	L5	10 km	MPC · JPL
179903	2002 VK_{7}	—	November 4, 2002	Haleakala	NEAT	·	2.1 km	MPC · JPL
179904	2002 VE_{11}	—	November 1, 2002	Palomar	NEAT	·	1.3 km	MPC · JPL
179905	2002 VE_{13}	—	November 4, 2002	Palomar	NEAT	·	3.4 km	MPC · JPL
179906	2002 VN_{17}	—	November 5, 2002	Socorro	LINEAR	(5)	2.9 km	MPC · JPL
179907	2002 VL_{20}	—	November 5, 2002	Kvistaberg	Uppsala-DLR Asteroid Survey	·	1.3 km	MPC · JPL
179908	2002 VU_{22}	—	November 5, 2002	Socorro	LINEAR	·	2.1 km	MPC · JPL
179909	2002 VJ_{23}	—	November 5, 2002	Socorro	LINEAR	·	2.7 km	MPC · JPL
179910	2002 VN_{24}	—	November 5, 2002	Socorro	LINEAR	·	2.6 km	MPC · JPL
179911	2002 VZ_{27}	—	November 5, 2002	Anderson Mesa	LONEOS	·	2.7 km	MPC · JPL
179912	2002 VZ_{28}	—	November 5, 2002	Anderson Mesa	LONEOS	·	1.7 km	MPC · JPL
179913	2002 VU_{29}	—	November 5, 2002	Socorro	LINEAR	·	2.6 km	MPC · JPL
179914	2002 VF_{34}	—	November 5, 2002	Socorro	LINEAR	·	1.7 km	MPC · JPL
179915	2002 VE_{35}	—	November 5, 2002	Socorro	LINEAR	·	2.8 km	MPC · JPL
179916	2002 VM_{40}	—	November 5, 2002	Socorro	LINEAR	·	2.9 km	MPC · JPL
179917	2002 VF_{43}	—	November 4, 2002	Palomar	NEAT	·	1.7 km	MPC · JPL
179918	2002 VZ_{47}	—	November 5, 2002	Socorro	LINEAR	·	5.1 km	MPC · JPL
179919	2002 VL_{48}	—	November 5, 2002	Socorro	LINEAR	JUN	2.0 km	MPC · JPL
179920	2002 VQ_{48}	—	November 5, 2002	Socorro	LINEAR	·	1.5 km	MPC · JPL
179921	2002 VL_{49}	—	November 5, 2002	Anderson Mesa	LONEOS	·	2.0 km	MPC · JPL
179922	2002 VA_{51}	—	November 6, 2002	Anderson Mesa	LONEOS	·	2.6 km	MPC · JPL
179923	2002 VO_{58}	—	November 6, 2002	Haleakala	NEAT	·	2.0 km	MPC · JPL
179924	2002 VM_{59}	—	November 3, 2002	Haleakala	NEAT	fast?	2.5 km	MPC · JPL
179925	2002 VO_{59}	—	November 3, 2002	Haleakala	NEAT	·	2.2 km	MPC · JPL
179926	2002 VV_{68}	—	November 7, 2002	Anderson Mesa	LONEOS	EUN	2.1 km	MPC · JPL
179927	2002 VA_{69}	—	November 8, 2002	Socorro	LINEAR	ADE	4.7 km	MPC · JPL
179928	2002 VJ_{69}	—	November 8, 2002	Socorro	LINEAR	·	2.1 km	MPC · JPL
179929	2002 VY_{72}	—	November 7, 2002	Socorro	LINEAR	KON	2.7 km	MPC · JPL
179930	2002 VV_{75}	—	November 7, 2002	Socorro	LINEAR	·	2.5 km	MPC · JPL
179931	2002 VY_{77}	—	November 7, 2002	Socorro	LINEAR	·	2.6 km	MPC · JPL
179932	2002 VL_{78}	—	November 7, 2002	Socorro	LINEAR	·	1.7 km	MPC · JPL
179933	2002 VW_{79}	—	November 7, 2002	Socorro	LINEAR	·	2.1 km	MPC · JPL
179934	2002 VV_{80}	—	November 7, 2002	Socorro	LINEAR	·	2.8 km	MPC · JPL
179935	2002 VH_{81}	—	November 7, 2002	Socorro	LINEAR	·	2.4 km	MPC · JPL
179936	2002 VY_{81}	—	November 7, 2002	Socorro	LINEAR	·	2.3 km	MPC · JPL
179937	2002 VM_{85}	—	November 11, 2002	Anderson Mesa	LONEOS	SUL	2.9 km	MPC · JPL
179938	2002 VK_{88}	—	November 11, 2002	Socorro	LINEAR	·	2.8 km	MPC · JPL
179939	2002 VK_{89}	—	November 11, 2002	Socorro	LINEAR	(5)	1.8 km	MPC · JPL
179940	2002 VJ_{90}	—	November 11, 2002	Anderson Mesa	LONEOS	·	2.1 km	MPC · JPL
179941	2002 VK_{96}	—	November 11, 2002	Anderson Mesa	LONEOS	·	2.1 km	MPC · JPL
179942	2002 VQ_{104}	—	November 12, 2002	Socorro	LINEAR	·	2.1 km	MPC · JPL
179943	2002 VA_{106}	—	November 12, 2002	Socorro	LINEAR	·	2.2 km	MPC · JPL
179944	2002 VD_{109}	—	November 12, 2002	Socorro	LINEAR	EUN	2.6 km	MPC · JPL
179945	2002 VF_{109}	—	November 12, 2002	Socorro	LINEAR	·	2.3 km	MPC · JPL
179946	2002 VK_{113}	—	November 13, 2002	Palomar	NEAT	(5)	3.3 km	MPC · JPL
179947	2002 VB_{114}	—	November 13, 2002	Palomar	NEAT	·	3.1 km	MPC · JPL
179948	2002 VQ_{125}	—	November 14, 2002	Socorro	LINEAR	·	1.9 km	MPC · JPL
179949	2002 WR_{5}	—	November 23, 2002	Palomar	NEAT	(5)	1.8 km	MPC · JPL
179950	2002 WW_{5}	—	November 23, 2002	Palomar	NEAT	·	3.2 km	MPC · JPL
179951	2002 WW_{6}	—	November 24, 2002	Palomar	NEAT	(5)	2.1 km	MPC · JPL
179952	2002 WH_{8}	—	November 24, 2002	Palomar	NEAT	·	2.2 km	MPC · JPL
179953	2002 WL_{10}	—	November 24, 2002	Palomar	NEAT	·	1.5 km	MPC · JPL
179954	2002 WO_{10}	—	November 24, 2002	Palomar	NEAT	·	4.1 km	MPC · JPL
179955	2002 WN_{16}	—	November 28, 2002	Haleakala	NEAT	526	3.8 km	MPC · JPL
179956	2002 WV_{18}	—	November 30, 2002	Socorro	LINEAR	·	5.0 km	MPC · JPL
179957	2002 WF_{20}	—	November 25, 2002	Palomar	S. F. Hönig	·	1.7 km	MPC · JPL
179958	2002 WJ_{20}	—	November 23, 2002	Palomar	S. F. Hönig	·	1.6 km	MPC · JPL
179959	2002 XO	—	December 1, 2002	Socorro	LINEAR	·	2.3 km	MPC · JPL
179960	2002 XF_{2}	—	December 1, 2002	Socorro	LINEAR	·	2.1 km	MPC · JPL
179961	2002 XV_{3}	—	December 2, 2002	Socorro	LINEAR	·	2.1 km	MPC · JPL
179962	2002 XZ_{3}	—	December 2, 2002	Socorro	LINEAR	·	2.0 km	MPC · JPL
179963	2002 XO_{8}	—	December 2, 2002	Socorro	LINEAR	·	2.1 km	MPC · JPL
179964	2002 XT_{8}	—	December 2, 2002	Socorro	LINEAR	(5)	1.7 km	MPC · JPL
179965	2002 XW_{13}	—	December 3, 2002	Palomar	NEAT	·	1.9 km	MPC · JPL
179966	2002 XJ_{20}	—	December 2, 2002	Socorro	LINEAR	·	2.0 km	MPC · JPL
179967	2002 XE_{23}	—	December 5, 2002	Socorro	LINEAR	(5)	2.0 km	MPC · JPL
179968	2002 XH_{28}	—	December 5, 2002	Socorro	LINEAR	·	3.1 km	MPC · JPL
179969	2002 XM_{33}	—	December 7, 2002	Palomar	NEAT	·	4.0 km	MPC · JPL
179970	2002 XG_{34}	—	December 5, 2002	Socorro	LINEAR	·	2.2 km	MPC · JPL
179971	2002 XQ_{34}	—	December 6, 2002	Socorro	LINEAR	·	2.1 km	MPC · JPL
179972	2002 XV_{34}	—	December 6, 2002	Socorro	LINEAR	·	2.4 km	MPC · JPL
179973	2002 XZ_{36}	—	December 6, 2002	Socorro	LINEAR	·	3.4 km	MPC · JPL
179974	2002 XE_{37}	—	December 7, 2002	Socorro	LINEAR	EUN	2.3 km	MPC · JPL
179975	2002 XV_{41}	—	December 6, 2002	Socorro	LINEAR	·	2.3 km	MPC · JPL
179976	2002 XS_{42}	—	December 8, 2002	Kitt Peak	Spacewatch	·	2.8 km	MPC · JPL
179977	2002 XA_{43}	—	December 9, 2002	Kitt Peak	Spacewatch	slow	2.5 km	MPC · JPL
179978	2002 XR_{46}	—	December 7, 2002	Socorro	LINEAR	·	3.5 km	MPC · JPL
179979	2002 XS_{48}	—	December 10, 2002	Socorro	LINEAR	·	2.4 km	MPC · JPL
179980	2002 XB_{49}	—	December 10, 2002	Socorro	LINEAR	·	2.8 km	MPC · JPL
179981	2002 XV_{51}	—	December 10, 2002	Socorro	LINEAR	·	2.5 km	MPC · JPL
179982	2002 XB_{52}	—	December 10, 2002	Socorro	LINEAR	·	2.3 km	MPC · JPL
179983	2002 XE_{52}	—	December 10, 2002	Socorro	LINEAR	·	2.0 km	MPC · JPL
179984	2002 XQ_{53}	—	December 10, 2002	Palomar	NEAT	·	1.6 km	MPC · JPL
179985	2002 XX_{55}	—	December 10, 2002	Palomar	NEAT	·	2.7 km	MPC · JPL
179986	2002 XF_{62}	—	December 11, 2002	Socorro	LINEAR	·	2.0 km	MPC · JPL
179987	2002 XN_{62}	—	December 11, 2002	Socorro	LINEAR	·	2.9 km	MPC · JPL
179988	2002 XQ_{66}	—	December 10, 2002	Socorro	LINEAR	·	2.1 km	MPC · JPL
179989	2002 XU_{71}	—	December 11, 2002	Socorro	LINEAR	JUN	2.4 km	MPC · JPL
179990	2002 XX_{75}	—	December 11, 2002	Socorro	LINEAR	·	3.7 km	MPC · JPL
179991	2002 XO_{78}	—	December 11, 2002	Socorro	LINEAR	DOR	3.7 km	MPC · JPL
179992	2002 XE_{80}	—	December 11, 2002	Socorro	LINEAR	·	2.7 km	MPC · JPL
179993	2002 XT_{81}	—	December 11, 2002	Socorro	LINEAR	·	2.6 km	MPC · JPL
179994	2002 XH_{85}	—	December 11, 2002	Socorro	LINEAR	·	3.3 km	MPC · JPL
179995	2002 XY_{95}	—	December 5, 2002	Socorro	LINEAR	·	2.1 km	MPC · JPL
179996	2002 XW_{102}	—	December 5, 2002	Socorro	LINEAR	(5)	2.4 km	MPC · JPL
179997	2002 XY_{108}	—	December 6, 2002	Socorro	LINEAR	·	1.7 km	MPC · JPL
179998	2002 XL_{115}	—	December 2, 2002	Socorro	LINEAR	·	2.3 km	MPC · JPL
179999	2002 YL	—	December 27, 2002	Anderson Mesa	LONEOS	·	4.0 km	MPC · JPL
180000	2002 YT	—	December 27, 2002	Anderson Mesa	LONEOS	·	3.1 km	MPC · JPL

back to top

== See also ==
- Meanings of minor-planet names: 179001–180000
