= EB-1 =

EB-1 or EB1 may refer to:

- EB-1 visa, a U.S. immigrant visa preference category
- Gibson EB-1, an electric bass guitar
- EB1, a Honda E engine
- Ford Falcon (EB) Series I, a car
- Higgins EB-1, an American helicopter
- Bazzocchi EB.1 Littore, a glider
- British Rail Class EB1, locomotives
- EB1 (end-binding 1), or MAPRE1, a protein
- (180537) 2004 EB1, a minor planet

== See also ==
- EBI (disambiguation)
- EB-2 (disambiguation)
- BZLF1, also known as Zta, EB1, a viral gene of the Epstein–Barr virus
