= EB-2 =

EB-2 or EB2 may refer to:

- EB-2 visa, a U.S. immigrant visa preference category
- Gibson EB-2, an electric bass guitar
- EB2, a Honda E engine
- EBII, the Ford Falcon (EB) Series II, a car
- Bazzocchi EB.2, a glider
- UR GC class, later known as the UR/KUR EB2 class, locomotives
- EB2, or MAPRE2, a protein
- Europa Barbarorum II, a PC game

== See also ==
- EB-1 (disambiguation)
