= UR GD class =

Uganda Railway GD class Kenya-Uganda Railway GD (EB3) class East African Railways 24 class
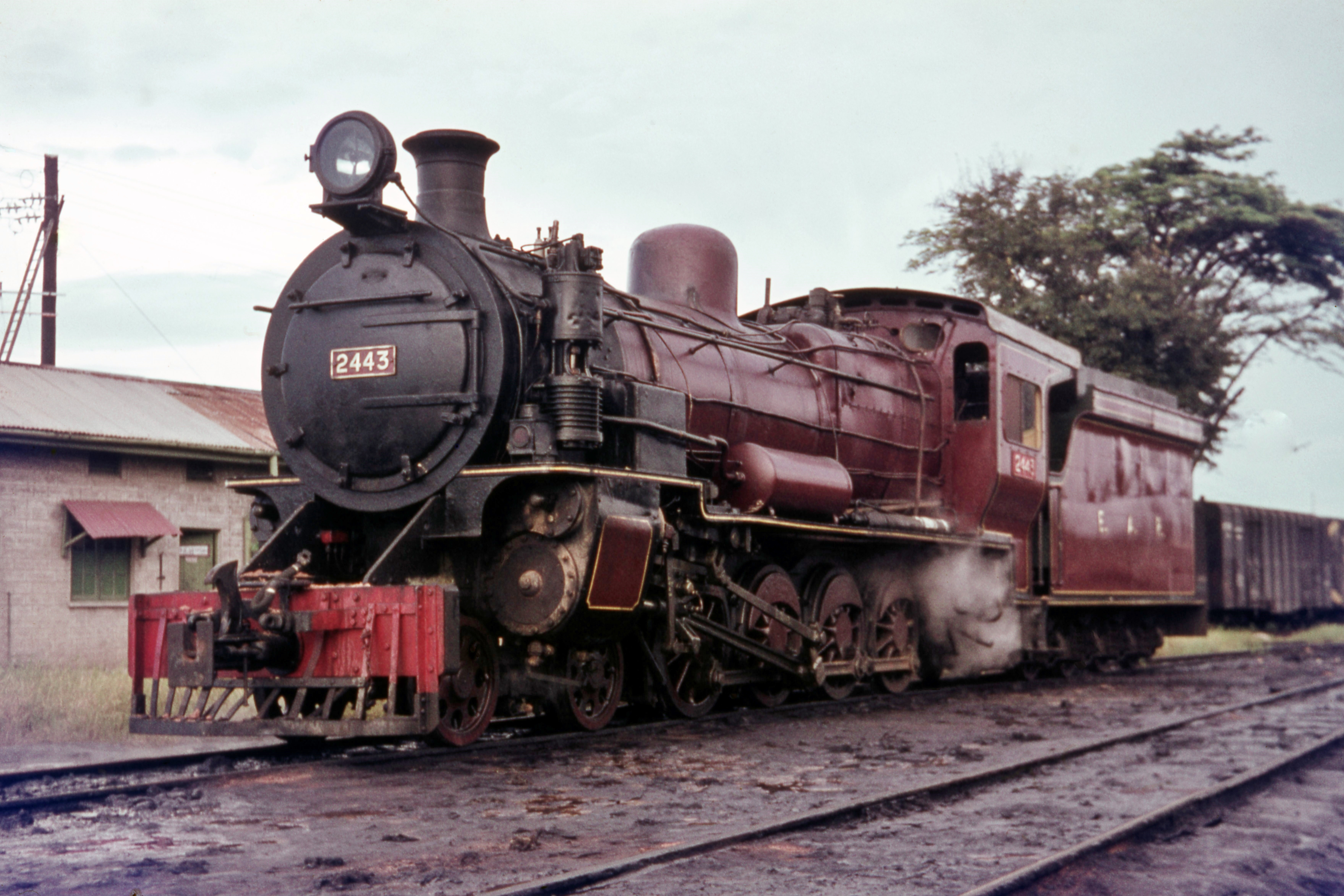
- No. 2443 at Tabora depot, Tanzania, in 1968
Type and origin
- Power type: Steam
- Builder: Vulcan Foundry; Nasmyth, Wilson and Company
- Build date: 1923–1930
- Total produced: 62
Specifications
- Configuration
  - Whyte: 4-8-0
- Gauge: 1,000 mm (3 ft 3 3/8 in)
Career
- Operators: Uganda Railway (UR); → Kenya-Uganda Railway (KUR); → East African Railways (EAR)
- Class: UR: GD class; KUR: GD class / EB3 class; EAR: 24 class
- Numbers: UR: 162–217; KUR: 162–223; EAR: 2401–2462

The UR GD class, known later as the UR / KUR EB3 class, and later still as the EAR 24 class, was a class of 1,000 mm (3 ft 3 3/8 in) gauge 4-8-0 steam locomotives built for the Uganda Railway (UR). It was a larger and modified version of the earlier, experimental, UR GC class.

== Service history ==
The first batch of GD class engines entered service on the UR in 1923. Heavier rail had been laid on the UR main line in preparation for their arrival. Further batches entered service progressively, including after the UR was renamed the Kenya-Uganda Railway (KUR) in 1926.

The class was the most numerous of all the KUR, and later East African Railways (EAR), classes in service, and became the maids of all work. Nearly 60 years after the class's introduction, the class was still in use on Kenya Railways (KR), one of the EAR's successors.

== See also ==
- History of rail transport in Tanzania
- Rail transport in Kenya
- Rail transport in Uganda
