= Bazzocchi EB.2 =

General information
- Type: Single seat glider
- National origin: Italy
- Designer: Ermanno Bazzocchi
- Number built: 1

History
- First flight: 1936

The Bazzocchi EB.2 was a one off, Italian single seat glider designed and built by a university student in 1936, his second design of the year.

== Design and development ==
Ermanno Bazzucchi was a nineteen-year-old student at the Polytechnic University of Milan when he designed and built his first aircraft, the EB.1 Littore, in 1936. The EB.2, a simpler and lower performance glider with a shorter span and straight edged tail surfaces followed it in the same year, built by students of Tradate Bishop College.

The EB.2 was a high wing braced monoplane. Each wing was built around a single spar; in plan they were unswept and of parallel chord, ending in blunted tips. Ailerons filled almost half the span. Centrally mounted above the fuselage on a pedestal with about 2° of dihedral, they were braced to the fuselage on each side by a single faired wooden strut which ran from just inside mid-span to the bottom of the fuselage.

The cross section of the EB.2's wooden fuselage was rhomboidal with its diagonals vertical and horizontal, defined by lattice work and fabric covered. Its open cockpit was immediately ahead of the wing, placing the pilot's head against the front of the central pedestal. There was a straight tapered fin and rudder; the latter extended a little below the keel, where it was protected by a small tail bumper. Its braced, blunt tipped and constant chord tailplane was set forward on top of the fuselage with the unbalanced elevator's trailing edge only just reaching the fin leading edge. A simple wooden skid served as the undercarriage.

== Specifications ==
Data from Pedrelli (2011) p.203

General characteristics

- Crew: One
- Length: 6.10 m (20 ft 0 in)
- Wingspan: 11.0 m (36 ft 1 in)
- Wing area: 15.00 m^{2} (161.5 sq ft)
- Aspect ratio: 8
- Empty weight: 115 kg (254 lb)
- Gross weight: 190 kg (419 lb)

Performance

- Maximum glide ratio: 12.3:1 estimated
- Wing loading: 12 kg/m^{2} (2.5 lb/sq ft)
