= UR GB class =

Uganda Railway GB class Kenya-Uganda Railway GB (EB1) class East African Railways 22 class (part)
Type and origin
- Power type: Steam
- Builder: North British Locomotive Company
- Build date: 1919
- Total produced: 34
Specifications
- Configuration
  - Whyte: 4-8-0
- Gauge: 1,000 mm (3 ft 3 3/8 in)
Career
- Operators: Uganda Railway (UR); → Kenya-Uganda Railway (KUR); → East African Railways (EAR)
- Class: UR: GB class; KUR: GB class / EB1 class; EAR: 22 class (part)
- Numbers: UR / KUR: 128–161; EAR: 2218–23
- Disposition: All scrapped

The UR GB class, known later as the UR / KUR EB1 class, and later still as part of the EAR 22 class, was a class of 1,000 mm (3 ft 3 3/8 in) gauge 4-8-0 steam locomotives built by North British Locomotive Company in Glasgow, Scotland, for the Uganda Railway (UR). Its design of GB was based upon that of the earlier UR G class.

The 34 members of the GB class entered service on the UR in 1919, and continued in service after the UR was renamed the Kenya-Uganda Railway (KUR) in 1926. Some of them were in service long enough to be also operated by the KUR's successor, the East African Railways (EAR) as part of its 22 class, from 1948 until the last ones were withdrawn in 1964.

== See also ==
- Rail transport in Kenya
- Rail transport in Uganda
