= Meanings of minor-planet names: 180001–181000 =

As minor planet discoveries are confirmed, they are given a permanent number by the IAU's Minor Planet Center (MPC), and the discoverers can then submit names for them, following the IAU's naming conventions. The list below concerns those minor planets in the specified number-range that have received names, and explains the meanings of those names.

Official naming citations of newly named small Solar System bodies are approved and published in a bulletin by IAU's Working Group for Small Bodies Nomenclature (WGSBN). Before May 2021, citations were published in MPC's Minor Planet Circulars for many decades. Recent citations can also be found on the JPL Small-Body Database (SBDB). Until his death in 2016, German astronomer Lutz D. Schmadel compiled these citations into the Dictionary of Minor Planet Names (DMP) and regularly updated the collection.

Based on Paul Herget's The Names of the Minor Planets, Schmadel also researched the unclear origin of numerous asteroids, most of which had been named prior to World War II. This article incorporates text from this source, which is in the public domain: SBDB New namings may only be added to this list below after official publication as the preannouncement of names is condemned. The WGSBN publishes a comprehensive guideline for the naming rules of non-cometary small Solar System bodies.

== 180001–180100 ==
Named minor planet	Provisional	This minor planet was named for...	Ref · Catalog
There are no named minor planets in this number range

== 180101–180200 ==
back to top

Named minor planet	Provisional	This minor planet was named for...	Ref · Catalog
180141 Sperauskas	2003 FA_{123}	Julius Sperauskas (born 1950), President of Lithuanian Astronomical Union (2003–2007), is a senior researcher at the Astronomical Observatory of Vilnius University (570).	JPL · 180141
180143 Gaberogers	2003 FE_{124}	Gabe D. Rogers (born 1973) is an assistant group supervisor at the Johns Hopkins University Applied Physics Laboratory, who served as the Spacecraft Systems Engineer for the New Horizons mission to Pluto.	JPL · 180143

== 180201–180300 ==
back to top

Named minor planet	Provisional	This minor planet was named for...	Ref · Catalog
There are no named minor planets in this number range

== 180301–180400 ==
back to top

Named minor planet	Provisional	This minor planet was named for...	Ref · Catalog
180367 VonFeldt	2003 YQ_{110}	Kevin Joseph VonFeldt (1983–2009), of Stafford, Texas, husband of Thanh, son of Randy and Mary and brother of Brian, was a licensed aircraft mechanic who loved family, baseball and motorcycles	JPL · 180367

== 180401–180500 ==
back to top

Named minor planet	Provisional	This minor planet was named for...	Ref · Catalog
There are no named minor planets in this number range

== 180501–180600 ==
back to top

Named minor planet	Provisional	This minor planet was named for...	Ref · Catalog
There are no named minor planets in this number range

== 180601–180700 ==
back to top

Named minor planet	Provisional	This minor planet was named for...	Ref · Catalog
180643 Cardoen	2004 GK_{20}	Dany Cardoen (born 1949), French amateur astronomer and optician	JPL · 180643

== 180701–180800 ==
back to top

Named minor planet	Provisional	This minor planet was named for...	Ref · Catalog
180739 Barbet	2004 KX_{7}	Alix Barbet (born 1940), French archaeologist and author, and Jean Barbet, French aeronautical engineer	JPL · 180739

== 180801–180900 ==
back to top

Named minor planet	Provisional	This minor planet was named for...	Ref · Catalog
180824 Kabos	2005 GU_{8}	Gyula Kabos (1887–1941), Hungarian actor and comedian	JPL · 180824
180855 Debrarose	2005 GO_{205}	Debra M. Rose (born 1959) is a Senior Program Manager for Research and Development at the Southwest Research Institute, and served as a Payload Instrument Sequencer for the New Horizons mission to Pluto.	JPL · 180855
180857 Hofigéza	2005 HG_{7}	Géza Hofi (1936–2002), an actor and comedian, had a strong influence on Hungarian cabaret	JPL · 180857

== 180901–181000 ==
back to top

Named minor planet	Provisional	This minor planet was named for...	Ref · Catalog
180932 Luciegreen	2005 LG_{31}	Lucinda (Lucie) Green, British physicist and science communicator.	IAU · 180932
180940 Bighornfire	2005 ML_{2}	All firefighting personnel and organizations who tirelessly fought and suppressed the Bighorn Fire, a wildfire which scorched 120 000 acres of forest in the Santa Catalina Mountains, Arizona in summer 2020. Their heroic efforts kept thousands of people safe, and saved the astronomical facilities located there.	IAU · 180940

back to top

Preceded by 179,001–180,000	Meanings of minor-planet names List of minor planets: 180,001–181,000	Succeeded by 181,001–182,000
