= UR GC class =

Uganda Railway GC class Kenya-Uganda Railway GC (EB2) class
Type and origin
- Power type: Steam
- Builder: Nasmyth, Wilson and Company
- Serial number: L 1350 – L 1351
- Build date: 1921
- Total produced: 2
Specifications
- Configuration
  - Whyte: 4-8-0
- Gauge: 1,000 mm (3 ft 3 3/8 in)
Career
- Operators: Uganda Railway (UR); → Kenya-Uganda Railway (KUR)
- Class: UR: GC class; KUR: GC class / EB2 class
- Numbers: 119–120
- Disposition: Both scrapped

The UR GC class, later known as the UR / KUR EB2 class, was a class of 1,000 mm (3 ft 3 3/8 in) gauge 4-8-0 steam locomotives built by Nasmyth, Wilson and Company in Patricroft, Salford, England, for the Uganda Railway (UR). Its design was very similar to that of the earlier UR G class and UR GB class, save that the two members of the GC class were equipped with piston valves and a Robinson superheater.

The GC class entered service on the UR in 1921, and continued in service after the UR was renamed the Kenya-Uganda Railway (KUR) in 1926. The two GC class locomotives were heavily worked as trial engines, and then written off in 1934 after proving the value of superheating. With the exception of the KUR ED1 class shunting engines, all further steam engines ordered by the KUR and its successor, the East African Railways (EAR), were superheated.

== See also ==
- Rail transport in Kenya
- Rail transport in Uganda
