= List of minor planets: 180001–181000 =

The following is a partial list of minor planets, running from minor-planet number 180001 through 181000, inclusive. The primary data for this and other partial lists is based on JPL's "Small-Body Orbital Elements" and data available from the Minor Planet Center. Critical list information is also provided by the MPC, unless otherwise specified from Lowell Observatory. A detailed description of the table's columns and additional sources are given on the main page including a complete list of every page in this series, and a statistical break-up on the dynamical classification of minor planets.

Also see the summary list of all named bodies in numerical and alphabetical order, and the corresponding naming citations for the number range of this particular list. New namings may only be added to this list after official publication, as the preannouncement of names is condemned by the Working Group for Small Bodies Nomenclature of the International Astronomical Union.

Near-Earth obj.	MBA (inner)	MBA (outer)	Centaur
Mars-crosser	MBA (middle)	Jupiter trojan	Trans-Neptunian obj.
Unclassified

== 180001–180100 ==
Designation			Discovery			Properties		Ref
Permanent	Provisional	Named after	Date	Site	Discoverer(s)	Category	Diam.	Ref
180001	2002 YZ	—	December 27, 2002	Anderson Mesa	LONEOS	·	3.2 km	MPC · JPL
180002	2002 YD_{4}	—	December 28, 2002	Anderson Mesa	LONEOS	·	2.2 km	MPC · JPL
180003	2002 YU_{5}	—	December 27, 2002	Anderson Mesa	LONEOS	DOR	4.9 km	MPC · JPL
180004	2002 YY_{8}	—	December 31, 2002	Socorro	LINEAR	·	2.9 km	MPC · JPL
180005	2002 YQ_{12}	—	December 31, 2002	Socorro	LINEAR	·	3.5 km	MPC · JPL
180006	2002 YQ_{13}	—	December 31, 2002	Socorro	LINEAR	·	2.9 km	MPC · JPL
180007	2002 YM_{14}	—	December 31, 2002	Socorro	LINEAR	·	2.0 km	MPC · JPL
180008	2002 YZ_{18}	—	December 31, 2002	Socorro	LINEAR	(5)	2.2 km	MPC · JPL
180009	2002 YY_{20}	—	December 31, 2002	Socorro	LINEAR	·	2.3 km	MPC · JPL
180010	2002 YR_{22}	—	December 31, 2002	Socorro	LINEAR	EOS	3.5 km	MPC · JPL
180011	2002 YO_{25}	—	December 31, 2002	Socorro	LINEAR	·	1.9 km	MPC · JPL
180012	2002 YM_{26}	—	December 31, 2002	Socorro	LINEAR	·	2.6 km	MPC · JPL
180013	2002 YV_{26}	—	December 31, 2002	Socorro	LINEAR	·	5.3 km	MPC · JPL
180014	2002 YP_{32}	—	December 27, 2002	Palomar	NEAT	(5)	1.8 km	MPC · JPL
180015	2003 AH_{1}	—	January 1, 2003	Socorro	LINEAR	JUN	2.0 km	MPC · JPL
180016	2003 AW_{1}	—	January 2, 2003	Socorro	LINEAR	·	3.9 km	MPC · JPL
180017	2003 AJ_{2}	—	January 2, 2003	Socorro	LINEAR	·	4.7 km	MPC · JPL
180018	2003 AU_{8}	—	January 3, 2003	Socorro	LINEAR	·	4.8 km	MPC · JPL
180019	2003 AR_{10}	—	January 1, 2003	Socorro	LINEAR	·	3.5 km	MPC · JPL
180020	2003 AO_{12}	—	January 1, 2003	Socorro	LINEAR	·	3.3 km	MPC · JPL
180021	2003 AP_{14}	—	January 2, 2003	Socorro	LINEAR	·	2.1 km	MPC · JPL
180022	2003 AD_{16}	—	January 4, 2003	Socorro	LINEAR	·	2.0 km	MPC · JPL
180023	2003 AU_{16}	—	January 5, 2003	Anderson Mesa	LONEOS	H	1.0 km	MPC · JPL
180024	2003 AO_{17}	—	January 4, 2003	Socorro	LINEAR	·	2.9 km	MPC · JPL
180025	2003 AU_{20}	—	January 5, 2003	Socorro	LINEAR	·	2.3 km	MPC · JPL
180026	2003 AD_{22}	—	January 5, 2003	Socorro	LINEAR	ADE	4.4 km	MPC · JPL
180027	2003 AY_{24}	—	January 4, 2003	Socorro	LINEAR	·	2.5 km	MPC · JPL
180028	2003 AM_{33}	—	January 5, 2003	Socorro	LINEAR	·	2.9 km	MPC · JPL
180029	2003 AS_{37}	—	January 7, 2003	Socorro	LINEAR	·	1.6 km	MPC · JPL
180030	2003 AM_{39}	—	January 7, 2003	Socorro	LINEAR	·	3.0 km	MPC · JPL
180031	2003 AR_{43}	—	January 5, 2003	Socorro	LINEAR	MRX	1.8 km	MPC · JPL
180032	2003 AU_{44}	—	January 5, 2003	Socorro	LINEAR	·	5.6 km	MPC · JPL
180033	2003 AV_{48}	—	January 5, 2003	Socorro	LINEAR	·	2.8 km	MPC · JPL
180034	2003 AH_{52}	—	January 5, 2003	Socorro	LINEAR	·	3.3 km	MPC · JPL
180035	2003 AG_{60}	—	January 5, 2003	Socorro	LINEAR	·	3.5 km	MPC · JPL
180036	2003 AD_{63}	—	January 8, 2003	Socorro	LINEAR	·	2.1 km	MPC · JPL
180037	2003 AD_{65}	—	January 7, 2003	Socorro	LINEAR	·	2.8 km	MPC · JPL
180038	2003 AO_{66}	—	January 7, 2003	Socorro	LINEAR	·	2.6 km	MPC · JPL
180039	2003 AR_{67}	—	January 8, 2003	Socorro	LINEAR	·	2.9 km	MPC · JPL
180040	2003 AX_{72}	—	January 10, 2003	Socorro	LINEAR	·	2.6 km	MPC · JPL
180041	2003 AY_{72}	—	January 10, 2003	Socorro	LINEAR	·	4.7 km	MPC · JPL
180042	2003 AQ_{75}	—	January 10, 2003	Socorro	LINEAR	·	4.0 km	MPC · JPL
180043	2003 AF_{77}	—	January 10, 2003	Socorro	LINEAR	·	2.9 km	MPC · JPL
180044	2003 AJ_{88}	—	January 2, 2003	Socorro	LINEAR	·	3.8 km	MPC · JPL
180045	2003 AR_{91}	—	January 5, 2003	Anderson Mesa	LONEOS	·	4.6 km	MPC · JPL
180046	2003 BB_{5}	—	January 24, 2003	La Silla	A. Boattini, H. Scholl	·	2.8 km	MPC · JPL
180047	2003 BM_{9}	—	January 26, 2003	Palomar	NEAT	·	3.0 km	MPC · JPL
180048	2003 BH_{10}	—	January 26, 2003	Palomar	NEAT	·	3.4 km	MPC · JPL
180049	2003 BN_{14}	—	January 26, 2003	Haleakala	NEAT	EUN	2.3 km	MPC · JPL
180050	2003 BR_{21}	—	January 27, 2003	Socorro	LINEAR	H	880 m	MPC · JPL
180051	2003 BJ_{22}	—	January 25, 2003	Palomar	NEAT	EUN	1.8 km	MPC · JPL
180052	2003 BU_{23}	—	January 25, 2003	Palomar	NEAT	·	3.1 km	MPC · JPL
180053	2003 BU_{25}	—	January 26, 2003	Palomar	NEAT	·	3.6 km	MPC · JPL
180054	2003 BY_{30}	—	January 27, 2003	Socorro	LINEAR	·	3.3 km	MPC · JPL
180055	2003 BR_{32}	—	January 27, 2003	Kitt Peak	Spacewatch	·	2.8 km	MPC · JPL
180056	2003 BO_{39}	—	January 27, 2003	Socorro	LINEAR	·	3.7 km	MPC · JPL
180057	2003 BU_{45}	—	January 30, 2003	Palomar	NEAT	·	2.3 km	MPC · JPL
180058	2003 BM_{50}	—	January 27, 2003	Socorro	LINEAR	·	3.2 km	MPC · JPL
180059	2003 BL_{65}	—	January 30, 2003	Anderson Mesa	LONEOS	·	2.7 km	MPC · JPL
180060	2003 BV_{65}	—	January 30, 2003	Socorro	LINEAR	GEF ·	5.3 km	MPC · JPL
180061	2003 BG_{66}	—	January 30, 2003	Anderson Mesa	LONEOS	LIX	6.9 km	MPC · JPL
180062	2003 BT_{71}	—	January 28, 2003	Socorro	LINEAR	GEF	4.7 km	MPC · JPL
180063	2003 BC_{76}	—	January 29, 2003	Palomar	NEAT	DOR	4.7 km	MPC · JPL
180064	2003 BP_{78}	—	January 31, 2003	Socorro	LINEAR	·	3.6 km	MPC · JPL
180065	2003 BF_{79}	—	January 31, 2003	Anderson Mesa	LONEOS	·	3.3 km	MPC · JPL
180066	2003 BN_{79}	—	January 31, 2003	Anderson Mesa	LONEOS	·	2.9 km	MPC · JPL
180067	2003 BY_{80}	—	January 30, 2003	Anderson Mesa	LONEOS	·	2.7 km	MPC · JPL
180068	2003 BK_{82}	—	January 31, 2003	Socorro	LINEAR	RAF	1.7 km	MPC · JPL
180069	2003 BW_{82}	—	January 31, 2003	Socorro	LINEAR	·	3.4 km	MPC · JPL
180070	2003 BU_{90}	—	January 31, 2003	Socorro	LINEAR	·	5.0 km	MPC · JPL
180071	2003 BH_{92}	—	January 26, 2003	Anderson Mesa	LONEOS	·	5.6 km	MPC · JPL
180072	2003 CS_{2}	—	February 2, 2003	Socorro	LINEAR	·	4.4 km	MPC · JPL
180073	2003 CX_{2}	—	February 2, 2003	Socorro	LINEAR	GEF	2.1 km	MPC · JPL
180074	2003 CB_{4}	—	February 1, 2003	Socorro	LINEAR	EUN	3.0 km	MPC · JPL
180075	2003 CM_{12}	—	February 2, 2003	Palomar	NEAT	·	3.0 km	MPC · JPL
180076	2003 CO_{12}	—	February 2, 2003	Palomar	NEAT	·	3.1 km	MPC · JPL
180077	2003 CZ_{21}	—	February 3, 2003	Goodricke-Pigott	Kessel, J. W.	·	2.8 km	MPC · JPL
180078	2003 CG_{25}	—	February 5, 2003	Haleakala	NEAT	·	5.9 km	MPC · JPL
180079	2003 DU_{2}	—	February 22, 2003	Desert Eagle	W. K. Y. Yeung	·	4.0 km	MPC · JPL
180080	2003 DZ_{10}	—	February 26, 2003	Socorro	LINEAR	T_{j} (2.99)	5.8 km	MPC · JPL
180081	2003 DA_{11}	—	February 23, 2003	Kitt Peak	Spacewatch	·	2.6 km	MPC · JPL
180082	2003 DZ_{11}	—	February 25, 2003	Campo Imperatore	CINEOS	AGN	1.9 km	MPC · JPL
180083	2003 DT_{19}	—	February 22, 2003	Palomar	NEAT	·	3.0 km	MPC · JPL
180084	2003 DV_{24}	—	February 23, 2003	Kitt Peak	Spacewatch	·	4.6 km	MPC · JPL
180085	2003 EW_{1}	—	March 3, 2003	Palomar	NEAT	EOS	3.3 km	MPC · JPL
180086	2003 EE_{4}	—	March 6, 2003	Socorro	LINEAR	H	1.2 km	MPC · JPL
180087	2003 EL_{8}	—	March 6, 2003	Anderson Mesa	LONEOS	GEF	2.4 km	MPC · JPL
180088	2003 EQ_{27}	—	March 6, 2003	Socorro	LINEAR	·	4.2 km	MPC · JPL
180089	2003 ER_{27}	—	March 6, 2003	Socorro	LINEAR	·	3.4 km	MPC · JPL
180090	2003 EX_{28}	—	March 6, 2003	Socorro	LINEAR	·	5.2 km	MPC · JPL
180091	2003 ED_{32}	—	March 7, 2003	Socorro	LINEAR	·	2.3 km	MPC · JPL
180092	2003 EC_{36}	—	March 7, 2003	Anderson Mesa	LONEOS	·	3.4 km	MPC · JPL
180093	2003 EJ_{41}	—	March 9, 2003	Kitt Peak	Spacewatch	EOS	2.4 km	MPC · JPL
180094	2003 EA_{42}	—	March 7, 2003	Anderson Mesa	LONEOS	EOS	2.6 km	MPC · JPL
180095	2003 EA_{46}	—	March 7, 2003	Socorro	LINEAR	T_{j} (2.99)	8.0 km	MPC · JPL
180096	2003 EH_{49}	—	March 10, 2003	Anderson Mesa	LONEOS	·	3.4 km	MPC · JPL
180097	2003 EF_{53}	—	March 8, 2003	Palomar	NEAT	·	3.4 km	MPC · JPL
180098	2003 EF_{60}	—	March 6, 2003	Goodricke-Pigott	R. A. Tucker	·	3.5 km	MPC · JPL
180099	2003 EY_{62}	—	March 10, 2003	Campo Imperatore	CINEOS	THM	4.4 km	MPC · JPL
180100	2003 FT_{2}	—	March 23, 2003	Palomar	NEAT	·	5.8 km	MPC · JPL

== 180101–180200 ==
back to top

Designation			Discovery			Properties		Ref
Permanent	Provisional	Named after	Date	Site	Discoverer(s)	Category	Diam.	Ref
180101	2003 FB_{3}	—	March 24, 2003	Socorro	LINEAR	H	750 m	MPC · JPL
180102	2003 FN_{3}	—	March 24, 2003	Socorro	LINEAR	H	860 m	MPC · JPL
180103	2003 FX_{6}	—	March 26, 2003	Wrightwood	J. W. Young	·	5.9 km	MPC · JPL
180104	2003 FN_{11}	—	March 23, 2003	Kitt Peak	Spacewatch	·	2.3 km	MPC · JPL
180105	2003 FB_{12}	—	March 24, 2003	Kitt Peak	Spacewatch	·	2.6 km	MPC · JPL
180106	2003 FB_{19}	—	March 24, 2003	Haleakala	NEAT	·	3.9 km	MPC · JPL
180107	2003 FH_{22}	—	March 25, 2003	Catalina	CSS	·	4.3 km	MPC · JPL
180108	2003 FU_{23}	—	March 23, 2003	Kitt Peak	Spacewatch	EOS	2.9 km	MPC · JPL
180109	2003 FT_{26}	—	March 24, 2003	Kitt Peak	Spacewatch	THM	3.3 km	MPC · JPL
180110	2003 FP_{27}	—	March 24, 2003	Kitt Peak	Spacewatch	KOR	2.0 km	MPC · JPL
180111	2003 FB_{28}	—	March 24, 2003	Kitt Peak	Spacewatch	·	3.4 km	MPC · JPL
180112	2003 FW_{28}	—	March 24, 2003	Haleakala	NEAT	EOS	3.8 km	MPC · JPL
180113	2003 FN_{31}	—	March 23, 2003	Kitt Peak	Spacewatch	EOS	2.9 km	MPC · JPL
180114	2003 FN_{34}	—	March 23, 2003	Kitt Peak	Spacewatch	·	2.8 km	MPC · JPL
180115	2003 FC_{40}	—	March 24, 2003	Kitt Peak	Spacewatch	·	4.1 km	MPC · JPL
180116	2003 FG_{44}	—	March 23, 2003	Kitt Peak	Spacewatch	·	3.8 km	MPC · JPL
180117	2003 FW_{46}	—	March 24, 2003	Kitt Peak	Spacewatch	·	2.2 km	MPC · JPL
180118	2003 FN_{48}	—	March 24, 2003	Kitt Peak	Spacewatch	·	3.1 km	MPC · JPL
180119	2003 FA_{49}	—	March 24, 2003	Kitt Peak	Spacewatch	·	3.3 km	MPC · JPL
180120	2003 FD_{50}	—	March 24, 2003	Haleakala	NEAT	·	5.0 km	MPC · JPL
180121	2003 FZ_{52}	—	March 25, 2003	Palomar	NEAT	·	4.5 km	MPC · JPL
180122	2003 FL_{53}	—	March 25, 2003	Palomar	NEAT	·	3.6 km	MPC · JPL
180123	2003 FQ_{53}	—	March 25, 2003	Palomar	NEAT	·	4.3 km	MPC · JPL
180124	2003 FQ_{60}	—	March 26, 2003	Palomar	NEAT	·	4.0 km	MPC · JPL
180125	2003 FH_{63}	—	March 26, 2003	Palomar	NEAT	·	5.3 km	MPC · JPL
180126	2003 FC_{65}	—	March 26, 2003	Palomar	NEAT	·	4.2 km	MPC · JPL
180127	2003 FF_{68}	—	March 26, 2003	Palomar	NEAT	·	5.2 km	MPC · JPL
180128	2003 FM_{68}	—	March 26, 2003	Palomar	NEAT	·	4.9 km	MPC · JPL
180129	2003 FF_{71}	—	March 26, 2003	Kitt Peak	Spacewatch	·	3.8 km	MPC · JPL
180130	2003 FK_{74}	—	March 26, 2003	Haleakala	NEAT	·	6.5 km	MPC · JPL
180131	2003 FX_{74}	—	March 26, 2003	Palomar	NEAT	·	6.6 km	MPC · JPL
180132	2003 FL_{86}	—	March 28, 2003	Kitt Peak	Spacewatch	·	3.8 km	MPC · JPL
180133	2003 FM_{86}	—	March 28, 2003	Kitt Peak	Spacewatch	·	5.6 km	MPC · JPL
180134	2003 FE_{89}	—	March 29, 2003	Anderson Mesa	LONEOS	·	6.0 km	MPC · JPL
180135	2003 FV_{89}	—	March 29, 2003	Anderson Mesa	LONEOS	·	4.0 km	MPC · JPL
180136	2003 FX_{102}	—	March 26, 2003	Powell	Glaze, M.	·	4.7 km	MPC · JPL
180137	2003 FD_{103}	—	March 24, 2003	Kitt Peak	Spacewatch	·	4.3 km	MPC · JPL
180138	2003 FE_{103}	—	March 24, 2003	Kitt Peak	Spacewatch	·	3.4 km	MPC · JPL
180139	2003 FB_{108}	—	March 31, 2003	Kitt Peak	Spacewatch	·	6.5 km	MPC · JPL
180140	2003 FE_{117}	—	March 24, 2003	Kitt Peak	Spacewatch	TIR	5.3 km	MPC · JPL
180141 Sperauskas	2003 FA_{123}	Sperauskas	March 26, 2003	Moletai	K. Černis, Zdanavicius, J.	·	3.1 km	MPC · JPL
180142	2003 FH_{123}	—	March 27, 2003	Kitt Peak	Spacewatch	KOR	1.7 km	MPC · JPL
180143 Gaberogers	2003 FE_{124}	Gaberogers	March 30, 2003	Kitt Peak	M. W. Buie	THM	4.8 km	MPC · JPL
180144	2003 GV_{5}	—	April 1, 2003	Socorro	LINEAR	·	4.6 km	MPC · JPL
180145	2003 GU_{7}	—	April 2, 2003	Socorro	LINEAR	·	5.7 km	MPC · JPL
180146	2003 GL_{8}	—	April 3, 2003	Anderson Mesa	LONEOS	KOR	2.3 km	MPC · JPL
180147	2003 GL_{9}	—	April 2, 2003	Socorro	LINEAR	·	4.6 km	MPC · JPL
180148	2003 GB_{14}	—	April 4, 2003	Anderson Mesa	LONEOS	·	4.5 km	MPC · JPL
180149	2003 GK_{15}	—	April 3, 2003	Anderson Mesa	LONEOS	·	4.2 km	MPC · JPL
180150	2003 GQ_{16}	—	April 3, 2003	Haleakala	NEAT	·	7.2 km	MPC · JPL
180151	2003 GS_{16}	—	April 4, 2003	Kitt Peak	Spacewatch	·	3.1 km	MPC · JPL
180152	2003 GK_{22}	—	April 6, 2003	Desert Eagle	W. K. Y. Yeung	·	5.6 km	MPC · JPL
180153	2003 GK_{25}	—	April 4, 2003	Kitt Peak	Spacewatch	·	4.4 km	MPC · JPL
180154	2003 GN_{31}	—	April 8, 2003	Kitt Peak	Spacewatch	·	2.7 km	MPC · JPL
180155	2003 GF_{38}	—	April 8, 2003	Socorro	LINEAR	EOS	2.8 km	MPC · JPL
180156	2003 GJ_{39}	—	April 9, 2003	Kitt Peak	Spacewatch	EOS	2.8 km	MPC · JPL
180157	2003 GU_{50}	—	April 8, 2003	Haleakala	NEAT	·	4.5 km	MPC · JPL
180158	2003 GT_{53}	—	April 3, 2003	Anderson Mesa	LONEOS	·	5.1 km	MPC · JPL
180159	2003 GE_{54}	—	April 3, 2003	Anderson Mesa	LONEOS	·	2.9 km	MPC · JPL
180160	2003 GR_{54}	—	April 3, 2003	Anderson Mesa	LONEOS	·	3.0 km	MPC · JPL
180161	2003 GU_{55}	—	April 11, 2003	Kitt Peak	Spacewatch	·	4.6 km	MPC · JPL
180162	2003 HM_{2}	—	April 25, 2003	Socorro	LINEAR	H	790 m	MPC · JPL
180163	2003 HZ_{2}	—	April 24, 2003	Kitt Peak	Spacewatch	·	4.1 km	MPC · JPL
180164	2003 HP_{6}	—	April 25, 2003	Kitt Peak	Spacewatch	·	3.7 km	MPC · JPL
180165	2003 HX_{6}	—	April 24, 2003	Kitt Peak	Spacewatch	EOS	2.6 km	MPC · JPL
180166	2003 HN_{10}	—	April 25, 2003	Anderson Mesa	LONEOS	·	6.1 km	MPC · JPL
180167	2003 HP_{10}	—	April 25, 2003	Kitt Peak	Spacewatch	·	4.2 km	MPC · JPL
180168	2003 HJ_{15}	—	April 26, 2003	Haleakala	NEAT	·	4.1 km	MPC · JPL
180169	2003 HU_{15}	—	April 26, 2003	Socorro	LINEAR	H	1.1 km	MPC · JPL
180170	2003 HE_{23}	—	April 26, 2003	Haleakala	NEAT	LIX	6.0 km	MPC · JPL
180171	2003 HD_{31}	—	April 26, 2003	Kitt Peak	Spacewatch	·	5.5 km	MPC · JPL
180172	2003 HX_{32}	—	April 29, 2003	Socorro	LINEAR	H	960 m	MPC · JPL
180173	2003 HU_{40}	—	April 29, 2003	Socorro	LINEAR	EOS	3.9 km	MPC · JPL
180174	2003 HN_{42}	—	April 28, 2003	Socorro	LINEAR	·	4.5 km	MPC · JPL
180175	2003 HK_{45}	—	April 29, 2003	Socorro	LINEAR	·	3.6 km	MPC · JPL
180176	2003 HP_{54}	—	April 24, 2003	Anderson Mesa	LONEOS	THM	4.5 km	MPC · JPL
180177	2003 JR_{1}	—	May 1, 2003	Socorro	LINEAR	·	3.5 km	MPC · JPL
180178	2003 JU_{2}	—	May 1, 2003	Kitt Peak	Spacewatch	EUP	6.9 km	MPC · JPL
180179	2003 JM_{8}	—	May 2, 2003	Socorro	LINEAR	·	4.8 km	MPC · JPL
180180	2003 JC_{18}	—	May 9, 2003	Socorro	LINEAR	·	4.3 km	MPC · JPL
180181	2003 KD_{12}	—	May 27, 2003	Anderson Mesa	LONEOS	·	5.3 km	MPC · JPL
180182	2003 LF_{4}	—	June 3, 2003	Socorro	LINEAR	·	7.0 km	MPC · JPL
180183	2003 MC	—	June 21, 2003	Socorro	LINEAR	H	940 m	MPC · JPL
180184	2003 ML_{5}	—	June 26, 2003	Socorro	LINEAR	·	5.1 km	MPC · JPL
180185	2003 OO_{11}	—	July 20, 2003	Palomar	NEAT	H	970 m	MPC · JPL
180186	2003 QZ_{30}	—	August 25, 2003	Socorro	LINEAR	APO +1km · PHA	1.1 km	MPC · JPL
180187	2003 QA_{32}	—	August 21, 2003	Palomar	NEAT	·	930 m	MPC · JPL
180188	2003 QX_{67}	—	August 25, 2003	Palomar	NEAT	·	1.6 km	MPC · JPL
180189	2003 QN_{72}	—	August 23, 2003	Socorro	LINEAR	·	1.7 km	MPC · JPL
180190	2003 QH_{79}	—	August 25, 2003	Palomar	NEAT	·	2.1 km	MPC · JPL
180191	2003 SZ_{50}	—	September 18, 2003	Palomar	NEAT	·	900 m	MPC · JPL
180192	2003 SC_{53}	—	September 19, 2003	Palomar	NEAT	PHO	1.7 km	MPC · JPL
180193	2003 SX_{56}	—	September 16, 2003	Kitt Peak	Spacewatch	·	890 m	MPC · JPL
180194	2003 SK_{101}	—	September 20, 2003	Palomar	NEAT	·	2.1 km	MPC · JPL
180195	2003 SF_{110}	—	September 20, 2003	Palomar	NEAT	·	1.3 km	MPC · JPL
180196	2003 SL_{110}	—	September 20, 2003	Palomar	NEAT	·	1.1 km	MPC · JPL
180197	2003 SB_{192}	—	September 19, 2003	Palomar	NEAT	·	1.1 km	MPC · JPL
180198	2003 SU_{215}	—	September 24, 2003	Haleakala	NEAT	·	1.1 km	MPC · JPL
180199	2003 SK_{217}	—	September 27, 2003	Desert Eagle	W. K. Y. Yeung	·	1.3 km	MPC · JPL
180200	2003 SC_{250}	—	September 26, 2003	Socorro	LINEAR	·	1.2 km	MPC · JPL

== 180201–180300 ==
back to top

Designation			Discovery			Properties		Ref
Permanent	Provisional	Named after	Date	Site	Discoverer(s)	Category	Diam.	Ref
180201	2003 ST_{251}	—	September 26, 2003	Socorro	LINEAR	·	1.4 km	MPC · JPL
180202	2003 SO_{258}	—	September 28, 2003	Kitt Peak	Spacewatch	·	850 m	MPC · JPL
180203	2003 SU_{259}	—	September 28, 2003	Kitt Peak	Spacewatch	·	900 m	MPC · JPL
180204	2003 SB_{295}	—	September 28, 2003	Socorro	LINEAR	·	2.0 km	MPC · JPL
180205	2003 SD_{295}	—	September 28, 2003	Socorro	LINEAR	·	1.2 km	MPC · JPL
180206	2003 SH_{298}	—	September 18, 2003	Haleakala	NEAT	·	1.1 km	MPC · JPL
180207	2003 SH_{305}	—	September 17, 2003	Palomar	NEAT	·	1.1 km	MPC · JPL
180208	2003 SD_{311}	—	September 29, 2003	Socorro	LINEAR	·	960 m	MPC · JPL
180209	2003 SF_{312}	—	September 30, 2003	Kitt Peak	Spacewatch	·	860 m	MPC · JPL
180210	2003 SP_{318}	—	September 18, 2003	Socorro	LINEAR	·	1.3 km	MPC · JPL
180211	2003 TE_{5}	—	October 2, 2003	Kitt Peak	Spacewatch	(2076)	1.4 km	MPC · JPL
180212	2003 UE_{1}	—	October 16, 2003	Palomar	NEAT	·	1.1 km	MPC · JPL
180213	2003 UM_{8}	—	October 19, 2003	Wrightwood	J. W. Young	·	1.8 km	MPC · JPL
180214	2003 UB_{9}	—	October 17, 2003	Socorro	LINEAR	PHO	1.7 km	MPC · JPL
180215	2003 UK_{9}	—	October 16, 2003	Kitt Peak	Spacewatch	V	900 m	MPC · JPL
180216	2003 UY_{9}	—	October 20, 2003	Wrightwood	J. W. Young	·	950 m	MPC · JPL
180217	2003 UL_{23}	—	October 22, 2003	Kitt Peak	Spacewatch	·	1 km	MPC · JPL
180218	2003 UB_{29}	—	October 22, 2003	Kvistaberg	Uppsala-DLR Asteroid Survey	·	970 m	MPC · JPL
180219	2003 UX_{39}	—	October 16, 2003	Kitt Peak	Spacewatch	·	1.0 km	MPC · JPL
180220	2003 UG_{44}	—	October 18, 2003	Kitt Peak	Spacewatch	·	1.5 km	MPC · JPL
180221	2003 UR_{55}	—	October 18, 2003	Palomar	NEAT	·	1.1 km	MPC · JPL
180222	2003 UA_{98}	—	October 19, 2003	Anderson Mesa	LONEOS	V	990 m	MPC · JPL
180223	2003 UD_{107}	—	October 19, 2003	Kitt Peak	Spacewatch	·	920 m	MPC · JPL
180224	2003 UO_{123}	—	October 19, 2003	Kitt Peak	Spacewatch	·	990 m	MPC · JPL
180225	2003 UG_{127}	—	October 21, 2003	Kitt Peak	Spacewatch	·	1.2 km	MPC · JPL
180226	2003 UM_{130}	—	October 18, 2003	Palomar	NEAT	·	2.7 km	MPC · JPL
180227	2003 UN_{131}	—	October 19, 2003	Palomar	NEAT	V	920 m	MPC · JPL
180228	2003 UQ_{135}	—	October 21, 2003	Palomar	NEAT	·	1.0 km	MPC · JPL
180229	2003 UZ_{143}	—	October 18, 2003	Anderson Mesa	LONEOS	·	1.1 km	MPC · JPL
180230	2003 UW_{147}	—	October 18, 2003	Palomar	NEAT	·	2.3 km	MPC · JPL
180231	2003 UD_{149}	—	October 19, 2003	Haleakala	NEAT	V	970 m	MPC · JPL
180232	2003 UJ_{180}	—	October 21, 2003	Socorro	LINEAR	·	1.2 km	MPC · JPL
180233	2003 UU_{192}	—	October 30, 2003	Socorro	LINEAR	·	1.2 km	MPC · JPL
180234	2003 UY_{195}	—	October 20, 2003	Kitt Peak	Spacewatch	·	2.0 km	MPC · JPL
180235	2003 UF_{196}	—	October 21, 2003	Kitt Peak	Spacewatch	·	970 m	MPC · JPL
180236	2003 UG_{199}	—	October 21, 2003	Socorro	LINEAR	·	1.3 km	MPC · JPL
180237	2003 UT_{224}	—	October 22, 2003	Kitt Peak	Spacewatch	·	860 m	MPC · JPL
180238	2003 UP_{225}	—	October 22, 2003	Socorro	LINEAR	·	1.7 km	MPC · JPL
180239	2003 UY_{226}	—	October 23, 2003	Kitt Peak	Spacewatch	·	900 m	MPC · JPL
180240	2003 UB_{244}	—	October 24, 2003	Socorro	LINEAR	·	980 m	MPC · JPL
180241	2003 UC_{247}	—	October 24, 2003	Socorro	LINEAR	·	940 m	MPC · JPL
180242	2003 UE_{247}	—	October 24, 2003	Socorro	LINEAR	·	2.2 km	MPC · JPL
180243	2003 UQ_{252}	—	October 26, 2003	Kitt Peak	Spacewatch	·	870 m	MPC · JPL
180244	2003 UN_{254}	—	October 24, 2003	Kitt Peak	Spacewatch	·	900 m	MPC · JPL
180245	2003 UN_{259}	—	October 25, 2003	Socorro	LINEAR	NYS	1.6 km	MPC · JPL
180246	2003 UO_{261}	—	October 26, 2003	Kitt Peak	Spacewatch	·	890 m	MPC · JPL
180247	2003 UY_{263}	—	October 27, 2003	Kitt Peak	Spacewatch	·	1.1 km	MPC · JPL
180248	2003 UX_{265}	—	October 27, 2003	Kitt Peak	Spacewatch	NYS	1.8 km	MPC · JPL
180249	2003 UH_{274}	—	October 30, 2003	Socorro	LINEAR	·	1.1 km	MPC · JPL
180250	2003 UG_{281}	—	October 28, 2003	Socorro	LINEAR	·	1.1 km	MPC · JPL
180251	2003 UM_{283}	—	October 30, 2003	Socorro	LINEAR	·	1.3 km	MPC · JPL
180252	2003 UU_{283}	—	October 30, 2003	Socorro	LINEAR	·	970 m	MPC · JPL
180253	2003 UO_{314}	—	October 24, 2003	Kitt Peak	Spacewatch	·	890 m	MPC · JPL
180254	2003 VY_{1}	—	November 2, 2003	Socorro	LINEAR	·	1.0 km	MPC · JPL
180255	2003 VM_{9}	—	November 15, 2003	Palomar	NEAT	(1338) (FLO)	880 m	MPC · JPL
180256	2003 VE_{10}	—	November 15, 2003	Palomar	NEAT	·	1.4 km	MPC · JPL
180257	2003 WM_{3}	—	November 16, 2003	Catalina	CSS	·	1.1 km	MPC · JPL
180258	2003 WT_{5}	—	November 18, 2003	Palomar	NEAT	·	1.1 km	MPC · JPL
180259	2003 WN_{8}	—	November 16, 2003	Kitt Peak	Spacewatch	·	1.1 km	MPC · JPL
180260	2003 WG_{12}	—	November 18, 2003	Palomar	NEAT	·	890 m	MPC · JPL
180261	2003 WA_{15}	—	November 16, 2003	Kitt Peak	Spacewatch	·	860 m	MPC · JPL
180262	2003 WH_{18}	—	November 19, 2003	Socorro	LINEAR	·	1.0 km	MPC · JPL
180263	2003 WR_{19}	—	November 19, 2003	Socorro	LINEAR	·	1.1 km	MPC · JPL
180264	2003 WK_{24}	—	November 19, 2003	Kitt Peak	Spacewatch	·	1.7 km	MPC · JPL
180265	2003 WC_{27}	—	November 16, 2003	Kitt Peak	Spacewatch	L5	10 km	MPC · JPL
180266	2003 WQ_{34}	—	November 19, 2003	Kitt Peak	Spacewatch	·	1.5 km	MPC · JPL
180267	2003 WG_{36}	—	November 19, 2003	Kitt Peak	Spacewatch	·	930 m	MPC · JPL
180268	2003 WH_{38}	—	November 19, 2003	Socorro	LINEAR	V	990 m	MPC · JPL
180269	2003 WB_{41}	—	November 19, 2003	Kitt Peak	Spacewatch	·	1.1 km	MPC · JPL
180270	2003 WY_{45}	—	November 20, 2003	Socorro	LINEAR	·	980 m	MPC · JPL
180271	2003 WZ_{49}	—	November 19, 2003	Socorro	LINEAR	·	910 m	MPC · JPL
180272	2003 WD_{58}	—	November 18, 2003	Kitt Peak	Spacewatch	·	990 m	MPC · JPL
180273	2003 WH_{60}	—	November 18, 2003	Palomar	NEAT	V	1.0 km	MPC · JPL
180274	2003 WC_{63}	—	November 19, 2003	Kitt Peak	Spacewatch	L5	20 km	MPC · JPL
180275	2003 WV_{63}	—	November 19, 2003	Kitt Peak	Spacewatch	·	1.2 km	MPC · JPL
180276	2003 WU_{64}	—	November 19, 2003	Socorro	LINEAR	·	1.2 km	MPC · JPL
180277	2003 WY_{65}	—	November 19, 2003	Kitt Peak	Spacewatch	·	960 m	MPC · JPL
180278	2003 WS_{70}	—	November 20, 2003	Palomar	NEAT	·	2.6 km	MPC · JPL
180279	2003 WX_{72}	—	November 20, 2003	Socorro	LINEAR	·	1.2 km	MPC · JPL
180280	2003 WO_{73}	—	November 20, 2003	Socorro	LINEAR	·	1.2 km	MPC · JPL
180281	2003 WP_{76}	—	November 19, 2003	Socorro	LINEAR	·	1.1 km	MPC · JPL
180282	2003 WC_{78}	—	November 20, 2003	Kitt Peak	Spacewatch	·	990 m	MPC · JPL
180283	2003 WH_{81}	—	November 20, 2003	Kitt Peak	Spacewatch	·	980 m	MPC · JPL
180284	2003 WQ_{86}	—	November 21, 2003	Socorro	LINEAR	·	900 m	MPC · JPL
180285	2003 WC_{90}	—	November 16, 2003	Kitt Peak	Spacewatch	·	910 m	MPC · JPL
180286	2003 WT_{90}	—	November 18, 2003	Palomar	NEAT	·	820 m	MPC · JPL
180287	2003 WX_{94}	—	November 19, 2003	Anderson Mesa	LONEOS	V	930 m	MPC · JPL
180288	2003 WH_{102}	—	November 21, 2003	Socorro	LINEAR	·	1.7 km	MPC · JPL
180289	2003 WO_{104}	—	November 21, 2003	Socorro	LINEAR	·	1.0 km	MPC · JPL
180290	2003 WH_{109}	—	November 20, 2003	Socorro	LINEAR	·	1.1 km	MPC · JPL
180291	2003 WZ_{113}	—	November 20, 2003	Socorro	LINEAR	·	960 m	MPC · JPL
180292	2003 WJ_{119}	—	November 20, 2003	Socorro	LINEAR	(2076)	1.2 km	MPC · JPL
180293	2003 WS_{119}	—	November 20, 2003	Socorro	LINEAR	·	1.3 km	MPC · JPL
180294	2003 WG_{120}	—	November 20, 2003	Socorro	LINEAR	·	1.3 km	MPC · JPL
180295	2003 WQ_{120}	—	November 20, 2003	Socorro	LINEAR	·	1.3 km	MPC · JPL
180296	2003 WM_{127}	—	November 20, 2003	Socorro	LINEAR	·	1.4 km	MPC · JPL
180297	2003 WW_{127}	—	November 20, 2003	Socorro	LINEAR	·	3.2 km	MPC · JPL
180298	2003 WG_{129}	—	November 21, 2003	Socorro	LINEAR	NYS	2.1 km	MPC · JPL
180299	2003 WP_{130}	—	November 21, 2003	Socorro	LINEAR	·	1.1 km	MPC · JPL
180300	2003 WY_{132}	—	November 21, 2003	Socorro	LINEAR	·	1.4 km	MPC · JPL

== 180301–180400 ==
back to top

Designation			Discovery			Properties		Ref
Permanent	Provisional	Named after	Date	Site	Discoverer(s)	Category	Diam.	Ref
180301	2003 WE_{139}	—	November 21, 2003	Socorro	LINEAR	(5)	2.4 km	MPC · JPL
180302	2003 WR_{139}	—	November 21, 2003	Socorro	LINEAR	·	1.8 km	MPC · JPL
180303	2003 WQ_{140}	—	November 21, 2003	Socorro	LINEAR	V	1.1 km	MPC · JPL
180304	2003 WW_{140}	—	November 21, 2003	Socorro	LINEAR	·	2.1 km	MPC · JPL
180305	2003 WD_{151}	—	November 24, 2003	Palomar	NEAT	·	4.5 km	MPC · JPL
180306	2003 WQ_{160}	—	November 30, 2003	Kitt Peak	Spacewatch	·	870 m	MPC · JPL
180307	2003 WA_{162}	—	November 30, 2003	Kitt Peak	Spacewatch	·	810 m	MPC · JPL
180308	2003 WF_{170}	—	November 20, 2003	Catalina	CSS	·	1.1 km	MPC · JPL
180309	2003 XR	—	December 3, 2003	Socorro	LINEAR	·	1.1 km	MPC · JPL
180310	2003 XF_{1}	—	December 1, 2003	Kitt Peak	Spacewatch	·	1.7 km	MPC · JPL
180311	2003 XQ_{2}	—	December 1, 2003	Socorro	LINEAR	(2076)	1.2 km	MPC · JPL
180312	2003 XC_{3}	—	December 1, 2003	Socorro	LINEAR	·	1.3 km	MPC · JPL
180313	2003 XY_{3}	—	December 1, 2003	Socorro	LINEAR	NYS	1.5 km	MPC · JPL
180314	2003 XR_{4}	—	December 1, 2003	Socorro	LINEAR	·	1.4 km	MPC · JPL
180315	2003 XD_{7}	—	December 3, 2003	Socorro	LINEAR	BAR	2.5 km	MPC · JPL
180316	2003 XQ_{7}	—	December 1, 2003	Socorro	LINEAR	·	2.3 km	MPC · JPL
180317	2003 XS_{7}	—	December 1, 2003	Socorro	LINEAR	·	1.1 km	MPC · JPL
180318	2003 XE_{12}	—	December 14, 2003	Palomar	NEAT	·	1.1 km	MPC · JPL
180319	2003 XR_{21}	—	December 14, 2003	Kitt Peak	Spacewatch	·	1.4 km	MPC · JPL
180320	2003 XA_{26}	—	December 1, 2003	Socorro	LINEAR	·	980 m	MPC · JPL
180321	2003 XG_{38}	—	December 4, 2003	Socorro	LINEAR	·	1.5 km	MPC · JPL
180322	2003 YK_{2}	—	December 17, 2003	Črni Vrh	Mikuž, H.	·	1.3 km	MPC · JPL
180323	2003 YJ_{4}	—	December 16, 2003	Catalina	CSS	·	1.2 km	MPC · JPL
180324	2003 YQ_{4}	—	December 17, 2003	Socorro	LINEAR	·	1.3 km	MPC · JPL
180325	2003 YQ_{5}	—	December 16, 2003	Catalina	CSS	NYS	1.7 km	MPC · JPL
180326	2003 YW_{12}	—	December 17, 2003	Anderson Mesa	LONEOS	·	1.5 km	MPC · JPL
180327	2003 YD_{16}	—	December 17, 2003	Anderson Mesa	LONEOS	·	1.2 km	MPC · JPL
180328	2003 YE_{16}	—	December 17, 2003	Anderson Mesa	LONEOS	·	1.5 km	MPC · JPL
180329	2003 YH_{17}	—	December 17, 2003	Kitt Peak	Spacewatch	NYS	1.6 km	MPC · JPL
180330	2003 YE_{21}	—	December 17, 2003	Kitt Peak	Spacewatch	·	1.8 km	MPC · JPL
180331	2003 YN_{21}	—	December 17, 2003	Kitt Peak	Spacewatch	PHO	1.4 km	MPC · JPL
180332	2003 YQ_{21}	—	December 17, 2003	Kitt Peak	Spacewatch	·	1.3 km	MPC · JPL
180333	2003 YE_{29}	—	December 17, 2003	Kitt Peak	Spacewatch	·	1.5 km	MPC · JPL
180334	2003 YN_{30}	—	December 18, 2003	Socorro	LINEAR	NYS	1.0 km	MPC · JPL
180335	2003 YC_{33}	—	December 16, 2003	Catalina	CSS	V	960 m	MPC · JPL
180336	2003 YO_{34}	—	December 18, 2003	Socorro	LINEAR	·	1.2 km	MPC · JPL
180337	2003 YZ_{35}	—	December 19, 2003	Socorro	LINEAR	NYS	1.3 km	MPC · JPL
180338	2003 YS_{37}	—	December 18, 2003	Kitt Peak	Spacewatch	·	1.1 km	MPC · JPL
180339	2003 YJ_{42}	—	December 19, 2003	Kitt Peak	Spacewatch	MAS	980 m	MPC · JPL
180340	2003 YN_{47}	—	December 18, 2003	Socorro	LINEAR	·	1.8 km	MPC · JPL
180341	2003 YQ_{55}	—	December 19, 2003	Socorro	LINEAR	·	1.9 km	MPC · JPL
180342	2003 YH_{58}	—	December 19, 2003	Socorro	LINEAR	NYS	2.2 km	MPC · JPL
180343	2003 YX_{60}	—	December 19, 2003	Socorro	LINEAR	·	1.3 km	MPC · JPL
180344	2003 YB_{61}	—	December 19, 2003	Socorro	LINEAR	·	1.5 km	MPC · JPL
180345	2003 YE_{63}	—	December 19, 2003	Socorro	LINEAR	·	1.8 km	MPC · JPL
180346	2003 YA_{64}	—	December 19, 2003	Socorro	LINEAR	V	1.2 km	MPC · JPL
180347	2003 YK_{65}	—	December 19, 2003	Socorro	LINEAR	·	1.6 km	MPC · JPL
180348	2003 YS_{68}	—	December 19, 2003	Socorro	LINEAR	·	1.8 km	MPC · JPL
180349	2003 YW_{71}	—	December 18, 2003	Socorro	LINEAR	CLA	2.1 km	MPC · JPL
180350	2003 YR_{73}	—	December 18, 2003	Socorro	LINEAR	·	3.2 km	MPC · JPL
180351	2003 YV_{73}	—	December 18, 2003	Socorro	LINEAR	MAS	990 m	MPC · JPL
180352	2003 YD_{75}	—	December 18, 2003	Socorro	LINEAR	·	1.4 km	MPC · JPL
180353	2003 YG_{75}	—	December 18, 2003	Socorro	LINEAR	·	1.7 km	MPC · JPL
180354	2003 YL_{76}	—	December 18, 2003	Socorro	LINEAR	(1338) (FLO)	970 m	MPC · JPL
180355	2003 YK_{78}	—	December 18, 2003	Socorro	LINEAR	·	1.6 km	MPC · JPL
180356	2003 YO_{82}	—	December 18, 2003	Socorro	LINEAR	·	1.0 km	MPC · JPL
180357	2003 YM_{84}	—	December 19, 2003	Socorro	LINEAR	·	1.9 km	MPC · JPL
180358	2003 YA_{85}	—	December 19, 2003	Socorro	LINEAR	·	2.7 km	MPC · JPL
180359	2003 YQ_{85}	—	December 19, 2003	Socorro	LINEAR	·	1.5 km	MPC · JPL
180360	2003 YJ_{91}	—	December 20, 2003	Socorro	LINEAR	(2076)	1.4 km	MPC · JPL
180361	2003 YS_{93}	—	December 21, 2003	Socorro	LINEAR	·	1.6 km	MPC · JPL
180362	2003 YA_{94}	—	December 21, 2003	Kitt Peak	Spacewatch	·	1.4 km	MPC · JPL
180363	2003 YZ_{94}	—	December 19, 2003	Socorro	LINEAR	·	1.3 km	MPC · JPL
180364	2003 YG_{106}	—	December 22, 2003	Socorro	LINEAR	·	1.3 km	MPC · JPL
180365	2003 YZ_{106}	—	December 22, 2003	Kitt Peak	Spacewatch	·	1.3 km	MPC · JPL
180366	2003 YA_{109}	—	December 22, 2003	Socorro	LINEAR	·	2.2 km	MPC · JPL
180367 VonFeldt	2003 YQ_{110}	VonFeldt	December 22, 2003	Needville	Wells, D.	·	2.1 km	MPC · JPL
180368	2003 YB_{111}	—	December 27, 2003	Desert Eagle	W. K. Y. Yeung	NYS	1.5 km	MPC · JPL
180369	2003 YQ_{111}	—	December 23, 2003	Socorro	LINEAR	·	970 m	MPC · JPL
180370	2003 YB_{120}	—	December 27, 2003	Socorro	LINEAR	·	2.0 km	MPC · JPL
180371	2003 YW_{122}	—	December 27, 2003	Socorro	LINEAR	·	1.6 km	MPC · JPL
180372	2003 YH_{125}	—	December 27, 2003	Socorro	LINEAR	·	1.1 km	MPC · JPL
180373	2003 YJ_{125}	—	December 27, 2003	Socorro	LINEAR	·	1.4 km	MPC · JPL
180374	2003 YW_{127}	—	December 27, 2003	Socorro	LINEAR	(2076)	1.2 km	MPC · JPL
180375	2003 YH_{129}	—	December 27, 2003	Socorro	LINEAR	·	1.3 km	MPC · JPL
180376	2003 YC_{131}	—	December 28, 2003	Socorro	LINEAR	·	950 m	MPC · JPL
180377	2003 YC_{134}	—	December 28, 2003	Socorro	LINEAR	·	1.4 km	MPC · JPL
180378	2003 YE_{134}	—	December 28, 2003	Socorro	LINEAR	·	1.9 km	MPC · JPL
180379	2003 YR_{136}	—	December 18, 2003	Palomar	NEAT	NYS	1.5 km	MPC · JPL
180380	2003 YO_{139}	—	December 28, 2003	Socorro	LINEAR	·	1.4 km	MPC · JPL
180381	2003 YG_{140}	—	December 28, 2003	Socorro	LINEAR	NYS	1.5 km	MPC · JPL
180382	2003 YV_{144}	—	December 28, 2003	Socorro	LINEAR	V	1.1 km	MPC · JPL
180383	2003 YJ_{146}	—	December 28, 2003	Socorro	LINEAR	·	2.3 km	MPC · JPL
180384	2003 YF_{147}	—	December 29, 2003	Socorro	LINEAR	·	2.4 km	MPC · JPL
180385	2003 YJ_{151}	—	December 29, 2003	Catalina	CSS	·	3.8 km	MPC · JPL
180386	2003 YS_{153}	—	December 29, 2003	Catalina	CSS	·	1.4 km	MPC · JPL
180387	2003 YQ_{168}	—	December 18, 2003	Socorro	LINEAR	·	1.4 km	MPC · JPL
180388	2003 YU_{171}	—	December 18, 2003	Kitt Peak	Spacewatch	·	1.9 km	MPC · JPL
180389	2004 AD_{2}	—	January 13, 2004	Anderson Mesa	LONEOS	·	1.5 km	MPC · JPL
180390	2004 AM_{7}	—	January 13, 2004	Anderson Mesa	LONEOS	·	2.1 km	MPC · JPL
180391	2004 AO_{7}	—	January 13, 2004	Anderson Mesa	LONEOS	V	1.2 km	MPC · JPL
180392	2004 AQ_{7}	—	January 13, 2004	Anderson Mesa	LONEOS	NYS	2.0 km	MPC · JPL
180393	2004 AC_{10}	—	January 15, 2004	Kitt Peak	Spacewatch	MAS	840 m	MPC · JPL
180394	2004 AG_{10}	—	January 15, 2004	Kitt Peak	Spacewatch	·	1.7 km	MPC · JPL
180395	2004 AH_{13}	—	January 13, 2004	Kitt Peak	Spacewatch	·	1.6 km	MPC · JPL
180396	2004 BK_{2}	—	January 16, 2004	Palomar	NEAT	MAS	940 m	MPC · JPL
180397	2004 BB_{5}	—	January 16, 2004	Palomar	NEAT	NYS	1.4 km	MPC · JPL
180398	2004 BC_{10}	—	January 16, 2004	Palomar	NEAT	V	930 m	MPC · JPL
180399	2004 BN_{11}	—	January 16, 2004	Palomar	NEAT	·	1.5 km	MPC · JPL
180400	2004 BD_{12}	—	January 16, 2004	Palomar	NEAT	·	1.6 km	MPC · JPL

== 180401–180500 ==
back to top

Designation			Discovery			Properties		Ref
Permanent	Provisional	Named after	Date	Site	Discoverer(s)	Category	Diam.	Ref
180401	2004 BT_{19}	—	January 17, 2004	Palomar	NEAT	·	3.1 km	MPC · JPL
180402	2004 BR_{20}	—	January 16, 2004	Kitt Peak	Spacewatch	·	1.8 km	MPC · JPL
180403	2004 BC_{24}	—	January 19, 2004	Anderson Mesa	LONEOS	·	1.9 km	MPC · JPL
180404	2004 BT_{27}	—	January 18, 2004	Palomar	NEAT	MAS	1.2 km	MPC · JPL
180405	2004 BG_{28}	—	January 18, 2004	Palomar	NEAT	MAS	1.1 km	MPC · JPL
180406	2004 BJ_{29}	—	January 18, 2004	Palomar	NEAT	·	2.1 km	MPC · JPL
180407	2004 BA_{32}	—	January 19, 2004	Kitt Peak	Spacewatch	NYS	1.6 km	MPC · JPL
180408	2004 BV_{36}	—	January 19, 2004	Kitt Peak	Spacewatch	MAS	1.1 km	MPC · JPL
180409	2004 BX_{37}	—	January 19, 2004	Catalina	CSS	·	2.2 km	MPC · JPL
180410	2004 BT_{42}	—	January 19, 2004	Catalina	CSS	EUN	1.8 km	MPC · JPL
180411	2004 BY_{43}	—	January 22, 2004	Socorro	LINEAR	·	1.9 km	MPC · JPL
180412	2004 BY_{44}	—	January 22, 2004	Socorro	LINEAR	V	990 m	MPC · JPL
180413	2004 BO_{46}	—	January 21, 2004	Socorro	LINEAR	·	2.4 km	MPC · JPL
180414	2004 BR_{46}	—	January 21, 2004	Socorro	LINEAR	·	2.1 km	MPC · JPL
180415	2004 BZ_{46}	—	January 21, 2004	Socorro	LINEAR	·	2.3 km	MPC · JPL
180416	2004 BT_{50}	—	January 21, 2004	Socorro	LINEAR	PHO	1.3 km	MPC · JPL
180417	2004 BH_{56}	—	January 23, 2004	Anderson Mesa	LONEOS	·	2.1 km	MPC · JPL
180418	2004 BW_{57}	—	January 23, 2004	Anderson Mesa	LONEOS	·	2.5 km	MPC · JPL
180419	2004 BO_{70}	—	January 22, 2004	Socorro	LINEAR	·	1.5 km	MPC · JPL
180420	2004 BZ_{72}	—	January 24, 2004	Socorro	LINEAR	·	2.7 km	MPC · JPL
180421	2004 BT_{73}	—	January 24, 2004	Socorro	LINEAR	·	2.2 km	MPC · JPL
180422	2004 BO_{75}	—	January 23, 2004	Anderson Mesa	LONEOS	EUN	1.8 km	MPC · JPL
180423	2004 BQ_{75}	—	January 23, 2004	Socorro	LINEAR	PHO	1.4 km	MPC · JPL
180424	2004 BJ_{78}	—	January 22, 2004	Socorro	LINEAR	·	1.6 km	MPC · JPL
180425	2004 BL_{78}	—	January 22, 2004	Socorro	LINEAR	·	1.2 km	MPC · JPL
180426	2004 BK_{81}	—	January 26, 2004	Anderson Mesa	LONEOS	NYS	1.6 km	MPC · JPL
180427	2004 BQ_{82}	—	January 23, 2004	Socorro	LINEAR	·	3.6 km	MPC · JPL
180428	2004 BR_{83}	—	January 23, 2004	Socorro	LINEAR	V	1.1 km	MPC · JPL
180429	2004 BY_{84}	—	January 27, 2004	Socorro	LINEAR	NYS	1.4 km	MPC · JPL
180430	2004 BF_{93}	—	January 27, 2004	Anderson Mesa	LONEOS	·	4.6 km	MPC · JPL
180431	2004 BR_{96}	—	January 24, 2004	Socorro	LINEAR	·	1.6 km	MPC · JPL
180432	2004 BB_{97}	—	January 24, 2004	Socorro	LINEAR	·	1.9 km	MPC · JPL
180433	2004 BD_{99}	—	January 27, 2004	Kitt Peak	Spacewatch	PHO	2.1 km	MPC · JPL
180434	2004 BV_{101}	—	January 29, 2004	Socorro	LINEAR	ERI	3.7 km	MPC · JPL
180435	2004 BD_{104}	—	January 23, 2004	Socorro	LINEAR	·	2.0 km	MPC · JPL
180436	2004 BA_{106}	—	January 26, 2004	Anderson Mesa	LONEOS	·	2.0 km	MPC · JPL
180437	2004 BJ_{106}	—	January 26, 2004	Anderson Mesa	LONEOS	·	2.1 km	MPC · JPL
180438	2004 BY_{106}	—	January 27, 2004	Kitt Peak	Spacewatch	·	1.9 km	MPC · JPL
180439	2004 BN_{107}	—	January 28, 2004	Catalina	CSS	·	1.9 km	MPC · JPL
180440	2004 BQ_{107}	—	January 28, 2004	Catalina	CSS	V	1.1 km	MPC · JPL
180441	2004 BA_{109}	—	January 28, 2004	Catalina	CSS	·	2.3 km	MPC · JPL
180442	2004 BC_{109}	—	January 28, 2004	Kitt Peak	Spacewatch	MAS	1.2 km	MPC · JPL
180443	2004 BL_{113}	—	January 28, 2004	Socorro	LINEAR	·	3.6 km	MPC · JPL
180444	2004 BY_{113}	—	January 29, 2004	Socorro	LINEAR	·	1.6 km	MPC · JPL
180445	2004 BG_{116}	—	January 26, 2004	Anderson Mesa	LONEOS	V	1.1 km	MPC · JPL
180446	2004 BH_{116}	—	January 26, 2004	Anderson Mesa	LONEOS	·	3.0 km	MPC · JPL
180447	2004 BJ_{118}	—	January 29, 2004	Socorro	LINEAR	·	2.4 km	MPC · JPL
180448	2004 BQ_{124}	—	January 16, 2004	Palomar	NEAT	(2076)	1.4 km	MPC · JPL
180449	2004 BG_{128}	—	January 16, 2004	Kitt Peak	Spacewatch	MAS	1.1 km	MPC · JPL
180450	2004 BK_{142}	—	January 19, 2004	Socorro	LINEAR	·	2.4 km	MPC · JPL
180451	2004 BR_{146}	—	January 22, 2004	Socorro	LINEAR	·	1.5 km	MPC · JPL
180452	2004 BB_{148}	—	January 16, 2004	Kitt Peak	Spacewatch	V	940 m	MPC · JPL
180453	2004 BR_{149}	—	January 16, 2004	Kitt Peak	Spacewatch	·	1.8 km	MPC · JPL
180454	2004 BH_{150}	—	January 17, 2004	Palomar	NEAT	·	1.7 km	MPC · JPL
180455	2004 BZ_{162}	—	January 17, 2004	Kitt Peak	Spacewatch	·	1.8 km	MPC · JPL
180456	2004 CN	—	February 3, 2004	Socorro	LINEAR	PHO	1.8 km	MPC · JPL
180457	2004 CQ_{2}	—	February 12, 2004	Desert Eagle	W. K. Y. Yeung	·	1.9 km	MPC · JPL
180458	2004 CJ_{4}	—	February 10, 2004	Palomar	NEAT	NYS	1.5 km	MPC · JPL
180459	2004 CY_{5}	—	February 10, 2004	Palomar	NEAT	NYS	1.6 km	MPC · JPL
180460	2004 CD_{13}	—	February 11, 2004	Palomar	NEAT	EUN	1.5 km	MPC · JPL
180461	2004 CB_{17}	—	February 11, 2004	Kitt Peak	Spacewatch	·	1.3 km	MPC · JPL
180462	2004 CV_{17}	—	February 10, 2004	Palomar	NEAT	·	1.5 km	MPC · JPL
180463	2004 CQ_{18}	—	February 10, 2004	Palomar	NEAT	·	1.6 km	MPC · JPL
180464	2004 CZ_{21}	—	February 11, 2004	Palomar	NEAT	·	1.5 km	MPC · JPL
180465	2004 CT_{26}	—	February 11, 2004	Catalina	CSS	·	2.1 km	MPC · JPL
180466	2004 CW_{26}	—	February 11, 2004	Palomar	NEAT	MAS	1.2 km	MPC · JPL
180467	2004 CC_{27}	—	February 11, 2004	Palomar	NEAT	·	1.5 km	MPC · JPL
180468	2004 CS_{27}	—	February 12, 2004	Kitt Peak	Spacewatch	MAS	920 m	MPC · JPL
180469	2004 CV_{36}	—	February 12, 2004	Desert Eagle	W. K. Y. Yeung	·	2.0 km	MPC · JPL
180470	2004 CH_{40}	—	February 11, 2004	Catalina	CSS	·	2.2 km	MPC · JPL
180471	2004 CH_{43}	—	February 12, 2004	Kitt Peak	Spacewatch	·	2.0 km	MPC · JPL
180472	2004 CN_{46}	—	February 13, 2004	Kitt Peak	Spacewatch	·	1.5 km	MPC · JPL
180473	2004 CG_{51}	—	February 13, 2004	Desert Eagle	W. K. Y. Yeung	·	1.6 km	MPC · JPL
180474	2004 CU_{52}	—	February 10, 2004	Catalina	CSS	·	1.3 km	MPC · JPL
180475	2004 CX_{52}	—	February 10, 2004	Catalina	CSS	·	1.9 km	MPC · JPL
180476	2004 CG_{54}	—	February 11, 2004	Kitt Peak	Spacewatch	NYS	1.8 km	MPC · JPL
180477	2004 CF_{56}	—	February 14, 2004	Haleakala	NEAT	·	2.1 km	MPC · JPL
180478	2004 CQ_{61}	—	February 11, 2004	Kitt Peak	Spacewatch	·	2.1 km	MPC · JPL
180479	2004 CB_{63}	—	February 12, 2004	Palomar	NEAT	·	2.8 km	MPC · JPL
180480	2004 CU_{67}	—	February 10, 2004	Catalina	CSS	·	2.1 km	MPC · JPL
180481	2004 CE_{68}	—	February 11, 2004	Kitt Peak	Spacewatch	·	1.9 km	MPC · JPL
180482	2004 CO_{69}	—	February 11, 2004	Palomar	NEAT	·	2.3 km	MPC · JPL
180483	2004 CP_{69}	—	February 11, 2004	Palomar	NEAT	V	1.1 km	MPC · JPL
180484	2004 CJ_{71}	—	February 13, 2004	Kitt Peak	Spacewatch	·	2.9 km	MPC · JPL
180485	2004 CP_{72}	—	February 13, 2004	Kitt Peak	Spacewatch	V	1.1 km	MPC · JPL
180486	2004 CO_{73}	—	February 14, 2004	Haleakala	NEAT	NYS	1.7 km	MPC · JPL
180487	2004 CW_{75}	—	February 11, 2004	Kitt Peak	Spacewatch	·	1.3 km	MPC · JPL
180488	2004 CK_{76}	—	February 11, 2004	Palomar	NEAT	NYS	1.7 km	MPC · JPL
180489	2004 CJ_{78}	—	February 11, 2004	Palomar	NEAT	MAS	1.2 km	MPC · JPL
180490	2004 CM_{78}	—	February 11, 2004	Palomar	NEAT	NYS	1.5 km	MPC · JPL
180491	2004 CM_{79}	—	February 11, 2004	Palomar	NEAT	MAS	1.1 km	MPC · JPL
180492	2004 CX_{79}	—	February 11, 2004	Palomar	NEAT	MAS	970 m	MPC · JPL
180493	2004 CK_{81}	—	February 12, 2004	Kitt Peak	Spacewatch	·	1.9 km	MPC · JPL
180494	2004 CP_{82}	—	February 12, 2004	Kitt Peak	Spacewatch	MAS	1.1 km	MPC · JPL
180495	2004 CL_{84}	—	February 13, 2004	Kitt Peak	Spacewatch	·	2.6 km	MPC · JPL
180496	2004 CQ_{84}	—	February 13, 2004	Kitt Peak	Spacewatch	·	1.7 km	MPC · JPL
180497	2004 CT_{86}	—	February 15, 2004	Palomar	NEAT	·	1.8 km	MPC · JPL
180498	2004 CC_{90}	—	February 12, 2004	Kitt Peak	Spacewatch	·	1.4 km	MPC · JPL
180499	2004 CM_{90}	—	February 12, 2004	Palomar	NEAT	·	2.0 km	MPC · JPL
180500	2004 CT_{91}	—	February 13, 2004	Palomar	NEAT	·	1.9 km	MPC · JPL

== 180501–180600 ==
back to top

Designation			Discovery			Properties		Ref
Permanent	Provisional	Named after	Date	Site	Discoverer(s)	Category	Diam.	Ref
180501	2004 CK_{92}	—	February 14, 2004	Haleakala	NEAT	PHO	1.3 km	MPC · JPL
180502	2004 CT_{93}	—	February 11, 2004	Kitt Peak	Spacewatch	(6769)	1.8 km	MPC · JPL
180503	2004 CA_{99}	—	February 14, 2004	Catalina	CSS	·	1.7 km	MPC · JPL
180504	2004 CR_{99}	—	February 15, 2004	Catalina	CSS	·	2.6 km	MPC · JPL
180505	2004 CM_{100}	—	February 15, 2004	Catalina	CSS	·	2.6 km	MPC · JPL
180506	2004 CD_{101}	—	February 15, 2004	Catalina	CSS	·	2.7 km	MPC · JPL
180507	2004 CA_{118}	—	February 11, 2004	Palomar	NEAT	NYS	1.5 km	MPC · JPL
180508	2004 CT_{130}	—	February 14, 2004	Kitt Peak	Spacewatch	NYS	1.7 km	MPC · JPL
180509	2004 DZ_{2}	—	February 16, 2004	Kitt Peak	Spacewatch	·	1.9 km	MPC · JPL
180510	2004 DH_{5}	—	February 16, 2004	Kitt Peak	Spacewatch	·	1.6 km	MPC · JPL
180511	2004 DC_{10}	—	February 17, 2004	Kitt Peak	Spacewatch	·	2.3 km	MPC · JPL
180512	2004 DX_{15}	—	February 17, 2004	Socorro	LINEAR	·	2.1 km	MPC · JPL
180513	2004 DV_{17}	—	February 18, 2004	Socorro	LINEAR	MAS	940 m	MPC · JPL
180514	2004 DB_{21}	—	February 17, 2004	Socorro	LINEAR	·	4.8 km	MPC · JPL
180515	2004 DB_{26}	—	February 16, 2004	Socorro	LINEAR	·	1.8 km	MPC · JPL
180516	2004 DL_{30}	—	February 17, 2004	Socorro	LINEAR	·	1.6 km	MPC · JPL
180517	2004 DX_{30}	—	February 17, 2004	Socorro	LINEAR	·	1.6 km	MPC · JPL
180518	2004 DP_{32}	—	February 18, 2004	Kitt Peak	Spacewatch	·	1.8 km	MPC · JPL
180519	2004 DZ_{32}	—	February 18, 2004	Socorro	LINEAR	NYS	2.7 km	MPC · JPL
180520	2004 DA_{33}	—	February 18, 2004	Socorro	LINEAR	·	1.5 km	MPC · JPL
180521	2004 DJ_{35}	—	February 19, 2004	Socorro	LINEAR	·	2.1 km	MPC · JPL
180522	2004 DS_{36}	—	February 19, 2004	Socorro	LINEAR	·	2.7 km	MPC · JPL
180523	2004 DR_{38}	—	February 20, 2004	Kleť	Kleť	·	2.2 km	MPC · JPL
180524	2004 DK_{39}	—	February 22, 2004	Kitt Peak	Spacewatch	·	1.5 km	MPC · JPL
180525	2004 DN_{42}	—	February 19, 2004	Socorro	LINEAR	·	2.4 km	MPC · JPL
180526	2004 DB_{45}	—	February 23, 2004	Socorro	LINEAR	·	2.4 km	MPC · JPL
180527	2004 DL_{47}	—	February 19, 2004	Socorro	LINEAR	·	1.6 km	MPC · JPL
180528	2004 DJ_{48}	—	February 19, 2004	Socorro	LINEAR	MAR	1.7 km	MPC · JPL
180529	2004 DS_{48}	—	February 19, 2004	Socorro	LINEAR	·	1.8 km	MPC · JPL
180530	2004 DV_{51}	—	February 23, 2004	Socorro	LINEAR	·	1.8 km	MPC · JPL
180531	2004 DK_{55}	—	February 22, 2004	Kitt Peak	Spacewatch	·	3.7 km	MPC · JPL
180532	2004 DU_{59}	—	February 25, 2004	Socorro	LINEAR	·	1.7 km	MPC · JPL
180533	2004 DO_{70}	—	February 26, 2004	Socorro	LINEAR	·	1.4 km	MPC · JPL
180534	2004 DE_{74}	—	February 17, 2004	Kitt Peak	Spacewatch	MAR	1.4 km	MPC · JPL
180535	2004 DE_{77}	—	February 18, 2004	Socorro	LINEAR	·	2.6 km	MPC · JPL
180536	2004 EV	—	March 1, 2004	Catalina	CSS	·	2.0 km	MPC · JPL
180537	2004 EB_{1}	—	March 14, 2004	Wrightwood	J. W. Young	MAR	1.8 km	MPC · JPL
180538	2004 EA_{5}	—	March 11, 2004	Palomar	NEAT	·	1.7 km	MPC · JPL
180539	2004 EJ_{8}	—	March 13, 2004	Palomar	NEAT	EUN	1.4 km	MPC · JPL
180540	2004 EY_{9}	—	March 11, 2004	Palomar	NEAT	·	3.3 km	MPC · JPL
180541	2004 ES_{10}	—	March 15, 2004	Desert Eagle	W. K. Y. Yeung	(5)	1.7 km	MPC · JPL
180542	2004 ER_{11}	—	March 10, 2004	Palomar	NEAT	·	1.9 km	MPC · JPL
180543	2004 EY_{14}	—	March 11, 2004	Palomar	NEAT	·	1.7 km	MPC · JPL
180544	2004 ET_{15}	—	March 12, 2004	Palomar	NEAT	NYS	1.5 km	MPC · JPL
180545	2004 EJ_{16}	—	March 12, 2004	Palomar	NEAT	·	1.5 km	MPC · JPL
180546	2004 ED_{17}	—	March 12, 2004	Palomar	NEAT	·	2.0 km	MPC · JPL
180547	2004 EO_{17}	—	March 12, 2004	Palomar	NEAT	RAF	1.5 km	MPC · JPL
180548	2004 EQ_{17}	—	March 12, 2004	Palomar	NEAT	·	2.8 km	MPC · JPL
180549	2004 EV_{19}	—	March 14, 2004	Socorro	LINEAR	EUN	1.6 km	MPC · JPL
180550	2004 EX_{20}	—	March 15, 2004	Socorro	LINEAR	BAR	1.9 km	MPC · JPL
180551	2004 EE_{22}	—	March 15, 2004	Socorro	LINEAR	·	1.5 km	MPC · JPL
180552	2004 EB_{24}	—	March 15, 2004	Catalina	CSS	·	2.0 km	MPC · JPL
180553	2004 ED_{24}	—	March 15, 2004	Goodricke-Pigott	Goodricke-Pigott	·	2.2 km	MPC · JPL
180554	2004 EH_{24}	—	March 15, 2004	Črni Vrh	Matičič, S.	·	1.5 km	MPC · JPL
180555	2004 ER_{25}	—	March 13, 2004	Palomar	NEAT	·	2.7 km	MPC · JPL
180556	2004 EV_{25}	—	March 13, 2004	Palomar	NEAT	·	2.7 km	MPC · JPL
180557	2004 ET_{34}	—	March 12, 2004	Palomar	NEAT	·	1.4 km	MPC · JPL
180558	2004 EF_{47}	—	March 15, 2004	Kitt Peak	Spacewatch	·	1.5 km	MPC · JPL
180559	2004 ES_{53}	—	March 15, 2004	Socorro	LINEAR	·	2.1 km	MPC · JPL
180560	2004 EB_{54}	—	March 15, 2004	Campo Imperatore	CINEOS	·	1.4 km	MPC · JPL
180561	2004 EU_{56}	—	March 14, 2004	Palomar	NEAT	·	2.4 km	MPC · JPL
180562	2004 EC_{66}	—	March 14, 2004	Kitt Peak	Spacewatch	·	1.5 km	MPC · JPL
180563	2004 EB_{67}	—	March 15, 2004	Kitt Peak	Spacewatch	HNS	1.7 km	MPC · JPL
180564	2004 EM_{68}	—	March 15, 2004	Socorro	LINEAR	EOS	3.8 km	MPC · JPL
180565	2004 EU_{70}	—	March 15, 2004	Kitt Peak	Spacewatch	MIS	3.2 km	MPC · JPL
180566	2004 EE_{73}	—	March 15, 2004	Catalina	CSS	·	3.3 km	MPC · JPL
180567	2004 ET_{80}	—	March 15, 2004	Catalina	CSS	(5)	3.2 km	MPC · JPL
180568	2004 EC_{84}	—	March 14, 2004	Palomar	NEAT	·	2.0 km	MPC · JPL
180569	2004 ED_{84}	—	March 14, 2004	Palomar	NEAT	·	1.9 km	MPC · JPL
180570	2004 EQ_{86}	—	March 15, 2004	Kitt Peak	Spacewatch	·	1.9 km	MPC · JPL
180571	2004 EA_{87}	—	March 15, 2004	Kitt Peak	Spacewatch	·	2.9 km	MPC · JPL
180572	2004 ER_{102}	—	March 15, 2004	Kitt Peak	Spacewatch	NYS	1.5 km	MPC · JPL
180573	2004 EF_{106}	—	March 15, 2004	Kitt Peak	Spacewatch	·	3.6 km	MPC · JPL
180574	2004 EP_{108}	—	March 15, 2004	Kitt Peak	Spacewatch	·	1.9 km	MPC · JPL
180575	2004 FU_{7}	—	March 16, 2004	Socorro	LINEAR	·	3.7 km	MPC · JPL
180576	2004 FV_{7}	—	March 16, 2004	Palomar	NEAT	·	2.5 km	MPC · JPL
180577	2004 FA_{10}	—	March 16, 2004	Campo Imperatore	CINEOS	(5)	2.0 km	MPC · JPL
180578	2004 FL_{18}	—	March 28, 2004	Desert Eagle	W. K. Y. Yeung	·	1.4 km	MPC · JPL
180579	2004 FU_{19}	—	March 16, 2004	Socorro	LINEAR	ADE	2.6 km	MPC · JPL
180580	2004 FF_{20}	—	March 16, 2004	Socorro	LINEAR	·	2.0 km	MPC · JPL
180581	2004 FS_{20}	—	March 16, 2004	Catalina	CSS	·	1.7 km	MPC · JPL
180582	2004 FU_{22}	—	March 17, 2004	Kitt Peak	Spacewatch	NYS	1.3 km	MPC · JPL
180583	2004 FP_{24}	—	March 17, 2004	Socorro	LINEAR	·	2.1 km	MPC · JPL
180584	2004 FD_{27}	—	March 17, 2004	Kitt Peak	Spacewatch	·	1.4 km	MPC · JPL
180585	2004 FJ_{35}	—	March 16, 2004	Kitt Peak	Spacewatch	·	1.9 km	MPC · JPL
180586	2004 FL_{35}	—	March 16, 2004	Socorro	LINEAR	·	2.0 km	MPC · JPL
180587	2004 FQ_{35}	—	March 16, 2004	Socorro	LINEAR	·	3.6 km	MPC · JPL
180588	2004 FK_{41}	—	March 18, 2004	Socorro	LINEAR	·	2.2 km	MPC · JPL
180589	2004 FR_{41}	—	March 21, 2004	Anderson Mesa	LONEOS	·	2.7 km	MPC · JPL
180590	2004 FN_{44}	—	March 16, 2004	Desert Eagle	W. K. Y. Yeung	·	2.8 km	MPC · JPL
180591	2004 FC_{47}	—	March 18, 2004	Kitt Peak	Spacewatch	·	1.9 km	MPC · JPL
180592	2004 FK_{49}	—	March 18, 2004	Socorro	LINEAR	·	1.6 km	MPC · JPL
180593	2004 FG_{51}	—	March 19, 2004	Palomar	NEAT	V	1.0 km	MPC · JPL
180594	2004 FH_{61}	—	March 19, 2004	Socorro	LINEAR	NYS	1.8 km	MPC · JPL
180595	2004 FP_{61}	—	March 19, 2004	Socorro	LINEAR	HNS	1.8 km	MPC · JPL
180596	2004 FJ_{63}	—	March 19, 2004	Socorro	LINEAR	·	2.4 km	MPC · JPL
180597	2004 FL_{64}	—	March 19, 2004	Socorro	LINEAR	·	2.4 km	MPC · JPL
180598	2004 FS_{64}	—	March 19, 2004	Socorro	LINEAR	MIS	3.9 km	MPC · JPL
180599	2004 FQ_{79}	—	March 20, 2004	Haleakala	NEAT	EUN	1.3 km	MPC · JPL
180600	2004 FV_{79}	—	March 20, 2004	Kitt Peak	Spacewatch	·	1.9 km	MPC · JPL

== 180601–180700 ==
back to top

Designation			Discovery			Properties		Ref
Permanent	Provisional	Named after	Date	Site	Discoverer(s)	Category	Diam.	Ref
180601	2004 FH_{81}	—	March 16, 2004	Socorro	LINEAR	·	4.9 km	MPC · JPL
180602	2004 FM_{82}	—	March 17, 2004	Kitt Peak	Spacewatch	·	3.1 km	MPC · JPL
180603	2004 FY_{83}	—	March 18, 2004	Kitt Peak	Spacewatch	·	2.7 km	MPC · JPL
180604	2004 FX_{89}	—	March 20, 2004	Socorro	LINEAR	·	2.0 km	MPC · JPL
180605	2004 FC_{92}	—	March 29, 2004	Socorro	LINEAR	·	4.2 km	MPC · JPL
180606	2004 FE_{94}	—	March 22, 2004	Socorro	LINEAR	·	1.6 km	MPC · JPL
180607	2004 FM_{94}	—	March 23, 2004	Kitt Peak	Spacewatch	·	2.0 km	MPC · JPL
180608	2004 FB_{96}	—	March 23, 2004	Socorro	LINEAR	·	2.0 km	MPC · JPL
180609	2004 FQ_{97}	—	March 23, 2004	Socorro	LINEAR	·	3.6 km	MPC · JPL
180610	2004 FD_{100}	—	March 23, 2004	Kitt Peak	Spacewatch	·	2.2 km	MPC · JPL
180611	2004 FD_{105}	—	March 23, 2004	Socorro	LINEAR	·	3.0 km	MPC · JPL
180612	2004 FP_{106}	—	March 20, 2004	Socorro	LINEAR	·	1.7 km	MPC · JPL
180613	2004 FM_{108}	—	March 23, 2004	Kitt Peak	Spacewatch	·	3.7 km	MPC · JPL
180614	2004 FV_{116}	—	March 23, 2004	Socorro	LINEAR	·	3.3 km	MPC · JPL
180615	2004 FZ_{117}	—	March 22, 2004	Socorro	LINEAR	·	1.4 km	MPC · JPL
180616	2004 FQ_{118}	—	March 22, 2004	Socorro	LINEAR	·	3.1 km	MPC · JPL
180617	2004 FZ_{118}	—	March 22, 2004	Socorro	LINEAR	·	3.5 km	MPC · JPL
180618	2004 FD_{121}	—	March 23, 2004	Socorro	LINEAR	·	2.5 km	MPC · JPL
180619	2004 FZ_{121}	—	March 24, 2004	Anderson Mesa	LONEOS	·	2.7 km	MPC · JPL
180620	2004 FE_{126}	—	March 27, 2004	Socorro	LINEAR	·	3.3 km	MPC · JPL
180621	2004 FM_{126}	—	March 27, 2004	Socorro	LINEAR	·	2.8 km	MPC · JPL
180622	2004 FD_{127}	—	March 27, 2004	Socorro	LINEAR	·	2.6 km	MPC · JPL
180623	2004 FJ_{127}	—	March 27, 2004	Socorro	LINEAR	·	2.6 km	MPC · JPL
180624	2004 FW_{127}	—	March 27, 2004	Socorro	LINEAR	·	1.8 km	MPC · JPL
180625	2004 FW_{134}	—	March 26, 2004	Socorro	LINEAR	·	2.8 km	MPC · JPL
180626	2004 FL_{136}	—	March 27, 2004	Anderson Mesa	LONEOS	EUN	2.0 km	MPC · JPL
180627	2004 FD_{137}	—	March 28, 2004	Anderson Mesa	LONEOS	·	3.1 km	MPC · JPL
180628	2004 FE_{137}	—	March 28, 2004	Catalina	CSS	·	3.2 km	MPC · JPL
180629	2004 FY_{139}	—	March 26, 2004	Socorro	LINEAR	·	2.5 km	MPC · JPL
180630	2004 FQ_{141}	—	March 27, 2004	Socorro	LINEAR	·	2.5 km	MPC · JPL
180631	2004 FF_{148}	—	March 19, 2004	Socorro	LINEAR	EUN	2.5 km	MPC · JPL
180632	2004 FG_{160}	—	March 18, 2004	Socorro	LINEAR	EUN	2.3 km	MPC · JPL
180633	2004 FL_{160}	—	March 18, 2004	Socorro	LINEAR	·	1.3 km	MPC · JPL
180634	2004 FG_{161}	—	March 18, 2004	Kitt Peak	Spacewatch	·	2.2 km	MPC · JPL
180635	2004 FG_{165}	—	March 27, 2004	Socorro	LINEAR	·	2.1 km	MPC · JPL
180636	2004 GG_{4}	—	April 11, 2004	Palomar	NEAT	·	1.7 km	MPC · JPL
180637	2004 GC_{5}	—	April 11, 2004	Palomar	NEAT	·	2.1 km	MPC · JPL
180638	2004 GK_{7}	—	April 12, 2004	Kitt Peak	Spacewatch	·	2.0 km	MPC · JPL
180639	2004 GQ_{9}	—	April 12, 2004	Kitt Peak	Spacewatch	·	2.7 km	MPC · JPL
180640	2004 GJ_{14}	—	April 13, 2004	Catalina	CSS	·	2.3 km	MPC · JPL
180641	2004 GL_{14}	—	April 13, 2004	Kitt Peak	Spacewatch	·	3.0 km	MPC · JPL
180642	2004 GY_{17}	—	April 12, 2004	Kitt Peak	Spacewatch	·	2.5 km	MPC · JPL
180643 Cardoen	2004 GK_{20}	Cardoen	April 14, 2004	Vicques	M. Ory	·	1.5 km	MPC · JPL
180644	2004 GO_{22}	—	April 12, 2004	Palomar	NEAT	MAR	1.6 km	MPC · JPL
180645	2004 GD_{23}	—	April 12, 2004	Kitt Peak	Spacewatch	·	2.7 km	MPC · JPL
180646	2004 GE_{26}	—	April 14, 2004	Kitt Peak	Spacewatch	·	2.2 km	MPC · JPL
180647	2004 GQ_{27}	—	April 15, 2004	Palomar	NEAT	·	3.5 km	MPC · JPL
180648	2004 GY_{29}	—	April 12, 2004	Kitt Peak	Spacewatch	EUN	2.4 km	MPC · JPL
180649	2004 GK_{30}	—	April 12, 2004	Kitt Peak	Spacewatch	·	2.6 km	MPC · JPL
180650	2004 GK_{32}	—	April 12, 2004	Palomar	NEAT	·	2.5 km	MPC · JPL
180651	2004 GT_{33}	—	April 12, 2004	Kitt Peak	Spacewatch	·	4.5 km	MPC · JPL
180652	2004 GE_{34}	—	April 12, 2004	Siding Spring	SSS	ADE	4.5 km	MPC · JPL
180653	2004 GR_{34}	—	April 13, 2004	Kitt Peak	Spacewatch	·	2.2 km	MPC · JPL
180654	2004 GZ_{34}	—	April 13, 2004	Palomar	NEAT	·	3.2 km	MPC · JPL
180655	2004 GP_{35}	—	April 13, 2004	Palomar	NEAT	·	2.1 km	MPC · JPL
180656	2004 GH_{36}	—	April 13, 2004	Palomar	NEAT	·	2.6 km	MPC · JPL
180657	2004 GL_{36}	—	April 13, 2004	Palomar	NEAT	·	2.1 km	MPC · JPL
180658	2004 GF_{40}	—	April 11, 2004	Palomar	NEAT	DOR	4.2 km	MPC · JPL
180659	2004 GL_{41}	—	April 13, 2004	Palomar	NEAT	·	3.3 km	MPC · JPL
180660	2004 GQ_{42}	—	April 15, 2004	Catalina	CSS	EUN	2.3 km	MPC · JPL
180661	2004 GB_{43}	—	April 15, 2004	Palomar	NEAT	·	2.6 km	MPC · JPL
180662	2004 GQ_{46}	—	April 12, 2004	Kitt Peak	Spacewatch	·	2.2 km	MPC · JPL
180663	2004 GW_{46}	—	April 12, 2004	Kitt Peak	Spacewatch	AGN	1.3 km	MPC · JPL
180664	2004 GD_{60}	—	April 14, 2004	Kitt Peak	Spacewatch	·	3.1 km	MPC · JPL
180665	2004 GF_{60}	—	April 14, 2004	Kitt Peak	Spacewatch	·	3.3 km	MPC · JPL
180666	2004 GC_{61}	—	April 15, 2004	Anderson Mesa	LONEOS	·	3.6 km	MPC · JPL
180667	2004 GW_{63}	—	April 13, 2004	Kitt Peak	Spacewatch	·	1.5 km	MPC · JPL
180668	2004 GG_{65}	—	April 13, 2004	Kitt Peak	Spacewatch	·	2.0 km	MPC · JPL
180669	2004 GQ_{65}	—	April 13, 2004	Kitt Peak	Spacewatch	·	1.7 km	MPC · JPL
180670	2004 GW_{72}	—	April 14, 2004	Kitt Peak	Spacewatch	HOF	4.8 km	MPC · JPL
180671	2004 GX_{72}	—	April 14, 2004	Anderson Mesa	LONEOS	·	3.3 km	MPC · JPL
180672	2004 GC_{74}	—	April 13, 2004	Siding Spring	SSS	·	3.7 km	MPC · JPL
180673	2004 GL_{74}	—	April 15, 2004	Palomar	NEAT	·	2.2 km	MPC · JPL
180674	2004 GW_{76}	—	April 15, 2004	Palomar	NEAT	ADE	2.9 km	MPC · JPL
180675	2004 GK_{77}	—	April 14, 2004	Socorro	LINEAR	(194)	2.8 km	MPC · JPL
180676	2004 GL_{77}	—	April 14, 2004	Socorro	LINEAR	·	1.9 km	MPC · JPL
180677	2004 GL_{79}	—	April 12, 2004	Kitt Peak	Spacewatch	·	3.2 km	MPC · JPL
180678	2004 GZ_{81}	—	April 13, 2004	Catalina	CSS	·	3.7 km	MPC · JPL
180679	2004 GM_{82}	—	April 14, 2004	Kitt Peak	Spacewatch	·	2.3 km	MPC · JPL
180680	2004 GE_{83}	—	April 14, 2004	Kitt Peak	Spacewatch	·	2.0 km	MPC · JPL
180681	2004 GG_{87}	—	April 14, 2004	Siding Spring	SSS	·	3.1 km	MPC · JPL
180682	2004 GK_{87}	—	April 15, 2004	Palomar	NEAT	·	3.0 km	MPC · JPL
180683	2004 HF	—	April 16, 2004	Emerald Lane	L. Ball	·	3.7 km	MPC · JPL
180684	2004 HW_{1}	—	April 20, 2004	Desert Eagle	W. K. Y. Yeung	·	3.2 km	MPC · JPL
180685	2004 HC_{6}	—	April 17, 2004	Socorro	LINEAR	ADE	5.9 km	MPC · JPL
180686	2004 HN_{6}	—	April 17, 2004	Socorro	LINEAR	·	4.1 km	MPC · JPL
180687	2004 HO_{7}	—	April 19, 2004	Socorro	LINEAR	·	1.8 km	MPC · JPL
180688	2004 HN_{10}	—	April 17, 2004	Socorro	LINEAR	AGN	4.0 km	MPC · JPL
180689	2004 HU_{10}	—	April 17, 2004	Anderson Mesa	LONEOS	·	3.4 km	MPC · JPL
180690	2004 HG_{15}	—	April 16, 2004	Kitt Peak	Spacewatch	KOR	1.5 km	MPC · JPL
180691	2004 HH_{19}	—	April 19, 2004	Socorro	LINEAR	·	2.2 km	MPC · JPL
180692	2004 HH_{24}	—	April 16, 2004	Palomar	NEAT	MAR	1.8 km	MPC · JPL
180693	2004 HB_{26}	—	April 19, 2004	Socorro	LINEAR	·	3.6 km	MPC · JPL
180694	2004 HD_{28}	—	April 20, 2004	Socorro	LINEAR	·	2.1 km	MPC · JPL
180695	2004 HA_{31}	—	April 21, 2004	Reedy Creek	J. Broughton	·	5.1 km	MPC · JPL
180696	2004 HO_{31}	—	April 19, 2004	Socorro	LINEAR	(5)	2.2 km	MPC · JPL
180697	2004 HF_{32}	—	April 20, 2004	Kitt Peak	Spacewatch	·	1.4 km	MPC · JPL
180698	2004 HH_{32}	—	April 20, 2004	Kitt Peak	Spacewatch	AEO	1.4 km	MPC · JPL
180699	2004 HZ_{33}	—	April 16, 2004	Socorro	LINEAR	·	3.4 km	MPC · JPL
180700	2004 HA_{44}	—	April 21, 2004	Socorro	LINEAR	·	2.0 km	MPC · JPL

== 180701–180800 ==
back to top

Designation			Discovery			Properties		Ref
Permanent	Provisional	Named after	Date	Site	Discoverer(s)	Category	Diam.	Ref
180701	2004 HQ_{44}	—	April 21, 2004	Socorro	LINEAR	·	2.4 km	MPC · JPL
180702	2004 HX_{45}	—	April 21, 2004	Socorro	LINEAR	·	3.0 km	MPC · JPL
180703	2004 HW_{46}	—	April 22, 2004	Socorro	LINEAR	EUN	2.1 km	MPC · JPL
180704	2004 HM_{48}	—	April 22, 2004	Siding Spring	SSS	EUN	2.0 km	MPC · JPL
180705	2004 HA_{50}	—	April 23, 2004	Kitt Peak	Spacewatch	·	1.7 km	MPC · JPL
180706	2004 HJ_{50}	—	April 23, 2004	Catalina	CSS	·	4.4 km	MPC · JPL
180707	2004 HK_{50}	—	April 23, 2004	Catalina	CSS	·	2.7 km	MPC · JPL
180708	2004 HD_{51}	—	April 23, 2004	Siding Spring	SSS	·	3.6 km	MPC · JPL
180709	2004 HA_{62}	—	April 26, 2004	Kitt Peak	Spacewatch	·	2.7 km	MPC · JPL
180710	2004 HE_{67}	—	April 21, 2004	Kitt Peak	Spacewatch	·	3.5 km	MPC · JPL
180711	2004 HF_{78}	—	April 21, 2004	Kitt Peak	Spacewatch	KOR	1.7 km	MPC · JPL
180712	2004 HL_{78}	—	April 21, 2004	Kitt Peak	Spacewatch	PAD	2.6 km	MPC · JPL
180713	2004 JM_{5}	—	May 10, 2004	Catalina	CSS	TIR	5.3 km	MPC · JPL
180714	2004 JS_{9}	—	May 13, 2004	Kitt Peak	Spacewatch	·	2.4 km	MPC · JPL
180715	2004 JN_{11}	—	May 13, 2004	Anderson Mesa	LONEOS	·	3.2 km	MPC · JPL
180716	2004 JH_{12}	—	May 13, 2004	Palomar	NEAT	EUN	2.0 km	MPC · JPL
180717	2004 JP_{17}	—	May 12, 2004	Siding Spring	SSS	·	2.3 km	MPC · JPL
180718	2004 JD_{20}	—	May 14, 2004	Catalina	CSS	·	2.5 km	MPC · JPL
180719	2004 JR_{21}	—	May 9, 2004	Kitt Peak	Spacewatch	AGN	1.7 km	MPC · JPL
180720	2004 JM_{22}	—	May 9, 2004	Kitt Peak	Spacewatch	·	5.0 km	MPC · JPL
180721	2004 JV_{22}	—	May 10, 2004	Haleakala	NEAT	·	2.2 km	MPC · JPL
180722	2004 JC_{24}	—	May 15, 2004	Socorro	LINEAR	·	2.2 km	MPC · JPL
180723	2004 JG_{25}	—	May 15, 2004	Socorro	LINEAR	·	4.2 km	MPC · JPL
180724	2004 JU_{25}	—	May 15, 2004	Socorro	LINEAR	·	2.3 km	MPC · JPL
180725	2004 JA_{26}	—	May 15, 2004	Socorro	LINEAR	·	2.7 km	MPC · JPL
180726	2004 JM_{26}	—	May 15, 2004	Socorro	LINEAR	·	2.5 km	MPC · JPL
180727	2004 JT_{26}	—	May 15, 2004	Socorro	LINEAR	AEO	1.6 km	MPC · JPL
180728	2004 JM_{27}	—	May 15, 2004	Socorro	LINEAR	·	4.3 km	MPC · JPL
180729	2004 JE_{32}	—	May 13, 2004	Anderson Mesa	LONEOS	·	3.7 km	MPC · JPL
180730	2004 JG_{33}	—	May 15, 2004	Socorro	LINEAR	EUN	1.6 km	MPC · JPL
180731	2004 JW_{35}	—	May 13, 2004	Wrightwood	J. W. Young	HOF	3.8 km	MPC · JPL
180732	2004 JU_{40}	—	May 14, 2004	Kitt Peak	Spacewatch	·	3.1 km	MPC · JPL
180733	2004 JH_{42}	—	May 15, 2004	Needville	Garossino, P. G. A.	·	2.3 km	MPC · JPL
180734	2004 JE_{44}	—	May 12, 2004	Anderson Mesa	LONEOS	·	5.0 km	MPC · JPL
180735	2004 JF_{44}	—	May 12, 2004	Anderson Mesa	LONEOS	·	2.3 km	MPC · JPL
180736	2004 JG_{45}	—	May 12, 2004	Goodricke-Pigott	Goodricke-Pigott	·	2.7 km	MPC · JPL
180737	2004 JH_{55}	—	May 10, 2004	Kitt Peak	Spacewatch	·	1.9 km	MPC · JPL
180738	2004 KW_{3}	—	May 16, 2004	Socorro	LINEAR	·	2.6 km	MPC · JPL
180739 Barbet	2004 KX_{7}	Barbet	May 19, 2004	Saint-Sulpice	B. Christophe	·	3.1 km	MPC · JPL
180740	2004 KB_{14}	—	May 22, 2004	Catalina	CSS	·	2.7 km	MPC · JPL
180741	2004 KL_{16}	—	May 27, 2004	Nogales	Tenagra II	·	2.4 km	MPC · JPL
180742	2004 LL_{2}	—	June 6, 2004	Catalina	CSS	·	3.9 km	MPC · JPL
180743	2004 LR_{3}	—	June 11, 2004	Palomar	NEAT	·	2.3 km	MPC · JPL
180744	2004 LM_{4}	—	June 11, 2004	Socorro	LINEAR	·	2.2 km	MPC · JPL
180745	2004 LK_{7}	—	June 11, 2004	Socorro	LINEAR	·	3.0 km	MPC · JPL
180746	2004 LA_{11}	—	June 10, 2004	Campo Imperatore	CINEOS	HYG	2.8 km	MPC · JPL
180747	2004 LU_{14}	—	June 11, 2004	Kitt Peak	Spacewatch	·	3.0 km	MPC · JPL
180748	2004 LB_{16}	—	June 12, 2004	Socorro	LINEAR	JUN	1.5 km	MPC · JPL
180749	2004 LT_{16}	—	June 14, 2004	Socorro	LINEAR	·	5.7 km	MPC · JPL
180750	2004 LG_{21}	—	June 12, 2004	Socorro	LINEAR	·	2.5 km	MPC · JPL
180751	2004 LR_{26}	—	June 12, 2004	Socorro	LINEAR	·	3.0 km	MPC · JPL
180752	2004 NF	—	July 8, 2004	Reedy Creek	J. Broughton	·	3.2 km	MPC · JPL
180753	2004 NY_{14}	—	July 11, 2004	Socorro	LINEAR	·	3.7 km	MPC · JPL
180754	2004 NK_{27}	—	July 11, 2004	Socorro	LINEAR	HYG	3.1 km	MPC · JPL
180755	2004 NC_{29}	—	July 14, 2004	Socorro	LINEAR	·	5.1 km	MPC · JPL
180756	2004 NF_{30}	—	July 15, 2004	Siding Spring	SSS	H	760 m	MPC · JPL
180757	2004 NE_{33}	—	July 14, 2004	Siding Spring	SSS	T_{j} (2.99)	6.0 km	MPC · JPL
180758	2004 OF_{2}	—	July 16, 2004	Socorro	LINEAR	DOR	3.2 km	MPC · JPL
180759	2004 OQ_{5}	—	July 18, 2004	Socorro	LINEAR	·	4.6 km	MPC · JPL
180760	2004 OV_{5}	—	July 18, 2004	Reedy Creek	J. Broughton	·	3.6 km	MPC · JPL
180761	2004 OK_{6}	—	July 16, 2004	Socorro	LINEAR	·	2.8 km	MPC · JPL
180762	2004 PC_{14}	—	August 7, 2004	Palomar	NEAT	THM	3.3 km	MPC · JPL
180763	2004 PA_{15}	—	August 7, 2004	Palomar	NEAT	·	5.4 km	MPC · JPL
180764	2004 PO_{16}	—	August 7, 2004	Palomar	NEAT	·	5.3 km	MPC · JPL
180765	2004 PJ_{18}	—	August 8, 2004	Anderson Mesa	LONEOS	·	2.8 km	MPC · JPL
180766	2004 PN_{22}	—	August 8, 2004	Socorro	LINEAR	·	3.0 km	MPC · JPL
180767	2004 PC_{36}	—	August 8, 2004	Campo Imperatore	CINEOS	·	3.2 km	MPC · JPL
180768	2004 PK_{54}	—	August 8, 2004	Anderson Mesa	LONEOS	HYG	5.4 km	MPC · JPL
180769	2004 PE_{58}	—	August 9, 2004	Socorro	LINEAR	·	6.2 km	MPC · JPL
180770	2004 PQ_{63}	—	August 10, 2004	Socorro	LINEAR	THM	3.0 km	MPC · JPL
180771	2004 PZ_{73}	—	August 8, 2004	Socorro	LINEAR	·	6.7 km	MPC · JPL
180772	2004 PZ_{81}	—	August 10, 2004	Anderson Mesa	LONEOS	·	5.6 km	MPC · JPL
180773	2004 PB_{105}	—	August 12, 2004	Palomar	NEAT	LIX	6.7 km	MPC · JPL
180774	2004 QB_{1}	—	August 17, 2004	Socorro	LINEAR	H	1.1 km	MPC · JPL
180775	2004 QP_{8}	—	August 16, 2004	Siding Spring	SSS	·	7.3 km	MPC · JPL
180776	2004 QY_{10}	—	August 21, 2004	Siding Spring	SSS	LIX	6.5 km	MPC · JPL
180777	2004 QU_{25}	—	August 27, 2004	Anderson Mesa	LONEOS	·	5.0 km	MPC · JPL
180778	2004 RN_{16}	—	September 7, 2004	Socorro	LINEAR	·	3.0 km	MPC · JPL
180779	2004 RZ_{30}	—	September 7, 2004	Socorro	LINEAR	·	5.7 km	MPC · JPL
180780	2004 RY_{48}	—	September 8, 2004	Socorro	LINEAR	THM	4.9 km	MPC · JPL
180781	2004 RU_{54}	—	September 8, 2004	Socorro	LINEAR	·	3.9 km	MPC · JPL
180782	2004 RH_{139}	—	September 8, 2004	Socorro	LINEAR	THM	3.0 km	MPC · JPL
180783	2004 RK_{146}	—	September 9, 2004	Socorro	LINEAR	·	3.8 km	MPC · JPL
180784	2004 RB_{152}	—	September 10, 2004	Socorro	LINEAR	·	4.6 km	MPC · JPL
180785	2004 RE_{152}	—	September 10, 2004	Socorro	LINEAR	·	5.8 km	MPC · JPL
180786	2004 RO_{182}	—	September 10, 2004	Socorro	LINEAR	HYG	4.4 km	MPC · JPL
180787	2004 RY_{189}	—	September 10, 2004	Socorro	LINEAR	(5931)	5.8 km	MPC · JPL
180788	2004 RF_{195}	—	September 10, 2004	Socorro	LINEAR	CYB	5.4 km	MPC · JPL
180789	2004 RU_{216}	—	September 11, 2004	Socorro	LINEAR	·	6.9 km	MPC · JPL
180790	2004 SX_{9}	—	September 16, 2004	Siding Spring	SSS	HYG	4.7 km	MPC · JPL
180791	2004 SO_{18}	—	September 18, 2004	Socorro	LINEAR	·	6.4 km	MPC · JPL
180792	2004 TZ_{338}	—	October 12, 2004	Anderson Mesa	LONEOS	H	990 m	MPC · JPL
180793	2004 XL_{23}	—	December 8, 2004	Socorro	LINEAR	H · slow	1.3 km	MPC · JPL
180794	2004 XD_{101}	—	December 14, 2004	Socorro	LINEAR	·	1.9 km	MPC · JPL
180795	2004 YT_{4}	—	December 17, 2004	Anderson Mesa	LONEOS	H	860 m	MPC · JPL
180796	2005 CB_{69}	—	February 14, 2005	La Silla	A. Boattini, H. Scholl	·	1.3 km	MPC · JPL
180797	2005 EM_{7}	—	March 1, 2005	Kitt Peak	Spacewatch	·	820 m	MPC · JPL
180798	2005 EP_{23}	—	March 3, 2005	Catalina	CSS	·	940 m	MPC · JPL
180799	2005 EZ_{34}	—	March 3, 2005	Kitt Peak	Spacewatch	·	1.1 km	MPC · JPL
180800	2005 ER_{64}	—	March 4, 2005	Mount Lemmon	Mount Lemmon Survey	·	980 m	MPC · JPL

== 180801–180900 ==
back to top

Designation			Discovery			Properties		Ref
Permanent	Provisional	Named after	Date	Site	Discoverer(s)	Category	Diam.	Ref
180801	2005 ET_{99}	—	March 3, 2005	Catalina	CSS	·	1.5 km	MPC · JPL
180802	2005 EL_{101}	—	March 3, 2005	Kitt Peak	Spacewatch	·	1.3 km	MPC · JPL
180803	2005 EN_{117}	—	March 4, 2005	Mount Lemmon	Mount Lemmon Survey	·	1.4 km	MPC · JPL
180804	2005 ET_{117}	—	March 4, 2005	Mount Lemmon	Mount Lemmon Survey	·	940 m	MPC · JPL
180805	2005 EL_{148}	—	March 10, 2005	Kitt Peak	Spacewatch	·	1.3 km	MPC · JPL
180806	2005 EB_{151}	—	March 10, 2005	Kitt Peak	Spacewatch	·	870 m	MPC · JPL
180807	2005 EG_{164}	—	March 10, 2005	Mount Lemmon	Mount Lemmon Survey	·	1.1 km	MPC · JPL
180808	2005 EU_{168}	—	March 11, 2005	Mount Lemmon	Mount Lemmon Survey	·	960 m	MPC · JPL
180809	2005 EG_{179}	—	March 9, 2005	Kitt Peak	Spacewatch	·	900 m	MPC · JPL
180810	2005 EK_{206}	—	March 13, 2005	Catalina	CSS	·	1.3 km	MPC · JPL
180811	2005 ET_{206}	—	March 13, 2005	Kitt Peak	Spacewatch	·	1.4 km	MPC · JPL
180812	2005 EB_{211}	—	March 4, 2005	Catalina	CSS	·	1.1 km	MPC · JPL
180813	2005 EE_{239}	—	March 11, 2005	Kitt Peak	Spacewatch	·	2.4 km	MPC · JPL
180814	2005 EU_{268}	—	March 14, 2005	Mount Lemmon	Mount Lemmon Survey	·	1.0 km	MPC · JPL
180815	2005 EB_{277}	—	March 8, 2005	Mount Lemmon	Mount Lemmon Survey	·	1.5 km	MPC · JPL
180816	2005 EO_{280}	—	March 10, 2005	Catalina	CSS	·	3.4 km	MPC · JPL
180817	2005 EG_{324}	—	March 8, 2005	Mount Lemmon	Mount Lemmon Survey	·	570 m	MPC · JPL
180818	2005 FH_{4}	—	March 30, 2005	Catalina	CSS	·	1.3 km	MPC · JPL
180819	2005 FP_{6}	—	March 30, 2005	Catalina	CSS	·	970 m	MPC · JPL
180820	2005 FH_{11}	—	March 17, 2005	Kitt Peak	Spacewatch	·	1.4 km	MPC · JPL
180821	2005 GZ_{3}	—	April 1, 2005	Kitt Peak	Spacewatch	V	1.0 km	MPC · JPL
180822	2005 GO_{4}	—	April 1, 2005	Kitt Peak	Spacewatch	·	2.1 km	MPC · JPL
180823	2005 GB_{5}	—	April 1, 2005	Kitt Peak	Spacewatch	·	910 m	MPC · JPL
180824 Kabos	2005 GU_{8}	Kabos	April 2, 2005	Piszkéstető	K. Sárneczky	·	950 m	MPC · JPL
180825	2005 GS_{9}	—	April 2, 2005	Siding Spring	R. H. McNaught	PHO	1.6 km	MPC · JPL
180826	2005 GP_{19}	—	April 2, 2005	Mount Lemmon	Mount Lemmon Survey	·	830 m	MPC · JPL
180827	2005 GV_{26}	—	April 2, 2005	Anderson Mesa	LONEOS	·	1.1 km	MPC · JPL
180828	2005 GG_{38}	—	April 3, 2005	Palomar	NEAT	·	990 m	MPC · JPL
180829	2005 GK_{43}	—	April 5, 2005	Palomar	NEAT	·	1.3 km	MPC · JPL
180830	2005 GT_{43}	—	April 5, 2005	Anderson Mesa	LONEOS	·	990 m	MPC · JPL
180831	2005 GO_{46}	—	April 5, 2005	Mount Lemmon	Mount Lemmon Survey	V	720 m	MPC · JPL
180832	2005 GP_{46}	—	April 5, 2005	Mount Lemmon	Mount Lemmon Survey	MAS	1.2 km	MPC · JPL
180833	2005 GP_{53}	—	April 2, 2005	Mount Lemmon	Mount Lemmon Survey	·	1.5 km	MPC · JPL
180834	2005 GC_{58}	—	April 6, 2005	Mount Lemmon	Mount Lemmon Survey	·	910 m	MPC · JPL
180835	2005 GX_{60}	—	April 9, 2005	RAS	Lowe, A.	·	2.0 km	MPC · JPL
180836	2005 GG_{68}	—	April 2, 2005	Mount Lemmon	Mount Lemmon Survey	·	1.2 km	MPC · JPL
180837	2005 GZ_{72}	—	April 4, 2005	Catalina	CSS	·	1.2 km	MPC · JPL
180838	2005 GG_{76}	—	April 5, 2005	Catalina	CSS	·	1.2 km	MPC · JPL
180839	2005 GE_{80}	—	April 7, 2005	Kitt Peak	Spacewatch	·	1.2 km	MPC · JPL
180840	2005 GM_{86}	—	April 4, 2005	Socorro	LINEAR	·	1.1 km	MPC · JPL
180841	2005 GH_{88}	—	April 5, 2005	Catalina	CSS	·	1.3 km	MPC · JPL
180842	2005 GN_{93}	—	April 6, 2005	Kitt Peak	Spacewatch	·	1.3 km	MPC · JPL
180843	2005 GR_{107}	—	April 10, 2005	Mount Lemmon	Mount Lemmon Survey	·	960 m	MPC · JPL
180844	2005 GX_{113}	—	April 9, 2005	Socorro	LINEAR	·	1.7 km	MPC · JPL
180845	2005 GG_{114}	—	April 10, 2005	Mount Lemmon	Mount Lemmon Survey	·	1.0 km	MPC · JPL
180846	2005 GE_{133}	—	April 10, 2005	Kitt Peak	Spacewatch	·	1.2 km	MPC · JPL
180847	2005 GM_{136}	—	April 10, 2005	Kitt Peak	Spacewatch	(883)	1.1 km	MPC · JPL
180848	2005 GV_{152}	—	April 13, 2005	Anderson Mesa	LONEOS	·	850 m	MPC · JPL
180849	2005 GX_{152}	—	April 13, 2005	Anderson Mesa	LONEOS	V	810 m	MPC · JPL
180850	2005 GX_{160}	—	April 13, 2005	Anderson Mesa	LONEOS	·	1.0 km	MPC · JPL
180851	2005 GZ_{161}	—	April 14, 2005	Catalina	CSS	·	1.4 km	MPC · JPL
180852	2005 GA_{167}	—	April 11, 2005	Mount Lemmon	Mount Lemmon Survey	·	1.4 km	MPC · JPL
180853	2005 GR_{167}	—	April 11, 2005	Mount Lemmon	Mount Lemmon Survey	·	720 m	MPC · JPL
180854	2005 GF_{169}	—	April 12, 2005	Kitt Peak	Spacewatch	·	950 m	MPC · JPL
180855 Debrarose	2005 GO_{205}	Debrarose	April 11, 2005	Kitt Peak	M. W. Buie	·	1.1 km	MPC · JPL
180856	2005 HX_{5}	—	April 30, 2005	Kitt Peak	Spacewatch	·	1.6 km	MPC · JPL
180857 Hofigéza	2005 HG_{7}	Hofigéza	April 28, 2005	Piszkéstető	K. Sárneczky	·	1.1 km	MPC · JPL
180858	2005 HX_{7}	—	April 30, 2005	Palomar	NEAT	·	1.9 km	MPC · JPL
180859	2005 JA_{17}	—	May 4, 2005	Palomar	NEAT	·	1.2 km	MPC · JPL
180860	2005 JR_{19}	—	May 4, 2005	Socorro	LINEAR	·	1.2 km	MPC · JPL
180861	2005 JS_{22}	—	May 1, 2005	Palomar	NEAT	(2076)	1.3 km	MPC · JPL
180862	2005 JM_{26}	—	May 3, 2005	Kitt Peak	Spacewatch	V	1.0 km	MPC · JPL
180863	2005 JE_{27}	—	May 3, 2005	Kitt Peak	Spacewatch	·	1.6 km	MPC · JPL
180864	2005 JL_{27}	—	May 3, 2005	Socorro	LINEAR	·	1.9 km	MPC · JPL
180865	2005 JW_{28}	—	May 3, 2005	Kitt Peak	Spacewatch	·	900 m	MPC · JPL
180866	2005 JC_{35}	—	May 4, 2005	Kitt Peak	Spacewatch	·	1.1 km	MPC · JPL
180867	2005 JO_{41}	—	May 7, 2005	Mount Lemmon	Mount Lemmon Survey	·	1.7 km	MPC · JPL
180868	2005 JP_{42}	—	May 8, 2005	Anderson Mesa	LONEOS	·	1.0 km	MPC · JPL
180869	2005 JZ_{42}	—	May 8, 2005	Socorro	LINEAR	·	950 m	MPC · JPL
180870	2005 JR_{44}	—	May 8, 2005	Mount Lemmon	Mount Lemmon Survey	MAS	1.0 km	MPC · JPL
180871	2005 JS_{54}	—	May 4, 2005	Mount Lemmon	Mount Lemmon Survey	MAS	870 m	MPC · JPL
180872	2005 JQ_{74}	—	May 8, 2005	Mount Lemmon	Mount Lemmon Survey	·	940 m	MPC · JPL
180873	2005 JZ_{74}	—	May 8, 2005	Siding Spring	SSS	·	1.8 km	MPC · JPL
180874	2005 JW_{81}	—	May 3, 2005	Kitt Peak	Spacewatch	V	870 m	MPC · JPL
180875	2005 JR_{84}	—	May 8, 2005	Catalina	CSS	·	1.2 km	MPC · JPL
180876	2005 JU_{88}	—	May 10, 2005	Kitt Peak	Spacewatch	·	1.7 km	MPC · JPL
180877	2005 JF_{90}	—	May 11, 2005	Mount Lemmon	Mount Lemmon Survey	·	2.5 km	MPC · JPL
180878	2005 JQ_{91}	—	May 10, 2005	Mount Lemmon	Mount Lemmon Survey	·	1.1 km	MPC · JPL
180879	2005 JU_{93}	—	May 11, 2005	Palomar	NEAT	NYS	1.7 km	MPC · JPL
180880	2005 JN_{101}	—	May 9, 2005	Mount Lemmon	Mount Lemmon Survey	·	910 m	MPC · JPL
180881	2005 JK_{104}	—	May 10, 2005	Mount Lemmon	Mount Lemmon Survey	·	960 m	MPC · JPL
180882	2005 JU_{111}	—	May 9, 2005	Anderson Mesa	LONEOS	·	980 m	MPC · JPL
180883	2005 JQ_{112}	—	May 9, 2005	Catalina	CSS	·	2.1 km	MPC · JPL
180884	2005 JG_{117}	—	May 10, 2005	Kitt Peak	Spacewatch	·	1.8 km	MPC · JPL
180885	2005 JX_{122}	—	May 11, 2005	Kitt Peak	Spacewatch	·	990 m	MPC · JPL
180886	2005 JZ_{122}	—	May 11, 2005	Kitt Peak	Spacewatch	·	1.6 km	MPC · JPL
180887	2005 JY_{124}	—	May 11, 2005	Kitt Peak	Spacewatch	EUN	3.6 km	MPC · JPL
180888	2005 JW_{125}	—	May 11, 2005	Palomar	NEAT	·	1.5 km	MPC · JPL
180889	2005 JR_{133}	—	May 14, 2005	Kitt Peak	Spacewatch	·	1.7 km	MPC · JPL
180890	2005 JL_{135}	—	May 15, 2005	Mount Lemmon	Mount Lemmon Survey	·	1.3 km	MPC · JPL
180891	2005 JL_{137}	—	May 13, 2005	Kitt Peak	Spacewatch	NYS	1.4 km	MPC · JPL
180892	2005 JZ_{144}	—	May 15, 2005	Mount Lemmon	Mount Lemmon Survey	·	1.8 km	MPC · JPL
180893	2005 JU_{146}	—	May 14, 2005	Kitt Peak	Spacewatch	EUN	1.9 km	MPC · JPL
180894	2005 JV_{149}	—	May 3, 2005	Kitt Peak	Spacewatch	V	750 m	MPC · JPL
180895	2005 JQ_{156}	—	May 4, 2005	Palomar	NEAT	·	1.6 km	MPC · JPL
180896	2005 JP_{160}	—	May 8, 2005	Anderson Mesa	LONEOS	·	1.3 km	MPC · JPL
180897	2005 JC_{161}	—	May 8, 2005	Kitt Peak	Spacewatch	·	1.5 km	MPC · JPL
180898	2005 JQ_{162}	—	May 8, 2005	Kitt Peak	Spacewatch	·	1.2 km	MPC · JPL
180899	2005 JC_{163}	—	May 8, 2005	Mount Lemmon	Mount Lemmon Survey	·	1.1 km	MPC · JPL
180900	2005 JD_{165}	—	May 10, 2005	Mount Lemmon	Mount Lemmon Survey	MAS	930 m	MPC · JPL

== 180901–181000 ==
back to top

Designation			Discovery			Properties		Ref
Permanent	Provisional	Named after	Date	Site	Discoverer(s)	Category	Diam.	Ref
180901	2005 JL_{167}	—	May 12, 2005	Socorro	LINEAR	·	1.3 km	MPC · JPL
180902	2005 JX_{167}	—	May 13, 2005	Mount Lemmon	Mount Lemmon Survey	·	1.6 km	MPC · JPL
180903	2005 JW_{178}	—	May 13, 2005	Kitt Peak	Spacewatch	·	5.2 km	MPC · JPL
180904	2005 JG_{179}	—	May 14, 2005	Palomar	NEAT	·	920 m	MPC · JPL
180905	2005 JU_{181}	—	May 1, 2005	Palomar	NEAT	·	1.1 km	MPC · JPL
180906	2005 KB_{6}	—	May 18, 2005	Palomar	NEAT	·	900 m	MPC · JPL
180907	2005 KW_{7}	—	May 20, 2005	Mount Lemmon	Mount Lemmon Survey	·	890 m	MPC · JPL
180908	2005 KT_{8}	—	May 16, 2005	Mount Lemmon	Mount Lemmon Survey	·	990 m	MPC · JPL
180909	2005 KA_{10}	—	May 30, 2005	Reedy Creek	J. Broughton	·	990 m	MPC · JPL
180910	2005 KB_{11}	—	May 31, 2005	Reedy Creek	J. Broughton	·	1.6 km	MPC · JPL
180911	2005 KN_{11}	—	May 30, 2005	Siding Spring	SSS	·	2.0 km	MPC · JPL
180912	2005 LY_{2}	—	June 2, 2005	Catalina	CSS	·	1.1 km	MPC · JPL
180913	2005 LD_{4}	—	June 1, 2005	Kitt Peak	Spacewatch	·	1.8 km	MPC · JPL
180914	2005 LM_{5}	—	June 2, 2005	Siding Spring	SSS	·	2.2 km	MPC · JPL
180915	2005 LO_{5}	—	June 2, 2005	Siding Spring	SSS	·	1.2 km	MPC · JPL
180916	2005 LU_{9}	—	June 1, 2005	Kitt Peak	Spacewatch	·	1.2 km	MPC · JPL
180917	2005 LZ_{9}	—	June 2, 2005	Siding Spring	SSS	·	2.6 km	MPC · JPL
180918	2005 LJ_{11}	—	June 3, 2005	Kitt Peak	Spacewatch	V	1.1 km	MPC · JPL
180919	2005 LU_{14}	—	June 5, 2005	Kitt Peak	Spacewatch	·	1.9 km	MPC · JPL
180920	2005 LN_{16}	—	June 5, 2005	Kitt Peak	Spacewatch	·	2.1 km	MPC · JPL
180921	2005 LV_{16}	—	June 6, 2005	Kitt Peak	Spacewatch	V	870 m	MPC · JPL
180922	2005 LY_{16}	—	June 6, 2005	Kitt Peak	Spacewatch	(5)	2.7 km	MPC · JPL
180923	2005 LG_{17}	—	June 6, 2005	Kitt Peak	Spacewatch	·	1.5 km	MPC · JPL
180924	2005 LH_{17}	—	June 6, 2005	Kitt Peak	Spacewatch	·	1.1 km	MPC · JPL
180925	2005 LY_{23}	—	June 3, 2005	Siding Spring	SSS	PHO	1.5 km	MPC · JPL
180926	2005 LD_{24}	—	June 11, 2005	Junk Bond	Junk Bond	·	2.4 km	MPC · JPL
180927	2005 LX_{24}	—	June 7, 2005	Catalina	CSS	·	2.2 km	MPC · JPL
180928	2005 LX_{26}	—	June 8, 2005	Kitt Peak	Spacewatch	·	1.5 km	MPC · JPL
180929	2005 LG_{27}	—	June 9, 2005	Kitt Peak	Spacewatch	·	1.0 km	MPC · JPL
180930	2005 LS_{30}	—	June 12, 2005	Kitt Peak	Spacewatch	·	3.7 km	MPC · JPL
180931	2005 LW_{30}	—	June 12, 2005	7300 Observatory	7300	·	1.7 km	MPC · JPL
180932 Luciegreen	2005 LG_{31}	Luciegreen	June 13, 2005	Mount Lemmon	Mount Lemmon Survey	(5)	2.1 km	MPC · JPL
180933	2005 LR_{32}	—	June 9, 2005	Kitt Peak	Spacewatch	·	1.0 km	MPC · JPL
180934	2005 LE_{33}	—	June 10, 2005	Kitt Peak	Spacewatch	·	960 m	MPC · JPL
180935	2005 LP_{38}	—	June 11, 2005	Kitt Peak	Spacewatch	·	1.0 km	MPC · JPL
180936	2005 LM_{40}	—	June 14, 2005	Kitt Peak	Spacewatch	·	1.4 km	MPC · JPL
180937	2005 LM_{41}	—	June 12, 2005	Kitt Peak	Spacewatch	·	1.5 km	MPC · JPL
180938	2005 LH_{45}	—	June 13, 2005	Kitt Peak	Spacewatch	·	700 m	MPC · JPL
180939	2005 LE_{51}	—	June 13, 2005	Mount Lemmon	Mount Lemmon Survey	·	2.0 km	MPC · JPL
180940 Bighornfire	2005 ML_{2}	Bighornfire	June 17, 2005	Mount Lemmon	Mount Lemmon Survey	·	1.5 km	MPC · JPL
180941	2005 MX_{2}	—	June 18, 2005	Mount Lemmon	Mount Lemmon Survey	·	2.3 km	MPC · JPL
180942	2005 MB_{3}	—	June 20, 2005	Palomar	NEAT	·	2.2 km	MPC · JPL
180943	2005 ML_{4}	—	June 17, 2005	Mount Lemmon	Mount Lemmon Survey	·	1.5 km	MPC · JPL
180944	2005 MH_{8}	—	June 27, 2005	Kitt Peak	Spacewatch	·	1.5 km	MPC · JPL
180945	2005 MR_{10}	—	June 27, 2005	Kitt Peak	Spacewatch	·	1.5 km	MPC · JPL
180946	2005 MH_{12}	—	June 28, 2005	Palomar	NEAT	·	2.3 km	MPC · JPL
180947	2005 MQ_{13}	—	June 27, 2005	Junk Bond	D. Healy	NYS	1.6 km	MPC · JPL
180948	2005 MT_{15}	—	June 28, 2005	Mount Lemmon	Mount Lemmon Survey	·	2.1 km	MPC · JPL
180949	2005 MA_{17}	—	June 27, 2005	Kitt Peak	Spacewatch	·	2.4 km	MPC · JPL
180950	2005 MT_{17}	—	June 27, 2005	Kitt Peak	Spacewatch	·	2.4 km	MPC · JPL
180951	2005 MZ_{21}	—	June 30, 2005	Kitt Peak	Spacewatch	NYS	1.6 km	MPC · JPL
180952	2005 ML_{22}	—	June 30, 2005	Kitt Peak	Spacewatch	·	1.4 km	MPC · JPL
180953	2005 MR_{22}	—	June 30, 2005	Kitt Peak	Spacewatch	·	3.5 km	MPC · JPL
180954	2005 MU_{22}	—	June 30, 2005	Kitt Peak	Spacewatch	·	1.3 km	MPC · JPL
180955	2005 MU_{29}	—	June 29, 2005	Kitt Peak	Spacewatch	·	3.2 km	MPC · JPL
180956	2005 MV_{31}	—	June 28, 2005	Palomar	NEAT	MAS	1.1 km	MPC · JPL
180957	2005 MB_{32}	—	June 28, 2005	Palomar	NEAT	NYS	2.5 km	MPC · JPL
180958	2005 MO_{33}	—	June 29, 2005	Kitt Peak	Spacewatch	NYS	1.6 km	MPC · JPL
180959	2005 MJ_{34}	—	June 29, 2005	Palomar	NEAT	·	5.4 km	MPC · JPL
180960	2005 MX_{34}	—	June 29, 2005	Palomar	NEAT	·	3.0 km	MPC · JPL
180961	2005 MJ_{35}	—	June 30, 2005	Kitt Peak	Spacewatch	·	1.5 km	MPC · JPL
180962	2005 MW_{35}	—	June 30, 2005	Kitt Peak	Spacewatch	MAS · slow	1.5 km	MPC · JPL
180963	2005 MK_{36}	—	June 30, 2005	Kitt Peak	Spacewatch	·	1.9 km	MPC · JPL
180964	2005 MS_{36}	—	June 30, 2005	Kitt Peak	Spacewatch	GEF	1.8 km	MPC · JPL
180965	2005 MB_{37}	—	June 30, 2005	Kitt Peak	Spacewatch	KOR	1.6 km	MPC · JPL
180966	2005 MH_{37}	—	June 30, 2005	Kitt Peak	Spacewatch	·	2.5 km	MPC · JPL
180967	2005 MJ_{37}	—	June 30, 2005	Kitt Peak	Spacewatch	KOR	1.5 km	MPC · JPL
180968	2005 MX_{37}	—	June 30, 2005	Palomar	NEAT	WIT	1.4 km	MPC · JPL
180969	2005 MM_{39}	—	June 29, 2005	Kitt Peak	Spacewatch	PAD	2.9 km	MPC · JPL
180970	2005 MN_{39}	—	June 29, 2005	Palomar	NEAT	·	2.9 km	MPC · JPL
180971	2005 MX_{39}	—	June 29, 2005	Palomar	NEAT	·	1.5 km	MPC · JPL
180972	2005 MB_{42}	—	June 28, 2005	Palomar	NEAT	·	1.7 km	MPC · JPL
180973	2005 MS_{46}	—	June 28, 2005	Palomar	NEAT	·	1.4 km	MPC · JPL
180974	2005 MB_{47}	—	June 28, 2005	Palomar	NEAT	·	4.2 km	MPC · JPL
180975	2005 MM_{48}	—	June 29, 2005	Kitt Peak	Spacewatch	EOS	2.7 km	MPC · JPL
180976	2005 MU_{49}	—	June 30, 2005	Kitt Peak	Spacewatch	·	1.9 km	MPC · JPL
180977	2005 NB_{1}	—	July 4, 2005	RAS	Lowe, A.	DOR	3.6 km	MPC · JPL
180978	2005 NZ_{5}	—	July 4, 2005	Kitt Peak	Spacewatch	·	3.9 km	MPC · JPL
180979	2005 NW_{7}	—	July 1, 2005	Kitt Peak	Spacewatch	·	2.3 km	MPC · JPL
180980	2005 NQ_{8}	—	July 1, 2005	Kitt Peak	Spacewatch	·	3.8 km	MPC · JPL
180981	2005 NN_{9}	—	July 1, 2005	Kitt Peak	Spacewatch	·	1.8 km	MPC · JPL
180982	2005 NU_{11}	—	July 4, 2005	Kitt Peak	Spacewatch	·	2.4 km	MPC · JPL
180983	2005 NU_{12}	—	July 4, 2005	Mount Lemmon	Mount Lemmon Survey	·	2.3 km	MPC · JPL
180984	2005 NX_{12}	—	July 4, 2005	Palomar	NEAT	·	3.7 km	MPC · JPL
180985	2005 NC_{13}	—	July 4, 2005	Mount Lemmon	Mount Lemmon Survey	NYS	2.0 km	MPC · JPL
180986	2005 NK_{14}	—	July 5, 2005	Kitt Peak	Spacewatch	·	2.9 km	MPC · JPL
180987	2005 NU_{15}	—	July 2, 2005	Kitt Peak	Spacewatch	·	2.7 km	MPC · JPL
180988	2005 NY_{15}	—	July 2, 2005	Kitt Peak	Spacewatch	·	3.0 km	MPC · JPL
180989	2005 NO_{16}	—	July 2, 2005	Kitt Peak	Spacewatch	·	1.4 km	MPC · JPL
180990	2005 NL_{17}	—	July 3, 2005	Mount Lemmon	Mount Lemmon Survey	·	2.1 km	MPC · JPL
180991	2005 NP_{19}	—	July 5, 2005	Mount Lemmon	Mount Lemmon Survey	KOR	1.6 km	MPC · JPL
180992	2005 NF_{20}	—	July 4, 2005	Socorro	LINEAR	·	2.8 km	MPC · JPL
180993	2005 NQ_{20}	—	July 2, 2005	Reedy Creek	J. Broughton	·	2.3 km	MPC · JPL
180994	2005 NT_{21}	—	July 1, 2005	Kitt Peak	Spacewatch	HOF	3.1 km	MPC · JPL
180995	2005 NG_{22}	—	July 1, 2005	Kitt Peak	Spacewatch	MRX	1.1 km	MPC · JPL
180996	2005 NT_{23}	—	July 4, 2005	Kitt Peak	Spacewatch	·	2.6 km	MPC · JPL
180997	2005 NW_{29}	—	July 3, 2005	Mount Lemmon	Mount Lemmon Survey	·	2.1 km	MPC · JPL
180998	2005 NF_{36}	—	July 5, 2005	Palomar	NEAT	·	4.1 km	MPC · JPL
180999	2005 NE_{39}	—	July 6, 2005	Reedy Creek	J. Broughton	·	1.7 km	MPC · JPL
181000	2005 NH_{39}	—	July 6, 2005	Reedy Creek	J. Broughton	·	1.5 km	MPC · JPL

back to top

== See also ==
- Meanings of minor-planet names: 180001–181000
