= EBI =

Ebi or EBI may refer to:

== People ==
=== Given name or nickname ===
- Ebi (born 1949), Iranian pop singer
- Ebi Dishnica (born 1984), Albanian basketball player
- Ebi Ere (born 1981), American-Nigerian basketball player
- Ebi Smolarek (born 1981), Polish footballer
- Susumu Yokota (died 2015), Japanese musician

=== Surname ===
- Akiko Ebi (born 1953), Japanese pianist
- Ndudi Ebi (born 1984), Nigerian–British basketball player
- Onome Ebi (born 1983), Nigerian footballer

== Places ==
- Ebi Lake, in Xinjiang, China
- Ebi River, in Funabashi, Chiba Prefecture, Japan
- Ebi Station, in Kofu, Tottori Prefecture, Japan

== Education ==
- École de Biologie Industrielle, an engineering school in Cergy, France
- Elim Bible Institute, in Lima, New York, United States
- Evangelical Bible Institute, now the Savannah Christian Preparatory School, in Georgia, United States

== Other uses ==
- Electronic Braking Interface as prefixing part of trade marks by former Bombardier Transportation, now Alstom
- Encyclopædia Britannica, Inc., a publisher
- Energy Biosciences Institute, at the University of California, Berkeley
- European Bioinformatics Institute, of the European Molecular Biology Laboratory
- External Bus Interface, a computer bus
- Extra Beveiligde Inrichting ("Extra Security Institution"), the maximum-security portion of the Dutch Nieuw Vosseveld prison
