= UR G class =

Uganda Railway G (GA) class Kenya-Uganda Railway GA (EB) class
Type and origin
- Power type: Steam
- Builder: Nasmyth, Wilson and Company
- Build date: 1914
- Total produced: 7
Specifications
- Configuration
  - Whyte: 4-8-0
- Gauge: 1,000 mm (3 ft 3 3/8 in)
Career
- Operators: Uganda Railway (UR); → Kenya-Uganda Railway (KUR)
- Class: UR: G class / GA class; KUR: GA class / EB class
- Numbers: 121–127
- Disposition: All scrapped

The UR G class, known later as the UR / KUR GA class, and later still as the KUR EB class, was a class of 1,000 mm (3 ft 3 3/8 in) gauge 4-8-0 steam locomotives built by Nasmyth, Wilson and Company in Patricroft, Salford, England, for the Uganda Railway (UR).

The seven members of the class entered service on the UR in 1914.

In 1920, the East Africa Protectorate became the Kenya Crown Colony and was opened for settlement. The UR soon became hard pressed to keep up with the increased movement of goods and produce. Locomotives in the class were used to address that problem.

The class continued in service after the UR was renamed the Kenya-Uganda Railway (KUR) in 1926.

== See also ==
- Rail transport in Kenya
- Rail transport in Uganda
