= Bazzocchi EB.1 Littore =

EB.1 Littore

General information
- Type: Single seat trainer glider
- National origin: Italy
- Designer: Ermanno Bazzocchi
- Number built: 1

History
- First flight: 1936

The Bazzocchi EB.1 Littore (English: Lictor) was a one off, Italian single seat trainer glider designed and built by a university student in 1936.

== Design and development ==
Ermanno Bazzucchi was a nineteen-year-old student at the Polytechnic University of Milan when he designed and built the EB.1. Friends from the University Fascist Group helped with its funding. It was intended as a simple and low cost single seat trainer glider.

The EB.1 was a high wing braced monoplane with a wooden structure and skinned with a mixture of plywood and fabric. Its wings were built around two spars and were aerodynamically thick; in plan they were unswept and of parallel chord, ending in asymmetrical elliptical tips. Ailerons filled about half the span. Mounted with about 2° of dihedral, they were braced to the fuselage on each side by a parallel pair of faired wooden struts which ran from the bottom of the fuselage to the wings at about one third span.

The EB.1 had a deep sided, hexagonal cross section fuselage, ply covered forward and fabric aft. Its cockpit, immediately ahead of the wing, was open but the pilot was partly sheltered by a long streamlined transparency which photographs show to have been modified at least once. The tail surfaces were elliptical, the fin tall and the rudder extending down to the keel. Its cantilever tailplane, set at mid fuselage, was fabric covered and carried balanced elevators well separated to allow the rudder to move between them. A long, simple sprung skid served as the undercarriage.

The EB.1 first flew in 1936 from a hill near Cantù, elastic rope launched and piloted by Bazzocchi. Only one was built.

== Operational history ==
Bazzocchi flew the EB.1 in the National University Contests (the Littoriali), held at the Cantù site. It later flew at Taliedo and Tradate.

== Specifications ==
Data from Pedrelli (2011) p.201

General characteristics

- Crew: One
- Length: 6.16 m (20 ft 3 in)
- Wingspan: 14.0 m (45 ft 11 in)
- Wing area: 15.20 m^{2} (163.6 sq ft)
- Aspect ratio: 13
- Empty weight: 120 kg (265 lb)
- Gross weight: 200 kg (441 lb)

Performance

- Maximum glide ratio: 18:1 estimated
- Wing loading: 12.50 kg/m^{2} (2.56 lb/sq ft)
