= Hou Yunde =

Chinese virologist and geneticist

- 侯云德
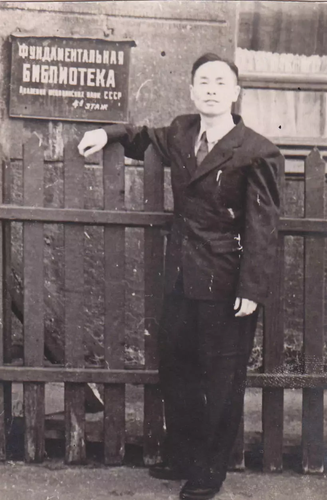
- Hou Yunde at the Soviet Ivanovsky Institute of Virology in 1958
- Born: 13 July 1929 (age 97); Wujin, Jiangsu, Republic of China
- Citizenship: People's Republic of China
- Education: Wuhan Medical School, Ivanovsky Institute of Virology
- Awards: 2017 Highest Science and Technology Award
- Scientific career
- Fields: Medicine; Virology; Genetics; Genetic Engineering
- Workplaces: Vice-president of the Chinese Academy of Engineering; Researcher at the National Institute for Viral Disease Control and Prevention; Director of the National Virus Biotechnology Engineering Center

Hou Yunde (Chinese: 侯云德; born 13 July 1929) is a Chinese virologist, geneticist and a genetic engineer. Considered to have laid the foundation for modern infectious disease prevention and control technology systems in China.

== Biography ==
Hou was born in 1929 in Changzhou, Jiangsu province. From an early age, Hou decided to study medicine, after watching his elder brother die from infectious disease.

In 1958, After graduating from the Wuhan Medical School he studied at the Ivanovsky Institute of Virology in the USSR for 4 years. During his time at the institute, the lab mice mysteriously died. Hou had discovered that they had contracted the Sendai virus. Continuing his research, he discovered that the virus can evolve to affect Humans, and that Sendai virus could fuse monolayer cells. Based on his studies he authored 17 medical papers and earned a Candidate of Sciences (PhD) degree in medical sciences. It was the first time the institute had agreed to award this degree to a foreign student.

Continuing his work in China, Hou researched the etiology of respiratory viral infections to identify and isolate main pathogens of respiratory diseases. He managed to isolate three types of parainfluenza viruses, type I, II and IV, which helped dealing with the disease epidemic outbreaks in Beijing during 1962–1964.

he laid the foundation for China's molecular virus research and created the first Chinese genetically engineered drugs. In late 1970s he established the first domestic clinical-grade human leukocyte interferon production, which earned him the nickname "Father of Chinese Interferon". From 1984 to 1997 he served as the head of planning expert committee on biotechnological field of Program 863. After the restrictions on businesses were relaxed in the 1990s, Hou started one of the first Chinese genetic engineering drug companies.

During the 2009 flu pandemic, Hou, while being over 80, led the Chinese response and prevention to the outbreak. While a vaccine was created, a question arose if one or two doses were required. Chinese companies could not support making the number of vaccines required for two doses and Hou was at the forefront arguing that one dose would be enough. At the end, the committee of experts founded to resolve the issue agreed with his decision.

During his lifetime he authored more than 500 articles and books.

== Awards and honors ==
- Asteroid 181829 Houyunde, discovered by astronomers of the Beijing Schmidt CCD Asteroid Program in 1998, was named in his honor. The official naming citation was published by the Minor Planet Center on 27 August 2019 (M.P.C. 115894).
- Hou Yunde was awarded the 2017 Highest Science and Technology Award.
- Asian Scientist 100, Asian Scientist, 2019
