= Meanings of minor-planet names: 181001–182000 =

As minor planet discoveries are confirmed, they are given a permanent number by the IAU's Minor Planet Center (MPC), and the discoverers can then submit names for them, following the IAU's naming conventions. The list below concerns those minor planets in the specified number-range that have received names, and explains the meanings of those names.

Official naming citations of newly named small Solar System bodies are approved and published in a bulletin by IAU's Working Group for Small Bodies Nomenclature (WGSBN). Before May 2021, citations were published in MPC's Minor Planet Circulars for many decades. Recent citations can also be found on the JPL Small-Body Database (SBDB). Until his death in 2016, German astronomer Lutz D. Schmadel compiled these citations into the Dictionary of Minor Planet Names (DMP) and regularly updated the collection.

Based on Paul Herget's The Names of the Minor Planets, Schmadel also researched the unclear origin of numerous asteroids, most of which had been named prior to World War II. This article incorporates text from this source, which is in the public domain: SBDB New namings may only be added to this list below after official publication as the preannouncement of names is condemned. The WGSBN publishes a comprehensive guideline for the naming rules of non-cometary small Solar System bodies.

== 181001–181100 ==
Named minor planet	Provisional	This minor planet was named for...	Ref · Catalog
181043 Anan	2005 PV	Anan, a city which located in eastern Shikoku Island, Japan	JPL · 181043

== 181101–181200 ==
back to top

Named minor planet	Provisional	This minor planet was named for...	Ref · Catalog
181136 Losonczrita	2005 QA_{152}	Rita Losoncz (born 1985), the fiancée of Krisztián Vida who participated with many observations in the minor planet survey at the Konkoly Observatory in Budapest, Hungary	JPL · 181136

== 181201–181300 ==
back to top

Named minor planet	Provisional	This minor planet was named for...	Ref · Catalog
181241 Dipasquale	2005 UD_{7}	Pietro Di Pasquale (born 1947), a cardiologist at the hospital in Palermo city	JPL · 181241
181249 Tkachenko	2005 UZ_{158}	Viktor Tkachenko (born 1953), former director of the Kyiv Palace of Sports	JPL · 181249
181279 Iapyx	2006 BF_{8}	Iapyx from Greek mythology. He was the son of Iasus and favourite of Apollo, the healer of Aeneas during the Trojan War, and mythological founder of Apulia.	JPL · 181279
181298 Ladányi	2006 QY	Tamás Ladányi (born 1972), a Hungarian amateur astronomer and a member of "The World At Night" group.	JPL · 181298

== 181301–181400 ==
back to top

Named minor planet	Provisional	This minor planet was named for...	Ref · Catalog
181392 Katonajózsef	2006 SY_{77}	József Katona (1791–1830), a Hungarian playwright and poet, lawyer, and the author of the Hungarian historical tragedy Bánk bán.	IAU · 181392

== 181401–181500 ==
back to top

Named minor planet	Provisional	This minor planet was named for...	Ref · Catalog
181419 Dragonera	2006 SN_{218}	Sa Dragonera, a small island in the Balearic Islands, 3.2 km long and 500 meters high.	JPL · 181419
181483 Ampleforth	2006 TA_{95}	Ampleforth, England, home to the Benedictine community of Ampleforth Abbey, to Ampleforth College where the discoverer was educated, and to the churchyard of Our Lady and St. Benedict's where his stepfather is buried	JPL · 181483
181494 Forestale	2006 UJ_{4}	The name is dedicated to the women and men of the Italian State Forestry Corps (1822–2016).	IAU · 181494

== 181501–181600 ==
back to top

Named minor planet	Provisional	This minor planet was named for...	Ref · Catalog
181518 Ursulakleguin	2006 UL_{86}	Ursula Kroeber Le Guin (1929–2018), an American novelist and the author of many books and stories for adults and children. Recipient of numerous literary awards, Le Guin's words will be remembered, worlds will be visited, and characters beloved, for as long as her namesake orbits the Sun.	JPL · 181518
181562 Paulrosendall	2006 UT_{325}	Paul E. Rosendall (born 1984), a senior software engineer at the Johns Hopkins University Applied Physics Laboratory, who served as the Lead for Software Fault Protection for the New Horizons mission to Pluto.	JPL · 181562
181569 Leetyphoon	2006 VD_{21}	Typhoon Lee (born 1948), an isotope geochemist and nuclear astrophysicist who is a member of Taiwan's Academia Sinica	JPL · 181569

== 181601–181700 ==
back to top

Named minor planet	Provisional	This minor planet was named for...	Ref · Catalog
181627 Philgeluck	2006 XZ_{5}	Philippe Geluck (born 1954), a Belgian comedian, humorist and cartoonist, creator of the comic strip Le Chat	JPL · 181627
181661 Alessandro	2007 YO_{47}	Alessandro Foglia (born 1968) is the brother of one of the discoverers. He is a financial manager and a leader of the local Astronomy Club and he has introduced astronomy to young people.	IAU · 181661
181670 Kengyun	2008 BO_{15}	Keng Yun (1924–2000), a master of Zen, who taught others how to understand themselves, and to recognize the laws of universe and reality. He helped others accomplish their completeness and human evolution toward the bliss of lives.	JPL · 181670

== 181701–181800 ==
back to top

Named minor planet	Provisional	This minor planet was named for...	Ref · Catalog
181702 Forcalquier	1988 RC_{9}	Forcalquier, a community in southeastern France. It is located on the foot of the Luberon mountain ranges in the Alpes-de Haute Provence department.	JPL · 181702
181751 Phaenops	1996 HS_{12}	Phaenops from Greek mythology. After hearing that Diomedes had killed both of his sons, Xanthos (Xanthus) and Thouon (Thoön), he was left in bitter grief and anguish.	JPL · 181751

== 181801–181900 ==
back to top

Named minor planet	Provisional	This minor planet was named for...	Ref · Catalog
181824 Königsleiten	1998 SY_{35}	Königsleiten, an Austrian village in the province of Salzburg and part of Wald im Pinzgau	JPL · 181824
181829 Houyunde	1998 SY_{62}	Hou Yunde (born 1929) laid the foundation for modern infectious disease prevention and control technology systems in China. He is an Academician of the Chinese Academy of Engineering. The medical drugs he developed have cured millions of patients. He won the 2017 State Preeminent Science and Technology Award of China.	JPL · 181829
181872 Cathaysa	1999 FL_{90}	Cathaysa was the name of a Guanche aboriginal girl who lived in Tenerife and was sold in Valencia as a slave in 1494, as well as the daughter (born 2005) of the Spanish astronomer David Martinez-Delgado. This name recognizes the Canary Islands' contribution to astronomy.	IAU · 181872

== 181901–182000 ==
back to top

Named minor planet	Provisional	This minor planet was named for...	Ref · Catalog
There are no named minor planets in this number range

back to top

Preceded by 180,001–181,000	Meanings of minor-planet names List of minor planets: 181,001–182,000	Succeeded by 182,001–183,000
