= List of minor planets: 181001–182000 =

The following is a partial list of minor planets, running from minor-planet number 181001 through 182000, inclusive. The primary data for this and other partial lists is based on JPL's "Small-Body Orbital Elements" and data available from the Minor Planet Center. Critical list information is also provided by the MPC, unless otherwise specified from Lowell Observatory. A detailed description of the table's columns and additional sources are given on the main page including a complete list of every page in this series, and a statistical break-up on the dynamical classification of minor planets.

Also see the summary list of all named bodies in numerical and alphabetical order, and the corresponding naming citations for the number range of this particular list. New namings may only be added to this list after official publication, as the preannouncement of names is condemned by the Working Group for Small Bodies Nomenclature of the International Astronomical Union.

Near-Earth obj.	MBA (inner)	MBA (outer)	Centaur
Mars-crosser	MBA (middle)	Jupiter trojan	Trans-Neptunian obj.
Unclassified

== 181001–181100 ==
Designation			Discovery			Properties		Ref
Permanent	Provisional	Named after	Date	Site	Discoverer(s)	Category	Diam.	Ref
181001	2005 ND_{40}	—	July 3, 2005	Mount Lemmon	Mount Lemmon Survey	HOF	3.7 km	MPC · JPL
181002	2005 NG_{45}	—	July 5, 2005	Mount Lemmon	Mount Lemmon Survey	·	1.2 km	MPC · JPL
181003	2005 NJ_{47}	—	July 7, 2005	Kitt Peak	Spacewatch	·	1.7 km	MPC · JPL
181004	2005 NU_{47}	—	July 7, 2005	Kitt Peak	Spacewatch	NYS	1.7 km	MPC · JPL
181005	2005 NX_{48}	—	July 4, 2005	Palomar	NEAT	·	3.4 km	MPC · JPL
181006	2005 ND_{54}	—	July 10, 2005	Kitt Peak	Spacewatch	·	1.6 km	MPC · JPL
181007	2005 NG_{55}	—	July 10, 2005	Kitt Peak	Spacewatch	EOS	2.9 km	MPC · JPL
181008	2005 NH_{57}	—	July 5, 2005	Palomar	NEAT	·	2.1 km	MPC · JPL
181009	2005 NE_{63}	—	July 13, 2005	RAS	Lowe, A.	PHO	1.3 km	MPC · JPL
181010	2005 NA_{64}	—	July 1, 2005	Kitt Peak	Spacewatch	·	1.9 km	MPC · JPL
181011	2005 NM_{65}	—	July 1, 2005	Kitt Peak	Spacewatch	AGN	1.4 km	MPC · JPL
181012	2005 NE_{67}	—	July 2, 2005	Kitt Peak	Spacewatch	KOR	1.7 km	MPC · JPL
181013	2005 NU_{73}	—	July 9, 2005	Kitt Peak	Spacewatch	KOR	1.7 km	MPC · JPL
181014	2005 ND_{74}	—	July 9, 2005	Kitt Peak	Spacewatch	MIS	3.1 km	MPC · JPL
181015	2005 NU_{77}	—	July 11, 2005	Mount Lemmon	Mount Lemmon Survey	·	2.4 km	MPC · JPL
181016	2005 ND_{78}	—	July 11, 2005	Kitt Peak	Spacewatch	AGN	1.4 km	MPC · JPL
181017	2005 NK_{78}	—	July 11, 2005	Kitt Peak	Spacewatch	·	1.7 km	MPC · JPL
181018	2005 NU_{80}	—	July 12, 2005	Bergisch Gladbach	W. Bickel	·	3.3 km	MPC · JPL
181019	2005 NY_{84}	—	July 2, 2005	Kitt Peak	Spacewatch	HYG	4.4 km	MPC · JPL
181020	2005 NW_{86}	—	July 3, 2005	Mount Lemmon	Mount Lemmon Survey	KOR	1.8 km	MPC · JPL
181021	2005 NQ_{97}	—	July 9, 2005	Kitt Peak	Spacewatch	·	2.5 km	MPC · JPL
181022	2005 ND_{101}	—	July 10, 2005	Kitt Peak	Spacewatch	·	1.9 km	MPC · JPL
181023	2005 NW_{107}	—	July 7, 2005	Mauna Kea	Veillet, C.	·	1.2 km	MPC · JPL
181024	2005 NM_{115}	—	July 7, 2005	Mauna Kea	Veillet, C.	·	2.0 km	MPC · JPL
181025	2005 OU_{3}	—	July 28, 2005	Reedy Creek	J. Broughton	·	1.6 km	MPC · JPL
181026	2005 OX_{3}	—	July 29, 2005	Palomar	NEAT	WIT	1.2 km	MPC · JPL
181027	2005 OR_{6}	—	July 28, 2005	Palomar	NEAT	·	4.4 km	MPC · JPL
181028	2005 OW_{9}	—	July 27, 2005	Palomar	NEAT	·	1.6 km	MPC · JPL
181029	2005 OX_{9}	—	July 27, 2005	Palomar	NEAT	NYS	2.1 km	MPC · JPL
181030	2005 OP_{11}	—	July 28, 2005	Palomar	NEAT	NYS	1.8 km	MPC · JPL
181031	2005 OX_{11}	—	July 29, 2005	Palomar	NEAT	·	4.5 km	MPC · JPL
181032	2005 OO_{12}	—	July 29, 2005	Palomar	NEAT	EOS	3.1 km	MPC · JPL
181033	2005 OX_{12}	—	July 29, 2005	Palomar	NEAT	NYS	2.2 km	MPC · JPL
181034	2005 OM_{19}	—	July 28, 2005	Palomar	NEAT	KOR	1.7 km	MPC · JPL
181035	2005 OO_{20}	—	July 28, 2005	Palomar	NEAT	·	2.2 km	MPC · JPL
181036	2005 OV_{20}	—	July 28, 2005	Palomar	NEAT	·	3.0 km	MPC · JPL
181037	2005 OE_{22}	—	July 29, 2005	Palomar	NEAT	·	4.3 km	MPC · JPL
181038	2005 OZ_{22}	—	July 29, 2005	Palomar	NEAT	·	6.7 km	MPC · JPL
181039	2005 OH_{24}	—	July 30, 2005	Palomar	NEAT	·	3.5 km	MPC · JPL
181040	2005 OM_{25}	—	July 31, 2005	Palomar	NEAT	·	2.6 km	MPC · JPL
181041	2005 OB_{28}	—	July 30, 2005	Palomar	NEAT	·	2.1 km	MPC · JPL
181042	2005 OF_{29}	—	July 16, 2005	Catalina	CSS	·	2.6 km	MPC · JPL
181043 Anan	2005 PV	Anan	August 4, 2005	Nakagawa	Hori, H., Maeno, H.	·	5.1 km	MPC · JPL
181044	2005 PE_{1}	—	August 1, 2005	Siding Spring	SSS	·	3.1 km	MPC · JPL
181045	2005 PU_{1}	—	August 1, 2005	Siding Spring	SSS	EOS	3.1 km	MPC · JPL
181046	2005 PU_{2}	—	August 2, 2005	Socorro	LINEAR	·	2.0 km	MPC · JPL
181047	2005 PJ_{3}	—	August 4, 2005	Palomar	NEAT	·	1.6 km	MPC · JPL
181048	2005 PS_{3}	—	August 6, 2005	Reedy Creek	J. Broughton	·	6.6 km	MPC · JPL
181049	2005 PH_{4}	—	August 4, 2005	Palomar	NEAT	PHO	1.9 km	MPC · JPL
181050	2005 PB_{5}	—	August 2, 2005	Reedy Creek	J. Broughton	·	2.1 km	MPC · JPL
181051	2005 PC_{5}	—	August 6, 2005	Reedy Creek	J. Broughton	·	3.2 km	MPC · JPL
181052	2005 PO_{8}	—	August 4, 2005	Palomar	NEAT	NYS	1.9 km	MPC · JPL
181053	2005 PH_{9}	—	August 4, 2005	Palomar	NEAT	·	1.5 km	MPC · JPL
181054	2005 PZ_{11}	—	August 4, 2005	Palomar	NEAT	·	2.4 km	MPC · JPL
181055	2005 PA_{14}	—	August 4, 2005	Palomar	NEAT	KOR	2.6 km	MPC · JPL
181056	2005 PX_{17}	—	August 11, 2005	Pla D'Arguines	R. Ferrando, Ferrando, M.	HNS	1.7 km	MPC · JPL
181057	2005 PT_{18}	—	August 9, 2005	Socorro	LINEAR	·	2.7 km	MPC · JPL
181058	2005 PQ_{19}	—	August 6, 2005	Palomar	NEAT	·	2.5 km	MPC · JPL
181059	2005 QJ_{1}	—	August 22, 2005	Palomar	NEAT	·	2.5 km	MPC · JPL
181060	2005 QX_{1}	—	August 22, 2005	Palomar	NEAT	·	2.0 km	MPC · JPL
181061	2005 QF_{2}	—	August 24, 2005	Palomar	NEAT	·	3.7 km	MPC · JPL
181062	2005 QG_{2}	—	August 24, 2005	Palomar	NEAT	·	1.8 km	MPC · JPL
181063	2005 QP_{4}	—	August 24, 2005	Palomar	NEAT	URS	4.5 km	MPC · JPL
181064	2005 QT_{4}	—	August 24, 2005	Palomar	NEAT	·	3.8 km	MPC · JPL
181065	2005 QY_{5}	—	August 24, 2005	Palomar	NEAT	HYG	4.2 km	MPC · JPL
181066	2005 QC_{6}	—	August 24, 2005	Palomar	NEAT	·	5.2 km	MPC · JPL
181067	2005 QG_{9}	—	August 25, 2005	Palomar	NEAT	CYB	5.1 km	MPC · JPL
181068	2005 QA_{12}	—	August 24, 2005	Palomar	NEAT	EOS	5.4 km	MPC · JPL
181069	2005 QF_{15}	—	August 25, 2005	Palomar	NEAT	·	5.6 km	MPC · JPL
181070	2005 QG_{15}	—	August 25, 2005	Palomar	NEAT	·	1.6 km	MPC · JPL
181071	2005 QH_{19}	—	August 25, 2005	Campo Imperatore	CINEOS	HYG	3.8 km	MPC · JPL
181072	2005 QJ_{19}	—	August 25, 2005	Campo Imperatore	CINEOS	·	6.3 km	MPC · JPL
181073	2005 QQ_{19}	—	August 25, 2005	Campo Imperatore	CINEOS	·	3.0 km	MPC · JPL
181074	2005 QQ_{20}	—	August 26, 2005	Anderson Mesa	LONEOS	·	3.4 km	MPC · JPL
181075	2005 QT_{20}	—	August 26, 2005	Anderson Mesa	LONEOS	·	2.9 km	MPC · JPL
181076	2005 QG_{23}	—	August 27, 2005	Anderson Mesa	LONEOS	EUN	2.1 km	MPC · JPL
181077	2005 QB_{26}	—	August 27, 2005	Kitt Peak	Spacewatch	·	3.7 km	MPC · JPL
181078	2005 QH_{26}	—	August 27, 2005	Kitt Peak	Spacewatch	KOR	1.8 km	MPC · JPL
181079	2005 QO_{27}	—	August 27, 2005	Kitt Peak	Spacewatch	·	3.2 km	MPC · JPL
181080	2005 QP_{31}	—	August 22, 2005	Siding Spring	SSS	·	3.0 km	MPC · JPL
181081	2005 QM_{36}	—	August 25, 2005	Palomar	NEAT	·	4.2 km	MPC · JPL
181082	2005 QC_{37}	—	August 25, 2005	Palomar	NEAT	·	3.4 km	MPC · JPL
181083	2005 QY_{37}	—	August 25, 2005	Palomar	NEAT	·	4.3 km	MPC · JPL
181084	2005 QN_{38}	—	August 25, 2005	Campo Imperatore	CINEOS	GEF	2.0 km	MPC · JPL
181085	2005 QF_{42}	—	August 26, 2005	Anderson Mesa	LONEOS	·	4.4 km	MPC · JPL
181086	2005 QL_{46}	—	August 26, 2005	Palomar	NEAT	·	6.3 km	MPC · JPL
181087	2005 QW_{47}	—	August 26, 2005	Palomar	NEAT	·	4.6 km	MPC · JPL
181088	2005 QB_{50}	—	August 26, 2005	Palomar	NEAT	·	4.9 km	MPC · JPL
181089	2005 QV_{51}	—	August 27, 2005	Anderson Mesa	LONEOS	EOS	3.5 km	MPC · JPL
181090	2005 QB_{52}	—	August 27, 2005	Anderson Mesa	LONEOS	·	2.1 km	MPC · JPL
181091	2005 QW_{53}	—	August 28, 2005	Kitt Peak	Spacewatch	MAS	1.1 km	MPC · JPL
181092	2005 QN_{55}	—	August 28, 2005	Anderson Mesa	LONEOS	·	2.6 km	MPC · JPL
181093	2005 QB_{56}	—	August 28, 2005	Kitt Peak	Spacewatch	KOR	2.5 km	MPC · JPL
181094	2005 QF_{56}	—	August 28, 2005	Haleakala	NEAT	TEL	2.2 km	MPC · JPL
181095	2005 QE_{59}	—	August 25, 2005	Palomar	NEAT	·	3.4 km	MPC · JPL
181096	2005 QC_{61}	—	August 26, 2005	Palomar	NEAT	·	4.7 km	MPC · JPL
181097	2005 QG_{64}	—	August 26, 2005	Palomar	NEAT	KOR	1.9 km	MPC · JPL
181098	2005 QW_{64}	—	August 26, 2005	Anderson Mesa	LONEOS	·	5.7 km	MPC · JPL
181099	2005 QC_{66}	—	August 27, 2005	Anderson Mesa	LONEOS	·	4.6 km	MPC · JPL
181100	2005 QV_{69}	—	August 29, 2005	Socorro	LINEAR	MAS	1.5 km	MPC · JPL

== 181101–181200 ==
back to top

Designation			Discovery			Properties		Ref
Permanent	Provisional	Named after	Date	Site	Discoverer(s)	Category	Diam.	Ref
181101	2005 QA_{70}	—	August 29, 2005	Socorro	LINEAR	NYS	1.3 km	MPC · JPL
181102	2005 QB_{71}	—	August 29, 2005	Socorro	LINEAR	EOS	3.7 km	MPC · JPL
181103	2005 QQ_{71}	—	August 29, 2005	Anderson Mesa	LONEOS	·	3.3 km	MPC · JPL
181104	2005 QD_{72}	—	August 29, 2005	Anderson Mesa	LONEOS	NYS	1.8 km	MPC · JPL
181105	2005 QO_{72}	—	August 29, 2005	Kitt Peak	Spacewatch	(16286)	3.2 km	MPC · JPL
181106	2005 QW_{73}	—	August 29, 2005	Anderson Mesa	LONEOS	·	2.9 km	MPC · JPL
181107	2005 QN_{76}	—	August 24, 2005	Palomar	NEAT	EOS	2.3 km	MPC · JPL
181108	2005 QS_{76}	—	August 28, 2005	Saint-Véran	St. Veran	EOS	2.9 km	MPC · JPL
181109	2005 QZ_{80}	—	August 28, 2005	Siding Spring	SSS	·	3.4 km	MPC · JPL
181110	2005 QO_{85}	—	August 30, 2005	Kitt Peak	Spacewatch	·	2.3 km	MPC · JPL
181111	2005 QJ_{88}	—	August 24, 2005	Reedy Creek	J. Broughton	·	3.3 km	MPC · JPL
181112	2005 QL_{91}	—	August 25, 2005	Campo Imperatore	CINEOS	·	5.6 km	MPC · JPL
181113	2005 QS_{92}	—	August 26, 2005	Palomar	NEAT	PAD	2.4 km	MPC · JPL
181114	2005 QK_{93}	—	August 26, 2005	Palomar	NEAT	·	2.6 km	MPC · JPL
181115	2005 QF_{94}	—	August 27, 2005	Palomar	NEAT	·	2.7 km	MPC · JPL
181116	2005 QN_{95}	—	August 27, 2005	Palomar	NEAT	PAD	2.2 km	MPC · JPL
181117	2005 QH_{98}	—	August 27, 2005	Palomar	NEAT	·	7.3 km	MPC · JPL
181118	2005 QM_{98}	—	August 27, 2005	Palomar	NEAT	EOS	2.2 km	MPC · JPL
181119	2005 QO_{106}	—	August 27, 2005	Palomar	NEAT	·	5.5 km	MPC · JPL
181120	2005 QM_{109}	—	August 27, 2005	Palomar	NEAT	·	4.5 km	MPC · JPL
181121	2005 QD_{110}	—	August 27, 2005	Palomar	NEAT	·	2.8 km	MPC · JPL
181122	2005 QV_{111}	—	August 27, 2005	Palomar	NEAT	·	3.1 km	MPC · JPL
181123	2005 QX_{111}	—	August 27, 2005	Palomar	NEAT	AGN	1.6 km	MPC · JPL
181124	2005 QN_{112}	—	August 27, 2005	Palomar	NEAT	·	3.7 km	MPC · JPL
181125	2005 QY_{114}	—	August 27, 2005	Palomar	NEAT	·	4.6 km	MPC · JPL
181126	2005 QN_{115}	—	August 27, 2005	Palomar	NEAT	·	3.1 km	MPC · JPL
181127	2005 QZ_{124}	—	August 28, 2005	Kitt Peak	Spacewatch	·	3.7 km	MPC · JPL
181128	2005 QA_{127}	—	August 28, 2005	Kitt Peak	Spacewatch	THM	2.9 km	MPC · JPL
181129	2005 QN_{135}	—	August 28, 2005	Kitt Peak	Spacewatch	MRX	1.6 km	MPC · JPL
181130	2005 QM_{137}	—	August 28, 2005	Kitt Peak	Spacewatch	·	2.8 km	MPC · JPL
181131	2005 QC_{139}	—	August 28, 2005	Kitt Peak	Spacewatch	·	2.4 km	MPC · JPL
181132	2005 QW_{140}	—	August 29, 2005	Anderson Mesa	LONEOS	·	3.0 km	MPC · JPL
181133	2005 QH_{142}	—	August 30, 2005	Socorro	LINEAR	·	5.9 km	MPC · JPL
181134	2005 QO_{149}	—	August 28, 2005	Siding Spring	SSS	GEF	2.1 km	MPC · JPL
181135	2005 QW_{150}	—	August 30, 2005	Kitt Peak	Spacewatch	·	2.0 km	MPC · JPL
181136 Losonczrita	2005 QA_{152}	Losonczrita	August 25, 2005	Piszkéstető	K. Sárneczky, D. Szám	·	3.2 km	MPC · JPL
181137	2005 QX_{155}	—	August 30, 2005	Palomar	NEAT	·	3.2 km	MPC · JPL
181138	2005 QZ_{156}	—	August 30, 2005	Palomar	NEAT	·	4.6 km	MPC · JPL
181139	2005 QZ_{157}	—	August 26, 2005	Palomar	NEAT	·	2.9 km	MPC · JPL
181140	2005 QW_{165}	—	August 31, 2005	Palomar	NEAT	·	6.1 km	MPC · JPL
181141	2005 QN_{171}	—	August 29, 2005	Palomar	NEAT	·	3.4 km	MPC · JPL
181142	2005 QF_{174}	—	August 31, 2005	Kitt Peak	Spacewatch	·	3.1 km	MPC · JPL
181143	2005 QM_{174}	—	August 31, 2005	Kitt Peak	Spacewatch	SYL · CYB	6.7 km	MPC · JPL
181144	2005 QJ_{177}	—	August 27, 2005	Kitt Peak	Spacewatch	KOR	2.1 km	MPC · JPL
181145	2005 QC_{178}	—	August 24, 2005	Palomar	NEAT	EOS	2.4 km	MPC · JPL
181146	2005 QY_{178}	—	August 31, 2005	Kitt Peak	Spacewatch	·	2.4 km	MPC · JPL
181147	2005 RF_{3}	—	September 4, 2005	Marly	Observatoire Naef	EOS	3.1 km	MPC · JPL
181148	2005 RL_{3}	—	September 3, 2005	Palomar	NEAT	·	2.9 km	MPC · JPL
181149	2005 RV_{6}	—	September 5, 2005	Haleakala	NEAT	·	3.2 km	MPC · JPL
181150	2005 RD_{7}	—	September 6, 2005	Anderson Mesa	LONEOS	·	6.7 km	MPC · JPL
181151	2005 RG_{8}	—	September 8, 2005	Socorro	LINEAR	THM	3.8 km	MPC · JPL
181152	2005 RE_{15}	—	September 1, 2005	Kitt Peak	Spacewatch	·	3.1 km	MPC · JPL
181153	2005 RL_{22}	—	September 10, 2005	Anderson Mesa	LONEOS	slow	4.0 km	MPC · JPL
181154	2005 RX_{22}	—	September 6, 2005	Anderson Mesa	LONEOS	KOR	2.7 km	MPC · JPL
181155	2005 RC_{24}	—	September 11, 2005	Kitt Peak	Spacewatch	·	3.5 km	MPC · JPL
181156	2005 RS_{31}	—	September 13, 2005	Anderson Mesa	LONEOS	·	3.9 km	MPC · JPL
181157	2005 RE_{33}	—	September 14, 2005	Catalina	CSS	·	5.7 km	MPC · JPL
181158	2005 RN_{41}	—	September 13, 2005	Kitt Peak	Spacewatch	EOS	2.6 km	MPC · JPL
181159	2005 RK_{47}	—	September 13, 2005	Apache Point	A. C. Becker	·	2.8 km	MPC · JPL
181160	2005 SZ_{2}	—	September 23, 2005	Catalina	CSS	VER	5.0 km	MPC · JPL
181161	2005 SQ_{3}	—	September 23, 2005	Kitt Peak	Spacewatch	·	2.8 km	MPC · JPL
181162	2005 SK_{11}	—	September 23, 2005	Kitt Peak	Spacewatch	THM	4.6 km	MPC · JPL
181163	2005 SP_{13}	—	September 24, 2005	Kitt Peak	Spacewatch	EOS	2.9 km	MPC · JPL
181164	2005 SQ_{16}	—	September 26, 2005	Kitt Peak	Spacewatch	·	4.1 km	MPC · JPL
181165	2005 SD_{22}	—	September 23, 2005	Kitt Peak	Spacewatch	·	4.3 km	MPC · JPL
181166	2005 SZ_{24}	—	September 24, 2005	Anderson Mesa	LONEOS	·	2.5 km	MPC · JPL
181167	2005 SF_{31}	—	September 23, 2005	Anderson Mesa	LONEOS	·	3.5 km	MPC · JPL
181168	2005 SL_{43}	—	September 24, 2005	Kitt Peak	Spacewatch	·	3.0 km	MPC · JPL
181169	2005 SB_{53}	—	September 25, 2005	Kitt Peak	Spacewatch	·	3.3 km	MPC · JPL
181170	2005 SS_{59}	—	September 26, 2005	Kitt Peak	Spacewatch	·	2.7 km	MPC · JPL
181171	2005 SL_{60}	—	September 26, 2005	Palomar	NEAT	KOR	2.2 km	MPC · JPL
181172	2005 SQ_{66}	—	September 27, 2005	Kitt Peak	Spacewatch	·	7.2 km	MPC · JPL
181173	2005 SY_{66}	—	September 27, 2005	Kitt Peak	Spacewatch	·	3.4 km	MPC · JPL
181174	2005 SV_{70}	—	September 27, 2005	Junk Bond	D. Healy	VER	4.9 km	MPC · JPL
181175	2005 SY_{71}	—	September 23, 2005	Catalina	CSS	CYB	5.1 km	MPC · JPL
181176	2005 SN_{73}	—	September 23, 2005	Kitt Peak	Spacewatch	·	5.2 km	MPC · JPL
181177	2005 SV_{73}	—	September 23, 2005	Catalina	CSS	CYB	8.3 km	MPC · JPL
181178	2005 SL_{77}	—	September 24, 2005	Kitt Peak	Spacewatch	·	2.5 km	MPC · JPL
181179	2005 SV_{77}	—	September 24, 2005	Kitt Peak	Spacewatch	·	3.1 km	MPC · JPL
181180	2005 ST_{81}	—	September 24, 2005	Kitt Peak	Spacewatch	·	5.4 km	MPC · JPL
181181	2005 SZ_{85}	—	September 24, 2005	Kitt Peak	Spacewatch	·	5.9 km	MPC · JPL
181182	2005 SF_{87}	—	September 24, 2005	Kitt Peak	Spacewatch	KOR	1.9 km	MPC · JPL
181183	2005 SG_{92}	—	September 24, 2005	Kitt Peak	Spacewatch	·	3.6 km	MPC · JPL
181184	2005 SQ_{95}	—	September 25, 2005	Kitt Peak	Spacewatch	EOS	3.8 km	MPC · JPL
181185	2005 SD_{104}	—	September 25, 2005	Kitt Peak	Spacewatch	TIR	3.6 km	MPC · JPL
181186	2005 SW_{104}	—	September 25, 2005	Kitt Peak	Spacewatch	·	4.2 km	MPC · JPL
181187	2005 SG_{105}	—	September 25, 2005	Kitt Peak	Spacewatch	·	4.0 km	MPC · JPL
181188	2005 SL_{109}	—	September 26, 2005	Kitt Peak	Spacewatch	KOR	1.9 km	MPC · JPL
181189	2005 SP_{114}	—	September 27, 2005	Kitt Peak	Spacewatch	·	3.4 km	MPC · JPL
181190	2005 SU_{114}	—	September 27, 2005	Kitt Peak	Spacewatch	·	4.2 km	MPC · JPL
181191	2005 SR_{120}	—	September 29, 2005	Kitt Peak	Spacewatch	·	5.0 km	MPC · JPL
181192	2005 SM_{123}	—	September 29, 2005	Anderson Mesa	LONEOS	PAD	2.5 km	MPC · JPL
181193	2005 ST_{123}	—	September 29, 2005	Kitt Peak	Spacewatch	·	1.6 km	MPC · JPL
181194	2005 SV_{129}	—	September 29, 2005	Mount Lemmon	Mount Lemmon Survey	·	3.3 km	MPC · JPL
181195	2005 SN_{132}	—	September 29, 2005	Kitt Peak	Spacewatch	·	4.7 km	MPC · JPL
181196	2005 SF_{137}	—	September 24, 2005	Kitt Peak	Spacewatch	·	4.6 km	MPC · JPL
181197	2005 SJ_{140}	—	September 25, 2005	Kitt Peak	Spacewatch	·	2.5 km	MPC · JPL
181198	2005 SW_{141}	—	September 25, 2005	Kitt Peak	Spacewatch	KOR	2.1 km	MPC · JPL
181199	2005 SP_{147}	—	September 25, 2005	Kitt Peak	Spacewatch	·	2.7 km	MPC · JPL
181200	2005 SO_{155}	—	September 26, 2005	Socorro	LINEAR	fast	4.0 km	MPC · JPL

== 181201–181300 ==
back to top

Designation			Discovery			Properties		Ref
Permanent	Provisional	Named after	Date	Site	Discoverer(s)	Category	Diam.	Ref
181201	2005 ST_{160}	—	September 27, 2005	Kitt Peak	Spacewatch	·	2.6 km	MPC · JPL
181202	2005 SQ_{162}	—	September 27, 2005	Kitt Peak	Spacewatch	KOR	1.9 km	MPC · JPL
181203	2005 SW_{166}	—	September 28, 2005	Palomar	NEAT	ADE	3.2 km	MPC · JPL
181204	2005 SU_{169}	—	September 29, 2005	Kitt Peak	Spacewatch	MRX	1.9 km	MPC · JPL
181205	2005 SR_{171}	—	September 29, 2005	Kitt Peak	Spacewatch	·	5.4 km	MPC · JPL
181206	2005 SG_{173}	—	September 29, 2005	Kitt Peak	Spacewatch	·	2.9 km	MPC · JPL
181207	2005 SX_{173}	—	September 29, 2005	Anderson Mesa	LONEOS	KOR	2.4 km	MPC · JPL
181208	2005 SA_{179}	—	September 29, 2005	Anderson Mesa	LONEOS	·	2.7 km	MPC · JPL
181209	2005 SP_{184}	—	September 29, 2005	Kitt Peak	Spacewatch	·	3.7 km	MPC · JPL
181210	2005 SR_{184}	—	September 29, 2005	Kitt Peak	Spacewatch	·	2.9 km	MPC · JPL
181211	2005 SQ_{190}	—	September 29, 2005	Anderson Mesa	LONEOS	·	3.3 km	MPC · JPL
181212	2005 SW_{190}	—	September 29, 2005	Anderson Mesa	LONEOS	HYG	5.5 km	MPC · JPL
181213	2005 SW_{191}	—	September 29, 2005	Mount Lemmon	Mount Lemmon Survey	·	3.3 km	MPC · JPL
181214	2005 SW_{197}	—	September 30, 2005	Mount Lemmon	Mount Lemmon Survey	·	2.8 km	MPC · JPL
181215	2005 SM_{198}	—	September 30, 2005	Mount Lemmon	Mount Lemmon Survey	·	2.7 km	MPC · JPL
181216	2005 SY_{252}	—	September 24, 2005	Palomar	NEAT	·	4.6 km	MPC · JPL
181217	2005 SA_{255}	—	September 22, 2005	Palomar	NEAT	·	2.3 km	MPC · JPL
181218	2005 SE_{255}	—	September 22, 2005	Palomar	NEAT	·	3.1 km	MPC · JPL
181219	2005 SE_{259}	—	September 24, 2005	Anderson Mesa	LONEOS	TIR	4.1 km	MPC · JPL
181220	2005 SB_{263}	—	September 23, 2005	Kitt Peak	Spacewatch	KOR	2.3 km	MPC · JPL
181221	2005 SR_{270}	—	September 30, 2005	Anderson Mesa	LONEOS	·	5.5 km	MPC · JPL
181222	2005 TN_{1}	—	October 1, 2005	Socorro	LINEAR	·	5.9 km	MPC · JPL
181223	2005 TY_{2}	—	October 1, 2005	Catalina	CSS	·	2.8 km	MPC · JPL
181224	2005 TU_{3}	—	October 1, 2005	Anderson Mesa	LONEOS	·	3.3 km	MPC · JPL
181225	2005 TP_{29}	—	October 3, 2005	Kitt Peak	Spacewatch	·	2.3 km	MPC · JPL
181226	2005 TD_{35}	—	October 1, 2005	Kitt Peak	Spacewatch	(260) · CYB	5.4 km	MPC · JPL
181227	2005 TK_{36}	—	October 1, 2005	Mount Lemmon	Mount Lemmon Survey	·	2.2 km	MPC · JPL
181228	2005 TA_{46}	—	October 9, 2005	Ottmarsheim	Ottmarsheim	·	5.0 km	MPC · JPL
181229	2005 TO_{49}	—	October 2, 2005	Mount Lemmon	Mount Lemmon Survey	·	2.9 km	MPC · JPL
181230	2005 TU_{64}	—	October 1, 2005	Kitt Peak	Spacewatch	AGN	1.3 km	MPC · JPL
181231	2005 TA_{83}	—	October 3, 2005	Socorro	LINEAR	SYL · CYB	7.5 km	MPC · JPL
181232	2005 TO_{96}	—	October 6, 2005	Mount Lemmon	Mount Lemmon Survey	ANF	2.4 km	MPC · JPL
181233	2005 TB_{101}	—	October 7, 2005	Catalina	CSS	KOR	2.4 km	MPC · JPL
181234	2005 TM_{130}	—	October 7, 2005	Kitt Peak	Spacewatch	VER	5.9 km	MPC · JPL
181235	2005 TQ_{130}	—	October 7, 2005	Kitt Peak	Spacewatch	·	4.3 km	MPC · JPL
181236	2005 TV_{136}	—	October 6, 2005	Kitt Peak	Spacewatch	·	4.3 km	MPC · JPL
181237	2005 TF_{154}	—	October 8, 2005	Socorro	LINEAR	·	4.8 km	MPC · JPL
181238	2005 TP_{176}	—	October 1, 2005	Kitt Peak	Spacewatch	·	2.8 km	MPC · JPL
181239	2005 TC_{190}	—	October 1, 2005	Kitt Peak	Spacewatch	·	4.0 km	MPC · JPL
181240	2005 UQ_{4}	—	October 26, 2005	Socorro	LINEAR	·	3.0 km	MPC · JPL
181241 Dipasquale	2005 UD_{7}	Dipasquale	October 28, 2005	Vallemare di Borbona Obs.	V. S. Casulli	VER	4.4 km	MPC · JPL
181242	2005 UO_{24}	—	October 23, 2005	Kitt Peak	Spacewatch	·	4.8 km	MPC · JPL
181243	2005 UC_{48}	—	October 22, 2005	Palomar	NEAT	MRX	2.1 km	MPC · JPL
181244	2005 UH_{48}	—	October 22, 2005	Palomar	NEAT	·	5.8 km	MPC · JPL
181245	2005 UW_{65}	—	October 22, 2005	Anderson Mesa	LONEOS	·	6.0 km	MPC · JPL
181246	2005 UX_{65}	—	October 22, 2005	Palomar	NEAT	·	3.0 km	MPC · JPL
181247	2005 UP_{66}	—	October 22, 2005	Palomar	NEAT	·	5.7 km	MPC · JPL
181248	2005 UL_{145}	—	October 26, 2005	Kitt Peak	Spacewatch	(260) · CYB	6.7 km	MPC · JPL
181249 Tkachenko	2005 UZ_{158}	Tkachenko	October 30, 2005	Andrushivka	Andrushivka	EOS · fast?	3.5 km	MPC · JPL
181250	2005 UU_{177}	—	October 24, 2005	Kitt Peak	Spacewatch	·	3.1 km	MPC · JPL
181251	2005 UD_{252}	—	October 25, 2005	Anderson Mesa	LONEOS	HYG	4.4 km	MPC · JPL
181252	2005 UD_{255}	—	October 24, 2005	Kitt Peak	Spacewatch	THM	3.2 km	MPC · JPL
181253	2005 UD_{283}	—	October 26, 2005	Kitt Peak	Spacewatch	·	1.9 km	MPC · JPL
181254	2005 UJ_{288}	—	October 26, 2005	Kitt Peak	Spacewatch	3:2	6.6 km	MPC · JPL
181255	2005 UC_{317}	—	October 27, 2005	Palomar	NEAT	·	3.2 km	MPC · JPL
181256	2005 UD_{359}	—	October 25, 2005	Kitt Peak	Spacewatch	3:2 · SHU	12 km	MPC · JPL
181257	2005 UW_{363}	—	October 27, 2005	Kitt Peak	Spacewatch	·	3.1 km	MPC · JPL
181258	2005 VW_{8}	—	November 1, 2005	Kitt Peak	Spacewatch	·	3.6 km	MPC · JPL
181259	2005 VH_{9}	—	November 1, 2005	Kitt Peak	Spacewatch	·	3.5 km	MPC · JPL
181260	2005 VR_{43}	—	November 3, 2005	Kitt Peak	Spacewatch	·	3.0 km	MPC · JPL
181261	2005 VY_{76}	—	November 4, 2005	Catalina	CSS	·	3.6 km	MPC · JPL
181262	2005 VV_{79}	—	November 4, 2005	Catalina	CSS	EOS	3.8 km	MPC · JPL
181263	2005 VB_{99}	—	November 10, 2005	Kitt Peak	Spacewatch	·	4.7 km	MPC · JPL
181264	2005 VE_{113}	—	November 10, 2005	Catalina	CSS	HYG	4.8 km	MPC · JPL
181265	2005 VC_{132}	—	November 1, 2005	Apache Point	A. C. Becker	VER	3.3 km	MPC · JPL
181266	2005 WU_{5}	—	November 21, 2005	Anderson Mesa	LONEOS	·	3.9 km	MPC · JPL
181267	2005 WX_{16}	—	November 22, 2005	Kitt Peak	Spacewatch	THM	3.0 km	MPC · JPL
181268	2005 WS_{36}	—	November 22, 2005	Kitt Peak	Spacewatch	·	4.0 km	MPC · JPL
181269	2005 WV_{86}	—	November 28, 2005	Catalina	CSS	·	6.6 km	MPC · JPL
181270	2005 WS_{126}	—	November 25, 2005	Mount Lemmon	Mount Lemmon Survey	·	3.0 km	MPC · JPL
181271	2005 WE_{163}	—	November 29, 2005	Mount Lemmon	Mount Lemmon Survey	EOS	2.6 km	MPC · JPL
181272	2005 WR_{184}	—	November 29, 2005	Palomar	NEAT	·	6.2 km	MPC · JPL
181273	2005 XY_{1}	—	December 1, 2005	Mount Lemmon	Mount Lemmon Survey	KOR	1.9 km	MPC · JPL
181274	2005 XC_{8}	—	December 5, 2005	Pla D'Arguines	D'Arguines, Pla	·	2.4 km	MPC · JPL
181275	2005 XN_{8}	—	December 1, 2005	Kitt Peak	Spacewatch	3:2 · SHU	6.0 km	MPC · JPL
181276	2005 XN_{28}	—	December 1, 2005	Catalina	CSS	·	4.4 km	MPC · JPL
181277	2005 YA_{2}	—	December 21, 2005	Kitt Peak	Spacewatch	·	4.9 km	MPC · JPL
181278	2005 YR_{53}	—	December 22, 2005	Kitt Peak	Spacewatch	L5	10 km	MPC · JPL
181279 Iapyx	2006 BF_{8}	Iapyx	January 22, 2006	Tenagra II	J.-C. Merlin	L5	10 km	MPC · JPL
181280	2006 ES_{71}	—	March 2, 2006	Kitt Peak	Spacewatch	MAR	1.4 km	MPC · JPL
181281	2006 KO_{82}	—	May 25, 2006	Mount Lemmon	Mount Lemmon Survey	·	890 m	MPC · JPL
181282	2006 KK_{97}	—	May 25, 2006	Kitt Peak	Spacewatch	·	2.0 km	MPC · JPL
181283	2006 OQ_{2}	—	July 19, 2006	Palomar	NEAT	·	1.3 km	MPC · JPL
181284	2006 OH_{4}	—	July 21, 2006	Mount Lemmon	Mount Lemmon Survey	·	910 m	MPC · JPL
181285	2006 OO_{4}	—	July 21, 2006	Mount Lemmon	Mount Lemmon Survey	·	3.6 km	MPC · JPL
181286	2006 OS_{4}	—	July 21, 2006	Mount Lemmon	Mount Lemmon Survey	·	2.8 km	MPC · JPL
181287	2006 OF_{7}	—	July 24, 2006	Socorro	LINEAR	·	4.7 km	MPC · JPL
181288	2006 OW_{14}	—	July 20, 2006	Reedy Creek	J. Broughton	·	2.1 km	MPC · JPL
181289	2006 OF_{17}	—	July 21, 2006	Mount Lemmon	Mount Lemmon Survey	·	1.1 km	MPC · JPL
181290	2006 OU_{20}	—	July 21, 2006	Mount Lemmon	Mount Lemmon Survey	·	2.4 km	MPC · JPL
181291	2006 PR_{1}	—	August 11, 2006	Palomar	NEAT	·	8.2 km	MPC · JPL
181292	2006 PR_{10}	—	August 13, 2006	Palomar	NEAT	·	1.7 km	MPC · JPL
181293	2006 PB_{12}	—	August 13, 2006	Palomar	NEAT	NYS	1.1 km	MPC · JPL
181294	2006 PP_{12}	—	August 13, 2006	Palomar	NEAT	·	1.6 km	MPC · JPL
181295	2006 PH_{21}	—	August 15, 2006	Palomar	NEAT	·	1.2 km	MPC · JPL
181296	2006 PV_{24}	—	August 12, 2006	Palomar	NEAT	·	2.7 km	MPC · JPL
181297	2006 PY_{26}	—	August 15, 2006	Palomar	NEAT	·	800 m	MPC · JPL
181298 Ladányi	2006 QY	Ladányi	August 17, 2006	Piszkéstető	K. Sárneczky	·	4.8 km	MPC · JPL
181299	2006 QZ_{2}	—	August 17, 2006	Palomar	NEAT	·	1.1 km	MPC · JPL
181300	2006 QR_{8}	—	August 19, 2006	Kitt Peak	Spacewatch	·	2.2 km	MPC · JPL

== 181301–181400 ==
back to top

Designation			Discovery			Properties		Ref
Permanent	Provisional	Named after	Date	Site	Discoverer(s)	Category	Diam.	Ref
181301	2006 QD_{9}	—	August 19, 2006	Kitt Peak	Spacewatch	·	2.2 km	MPC · JPL
181302	2006 QS_{19}	—	August 17, 2006	Socorro	LINEAR	JUN	2.1 km	MPC · JPL
181303	2006 QY_{20}	—	August 18, 2006	Anderson Mesa	LONEOS	·	1.5 km	MPC · JPL
181304	2006 QO_{24}	—	August 17, 2006	Palomar	NEAT	·	2.9 km	MPC · JPL
181305	2006 QR_{24}	—	August 17, 2006	Palomar	NEAT	·	1.6 km	MPC · JPL
181306	2006 QK_{25}	—	August 18, 2006	Socorro	LINEAR	·	1.2 km	MPC · JPL
181307	2006 QX_{29}	—	August 19, 2006	Anderson Mesa	LONEOS	NYS	1.7 km	MPC · JPL
181308	2006 QB_{30}	—	August 19, 2006	Anderson Mesa	LONEOS	·	3.7 km	MPC · JPL
181309	2006 QV_{30}	—	August 22, 2006	Palomar	NEAT	JUN	1.6 km	MPC · JPL
181310	2006 QE_{35}	—	August 17, 2006	Palomar	NEAT	·	1.3 km	MPC · JPL
181311	2006 QW_{35}	—	August 17, 2006	Palomar	NEAT	·	4.6 km	MPC · JPL
181312	2006 QV_{39}	—	August 24, 2006	San Marcello	A. Boattini, L. Tesi	·	960 m	MPC · JPL
181313	2006 QX_{45}	—	August 19, 2006	Kitt Peak	Spacewatch	·	1.7 km	MPC · JPL
181314	2006 QY_{46}	—	August 20, 2006	Kitt Peak	Spacewatch	·	1.9 km	MPC · JPL
181315	2006 QW_{47}	—	August 21, 2006	Socorro	LINEAR	·	1.4 km	MPC · JPL
181316	2006 QX_{48}	—	August 21, 2006	Kitt Peak	Spacewatch	·	1.1 km	MPC · JPL
181317	2006 QX_{50}	—	August 22, 2006	Palomar	NEAT	·	1.0 km	MPC · JPL
181318	2006 QT_{55}	—	August 24, 2006	Socorro	LINEAR	·	1.5 km	MPC · JPL
181319	2006 QU_{56}	—	August 24, 2006	Socorro	LINEAR	EUN	2.2 km	MPC · JPL
181320	2006 QX_{56}	—	August 27, 2006	Anderson Mesa	LONEOS	H	720 m	MPC · JPL
181321	2006 QR_{62}	—	August 23, 2006	Socorro	LINEAR	·	1.3 km	MPC · JPL
181322	2006 QZ_{67}	—	August 21, 2006	Kitt Peak	Spacewatch	·	1.5 km	MPC · JPL
181323	2006 QJ_{79}	—	August 24, 2006	Palomar	NEAT	·	1.1 km	MPC · JPL
181324	2006 QX_{80}	—	August 24, 2006	Palomar	NEAT	NYS	1.4 km	MPC · JPL
181325	2006 QW_{88}	—	August 27, 2006	Kitt Peak	Spacewatch	MAR	1.3 km	MPC · JPL
181326	2006 QS_{90}	—	August 22, 2006	Palomar	NEAT	H	960 m	MPC · JPL
181327	2006 QZ_{94}	—	August 16, 2006	Palomar	NEAT	·	1.4 km	MPC · JPL
181328	2006 QD_{95}	—	August 16, 2006	Palomar	NEAT	·	1.2 km	MPC · JPL
181329	2006 QZ_{97}	—	August 22, 2006	Palomar	NEAT	·	3.8 km	MPC · JPL
181330	2006 QX_{109}	—	August 28, 2006	Kitt Peak	Spacewatch	·	2.8 km	MPC · JPL
181331	2006 QH_{112}	—	August 23, 2006	Palomar	NEAT	H	750 m	MPC · JPL
181332	2006 QS_{112}	—	August 23, 2006	Palomar	NEAT	·	1.3 km	MPC · JPL
181333	2006 QX_{113}	—	August 25, 2006	Socorro	LINEAR	·	1.1 km	MPC · JPL
181334	2006 QY_{119}	—	August 28, 2006	Catalina	CSS	AEO	3.1 km	MPC · JPL
181335	2006 QQ_{122}	—	August 29, 2006	Catalina	CSS	ADE	3.5 km	MPC · JPL
181336	2006 QD_{125}	—	August 16, 2006	Palomar	NEAT	·	1.9 km	MPC · JPL
181337	2006 QW_{126}	—	August 16, 2006	Palomar	NEAT	·	1.6 km	MPC · JPL
181338	2006 QK_{147}	—	August 18, 2006	Kitt Peak	Spacewatch	NYS ·	1.3 km	MPC · JPL
181339	2006 QK_{159}	—	August 19, 2006	Kitt Peak	Spacewatch	·	1.1 km	MPC · JPL
181340	2006 QX_{182}	—	August 19, 2006	Kitt Peak	Spacewatch	NYS	1.3 km	MPC · JPL
181341	2006 RJ_{4}	—	September 12, 2006	Catalina	CSS	NYS	1.5 km	MPC · JPL
181342	2006 RE_{5}	—	September 14, 2006	Catalina	CSS	·	2.1 km	MPC · JPL
181343	2006 RS_{6}	—	September 14, 2006	Catalina	CSS	·	3.1 km	MPC · JPL
181344	2006 RB_{7}	—	September 14, 2006	Kitt Peak	Spacewatch	·	850 m	MPC · JPL
181345	2006 RC_{7}	—	September 14, 2006	Kitt Peak	Spacewatch	·	1.5 km	MPC · JPL
181346	2006 RV_{18}	—	September 14, 2006	Palomar	NEAT	·	3.1 km	MPC · JPL
181347	2006 RU_{22}	—	September 15, 2006	Goodricke-Pigott	R. A. Tucker	·	4.1 km	MPC · JPL
181348	2006 RM_{30}	—	September 15, 2006	Kitt Peak	Spacewatch	·	1.4 km	MPC · JPL
181349	2006 RO_{31}	—	September 15, 2006	Kitt Peak	Spacewatch	·	2.5 km	MPC · JPL
181350	2006 RZ_{32}	—	September 15, 2006	Kitt Peak	Spacewatch	·	2.6 km	MPC · JPL
181351	2006 RF_{35}	—	September 14, 2006	Palomar	NEAT	·	4.0 km	MPC · JPL
181352	2006 RY_{37}	—	September 12, 2006	Catalina	CSS	·	1.0 km	MPC · JPL
181353	2006 RJ_{38}	—	September 13, 2006	Palomar	NEAT	·	1.2 km	MPC · JPL
181354	2006 RP_{39}	—	September 12, 2006	Catalina	CSS	·	1.5 km	MPC · JPL
181355	2006 RY_{42}	—	September 14, 2006	Kitt Peak	Spacewatch	·	1.4 km	MPC · JPL
181356	2006 RP_{46}	—	September 14, 2006	Kitt Peak	Spacewatch	HNS	1.9 km	MPC · JPL
181357	2006 RB_{50}	—	September 14, 2006	Kitt Peak	Spacewatch	·	1.3 km	MPC · JPL
181358	2006 RK_{52}	—	September 14, 2006	Kitt Peak	Spacewatch	·	2.5 km	MPC · JPL
181359	2006 RH_{55}	—	September 14, 2006	Kitt Peak	Spacewatch	·	4.3 km	MPC · JPL
181360	2006 RF_{76}	—	September 15, 2006	Kitt Peak	Spacewatch	·	2.8 km	MPC · JPL
181361	2006 RE_{87}	—	September 15, 2006	Kitt Peak	Spacewatch	·	1.2 km	MPC · JPL
181362	2006 RA_{89}	—	September 15, 2006	Kitt Peak	Spacewatch	·	930 m	MPC · JPL
181363	2006 RS_{93}	—	September 15, 2006	Kitt Peak	Spacewatch	·	2.8 km	MPC · JPL
181364	2006 RJ_{95}	—	September 15, 2006	Kitt Peak	Spacewatch	·	2.4 km	MPC · JPL
181365	2006 RF_{99}	—	September 15, 2006	Kitt Peak	Spacewatch	·	1.1 km	MPC · JPL
181366	2006 RW_{99}	—	September 14, 2006	Catalina	CSS	·	1.2 km	MPC · JPL
181367	2006 RF_{101}	—	September 14, 2006	Palomar	NEAT	·	4.6 km	MPC · JPL
181368	2006 SS_{3}	—	September 16, 2006	Socorro	LINEAR	·	2.9 km	MPC · JPL
181369	2006 SX_{3}	—	September 16, 2006	Catalina	CSS	·	1.6 km	MPC · JPL
181370	2006 SZ_{3}	—	September 16, 2006	Catalina	CSS	·	1.1 km	MPC · JPL
181371	2006 SD_{4}	—	September 16, 2006	Catalina	CSS	·	1.5 km	MPC · JPL
181372	2006 SQ_{4}	—	September 16, 2006	Catalina	CSS	(5)	2.5 km	MPC · JPL
181373	2006 SO_{5}	—	September 16, 2006	Palomar	NEAT	BAR	1.8 km	MPC · JPL
181374	2006 SL_{8}	—	September 16, 2006	Anderson Mesa	LONEOS	·	1.3 km	MPC · JPL
181375	2006 SM_{8}	—	September 16, 2006	Anderson Mesa	LONEOS	·	1.4 km	MPC · JPL
181376	2006 SJ_{12}	—	September 16, 2006	Anderson Mesa	LONEOS	·	3.6 km	MPC · JPL
181377	2006 SU_{13}	—	September 17, 2006	Socorro	LINEAR	·	1.0 km	MPC · JPL
181378	2006 SA_{15}	—	September 17, 2006	Catalina	CSS	·	970 m	MPC · JPL
181379	2006 SV_{18}	—	September 17, 2006	Kitt Peak	Spacewatch	MIS	3.3 km	MPC · JPL
181380	2006 SF_{36}	—	September 17, 2006	Anderson Mesa	LONEOS	·	2.4 km	MPC · JPL
181381	2006 SD_{37}	—	September 17, 2006	Kitt Peak	Spacewatch	·	850 m	MPC · JPL
181382	2006 SF_{37}	—	September 17, 2006	Kitt Peak	Spacewatch	·	1.6 km	MPC · JPL
181383	2006 SN_{43}	—	September 16, 2006	Anderson Mesa	LONEOS	·	2.3 km	MPC · JPL
181384	2006 SZ_{46}	—	September 19, 2006	Catalina	CSS	·	1.7 km	MPC · JPL
181385	2006 SU_{47}	—	September 19, 2006	Catalina	CSS	·	1.1 km	MPC · JPL
181386	2006 SD_{49}	—	September 18, 2006	Kitt Peak	Spacewatch	NYS	1.7 km	MPC · JPL
181387	2006 SS_{51}	—	September 17, 2006	Anderson Mesa	LONEOS	·	2.3 km	MPC · JPL
181388	2006 ST_{60}	—	September 18, 2006	Catalina	CSS	GEF	1.7 km	MPC · JPL
181389	2006 SW_{60}	—	September 18, 2006	Catalina	CSS	·	4.4 km	MPC · JPL
181390	2006 SX_{71}	—	September 19, 2006	Kitt Peak	Spacewatch	·	1.8 km	MPC · JPL
181391	2006 SM_{75}	—	September 19, 2006	Kitt Peak	Spacewatch	·	3.1 km	MPC · JPL
181392 Katonajózsef	2006 SY_{77}	Katonajózsef	September 23, 2006	Piszkéstető	K. Sárneczky, Kuli, Z.	·	3.2 km	MPC · JPL
181393	2006 SK_{90}	—	September 18, 2006	Kitt Peak	Spacewatch	MAS	890 m	MPC · JPL
181394	2006 SX_{90}	—	September 18, 2006	Kitt Peak	Spacewatch	(12739)	1.8 km	MPC · JPL
181395	2006 SY_{92}	—	September 18, 2006	Kitt Peak	Spacewatch	·	1.5 km	MPC · JPL
181396	2006 SW_{95}	—	September 18, 2006	Kitt Peak	Spacewatch	·	3.2 km	MPC · JPL
181397	2006 SF_{99}	—	September 18, 2006	Kitt Peak	Spacewatch	·	2.7 km	MPC · JPL
181398	2006 SC_{108}	—	September 19, 2006	Anderson Mesa	LONEOS	·	1.7 km	MPC · JPL
181399	2006 SD_{111}	—	September 21, 2006	Anderson Mesa	LONEOS	·	2.2 km	MPC · JPL
181400	2006 SV_{115}	—	September 24, 2006	Anderson Mesa	LONEOS	·	5.3 km	MPC · JPL

== 181401–181500 ==
back to top

Designation			Discovery			Properties		Ref
Permanent	Provisional	Named after	Date	Site	Discoverer(s)	Category	Diam.	Ref
181401	2006 SF_{117}	—	September 24, 2006	Kitt Peak	Spacewatch	·	1.0 km	MPC · JPL
181402	2006 SR_{118}	—	September 24, 2006	Junk Bond	D. Healy	·	3.8 km	MPC · JPL
181403	2006 SW_{121}	—	September 19, 2006	Catalina	CSS	·	1.5 km	MPC · JPL
181404	2006 SD_{124}	—	September 19, 2006	Catalina	CSS	·	1.1 km	MPC · JPL
181405	2006 SK_{126}	—	September 21, 2006	Anderson Mesa	LONEOS	·	2.8 km	MPC · JPL
181406	2006 SO_{132}	—	September 16, 2006	Catalina	CSS	·	1.8 km	MPC · JPL
181407	2006 SQ_{133}	—	September 17, 2006	Catalina	CSS	·	2.6 km	MPC · JPL
181408	2006 SK_{138}	—	September 20, 2006	Anderson Mesa	LONEOS	·	1.7 km	MPC · JPL
181409	2006 SD_{141}	—	September 25, 2006	Anderson Mesa	LONEOS	·	1.5 km	MPC · JPL
181410	2006 SE_{162}	—	September 24, 2006	Anderson Mesa	LONEOS	·	2.9 km	MPC · JPL
181411	2006 SY_{170}	—	September 25, 2006	Kitt Peak	Spacewatch	·	1.2 km	MPC · JPL
181412	2006 SO_{173}	—	September 25, 2006	Socorro	LINEAR	·	1.9 km	MPC · JPL
181413	2006 SY_{179}	—	September 25, 2006	Kitt Peak	Spacewatch	·	1.2 km	MPC · JPL
181414	2006 SX_{186}	—	September 25, 2006	Mount Lemmon	Mount Lemmon Survey	·	4.5 km	MPC · JPL
181415	2006 SA_{193}	—	September 26, 2006	Mount Lemmon	Mount Lemmon Survey	·	2.2 km	MPC · JPL
181416	2006 SL_{210}	—	September 26, 2006	Mount Lemmon	Mount Lemmon Survey	·	1.3 km	MPC · JPL
181417	2006 SO_{214}	—	September 27, 2006	Mount Lemmon	Mount Lemmon Survey	·	1.3 km	MPC · JPL
181418	2006 SJ_{216}	—	September 27, 2006	Kitt Peak	Spacewatch	·	1.5 km	MPC · JPL
181419 Dragonera	2006 SN_{218}	Dragonera	September 28, 2006	OAM	OAM	·	4.0 km	MPC · JPL
181420	2006 SK_{258}	—	September 26, 2006	Kitt Peak	Spacewatch	·	2.9 km	MPC · JPL
181421	2006 SM_{262}	—	September 26, 2006	Mount Lemmon	Mount Lemmon Survey	·	1.6 km	MPC · JPL
181422	2006 SQ_{272}	—	September 27, 2006	Kitt Peak	Spacewatch	·	2.1 km	MPC · JPL
181423	2006 SF_{274}	—	September 27, 2006	Kitt Peak	Spacewatch	·	1.4 km	MPC · JPL
181424	2006 SM_{276}	—	September 28, 2006	Socorro	LINEAR	·	1.8 km	MPC · JPL
181425	2006 SF_{279}	—	September 28, 2006	Goodricke-Pigott	R. A. Tucker	·	2.1 km	MPC · JPL
181426	2006 SP_{281}	—	September 17, 2006	Catalina	CSS	·	1.8 km	MPC · JPL
181427	2006 SW_{281}	—	September 19, 2006	Catalina	CSS	JUN	1.5 km	MPC · JPL
181428	2006 SG_{289}	—	September 26, 2006	Catalina	CSS	·	4.7 km	MPC · JPL
181429	2006 SO_{315}	—	September 27, 2006	Kitt Peak	Spacewatch	·	2.7 km	MPC · JPL
181430	2006 SV_{320}	—	September 27, 2006	Kitt Peak	Spacewatch	·	870 m	MPC · JPL
181431	2006 SA_{321}	—	September 27, 2006	Kitt Peak	Spacewatch	V	1.0 km	MPC · JPL
181432	2006 SX_{327}	—	September 27, 2006	Kitt Peak	Spacewatch	(5)	1.4 km	MPC · JPL
181433	2006 SZ_{335}	—	September 28, 2006	Kitt Peak	Spacewatch	(5)	1.7 km	MPC · JPL
181434	2006 SC_{344}	—	September 28, 2006	Kitt Peak	Spacewatch	AGN ·	3.3 km	MPC · JPL
181435	2006 SD_{347}	—	September 28, 2006	Kitt Peak	Spacewatch	·	2.4 km	MPC · JPL
181436	2006 SM_{348}	—	September 28, 2006	Kitt Peak	Spacewatch	·	3.7 km	MPC · JPL
181437	2006 SB_{349}	—	September 28, 2006	Kitt Peak	Spacewatch	·	1.8 km	MPC · JPL
181438	2006 SY_{350}	—	September 30, 2006	Catalina	CSS	·	1.4 km	MPC · JPL
181439	2006 SW_{359}	—	September 30, 2006	Catalina	CSS	·	2.8 km	MPC · JPL
181440	2006 SN_{380}	—	September 27, 2006	Apache Point	A. C. Becker	TIR	3.8 km	MPC · JPL
181441	2006 SV_{381}	—	September 28, 2006	Apache Point	A. C. Becker	(159)	3.5 km	MPC · JPL
181442	2006 SX_{391}	—	September 19, 2006	Catalina	CSS	·	2.8 km	MPC · JPL
181443	2006 SJ_{393}	—	September 28, 2006	Mount Lemmon	Mount Lemmon Survey	·	1.7 km	MPC · JPL
181444	2006 TB_{14}	—	October 10, 2006	Palomar	NEAT	·	4.0 km	MPC · JPL
181445	2006 TT_{15}	—	October 11, 2006	Kitt Peak	Spacewatch	·	1.5 km	MPC · JPL
181446	2006 TY_{18}	—	October 11, 2006	Kitt Peak	Spacewatch	·	4.4 km	MPC · JPL
181447	2006 TD_{19}	—	October 11, 2006	Kitt Peak	Spacewatch	·	4.3 km	MPC · JPL
181448	2006 TQ_{19}	—	October 11, 2006	Kitt Peak	Spacewatch	·	2.9 km	MPC · JPL
181449	2006 TC_{20}	—	October 11, 2006	Kitt Peak	Spacewatch	MIS	3.6 km	MPC · JPL
181450	2006 TF_{21}	—	October 11, 2006	Kitt Peak	Spacewatch	·	2.3 km	MPC · JPL
181451	2006 TD_{23}	—	October 11, 2006	Kitt Peak	Spacewatch	KOR	1.8 km	MPC · JPL
181452	2006 TJ_{23}	—	October 11, 2006	Kitt Peak	Spacewatch	·	910 m	MPC · JPL
181453	2006 TY_{25}	—	October 12, 2006	Kitt Peak	Spacewatch	·	1.5 km	MPC · JPL
181454	2006 TK_{35}	—	October 12, 2006	Kitt Peak	Spacewatch	·	2.6 km	MPC · JPL
181455	2006 TL_{35}	—	October 12, 2006	Kitt Peak	Spacewatch	·	5.6 km	MPC · JPL
181456	2006 TG_{36}	—	October 12, 2006	Kitt Peak	Spacewatch	V	1.2 km	MPC · JPL
181457	2006 TD_{42}	—	October 12, 2006	Kitt Peak	Spacewatch	·	2.3 km	MPC · JPL
181458	2006 TH_{44}	—	October 12, 2006	Kitt Peak	Spacewatch	·	1.2 km	MPC · JPL
181459	2006 TM_{44}	—	October 12, 2006	Kitt Peak	Spacewatch	·	1.7 km	MPC · JPL
181460	2006 TF_{49}	—	October 12, 2006	Palomar	NEAT	·	1.1 km	MPC · JPL
181461	2006 TZ_{49}	—	October 12, 2006	Palomar	NEAT	·	3.0 km	MPC · JPL
181462	2006 TW_{50}	—	October 12, 2006	Kitt Peak	Spacewatch	·	5.3 km	MPC · JPL
181463	2006 TY_{51}	—	October 12, 2006	Kitt Peak	Spacewatch	(12739)	1.9 km	MPC · JPL
181464	2006 TL_{54}	—	October 12, 2006	Palomar	NEAT	·	1.5 km	MPC · JPL
181465	2006 TX_{54}	—	October 12, 2006	Palomar	NEAT	(5)	1.5 km	MPC · JPL
181466	2006 TU_{55}	—	October 12, 2006	Palomar	NEAT	·	4.0 km	MPC · JPL
181467	2006 TY_{55}	—	October 12, 2006	Palomar	NEAT	·	7.0 km	MPC · JPL
181468	2006 TN_{56}	—	October 13, 2006	Kitt Peak	Spacewatch	V	800 m	MPC · JPL
181469	2006 TK_{63}	—	October 10, 2006	Palomar	NEAT	·	1.2 km	MPC · JPL
181470	2006 TY_{63}	—	October 10, 2006	Palomar	NEAT	·	1.5 km	MPC · JPL
181471	2006 TT_{67}	—	October 11, 2006	Palomar	NEAT	TIR	3.8 km	MPC · JPL
181472	2006 TQ_{71}	—	October 11, 2006	Palomar	NEAT	·	2.7 km	MPC · JPL
181473	2006 TW_{71}	—	October 11, 2006	Palomar	NEAT	·	1.4 km	MPC · JPL
181474	2006 TR_{75}	—	October 11, 2006	Palomar	NEAT	·	3.4 km	MPC · JPL
181475	2006 TL_{80}	—	October 13, 2006	Kitt Peak	Spacewatch	·	3.2 km	MPC · JPL
181476	2006 TK_{84}	—	October 13, 2006	Kitt Peak	Spacewatch	·	2.5 km	MPC · JPL
181477	2006 TN_{87}	—	October 13, 2006	Kitt Peak	Spacewatch	·	2.9 km	MPC · JPL
181478	2006 TR_{88}	—	October 13, 2006	Kitt Peak	Spacewatch	·	1.6 km	MPC · JPL
181479	2006 TL_{90}	—	October 13, 2006	Kitt Peak	Spacewatch	·	3.1 km	MPC · JPL
181480	2006 TF_{92}	—	October 13, 2006	Kitt Peak	Spacewatch	·	2.2 km	MPC · JPL
181481	2006 TR_{92}	—	October 15, 2006	Kitt Peak	Spacewatch	·	2.5 km	MPC · JPL
181482	2006 TO_{93}	—	October 15, 2006	Kitt Peak	Spacewatch	HOF	3.0 km	MPC · JPL
181483 Ampleforth	2006 TA_{95}	Ampleforth	October 15, 2006	Côtes de Meuse	Dawson, M.	·	2.2 km	MPC · JPL
181484	2006 TH_{96}	—	October 12, 2006	Palomar	NEAT	·	6.5 km	MPC · JPL
181485	2006 TT_{99}	—	October 15, 2006	Kitt Peak	Spacewatch	·	1.6 km	MPC · JPL
181486	2006 TT_{101}	—	October 15, 2006	Kitt Peak	Spacewatch	V	820 m	MPC · JPL
181487	2006 TA_{104}	—	October 15, 2006	Kitt Peak	Spacewatch	KOR	1.9 km	MPC · JPL
181488	2006 TM_{104}	—	October 15, 2006	Kitt Peak	Spacewatch	THM	2.5 km	MPC · JPL
181489	2006 TV_{109}	—	October 11, 2006	Palomar	NEAT	EUN	2.0 km	MPC · JPL
181490	2006 TK_{110}	—	October 13, 2006	Kitt Peak	Spacewatch	V	990 m	MPC · JPL
181491	2006 TR_{111}	—	October 1, 2006	Apache Point	A. C. Becker	·	1.9 km	MPC · JPL
181492	2006 UU_{1}	—	October 16, 2006	Wrightwood	J. W. Young	·	3.6 km	MPC · JPL
181493	2006 UJ_{3}	—	October 16, 2006	Kitt Peak	Spacewatch	KOR	1.7 km	MPC · JPL
181494 Forestale	2006 UJ_{4}	Forestale	October 16, 2006	San Marcello	M.T. Mazzucato, L. Tesi	·	1.1 km	MPC · JPL
181495	2006 UZ_{5}	—	October 16, 2006	Kitt Peak	Spacewatch	·	2.2 km	MPC · JPL
181496	2006 UM_{7}	—	October 16, 2006	Catalina	CSS	EMA	3.6 km	MPC · JPL
181497	2006 UX_{8}	—	October 16, 2006	Catalina	CSS	·	3.1 km	MPC · JPL
181498	2006 UK_{11}	—	October 17, 2006	Mount Lemmon	Mount Lemmon Survey	·	3.3 km	MPC · JPL
181499	2006 UY_{11}	—	October 17, 2006	Mount Lemmon	Mount Lemmon Survey	·	1.8 km	MPC · JPL
181500	2006 UJ_{14}	—	October 17, 2006	Mount Lemmon	Mount Lemmon Survey	·	2.4 km	MPC · JPL

== 181501–181600 ==
back to top

Designation			Discovery			Properties		Ref
Permanent	Provisional	Named after	Date	Site	Discoverer(s)	Category	Diam.	Ref
181501	2006 UY_{24}	—	October 16, 2006	Kitt Peak	Spacewatch	·	1.9 km	MPC · JPL
181502	2006 UY_{27}	—	October 16, 2006	Kitt Peak	Spacewatch	·	2.4 km	MPC · JPL
181503	2006 UC_{37}	—	October 16, 2006	Kitt Peak	Spacewatch	KOR	1.8 km	MPC · JPL
181504	2006 UL_{39}	—	October 16, 2006	Kitt Peak	Spacewatch	(29841)	1.7 km	MPC · JPL
181505	2006 UR_{40}	—	October 16, 2006	Kitt Peak	Spacewatch	·	1.8 km	MPC · JPL
181506	2006 UO_{41}	—	October 16, 2006	Kitt Peak	Spacewatch	·	2.3 km	MPC · JPL
181507	2006 UT_{41}	—	October 16, 2006	Kitt Peak	Spacewatch	·	1.9 km	MPC · JPL
181508	2006 UC_{45}	—	October 16, 2006	Kitt Peak	Spacewatch	fast	850 m	MPC · JPL
181509	2006 UJ_{52}	—	October 17, 2006	Mount Lemmon	Mount Lemmon Survey	·	2.1 km	MPC · JPL
181510	2006 UA_{63}	—	October 21, 2006	Mount Lemmon	Mount Lemmon Survey	T_{j} (2.98)	8.9 km	MPC · JPL
181511	2006 UY_{67}	—	October 16, 2006	Catalina	CSS	·	1 km	MPC · JPL
181512	2006 UT_{70}	—	October 16, 2006	Catalina	CSS	·	3.9 km	MPC · JPL
181513	2006 UC_{71}	—	October 16, 2006	Catalina	CSS	·	4.8 km	MPC · JPL
181514	2006 UY_{76}	—	October 17, 2006	Kitt Peak	Spacewatch	·	2.9 km	MPC · JPL
181515	2006 UE_{77}	—	October 17, 2006	Kitt Peak	Spacewatch	·	1.9 km	MPC · JPL
181516	2006 UW_{78}	—	October 17, 2006	Kitt Peak	Spacewatch	AGN	1.4 km	MPC · JPL
181517	2006 UP_{79}	—	October 17, 2006	Kitt Peak	Spacewatch	AGN	1.5 km	MPC · JPL
181518 Ursulakleguin	2006 UL_{86}	Ursulakleguin	October 17, 2006	Mount Lemmon	Mount Lemmon Survey	·	3.6 km	MPC · JPL
181519	2006 UR_{87}	—	October 17, 2006	Mount Lemmon	Mount Lemmon Survey	NYS	1.8 km	MPC · JPL
181520	2006 UY_{99}	—	October 18, 2006	Kitt Peak	Spacewatch	·	1.1 km	MPC · JPL
181521	2006 US_{101}	—	October 18, 2006	Kitt Peak	Spacewatch	·	2.5 km	MPC · JPL
181522	2006 UW_{102}	—	October 18, 2006	Kitt Peak	Spacewatch	·	1.1 km	MPC · JPL
181523	2006 UW_{103}	—	October 18, 2006	Kitt Peak	Spacewatch	·	2.3 km	MPC · JPL
181524	2006 UQ_{106}	—	October 18, 2006	Kitt Peak	Spacewatch	·	2.1 km	MPC · JPL
181525	2006 UP_{117}	—	October 19, 2006	Kitt Peak	Spacewatch	·	2.3 km	MPC · JPL
181526	2006 UQ_{118}	—	October 19, 2006	Kitt Peak	Spacewatch	·	2.9 km	MPC · JPL
181527	2006 UG_{131}	—	October 19, 2006	Kitt Peak	Spacewatch	(7744)	1.7 km	MPC · JPL
181528	2006 UD_{133}	—	October 19, 2006	Kitt Peak	Spacewatch	THM	2.8 km	MPC · JPL
181529	2006 UM_{134}	—	October 19, 2006	Kitt Peak	Spacewatch	·	2.1 km	MPC · JPL
181530	2006 UD_{137}	—	October 19, 2006	Mount Lemmon	Mount Lemmon Survey	·	1.7 km	MPC · JPL
181531	2006 UE_{137}	—	October 19, 2006	Catalina	CSS	·	1.3 km	MPC · JPL
181532	2006 UK_{141}	—	October 19, 2006	Mount Lemmon	Mount Lemmon Survey	·	2.0 km	MPC · JPL
181533	2006 UJ_{144}	—	October 19, 2006	Kitt Peak	Spacewatch	·	2.3 km	MPC · JPL
181534	2006 UC_{152}	—	October 20, 2006	Kitt Peak	Spacewatch	·	2.2 km	MPC · JPL
181535	2006 UA_{170}	—	October 21, 2006	Mount Lemmon	Mount Lemmon Survey	·	3.8 km	MPC · JPL
181536	2006 UE_{174}	—	October 19, 2006	Mount Lemmon	Mount Lemmon Survey	·	4.1 km	MPC · JPL
181537	2006 UE_{175}	—	October 16, 2006	Catalina	CSS	·	2.7 km	MPC · JPL
181538	2006 UL_{176}	—	October 16, 2006	Catalina	CSS	·	2.5 km	MPC · JPL
181539	2006 UX_{177}	—	October 16, 2006	Catalina	CSS	·	2.5 km	MPC · JPL
181540	2006 UA_{181}	—	October 16, 2006	Catalina	CSS	·	2.1 km	MPC · JPL
181541	2006 UK_{188}	—	October 19, 2006	Catalina	CSS	EUN	2.0 km	MPC · JPL
181542	2006 UM_{189}	—	October 19, 2006	Catalina	CSS	·	2.8 km	MPC · JPL
181543	2006 UZ_{189}	—	October 19, 2006	Catalina	CSS	·	2.9 km	MPC · JPL
181544	2006 UH_{191}	—	October 19, 2006	Catalina	CSS	·	3.4 km	MPC · JPL
181545	2006 UX_{198}	—	October 20, 2006	Kitt Peak	Spacewatch	·	2.4 km	MPC · JPL
181546	2006 US_{204}	—	October 22, 2006	Palomar	NEAT	·	2.4 km	MPC · JPL
181547	2006 UT_{217}	—	October 31, 2006	7300 Observatory	W. K. Y. Yeung	·	4.1 km	MPC · JPL
181548	2006 UG_{220}	—	October 16, 2006	Kitt Peak	Spacewatch	·	3.1 km	MPC · JPL
181549	2006 US_{238}	—	October 23, 2006	Kitt Peak	Spacewatch	·	1.4 km	MPC · JPL
181550	2006 UF_{251}	—	October 27, 2006	Mount Lemmon	Mount Lemmon Survey	·	3.0 km	MPC · JPL
181551	2006 UC_{254}	—	October 27, 2006	Mount Lemmon	Mount Lemmon Survey	·	3.2 km	MPC · JPL
181552	2006 UK_{266}	—	October 27, 2006	Kitt Peak	Spacewatch	·	2.6 km	MPC · JPL
181553	2006 UB_{270}	—	October 27, 2006	Mount Lemmon	Mount Lemmon Survey	·	3.4 km	MPC · JPL
181554	2006 UH_{273}	—	October 27, 2006	Kitt Peak	Spacewatch	·	5.8 km	MPC · JPL
181555	2006 US_{273}	—	October 27, 2006	Kitt Peak	Spacewatch	·	2.3 km	MPC · JPL
181556	2006 UR_{275}	—	October 28, 2006	Kitt Peak	Spacewatch	NYS	1.4 km	MPC · JPL
181557	2006 UJ_{282}	—	October 28, 2006	Mount Lemmon	Mount Lemmon Survey	·	2.3 km	MPC · JPL
181558	2006 UT_{282}	—	October 28, 2006	Kitt Peak	Spacewatch	MRX	1.3 km	MPC · JPL
181559	2006 US_{284}	—	October 28, 2006	Kitt Peak	Spacewatch	·	2.5 km	MPC · JPL
181560	2006 UY_{284}	—	October 28, 2006	Mount Lemmon	Mount Lemmon Survey	KOR	1.5 km	MPC · JPL
181561	2006 UX_{286}	—	October 28, 2006	Kitt Peak	Spacewatch	·	1.7 km	MPC · JPL
181562 Paulrosendall	2006 UT_{325}	Paulrosendall	October 20, 2006	Kitt Peak	M. W. Buie	V	1.1 km	MPC · JPL
181563	2006 UQ_{329}	—	October 27, 2006	Catalina	CSS	fast?	2.9 km	MPC · JPL
181564	2006 UJ_{331}	—	October 17, 2006	Catalina	CSS	·	3.9 km	MPC · JPL
181565	2006 VQ_{5}	—	November 10, 2006	Kitt Peak	Spacewatch	·	2.1 km	MPC · JPL
181566	2006 VT_{8}	—	November 11, 2006	Kitt Peak	Spacewatch	·	4.3 km	MPC · JPL
181567	2006 VA_{9}	—	November 11, 2006	Catalina	CSS	·	2.7 km	MPC · JPL
181568	2006 VP_{20}	—	November 9, 2006	Kitt Peak	Spacewatch	·	3.3 km	MPC · JPL
181569 Leetyphoon	2006 VD_{21}	Leetyphoon	November 9, 2006	Lulin Observatory	Lin, H.-C., Q. Ye	·	2.4 km	MPC · JPL
181570	2006 VZ_{21}	—	November 10, 2006	Kitt Peak	Spacewatch	·	970 m	MPC · JPL
181571	2006 VT_{23}	—	November 10, 2006	Kitt Peak	Spacewatch	·	2.4 km	MPC · JPL
181572	2006 VF_{27}	—	November 10, 2006	Kitt Peak	Spacewatch	THM	3.2 km	MPC · JPL
181573	2006 VN_{45}	—	November 11, 2006	Catalina	CSS	·	2.9 km	MPC · JPL
181574	2006 VL_{50}	—	November 10, 2006	Kitt Peak	Spacewatch	HOF	3.8 km	MPC · JPL
181575	2006 VX_{56}	—	November 11, 2006	Kitt Peak	Spacewatch	WIT	1.2 km	MPC · JPL
181576	2006 VC_{57}	—	November 11, 2006	Kitt Peak	Spacewatch	·	2.0 km	MPC · JPL
181577	2006 VV_{64}	—	November 11, 2006	Kitt Peak	Spacewatch	·	2.1 km	MPC · JPL
181578	2006 VS_{72}	—	November 11, 2006	Mount Lemmon	Mount Lemmon Survey	EOS	3.9 km	MPC · JPL
181579	2006 VL_{73}	—	November 11, 2006	Mount Lemmon	Mount Lemmon Survey	V	1.2 km	MPC · JPL
181580	2006 VP_{77}	—	November 12, 2006	Mount Lemmon	Mount Lemmon Survey	HOF	4.3 km	MPC · JPL
181581	2006 VR_{87}	—	November 14, 2006	Catalina	CSS	·	1.2 km	MPC · JPL
181582	2006 VS_{101}	—	November 12, 2006	Catalina	CSS	·	2.4 km	MPC · JPL
181583	2006 VH_{108}	—	November 13, 2006	Palomar	NEAT	·	2.4 km	MPC · JPL
181584	2006 VT_{113}	—	November 13, 2006	Mount Lemmon	Mount Lemmon Survey	·	2.6 km	MPC · JPL
181585	2006 VZ_{124}	—	November 14, 2006	Kitt Peak	Spacewatch	KOR	1.7 km	MPC · JPL
181586	2006 VU_{128}	—	November 15, 2006	Kitt Peak	Spacewatch	·	2.4 km	MPC · JPL
181587	2006 VR_{134}	—	November 15, 2006	Catalina	CSS	·	1.9 km	MPC · JPL
181588	2006 VW_{136}	—	November 15, 2006	Kitt Peak	Spacewatch	·	3.1 km	MPC · JPL
181589	2006 VL_{138}	—	November 15, 2006	Socorro	LINEAR	·	4.1 km	MPC · JPL
181590	2006 VU_{138}	—	November 15, 2006	Kitt Peak	Spacewatch	THM	3.7 km	MPC · JPL
181591	2006 VS_{145}	—	November 15, 2006	Catalina	CSS	·	4.5 km	MPC · JPL
181592	2006 VW_{146}	—	November 15, 2006	Mount Lemmon	Mount Lemmon Survey	·	2.5 km	MPC · JPL
181593	2006 VZ_{149}	—	November 9, 2006	Palomar	NEAT	HOF	5.2 km	MPC · JPL
181594	2006 VE_{154}	—	November 8, 2006	Palomar	NEAT	EOS ·	5.0 km	MPC · JPL
181595	2006 VE_{168}	—	November 15, 2006	Mount Lemmon	Mount Lemmon Survey	·	1.1 km	MPC · JPL
181596	2006 WJ_{2}	—	November 18, 2006	Pla D'Arguines	R. Ferrando	·	3.1 km	MPC · JPL
181597	2006 WU_{5}	—	November 16, 2006	Kitt Peak	Spacewatch	·	2.6 km	MPC · JPL
181598	2006 WQ_{21}	—	November 17, 2006	Mount Lemmon	Mount Lemmon Survey	VER	3.9 km	MPC · JPL
181599	2006 WC_{25}	—	November 17, 2006	Mount Lemmon	Mount Lemmon Survey	NEM	3.4 km	MPC · JPL
181600	2006 WN_{34}	—	November 16, 2006	Kitt Peak	Spacewatch	615	2.1 km	MPC · JPL

== 181601–181700 ==
back to top

Designation			Discovery			Properties		Ref
Permanent	Provisional	Named after	Date	Site	Discoverer(s)	Category	Diam.	Ref
181601	2006 WA_{39}	—	November 16, 2006	Kitt Peak	Spacewatch	·	3.1 km	MPC · JPL
181602	2006 WO_{39}	—	November 16, 2006	Kitt Peak	Spacewatch	·	930 m	MPC · JPL
181603	2006 WL_{42}	—	November 16, 2006	Kitt Peak	Spacewatch	·	2.5 km	MPC · JPL
181604	2006 WE_{44}	—	November 16, 2006	Mount Lemmon	Mount Lemmon Survey	·	930 m	MPC · JPL
181605	2006 WY_{48}	—	November 16, 2006	Mount Lemmon	Mount Lemmon Survey	·	4.0 km	MPC · JPL
181606	2006 WY_{51}	—	November 16, 2006	Kitt Peak	Spacewatch	·	2.1 km	MPC · JPL
181607	2006 WG_{60}	—	November 17, 2006	Socorro	LINEAR	·	4.1 km	MPC · JPL
181608	2006 WT_{93}	—	November 19, 2006	Kitt Peak	Spacewatch	PAD	2.4 km	MPC · JPL
181609	2006 WB_{98}	—	November 19, 2006	Kitt Peak	Spacewatch	·	2.9 km	MPC · JPL
181610	2006 WW_{100}	—	November 19, 2006	Socorro	LINEAR	·	3.3 km	MPC · JPL
181611	2006 WJ_{103}	—	November 19, 2006	Kitt Peak	Spacewatch	·	1.2 km	MPC · JPL
181612	2006 WM_{105}	—	November 19, 2006	Kitt Peak	Spacewatch	AGN	1.8 km	MPC · JPL
181613	2006 WC_{106}	—	November 19, 2006	Kitt Peak	Spacewatch	NYS	1.9 km	MPC · JPL
181614	2006 WL_{109}	—	November 19, 2006	Kitt Peak	Spacewatch	AST	3.2 km	MPC · JPL
181615	2006 WN_{113}	—	November 20, 2006	Kitt Peak	Spacewatch	·	2.2 km	MPC · JPL
181616	2006 WX_{129}	—	November 25, 2006	Goodricke-Pigott	R. A. Tucker	·	1.7 km	MPC · JPL
181617	2006 WL_{141}	—	November 20, 2006	Kitt Peak	Spacewatch	·	3.3 km	MPC · JPL
181618	2006 WX_{149}	—	November 20, 2006	Kitt Peak	Spacewatch	3:2	5.2 km	MPC · JPL
181619	2006 WZ_{160}	—	November 23, 2006	Kitt Peak	Spacewatch	·	1.8 km	MPC · JPL
181620	2006 WA_{167}	—	November 23, 2006	Kitt Peak	Spacewatch	AGN	1.4 km	MPC · JPL
181621	2006 WC_{173}	—	November 23, 2006	Kitt Peak	Spacewatch	·	2.3 km	MPC · JPL
181622	2006 WX_{185}	—	November 17, 2006	Palomar	NEAT	EOS	2.5 km	MPC · JPL
181623	2006 WO_{190}	—	November 25, 2006	Mount Lemmon	Mount Lemmon Survey	·	4.3 km	MPC · JPL
181624	2006 WO_{191}	—	November 27, 2006	Catalina	CSS	·	1.2 km	MPC · JPL
181625	2006 WD_{193}	—	November 27, 2006	Kitt Peak	Spacewatch	·	3.6 km	MPC · JPL
181626	2006 XY_{5}	—	December 8, 2006	Palomar	NEAT	·	3.7 km	MPC · JPL
181627 Philgeluck	2006 XZ_{5}	Philgeluck	December 8, 2006	Tenagra II	J.-C. Merlin	·	1.5 km	MPC · JPL
181628	2006 XJ_{7}	—	December 9, 2006	Kitt Peak	Spacewatch	·	4.1 km	MPC · JPL
181629	2006 XK_{8}	—	December 9, 2006	Kitt Peak	Spacewatch	EOS	3.5 km	MPC · JPL
181630	2006 XA_{10}	—	December 9, 2006	Kitt Peak	Spacewatch	·	2.1 km	MPC · JPL
181631	2006 XJ_{11}	—	December 10, 2006	Kitt Peak	Spacewatch	·	2.6 km	MPC · JPL
181632	2006 XP_{13}	—	December 10, 2006	Kitt Peak	Spacewatch	KOR	1.9 km	MPC · JPL
181633	2006 XZ_{17}	—	December 10, 2006	Kitt Peak	Spacewatch	3:2 · SHU	6.0 km	MPC · JPL
181634	2006 XW_{20}	—	December 11, 2006	Catalina	CSS	·	2.0 km	MPC · JPL
181635	2006 XK_{22}	—	December 12, 2006	Kitt Peak	Spacewatch	·	3.8 km	MPC · JPL
181636	2006 XT_{25}	—	December 12, 2006	Mount Lemmon	Mount Lemmon Survey	·	3.8 km	MPC · JPL
181637	2006 XC_{26}	—	December 12, 2006	Catalina	CSS	·	3.8 km	MPC · JPL
181638	2006 XK_{33}	—	December 11, 2006	Kitt Peak	Spacewatch	WIT	1.1 km	MPC · JPL
181639	2006 XR_{43}	—	December 12, 2006	Kitt Peak	Spacewatch	NEM	2.7 km	MPC · JPL
181640	2006 XJ_{47}	—	December 13, 2006	Socorro	LINEAR	EOS	2.9 km	MPC · JPL
181641	2006 XW_{48}	—	December 13, 2006	Kitt Peak	Spacewatch	·	4.4 km	MPC · JPL
181642	2006 XU_{65}	—	December 12, 2006	Palomar	NEAT	·	3.9 km	MPC · JPL
181643	2006 YB_{5}	—	December 17, 2006	Mount Lemmon	Mount Lemmon Survey	·	3.8 km	MPC · JPL
181644	2006 YV_{7}	—	December 20, 2006	Palomar	NEAT	·	7.3 km	MPC · JPL
181645	2006 YZ_{46}	—	December 22, 2006	Socorro	LINEAR	·	2.8 km	MPC · JPL
181646	2007 AM_{16}	—	January 10, 2007	Kitt Peak	Spacewatch	EOS	3.3 km	MPC · JPL
181647	2007 CT_{25}	—	February 9, 2007	Kitt Peak	Spacewatch	3:2	5.8 km	MPC · JPL
181648	2007 EE_{1}	—	March 6, 2007	Palomar	NEAT	L5	10 km	MPC · JPL
181649	2007 TO_{333}	—	October 11, 2007	Kitt Peak	Spacewatch	MAS	1.0 km	MPC · JPL
181650	2007 UF_{33}	—	October 16, 2007	Catalina	CSS	EUN	3.7 km	MPC · JPL
181651	2007 UT_{59}	—	October 30, 2007	Mount Lemmon	Mount Lemmon Survey	·	3.9 km	MPC · JPL
181652	2007 VO_{11}	—	November 2, 2007	Catalina	CSS	·	4.6 km	MPC · JPL
181653	2007 VM_{99}	—	November 2, 2007	Kitt Peak	Spacewatch	·	3.0 km	MPC · JPL
181654	2007 VD_{166}	—	November 5, 2007	Kitt Peak	Spacewatch	·	1.8 km	MPC · JPL
181655	2007 VZ_{189}	—	November 14, 2007	RAS	Lowe, A.	·	1.5 km	MPC · JPL
181656	2007 VM_{231}	—	November 7, 2007	Kitt Peak	Spacewatch	·	2.7 km	MPC · JPL
181657	2007 VB_{263}	—	November 13, 2007	Kitt Peak	Spacewatch	·	4.0 km	MPC · JPL
181658	2007 VZ_{268}	—	November 12, 2007	Socorro	LINEAR	·	1.8 km	MPC · JPL
181659	2007 XW_{1}	—	December 3, 2007	Catalina	CSS	KOR	2.0 km	MPC · JPL
181660	2007 YK_{45}	—	December 30, 2007	Mount Lemmon	Mount Lemmon Survey	·	720 m	MPC · JPL
181661 Alessandro	2007 YO_{47}	Alessandro	December 29, 2007	Suno	Suno	EOS	2.7 km	MPC · JPL
181662	2007 YW_{55}	—	December 31, 2007	Catalina	CSS	·	3.5 km	MPC · JPL
181663	2008 AW_{2}	—	January 7, 2008	Lulin Observatory	LUSS	V	1.2 km	MPC · JPL
181664	2008 AW_{16}	—	January 10, 2008	Kitt Peak	Spacewatch	·	1.6 km	MPC · JPL
181665	2008 AG_{32}	—	January 12, 2008	Mount Lemmon	Mount Lemmon Survey	L5	15 km	MPC · JPL
181666	2008 AA_{33}	—	January 13, 2008	Socorro	LINEAR	·	2.9 km	MPC · JPL
181667	2008 AU_{38}	—	January 10, 2008	Catalina	CSS	·	1.8 km	MPC · JPL
181668	2008 AX_{44}	—	January 10, 2008	Kitt Peak	Spacewatch	MAS	1.3 km	MPC · JPL
181669	2008 AE_{62}	—	January 11, 2008	Kitt Peak	Spacewatch	·	3.1 km	MPC · JPL
181670 Kengyun	2008 BO_{15}	Kengyun	January 28, 2008	Lulin Observatory	Lin, C.-S., Q. Ye	EOS	5.6 km	MPC · JPL
181671	2008 BO_{22}	—	January 31, 2008	Mount Lemmon	Mount Lemmon Survey	·	2.5 km	MPC · JPL
181672	2008 BV_{23}	—	January 31, 2008	Mount Lemmon	Mount Lemmon Survey	·	980 m	MPC · JPL
181673	2008 BM_{32}	—	January 30, 2008	Catalina	CSS	EOS	3.1 km	MPC · JPL
181674	2008 CF_{52}	—	February 7, 2008	Kitt Peak	Spacewatch	·	1.2 km	MPC · JPL
181675	2008 CC_{70}	—	February 9, 2008	RAS	Lowe, A.	HIL · 3:2 · (6124)	10 km	MPC · JPL
181676	2213 P-L	—	October 22, 1960	Palomar	C. J. van Houten, I. van Houten-Groeneveld, T. Gehrels	·	1.5 km	MPC · JPL
181677	2617 P-L	—	September 24, 1960	Palomar	C. J. van Houten, I. van Houten-Groeneveld, T. Gehrels	·	1.3 km	MPC · JPL
181678	2667 P-L	—	September 24, 1960	Palomar	C. J. van Houten, I. van Houten-Groeneveld, T. Gehrels	NYS	1.3 km	MPC · JPL
181679	2724 P-L	—	September 24, 1960	Palomar	C. J. van Houten, I. van Houten-Groeneveld, T. Gehrels	·	1.4 km	MPC · JPL
181680	4290 P-L	—	September 24, 1960	Palomar	C. J. van Houten, I. van Houten-Groeneveld, T. Gehrels	·	1.1 km	MPC · JPL
181681	4746 P-L	—	September 24, 1960	Palomar	C. J. van Houten, I. van Houten-Groeneveld, T. Gehrels	·	1.8 km	MPC · JPL
181682	4786 P-L	—	September 24, 1960	Palomar	C. J. van Houten, I. van Houten-Groeneveld, T. Gehrels	·	1.9 km	MPC · JPL
181683	4803 P-L	—	September 24, 1960	Palomar	C. J. van Houten, I. van Houten-Groeneveld, T. Gehrels	MAS	960 m	MPC · JPL
181684	6330 P-L	—	September 24, 1960	Palomar	C. J. van Houten, I. van Houten-Groeneveld, T. Gehrels	·	2.0 km	MPC · JPL
181685	6645 P-L	—	September 27, 1960	Palomar	C. J. van Houten, I. van Houten-Groeneveld, T. Gehrels	·	2.4 km	MPC · JPL
181686	6712 P-L	—	September 26, 1960	Palomar	C. J. van Houten, I. van Houten-Groeneveld, T. Gehrels	·	2.7 km	MPC · JPL
181687	9568 P-L	—	October 22, 1960	Palomar	C. J. van Houten, I. van Houten-Groeneveld, T. Gehrels	·	2.8 km	MPC · JPL
181688	2331 T-2	—	September 30, 1973	Palomar	C. J. van Houten, I. van Houten-Groeneveld, T. Gehrels	·	1.3 km	MPC · JPL
181689	3093 T-2	—	September 30, 1973	Palomar	C. J. van Houten, I. van Houten-Groeneveld, T. Gehrels	EOS	3.5 km	MPC · JPL
181690	3174 T-2	—	September 30, 1973	Palomar	C. J. van Houten, I. van Houten-Groeneveld, T. Gehrels	·	1.4 km	MPC · JPL
181691	4089 T-2	—	September 29, 1973	Palomar	C. J. van Houten, I. van Houten-Groeneveld, T. Gehrels	·	1.8 km	MPC · JPL
181692	4621 T-2	—	September 30, 1973	Palomar	C. J. van Houten, I. van Houten-Groeneveld, T. Gehrels	·	1.9 km	MPC · JPL
181693	5096 T-2	—	September 25, 1973	Palomar	C. J. van Houten, I. van Houten-Groeneveld, T. Gehrels	·	2.5 km	MPC · JPL
181694	1049 T-3	—	October 17, 1977	Palomar	C. J. van Houten, I. van Houten-Groeneveld, T. Gehrels	BRA	1.8 km	MPC · JPL
181695	3007 T-3	—	October 16, 1977	Palomar	C. J. van Houten, I. van Houten-Groeneveld, T. Gehrels	·	2.0 km	MPC · JPL
181696	3113 T-3	—	October 16, 1977	Palomar	C. J. van Houten, I. van Houten-Groeneveld, T. Gehrels	·	1.8 km	MPC · JPL
181697	5185 T-3	—	October 16, 1977	Palomar	C. J. van Houten, I. van Houten-Groeneveld, T. Gehrels	·	6.9 km	MPC · JPL
181698	5684 T-3	—	October 16, 1977	Palomar	C. J. van Houten, I. van Houten-Groeneveld, T. Gehrels	·	1.1 km	MPC · JPL
181699	5701 T-3	—	October 16, 1977	Palomar	C. J. van Houten, I. van Houten-Groeneveld, T. Gehrels	·	3.9 km	MPC · JPL
181700	1981 EG_{2}	—	March 2, 1981	Siding Spring	S. J. Bus	·	3.1 km	MPC · JPL

== 181701–181800 ==
back to top

Designation			Discovery			Properties		Ref
Permanent	Provisional	Named after	Date	Site	Discoverer(s)	Category	Diam.	Ref
181701	1981 EP_{34}	—	March 2, 1981	Siding Spring	S. J. Bus	·	2.6 km	MPC · JPL
181702 Forcalquier	1988 RC_{9}	Forcalquier	September 15, 1988	Haute Provence	E. W. Elst	·	1.7 km	MPC · JPL
181703	1988 TS	—	October 13, 1988	Kushiro	S. Ueda, H. Kaneda	·	6.6 km	MPC · JPL
181704	1989 NA	—	July 2, 1989	Palomar	E. F. Helin	·	1.6 km	MPC · JPL
181705	1989 RY	—	September 3, 1989	Haute Provence	E. W. Elst	·	2.5 km	MPC · JPL
181706	1991 UY_{3}	—	October 31, 1991	Kushiro	S. Ueda, H. Kaneda	·	3.1 km	MPC · JPL
181707	1992 EN_{6}	—	March 1, 1992	La Silla	UESAC	·	5.6 km	MPC · JPL
181708	1993 FW	—	March 28, 1993	Mauna Kea	D. C. Jewitt, J. X. Luu	cubewano (hot)	199 km	MPC · JPL
181709	1993 FD_{32}	—	March 19, 1993	La Silla	UESAC	·	3.2 km	MPC · JPL
181710	1993 SO_{8}	—	September 17, 1993	La Silla	E. W. Elst	·	2.0 km	MPC · JPL
181711	1993 SC_{9}	—	September 22, 1993	La Silla	H. Debehogne, E. W. Elst	·	1.8 km	MPC · JPL
181712	1993 TQ_{16}	—	October 9, 1993	La Silla	E. W. Elst	(194)	4.0 km	MPC · JPL
181713	1993 TL_{27}	—	October 9, 1993	La Silla	E. W. Elst	·	2.6 km	MPC · JPL
181714	1993 TM_{27}	—	October 9, 1993	La Silla	E. W. Elst	·	4.6 km	MPC · JPL
181715	1993 TO_{34}	—	October 9, 1993	La Silla	E. W. Elst	·	2.6 km	MPC · JPL
181716	1994 BG_{2}	—	January 18, 1994	Kitt Peak	Spacewatch	·	2.7 km	MPC · JPL
181717	1994 GD_{6}	—	April 6, 1994	Kitt Peak	Spacewatch	·	3.0 km	MPC · JPL
181718	1994 ST_{8}	—	September 28, 1994	Kitt Peak	Spacewatch	·	1.6 km	MPC · JPL
181719	1994 UX_{3}	—	October 26, 1994	Kitt Peak	Spacewatch	·	1.1 km	MPC · JPL
181720	1994 YX_{3}	—	December 31, 1994	Kitt Peak	Spacewatch	·	2.2 km	MPC · JPL
181721	1995 BT_{10}	—	January 29, 1995	Kitt Peak	Spacewatch	·	1.0 km	MPC · JPL
181722	1995 CU	—	February 1, 1995	San Marcello	A. Boattini, L. Tesi	(5)	1.9 km	MPC · JPL
181723	1995 DY_{6}	—	February 24, 1995	Kitt Peak	Spacewatch	·	1.5 km	MPC · JPL
181724	1995 FX_{11}	—	March 27, 1995	Kitt Peak	Spacewatch	·	900 m	MPC · JPL
181725	1995 FO_{20}	—	March 31, 1995	Kitt Peak	Spacewatch	JUN	1.8 km	MPC · JPL
181726	1995 MY_{6}	—	June 29, 1995	Kitt Peak	Spacewatch	·	2.3 km	MPC · JPL
181727	1995 QB_{14}	—	August 25, 1995	Kitt Peak	Spacewatch	AEG	3.9 km	MPC · JPL
181728	1995 ST_{10}	—	September 17, 1995	Kitt Peak	Spacewatch	V	970 m	MPC · JPL
181729	1995 SP_{16}	—	September 18, 1995	Kitt Peak	Spacewatch	·	4.3 km	MPC · JPL
181730	1995 SN_{49}	—	September 22, 1995	Kitt Peak	Spacewatch	·	1.9 km	MPC · JPL
181731	1995 SD_{60}	—	September 24, 1995	Kitt Peak	Spacewatch	·	2.6 km	MPC · JPL
181732	1995 SM_{67}	—	September 18, 1995	Kitt Peak	Spacewatch	·	4.6 km	MPC · JPL
181733	1995 TL_{4}	—	October 15, 1995	Kitt Peak	Spacewatch	·	1.2 km	MPC · JPL
181734	1995 UQ_{6}	—	October 23, 1995	San Marcello	L. Tesi, A. Boattini	·	1.5 km	MPC · JPL
181735	1995 UX_{16}	—	October 17, 1995	Kitt Peak	Spacewatch	NYS ·	1.3 km	MPC · JPL
181736	1995 US_{21}	—	October 19, 1995	Kitt Peak	Spacewatch	·	3.4 km	MPC · JPL
181737	1995 UQ_{43}	—	October 25, 1995	Kitt Peak	Spacewatch	NYS	1.4 km	MPC · JPL
181738	1995 UD_{50}	—	October 17, 1995	Kitt Peak	Spacewatch	KOR	1.5 km	MPC · JPL
181739	1995 UA_{78}	—	October 23, 1995	Kitt Peak	Spacewatch	·	2.7 km	MPC · JPL
181740	1995 VX_{8}	—	November 14, 1995	Kitt Peak	Spacewatch	·	3.1 km	MPC · JPL
181741	1995 VG_{15}	—	November 15, 1995	Kitt Peak	Spacewatch	·	3.1 km	MPC · JPL
181742	1995 WL_{15}	—	November 17, 1995	Kitt Peak	Spacewatch	·	2.8 km	MPC · JPL
181743	1995 XJ_{4}	—	December 14, 1995	Kitt Peak	Spacewatch	·	2.3 km	MPC · JPL
181744	1995 YT_{8}	—	December 18, 1995	Kitt Peak	Spacewatch	·	1.3 km	MPC · JPL
181745	1995 YY_{18}	—	December 22, 1995	Kitt Peak	Spacewatch	·	1.9 km	MPC · JPL
181746	1996 AR_{10}	—	January 13, 1996	Kitt Peak	Spacewatch	·	1.4 km	MPC · JPL
181747	1996 BV_{13}	—	January 16, 1996	Kitt Peak	Spacewatch	·	5.3 km	MPC · JPL
181748	1996 DC_{2}	—	February 26, 1996	Siding Spring	R. H. McNaught	H	880 m	MPC · JPL
181749	1996 EX_{8}	—	March 12, 1996	Kitt Peak	Spacewatch	HYG	3.5 km	MPC · JPL
181750	1996 FL_{14}	—	March 19, 1996	Kitt Peak	Spacewatch	·	1.8 km	MPC · JPL
181751 Phaenops	1996 HS_{12}	Phaenops	April 17, 1996	La Silla	E. W. Elst	L5	15 km	MPC · JPL
181752	1996 JZ_{6}	—	May 11, 1996	Kitt Peak	Spacewatch	·	1.2 km	MPC · JPL
181753	1996 RM_{19}	—	September 7, 1996	Kitt Peak	Spacewatch	·	3.0 km	MPC · JPL
181754	1996 RW_{25}	—	September 13, 1996	Haleakala	NEAT	·	2.4 km	MPC · JPL
181755	1996 TV_{17}	—	October 4, 1996	Kitt Peak	Spacewatch	MRX	1.4 km	MPC · JPL
181756	1996 TO_{27}	—	October 7, 1996	Kitt Peak	Spacewatch	AGN	1.9 km	MPC · JPL
181757	1996 TL_{30}	—	October 7, 1996	Kitt Peak	Spacewatch	·	2.3 km	MPC · JPL
181758	1996 TQ_{32}	—	October 10, 1996	Kitt Peak	Spacewatch	·	2.6 km	MPC · JPL
181759	1996 TX_{50}	—	October 4, 1996	La Silla	E. W. Elst	·	1.1 km	MPC · JPL
181760	1996 TJ_{67}	—	October 7, 1996	Kitt Peak	Spacewatch	KOR	2.0 km	MPC · JPL
181761	1996 VR_{2}	—	November 10, 1996	Sudbury	D. di Cicco	·	3.4 km	MPC · JPL
181762	1996 VX_{17}	—	November 6, 1996	Kitt Peak	Spacewatch	·	750 m	MPC · JPL
181763	1996 VR_{25}	—	November 10, 1996	Kitt Peak	Spacewatch	MAS	970 m	MPC · JPL
181764	1996 VH_{26}	—	November 10, 1996	Kitt Peak	Spacewatch	·	3.1 km	MPC · JPL
181765	1996 XL_{7}	—	December 1, 1996	Kitt Peak	Spacewatch	·	2.0 km	MPC · JPL
181766	1997 AW_{14}	—	January 12, 1997	Kleť	Kleť	·	1.1 km	MPC · JPL
181767	1997 CG_{7}	—	February 1, 1997	Kitt Peak	Spacewatch	·	3.6 km	MPC · JPL
181768	1997 CQ_{15}	—	February 6, 1997	Kitt Peak	Spacewatch	·	2.8 km	MPC · JPL
181769	1997 CR_{25}	—	February 13, 1997	Kitt Peak	Spacewatch	·	3.0 km	MPC · JPL
181770	1997 EF_{57}	—	March 10, 1997	La Silla	E. W. Elst	·	1.4 km	MPC · JPL
181771	1997 GG_{3}	—	April 5, 1997	Haleakala	NEAT	·	2.8 km	MPC · JPL
181772	1997 LS_{2}	—	June 6, 1997	Mauna Kea	Veillet, C.	EUN	1.6 km	MPC · JPL
181773	1997 LH_{5}	—	June 2, 1997	Kitt Peak	Spacewatch	L5	11 km	MPC · JPL
181774	1997 LK_{10}	—	June 7, 1997	La Silla	E. W. Elst	·	7.2 km	MPC · JPL
181775	1997 TW_{1}	—	October 3, 1997	Caussols	ODAS	·	1.6 km	MPC · JPL
181776	1997 TM_{6}	—	October 2, 1997	Caussols	ODAS	·	1.8 km	MPC · JPL
181777	1997 TN_{9}	—	October 2, 1997	Kitt Peak	Spacewatch	NEM	2.6 km	MPC · JPL
181778	1997 UN_{5}	—	October 21, 1997	Kitt Peak	Spacewatch	HIL · 3:2	7.9 km	MPC · JPL
181779	1997 US_{18}	—	October 28, 1997	Kitt Peak	Spacewatch	ADE	3.1 km	MPC · JPL
181780	1997 WH_{6}	—	November 23, 1997	Kitt Peak	Spacewatch	·	830 m	MPC · JPL
181781	1997 YG_{4}	—	December 23, 1997	Xinglong	SCAP	·	3.2 km	MPC · JPL
181782	1998 AO_{11}	—	January 2, 1998	Kitt Peak	Spacewatch	·	1.4 km	MPC · JPL
181783	1998 BV_{14}	—	January 25, 1998	Modra	A. Galád, A. Pravda	·	1.4 km	MPC · JPL
181784	1998 BO_{20}	—	January 22, 1998	Kitt Peak	Spacewatch	·	1.2 km	MPC · JPL
181785	1998 BK_{29}	—	January 25, 1998	Kitt Peak	Spacewatch	·	2.9 km	MPC · JPL
181786	1998 BY_{38}	—	January 29, 1998	Kitt Peak	Spacewatch	·	1.0 km	MPC · JPL
181787	1998 DF_{17}	—	February 23, 1998	Kitt Peak	Spacewatch	·	3.0 km	MPC · JPL
181788	1998 DZ_{17}	—	February 23, 1998	Kitt Peak	Spacewatch	·	890 m	MPC · JPL
181789	1998 DD_{23}	—	February 24, 1998	Kitt Peak	Spacewatch	AGN	1.9 km	MPC · JPL
181790	1998 DD_{26}	—	February 23, 1998	Kitt Peak	Spacewatch	KOR	2.2 km	MPC · JPL
181791	1998 EX_{9}	—	March 8, 1998	Xinglong	SCAP	·	1.0 km	MPC · JPL
181792	1998 FD_{39}	—	March 20, 1998	Socorro	LINEAR	·	2.2 km	MPC · JPL
181793	1998 HZ_{4}	—	April 18, 1998	Kitt Peak	Spacewatch	·	1.1 km	MPC · JPL
181794	1998 HF_{5}	—	April 22, 1998	Kitt Peak	Spacewatch	HYG	3.2 km	MPC · JPL
181795	1998 HU_{67}	—	April 21, 1998	Socorro	LINEAR	·	1.5 km	MPC · JPL
181796	1998 HN_{122}	—	April 23, 1998	Socorro	LINEAR	·	1.2 km	MPC · JPL
181797	1998 MR_{2}	—	June 19, 1998	Socorro	LINEAR	·	2.7 km	MPC · JPL
181798	1998 MJ_{40}	—	June 26, 1998	La Silla	E. W. Elst	·	2.4 km	MPC · JPL
181799	1998 OD_{4}	—	July 24, 1998	Caussols	ODAS	·	1.6 km	MPC · JPL
181800	1998 QZ_{4}	—	August 22, 1998	Xinglong	SCAP	·	4.7 km	MPC · JPL

== 181801–181900 ==
back to top

Designation			Discovery			Properties		Ref
Permanent	Provisional	Named after	Date	Site	Discoverer(s)	Category	Diam.	Ref
181801	1998 QD_{22}	—	August 17, 1998	Socorro	LINEAR	NYS	1.7 km	MPC · JPL
181802	1998 QZ_{27}	—	August 26, 1998	Kitt Peak	Spacewatch	·	4.9 km	MPC · JPL
181803	1998 QY_{73}	—	August 24, 1998	Socorro	LINEAR	·	7.4 km	MPC · JPL
181804	1998 QO_{81}	—	August 24, 1998	Socorro	LINEAR	TIR	4.7 km	MPC · JPL
181805	1998 QN_{88}	—	August 24, 1998	Socorro	LINEAR	·	7.1 km	MPC · JPL
181806	1998 QT_{95}	—	August 19, 1998	Socorro	LINEAR	·	1.7 km	MPC · JPL
181807	1998 QA_{97}	—	August 19, 1998	Socorro	LINEAR	·	5.8 km	MPC · JPL
181808	1998 QY_{106}	—	August 25, 1998	La Silla	E. W. Elst	·	2.2 km	MPC · JPL
181809	1998 RN_{4}	—	September 14, 1998	Socorro	LINEAR	·	1.8 km	MPC · JPL
181810	1998 RP_{14}	—	September 14, 1998	Kitt Peak	Spacewatch	·	1.1 km	MPC · JPL
181811	1998 RV_{14}	—	September 14, 1998	Kitt Peak	Spacewatch	(5)	1.2 km	MPC · JPL
181812	1998 RH_{24}	—	September 14, 1998	Socorro	LINEAR	·	1.3 km	MPC · JPL
181813	1998 RC_{33}	—	September 14, 1998	Socorro	LINEAR	V	980 m	MPC · JPL
181814	1998 RS_{41}	—	September 14, 1998	Socorro	LINEAR	V	1.3 km	MPC · JPL
181815	1998 RX_{43}	—	September 14, 1998	Socorro	LINEAR	·	2.0 km	MPC · JPL
181816	1998 RD_{55}	—	September 14, 1998	Socorro	LINEAR	·	2.1 km	MPC · JPL
181817	1998 RL_{58}	—	September 14, 1998	Socorro	LINEAR	·	2.9 km	MPC · JPL
181818	1998 RX_{58}	—	September 14, 1998	Socorro	LINEAR	·	1.8 km	MPC · JPL
181819	1998 RM_{66}	—	September 14, 1998	Socorro	LINEAR	·	3.9 km	MPC · JPL
181820	1998 SM_{2}	—	September 18, 1998	Caussols	ODAS	H	960 m	MPC · JPL
181821	1998 SV_{7}	—	September 20, 1998	Kitt Peak	Spacewatch	·	1.7 km	MPC · JPL
181822	1998 SQ_{9}	—	September 17, 1998	Xinglong	SCAP	·	2.3 km	MPC · JPL
181823	1998 SK_{12}	—	September 21, 1998	Višnjan Observatory	Višnjan	·	1.9 km	MPC · JPL
181824 Königsleiten	1998 SY_{35}	Königsleiten	September 24, 1998	Drebach	G. Lehmann, J. Kandler	NYS	1.7 km	MPC · JPL
181825	1998 SR_{39}	—	September 23, 1998	Kitt Peak	Spacewatch	·	5.4 km	MPC · JPL
181826	1998 SP_{49}	—	September 22, 1998	Bergisch Gladbach	W. Bickel	·	1.3 km	MPC · JPL
181827	1998 SS_{50}	—	September 26, 1998	Kitt Peak	Spacewatch	·	1.8 km	MPC · JPL
181828	1998 SU_{58}	—	September 17, 1998	Anderson Mesa	LONEOS	·	1.8 km	MPC · JPL
181829 Houyunde	1998 SY_{62}	Houyunde	September 25, 1998	Xinglong	SCAP	·	2.0 km	MPC · JPL
181830	1998 SG_{80}	—	September 26, 1998	Socorro	LINEAR	PHO	2.0 km	MPC · JPL
181831	1998 SE_{84}	—	September 26, 1998	Socorro	LINEAR	·	4.5 km	MPC · JPL
181832	1998 SZ_{87}	—	September 26, 1998	Socorro	LINEAR	·	1.9 km	MPC · JPL
181833	1998 SW_{112}	—	September 26, 1998	Socorro	LINEAR	·	1.8 km	MPC · JPL
181834	1998 SW_{116}	—	September 26, 1998	Socorro	LINEAR	·	2.2 km	MPC · JPL
181835	1998 SU_{125}	—	September 26, 1998	Socorro	LINEAR	·	2.2 km	MPC · JPL
181836	1998 SS_{149}	—	September 26, 1998	Socorro	LINEAR	·	5.6 km	MPC · JPL
181837	1998 SF_{160}	—	September 26, 1998	Socorro	LINEAR	·	7.0 km	MPC · JPL
181838	1998 SQ_{165}	—	September 18, 1998	Catalina	CSS	·	5.3 km	MPC · JPL
181839	1998 TM_{3}	—	October 14, 1998	Socorro	LINEAR	·	2.3 km	MPC · JPL
181840	1998 TS_{12}	—	October 13, 1998	Kitt Peak	Spacewatch	·	1.7 km	MPC · JPL
181841	1998 TD_{14}	—	October 14, 1998	Kitt Peak	Spacewatch	NYS	1.9 km	MPC · JPL
181842	1998 TF_{16}	—	October 15, 1998	Caussols	ODAS	·	1.9 km	MPC · JPL
181843	1998 TK_{20}	—	October 13, 1998	Kitt Peak	Spacewatch	·	2.2 km	MPC · JPL
181844	1998 TG_{29}	—	October 15, 1998	Kitt Peak	Spacewatch	·	2.1 km	MPC · JPL
181845	1998 TS_{31}	—	October 11, 1998	Anderson Mesa	LONEOS	·	2.1 km	MPC · JPL
181846	1998 UG_{2}	—	October 20, 1998	Caussols	ODAS	·	1.9 km	MPC · JPL
181847	1998 UG_{10}	—	October 16, 1998	Kitt Peak	Spacewatch	CYB	6.9 km	MPC · JPL
181848	1998 UT_{14}	—	October 23, 1998	Kitt Peak	Spacewatch	·	2.1 km	MPC · JPL
181849	1998 UM_{17}	—	October 17, 1998	Xinglong	SCAP	·	2.3 km	MPC · JPL
181850	1998 UA_{47}	—	October 24, 1998	Kitt Peak	Spacewatch	V	1.1 km	MPC · JPL
181851	1998 UX_{48}	—	October 17, 1998	Anderson Mesa	LONEOS	·	2.3 km	MPC · JPL
181852	1998 VF_{27}	—	November 10, 1998	Socorro	LINEAR	NYS	2.1 km	MPC · JPL
181853	1998 WT_{11}	—	November 21, 1998	Socorro	LINEAR	(5)	1.6 km	MPC · JPL
181854	1998 WT_{12}	—	November 21, 1998	Socorro	LINEAR	·	1.4 km	MPC · JPL
181855	1998 WT_{31}	—	November 18, 1998	Kitt Peak	M. W. Buie	cubewano (hot)	136 km	MPC · JPL
181856	1998 XV_{3}	—	December 9, 1998	Oizumi	T. Kobayashi	·	1.7 km	MPC · JPL
181857	1998 XH_{6}	—	December 8, 1998	Kitt Peak	Spacewatch	·	1.4 km	MPC · JPL
181858	1998 XE_{7}	—	December 8, 1998	Kitt Peak	Spacewatch	MAS	1.1 km	MPC · JPL
181859	1998 XM_{10}	—	December 8, 1998	Caussols	ODAS	·	3.5 km	MPC · JPL
181860	1998 XU_{20}	—	December 10, 1998	Kitt Peak	Spacewatch	·	2.2 km	MPC · JPL
181861	1998 XS_{33}	—	December 14, 1998	Socorro	LINEAR	·	3.2 km	MPC · JPL
181862	1998 XF_{46}	—	December 14, 1998	Socorro	LINEAR	·	2.6 km	MPC · JPL
181863	1998 XB_{100}	—	December 12, 1998	Socorro	LINEAR	·	3.6 km	MPC · JPL
181864	1999 AQ_{9}	—	January 10, 1999	Xinglong	SCAP	(5)	2.1 km	MPC · JPL
181865	1999 BP_{32}	—	January 19, 1999	Kitt Peak	Spacewatch	·	1.7 km	MPC · JPL
181866	1999 CU_{12}	—	February 14, 1999	Caussols	ODAS	·	3.0 km	MPC · JPL
181867	1999 CV_{118}	—	February 10, 1999	Mauna Kea	D. C. Jewitt, C. A. Trujillo, J. X. Luu	res · 3:7	121 km	MPC · JPL
181868	1999 CG_{119}	—	February 11, 1999	Mauna Kea	J. X. Luu, C. A. Trujillo, D. C. Jewitt	SDO	120 km	MPC · JPL
181869	1999 CA_{129}	—	February 11, 1999	Socorro	LINEAR	ADE	3.6 km	MPC · JPL
181870	1999 CJ_{145}	—	February 8, 1999	Kitt Peak	Spacewatch	·	2.8 km	MPC · JPL
181871	1999 CO_{153}	—	February 12, 1999	Mauna Kea	C. A. Trujillo, J. X. Luu, D. C. Jewitt	res · 4:7	128 km	MPC · JPL
181872 Cathaysa	1999 FL_{90}	Cathaysa	March 21, 1999	Apache Point	SDSS	·	2.9 km	MPC · JPL
181873	1999 GY_{12}	—	April 12, 1999	Kitt Peak	Spacewatch	·	3.0 km	MPC · JPL
181874	1999 HW_{11}	—	April 18, 1999	Kitt Peak	Kitt Peak	other TNO	158 km	MPC · JPL
181875	1999 JC_{131}	—	May 13, 1999	Socorro	LINEAR	·	1.4 km	MPC · JPL
181876	1999 JC_{135}	—	May 12, 1999	Socorro	LINEAR	·	2.8 km	MPC · JPL
181877	1999 LZ_{33}	—	June 11, 1999	Catalina	CSS	·	1.2 km	MPC · JPL
181878	1999 OT	—	July 17, 1999	Bergisch Gladbach	W. Bickel	·	3.3 km	MPC · JPL
181879	1999 PE_{2}	—	August 9, 1999	Prescott	P. G. Comba	·	1.1 km	MPC · JPL
181880	1999 PE_{7}	—	August 6, 1999	Cerro Tololo	Parker, J. W.	·	1.0 km	MPC · JPL
181881	1999 PB_{9}	—	August 8, 1999	Anderson Mesa	LONEOS	·	1.4 km	MPC · JPL
181882	1999 RF_{14}	—	September 7, 1999	Socorro	LINEAR	PHO	3.3 km	MPC · JPL
181883	1999 RO_{21}	—	September 7, 1999	Socorro	LINEAR	PHO	1.2 km	MPC · JPL
181884	1999 RS_{28}	—	September 8, 1999	Ondřejov	L. Kotková	·	2.6 km	MPC · JPL
181885	1999 RK_{32}	—	September 9, 1999	Višnjan Observatory	K. Korlević	·	1.1 km	MPC · JPL
181886	1999 RP_{32}	—	September 9, 1999	Eskridge	G. Bell, G. Hug	·	1.1 km	MPC · JPL
181887	1999 RB_{55}	—	September 7, 1999	Socorro	LINEAR	·	1.2 km	MPC · JPL
181888	1999 RQ_{73}	—	September 7, 1999	Socorro	LINEAR	·	920 m	MPC · JPL
181889	1999 RQ_{92}	—	September 7, 1999	Socorro	LINEAR	·	1.6 km	MPC · JPL
181890	1999 RP_{96}	—	September 7, 1999	Socorro	LINEAR	·	1.1 km	MPC · JPL
181891	1999 RD_{106}	—	September 8, 1999	Socorro	LINEAR	·	1.3 km	MPC · JPL
181892	1999 RY_{145}	—	September 9, 1999	Socorro	LINEAR	·	1.1 km	MPC · JPL
181893	1999 RC_{148}	—	September 9, 1999	Socorro	LINEAR	·	1.2 km	MPC · JPL
181894	1999 RN_{153}	—	September 9, 1999	Socorro	LINEAR	·	1.4 km	MPC · JPL
181895	1999 RM_{155}	—	September 9, 1999	Socorro	LINEAR	·	1.1 km	MPC · JPL
181896	1999 RN_{161}	—	September 9, 1999	Socorro	LINEAR	·	1.3 km	MPC · JPL
181897	1999 RK_{164}	—	September 9, 1999	Socorro	LINEAR	·	1.2 km	MPC · JPL
181898	1999 RS_{168}	—	September 9, 1999	Socorro	LINEAR	·	1.2 km	MPC · JPL
181899	1999 RM_{178}	—	September 9, 1999	Socorro	LINEAR	·	1.2 km	MPC · JPL
181900	1999 RX_{212}	—	September 9, 1999	Socorro	LINEAR	·	3.9 km	MPC · JPL

== 181901–182000 ==
back to top

Designation			Discovery			Properties		Ref
Permanent	Provisional	Named after	Date	Site	Discoverer(s)	Category	Diam.	Ref
181901	1999 RP_{214}	—	September 6, 1999	Anderson Mesa	LONEOS	·	950 m	MPC · JPL
181902	1999 RD_{215}	—	September 6, 1999	Mauna Kea	C. A. Trujillo, J. X. Luu, D. C. Jewitt	SDO	125 km	MPC · JPL
181903	1999 RE_{237}	—	September 8, 1999	Catalina	CSS	·	1.8 km	MPC · JPL
181904	1999 RN_{254}	—	September 8, 1999	Catalina	CSS	·	3.1 km	MPC · JPL
181905	1999 SR_{1}	—	September 20, 1999	Ondřejov	L. Kotková	·	1.1 km	MPC · JPL
181906	1999 SC_{4}	—	September 29, 1999	Višnjan Observatory	K. Korlević	·	3.2 km	MPC · JPL
181907	1999 SC_{14}	—	September 29, 1999	Catalina	CSS	·	1.7 km	MPC · JPL
181908	1999 SG_{19}	—	September 29, 1999	Catalina	CSS	·	1.5 km	MPC · JPL
181909	1999 TX_{15}	—	October 12, 1999	Ondřejov	P. Pravec, P. Kušnirák	·	3.8 km	MPC · JPL
181910	1999 TR_{34}	—	October 2, 1999	Socorro	LINEAR	PHO	3.0 km	MPC · JPL
181911	1999 TQ_{39}	—	October 3, 1999	Catalina	CSS	·	3.9 km	MPC · JPL
181912	1999 TP_{41}	—	October 2, 1999	Kitt Peak	Spacewatch	NYS	1.4 km	MPC · JPL
181913	1999 TS_{44}	—	October 3, 1999	Kitt Peak	Spacewatch	·	1.1 km	MPC · JPL
181914	1999 TZ_{46}	—	October 4, 1999	Kitt Peak	Spacewatch	NYS	970 m	MPC · JPL
181915	1999 TY_{51}	—	October 4, 1999	Kitt Peak	Spacewatch	EOS	4.2 km	MPC · JPL
181916	1999 TH_{53}	—	October 6, 1999	Kitt Peak	Spacewatch	·	3.6 km	MPC · JPL
181917	1999 TP_{71}	—	October 9, 1999	Kitt Peak	Spacewatch	THM	2.9 km	MPC · JPL
181918	1999 TL_{74}	—	October 10, 1999	Kitt Peak	Spacewatch	·	970 m	MPC · JPL
181919	1999 TZ_{76}	—	October 10, 1999	Kitt Peak	Spacewatch	·	1.5 km	MPC · JPL
181920	1999 TN_{79}	—	October 11, 1999	Kitt Peak	Spacewatch	·	3.4 km	MPC · JPL
181921	1999 TQ_{79}	—	October 11, 1999	Kitt Peak	Spacewatch	HYG	3.4 km	MPC · JPL
181922	1999 TQ_{80}	—	October 11, 1999	Kitt Peak	Spacewatch	·	1.2 km	MPC · JPL
181923	1999 TD_{105}	—	October 3, 1999	Socorro	LINEAR	·	1.7 km	MPC · JPL
181924	1999 TW_{115}	—	October 4, 1999	Socorro	LINEAR	·	2.3 km	MPC · JPL
181925	1999 TW_{117}	—	October 4, 1999	Socorro	LINEAR	·	4.2 km	MPC · JPL
181926	1999 TT_{130}	—	October 6, 1999	Socorro	LINEAR	·	1.1 km	MPC · JPL
181927	1999 TM_{133}	—	October 6, 1999	Socorro	LINEAR	·	3.1 km	MPC · JPL
181928	1999 TE_{134}	—	October 6, 1999	Socorro	LINEAR	·	1.3 km	MPC · JPL
181929	1999 TR_{134}	—	October 6, 1999	Socorro	LINEAR	EOS	3.0 km	MPC · JPL
181930	1999 TD_{136}	—	October 6, 1999	Socorro	LINEAR	EUP	7.6 km	MPC · JPL
181931	1999 TJ_{138}	—	October 6, 1999	Socorro	LINEAR	·	5.1 km	MPC · JPL
181932	1999 TY_{138}	—	October 6, 1999	Socorro	LINEAR	·	1.1 km	MPC · JPL
181933	1999 TD_{142}	—	October 7, 1999	Socorro	LINEAR	·	1.2 km	MPC · JPL
181934	1999 TM_{144}	—	October 7, 1999	Socorro	LINEAR	·	1.0 km	MPC · JPL
181935	1999 TS_{155}	—	October 7, 1999	Socorro	LINEAR	·	1.2 km	MPC · JPL
181936	1999 TC_{158}	—	October 7, 1999	Socorro	LINEAR	NYS	1.1 km	MPC · JPL
181937	1999 TX_{159}	—	October 9, 1999	Socorro	LINEAR	EOS	2.6 km	MPC · JPL
181938	1999 TB_{161}	—	October 9, 1999	Socorro	LINEAR	VER	5.3 km	MPC · JPL
181939	1999 TQ_{163}	—	October 9, 1999	Socorro	LINEAR	·	3.4 km	MPC · JPL
181940	1999 TJ_{169}	—	October 10, 1999	Socorro	LINEAR	3:2	8.1 km	MPC · JPL
181941	1999 TT_{173}	—	October 10, 1999	Socorro	LINEAR	HYG	5.5 km	MPC · JPL
181942	1999 TZ_{176}	—	October 10, 1999	Socorro	LINEAR	·	1.4 km	MPC · JPL
181943	1999 TT_{179}	—	October 10, 1999	Socorro	LINEAR	·	4.4 km	MPC · JPL
181944	1999 TN_{180}	—	October 10, 1999	Socorro	LINEAR	NYS	2.1 km	MPC · JPL
181945	1999 TC_{202}	—	October 13, 1999	Socorro	LINEAR	·	1.1 km	MPC · JPL
181946	1999 TM_{203}	—	October 13, 1999	Socorro	LINEAR	·	1.8 km	MPC · JPL
181947	1999 TG_{215}	—	October 15, 1999	Socorro	LINEAR	·	5.2 km	MPC · JPL
181948	1999 TP_{216}	—	October 15, 1999	Socorro	LINEAR	·	1.6 km	MPC · JPL
181949	1999 TF_{219}	—	October 1, 1999	Catalina	CSS	·	1.1 km	MPC · JPL
181950	1999 TB_{226}	—	October 2, 1999	Kitt Peak	Spacewatch	·	4.8 km	MPC · JPL
181951	1999 TA_{228}	—	October 1, 1999	Kitt Peak	Spacewatch	·	1.2 km	MPC · JPL
181952	1999 TL_{231}	—	October 5, 1999	Catalina	CSS	·	1.4 km	MPC · JPL
181953	1999 TH_{245}	—	October 7, 1999	Catalina	CSS	HYG	5.4 km	MPC · JPL
181954	1999 TT_{263}	—	October 15, 1999	Kitt Peak	Spacewatch	·	1.0 km	MPC · JPL
181955	1999 TE_{272}	—	October 3, 1999	Socorro	LINEAR	·	1.2 km	MPC · JPL
181956	1999 TV_{287}	—	October 10, 1999	Socorro	LINEAR	·	910 m	MPC · JPL
181957	1999 TA_{289}	—	October 10, 1999	Socorro	LINEAR	·	1.0 km	MPC · JPL
181958	1999 UL_{7}	—	October 30, 1999	Socorro	LINEAR	·	2.4 km	MPC · JPL
181959	1999 UG_{21}	—	October 31, 1999	Kitt Peak	Spacewatch	·	1 km	MPC · JPL
181960	1999 UM_{24}	—	October 28, 1999	Catalina	CSS	(1101)	7.5 km	MPC · JPL
181961	1999 UA_{31}	—	October 31, 1999	Kitt Peak	Spacewatch	·	810 m	MPC · JPL
181962	1999 UU_{35}	—	October 31, 1999	Kitt Peak	Spacewatch	·	1.1 km	MPC · JPL
181963	1999 UO_{37}	—	October 16, 1999	Kitt Peak	Spacewatch	·	3.9 km	MPC · JPL
181964	1999 UE_{40}	—	October 16, 1999	Socorro	LINEAR	·	6.9 km	MPC · JPL
181965	1999 UN_{41}	—	October 18, 1999	Kitt Peak	Spacewatch	V	1 km	MPC · JPL
181966	1999 UA_{42}	—	October 20, 1999	Socorro	LINEAR	·	1.7 km	MPC · JPL
181967	1999 UW_{47}	—	October 30, 1999	Catalina	CSS	·	1.1 km	MPC · JPL
181968	1999 UW_{58}	—	October 30, 1999	Socorro	LINEAR	TIR	5.4 km	MPC · JPL
181969	1999 VU_{14}	—	November 2, 1999	Kitt Peak	Spacewatch	·	900 m	MPC · JPL
181970	1999 VF_{17}	—	November 2, 1999	Kitt Peak	Spacewatch	·	980 m	MPC · JPL
181971	1999 VM_{17}	—	November 2, 1999	Kitt Peak	Spacewatch	NYS	1.2 km	MPC · JPL
181972	1999 VD_{21}	—	November 12, 1999	Farra d'Isonzo	Farra d'Isonzo	NYS	1.3 km	MPC · JPL
181973	1999 VS_{26}	—	November 3, 1999	Socorro	LINEAR	·	3.6 km	MPC · JPL
181974	1999 VJ_{30}	—	November 3, 1999	Socorro	LINEAR	·	1.3 km	MPC · JPL
181975	1999 VK_{35}	—	November 3, 1999	Socorro	LINEAR	NYS · slow	1.9 km	MPC · JPL
181976	1999 VK_{45}	—	November 4, 1999	Catalina	CSS	NYS	1.6 km	MPC · JPL
181977	1999 VJ_{64}	—	November 4, 1999	Socorro	LINEAR	·	3.8 km	MPC · JPL
181978	1999 VV_{66}	—	November 4, 1999	Socorro	LINEAR	·	5.1 km	MPC · JPL
181979	1999 VZ_{66}	—	November 4, 1999	Socorro	LINEAR	·	1.3 km	MPC · JPL
181980	1999 VZ_{69}	—	November 4, 1999	Socorro	LINEAR	NYS	1.3 km	MPC · JPL
181981	1999 VC_{71}	—	November 4, 1999	Socorro	LINEAR	·	3.5 km	MPC · JPL
181982	1999 VO_{74}	—	November 5, 1999	Kitt Peak	Spacewatch	HYG	4.3 km	MPC · JPL
181983	1999 VO_{80}	—	November 4, 1999	Socorro	LINEAR	·	2.5 km	MPC · JPL
181984	1999 VF_{82}	—	November 5, 1999	Socorro	LINEAR	·	1.8 km	MPC · JPL
181985	1999 VW_{95}	—	November 9, 1999	Socorro	LINEAR	·	1.0 km	MPC · JPL
181986	1999 VR_{104}	—	November 9, 1999	Socorro	LINEAR	THM	3.4 km	MPC · JPL
181987	1999 VQ_{108}	—	November 9, 1999	Socorro	LINEAR	·	1.4 km	MPC · JPL
181988	1999 VF_{110}	—	November 9, 1999	Socorro	LINEAR	NYS	1.3 km	MPC · JPL
181989	1999 VW_{111}	—	November 9, 1999	Socorro	LINEAR	·	1.5 km	MPC · JPL
181990	1999 VG_{113}	—	November 9, 1999	Socorro	LINEAR	·	1.2 km	MPC · JPL
181991	1999 VH_{121}	—	November 4, 1999	Kitt Peak	Spacewatch	NYS	1.2 km	MPC · JPL
181992	1999 VZ_{125}	—	November 9, 1999	Kitt Peak	Spacewatch	VER	4.0 km	MPC · JPL
181993	1999 VP_{130}	—	November 9, 1999	Kitt Peak	Spacewatch	HYG	4.2 km	MPC · JPL
181994	1999 VO_{161}	—	November 14, 1999	Socorro	LINEAR	·	1.4 km	MPC · JPL
181995	1999 VV_{165}	—	November 14, 1999	Socorro	LINEAR	·	1.9 km	MPC · JPL
181996	1999 VQ_{167}	—	November 14, 1999	Socorro	LINEAR	·	1.4 km	MPC · JPL
181997	1999 VR_{180}	—	November 6, 1999	Socorro	LINEAR	PHO	1.1 km	MPC · JPL
181998	1999 VC_{212}	—	November 12, 1999	Socorro	LINEAR	·	1.2 km	MPC · JPL
181999	1999 WG_{15}	—	November 29, 1999	Kitt Peak	Spacewatch	·	960 m	MPC · JPL
182000	1999 WX_{20}	—	November 16, 1999	Kitt Peak	Spacewatch	·	5.0 km	MPC · JPL

back to top

== See also ==
- Meanings of minor-planet names: 181001–182000
