= Meanings of minor-planet names: 178001–179000 =

As minor planet discoveries are confirmed, they are given a permanent number by the IAU's Minor Planet Center (MPC), and the discoverers can then submit names for them, following the IAU's naming conventions. The list below concerns those minor planets in the specified number-range that have received names, and explains the meanings of those names.

Official naming citations of newly named small Solar System bodies are approved and published in a bulletin by IAU's Working Group for Small Bodies Nomenclature (WGSBN). Before May 2021, citations were published in MPC's Minor Planet Circulars for many decades. Recent citations can also be found on the JPL Small-Body Database (SBDB). Until his death in 2016, German astronomer Lutz D. Schmadel compiled these citations into the Dictionary of Minor Planet Names (DMP) and regularly updated the collection.

Based on Paul Herget's The Names of the Minor Planets, Schmadel also researched the unclear origin of numerous asteroids, most of which had been named prior to World War II. This article incorporates text from this source, which is in the public domain: SBDB New namings may only be added to this list below after official publication as the preannouncement of names is condemned. The WGSBN publishes a comprehensive guideline for the naming rules of non-cometary small Solar System bodies.

== 178001–178100 ==
Named minor planet	Provisional	This minor planet was named for...	Ref · Catalog
178008 Picard	2006 QQ_{137}	Claude Picard (1942–2008), a French engineer and astronomer, creator of the Commission Cosmologie of the Societé Astronomique de France	JPL · 178008
178014 Meslay	2006 RG	Christiane Meslay (1957–2019) was a French computer engineer, who introduced the first local Ethernet network at the Dax Observatory (958) in 1996. This allowed for the discovery of comet C/1997 J2 (Meunier–Dupouy) via remote control of the telescope and CCD.	IAU · 178014
178088 Marktovey	2006 SY_{197}	Mark Alexander Tovey (b. 1970), an amateur astronomer and Adjunct Research Professor in History at Western University in London, Canada.	IAU · 178088

== 178101–178200 ==
back to top

Named minor planet	Provisional	This minor planet was named for...	Ref · Catalog
178113 Benjamindilday	2006 SA_{381}	Benjamin Dilday (born 1975), an American Astronomer with the Sloan Digital Sky Survey	JPL · 178113
178150 Taiyuinkwei	2006 TN_{92}	Tai Yuin-Kwei (1897–1982), a Taiwanese physicist and educator who set up the National Taiwan University Department of Physics and the Graduate Inst of Geophysics, National Central University	JPL · 178150
178151 Kulangsu	2006 TO_{92}	The Chinese island of Kulangsu (Gulangyu), located off the southwestern coast of the city of Xiamen	JPL · 178151
178155 Kenzaarraki	2006 TN_{117}	Kenza Arraki (born 1988), an American astronomer who discovered asteroids as an undergraduate using data from the Sloan Digital Sky Survey	JPL · 178155
178156 Borbála	2006 UL_{1}	Borbála Ujhelyi (born 1982), wife of the Hungarian astronomer Zoltán Kuli who co-discovered this minor planet	JPL · 178156

== 178201–178300 ==
back to top

Named minor planet	Provisional	This minor planet was named for...	Ref · Catalog
178226 Rebeccalouise	2006 VP_{156}	Rebecca Louise Puckett (born 1976), née Ramsay, wife of discovery team member Andrew W. Puckett, because it was discovered three days before their first wedding anniversary	JPL · 178226
178243 Schaerding	2006 YH_{13}	Schärding, Upper Austria, home town of the discoverer Richard Gierlinger	JPL · 178243
178256 Juanmi	2007 VR_{102}	Juan Miguel Lacruz Camblor (born 1988), son of Spanish astronomer Juan Lacruz who discovered this minor planet	JPL · 178256
178263 Wienphilo	2007 WV_{55}	The Vienna Philharmonic, a world-renowned orchestra based in Vienna, Austria	JPL · 178263
178267 Sarajevo	2007 YG_{59}	Sarajevo, the capital and largest city of Bosnia and Herzegovina.	JPL · 178267
178294 Wertheimer	1990 TA_{12}	Egon Ranshofen-Wertheimer (1894–1957), an Austrian diplomat, journalist and historian, involved in the establishment of the United Nations	JPL · 178294

== 178301–178400 ==
back to top

Named minor planet	Provisional	This minor planet was named for...	Ref · Catalog
178383 Teruel	1997 PD_{4}	Teruel, Spanish city that is a UNESCO World Heritage Site.	IAU · 178383

== 178401–178500 ==
back to top

Named minor planet	Provisional	This minor planet was named for...	Ref · Catalog
There are no named minor planets in this number range

== 178501–178600 ==
back to top

Named minor planet	Provisional	This minor planet was named for...	Ref · Catalog
178534 Mosheelitzur	1999 TO_{333}	Moshe Elitzur (born 1944), an American physicist and emeritus professor at the University of Kentucky, who has significantly contributed to the theories of maser and dust radiation transfer in astrophysical environments.	IAU · 178534

== 178601–178700 ==
back to top

Named minor planet	Provisional	This minor planet was named for...	Ref · Catalog
178603 Pinkine	2000 CV_{107}	Nickalaus Pinkine (born 1967), a manager at the Johns Hopkins University Applied Physics Laboratory, who worked as a Deputy Mission Operations Manager on the New Horizons mission to Pluto	JPL · 178603
178679 Piquette	2000 QT_{247}	Marcus R. Piquette (born 1990), a graduate student researcher at the University of Colorado, who worked on the Student Dust Counter instrument for the New Horizons mission to Pluto	JPL · 178679

== 178701–178800 ==
back to top

Named minor planet	Provisional	This minor planet was named for...	Ref · Catalog
178796 Posztoczky	2001 DQ_{86}	Károly Posztoczky (1882–1963), Hungarian landowner and amateur astronomer	JPL · 178796

== 178801–178900 ==
back to top

Named minor planet	Provisional	This minor planet was named for...	Ref · Catalog
178803 Kristenjohnson	2001 FA_{4}	Kristen Johnson (born 1985), American officer of the Foundation for Blind Children in Phoenix, Arizona, and of the National Federation of the Blind, and daughter of astronomer Wayne Johnson	JPL · 178803
178830 Anne-Véronique	2001 HT	Anne-Véronique Hernandez (born 1969) is the wife of astronomer Michel Hernandez, one of this minor planet's discoverers at Observatory of Saint-Veran, France	JPL · 178830

== 178901–179000 ==
back to top

Named minor planet	Provisional	This minor planet was named for...	Ref · Catalog
178987 Jillianredfern	2001 QD_{306}	Jillian A. Redfern (born 1979), a Manager for Research and Development at the Southwest Research Institute, who worked with the Alice UV Spectrometer Instrument on the New Horizons mission to Pluto	JPL · 178987

back to top

Preceded by 177,001–178,000	Meanings of minor-planet names List of minor planets: 178,001–179,000	Succeeded by 179,001–180,000
