= List of minor planets: 178001–179000 =

The following is a partial list of minor planets, running from minor-planet number 178001 through 179000, inclusive. The primary data for this and other partial lists is based on JPL's "Small-Body Orbital Elements" and data available from the Minor Planet Center. Critical list information is also provided by the MPC, unless otherwise specified from Lowell Observatory. A detailed description of the table's columns and additional sources are given on the main page including a complete list of every page in this series, and a statistical break-up on the dynamical classification of minor planets.

Also see the summary list of all named bodies in numerical and alphabetical order, and the corresponding naming citations for the number range of this particular list. New namings may only be added to this list after official publication, as the preannouncement of names is condemned by the Working Group for Small Bodies Nomenclature of the International Astronomical Union.

Near-Earth obj.	MBA (inner)	MBA (outer)	Centaur
Mars-crosser	MBA (middle)	Jupiter trojan	Trans-Neptunian obj.
Unclassified

== 178001–178100 ==
Designation			Discovery			Properties		Ref
Permanent	Provisional	Named after	Date	Site	Discoverer(s)	Category	Diam.	Ref
178001	2006 QK_{120}	—	August 29, 2006	Catalina	CSS	EMA	5.0 km	MPC · JPL
178002	2006 QR_{122}	—	August 29, 2006	Catalina	CSS	INA	5.4 km	MPC · JPL
178003	2006 QV_{125}	—	August 16, 2006	Palomar	NEAT	·	2.2 km	MPC · JPL
178004	2006 QK_{127}	—	August 16, 2006	Siding Spring	SSS	·	3.9 km	MPC · JPL
178005	2006 QD_{128}	—	August 17, 2006	Palomar	NEAT	·	2.8 km	MPC · JPL
178006	2006 QH_{135}	—	August 27, 2006	Anderson Mesa	LONEOS	·	2.1 km	MPC · JPL
178007	2006 QX_{136}	—	August 16, 2006	Palomar	NEAT	·	2.6 km	MPC · JPL
178008 Picard	2006 QQ_{137}	Picard	August 30, 2006	Saint-Sulpice	B. Christophe	·	3.5 km	MPC · JPL
178009	2006 QC_{146}	—	August 18, 2006	Kitt Peak	Spacewatch	·	1.7 km	MPC · JPL
178010	2006 QJ_{149}	—	August 18, 2006	Kitt Peak	Spacewatch	·	2.6 km	MPC · JPL
178011	2006 QC_{162}	—	August 20, 2006	Kitt Peak	Spacewatch	·	1.8 km	MPC · JPL
178012	2006 QY_{163}	—	August 29, 2006	Catalina	CSS	·	3.4 km	MPC · JPL
178013	2006 QP_{166}	—	August 29, 2006	Anderson Mesa	LONEOS	V	850 m	MPC · JPL
178014 Meslay	2006 RG	Meslay	September 1, 2006	Ottmarsheim	C. Rinner	EOS	4.2 km	MPC · JPL
178015	2006 RW_{3}	—	September 12, 2006	Catalina	CSS	·	1.4 km	MPC · JPL
178016	2006 RU_{6}	—	September 14, 2006	Catalina	CSS	·	3.0 km	MPC · JPL
178017	2006 RH_{8}	—	September 12, 2006	Catalina	CSS	·	1.3 km	MPC · JPL
178018	2006 RN_{8}	—	September 12, 2006	Catalina	CSS	·	880 m	MPC · JPL
178019	2006 RC_{9}	—	September 12, 2006	Catalina	CSS	MAS	1.2 km	MPC · JPL
178020	2006 RL_{16}	—	September 14, 2006	Palomar	NEAT	·	1.3 km	MPC · JPL
178021	2006 RX_{19}	—	September 15, 2006	Kitt Peak	Spacewatch	·	2.5 km	MPC · JPL
178022	2006 RE_{22}	—	September 15, 2006	Palomar	NEAT	·	2.0 km	MPC · JPL
178023	2006 RZ_{26}	—	September 14, 2006	Catalina	CSS	·	980 m	MPC · JPL
178024	2006 RU_{30}	—	September 15, 2006	Kitt Peak	Spacewatch	·	2.9 km	MPC · JPL
178025	2006 RN_{31}	—	September 15, 2006	Kitt Peak	Spacewatch	·	2.3 km	MPC · JPL
178026	2006 RU_{34}	—	September 13, 2006	Palomar	NEAT	·	4.2 km	MPC · JPL
178027	2006 RF_{41}	—	September 14, 2006	Catalina	CSS	PHO	1.6 km	MPC · JPL
178028	2006 RO_{44}	—	September 14, 2006	Kitt Peak	Spacewatch	·	870 m	MPC · JPL
178029	2006 RC_{48}	—	September 14, 2006	Catalina	CSS	·	1.1 km	MPC · JPL
178030	2006 RA_{50}	—	September 14, 2006	Kitt Peak	Spacewatch	·	1.6 km	MPC · JPL
178031	2006 RG_{52}	—	September 14, 2006	Kitt Peak	Spacewatch	·	2.8 km	MPC · JPL
178032	2006 RY_{52}	—	September 14, 2006	Kitt Peak	Spacewatch	·	3.6 km	MPC · JPL
178033	2006 RR_{55}	—	September 14, 2006	Kitt Peak	Spacewatch	THM	3.1 km	MPC · JPL
178034	2006 RT_{57}	—	September 15, 2006	Kitt Peak	Spacewatch	·	1.7 km	MPC · JPL
178035	2006 RG_{60}	—	September 15, 2006	Kitt Peak	Spacewatch	·	3.7 km	MPC · JPL
178036	2006 RW_{63}	—	September 15, 2006	Catalina	CSS	V	1.2 km	MPC · JPL
178037	2006 RA_{66}	—	September 14, 2006	Kitt Peak	Spacewatch	·	1.4 km	MPC · JPL
178038	2006 RH_{66}	—	September 14, 2006	Palomar	NEAT	·	1.9 km	MPC · JPL
178039	2006 RH_{68}	—	September 15, 2006	Kitt Peak	Spacewatch	·	1.8 km	MPC · JPL
178040	2006 RY_{69}	—	September 15, 2006	Kitt Peak	Spacewatch	·	1.1 km	MPC · JPL
178041	2006 RC_{75}	—	September 15, 2006	Kitt Peak	Spacewatch	V	820 m	MPC · JPL
178042	2006 RV_{77}	—	September 15, 2006	Kitt Peak	Spacewatch	HOF	3.1 km	MPC · JPL
178043	2006 RP_{91}	—	September 15, 2006	Kitt Peak	Spacewatch	·	1.7 km	MPC · JPL
178044	2006 RT_{92}	—	September 15, 2006	Kitt Peak	Spacewatch	·	1.9 km	MPC · JPL
178045	2006 RC_{93}	—	September 15, 2006	Kitt Peak	Spacewatch	·	1.7 km	MPC · JPL
178046	2006 RA_{94}	—	September 15, 2006	Kitt Peak	Spacewatch	·	2.6 km	MPC · JPL
178047	2006 RB_{95}	—	September 15, 2006	Kitt Peak	Spacewatch	·	2.6 km	MPC · JPL
178048	2006 RA_{97}	—	September 15, 2006	Kitt Peak	Spacewatch	NYS	2.2 km	MPC · JPL
178049	2006 RL_{99}	—	September 14, 2006	Kitt Peak	Spacewatch	·	2.5 km	MPC · JPL
178050	2006 RB_{105}	—	September 15, 2006	Kitt Peak	Spacewatch	·	910 m	MPC · JPL
178051	2006 SC_{5}	—	September 16, 2006	Palomar	NEAT	·	2.8 km	MPC · JPL
178052	2006 SY_{7}	—	September 16, 2006	Socorro	LINEAR	·	3.4 km	MPC · JPL
178053	2006 SV_{11}	—	September 16, 2006	Catalina	CSS	·	1.8 km	MPC · JPL
178054	2006 SM_{14}	—	September 17, 2006	Catalina	CSS	·	2.7 km	MPC · JPL
178055	2006 SU_{16}	—	September 17, 2006	Kitt Peak	Spacewatch	·	1.5 km	MPC · JPL
178056	2006 SY_{23}	—	September 18, 2006	Anderson Mesa	LONEOS	·	2.4 km	MPC · JPL
178057	2006 SH_{26}	—	September 16, 2006	Catalina	CSS	·	2.1 km	MPC · JPL
178058	2006 ST_{29}	—	September 17, 2006	Kitt Peak	Spacewatch	·	1.0 km	MPC · JPL
178059	2006 SJ_{32}	—	September 17, 2006	Kitt Peak	Spacewatch	·	4.0 km	MPC · JPL
178060	2006 SN_{36}	—	September 17, 2006	Anderson Mesa	LONEOS	·	1.3 km	MPC · JPL
178061	2006 SR_{36}	—	September 17, 2006	Anderson Mesa	LONEOS	V	1.3 km	MPC · JPL
178062	2006 SN_{38}	—	September 18, 2006	Kitt Peak	Spacewatch	·	1.7 km	MPC · JPL
178063	2006 SN_{42}	—	September 18, 2006	Anderson Mesa	LONEOS	·	4.1 km	MPC · JPL
178064	2006 SB_{62}	—	September 18, 2006	Catalina	CSS	·	3.5 km	MPC · JPL
178065	2006 SX_{63}	—	September 20, 2006	Palomar	NEAT	·	2.7 km	MPC · JPL
178066	2006 SF_{64}	—	September 22, 2006	RAS	Lowe, A.	·	2.1 km	MPC · JPL
178067	2006 SU_{71}	—	September 19, 2006	Kitt Peak	Spacewatch	·	3.9 km	MPC · JPL
178068	2006 SY_{76}	—	September 20, 2006	Socorro	LINEAR	·	2.7 km	MPC · JPL
178069	2006 SN_{90}	—	September 18, 2006	Kitt Peak	Spacewatch	NYS	1.5 km	MPC · JPL
178070	2006 SC_{92}	—	September 18, 2006	Kitt Peak	Spacewatch	·	2.0 km	MPC · JPL
178071	2006 SA_{96}	—	September 18, 2006	Kitt Peak	Spacewatch	·	1.8 km	MPC · JPL
178072	2006 SX_{97}	—	September 18, 2006	Kitt Peak	Spacewatch	·	1.6 km	MPC · JPL
178073	2006 SH_{98}	—	September 18, 2006	Kitt Peak	Spacewatch	HOF	3.1 km	MPC · JPL
178074	2006 SG_{104}	—	September 19, 2006	Kitt Peak	Spacewatch	·	1.9 km	MPC · JPL
178075	2006 SE_{112}	—	September 22, 2006	Catalina	CSS	·	4.8 km	MPC · JPL
178076	2006 SV_{117}	—	September 24, 2006	Kitt Peak	Spacewatch	·	3.9 km	MPC · JPL
178077	2006 ST_{127}	—	September 24, 2006	Anderson Mesa	LONEOS	·	3.2 km	MPC · JPL
178078	2006 SF_{131}	—	September 25, 2006	RAS	Lowe, A.	EUN	1.5 km	MPC · JPL
178079	2006 SJ_{131}	—	September 25, 2006	Desert Moon	Stevens, B. L.	·	4.1 km	MPC · JPL
178080	2006 SL_{152}	—	September 19, 2006	Kitt Peak	Spacewatch	·	1.4 km	MPC · JPL
178081	2006 SM_{157}	—	September 23, 2006	Kitt Peak	Spacewatch	·	1.1 km	MPC · JPL
178082	2006 SG_{160}	—	September 23, 2006	Kitt Peak	Spacewatch	·	3.6 km	MPC · JPL
178083	2006 SR_{168}	—	September 25, 2006	Kitt Peak	Spacewatch	LIX	3.9 km	MPC · JPL
178084	2006 SP_{170}	—	September 25, 2006	Kitt Peak	Spacewatch	NYS	1.6 km	MPC · JPL
178085	2006 ST_{178}	—	September 25, 2006	Mount Lemmon	Mount Lemmon Survey	THM	2.5 km	MPC · JPL
178086	2006 SZ_{192}	—	September 26, 2006	Mount Lemmon	Mount Lemmon Survey	·	2.1 km	MPC · JPL
178087	2006 SY_{196}	—	September 26, 2006	Catalina	CSS	EUN	1.6 km	MPC · JPL
178088 Marktovey	2006 SY_{197}	Marktovey	September 27, 2006	Jarnac	Glinos, T.	·	3.2 km	MPC · JPL
178089	2006 SY_{199}	—	September 24, 2006	Kitt Peak	Spacewatch	V	1.0 km	MPC · JPL
178090	2006 SO_{212}	—	September 26, 2006	Kitt Peak	Spacewatch	·	3.1 km	MPC · JPL
178091	2006 SB_{213}	—	September 26, 2006	Catalina	CSS	·	3.6 km	MPC · JPL
178092	2006 SD_{213}	—	September 26, 2006	Catalina	CSS	·	5.2 km	MPC · JPL
178093	2006 SP_{214}	—	September 27, 2006	Kitt Peak	Spacewatch	·	2.9 km	MPC · JPL
178094	2006 SS_{218}	—	September 29, 2006	Kitami	K. Endate	TEL	2.0 km	MPC · JPL
178095	2006 SD_{221}	—	September 25, 2006	Mount Lemmon	Mount Lemmon Survey	·	790 m	MPC · JPL
178096	2006 SY_{227}	—	September 26, 2006	Kitt Peak	Spacewatch	LIX	4.2 km	MPC · JPL
178097	2006 SL_{230}	—	September 26, 2006	Socorro	LINEAR	·	3.1 km	MPC · JPL
178098	2006 SK_{231}	—	September 26, 2006	Kitt Peak	Spacewatch	·	1.7 km	MPC · JPL
178099	2006 SZ_{235}	—	September 26, 2006	Socorro	LINEAR	EOS	3.0 km	MPC · JPL
178100	2006 SP_{251}	—	September 26, 2006	Kitt Peak	Spacewatch	·	1.6 km	MPC · JPL

== 178101–178200 ==
back to top

Designation			Discovery			Properties		Ref
Permanent	Provisional	Named after	Date	Site	Discoverer(s)	Category	Diam.	Ref
178101	2006 ST_{256}	—	September 26, 2006	Kitt Peak	Spacewatch	AGN	1.5 km	MPC · JPL
178102	2006 SJ_{278}	—	September 28, 2006	Mount Lemmon	Mount Lemmon Survey	V	680 m	MPC · JPL
178103	2006 SH_{280}	—	September 29, 2006	Anderson Mesa	LONEOS	HYG	3.9 km	MPC · JPL
178104	2006 SJ_{281}	—	September 30, 2006	Siding Spring	SSS	T_{j} (2.9)	5.1 km	MPC · JPL
178105	2006 SC_{284}	—	September 26, 2006	Catalina	CSS	·	2.8 km	MPC · JPL
178106	2006 SD_{286}	—	September 19, 2006	Catalina	CSS	·	1.9 km	MPC · JPL
178107	2006 SL_{300}	—	September 26, 2006	Catalina	CSS	·	1.7 km	MPC · JPL
178108	2006 SV_{312}	—	September 27, 2006	Kitt Peak	Spacewatch	V	940 m	MPC · JPL
178109	2006 SN_{313}	—	September 27, 2006	Kitt Peak	Spacewatch	·	1.6 km	MPC · JPL
178110	2006 SN_{328}	—	September 27, 2006	Kitt Peak	Spacewatch	·	1.7 km	MPC · JPL
178111	2006 SU_{328}	—	September 27, 2006	Kitt Peak	Spacewatch	·	1.3 km	MPC · JPL
178112	2006 SZ_{366}	—	September 20, 2006	Anderson Mesa	LONEOS	V	1.1 km	MPC · JPL
178113 Benjamindilday	2006 SA_{381}	Benjamindilday	September 27, 2006	Apache Point	A. C. Becker	·	4.2 km	MPC · JPL
178114	2006 SA_{391}	—	September 17, 2006	Catalina	CSS	EOS	2.8 km	MPC · JPL
178115	2006 SB_{393}	—	September 27, 2006	Catalina	CSS	·	5.8 km	MPC · JPL
178116	2006 TK_{7}	—	October 10, 2006	Gnosca	S. Sposetti	·	2.8 km	MPC · JPL
178117	2006 TG_{8}	—	October 4, 2006	Mount Lemmon	Mount Lemmon Survey	·	2.5 km	MPC · JPL
178118	2006 TD_{12}	—	October 3, 2006	Kitt Peak	Spacewatch	NYS	1.4 km	MPC · JPL
178119	2006 TX_{18}	—	October 11, 2006	Kitt Peak	Spacewatch	EOS	2.8 km	MPC · JPL
178120	2006 TU_{24}	—	October 12, 2006	Palomar	NEAT	MAR	1.4 km	MPC · JPL
178121	2006 TX_{24}	—	October 12, 2006	Kitt Peak	Spacewatch	·	3.7 km	MPC · JPL
178122	2006 TS_{25}	—	October 12, 2006	Kitt Peak	Spacewatch	·	2.0 km	MPC · JPL
178123	2006 TT_{30}	—	October 12, 2006	Kitt Peak	Spacewatch	KOR	1.5 km	MPC · JPL
178124	2006 TW_{31}	—	October 12, 2006	Kitt Peak	Spacewatch	·	2.7 km	MPC · JPL
178125	2006 TR_{33}	—	October 12, 2006	Kitt Peak	Spacewatch	·	2.2 km	MPC · JPL
178126	2006 TZ_{38}	—	October 12, 2006	Kitt Peak	Spacewatch	·	1.9 km	MPC · JPL
178127	2006 TU_{42}	—	October 12, 2006	Kitt Peak	Spacewatch	HOF	3.6 km	MPC · JPL
178128	2006 TL_{43}	—	October 12, 2006	Kitt Peak	Spacewatch	THM	2.8 km	MPC · JPL
178129	2006 TB_{47}	—	October 12, 2006	Kitt Peak	Spacewatch	·	4.8 km	MPC · JPL
178130	2006 TR_{47}	—	October 12, 2006	Kitt Peak	Spacewatch	·	4.8 km	MPC · JPL
178131	2006 TT_{47}	—	October 12, 2006	Kitt Peak	Spacewatch	·	1.7 km	MPC · JPL
178132	2006 TL_{49}	—	October 12, 2006	Palomar	NEAT	·	4.0 km	MPC · JPL
178133	2006 TU_{49}	—	October 12, 2006	Palomar	NEAT	AGN ·	3.3 km	MPC · JPL
178134	2006 TM_{50}	—	October 12, 2006	Kitt Peak	Spacewatch	·	3.6 km	MPC · JPL
178135	2006 TE_{53}	—	October 12, 2006	Kitt Peak	Spacewatch	·	3.4 km	MPC · JPL
178136	2006 TJ_{55}	—	October 12, 2006	Palomar	NEAT	·	2.9 km	MPC · JPL
178137	2006 TV_{55}	—	October 12, 2006	Palomar	NEAT	·	2.8 km	MPC · JPL
178138	2006 TE_{62}	—	October 9, 2006	Palomar	NEAT	EUN	1.8 km	MPC · JPL
178139	2006 TX_{63}	—	October 10, 2006	Palomar	NEAT	V	960 m	MPC · JPL
178140	2006 TY_{70}	—	October 11, 2006	Palomar	NEAT	·	5.9 km	MPC · JPL
178141	2006 TP_{71}	—	October 11, 2006	Palomar	NEAT	·	1.6 km	MPC · JPL
178142	2006 TH_{73}	—	October 11, 2006	Palomar	NEAT	·	3.3 km	MPC · JPL
178143	2006 TP_{73}	—	October 11, 2006	Palomar	NEAT	·	4.6 km	MPC · JPL
178144	2006 TZ_{75}	—	October 11, 2006	Palomar	NEAT	HOF	3.8 km	MPC · JPL
178145	2006 TG_{80}	—	October 13, 2006	Kitt Peak	Spacewatch	·	1.1 km	MPC · JPL
178146	2006 TB_{83}	—	October 13, 2006	Kitt Peak	Spacewatch	·	2.2 km	MPC · JPL
178147	2006 TC_{87}	—	October 13, 2006	Kitt Peak	Spacewatch	·	5.4 km	MPC · JPL
178148	2006 TZ_{87}	—	October 13, 2006	Kitt Peak	Spacewatch	·	2.0 km	MPC · JPL
178149	2006 TO_{91}	—	October 13, 2006	Kitt Peak	Spacewatch	·	3.0 km	MPC · JPL
178150 Taiyuinkwei	2006 TN_{92}	Taiyuinkwei	October 14, 2006	Lulin Observatory	Lin, C.-S., Q. Ye	·	2.0 km	MPC · JPL
178151 Kulangsu	2006 TO_{92}	Kulangsu	October 14, 2006	Lulin Observatory	Q. Ye, Lin, C.-S.	·	4.5 km	MPC · JPL
178152	2006 TA_{96}	—	October 12, 2006	Palomar	NEAT	EMA	3.8 km	MPC · JPL
178153	2006 TR_{97}	—	October 13, 2006	Kitt Peak	Spacewatch	·	1.8 km	MPC · JPL
178154	2006 TP_{109}	—	October 4, 2006	Mount Lemmon	Mount Lemmon Survey	·	5.6 km	MPC · JPL
178155 Kenzaarraki	2006 TN_{117}	Kenzaarraki	October 3, 2006	Apache Point	A. C. Becker	·	3.9 km	MPC · JPL
178156 Borbála	2006 UL_{1}	Borbála	October 17, 2006	Piszkéstető	K. Sárneczky, Kuli, Z.	MAR	1.5 km	MPC · JPL
178157	2006 UX_{5}	—	October 16, 2006	Kitt Peak	Spacewatch	PAD	3.2 km	MPC · JPL
178158	2006 UN_{6}	—	October 16, 2006	Catalina	CSS	EOS	2.8 km	MPC · JPL
178159	2006 UK_{8}	—	October 16, 2006	Catalina	CSS	MIS	3.3 km	MPC · JPL
178160	2006 UH_{11}	—	October 17, 2006	Mount Lemmon	Mount Lemmon Survey	·	1.4 km	MPC · JPL
178161	2006 UF_{13}	—	October 17, 2006	Mount Lemmon	Mount Lemmon Survey	·	2.9 km	MPC · JPL
178162	2006 UG_{18}	—	October 16, 2006	Catalina	CSS	·	1.2 km	MPC · JPL
178163	2006 UL_{32}	—	October 16, 2006	Kitt Peak	Spacewatch	NEM	3.4 km	MPC · JPL
178164	2006 UN_{32}	—	October 16, 2006	Kitt Peak	Spacewatch	·	2.3 km	MPC · JPL
178165	2006 UB_{41}	—	October 16, 2006	Kitt Peak	Spacewatch	THM	4.6 km	MPC · JPL
178166	2006 UD_{43}	—	October 16, 2006	Kitt Peak	Spacewatch	(12739)	2.6 km	MPC · JPL
178167	2006 UH_{46}	—	October 16, 2006	Kitt Peak	Spacewatch	KOR	1.5 km	MPC · JPL
178168	2006 UZ_{46}	—	October 16, 2006	Kitt Peak	Spacewatch	THM	3.2 km	MPC · JPL
178169	2006 UM_{52}	—	October 17, 2006	Mount Lemmon	Mount Lemmon Survey	·	4.0 km	MPC · JPL
178170	2006 US_{53}	—	October 17, 2006	Mount Lemmon	Mount Lemmon Survey	·	2.2 km	MPC · JPL
178171	2006 UH_{64}	—	October 23, 2006	Kitami	K. Endate	TEL	2.1 km	MPC · JPL
178172	2006 UM_{64}	—	October 22, 2006	Altschwendt	W. Ries	·	4.8 km	MPC · JPL
178173	2006 UG_{68}	—	October 16, 2006	Catalina	CSS	KOR · fast	1.9 km	MPC · JPL
178174	2006 UV_{78}	—	October 17, 2006	Kitt Peak	Spacewatch	·	1.8 km	MPC · JPL
178175	2006 UV_{83}	—	October 17, 2006	Kitt Peak	Spacewatch	·	1.9 km	MPC · JPL
178176	2006 UQ_{84}	—	October 17, 2006	Mount Lemmon	Mount Lemmon Survey	·	2.0 km	MPC · JPL
178177	2006 UR_{85}	—	October 17, 2006	Kitt Peak	Spacewatch	NEM	2.9 km	MPC · JPL
178178	2006 UB_{96}	—	October 18, 2006	Kitt Peak	Spacewatch	KOR	1.9 km	MPC · JPL
178179	2006 UJ_{98}	—	October 18, 2006	Kitt Peak	Spacewatch	·	2.5 km	MPC · JPL
178180	2006 UH_{123}	—	October 19, 2006	Kitt Peak	Spacewatch	·	1.8 km	MPC · JPL
178181	2006 UN_{141}	—	October 19, 2006	Mount Lemmon	Mount Lemmon Survey	·	3.3 km	MPC · JPL
178182	2006 UH_{148}	—	October 20, 2006	Mount Lemmon	Mount Lemmon Survey	·	1.7 km	MPC · JPL
178183	2006 UG_{159}	—	October 21, 2006	Mount Lemmon	Mount Lemmon Survey	KOR	1.8 km	MPC · JPL
178184	2006 UM_{160}	—	October 21, 2006	Mount Lemmon	Mount Lemmon Survey	·	1.5 km	MPC · JPL
178185	2006 UM_{161}	—	October 21, 2006	Mount Lemmon	Mount Lemmon Survey	·	3.1 km	MPC · JPL
178186	2006 UV_{167}	—	October 21, 2006	Mount Lemmon	Mount Lemmon Survey	AGN	1.5 km	MPC · JPL
178187	2006 UD_{177}	—	October 16, 2006	Catalina	CSS	·	3.0 km	MPC · JPL
178188	2006 UN_{193}	—	October 20, 2006	Socorro	LINEAR	·	3.7 km	MPC · JPL
178189	2006 UB_{197}	—	October 20, 2006	Kitt Peak	Spacewatch	KOR	1.9 km	MPC · JPL
178190	2006 UQ_{198}	—	October 20, 2006	Kitt Peak	Spacewatch	NYS	1.4 km	MPC · JPL
178191	2006 UX_{203}	—	October 22, 2006	Palomar	NEAT	·	4.8 km	MPC · JPL
178192	2006 UN_{212}	—	October 23, 2006	Kitt Peak	Spacewatch	·	1.9 km	MPC · JPL
178193	2006 UZ_{225}	—	October 20, 2006	Palomar	NEAT	·	2.1 km	MPC · JPL
178194	2006 UE_{227}	—	October 20, 2006	Palomar	NEAT	·	2.1 km	MPC · JPL
178195	2006 UP_{227}	—	October 20, 2006	Palomar	NEAT	·	2.1 km	MPC · JPL
178196	2006 UW_{227}	—	October 20, 2006	Palomar	NEAT	·	3.7 km	MPC · JPL
178197	2006 UP_{231}	—	October 21, 2006	Palomar	NEAT	HYG	4.1 km	MPC · JPL
178198	2006 UP_{272}	—	October 27, 2006	Mount Lemmon	Mount Lemmon Survey	·	5.5 km	MPC · JPL
178199	2006 UW_{284}	—	October 28, 2006	Kitt Peak	Spacewatch	·	1.9 km	MPC · JPL
178200	2006 UL_{288}	—	October 29, 2006	Catalina	CSS	·	5.5 km	MPC · JPL

== 178201–178300 ==
back to top

Designation			Discovery			Properties		Ref
Permanent	Provisional	Named after	Date	Site	Discoverer(s)	Category	Diam.	Ref
178201	2006 UD_{329}	—	October 21, 2006	Kitt Peak	Spacewatch	MAS	1.3 km	MPC · JPL
178202	2006 VZ_{6}	—	November 10, 2006	Kitt Peak	Spacewatch	·	2.3 km	MPC · JPL
178203	2006 VB_{12}	—	November 11, 2006	Mount Lemmon	Mount Lemmon Survey	·	2.3 km	MPC · JPL
178204	2006 VK_{13}	—	November 10, 2006	Kitt Peak	Spacewatch	THM	2.7 km	MPC · JPL
178205	2006 VZ_{15}	—	November 9, 2006	Kitt Peak	Spacewatch	·	4.2 km	MPC · JPL
178206	2006 VM_{26}	—	November 10, 2006	Kitt Peak	Spacewatch	KOR	1.9 km	MPC · JPL
178207	2006 VC_{33}	—	November 11, 2006	Catalina	CSS	·	3.8 km	MPC · JPL
178208	2006 VN_{41}	—	November 12, 2006	Mount Lemmon	Mount Lemmon Survey	THM	4.3 km	MPC · JPL
178209	2006 VZ_{49}	—	November 10, 2006	Kitt Peak	Spacewatch	EOS	4.3 km	MPC · JPL
178210	2006 VR_{55}	—	November 11, 2006	Kitt Peak	Spacewatch	·	1.9 km	MPC · JPL
178211	2006 VQ_{56}	—	November 11, 2006	Kitt Peak	Spacewatch	KOR	2.4 km	MPC · JPL
178212	2006 VB_{59}	—	November 11, 2006	Kitt Peak	Spacewatch	·	2.2 km	MPC · JPL
178213	2006 VT_{61}	—	November 11, 2006	Kitt Peak	Spacewatch	·	3.8 km	MPC · JPL
178214	2006 VR_{64}	—	November 11, 2006	Kitt Peak	Spacewatch	·	3.4 km	MPC · JPL
178215	2006 VM_{79}	—	November 12, 2006	Mount Lemmon	Mount Lemmon Survey	·	1.4 km	MPC · JPL
178216	2006 VN_{86}	—	November 14, 2006	Socorro	LINEAR	·	5.7 km	MPC · JPL
178217	2006 VM_{94}	—	November 15, 2006	Catalina	CSS	·	1.9 km	MPC · JPL
178218	2006 VR_{100}	—	November 11, 2006	Catalina	CSS	·	2.9 km	MPC · JPL
178219	2006 VU_{111}	—	November 13, 2006	Kitt Peak	Spacewatch	·	3.4 km	MPC · JPL
178220	2006 VH_{120}	—	November 14, 2006	Mount Lemmon	Mount Lemmon Survey	·	4.1 km	MPC · JPL
178221	2006 VO_{138}	—	November 15, 2006	Kitt Peak	Spacewatch	KOR	1.6 km	MPC · JPL
178222	2006 VV_{143}	—	November 15, 2006	Catalina	CSS	·	4.3 km	MPC · JPL
178223	2006 VT_{144}	—	November 15, 2006	Catalina	CSS	EOS	2.9 km	MPC · JPL
178224	2006 VL_{153}	—	November 8, 2006	Palomar	NEAT	·	3.1 km	MPC · JPL
178225	2006 VP_{153}	—	November 8, 2006	Palomar	NEAT	·	3.5 km	MPC · JPL
178226 Rebeccalouise	2006 VP_{156}	Rebeccalouise	November 9, 2006	Apache Point	SDSS	NYS	1.8 km	MPC · JPL
178227	2006 WF_{1}	—	November 16, 2006	Calvin-Rehoboth	Calvin College	·	5.9 km	MPC · JPL
178228	2006 WK_{2}	—	November 16, 2006	Kitt Peak	Spacewatch	·	1.1 km	MPC · JPL
178229	2006 WF_{8}	—	November 16, 2006	Mount Lemmon	Mount Lemmon Survey	KOR	1.9 km	MPC · JPL
178230	2006 WK_{8}	—	November 16, 2006	Socorro	LINEAR	·	3.1 km	MPC · JPL
178231	2006 WT_{43}	—	November 16, 2006	Mount Lemmon	Mount Lemmon Survey	·	2.4 km	MPC · JPL
178232	2006 WE_{53}	—	November 16, 2006	Catalina	CSS	·	5.3 km	MPC · JPL
178233	2006 WS_{60}	—	November 17, 2006	Catalina	CSS	·	6.1 km	MPC · JPL
178234	2006 WY_{78}	—	November 18, 2006	Kitt Peak	Spacewatch	·	4.3 km	MPC · JPL
178235	2006 WA_{97}	—	November 19, 2006	Kitt Peak	Spacewatch	·	1.7 km	MPC · JPL
178236	2006 WZ_{104}	—	November 19, 2006	Kitt Peak	Spacewatch	MAS	970 m	MPC · JPL
178237	2006 WV_{131}	—	November 17, 2006	Mount Lemmon	Mount Lemmon Survey	·	4.7 km	MPC · JPL
178238	2006 WJ_{157}	—	November 22, 2006	Catalina	CSS	·	1.2 km	MPC · JPL
178239	2006 WR_{169}	—	November 23, 2006	Kitt Peak	Spacewatch	AST	3.0 km	MPC · JPL
178240	2006 XP_{5}	—	December 6, 2006	Palomar	NEAT	JUN	2.3 km	MPC · JPL
178241	2006 XC_{32}	—	December 9, 2006	Kitt Peak	Spacewatch	THM	3.6 km	MPC · JPL
178242	2006 YX	—	December 16, 2006	Kitt Peak	Spacewatch	·	2.8 km	MPC · JPL
178243 Schaerding	2006 YH_{13}	Schaerding	December 22, 2006	Gaisberg	Gierlinger, R.	·	2.2 km	MPC · JPL
178244	2006 YY_{45}	—	December 21, 2006	Catalina	CSS	·	4.4 km	MPC · JPL
178245	2007 BT	—	January 16, 2007	Anderson Mesa	LONEOS	·	4.6 km	MPC · JPL
178246	2007 BZ_{38}	—	January 24, 2007	Catalina	CSS	·	4.8 km	MPC · JPL
178247	2007 DB_{8}	—	February 21, 2007	RAS	Lowe, A.	·	3.1 km	MPC · JPL
178248	2007 RY_{50}	—	September 9, 2007	Kitt Peak	Spacewatch	·	6.0 km	MPC · JPL
178249	2007 RX_{236}	—	September 13, 2007	Catalina	CSS	TIR	4.7 km	MPC · JPL
178250	2007 TG_{23}	—	October 10, 2007	Catalina	CSS	·	3.0 km	MPC · JPL
178251	2007 TB_{170}	—	October 12, 2007	Socorro	LINEAR	·	6.1 km	MPC · JPL
178252	2007 TU_{171}	—	October 13, 2007	Socorro	LINEAR	AGN	2.0 km	MPC · JPL
178253	2007 UA_{100}	—	October 30, 2007	Kitt Peak	Spacewatch	·	1.7 km	MPC · JPL
178254	2007 VH_{83}	—	November 4, 2007	Mount Lemmon	Mount Lemmon Survey	·	3.9 km	MPC · JPL
178255	2007 VN_{93}	—	November 3, 2007	Socorro	LINEAR	·	6.7 km	MPC · JPL
178256 Juanmi	2007 VR_{102}	Juanmi	November 3, 2007	La Cañada	Lacruz, J.	AGN	1.8 km	MPC · JPL
178257	2007 VZ_{116}	—	November 3, 2007	Kitt Peak	Spacewatch	·	1.7 km	MPC · JPL
178258	2007 VK_{193}	—	November 4, 2007	Mount Lemmon	Mount Lemmon Survey	·	1.9 km	MPC · JPL
178259	2007 VV_{202}	—	November 7, 2007	Mount Lemmon	Mount Lemmon Survey	·	3.2 km	MPC · JPL
178260	2007 VO_{290}	—	November 14, 2007	Kitt Peak	Spacewatch	EUN	2.5 km	MPC · JPL
178261	2007 VH_{302}	—	November 14, 2007	RAS	Lowe, A.	·	2.6 km	MPC · JPL
178262	2007 WK_{7}	—	November 18, 2007	Socorro	LINEAR	·	2.5 km	MPC · JPL
178263 Wienphilo	2007 WV_{55}	Wienphilo	November 29, 2007	Lulin Observatory	Q. Ye	T_{j} (2.99)	6.0 km	MPC · JPL
178264	2007 YU_{2}	—	December 16, 2007	Bergisch Gladbach	W. Bickel	·	3.3 km	MPC · JPL
178265	2007 YJ_{55}	—	December 31, 2007	Mount Lemmon	Mount Lemmon Survey	NYS	1.7 km	MPC · JPL
178266	2007 YJ_{56}	—	December 30, 2007	Mount Lemmon	Mount Lemmon Survey	·	820 m	MPC · JPL
178267 Sarajevo	2007 YG_{59}	Sarajevo	December 31, 2007	OAM	OAM	·	6.1 km	MPC · JPL
178268	2008 AH_{32}	—	January 13, 2008	Kitt Peak	Spacewatch	L5	16 km	MPC · JPL
178269	4178 P-L	—	September 24, 1960	Palomar	C. J. van Houten, I. van Houten-Groeneveld, T. Gehrels	·	3.6 km	MPC · JPL
178270	6822 P-L	—	September 24, 1960	Palomar	C. J. van Houten, I. van Houten-Groeneveld, T. Gehrels	(5)	1.7 km	MPC · JPL
178271	9084 P-L	—	October 17, 1960	Palomar	C. J. van Houten, I. van Houten-Groeneveld, T. Gehrels	(5)	2.4 km	MPC · JPL
178272	1312 T-2	—	September 29, 1973	Palomar	C. J. van Houten, I. van Houten-Groeneveld, T. Gehrels	·	4.5 km	MPC · JPL
178273	1400 T-2	—	September 29, 1973	Palomar	C. J. van Houten, I. van Houten-Groeneveld, T. Gehrels	·	2.5 km	MPC · JPL
178274	2031 T-2	—	September 29, 1973	Palomar	C. J. van Houten, I. van Houten-Groeneveld, T. Gehrels	·	1.7 km	MPC · JPL
178275	4080 T-2	—	September 29, 1973	Palomar	C. J. van Houten, I. van Houten-Groeneveld, T. Gehrels	·	1.9 km	MPC · JPL
178276	5120 T-2	—	September 25, 1973	Palomar	C. J. van Houten, I. van Houten-Groeneveld, T. Gehrels	·	2.8 km	MPC · JPL
178277	5213 T-2	—	September 25, 1973	Palomar	C. J. van Houten, I. van Houten-Groeneveld, T. Gehrels	·	1.2 km	MPC · JPL
178278	2136 T-3	—	October 16, 1977	Palomar	C. J. van Houten, I. van Houten-Groeneveld, T. Gehrels	·	1.1 km	MPC · JPL
178279	2194 T-3	—	October 16, 1977	Palomar	C. J. van Houten, I. van Houten-Groeneveld, T. Gehrels	·	3.6 km	MPC · JPL
178280	2357 T-3	—	October 16, 1977	Palomar	C. J. van Houten, I. van Houten-Groeneveld, T. Gehrels	ERI	2.4 km	MPC · JPL
178281	2635 T-3	—	October 16, 1977	Palomar	C. J. van Houten, I. van Houten-Groeneveld, T. Gehrels	(5)	1.6 km	MPC · JPL
178282	3089 T-3	—	October 16, 1977	Palomar	C. J. van Houten, I. van Houten-Groeneveld, T. Gehrels	·	1.7 km	MPC · JPL
178283	4261 T-3	—	October 16, 1977	Palomar	C. J. van Houten, I. van Houten-Groeneveld, T. Gehrels	·	1.9 km	MPC · JPL
178284	1978 WB_{1}	—	November 29, 1978	Palomar	S. J. Bus, C. T. Kowal	·	6.2 km	MPC · JPL
178285	1981 EA_{33}	—	March 1, 1981	Siding Spring	S. J. Bus	·	3.0 km	MPC · JPL
178286	1981 EQ_{35}	—	March 2, 1981	Siding Spring	S. J. Bus	·	2.2 km	MPC · JPL
178287	1981 UW_{27}	—	October 24, 1981	Palomar	S. J. Bus	·	1.9 km	MPC · JPL
178288	1983 QF_{1}	—	August 30, 1983	Palomar	Gibson, J.	·	2.0 km	MPC · JPL
178289	1989 TH_{3}	—	October 7, 1989	La Silla	E. W. Elst	NYS	1.6 km	MPC · JPL
178290	1989 TD_{4}	—	October 7, 1989	La Silla	E. W. Elst	·	1.7 km	MPC · JPL
178291	1989 UV_{7}	—	October 29, 1989	Cerro Tololo	S. J. Bus	L5	15 km	MPC · JPL
178292	1990 QZ_{19}	—	August 17, 1990	Palomar	Lowe, A.	·	4.6 km	MPC · JPL
178293	1990 SN	—	September 17, 1990	Kitt Peak	Spacewatch	·	990 m	MPC · JPL
178294 Wertheimer	1990 TA_{12}	Wertheimer	October 11, 1990	Tautenburg Observatory	F. Börngen, L. D. Schmadel	·	2.0 km	MPC · JPL
178295	1992 DJ_{6}	—	February 29, 1992	La Silla	UESAC	3:2 · SHU	11 km	MPC · JPL
178296	1992 SM_{6}	—	September 26, 1992	Kitt Peak	Spacewatch	·	4.4 km	MPC · JPL
178297	1993 FK_{31}	—	March 19, 1993	La Silla	UESAC	·	1.8 km	MPC · JPL
178298	1993 FT_{51}	—	March 17, 1993	La Silla	UESAC	NYS	2.1 km	MPC · JPL
178299	1993 FU_{53}	—	March 17, 1993	La Silla	UESAC	HIL · 3:2	7.6 km	MPC · JPL
178300	1993 ON	—	July 24, 1993	Stroncone	A. Vagnozzi	·	1.7 km	MPC · JPL

== 178301–178400 ==
back to top

Designation			Discovery			Properties		Ref
Permanent	Provisional	Named after	Date	Site	Discoverer(s)	Category	Diam.	Ref
178301	1993 QW_{3}	—	August 18, 1993	Caussols	E. W. Elst	·	2.6 km	MPC · JPL
178302	1993 TR_{10}	—	October 15, 1993	Kitt Peak	Spacewatch	·	1.9 km	MPC · JPL
178303	1993 TB_{27}	—	October 9, 1993	La Silla	E. W. Elst	·	2.2 km	MPC · JPL
178304	1994 GW_{2}	—	April 6, 1994	Kitt Peak	Spacewatch	H	870 m	MPC · JPL
178305	1994 GL_{8}	—	April 15, 1994	Kitt Peak	Spacewatch	·	1.6 km	MPC · JPL
178306	1994 PT_{25}	—	August 12, 1994	La Silla	E. W. Elst	NYS	1.7 km	MPC · JPL
178307	1994 PS_{29}	—	August 12, 1994	La Silla	E. W. Elst	·	1.8 km	MPC · JPL
178308	1994 PP_{32}	—	August 12, 1994	La Silla	E. W. Elst	·	3.8 km	MPC · JPL
178309	1994 RP_{5}	—	September 12, 1994	Kitt Peak	Spacewatch	NYS	1.7 km	MPC · JPL
178310	1994 RF_{10}	—	September 12, 1994	Kitt Peak	Spacewatch	·	4.2 km	MPC · JPL
178311	1994 SC_{3}	—	September 28, 1994	Kitt Peak	Spacewatch	·	4.3 km	MPC · JPL
178312	1994 SR_{7}	—	September 28, 1994	Kitt Peak	Spacewatch	·	3.6 km	MPC · JPL
178313	1994 TK_{6}	—	October 4, 1994	Kitt Peak	Spacewatch	·	2.3 km	MPC · JPL
178314	1994 TD_{9}	—	October 8, 1994	Kitt Peak	Spacewatch	NYS	1.8 km	MPC · JPL
178315	1994 TC_{16}	—	October 6, 1994	Kitt Peak	Spacewatch	·	3.9 km	MPC · JPL
178316	1995 CL_{2}	—	February 1, 1995	Kitt Peak	Spacewatch	·	810 m	MPC · JPL
178317	1995 DB_{7}	—	February 24, 1995	Kitt Peak	Spacewatch	EUN	1.8 km	MPC · JPL
178318	1995 FB_{2}	—	March 23, 1995	Kitt Peak	Spacewatch	·	1.9 km	MPC · JPL
178319	1995 FL_{6}	—	March 23, 1995	Kitt Peak	Spacewatch	·	1.9 km	MPC · JPL
178320	1995 FK_{10}	—	March 26, 1995	Kitt Peak	Spacewatch	·	2.3 km	MPC · JPL
178321	1995 HY_{1}	—	April 24, 1995	Kitt Peak	Spacewatch	·	3.5 km	MPC · JPL
178322	1995 KB_{4}	—	May 26, 1995	Kitt Peak	Spacewatch	·	2.9 km	MPC · JPL
178323	1995 OC_{6}	—	July 22, 1995	Kitt Peak	Spacewatch	KOR	1.9 km	MPC · JPL
178324	1995 OB_{14}	—	July 23, 1995	Kitt Peak	Spacewatch	·	1.1 km	MPC · JPL
178325	1995 SB_{9}	—	September 17, 1995	Kitt Peak	Spacewatch	MAS	910 m	MPC · JPL
178326	1995 SA_{17}	—	September 18, 1995	Kitt Peak	Spacewatch	·	3.0 km	MPC · JPL
178327	1995 SL_{18}	—	September 18, 1995	Kitt Peak	Spacewatch	NYS	1.3 km	MPC · JPL
178328	1995 SS_{32}	—	September 21, 1995	Kitt Peak	Spacewatch	·	1.1 km	MPC · JPL
178329	1995 SO_{36}	—	September 24, 1995	Kitt Peak	Spacewatch	·	3.6 km	MPC · JPL
178330	1995 SR_{37}	—	September 24, 1995	Kitt Peak	Spacewatch	·	1.4 km	MPC · JPL
178331	1995 SL_{40}	—	September 25, 1995	Kitt Peak	Spacewatch	·	1.3 km	MPC · JPL
178332	1995 SN_{41}	—	September 25, 1995	Kitt Peak	Spacewatch	EOS	2.5 km	MPC · JPL
178333	1995 SY_{41}	—	September 25, 1995	Kitt Peak	Spacewatch	·	1.5 km	MPC · JPL
178334	1995 SF_{43}	—	September 25, 1995	Kitt Peak	Spacewatch	MAS	1.0 km	MPC · JPL
178335	1995 SA_{73}	—	September 27, 1995	Kitt Peak	Spacewatch	·	2.4 km	MPC · JPL
178336	1995 TE_{4}	—	October 15, 1995	Kitt Peak	Spacewatch	·	3.2 km	MPC · JPL
178337	1995 UM_{2}	—	October 24, 1995	Kleť	Kleť	·	1.3 km	MPC · JPL
178338	1995 UT_{6}	—	October 19, 1995	Catalina Station	T. B. Spahr	·	4.5 km	MPC · JPL
178339	1995 UM_{23}	—	October 19, 1995	Kitt Peak	Spacewatch	·	2.6 km	MPC · JPL
178340	1995 UL_{26}	—	October 20, 1995	Kitt Peak	Spacewatch	MAS	1.0 km	MPC · JPL
178341	1995 UK_{35}	—	October 21, 1995	Kitt Peak	Spacewatch	NYS	1.4 km	MPC · JPL
178342	1995 UD_{38}	—	October 22, 1995	Kitt Peak	Spacewatch	·	1.5 km	MPC · JPL
178343	1995 VC_{8}	—	November 14, 1995	Kitt Peak	Spacewatch	MAS	870 m	MPC · JPL
178344	1995 VZ_{9}	—	November 15, 1995	Kitt Peak	Spacewatch	·	2.6 km	MPC · JPL
178345	1995 VZ_{16}	—	November 15, 1995	Kitt Peak	Spacewatch	·	1.5 km	MPC · JPL
178346	1995 WQ_{1}	—	November 19, 1995	Farra d'Isonzo	Farra d'Isonzo	·	2.5 km	MPC · JPL
178347	1995 WH_{12}	—	November 16, 1995	Kitt Peak	Spacewatch	·	1.4 km	MPC · JPL
178348	1995 WQ_{19}	—	November 17, 1995	Kitt Peak	Spacewatch	ERI	2.8 km	MPC · JPL
178349	1995 WT_{30}	—	November 19, 1995	Kitt Peak	Spacewatch	NYS	1.2 km	MPC · JPL
178350	1995 YZ_{19}	—	December 22, 1995	Kitt Peak	Spacewatch	·	5.5 km	MPC · JPL
178351	1996 AO_{6}	—	January 12, 1996	Kitt Peak	Spacewatch	HYG	3.9 km	MPC · JPL
178352	1996 EB_{5}	—	March 11, 1996	Kitt Peak	Spacewatch	·	1.8 km	MPC · JPL
178353	1996 GO_{5}	—	April 11, 1996	Kitt Peak	Spacewatch	·	1.5 km	MPC · JPL
178354	1996 RX	—	September 10, 1996	Haleakala	NEAT	H	820 m	MPC · JPL
178355	1996 RZ_{9}	—	September 7, 1996	Kitt Peak	Spacewatch	AST	3.1 km	MPC · JPL
178356	1996 RV_{13}	—	September 8, 1996	Kitt Peak	Spacewatch	·	3.0 km	MPC · JPL
178357	1996 RW_{20}	—	September 5, 1996	Kitt Peak	Spacewatch	·	790 m	MPC · JPL
178358	1996 TL_{31}	—	October 8, 1996	Kitt Peak	Spacewatch	·	2.8 km	MPC · JPL
178359	1996 VW_{9}	—	November 3, 1996	Kitt Peak	Spacewatch	·	1.1 km	MPC · JPL
178360	1996 VF_{27}	—	November 11, 1996	Kitt Peak	Spacewatch	·	2.4 km	MPC · JPL
178361	1996 WL_{3}	—	November 28, 1996	Xinglong	SCAP	·	1.8 km	MPC · JPL
178362	1996 XE_{16}	—	December 4, 1996	Kitt Peak	Spacewatch	V	930 m	MPC · JPL
178363	1997 AG_{6}	—	January 8, 1997	Prescott	P. G. Comba	V	1.2 km	MPC · JPL
178364	1997 AT_{10}	—	January 9, 1997	Kitt Peak	Spacewatch	·	6.8 km	MPC · JPL
178365	1997 BT_{4}	—	January 31, 1997	Kitt Peak	Spacewatch	·	3.0 km	MPC · JPL
178366	1997 CU_{7}	—	February 1, 1997	Kitt Peak	Spacewatch	NYS	1.4 km	MPC · JPL
178367	1997 CG_{12}	—	February 3, 1997	Kitt Peak	Spacewatch	·	1.6 km	MPC · JPL
178368	1997 CP_{16}	—	February 9, 1997	Kitt Peak	Spacewatch	·	1.3 km	MPC · JPL
178369	1997 CZ_{23}	—	February 7, 1997	Kitt Peak	Spacewatch	·	930 m	MPC · JPL
178370	1997 EM_{4}	—	March 2, 1997	Kitt Peak	Spacewatch	·	1.4 km	MPC · JPL
178371	1997 ET_{4}	—	March 2, 1997	Kitt Peak	Spacewatch	HYG	3.7 km	MPC · JPL
178372	1997 ER_{10}	—	March 7, 1997	Kitt Peak	Spacewatch	·	4.6 km	MPC · JPL
178373	1997 EJ_{26}	—	March 4, 1997	Kitt Peak	Spacewatch	V	850 m	MPC · JPL
178374	1997 GZ_{2}	—	April 7, 1997	Kitt Peak	Spacewatch	·	3.5 km	MPC · JPL
178375	1997 GY_{10}	—	April 3, 1997	Socorro	LINEAR	·	2.0 km	MPC · JPL
178376	1997 GR_{18}	—	April 3, 1997	Socorro	LINEAR	EUN	2.3 km	MPC · JPL
178377	1997 GL_{20}	—	April 5, 1997	Socorro	LINEAR	·	2.1 km	MPC · JPL
178378	1997 GB_{25}	—	April 7, 1997	Kitt Peak	Spacewatch	NYS	1.7 km	MPC · JPL
178379	1997 HP_{14}	—	April 28, 1997	Kitt Peak	Spacewatch	·	3.7 km	MPC · JPL
178380	1997 KM_{4}	—	May 28, 1997	Bergisch Gladbach	W. Bickel	·	5.4 km	MPC · JPL
178381	1997 NS_{2}	—	July 2, 1997	Kitt Peak	Spacewatch	·	3.3 km	MPC · JPL
178382	1997 NW_{5}	—	July 7, 1997	Kitt Peak	Spacewatch	·	2.0 km	MPC · JPL
178383 Teruel	1997 PD_{4}	Teruel	August 5, 1997	Mallorca	Á. López J., R. Pacheco	RAF	1.6 km	MPC · JPL
178384	1997 SS_{18}	—	September 28, 1997	Kitt Peak	Spacewatch	·	1.3 km	MPC · JPL
178385	1997 TQ_{13}	—	October 3, 1997	Kitt Peak	Spacewatch	·	1.3 km	MPC · JPL
178386	1997 TE_{16}	—	October 7, 1997	Kitt Peak	Spacewatch	·	1.9 km	MPC · JPL
178387	1997 TN_{30}	—	October 11, 1997	Kitt Peak	Spacewatch	L4	15 km	MPC · JPL
178388	1997 US_{5}	—	October 21, 1997	Kitt Peak	Spacewatch	(5)	2.2 km	MPC · JPL
178389	1997 WH_{9}	—	November 21, 1997	Kitt Peak	Spacewatch	·	1.7 km	MPC · JPL
178390	1998 EC_{10}	—	March 1, 1998	Xinglong	SCAP	·	3.0 km	MPC · JPL
178391	1998 FH_{1}	—	March 20, 1998	Kitt Peak	Spacewatch	·	3.0 km	MPC · JPL
178392	1998 FS_{38}	—	March 20, 1998	Socorro	LINEAR	·	1.3 km	MPC · JPL
178393	1998 FD_{47}	—	March 20, 1998	Socorro	LINEAR	·	6.3 km	MPC · JPL
178394	1998 HT_{41}	—	April 24, 1998	Kitt Peak	Spacewatch	·	770 m	MPC · JPL
178395	1998 HW_{113}	—	April 23, 1998	Socorro	LINEAR	·	1.1 km	MPC · JPL
178396	1998 HB_{146}	—	April 21, 1998	Socorro	LINEAR	·	1.3 km	MPC · JPL
178397	1998 HE_{146}	—	April 21, 1998	Socorro	LINEAR	·	1.4 km	MPC · JPL
178398	1998 KO_{43}	—	May 29, 1998	Kitt Peak	Spacewatch	V	1.1 km	MPC · JPL
178399	1998 MT_{30}	—	June 25, 1998	Kitt Peak	Spacewatch	·	4.5 km	MPC · JPL
178400	1998 OA_{11}	—	July 26, 1998	La Silla	E. W. Elst	·	2.1 km	MPC · JPL

== 178401–178500 ==
back to top

Designation			Discovery			Properties		Ref
Permanent	Provisional	Named after	Date	Site	Discoverer(s)	Category	Diam.	Ref
178401	1998 QY_{2}	—	August 17, 1998	Socorro	LINEAR	PHO	1.4 km	MPC · JPL
178402	1998 QZ_{2}	—	August 17, 1998	Socorro	LINEAR	·	2.1 km	MPC · JPL
178403	1998 QT_{3}	—	August 17, 1998	Socorro	LINEAR	H	970 m	MPC · JPL
178404	1998 QB_{4}	—	August 17, 1998	Reedy Creek	J. Broughton	·	1.5 km	MPC · JPL
178405	1998 QJ_{23}	—	August 17, 1998	Socorro	LINEAR	·	3.2 km	MPC · JPL
178406	1998 QP_{26}	—	August 24, 1998	Reedy Creek	J. Broughton	·	1.9 km	MPC · JPL
178407	1998 QY_{27}	—	August 26, 1998	Kitt Peak	Spacewatch	NYS	2.4 km	MPC · JPL
178408	1998 RR	—	September 9, 1998	Caussols	ODAS	·	2.5 km	MPC · JPL
178409	1998 RJ_{3}	—	September 14, 1998	Socorro	LINEAR	H	800 m	MPC · JPL
178410	1998 RE_{6}	—	September 14, 1998	Anderson Mesa	LONEOS	·	2.3 km	MPC · JPL
178411	1998 RC_{9}	—	September 13, 1998	Kitt Peak	Spacewatch	·	2.0 km	MPC · JPL
178412	1998 RD_{28}	—	September 14, 1998	Socorro	LINEAR	(5)	1.3 km	MPC · JPL
178413	1998 RB_{32}	—	September 14, 1998	Socorro	LINEAR	·	2.0 km	MPC · JPL
178414	1998 RH_{34}	—	September 14, 1998	Socorro	LINEAR	NYS	1.6 km	MPC · JPL
178415	1998 RO_{34}	—	September 14, 1998	Socorro	LINEAR	(6769)	2.4 km	MPC · JPL
178416	1998 RX_{48}	—	September 14, 1998	Socorro	LINEAR	·	2.1 km	MPC · JPL
178417	1998 RN_{74}	—	September 14, 1998	Socorro	LINEAR	·	2.4 km	MPC · JPL
178418	1998 RD_{78}	—	September 14, 1998	Socorro	LINEAR	NYS	1.9 km	MPC · JPL
178419	1998 RR_{78}	—	September 14, 1998	Socorro	LINEAR	V	1.5 km	MPC · JPL
178420	1998 SR_{7}	—	September 20, 1998	Kitt Peak	Spacewatch	·	2.0 km	MPC · JPL
178421	1998 SQ_{10}	—	September 19, 1998	Socorro	LINEAR	H	1.1 km	MPC · JPL
178422	1998 SZ_{13}	—	September 26, 1998	Socorro	LINEAR	H	980 m	MPC · JPL
178423	1998 SN_{31}	—	September 20, 1998	Kitt Peak	Spacewatch	·	2.2 km	MPC · JPL
178424	1998 SS_{85}	—	September 26, 1998	Socorro	LINEAR	·	2.6 km	MPC · JPL
178425	1998 SY_{101}	—	September 26, 1998	Socorro	LINEAR	·	2.0 km	MPC · JPL
178426	1998 SW_{102}	—	September 26, 1998	Socorro	LINEAR	MAS	1.3 km	MPC · JPL
178427	1998 SU_{118}	—	September 26, 1998	Socorro	LINEAR	·	2.4 km	MPC · JPL
178428	1998 SS_{151}	—	September 26, 1998	Socorro	LINEAR	·	2.3 km	MPC · JPL
178429	1998 SL_{164}	—	September 18, 1998	La Silla	E. W. Elst	·	3.1 km	MPC · JPL
178430	1998 SD_{168}	—	September 16, 1998	Anderson Mesa	LONEOS	(5)	1.9 km	MPC · JPL
178431	1998 TE_{3}	—	October 14, 1998	Catalina	CSS	H	1.1 km	MPC · JPL
178432	1998 TR_{35}	—	October 14, 1998	Caussols	ODAS	·	1.3 km	MPC · JPL
178433	1998 UR_{2}	—	October 20, 1998	Caussols	ODAS	·	1.7 km	MPC · JPL
178434	1998 UU_{4}	—	October 20, 1998	Caussols	ODAS	·	2.0 km	MPC · JPL
178435	1998 UD_{30}	—	October 18, 1998	La Silla	E. W. Elst	·	2.8 km	MPC · JPL
178436	1998 UH_{38}	—	October 28, 1998	Socorro	LINEAR	·	2.7 km	MPC · JPL
178437	1998 VM_{3}	—	November 10, 1998	Caussols	ODAS	MAS	1.2 km	MPC · JPL
178438	1998 WU_{28}	—	November 23, 1998	Kitt Peak	Spacewatch	·	1.4 km	MPC · JPL
178439	1998 WF_{41}	—	November 18, 1998	Socorro	LINEAR	·	1.4 km	MPC · JPL
178440	1998 XP_{24}	—	December 11, 1998	Kitt Peak	Spacewatch	·	2.6 km	MPC · JPL
178441	1999 AO_{25}	—	January 14, 1999	Catalina	CSS	BAR	1.8 km	MPC · JPL
178442	1999 CF_{24}	—	February 10, 1999	Socorro	LINEAR	·	2.0 km	MPC · JPL
178443	1999 CU_{79}	—	February 12, 1999	Socorro	LINEAR	·	3.0 km	MPC · JPL
178444	1999 CZ_{96}	—	February 10, 1999	Socorro	LINEAR	·	3.9 km	MPC · JPL
178445	1999 CT_{118}	—	February 10, 1999	Xinglong	SCAP	·	4.4 km	MPC · JPL
178446	1999 CR_{136}	—	February 9, 1999	Kitt Peak	Spacewatch	·	1.7 km	MPC · JPL
178447	1999 CL_{142}	—	February 10, 1999	Kitt Peak	Spacewatch	·	1.9 km	MPC · JPL
178448	1999 FG_{14}	—	March 19, 1999	Kitt Peak	Spacewatch	·	3.3 km	MPC · JPL
178449	1999 FO_{15}	—	March 20, 1999	Kitt Peak	Spacewatch	·	2.5 km	MPC · JPL
178450	1999 GY_{1}	—	April 6, 1999	Kitt Peak	Spacewatch	AGN	1.5 km	MPC · JPL
178451	1999 GU_{6}	—	April 14, 1999	Kitt Peak	Spacewatch	·	1.1 km	MPC · JPL
178452	1999 HC_{6}	—	April 18, 1999	Kitt Peak	Spacewatch	NEM	3.8 km	MPC · JPL
178453	1999 JN_{7}	—	May 8, 1999	Catalina	CSS	·	3.0 km	MPC · JPL
178454	1999 JF_{101}	—	May 12, 1999	Socorro	LINEAR	·	3.5 km	MPC · JPL
178455	1999 NS_{5}	—	July 13, 1999	Socorro	LINEAR	·	1.2 km	MPC · JPL
178456	1999 NE_{35}	—	July 14, 1999	Socorro	LINEAR	·	1.1 km	MPC · JPL
178457	1999 RS_{29}	—	September 8, 1999	Socorro	LINEAR	PHO	1.9 km	MPC · JPL
178458	1999 RQ_{56}	—	September 7, 1999	Socorro	LINEAR	·	3.0 km	MPC · JPL
178459	1999 RQ_{63}	—	September 7, 1999	Socorro	LINEAR	·	3.0 km	MPC · JPL
178460	1999 RD_{64}	—	September 7, 1999	Socorro	LINEAR	·	6.7 km	MPC · JPL
178461	1999 RY_{75}	—	September 7, 1999	Socorro	LINEAR	·	1.1 km	MPC · JPL
178462	1999 RA_{76}	—	September 7, 1999	Socorro	LINEAR	·	1.1 km	MPC · JPL
178463	1999 RH_{78}	—	September 7, 1999	Socorro	LINEAR	·	1.4 km	MPC · JPL
178464	1999 RS_{78}	—	September 7, 1999	Socorro	LINEAR	·	1.4 km	MPC · JPL
178465	1999 RX_{84}	—	September 7, 1999	Socorro	LINEAR	·	5.0 km	MPC · JPL
178466	1999 RE_{105}	—	September 8, 1999	Socorro	LINEAR	·	1.5 km	MPC · JPL
178467	1999 RZ_{114}	—	September 9, 1999	Socorro	LINEAR	·	1.3 km	MPC · JPL
178468	1999 RW_{129}	—	September 9, 1999	Socorro	LINEAR	·	1.4 km	MPC · JPL
178469	1999 RN_{145}	—	September 9, 1999	Socorro	LINEAR	V	1.0 km	MPC · JPL
178470	1999 RV_{156}	—	September 9, 1999	Socorro	LINEAR	(2076)	1.2 km	MPC · JPL
178471	1999 RN_{163}	—	September 9, 1999	Socorro	LINEAR	(2076)	1.2 km	MPC · JPL
178472	1999 RA_{166}	—	September 9, 1999	Socorro	LINEAR	HYG	4.4 km	MPC · JPL
178473	1999 RU_{170}	—	September 9, 1999	Socorro	LINEAR	·	1.4 km	MPC · JPL
178474	1999 RY_{171}	—	September 9, 1999	Socorro	LINEAR	V	890 m	MPC · JPL
178475	1999 RC_{172}	—	September 9, 1999	Socorro	LINEAR	·	2.9 km	MPC · JPL
178476	1999 RK_{177}	—	September 9, 1999	Socorro	LINEAR	·	4.3 km	MPC · JPL
178477	1999 RJ_{191}	—	September 11, 1999	Socorro	LINEAR	·	4.3 km	MPC · JPL
178478	1999 RE_{238}	—	September 8, 1999	Catalina	CSS	·	1.5 km	MPC · JPL
178479	1999 RN_{252}	—	September 8, 1999	Kitt Peak	Spacewatch	·	4.5 km	MPC · JPL
178480	1999 TJ_{29}	—	October 4, 1999	Socorro	LINEAR	V	980 m	MPC · JPL
178481	1999 TB_{34}	—	October 4, 1999	Socorro	LINEAR	·	2.0 km	MPC · JPL
178482	1999 TM_{45}	—	October 3, 1999	Kitt Peak	Spacewatch	·	1.1 km	MPC · JPL
178483	1999 TG_{50}	—	October 4, 1999	Kitt Peak	Spacewatch	·	1.2 km	MPC · JPL
178484	1999 TT_{61}	—	October 7, 1999	Kitt Peak	Spacewatch	·	1.5 km	MPC · JPL
178485	1999 TV_{61}	—	October 15, 1999	Socorro	LINEAR	·	3.0 km	MPC · JPL
178486	1999 TB_{64}	—	October 8, 1999	Kitt Peak	Spacewatch	NYS	860 m	MPC · JPL
178487	1999 TB_{67}	—	October 8, 1999	Kitt Peak	Spacewatch	·	1.4 km	MPC · JPL
178488	1999 TM_{73}	—	October 10, 1999	Kitt Peak	Spacewatch	EOS	2.9 km	MPC · JPL
178489	1999 TQ_{76}	—	October 10, 1999	Kitt Peak	Spacewatch	·	1.6 km	MPC · JPL
178490	1999 TN_{83}	—	October 12, 1999	Kitt Peak	Spacewatch	HYG	3.7 km	MPC · JPL
178491	1999 TO_{92}	—	October 2, 1999	Socorro	LINEAR	·	1.2 km	MPC · JPL
178492	1999 TT_{104}	—	October 3, 1999	Socorro	LINEAR	·	1.2 km	MPC · JPL
178493	1999 TB_{108}	—	October 4, 1999	Socorro	LINEAR	V	910 m	MPC · JPL
178494	1999 TD_{114}	—	October 4, 1999	Socorro	LINEAR	·	1.1 km	MPC · JPL
178495	1999 TM_{114}	—	October 4, 1999	Socorro	LINEAR	NYS	1.2 km	MPC · JPL
178496	1999 TO_{114}	—	October 4, 1999	Socorro	LINEAR	·	1.1 km	MPC · JPL
178497	1999 TH_{117}	—	October 4, 1999	Socorro	LINEAR	·	4.1 km	MPC · JPL
178498	1999 TJ_{124}	—	October 4, 1999	Socorro	LINEAR	NYS	2.6 km	MPC · JPL
178499	1999 TK_{125}	—	October 4, 1999	Socorro	LINEAR	·	1.8 km	MPC · JPL
178500	1999 TB_{130}	—	October 6, 1999	Socorro	LINEAR	·	4.5 km	MPC · JPL

== 178501–178600 ==
back to top

Designation			Discovery			Properties		Ref
Permanent	Provisional	Named after	Date	Site	Discoverer(s)	Category	Diam.	Ref
178501	1999 TQ_{131}	—	October 6, 1999	Socorro	LINEAR	·	1.1 km	MPC · JPL
178502	1999 TE_{141}	—	October 6, 1999	Socorro	LINEAR	·	1.2 km	MPC · JPL
178503	1999 TN_{146}	—	October 7, 1999	Socorro	LINEAR	·	2.5 km	MPC · JPL
178504	1999 TK_{147}	—	October 7, 1999	Socorro	LINEAR	·	1.4 km	MPC · JPL
178505	1999 TO_{148}	—	October 7, 1999	Socorro	LINEAR	·	1.6 km	MPC · JPL
178506	1999 TJ_{151}	—	October 7, 1999	Socorro	LINEAR	·	1.5 km	MPC · JPL
178507	1999 TV_{151}	—	October 7, 1999	Socorro	LINEAR	V	1.3 km	MPC · JPL
178508	1999 TF_{163}	—	October 9, 1999	Socorro	LINEAR	NYS	1.9 km	MPC · JPL
178509	1999 TX_{163}	—	October 9, 1999	Socorro	LINEAR	NYS	1.2 km	MPC · JPL
178510	1999 TB_{169}	—	October 10, 1999	Socorro	LINEAR	·	1.1 km	MPC · JPL
178511	1999 TC_{170}	—	October 10, 1999	Socorro	LINEAR	·	7.0 km	MPC · JPL
178512	1999 TU_{170}	—	October 10, 1999	Socorro	LINEAR	·	1.9 km	MPC · JPL
178513	1999 TG_{172}	—	October 10, 1999	Socorro	LINEAR	·	2.1 km	MPC · JPL
178514	1999 TF_{175}	—	October 10, 1999	Socorro	LINEAR	·	1.9 km	MPC · JPL
178515	1999 TN_{197}	—	October 12, 1999	Socorro	LINEAR	·	1.5 km	MPC · JPL
178516	1999 TT_{200}	—	October 13, 1999	Socorro	LINEAR	·	1.1 km	MPC · JPL
178517	1999 TY_{200}	—	October 13, 1999	Socorro	LINEAR	·	2.9 km	MPC · JPL
178518	1999 TU_{207}	—	October 14, 1999	Socorro	LINEAR	H	900 m	MPC · JPL
178519	1999 TM_{213}	—	October 15, 1999	Socorro	LINEAR	HYG	5.2 km	MPC · JPL
178520	1999 TD_{215}	—	October 15, 1999	Socorro	LINEAR	·	1.1 km	MPC · JPL
178521	1999 TT_{222}	—	October 2, 1999	Socorro	LINEAR	·	1.4 km	MPC · JPL
178522	1999 TD_{225}	—	October 2, 1999	Kitt Peak	Spacewatch	·	1.0 km	MPC · JPL
178523	1999 TD_{229}	—	October 4, 1999	Kitt Peak	Spacewatch	·	1.3 km	MPC · JPL
178524	1999 TC_{230}	—	October 3, 1999	Anderson Mesa	LONEOS	(2076)	1.6 km	MPC · JPL
178525	1999 TA_{248}	—	October 8, 1999	Catalina	CSS	NYS	2.0 km	MPC · JPL
178526	1999 TG_{251}	—	October 6, 1999	Socorro	LINEAR	(5)	1.4 km	MPC · JPL
178527	1999 TN_{260}	—	October 10, 1999	Kitt Peak	Spacewatch	MAS	1.1 km	MPC · JPL
178528	1999 TO_{280}	—	October 8, 1999	Socorro	LINEAR	·	6.9 km	MPC · JPL
178529	1999 TG_{286}	—	October 10, 1999	Socorro	LINEAR	·	1.6 km	MPC · JPL
178530	1999 TE_{288}	—	October 10, 1999	Socorro	LINEAR	·	1.2 km	MPC · JPL
178531	1999 TE_{292}	—	October 11, 1999	Socorro	LINEAR	·	980 m	MPC · JPL
178532	1999 TE_{306}	—	October 6, 1999	Socorro	LINEAR	·	1.2 km	MPC · JPL
178533	1999 TB_{319}	—	October 12, 1999	Kitt Peak	Spacewatch	·	1.1 km	MPC · JPL
178534 Mosheelitzur	1999 TO_{333}	Mosheelitzur	October 13, 1999	Apache Point	SDSS	·	1.6 km	MPC · JPL
178535	1999 UA	—	October 16, 1999	Ondřejov	P. Pravec, P. Kušnirák	·	1.7 km	MPC · JPL
178536	1999 UV_{10}	—	October 31, 1999	Socorro	LINEAR	H	1.0 km	MPC · JPL
178537	1999 UD_{16}	—	October 29, 1999	Catalina	CSS	·	1.4 km	MPC · JPL
178538	1999 UN_{27}	—	October 30, 1999	Kitt Peak	Spacewatch	·	4.0 km	MPC · JPL
178539	1999 UJ_{34}	—	October 31, 1999	Kitt Peak	Spacewatch	·	1.5 km	MPC · JPL
178540	1999 UC_{37}	—	October 16, 1999	Kitt Peak	Spacewatch	·	1.2 km	MPC · JPL
178541	1999 UN_{46}	—	October 31, 1999	Catalina	CSS	LIX	8.2 km	MPC · JPL
178542	1999 UO_{56}	—	October 22, 1999	Socorro	LINEAR	·	2.1 km	MPC · JPL
178543	1999 VP_{1}	—	November 3, 1999	Heppenheim	Starkenburg	V	900 m	MPC · JPL
178544	1999 VT_{17}	—	November 2, 1999	Kitt Peak	Spacewatch	NYS	1.4 km	MPC · JPL
178545	1999 VN_{19}	—	November 10, 1999	Višnjan Observatory	K. Korlević	·	1.7 km	MPC · JPL
178546	1999 VK_{34}	—	November 3, 1999	Socorro	LINEAR	MAR	1.7 km	MPC · JPL
178547	1999 VR_{39}	—	November 11, 1999	Kitt Peak	Spacewatch	V	870 m	MPC · JPL
178548	1999 VN_{55}	—	November 4, 1999	Socorro	LINEAR	·	2.5 km	MPC · JPL
178549	1999 VE_{64}	—	November 4, 1999	Socorro	LINEAR	·	2.3 km	MPC · JPL
178550	1999 VK_{78}	—	November 4, 1999	Socorro	LINEAR	·	1.5 km	MPC · JPL
178551	1999 VO_{79}	—	November 4, 1999	Socorro	LINEAR	H	760 m	MPC · JPL
178552	1999 VD_{82}	—	November 5, 1999	Socorro	LINEAR	·	1.4 km	MPC · JPL
178553	1999 VU_{103}	—	November 9, 1999	Socorro	LINEAR	·	1.4 km	MPC · JPL
178554	1999 VT_{105}	—	November 9, 1999	Socorro	LINEAR	·	1.8 km	MPC · JPL
178555	1999 VM_{125}	—	November 6, 1999	Kitt Peak	Spacewatch	THM	3.9 km	MPC · JPL
178556	1999 VM_{132}	—	November 9, 1999	Kitt Peak	Spacewatch	MAS	1.1 km	MPC · JPL
178557	1999 VY_{135}	—	November 9, 1999	Socorro	LINEAR	PHO	1.8 km	MPC · JPL
178558	1999 VE_{136}	—	November 9, 1999	Socorro	LINEAR	·	1.9 km	MPC · JPL
178559	1999 VR_{143}	—	November 11, 1999	Catalina	CSS	·	1.5 km	MPC · JPL
178560	1999 VS_{143}	—	November 11, 1999	Catalina	CSS	ERI	2.4 km	MPC · JPL
178561	1999 VQ_{159}	—	November 14, 1999	Socorro	LINEAR	·	1.5 km	MPC · JPL
178562	1999 VP_{160}	—	November 14, 1999	Socorro	LINEAR	·	1.5 km	MPC · JPL
178563	1999 VK_{167}	—	November 14, 1999	Socorro	LINEAR	MAS	970 m	MPC · JPL
178564	1999 VG_{175}	—	November 9, 1999	Kitt Peak	Spacewatch	·	1.7 km	MPC · JPL
178565	1999 VX_{176}	—	November 5, 1999	Socorro	LINEAR	·	1.3 km	MPC · JPL
178566	1999 VK_{182}	—	November 9, 1999	Socorro	LINEAR	·	1.5 km	MPC · JPL
178567	1999 VL_{187}	—	November 15, 1999	Socorro	LINEAR	V	1.1 km	MPC · JPL
178568	1999 VV_{207}	—	November 9, 1999	Kitt Peak	Spacewatch	·	1.6 km	MPC · JPL
178569	1999 VK_{211}	—	November 14, 1999	Catalina	CSS	V	1.0 km	MPC · JPL
178570	1999 VS_{212}	—	November 12, 1999	Socorro	LINEAR	·	1.9 km	MPC · JPL
178571	1999 WD_{6}	—	November 28, 1999	Višnjan Observatory	K. Korlević	EUN	1.7 km	MPC · JPL
178572	1999 WM_{10}	—	November 28, 1999	Kitt Peak	Spacewatch	·	3.0 km	MPC · JPL
178573	1999 WD_{17}	—	November 30, 1999	Kitt Peak	Spacewatch	·	1.1 km	MPC · JPL
178574	1999 WD_{26}	—	November 30, 1999	Kitt Peak	Spacewatch	NYS	1.7 km	MPC · JPL
178575	1999 XO	—	December 2, 1999	Kitt Peak	Spacewatch	·	1.2 km	MPC · JPL
178576	1999 XR_{5}	—	December 4, 1999	Catalina	CSS	NYS	1.5 km	MPC · JPL
178577	1999 XB_{29}	—	December 6, 1999	Socorro	LINEAR	NYS	1.7 km	MPC · JPL
178578	1999 XV_{42}	—	December 7, 1999	Socorro	LINEAR	·	1.5 km	MPC · JPL
178579	1999 XV_{51}	—	December 7, 1999	Socorro	LINEAR	·	1.1 km	MPC · JPL
178580	1999 XK_{59}	—	December 7, 1999	Socorro	LINEAR	NYS	1.9 km	MPC · JPL
178581	1999 XC_{66}	—	December 7, 1999	Socorro	LINEAR	·	1.3 km	MPC · JPL
178582	1999 XX_{114}	—	December 11, 1999	Socorro	LINEAR	·	3.1 km	MPC · JPL
178583	1999 XD_{129}	—	December 12, 1999	Socorro	LINEAR	·	1.9 km	MPC · JPL
178584	1999 XL_{166}	—	December 10, 1999	Socorro	LINEAR	·	2.2 km	MPC · JPL
178585	1999 XQ_{212}	—	December 14, 1999	Socorro	LINEAR	·	3.1 km	MPC · JPL
178586	1999 XO_{219}	—	December 15, 1999	Kitt Peak	Spacewatch	·	2.1 km	MPC · JPL
178587	1999 XA_{225}	—	December 13, 1999	Kitt Peak	Spacewatch	·	1.6 km	MPC · JPL
178588	1999 XC_{225}	—	December 13, 1999	Kitt Peak	Spacewatch	·	1.7 km	MPC · JPL
178589	1999 YJ_{3}	—	December 17, 1999	Socorro	LINEAR	H	860 m	MPC · JPL
178590	1999 YO_{23}	—	December 16, 1999	Kitt Peak	Spacewatch	NYS	1.4 km	MPC · JPL
178591	2000 AQ_{30}	—	January 3, 2000	Socorro	LINEAR	MAR	1.8 km	MPC · JPL
178592	2000 AU_{42}	—	January 4, 2000	Socorro	LINEAR	H	1.0 km	MPC · JPL
178593	2000 AX_{104}	—	January 5, 2000	Socorro	LINEAR	·	1.6 km	MPC · JPL
178594	2000 AO_{242}	—	January 7, 2000	Socorro	LINEAR	H	810 m	MPC · JPL
178595	2000 AU_{250}	—	January 3, 2000	Kitt Peak	Spacewatch	·	1.6 km	MPC · JPL
178596	2000 BF_{6}	—	January 28, 2000	Socorro	LINEAR	·	2.6 km	MPC · JPL
178597	2000 BF_{9}	—	January 26, 2000	Kitt Peak	Spacewatch	MAS	1.1 km	MPC · JPL
178598	2000 BH_{28}	—	January 31, 2000	Socorro	LINEAR	·	1.7 km	MPC · JPL
178599	2000 CK_{37}	—	February 3, 2000	Socorro	LINEAR	·	2.0 km	MPC · JPL
178600	2000 CX_{50}	—	February 2, 2000	Socorro	LINEAR	·	4.8 km	MPC · JPL

== 178601–178700 ==
back to top

Designation			Discovery			Properties		Ref
Permanent	Provisional	Named after	Date	Site	Discoverer(s)	Category	Diam.	Ref
178601	2000 CG_{59}	—	February 5, 2000	Socorro	LINEAR	AMO +1km	1.0 km	MPC · JPL
178602	2000 CT_{78}	—	February 8, 2000	Kitt Peak	Spacewatch	·	2.2 km	MPC · JPL
178603 Pinkine	2000 CV_{107}	Pinkine	February 5, 2000	Kitt Peak	M. W. Buie	NYS	2.1 km	MPC · JPL
178604	2000 CE_{139}	—	February 5, 2000	Kitt Peak	Spacewatch	NYS	2.7 km	MPC · JPL
178605	2000 DA_{17}	—	February 29, 2000	Socorro	LINEAR	·	1.6 km	MPC · JPL
178606	2000 DR_{55}	—	February 29, 2000	Socorro	LINEAR	·	1.2 km	MPC · JPL
178607	2000 DT_{56}	—	February 29, 2000	Socorro	LINEAR	·	3.7 km	MPC · JPL
178608	2000 DJ_{70}	—	February 29, 2000	Socorro	LINEAR	·	3.6 km	MPC · JPL
178609	2000 DH_{80}	—	February 28, 2000	Socorro	LINEAR	·	2.4 km	MPC · JPL
178610	2000 EX_{5}	—	March 2, 2000	Kitt Peak	Spacewatch	H	740 m	MPC · JPL
178611	2000 ER_{55}	—	March 5, 2000	Socorro	LINEAR	H	760 m	MPC · JPL
178612	2000 EQ_{74}	—	March 11, 2000	Kitt Peak	Spacewatch	·	1.8 km	MPC · JPL
178613	2000 EF_{78}	—	March 5, 2000	Socorro	LINEAR	·	1.2 km	MPC · JPL
178614	2000 EZ_{114}	—	March 10, 2000	Kitt Peak	Spacewatch	·	1.4 km	MPC · JPL
178615	2000 EL_{119}	—	March 11, 2000	Anderson Mesa	LONEOS	·	1.8 km	MPC · JPL
178616	2000 EN_{140}	—	March 2, 2000	Kitt Peak	Spacewatch	·	1.5 km	MPC · JPL
178617	2000 EB_{153}	—	March 6, 2000	Haleakala	NEAT	·	1.7 km	MPC · JPL
178618	2000 EQ_{168}	—	March 4, 2000	Socorro	LINEAR	H	820 m	MPC · JPL
178619	2000 FT	—	March 26, 2000	Socorro	LINEAR	H	760 m	MPC · JPL
178620	2000 FY_{14}	—	March 29, 2000	Socorro	LINEAR	H	1.0 km	MPC · JPL
178621	2000 FG_{33}	—	March 29, 2000	Socorro	LINEAR	·	1.7 km	MPC · JPL
178622	2000 FY_{38}	—	March 29, 2000	Socorro	LINEAR	(13314)	3.9 km	MPC · JPL
178623	2000 FW_{69}	—	March 27, 2000	Kitt Peak	Spacewatch	·	1.4 km	MPC · JPL
178624	2000 FY_{70}	—	March 29, 2000	Kitt Peak	Spacewatch	·	2.1 km	MPC · JPL
178625	2000 GH_{35}	—	April 5, 2000	Socorro	LINEAR	·	4.5 km	MPC · JPL
178626	2000 GT_{68}	—	April 5, 2000	Socorro	LINEAR	·	1.9 km	MPC · JPL
178627	2000 GU_{82}	—	April 7, 2000	Socorro	LINEAR	H	950 m	MPC · JPL
178628	2000 GZ_{115}	—	April 8, 2000	Socorro	LINEAR	·	1.7 km	MPC · JPL
178629	2000 GV_{141}	—	April 7, 2000	Anderson Mesa	LONEOS	EUN	1.8 km	MPC · JPL
178630	2000 GO_{153}	—	April 6, 2000	Anderson Mesa	LONEOS	·	1.7 km	MPC · JPL
178631	2000 HW_{11}	—	April 28, 2000	Socorro	LINEAR	·	2.3 km	MPC · JPL
178632	2000 HD_{31}	—	April 29, 2000	Socorro	LINEAR	·	1.8 km	MPC · JPL
178633	2000 HF_{33}	—	April 29, 2000	Socorro	LINEAR	·	2.8 km	MPC · JPL
178634	2000 HP_{81}	—	April 29, 2000	Anderson Mesa	LONEOS	H	990 m	MPC · JPL
178635	2000 HL_{89}	—	April 29, 2000	Socorro	LINEAR	EUN	1.9 km	MPC · JPL
178636	2000 JE_{6}	—	May 2, 2000	Socorro	LINEAR	H	1.2 km	MPC · JPL
178637	2000 JK_{19}	—	May 4, 2000	Socorro	LINEAR	·	1.5 km	MPC · JPL
178638	2000 JM_{20}	—	May 6, 2000	Socorro	LINEAR	·	1.7 km	MPC · JPL
178639	2000 JU_{38}	—	May 7, 2000	Socorro	LINEAR	JUN	1.6 km	MPC · JPL
178640	2000 JD_{47}	—	May 9, 2000	Socorro	LINEAR	·	1.9 km	MPC · JPL
178641	2000 JZ_{69}	—	May 2, 2000	Anderson Mesa	LONEOS	JUN	1.9 km	MPC · JPL
178642	2000 JC_{71}	—	May 1, 2000	Anderson Mesa	LONEOS	·	4.1 km	MPC · JPL
178643	2000 JE_{94}	—	May 2, 2000	Anderson Mesa	LONEOS	EUN	2.0 km	MPC · JPL
178644	2000 KO_{12}	—	May 28, 2000	Socorro	LINEAR	·	2.0 km	MPC · JPL
178645	2000 KD_{25}	—	May 28, 2000	Socorro	LINEAR	·	2.7 km	MPC · JPL
178646	2000 KW_{39}	—	May 25, 2000	Kitt Peak	Spacewatch	·	2.2 km	MPC · JPL
178647	2000 KD_{44}	—	May 26, 2000	Kitt Peak	Spacewatch	·	1.5 km	MPC · JPL
178648	2000 KQ_{54}	—	May 27, 2000	Anderson Mesa	LONEOS	·	3.3 km	MPC · JPL
178649	2000 KQ_{65}	—	May 27, 2000	Anderson Mesa	LONEOS	(194)	3.3 km	MPC · JPL
178650	2000 LZ_{10}	—	June 4, 2000	Socorro	LINEAR	·	1.9 km	MPC · JPL
178651	2000 NS_{4}	—	July 5, 2000	Kitt Peak	Spacewatch	·	3.9 km	MPC · JPL
178652	2000 NF_{7}	—	July 4, 2000	Kitt Peak	Spacewatch	·	4.5 km	MPC · JPL
178653	2000 OZ_{19}	—	July 30, 2000	Socorro	LINEAR	·	3.8 km	MPC · JPL
178654	2000 OW_{26}	—	July 23, 2000	Socorro	LINEAR	·	5.2 km	MPC · JPL
178655	2000 PO_{29}	—	August 1, 2000	Socorro	LINEAR	·	4.4 km	MPC · JPL
178656	2000 QV_{18}	—	August 24, 2000	Socorro	LINEAR	EOS	3.7 km	MPC · JPL
178657	2000 QZ_{18}	—	August 24, 2000	Socorro	LINEAR	·	2.5 km	MPC · JPL
178658	2000 QV_{34}	—	August 28, 2000	Socorro	LINEAR	·	5.0 km	MPC · JPL
178659	2000 QB_{40}	—	August 24, 2000	Socorro	LINEAR	·	3.9 km	MPC · JPL
178660	2000 QQ_{57}	—	August 26, 2000	Socorro	LINEAR	·	2.8 km	MPC · JPL
178661	2000 QC_{65}	—	August 28, 2000	Socorro	LINEAR	·	4.1 km	MPC · JPL
178662	2000 QP_{74}	—	August 24, 2000	Socorro	LINEAR	·	4.5 km	MPC · JPL
178663	2000 QA_{86}	—	August 25, 2000	Socorro	LINEAR	·	3.4 km	MPC · JPL
178664	2000 QR_{99}	—	August 28, 2000	Socorro	LINEAR	·	2.5 km	MPC · JPL
178665	2000 QF_{104}	—	August 28, 2000	Socorro	LINEAR	·	5.7 km	MPC · JPL
178666	2000 QT_{135}	—	August 26, 2000	Socorro	LINEAR	·	4.5 km	MPC · JPL
178667	2000 QW_{137}	—	August 31, 2000	Socorro	LINEAR	·	6.5 km	MPC · JPL
178668	2000 QL_{148}	—	August 27, 2000	Kvistaberg	Uppsala-DLR Asteroid Survey	EOS	3.3 km	MPC · JPL
178669	2000 QG_{149}	—	August 24, 2000	Socorro	LINEAR	·	3.6 km	MPC · JPL
178670	2000 QN_{159}	—	August 31, 2000	Socorro	LINEAR	·	4.3 km	MPC · JPL
178671	2000 QS_{171}	—	August 31, 2000	Socorro	LINEAR	·	3.0 km	MPC · JPL
178672	2000 QS_{178}	—	August 31, 2000	Socorro	LINEAR	EUP	6.3 km	MPC · JPL
178673	2000 QG_{185}	—	August 26, 2000	Socorro	LINEAR	(32418)	3.2 km	MPC · JPL
178674	2000 QR_{187}	—	August 26, 2000	Socorro	LINEAR	(18466)	3.2 km	MPC · JPL
178675	2000 QB_{200}	—	August 29, 2000	Socorro	LINEAR	·	2.6 km	MPC · JPL
178676	2000 QT_{221}	—	August 21, 2000	Anderson Mesa	LONEOS	·	3.2 km	MPC · JPL
178677	2000 QJ_{227}	—	August 31, 2000	Socorro	LINEAR	·	2.4 km	MPC · JPL
178678	2000 QW_{231}	—	August 29, 2000	Socorro	LINEAR	EOS	3.2 km	MPC · JPL
178679 Piquette	2000 QT_{247}	Piquette	August 28, 2000	Cerro Tololo	M. W. Buie	THM	2.2 km	MPC · JPL
178680	2000 RB_{9}	—	September 2, 2000	Loomberah	G. J. Garradd	EOS	2.7 km	MPC · JPL
178681	2000 RF_{17}	—	September 1, 2000	Socorro	LINEAR	·	4.3 km	MPC · JPL
178682	2000 RV_{32}	—	September 1, 2000	Socorro	LINEAR	·	4.5 km	MPC · JPL
178683	2000 RQ_{84}	—	September 2, 2000	Anderson Mesa	LONEOS	·	5.9 km	MPC · JPL
178684	2000 RP_{87}	—	September 2, 2000	Anderson Mesa	LONEOS	·	3.9 km	MPC · JPL
178685	2000 RB_{94}	—	September 4, 2000	Kitt Peak	Spacewatch	·	2.8 km	MPC · JPL
178686	2000 ST_{10}	—	September 24, 2000	Prescott	P. G. Comba	·	5.6 km	MPC · JPL
178687	2000 SX_{15}	—	September 23, 2000	Socorro	LINEAR	EOS	3.2 km	MPC · JPL
178688	2000 SQ_{16}	—	September 23, 2000	Socorro	LINEAR	EOS	3.5 km	MPC · JPL
178689	2000 SL_{18}	—	September 23, 2000	Socorro	LINEAR	·	5.2 km	MPC · JPL
178690	2000 SY_{26}	—	September 23, 2000	Socorro	LINEAR	·	4.1 km	MPC · JPL
178691	2000 SB_{27}	—	September 23, 2000	Socorro	LINEAR	NAE	5.8 km	MPC · JPL
178692	2000 SV_{28}	—	September 23, 2000	Socorro	LINEAR	·	7.4 km	MPC · JPL
178693	2000 SD_{31}	—	September 24, 2000	Socorro	LINEAR	·	4.1 km	MPC · JPL
178694	2000 SC_{42}	—	September 24, 2000	Socorro	LINEAR	·	4.2 km	MPC · JPL
178695	2000 SH_{55}	—	September 24, 2000	Socorro	LINEAR	·	3.1 km	MPC · JPL
178696	2000 SB_{58}	—	September 24, 2000	Socorro	LINEAR	·	3.6 km	MPC · JPL
178697	2000 SF_{60}	—	September 24, 2000	Socorro	LINEAR	KOR	2.7 km	MPC · JPL
178698	2000 SP_{66}	—	September 24, 2000	Socorro	LINEAR	KOR	2.8 km	MPC · JPL
178699	2000 SS_{71}	—	September 24, 2000	Socorro	LINEAR	THB	3.8 km	MPC · JPL
178700	2000 SR_{88}	—	September 24, 2000	Socorro	LINEAR	NAE ·	5.6 km	MPC · JPL

== 178701–178800 ==
back to top

Designation			Discovery			Properties		Ref
Permanent	Provisional	Named after	Date	Site	Discoverer(s)	Category	Diam.	Ref
178701	2000 SY_{93}	—	September 23, 2000	Socorro	LINEAR	·	6.0 km	MPC · JPL
178702	2000 SY_{100}	—	September 23, 2000	Socorro	LINEAR	TIR	4.8 km	MPC · JPL
178703	2000 ST_{121}	—	September 24, 2000	Socorro	LINEAR	·	4.1 km	MPC · JPL
178704	2000 SB_{133}	—	September 23, 2000	Socorro	LINEAR	·	4.0 km	MPC · JPL
178705	2000 ST_{143}	—	September 24, 2000	Socorro	LINEAR	·	5.1 km	MPC · JPL
178706	2000 SK_{168}	—	September 23, 2000	Socorro	LINEAR	·	4.2 km	MPC · JPL
178707	2000 SW_{183}	—	September 20, 2000	Haleakala	NEAT	·	2.8 km	MPC · JPL
178708	2000 SD_{195}	—	September 24, 2000	Socorro	LINEAR	EOS	2.9 km	MPC · JPL
178709	2000 SO_{201}	—	September 24, 2000	Socorro	LINEAR	EOS	2.7 km	MPC · JPL
178710	2000 SS_{207}	—	September 24, 2000	Socorro	LINEAR	·	4.6 km	MPC · JPL
178711	2000 SL_{209}	—	September 25, 2000	Socorro	LINEAR	·	5.5 km	MPC · JPL
178712	2000 SN_{220}	—	September 26, 2000	Socorro	LINEAR	·	5.1 km	MPC · JPL
178713	2000 SG_{230}	—	September 28, 2000	Socorro	LINEAR	·	3.3 km	MPC · JPL
178714	2000 SJ_{235}	—	September 24, 2000	Socorro	LINEAR	DOR	3.3 km	MPC · JPL
178715	2000 SX_{236}	—	September 24, 2000	Socorro	LINEAR	EOS	2.8 km	MPC · JPL
178716	2000 SW_{245}	—	September 24, 2000	Socorro	LINEAR	·	2.7 km	MPC · JPL
178717	2000 SA_{260}	—	September 24, 2000	Socorro	LINEAR	·	8.2 km	MPC · JPL
178718	2000 SQ_{260}	—	September 24, 2000	Socorro	LINEAR	·	4.1 km	MPC · JPL
178719	2000 SV_{262}	—	September 25, 2000	Socorro	LINEAR	·	3.8 km	MPC · JPL
178720	2000 SE_{263}	—	September 25, 2000	Socorro	LINEAR	EOS	3.3 km	MPC · JPL
178721	2000 SZ_{264}	—	September 26, 2000	Socorro	LINEAR	·	1.0 km	MPC · JPL
178722	2000 SL_{268}	—	September 27, 2000	Socorro	LINEAR	EUP	8.6 km	MPC · JPL
178723	2000 SM_{272}	—	September 28, 2000	Socorro	LINEAR	EOS	2.9 km	MPC · JPL
178724	2000 SW_{297}	—	September 28, 2000	Socorro	LINEAR	·	4.1 km	MPC · JPL
178725	2000 SG_{298}	—	September 28, 2000	Socorro	LINEAR	EOS	2.9 km	MPC · JPL
178726	2000 SZ_{298}	—	September 28, 2000	Socorro	LINEAR	·	4.7 km	MPC · JPL
178727	2000 SA_{300}	—	September 28, 2000	Socorro	LINEAR	·	4.2 km	MPC · JPL
178728	2000 SQ_{306}	—	September 30, 2000	Socorro	LINEAR	fast	3.6 km	MPC · JPL
178729	2000 SP_{311}	—	September 27, 2000	Socorro	LINEAR	EUP	7.6 km	MPC · JPL
178730	2000 ST_{322}	—	September 28, 2000	Kitt Peak	Spacewatch	·	5.9 km	MPC · JPL
178731	2000 SM_{340}	—	September 24, 2000	Socorro	LINEAR	·	3.3 km	MPC · JPL
178732	2000 SJ_{351}	—	September 29, 2000	Anderson Mesa	LONEOS	·	4.7 km	MPC · JPL
178733	2000 SP_{359}	—	September 26, 2000	Anderson Mesa	LONEOS	EOS	3.0 km	MPC · JPL
178734	2000 TB_{2}	—	October 3, 2000	Bisei SG Center	BATTeRS	LIX	6.0 km	MPC · JPL
178735	2000 TN_{13}	—	October 1, 2000	Socorro	LINEAR	THM	3.1 km	MPC · JPL
178736	2000 TH_{21}	—	October 1, 2000	Socorro	LINEAR	·	4.6 km	MPC · JPL
178737	2000 TG_{23}	—	October 1, 2000	Socorro	LINEAR	·	4.0 km	MPC · JPL
178738	2000 TG_{29}	—	October 3, 2000	Socorro	LINEAR	TIR	6.7 km	MPC · JPL
178739	2000 TT_{37}	—	October 1, 2000	Socorro	LINEAR	·	5.0 km	MPC · JPL
178740	2000 TG_{46}	—	October 1, 2000	Anderson Mesa	LONEOS	(31811)	4.2 km	MPC · JPL
178741	2000 TK_{49}	—	October 1, 2000	Anderson Mesa	LONEOS	·	2.3 km	MPC · JPL
178742	2000 TF_{51}	—	October 1, 2000	Socorro	LINEAR	EOS	3.9 km	MPC · JPL
178743	2000 TF_{66}	—	October 1, 2000	Socorro	LINEAR	THM	3.4 km	MPC · JPL
178744	2000 UK_{33}	—	October 30, 2000	Kitt Peak	Spacewatch	EOS	3.1 km	MPC · JPL
178745	2000 UF_{35}	—	October 24, 2000	Socorro	LINEAR	VER	6.2 km	MPC · JPL
178746	2000 UL_{48}	—	October 24, 2000	Socorro	LINEAR	URS ·	4.2 km	MPC · JPL
178747	2000 UT_{69}	—	October 25, 2000	Socorro	LINEAR	EOS	3.5 km	MPC · JPL
178748	2000 UL_{83}	—	October 30, 2000	Socorro	LINEAR	HYG	3.7 km	MPC · JPL
178749	2000 UO_{86}	—	October 31, 2000	Socorro	LINEAR	EOS	4.1 km	MPC · JPL
178750	2000 UO_{101}	—	October 25, 2000	Socorro	LINEAR	EOS	3.6 km	MPC · JPL
178751	2000 UE_{113}	—	October 19, 2000	Kitt Peak	Spacewatch	·	3.2 km	MPC · JPL
178752	2000 VO_{2}	—	November 1, 2000	Ondřejov	P. Pravec	EUP	7.8 km	MPC · JPL
178753	2000 VN_{5}	—	November 1, 2000	Socorro	LINEAR	·	1.6 km	MPC · JPL
178754	2000 VD_{14}	—	November 1, 2000	Socorro	LINEAR	EOS	3.7 km	MPC · JPL
178755	2000 VL_{42}	—	November 1, 2000	Socorro	LINEAR	HYG	4.2 km	MPC · JPL
178756	2000 VW_{42}	—	November 1, 2000	Socorro	LINEAR	EOS	4.3 km	MPC · JPL
178757	2000 VA_{44}	—	November 1, 2000	Socorro	LINEAR	·	3.8 km	MPC · JPL
178758	2000 VL_{45}	—	November 1, 2000	Socorro	LINEAR	·	1.0 km	MPC · JPL
178759	2000 VC_{51}	—	November 3, 2000	Socorro	LINEAR	·	4.7 km	MPC · JPL
178760	2000 VQ_{64}	—	November 1, 2000	Socorro	LINEAR	·	3.9 km	MPC · JPL
178761	2000 WW_{3}	—	November 19, 2000	Socorro	LINEAR	·	4.7 km	MPC · JPL
178762	2000 WN_{4}	—	November 19, 2000	Socorro	LINEAR	·	4.0 km	MPC · JPL
178763	2000 WF_{5}	—	November 19, 2000	Socorro	LINEAR	V	930 m	MPC · JPL
178764	2000 WM_{14}	—	November 20, 2000	Socorro	LINEAR	HYG	5.4 km	MPC · JPL
178765	2000 WT_{14}	—	November 20, 2000	Socorro	LINEAR	·	1.5 km	MPC · JPL
178766	2000 WP_{25}	—	November 21, 2000	Socorro	LINEAR	·	1.1 km	MPC · JPL
178767	2000 WV_{45}	—	November 21, 2000	Socorro	LINEAR	·	3.7 km	MPC · JPL
178768	2000 WK_{52}	—	November 27, 2000	Kitt Peak	Spacewatch	·	5.9 km	MPC · JPL
178769	2000 WD_{57}	—	November 21, 2000	Socorro	LINEAR	·	1.2 km	MPC · JPL
178770	2000 WY_{111}	—	November 20, 2000	Socorro	LINEAR	VER	6.2 km	MPC · JPL
178771	2000 WJ_{187}	—	November 19, 2000	Anderson Mesa	LONEOS	·	5.1 km	MPC · JPL
178772	2000 WB_{189}	—	November 18, 2000	Anderson Mesa	LONEOS	EOS	3.7 km	MPC · JPL
178773	2000 YH_{26}	—	December 23, 2000	Socorro	LINEAR	·	1.1 km	MPC · JPL
178774	2000 YC_{52}	—	December 30, 2000	Socorro	LINEAR	·	1.2 km	MPC · JPL
178775	2000 YR_{77}	—	December 30, 2000	Socorro	LINEAR	·	1.1 km	MPC · JPL
178776	2000 YZ_{94}	—	December 30, 2000	Socorro	LINEAR	·	1.2 km	MPC · JPL
178777	2000 YA_{108}	—	December 30, 2000	Socorro	LINEAR	·	4.5 km	MPC · JPL
178778	2000 YC_{140}	—	December 31, 2000	Anderson Mesa	LONEOS	PHO	1.7 km	MPC · JPL
178779	2001 AG_{13}	—	January 2, 2001	Socorro	LINEAR	PHO	1.8 km	MPC · JPL
178780	2001 AV_{29}	—	January 4, 2001	Socorro	LINEAR	·	2.3 km	MPC · JPL
178781	2001 AE_{34}	—	January 4, 2001	Socorro	LINEAR	·	1.2 km	MPC · JPL
178782	2001 AA_{46}	—	January 15, 2001	Socorro	LINEAR	PHO	1.7 km	MPC · JPL
178783	2001 BY_{2}	—	January 18, 2001	Socorro	LINEAR	·	1.9 km	MPC · JPL
178784	2001 BT_{3}	—	January 18, 2001	Socorro	LINEAR	·	1.3 km	MPC · JPL
178785	2001 BE_{83}	—	January 21, 2001	Socorro	LINEAR	·	1.0 km	MPC · JPL
178786	2001 CF_{24}	—	February 1, 2001	Anderson Mesa	LONEOS	·	1.2 km	MPC · JPL
178787	2001 CR_{45}	—	February 15, 2001	Socorro	LINEAR	·	5.4 km	MPC · JPL
178788	2001 CY_{49}	—	February 3, 2001	Kitt Peak	Spacewatch	·	1.5 km	MPC · JPL
178789	2001 DE	—	February 16, 2001	Črni Vrh	Mikuž, H.	·	1.4 km	MPC · JPL
178790	2001 DY_{1}	—	February 16, 2001	Kitt Peak	Spacewatch	·	960 m	MPC · JPL
178791	2001 DU_{5}	—	February 16, 2001	Socorro	LINEAR	·	1.0 km	MPC · JPL
178792	2001 DH_{14}	—	February 19, 2001	Socorro	LINEAR	PHO	1.4 km	MPC · JPL
178793	2001 DX_{33}	—	February 17, 2001	Socorro	LINEAR	·	920 m	MPC · JPL
178794	2001 DD_{47}	—	February 19, 2001	Socorro	LINEAR	·	1.4 km	MPC · JPL
178795	2001 DQ_{66}	—	February 19, 2001	Socorro	LINEAR	·	1.0 km	MPC · JPL
178796 Posztoczky	2001 DQ_{86}	Posztoczky	February 27, 2001	Piszkéstető	K. Sárneczky, Derekas, A.	·	1.3 km	MPC · JPL
178797	2001 DO_{92}	—	February 19, 2001	Anderson Mesa	LONEOS	·	1.2 km	MPC · JPL
178798	2001 ED_{3}	—	March 3, 2001	Kitt Peak	Spacewatch	V	800 m	MPC · JPL
178799	2001 EG_{4}	—	March 2, 2001	Anderson Mesa	LONEOS	·	1.1 km	MPC · JPL
178800	2001 EB_{8}	—	March 2, 2001	Anderson Mesa	LONEOS	·	1.7 km	MPC · JPL

== 178801–178900 ==
back to top

Designation			Discovery			Properties		Ref
Permanent	Provisional	Named after	Date	Site	Discoverer(s)	Category	Diam.	Ref
178801	2001 ES_{23}	—	March 15, 2001	Haleakala	NEAT	NYS	1.5 km	MPC · JPL
178802	2001 FN	—	March 16, 2001	Socorro	LINEAR	·	1.2 km	MPC · JPL
178803 Kristenjohnson	2001 FA_{4}	Kristenjohnson	March 19, 2001	Junk Bond	D. Healy	MAS	750 m	MPC · JPL
178804	2001 FZ_{31}	—	March 22, 2001	Kitt Peak	Spacewatch	·	1.5 km	MPC · JPL
178805	2001 FS_{41}	—	March 18, 2001	Socorro	LINEAR	·	1.2 km	MPC · JPL
178806	2001 FM_{59}	—	March 19, 2001	Socorro	LINEAR	·	1.2 km	MPC · JPL
178807	2001 FE_{60}	—	March 19, 2001	Socorro	LINEAR	·	1.4 km	MPC · JPL
178808	2001 FF_{63}	—	March 19, 2001	Socorro	LINEAR	·	1.5 km	MPC · JPL
178809	2001 FF_{76}	—	March 19, 2001	Socorro	LINEAR	·	2.5 km	MPC · JPL
178810	2001 FP_{76}	—	March 19, 2001	Socorro	LINEAR	·	1.5 km	MPC · JPL
178811	2001 FJ_{82}	—	March 23, 2001	Socorro	LINEAR	·	2.0 km	MPC · JPL
178812	2001 FC_{89}	—	March 27, 2001	Kitt Peak	Spacewatch	V	880 m	MPC · JPL
178813	2001 FJ_{89}	—	March 27, 2001	Kitt Peak	Spacewatch	·	1 km	MPC · JPL
178814	2001 FM_{98}	—	March 16, 2001	Socorro	LINEAR	·	1.5 km	MPC · JPL
178815	2001 FQ_{108}	—	March 18, 2001	Socorro	LINEAR	·	1.9 km	MPC · JPL
178816	2001 FN_{114}	—	March 19, 2001	Anderson Mesa	LONEOS	V	1.1 km	MPC · JPL
178817	2001 FZ_{120}	—	March 26, 2001	Socorro	LINEAR	·	3.8 km	MPC · JPL
178818	2001 FK_{122}	—	March 23, 2001	Anderson Mesa	LONEOS	·	1.3 km	MPC · JPL
178819	2001 FX_{153}	—	March 26, 2001	Haleakala	NEAT	NYS	1.2 km	MPC · JPL
178820	2001 FR_{158}	—	March 27, 2001	Haleakala	NEAT	(2076)	2.3 km	MPC · JPL
178821	2001 FX_{161}	—	March 30, 2001	Kitt Peak	Spacewatch	·	1.7 km	MPC · JPL
178822	2001 FV_{164}	—	March 18, 2001	Haleakala	NEAT	·	1.3 km	MPC · JPL
178823	2001 FP_{176}	—	March 16, 2001	Socorro	LINEAR	PHO	1.5 km	MPC · JPL
178824	2001 FF_{189}	—	March 16, 2001	Socorro	LINEAR	·	3.4 km	MPC · JPL
178825	2001 GB_{1}	—	April 13, 2001	Socorro	LINEAR	PHO	1.6 km	MPC · JPL
178826	2001 GN_{3}	—	April 15, 2001	Socorro	LINEAR	PHO	2.6 km	MPC · JPL
178827	2001 GR_{3}	—	April 15, 2001	Socorro	LINEAR	·	1.4 km	MPC · JPL
178828	2001 GL_{7}	—	April 15, 2001	Socorro	LINEAR	·	1.9 km	MPC · JPL
178829	2001 GQ_{10}	—	April 15, 2001	Haleakala	NEAT	NYS	1.4 km	MPC · JPL
178830 Anne-Véronique	2001 HT	Anne-Véronique	April 18, 2001	Saint-Véran	St. Veran	MAS	890 m	MPC · JPL
178831	2001 HL_{3}	—	April 17, 2001	Socorro	LINEAR	·	2.4 km	MPC · JPL
178832	2001 HR_{3}	—	April 17, 2001	Socorro	LINEAR	ERI	2.4 km	MPC · JPL
178833	2001 HN_{12}	—	April 18, 2001	Socorro	LINEAR	·	2.9 km	MPC · JPL
178834	2001 HA_{16}	—	April 24, 2001	Ondřejov	P. Kušnirák, P. Pravec	·	2.1 km	MPC · JPL
178835	2001 HT_{17}	—	April 24, 2001	Kitt Peak	Spacewatch	·	1.6 km	MPC · JPL
178836	2001 HD_{18}	—	April 24, 2001	Kitt Peak	Spacewatch	·	1.7 km	MPC · JPL
178837	2001 HN_{20}	—	April 21, 2001	Socorro	LINEAR	·	2.6 km	MPC · JPL
178838	2001 HA_{21}	—	April 23, 2001	Socorro	LINEAR	NYS	1.7 km	MPC · JPL
178839	2001 HB_{21}	—	April 23, 2001	Socorro	LINEAR	·	1.9 km	MPC · JPL
178840	2001 HN_{25}	—	April 26, 2001	Kitt Peak	Spacewatch	·	2.2 km	MPC · JPL
178841	2001 HZ_{43}	—	April 16, 2001	Anderson Mesa	LONEOS	MAS	1.2 km	MPC · JPL
178842	2001 HQ_{50}	—	April 23, 2001	Anderson Mesa	LONEOS	·	1.3 km	MPC · JPL
178843	2001 HL_{52}	—	April 23, 2001	Socorro	LINEAR	·	1.8 km	MPC · JPL
178844	2001 HG_{53}	—	April 23, 2001	Socorro	LINEAR	ERI	3.6 km	MPC · JPL
178845	2001 HX_{66}	—	April 26, 2001	Anderson Mesa	LONEOS	·	1.7 km	MPC · JPL
178846	2001 JT	—	May 10, 2001	Ondřejov	L. Kotková	·	1.3 km	MPC · JPL
178847	2001 JK_{3}	—	May 15, 2001	Anderson Mesa	LONEOS	·	1.8 km	MPC · JPL
178848	2001 JA_{4}	—	May 15, 2001	Haleakala	NEAT	MAS	1.2 km	MPC · JPL
178849	2001 JZ_{7}	—	May 15, 2001	Anderson Mesa	LONEOS	·	2.2 km	MPC · JPL
178850	2001 JT_{9}	—	May 15, 2001	Haleakala	NEAT	ERI	2.6 km	MPC · JPL
178851	2001 KU_{4}	—	May 17, 2001	Socorro	LINEAR	·	2.6 km	MPC · JPL
178852	2001 KM_{14}	—	May 18, 2001	Socorro	LINEAR	NYS	1.8 km	MPC · JPL
178853	2001 KR_{14}	—	May 18, 2001	Socorro	LINEAR	·	2.6 km	MPC · JPL
178854	2001 KR_{16}	—	May 18, 2001	Socorro	LINEAR	·	1.9 km	MPC · JPL
178855	2001 KL_{18}	—	May 21, 2001	Kitt Peak	Spacewatch	·	1.9 km	MPC · JPL
178856	2001 KY_{19}	—	May 22, 2001	Socorro	LINEAR	·	2.3 km	MPC · JPL
178857	2001 KD_{20}	—	May 18, 2001	Haleakala	NEAT	·	3.4 km	MPC · JPL
178858	2001 KM_{23}	—	May 17, 2001	Socorro	LINEAR	·	2.0 km	MPC · JPL
178859	2001 KL_{24}	—	May 17, 2001	Socorro	LINEAR	·	1.5 km	MPC · JPL
178860	2001 KZ_{42}	—	May 22, 2001	Socorro	LINEAR	·	3.3 km	MPC · JPL
178861	2001 KD_{57}	—	May 23, 2001	Socorro	LINEAR	·	2.0 km	MPC · JPL
178862	2001 KQ_{62}	—	May 18, 2001	Anderson Mesa	LONEOS	·	4.2 km	MPC · JPL
178863	2001 KK_{63}	—	May 18, 2001	Haleakala	NEAT	SUL	2.8 km	MPC · JPL
178864	2001 KV_{68}	—	May 21, 2001	Anderson Mesa	LONEOS	·	2.4 km	MPC · JPL
178865	2001 KF_{70}	—	May 23, 2001	Socorro	LINEAR	·	2.0 km	MPC · JPL
178866	2001 KA_{75}	—	May 26, 2001	Socorro	LINEAR	·	2.2 km	MPC · JPL
178867	2001 LA_{7}	—	June 15, 2001	Socorro	LINEAR	·	6.8 km	MPC · JPL
178868	2001 MU_{4}	—	June 17, 2001	Palomar	NEAT	·	2.2 km	MPC · JPL
178869	2001 MD_{6}	—	June 19, 2001	Palomar	NEAT	·	2.1 km	MPC · JPL
178870	2001 MK_{6}	—	June 21, 2001	Palomar	NEAT	·	2.7 km	MPC · JPL
178871	2001 MA_{8}	—	June 21, 2001	Palomar	NEAT	AMO +1km	1.0 km	MPC · JPL
178872	2001 MZ_{13}	—	June 24, 2001	Kitt Peak	Spacewatch	·	2.4 km	MPC · JPL
178873	2001 MB_{21}	—	June 26, 2001	Palomar	NEAT	EUN	2.0 km	MPC · JPL
178874	2001 MF_{23}	—	June 28, 2001	Haleakala	NEAT	·	2.1 km	MPC · JPL
178875	2001 MW_{23}	—	June 27, 2001	Haleakala	NEAT	·	3.9 km	MPC · JPL
178876	2001 NS_{9}	—	July 14, 2001	Haleakala	NEAT	·	3.0 km	MPC · JPL
178877	2001 NF_{13}	—	July 12, 2001	Palomar	NEAT	·	2.2 km	MPC · JPL
178878	2001 NA_{16}	—	July 14, 2001	Palomar	NEAT	EUN	1.8 km	MPC · JPL
178879	2001 NL_{16}	—	July 14, 2001	Haleakala	NEAT	PHO	2.6 km	MPC · JPL
178880	2001 NU_{17}	—	July 14, 2001	Haleakala	NEAT	·	1.8 km	MPC · JPL
178881	2001 OY	—	July 17, 2001	Haleakala	NEAT	·	1.8 km	MPC · JPL
178882	2001 OH_{6}	—	July 17, 2001	Anderson Mesa	LONEOS	EUN	1.8 km	MPC · JPL
178883	2001 OA_{11}	—	July 20, 2001	Palomar	NEAT	·	2.3 km	MPC · JPL
178884	2001 OZ_{18}	—	July 17, 2001	Haleakala	NEAT	·	1.8 km	MPC · JPL
178885	2001 OD_{20}	—	July 19, 2001	Anderson Mesa	LONEOS	GEF	2.3 km	MPC · JPL
178886	2001 OD_{24}	—	July 16, 2001	Anderson Mesa	LONEOS	·	2.0 km	MPC · JPL
178887	2001 OU_{27}	—	July 18, 2001	Palomar	NEAT	·	2.6 km	MPC · JPL
178888	2001 OW_{32}	—	July 19, 2001	Palomar	NEAT	·	2.4 km	MPC · JPL
178889	2001 OC_{34}	—	July 19, 2001	Palomar	NEAT	·	2.2 km	MPC · JPL
178890	2001 OC_{40}	—	July 20, 2001	Palomar	NEAT	·	2.9 km	MPC · JPL
178891	2001 OU_{40}	—	July 20, 2001	Palomar	NEAT	EOS	3.0 km	MPC · JPL
178892	2001 OA_{42}	—	July 22, 2001	Palomar	NEAT	H	890 m	MPC · JPL
178893	2001 OD_{43}	—	July 22, 2001	Palomar	NEAT	·	2.7 km	MPC · JPL
178894	2001 OZ_{48}	—	July 16, 2001	Haleakala	NEAT	·	1.5 km	MPC · JPL
178895	2001 ON_{49}	—	July 17, 2001	Anderson Mesa	LONEOS	·	2.2 km	MPC · JPL
178896	2001 OG_{58}	—	July 20, 2001	Anderson Mesa	LONEOS	·	2.5 km	MPC · JPL
178897	2001 ON_{61}	—	July 21, 2001	Haleakala	NEAT	·	3.5 km	MPC · JPL
178898	2001 OR_{70}	—	July 19, 2001	Anderson Mesa	LONEOS	EUN	2.2 km	MPC · JPL
178899	2001 OF_{71}	—	July 20, 2001	Palomar	NEAT	·	3.6 km	MPC · JPL
178900	2001 OL_{80}	—	July 29, 2001	Palomar	NEAT	H	960 m	MPC · JPL

== 178901–179000 ==
back to top

Designation			Discovery			Properties		Ref
Permanent	Provisional	Named after	Date	Site	Discoverer(s)	Category	Diam.	Ref
178901	2001 OE_{83}	—	July 27, 2001	Palomar	NEAT	·	2.3 km	MPC · JPL
178902	2001 OD_{90}	—	July 23, 2001	Haleakala	NEAT	·	2.7 km	MPC · JPL
178903	2001 OP_{90}	—	July 25, 2001	Haleakala	NEAT	·	2.0 km	MPC · JPL
178904	2001 OO_{93}	—	July 25, 2001	Haleakala	NEAT	MAR	2.9 km	MPC · JPL
178905	2001 OV_{93}	—	July 26, 2001	Palomar	NEAT	·	1.4 km	MPC · JPL
178906	2001 OV_{99}	—	July 27, 2001	Anderson Mesa	LONEOS	slow	2.2 km	MPC · JPL
178907	2001 OE_{111}	—	July 20, 2001	Palomar	NEAT	MAR	2.6 km	MPC · JPL
178908	2001 PD_{4}	—	August 5, 2001	Haleakala	NEAT	H	1.2 km	MPC · JPL
178909	2001 PL_{18}	—	August 9, 2001	Palomar	NEAT	·	3.5 km	MPC · JPL
178910	2001 PJ_{21}	—	August 10, 2001	Haleakala	NEAT	(5)	2.2 km	MPC · JPL
178911	2001 PZ_{23}	—	August 11, 2001	Haleakala	NEAT	·	2.0 km	MPC · JPL
178912	2001 PG_{27}	—	August 11, 2001	Haleakala	NEAT	·	1.9 km	MPC · JPL
178913	2001 PU_{32}	—	August 10, 2001	Palomar	NEAT	·	2.9 km	MPC · JPL
178914	2001 PN_{37}	—	August 11, 2001	Palomar	NEAT	·	3.2 km	MPC · JPL
178915	2001 PK_{63}	—	August 13, 2001	Haleakala	NEAT	·	2.8 km	MPC · JPL
178916	2001 QO_{3}	—	August 16, 2001	Socorro	LINEAR	·	3.4 km	MPC · JPL
178917	2001 QP_{4}	—	August 16, 2001	Socorro	LINEAR	·	2.1 km	MPC · JPL
178918	2001 QZ_{4}	—	August 16, 2001	Socorro	LINEAR	·	2.5 km	MPC · JPL
178919	2001 QT_{11}	—	August 16, 2001	Socorro	LINEAR	(5)	1.8 km	MPC · JPL
178920	2001 QO_{14}	—	August 16, 2001	Socorro	LINEAR	·	2.7 km	MPC · JPL
178921	2001 QP_{21}	—	August 16, 2001	Socorro	LINEAR	ADE	4.5 km	MPC · JPL
178922	2001 QE_{24}	—	August 16, 2001	Socorro	LINEAR	·	3.9 km	MPC · JPL
178923	2001 QU_{25}	—	August 16, 2001	Socorro	LINEAR	H	950 m	MPC · JPL
178924	2001 QR_{27}	—	August 16, 2001	Socorro	LINEAR	·	2.1 km	MPC · JPL
178925	2001 QE_{30}	—	August 16, 2001	Socorro	LINEAR	·	2.9 km	MPC · JPL
178926	2001 QP_{33}	—	August 16, 2001	Socorro	LINEAR	H	870 m	MPC · JPL
178927	2001 QS_{35}	—	August 16, 2001	Socorro	LINEAR	·	1.6 km	MPC · JPL
178928	2001 QP_{41}	—	August 16, 2001	Socorro	LINEAR	·	1.7 km	MPC · JPL
178929	2001 QC_{48}	—	August 16, 2001	Socorro	LINEAR	(5)	2.1 km	MPC · JPL
178930	2001 QO_{53}	—	August 16, 2001	Socorro	LINEAR	·	2.2 km	MPC · JPL
178931	2001 QJ_{54}	—	August 16, 2001	Socorro	LINEAR	·	1.9 km	MPC · JPL
178932	2001 QY_{58}	—	August 17, 2001	Socorro	LINEAR	NEM	2.3 km	MPC · JPL
178933	2001 QV_{66}	—	August 17, 2001	Socorro	LINEAR	·	2.3 km	MPC · JPL
178934	2001 QL_{67}	—	August 19, 2001	Socorro	LINEAR	(5)	1.9 km	MPC · JPL
178935	2001 QY_{68}	—	August 17, 2001	Socorro	LINEAR	ADE	3.3 km	MPC · JPL
178936	2001 QA_{81}	—	August 17, 2001	Socorro	LINEAR	·	3.6 km	MPC · JPL
178937	2001 QD_{82}	—	August 17, 2001	Socorro	LINEAR	·	3.4 km	MPC · JPL
178938	2001 QA_{89}	—	August 22, 2001	Desert Eagle	W. K. Y. Yeung	·	1.7 km	MPC · JPL
178939	2001 QP_{89}	—	August 16, 2001	Palomar	NEAT	·	4.9 km	MPC · JPL
178940	2001 QG_{98}	—	August 19, 2001	Socorro	LINEAR	·	2.4 km	MPC · JPL
178941	2001 QY_{100}	—	August 19, 2001	Haleakala	NEAT	H	950 m	MPC · JPL
178942	2001 QK_{103}	—	August 19, 2001	Socorro	LINEAR	·	1.9 km	MPC · JPL
178943	2001 QA_{111}	—	August 25, 2001	Pla D'Arguines	R. Ferrando	·	3.8 km	MPC · JPL
178944	2001 QA_{121}	—	August 19, 2001	Socorro	LINEAR	·	2.4 km	MPC · JPL
178945	2001 QP_{122}	—	August 19, 2001	Socorro	LINEAR	NYS	1.6 km	MPC · JPL
178946	2001 QV_{123}	—	August 19, 2001	Socorro	LINEAR	·	2.0 km	MPC · JPL
178947	2001 QG_{124}	—	August 19, 2001	Socorro	LINEAR	·	2.0 km	MPC · JPL
178948	2001 QJ_{130}	—	August 20, 2001	Socorro	LINEAR	·	1.8 km	MPC · JPL
178949	2001 QM_{132}	—	August 20, 2001	Socorro	LINEAR	·	2.3 km	MPC · JPL
178950	2001 QK_{136}	—	August 22, 2001	Socorro	LINEAR	BRU	4.7 km	MPC · JPL
178951	2001 QP_{149}	—	August 22, 2001	Haleakala	NEAT	·	2.9 km	MPC · JPL
178952	2001 QO_{151}	—	August 24, 2001	Socorro	LINEAR	·	3.7 km	MPC · JPL
178953	2001 QB_{163}	—	August 31, 2001	Palomar	NEAT	·	3.6 km	MPC · JPL
178954	2001 QT_{166}	—	August 24, 2001	Haleakala	NEAT	·	4.2 km	MPC · JPL
178955	2001 QH_{180}	—	August 25, 2001	Palomar	NEAT	ADE	5.1 km	MPC · JPL
178956	2001 QN_{185}	—	August 21, 2001	Kitt Peak	Spacewatch	·	2.1 km	MPC · JPL
178957	2001 QO_{186}	—	August 21, 2001	Palomar	NEAT	H	790 m	MPC · JPL
178958	2001 QG_{188}	—	August 21, 2001	Haleakala	NEAT	·	8.1 km	MPC · JPL
178959	2001 QK_{188}	—	August 22, 2001	Kitt Peak	Spacewatch	·	1.7 km	MPC · JPL
178960	2001 QH_{189}	—	August 22, 2001	Socorro	LINEAR	·	3.6 km	MPC · JPL
178961	2001 QY_{202}	—	August 23, 2001	Anderson Mesa	LONEOS	·	4.2 km	MPC · JPL
178962	2001 QO_{211}	—	August 23, 2001	Anderson Mesa	LONEOS	·	2.8 km	MPC · JPL
178963	2001 QO_{213}	—	August 23, 2001	Anderson Mesa	LONEOS	·	1.4 km	MPC · JPL
178964	2001 QY_{213}	—	August 23, 2001	Anderson Mesa	LONEOS	·	2.8 km	MPC · JPL
178965	2001 QS_{216}	—	August 23, 2001	Anderson Mesa	LONEOS	·	2.0 km	MPC · JPL
178966	2001 QY_{221}	—	August 24, 2001	Anderson Mesa	LONEOS	·	3.0 km	MPC · JPL
178967	2001 QB_{229}	—	August 24, 2001	Anderson Mesa	LONEOS	·	3.1 km	MPC · JPL
178968	2001 QW_{229}	—	August 24, 2001	Anderson Mesa	LONEOS	·	3.4 km	MPC · JPL
178969	2001 QG_{231}	—	August 24, 2001	Anderson Mesa	LONEOS	·	4.1 km	MPC · JPL
178970	2001 QH_{232}	—	August 24, 2001	Desert Eagle	W. K. Y. Yeung	·	4.8 km	MPC · JPL
178971	2001 QJ_{236}	—	August 24, 2001	Socorro	LINEAR	·	2.4 km	MPC · JPL
178972	2001 QS_{239}	—	August 24, 2001	Socorro	LINEAR	(18466)	2.8 km	MPC · JPL
178973	2001 QL_{245}	—	August 24, 2001	Socorro	LINEAR	·	2.4 km	MPC · JPL
178974	2001 QO_{246}	—	August 24, 2001	Socorro	LINEAR	·	3.2 km	MPC · JPL
178975	2001 QZ_{246}	—	August 24, 2001	Socorro	LINEAR	(5)	2.1 km	MPC · JPL
178976	2001 QA_{248}	—	August 24, 2001	Socorro	LINEAR	·	2.2 km	MPC · JPL
178977	2001 QG_{255}	—	August 25, 2001	Anderson Mesa	LONEOS	·	2.8 km	MPC · JPL
178978	2001 QK_{257}	—	August 25, 2001	Socorro	LINEAR	·	2.6 km	MPC · JPL
178979	2001 QT_{257}	—	August 25, 2001	Socorro	LINEAR	H	870 m	MPC · JPL
178980	2001 QJ_{263}	—	August 25, 2001	Desert Eagle	W. K. Y. Yeung	·	2.7 km	MPC · JPL
178981	2001 QB_{266}	—	August 20, 2001	Socorro	LINEAR	·	2.9 km	MPC · JPL
178982	2001 QY_{268}	—	August 20, 2001	Socorro	LINEAR	·	2.7 km	MPC · JPL
178983	2001 QU_{273}	—	August 19, 2001	Socorro	LINEAR	·	2.0 km	MPC · JPL
178984	2001 QE_{279}	—	August 19, 2001	Socorro	LINEAR	·	2.4 km	MPC · JPL
178985	2001 QA_{288}	—	August 17, 2001	Socorro	LINEAR	H	900 m	MPC · JPL
178986	2001 QO_{292}	—	August 16, 2001	Palomar	NEAT	EUN	2.2 km	MPC · JPL
178987 Jillianredfern	2001 QD_{306}	Jillianredfern	August 19, 2001	Cerro Tololo	M. W. Buie	·	2.1 km	MPC · JPL
178988	2001 QF_{329}	—	August 19, 2001	Cerro Tololo	Deep Ecliptic Survey	AGN	1.5 km	MPC · JPL
178989	2001 QY_{329}	—	August 25, 2001	Socorro	LINEAR	·	3.8 km	MPC · JPL
178990	2001 QZ_{329}	—	August 25, 2001	Anderson Mesa	LONEOS	(18466)	3.8 km	MPC · JPL
178991	2001 QF_{333}	—	August 22, 2001	Socorro	LINEAR	·	4.5 km	MPC · JPL
178992	2001 RM_{2}	—	September 9, 2001	Eskridge	G. Hug	·	1.3 km	MPC · JPL
178993	2001 RS_{2}	—	September 9, 2001	Goodricke-Pigott	R. A. Tucker	·	3.7 km	MPC · JPL
178994	2001 RV_{2}	—	September 9, 2001	Desert Eagle	W. K. Y. Yeung	·	1.6 km	MPC · JPL
178995	2001 RT_{4}	—	September 8, 2001	Socorro	LINEAR	MAR	1.4 km	MPC · JPL
178996	2001 RY_{5}	—	September 8, 2001	Socorro	LINEAR	H	790 m	MPC · JPL
178997	2001 RD_{10}	—	September 10, 2001	Socorro	LINEAR	H	1.0 km	MPC · JPL
178998	2001 RP_{10}	—	September 10, 2001	Socorro	LINEAR	H	910 m	MPC · JPL
178999	2001 RT_{10}	—	September 10, 2001	Goodricke-Pigott	R. A. Tucker	·	2.9 km	MPC · JPL
179000	2001 RY_{13}	—	September 10, 2001	Socorro	LINEAR	·	4.1 km	MPC · JPL

back to top

== See also ==
- Meanings of minor-planet names: 178001–179000
