= Meanings of minor-planet names: 156001–157000 =

As minor planet discoveries are confirmed, they are given a permanent number by the IAU's Minor Planet Center (MPC), and the discoverers can then submit names for them, following the IAU's naming conventions. The list below concerns those minor planets in the specified number-range that have received names, and explains the meanings of those names.

Official naming citations of newly named small Solar System bodies are approved and published in a bulletin by IAU's Working Group for Small Bodies Nomenclature (WGSBN). Before May 2021, citations were published in MPC's Minor Planet Circulars for many decades. Recent citations can also be found on the JPL Small-Body Database (SBDB). Until his death in 2016, German astronomer Lutz D. Schmadel compiled these citations into the Dictionary of Minor Planet Names (DMP) and regularly updated the collection.

Based on Paul Herget's The Names of the Minor Planets, Schmadel also researched the unclear origin of numerous asteroids, most of which had been named prior to World War II. This article incorporates text from this source, which is in the public domain: SBDB New namings may only be added to this list below after official publication as the preannouncement of names is condemned. The WGSBN publishes a comprehensive guideline for the naming rules of non-cometary small Solar System bodies.

== 156001–156100 ==
Named minor planet	Provisional	This minor planet was named for...	Ref · Catalog
There are no named minor planets in this number range

== 156101–156200 ==
back to top

Named minor planet	Provisional	This minor planet was named for...	Ref · Catalog
There are no named minor planets in this number range

== 156201–156300 ==
back to top

Named minor planet	Provisional	This minor planet was named for...	Ref · Catalog
There are no named minor planets in this number range

== 156301–156400 ==
back to top

Named minor planet	Provisional	This minor planet was named for...	Ref · Catalog
There are no named minor planets in this number range

== 156401–156500 ==
back to top

Named minor planet	Provisional	This minor planet was named for...	Ref · Catalog
There are no named minor planets in this number range

== 156501–156600 ==
back to top

Named minor planet	Provisional	This minor planet was named for...	Ref · Catalog
156542 Hogg	2002 CM_{314}	David W. Hogg (born 1970), American astronomer with the Sloan Digital Sky Survey	JPL · 156542
156580 Madách	2002 EF_{157}	Imre Madách (1823–1864), a Hungarian poet, writer, lawyer, and corresponding member of the Hungarian Academy of Sciences.	IAU · 156580

== 156601–156700 ==
back to top

Named minor planet	Provisional	This minor planet was named for...	Ref · Catalog
156631 Margitan	2002 JM_{8}	James Margitan (born 1951), atmospheric researcher and manager at JPL's Science Division	JPL · 156631

== 156701–156800 ==
back to top

Named minor planet	Provisional	This minor planet was named for...	Ref · Catalog
156751 Chelseaferrell	2002 XL_{92}	Chelsea L. Ferrell (born 1988), of the Southwest Research Institute, was a resource analyst working for the New Horizons mission to Pluto.	JPL · 156751

== 156801–156900 ==
back to top

Named minor planet	Provisional	This minor planet was named for...	Ref · Catalog
156879 Eloïs	2003 EQ_{1}	Eloïs Hernandez (born 2007), son of Michel Hernandez, a French astronomer at the Observatory of Saint-Veran where this minor planet was discovered	JPL · 156879
156880 Bernardtregon	2003 ES_{1}	Bernard Tregon (born 1968), French amateur astronomer, interferometry specialist, and observer at the Pic du Midi Observatory	JPL · 156880

== 156901–157000 ==
back to top

Named minor planet	Provisional	This minor planet was named for...	Ref · Catalog
156939 Odegard	2003 FB_{120}	John D. Odegard (1941–1998) was an American aviation visionary who started the flight-training program at the University of North Dakota in 1968 that is now known as the John D. Odegard School of Aerospace Sciences.	JPL · 156939
156990 Claerbout	2003 KX_{18}	Jon Claerbout (born 1938), American geophysicist and contributor to the theory and art of seismic exploration. He is a pioneer of computer-modelling wave propagation and of seismic interferometry, examining the structure of the Earth and the Sun.	JPL · 156990

back to top

Preceded by 155,001–156,000	Meanings of minor-planet names List of minor planets: 156,001–157,000	Succeeded by 157,001–158,000
