= List of minor planets: 156001–157000 =

The following is a partial list of minor planets, running from minor-planet number 156001 through 157000, inclusive. The primary data for this and other partial lists is based on JPL's "Small-Body Orbital Elements" and data available from the Minor Planet Center. Critical list information is also provided by the MPC, unless otherwise specified from Lowell Observatory. A detailed description of the table's columns and additional sources are given on the main page including a complete list of every page in this series, and a statistical break-up on the dynamical classification of minor planets.

Also see the summary list of all named bodies in numerical and alphabetical order, and the corresponding naming citations for the number range of this particular list. New namings may only be added to this list after official publication, as the preannouncement of names is condemned by the Working Group for Small Bodies Nomenclature of the International Astronomical Union.

| Near-Earth obj. | MBA (inner) | MBA (outer) | Centaur |
| Mars-crosser | MBA (middle) | Jupiter trojan | Trans-Neptunian obj. |
| Unclassified |

== 156001–156100 ==
| Designation | | | Discovery | | | Properties | | Ref |
| Permanent | Provisional | Named after | Date | Site | Discoverer(s) | Category | Diam. | Ref |
|---|---|---|---|---|---|---|---|---|
| 156001 | 2001 RC_{30} | — | September 7, 2001 | Socorro | LINEAR | NYS | 1.8 km | MPC · JPL |
| 156002 | 2001 RG_{31} | — | September 7, 2001 | Socorro | LINEAR | NYS | 1.7 km | MPC · JPL |
| 156003 | 2001 RO_{35} | — | September 8, 2001 | Socorro | LINEAR | · | 1.2 km | MPC · JPL |
| 156004 | 2001 RL_{41} | — | September 11, 2001 | Socorro | LINEAR | V | 940 m | MPC · JPL |
| 156005 | 2001 RD_{45} | — | September 12, 2001 | Palomar | NEAT | · | 2.0 km | MPC · JPL |
| 156006 | 2001 RJ_{45} | — | September 14, 2001 | Palomar | NEAT | · | 1.5 km | MPC · JPL |
| 156007 | 2001 RN_{49} | — | September 10, 2001 | Socorro | LINEAR | · | 1.4 km | MPC · JPL |
| 156008 | 2001 RZ_{49} | — | September 10, 2001 | Socorro | LINEAR | · | 1.2 km | MPC · JPL |
| 156009 | 2001 RG_{55} | — | September 12, 2001 | Socorro | LINEAR | · | 1.7 km | MPC · JPL |
| 156010 | 2001 RQ_{75} | — | September 10, 2001 | Socorro | LINEAR | · | 2.7 km | MPC · JPL |
| 156011 | 2001 RE_{78} | — | September 10, 2001 | Socorro | LINEAR | · | 2.5 km | MPC · JPL |
| 156012 | 2001 RV_{78} | — | September 10, 2001 | Socorro | LINEAR | · | 1.6 km | MPC · JPL |
| 156013 | 2001 RW_{78} | — | September 10, 2001 | Socorro | LINEAR | · | 4.3 km | MPC · JPL |
| 156014 | 2001 RR_{80} | — | September 14, 2001 | Palomar | NEAT | · | 1.5 km | MPC · JPL |
| 156015 | 2001 RX_{81} | — | September 14, 2001 | Palomar | NEAT | · | 2.0 km | MPC · JPL |
| 156016 | 2001 RW_{86} | — | September 11, 2001 | Anderson Mesa | LONEOS | · | 2.2 km | MPC · JPL |
| 156017 | 2001 RY_{91} | — | September 11, 2001 | Anderson Mesa | LONEOS | · | 1.8 km | MPC · JPL |
| 156018 | 2001 RM_{94} | — | September 11, 2001 | Anderson Mesa | LONEOS | fast | 2.1 km | MPC · JPL |
| 156019 | 2001 RT_{94} | — | September 11, 2001 | Anderson Mesa | LONEOS | · | 1.5 km | MPC · JPL |
| 156020 | 2001 RD_{101} | — | September 12, 2001 | Socorro | LINEAR | · | 2.3 km | MPC · JPL |
| 156021 | 2001 RN_{101} | — | September 12, 2001 | Socorro | LINEAR | · | 1.6 km | MPC · JPL |
| 156022 | 2001 RV_{101} | — | September 12, 2001 | Socorro | LINEAR | · | 1.2 km | MPC · JPL |
| 156023 | 2001 RD_{106} | — | September 12, 2001 | Socorro | LINEAR | · | 1.7 km | MPC · JPL |
| 156024 | 2001 RN_{114} | — | September 12, 2001 | Socorro | LINEAR | · | 2.1 km | MPC · JPL |
| 156025 | 2001 RD_{115} | — | September 12, 2001 | Socorro | LINEAR | NYS | 1.9 km | MPC · JPL |
| 156026 | 2001 RO_{122} | — | September 12, 2001 | Socorro | LINEAR | · | 1.5 km | MPC · JPL |
| 156027 | 2001 RJ_{126} | — | September 12, 2001 | Socorro | LINEAR | · | 1.8 km | MPC · JPL |
| 156028 | 2001 RT_{127} | — | September 12, 2001 | Socorro | LINEAR | MAS | 1.3 km | MPC · JPL |
| 156029 | 2001 RK_{128} | — | September 12, 2001 | Socorro | LINEAR | · | 1.9 km | MPC · JPL |
| 156030 | 2001 RK_{130} | — | September 12, 2001 | Socorro | LINEAR | · | 1.7 km | MPC · JPL |
| 156031 | 2001 RX_{139} | — | September 12, 2001 | Socorro | LINEAR | · | 1.5 km | MPC · JPL |
| 156032 | 2001 RP_{142} | — | September 10, 2001 | Palomar | NEAT | · | 2.0 km | MPC · JPL |
| 156033 | 2001 RR_{147} | — | September 10, 2001 | Palomar | NEAT | · | 2.0 km | MPC · JPL |
| 156034 | 2001 RZ_{151} | — | September 11, 2001 | Anderson Mesa | LONEOS | · | 1.9 km | MPC · JPL |
| 156035 | 2001 RU_{154} | — | September 11, 2001 | Kitt Peak | Spacewatch | · | 1.8 km | MPC · JPL |
| 156036 | 2001 SD | — | September 16, 2001 | Emerald Lane | L. Ball | · | 1.8 km | MPC · JPL |
| 156037 | 2001 SQ | — | September 16, 2001 | Fountain Hills | C. W. Juels, P. R. Holvorcem | · | 2.7 km | MPC · JPL |
| 156038 | 2001 SK_{1} | — | September 17, 2001 | Desert Eagle | W. K. Y. Yeung | CLA | 2.9 km | MPC · JPL |
| 156039 | 2001 SR_{4} | — | September 18, 2001 | Goodricke-Pigott | R. A. Tucker | NYS | 2.1 km | MPC · JPL |
| 156040 | 2001 SQ_{6} | — | September 18, 2001 | Kitt Peak | Spacewatch | · | 1.6 km | MPC · JPL |
| 156041 | 2001 SM_{10} | — | September 18, 2001 | Desert Eagle | W. K. Y. Yeung | · | 2.6 km | MPC · JPL |
| 156042 | 2001 SB_{12} | — | September 16, 2001 | Socorro | LINEAR | · | 1.7 km | MPC · JPL |
| 156043 | 2001 SC_{13} | — | September 16, 2001 | Socorro | LINEAR | · | 2.6 km | MPC · JPL |
| 156044 | 2001 SA_{15} | — | September 16, 2001 | Socorro | LINEAR | 3:2 | 9.7 km | MPC · JPL |
| 156045 | 2001 SE_{15} | — | September 16, 2001 | Socorro | LINEAR | · | 1.9 km | MPC · JPL |
| 156046 | 2001 ST_{30} | — | September 16, 2001 | Socorro | LINEAR | V | 1.2 km | MPC · JPL |
| 156047 | 2001 SG_{31} | — | September 16, 2001 | Socorro | LINEAR | · | 1.7 km | MPC · JPL |
| 156048 | 2001 SN_{32} | — | September 16, 2001 | Socorro | LINEAR | · | 1.9 km | MPC · JPL |
| 156049 | 2001 SR_{37} | — | September 16, 2001 | Socorro | LINEAR | · | 1.4 km | MPC · JPL |
| 156050 | 2001 SX_{40} | — | September 16, 2001 | Socorro | LINEAR | · | 2.4 km | MPC · JPL |
| 156051 | 2001 SL_{46} | — | September 16, 2001 | Socorro | LINEAR | V | 1.3 km | MPC · JPL |
| 156052 | 2001 SO_{46} | — | September 16, 2001 | Socorro | LINEAR | · | 1.9 km | MPC · JPL |
| 156053 | 2001 SU_{47} | — | September 16, 2001 | Socorro | LINEAR | V | 1.2 km | MPC · JPL |
| 156054 | 2001 SO_{51} | — | September 16, 2001 | Socorro | LINEAR | · | 2.2 km | MPC · JPL |
| 156055 | 2001 SN_{52} | — | September 16, 2001 | Socorro | LINEAR | · | 1.6 km | MPC · JPL |
| 156056 | 2001 SN_{56} | — | September 16, 2001 | Socorro | LINEAR | · | 1.8 km | MPC · JPL |
| 156057 | 2001 SV_{56} | — | September 16, 2001 | Socorro | LINEAR | · | 2.0 km | MPC · JPL |
| 156058 | 2001 SA_{57} | — | September 16, 2001 | Socorro | LINEAR | PHO | 1.6 km | MPC · JPL |
| 156059 | 2001 SP_{57} | — | September 17, 2001 | Socorro | LINEAR | · | 1.4 km | MPC · JPL |
| 156060 | 2001 SY_{57} | — | September 17, 2001 | Socorro | LINEAR | · | 2.0 km | MPC · JPL |
| 156061 | 2001 SB_{59} | — | September 17, 2001 | Socorro | LINEAR | V | 1.4 km | MPC · JPL |
| 156062 | 2001 SK_{61} | — | September 17, 2001 | Socorro | LINEAR | · | 1.9 km | MPC · JPL |
| 156063 | 2001 SQ_{61} | — | September 17, 2001 | Socorro | LINEAR | V | 960 m | MPC · JPL |
| 156064 | 2001 SP_{66} | — | September 17, 2001 | Socorro | LINEAR | · | 1.6 km | MPC · JPL |
| 156065 | 2001 SE_{67} | — | September 17, 2001 | Socorro | LINEAR | slow | 1.5 km | MPC · JPL |
| 156066 | 2001 SR_{73} | — | September 19, 2001 | Bisei SG Center | BATTeRS | · | 3.0 km | MPC · JPL |
| 156067 | 2001 SJ_{79} | — | September 20, 2001 | Socorro | LINEAR | · | 1.4 km | MPC · JPL |
| 156068 | 2001 ST_{82} | — | September 20, 2001 | Socorro | LINEAR | · | 1.1 km | MPC · JPL |
| 156069 | 2001 SM_{86} | — | September 20, 2001 | Socorro | LINEAR | · | 1.2 km | MPC · JPL |
| 156070 | 2001 SG_{95} | — | September 20, 2001 | Socorro | LINEAR | · | 1.3 km | MPC · JPL |
| 156071 | 2001 SL_{105} | — | September 20, 2001 | Socorro | LINEAR | · | 1.7 km | MPC · JPL |
| 156072 | 2001 SF_{113} | — | September 18, 2001 | Desert Eagle | W. K. Y. Yeung | · | 4.7 km | MPC · JPL |
| 156073 | 2001 SF_{118} | — | September 16, 2001 | Socorro | LINEAR | · | 1.5 km | MPC · JPL |
| 156074 | 2001 SE_{125} | — | September 16, 2001 | Socorro | LINEAR | CLA | 3.7 km | MPC · JPL |
| 156075 | 2001 SY_{137} | — | September 16, 2001 | Socorro | LINEAR | · | 1.8 km | MPC · JPL |
| 156076 | 2001 SJ_{140} | — | September 16, 2001 | Socorro | LINEAR | · | 2.0 km | MPC · JPL |
| 156077 | 2001 SU_{140} | — | September 16, 2001 | Socorro | LINEAR | · | 1.6 km | MPC · JPL |
| 156078 | 2001 SU_{150} | — | September 17, 2001 | Socorro | LINEAR | · | 2.4 km | MPC · JPL |
| 156079 | 2001 SH_{151} | — | September 17, 2001 | Socorro | LINEAR | · | 1.8 km | MPC · JPL |
| 156080 | 2001 SJ_{155} | — | September 17, 2001 | Socorro | LINEAR | PHO | 1.2 km | MPC · JPL |
| 156081 | 2001 SB_{163} | — | September 17, 2001 | Socorro | LINEAR | · | 2.4 km | MPC · JPL |
| 156082 | 2001 ST_{166} | — | September 19, 2001 | Socorro | LINEAR | V | 900 m | MPC · JPL |
| 156083 | 2001 SG_{167} | — | September 19, 2001 | Socorro | LINEAR | · | 2.1 km | MPC · JPL |
| 156084 | 2001 SD_{180} | — | September 19, 2001 | Socorro | LINEAR | · | 1.8 km | MPC · JPL |
| 156085 | 2001 SE_{182} | — | September 19, 2001 | Socorro | LINEAR | 3:2 | 8.4 km | MPC · JPL |
| 156086 | 2001 SX_{183} | — | September 19, 2001 | Socorro | LINEAR | NYS | 1.4 km | MPC · JPL |
| 156087 | 2001 SO_{185} | — | September 19, 2001 | Socorro | LINEAR | NYS | 2.0 km | MPC · JPL |
| 156088 | 2001 SJ_{193} | — | September 19, 2001 | Socorro | LINEAR | NYS | 1.3 km | MPC · JPL |
| 156089 | 2001 SK_{194} | — | September 19, 2001 | Socorro | LINEAR | · | 1.7 km | MPC · JPL |
| 156090 | 2001 SF_{195} | — | September 19, 2001 | Socorro | LINEAR | MAS | 1.6 km | MPC · JPL |
| 156091 | 2001 SF_{205} | — | September 19, 2001 | Socorro | LINEAR | V | 1.0 km | MPC · JPL |
| 156092 | 2001 SQ_{207} | — | September 19, 2001 | Socorro | LINEAR | · | 1.2 km | MPC · JPL |
| 156093 | 2001 SH_{209} | — | September 19, 2001 | Socorro | LINEAR | · | 1.6 km | MPC · JPL |
| 156094 | 2001 SB_{213} | — | September 19, 2001 | Socorro | LINEAR | · | 930 m | MPC · JPL |
| 156095 | 2001 SE_{213} | — | September 19, 2001 | Socorro | LINEAR | · | 1.7 km | MPC · JPL |
| 156096 | 2001 SZ_{213} | — | September 19, 2001 | Socorro | LINEAR | · | 1.6 km | MPC · JPL |
| 156097 | 2001 SF_{217} | — | September 19, 2001 | Socorro | LINEAR | · | 2.3 km | MPC · JPL |
| 156098 | 2001 SR_{228} | — | September 19, 2001 | Socorro | LINEAR | L5 | 10 km | MPC · JPL |
| 156099 | 2001 SN_{231} | — | September 19, 2001 | Socorro | LINEAR | · | 1.6 km | MPC · JPL |
| 156100 | 2001 SA_{233} | — | September 19, 2001 | Socorro | LINEAR | · | 2.6 km | MPC · JPL |

== 156101–156200 ==
back to top

| Designation | | | Discovery | | | Properties | | Ref |
| Permanent | Provisional | Named after | Date | Site | Discoverer(s) | Category | Diam. | Ref |
|---|---|---|---|---|---|---|---|---|
| 156101 | 2001 SL_{234} | — | September 19, 2001 | Socorro | LINEAR | · | 1.4 km | MPC · JPL |
| 156102 | 2001 SH_{237} | — | September 19, 2001 | Socorro | LINEAR | MAS | 1.2 km | MPC · JPL |
| 156103 | 2001 SL_{238} | — | September 19, 2001 | Socorro | LINEAR | NYS | 2.1 km | MPC · JPL |
| 156104 | 2001 SQ_{240} | — | September 19, 2001 | Socorro | LINEAR | · | 2.2 km | MPC · JPL |
| 156105 | 2001 SK_{242} | — | September 19, 2001 | Socorro | LINEAR | · | 1.4 km | MPC · JPL |
| 156106 | 2001 SA_{244} | — | September 19, 2001 | Socorro | LINEAR | · | 1.2 km | MPC · JPL |
| 156107 | 2001 SL_{247} | — | September 19, 2001 | Socorro | LINEAR | · | 1.9 km | MPC · JPL |
| 156108 | 2001 SS_{247} | — | September 19, 2001 | Socorro | LINEAR | · | 1.7 km | MPC · JPL |
| 156109 | 2001 SP_{248} | — | September 19, 2001 | Socorro | LINEAR | · | 2.0 km | MPC · JPL |
| 156110 | 2001 SY_{249} | — | September 19, 2001 | Socorro | LINEAR | V | 1.4 km | MPC · JPL |
| 156111 | 2001 SY_{253} | — | September 19, 2001 | Socorro | LINEAR | · | 1.1 km | MPC · JPL |
| 156112 | 2001 SO_{254} | — | September 19, 2001 | Socorro | LINEAR | · | 3.4 km | MPC · JPL |
| 156113 | 2001 SY_{266} | — | September 25, 2001 | Desert Eagle | W. K. Y. Yeung | · | 1.9 km | MPC · JPL |
| 156114 | 2001 ST_{267} | — | September 25, 2001 | Desert Eagle | W. K. Y. Yeung | (5) | 2.2 km | MPC · JPL |
| 156115 | 2001 SQ_{275} | — | September 21, 2001 | Kitt Peak | Spacewatch | · | 920 m | MPC · JPL |
| 156116 | 2001 SC_{281} | — | September 21, 2001 | Anderson Mesa | LONEOS | · | 2.0 km | MPC · JPL |
| 156117 | 2001 SU_{288} | — | September 28, 2001 | Palomar | NEAT | · | 1.7 km | MPC · JPL |
| 156118 | 2001 SO_{295} | — | September 20, 2001 | Socorro | LINEAR | · | 1.8 km | MPC · JPL |
| 156119 | 2001 SU_{296} | — | September 20, 2001 | Socorro | LINEAR | · | 1.6 km | MPC · JPL |
| 156120 | 2001 SQ_{302} | — | September 20, 2001 | Socorro | LINEAR | · | 1.9 km | MPC · JPL |
| 156121 | 2001 SZ_{311} | — | September 20, 2001 | Socorro | LINEAR | NYS · | 3.2 km | MPC · JPL |
| 156122 | 2001 SW_{327} | — | September 18, 2001 | Anderson Mesa | LONEOS | · | 1.7 km | MPC · JPL |
| 156123 | 2001 SV_{337} | — | September 20, 2001 | Socorro | LINEAR | L5 | 10 km | MPC · JPL |
| 156124 | 2001 SR_{344} | — | September 23, 2001 | Palomar | NEAT | · | 1.4 km | MPC · JPL |
| 156125 | 2001 SH_{347} | — | September 25, 2001 | Socorro | LINEAR | L5 | 18 km | MPC · JPL |
| 156126 | 2001 SB_{350} | — | September 20, 2001 | Kitt Peak | Spacewatch | · | 1.6 km | MPC · JPL |
| 156127 | 2001 TR_{1} | — | October 11, 2001 | Desert Eagle | W. K. Y. Yeung | (5) | 1.6 km | MPC · JPL |
| 156128 | 2001 TA_{4} | — | October 7, 2001 | Palomar | NEAT | · | 1.6 km | MPC · JPL |
| 156129 | 2001 TY_{5} | — | October 10, 2001 | Palomar | NEAT | · | 3.1 km | MPC · JPL |
| 156130 | 2001 TC_{10} | — | October 13, 2001 | Socorro | LINEAR | NYS | 2.0 km | MPC · JPL |
| 156131 | 2001 TB_{15} | — | October 10, 2001 | Palomar | NEAT | · | 2.4 km | MPC · JPL |
| 156132 | 2001 TC_{15} | — | October 10, 2001 | Palomar | NEAT | V | 1.3 km | MPC · JPL |
| 156133 | 2001 TV_{23} | — | October 14, 2001 | Socorro | LINEAR | · | 1.7 km | MPC · JPL |
| 156134 | 2001 TC_{27} | — | October 14, 2001 | Socorro | LINEAR | · | 2.5 km | MPC · JPL |
| 156135 | 2001 TD_{38} | — | October 14, 2001 | Socorro | LINEAR | EUN | 2.3 km | MPC · JPL |
| 156136 | 2001 TY_{38} | — | October 14, 2001 | Socorro | LINEAR | V | 1.5 km | MPC · JPL |
| 156137 | 2001 TM_{39} | — | October 14, 2001 | Socorro | LINEAR | · | 2.1 km | MPC · JPL |
| 156138 | 2001 TU_{41} | — | October 14, 2001 | Socorro | LINEAR | · | 2.6 km | MPC · JPL |
| 156139 | 2001 TS_{42} | — | October 14, 2001 | Socorro | LINEAR | · | 3.4 km | MPC · JPL |
| 156140 | 2001 TP_{44} | — | October 14, 2001 | Socorro | LINEAR | · | 2.4 km | MPC · JPL |
| 156141 | 2001 TP_{53} | — | October 13, 2001 | Socorro | LINEAR | V | 870 m | MPC · JPL |
| 156142 | 2001 TB_{61} | — | October 13, 2001 | Socorro | LINEAR | MAS | 1.3 km | MPC · JPL |
| 156143 | 2001 TN_{61} | — | October 13, 2001 | Socorro | LINEAR | · | 2.3 km | MPC · JPL |
| 156144 | 2001 TP_{61} | — | October 13, 2001 | Socorro | LINEAR | NYS | 2.6 km | MPC · JPL |
| 156145 | 2001 TH_{62} | — | October 13, 2001 | Socorro | LINEAR | NYS | 1.5 km | MPC · JPL |
| 156146 | 2001 TB_{66} | — | October 13, 2001 | Socorro | LINEAR | · | 2.4 km | MPC · JPL |
| 156147 | 2001 TC_{71} | — | October 13, 2001 | Socorro | LINEAR | · | 3.0 km | MPC · JPL |
| 156148 | 2001 TL_{71} | — | October 13, 2001 | Socorro | LINEAR | · | 2.1 km | MPC · JPL |
| 156149 | 2001 TP_{72} | — | October 13, 2001 | Socorro | LINEAR | · | 1.9 km | MPC · JPL |
| 156150 | 2001 TN_{73} | — | October 13, 2001 | Socorro | LINEAR | ERI | 2.7 km | MPC · JPL |
| 156151 | 2001 TL_{74} | — | October 13, 2001 | Socorro | LINEAR | · | 1.8 km | MPC · JPL |
| 156152 | 2001 TN_{75} | — | October 13, 2001 | Socorro | LINEAR | · | 1.8 km | MPC · JPL |
| 156153 | 2001 TM_{78} | — | October 13, 2001 | Socorro | LINEAR | · | 3.7 km | MPC · JPL |
| 156154 | 2001 TF_{95} | — | October 14, 2001 | Socorro | LINEAR | · | 1.9 km | MPC · JPL |
| 156155 | 2001 TH_{95} | — | October 14, 2001 | Socorro | LINEAR | · | 1.8 km | MPC · JPL |
| 156156 | 2001 TM_{95} | — | October 14, 2001 | Socorro | LINEAR | · | 2.6 km | MPC · JPL |
| 156157 | 2001 TY_{99} | — | October 14, 2001 | Socorro | LINEAR | · | 1.5 km | MPC · JPL |
| 156158 | 2001 TB_{101} | — | October 14, 2001 | Socorro | LINEAR | · | 1.4 km | MPC · JPL |
| 156159 | 2001 TK_{104} | — | October 15, 2001 | Desert Eagle | W. K. Y. Yeung | · | 2.2 km | MPC · JPL |
| 156160 | 2001 TY_{104} | — | October 13, 2001 | Socorro | LINEAR | V | 1.0 km | MPC · JPL |
| 156161 | 2001 TZ_{111} | — | October 14, 2001 | Socorro | LINEAR | · | 1.4 km | MPC · JPL |
| 156162 | 2001 TB_{112} | — | October 14, 2001 | Socorro | LINEAR | · | 2.1 km | MPC · JPL |
| 156163 | 2001 TF_{112} | — | October 14, 2001 | Socorro | LINEAR | · | 1.9 km | MPC · JPL |
| 156164 | 2001 TC_{116} | — | October 14, 2001 | Socorro | LINEAR | · | 2.6 km | MPC · JPL |
| 156165 | 2001 TG_{132} | — | October 11, 2001 | Palomar | NEAT | · | 5.4 km | MPC · JPL |
| 156166 | 2001 TG_{134} | — | October 12, 2001 | Haleakala | NEAT | V | 1.2 km | MPC · JPL |
| 156167 | 2001 TA_{135} | — | October 13, 2001 | Palomar | NEAT | · | 1.9 km | MPC · JPL |
| 156168 | 2001 TO_{144} | — | October 10, 2001 | Palomar | NEAT | V | 1.2 km | MPC · JPL |
| 156169 | 2001 TR_{149} | — | October 10, 2001 | Palomar | NEAT | · | 2.3 km | MPC · JPL |
| 156170 | 2001 TH_{150} | — | October 10, 2001 | Palomar | NEAT | · | 1.3 km | MPC · JPL |
| 156171 | 2001 TX_{150} | — | October 10, 2001 | Palomar | NEAT | · | 2.4 km | MPC · JPL |
| 156172 | 2001 TG_{159} | — | October 11, 2001 | Palomar | NEAT | MAS | 810 m | MPC · JPL |
| 156173 | 2001 TR_{162} | — | October 11, 2001 | Palomar | NEAT | (5) | 1.3 km | MPC · JPL |
| 156174 | 2001 TO_{164} | — | October 11, 2001 | Palomar | NEAT | · | 2.4 km | MPC · JPL |
| 156175 | 2001 TH_{174} | — | October 14, 2001 | Socorro | LINEAR | · | 1.1 km | MPC · JPL |
| 156176 | 2001 TX_{180} | — | October 14, 2001 | Socorro | LINEAR | · | 1.4 km | MPC · JPL |
| 156177 | 2001 TF_{181} | — | October 14, 2001 | Socorro | LINEAR | · | 1.9 km | MPC · JPL |
| 156178 | 2001 TM_{181} | — | October 14, 2001 | Socorro | LINEAR | · | 3.6 km | MPC · JPL |
| 156179 | 2001 TR_{187} | — | October 14, 2001 | Socorro | LINEAR | · | 2.0 km | MPC · JPL |
| 156180 | 2001 TP_{195} | — | October 15, 2001 | Palomar | NEAT | · | 1.3 km | MPC · JPL |
| 156181 | 2001 TK_{204} | — | October 11, 2001 | Socorro | LINEAR | V | 1.1 km | MPC · JPL |
| 156182 | 2001 TE_{219} | — | October 14, 2001 | Anderson Mesa | LONEOS | V | 1.2 km | MPC · JPL |
| 156183 | 2001 TN_{219} | — | October 14, 2001 | Socorro | LINEAR | · | 1.8 km | MPC · JPL |
| 156184 | 2001 TX_{219} | — | October 14, 2001 | Socorro | LINEAR | (2076) | 1.2 km | MPC · JPL |
| 156185 | 2001 TH_{220} | — | October 14, 2001 | Socorro | LINEAR | L5 | 19 km | MPC · JPL |
| 156186 | 2001 TE_{222} | — | October 14, 2001 | Socorro | LINEAR | · | 1.4 km | MPC · JPL |
| 156187 | 2001 TJ_{233} | — | October 15, 2001 | Palomar | NEAT | · | 1.8 km | MPC · JPL |
| 156188 | 2001 TV_{233} | — | October 15, 2001 | Kitt Peak | Spacewatch | L5 | 15 km | MPC · JPL |
| 156189 | 2001 TQ_{236} | — | October 7, 2001 | Palomar | NEAT | · | 1.4 km | MPC · JPL |
| 156190 | 2001 TY_{236} | — | October 8, 2001 | Palomar | NEAT | · | 2.1 km | MPC · JPL |
| 156191 | 2001 TJ_{256} | — | October 10, 2001 | Palomar | NEAT | · | 1.3 km | MPC · JPL |
| 156192 | 2001 UJ_{5} | — | October 17, 2001 | Desert Eagle | W. K. Y. Yeung | BAR | 2.1 km | MPC · JPL |
| 156193 | 2001 UC_{6} | — | October 20, 2001 | Socorro | LINEAR | · | 1.0 km | MPC · JPL |
| 156194 | 2001 UM_{6} | — | October 17, 2001 | Desert Eagle | W. K. Y. Yeung | · | 1.1 km | MPC · JPL |
| 156195 | 2001 UW_{6} | — | October 18, 2001 | Desert Eagle | W. K. Y. Yeung | · | 1.7 km | MPC · JPL |
| 156196 | 2001 UZ_{11} | — | October 23, 2001 | Desert Eagle | W. K. Y. Yeung | · | 2.2 km | MPC · JPL |
| 156197 | 2001 UV_{23} | — | October 18, 2001 | Socorro | LINEAR | BAR | 1.9 km | MPC · JPL |
| 156198 | 2001 UP_{29} | — | October 16, 2001 | Socorro | LINEAR | · | 1.0 km | MPC · JPL |
| 156199 | 2001 UA_{35} | — | October 16, 2001 | Socorro | LINEAR | V | 1.3 km | MPC · JPL |
| 156200 | 2001 UB_{39} | — | October 17, 2001 | Socorro | LINEAR | NYS | 1.8 km | MPC · JPL |

== 156201–156300 ==
back to top

| Designation | | | Discovery | | | Properties | | Ref |
| Permanent | Provisional | Named after | Date | Site | Discoverer(s) | Category | Diam. | Ref |
|---|---|---|---|---|---|---|---|---|
| 156201 | 2001 UJ_{39} | — | October 17, 2001 | Socorro | LINEAR | V | 1.1 km | MPC · JPL |
| 156202 | 2001 UJ_{41} | — | October 17, 2001 | Socorro | LINEAR | NYS | 1.3 km | MPC · JPL |
| 156203 | 2001 UQ_{43} | — | October 17, 2001 | Socorro | LINEAR | · | 2.1 km | MPC · JPL |
| 156204 | 2001 UA_{46} | — | October 17, 2001 | Socorro | LINEAR | (5) | 2.3 km | MPC · JPL |
| 156205 | 2001 UK_{46} | — | October 17, 2001 | Socorro | LINEAR | · | 1.3 km | MPC · JPL |
| 156206 | 2001 UH_{49} | — | October 17, 2001 | Socorro | LINEAR | · | 2.5 km | MPC · JPL |
| 156207 | 2001 UD_{50} | — | October 17, 2001 | Socorro | LINEAR | · | 1.3 km | MPC · JPL |
| 156208 | 2001 UJ_{52} | — | October 17, 2001 | Socorro | LINEAR | NYS | 1.9 km | MPC · JPL |
| 156209 | 2001 UG_{54} | — | October 18, 2001 | Socorro | LINEAR | · | 1.1 km | MPC · JPL |
| 156210 | 2001 UH_{57} | — | October 17, 2001 | Socorro | LINEAR | L5 | 18 km | MPC · JPL |
| 156211 | 2001 UR_{59} | — | October 17, 2001 | Socorro | LINEAR | V | 1.1 km | MPC · JPL |
| 156212 | 2001 UB_{62} | — | October 17, 2001 | Socorro | LINEAR | · | 1.5 km | MPC · JPL |
| 156213 | 2001 UH_{63} | — | October 17, 2001 | Socorro | LINEAR | · | 1.1 km | MPC · JPL |
| 156214 | 2001 UO_{66} | — | October 18, 2001 | Socorro | LINEAR | · | 4.3 km | MPC · JPL |
| 156215 | 2001 UK_{72} | — | October 20, 2001 | Haleakala | NEAT | slow | 1.9 km | MPC · JPL |
| 156216 | 2001 UX_{73} | — | October 17, 2001 | Socorro | LINEAR | (5) | 2.0 km | MPC · JPL |
| 156217 | 2001 US_{74} | — | October 17, 2001 | Socorro | LINEAR | · | 1.2 km | MPC · JPL |
| 156218 | 2001 UK_{75} | — | October 17, 2001 | Socorro | LINEAR | · | 1.6 km | MPC · JPL |
| 156219 | 2001 UP_{75} | — | October 17, 2001 | Socorro | LINEAR | · | 1.8 km | MPC · JPL |
| 156220 | 2001 UJ_{76} | — | October 17, 2001 | Socorro | LINEAR | V | 1.1 km | MPC · JPL |
| 156221 | 2001 UE_{81} | — | October 20, 2001 | Socorro | LINEAR | · | 2.4 km | MPC · JPL |
| 156222 | 2001 UB_{91} | — | October 23, 2001 | Kitt Peak | Spacewatch | L5 | 10 km | MPC · JPL |
| 156223 | 2001 UK_{94} | — | October 19, 2001 | Palomar | NEAT | · | 1.2 km | MPC · JPL |
| 156224 | 2001 UK_{96} | — | October 17, 2001 | Socorro | LINEAR | · | 2.0 km | MPC · JPL |
| 156225 | 2001 UB_{99} | — | October 17, 2001 | Socorro | LINEAR | · | 2.2 km | MPC · JPL |
| 156226 | 2001 UY_{99} | — | October 17, 2001 | Socorro | LINEAR | NYS | 1.7 km | MPC · JPL |
| 156227 | 2001 UU_{107} | — | October 20, 2001 | Socorro | LINEAR | V | 1.1 km | MPC · JPL |
| 156228 | 2001 UJ_{118} | — | October 22, 2001 | Socorro | LINEAR | · | 2.2 km | MPC · JPL |
| 156229 | 2001 UY_{118} | — | October 22, 2001 | Socorro | LINEAR | · | 2.2 km | MPC · JPL |
| 156230 | 2001 UE_{119} | — | October 22, 2001 | Socorro | LINEAR | · | 2.1 km | MPC · JPL |
| 156231 | 2001 UC_{123} | — | October 22, 2001 | Socorro | LINEAR | · | 2.3 km | MPC · JPL |
| 156232 | 2001 UC_{128} | — | October 17, 2001 | Socorro | LINEAR | · | 4.8 km | MPC · JPL |
| 156233 | 2001 UY_{131} | — | October 20, 2001 | Socorro | LINEAR | · | 2.0 km | MPC · JPL |
| 156234 | 2001 UJ_{140} | — | October 23, 2001 | Socorro | LINEAR | · | 1.7 km | MPC · JPL |
| 156235 | 2001 UJ_{145} | — | October 23, 2001 | Socorro | LINEAR | · | 1.8 km | MPC · JPL |
| 156236 | 2001 UM_{145} | — | October 23, 2001 | Socorro | LINEAR | · | 1.8 km | MPC · JPL |
| 156237 | 2001 UH_{146} | — | October 23, 2001 | Socorro | LINEAR | L5 | 11 km | MPC · JPL |
| 156238 | 2001 UL_{151} | — | October 23, 2001 | Socorro | LINEAR | NYS | 1.6 km | MPC · JPL |
| 156239 | 2001 UC_{153} | — | October 23, 2001 | Socorro | LINEAR | NYS | 1.9 km | MPC · JPL |
| 156240 | 2001 UO_{155} | — | October 23, 2001 | Socorro | LINEAR | · | 1.4 km | MPC · JPL |
| 156241 | 2001 UX_{156} | — | October 23, 2001 | Socorro | LINEAR | · | 1.8 km | MPC · JPL |
| 156242 | 2001 UD_{162} | — | October 23, 2001 | Socorro | LINEAR | · | 3.5 km | MPC · JPL |
| 156243 | 2001 UL_{163} | — | October 23, 2001 | Socorro | LINEAR | · | 2.1 km | MPC · JPL |
| 156244 | 2001 UX_{169} | — | October 21, 2001 | Socorro | LINEAR | · | 1.7 km | MPC · JPL |
| 156245 | 2001 UF_{174} | — | October 18, 2001 | Palomar | NEAT | · | 2.7 km | MPC · JPL |
| 156246 | 2001 UQ_{174} | — | October 18, 2001 | Palomar | NEAT | (5) | 1.4 km | MPC · JPL |
| 156247 | 2001 UM_{179} | — | October 26, 2001 | Palomar | NEAT | · | 2.3 km | MPC · JPL |
| 156248 | 2001 UR_{186} | — | October 17, 2001 | Kitt Peak | Spacewatch | · | 1.6 km | MPC · JPL |
| 156249 | 2001 UT_{189} | — | October 18, 2001 | Palomar | NEAT | · | 1.8 km | MPC · JPL |
| 156250 | 2001 UM_{198} | — | October 19, 2001 | Palomar | NEAT | L5 | 9.7 km | MPC · JPL |
| 156251 | 2001 UN_{201} | — | October 19, 2001 | Palomar | NEAT | NYS | 2.1 km | MPC · JPL |
| 156252 | 2001 UV_{201} | — | October 19, 2001 | Palomar | NEAT | L5 | 10 km | MPC · JPL |
| 156253 | 2001 UC_{217} | — | October 24, 2001 | Socorro | LINEAR | · | 1.1 km | MPC · JPL |
| 156254 | 2001 UM_{217} | — | October 24, 2001 | Socorro | LINEAR | · | 1.8 km | MPC · JPL |
| 156255 | 2001 UQ_{220} | — | October 21, 2001 | Kitt Peak | Spacewatch | · | 1.4 km | MPC · JPL |
| 156256 | 2001 VC_{8} | — | November 9, 2001 | Socorro | LINEAR | · | 2.3 km | MPC · JPL |
| 156257 | 2001 VC_{10} | — | November 10, 2001 | Socorro | LINEAR | · | 3.6 km | MPC · JPL |
| 156258 | 2001 VE_{15} | — | November 10, 2001 | Socorro | LINEAR | · | 2.5 km | MPC · JPL |
| 156259 | 2001 VY_{18} | — | November 9, 2001 | Socorro | LINEAR | MAS | 1.1 km | MPC · JPL |
| 156260 | 2001 VJ_{19} | — | November 9, 2001 | Socorro | LINEAR | NYS | 2.0 km | MPC · JPL |
| 156261 | 2001 VD_{21} | — | November 9, 2001 | Socorro | LINEAR | · | 1.5 km | MPC · JPL |
| 156262 | 2001 VP_{22} | — | November 9, 2001 | Socorro | LINEAR | MAS | 1.2 km | MPC · JPL |
| 156263 | 2001 VC_{24} | — | November 9, 2001 | Socorro | LINEAR | · | 1.4 km | MPC · JPL |
| 156264 | 2001 VT_{27} | — | November 9, 2001 | Socorro | LINEAR | (5) | 4.0 km | MPC · JPL |
| 156265 | 2001 VH_{35} | — | November 9, 2001 | Socorro | LINEAR | (5) | 1.5 km | MPC · JPL |
| 156266 | 2001 VL_{35} | — | November 9, 2001 | Socorro | LINEAR | · | 1.6 km | MPC · JPL |
| 156267 | 2001 VN_{37} | — | November 9, 2001 | Socorro | LINEAR | · | 1.8 km | MPC · JPL |
| 156268 | 2001 VQ_{40} | — | November 9, 2001 | Socorro | LINEAR | (5) | 2.2 km | MPC · JPL |
| 156269 | 2001 VP_{47} | — | November 9, 2001 | Socorro | LINEAR | HNS | 2.5 km | MPC · JPL |
| 156270 | 2001 VF_{57} | — | November 10, 2001 | Socorro | LINEAR | · | 1.9 km | MPC · JPL |
| 156271 | 2001 VV_{59} | — | November 10, 2001 | Socorro | LINEAR | · | 2.2 km | MPC · JPL |
| 156272 | 2001 VO_{66} | — | November 10, 2001 | Socorro | LINEAR | · | 2.3 km | MPC · JPL |
| 156273 | 2001 VU_{70} | — | November 11, 2001 | Socorro | LINEAR | · | 1.7 km | MPC · JPL |
| 156274 | 2001 VY_{71} | — | November 12, 2001 | Kvistaberg | Uppsala-DLR Asteroid Survey | · | 3.6 km | MPC · JPL |
| 156275 | 2001 VC_{90} | — | November 15, 2001 | Socorro | LINEAR | (5) | 2.9 km | MPC · JPL |
| 156276 | 2001 VH_{90} | — | November 15, 2001 | Socorro | LINEAR | · | 1.5 km | MPC · JPL |
| 156277 | 2001 VN_{99} | — | November 15, 2001 | Socorro | LINEAR | · | 3.3 km | MPC · JPL |
| 156278 | 2001 VN_{105} | — | November 12, 2001 | Socorro | LINEAR | · | 1.6 km | MPC · JPL |
| 156279 | 2001 VO_{106} | — | November 12, 2001 | Socorro | LINEAR | · | 1.6 km | MPC · JPL |
| 156280 | 2001 VX_{119} | — | November 12, 2001 | Socorro | LINEAR | NYS | 1.9 km | MPC · JPL |
| 156281 | 2001 VC_{121} | — | November 12, 2001 | Socorro | LINEAR | · | 2.7 km | MPC · JPL |
| 156282 | 2001 VK_{126} | — | November 14, 2001 | Kitt Peak | Spacewatch | · | 1.4 km | MPC · JPL |
| 156283 | 2001 WN_{9} | — | November 17, 2001 | Socorro | LINEAR | (5) | 2.5 km | MPC · JPL |
| 156284 | 2001 WE_{11} | — | November 17, 2001 | Socorro | LINEAR | · | 2.1 km | MPC · JPL |
| 156285 | 2001 WG_{12} | — | November 17, 2001 | Socorro | LINEAR | NYS | 990 m | MPC · JPL |
| 156286 | 2001 WV_{13} | — | November 17, 2001 | Socorro | LINEAR | (5) | 1.5 km | MPC · JPL |
| 156287 | 2001 WU_{14} | — | November 17, 2001 | Kitt Peak | Spacewatch | V | 1.8 km | MPC · JPL |
| 156288 | 2001 WQ_{16} | — | November 17, 2001 | Socorro | LINEAR | NYS | 1.5 km | MPC · JPL |
| 156289 | 2001 WF_{17} | — | November 17, 2001 | Socorro | LINEAR | · | 1.9 km | MPC · JPL |
| 156290 | 2001 WK_{36} | — | November 17, 2001 | Socorro | LINEAR | (5) | 1.8 km | MPC · JPL |
| 156291 | 2001 WM_{38} | — | November 17, 2001 | Socorro | LINEAR | · | 2.6 km | MPC · JPL |
| 156292 | 2001 WA_{57} | — | November 19, 2001 | Socorro | LINEAR | · | 1.6 km | MPC · JPL |
| 156293 | 2001 WB_{59} | — | November 19, 2001 | Socorro | LINEAR | L5 | 13 km | MPC · JPL |
| 156294 | 2001 WU_{66} | — | November 20, 2001 | Socorro | LINEAR | L5 | 10 km | MPC · JPL |
| 156295 | 2001 XG_{5} | — | December 5, 2001 | Haleakala | NEAT | · | 3.1 km | MPC · JPL |
| 156296 | 2001 XU_{7} | — | December 8, 2001 | Socorro | LINEAR | EUN | 1.7 km | MPC · JPL |
| 156297 | 2001 XR_{8} | — | December 9, 2001 | Socorro | LINEAR | · | 4.5 km | MPC · JPL |
| 156298 | 2001 XT_{8} | — | December 9, 2001 | Socorro | LINEAR | MAR | 1.7 km | MPC · JPL |
| 156299 | 2001 XA_{11} | — | December 7, 2001 | Socorro | LINEAR | (5) | 3.0 km | MPC · JPL |
| 156300 | 2001 XD_{16} | — | December 10, 2001 | Socorro | LINEAR | · | 2.1 km | MPC · JPL |

== 156301–156400 ==
back to top

| Designation | | | Discovery | | | Properties | | Ref |
| Permanent | Provisional | Named after | Date | Site | Discoverer(s) | Category | Diam. | Ref |
|---|---|---|---|---|---|---|---|---|
| 156301 | 2001 XZ_{17} | — | December 9, 2001 | Socorro | LINEAR | · | 3.4 km | MPC · JPL |
| 156302 | 2001 XA_{18} | — | December 9, 2001 | Socorro | LINEAR | (5) | 3.2 km | MPC · JPL |
| 156303 | 2001 XU_{22} | — | December 9, 2001 | Socorro | LINEAR | (5) | 2.0 km | MPC · JPL |
| 156304 | 2001 XS_{28} | — | December 11, 2001 | Socorro | LINEAR | (5) | 2.5 km | MPC · JPL |
| 156305 | 2001 XQ_{32} | — | December 10, 2001 | Kitt Peak | Spacewatch | · | 1.7 km | MPC · JPL |
| 156306 | 2001 XS_{36} | — | December 9, 2001 | Socorro | LINEAR | · | 3.0 km | MPC · JPL |
| 156307 | 2001 XC_{42} | — | December 9, 2001 | Socorro | LINEAR | ADE | 3.1 km | MPC · JPL |
| 156308 | 2001 XN_{44} | — | December 9, 2001 | Socorro | LINEAR | · | 2.3 km | MPC · JPL |
| 156309 | 2001 XZ_{44} | — | December 9, 2001 | Socorro | LINEAR | · | 2.4 km | MPC · JPL |
| 156310 | 2001 XL_{46} | — | December 9, 2001 | Socorro | LINEAR | · | 2.1 km | MPC · JPL |
| 156311 | 2001 XD_{51} | — | December 10, 2001 | Socorro | LINEAR | · | 2.7 km | MPC · JPL |
| 156312 | 2001 XF_{55} | — | December 10, 2001 | Socorro | LINEAR | MAS | 1.4 km | MPC · JPL |
| 156313 | 2001 XE_{58} | — | December 10, 2001 | Socorro | LINEAR | NYS | 2.4 km | MPC · JPL |
| 156314 | 2001 XT_{62} | — | December 10, 2001 | Socorro | LINEAR | · | 2.7 km | MPC · JPL |
| 156315 | 2001 XY_{67} | — | December 10, 2001 | Socorro | LINEAR | · | 3.0 km | MPC · JPL |
| 156316 | 2001 XP_{68} | — | December 11, 2001 | Socorro | LINEAR | · | 3.3 km | MPC · JPL |
| 156317 | 2001 XM_{69} | — | December 11, 2001 | Socorro | LINEAR | · | 1.6 km | MPC · JPL |
| 156318 | 2001 XF_{76} | — | December 11, 2001 | Socorro | LINEAR | · | 2.2 km | MPC · JPL |
| 156319 | 2001 XR_{76} | — | December 11, 2001 | Socorro | LINEAR | · | 1.2 km | MPC · JPL |
| 156320 | 2001 XA_{78} | — | December 11, 2001 | Socorro | LINEAR | · | 2.1 km | MPC · JPL |
| 156321 | 2001 XH_{78} | — | December 11, 2001 | Socorro | LINEAR | · | 2.1 km | MPC · JPL |
| 156322 | 2001 XN_{82} | — | December 11, 2001 | Socorro | LINEAR | (5) | 1.7 km | MPC · JPL |
| 156323 | 2001 XL_{84} | — | December 11, 2001 | Socorro | LINEAR | MAR | 2.4 km | MPC · JPL |
| 156324 | 2001 XQ_{85} | — | December 11, 2001 | Socorro | LINEAR | · | 2.4 km | MPC · JPL |
| 156325 | 2001 XC_{98} | — | December 10, 2001 | Socorro | LINEAR | EUN | 2.5 km | MPC · JPL |
| 156326 | 2001 XG_{101} | — | December 10, 2001 | Socorro | LINEAR | · | 2.5 km | MPC · JPL |
| 156327 | 2001 XW_{101} | — | December 10, 2001 | Socorro | LINEAR | · | 4.1 km | MPC · JPL |
| 156328 | 2001 XP_{108} | — | December 10, 2001 | Socorro | LINEAR | · | 2.1 km | MPC · JPL |
| 156329 | 2001 XO_{110} | — | December 11, 2001 | Socorro | LINEAR | · | 2.5 km | MPC · JPL |
| 156330 | 2001 XD_{112} | — | December 11, 2001 | Socorro | LINEAR | ADE | 2.9 km | MPC · JPL |
| 156331 | 2001 XF_{115} | — | December 13, 2001 | Socorro | LINEAR | · | 2.2 km | MPC · JPL |
| 156332 | 2001 XY_{117} | — | December 13, 2001 | Socorro | LINEAR | · | 2.8 km | MPC · JPL |
| 156333 | 2001 XN_{125} | — | December 14, 2001 | Socorro | LINEAR | RAF | 1.3 km | MPC · JPL |
| 156334 | 2001 XH_{132} | — | December 14, 2001 | Socorro | LINEAR | · | 1.4 km | MPC · JPL |
| 156335 | 2001 XM_{132} | — | December 14, 2001 | Socorro | LINEAR | · | 1.6 km | MPC · JPL |
| 156336 | 2001 XC_{133} | — | December 14, 2001 | Socorro | LINEAR | · | 2.0 km | MPC · JPL |
| 156337 | 2001 XR_{133} | — | December 14, 2001 | Socorro | LINEAR | · | 1.8 km | MPC · JPL |
| 156338 | 2001 XW_{138} | — | December 14, 2001 | Socorro | LINEAR | · | 1.8 km | MPC · JPL |
| 156339 | 2001 XL_{148} | — | December 14, 2001 | Socorro | LINEAR | · | 2.7 km | MPC · JPL |
| 156340 | 2001 XU_{150} | — | December 14, 2001 | Socorro | LINEAR | · | 1.5 km | MPC · JPL |
| 156341 | 2001 XA_{153} | — | December 14, 2001 | Socorro | LINEAR | · | 2.3 km | MPC · JPL |
| 156342 | 2001 XT_{154} | — | December 14, 2001 | Socorro | LINEAR | MAS | 1.3 km | MPC · JPL |
| 156343 | 2001 XE_{163} | — | December 14, 2001 | Socorro | LINEAR | · | 1.7 km | MPC · JPL |
| 156344 | 2001 XT_{165} | — | December 14, 2001 | Socorro | LINEAR | EUN | 2.1 km | MPC · JPL |
| 156345 | 2001 XX_{168} | — | December 14, 2001 | Socorro | LINEAR | · | 1.9 km | MPC · JPL |
| 156346 | 2001 XY_{169} | — | December 14, 2001 | Socorro | LINEAR | · | 2.5 km | MPC · JPL |
| 156347 | 2001 XS_{170} | — | December 14, 2001 | Socorro | LINEAR | · | 1.7 km | MPC · JPL |
| 156348 | 2001 XW_{171} | — | December 14, 2001 | Socorro | LINEAR | EUN | 1.9 km | MPC · JPL |
| 156349 | 2001 XA_{175} | — | December 14, 2001 | Socorro | LINEAR | · | 2.1 km | MPC · JPL |
| 156350 | 2001 XS_{179} | — | December 14, 2001 | Socorro | LINEAR | · | 3.3 km | MPC · JPL |
| 156351 | 2001 XW_{182} | — | December 14, 2001 | Socorro | LINEAR | HNS | 2.8 km | MPC · JPL |
| 156352 | 2001 XF_{184} | — | December 14, 2001 | Socorro | LINEAR | · | 2.0 km | MPC · JPL |
| 156353 | 2001 XC_{189} | — | December 14, 2001 | Socorro | LINEAR | · | 2.1 km | MPC · JPL |
| 156354 | 2001 XO_{205} | — | December 11, 2001 | Socorro | LINEAR | · | 2.1 km | MPC · JPL |
| 156355 | 2001 XB_{207} | — | December 11, 2001 | Socorro | LINEAR | (5) | 2.5 km | MPC · JPL |
| 156356 | 2001 XU_{207} | — | December 11, 2001 | Socorro | LINEAR | · | 2.0 km | MPC · JPL |
| 156357 | 2001 XZ_{208} | — | December 11, 2001 | Socorro | LINEAR | · | 2.0 km | MPC · JPL |
| 156358 | 2001 XF_{214} | — | December 11, 2001 | Socorro | LINEAR | (5) | 3.9 km | MPC · JPL |
| 156359 | 2001 XV_{214} | — | December 13, 2001 | Socorro | LINEAR | (5) | 1.7 km | MPC · JPL |
| 156360 | 2001 XP_{215} | — | December 14, 2001 | Socorro | LINEAR | · | 2.0 km | MPC · JPL |
| 156361 | 2001 XU_{217} | — | December 14, 2001 | Socorro | LINEAR | · | 1.8 km | MPC · JPL |
| 156362 | 2001 XN_{224} | — | December 15, 2001 | Socorro | LINEAR | MAS | 1.3 km | MPC · JPL |
| 156363 | 2001 XZ_{228} | — | December 15, 2001 | Socorro | LINEAR | · | 2.3 km | MPC · JPL |
| 156364 | 2001 XG_{233} | — | December 15, 2001 | Socorro | LINEAR | MAS | 1.0 km | MPC · JPL |
| 156365 | 2001 XD_{235} | — | December 15, 2001 | Socorro | LINEAR | · | 2.3 km | MPC · JPL |
| 156366 | 2001 XV_{237} | — | December 15, 2001 | Socorro | LINEAR | · | 2.5 km | MPC · JPL |
| 156367 | 2001 XC_{248} | — | December 14, 2001 | Palomar | NEAT | · | 2.3 km | MPC · JPL |
| 156368 | 2001 XR_{252} | — | December 14, 2001 | Socorro | LINEAR | · | 2.8 km | MPC · JPL |
| 156369 | 2001 XD_{253} | — | December 14, 2001 | Socorro | LINEAR | (5) | 3.5 km | MPC · JPL |
| 156370 | 2001 XC_{260} | — | December 9, 2001 | Socorro | LINEAR | V | 1.3 km | MPC · JPL |
| 156371 | 2001 YN_{4} | — | December 22, 2001 | Socorro | LINEAR | · | 6.7 km | MPC · JPL |
| 156372 | 2001 YT_{4} | — | December 23, 2001 | Kingsnake | J. V. McClusky | EUN | 2.0 km | MPC · JPL |
| 156373 | 2001 YR_{12} | — | December 17, 2001 | Socorro | LINEAR | · | 2.2 km | MPC · JPL |
| 156374 | 2001 YU_{16} | — | December 17, 2001 | Socorro | LINEAR | · | 3.5 km | MPC · JPL |
| 156375 | 2001 YG_{23} | — | December 18, 2001 | Socorro | LINEAR | · | 1.6 km | MPC · JPL |
| 156376 | 2001 YB_{28} | — | December 18, 2001 | Socorro | LINEAR | · | 1.6 km | MPC · JPL |
| 156377 | 2001 YQ_{41} | — | December 18, 2001 | Socorro | LINEAR | KRM | 4.0 km | MPC · JPL |
| 156378 | 2001 YS_{47} | — | December 18, 2001 | Socorro | LINEAR | · | 1.8 km | MPC · JPL |
| 156379 | 2001 YJ_{64} | — | December 18, 2001 | Socorro | LINEAR | · | 2.5 km | MPC · JPL |
| 156380 | 2001 YL_{70} | — | December 18, 2001 | Socorro | LINEAR | (5) | 1.8 km | MPC · JPL |
| 156381 | 2001 YT_{71} | — | December 18, 2001 | Socorro | LINEAR | · | 2.2 km | MPC · JPL |
| 156382 | 2001 YU_{73} | — | December 18, 2001 | Socorro | LINEAR | EUN | 2.6 km | MPC · JPL |
| 156383 | 2001 YE_{80} | — | December 18, 2001 | Socorro | LINEAR | · | 2.0 km | MPC · JPL |
| 156384 | 2001 YS_{81} | — | December 18, 2001 | Socorro | LINEAR | · | 1.9 km | MPC · JPL |
| 156385 | 2001 YC_{83} | — | December 18, 2001 | Socorro | LINEAR | ADE | 3.7 km | MPC · JPL |
| 156386 | 2001 YR_{87} | — | December 18, 2001 | Socorro | LINEAR | ADE | 4.5 km | MPC · JPL |
| 156387 | 2001 YQ_{100} | — | December 17, 2001 | Socorro | LINEAR | · | 2.9 km | MPC · JPL |
| 156388 | 2001 YE_{101} | — | December 17, 2001 | Socorro | LINEAR | · | 1.8 km | MPC · JPL |
| 156389 | 2001 YJ_{102} | — | December 17, 2001 | Socorro | LINEAR | · | 2.1 km | MPC · JPL |
| 156390 | 2001 YM_{103} | — | December 17, 2001 | Socorro | LINEAR | MAR | 2.2 km | MPC · JPL |
| 156391 | 2001 YX_{107} | — | December 17, 2001 | Socorro | LINEAR | (5) | 2.1 km | MPC · JPL |
| 156392 | 2001 YA_{113} | — | December 18, 2001 | Palomar | NEAT | DOR | 4.1 km | MPC · JPL |
| 156393 | 2001 YA_{124} | — | December 17, 2001 | Socorro | LINEAR | ERI | 3.7 km | MPC · JPL |
| 156394 | 2001 YA_{139} | — | December 23, 2001 | Kitt Peak | Spacewatch | · | 3.4 km | MPC · JPL |
| 156395 | 2001 YS_{140} | — | December 17, 2001 | Socorro | LINEAR | · | 1.8 km | MPC · JPL |
| 156396 | 2001 YH_{146} | — | December 18, 2001 | Palomar | NEAT | · | 2.4 km | MPC · JPL |
| 156397 | 2001 YK_{147} | — | December 18, 2001 | Anderson Mesa | LONEOS | EUN · | 3.1 km | MPC · JPL |
| 156398 | 2001 YC_{153} | — | December 19, 2001 | Anderson Mesa | LONEOS | EUN | 1.9 km | MPC · JPL |
| 156399 | 2001 YA_{156} | — | December 20, 2001 | Palomar | NEAT | · | 3.0 km | MPC · JPL |
| 156400 | 2001 YR_{161} | — | December 19, 2001 | Anderson Mesa | LONEOS | EUN | 1.9 km | MPC · JPL |

== 156401–156500 ==
back to top

| Designation | | | Discovery | | | Properties | | Ref |
| Permanent | Provisional | Named after | Date | Site | Discoverer(s) | Category | Diam. | Ref |
|---|---|---|---|---|---|---|---|---|
| 156401 | 2002 AK_{3} | — | January 5, 2002 | Cima Ekar | ADAS | · | 2.8 km | MPC · JPL |
| 156402 | 2002 AO_{4} | — | January 8, 2002 | Socorro | LINEAR | · | 4.1 km | MPC · JPL |
| 156403 | 2002 AX_{20} | — | January 8, 2002 | Palomar | NEAT | · | 2.6 km | MPC · JPL |
| 156404 | 2002 AQ_{24} | — | January 8, 2002 | Palomar | NEAT | HNS | 2.8 km | MPC · JPL |
| 156405 | 2002 AS_{34} | — | January 10, 2002 | Palomar | NEAT | · | 2.9 km | MPC · JPL |
| 156406 | 2002 AW_{40} | — | January 9, 2002 | Socorro | LINEAR | · | 3.2 km | MPC · JPL |
| 156407 | 2002 AE_{42} | — | January 9, 2002 | Socorro | LINEAR | MRX | 1.8 km | MPC · JPL |
| 156408 | 2002 AE_{44} | — | January 9, 2002 | Socorro | LINEAR | · | 1.9 km | MPC · JPL |
| 156409 | 2002 AO_{46} | — | January 9, 2002 | Socorro | LINEAR | · | 6.1 km | MPC · JPL |
| 156410 | 2002 AG_{49} | — | January 9, 2002 | Socorro | LINEAR | · | 2.9 km | MPC · JPL |
| 156411 | 2002 AM_{55} | — | January 9, 2002 | Socorro | LINEAR | · | 2.3 km | MPC · JPL |
| 156412 | 2002 AQ_{57} | — | January 9, 2002 | Socorro | LINEAR | · | 6.6 km | MPC · JPL |
| 156413 | 2002 AQ_{63} | — | January 11, 2002 | Socorro | LINEAR | · | 4.9 km | MPC · JPL |
| 156414 | 2002 AS_{67} | — | January 8, 2002 | Kitt Peak | Spacewatch | · | 2.3 km | MPC · JPL |
| 156415 | 2002 AN_{70} | — | January 8, 2002 | Socorro | LINEAR | · | 2.2 km | MPC · JPL |
| 156416 | 2002 AZ_{73} | — | January 8, 2002 | Socorro | LINEAR | · | 2.1 km | MPC · JPL |
| 156417 | 2002 AA_{77} | — | January 8, 2002 | Socorro | LINEAR | · | 1.7 km | MPC · JPL |
| 156418 | 2002 AV_{81} | — | January 9, 2002 | Socorro | LINEAR | · | 2.6 km | MPC · JPL |
| 156419 | 2002 AJ_{82} | — | January 9, 2002 | Socorro | LINEAR | · | 3.3 km | MPC · JPL |
| 156420 | 2002 AC_{86} | — | January 9, 2002 | Socorro | LINEAR | HNS | 1.8 km | MPC · JPL |
| 156421 | 2002 AA_{87} | — | January 9, 2002 | Socorro | LINEAR | · | 3.2 km | MPC · JPL |
| 156422 | 2002 AW_{88} | — | January 9, 2002 | Socorro | LINEAR | · | 2.6 km | MPC · JPL |
| 156423 | 2002 AD_{92} | — | January 12, 2002 | Cerro Tololo | Deep Lens Survey | BRA | 2.5 km | MPC · JPL |
| 156424 | 2002 AG_{94} | — | January 8, 2002 | Socorro | LINEAR | · | 1.4 km | MPC · JPL |
| 156425 | 2002 AE_{97} | — | January 8, 2002 | Socorro | LINEAR | · | 3.0 km | MPC · JPL |
| 156426 | 2002 AJ_{101} | — | January 8, 2002 | Socorro | LINEAR | · | 3.3 km | MPC · JPL |
| 156427 | 2002 AV_{101} | — | January 8, 2002 | Socorro | LINEAR | · | 2.5 km | MPC · JPL |
| 156428 | 2002 AD_{102} | — | January 8, 2002 | Socorro | LINEAR | · | 4.0 km | MPC · JPL |
| 156429 | 2002 AJ_{102} | — | January 8, 2002 | Socorro | LINEAR | (21344) | 2.7 km | MPC · JPL |
| 156430 | 2002 AL_{103} | — | January 8, 2002 | Socorro | LINEAR | MAS | 1.6 km | MPC · JPL |
| 156431 | 2002 AX_{104} | — | January 9, 2002 | Socorro | LINEAR | · | 2.4 km | MPC · JPL |
| 156432 | 2002 AZ_{104} | — | January 9, 2002 | Socorro | LINEAR | · | 2.2 km | MPC · JPL |
| 156433 | 2002 AD_{113} | — | January 9, 2002 | Socorro | LINEAR | · | 2.6 km | MPC · JPL |
| 156434 | 2002 AT_{119} | — | January 9, 2002 | Socorro | LINEAR | · | 3.3 km | MPC · JPL |
| 156435 | 2002 AO_{120} | — | January 9, 2002 | Socorro | LINEAR | BRU | 7.7 km | MPC · JPL |
| 156436 | 2002 AB_{123} | — | January 9, 2002 | Socorro | LINEAR | · | 2.6 km | MPC · JPL |
| 156437 | 2002 AS_{136} | — | January 9, 2002 | Socorro | LINEAR | · | 2.7 km | MPC · JPL |
| 156438 | 2002 AZ_{140} | — | January 13, 2002 | Socorro | LINEAR | · | 2.7 km | MPC · JPL |
| 156439 | 2002 AT_{146} | — | January 13, 2002 | Socorro | LINEAR | · | 1.6 km | MPC · JPL |
| 156440 | 2002 AY_{148} | — | January 13, 2002 | Socorro | LINEAR | · | 2.6 km | MPC · JPL |
| 156441 | 2002 AU_{154} | — | January 14, 2002 | Socorro | LINEAR | · | 1.6 km | MPC · JPL |
| 156442 | 2002 AG_{157} | — | January 13, 2002 | Socorro | LINEAR | · | 3.2 km | MPC · JPL |
| 156443 | 2002 AR_{160} | — | January 13, 2002 | Socorro | LINEAR | · | 2.4 km | MPC · JPL |
| 156444 | 2002 AH_{163} | — | January 13, 2002 | Socorro | LINEAR | EUN | 2.2 km | MPC · JPL |
| 156445 | 2002 AQ_{163} | — | January 13, 2002 | Socorro | LINEAR | · | 2.9 km | MPC · JPL |
| 156446 | 2002 AZ_{166} | — | January 13, 2002 | Socorro | LINEAR | · | 1.7 km | MPC · JPL |
| 156447 | 2002 AM_{177} | — | January 14, 2002 | Socorro | LINEAR | · | 2.5 km | MPC · JPL |
| 156448 | 2002 AU_{180} | — | January 5, 2002 | Palomar | NEAT | JUN | 1.7 km | MPC · JPL |
| 156449 | 2002 AH_{182} | — | January 5, 2002 | Palomar | NEAT | · | 2.6 km | MPC · JPL |
| 156450 | 2002 AS_{198} | — | January 12, 2002 | Socorro | LINEAR | NYS | 1.8 km | MPC · JPL |
| 156451 | 2002 AH_{203} | — | January 5, 2002 | Kitt Peak | Spacewatch | · | 2.0 km | MPC · JPL |
| 156452 | 2002 BU_{3} | — | January 18, 2002 | Anderson Mesa | LONEOS | · | 3.6 km | MPC · JPL |
| 156453 | 2002 BC_{8} | — | January 18, 2002 | Socorro | LINEAR | (21344) | 2.7 km | MPC · JPL |
| 156454 | 2002 BN_{9} | — | January 18, 2002 | Socorro | LINEAR | · | 2.4 km | MPC · JPL |
| 156455 | 2002 BD_{14} | — | January 19, 2002 | Socorro | LINEAR | · | 2.4 km | MPC · JPL |
| 156456 | 2002 BD_{16} | — | January 19, 2002 | Socorro | LINEAR | · | 2.4 km | MPC · JPL |
| 156457 | 2002 BU_{24} | — | January 23, 2002 | Socorro | LINEAR | · | 2.6 km | MPC · JPL |
| 156458 | 2002 BP_{27} | — | January 20, 2002 | Anderson Mesa | LONEOS | · | 2.1 km | MPC · JPL |
| 156459 | 2002 BQ_{27} | — | January 20, 2002 | Anderson Mesa | LONEOS | · | 4.2 km | MPC · JPL |
| 156460 | 2002 BU_{27} | — | January 20, 2002 | Anderson Mesa | LONEOS | · | 2.0 km | MPC · JPL |
| 156461 | 2002 BM_{29} | — | January 20, 2002 | Anderson Mesa | LONEOS | · | 3.7 km | MPC · JPL |
| 156462 | 2002 BZ_{30} | — | January 19, 2002 | Anderson Mesa | LONEOS | EUN | 2.0 km | MPC · JPL |
| 156463 | 2002 CS_{2} | — | February 3, 2002 | Palomar | NEAT | · | 3.0 km | MPC · JPL |
| 156464 | 2002 CD_{5} | — | February 4, 2002 | Palomar | NEAT | · | 2.0 km | MPC · JPL |
| 156465 | 2002 CB_{8} | — | February 4, 2002 | Palomar | NEAT | · | 2.0 km | MPC · JPL |
| 156466 | 2002 CG_{10} | — | February 6, 2002 | Socorro | LINEAR | H | 460 m | MPC · JPL |
| 156467 | 2002 CK_{21} | — | February 5, 2002 | Palomar | NEAT | · | 2.6 km | MPC · JPL |
| 156468 | 2002 CQ_{33} | — | February 6, 2002 | Socorro | LINEAR | ADE · | 4.5 km | MPC · JPL |
| 156469 | 2002 CV_{33} | — | February 6, 2002 | Socorro | LINEAR | · | 3.8 km | MPC · JPL |
| 156470 | 2002 CM_{37} | — | February 7, 2002 | Socorro | LINEAR | · | 3.1 km | MPC · JPL |
| 156471 | 2002 CE_{40} | — | February 6, 2002 | Haleakala | NEAT | · | 2.2 km | MPC · JPL |
| 156472 | 2002 CP_{45} | — | February 8, 2002 | Kitt Peak | Spacewatch | · | 2.5 km | MPC · JPL |
| 156473 | 2002 CK_{46} | — | February 6, 2002 | Goodricke-Pigott | R. A. Tucker | · | 4.3 km | MPC · JPL |
| 156474 | 2002 CN_{46} | — | February 11, 2002 | Gnosca | S. Sposetti | · | 2.8 km | MPC · JPL |
| 156475 | 2002 CG_{47} | — | February 3, 2002 | Haleakala | NEAT | · | 2.5 km | MPC · JPL |
| 156476 | 2002 CO_{49} | — | February 3, 2002 | Palomar | NEAT | (5) | 2.0 km | MPC · JPL |
| 156477 | 2002 CO_{52} | — | February 12, 2002 | Desert Eagle | W. K. Y. Yeung | · | 3.3 km | MPC · JPL |
| 156478 | 2002 CV_{53} | — | February 7, 2002 | Socorro | LINEAR | · | 3.3 km | MPC · JPL |
| 156479 | 2002 CR_{60} | — | February 6, 2002 | Socorro | LINEAR | · | 3.7 km | MPC · JPL |
| 156480 | 2002 CH_{62} | — | February 6, 2002 | Socorro | LINEAR | · | 3.4 km | MPC · JPL |
| 156481 | 2002 CH_{63} | — | February 6, 2002 | Socorro | LINEAR | · | 2.6 km | MPC · JPL |
| 156482 | 2002 CS_{63} | — | February 6, 2002 | Socorro | LINEAR | HNS | 2.5 km | MPC · JPL |
| 156483 | 2002 CX_{63} | — | February 6, 2002 | Socorro | LINEAR | DOR | 3.8 km | MPC · JPL |
| 156484 | 2002 CG_{65} | — | February 6, 2002 | Socorro | LINEAR | · | 3.3 km | MPC · JPL |
| 156485 | 2002 CE_{66} | — | February 7, 2002 | Socorro | LINEAR | · | 1.9 km | MPC · JPL |
| 156486 | 2002 CO_{79} | — | February 7, 2002 | Socorro | LINEAR | · | 4.6 km | MPC · JPL |
| 156487 | 2002 CU_{85} | — | February 7, 2002 | Socorro | LINEAR | · | 2.3 km | MPC · JPL |
| 156488 | 2002 CV_{88} | — | February 7, 2002 | Socorro | LINEAR | · | 2.5 km | MPC · JPL |
| 156489 | 2002 CY_{93} | — | February 7, 2002 | Socorro | LINEAR | · | 3.0 km | MPC · JPL |
| 156490 | 2002 CX_{94} | — | February 7, 2002 | Socorro | LINEAR | NEM | 3.7 km | MPC · JPL |
| 156491 | 2002 CN_{101} | — | February 7, 2002 | Socorro | LINEAR | · | 3.1 km | MPC · JPL |
| 156492 | 2002 CN_{108} | — | February 7, 2002 | Socorro | LINEAR | DOR | 5.5 km | MPC · JPL |
| 156493 | 2002 CC_{111} | — | February 7, 2002 | Socorro | LINEAR | · | 3.5 km | MPC · JPL |
| 156494 | 2002 CT_{120} | — | February 7, 2002 | Socorro | LINEAR | · | 3.0 km | MPC · JPL |
| 156495 | 2002 CD_{122} | — | February 7, 2002 | Socorro | LINEAR | · | 2.6 km | MPC · JPL |
| 156496 | 2002 CN_{122} | — | February 7, 2002 | Socorro | LINEAR | (5) | 1.9 km | MPC · JPL |
| 156497 | 2002 CW_{129} | — | February 7, 2002 | Socorro | LINEAR | · | 2.6 km | MPC · JPL |
| 156498 | 2002 CZ_{129} | — | February 7, 2002 | Socorro | LINEAR | · | 3.1 km | MPC · JPL |
| 156499 | 2002 CD_{138} | — | February 8, 2002 | Socorro | LINEAR | MRX | 1.7 km | MPC · JPL |
| 156500 | 2002 CU_{142} | — | February 9, 2002 | Socorro | LINEAR | · | 2.6 km | MPC · JPL |

== 156501–156600 ==
back to top

| Designation | | | Discovery | | | Properties | | Ref |
| Permanent | Provisional | Named after | Date | Site | Discoverer(s) | Category | Diam. | Ref |
|---|---|---|---|---|---|---|---|---|
| 156501 | 2002 CZ_{142} | — | February 9, 2002 | Socorro | LINEAR | · | 2.9 km | MPC · JPL |
| 156502 | 2002 CZ_{143} | — | February 9, 2002 | Socorro | LINEAR | EOS · | 2.6 km | MPC · JPL |
| 156503 | 2002 CD_{151} | — | February 10, 2002 | Socorro | LINEAR | · | 3.0 km | MPC · JPL |
| 156504 | 2002 CX_{162} | — | February 8, 2002 | Socorro | LINEAR | (5) | 2.1 km | MPC · JPL |
| 156505 | 2002 CA_{163} | — | February 8, 2002 | Socorro | LINEAR | · | 3.0 km | MPC · JPL |
| 156506 | 2002 CW_{165} | — | February 8, 2002 | Socorro | LINEAR | · | 2.8 km | MPC · JPL |
| 156507 | 2002 CH_{166} | — | February 8, 2002 | Socorro | LINEAR | · | 2.4 km | MPC · JPL |
| 156508 | 2002 CH_{167} | — | February 8, 2002 | Socorro | LINEAR | · | 3.3 km | MPC · JPL |
| 156509 | 2002 CJ_{168} | — | February 8, 2002 | Socorro | LINEAR | · | 4.1 km | MPC · JPL |
| 156510 | 2002 CF_{171} | — | February 8, 2002 | Socorro | LINEAR | · | 4.0 km | MPC · JPL |
| 156511 | 2002 CS_{183} | — | February 10, 2002 | Socorro | LINEAR | · | 2.6 km | MPC · JPL |
| 156512 | 2002 CX_{186} | — | February 10, 2002 | Socorro | LINEAR | · | 2.0 km | MPC · JPL |
| 156513 | 2002 CJ_{199} | — | February 10, 2002 | Socorro | LINEAR | · | 2.4 km | MPC · JPL |
| 156514 | 2002 CR_{203} | — | February 10, 2002 | Socorro | LINEAR | · | 2.6 km | MPC · JPL |
| 156515 | 2002 CB_{214} | — | February 10, 2002 | Socorro | LINEAR | (12739) | 2.6 km | MPC · JPL |
| 156516 | 2002 CR_{215} | — | February 10, 2002 | Socorro | LINEAR | (12739) | 2.7 km | MPC · JPL |
| 156517 | 2002 CQ_{216} | — | February 10, 2002 | Socorro | LINEAR | · | 3.0 km | MPC · JPL |
| 156518 | 2002 CV_{216} | — | February 10, 2002 | Socorro | LINEAR | · | 3.5 km | MPC · JPL |
| 156519 | 2002 CQ_{217} | — | February 10, 2002 | Socorro | LINEAR | · | 3.2 km | MPC · JPL |
| 156520 | 2002 CB_{221} | — | February 10, 2002 | Socorro | LINEAR | · | 5.5 km | MPC · JPL |
| 156521 | 2002 CQ_{228} | — | February 6, 2002 | Palomar | NEAT | · | 3.2 km | MPC · JPL |
| 156522 | 2002 CO_{230} | — | February 12, 2002 | Kitt Peak | Spacewatch | · | 3.4 km | MPC · JPL |
| 156523 | 2002 CL_{249} | — | February 15, 2002 | Socorro | LINEAR | · | 2.7 km | MPC · JPL |
| 156524 | 2002 CS_{253} | — | February 4, 2002 | Anderson Mesa | LONEOS | · | 3.3 km | MPC · JPL |
| 156525 | 2002 CW_{253} | — | February 4, 2002 | Palomar | NEAT | · | 2.8 km | MPC · JPL |
| 156526 | 2002 CT_{254} | — | February 6, 2002 | Anderson Mesa | LONEOS | EUN | 2.1 km | MPC · JPL |
| 156527 | 2002 CD_{256} | — | February 4, 2002 | Palomar | NEAT | NEM | 3.3 km | MPC · JPL |
| 156528 | 2002 CS_{258} | — | February 6, 2002 | Palomar | NEAT | · | 2.4 km | MPC · JPL |
| 156529 | 2002 CR_{259} | — | February 6, 2002 | Kitt Peak | Spacewatch | DOR | 3.2 km | MPC · JPL |
| 156530 | 2002 CT_{263} | — | February 7, 2002 | Palomar | NEAT | · | 3.4 km | MPC · JPL |
| 156531 | 2002 CA_{268} | — | February 7, 2002 | Anderson Mesa | LONEOS | ADE | 5.2 km | MPC · JPL |
| 156532 | 2002 CA_{277} | — | February 7, 2002 | Palomar | NEAT | NEM | 3.3 km | MPC · JPL |
| 156533 | 2002 CP_{279} | — | February 7, 2002 | Kitt Peak | Spacewatch | (17392) | 2.5 km | MPC · JPL |
| 156534 | 2002 CK_{283} | — | February 8, 2002 | Kitt Peak | Spacewatch | KOR | 2.3 km | MPC · JPL |
| 156535 | 2002 CT_{294} | — | February 10, 2002 | Socorro | LINEAR | · | 3.0 km | MPC · JPL |
| 156536 | 2002 CV_{297} | — | February 11, 2002 | Socorro | LINEAR | NEM | 3.5 km | MPC · JPL |
| 156537 | 2002 CU_{300} | — | February 11, 2002 | Socorro | LINEAR | · | 3.0 km | MPC · JPL |
| 156538 | 2002 CG_{301} | — | February 11, 2002 | Socorro | LINEAR | · | 2.9 km | MPC · JPL |
| 156539 | 2002 CK_{309} | — | February 11, 2002 | Socorro | LINEAR | · | 4.1 km | MPC · JPL |
| 156540 | 2002 CK_{310} | — | February 6, 2002 | Palomar | NEAT | · | 2.1 km | MPC · JPL |
| 156541 | 2002 CA_{311} | — | February 10, 2002 | Socorro | LINEAR | · | 3.0 km | MPC · JPL |
| 156542 Hogg | 2002 CM_{314} | Hogg | February 13, 2002 | Apache Point | SDSS | KOR | 1.7 km | MPC · JPL |
| 156543 | 2002 DW_{1} | — | February 19, 2002 | Socorro | LINEAR | · | 3.7 km | MPC · JPL |
| 156544 | 2002 DZ_{8} | — | February 19, 2002 | Socorro | LINEAR | EUN | 2.4 km | MPC · JPL |
| 156545 | 2002 DF_{10} | — | February 20, 2002 | Socorro | LINEAR | · | 2.7 km | MPC · JPL |
| 156546 | 2002 DN_{14} | — | February 16, 2002 | Palomar | NEAT | · | 2.4 km | MPC · JPL |
| 156547 | 2002 DX_{14} | — | February 16, 2002 | Palomar | NEAT | · | 2.8 km | MPC · JPL |
| 156548 | 2002 EM_{1} | — | March 6, 2002 | Ondřejov | P. Kušnirák | · | 3.3 km | MPC · JPL |
| 156549 | 2002 EY_{3} | — | March 10, 2002 | Cima Ekar | ADAS | · | 2.7 km | MPC · JPL |
| 156550 | 2002 ES_{12} | — | March 12, 2002 | Bohyunsan | Bohyunsan | · | 2.0 km | MPC · JPL |
| 156551 | 2002 EH_{29} | — | March 9, 2002 | Socorro | LINEAR | (16286) | 4.0 km | MPC · JPL |
| 156552 | 2002 EL_{29} | — | March 9, 2002 | Socorro | LINEAR | · | 3.0 km | MPC · JPL |
| 156553 | 2002 EC_{31} | — | March 9, 2002 | Socorro | LINEAR | KOR | 2.9 km | MPC · JPL |
| 156554 | 2002 ET_{39} | — | March 9, 2002 | Socorro | LINEAR | · | 3.6 km | MPC · JPL |
| 156555 | 2002 EB_{47} | — | March 12, 2002 | Palomar | NEAT | · | 3.1 km | MPC · JPL |
| 156556 | 2002 EE_{47} | — | March 12, 2002 | Palomar | NEAT | · | 3.9 km | MPC · JPL |
| 156557 | 2002 EQ_{50} | — | March 12, 2002 | Palomar | NEAT | · | 2.7 km | MPC · JPL |
| 156558 | 2002 EV_{50} | — | March 12, 2002 | Palomar | NEAT | · | 3.9 km | MPC · JPL |
| 156559 | 2002 EX_{51} | — | March 9, 2002 | Socorro | LINEAR | PAD | 4.4 km | MPC · JPL |
| 156560 | 2002 EE_{54} | — | March 13, 2002 | Socorro | LINEAR | · | 3.6 km | MPC · JPL |
| 156561 | 2002 EK_{61} | — | March 13, 2002 | Socorro | LINEAR | KOR | 2.4 km | MPC · JPL |
| 156562 | 2002 EB_{64} | — | March 13, 2002 | Socorro | LINEAR | · | 3.9 km | MPC · JPL |
| 156563 | 2002 EL_{76} | — | March 11, 2002 | Kitt Peak | Spacewatch | · | 2.6 km | MPC · JPL |
| 156564 | 2002 EC_{82} | — | March 13, 2002 | Palomar | NEAT | · | 3.4 km | MPC · JPL |
| 156565 | 2002 EF_{85} | — | March 9, 2002 | Socorro | LINEAR | (13314) | 4.0 km | MPC · JPL |
| 156566 | 2002 EU_{85} | — | March 9, 2002 | Socorro | LINEAR | · | 3.7 km | MPC · JPL |
| 156567 | 2002 EL_{86} | — | March 9, 2002 | Socorro | LINEAR | · | 3.2 km | MPC · JPL |
| 156568 | 2002 EN_{97} | — | March 12, 2002 | Socorro | LINEAR | · | 3.8 km | MPC · JPL |
| 156569 | 2002 EP_{101} | — | March 6, 2002 | Socorro | LINEAR | · | 4.5 km | MPC · JPL |
| 156570 | 2002 EF_{102} | — | March 6, 2002 | Socorro | LINEAR | · | 4.1 km | MPC · JPL |
| 156571 | 2002 EX_{106} | — | March 9, 2002 | Anderson Mesa | LONEOS | · | 2.6 km | MPC · JPL |
| 156572 | 2002 EC_{129} | — | March 13, 2002 | Socorro | LINEAR | PAD | 3.6 km | MPC · JPL |
| 156573 | 2002 EP_{131} | — | March 13, 2002 | Kitt Peak | Spacewatch | KOR | 2.1 km | MPC · JPL |
| 156574 | 2002 EK_{133} | — | March 13, 2002 | Socorro | LINEAR | · | 3.3 km | MPC · JPL |
| 156575 | 2002 ER_{136} | — | March 12, 2002 | Palomar | NEAT | · | 4.7 km | MPC · JPL |
| 156576 | 2002 EF_{139} | — | March 12, 2002 | Kitt Peak | Spacewatch | · | 2.7 km | MPC · JPL |
| 156577 | 2002 EH_{139} | — | March 12, 2002 | Kitt Peak | Spacewatch | PAD | 3.4 km | MPC · JPL |
| 156578 | 2002 EZ_{149} | — | March 15, 2002 | Palomar | NEAT | · | 2.9 km | MPC · JPL |
| 156579 | 2002 ES_{150} | — | March 15, 2002 | Palomar | NEAT | · | 3.6 km | MPC · JPL |
| 156580 Madách | 2002 EF_{157} | Madách | March 3, 2002 | Piszkéstető | K. Sárneczky | · | 2.6 km | MPC · JPL |
| 156581 | 2002 FO | — | March 16, 2002 | Socorro | LINEAR | H | 680 m | MPC · JPL |
| 156582 | 2002 FK_{20} | — | March 18, 2002 | Haleakala | NEAT | · | 4.1 km | MPC · JPL |
| 156583 | 2002 FF_{21} | — | March 19, 2002 | Anderson Mesa | LONEOS | KOR | 2.3 km | MPC · JPL |
| 156584 | 2002 FH_{30} | — | March 20, 2002 | Socorro | LINEAR | · | 4.5 km | MPC · JPL |
| 156585 | 2002 GN_{37} | — | April 3, 2002 | Kitt Peak | Spacewatch | HOF | 4.8 km | MPC · JPL |
| 156586 | 2002 GV_{41} | — | April 4, 2002 | Palomar | NEAT | EOS | 2.8 km | MPC · JPL |
| 156587 | 2002 GB_{42} | — | April 4, 2002 | Palomar | NEAT | · | 4.1 km | MPC · JPL |
| 156588 | 2002 GH_{45} | — | April 4, 2002 | Palomar | NEAT | · | 2.5 km | MPC · JPL |
| 156589 | 2002 GT_{51} | — | April 5, 2002 | Palomar | NEAT | · | 4.1 km | MPC · JPL |
| 156590 | 2002 GD_{52} | — | April 5, 2002 | Palomar | NEAT | · | 2.6 km | MPC · JPL |
| 156591 | 2002 GP_{54} | — | April 5, 2002 | Palomar | NEAT | KOR | 2.8 km | MPC · JPL |
| 156592 | 2002 GF_{59} | — | April 8, 2002 | Kitt Peak | Spacewatch | THM | 2.9 km | MPC · JPL |
| 156593 | 2002 GS_{63} | — | April 8, 2002 | Palomar | NEAT | · | 4.5 km | MPC · JPL |
| 156594 | 2002 GT_{66} | — | April 8, 2002 | Palomar | NEAT | GEF | 3.1 km | MPC · JPL |
| 156595 | 2002 GU_{68} | — | April 8, 2002 | Socorro | LINEAR | · | 4.9 km | MPC · JPL |
| 156596 | 2002 GQ_{70} | — | April 8, 2002 | Kitt Peak | Spacewatch | LIX | 7.1 km | MPC · JPL |
| 156597 | 2002 GJ_{72} | — | April 9, 2002 | Anderson Mesa | LONEOS | KOR | 2.8 km | MPC · JPL |
| 156598 | 2002 GA_{76} | — | April 9, 2002 | Socorro | LINEAR | · | 2.9 km | MPC · JPL |
| 156599 | 2002 GY_{76} | — | April 9, 2002 | Anderson Mesa | LONEOS | · | 4.3 km | MPC · JPL |
| 156600 | 2002 GK_{78} | — | April 9, 2002 | Socorro | LINEAR | BRA | 3.2 km | MPC · JPL |

== 156601–156700 ==
back to top

| Designation | | | Discovery | | | Properties | | Ref |
| Permanent | Provisional | Named after | Date | Site | Discoverer(s) | Category | Diam. | Ref |
|---|---|---|---|---|---|---|---|---|
| 156601 | 2002 GT_{78} | — | April 9, 2002 | Kvistaberg | Uppsala-DLR Asteroid Survey | · | 6.2 km | MPC · JPL |
| 156602 | 2002 GN_{82} | — | April 10, 2002 | Socorro | LINEAR | EOS | 3.3 km | MPC · JPL |
| 156603 | 2002 GR_{82} | — | April 10, 2002 | Socorro | LINEAR | · | 3.4 km | MPC · JPL |
| 156604 | 2002 GG_{83} | — | April 10, 2002 | Socorro | LINEAR | · | 5.4 km | MPC · JPL |
| 156605 | 2002 GE_{84} | — | April 10, 2002 | Socorro | LINEAR | · | 5.5 km | MPC · JPL |
| 156606 | 2002 GV_{85} | — | April 10, 2002 | Socorro | LINEAR | EOS | 3.4 km | MPC · JPL |
| 156607 | 2002 GE_{91} | — | April 8, 2002 | Bergisch Gladbach | W. Bickel | · | 3.8 km | MPC · JPL |
| 156608 | 2002 GF_{104} | — | April 10, 2002 | Socorro | LINEAR | TEL | 2.6 km | MPC · JPL |
| 156609 | 2002 GH_{109} | — | April 11, 2002 | Anderson Mesa | LONEOS | · | 3.3 km | MPC · JPL |
| 156610 | 2002 GK_{114} | — | April 11, 2002 | Socorro | LINEAR | · | 6.5 km | MPC · JPL |
| 156611 | 2002 GS_{119} | — | April 12, 2002 | Socorro | LINEAR | EOS | 2.7 km | MPC · JPL |
| 156612 | 2002 GH_{120} | — | April 12, 2002 | Socorro | LINEAR | · | 3.9 km | MPC · JPL |
| 156613 | 2002 GA_{128} | — | April 12, 2002 | Socorro | LINEAR | KOR | 1.9 km | MPC · JPL |
| 156614 | 2002 GH_{130} | — | April 12, 2002 | Socorro | LINEAR | · | 3.4 km | MPC · JPL |
| 156615 | 2002 GL_{130} | — | April 12, 2002 | Socorro | LINEAR | · | 2.4 km | MPC · JPL |
| 156616 | 2002 GS_{133} | — | April 12, 2002 | Socorro | LINEAR | · | 4.4 km | MPC · JPL |
| 156617 | 2002 GM_{138} | — | April 12, 2002 | Palomar | NEAT | · | 3.1 km | MPC · JPL |
| 156618 | 2002 GD_{141} | — | April 13, 2002 | Palomar | NEAT | · | 4.7 km | MPC · JPL |
| 156619 | 2002 GL_{144} | — | April 11, 2002 | Palomar | NEAT | BRA | 3.0 km | MPC · JPL |
| 156620 | 2002 GW_{145} | — | April 12, 2002 | Palomar | NEAT | · | 5.0 km | MPC · JPL |
| 156621 | 2002 GV_{146} | — | April 13, 2002 | Palomar | NEAT | · | 2.8 km | MPC · JPL |
| 156622 | 2002 GY_{150} | — | April 14, 2002 | Socorro | LINEAR | · | 4.2 km | MPC · JPL |
| 156623 | 2002 GT_{152} | — | April 12, 2002 | Palomar | NEAT | · | 3.7 km | MPC · JPL |
| 156624 | 2002 GT_{156} | — | April 13, 2002 | Palomar | NEAT | · | 4.3 km | MPC · JPL |
| 156625 | 2002 GU_{163} | — | April 14, 2002 | Palomar | NEAT | AGN | 2.4 km | MPC · JPL |
| 156626 | 2002 GV_{167} | — | April 9, 2002 | Socorro | LINEAR | BRA | 3.5 km | MPC · JPL |
| 156627 | 2002 GG_{174} | — | April 11, 2002 | Socorro | LINEAR | · | 4.3 km | MPC · JPL |
| 156628 | 2002 GD_{180} | — | April 8, 2002 | Palomar | NEAT | · | 3.2 km | MPC · JPL |
| 156629 | 2002 HC | — | April 16, 2002 | Socorro | LINEAR | H | 660 m | MPC · JPL |
| 156630 | 2002 HM_{9} | — | April 16, 2002 | Socorro | LINEAR | · | 4.9 km | MPC · JPL |
| 156631 Margitan | 2002 JM_{8} | Margitan | May 6, 2002 | Palomar | NEAT | TIR | 6.0 km | MPC · JPL |
| 156632 | 2002 JK_{11} | — | May 2, 2002 | Anderson Mesa | LONEOS | · | 5.3 km | MPC · JPL |
| 156633 | 2002 JP_{11} | — | May 6, 2002 | Anderson Mesa | LONEOS | · | 4.4 km | MPC · JPL |
| 156634 | 2002 JW_{13} | — | May 8, 2002 | Socorro | LINEAR | H | 1.2 km | MPC · JPL |
| 156635 | 2002 JJ_{20} | — | May 6, 2002 | Palomar | NEAT | · | 6.4 km | MPC · JPL |
| 156636 | 2002 JX_{21} | — | May 9, 2002 | Desert Eagle | W. K. Y. Yeung | · | 6.4 km | MPC · JPL |
| 156637 | 2002 JR_{22} | — | May 8, 2002 | Socorro | LINEAR | EOS | 3.8 km | MPC · JPL |
| 156638 | 2002 JQ_{25} | — | May 8, 2002 | Socorro | LINEAR | EOS | 3.7 km | MPC · JPL |
| 156639 | 2002 JV_{25} | — | May 8, 2002 | Socorro | LINEAR | · | 3.8 km | MPC · JPL |
| 156640 | 2002 JU_{28} | — | May 9, 2002 | Socorro | LINEAR | · | 5.8 km | MPC · JPL |
| 156641 | 2002 JN_{29} | — | May 9, 2002 | Socorro | LINEAR | EOS | 3.7 km | MPC · JPL |
| 156642 | 2002 JH_{31} | — | May 9, 2002 | Socorro | LINEAR | · | 6.9 km | MPC · JPL |
| 156643 | 2002 JK_{32} | — | May 9, 2002 | Socorro | LINEAR | · | 6.3 km | MPC · JPL |
| 156644 | 2002 JJ_{33} | — | May 9, 2002 | Socorro | LINEAR | · | 6.0 km | MPC · JPL |
| 156645 | 2002 JS_{33} | — | May 9, 2002 | Socorro | LINEAR | · | 5.7 km | MPC · JPL |
| 156646 | 2002 JH_{35} | — | May 9, 2002 | Socorro | LINEAR | · | 6.7 km | MPC · JPL |
| 156647 | 2002 JJ_{47} | — | May 9, 2002 | Socorro | LINEAR | · | 3.1 km | MPC · JPL |
| 156648 | 2002 JC_{53} | — | May 9, 2002 | Socorro | LINEAR | EOS | 2.9 km | MPC · JPL |
| 156649 | 2002 JM_{54} | — | May 9, 2002 | Socorro | LINEAR | EOS | 3.6 km | MPC · JPL |
| 156650 | 2002 JQ_{54} | — | May 9, 2002 | Socorro | LINEAR | · | 6.0 km | MPC · JPL |
| 156651 | 2002 JZ_{54} | — | May 9, 2002 | Socorro | LINEAR | · | 5.3 km | MPC · JPL |
| 156652 | 2002 JO_{55} | — | May 9, 2002 | Socorro | LINEAR | · | 4.9 km | MPC · JPL |
| 156653 | 2002 JB_{56} | — | May 9, 2002 | Socorro | LINEAR | · | 4.2 km | MPC · JPL |
| 156654 | 2002 JE_{59} | — | May 9, 2002 | Socorro | LINEAR | · | 3.0 km | MPC · JPL |
| 156655 | 2002 JS_{65} | — | May 9, 2002 | Socorro | LINEAR | H | 890 m | MPC · JPL |
| 156656 | 2002 JL_{69} | — | May 7, 2002 | Socorro | LINEAR | · | 4.3 km | MPC · JPL |
| 156657 | 2002 JD_{70} | — | May 7, 2002 | Socorro | LINEAR | · | 4.9 km | MPC · JPL |
| 156658 | 2002 JM_{71} | — | May 8, 2002 | Socorro | LINEAR | · | 4.2 km | MPC · JPL |
| 156659 | 2002 JO_{76} | — | May 11, 2002 | Socorro | LINEAR | · | 2.8 km | MPC · JPL |
| 156660 | 2002 JH_{79} | — | May 11, 2002 | Socorro | LINEAR | · | 4.8 km | MPC · JPL |
| 156661 | 2002 JK_{80} | — | May 11, 2002 | Socorro | LINEAR | EOS | 2.6 km | MPC · JPL |
| 156662 | 2002 JB_{92} | — | May 11, 2002 | Socorro | LINEAR | KOR | 2.4 km | MPC · JPL |
| 156663 | 2002 JQ_{94} | — | May 11, 2002 | Socorro | LINEAR | · | 3.1 km | MPC · JPL |
| 156664 | 2002 JQ_{98} | — | May 13, 2002 | Socorro | LINEAR | · | 2.2 km | MPC · JPL |
| 156665 | 2002 JM_{101} | — | May 9, 2002 | Socorro | LINEAR | · | 3.7 km | MPC · JPL |
| 156666 | 2002 JB_{102} | — | May 9, 2002 | Socorro | LINEAR | · | 6.7 km | MPC · JPL |
| 156667 | 2002 JV_{102} | — | May 9, 2002 | Socorro | LINEAR | · | 6.4 km | MPC · JPL |
| 156668 | 2002 JT_{103} | — | May 10, 2002 | Socorro | LINEAR | · | 3.8 km | MPC · JPL |
| 156669 | 2002 JY_{108} | — | May 6, 2002 | Socorro | LINEAR | H | 710 m | MPC · JPL |
| 156670 | 2002 JK_{111} | — | May 11, 2002 | Socorro | LINEAR | LIX | 6.3 km | MPC · JPL |
| 156671 | 2002 JY_{114} | — | May 13, 2002 | Socorro | LINEAR | TIR | 5.9 km | MPC · JPL |
| 156672 | 2002 JF_{115} | — | May 14, 2002 | Socorro | LINEAR | · | 5.0 km | MPC · JPL |
| 156673 | 2002 JO_{115} | — | May 15, 2002 | Haleakala | NEAT | EMA | 5.6 km | MPC · JPL |
| 156674 | 2002 JG_{116} | — | May 15, 2002 | Socorro | LINEAR | · | 6.2 km | MPC · JPL |
| 156675 | 2002 JL_{121} | — | May 5, 2002 | Palomar | NEAT | · | 5.9 km | MPC · JPL |
| 156676 | 2002 JL_{123} | — | May 6, 2002 | Palomar | NEAT | EOS | 2.9 km | MPC · JPL |
| 156677 | 2002 JP_{127} | — | May 7, 2002 | Palomar | NEAT | · | 4.7 km | MPC · JPL |
| 156678 | 2002 JO_{128} | — | May 7, 2002 | Palomar | NEAT | · | 4.0 km | MPC · JPL |
| 156679 | 2002 JF_{130} | — | May 8, 2002 | Socorro | LINEAR | · | 4.6 km | MPC · JPL |
| 156680 | 2002 JO_{140} | — | May 10, 2002 | Kitt Peak | Spacewatch | KOR | 2.5 km | MPC · JPL |
| 156681 | 2002 JR_{141} | — | May 11, 2002 | Socorro | LINEAR | · | 4.1 km | MPC · JPL |
| 156682 | 2002 JT_{141} | — | May 11, 2002 | Socorro | LINEAR | · | 3.4 km | MPC · JPL |
| 156683 | 2002 JH_{142} | — | May 11, 2002 | Socorro | LINEAR | EOS | 3.5 km | MPC · JPL |
| 156684 | 2002 JG_{144} | — | May 13, 2002 | Palomar | NEAT | H | 950 m | MPC · JPL |
| 156685 | 2002 KD_{1} | — | May 17, 2002 | Socorro | LINEAR | EUP | 7.9 km | MPC · JPL |
| 156686 | 2002 KW_{3} | — | May 18, 2002 | Socorro | LINEAR | H | 900 m | MPC · JPL |
| 156687 | 2002 KX_{10} | — | May 16, 2002 | Socorro | LINEAR | · | 6.3 km | MPC · JPL |
| 156688 | 2002 KD_{13} | — | May 18, 2002 | Palomar | NEAT | · | 3.4 km | MPC · JPL |
| 156689 | 2002 LQ | — | June 2, 2002 | Socorro | LINEAR | EUP | 6.2 km | MPC · JPL |
| 156690 | 2002 LK_{2} | — | June 2, 2002 | Kitt Peak | Spacewatch | · | 4.9 km | MPC · JPL |
| 156691 | 2002 LR_{5} | — | June 2, 2002 | Socorro | LINEAR | · | 7.3 km | MPC · JPL |
| 156692 | 2002 LV_{8} | — | June 5, 2002 | Socorro | LINEAR | · | 4.6 km | MPC · JPL |
| 156693 | 2002 LN_{11} | — | June 5, 2002 | Socorro | LINEAR | · | 6.8 km | MPC · JPL |
| 156694 | 2002 LF_{15} | — | June 6, 2002 | Socorro | LINEAR | · | 5.9 km | MPC · JPL |
| 156695 | 2002 LW_{15} | — | June 6, 2002 | Socorro | LINEAR | TIR | 5.5 km | MPC · JPL |
| 156696 | 2002 LD_{16} | — | June 6, 2002 | Socorro | LINEAR | · | 4.2 km | MPC · JPL |
| 156697 | 2002 LU_{19} | — | June 6, 2002 | Socorro | LINEAR | · | 1.4 km | MPC · JPL |
| 156698 | 2002 LR_{21} | — | June 7, 2002 | Socorro | LINEAR | · | 5.8 km | MPC · JPL |
| 156699 | 2002 LY_{34} | — | June 9, 2002 | Palomar | NEAT | · | 5.8 km | MPC · JPL |
| 156700 | 2002 LQ_{39} | — | June 10, 2002 | Socorro | LINEAR | EOS | 3.8 km | MPC · JPL |

== 156701–156800 ==
back to top

| Designation | | | Discovery | | | Properties | | Ref |
| Permanent | Provisional | Named after | Date | Site | Discoverer(s) | Category | Diam. | Ref |
|---|---|---|---|---|---|---|---|---|
| 156701 | 2002 LH_{45} | — | June 5, 2002 | Palomar | NEAT | · | 4.7 km | MPC · JPL |
| 156702 | 2002 LZ_{46} | — | June 15, 2002 | Socorro | LINEAR | H | 840 m | MPC · JPL |
| 156703 | 2002 LF_{47} | — | June 14, 2002 | Kingsnake | J. V. McClusky | · | 8.6 km | MPC · JPL |
| 156704 | 2002 LQ_{49} | — | June 8, 2002 | Palomar | NEAT | HYG | 4.7 km | MPC · JPL |
| 156705 | 2002 LN_{52} | — | June 9, 2002 | Haleakala | NEAT | · | 5.9 km | MPC · JPL |
| 156706 | 2002 LE_{56} | — | June 15, 2002 | Socorro | LINEAR | · | 5.9 km | MPC · JPL |
| 156707 | 2002 LW_{59} | — | June 9, 2002 | Socorro | LINEAR | · | 4.7 km | MPC · JPL |
| 156708 | 2002 LD_{61} | — | June 11, 2002 | Palomar | NEAT | · | 4.5 km | MPC · JPL |
| 156709 | 2002 NZ_{3} | — | July 1, 2002 | Palomar | NEAT | · | 5.1 km | MPC · JPL |
| 156710 | 2002 NA_{41} | — | July 9, 2002 | Palomar | NEAT | H | 780 m | MPC · JPL |
| 156711 | 2002 NB_{46} | — | July 13, 2002 | Palomar | NEAT | · | 5.5 km | MPC · JPL |
| 156712 | 2002 NR_{47} | — | July 14, 2002 | Socorro | LINEAR | HYG | 4.5 km | MPC · JPL |
| 156713 | 2002 OW_{11} | — | July 18, 2002 | Socorro | LINEAR | · | 8.4 km | MPC · JPL |
| 156714 | 2002 PF_{1} | — | August 1, 2002 | Socorro | LINEAR | H | 930 m | MPC · JPL |
| 156715 | 2002 PP_{137} | — | August 15, 2002 | Socorro | LINEAR | · | 1.1 km | MPC · JPL |
| 156716 | 2002 RK_{27} | — | September 4, 2002 | Anderson Mesa | LONEOS | · | 970 m | MPC · JPL |
| 156717 | 2002 RT_{42} | — | September 5, 2002 | Socorro | LINEAR | 3:2 · SHU | 6.4 km | MPC · JPL |
| 156718 | 2002 TZ_{6} | — | October 1, 2002 | Socorro | LINEAR | · | 1.0 km | MPC · JPL |
| 156719 | 2002 TR_{49} | — | October 2, 2002 | Socorro | LINEAR | · | 980 m | MPC · JPL |
| 156720 | 2002 TY_{66} | — | October 7, 2002 | Socorro | LINEAR | · | 1.8 km | MPC · JPL |
| 156721 | 2002 TG_{93} | — | October 3, 2002 | Palomar | NEAT | · | 1.8 km | MPC · JPL |
| 156722 | 2002 TR_{203} | — | October 4, 2002 | Socorro | LINEAR | · | 1.5 km | MPC · JPL |
| 156723 | 2002 TQ_{238} | — | October 7, 2002 | Socorro | LINEAR | · | 800 m | MPC · JPL |
| 156724 | 2002 TB_{257} | — | October 9, 2002 | Socorro | LINEAR | · | 1.2 km | MPC · JPL |
| 156725 | 2002 TH_{294} | — | October 11, 2002 | Socorro | LINEAR | · | 2.3 km | MPC · JPL |
| 156726 | 2002 UW_{35} | — | October 31, 2002 | Palomar | NEAT | · | 800 m | MPC · JPL |
| 156727 | 2002 VR_{11} | — | November 1, 2002 | Palomar | NEAT | · | 830 m | MPC · JPL |
| 156728 | 2002 VC_{47} | — | November 5, 2002 | Palomar | NEAT | · | 1.1 km | MPC · JPL |
| 156729 | 2002 VN_{118} | — | November 11, 2002 | Anderson Mesa | LONEOS | · | 1.1 km | MPC · JPL |
| 156730 | 2002 VM_{140} | — | November 13, 2002 | Palomar | NEAT | L5 | 10 km | MPC · JPL |
| 156731 | 2002 XF_{9} | — | December 2, 2002 | Socorro | LINEAR | · | 970 m | MPC · JPL |
| 156732 | 2002 XU_{19} | — | December 2, 2002 | Socorro | LINEAR | · | 1.3 km | MPC · JPL |
| 156733 | 2002 XO_{29} | — | December 5, 2002 | Palomar | NEAT | · | 1.3 km | MPC · JPL |
| 156734 | 2002 XN_{32} | — | December 6, 2002 | Socorro | LINEAR | · | 1.5 km | MPC · JPL |
| 156735 | 2002 XE_{40} | — | December 7, 2002 | Needville | Needville | · | 1.7 km | MPC · JPL |
| 156736 | 2002 XW_{45} | — | December 10, 2002 | Socorro | LINEAR | · | 1.8 km | MPC · JPL |
| 156737 | 2002 XD_{54} | — | December 10, 2002 | Palomar | NEAT | · | 1.3 km | MPC · JPL |
| 156738 | 2002 XS_{57} | — | December 10, 2002 | Palomar | NEAT | · | 1.5 km | MPC · JPL |
| 156739 | 2002 XA_{59} | — | December 11, 2002 | Socorro | LINEAR | · | 4.5 km | MPC · JPL |
| 156740 | 2002 XG_{64} | — | December 11, 2002 | Socorro | LINEAR | · | 1.3 km | MPC · JPL |
| 156741 | 2002 XQ_{64} | — | December 11, 2002 | Socorro | LINEAR | · | 2.5 km | MPC · JPL |
| 156742 | 2002 XJ_{71} | — | December 10, 2002 | Socorro | LINEAR | · | 1.5 km | MPC · JPL |
| 156743 | 2002 XM_{75} | — | December 11, 2002 | Socorro | LINEAR | NYS | 1.7 km | MPC · JPL |
| 156744 | 2002 XP_{80} | — | December 11, 2002 | Socorro | LINEAR | · | 1.4 km | MPC · JPL |
| 156745 | 2002 XH_{81} | — | December 11, 2002 | Socorro | LINEAR | · | 1.5 km | MPC · JPL |
| 156746 | 2002 XM_{81} | — | December 11, 2002 | Socorro | LINEAR | · | 1.6 km | MPC · JPL |
| 156747 | 2002 XH_{84} | — | December 14, 2002 | Socorro | LINEAR | · | 1.2 km | MPC · JPL |
| 156748 | 2002 XQ_{86} | — | December 11, 2002 | Socorro | LINEAR | · | 1.3 km | MPC · JPL |
| 156749 | 2002 XS_{86} | — | December 11, 2002 | Socorro | LINEAR | · | 1.0 km | MPC · JPL |
| 156750 | 2002 XW_{90} | — | December 15, 2002 | Haleakala | NEAT | · | 1.9 km | MPC · JPL |
| 156751 Chelseaferrell | 2002 XL_{92} | Chelseaferrell | December 4, 2002 | Kitt Peak | M. W. Buie | · | 1.1 km | MPC · JPL |
| 156752 | 2002 XL_{96} | — | December 5, 2002 | Socorro | LINEAR | MAS | 1.1 km | MPC · JPL |
| 156753 | 2002 YW | — | December 27, 2002 | Anderson Mesa | LONEOS | · | 1.6 km | MPC · JPL |
| 156754 | 2002 YR_{1} | — | December 27, 2002 | Anderson Mesa | LONEOS | · | 1.5 km | MPC · JPL |
| 156755 | 2002 YH_{7} | — | December 28, 2002 | Anderson Mesa | LONEOS | · | 2.0 km | MPC · JPL |
| 156756 | 2002 YL_{7} | — | December 31, 2002 | Socorro | LINEAR | · | 1.1 km | MPC · JPL |
| 156757 | 2002 YA_{8} | — | December 28, 2002 | Anderson Mesa | LONEOS | ERI | 2.4 km | MPC · JPL |
| 156758 | 2002 YS_{21} | — | December 31, 2002 | Socorro | LINEAR | · | 2.9 km | MPC · JPL |
| 156759 | 2002 YU_{28} | — | December 31, 2002 | Socorro | LINEAR | · | 2.9 km | MPC · JPL |
| 156760 | 2002 YV_{28} | — | December 31, 2002 | Socorro | LINEAR | · | 1.7 km | MPC · JPL |
| 156761 | 2002 YA_{31} | — | December 31, 2002 | Socorro | LINEAR | · | 1.2 km | MPC · JPL |
| 156762 | 2002 YR_{34} | — | December 31, 2002 | Socorro | LINEAR | V | 1.0 km | MPC · JPL |
| 156763 | 2003 AF_{6} | — | January 1, 2003 | Socorro | LINEAR | · | 1.4 km | MPC · JPL |
| 156764 | 2003 AN_{13} | — | January 1, 2003 | Socorro | LINEAR | · | 1.5 km | MPC · JPL |
| 156765 | 2003 AZ_{28} | — | January 4, 2003 | Socorro | LINEAR | NYS | 1.7 km | MPC · JPL |
| 156766 | 2003 AE_{31} | — | January 4, 2003 | Socorro | LINEAR | NYS | 2.0 km | MPC · JPL |
| 156767 | 2003 AH_{32} | — | January 5, 2003 | Socorro | LINEAR | NYS | 1.9 km | MPC · JPL |
| 156768 | 2003 AW_{34} | — | January 7, 2003 | Socorro | LINEAR | · | 1.1 km | MPC · JPL |
| 156769 | 2003 AJ_{39} | — | January 7, 2003 | Socorro | LINEAR | · | 1.6 km | MPC · JPL |
| 156770 | 2003 AN_{43} | — | January 5, 2003 | Socorro | LINEAR | · | 1.4 km | MPC · JPL |
| 156771 | 2003 AP_{47} | — | January 5, 2003 | Socorro | LINEAR | · | 1.4 km | MPC · JPL |
| 156772 | 2003 AX_{54} | — | January 5, 2003 | Socorro | LINEAR | · | 1.2 km | MPC · JPL |
| 156773 | 2003 AY_{54} | — | January 5, 2003 | Socorro | LINEAR | · | 1.4 km | MPC · JPL |
| 156774 | 2003 AL_{59} | — | January 5, 2003 | Socorro | LINEAR | · | 1.5 km | MPC · JPL |
| 156775 | 2003 AU_{60} | — | January 7, 2003 | Socorro | LINEAR | (2076) | 1.9 km | MPC · JPL |
| 156776 | 2003 AO_{65} | — | January 7, 2003 | Socorro | LINEAR | · | 1.6 km | MPC · JPL |
| 156777 | 2003 AM_{69} | — | January 7, 2003 | Socorro | LINEAR | · | 1.7 km | MPC · JPL |
| 156778 | 2003 AB_{73} | — | January 10, 2003 | Socorro | LINEAR | · | 1.4 km | MPC · JPL |
| 156779 | 2003 AA_{76} | — | January 10, 2003 | Socorro | LINEAR | · | 2.3 km | MPC · JPL |
| 156780 | 2003 AV_{78} | — | January 10, 2003 | Kitt Peak | Spacewatch | NYS · | 3.0 km | MPC · JPL |
| 156781 | 2003 AE_{84} | — | January 15, 2003 | Palomar | NEAT | · | 1.5 km | MPC · JPL |
| 156782 | 2003 AR_{87} | — | January 1, 2003 | Socorro | LINEAR | · | 1.4 km | MPC · JPL |
| 156783 | 2003 AB_{90} | — | January 4, 2003 | Socorro | LINEAR | · | 3.5 km | MPC · JPL |
| 156784 | 2003 AJ_{94} | — | January 10, 2003 | Socorro | LINEAR | · | 2.4 km | MPC · JPL |
| 156785 | 2003 BH_{3} | — | January 24, 2003 | La Silla | A. Boattini, H. Scholl | · | 1.5 km | MPC · JPL |
| 156786 | 2003 BW_{7} | — | January 26, 2003 | Kitt Peak | Spacewatch | · | 1.4 km | MPC · JPL |
| 156787 | 2003 BY_{8} | — | January 26, 2003 | Anderson Mesa | LONEOS | · | 2.5 km | MPC · JPL |
| 156788 | 2003 BG_{11} | — | January 26, 2003 | Anderson Mesa | LONEOS | · | 2.4 km | MPC · JPL |
| 156789 | 2003 BC_{12} | — | January 26, 2003 | Anderson Mesa | LONEOS | · | 2.1 km | MPC · JPL |
| 156790 | 2003 BY_{12} | — | January 26, 2003 | Anderson Mesa | LONEOS | · | 1.8 km | MPC · JPL |
| 156791 | 2003 BP_{14} | — | January 26, 2003 | Haleakala | NEAT | · | 1.7 km | MPC · JPL |
| 156792 | 2003 BV_{14} | — | January 26, 2003 | Haleakala | NEAT | · | 1.4 km | MPC · JPL |
| 156793 | 2003 BY_{14} | — | January 26, 2003 | Haleakala | NEAT | NYS | 1.7 km | MPC · JPL |
| 156794 | 2003 BV_{15} | — | January 26, 2003 | Anderson Mesa | LONEOS | · | 2.3 km | MPC · JPL |
| 156795 | 2003 BX_{15} | — | January 26, 2003 | Anderson Mesa | LONEOS | V | 1.2 km | MPC · JPL |
| 156796 | 2003 BZ_{15} | — | January 26, 2003 | Haleakala | NEAT | · | 1.4 km | MPC · JPL |
| 156797 | 2003 BA_{16} | — | January 26, 2003 | Haleakala | NEAT | · | 1.5 km | MPC · JPL |
| 156798 | 2003 BC_{16} | — | January 26, 2003 | Haleakala | NEAT | · | 3.0 km | MPC · JPL |
| 156799 | 2003 BD_{18} | — | January 27, 2003 | Socorro | LINEAR | · | 1.6 km | MPC · JPL |
| 156800 | 2003 BR_{18} | — | January 27, 2003 | Socorro | LINEAR | · | 1.6 km | MPC · JPL |

== 156801–156900 ==
back to top

| Designation | | | Discovery | | | Properties | | Ref |
| Permanent | Provisional | Named after | Date | Site | Discoverer(s) | Category | Diam. | Ref |
|---|---|---|---|---|---|---|---|---|
| 156801 | 2003 BW_{20} | — | January 27, 2003 | Haleakala | NEAT | NYS | 2.2 km | MPC · JPL |
| 156802 | 2003 BL_{25} | — | January 25, 2003 | Palomar | NEAT | · | 1.7 km | MPC · JPL |
| 156803 | 2003 BY_{26} | — | January 26, 2003 | Anderson Mesa | LONEOS | · | 1.6 km | MPC · JPL |
| 156804 | 2003 BB_{36} | — | January 26, 2003 | Kitt Peak | Spacewatch | · | 1.4 km | MPC · JPL |
| 156805 | 2003 BJ_{40} | — | January 27, 2003 | Haleakala | NEAT | PHO | 2.2 km | MPC · JPL |
| 156806 | 2003 BR_{43} | — | January 27, 2003 | Socorro | LINEAR | · | 2.1 km | MPC · JPL |
| 156807 | 2003 BG_{44} | — | January 27, 2003 | Socorro | LINEAR | · | 1.9 km | MPC · JPL |
| 156808 | 2003 BK_{44} | — | January 27, 2003 | Socorro | LINEAR | · | 1.3 km | MPC · JPL |
| 156809 | 2003 BG_{46} | — | January 27, 2003 | Socorro | LINEAR | · | 1.9 km | MPC · JPL |
| 156810 | 2003 BP_{49} | — | January 27, 2003 | Anderson Mesa | LONEOS | NYS | 1.5 km | MPC · JPL |
| 156811 | 2003 BS_{50} | — | January 27, 2003 | Socorro | LINEAR | NYS | 1.3 km | MPC · JPL |
| 156812 | 2003 BM_{51} | — | January 27, 2003 | Socorro | LINEAR | · | 2.9 km | MPC · JPL |
| 156813 | 2003 BY_{51} | — | January 27, 2003 | Socorro | LINEAR | · | 1.5 km | MPC · JPL |
| 156814 | 2003 BC_{52} | — | January 27, 2003 | Socorro | LINEAR | · | 2.9 km | MPC · JPL |
| 156815 | 2003 BJ_{52} | — | January 27, 2003 | Socorro | LINEAR | NYS · | 2.8 km | MPC · JPL |
| 156816 | 2003 BQ_{52} | — | January 27, 2003 | Socorro | LINEAR | · | 2.2 km | MPC · JPL |
| 156817 | 2003 BV_{54} | — | January 27, 2003 | Palomar | NEAT | · | 1.7 km | MPC · JPL |
| 156818 | 2003 BZ_{54} | — | January 27, 2003 | Palomar | NEAT | NYS | 2.3 km | MPC · JPL |
| 156819 | 2003 BR_{56} | — | January 30, 2003 | Anderson Mesa | LONEOS | MAS | 1.0 km | MPC · JPL |
| 156820 | 2003 BK_{57} | — | January 27, 2003 | Palomar | NEAT | NYS | 1 km | MPC · JPL |
| 156821 | 2003 BM_{57} | — | January 27, 2003 | Socorro | LINEAR | · | 2.1 km | MPC · JPL |
| 156822 | 2003 BT_{60} | — | January 27, 2003 | Palomar | NEAT | NYS | 1.4 km | MPC · JPL |
| 156823 | 2003 BV_{60} | — | January 27, 2003 | Palomar | NEAT | · | 1.9 km | MPC · JPL |
| 156824 | 2003 BX_{61} | — | January 28, 2003 | Kitt Peak | Spacewatch | · | 2.3 km | MPC · JPL |
| 156825 | 2003 BB_{65} | — | January 30, 2003 | Anderson Mesa | LONEOS | · | 1.3 km | MPC · JPL |
| 156826 | 2003 BE_{65} | — | January 30, 2003 | Kitt Peak | Spacewatch | MAS | 960 m | MPC · JPL |
| 156827 | 2003 BH_{66} | — | January 30, 2003 | Anderson Mesa | LONEOS | · | 3.0 km | MPC · JPL |
| 156828 | 2003 BQ_{71} | — | January 28, 2003 | Socorro | LINEAR | · | 2.9 km | MPC · JPL |
| 156829 | 2003 BO_{72} | — | January 28, 2003 | Socorro | LINEAR | BAR | 2.3 km | MPC · JPL |
| 156830 | 2003 BA_{80} | — | January 31, 2003 | Socorro | LINEAR | · | 1.3 km | MPC · JPL |
| 156831 | 2003 BX_{80} | — | January 30, 2003 | Anderson Mesa | LONEOS | · | 3.4 km | MPC · JPL |
| 156832 | 2003 BS_{84} | — | January 30, 2003 | Haleakala | NEAT | (1338) (FLO) | 1.0 km | MPC · JPL |
| 156833 | 2003 BT_{86} | — | January 26, 2003 | Anderson Mesa | LONEOS | · | 1.9 km | MPC · JPL |
| 156834 | 2003 BC_{88} | — | January 27, 2003 | Socorro | LINEAR | MAS | 1.0 km | MPC · JPL |
| 156835 | 2003 BF_{92} | — | January 27, 2003 | Socorro | LINEAR | · | 1.7 km | MPC · JPL |
| 156836 | 2003 CS | — | February 1, 2003 | Socorro | LINEAR | · | 2.3 km | MPC · JPL |
| 156837 | 2003 CV_{1} | — | February 1, 2003 | Socorro | LINEAR | · | 1.5 km | MPC · JPL |
| 156838 | 2003 CW_{1} | — | February 1, 2003 | Socorro | LINEAR | NYS | 1.2 km | MPC · JPL |
| 156839 | 2003 CD_{3} | — | February 2, 2003 | Socorro | LINEAR | · | 2.6 km | MPC · JPL |
| 156840 | 2003 CC_{5} | — | February 1, 2003 | Socorro | LINEAR | · | 2.2 km | MPC · JPL |
| 156841 | 2003 CZ_{6} | — | February 1, 2003 | Socorro | LINEAR | · | 2.6 km | MPC · JPL |
| 156842 | 2003 CA_{7} | — | February 1, 2003 | Socorro | LINEAR | · | 1.6 km | MPC · JPL |
| 156843 | 2003 CN_{7} | — | February 1, 2003 | Socorro | LINEAR | · | 3.3 km | MPC · JPL |
| 156844 | 2003 CS_{7} | — | February 1, 2003 | Socorro | LINEAR | · | 2.0 km | MPC · JPL |
| 156845 | 2003 CR_{8} | — | February 1, 2003 | Haleakala | NEAT | MAS | 1.3 km | MPC · JPL |
| 156846 | 2003 CU_{11} | — | February 1, 2003 | Socorro | LINEAR | NYS | 1.1 km | MPC · JPL |
| 156847 | 2003 CA_{13} | — | February 2, 2003 | Socorro | LINEAR | · | 1.8 km | MPC · JPL |
| 156848 | 2003 CJ_{13} | — | February 4, 2003 | Kitt Peak | Spacewatch | MAS | 900 m | MPC · JPL |
| 156849 | 2003 CB_{14} | — | February 6, 2003 | Kitt Peak | Spacewatch | · | 1.4 km | MPC · JPL |
| 156850 | 2003 CM_{15} | — | February 4, 2003 | Haleakala | NEAT | · | 1.0 km | MPC · JPL |
| 156851 | 2003 CY_{15} | — | February 4, 2003 | Socorro | LINEAR | · | 1.4 km | MPC · JPL |
| 156852 | 2003 CQ_{16} | — | February 8, 2003 | Haleakala | NEAT | · | 2.1 km | MPC · JPL |
| 156853 | 2003 CD_{17} | — | February 7, 2003 | Desert Eagle | W. K. Y. Yeung | · | 1.2 km | MPC · JPL |
| 156854 | 2003 CF_{18} | — | February 8, 2003 | Socorro | LINEAR | · | 2.9 km | MPC · JPL |
| 156855 | 2003 CN_{19} | — | February 10, 2003 | Needville | J. Dellinger | NYS | 1.6 km | MPC · JPL |
| 156856 | 2003 CZ_{19} | — | February 9, 2003 | Palomar | NEAT | · | 1.6 km | MPC · JPL |
| 156857 | 2003 CR_{21} | — | February 1, 2003 | Kitt Peak | Spacewatch | · | 3.2 km | MPC · JPL |
| 156858 | 2003 DN_{3} | — | February 22, 2003 | Palomar | NEAT | EUN | 2.2 km | MPC · JPL |
| 156859 | 2003 DS_{5} | — | February 19, 2003 | Palomar | NEAT | · | 1.6 km | MPC · JPL |
| 156860 | 2003 DG_{8} | — | February 22, 2003 | Palomar | NEAT | · | 3.2 km | MPC · JPL |
| 156861 | 2003 DO_{8} | — | February 22, 2003 | Palomar | NEAT | MAS | 960 m | MPC · JPL |
| 156862 | 2003 DF_{9} | — | February 24, 2003 | Campo Imperatore | CINEOS | · | 1.8 km | MPC · JPL |
| 156863 | 2003 DN_{11} | — | February 25, 2003 | Haleakala | NEAT | MAS | 910 m | MPC · JPL |
| 156864 | 2003 DX_{12} | — | February 26, 2003 | Campo Imperatore | CINEOS | MAS | 1.1 km | MPC · JPL |
| 156865 | 2003 DQ_{13} | — | February 23, 2003 | Haleakala | NEAT | · | 3.0 km | MPC · JPL |
| 156866 | 2003 DB_{15} | — | February 26, 2003 | Črni Vrh | Mikuž, H. | NYS | 2.2 km | MPC · JPL |
| 156867 | 2003 DD_{16} | — | February 27, 2003 | Kleť | Kleť | NYS | 1.4 km | MPC · JPL |
| 156868 | 2003 DK_{16} | — | February 19, 2003 | Palomar | NEAT | · | 1.7 km | MPC · JPL |
| 156869 | 2003 DS_{17} | — | February 23, 2003 | Goodricke-Pigott | Kessel, J. W. | NYS | 2.1 km | MPC · JPL |
| 156870 | 2003 DU_{18} | — | February 21, 2003 | Palomar | NEAT | · | 1.8 km | MPC · JPL |
| 156871 | 2003 DF_{19} | — | February 21, 2003 | Palomar | NEAT | NYS | 1.7 km | MPC · JPL |
| 156872 | 2003 DS_{19} | — | February 22, 2003 | Palomar | NEAT | (5) | 1.5 km | MPC · JPL |
| 156873 | 2003 DF_{20} | — | February 22, 2003 | Palomar | NEAT | · | 1.8 km | MPC · JPL |
| 156874 | 2003 DG_{20} | — | February 22, 2003 | Palomar | NEAT | · | 2.2 km | MPC · JPL |
| 156875 | 2003 DT_{20} | — | February 22, 2003 | Palomar | NEAT | NYS | 2.0 km | MPC · JPL |
| 156876 | 2003 DW_{20} | — | February 22, 2003 | Palomar | NEAT | MAS | 1.0 km | MPC · JPL |
| 156877 | 2003 DZ_{21} | — | February 28, 2003 | Socorro | LINEAR | · | 2.7 km | MPC · JPL |
| 156878 | 2003 EF_{1} | — | March 5, 2003 | Socorro | LINEAR | PHO | 2.4 km | MPC · JPL |
| 156879 Eloïs | 2003 EQ_{1} | Eloïs | March 4, 2003 | Saint-Véran | St. Veran | · | 2.9 km | MPC · JPL |
| 156880 Bernardtregon | 2003 ES_{1} | Bernardtregon | March 4, 2003 | Saint-Véran | St. Veran | · | 1.7 km | MPC · JPL |
| 156881 | 2003 EK_{2} | — | March 5, 2003 | Socorro | LINEAR | · | 1.5 km | MPC · JPL |
| 156882 | 2003 EH_{3} | — | March 6, 2003 | Socorro | LINEAR | · | 1.6 km | MPC · JPL |
| 156883 | 2003 EG_{4} | — | March 6, 2003 | Desert Eagle | W. K. Y. Yeung | · | 2.8 km | MPC · JPL |
| 156884 | 2003 EE_{9} | — | March 6, 2003 | Socorro | LINEAR | · | 2.4 km | MPC · JPL |
| 156885 | 2003 EL_{9} | — | March 6, 2003 | Anderson Mesa | LONEOS | · | 2.5 km | MPC · JPL |
| 156886 | 2003 EW_{11} | — | March 6, 2003 | Socorro | LINEAR | · | 2.2 km | MPC · JPL |
| 156887 | 2003 EO_{13} | — | March 6, 2003 | Palomar | NEAT | · | 1.9 km | MPC · JPL |
| 156888 | 2003 EN_{15} | — | March 7, 2003 | Socorro | LINEAR | V | 1.1 km | MPC · JPL |
| 156889 | 2003 EH_{20} | — | March 6, 2003 | Anderson Mesa | LONEOS | MAS | 1.0 km | MPC · JPL |
| 156890 | 2003 ES_{21} | — | March 6, 2003 | Socorro | LINEAR | · | 2.0 km | MPC · JPL |
| 156891 | 2003 EY_{21} | — | March 6, 2003 | Socorro | LINEAR | · | 1.8 km | MPC · JPL |
| 156892 | 2003 EK_{22} | — | March 6, 2003 | Socorro | LINEAR | NYS | 2.3 km | MPC · JPL |
| 156893 | 2003 EL_{22} | — | March 6, 2003 | Socorro | LINEAR | NYS | 2.0 km | MPC · JPL |
| 156894 | 2003 ED_{24} | — | March 6, 2003 | Socorro | LINEAR | · | 1.5 km | MPC · JPL |
| 156895 | 2003 EX_{24} | — | March 6, 2003 | Anderson Mesa | LONEOS | PHO | 4.1 km | MPC · JPL |
| 156896 | 2003 EN_{26} | — | March 6, 2003 | Anderson Mesa | LONEOS | NYS | 1.9 km | MPC · JPL |
| 156897 | 2003 EY_{26} | — | March 6, 2003 | Anderson Mesa | LONEOS | · | 2.3 km | MPC · JPL |
| 156898 | 2003 EX_{29} | — | March 6, 2003 | Palomar | NEAT | · | 1.1 km | MPC · JPL |
| 156899 | 2003 EK_{30} | — | March 6, 2003 | Palomar | NEAT | NYS | 1.7 km | MPC · JPL |
| 156900 | 2003 EN_{30} | — | March 6, 2003 | Palomar | NEAT | MAS | 910 m | MPC · JPL |

== 156901–157000 ==
back to top

| Designation | | | Discovery | | | Properties | | Ref |
| Permanent | Provisional | Named after | Date | Site | Discoverer(s) | Category | Diam. | Ref |
|---|---|---|---|---|---|---|---|---|
| 156901 | 2003 EK_{31} | — | March 7, 2003 | Anderson Mesa | LONEOS | · | 2.1 km | MPC · JPL |
| 156902 | 2003 EQ_{31} | — | March 7, 2003 | Socorro | LINEAR | · | 2.6 km | MPC · JPL |
| 156903 | 2003 EC_{32} | — | March 7, 2003 | Socorro | LINEAR | V | 1.4 km | MPC · JPL |
| 156904 | 2003 EO_{32} | — | March 7, 2003 | Anderson Mesa | LONEOS | · | 1.9 km | MPC · JPL |
| 156905 | 2003 EA_{33} | — | March 7, 2003 | Anderson Mesa | LONEOS | · | 1.6 km | MPC · JPL |
| 156906 | 2003 ES_{38} | — | March 8, 2003 | Anderson Mesa | LONEOS | · | 2.1 km | MPC · JPL |
| 156907 | 2003 EO_{39} | — | March 8, 2003 | Socorro | LINEAR | PHO | 3.4 km | MPC · JPL |
| 156908 | 2003 EG_{41} | — | March 9, 2003 | Socorro | LINEAR | · | 1.5 km | MPC · JPL |
| 156909 | 2003 EP_{52} | — | March 8, 2003 | Socorro | LINEAR | · | 2.4 km | MPC · JPL |
| 156910 | 2003 FB_{6} | — | March 26, 2003 | Campo Imperatore | CINEOS | EUN | 1.7 km | MPC · JPL |
| 156911 | 2003 FD_{11} | — | March 23, 2003 | Kitt Peak | Spacewatch | · | 2.0 km | MPC · JPL |
| 156912 | 2003 FS_{25} | — | March 24, 2003 | Kitt Peak | Spacewatch | MAS | 1.3 km | MPC · JPL |
| 156913 | 2003 FN_{28} | — | March 24, 2003 | Haleakala | NEAT | · | 1.9 km | MPC · JPL |
| 156914 | 2003 FB_{31} | — | March 23, 2003 | Palomar | NEAT | · | 2.0 km | MPC · JPL |
| 156915 | 2003 FK_{36} | — | March 23, 2003 | Kitt Peak | Spacewatch | · | 1.8 km | MPC · JPL |
| 156916 | 2003 FJ_{40} | — | March 24, 2003 | Kitt Peak | Spacewatch | · | 1.9 km | MPC · JPL |
| 156917 | 2003 FE_{44} | — | March 23, 2003 | Kitt Peak | Spacewatch | · | 1.9 km | MPC · JPL |
| 156918 | 2003 FC_{50} | — | March 24, 2003 | Haleakala | NEAT | · | 2.0 km | MPC · JPL |
| 156919 | 2003 FY_{51} | — | March 25, 2003 | Palomar | NEAT | V | 1.1 km | MPC · JPL |
| 156920 | 2003 FS_{55} | — | March 26, 2003 | Palomar | NEAT | NYS | 1.3 km | MPC · JPL |
| 156921 | 2003 FT_{56} | — | March 26, 2003 | Palomar | NEAT | NYS | 1.6 km | MPC · JPL |
| 156922 | 2003 FD_{58} | — | March 26, 2003 | Palomar | NEAT | MAS | 1.1 km | MPC · JPL |
| 156923 | 2003 FT_{58} | — | March 26, 2003 | Palomar | NEAT | · | 2.3 km | MPC · JPL |
| 156924 | 2003 FC_{59} | — | March 26, 2003 | Palomar | NEAT | · | 1.8 km | MPC · JPL |
| 156925 | 2003 FJ_{60} | — | March 26, 2003 | Palomar | NEAT | · | 2.2 km | MPC · JPL |
| 156926 | 2003 FQ_{61} | — | March 26, 2003 | Kitt Peak | Spacewatch | MAS | 1.3 km | MPC · JPL |
| 156927 | 2003 FL_{63} | — | March 26, 2003 | Palomar | NEAT | NYS | 1.8 km | MPC · JPL |
| 156928 | 2003 FW_{71} | — | March 26, 2003 | Haleakala | NEAT | NYS | 1.6 km | MPC · JPL |
| 156929 | 2003 FL_{73} | — | March 26, 2003 | Palomar | NEAT | · | 1.9 km | MPC · JPL |
| 156930 | 2003 FZ_{74} | — | March 26, 2003 | Palomar | NEAT | · | 2.4 km | MPC · JPL |
| 156931 | 2003 FU_{83} | — | March 27, 2003 | Palomar | NEAT | · | 3.4 km | MPC · JPL |
| 156932 | 2003 FZ_{87} | — | March 28, 2003 | Kitt Peak | Spacewatch | · | 2.4 km | MPC · JPL |
| 156933 | 2003 FM_{96} | — | March 30, 2003 | Kitt Peak | Spacewatch | · | 3.4 km | MPC · JPL |
| 156934 | 2003 FU_{97} | — | March 30, 2003 | Anderson Mesa | LONEOS | · | 4.2 km | MPC · JPL |
| 156935 | 2003 FX_{103} | — | March 24, 2003 | Kitt Peak | Spacewatch | · | 1.8 km | MPC · JPL |
| 156936 | 2003 FN_{111} | — | March 31, 2003 | Socorro | LINEAR | · | 2.5 km | MPC · JPL |
| 156937 | 2003 FU_{112} | — | March 30, 2003 | Socorro | LINEAR | · | 2.3 km | MPC · JPL |
| 156938 | 2003 FQ_{118} | — | March 26, 2003 | Anderson Mesa | LONEOS | MAS | 1.2 km | MPC · JPL |
| 156939 Odegard | 2003 FB_{120} | Odegard | March 24, 2003 | Goodricke-Pigott | Reddy, V. | · | 2.3 km | MPC · JPL |
| 156940 | 2003 FA_{121} | — | March 25, 2003 | Anderson Mesa | LONEOS | · | 1.8 km | MPC · JPL |
| 156941 | 2003 GY_{1} | — | April 2, 2003 | Haleakala | NEAT | · | 2.6 km | MPC · JPL |
| 156942 | 2003 GB_{3} | — | April 1, 2003 | Socorro | LINEAR | · | 2.8 km | MPC · JPL |
| 156943 | 2003 GC_{4} | — | April 1, 2003 | Socorro | LINEAR | NYS | 2.1 km | MPC · JPL |
| 156944 | 2003 GM_{4} | — | April 1, 2003 | Socorro | LINEAR | · | 1.7 km | MPC · JPL |
| 156945 | 2003 GO_{4} | — | April 1, 2003 | Socorro | LINEAR | · | 1.6 km | MPC · JPL |
| 156946 | 2003 GF_{5} | — | April 1, 2003 | Socorro | LINEAR | · | 2.0 km | MPC · JPL |
| 156947 | 2003 GO_{5} | — | April 1, 2003 | Socorro | LINEAR | (5) | 1.8 km | MPC · JPL |
| 156948 | 2003 GG_{15} | — | April 4, 2003 | Kitt Peak | Spacewatch | · | 1.4 km | MPC · JPL |
| 156949 | 2003 GX_{28} | — | April 4, 2003 | Kitt Peak | Spacewatch | · | 2.1 km | MPC · JPL |
| 156950 | 2003 GE_{41} | — | April 9, 2003 | Palomar | NEAT | · | 1.6 km | MPC · JPL |
| 156951 | 2003 GQ_{41} | — | April 9, 2003 | Kitt Peak | Spacewatch | EUN | 2.0 km | MPC · JPL |
| 156952 | 2003 GQ_{50} | — | April 7, 2003 | Socorro | LINEAR | · | 2.0 km | MPC · JPL |
| 156953 | 2003 HD_{12} | — | April 25, 2003 | Anderson Mesa | LONEOS | · | 3.0 km | MPC · JPL |
| 156954 | 2003 HP_{12} | — | April 23, 2003 | Campo Imperatore | CINEOS | · | 3.0 km | MPC · JPL |
| 156955 | 2003 HO_{13} | — | April 24, 2003 | Kitt Peak | Spacewatch | · | 2.1 km | MPC · JPL |
| 156956 | 2003 HE_{15} | — | April 26, 2003 | Haleakala | NEAT | · | 2.1 km | MPC · JPL |
| 156957 | 2003 HY_{20} | — | April 24, 2003 | Anderson Mesa | LONEOS | · | 1.9 km | MPC · JPL |
| 156958 | 2003 HZ_{21} | — | April 27, 2003 | Anderson Mesa | LONEOS | EUN | 1.8 km | MPC · JPL |
| 156959 | 2003 HK_{24} | — | April 28, 2003 | Kitt Peak | Spacewatch | · | 1.9 km | MPC · JPL |
| 156960 | 2003 HM_{24} | — | April 28, 2003 | Haleakala | NEAT | · | 4.5 km | MPC · JPL |
| 156961 | 2003 HM_{27} | — | April 28, 2003 | Socorro | LINEAR | · | 2.3 km | MPC · JPL |
| 156962 | 2003 HL_{29} | — | April 28, 2003 | Anderson Mesa | LONEOS | · | 2.2 km | MPC · JPL |
| 156963 | 2003 HP_{29} | — | April 28, 2003 | Anderson Mesa | LONEOS | · | 5.1 km | MPC · JPL |
| 156964 | 2003 HF_{30} | — | April 28, 2003 | Anderson Mesa | LONEOS | · | 3.7 km | MPC · JPL |
| 156965 | 2003 HE_{32} | — | April 28, 2003 | Kitt Peak | Spacewatch | · | 1.7 km | MPC · JPL |
| 156966 | 2003 HH_{32} | — | April 28, 2003 | Anderson Mesa | LONEOS | · | 3.0 km | MPC · JPL |
| 156967 | 2003 HB_{36} | — | April 27, 2003 | Anderson Mesa | LONEOS | (5) | 1.6 km | MPC · JPL |
| 156968 | 2003 HJ_{40} | — | April 29, 2003 | Socorro | LINEAR | · | 2.3 km | MPC · JPL |
| 156969 | 2003 HK_{44} | — | April 27, 2003 | Anderson Mesa | LONEOS | · | 2.3 km | MPC · JPL |
| 156970 | 2003 HY_{44} | — | April 29, 2003 | Anderson Mesa | LONEOS | · | 2.6 km | MPC · JPL |
| 156971 | 2003 HQ_{55} | — | April 29, 2003 | Anderson Mesa | LONEOS | · | 1.3 km | MPC · JPL |
| 156972 | 2003 JY_{3} | — | May 3, 2003 | Reedy Creek | J. Broughton | · | 4.4 km | MPC · JPL |
| 156973 | 2003 JM_{4} | — | May 1, 2003 | Kitt Peak | Spacewatch | · | 1.6 km | MPC · JPL |
| 156974 | 2003 JO_{4} | — | May 1, 2003 | Socorro | LINEAR | · | 1.9 km | MPC · JPL |
| 156975 | 2003 JW_{5} | — | May 1, 2003 | Kitt Peak | Spacewatch | · | 2.0 km | MPC · JPL |
| 156976 | 2003 JH_{7} | — | May 2, 2003 | Socorro | LINEAR | · | 2.1 km | MPC · JPL |
| 156977 | 2003 JV_{10} | — | May 1, 2003 | Pla D'Arguines | R. Ferrando | (5) | 2.4 km | MPC · JPL |
| 156978 | 2003 JT_{12} | — | May 5, 2003 | Kitt Peak | Spacewatch | · | 1.8 km | MPC · JPL |
| 156979 | 2003 JB_{13} | — | May 5, 2003 | Bergisch Gladbach | W. Bickel | MAR | 2.0 km | MPC · JPL |
| 156980 | 2003 JE_{15} | — | May 6, 2003 | Kitt Peak | Spacewatch | · | 1.6 km | MPC · JPL |
| 156981 | 2003 KS_{1} | — | May 22, 2003 | Kitt Peak | Spacewatch | · | 2.5 km | MPC · JPL |
| 156982 | 2003 KD_{2} | — | May 22, 2003 | Kitt Peak | Spacewatch | · | 3.5 km | MPC · JPL |
| 156983 | 2003 KF_{7} | — | May 23, 2003 | Kitt Peak | Spacewatch | · | 2.1 km | MPC · JPL |
| 156984 | 2003 KB_{10} | — | May 26, 2003 | Bohyunsan | Bohyunsan | · | 4.2 km | MPC · JPL |
| 156985 | 2003 KE_{10} | — | May 27, 2003 | Haleakala | NEAT | · | 4.5 km | MPC · JPL |
| 156986 | 2003 KA_{11} | — | May 24, 2003 | Kitt Peak | Spacewatch | · | 2.2 km | MPC · JPL |
| 156987 | 2003 KC_{12} | — | May 27, 2003 | Anderson Mesa | LONEOS | · | 3.7 km | MPC · JPL |
| 156988 | 2003 KE_{12} | — | May 27, 2003 | Anderson Mesa | LONEOS | · | 5.6 km | MPC · JPL |
| 156989 | 2003 KB_{13} | — | May 27, 2003 | Kitt Peak | Spacewatch | (5) | 2.4 km | MPC · JPL |
| 156990 Claerbout | 2003 KX_{18} | Claerbout | May 28, 2003 | Needville | J. Dellinger | HNS | 3.0 km | MPC · JPL |
| 156991 | 2003 LK_{1} | — | June 2, 2003 | Kitt Peak | Spacewatch | · | 2.1 km | MPC · JPL |
| 156992 | 2003 LD_{6} | — | June 7, 2003 | Socorro | LINEAR | BAR | 2.9 km | MPC · JPL |
| 156993 | 2003 ME | — | June 21, 2003 | Socorro | LINEAR | BAR | 3.1 km | MPC · JPL |
| 156994 | 2003 MT_{11} | — | June 27, 2003 | Anderson Mesa | LONEOS | · | 6.2 km | MPC · JPL |
| 156995 | 2003 NM | — | July 1, 2003 | Socorro | LINEAR | EUN | 2.3 km | MPC · JPL |
| 156996 | 2003 OC_{5} | — | July 22, 2003 | Haleakala | NEAT | · | 3.6 km | MPC · JPL |
| 156997 | 2003 OK_{5} | — | July 22, 2003 | Haleakala | NEAT | · | 3.5 km | MPC · JPL |
| 156998 | 2003 ON_{7} | — | July 25, 2003 | Palomar | NEAT | EOS | 3.2 km | MPC · JPL |
| 156999 | 2003 OC_{9} | — | July 23, 2003 | Palomar | NEAT | · | 7.2 km | MPC · JPL |
| 157000 | 2003 OL_{11} | — | July 20, 2003 | Palomar | NEAT | · | 6.6 km | MPC · JPL |

back to top

== See also ==
- Meanings of minor-planet names: 156001–157000
