= Observatory of Saint-Veran =

- Alternative names: Observatoire de Saint-Veran
- Organization: Astroqueyras
- Observatory code: 615
- Location: Saint-Véran, France
- Coordinates: 44°41′56″N 6°54′30″E
- Altitude: 2,930 metres (9,610 ft)
- Established: 1974
- Website: www.astroqueyras.com

Telescopes
- Telescope: 62 cm Cassegrain telescope

Minor planets discovered: 40
see § List of discovered minor planets

The Observatory of Saint-Veran (French: Observatoire de Saint-Véran) is a French astronomical observatory located on the Pic de Château Renard in the municipality of Saint-Véran in the department of Hautes-Alpes in the French Alpes. At 2,930 meter altitude, it is one of the highest observatories in Europe next to the Sphinx Observatory. The Facility is managed by the French amateur astronomy association "AstroQueyras".

The observatory was built in 1974 as a branch of the Paris Observatory. In 1990 amateur astronomers were granted use of its 62 cm Cassegrain telescope.

The main-belt asteroid 48159 Saint-Véran was discovered at and named for the observatory and its hosting village. Presumably, it was the first discovery made at the observatory on 16 April 2001, synchronous with 264476 Aepic.

== List of discovered minor planets ==
The Minor Planet Center credits the observatory with the discovery of the following asteroids between 2001 and 2005:

48159 Saint-Véran	16 April 2001	list
72819 Brunet	18 April 2001	list
77441 Jouve	18 April 2001	list
108140 Alir	16 April 2001	list
124104 Balcony	17 April 2001	list
128633 Queyras	8 September 2004	list
145445 Le Floch	2 September 2005	list
149865 Michelhernandez	29 August 2005	list
(152071) 2004 RW_{7}	6 September 2004	list
156879 Eloïs	4 March 2003	list
156880 Bernardtregon	4 March 2003	list
158657 Célian	4 March 2003	list
178830 Anne-Véronique	18 April 2001	list
(181108) 2005 QS_{76}	28 August 2005	list
182262 Solène	17 April 2001	list
(184610) 2005 RN	1 September 2005	list
(186946) 2004 RB_{12}	7 September 2004	list
(197869) 2004 RZ_{7}	6 September 2004	list
(202010) 2004 RE_{12}	8 September 2004	list
211473 Herin	4 March 2003	list
(221044) 2005 QT_{88}	29 August 2005	list
(232409) 2003 EU_{1}	4 March 2003	list
(235014) 2003 ES_{4}	4 March 2003	list
(240285) 2003 ET_{1}	4 March 2003	list
(247709) 2003 EV_{1}	4 March 2003	list

264476 Aepic	16 April 2001	list
(268298) 2005 QW_{88}	30 August 2005	list
(277204) 2005 QV_{88}	30 August 2005	list
(288711) 2004 RG_{12}	8 September 2004	list
(299312) 2005 QN_{84}	30 August 2005	list
(303781) 2005 RP	1 September 2005	list
(308352) 2005 QO_{75}	28 August 2005	list
(312731) 2010 SS_{9}	8 September 2004	list
(323507) 2004 RZ_{11}	7 September 2004	list
(334698) 2003 EZ_{4}	7 March 2003	list
(354515) 2004 RX_{7}	6 September 2004	list
(366842) 2005 QH_{75}	28 August 2005	list
(385637) 2005 QQ_{88}	29 August 2005	list
(461381) 2001 HS	17 April 2001	list
(481006) 2004 RV_{7}	6 September 2004	list

== See also ==
- List of astronomical societies
- List of minor planet discoverers § Discovering dedicated institutions
- List of observatories
