= List of minor planets: 798001–799000 =

The following is a partial list of minor planets, running from minor-planet number 798001 through 799000, inclusive. The primary data for this and other partial lists is based on JPL's "Small-Body Orbital Elements" and data available from the Minor Planet Center. Critical list information is also provided by the MPC, unless otherwise specified from Lowell Observatory. A detailed description of the table's columns and additional sources are given on the main page including a complete list of every page in this series, and a statistical break-up on the dynamical classification of minor planets.

Also see the summary list of all named bodies in numerical and alphabetical order, and the corresponding naming citations for the number range of this particular list. New namings may only be added to this list after official publication, as the preannouncement of names is condemned by the Working Group for Small Bodies Nomenclature of the International Astronomical Union.

Near-Earth obj.	MBA (inner)	MBA (outer)	Centaur
Mars-crosser	MBA (middle)	Jupiter trojan	Trans-Neptunian obj.
Unclassified

== 798001–798100 ==
Designation			Discovery			Properties		Ref
Permanent	Provisional	Named after	Date	Site	Discoverer(s)	Category	Diam.	Ref
798001	2012 BZ_{37}	—	January 19, 2012	Mount Lemmon	Mount Lemmon Survey	·	860 m	MPC · JPL
798002	2012 BZ_{44}	—	February 10, 2008	Kitt Peak	Spacewatch	·	1.3 km	MPC · JPL
798003	2012 BK_{45}	—	January 19, 2012	Mount Lemmon	Mount Lemmon Survey	·	1.4 km	MPC · JPL
798004	2012 BX_{47}	—	January 19, 2012	Haleakala	Pan-STARRS 1	EUN	680 m	MPC · JPL
798005	2012 BY_{60}	—	January 24, 2012	Haleakala	Pan-STARRS 1	H	400 m	MPC · JPL
798006	2012 BC_{61}	—	January 25, 2012	Haleakala	Pan-STARRS 1	H	430 m	MPC · JPL
798007	2012 BZ_{62}	—	January 20, 2012	Mount Lemmon	Mount Lemmon Survey	L4	6.0 km	MPC · JPL
798008	2012 BS_{64}	—	September 22, 2022	Haleakala	Pan-STARRS 2	·	1.0 km	MPC · JPL
798009	2012 BV_{65}	—	January 4, 2012	Mount Lemmon	Mount Lemmon Survey	·	670 m	MPC · JPL
798010	2012 BR_{67}	—	April 12, 2004	Kitt Peak	Spacewatch	·	830 m	MPC · JPL
798011	2012 BF_{72}	—	March 8, 2008	Mount Lemmon	Mount Lemmon Survey	·	780 m	MPC · JPL
798012	2012 BF_{75}	—	December 27, 2011	Mount Lemmon	Mount Lemmon Survey	·	940 m	MPC · JPL
798013	2012 BZ_{81}	—	January 27, 2012	Mount Lemmon	Mount Lemmon Survey	·	840 m	MPC · JPL
798014	2012 BP_{92}	—	January 26, 2012	Haleakala	Pan-STARRS 1	·	960 m	MPC · JPL
798015	2012 BX_{97}	—	January 29, 2012	Haleakala	Pan-STARRS 1	H	420 m	MPC · JPL
798016	2012 BK_{98}	—	January 26, 2012	Mount Lemmon	Mount Lemmon Survey	·	720 m	MPC · JPL
798017	2012 BY_{101}	—	January 30, 2012	Sewanee	D. T. Durig, Z. Liu	·	560 m	MPC · JPL
798018	2012 BW_{107}	—	January 26, 2012	Haleakala	Pan-STARRS 1	·	1.4 km	MPC · JPL
798019	2012 BD_{114}	—	January 27, 2012	Mount Lemmon	Mount Lemmon Survey	·	2.3 km	MPC · JPL
798020	2012 BA_{124}	—	February 21, 2007	Mount Lemmon	Mount Lemmon Survey	H	440 m	MPC · JPL
798021	2012 BS_{124}	—	February 10, 2008	Kitt Peak	Spacewatch	·	860 m	MPC · JPL
798022	2012 BA_{129}	—	January 29, 2012	Haleakala	Pan-STARRS 1	·	1.4 km	MPC · JPL
798023	2012 BL_{133}	—	January 29, 2012	Catalina	CSS	H	410 m	MPC · JPL
798024	2012 BK_{134}	—	January 21, 2012	Kitt Peak	Spacewatch	H	410 m	MPC · JPL
798025	2012 BO_{135}	—	December 29, 2011	Mount Lemmon	Mount Lemmon Survey	·	1.7 km	MPC · JPL
798026	2012 BW_{135}	—	January 19, 2012	Mount Lemmon	Mount Lemmon Survey	·	960 m	MPC · JPL
798027	2012 BX_{137}	—	January 27, 2012	Mount Lemmon	Mount Lemmon Survey	·	850 m	MPC · JPL
798028	2012 BP_{139}	—	January 29, 2012	Haleakala	Pan-STARRS 1	EUP	2.9 km	MPC · JPL
798029	2012 BX_{147}	—	January 27, 2012	Kitt Peak	Spacewatch	·	940 m	MPC · JPL
798030	2012 BP_{153}	—	November 12, 2015	Mount Lemmon	Mount Lemmon Survey	·	1.5 km	MPC · JPL
798031	2012 BC_{156}	—	January 29, 2012	Kitt Peak	Spacewatch	·	1.0 km	MPC · JPL
798032	2012 BB_{159}	—	January 26, 2012	Haleakala	Pan-STARRS 1	·	860 m	MPC · JPL
798033	2012 BD_{159}	—	January 27, 2012	Kitt Peak	Spacewatch	·	1.4 km	MPC · JPL
798034	2012 BG_{162}	—	January 21, 2012	Kitt Peak	Spacewatch	·	2.4 km	MPC · JPL
798035	2012 BC_{164}	—	January 25, 2012	Kitt Peak	Spacewatch	HNS	840 m	MPC · JPL
798036	2012 BJ_{165}	—	January 19, 2012	Kitt Peak	Spacewatch	·	820 m	MPC · JPL
798037	2012 BP_{166}	—	October 12, 2014	Mount Lemmon	Mount Lemmon Survey	EUN	1 km	MPC · JPL
798038	2012 BQ_{166}	—	January 4, 2012	Kitt Peak	Spacewatch	(5)	760 m	MPC · JPL
798039	2012 BM_{167}	—	September 18, 2015	Mount Lemmon	Mount Lemmon Survey	·	2.5 km	MPC · JPL
798040	2012 BD_{168}	—	January 18, 2012	Kitt Peak	Spacewatch	·	1.2 km	MPC · JPL
798041	2012 BT_{169}	—	January 18, 2012	Kitt Peak	Spacewatch	·	1.1 km	MPC · JPL
798042	2012 BQ_{172}	—	January 20, 2012	Kitt Peak	Spacewatch	·	990 m	MPC · JPL
798043	2012 BG_{174}	—	January 27, 2012	Mount Lemmon	Mount Lemmon Survey	·	800 m	MPC · JPL
798044	2012 BU_{174}	—	January 19, 2012	Haleakala	Pan-STARRS 1	·	1.5 km	MPC · JPL
798045	2012 BH_{176}	—	January 19, 2012	Kitt Peak	Spacewatch	·	760 m	MPC · JPL
798046	2012 BP_{178}	—	January 25, 2012	Haleakala	Pan-STARRS 1	EOS	1.4 km	MPC · JPL
798047	2012 BF_{179}	—	January 27, 2012	Mount Lemmon	Mount Lemmon Survey	·	540 m	MPC · JPL
798048	2012 BO_{179}	—	January 30, 2012	Mount Lemmon	Mount Lemmon Survey	EUN	900 m	MPC · JPL
798049	2012 BK_{181}	—	January 30, 2012	Kitt Peak	Spacewatch	·	1.2 km	MPC · JPL
798050	2012 BV_{181}	—	January 20, 2012	Haleakala	Pan-STARRS 1	JUN	620 m	MPC · JPL
798051	2012 BC_{182}	—	January 24, 2012	Haleakala	Pan-STARRS 1	·	1.2 km	MPC · JPL
798052	2012 BF_{182}	—	January 19, 2012	Mount Lemmon	Mount Lemmon Survey	·	1.0 km	MPC · JPL
798053	2012 BZ_{183}	—	January 18, 2012	Mount Lemmon	Mount Lemmon Survey	·	2.5 km	MPC · JPL
798054	2012 BK_{185}	—	January 19, 2012	Haleakala	Pan-STARRS 1	·	1.0 km	MPC · JPL
798055	2012 BY_{188}	—	January 26, 2012	Haleakala	Pan-STARRS 1	·	1.3 km	MPC · JPL
798056	2012 BK_{191}	—	January 26, 2012	Haleakala	Pan-STARRS 1	·	1.4 km	MPC · JPL
798057	2012 BP_{191}	—	January 19, 2012	Kitt Peak	Spacewatch	·	1.2 km	MPC · JPL
798058	2012 BT_{191}	—	April 27, 2017	Haleakala	Pan-STARRS 1	·	1.1 km	MPC · JPL
798059	2012 BF_{192}	—	January 26, 2012	Haleakala	Pan-STARRS 1	L4	5.5 km	MPC · JPL
798060	2012 BP_{193}	—	January 30, 2012	Kitt Peak	Spacewatch	·	1.1 km	MPC · JPL
798061	2012 CP_{1}	—	February 1, 2012	Kitt Peak	Spacewatch	·	930 m	MPC · JPL
798062	2012 CQ_{20}	—	October 31, 2010	Mount Lemmon	Mount Lemmon Survey	KOR	970 m	MPC · JPL
798063	2012 CW_{23}	—	January 21, 2012	Kitt Peak	Spacewatch	JUN	800 m	MPC · JPL
798064	2012 CC_{25}	—	January 19, 2012	Haleakala	Pan-STARRS 1	·	1.2 km	MPC · JPL
798065	2012 CR_{29}	—	February 3, 2012	Haleakala	Pan-STARRS 1	·	940 m	MPC · JPL
798066	2012 CB_{31}	—	February 12, 2012	Mount Lemmon	Mount Lemmon Survey	·	2.4 km	MPC · JPL
798067	2012 CM_{33}	—	February 14, 2012	Haleakala	Pan-STARRS 1	ADE	1.5 km	MPC · JPL
798068	2012 CZ_{33}	—	February 13, 2012	Haleakala	Pan-STARRS 1	H	400 m	MPC · JPL
798069	2012 CS_{49}	—	January 30, 2012	Mount Lemmon	Mount Lemmon Survey	·	2.3 km	MPC · JPL
798070	2012 CN_{56}	—	January 21, 2012	Haleakala	Pan-STARRS 1	·	620 m	MPC · JPL
798071	2012 CH_{58}	—	February 15, 2012	Haleakala	Pan-STARRS 1	THM	1.7 km	MPC · JPL
798072	2012 CK_{58}	—	May 15, 2008	Mount Lemmon	Mount Lemmon Survey	·	1.2 km	MPC · JPL
798073	2012 CL_{58}	—	February 3, 2012	Haleakala	Pan-STARRS 1	·	900 m	MPC · JPL
798074	2012 CH_{60}	—	February 1, 2012	Kitt Peak	Spacewatch	·	490 m	MPC · JPL
798075	2012 CQ_{61}	—	October 8, 2015	Haleakala	Pan-STARRS 1	·	1.4 km	MPC · JPL
798076	2012 CM_{62}	—	February 15, 2012	Haleakala	Pan-STARRS 1	·	1.0 km	MPC · JPL
798077	2012 CC_{64}	—	March 19, 2017	Haleakala	Pan-STARRS 1	·	1.1 km	MPC · JPL
798078	2012 CT_{64}	—	December 18, 2015	Mount Lemmon	Mount Lemmon Survey	·	1.0 km	MPC · JPL
798079	2012 CA_{65}	—	September 9, 2015	Haleakala	Pan-STARRS 1	·	2.3 km	MPC · JPL
798080	2012 CW_{66}	—	February 4, 2012	Haleakala	Pan-STARRS 1	T_{j} (2.97) · 3:2	4.8 km	MPC · JPL
798081	2012 CP_{69}	—	February 14, 2012	Haleakala	Pan-STARRS 1	·	910 m	MPC · JPL
798082	2012 CW_{69}	—	February 14, 2012	Haleakala	Pan-STARRS 1	·	930 m	MPC · JPL
798083	2012 CM_{71}	—	February 15, 2012	Haleakala	Pan-STARRS 1	·	2.4 km	MPC · JPL
798084	2012 CF_{72}	—	February 14, 2012	Haleakala	Pan-STARRS 1	·	860 m	MPC · JPL
798085	2012 CB_{73}	—	February 3, 2012	Haleakala	Pan-STARRS 1	·	1.2 km	MPC · JPL
798086	2012 CA_{74}	—	February 1, 2012	Mount Lemmon	Mount Lemmon Survey	·	1.4 km	MPC · JPL
798087	2012 CR_{74}	—	February 15, 2012	Haleakala	Pan-STARRS 1	HNS	690 m	MPC · JPL
798088	2012 CY_{74}	—	November 11, 2010	Mount Lemmon	Mount Lemmon Survey	·	1.2 km	MPC · JPL
798089	2012 CC_{75}	—	October 3, 2010	Kitt Peak	Spacewatch	·	950 m	MPC · JPL
798090	2012 CZ_{75}	—	February 1, 2012	Mount Lemmon	Mount Lemmon Survey	L4	5.6 km	MPC · JPL
798091	2012 DD_{15}	—	January 18, 2012	Mount Lemmon	Mount Lemmon Survey	(1547)	1.1 km	MPC · JPL
798092	2012 DT_{18}	—	February 23, 2012	Kitt Peak	Spacewatch	EOS	1.5 km	MPC · JPL
798093	2012 DU_{23}	—	February 21, 2012	Kitt Peak	Spacewatch	H	440 m	MPC · JPL
798094	2012 DE_{29}	—	February 22, 2012	Kitt Peak	Spacewatch	·	1.2 km	MPC · JPL
798095	2012 DY_{30}	—	February 24, 2012	Mount Lemmon	Mount Lemmon Survey	H	440 m	MPC · JPL
798096	2012 DM_{31}	—	February 24, 2012	Siding Spring	SSS	H	510 m	MPC · JPL
798097	2012 DU_{31}	—	April 23, 2004	Kitt Peak	Spacewatch	·	1.1 km	MPC · JPL
798098	2012 DJ_{32}	—	February 25, 2012	Kitt Peak	Spacewatch	·	1.1 km	MPC · JPL
798099	2012 DV_{32}	—	February 25, 2012	Kitt Peak	Spacewatch	AMO	160 m	MPC · JPL
798100	2012 DS_{37}	—	January 20, 2012	Kitt Peak	Spacewatch	·	1.2 km	MPC · JPL

== 798101–798200 ==
back to top

Designation			Discovery			Properties		Ref
Permanent	Provisional	Named after	Date	Site	Discoverer(s)	Category	Diam.	Ref
798101	2012 DB_{41}	—	January 19, 2012	Haleakala	Pan-STARRS 1	·	910 m	MPC · JPL
798102	2012 DH_{45}	—	February 25, 2012	Kitt Peak	Spacewatch	JUN	570 m	MPC · JPL
798103	2012 DT_{45}	—	February 26, 2012	Kitt Peak	Spacewatch	·	870 m	MPC · JPL
798104	2012 DV_{45}	—	February 26, 2012	Kitt Peak	Spacewatch	·	1.2 km	MPC · JPL
798105	2012 DJ_{50}	—	April 6, 2008	Kitt Peak	Spacewatch	·	1.1 km	MPC · JPL
798106	2012 DL_{50}	—	February 26, 2012	Kitt Peak	Spacewatch	·	900 m	MPC · JPL
798107	2012 DQ_{54}	—	February 23, 2012	Catalina	CSS	H	490 m	MPC · JPL
798108	2012 DQ_{55}	—	February 22, 2012	Catalina	CSS	H	420 m	MPC · JPL
798109	2012 DQ_{62}	—	February 27, 2012	Haleakala	Pan-STARRS 1	·	460 m	MPC · JPL
798110	2012 DU_{68}	—	February 14, 2012	Haleakala	Pan-STARRS 1	EUN · critical	700 m	MPC · JPL
798111	2012 DN_{70}	—	February 25, 2012	Mount Lemmon	Mount Lemmon Survey	GEF	940 m	MPC · JPL
798112	2012 DO_{73}	—	November 1, 2006	Kitt Peak	Spacewatch	·	970 m	MPC · JPL
798113	2012 DP_{75}	—	May 8, 2008	Kitt Peak	Spacewatch	·	890 m	MPC · JPL
798114	2012 DL_{77}	—	February 21, 2012	Mount Lemmon	Mount Lemmon Survey	H	470 m	MPC · JPL
798115	2012 DW_{80}	—	February 26, 2012	Haleakala	Pan-STARRS 1	·	880 m	MPC · JPL
798116	2012 DB_{81}	—	February 26, 2012	Haleakala	Pan-STARRS 1	EOS	1.4 km	MPC · JPL
798117	2012 DP_{81}	—	February 26, 2012	Haleakala	Pan-STARRS 1	·	1.5 km	MPC · JPL
798118 Todoque	2012 DA_{84}	Todoque	February 26, 2012	Roque de los Muchachos	EURONEAR	KOR	920 m	MPC · JPL
798119	2012 DY_{87}	—	February 21, 2012	Kitt Peak	Spacewatch	(1547)	1.5 km	MPC · JPL
798120	2012 DF_{99}	—	February 19, 2012	Kitt Peak	Spacewatch	H	390 m	MPC · JPL
798121	2012 DH_{99}	—	February 23, 2012	Catalina	CSS	H	470 m	MPC · JPL
798122	2012 DU_{99}	—	February 21, 2012	Kitt Peak	Spacewatch	·	1.0 km	MPC · JPL
798123	2012 DJ_{102}	—	February 21, 2012	Kitt Peak	Spacewatch	·	1.3 km	MPC · JPL
798124	2012 DM_{102}	—	February 21, 2012	Kitt Peak	Spacewatch	·	980 m	MPC · JPL
798125	2012 DS_{102}	—	February 23, 2012	Mount Lemmon	Mount Lemmon Survey	·	1.3 km	MPC · JPL
798126	2012 DY_{102}	—	February 25, 2012	Kitt Peak	Spacewatch	·	1.4 km	MPC · JPL
798127	2012 DA_{103}	—	February 25, 2012	Kitt Peak	Spacewatch	·	2.4 km	MPC · JPL
798128	2012 DV_{105}	—	February 28, 2012	Haleakala	Pan-STARRS 1	ADE	1.2 km	MPC · JPL
798129	2012 DZ_{105}	—	February 19, 2012	Catalina	CSS	H	490 m	MPC · JPL
798130	2012 DJ_{107}	—	February 24, 2012	Haleakala	Pan-STARRS 1	·	1.4 km	MPC · JPL
798131	2012 DW_{107}	—	February 16, 2012	Haleakala	Pan-STARRS 1	·	580 m	MPC · JPL
798132	2012 DQ_{108}	—	February 26, 2012	Haleakala	Pan-STARRS 1	·	1.1 km	MPC · JPL
798133	2012 DT_{108}	—	February 28, 2012	Haleakala	Pan-STARRS 1	·	890 m	MPC · JPL
798134	2012 DD_{110}	—	February 24, 2012	Haleakala	Pan-STARRS 1	·	1.1 km	MPC · JPL
798135	2012 DL_{110}	—	February 19, 2012	Mount Lemmon	Mount Lemmon Survey	MAR	680 m	MPC · JPL
798136	2012 DS_{111}	—	February 27, 2012	Kitt Peak	Spacewatch	BAP	570 m	MPC · JPL
798137	2012 DB_{113}	—	January 19, 2012	Haleakala	Pan-STARRS 1	(5)	850 m	MPC · JPL
798138	2012 DK_{113}	—	February 28, 2012	Haleakala	Pan-STARRS 1	·	1.1 km	MPC · JPL
798139	2012 DG_{114}	—	August 3, 2014	Haleakala	Pan-STARRS 1	·	1.6 km	MPC · JPL
798140	2012 DX_{116}	—	February 28, 2012	Haleakala	Pan-STARRS 1	·	990 m	MPC · JPL
798141	2012 DT_{117}	—	February 28, 2012	Haleakala	Pan-STARRS 1	·	1.2 km	MPC · JPL
798142	2012 DJ_{118}	—	February 28, 2012	Haleakala	Pan-STARRS 1	MAR	740 m	MPC · JPL
798143	2012 DF_{120}	—	February 27, 2012	Haleakala	Pan-STARRS 1	·	710 m	MPC · JPL
798144	2012 DX_{120}	—	February 27, 2012	Haleakala	Pan-STARRS 1	·	1.5 km	MPC · JPL
798145	2012 DX_{122}	—	February 24, 2012	Mount Lemmon	Mount Lemmon Survey	·	1.2 km	MPC · JPL
798146	2012 DG_{123}	—	February 26, 2012	Haleakala	Pan-STARRS 1	·	1.3 km	MPC · JPL
798147	2012 DM_{123}	—	February 23, 2012	Mount Lemmon	Mount Lemmon Survey	·	1.1 km	MPC · JPL
798148	2012 DN_{123}	—	February 27, 2012	Haleakala	Pan-STARRS 1	ADE	1.0 km	MPC · JPL
798149	2012 DR_{123}	—	February 23, 2012	Mount Lemmon	Mount Lemmon Survey	·	1.1 km	MPC · JPL
798150	2012 DY_{123}	—	February 16, 2012	Haleakala	Pan-STARRS 1	EUN	680 m	MPC · JPL
798151	2012 DA_{124}	—	February 23, 2012	Mount Lemmon	Mount Lemmon Survey	·	860 m	MPC · JPL
798152	2012 DB_{124}	—	February 28, 2012	Haleakala	Pan-STARRS 1	·	1.1 km	MPC · JPL
798153	2012 DN_{124}	—	February 25, 2012	Kitt Peak	Spacewatch	·	1.2 km	MPC · JPL
798154	2012 DO_{124}	—	February 27, 2012	Haleakala	Pan-STARRS 1	·	780 m	MPC · JPL
798155	2012 DX_{125}	—	February 24, 2012	Mount Lemmon	Mount Lemmon Survey	·	1.2 km	MPC · JPL
798156	2012 DN_{126}	—	February 16, 2012	Haleakala	Pan-STARRS 1	·	1.1 km	MPC · JPL
798157	2012 DV_{126}	—	February 16, 2012	Haleakala	Pan-STARRS 1	3:2	3.7 km	MPC · JPL
798158	2012 DP_{127}	—	February 28, 2012	Haleakala	Pan-STARRS 1	·	1.1 km	MPC · JPL
798159	2012 DG_{128}	—	February 25, 2012	Mount Lemmon	Mount Lemmon Survey	·	1.1 km	MPC · JPL
798160	2012 DJ_{128}	—	February 27, 2012	Haleakala	Pan-STARRS 1	EOS	1.4 km	MPC · JPL
798161	2012 DP_{129}	—	February 26, 2012	Kitt Peak	Spacewatch	·	1.7 km	MPC · JPL
798162	2012 DB_{130}	—	February 27, 2012	Haleakala	Pan-STARRS 1	·	1.3 km	MPC · JPL
798163	2012 DJ_{130}	—	February 28, 2012	Haleakala	Pan-STARRS 1	KOR	1.0 km	MPC · JPL
798164	2012 DQ_{130}	—	February 27, 2012	Haleakala	Pan-STARRS 1	·	1.0 km	MPC · JPL
798165	2012 DY_{130}	—	February 16, 2012	Haleakala	Pan-STARRS 1	·	2.3 km	MPC · JPL
798166	2012 DA_{132}	—	February 16, 2012	Haleakala	Pan-STARRS 1	·	1.4 km	MPC · JPL
798167	2012 DJ_{133}	—	February 28, 2012	Haleakala	Pan-STARRS 1	HNS	770 m	MPC · JPL
798168	2012 DK_{133}	—	February 25, 2012	Kitt Peak	Spacewatch	·	1.4 km	MPC · JPL
798169	2012 DN_{134}	—	February 25, 2012	Mount Lemmon	Mount Lemmon Survey	·	1.2 km	MPC · JPL
798170	2012 DQ_{134}	—	February 16, 2012	Haleakala	Pan-STARRS 1	·	1.3 km	MPC · JPL
798171	2012 EA_{2}	—	March 1, 2012	Mount Lemmon	Mount Lemmon Survey	APO	520 m	MPC · JPL
798172	2012 EK_{7}	—	March 13, 2012	Mount Lemmon	Mount Lemmon Survey	·	1.3 km	MPC · JPL
798173	2012 ED_{11}	—	February 27, 2012	Haleakala	Pan-STARRS 1	·	1.1 km	MPC · JPL
798174	2012 EP_{17}	—	April 16, 2012	Haleakala	Pan-STARRS 1	H	440 m	MPC · JPL
798175	2012 ET_{20}	—	March 13, 2012	Mount Lemmon	Mount Lemmon Survey	·	1.1 km	MPC · JPL
798176	2012 EM_{23}	—	March 14, 2012	Haleakala	Pan-STARRS 1	H	390 m	MPC · JPL
798177	2012 EA_{25}	—	March 14, 2012	Mount Lemmon	Mount Lemmon Survey	·	930 m	MPC · JPL
798178	2012 EO_{25}	—	March 1, 2012	Mount Lemmon	Mount Lemmon Survey	H	350 m	MPC · JPL
798179	2012 EU_{25}	—	March 2, 2012	Mount Lemmon	Mount Lemmon Survey	·	1.5 km	MPC · JPL
798180	2012 EW_{26}	—	March 15, 2012	Mount Lemmon	Mount Lemmon Survey	·	730 m	MPC · JPL
798181	2012 EB_{28}	—	March 15, 2012	Mount Lemmon	Mount Lemmon Survey	EOS	1.2 km	MPC · JPL
798182	2012 EM_{29}	—	March 15, 2012	Kitt Peak	Spacewatch	·	1.3 km	MPC · JPL
798183	2012 ET_{31}	—	March 1, 2012	Mount Lemmon	Mount Lemmon Survey	·	860 m	MPC · JPL
798184	2012 EF_{32}	—	March 15, 2012	Mount Lemmon	Mount Lemmon Survey	VER	1.9 km	MPC · JPL
798185	2012 EX_{33}	—	March 15, 2012	Mount Lemmon	Mount Lemmon Survey	·	1.1 km	MPC · JPL
798186	2012 FD_{2}	—	February 25, 2012	Mount Lemmon	Mount Lemmon Survey	·	960 m	MPC · JPL
798187	2012 FZ_{4}	—	February 13, 2012	Kitt Peak	Spacewatch	·	1.3 km	MPC · JPL
798188	2012 FG_{5}	—	March 13, 2012	Mount Lemmon	Mount Lemmon Survey	·	540 m	MPC · JPL
798189	2012 FO_{7}	—	February 1, 2012	Kitt Peak	Spacewatch	·	1.0 km	MPC · JPL
798190	2012 FF_{20}	—	March 17, 2012	Mount Lemmon	Mount Lemmon Survey	·	1.0 km	MPC · JPL
798191	2012 FR_{25}	—	February 25, 2012	Kitt Peak	Spacewatch	·	920 m	MPC · JPL
798192	2012 FZ_{35}	—	October 5, 2005	Kitt Peak	Spacewatch	H	390 m	MPC · JPL
798193	2012 FA_{36}	—	February 27, 2012	Haleakala	Pan-STARRS 1	H	370 m	MPC · JPL
798194	2012 FL_{37}	—	March 7, 2003	Saint-Véran	St. Veran	·	1.0 km	MPC · JPL
798195	2012 FN_{37}	—	February 28, 2012	Haleakala	Pan-STARRS 1	EUN	770 m	MPC · JPL
798196	2012 FB_{42}	—	February 28, 2012	Haleakala	Pan-STARRS 1	·	1.1 km	MPC · JPL
798197	2012 FO_{43}	—	March 25, 2012	Mount Lemmon	Mount Lemmon Survey	H	330 m	MPC · JPL
798198	2012 FR_{44}	—	March 26, 2003	Kitt Peak	Spacewatch	·	1.2 km	MPC · JPL
798199	2012 FS_{46}	—	April 6, 2008	Kitt Peak	Spacewatch	·	1.1 km	MPC · JPL
798200	2012 FV_{53}	—	March 22, 2012	Mount Lemmon	Mount Lemmon Survey	·	1.1 km	MPC · JPL

== 798201–798300 ==
back to top

Designation			Discovery			Properties		Ref
Permanent	Provisional	Named after	Date	Site	Discoverer(s)	Category	Diam.	Ref
798201	2012 FK_{54}	—	February 28, 2012	Haleakala	Pan-STARRS 1	·	1.1 km	MPC · JPL
798202	2012 FR_{56}	—	March 5, 2012	Kitt Peak	Spacewatch	·	1 km	MPC · JPL
798203	2012 FJ_{60}	—	March 27, 2012	Mount Lemmon	Mount Lemmon Survey	·	1.2 km	MPC · JPL
798204	2012 FJ_{62}	—	March 28, 2012	Cala d'Hort	B. Linero, I. de la Cueva	·	1.2 km	MPC · JPL
798205	2012 FO_{63}	—	March 27, 2012	Kitt Peak	Spacewatch	H	390 m	MPC · JPL
798206	2012 FC_{64}	—	February 28, 2012	Haleakala	Pan-STARRS 1	·	1.0 km	MPC · JPL
798207	2012 FE_{79}	—	March 16, 2012	Kitt Peak	Spacewatch	·	1.5 km	MPC · JPL
798208	2012 FH_{81}	—	March 3, 2012	Mount Lemmon	Mount Lemmon Survey	·	1.5 km	MPC · JPL
798209	2012 FS_{86}	—	March 31, 2012	Mount Lemmon	Mount Lemmon Survey	·	950 m	MPC · JPL
798210	2012 FJ_{88}	—	March 27, 2012	Kitt Peak	Spacewatch	·	580 m	MPC · JPL
798211	2012 FN_{88}	—	March 29, 2012	Kitt Peak	Spacewatch	·	1.5 km	MPC · JPL
798212	2012 FG_{89}	—	March 29, 2012	Haleakala	Pan-STARRS 1	JUN	710 m	MPC · JPL
798213	2012 FX_{89}	—	September 23, 2008	Catalina	CSS	·	1.1 km	MPC · JPL
798214	2012 FN_{93}	—	March 18, 2018	Haleakala	Pan-STARRS 1	·	2.5 km	MPC · JPL
798215	2012 FA_{94}	—	March 19, 2017	Haleakala	Pan-STARRS 1	·	1.3 km	MPC · JPL
798216	2012 FC_{94}	—	August 21, 2006	Kitt Peak	Spacewatch	·	420 m	MPC · JPL
798217	2012 FZ_{95}	—	March 29, 2012	Kitt Peak	Spacewatch	H	390 m	MPC · JPL
798218	2012 FB_{96}	—	August 2, 2016	Haleakala	Pan-STARRS 1	·	570 m	MPC · JPL
798219	2012 FN_{96}	—	January 16, 2018	Haleakala	Pan-STARRS 1	·	2.8 km	MPC · JPL
798220	2012 FZ_{97}	—	February 5, 2016	Haleakala	Pan-STARRS 1	HNS	800 m	MPC · JPL
798221	2012 FJ_{99}	—	March 30, 2012	Mount Lemmon	Mount Lemmon Survey	·	1.4 km	MPC · JPL
798222	2012 FV_{99}	—	March 23, 2012	Mount Lemmon	Mount Lemmon Survey	·	1.5 km	MPC · JPL
798223	2012 FD_{100}	—	March 27, 2012	Kitt Peak	Spacewatch	·	950 m	MPC · JPL
798224	2012 FP_{100}	—	March 21, 2012	Mount Lemmon	Mount Lemmon Survey	MIS	1.4 km	MPC · JPL
798225	2012 FF_{103}	—	March 23, 2012	Mount Lemmon	Mount Lemmon Survey	THM · critical	1.6 km	MPC · JPL
798226	2012 FD_{104}	—	March 28, 2012	Kitt Peak	Spacewatch	·	1.1 km	MPC · JPL
798227	2012 FQ_{105}	—	March 27, 2012	Kitt Peak	Spacewatch	615	970 m	MPC · JPL
798228	2012 FZ_{105}	—	March 28, 2012	Kitt Peak	Spacewatch	·	1.1 km	MPC · JPL
798229	2012 FE_{106}	—	March 16, 2012	Mount Lemmon	Mount Lemmon Survey	·	1.4 km	MPC · JPL
798230	2012 FG_{106}	—	March 29, 2012	Haleakala	Pan-STARRS 1	·	1.0 km	MPC · JPL
798231	2012 FM_{106}	—	March 27, 2012	Mount Lemmon	Mount Lemmon Survey	·	1.6 km	MPC · JPL
798232	2012 FS_{106}	—	March 24, 2012	Mount Lemmon	Mount Lemmon Survey	·	1.3 km	MPC · JPL
798233	2012 FD_{107}	—	March 29, 2012	Haleakala	Pan-STARRS 1	·	1.2 km	MPC · JPL
798234	2012 FZ_{107}	—	March 29, 2012	Kitt Peak	Spacewatch	·	2.3 km	MPC · JPL
798235	2012 FP_{108}	—	March 23, 2012	Kitt Peak	Spacewatch	EUN	1.1 km	MPC · JPL
798236	2012 FH_{110}	—	March 29, 2012	Haleakala	Pan-STARRS 1	H	410 m	MPC · JPL
798237	2012 FW_{111}	—	March 20, 2012	Haleakala	Pan-STARRS 1	·	1.9 km	MPC · JPL
798238	2012 FU_{113}	—	March 31, 2012	Mount Lemmon	Mount Lemmon Survey	·	1.7 km	MPC · JPL
798239	2012 FU_{114}	—	March 28, 2012	Mount Lemmon	Mount Lemmon Survey	·	960 m	MPC · JPL
798240	2012 FG_{115}	—	April 21, 2018	Mount Lemmon	Mount Lemmon Survey	·	2.1 km	MPC · JPL
798241	2012 FQ_{115}	—	March 31, 2012	Kitt Peak	Spacewatch	·	1.2 km	MPC · JPL
798242	2012 FM_{117}	—	March 31, 2012	Mount Lemmon	Mount Lemmon Survey	·	1.4 km	MPC · JPL
798243	2012 GG	—	March 27, 2012	Mount Lemmon	Mount Lemmon Survey	H	400 m	MPC · JPL
798244	2012 GZ_{2}	—	April 1, 2012	Mount Lemmon	Mount Lemmon Survey	·	1.6 km	MPC · JPL
798245	2012 GW_{7}	—	April 13, 2012	Haleakala	Pan-STARRS 1	·	1.4 km	MPC · JPL
798246	2012 GQ_{17}	—	April 15, 2012	Haleakala	Pan-STARRS 1	JUN	800 m	MPC · JPL
798247	2012 GW_{24}	—	February 25, 2012	Mount Lemmon	Mount Lemmon Survey	·	1.2 km	MPC · JPL
798248	2012 GB_{25}	—	March 28, 2012	Kitt Peak	Spacewatch	·	1.2 km	MPC · JPL
798249	2012 GQ_{28}	—	April 15, 2012	Haleakala	Pan-STARRS 1	·	480 m	MPC · JPL
798250	2012 GP_{32}	—	March 29, 2012	Kitt Peak	Spacewatch	MIS	1.7 km	MPC · JPL
798251	2012 GJ_{34}	—	February 24, 2012	Mount Lemmon	Mount Lemmon Survey	H	370 m	MPC · JPL
798252	2012 GO_{34}	—	January 6, 2012	Haleakala	Pan-STARRS 1	JUN	830 m	MPC · JPL
798253	2012 GK_{35}	—	August 20, 2004	Kitt Peak	Spacewatch	·	1.0 km	MPC · JPL
798254	2012 GT_{39}	—	March 15, 2012	Kitt Peak	Spacewatch	·	1.4 km	MPC · JPL
798255	2012 GE_{42}	—	February 20, 2015	Haleakala	Pan-STARRS 1	·	550 m	MPC · JPL
798256	2012 GR_{46}	—	April 20, 2017	Haleakala	Pan-STARRS 1	·	1.3 km	MPC · JPL
798257	2012 GG_{47}	—	July 11, 2018	Haleakala	Pan-STARRS 1	·	1.2 km	MPC · JPL
798258	2012 GL_{47}	—	October 1, 2014	Haleakala	Pan-STARRS 1	·	1.3 km	MPC · JPL
798259	2012 GM_{47}	—	February 27, 2016	Mount Lemmon	Mount Lemmon Survey	·	1.1 km	MPC · JPL
798260	2012 GW_{50}	—	April 11, 2012	Mount Lemmon	Mount Lemmon Survey	·	1.3 km	MPC · JPL
798261	2012 GB_{51}	—	April 15, 2012	Haleakala	Pan-STARRS 1	·	1.6 km	MPC · JPL
798262	2012 GS_{51}	—	April 15, 2012	Haleakala	Pan-STARRS 1	·	1.4 km	MPC · JPL
798263	2012 GE_{52}	—	April 11, 2012	Mount Lemmon	Mount Lemmon Survey	THM	1.5 km	MPC · JPL
798264	2012 GR_{52}	—	April 1, 2012	Kitt Peak	Spacewatch	DOR	1.7 km	MPC · JPL
798265	2012 GW_{54}	—	April 15, 2012	Haleakala	Pan-STARRS 1	·	930 m	MPC · JPL
798266	2012 HP_{1}	—	March 13, 2012	Catalina	CSS	H	450 m	MPC · JPL
798267	2012 HD_{3}	—	April 16, 2012	Kitt Peak	Spacewatch	·	1.7 km	MPC · JPL
798268	2012 HZ_{3}	—	March 16, 2012	Kitt Peak	Spacewatch	·	1.2 km	MPC · JPL
798269	2012 HN_{7}	—	February 29, 2012	Mount Lemmon	Mount Lemmon Survey	·	1.2 km	MPC · JPL
798270	2012 HL_{11}	—	February 7, 2003	La Silla	Barbieri, C.	·	1.0 km	MPC · JPL
798271	2012 HL_{13}	—	April 21, 2012	Haleakala	Pan-STARRS 1	·	1.7 km	MPC · JPL
798272	2012 HR_{14}	—	March 17, 2012	Mount Lemmon	Mount Lemmon Survey	·	1.5 km	MPC · JPL
798273	2012 HL_{24}	—	April 15, 2012	Haleakala	Pan-STARRS 1	·	1.4 km	MPC · JPL
798274	2012 HA_{29}	—	April 13, 2012	Catalina	CSS	JUN	790 m	MPC · JPL
798275	2012 HN_{29}	—	April 27, 2012	Haleakala	Pan-STARRS 1	·	1.1 km	MPC · JPL
798276	2012 HB_{33}	—	April 15, 2012	Haleakala	Pan-STARRS 1	·	1.1 km	MPC · JPL
798277	2012 HJ_{33}	—	April 18, 2012	Kitt Peak	Spacewatch	·	1.4 km	MPC · JPL
798278	2012 HQ_{36}	—	April 27, 2012	Haleakala	Pan-STARRS 1	EUN	730 m	MPC · JPL
798279	2012 HR_{36}	—	April 22, 2012	Kitt Peak	Spacewatch	·	630 m	MPC · JPL
798280	2012 HX_{39}	—	April 1, 2012	Mount Lemmon	Mount Lemmon Survey	·	1.3 km	MPC · JPL
798281	2012 HL_{45}	—	April 20, 2012	Mount Lemmon	Mount Lemmon Survey	·	1.3 km	MPC · JPL
798282	2012 HA_{49}	—	March 23, 2012	Mount Lemmon	Mount Lemmon Survey	H	400 m	MPC · JPL
798283	2012 HS_{50}	—	April 24, 2012	Haleakala	Pan-STARRS 1	·	1.1 km	MPC · JPL
798284	2012 HK_{56}	—	March 30, 2012	Kitt Peak	Spacewatch	·	1.3 km	MPC · JPL
798285	2012 HW_{60}	—	April 19, 2012	Mount Lemmon	Mount Lemmon Survey	·	1.3 km	MPC · JPL
798286	2012 HP_{62}	—	January 14, 2011	Mount Lemmon	Mount Lemmon Survey	·	1.7 km	MPC · JPL
798287	2012 HS_{65}	—	April 20, 2012	Mount Lemmon	Mount Lemmon Survey	·	1.5 km	MPC · JPL
798288	2012 HN_{69}	—	April 11, 2012	Mount Lemmon	Mount Lemmon Survey	·	1.2 km	MPC · JPL
798289	2012 HF_{70}	—	March 30, 2012	Kitt Peak	Spacewatch	·	1.9 km	MPC · JPL
798290	2012 HM_{70}	—	April 19, 2012	Kitt Peak	Spacewatch	·	1.5 km	MPC · JPL
798291	2012 HA_{76}	—	April 24, 2012	Kitt Peak	Spacewatch	(1547)	1.5 km	MPC · JPL
798292	2012 HC_{76}	—	April 20, 2012	Mount Lemmon	Mount Lemmon Survey	·	2.4 km	MPC · JPL
798293	2012 HT_{81}	—	April 16, 2012	Haleakala	Pan-STARRS 1	·	1.5 km	MPC · JPL
798294	2012 HD_{86}	—	April 19, 2012	Mount Lemmon	Mount Lemmon Survey	EOS	1.3 km	MPC · JPL
798295	2012 HS_{86}	—	April 22, 2012	Kitt Peak	Spacewatch	EUN	820 m	MPC · JPL
798296	2012 HM_{88}	—	April 18, 2012	Mount Lemmon	Mount Lemmon Survey	JUN	750 m	MPC · JPL
798297	2012 HT_{88}	—	April 27, 2012	Haleakala	Pan-STARRS 1	·	640 m	MPC · JPL
798298	2012 HJ_{89}	—	April 24, 2012	Kitt Peak	Spacewatch	·	1.1 km	MPC · JPL
798299	2012 HE_{90}	—	September 23, 2008	Mount Lemmon	Mount Lemmon Survey	·	1.4 km	MPC · JPL
798300	2012 HT_{90}	—	April 16, 2012	Haleakala	Pan-STARRS 1	·	1.2 km	MPC · JPL

== 798301–798400 ==
back to top

Designation			Discovery			Properties		Ref
Permanent	Provisional	Named after	Date	Site	Discoverer(s)	Category	Diam.	Ref
798301	2012 HU_{91}	—	April 16, 2012	Kitt Peak	Spacewatch	·	1.6 km	MPC · JPL
798302	2012 HY_{91}	—	April 27, 2012	Haleakala	Pan-STARRS 1	·	1.8 km	MPC · JPL
798303	2012 HA_{92}	—	April 20, 2012	Kitt Peak	Spacewatch	·	1.1 km	MPC · JPL
798304	2012 HC_{92}	—	April 20, 2012	Kitt Peak	Spacewatch	·	1.1 km	MPC · JPL
798305	2012 HF_{96}	—	July 25, 2017	Haleakala	Pan-STARRS 1	·	1.2 km	MPC · JPL
798306	2012 HZ_{96}	—	August 28, 2014	Haleakala	Pan-STARRS 1	·	2.3 km	MPC · JPL
798307	2012 HA_{98}	—	April 16, 2012	Haleakala	Pan-STARRS 1	·	1.1 km	MPC · JPL
798308	2012 HO_{98}	—	February 9, 2011	Mount Lemmon	Mount Lemmon Survey	·	2.4 km	MPC · JPL
798309	2012 HC_{99}	—	April 27, 2012	Haleakala	Pan-STARRS 1	·	2.2 km	MPC · JPL
798310	2012 HR_{101}	—	April 20, 2012	Mount Lemmon	Mount Lemmon Survey	·	1.1 km	MPC · JPL
798311	2012 HZ_{101}	—	April 27, 2012	Haleakala	Pan-STARRS 1	MRX	670 m	MPC · JPL
798312	2012 HM_{105}	—	April 18, 2012	Mount Lemmon	Mount Lemmon Survey	·	1.2 km	MPC · JPL
798313	2012 HP_{105}	—	April 30, 2012	Kitt Peak	Spacewatch	·	1.7 km	MPC · JPL
798314	2012 HW_{105}	—	April 27, 2012	Haleakala	Pan-STARRS 1	·	1.2 km	MPC · JPL
798315	2012 HD_{106}	—	April 27, 2012	Haleakala	Pan-STARRS 1	·	1.1 km	MPC · JPL
798316	2012 HK_{106}	—	April 27, 2012	Haleakala	Pan-STARRS 1	·	1.2 km	MPC · JPL
798317	2012 HZ_{106}	—	April 28, 2012	Mount Lemmon	Mount Lemmon Survey	·	1.3 km	MPC · JPL
798318	2012 HR_{107}	—	April 27, 2012	Haleakala	Pan-STARRS 1	·	1.3 km	MPC · JPL
798319	2012 HU_{107}	—	April 27, 2012	Haleakala	Pan-STARRS 1	·	950 m	MPC · JPL
798320	2012 HK_{109}	—	April 27, 2012	Haleakala	Pan-STARRS 1	·	2.2 km	MPC · JPL
798321	2012 HW_{109}	—	August 9, 2004	Siding Spring	SSS	·	1.4 km	MPC · JPL
798322	2012 HA_{110}	—	April 27, 2012	Haleakala	Pan-STARRS 1	·	1.3 km	MPC · JPL
798323	2012 HG_{110}	—	April 27, 2012	Haleakala	Pan-STARRS 1	VER	2.1 km	MPC · JPL
798324	2012 HJ_{111}	—	April 27, 2012	Haleakala	Pan-STARRS 1	(1298)	2.1 km	MPC · JPL
798325	2012 HL_{111}	—	January 10, 2011	Mount Lemmon	Mount Lemmon Survey	EOS	1.4 km	MPC · JPL
798326	2012 HO_{113}	—	April 29, 2012	Kitt Peak	Spacewatch	·	1.6 km	MPC · JPL
798327	2012 HC_{115}	—	April 25, 2012	Kitt Peak	Spacewatch	·	1.8 km	MPC · JPL
798328	2012 HM_{116}	—	April 27, 2012	Haleakala	Pan-STARRS 1	·	1.6 km	MPC · JPL
798329	2012 HP_{117}	—	April 27, 2012	Haleakala	Pan-STARRS 1	·	1.2 km	MPC · JPL
798330	2012 HO_{118}	—	April 27, 2012	Haleakala	Pan-STARRS 1	·	1.3 km	MPC · JPL
798331	2012 JF_{1}	—	March 29, 2012	Mount Lemmon	Mount Lemmon Survey	·	1.0 km	MPC · JPL
798332	2012 JJ_{10}	—	April 18, 2012	Kitt Peak	Spacewatch	·	960 m	MPC · JPL
798333	2012 JT_{12}	—	April 19, 2012	Mount Lemmon	Mount Lemmon Survey	H	390 m	MPC · JPL
798334	2012 JX_{12}	—	April 21, 2012	Catalina	CSS	JUN	670 m	MPC · JPL
798335	2012 JO_{13}	—	May 14, 2012	Mount Lemmon	Mount Lemmon Survey	·	1.2 km	MPC · JPL
798336	2012 JZ_{14}	—	April 24, 2012	Westfield	International Astronomical Search Collaboration	H	440 m	MPC · JPL
798337	2012 JY_{22}	—	April 15, 2012	Haleakala	Pan-STARRS 1	·	1.2 km	MPC · JPL
798338	2012 JE_{41}	—	May 13, 2012	Kitt Peak	Spacewatch	·	1.2 km	MPC · JPL
798339	2012 JL_{41}	—	April 28, 2012	Mount Lemmon	Mount Lemmon Survey	·	1.2 km	MPC · JPL
798340	2012 JQ_{41}	—	April 29, 2012	Mount Lemmon	Mount Lemmon Survey	THB	2.3 km	MPC · JPL
798341	2012 JX_{41}	—	May 1, 2012	Mount Lemmon	Mount Lemmon Survey	VER	1.9 km	MPC · JPL
798342	2012 JN_{42}	—	May 14, 2012	Mount Lemmon	Mount Lemmon Survey	·	1.4 km	MPC · JPL
798343	2012 JS_{42}	—	April 28, 2012	Mount Lemmon	Mount Lemmon Survey	LEO	1.4 km	MPC · JPL
798344	2012 JU_{46}	—	May 12, 2012	Kitt Peak	Spacewatch	TIN	760 m	MPC · JPL
798345	2012 JX_{46}	—	May 13, 2012	Kitt Peak	Spacewatch	TIR	1.7 km	MPC · JPL
798346	2012 JP_{47}	—	April 26, 2006	Cerro Tololo	Deep Ecliptic Survey	·	1.8 km	MPC · JPL
798347	2012 JU_{49}	—	May 12, 2012	Mount Lemmon	Mount Lemmon Survey	·	1.8 km	MPC · JPL
798348	2012 JW_{50}	—	May 13, 2012	Mount Lemmon	Mount Lemmon Survey	·	810 m	MPC · JPL
798349	2012 JM_{58}	—	May 13, 2012	Mount Lemmon	Mount Lemmon Survey	·	1.2 km	MPC · JPL
798350	2012 JL_{60}	—	May 13, 2012	Mount Lemmon	Mount Lemmon Survey	·	1.2 km	MPC · JPL
798351	2012 JC_{63}	—	May 15, 2012	Mount Lemmon	Mount Lemmon Survey	·	1.7 km	MPC · JPL
798352	2012 JY_{64}	—	May 15, 2012	Haleakala	Pan-STARRS 1	·	1.0 km	MPC · JPL
798353	2012 JZ_{68}	—	May 1, 2012	Mount Lemmon	Mount Lemmon Survey	·	2.2 km	MPC · JPL
798354	2012 JW_{70}	—	May 14, 2012	Haleakala	Pan-STARRS 1	EUN	720 m	MPC · JPL
798355	2012 JQ_{71}	—	April 21, 2012	Mount Lemmon	Mount Lemmon Survey	·	2.9 km	MPC · JPL
798356	2012 JY_{71}	—	May 12, 2012	Mount Lemmon	Mount Lemmon Survey	·	1.5 km	MPC · JPL
798357	2012 JD_{72}	—	May 15, 2012	Kitt Peak	Spacewatch	EUN	850 m	MPC · JPL
798358	2012 KH_{1}	—	May 17, 2012	Haleakala	Pan-STARRS 1	H	520 m	MPC · JPL
798359	2012 KH_{3}	—	May 17, 2012	Mount Lemmon	Mount Lemmon Survey	·	1.9 km	MPC · JPL
798360	2012 KQ_{4}	—	May 18, 2012	Haleakala	Pan-STARRS 1	H	440 m	MPC · JPL
798361	2012 KF_{7}	—	May 19, 2012	Haleakala	Pan-STARRS 1	H	490 m	MPC · JPL
798362	2012 KV_{11}	—	October 17, 2006	Mount Lemmon	Mount Lemmon Survey	·	370 m	MPC · JPL
798363	2012 KO_{13}	—	December 2, 2005	Mount Lemmon	Mount Lemmon Survey	·	1.3 km	MPC · JPL
798364	2012 KE_{24}	—	April 18, 2012	Mount Lemmon	Mount Lemmon Survey	·	1.1 km	MPC · JPL
798365	2012 KK_{27}	—	April 28, 2012	Kitt Peak	Spacewatch	·	1.6 km	MPC · JPL
798366	2012 KC_{30}	—	May 18, 2012	Haleakala	Pan-STARRS 1	·	1.6 km	MPC · JPL
798367	2012 KH_{32}	—	May 16, 2012	Mount Lemmon	Mount Lemmon Survey	·	2.3 km	MPC · JPL
798368	2012 KL_{32}	—	March 9, 2007	Mount Lemmon	Mount Lemmon Survey	·	1.3 km	MPC · JPL
798369	2012 KQ_{32}	—	May 16, 2012	Mount Lemmon	Mount Lemmon Survey	·	1.2 km	MPC · JPL
798370	2012 KE_{35}	—	March 29, 2012	Kitt Peak	Spacewatch	DOR	2.1 km	MPC · JPL
798371	2012 KY_{35}	—	April 20, 2012	Kitt Peak	Spacewatch	(1547)	910 m	MPC · JPL
798372	2012 KN_{37}	—	May 17, 2012	Mount Lemmon	Mount Lemmon Survey	·	2.4 km	MPC · JPL
798373	2012 KR_{42}	—	April 19, 2012	Kitt Peak	Spacewatch	·	1.3 km	MPC · JPL
798374	2012 KW_{42}	—	January 24, 2007	Mount Lemmon	Mount Lemmon Survey	JUN	700 m	MPC · JPL
798375	2012 KQ_{45}	—	May 29, 2012	Mount Lemmon	Mount Lemmon Survey	·	920 m	MPC · JPL
798376	2012 KE_{51}	—	April 19, 2012	Mount Lemmon	Mount Lemmon Survey	·	490 m	MPC · JPL
798377	2012 KZ_{52}	—	February 13, 2008	Mount Lemmon	Mount Lemmon Survey	·	520 m	MPC · JPL
798378	2012 KP_{54}	—	February 18, 2015	Mount Lemmon	Mount Lemmon Survey	·	670 m	MPC · JPL
798379	2012 KT_{54}	—	May 28, 2012	Mount Lemmon	Mount Lemmon Survey	·	1.3 km	MPC · JPL
798380	2012 KL_{55}	—	May 16, 2012	Mount Lemmon	Mount Lemmon Survey	H	460 m	MPC · JPL
798381	2012 KQ_{55}	—	May 20, 2012	Mount Lemmon	Mount Lemmon Survey	·	1.4 km	MPC · JPL
798382	2012 KF_{56}	—	May 19, 2012	Mount Lemmon	Mount Lemmon Survey	·	1.5 km	MPC · JPL
798383	2012 KQ_{57}	—	May 16, 2012	Mount Lemmon	Mount Lemmon Survey	·	1.2 km	MPC · JPL
798384	2012 KJ_{58}	—	July 14, 2013	Haleakala	Pan-STARRS 1	·	1.9 km	MPC · JPL
798385	2012 KM_{58}	—	October 3, 2013	Mount Lemmon	Mount Lemmon Survey	·	960 m	MPC · JPL
798386	2012 KO_{58}	—	January 31, 2017	Haleakala	Pan-STARRS 1	·	2.3 km	MPC · JPL
798387	2012 KH_{60}	—	May 20, 2012	Haleakala	Pan-STARRS 1	·	1.3 km	MPC · JPL
798388	2012 KJ_{62}	—	May 21, 2012	Mount Lemmon	Mount Lemmon Survey	·	940 m	MPC · JPL
798389	2012 KM_{62}	—	May 16, 2012	Haleakala	Pan-STARRS 1	·	1.2 km	MPC · JPL
798390	2012 KL_{64}	—	May 27, 2012	Mount Lemmon	Mount Lemmon Survey	·	1.5 km	MPC · JPL
798391	2012 KA_{65}	—	May 31, 2012	Mount Lemmon	Mount Lemmon Survey	NAE	1.8 km	MPC · JPL
798392	2012 KN_{65}	—	May 27, 2012	Mount Lemmon	Mount Lemmon Survey	THM	1.8 km	MPC · JPL
798393	2012 KX_{65}	—	May 21, 2012	Mount Lemmon	Mount Lemmon Survey	·	2.0 km	MPC · JPL
798394	2012 LO_{3}	—	January 31, 2012	Haleakala	Pan-STARRS 1	JUN	870 m	MPC · JPL
798395	2012 LJ_{5}	—	June 10, 2012	Haleakala	Pan-STARRS 1	·	410 m	MPC · JPL
798396	2012 LR_{6}	—	June 8, 2012	Mount Lemmon	Mount Lemmon Survey	·	1.7 km	MPC · JPL
798397	2012 LT_{10}	—	May 16, 2012	Haleakala	Pan-STARRS 1	·	1.2 km	MPC · JPL
798398	2012 LR_{11}	—	June 13, 2012	Haleakala	Pan-STARRS 1	·	1.6 km	MPC · JPL
798399	2012 LM_{13}	—	June 15, 2012	Haleakala	Pan-STARRS 1	·	1.4 km	MPC · JPL
798400	2012 LK_{16}	—	June 9, 2012	Haleakala	Pan-STARRS 1	GAL	1.3 km	MPC · JPL

== 798401–798500 ==
back to top

Designation			Discovery			Properties		Ref
Permanent	Provisional	Named after	Date	Site	Discoverer(s)	Category	Diam.	Ref
798401	2012 LU_{17}	—	October 14, 2010	Mount Lemmon	Mount Lemmon Survey	H	430 m	MPC · JPL
798402	2012 LS_{22}	—	June 13, 2012	Haleakala	Pan-STARRS 1	H	500 m	MPC · JPL
798403	2012 LL_{26}	—	June 8, 2012	Haleakala	Pan-STARRS 1	·	1.5 km	MPC · JPL
798404	2012 LH_{27}	—	December 31, 2013	Kitt Peak	Spacewatch	PHO	1.2 km	MPC · JPL
798405	2012 LY_{27}	—	March 28, 2016	Mount Lemmon	Mount Lemmon Survey	·	1.4 km	MPC · JPL
798406	2012 LB_{28}	—	June 8, 2012	Mount Lemmon	Mount Lemmon Survey	·	1.4 km	MPC · JPL
798407	2012 LJ_{28}	—	March 5, 2016	Haleakala	Pan-STARRS 1	·	1.7 km	MPC · JPL
798408	2012 LC_{30}	—	October 9, 2013	Mount Lemmon	Mount Lemmon Survey	·	2.0 km	MPC · JPL
798409	2012 LM_{30}	—	March 12, 2016	Haleakala	Pan-STARRS 1	·	960 m	MPC · JPL
798410	2012 LJ_{32}	—	June 9, 2012	Mount Lemmon	Mount Lemmon Survey	·	2.1 km	MPC · JPL
798411	2012 LA_{33}	—	June 13, 2012	Haleakala	Pan-STARRS 1	EOS	1.2 km	MPC · JPL
798412	2012 ML_{6}	—	June 21, 2012	Socorro	LINEAR	APO	350 m	MPC · JPL
798413	2012 MW_{15}	—	May 30, 2012	Mount Lemmon	Mount Lemmon Survey	·	2.4 km	MPC · JPL
798414	2012 OT_{1}	—	August 16, 2002	Palomar Mountain	NEAT	·	440 m	MPC · JPL
798415	2012 OJ_{4}	—	May 7, 2005	Kitt Peak	Spacewatch	·	590 m	MPC · JPL
798416	2012 OD_{7}	—	July 23, 2012	Siding Spring	SSS	·	1.8 km	MPC · JPL
798417	2012 OU_{7}	—	July 16, 2012	Zelenchukskaya	T. V. Krjačko	·	810 m	MPC · JPL
798418	2012 PP_{3}	—	August 8, 2012	Haleakala	Pan-STARRS 1	·	1.1 km	MPC · JPL
798419	2012 PR_{3}	—	August 6, 2005	Palomar Mountain	NEAT	V	500 m	MPC · JPL
798420	2012 PZ_{8}	—	October 20, 2003	Socorro	LINEAR	·	1.6 km	MPC · JPL
798421	2012 PH_{10}	—	May 13, 2005	Kitt Peak	Spacewatch	·	650 m	MPC · JPL
798422	2012 PB_{12}	—	August 10, 2012	Kitt Peak	Spacewatch	·	530 m	MPC · JPL
798423	2012 PQ_{24}	—	August 13, 2012	Haleakala	Pan-STARRS 1	AGN	840 m	MPC · JPL
798424	2012 PA_{34}	—	August 6, 2012	Haleakala	Pan-STARRS 1	V	520 m	MPC · JPL
798425	2012 PN_{40}	—	August 6, 2012	Haleakala	Pan-STARRS 1	EUN	830 m	MPC · JPL
798426	2012 PN_{42}	—	August 10, 2012	Kitt Peak	Spacewatch	·	690 m	MPC · JPL
798427	2012 PL_{44}	—	August 13, 2012	Kitt Peak	Spacewatch	H	380 m	MPC · JPL
798428	2012 PN_{49}	—	August 14, 2012	Siding Spring	SSS	T_{j} (2.98)	2.3 km	MPC · JPL
798429	2012 PO_{53}	—	August 13, 2012	Haleakala	Pan-STARRS 1	·	1.4 km	MPC · JPL
798430	2012 PH_{55}	—	August 14, 2012	Siding Spring	SSS	·	1.8 km	MPC · JPL
798431	2012 PB_{57}	—	August 13, 2012	Haleakala	Pan-STARRS 1	·	2.1 km	MPC · JPL
798432	2012 PH_{58}	—	August 14, 2012	Haleakala	Pan-STARRS 1	·	1.4 km	MPC · JPL
798433	2012 PQ_{60}	—	August 13, 2012	Haleakala	Pan-STARRS 1	·	1.5 km	MPC · JPL
798434	2012 PZ_{60}	—	August 13, 2012	Haleakala	Pan-STARRS 1	KOR	1.1 km	MPC · JPL
798435	2012 PC_{61}	—	August 14, 2012	Haleakala	Pan-STARRS 1	THM	1.5 km	MPC · JPL
798436	2012 PT_{61}	—	January 18, 2009	Kitt Peak	Spacewatch	·	1.6 km	MPC · JPL
798437	2012 PG_{62}	—	August 4, 2012	Haleakala	Pan-STARRS 1	AEO	910 m	MPC · JPL
798438	2012 PJ_{62}	—	August 13, 2012	Haleakala	Pan-STARRS 1	·	1.6 km	MPC · JPL
798439	2012 PS_{64}	—	August 14, 2012	Haleakala	Pan-STARRS 1	·	1.2 km	MPC · JPL
798440	2012 PG_{65}	—	August 8, 2012	Haleakala	Pan-STARRS 1	·	2.7 km	MPC · JPL
798441	2012 QK_{3}	—	August 11, 2012	Mayhill-ISON	L. Elenin	(2076)	630 m	MPC · JPL
798442	2012 QQ_{8}	—	October 29, 2008	Kitt Peak	Spacewatch	KOR	980 m	MPC · JPL
798443	2012 QS_{8}	—	July 27, 2012	Sandlot	G. Hug	·	1.0 km	MPC · JPL
798444	2012 QF_{12}	—	November 16, 2009	Kitt Peak	Spacewatch	·	750 m	MPC · JPL
798445	2012 QU_{16}	—	August 13, 2012	Haleakala	Pan-STARRS 1	H	570 m	MPC · JPL
798446	2012 QS_{17}	—	March 21, 2001	Kitt Peak	SKADS	·	1.7 km	MPC · JPL
798447	2012 QF_{24}	—	August 24, 2012	Kitt Peak	Spacewatch	·	580 m	MPC · JPL
798448	2012 QY_{24}	—	May 1, 2011	Haleakala	Pan-STARRS 1	·	2.2 km	MPC · JPL
798449	2012 QU_{30}	—	October 1, 2005	Catalina	CSS	·	910 m	MPC · JPL
798450	2012 QK_{32}	—	August 25, 2012	Kitt Peak	Spacewatch	·	1.7 km	MPC · JPL
798451	2012 QZ_{35}	—	August 13, 2012	Kitt Peak	Spacewatch	MRX	780 m	MPC · JPL
798452	2012 QR_{36}	—	August 25, 2012	Catalina	CSS	·	590 m	MPC · JPL
798453	2012 QH_{42}	—	August 4, 2005	Palomar Mountain	NEAT	·	900 m	MPC · JPL
798454	2012 QT_{45}	—	August 13, 2012	Haleakala	Pan-STARRS 1	·	1.4 km	MPC · JPL
798455	2012 QJ_{48}	—	August 17, 2012	ESA OGS	ESA OGS	H	430 m	MPC · JPL
798456	2012 QO_{52}	—	August 21, 2012	Haleakala	Pan-STARRS 1	H	370 m	MPC · JPL
798457	2012 QU_{56}	—	August 26, 2012	Haleakala	Pan-STARRS 1	·	2.1 km	MPC · JPL
798458	2012 QD_{57}	—	August 26, 2012	Haleakala	Pan-STARRS 1	PHO	760 m	MPC · JPL
798459	2012 QK_{59}	—	August 28, 2012	Mount Lemmon	Mount Lemmon Survey	T_{j} (2.96)	2.9 km	MPC · JPL
798460	2012 QD_{63}	—	December 20, 2014	Kitt Peak	Spacewatch	·	2.3 km	MPC · JPL
798461	2012 QZ_{64}	—	August 24, 2012	Kitt Peak	Spacewatch	GEF	910 m	MPC · JPL
798462	2012 QM_{66}	—	August 17, 2012	Haleakala	Pan-STARRS 1	·	2.0 km	MPC · JPL
798463	2012 QQ_{67}	—	August 26, 2012	Kitt Peak	Spacewatch	·	970 m	MPC · JPL
798464	2012 QD_{70}	—	August 17, 2012	Haleakala	Pan-STARRS 1	·	1.4 km	MPC · JPL
798465	2012 QK_{70}	—	August 25, 2012	Kitt Peak	Spacewatch	DOR	1.5 km	MPC · JPL
798466	2012 QH_{71}	—	August 17, 2012	Haleakala	Pan-STARRS 1	·	1.2 km	MPC · JPL
798467	2012 QY_{74}	—	August 17, 2012	Haleakala	Pan-STARRS 1	AEO	790 m	MPC · JPL
798468	2012 QA_{75}	—	October 11, 2012	Mount Lemmon	Mount Lemmon Survey	·	1.9 km	MPC · JPL
798469	2012 QJ_{78}	—	August 17, 2012	Haleakala	Pan-STARRS 1	·	1.1 km	MPC · JPL
798470	2012 QH_{80}	—	August 26, 2012	Haleakala	Pan-STARRS 1	·	2.0 km	MPC · JPL
798471	2012 QL_{80}	—	August 17, 2012	Haleakala	Pan-STARRS 1	·	1.8 km	MPC · JPL
798472	2012 QF_{82}	—	August 26, 2012	Haleakala	Pan-STARRS 1	URS	1.8 km	MPC · JPL
798473	2012 QH_{84}	—	August 26, 2012	Haleakala	Pan-STARRS 1	L5	6.1 km	MPC · JPL
798474	2012 RM_{3}	—	January 18, 2008	Mount Lemmon	Mount Lemmon Survey	H	460 m	MPC · JPL
798475	2012 RJ_{9}	—	September 11, 2012	Alder Springs	K. Levin, N. Teamo	·	640 m	MPC · JPL
798476	2012 RY_{17}	—	September 14, 2012	ESA OGS	ESA OGS	·	1.2 km	MPC · JPL
798477	2012 RZ_{18}	—	September 14, 2012	Catalina	CSS	·	2.3 km	MPC · JPL
798478	2012 RV_{24}	—	September 13, 2012	Mount Teide	E. Schwab	·	1.5 km	MPC · JPL
798479	2012 RV_{26}	—	September 13, 2012	Mount Lemmon	Mount Lemmon Survey	·	1.5 km	MPC · JPL
798480	2012 RJ_{31}	—	September 14, 2012	Catalina	CSS	T_{j} (2.9)	2.7 km	MPC · JPL
798481	2012 RS_{38}	—	May 13, 2007	Kitt Peak	Spacewatch	JUN	900 m	MPC · JPL
798482	2012 RT_{44}	—	September 15, 2012	Catalina	CSS	·	1.9 km	MPC · JPL
798483	2012 RB_{45}	—	September 15, 2012	Mount Lemmon	Mount Lemmon Survey	·	1.3 km	MPC · JPL
798484	2012 RR_{46}	—	September 14, 2012	ESA OGS	ESA OGS	·	2.1 km	MPC · JPL
798485	2012 RU_{50}	—	September 13, 2012	Mount Lemmon	Mount Lemmon Survey	·	1.8 km	MPC · JPL
798486	2012 SL	—	April 2, 2011	Mount Lemmon	Mount Lemmon Survey	·	830 m	MPC · JPL
798487	2012 SS_{7}	—	September 17, 2012	Mount Lemmon	Mount Lemmon Survey	THM	1.6 km	MPC · JPL
798488	2012 SA_{8}	—	May 1, 2011	Haleakala	Pan-STARRS 1	·	1.4 km	MPC · JPL
798489	2012 SX_{18}	—	September 17, 2012	Kitt Peak	Spacewatch	·	660 m	MPC · JPL
798490	2012 SO_{19}	—	August 26, 2012	Haleakala	Pan-STARRS 1	·	1.0 km	MPC · JPL
798491	2012 SP_{19}	—	August 23, 2012	Puebla de Don Fadrique	OAM	TIN	830 m	MPC · JPL
798492	2012 SE_{20}	—	September 19, 2012	Mount Lemmon	Mount Lemmon Survey	·	1.9 km	MPC · JPL
798493	2012 ST_{35}	—	September 18, 2012	Mount Lemmon	Mount Lemmon Survey	·	1.1 km	MPC · JPL
798494	2012 SH_{41}	—	August 26, 2012	Haleakala	Pan-STARRS 1	·	900 m	MPC · JPL
798495	2012 SE_{42}	—	October 8, 2008	Mount Lemmon	Mount Lemmon Survey	·	500 m	MPC · JPL
798496	2012 SL_{52}	—	August 26, 2012	Haleakala	Pan-STARRS 1	·	1.4 km	MPC · JPL
798497	2012 SZ_{53}	—	October 5, 2005	Mount Lemmon	Mount Lemmon Survey	critical	560 m	MPC · JPL
798498	2012 SR_{74}	—	September 21, 2012	Kitt Peak	Spacewatch	MAR	810 m	MPC · JPL
798499	2012 SU_{75}	—	September 19, 2012	Mount Lemmon	Mount Lemmon Survey	·	1.4 km	MPC · JPL
798500	2012 SN_{76}	—	September 17, 2012	Mount Lemmon	Mount Lemmon Survey	615	950 m	MPC · JPL

== 798501–798600 ==
back to top

Designation			Discovery			Properties		Ref
Permanent	Provisional	Named after	Date	Site	Discoverer(s)	Category	Diam.	Ref
798501	2012 SE_{79}	—	September 25, 2012	Kitt Peak	Spacewatch	·	720 m	MPC · JPL
798502	2012 SD_{85}	—	February 18, 2015	Haleakala	Pan-STARRS 1	·	1.5 km	MPC · JPL
798503	2012 SG_{87}	—	September 25, 2012	Mount Lemmon	Mount Lemmon Survey	·	1.3 km	MPC · JPL
798504	2012 SN_{92}	—	September 22, 2012	Mount Lemmon	Mount Lemmon Survey	·	1.3 km	MPC · JPL
798505	2012 SZ_{93}	—	September 17, 2012	Mount Lemmon	Mount Lemmon Survey	·	1.4 km	MPC · JPL
798506	2012 SD_{95}	—	September 25, 2012	Mount Lemmon	Mount Lemmon Survey	(13314)	1.3 km	MPC · JPL
798507	2012 SA_{100}	—	September 16, 2012	Mount Lemmon	Mount Lemmon Survey	GEF	920 m	MPC · JPL
798508	2012 SO_{102}	—	September 2, 2017	Mount Lemmon	Mount Lemmon Survey	·	1.6 km	MPC · JPL
798509	2012 SX_{102}	—	February 9, 2019	Mount Lemmon	Mount Lemmon Survey	·	1.4 km	MPC · JPL
798510	2012 TR_{7}	—	August 25, 2012	Haleakala	Pan-STARRS 1	H	400 m	MPC · JPL
798511	2012 TP_{16}	—	October 4, 2012	Mount Lemmon	Mount Lemmon Survey	EOS	1.3 km	MPC · JPL
798512	2012 TS_{29}	—	January 26, 2006	Mount Lemmon	Mount Lemmon Survey	·	1.0 km	MPC · JPL
798513	2012 TV_{30}	—	October 17, 2001	Palomar Mountain	NEAT	H	520 m	MPC · JPL
798514	2012 TZ_{31}	—	September 20, 2003	Kitt Peak	Spacewatch	·	1.5 km	MPC · JPL
798515	2012 TA_{33}	—	September 15, 2012	Kitt Peak	Spacewatch	·	1.2 km	MPC · JPL
798516	2012 TF_{36}	—	October 5, 2012	Mount Lemmon	Mount Lemmon Survey	·	1.6 km	MPC · JPL
798517	2012 TD_{39}	—	October 8, 2012	Mount Lemmon	Mount Lemmon Survey	·	1.1 km	MPC · JPL
798518	2012 TV_{41}	—	October 8, 2012	Mount Lemmon	Mount Lemmon Survey	TIR	1.8 km	MPC · JPL
798519	2012 TH_{51}	—	September 15, 2012	Kitt Peak	Spacewatch	·	2.2 km	MPC · JPL
798520	2012 TJ_{51}	—	October 8, 2012	Haleakala	Pan-STARRS 1	·	1.1 km	MPC · JPL
798521	2012 TJ_{59}	—	November 3, 2007	Mount Lemmon	Mount Lemmon Survey	·	1.9 km	MPC · JPL
798522	2012 TA_{61}	—	October 15, 2007	Kitt Peak	Spacewatch	·	1.4 km	MPC · JPL
798523	2012 TO_{65}	—	October 8, 2012	Mount Lemmon	Mount Lemmon Survey	·	970 m	MPC · JPL
798524	2012 TA_{70}	—	October 8, 2012	Haleakala	Pan-STARRS 1	·	1.8 km	MPC · JPL
798525	2012 TO_{82}	—	October 6, 2012	Mount Lemmon	Mount Lemmon Survey	·	1.3 km	MPC · JPL
798526	2012 TV_{83}	—	September 9, 2007	Mount Lemmon	Mount Lemmon Survey	·	1.3 km	MPC · JPL
798527	2012 TS_{86}	—	September 15, 2012	Mount Lemmon	Mount Lemmon Survey	·	2.2 km	MPC · JPL
798528	2012 TR_{92}	—	December 12, 2002	Kitt Peak	Spacewatch	·	720 m	MPC · JPL
798529	2012 TZ_{95}	—	October 8, 2012	Kitt Peak	Spacewatch	·	1.8 km	MPC · JPL
798530	2012 TK_{98}	—	April 3, 2011	Haleakala	Pan-STARRS 1	·	1.0 km	MPC · JPL
798531	2012 TB_{100}	—	September 16, 2012	Mount Lemmon	Mount Lemmon Survey	PHO	750 m	MPC · JPL
798532	2012 TB_{103}	—	October 9, 2012	Mount Lemmon	Mount Lemmon Survey	·	1.7 km	MPC · JPL
798533	2012 TP_{103}	—	October 9, 2012	Mount Lemmon	Mount Lemmon Survey	·	970 m	MPC · JPL
798534	2012 TB_{106}	—	October 9, 2012	Mount Lemmon	Mount Lemmon Survey	·	1.2 km	MPC · JPL
798535	2012 TD_{110}	—	October 10, 2012	Mount Lemmon	Mount Lemmon Survey	T_{j} (2.99)	1.7 km	MPC · JPL
798536	2012 TN_{115}	—	October 10, 2012	Mount Lemmon	Mount Lemmon Survey	·	1.5 km	MPC · JPL
798537	2012 TQ_{117}	—	October 10, 2012	Mount Lemmon	Mount Lemmon Survey	·	1.1 km	MPC · JPL
798538	2012 TB_{119}	—	October 10, 2012	Mount Lemmon	Mount Lemmon Survey	·	1.2 km	MPC · JPL
798539	2012 TN_{122}	—	October 6, 2012	Mount Lemmon	Mount Lemmon Survey	V	590 m	MPC · JPL
798540	2012 TU_{130}	—	October 6, 2012	Haleakala	Pan-STARRS 1	·	1.3 km	MPC · JPL
798541	2012 TS_{134}	—	September 17, 2012	Mount Lemmon	Mount Lemmon Survey	·	2.1 km	MPC · JPL
798542	2012 TA_{147}	—	September 21, 2012	Kitt Peak	Spacewatch	·	2.1 km	MPC · JPL
798543	2012 TZ_{155}	—	September 15, 2012	ESA OGS	ESA OGS	MAR	710 m	MPC · JPL
798544	2012 TN_{157}	—	August 30, 2005	Palomar Mountain	NEAT	·	700 m	MPC · JPL
798545	2012 TZ_{164}	—	October 8, 2012	Mount Lemmon	Mount Lemmon Survey	·	1.5 km	MPC · JPL
798546	2012 TE_{168}	—	August 5, 2005	Palomar Mountain	NEAT	·	600 m	MPC · JPL
798547	2012 TW_{172}	—	October 9, 2012	Mount Lemmon	Mount Lemmon Survey	·	1.3 km	MPC · JPL
798548	2012 TB_{177}	—	October 9, 2012	Haleakala	Pan-STARRS 1	·	1.0 km	MPC · JPL
798549	2012 TM_{185}	—	August 6, 2005	Palomar Mountain	NEAT	·	590 m	MPC · JPL
798550	2012 TR_{196}	—	October 10, 2012	Mount Lemmon	Mount Lemmon Survey	·	1.3 km	MPC · JPL
798551	2012 TX_{200}	—	October 11, 2012	Mount Lemmon	Mount Lemmon Survey	·	1.2 km	MPC · JPL
798552	2012 TG_{206}	—	October 11, 2012	Mount Lemmon	Mount Lemmon Survey	KOR	880 m	MPC · JPL
798553	2012 TN_{212}	—	October 11, 2012	Haleakala	Pan-STARRS 1	·	1.2 km	MPC · JPL
798554	2012 TP_{214}	—	March 26, 2011	Mount Lemmon	Mount Lemmon Survey	H	460 m	MPC · JPL
798555	2012 TL_{217}	—	October 13, 2012	Haleakala	Pan-STARRS 1	H	450 m	MPC · JPL
798556	2012 TM_{224}	—	October 12, 1998	Kitt Peak	Spacewatch	·	1.5 km	MPC · JPL
798557	2012 TJ_{227}	—	October 15, 2012	Haleakala	Pan-STARRS 1	EOS	1.3 km	MPC · JPL
798558	2012 TB_{229}	—	October 11, 2012	Haleakala	Pan-STARRS 1	·	1.7 km	MPC · JPL
798559	2012 TU_{235}	—	November 20, 2007	Kitt Peak	Spacewatch	·	2.0 km	MPC · JPL
798560	2012 TR_{247}	—	October 11, 2012	Haleakala	Pan-STARRS 1	·	1.6 km	MPC · JPL
798561	2012 TT_{252}	—	October 11, 2012	Haleakala	Pan-STARRS 1	·	1.5 km	MPC · JPL
798562	2012 TC_{270}	—	October 11, 2012	Mount Lemmon	Mount Lemmon Survey	LUT	2.8 km	MPC · JPL
798563	2012 TT_{271}	—	October 14, 2012	Catalina	CSS	·	850 m	MPC · JPL
798564	2012 TZ_{280}	—	September 14, 2007	Mount Lemmon	Mount Lemmon Survey	·	1.1 km	MPC · JPL
798565	2012 TD_{291}	—	October 15, 2012	Kitt Peak	Spacewatch	·	980 m	MPC · JPL
798566	2012 TG_{307}	—	August 27, 2005	Palomar Mountain	NEAT	·	510 m	MPC · JPL
798567	2012 TY_{316}	—	September 15, 2012	Catalina	CSS	·	1.1 km	MPC · JPL
798568	2012 TF_{325}	—	October 9, 2012	Mount Lemmon	Mount Lemmon Survey	HOF	1.7 km	MPC · JPL
798569	2012 TH_{327}	—	October 8, 2012	Haleakala	Pan-STARRS 1	·	1.8 km	MPC · JPL
798570	2012 TC_{333}	—	October 9, 2012	Mount Lemmon	Mount Lemmon Survey	·	920 m	MPC · JPL
798571	2012 TR_{334}	—	January 28, 2015	Haleakala	Pan-STARRS 1	·	1.5 km	MPC · JPL
798572	2012 TT_{334}	—	October 15, 2012	Kitt Peak	Spacewatch	TIR	1.8 km	MPC · JPL
798573	2012 TS_{335}	—	October 8, 2012	Haleakala	Pan-STARRS 1	·	920 m	MPC · JPL
798574	2012 TV_{335}	—	October 7, 2012	Haleakala	Pan-STARRS 1	·	1.4 km	MPC · JPL
798575	2012 TB_{337}	—	February 24, 2014	Haleakala	Pan-STARRS 1	·	1.3 km	MPC · JPL
798576	2012 TM_{339}	—	October 9, 2012	Mount Lemmon	Mount Lemmon Survey	·	1.4 km	MPC · JPL
798577	2012 TH_{340}	—	October 14, 2012	Mount Lemmon	Mount Lemmon Survey	·	1.4 km	MPC · JPL
798578	2012 TU_{341}	—	November 18, 2007	Kitt Peak	Spacewatch	THM	1.2 km	MPC · JPL
798579	2012 TD_{343}	—	December 4, 2016	Mount Lemmon	Mount Lemmon Survey	·	980 m	MPC · JPL
798580	2012 TM_{344}	—	September 26, 2017	Haleakala	Pan-STARRS 1	·	1.4 km	MPC · JPL
798581	2012 TY_{344}	—	October 11, 2012	Mount Lemmon	Mount Lemmon Survey	·	1.3 km	MPC · JPL
798582	2012 TY_{345}	—	December 24, 2013	Mount Lemmon	Mount Lemmon Survey	·	1.5 km	MPC · JPL
798583	2012 TF_{346}	—	October 9, 2012	Mount Lemmon	Mount Lemmon Survey	·	1.8 km	MPC · JPL
798584	2012 TT_{347}	—	August 22, 2017	Haleakala	Pan-STARRS 1	·	1.6 km	MPC · JPL
798585	2012 TC_{352}	—	October 7, 2012	Haleakala	Pan-STARRS 1	·	1.3 km	MPC · JPL
798586	2012 TT_{352}	—	August 22, 2017	Haleakala	Pan-STARRS 1	·	1.6 km	MPC · JPL
798587	2012 TR_{353}	—	October 10, 2012	Mount Lemmon	Mount Lemmon Survey	VER	1.8 km	MPC · JPL
798588	2012 TW_{353}	—	October 8, 2012	Haleakala	Pan-STARRS 1	·	1.4 km	MPC · JPL
798589	2012 TT_{355}	—	October 11, 2012	Mount Lemmon	Mount Lemmon Survey	·	1.7 km	MPC · JPL
798590	2012 TO_{357}	—	October 8, 2012	Kitt Peak	Spacewatch	·	970 m	MPC · JPL
798591	2012 TQ_{357}	—	October 11, 2012	Haleakala	Pan-STARRS 1	VER	1.8 km	MPC · JPL
798592	2012 TY_{357}	—	October 8, 2012	Haleakala	Pan-STARRS 1	·	1.5 km	MPC · JPL
798593	2012 TY_{360}	—	October 11, 2012	Mount Lemmon	Mount Lemmon Survey	·	2.2 km	MPC · JPL
798594	2012 TG_{363}	—	October 15, 2012	Haleakala	Pan-STARRS 1	·	1.1 km	MPC · JPL
798595	2012 TQ_{364}	—	October 11, 2012	Haleakala	Pan-STARRS 1	3:2 · (6124)	3.6 km	MPC · JPL
798596	2012 TG_{365}	—	October 9, 2012	Mount Lemmon	Mount Lemmon Survey	KON	1.5 km	MPC · JPL
798597	2012 TY_{365}	—	October 10, 2012	Mount Lemmon	Mount Lemmon Survey	·	1.7 km	MPC · JPL
798598	2012 TB_{371}	—	October 6, 2012	Mount Lemmon	Mount Lemmon Survey	·	1.9 km	MPC · JPL
798599	2012 TX_{375}	—	October 8, 2012	Haleakala	Pan-STARRS 1	·	2.0 km	MPC · JPL
798600	2012 TQ_{376}	—	October 14, 2012	Kitt Peak	Spacewatch	·	1.3 km	MPC · JPL

== 798601–798700 ==
back to top

Designation			Discovery			Properties		Ref
Permanent	Provisional	Named after	Date	Site	Discoverer(s)	Category	Diam.	Ref
798601	2012 TE_{377}	—	October 8, 2012	Haleakala	Pan-STARRS 1	AGN	850 m	MPC · JPL
798602	2012 TH_{377}	—	October 8, 2012	Mount Lemmon	Mount Lemmon Survey	·	1.2 km	MPC · JPL
798603	2012 TO_{377}	—	October 11, 2012	Haleakala	Pan-STARRS 1	HOF	1.7 km	MPC · JPL
798604	2012 TQ_{378}	—	October 8, 2012	Mount Lemmon	Mount Lemmon Survey	·	1.3 km	MPC · JPL
798605	2012 TK_{381}	—	October 11, 2012	Haleakala	Pan-STARRS 1	·	1.4 km	MPC · JPL
798606	2012 TG_{382}	—	October 11, 2012	Haleakala	Pan-STARRS 1	AGN	810 m	MPC · JPL
798607	2012 TX_{382}	—	October 11, 2012	Kitt Peak	Spacewatch	·	1.3 km	MPC · JPL
798608	2012 TM_{383}	—	October 10, 2012	Kitt Peak	Spacewatch	·	1.2 km	MPC · JPL
798609	2012 TU_{383}	—	October 6, 2012	Haleakala	Pan-STARRS 1	·	2.3 km	MPC · JPL
798610	2012 TM_{385}	—	October 11, 2012	Haleakala	Pan-STARRS 1	·	2.4 km	MPC · JPL
798611	2012 TB_{388}	—	October 9, 2012	Mount Lemmon	Mount Lemmon Survey	·	1.8 km	MPC · JPL
798612	2012 TS_{388}	—	October 8, 2012	Haleakala	Pan-STARRS 1	·	2.0 km	MPC · JPL
798613	2012 TY_{388}	—	October 8, 2012	Haleakala	Pan-STARRS 1	KOR	940 m	MPC · JPL
798614	2012 TJ_{390}	—	October 15, 2012	Mount Lemmon	Mount Lemmon Survey	·	1.7 km	MPC · JPL
798615	2012 TV_{390}	—	October 10, 2012	Mount Lemmon	Mount Lemmon Survey	EOS	1.1 km	MPC · JPL
798616	2012 TS_{393}	—	October 11, 2012	Haleakala	Pan-STARRS 1	·	1.3 km	MPC · JPL
798617	2012 TG_{395}	—	October 9, 2012	Haleakala	Pan-STARRS 1	·	1.9 km	MPC · JPL
798618	2012 TR_{395}	—	October 9, 2012	Mount Lemmon	Mount Lemmon Survey	·	1.4 km	MPC · JPL
798619	2012 TV_{395}	—	October 15, 2012	Mount Lemmon	Mount Lemmon Survey	HNS	820 m	MPC · JPL
798620	2012 TY_{404}	—	October 11, 2012	Haleakala	Pan-STARRS 1	·	1.9 km	MPC · JPL
798621	2012 TJ_{406}	—	October 8, 2012	Mount Lemmon	Mount Lemmon Survey	·	1.3 km	MPC · JPL
798622	2012 TW_{408}	—	October 10, 2012	Mount Lemmon	Mount Lemmon Survey	·	1.8 km	MPC · JPL
798623	2012 UA	—	October 9, 2012	Mount Lemmon	Mount Lemmon Survey	·	2.2 km	MPC · JPL
798624	2012 UK_{5}	—	October 16, 2012	Mount Lemmon	Mount Lemmon Survey	KOR	950 m	MPC · JPL
798625	2012 UF_{6}	—	October 1, 2005	Kitt Peak	Spacewatch	·	780 m	MPC · JPL
798626	2012 UN_{6}	—	October 16, 2012	Mount Lemmon	Mount Lemmon Survey	·	2.0 km	MPC · JPL
798627	2012 UX_{11}	—	October 16, 2012	Mount Lemmon	Mount Lemmon Survey	·	1.6 km	MPC · JPL
798628	2012 UH_{14}	—	August 15, 2004	Cerro Tololo	Deep Ecliptic Survey	·	760 m	MPC · JPL
798629	2012 UR_{15}	—	October 16, 2012	Mount Lemmon	Mount Lemmon Survey	·	1.4 km	MPC · JPL
798630	2012 UE_{16}	—	October 6, 2012	Mount Lemmon	Mount Lemmon Survey	·	1.8 km	MPC · JPL
798631	2012 UE_{19}	—	October 8, 2007	Mount Lemmon	Mount Lemmon Survey	EOS	1.2 km	MPC · JPL
798632	2012 UD_{20}	—	October 16, 2012	Mount Lemmon	Mount Lemmon Survey	·	1.8 km	MPC · JPL
798633	2012 UN_{28}	—	October 16, 2012	Kitt Peak	Spacewatch	·	780 m	MPC · JPL
798634	2012 UV_{36}	—	October 16, 2012	Mount Lemmon	Mount Lemmon Survey	·	1.6 km	MPC · JPL
798635	2012 UM_{42}	—	October 20, 2007	Kitt Peak	Spacewatch	KOR	940 m	MPC · JPL
798636	2012 UU_{47}	—	October 18, 2012	Haleakala	Pan-STARRS 1	·	1.4 km	MPC · JPL
798637	2012 UH_{51}	—	September 18, 2012	Mount Lemmon	Mount Lemmon Survey	·	1.6 km	MPC · JPL
798638	2012 UX_{56}	—	October 19, 2012	Haleakala	Pan-STARRS 1	·	1.2 km	MPC · JPL
798639	2012 UE_{59}	—	October 19, 2012	Haleakala	Pan-STARRS 1	·	2.0 km	MPC · JPL
798640	2012 UO_{76}	—	October 18, 2012	Haleakala	Pan-STARRS 1	·	1.7 km	MPC · JPL
798641	2012 UR_{79}	—	September 18, 2012	Mount Lemmon	Mount Lemmon Survey	T_{j} (2.99) · EUP	2.5 km	MPC · JPL
798642	2012 UK_{94}	—	October 17, 2012	Haleakala	Pan-STARRS 1	·	1.5 km	MPC · JPL
798643	2012 UW_{94}	—	December 21, 2005	Kitt Peak	Spacewatch	NYS	860 m	MPC · JPL
798644	2012 UA_{98}	—	October 16, 2012	Mount Lemmon	Mount Lemmon Survey	·	860 m	MPC · JPL
798645	2012 UO_{108}	—	December 29, 2008	Kitt Peak	Spacewatch	·	890 m	MPC · JPL
798646	2012 UH_{110}	—	October 21, 2012	Kitt Peak	Spacewatch	LIX	2.5 km	MPC · JPL
798647	2012 UF_{112}	—	October 21, 2012	Haleakala	Pan-STARRS 1	·	970 m	MPC · JPL
798648	2012 US_{124}	—	October 22, 2012	Haleakala	Pan-STARRS 1	EOS	1.3 km	MPC · JPL
798649	2012 UA_{139}	—	July 22, 2006	Mount Lemmon	Mount Lemmon Survey	·	2.4 km	MPC · JPL
798650	2012 UH_{150}	—	September 7, 2008	Mount Lemmon	Mount Lemmon Survey	NYS	890 m	MPC · JPL
798651	2012 UJ_{150}	—	October 13, 2012	Kitt Peak	Spacewatch	·	1.1 km	MPC · JPL
798652	2012 UE_{164}	—	September 21, 2008	Mount Lemmon	Mount Lemmon Survey	·	860 m	MPC · JPL
798653	2012 UA_{166}	—	May 26, 2006	Kitt Peak	Spacewatch	H	390 m	MPC · JPL
798654	2012 UH_{170}	—	October 6, 2012	Haleakala	Pan-STARRS 1	PHO	1.0 km	MPC · JPL
798655	2012 UN_{178}	—	October 17, 2012	Mount Lemmon	Mount Lemmon Survey	·	1.6 km	MPC · JPL
798656	2012 UT_{181}	—	October 18, 2012	Haleakala	Pan-STARRS 1	·	1.3 km	MPC · JPL
798657	2012 UH_{186}	—	October 21, 2012	Mount Lemmon	Mount Lemmon Survey	·	1.5 km	MPC · JPL
798658	2012 UR_{187}	—	October 22, 2012	Haleakala	Pan-STARRS 1	·	1.9 km	MPC · JPL
798659	2012 UR_{190}	—	October 21, 2012	Mount Lemmon	Mount Lemmon Survey	·	1.0 km	MPC · JPL
798660	2012 UY_{191}	—	October 22, 2012	Mount Lemmon	Mount Lemmon Survey	·	750 m	MPC · JPL
798661	2012 UT_{194}	—	September 23, 2008	Kitt Peak	Spacewatch	·	950 m	MPC · JPL
798662	2012 UZ_{194}	—	October 18, 2012	Haleakala	Pan-STARRS 1	·	1.3 km	MPC · JPL
798663	2012 UU_{201}	—	October 14, 2017	Mount Lemmon	Mount Lemmon Survey	·	1.7 km	MPC · JPL
798664	2012 UK_{202}	—	October 25, 2012	Mount Lemmon	Mount Lemmon Survey	EOS	1.2 km	MPC · JPL
798665	2012 UF_{203}	—	October 18, 2012	Haleakala	Pan-STARRS 1	EOS	1.1 km	MPC · JPL
798666	2012 UG_{203}	—	October 18, 2012	Haleakala	Pan-STARRS 1	·	1.4 km	MPC · JPL
798667	2012 UB_{204}	—	October 18, 2012	Haleakala	Pan-STARRS 1	THM	1.6 km	MPC · JPL
798668	2012 UL_{204}	—	October 18, 2012	Haleakala	Pan-STARRS 1	·	1.5 km	MPC · JPL
798669	2012 UU_{205}	—	October 18, 2012	Haleakala	Pan-STARRS 1	T_{j} (2.98)	1.7 km	MPC · JPL
798670	2012 UU_{206}	—	October 18, 2012	Haleakala	Pan-STARRS 1	THM	1.4 km	MPC · JPL
798671	2012 US_{209}	—	October 21, 2012	Mount Lemmon	Mount Lemmon Survey	·	1.4 km	MPC · JPL
798672	2012 UM_{210}	—	October 21, 2012	Kitt Peak	Spacewatch	·	1.8 km	MPC · JPL
798673	2012 UQ_{211}	—	October 21, 2012	Haleakala	Pan-STARRS 1	·	1.3 km	MPC · JPL
798674	2012 UT_{212}	—	October 18, 2012	Haleakala	Pan-STARRS 1	·	1.9 km	MPC · JPL
798675	2012 UU_{212}	—	October 18, 2012	Haleakala	Pan-STARRS 1	EOS	1.2 km	MPC · JPL
798676	2012 UD_{213}	—	October 18, 2012	Haleakala	Pan-STARRS 1	·	2.2 km	MPC · JPL
798677	2012 UQ_{214}	—	October 18, 2012	Haleakala	Pan-STARRS 1	·	1.7 km	MPC · JPL
798678	2012 UU_{215}	—	October 21, 2012	Haleakala	Pan-STARRS 1	·	1.3 km	MPC · JPL
798679	2012 UX_{215}	—	October 22, 2012	Haleakala	Pan-STARRS 1	·	1.5 km	MPC · JPL
798680	2012 UY_{217}	—	October 19, 2012	Mount Lemmon	Mount Lemmon Survey	·	1.2 km	MPC · JPL
798681	2012 UL_{218}	—	October 8, 2007	Mount Lemmon	Mount Lemmon Survey	·	1.4 km	MPC · JPL
798682	2012 UW_{218}	—	October 8, 2007	Mount Lemmon	Mount Lemmon Survey	·	1.3 km	MPC · JPL
798683	2012 UG_{220}	—	October 17, 2012	Mount Lemmon	Mount Lemmon Survey	·	1.4 km	MPC · JPL
798684	2012 UV_{220}	—	October 22, 2012	Mount Lemmon	Mount Lemmon Survey	·	880 m	MPC · JPL
798685	2012 UB_{221}	—	October 18, 2012	Haleakala	Pan-STARRS 1	·	1.1 km	MPC · JPL
798686	2012 UK_{222}	—	October 22, 2012	Mount Lemmon	Mount Lemmon Survey	·	2.2 km	MPC · JPL
798687	2012 UL_{225}	—	October 22, 2012	Mount Lemmon	Mount Lemmon Survey	·	2.4 km	MPC · JPL
798688	2012 UR_{228}	—	October 18, 2012	Haleakala	Pan-STARRS 1	·	1.5 km	MPC · JPL
798689	2012 UZ_{229}	—	October 18, 2012	Haleakala	Pan-STARRS 1	·	1.7 km	MPC · JPL
798690	2012 UQ_{230}	—	October 16, 2012	Mount Lemmon	Mount Lemmon Survey	·	2.7 km	MPC · JPL
798691	2012 UR_{230}	—	October 16, 2012	Mount Lemmon	Mount Lemmon Survey	MRX	890 m	MPC · JPL
798692	2012 UF_{232}	—	October 17, 2012	Mount Lemmon	Mount Lemmon Survey	·	2.1 km	MPC · JPL
798693	2012 UL_{233}	—	October 21, 2012	Haleakala	Pan-STARRS 1	·	1.2 km	MPC · JPL
798694	2012 UM_{234}	—	October 19, 2012	Mount Lemmon	Mount Lemmon Survey	·	1.2 km	MPC · JPL
798695	2012 UG_{237}	—	October 18, 2012	Mount Lemmon	Mount Lemmon Survey	EUN	730 m	MPC · JPL
798696	2012 UA_{239}	—	October 17, 2012	Mount Lemmon	Mount Lemmon Survey	·	1.3 km	MPC · JPL
798697	2012 UG_{242}	—	October 17, 2012	Haleakala	Pan-STARRS 1	·	1.1 km	MPC · JPL
798698	2012 UY_{242}	—	October 18, 2012	Haleakala	Pan-STARRS 1	·	1.4 km	MPC · JPL
798699	2012 UL_{249}	—	October 21, 2012	Kitt Peak	Spacewatch	·	1.6 km	MPC · JPL
798700	2012 UG_{250}	—	October 19, 2012	Mount Lemmon	Mount Lemmon Survey	EOS	1.4 km	MPC · JPL

== 798701–798800 ==
back to top

Designation			Discovery			Properties		Ref
Permanent	Provisional	Named after	Date	Site	Discoverer(s)	Category	Diam.	Ref
798701	2012 UA_{252}	—	October 22, 2012	Haleakala	Pan-STARRS 1	·	1.5 km	MPC · JPL
798702	2012 UG_{252}	—	October 21, 2012	Haleakala	Pan-STARRS 1	EOS	1.2 km	MPC · JPL
798703	2012 UC_{253}	—	October 17, 2012	Haleakala	Pan-STARRS 1	KOR	980 m	MPC · JPL
798704	2012 UB_{256}	—	October 17, 2012	Haleakala	Pan-STARRS 1	THM	1.9 km	MPC · JPL
798705	2012 UL_{259}	—	October 17, 2012	Mount Lemmon	Mount Lemmon Survey	·	2.0 km	MPC · JPL
798706	2012 UZ_{263}	—	October 18, 2012	Haleakala	Pan-STARRS 1	·	1.9 km	MPC · JPL
798707	2012 UF_{264}	—	October 18, 2012	Haleakala	Pan-STARRS 1	EOS	1.4 km	MPC · JPL
798708	2012 UM_{265}	—	October 22, 2012	Mount Lemmon	Mount Lemmon Survey	·	1.7 km	MPC · JPL
798709	2012 UF_{266}	—	October 16, 2012	Mount Lemmon	Mount Lemmon Survey	·	1.1 km	MPC · JPL
798710	2012 UU_{268}	—	October 17, 2012	Haleakala	Pan-STARRS 1	·	1.6 km	MPC · JPL
798711	2012 VB_{4}	—	October 6, 2012	Haleakala	Pan-STARRS 1	·	1.3 km	MPC · JPL
798712	2012 VA_{12}	—	November 4, 2012	Mount Lemmon	Mount Lemmon Survey	·	1.4 km	MPC · JPL
798713	2012 VF_{12}	—	October 18, 2012	Haleakala	Pan-STARRS 1	·	1.4 km	MPC · JPL
798714	2012 VB_{13}	—	October 18, 2012	Haleakala	Pan-STARRS 1	·	1.0 km	MPC · JPL
798715	2012 VM_{15}	—	November 4, 2012	Haleakala	Pan-STARRS 1	MAR	600 m	MPC · JPL
798716	2012 VX_{15}	—	November 5, 2012	Catalina	CSS	·	380 m	MPC · JPL
798717	2012 VX_{20}	—	October 22, 2012	Mount Lemmon	Mount Lemmon Survey	DOR	1.6 km	MPC · JPL
798718	2012 VL_{33}	—	September 23, 2012	Mount Lemmon	Mount Lemmon Survey	·	1.7 km	MPC · JPL
798719	2012 VP_{35}	—	October 21, 2012	Haleakala	Pan-STARRS 1	·	1.8 km	MPC · JPL
798720	2012 VS_{35}	—	October 20, 2012	Mount Lemmon	Mount Lemmon Survey	·	2.0 km	MPC · JPL
798721	2012 VB_{36}	—	September 6, 2008	Catalina	CSS	·	910 m	MPC · JPL
798722	2012 VD_{47}	—	September 26, 2003	Sacramento Peak	SDSS	·	1.1 km	MPC · JPL
798723	2012 VL_{50}	—	October 18, 2012	Haleakala	Pan-STARRS 1	·	730 m	MPC · JPL
798724	2012 VX_{54}	—	December 23, 2017	Haleakala	Pan-STARRS 1	·	1.0 km	MPC · JPL
798725	2012 VP_{61}	—	October 21, 2012	Haleakala	Pan-STARRS 1	·	1.3 km	MPC · JPL
798726	2012 VK_{62}	—	November 9, 2012	Cerro Burek	I. de la Cueva	H	350 m	MPC · JPL
798727	2012 VB_{67}	—	October 18, 2012	Haleakala	Pan-STARRS 1	·	1.3 km	MPC · JPL
798728	2012 VK_{67}	—	November 7, 2012	Mount Lemmon	Mount Lemmon Survey	·	1.1 km	MPC · JPL
798729	2012 VU_{83}	—	November 14, 2012	Kitt Peak	Spacewatch	·	1.1 km	MPC · JPL
798730	2012 VL_{94}	—	November 7, 2012	Catalina	CSS	AMO	330 m	MPC · JPL
798731	2012 VZ_{101}	—	October 22, 2012	Haleakala	Pan-STARRS 1	·	2.0 km	MPC · JPL
798732	2012 VC_{102}	—	November 12, 2012	Mount Lemmon	Mount Lemmon Survey	·	1.6 km	MPC · JPL
798733	2012 VP_{104}	—	October 15, 2012	Kitt Peak	Spacewatch	NYS	850 m	MPC · JPL
798734	2012 VY_{104}	—	January 27, 2006	Kitt Peak	Spacewatch	·	1.1 km	MPC · JPL
798735	2012 VL_{111}	—	October 17, 2012	Mount Lemmon	Mount Lemmon Survey	PHO	760 m	MPC · JPL
798736	2012 VV_{114}	—	November 14, 2012	Kitt Peak	Spacewatch	THM	2.0 km	MPC · JPL
798737 Faustina	2012 VZ_{114}	Faustina	November 13, 2012	Mount Graham	K. Černis, R. P. Boyle	·	2.8 km	MPC · JPL
798738	2012 VQ_{122}	—	November 12, 2012	Mount Lemmon	Mount Lemmon Survey	THM	1.5 km	MPC · JPL
798739	2012 VB_{123}	—	November 12, 2012	Mount Lemmon	Mount Lemmon Survey	·	2.0 km	MPC · JPL
798740	2012 VE_{125}	—	September 23, 2017	Haleakala	Pan-STARRS 1	KOR	1 km	MPC · JPL
798741	2012 VG_{127}	—	November 14, 2012	Kitt Peak	Spacewatch	·	1.2 km	MPC · JPL
798742	2012 VJ_{127}	—	November 6, 2012	Kitt Peak	Spacewatch	·	1.2 km	MPC · JPL
798743	2012 VD_{128}	—	November 6, 2012	Mount Lemmon	Mount Lemmon Survey	·	1.6 km	MPC · JPL
798744	2012 VE_{128}	—	November 12, 2012	Mount Lemmon	Mount Lemmon Survey	·	1.6 km	MPC · JPL
798745	2012 VE_{129}	—	November 14, 2012	Mount Lemmon	Mount Lemmon Survey	·	1.2 km	MPC · JPL
798746	2012 VH_{129}	—	November 4, 2012	Mount Lemmon	Mount Lemmon Survey	·	1.7 km	MPC · JPL
798747	2012 VV_{129}	—	November 8, 2012	Haleakala	Pan-STARRS 1	·	2.2 km	MPC · JPL
798748	2012 VB_{130}	—	November 12, 2012	Mount Lemmon	Mount Lemmon Survey	H	410 m	MPC · JPL
798749	2012 VX_{133}	—	November 5, 2012	Haleakala	Pan-STARRS 1	·	1.4 km	MPC · JPL
798750	2012 VA_{136}	—	November 12, 2012	Mount Lemmon	Mount Lemmon Survey	·	1.7 km	MPC · JPL
798751	2012 VC_{136}	—	November 13, 2012	Mount Lemmon	Mount Lemmon Survey	·	1.4 km	MPC · JPL
798752	2012 VD_{136}	—	November 13, 2012	ESA OGS	ESA OGS	·	1.9 km	MPC · JPL
798753	2012 VN_{137}	—	November 12, 2012	Mount Lemmon	Mount Lemmon Survey	KOR	880 m	MPC · JPL
798754	2012 VA_{140}	—	November 13, 2012	Mount Lemmon	Mount Lemmon Survey	·	2.1 km	MPC · JPL
798755	2012 VA_{141}	—	November 7, 2012	Haleakala	Pan-STARRS 1	·	2.0 km	MPC · JPL
798756	2012 VZ_{142}	—	November 2, 2012	Mount Lemmon	Mount Lemmon Survey	EOS	1.5 km	MPC · JPL
798757	2012 VD_{143}	—	October 17, 2007	Mount Lemmon	Mount Lemmon Survey	·	1.4 km	MPC · JPL
798758	2012 VK_{144}	—	November 7, 2012	Mount Lemmon	Mount Lemmon Survey	·	2.4 km	MPC · JPL
798759	2012 VZ_{146}	—	November 7, 2012	Haleakala	Pan-STARRS 1	·	1.7 km	MPC · JPL
798760	2012 WR_{2}	—	November 17, 2012	Mount Lemmon	Mount Lemmon Survey	·	1.7 km	MPC · JPL
798761	2012 WM_{3}	—	October 1, 2008	Catalina	CSS	·	1.1 km	MPC · JPL
798762	2012 WP_{7}	—	October 10, 2012	Mount Lemmon	Mount Lemmon Survey	EOS	1.6 km	MPC · JPL
798763	2012 WT_{7}	—	October 21, 2012	Haleakala	Pan-STARRS 1	·	940 m	MPC · JPL
798764	2012 WB_{14}	—	November 19, 2012	Kitt Peak	Spacewatch	HYG	1.9 km	MPC · JPL
798765	2012 WM_{19}	—	October 6, 2008	Mount Lemmon	Mount Lemmon Survey	·	890 m	MPC · JPL
798766	2012 WQ_{25}	—	October 27, 2012	Mount Lemmon	Mount Lemmon Survey	·	2.0 km	MPC · JPL
798767	2012 WU_{25}	—	October 9, 2012	Mount Lemmon	Mount Lemmon Survey	·	2.3 km	MPC · JPL
798768	2012 WD_{26}	—	November 7, 2012	Kitt Peak	Spacewatch	·	560 m	MPC · JPL
798769	2012 WN_{27}	—	November 23, 2012	Kitt Peak	Spacewatch	·	2.3 km	MPC · JPL
798770	2012 WL_{29}	—	November 14, 2012	Kitt Peak	Spacewatch	·	1.5 km	MPC · JPL
798771	2012 WE_{30}	—	November 17, 2012	Mount Lemmon	Mount Lemmon Survey	·	860 m	MPC · JPL
798772 Ledóchowska	2012 WH_{32}	Ledóchowska	November 20, 2012	Mount Graham	K. Černis, R. P. Boyle	·	1.6 km	MPC · JPL
798773	2012 WW_{32}	—	October 14, 2012	Mount Lemmon	Mount Lemmon Survey	·	960 m	MPC · JPL
798774	2012 WU_{34}	—	November 5, 2012	Kitt Peak	Spacewatch	·	2.5 km	MPC · JPL
798775	2012 WJ_{35}	—	November 26, 2012	Mount Lemmon	Mount Lemmon Survey	·	2.6 km	MPC · JPL
798776	2012 WC_{38}	—	November 26, 2012	Mount Lemmon	Mount Lemmon Survey	·	800 m	MPC · JPL
798777	2012 WH_{38}	—	November 23, 2012	Kitt Peak	Spacewatch	EOS	1.5 km	MPC · JPL
798778	2012 WR_{39}	—	November 19, 2012	Kitt Peak	Spacewatch	·	1.7 km	MPC · JPL
798779	2012 WC_{40}	—	October 26, 2012	Mount Lemmon	Mount Lemmon Survey	·	1.6 km	MPC · JPL
798780	2012 WP_{44}	—	November 20, 2012	Mount Lemmon	Mount Lemmon Survey	·	1.2 km	MPC · JPL
798781	2012 WU_{45}	—	November 26, 2012	Mount Lemmon	Mount Lemmon Survey	·	2.1 km	MPC · JPL
798782	2012 WE_{46}	—	November 24, 2012	Kitt Peak	Spacewatch	·	2.1 km	MPC · JPL
798783	2012 XA_{4}	—	November 6, 2012	Kitt Peak	Spacewatch	·	720 m	MPC · JPL
798784	2012 XR_{8}	—	November 7, 2012	Mount Lemmon	Mount Lemmon Survey	LIX	2.7 km	MPC · JPL
798785	2012 XO_{10}	—	October 18, 2012	Mount Lemmon	Mount Lemmon Survey	T_{j} (2.91)	2.2 km	MPC · JPL
798786	2012 XC_{13}	—	October 8, 2012	Mount Lemmon	Mount Lemmon Survey	·	2.1 km	MPC · JPL
798787	2012 XT_{14}	—	December 5, 2012	Mount Lemmon	Mount Lemmon Survey	·	1.7 km	MPC · JPL
798788	2012 XW_{14}	—	December 5, 2012	Mount Lemmon	Mount Lemmon Survey	·	1.8 km	MPC · JPL
798789	2012 XX_{15}	—	December 5, 2012	Mount Lemmon	Mount Lemmon Survey	EOS	1.4 km	MPC · JPL
798790	2012 XE_{17}	—	December 5, 2012	Catalina	CSS	AMO	320 m	MPC · JPL
798791	2012 XT_{18}	—	November 6, 2012	Kitt Peak	Spacewatch	THM	1.8 km	MPC · JPL
798792	2012 XB_{40}	—	December 20, 2007	Kitt Peak	Spacewatch	·	1.5 km	MPC · JPL
798793	2012 XM_{44}	—	December 3, 2012	Mount Lemmon	Mount Lemmon Survey	·	1.4 km	MPC · JPL
798794	2012 XQ_{45}	—	November 14, 2012	Mount Lemmon	Mount Lemmon Survey	·	1.5 km	MPC · JPL
798795	2012 XD_{51}	—	October 19, 2012	Haleakala	Pan-STARRS 1	·	1.5 km	MPC · JPL
798796	2012 XE_{59}	—	November 14, 2012	Mount Lemmon	Mount Lemmon Survey	EOS	1.3 km	MPC · JPL
798797	2012 XT_{59}	—	November 23, 2012	Kitt Peak	Spacewatch	·	1.2 km	MPC · JPL
798798	2012 XW_{65}	—	December 4, 2012	Mount Lemmon	Mount Lemmon Survey	BRG	1.1 km	MPC · JPL
798799	2012 XC_{68}	—	December 5, 2012	Mount Lemmon	Mount Lemmon Survey	·	1.1 km	MPC · JPL
798800	2012 XG_{81}	—	December 6, 2012	Mount Lemmon	Mount Lemmon Survey	·	1.7 km	MPC · JPL

== 798801–798900 ==
back to top

Designation			Discovery			Properties		Ref
Permanent	Provisional	Named after	Date	Site	Discoverer(s)	Category	Diam.	Ref
798801	2012 XR_{82}	—	November 7, 2012	Mount Lemmon	Mount Lemmon Survey	·	1.4 km	MPC · JPL
798802	2012 XC_{87}	—	November 22, 2012	Kitt Peak	Spacewatch	·	1.5 km	MPC · JPL
798803	2012 XH_{92}	—	January 2, 2009	Mount Lemmon	Mount Lemmon Survey	·	1.0 km	MPC · JPL
798804	2012 XJ_{92}	—	December 3, 2012	Mount Lemmon	Mount Lemmon Survey	·	2.3 km	MPC · JPL
798805	2012 XX_{97}	—	December 5, 2012	Mount Lemmon	Mount Lemmon Survey	EOS	1.2 km	MPC · JPL
798806	2012 XM_{98}	—	December 13, 2004	Kitt Peak	Spacewatch	·	970 m	MPC · JPL
798807	2012 XL_{100}	—	December 5, 2012	Mount Lemmon	Mount Lemmon Survey	·	2.0 km	MPC · JPL
798808	2012 XE_{103}	—	November 7, 2012	Kitt Peak	Spacewatch	TIR	2.0 km	MPC · JPL
798809	2012 XO_{108}	—	December 8, 2012	Mount Lemmon	Mount Lemmon Survey	·	1.8 km	MPC · JPL
798810	2012 XT_{119}	—	December 8, 2012	Kitt Peak	Spacewatch	·	3.2 km	MPC · JPL
798811	2012 XY_{121}	—	December 22, 2008	Mount Lemmon	Mount Lemmon Survey	·	1.2 km	MPC · JPL
798812	2012 XX_{123}	—	November 26, 2012	Mount Lemmon	Mount Lemmon Survey	·	2.1 km	MPC · JPL
798813	2012 XJ_{124}	—	December 9, 2012	Haleakala	Pan-STARRS 1	·	2.2 km	MPC · JPL
798814	2012 XB_{125}	—	December 9, 2012	Haleakala	Pan-STARRS 1	·	1.9 km	MPC · JPL
798815	2012 XH_{127}	—	December 10, 2012	Haleakala	Pan-STARRS 1	·	1.8 km	MPC · JPL
798816	2012 XW_{129}	—	December 11, 2012	Mount Lemmon	Mount Lemmon Survey	·	1.7 km	MPC · JPL
798817	2012 XG_{130}	—	December 11, 2012	Mount Lemmon	Mount Lemmon Survey	·	1.4 km	MPC · JPL
798818	2012 XN_{131}	—	November 14, 2012	Mount Lemmon	Mount Lemmon Survey	EOS	1.5 km	MPC · JPL
798819	2012 XR_{135}	—	November 14, 2012	Kitt Peak	Spacewatch	·	2.5 km	MPC · JPL
798820	2012 XY_{136}	—	November 23, 2012	Kitt Peak	Spacewatch	·	570 m	MPC · JPL
798821	2012 XM_{141}	—	December 3, 2012	Mount Lemmon	Mount Lemmon Survey	·	1.0 km	MPC · JPL
798822	2012 XH_{143}	—	December 3, 2012	Mount Lemmon	Mount Lemmon Survey	LIX	2.3 km	MPC · JPL
798823	2012 XS_{145}	—	December 4, 2012	Mount Lemmon	Mount Lemmon Survey	·	2.2 km	MPC · JPL
798824	2012 XS_{146}	—	September 16, 2006	Catalina	CSS	TIR	2.2 km	MPC · JPL
798825	2012 XN_{150}	—	November 26, 2012	Mount Lemmon	Mount Lemmon Survey	·	960 m	MPC · JPL
798826	2012 XB_{154}	—	December 12, 2012	Mount Lemmon	Mount Lemmon Survey	·	3.1 km	MPC · JPL
798827	2012 XZ_{161}	—	May 21, 2015	Haleakala	Pan-STARRS 1	·	1.7 km	MPC · JPL
798828	2012 XE_{162}	—	April 4, 2014	Mount Lemmon	Mount Lemmon Survey	·	1.2 km	MPC · JPL
798829	2012 XM_{162}	—	June 8, 2016	Haleakala	Pan-STARRS 1	EOS	1.5 km	MPC · JPL
798830	2012 XN_{162}	—	April 4, 2014	Haleakala	Pan-STARRS 1	·	1.7 km	MPC · JPL
798831	2012 XL_{163}	—	December 11, 2012	Épendes	P. Kocher	·	1.9 km	MPC · JPL
798832	2012 XO_{166}	—	December 10, 2012	Kitt Peak	Spacewatch	·	2.5 km	MPC · JPL
798833	2012 XA_{167}	—	July 19, 2015	Haleakala	Pan-STARRS 2	·	1.1 km	MPC · JPL
798834	2012 XJ_{167}	—	April 23, 2015	Haleakala	Pan-STARRS 1	EOS	1.2 km	MPC · JPL
798835	2012 XO_{167}	—	December 3, 2012	Mount Lemmon	Mount Lemmon Survey	·	2.0 km	MPC · JPL
798836	2012 XN_{168}	—	August 2, 2016	Haleakala	Pan-STARRS 1	·	1.4 km	MPC · JPL
798837	2012 XZ_{168}	—	December 4, 2012	Mount Lemmon	Mount Lemmon Survey	·	1.8 km	MPC · JPL
798838	2012 XM_{169}	—	December 12, 2012	Mount Lemmon	Mount Lemmon Survey	LIX	2.1 km	MPC · JPL
798839	2012 XE_{170}	—	December 9, 2012	Mount Lemmon	Mount Lemmon Survey	·	1.9 km	MPC · JPL
798840	2012 XF_{170}	—	December 4, 2012	Mount Lemmon	Mount Lemmon Survey	EOS	1.5 km	MPC · JPL
798841	2012 XM_{170}	—	December 13, 2012	Calar Alto	S. Mottola, S. Hellmich	LIX	2.5 km	MPC · JPL
798842	2012 XX_{170}	—	December 11, 2012	Mount Lemmon	Mount Lemmon Survey	·	2.1 km	MPC · JPL
798843	2012 XK_{172}	—	December 8, 2012	Mount Lemmon	Mount Lemmon Survey	·	1.1 km	MPC · JPL
798844	2012 XM_{178}	—	December 12, 2012	Mount Lemmon	Mount Lemmon Survey	JUN	870 m	MPC · JPL
798845	2012 XW_{179}	—	December 9, 2012	Haleakala	Pan-STARRS 1	EOS	1.3 km	MPC · JPL
798846	2012 XC_{180}	—	December 3, 2012	Mount Lemmon	Mount Lemmon Survey	·	1.4 km	MPC · JPL
798847	2012 XR_{181}	—	November 18, 2007	Mount Lemmon	Mount Lemmon Survey	·	1.8 km	MPC · JPL
798848	2012 YL_{2}	—	December 19, 2012	Oukaïmeden	M. Ory	·	1.5 km	MPC · JPL
798849	2012 YH_{4}	—	December 21, 2012	Mount Lemmon	Mount Lemmon Survey	·	1.9 km	MPC · JPL
798850	2012 YE_{9}	—	December 31, 2012	Haleakala	Pan-STARRS 1	·	1.3 km	MPC · JPL
798851	2012 YW_{10}	—	December 22, 2012	Haleakala	Pan-STARRS 1	·	2.3 km	MPC · JPL
798852	2012 YG_{11}	—	September 28, 2011	Mount Lemmon	Mount Lemmon Survey	·	1.6 km	MPC · JPL
798853	2012 YU_{12}	—	December 23, 2012	Haleakala	Pan-STARRS 1	LIX	2.9 km	MPC · JPL
798854	2012 YH_{13}	—	December 23, 2012	Haleakala	Pan-STARRS 1	·	1.0 km	MPC · JPL
798855	2012 YO_{13}	—	December 23, 2012	Haleakala	Pan-STARRS 1	·	980 m	MPC · JPL
798856	2012 YS_{13}	—	December 22, 2012	Haleakala	Pan-STARRS 1	·	2.1 km	MPC · JPL
798857	2012 YJ_{14}	—	August 2, 2016	Haleakala	Pan-STARRS 1	·	2.0 km	MPC · JPL
798858	2012 YR_{14}	—	December 21, 2012	Mount Lemmon	Mount Lemmon Survey	·	1.3 km	MPC · JPL
798859	2012 YJ_{15}	—	December 22, 2012	Haleakala	Pan-STARRS 1	·	2.5 km	MPC · JPL
798860	2012 YQ_{15}	—	December 21, 2012	Mount Lemmon	Mount Lemmon Survey	·	1.7 km	MPC · JPL
798861	2012 YS_{15}	—	December 22, 2012	Haleakala	Pan-STARRS 1	·	2.4 km	MPC · JPL
798862	2012 YS_{16}	—	December 23, 2012	Haleakala	Pan-STARRS 1	·	2.1 km	MPC · JPL
798863	2012 YP_{17}	—	December 23, 2012	Haleakala	Pan-STARRS 1	·	1.9 km	MPC · JPL
798864	2012 YC_{18}	—	December 23, 2012	Haleakala	Pan-STARRS 1	·	2.0 km	MPC · JPL
798865	2012 YK_{18}	—	December 23, 2012	Haleakala	Pan-STARRS 1	·	1.5 km	MPC · JPL
798866	2012 YJ_{21}	—	December 23, 2012	Haleakala	Pan-STARRS 1	·	2.4 km	MPC · JPL
798867	2012 YR_{23}	—	December 23, 2012	Haleakala	Pan-STARRS 1	L4	5.8 km	MPC · JPL
798868	2012 YB_{24}	—	December 23, 2012	Haleakala	Pan-STARRS 1	·	1.3 km	MPC · JPL
798869	2012 YT_{24}	—	December 23, 2012	Haleakala	Pan-STARRS 1	·	1.3 km	MPC · JPL
798870	2012 YC_{25}	—	December 22, 2012	Haleakala	Pan-STARRS 1	EUN	690 m	MPC · JPL
798871	2012 YM_{25}	—	December 21, 2012	Mount Lemmon	Mount Lemmon Survey	·	1.8 km	MPC · JPL
798872	2012 YN_{25}	—	December 21, 2012	Piszkés-tető	K. Sárneczky, G. Hodosán	·	1.4 km	MPC · JPL
798873	2012 YF_{26}	—	December 23, 2012	Haleakala	Pan-STARRS 1	·	2.3 km	MPC · JPL
798874	2012 YN_{26}	—	December 22, 2012	Haleakala	Pan-STARRS 1	·	2.4 km	MPC · JPL
798875	2012 YD_{27}	—	December 23, 2012	Haleakala	Pan-STARRS 1	·	1.9 km	MPC · JPL
798876	2012 YJ_{27}	—	December 23, 2012	Haleakala	Pan-STARRS 1	·	1.8 km	MPC · JPL
798877	2012 YX_{27}	—	December 22, 2012	Haleakala	Pan-STARRS 1	·	1.5 km	MPC · JPL
798878	2012 YZ_{27}	—	December 23, 2012	Haleakala	Pan-STARRS 1	·	1.4 km	MPC · JPL
798879	2013 AF_{11}	—	December 18, 2012	Oukaïmeden	M. Ory	·	2.6 km	MPC · JPL
798880	2013 AW_{12}	—	January 3, 2013	Mount Lemmon	Mount Lemmon Survey	·	1.1 km	MPC · JPL
798881	2013 AG_{16}	—	January 4, 2013	Mount Lemmon	Mount Lemmon Survey	·	1.3 km	MPC · JPL
798882	2013 AV_{26}	—	January 5, 2013	Mount Lemmon	Mount Lemmon Survey	·	2.7 km	MPC · JPL
798883	2013 AP_{34}	—	January 4, 2013	Mount Lemmon	Mount Lemmon Survey	EOS	1.2 km	MPC · JPL
798884	2013 AH_{35}	—	December 22, 2012	Haleakala	Pan-STARRS 1	TIR	1.8 km	MPC · JPL
798885	2013 AU_{42}	—	January 5, 2013	Mount Lemmon	Mount Lemmon Survey	·	1.1 km	MPC · JPL
798886	2013 AK_{44}	—	January 5, 2013	Mount Lemmon	Mount Lemmon Survey	·	2.5 km	MPC · JPL
798887	2013 AJ_{47}	—	December 12, 2012	Kitt Peak	Spacewatch	·	1.7 km	MPC · JPL
798888	2013 AJ_{49}	—	December 22, 2012	Haleakala	Pan-STARRS 1	·	2.0 km	MPC · JPL
798889	2013 AM_{49}	—	December 8, 2012	Kitt Peak	Spacewatch	T_{j} (2.96)	2.1 km	MPC · JPL
798890	2013 AO_{49}	—	January 8, 2013	Mount Lemmon	Mount Lemmon Survey	·	910 m	MPC · JPL
798891	2013 AB_{64}	—	January 8, 2013	SM Montmagastrell	Bosch, J. M., Olivera, R. M.	·	2.3 km	MPC · JPL
798892	2013 AX_{67}	—	January 9, 2013	La Silla	Barbieri, C.	·	2.3 km	MPC · JPL
798893	2013 AR_{69}	—	December 23, 2012	Haleakala	Pan-STARRS 1	TIR	2.2 km	MPC · JPL
798894	2013 AM_{80}	—	January 11, 2013	La Silla	Barbieri, C.	·	2.2 km	MPC · JPL
798895	2013 AG_{82}	—	December 23, 2012	Haleakala	Pan-STARRS 1	NYS	830 m	MPC · JPL
798896	2013 AJ_{87}	—	December 11, 2012	Kitt Peak	Spacewatch	·	1.1 km	MPC · JPL
798897	2013 AO_{93}	—	December 11, 2012	Kitt Peak	Spacewatch	·	950 m	MPC · JPL
798898	2013 AW_{94}	—	January 15, 2007	Mauna Kea	P. A. Wiegert	THM	1.5 km	MPC · JPL
798899	2013 AC_{102}	—	July 7, 2005	Mauna Kea	Veillet, C.	T_{j} (2.97)	2.2 km	MPC · JPL
798900	2013 AY_{106}	—	January 10, 2013	Haleakala	Pan-STARRS 1	·	1.9 km	MPC · JPL

== 798901–799000 ==
back to top

Designation			Discovery			Properties		Ref
Permanent	Provisional	Named after	Date	Site	Discoverer(s)	Category	Diam.	Ref
798901	2013 AK_{109}	—	January 10, 2013	Haleakala	Pan-STARRS 1	·	2.5 km	MPC · JPL
798902	2013 AX_{124}	—	January 15, 2013	ESA OGS	ESA OGS	·	1.1 km	MPC · JPL
798903	2013 AZ_{124}	—	January 15, 2013	ESA OGS	ESA OGS	·	1.4 km	MPC · JPL
798904	2013 AS_{128}	—	January 9, 2013	Catalina	CSS	·	2.0 km	MPC · JPL
798905	2013 AH_{129}	—	January 10, 2013	Haleakala	Pan-STARRS 1	·	2.2 km	MPC · JPL
798906	2013 AB_{130}	—	January 10, 2013	Haleakala	Pan-STARRS 1	NYS	850 m	MPC · JPL
798907	2013 AV_{138}	—	October 22, 2006	Kitt Peak	Spacewatch	THB	1.3 km	MPC · JPL
798908	2013 AC_{143}	—	January 4, 2013	Cerro Tololo	D. E. Trilling, R. L. Allen	·	1.6 km	MPC · JPL
798909	2013 AL_{143}	—	January 4, 2013	Cerro Tololo	D. E. Trilling, R. L. Allen	·	1.8 km	MPC · JPL
798910	2013 AV_{145}	—	January 4, 2013	Cerro Tololo	D. E. Trilling, R. L. Allen	TIR	1.7 km	MPC · JPL
798911	2013 AU_{146}	—	January 4, 2013	Cerro Tololo	D. E. Trilling, R. L. Allen	URS	1.9 km	MPC · JPL
798912	2013 AX_{147}	—	January 4, 2013	Cerro Tololo	D. E. Trilling, R. L. Allen	L4	5.7 km	MPC · JPL
798913	2013 AF_{148}	—	January 4, 2013	Cerro Tololo	D. E. Trilling, R. L. Allen	·	1.6 km	MPC · JPL
798914	2013 AG_{149}	—	January 4, 2013	Cerro Tololo	D. E. Trilling, R. L. Allen	·	1.8 km	MPC · JPL
798915	2013 AP_{149}	—	January 4, 2013	Cerro Tololo	D. E. Trilling, R. L. Allen	·	1.7 km	MPC · JPL
798916	2013 AV_{149}	—	December 12, 2012	Mount Lemmon	Mount Lemmon Survey	·	1.8 km	MPC · JPL
798917	2013 AO_{150}	—	January 4, 2013	Cerro Tololo	D. E. Trilling, R. L. Allen	L4	4.7 km	MPC · JPL
798918	2013 AZ_{155}	—	January 4, 2013	Cerro Tololo	D. E. Trilling, R. L. Allen	L4	6.3 km	MPC · JPL
798919	2013 AC_{157}	—	February 9, 2008	Kitt Peak	Spacewatch	(1118)	2.2 km	MPC · JPL
798920	2013 AU_{159}	—	February 10, 2013	Haleakala	Pan-STARRS 1	EUP	1.9 km	MPC · JPL
798921	2013 AR_{160}	—	February 10, 2013	Haleakala	Pan-STARRS 1	·	1.5 km	MPC · JPL
798922	2013 AK_{162}	—	January 4, 2013	Cerro Tololo	D. E. Trilling, R. L. Allen	·	1.9 km	MPC · JPL
798923	2013 AV_{162}	—	January 20, 2013	Mount Lemmon	Mount Lemmon Survey	PHO	720 m	MPC · JPL
798924	2013 AJ_{165}	—	January 4, 2013	Cerro Tololo	D. E. Trilling, R. L. Allen	·	1.8 km	MPC · JPL
798925	2013 AE_{166}	—	January 20, 2013	Mount Lemmon	Mount Lemmon Survey	·	2.3 km	MPC · JPL
798926	2013 AA_{167}	—	February 10, 2013	Haleakala	Pan-STARRS 1	T_{j} (2.96)	2.2 km	MPC · JPL
798927	2013 AO_{167}	—	January 20, 2013	Mount Lemmon	Mount Lemmon Survey	ELF	2.3 km	MPC · JPL
798928	2013 AB_{171}	—	January 4, 2013	Cerro Tololo	D. E. Trilling, R. L. Allen	·	2.5 km	MPC · JPL
798929	2013 AB_{181}	—	February 10, 2013	Haleakala	Pan-STARRS 1	·	2.1 km	MPC · JPL
798930	2013 AE_{181}	—	January 17, 2013	Haleakala	Pan-STARRS 1	·	1.6 km	MPC · JPL
798931	2013 AL_{181}	—	January 5, 2013	Cerro Tololo	D. E. Trilling, R. L. Allen	·	1.9 km	MPC · JPL
798932	2013 AR_{187}	—	September 23, 2011	Haleakala	Pan-STARRS 1	·	1.1 km	MPC · JPL
798933	2013 AL_{190}	—	January 10, 2013	Mount Lemmon	Mount Lemmon Survey	·	2.5 km	MPC · JPL
798934	2013 AJ_{191}	—	December 13, 2006	Mount Lemmon	Mount Lemmon Survey	THM	1.5 km	MPC · JPL
798935	2013 AD_{193}	—	October 12, 2017	Mount Lemmon	Mount Lemmon Survey	·	2.5 km	MPC · JPL
798936	2013 AO_{193}	—	January 10, 2013	Mount Lemmon	Mount Lemmon Survey	·	2.6 km	MPC · JPL
798937	2013 AY_{193}	—	January 7, 2013	Kitt Peak	Spacewatch	THB	2.1 km	MPC · JPL
798938	2013 AY_{194}	—	January 10, 2013	Haleakala	Pan-STARRS 1	·	1.8 km	MPC · JPL
798939	2013 AS_{196}	—	January 10, 2013	Haleakala	Pan-STARRS 1	·	930 m	MPC · JPL
798940	2013 AA_{197}	—	January 3, 2013	Mount Lemmon	Mount Lemmon Survey	·	1.1 km	MPC · JPL
798941	2013 AV_{198}	—	January 10, 2013	Haleakala	Pan-STARRS 1	·	2.0 km	MPC · JPL
798942	2013 AW_{198}	—	January 6, 2013	Mount Lemmon	Mount Lemmon Survey	VER	2.2 km	MPC · JPL
798943	2013 AY_{198}	—	January 13, 2013	Mount Lemmon	Mount Lemmon Survey	·	1.2 km	MPC · JPL
798944	2013 AL_{201}	—	January 10, 2013	Haleakala	Pan-STARRS 1	·	990 m	MPC · JPL
798945	2013 AT_{202}	—	January 6, 2013	Kitt Peak	Spacewatch	VER	1.9 km	MPC · JPL
798946	2013 AQ_{203}	—	January 10, 2013	Haleakala	Pan-STARRS 1	·	2.6 km	MPC · JPL
798947	2013 AV_{205}	—	January 10, 2013	Haleakala	Pan-STARRS 1	L4	6.0 km	MPC · JPL
798948	2013 AF_{207}	—	January 6, 2013	Kitt Peak	Spacewatch	·	1.1 km	MPC · JPL
798949	2013 AV_{207}	—	January 10, 2013	Haleakala	Pan-STARRS 1	EOS	1.2 km	MPC · JPL
798950	2013 AW_{207}	—	January 10, 2013	Haleakala	Pan-STARRS 1	·	2.1 km	MPC · JPL
798951	2013 AQ_{208}	—	January 8, 2013	Mount Lemmon	Mount Lemmon Survey	L4	6.3 km	MPC · JPL
798952	2013 AX_{209}	—	January 4, 2013	Kitt Peak	Spacewatch	EOS	1.4 km	MPC · JPL
798953	2013 AN_{210}	—	January 10, 2013	Haleakala	Pan-STARRS 1	·	1.5 km	MPC · JPL
798954	2013 AG_{223}	—	January 10, 2013	Haleakala	Pan-STARRS 1	L4	5.3 km	MPC · JPL
798955	2013 BG_{2}	—	January 16, 2013	Haleakala	Pan-STARRS 1	L4	5.8 km	MPC · JPL
798956	2013 BB_{4}	—	January 16, 2013	Mount Lemmon	Mount Lemmon Survey	·	1.9 km	MPC · JPL
798957	2013 BJ_{7}	—	January 16, 2013	Mount Lemmon	Mount Lemmon Survey	EOS	1.2 km	MPC · JPL
798958	2013 BH_{10}	—	January 16, 2013	Haleakala	Pan-STARRS 1	THM	1.3 km	MPC · JPL
798959	2013 BM_{10}	—	January 5, 2013	Kitt Peak	Spacewatch	·	1.1 km	MPC · JPL
798960	2013 BA_{11}	—	January 16, 2013	Haleakala	Pan-STARRS 1	·	1.8 km	MPC · JPL
798961	2013 BB_{16}	—	January 16, 2013	Haleakala	Pan-STARRS 1	L4	5.5 km	MPC · JPL
798962	2013 BJ_{17}	—	January 17, 2013	Haleakala	Pan-STARRS 1	L4	5.6 km	MPC · JPL
798963	2013 BH_{24}	—	January 17, 2013	Haleakala	Pan-STARRS 1	·	1.6 km	MPC · JPL
798964	2013 BJ_{30}	—	February 28, 2009	Mount Lemmon	Mount Lemmon Survey	·	1.0 km	MPC · JPL
798965	2013 BV_{33}	—	December 12, 2012	Kitt Peak	Spacewatch	(69559)	2.4 km	MPC · JPL
798966	2013 BE_{36}	—	January 17, 2013	Haleakala	Pan-STARRS 1	·	1.9 km	MPC · JPL
798967	2013 BG_{38}	—	January 17, 2013	Haleakala	Pan-STARRS 1	VER	1.9 km	MPC · JPL
798968	2013 BN_{44}	—	January 19, 2013	Mount Lemmon	Mount Lemmon Survey	·	2.4 km	MPC · JPL
798969	2013 BF_{46}	—	December 23, 2012	Haleakala	Pan-STARRS 1	KON	1.7 km	MPC · JPL
798970	2013 BP_{48}	—	January 5, 2013	Mount Lemmon	Mount Lemmon Survey	·	1.8 km	MPC · JPL
798971	2013 BS_{49}	—	December 23, 2012	Haleakala	Pan-STARRS 1	·	2.4 km	MPC · JPL
798972	2013 BA_{51}	—	January 16, 2013	Haleakala	Pan-STARRS 1	·	1.7 km	MPC · JPL
798973	2013 BJ_{51}	—	January 16, 2013	Haleakala	Pan-STARRS 1	·	2.4 km	MPC · JPL
798974	2013 BR_{53}	—	January 16, 2013	Haleakala	Pan-STARRS 1	·	1.5 km	MPC · JPL
798975	2013 BL_{69}	—	January 20, 2013	Kitt Peak	Spacewatch	·	1.4 km	MPC · JPL
798976	2013 BC_{71}	—	January 22, 2013	Haleakala	Pan-STARRS 1	·	2.1 km	MPC · JPL
798977	2013 BR_{74}	—	January 17, 2013	Haleakala	Pan-STARRS 1	·	1.3 km	MPC · JPL
798978	2013 BP_{79}	—	January 14, 2013	ESA OGS	ESA OGS	·	1.0 km	MPC · JPL
798979	2013 BD_{80}	—	January 17, 2013	Haleakala	Pan-STARRS 1	THB	2.2 km	MPC · JPL
798980	2013 BT_{82}	—	October 18, 2011	Mount Lemmon	Mount Lemmon Survey	3:2	3.4 km	MPC · JPL
798981	2013 BG_{83}	—	August 6, 2005	Palomar Mountain	NEAT	·	2.1 km	MPC · JPL
798982	2013 BX_{83}	—	January 18, 2013	Mount Lemmon	Mount Lemmon Survey	·	2.2 km	MPC · JPL
798983	2013 BW_{85}	—	January 17, 2013	Haleakala	Pan-STARRS 1	TIR	1.8 km	MPC · JPL
798984	2013 BG_{86}	—	October 29, 2017	Haleakala	Pan-STARRS 1	ELF	2.2 km	MPC · JPL
798985	2013 BP_{87}	—	January 16, 2013	Haleakala	Pan-STARRS 1	VER	1.9 km	MPC · JPL
798986	2013 BU_{88}	—	May 9, 2014	Haleakala	Pan-STARRS 1	·	2.2 km	MPC · JPL
798987	2013 BN_{89}	—	January 17, 2013	Mount Lemmon	Mount Lemmon Survey	THM	1.8 km	MPC · JPL
798988	2013 BW_{89}	—	April 1, 2016	Haleakala	Pan-STARRS 1	L4	6.0 km	MPC · JPL
798989	2013 BE_{90}	—	January 20, 2013	Mount Lemmon	Mount Lemmon Survey	L4	6.8 km	MPC · JPL
798990	2013 BH_{90}	—	November 11, 2016	Mount Lemmon	Mount Lemmon Survey	·	1.4 km	MPC · JPL
798991	2013 BQ_{90}	—	January 19, 2013	Kitt Peak	Spacewatch	L4	6.4 km	MPC · JPL
798992	2013 BX_{90}	—	January 31, 2013	Kitt Peak	Spacewatch	·	2.1 km	MPC · JPL
798993	2013 BD_{91}	—	November 18, 2017	Haleakala	Pan-STARRS 1	·	2.2 km	MPC · JPL
798994	2013 BM_{91}	—	January 16, 2013	Haleakala	Pan-STARRS 1	THM	1.6 km	MPC · JPL
798995	2013 BE_{92}	—	January 22, 2013	Mount Lemmon	Mount Lemmon Survey	·	2.4 km	MPC · JPL
798996	2013 BN_{93}	—	January 17, 2013	Haleakala	Pan-STARRS 1	·	2.3 km	MPC · JPL
798997	2013 BZ_{93}	—	January 18, 2013	Mount Lemmon	Mount Lemmon Survey	·	2.1 km	MPC · JPL
798998	2013 BD_{94}	—	January 16, 2013	Haleakala	Pan-STARRS 1	·	2.2 km	MPC · JPL
798999	2013 BN_{95}	—	January 22, 2013	Mount Lemmon	Mount Lemmon Survey	·	2.2 km	MPC · JPL
799000	2013 BW_{96}	—	January 16, 2013	Haleakala	Pan-STARRS 1	·	2.1 km	MPC · JPL

back to top

== Meaning of names ==
As minor planet discoveries are confirmed, they are given a permanent number by the IAU's Minor Planet Center (MPC), and the discoverers can then submit names for them, following the IAU's naming conventions. The list below concerns those minor planets in the specified number-range that have received names, and explains the meanings of those names.

Official naming citations of newly named small Solar System bodies are approved and published in a bulletin by IAU's Working Group for Small Bodies Nomenclature (WGSBN). Before May 2021, citations were published in MPC's Minor Planet Circulars for many decades. Recent citations can also be found on the JPL Small-Body Database (SBDB). Until his death in 2016, German astronomer Lutz D. Schmadel compiled these citations into the Dictionary of Minor Planet Names (DMP) and regularly updated the collection.

Based on Paul Herget's The Names of the Minor Planets, Schmadel also researched the unclear origin of numerous asteroids, most of which had been named prior to World War II. This article incorporates text from this source, which is in the public domain: SBDB New namings may only be added to this list below after official publication as the preannouncement of names is condemned. The WGSBN publishes a comprehensive guideline for the naming rules of non-cometary small Solar System bodies.

Named minor planet	Provisional	This minor planet was named for...	Ref · Catalog
798118 Todoque	2012 DA_{84}	Todoque, a beautiful small town located on La Palma, Canary Islands.	IAU · 798118
798737 Faustina	2012 VZ_{114}	Faustina Kowalska, Polish nun and mystic known for her visions of Jesus and the message of Divine Mercy. Her diary, Divine Mercy in My Soul, inspired the Divine Mercy devotion practiced worldwide.	IAU · 798737
798772 Ledóchowska	2012 WH_{32}	Ursula Ledóchowska (1865–1939), a Polish nun.	IAU · 798772
