= Meanings of minor-planet names: 157001–158000 =

As minor planet discoveries are confirmed, they are given a permanent number by the IAU's Minor Planet Center (MPC), and the discoverers can then submit names for them, following the IAU's naming conventions. The list below concerns those minor planets in the specified number-range that have received names, and explains the meanings of those names.

Official naming citations of newly named small Solar System bodies are approved and published in a bulletin by IAU's Working Group for Small Bodies Nomenclature (WGSBN). Before May 2021, citations were published in MPC's Minor Planet Circulars for many decades. Recent citations can also be found on the JPL Small-Body Database (SBDB). Until his death in 2016, German astronomer Lutz D. Schmadel compiled these citations into the Dictionary of Minor Planet Names (DMP) and regularly updated the collection.

Based on Paul Herget's The Names of the Minor Planets, Schmadel also researched the unclear origin of numerous asteroids, most of which had been named prior to World War II. This article incorporates text from this source, which is in the public domain: SBDB New namings may only be added to this list below after official publication as the preannouncement of names is condemned. The WGSBN publishes a comprehensive guideline for the naming rules of non-cometary small Solar System bodies.

== 157001–157100 ==
Named minor planet	Provisional	This minor planet was named for...	Ref · Catalog
157015 Walterstraube	2003 QL_{47}	Johann Walter Straube (born 1937), a founding father of astronomy in Namibia.	JPL · 157015
157020 Fertőszentmiklós	2003 QV_{68}	Fertőszentmiklós is a small city in Győr-Moson-Sopron county, Hungary, and the birthplace of the second discoverer	JPL · 157020
157064 Sedona	2003 SQ_{216}	Sedona is a city located in northern Arizona, known mainly for scenic beauty of its red sandstone formations at the south end of the Oak Creek Canyon.	JPL · 157064

== 157101–157200 ==
back to top

Named minor planet	Provisional	This minor planet was named for...	Ref · Catalog
157141 Sopron	2004 PO_{1}	The city of Sopron in Hungary, birthplace of astronomer Tamás Szalai who co-discovered this minor planet	JPL · 157141
157194 Saddlemyer	2004 QR_{16}	Leslie K. Saddlemyer (born 1959), Canadian systems engineer at the Herzberg Institute of Astrophysics, National Research Council of Canada, project manager for the Gemini Planetary Imager	JPL · 157194

== 157201–157300 ==
back to top

Named minor planet	Provisional	This minor planet was named for...	Ref · Catalog
157258 Leach	2004 RL_{165}	Sidney Leach (born 1951) and Gloria Leach (born 1958) have spread their enthusiasm for astronomy around young people for years in schools and public events	JPL · 157258
157271 Gurtovenko	2004 RK_{222}	Ernest Andriyovych Gurtovenko (1928–1994), a Ukrainian astronomer and founder of the Kyiv school of the solar spectrography	JPL · 157271

== 157301–157400 ==
back to top

Named minor planet	Provisional	This minor planet was named for...	Ref · Catalog
157301 Loreena	2004 SE_{20}	Loreena McKennitt (born 1957), Canadian singer, composer and instrumentalist	JPL · 157301
157332 Lynette	2004 TL_{20}	Donna Lynette Wells (born 1965), wife of the American astronomer Don J. Wells who discovered this minor planet	JPL · 157332
157396 Vansevičius	2004 TM_{216}	Vladas Vansevicius (born 1958) is a professor at the Astronomical Observatory of Vilnius University and an expert in extragalactic astronomy, astrochemistry, galactic structure and multicolor photometry of stars and star clusters. He is an author of more than 120 scientific papers and many popular science articles.	JPL · 157396

== 157401–157500 ==
back to top

Named minor planet	Provisional	This minor planet was named for...	Ref · Catalog
157421 Carolpercy	2004 TX_{299}	Carol Percy (born 1964), Canadian professor of English	JPL · 157421
157456 Pivatte	2004 WT_{2}	"Pivatte" is the name of the house of the discoverer Michel Ory, located in Delémont, Switzerland, from where he made his first discovery using a remote telescope at Tenagra Observatory in the United States	JPL · 157456
157473 Emuno	2005 QH	"Em Uno", Spanish spelling of "M1", a group of Spanish amateur astronomers	JPL · 157473
157491 Rüdigerkollar	2005 RD_{22}	Rüdiger Kollar (1925–2005), German astronomer and founder of the discovering Radebeul Public Observatory (German: Sternwarte "Adolph Diesterweg" Radebeul)	JPL · 157491
157494 Durham	2005 RK_{28}	Steve Durham (born 1951) and his wife Marge (born 1948) have worked tirelessly to promote astronomy to people living in the Adirondack Mountains	JPL · 157494

== 157501–157600 ==
back to top

Named minor planet	Provisional	This minor planet was named for...	Ref · Catalog
157533 Stellamarie	2005 TL_{49}	Stella Marie Ries (born 2008), the niece of the discoverer Wolfgang Ries	JPL · 157533
157534 Siauliai	2005 TZ_{49}	Šiauliai, a city in Lithuania	JPL · 157534
157541 Wachter	2005 UN_{8}	Manfred Wachter (1938–2000) was a German telescope maker. He founded his company in 1963 in Stuttgart-Uhlbach and later moved to Bodelshausen. He was well known for his folded refractors with apertures of 100 mm to 230 mm, using lenses made by Dieter Lichtenknecker.	JPL · 157541
157599 Verdery	2005 VK_{93}	Roy Verdery III (b. 1947), an American physician and scientist	IAU · 157599

== 157601–157700 ==
back to top

Named minor planet	Provisional	This minor planet was named for...	Ref · Catalog
157640 Baumeler	2005 XS_{80}	Martin Baumeler (born 1936), Swiss artisan who helped with the Observatoire Robert-A. Naef, the discovery site	JPL · 157640
157693 Amandamarty	2006 AB	Amanda Nicole Zawada (born 1987) and Martin Peter Mackinlay (born 1988) are geologists in Brisbane, Australia.	JPL · 157693

== 157701–157800 ==
back to top

Named minor planet	Provisional	This minor planet was named for...	Ref · Catalog
157721 Kölcsey	2006 BS_{26}	Ferenc Kölcsey (1790–1838), a Hungarian poet, politician and language reformer.	IAU · 157721
157747 Mandryka	2006 CS_{9}	Nikita Mandryka (1940–2021), Tunisian-French cartoonist, creator of the Concombre masqué	JPL · 157747

== 157801–157900 ==
back to top

Named minor planet	Provisional	This minor planet was named for...	Ref · Catalog
157825 Zejda	1997 RE_{8}	Miloslav Zejda, Czech stellar astronomer and associate professor at the Masaryk University in Brno.	JPL · 157825
157894 Yasminwalter	1999 TK_{16}	Yasmin Angélique Walter (1965–2024), German amateur astronomer involved in astronomical public education.	JPL · 157894

== 157901–158000 ==
back to top

Named minor planet	Provisional	This minor planet was named for...	Ref · Catalog
There are no named minor planets in this number range

back to top

Preceded by 156,001–157,000	Meanings of minor-planet names List of minor planets: 157,001–158,000	Succeeded by 158,001–159,000
