= List of minor planets: 157001–158000 =

The following is a partial list of minor planets, running from minor-planet number 157001 through 158000, inclusive. The primary data for this and other partial lists is based on JPL's "Small-Body Orbital Elements" and data available from the Minor Planet Center. Critical list information is also provided by the MPC, unless otherwise specified from Lowell Observatory. A detailed description of the table's columns and additional sources are given on the main page including a complete list of every page in this series, and a statistical break-up on the dynamical classification of minor planets.

Also see the summary list of all named bodies in numerical and alphabetical order, and the corresponding naming citations for the number range of this particular list. New namings may only be added to this list after official publication, as the preannouncement of names is condemned by the Working Group for Small Bodies Nomenclature of the International Astronomical Union.

Near-Earth obj.	MBA (inner)	MBA (outer)	Centaur
Mars-crosser	MBA (middle)	Jupiter trojan	Trans-Neptunian obj.
Unclassified

== 157001–157100 ==
Designation			Discovery			Properties		Ref
Permanent	Provisional	Named after	Date	Site	Discoverer(s)	Category	Diam.	Ref
157001	2003 OU_{24}	—	July 24, 2003	Palomar	NEAT	·	3.1 km	MPC · JPL
157002	2003 OZ_{29}	—	July 24, 2003	Palomar	NEAT	·	4.3 km	MPC · JPL
157003	2003 OE_{30}	—	July 24, 2003	Palomar	NEAT	·	3.5 km	MPC · JPL
157004	2003 OB_{33}	—	July 25, 2003	Socorro	LINEAR	·	3.7 km	MPC · JPL
157005	2003 PG_{4}	—	August 3, 2003	Haleakala	NEAT	·	2.2 km	MPC · JPL
157006	2003 QH_{3}	—	August 19, 2003	Campo Imperatore	CINEOS	·	4.9 km	MPC · JPL
157007	2003 QZ_{6}	—	August 20, 2003	Campo Imperatore	CINEOS	·	4.3 km	MPC · JPL
157008	2003 QR_{11}	—	August 21, 2003	Haleakala	NEAT	·	5.3 km	MPC · JPL
157009	2003 QW_{18}	—	August 22, 2003	Socorro	LINEAR	HYG	4.6 km	MPC · JPL
157010	2003 QY_{32}	—	August 21, 2003	Campo Imperatore	CINEOS	·	4.0 km	MPC · JPL
157011	2003 QX_{37}	—	August 22, 2003	Socorro	LINEAR	EOS	3.7 km	MPC · JPL
157012	2003 QC_{38}	—	August 22, 2003	Socorro	LINEAR	THM	3.9 km	MPC · JPL
157013	2003 QH_{41}	—	August 22, 2003	Socorro	LINEAR	·	4.5 km	MPC · JPL
157014	2003 QO_{46}	—	August 23, 2003	Socorro	LINEAR	T_{j} (2.87)	11 km	MPC · JPL
157015 Walterstraube	2003 QL_{47}	Walterstraube	August 25, 2003	Drebach	~Knöfel, A., G. Lehmann	·	5.4 km	MPC · JPL
157016	2003 QL_{52}	—	August 23, 2003	Socorro	LINEAR	·	5.3 km	MPC · JPL
157017	2003 QX_{53}	—	August 23, 2003	Socorro	LINEAR	·	4.1 km	MPC · JPL
157018	2003 QD_{56}	—	August 23, 2003	Socorro	LINEAR	·	4.0 km	MPC · JPL
157019	2003 QX_{58}	—	August 23, 2003	Palomar	NEAT	·	6.4 km	MPC · JPL
157020 Fertőszentmiklós	2003 QV_{68}	Fertőszentmiklós	August 26, 2003	Piszkéstető	K. Sárneczky, B. Sipőcz	·	3.3 km	MPC · JPL
157021	2003 QA_{69}	—	August 25, 2003	Reedy Creek	J. Broughton	EOS	4.5 km	MPC · JPL
157022	2003 QA_{77}	—	August 24, 2003	Socorro	LINEAR	TIR	4.3 km	MPC · JPL
157023	2003 QM_{80}	—	August 22, 2003	Palomar	NEAT	·	3.4 km	MPC · JPL
157024	2003 QN_{86}	—	August 25, 2003	Palomar	NEAT	TIR	3.9 km	MPC · JPL
157025	2003 QW_{88}	—	August 25, 2003	Socorro	LINEAR	T_{j} (2.98) · HIL · 3:2	13 km	MPC · JPL
157026	2003 QW_{93}	—	August 28, 2003	Haleakala	NEAT	·	3.5 km	MPC · JPL
157027	2003 QQ_{95}	—	August 30, 2003	Socorro	LINEAR	fast	6.6 km	MPC · JPL
157028	2003 QH_{103}	—	August 31, 2003	Haleakala	NEAT	CYB	7.7 km	MPC · JPL
157029	2003 QE_{104}	—	August 31, 2003	Haleakala	NEAT	·	4.5 km	MPC · JPL
157030	2003 QM_{106}	—	August 31, 2003	Kitt Peak	Spacewatch	·	6.4 km	MPC · JPL
157031	2003 QO_{109}	—	August 31, 2003	Socorro	LINEAR	EOS	5.8 km	MPC · JPL
157032	2003 RE_{4}	—	September 1, 2003	Socorro	LINEAR	TIR	3.7 km	MPC · JPL
157033	2003 SU_{12}	—	September 16, 2003	Kitt Peak	Spacewatch	·	3.0 km	MPC · JPL
157034	2003 SX_{12}	—	September 16, 2003	Kitt Peak	Spacewatch	·	5.4 km	MPC · JPL
157035	2003 SV_{17}	—	September 17, 2003	Kitt Peak	Spacewatch	·	7.6 km	MPC · JPL
157036	2003 SG_{23}	—	September 16, 2003	Haleakala	NEAT	HYG	5.8 km	MPC · JPL
157037	2003 SV_{25}	—	September 17, 2003	Haleakala	NEAT	·	5.0 km	MPC · JPL
157038	2003 SW_{32}	—	September 18, 2003	Socorro	LINEAR	HYG	5.4 km	MPC · JPL
157039	2003 SQ_{34}	—	September 18, 2003	Palomar	NEAT	·	6.2 km	MPC · JPL
157040	2003 SA_{37}	—	September 19, 2003	Kitt Peak	Spacewatch	·	5.8 km	MPC · JPL
157041	2003 SC_{37}	—	September 16, 2003	Palomar	NEAT	·	5.8 km	MPC · JPL
157042	2003 SK_{44}	—	September 16, 2003	Anderson Mesa	LONEOS	·	7.0 km	MPC · JPL
157043	2003 ST_{44}	—	September 16, 2003	Anderson Mesa	LONEOS	·	6.6 km	MPC · JPL
157044	2003 SN_{51}	—	September 18, 2003	Palomar	NEAT	·	6.0 km	MPC · JPL
157045	2003 SZ_{53}	—	September 16, 2003	Kitt Peak	Spacewatch	·	5.4 km	MPC · JPL
157046	2003 SY_{56}	—	September 16, 2003	Kitt Peak	Spacewatch	HYG	4.5 km	MPC · JPL
157047	2003 SG_{80}	—	September 19, 2003	Haleakala	NEAT	·	6.9 km	MPC · JPL
157048	2003 SE_{90}	—	September 18, 2003	Socorro	LINEAR	·	2.6 km	MPC · JPL
157049	2003 SE_{119}	—	September 16, 2003	Palomar	NEAT	·	8.2 km	MPC · JPL
157050	2003 SB_{123}	—	September 18, 2003	Socorro	LINEAR	·	4.3 km	MPC · JPL
157051	2003 SY_{123}	—	September 18, 2003	Palomar	NEAT	·	6.0 km	MPC · JPL
157052	2003 SH_{138}	—	September 19, 2003	Socorro	LINEAR	·	6.6 km	MPC · JPL
157053	2003 SJ_{139}	—	September 18, 2003	Socorro	LINEAR	·	4.2 km	MPC · JPL
157054	2003 SB_{147}	—	September 20, 2003	Palomar	NEAT	·	7.1 km	MPC · JPL
157055	2003 ST_{149}	—	September 17, 2003	Socorro	LINEAR	HYG	4.1 km	MPC · JPL
157056	2003 SJ_{153}	—	September 19, 2003	Anderson Mesa	LONEOS	·	4.6 km	MPC · JPL
157057	2003 SO_{156}	—	September 19, 2003	Anderson Mesa	LONEOS	·	4.5 km	MPC · JPL
157058	2003 ST_{166}	—	September 21, 2003	Socorro	LINEAR	·	5.7 km	MPC · JPL
157059	2003 SR_{188}	—	September 22, 2003	Anderson Mesa	LONEOS	·	5.0 km	MPC · JPL
157060	2003 SZ_{199}	—	September 21, 2003	Anderson Mesa	LONEOS	CYB	6.8 km	MPC · JPL
157061	2003 SP_{201}	—	September 26, 2003	Desert Eagle	W. K. Y. Yeung	THM	3.8 km	MPC · JPL
157062	2003 SU_{209}	—	September 25, 2003	Haleakala	NEAT	·	4.1 km	MPC · JPL
157063	2003 SJ_{211}	—	September 24, 2003	Haleakala	NEAT	·	5.9 km	MPC · JPL
157064 Sedona	2003 SQ_{216}	Sedona	September 26, 2003	Kleť	KLENOT	·	5.8 km	MPC · JPL
157065	2003 SK_{232}	—	September 24, 2003	Haleakala	NEAT	·	6.9 km	MPC · JPL
157066	2003 SL_{247}	—	September 26, 2003	Socorro	LINEAR	THM	6.9 km	MPC · JPL
157067	2003 SV_{249}	—	September 26, 2003	Socorro	LINEAR	·	4.5 km	MPC · JPL
157068	2003 ST_{266}	—	September 29, 2003	Socorro	LINEAR	THM	3.8 km	MPC · JPL
157069	2003 SR_{304}	—	September 17, 2003	Palomar	NEAT	·	4.9 km	MPC · JPL
157070	2003 SG_{307}	—	September 26, 2003	Socorro	LINEAR	·	8.7 km	MPC · JPL
157071	2003 TR_{3}	—	October 1, 2003	Socorro	LINEAR	·	7.0 km	MPC · JPL
157072	2003 UM_{7}	—	October 18, 2003	Kingsnake	J. V. McClusky	EOS	3.3 km	MPC · JPL
157073	2003 UL_{56}	—	October 19, 2003	Goodricke-Pigott	R. A. Tucker	CYB	7.9 km	MPC · JPL
157074	2003 UE_{61}	—	October 16, 2003	Palomar	NEAT	EUP	9.2 km	MPC · JPL
157075	2003 UR_{280}	—	October 27, 2003	Haleakala	NEAT	·	6.8 km	MPC · JPL
157076	2003 UT_{281}	—	October 29, 2003	Anderson Mesa	LONEOS	3:2	8.0 km	MPC · JPL
157077	2003 UO_{294}	—	October 16, 2003	Palomar	NEAT	HYG	5.8 km	MPC · JPL
157078	2003 WQ_{31}	—	November 18, 2003	Palomar	NEAT	CYB	6.5 km	MPC · JPL
157079	2003 WB_{98}	—	November 19, 2003	Anderson Mesa	LONEOS	H	1.4 km	MPC · JPL
157080	2003 YG_{1}	—	December 17, 2003	Socorro	LINEAR	H	800 m	MPC · JPL
157081	2003 YL_{146}	—	December 28, 2003	Socorro	LINEAR	H	930 m	MPC · JPL
157082	2004 CW_{50}	—	February 11, 2004	Palomar	NEAT	·	1.4 km	MPC · JPL
157083	2004 CY_{51}	—	February 14, 2004	Socorro	LINEAR	H	800 m	MPC · JPL
157084	2004 CP_{114}	—	February 11, 2004	Socorro	LINEAR	H	1.1 km	MPC · JPL
157085	2004 EA_{2}	—	March 12, 2004	Palomar	NEAT	·	1.2 km	MPC · JPL
157086	2004 EQ_{10}	—	March 15, 2004	Desert Eagle	W. K. Y. Yeung	·	2.7 km	MPC · JPL
157087	2004 EH_{57}	—	March 15, 2004	Palomar	NEAT	H	1.1 km	MPC · JPL
157088	2004 ER_{74}	—	March 13, 2004	Palomar	NEAT	·	1.1 km	MPC · JPL
157089	2004 ET_{115}	—	March 14, 2004	Kitt Peak	Spacewatch	·	1.8 km	MPC · JPL
157090	2004 FU_{1}	—	March 17, 2004	Socorro	LINEAR	·	1.5 km	MPC · JPL
157091	2004 FZ_{36}	—	March 16, 2004	Campo Imperatore	CINEOS	·	1.2 km	MPC · JPL
157092	2004 FS_{107}	—	March 22, 2004	Socorro	LINEAR	·	1.1 km	MPC · JPL
157093	2004 GT_{40}	—	April 12, 2004	Kitt Peak	Spacewatch	·	1.3 km	MPC · JPL
157094	2004 HX_{10}	—	April 17, 2004	Palomar	NEAT	·	1.7 km	MPC · JPL
157095	2004 HD_{18}	—	April 17, 2004	Socorro	LINEAR	·	1.4 km	MPC · JPL
157096	2004 HQ_{32}	—	April 20, 2004	Socorro	LINEAR	·	1.4 km	MPC · JPL
157097	2004 HR_{52}	—	April 24, 2004	Kitt Peak	Spacewatch	·	1.3 km	MPC · JPL
157098	2004 HN_{61}	—	April 25, 2004	Kitt Peak	Spacewatch	·	910 m	MPC · JPL
157099	2004 HC_{62}	—	April 26, 2004	Siding Spring	SSS	·	3.3 km	MPC · JPL
157100	2004 JV_{9}	—	May 13, 2004	Kitt Peak	Spacewatch	·	920 m	MPC · JPL

== 157101–157200 ==
back to top

Designation			Discovery			Properties		Ref
Permanent	Provisional	Named after	Date	Site	Discoverer(s)	Category	Diam.	Ref
157101	2004 JL_{14}	—	May 9, 2004	Kitt Peak	Spacewatch	·	1.2 km	MPC · JPL
157102	2004 JU_{14}	—	May 9, 2004	Kitt Peak	Spacewatch	·	1.0 km	MPC · JPL
157103	2004 JG_{16}	—	May 11, 2004	Anderson Mesa	LONEOS	·	1.1 km	MPC · JPL
157104	2004 JS_{33}	—	May 15, 2004	Socorro	LINEAR	·	1.3 km	MPC · JPL
157105	2004 JV_{33}	—	May 15, 2004	Socorro	LINEAR	·	1.4 km	MPC · JPL
157106	2004 JQ_{35}	—	May 15, 2004	Socorro	LINEAR	·	2.6 km	MPC · JPL
157107	2004 JY_{35}	—	May 15, 2004	Socorro	LINEAR	·	1.7 km	MPC · JPL
157108	2004 LF_{5}	—	June 12, 2004	Catalina	CSS	·	1.3 km	MPC · JPL
157109	2004 LU_{7}	—	June 11, 2004	Socorro	LINEAR	·	1.3 km	MPC · JPL
157110	2004 LG_{11}	—	June 10, 2004	Campo Imperatore	CINEOS	·	1.4 km	MPC · JPL
157111	2004 LU_{23}	—	June 15, 2004	Socorro	LINEAR	·	1.8 km	MPC · JPL
157112	2004 LH_{25}	—	June 15, 2004	Socorro	LINEAR	·	1.2 km	MPC · JPL
157113	2004 LW_{25}	—	June 15, 2004	Socorro	LINEAR	·	2.3 km	MPC · JPL
157114	2004 LX_{25}	—	June 15, 2004	Kitt Peak	Spacewatch	V	1.2 km	MPC · JPL
157115	2004 LF_{27}	—	June 12, 2004	Palomar	NEAT	V	1.1 km	MPC · JPL
157116	2004 MG_{1}	—	June 16, 2004	Socorro	LINEAR	·	2.5 km	MPC · JPL
157117	2004 MC_{7}	—	June 22, 2004	Kitt Peak	Spacewatch	·	2.0 km	MPC · JPL
157118	2004 NT	—	July 7, 2004	Campo Imperatore	CINEOS	·	1.9 km	MPC · JPL
157119	2004 NF_{2}	—	July 9, 2004	Siding Spring	SSS	·	1.7 km	MPC · JPL
157120	2004 NH_{4}	—	July 11, 2004	Socorro	LINEAR	·	1.3 km	MPC · JPL
157121	2004 NC_{5}	—	July 9, 2004	Socorro	LINEAR	·	2.4 km	MPC · JPL
157122	2004 NG_{5}	—	July 9, 2004	Palomar	NEAT	NYS	1.6 km	MPC · JPL
157123	2004 NW_{5}	—	July 11, 2004	Socorro	LINEAR	·	1.4 km	MPC · JPL
157124	2004 NJ_{13}	—	July 11, 2004	Socorro	LINEAR	V	1.1 km	MPC · JPL
157125	2004 NQ_{15}	—	July 11, 2004	Socorro	LINEAR	NYS	1.8 km	MPC · JPL
157126	2004 NA_{17}	—	July 11, 2004	Socorro	LINEAR	NYS	1.9 km	MPC · JPL
157127	2004 NM_{17}	—	July 11, 2004	Socorro	LINEAR	PHO	3.4 km	MPC · JPL
157128	2004 NQ_{20}	—	July 14, 2004	Socorro	LINEAR	·	2.3 km	MPC · JPL
157129	2004 NT_{20}	—	July 14, 2004	Socorro	LINEAR	·	1.1 km	MPC · JPL
157130	2004 NZ_{24}	—	July 15, 2004	Socorro	LINEAR	EUN	2.6 km	MPC · JPL
157131	2004 NG_{25}	—	July 15, 2004	Socorro	LINEAR	·	5.4 km	MPC · JPL
157132	2004 NS_{26}	—	July 11, 2004	Socorro	LINEAR	·	1.7 km	MPC · JPL
157133	2004 NX_{30}	—	July 9, 2004	Anderson Mesa	LONEOS	·	1.7 km	MPC · JPL
157134	2004 OR	—	July 17, 2004	7300 Observatory	W. K. Y. Yeung	·	960 m	MPC · JPL
157135	2004 OC_{3}	—	July 16, 2004	Socorro	LINEAR	·	1.5 km	MPC · JPL
157136	2004 OD_{3}	—	July 16, 2004	Socorro	LINEAR	NYS	2.1 km	MPC · JPL
157137	2004 OY_{4}	—	July 16, 2004	Socorro	LINEAR	·	1.3 km	MPC · JPL
157138	2004 OU_{5}	—	July 17, 2004	Reedy Creek	J. Broughton	ERI	3.0 km	MPC · JPL
157139	2004 OE_{11}	—	July 25, 2004	Anderson Mesa	LONEOS	·	1.5 km	MPC · JPL
157140	2004 OG_{11}	—	July 25, 2004	Anderson Mesa	LONEOS	V	1.1 km	MPC · JPL
157141 Sopron	2004 PO_{1}	Sopron	August 6, 2004	Piszkéstető	K. Sárneczky, Szalai, T.	·	2.1 km	MPC · JPL
157142	2004 PV_{1}	—	August 6, 2004	Reedy Creek	J. Broughton	·	2.0 km	MPC · JPL
157143	2004 PX_{1}	—	August 6, 2004	Reedy Creek	J. Broughton	NYS	2.1 km	MPC · JPL
157144	2004 PR_{2}	—	August 6, 2004	Palomar	NEAT	MRX	1.7 km	MPC · JPL
157145	2004 PW_{2}	—	August 3, 2004	Siding Spring	SSS	·	1.6 km	MPC · JPL
157146	2004 PK_{7}	—	August 6, 2004	Palomar	NEAT	·	4.2 km	MPC · JPL
157147	2004 PQ_{7}	—	August 6, 2004	Palomar	NEAT	·	2.0 km	MPC · JPL
157148	2004 PK_{11}	—	August 7, 2004	Palomar	NEAT	·	3.3 km	MPC · JPL
157149	2004 PB_{12}	—	August 7, 2004	Palomar	NEAT	NYS	2.1 km	MPC · JPL
157150	2004 PO_{14}	—	August 7, 2004	Palomar	NEAT	NYS	2.0 km	MPC · JPL
157151	2004 PU_{14}	—	August 7, 2004	Palomar	NEAT	NYS	2.4 km	MPC · JPL
157152	2004 PH_{18}	—	August 8, 2004	Anderson Mesa	LONEOS	·	1.8 km	MPC · JPL
157153	2004 PF_{19}	—	August 8, 2004	Anderson Mesa	LONEOS	·	2.1 km	MPC · JPL
157154	2004 PM_{19}	—	August 8, 2004	Anderson Mesa	LONEOS	MAS	1.2 km	MPC · JPL
157155	2004 PR_{20}	—	August 6, 2004	Palomar	NEAT	·	2.8 km	MPC · JPL
157156	2004 PG_{22}	—	August 8, 2004	Socorro	LINEAR	NYS	1.8 km	MPC · JPL
157157	2004 PB_{28}	—	August 5, 2004	Palomar	NEAT	V	1.1 km	MPC · JPL
157158	2004 PO_{28}	—	August 6, 2004	Palomar	NEAT	·	1.4 km	MPC · JPL
157159	2004 PU_{30}	—	August 8, 2004	Socorro	LINEAR	·	2.5 km	MPC · JPL
157160	2004 PA_{32}	—	August 8, 2004	Socorro	LINEAR	·	1.8 km	MPC · JPL
157161	2004 PR_{32}	—	August 8, 2004	Socorro	LINEAR	MAS	1.1 km	MPC · JPL
157162	2004 PW_{34}	—	August 8, 2004	Anderson Mesa	LONEOS	AGN	1.7 km	MPC · JPL
157163	2004 PD_{35}	—	August 8, 2004	Anderson Mesa	LONEOS	·	1.6 km	MPC · JPL
157164	2004 PN_{36}	—	August 9, 2004	Socorro	LINEAR	V	1.1 km	MPC · JPL
157165	2004 PT_{36}	—	August 9, 2004	Socorro	LINEAR	SUL	3.4 km	MPC · JPL
157166	2004 PY_{37}	—	August 9, 2004	Socorro	LINEAR	MAS	1.3 km	MPC · JPL
157167	2004 PQ_{42}	—	August 9, 2004	Anderson Mesa	LONEOS	NYS	1.8 km	MPC · JPL
157168	2004 PY_{43}	—	August 6, 2004	Campo Imperatore	CINEOS	MAS	930 m	MPC · JPL
157169	2004 PM_{45}	—	August 7, 2004	Palomar	NEAT	·	2.0 km	MPC · JPL
157170	2004 PG_{49}	—	August 8, 2004	Palomar	NEAT	·	1.7 km	MPC · JPL
157171	2004 PX_{49}	—	August 8, 2004	Socorro	LINEAR	NYS	2.1 km	MPC · JPL
157172	2004 PF_{51}	—	August 8, 2004	Socorro	LINEAR	·	1.7 km	MPC · JPL
157173	2004 PC_{54}	—	August 8, 2004	Anderson Mesa	LONEOS	NYS	1.6 km	MPC · JPL
157174	2004 PJ_{58}	—	August 9, 2004	Socorro	LINEAR	NYS	1.9 km	MPC · JPL
157175	2004 PU_{58}	—	August 9, 2004	Socorro	LINEAR	NYS	1.8 km	MPC · JPL
157176	2004 PC_{60}	—	August 9, 2004	Socorro	LINEAR	·	3.1 km	MPC · JPL
157177	2004 PP_{61}	—	August 9, 2004	Socorro	LINEAR	·	1.5 km	MPC · JPL
157178	2004 PR_{61}	—	August 9, 2004	Socorro	LINEAR	(5)	2.1 km	MPC · JPL
157179	2004 PW_{66}	—	August 11, 2004	Consell	Observatorio Astronómico de Consell	·	2.1 km	MPC · JPL
157180	2004 PH_{71}	—	August 8, 2004	Socorro	LINEAR	·	1.2 km	MPC · JPL
157181	2004 PF_{83}	—	August 10, 2004	Socorro	LINEAR	NYS	2.1 km	MPC · JPL
157182	2004 PD_{84}	—	August 10, 2004	Socorro	LINEAR	·	5.9 km	MPC · JPL
157183	2004 PK_{85}	—	August 10, 2004	Socorro	LINEAR	·	3.2 km	MPC · JPL
157184	2004 PL_{85}	—	August 10, 2004	Socorro	LINEAR	·	2.9 km	MPC · JPL
157185	2004 PX_{89}	—	August 10, 2004	Socorro	LINEAR	·	1.2 km	MPC · JPL
157186	2004 PU_{96}	—	August 11, 2004	Campo Imperatore	CINEOS	MAS	950 m	MPC · JPL
157187	2004 PZ_{99}	—	August 11, 2004	Socorro	LINEAR	·	10 km	MPC · JPL
157188	2004 PU_{103}	—	August 12, 2004	Socorro	LINEAR	JUN	4.4 km	MPC · JPL
157189	2004 PX_{106}	—	August 15, 2004	Campo Imperatore	CINEOS	NYS	1.7 km	MPC · JPL
157190	2004 PK_{113}	—	August 8, 2004	Socorro	LINEAR	·	1.8 km	MPC · JPL
157191	2004 QL_{2}	—	August 20, 2004	Catalina	CSS	EUN	2.6 km	MPC · JPL
157192	2004 QB_{4}	—	August 19, 2004	Siding Spring	SSS	EMA	4.8 km	MPC · JPL
157193	2004 QU_{5}	—	August 17, 2004	Socorro	LINEAR	·	3.4 km	MPC · JPL
157194 Saddlemyer	2004 QR_{16}	Saddlemyer	August 21, 2004	Mauna Kea	D. D. Balam	·	2.1 km	MPC · JPL
157195	2004 QX_{19}	—	August 22, 2004	Goodricke-Pigott	Goodricke-Pigott	EOS	3.3 km	MPC · JPL
157196	2004 QU_{21}	—	August 25, 2004	Kitt Peak	Spacewatch	·	1.6 km	MPC · JPL
157197	2004 QN_{24}	—	August 20, 2004	Catalina	CSS	·	4.6 km	MPC · JPL
157198	2004 RU_{1}	—	September 4, 2004	Needville	J. Dellinger, Lowe, A.	EOS	2.6 km	MPC · JPL
157199	2004 RZ_{8}	—	September 6, 2004	Goodricke-Pigott	Goodricke-Pigott	KOR	2.1 km	MPC · JPL
157200	2004 RC_{9}	—	September 6, 2004	Goodricke-Pigott	Goodricke-Pigott	WIT	1.8 km	MPC · JPL

== 157201–157300 ==
back to top

Designation			Discovery			Properties		Ref
Permanent	Provisional	Named after	Date	Site	Discoverer(s)	Category	Diam.	Ref
157201	2004 RE_{13}	—	September 4, 2004	Palomar	NEAT	NYS	2.3 km	MPC · JPL
157202	2004 RG_{14}	—	September 6, 2004	Siding Spring	SSS	·	1.9 km	MPC · JPL
157203	2004 RW_{15}	—	September 7, 2004	Socorro	LINEAR	·	1.8 km	MPC · JPL
157204	2004 RQ_{16}	—	September 7, 2004	Socorro	LINEAR	NYS	2.6 km	MPC · JPL
157205	2004 RT_{18}	—	September 7, 2004	Kitt Peak	Spacewatch	·	3.3 km	MPC · JPL
157206	2004 RU_{18}	—	September 7, 2004	Kitt Peak	Spacewatch	·	2.2 km	MPC · JPL
157207	2004 RX_{18}	—	September 7, 2004	Kitt Peak	Spacewatch	·	2.3 km	MPC · JPL
157208	2004 RH_{22}	—	September 7, 2004	Kitt Peak	Spacewatch	·	1.5 km	MPC · JPL
157209	2004 RL_{22}	—	September 7, 2004	Kitt Peak	Spacewatch	·	3.4 km	MPC · JPL
157210	2004 RQ_{27}	—	September 6, 2004	Siding Spring	SSS	·	3.0 km	MPC · JPL
157211	2004 RJ_{28}	—	September 6, 2004	Siding Spring	SSS	URS	6.1 km	MPC · JPL
157212	2004 RQ_{28}	—	September 6, 2004	Siding Spring	SSS	·	2.9 km	MPC · JPL
157213	2004 RS_{28}	—	September 6, 2004	Siding Spring	SSS	NYS	1.6 km	MPC · JPL
157214	2004 RV_{28}	—	September 6, 2004	Siding Spring	SSS	·	3.4 km	MPC · JPL
157215	2004 RZ_{28}	—	September 6, 2004	Siding Spring	SSS	·	1.7 km	MPC · JPL
157216	2004 RB_{29}	—	September 7, 2004	Socorro	LINEAR	·	1.4 km	MPC · JPL
157217	2004 RT_{29}	—	September 7, 2004	Socorro	LINEAR	MAS	1.1 km	MPC · JPL
157218	2004 RB_{34}	—	September 7, 2004	Socorro	LINEAR	·	2.3 km	MPC · JPL
157219	2004 RY_{35}	—	September 7, 2004	Socorro	LINEAR	·	2.2 km	MPC · JPL
157220	2004 RV_{53}	—	September 8, 2004	Socorro	LINEAR	·	3.1 km	MPC · JPL
157221	2004 RM_{56}	—	September 8, 2004	Socorro	LINEAR	PHO	3.7 km	MPC · JPL
157222	2004 RD_{58}	—	September 8, 2004	Socorro	LINEAR	·	1.8 km	MPC · JPL
157223	2004 RW_{61}	—	September 8, 2004	Socorro	LINEAR	·	1.8 km	MPC · JPL
157224	2004 RO_{64}	—	September 8, 2004	Socorro	LINEAR	HOF	4.5 km	MPC · JPL
157225	2004 RJ_{69}	—	September 8, 2004	Socorro	LINEAR	KOR	2.5 km	MPC · JPL
157226	2004 RS_{69}	—	September 8, 2004	Socorro	LINEAR	NYS	1.8 km	MPC · JPL
157227	2004 RK_{70}	—	September 8, 2004	Socorro	LINEAR	(12739)	2.5 km	MPC · JPL
157228	2004 RY_{70}	—	September 8, 2004	Socorro	LINEAR	KOR	2.5 km	MPC · JPL
157229	2004 RB_{73}	—	September 8, 2004	Socorro	LINEAR	(3460)	3.0 km	MPC · JPL
157230	2004 RF_{75}	—	September 8, 2004	Socorro	LINEAR	·	2.2 km	MPC · JPL
157231	2004 RL_{75}	—	September 8, 2004	Socorro	LINEAR	·	4.1 km	MPC · JPL
157232	2004 RF_{76}	—	September 8, 2004	Socorro	LINEAR	·	3.1 km	MPC · JPL
157233	2004 RU_{77}	—	September 8, 2004	Socorro	LINEAR	AGN	2.5 km	MPC · JPL
157234	2004 RK_{81}	—	September 8, 2004	Socorro	LINEAR	·	2.0 km	MPC · JPL
157235	2004 RD_{86}	—	September 7, 2004	Socorro	LINEAR	·	2.8 km	MPC · JPL
157236	2004 RB_{89}	—	September 8, 2004	Socorro	LINEAR	·	1.3 km	MPC · JPL
157237	2004 RX_{91}	—	September 8, 2004	Socorro	LINEAR	EUN	2.5 km	MPC · JPL
157238	2004 RJ_{93}	—	September 8, 2004	Socorro	LINEAR	GEF	2.1 km	MPC · JPL
157239	2004 RP_{96}	—	September 8, 2004	Socorro	LINEAR	·	1.8 km	MPC · JPL
157240	2004 RE_{100}	—	September 8, 2004	Socorro	LINEAR	·	3.9 km	MPC · JPL
157241	2004 RU_{104}	—	September 8, 2004	Palomar	NEAT	ERI	4.2 km	MPC · JPL
157242	2004 RN_{105}	—	September 8, 2004	Palomar	NEAT	·	2.9 km	MPC · JPL
157243	2004 RQ_{107}	—	September 9, 2004	Socorro	LINEAR	·	2.1 km	MPC · JPL
157244	2004 RT_{108}	—	September 9, 2004	Kitt Peak	Spacewatch	PAD	3.8 km	MPC · JPL
157245	2004 RU_{110}	—	September 7, 2004	Goodricke-Pigott	R. A. Tucker	·	2.5 km	MPC · JPL
157246	2004 RB_{111}	—	September 9, 2004	Socorro	LINEAR	KOR	2.4 km	MPC · JPL
157247	2004 RS_{115}	—	September 7, 2004	Kitt Peak	Spacewatch	·	2.2 km	MPC · JPL
157248	2004 RF_{123}	—	September 7, 2004	Kitt Peak	Spacewatch	·	1.3 km	MPC · JPL
157249	2004 RV_{128}	—	September 7, 2004	Kitt Peak	Spacewatch	V	1.0 km	MPC · JPL
157250	2004 RK_{147}	—	September 9, 2004	Socorro	LINEAR	·	3.5 km	MPC · JPL
157251	2004 RL_{148}	—	September 9, 2004	Socorro	LINEAR	NYS	1.6 km	MPC · JPL
157252	2004 RG_{149}	—	September 9, 2004	Socorro	LINEAR	AGN	2.2 km	MPC · JPL
157253	2004 RD_{151}	—	September 9, 2004	Socorro	LINEAR	·	6.0 km	MPC · JPL
157254	2004 RV_{151}	—	September 9, 2004	Socorro	LINEAR	(5)	2.3 km	MPC · JPL
157255	2004 RF_{155}	—	September 10, 2004	Socorro	LINEAR	·	2.3 km	MPC · JPL
157256	2004 RQ_{159}	—	September 10, 2004	Socorro	LINEAR	·	3.3 km	MPC · JPL
157257	2004 RM_{164}	—	September 7, 2004	Socorro	LINEAR	·	3.8 km	MPC · JPL
157258 Leach	2004 RL_{165}	Leach	September 12, 2004	Jarnac	Jarnac	·	2.8 km	MPC · JPL
157259	2004 RZ_{171}	—	September 9, 2004	Socorro	LINEAR	NYS	2.2 km	MPC · JPL
157260	2004 RZ_{182}	—	September 10, 2004	Socorro	LINEAR	·	2.8 km	MPC · JPL
157261	2004 RK_{183}	—	September 10, 2004	Socorro	LINEAR	·	3.8 km	MPC · JPL
157262	2004 RA_{185}	—	September 10, 2004	Socorro	LINEAR	T_{j} (2.95)	7.8 km	MPC · JPL
157263	2004 RZ_{185}	—	September 10, 2004	Socorro	LINEAR	·	3.2 km	MPC · JPL
157264	2004 RH_{190}	—	September 10, 2004	Socorro	LINEAR	EUN	2.2 km	MPC · JPL
157265	2004 RW_{192}	—	September 10, 2004	Socorro	LINEAR	BRA	2.5 km	MPC · JPL
157266	2004 RD_{194}	—	September 10, 2004	Socorro	LINEAR	·	3.6 km	MPC · JPL
157267	2004 RJ_{198}	—	September 10, 2004	Socorro	LINEAR	·	2.1 km	MPC · JPL
157268	2004 RL_{200}	—	September 10, 2004	Socorro	LINEAR	·	3.9 km	MPC · JPL
157269	2004 RB_{209}	—	September 11, 2004	Socorro	LINEAR	·	4.5 km	MPC · JPL
157270	2004 RP_{217}	—	September 11, 2004	Socorro	LINEAR	·	3.7 km	MPC · JPL
157271 Gurtovenko	2004 RK_{222}	Gurtovenko	September 13, 2004	Andrushivka	Kovalchuk, G., Lokot, V.	·	2.0 km	MPC · JPL
157272	2004 RE_{224}	—	September 8, 2004	Socorro	LINEAR	·	2.5 km	MPC · JPL
157273	2004 RH_{226}	—	September 9, 2004	Socorro	LINEAR	·	4.4 km	MPC · JPL
157274	2004 RB_{227}	—	September 9, 2004	Kitt Peak	Spacewatch	HYG	4.6 km	MPC · JPL
157275	2004 RW_{230}	—	September 9, 2004	Kitt Peak	Spacewatch	KOR	2.2 km	MPC · JPL
157276	2004 RG_{231}	—	September 9, 2004	Kitt Peak	Spacewatch	·	3.6 km	MPC · JPL
157277	2004 RP_{231}	—	September 9, 2004	Kitt Peak	Spacewatch	·	2.6 km	MPC · JPL
157278	2004 RC_{233}	—	September 9, 2004	Kitt Peak	Spacewatch	·	1.3 km	MPC · JPL
157279	2004 RT_{233}	—	September 9, 2004	Kitt Peak	Spacewatch	·	2.6 km	MPC · JPL
157280	2004 RC_{234}	—	September 9, 2004	Kitt Peak	Spacewatch	·	3.4 km	MPC · JPL
157281	2004 RS_{254}	—	September 6, 2004	Palomar	NEAT	·	2.9 km	MPC · JPL
157282	2004 RH_{258}	—	September 10, 2004	Kitt Peak	Spacewatch	·	1.7 km	MPC · JPL
157283	2004 RL_{281}	—	September 15, 2004	Kitt Peak	Spacewatch	KOR	2.1 km	MPC · JPL
157284	2004 RZ_{286}	—	September 15, 2004	Socorro	LINEAR	·	2.5 km	MPC · JPL
157285	2004 RD_{287}	—	September 15, 2004	Kitt Peak	Spacewatch	·	4.6 km	MPC · JPL
157286	2004 RS_{287}	—	September 15, 2004	7300 Observatory	W. K. Y. Yeung	·	4.4 km	MPC · JPL
157287	2004 RS_{292}	—	September 10, 2004	Palomar	NEAT	·	1.4 km	MPC · JPL
157288	2004 RU_{292}	—	September 10, 2004	Siding Spring	SSS	·	2.6 km	MPC · JPL
157289	2004 RD_{306}	—	September 12, 2004	Socorro	LINEAR	·	1.8 km	MPC · JPL
157290	2004 RX_{306}	—	September 12, 2004	Socorro	LINEAR	·	3.0 km	MPC · JPL
157291	2004 RH_{309}	—	September 13, 2004	Kitt Peak	Spacewatch	·	3.2 km	MPC · JPL
157292	2004 RN_{312}	—	September 15, 2004	7300 Observatory	7300	·	4.8 km	MPC · JPL
157293	2004 RU_{321}	—	September 13, 2004	Socorro	LINEAR	·	2.9 km	MPC · JPL
157294	2004 RP_{323}	—	September 13, 2004	Socorro	LINEAR	·	4.6 km	MPC · JPL
157295	2004 RQ_{323}	—	September 13, 2004	Socorro	LINEAR	·	3.7 km	MPC · JPL
157296	2004 RG_{334}	—	September 15, 2004	Anderson Mesa	LONEOS	·	2.7 km	MPC · JPL
157297	2004 RZ_{334}	—	September 15, 2004	Anderson Mesa	LONEOS	·	1.4 km	MPC · JPL
157298	2004 RT_{337}	—	September 15, 2004	Kitt Peak	Spacewatch	·	3.7 km	MPC · JPL
157299	2004 SV_{14}	—	September 17, 2004	Anderson Mesa	LONEOS	·	2.4 km	MPC · JPL
157300	2004 SD_{15}	—	September 17, 2004	Anderson Mesa	LONEOS	·	1.9 km	MPC · JPL

== 157301–157400 ==
back to top

Designation			Discovery			Properties		Ref
Permanent	Provisional	Named after	Date	Site	Discoverer(s)	Category	Diam.	Ref
157301 Loreena	2004 SE_{20}	Loreena	September 16, 2004	Drebach	~Knöfel, A.	·	2.3 km	MPC · JPL
157302	2004 SZ_{21}	—	September 16, 2004	Kitt Peak	Spacewatch	·	2.2 km	MPC · JPL
157303	2004 SK_{22}	—	September 17, 2004	Socorro	LINEAR	·	2.8 km	MPC · JPL
157304	2004 SR_{24}	—	September 20, 2004	Goodricke-Pigott	R. A. Tucker	·	2.1 km	MPC · JPL
157305	2004 SA_{26}	—	September 17, 2004	Kitt Peak	Spacewatch	NYS	1.5 km	MPC · JPL
157306	2004 SZ_{27}	—	September 16, 2004	Kitt Peak	Spacewatch	KOR	1.7 km	MPC · JPL
157307	2004 SA_{29}	—	September 17, 2004	Socorro	LINEAR	(5)	1.7 km	MPC · JPL
157308	2004 SH_{29}	—	September 17, 2004	Socorro	LINEAR	·	2.3 km	MPC · JPL
157309	2004 ST_{29}	—	September 17, 2004	Socorro	LINEAR	·	2.2 km	MPC · JPL
157310	2004 SO_{30}	—	September 17, 2004	Socorro	LINEAR	(12739)	3.0 km	MPC · JPL
157311	2004 SC_{31}	—	September 17, 2004	Socorro	LINEAR	·	2.6 km	MPC · JPL
157312	2004 SU_{32}	—	September 17, 2004	Socorro	LINEAR	slow	3.1 km	MPC · JPL
157313	2004 SX_{34}	—	September 17, 2004	Socorro	LINEAR	(5)	1.9 km	MPC · JPL
157314	2004 SD_{37}	—	September 17, 2004	Kitt Peak	Spacewatch	EOS	2.6 km	MPC · JPL
157315	2004 SP_{38}	—	September 17, 2004	Socorro	LINEAR	THM	4.0 km	MPC · JPL
157316	2004 SG_{41}	—	September 17, 2004	Kitt Peak	Spacewatch	·	1.6 km	MPC · JPL
157317	2004 SK_{45}	—	September 18, 2004	Socorro	LINEAR	·	1.7 km	MPC · JPL
157318	2004 SA_{47}	—	September 18, 2004	Socorro	LINEAR	·	2.4 km	MPC · JPL
157319	2004 ST_{47}	—	September 18, 2004	Socorro	LINEAR	·	3.2 km	MPC · JPL
157320	2004 SY_{48}	—	September 21, 2004	Socorro	LINEAR	KOR	2.0 km	MPC · JPL
157321	2004 SN_{52}	—	September 18, 2004	Socorro	LINEAR	·	3.0 km	MPC · JPL
157322	2004 SJ_{54}	—	September 22, 2004	Socorro	LINEAR	·	5.8 km	MPC · JPL
157323	2004 SU_{57}	—	September 16, 2004	Anderson Mesa	LONEOS	EUN	2.3 km	MPC · JPL
157324	2004 TN_{6}	—	October 2, 2004	Palomar	NEAT	MAR	1.9 km	MPC · JPL
157325	2004 TF_{7}	—	October 5, 2004	Socorro	LINEAR	EOS	3.8 km	MPC · JPL
157326	2004 TM_{7}	—	October 5, 2004	Socorro	LINEAR	·	5.7 km	MPC · JPL
157327	2004 TK_{8}	—	October 4, 2004	Kitt Peak	Spacewatch	KOR	1.9 km	MPC · JPL
157328	2004 TV_{12}	—	October 5, 2004	Anderson Mesa	LONEOS	·	5.0 km	MPC · JPL
157329	2004 TM_{16}	—	October 13, 2004	Trois-Rivières	Allen, E. J.	·	5.9 km	MPC · JPL
157330	2004 TS_{16}	—	October 13, 2004	Sonoita	W. R. Cooney Jr., Gross, J.	AGN	1.3 km	MPC · JPL
157331	2004 TY_{19}	—	October 11, 2004	Kitt Peak	Spacewatch	GEF	2.4 km	MPC · JPL
157332 Lynette	2004 TL_{20}	Lynette	October 15, 2004	Needville	Wells, D.	·	2.2 km	MPC · JPL
157333	2004 TH_{21}	—	October 3, 2004	Palomar	NEAT	MAR	1.3 km	MPC · JPL
157334	2004 TO_{24}	—	October 4, 2004	Kitt Peak	Spacewatch	·	2.6 km	MPC · JPL
157335	2004 TL_{30}	—	October 4, 2004	Kitt Peak	Spacewatch	·	2.4 km	MPC · JPL
157336	2004 TN_{30}	—	October 4, 2004	Kitt Peak	Spacewatch	·	2.8 km	MPC · JPL
157337	2004 TE_{43}	—	October 4, 2004	Kitt Peak	Spacewatch	(5)	1.9 km	MPC · JPL
157338	2004 TZ_{43}	—	October 4, 2004	Kitt Peak	Spacewatch	·	3.7 km	MPC · JPL
157339	2004 TP_{45}	—	October 4, 2004	Kitt Peak	Spacewatch	·	2.3 km	MPC · JPL
157340	2004 TT_{45}	—	October 4, 2004	Kitt Peak	Spacewatch	·	4.9 km	MPC · JPL
157341	2004 TU_{45}	—	October 4, 2004	Kitt Peak	Spacewatch	·	2.5 km	MPC · JPL
157342	2004 TL_{55}	—	October 4, 2004	Kitt Peak	Spacewatch	KOR	2.1 km	MPC · JPL
157343	2004 TU_{61}	—	October 5, 2004	Anderson Mesa	LONEOS	NEM	3.4 km	MPC · JPL
157344	2004 TZ_{64}	—	October 5, 2004	Kitt Peak	Spacewatch	·	4.3 km	MPC · JPL
157345	2004 TS_{65}	—	October 5, 2004	Anderson Mesa	LONEOS	·	2.4 km	MPC · JPL
157346	2004 TB_{67}	—	October 5, 2004	Anderson Mesa	LONEOS	·	3.9 km	MPC · JPL
157347	2004 TQ_{67}	—	October 5, 2004	Anderson Mesa	LONEOS	EOS	3.4 km	MPC · JPL
157348	2004 TX_{67}	—	October 5, 2004	Anderson Mesa	LONEOS	·	5.9 km	MPC · JPL
157349	2004 TA_{68}	—	October 5, 2004	Anderson Mesa	LONEOS	·	2.6 km	MPC · JPL
157350	2004 TB_{69}	—	October 5, 2004	Anderson Mesa	LONEOS	EOS ·	3.7 km	MPC · JPL
157351	2004 TS_{69}	—	October 5, 2004	Anderson Mesa	LONEOS	·	2.5 km	MPC · JPL
157352	2004 TU_{75}	—	October 6, 2004	Palomar	NEAT	·	4.1 km	MPC · JPL
157353	2004 TW_{75}	—	October 6, 2004	Palomar	NEAT	·	3.3 km	MPC · JPL
157354	2004 TX_{81}	—	October 5, 2004	Kitt Peak	Spacewatch	·	4.3 km	MPC · JPL
157355	2004 TB_{91}	—	October 5, 2004	Kitt Peak	Spacewatch	·	2.1 km	MPC · JPL
157356	2004 TH_{94}	—	October 5, 2004	Kitt Peak	Spacewatch	·	2.6 km	MPC · JPL
157357	2004 TZ_{96}	—	October 5, 2004	Kitt Peak	Spacewatch	AGN	2.1 km	MPC · JPL
157358	2004 TZ_{106}	—	October 7, 2004	Socorro	LINEAR	·	2.4 km	MPC · JPL
157359	2004 TV_{107}	—	October 7, 2004	Socorro	LINEAR	·	3.1 km	MPC · JPL
157360	2004 TJ_{108}	—	October 7, 2004	Socorro	LINEAR	·	3.3 km	MPC · JPL
157361	2004 TV_{109}	—	October 7, 2004	Anderson Mesa	LONEOS	·	1.9 km	MPC · JPL
157362	2004 TQ_{113}	—	October 7, 2004	Palomar	NEAT	KOR	2.2 km	MPC · JPL
157363	2004 TX_{113}	—	October 7, 2004	Palomar	NEAT	·	4.4 km	MPC · JPL
157364	2004 TK_{114}	—	October 8, 2004	Kitt Peak	Spacewatch	·	3.8 km	MPC · JPL
157365	2004 TV_{118}	—	October 5, 2004	Palomar	NEAT	·	5.8 km	MPC · JPL
157366	2004 TL_{120}	—	October 6, 2004	Palomar	NEAT	ADE	5.4 km	MPC · JPL
157367	2004 TF_{125}	—	October 7, 2004	Socorro	LINEAR	KOR	2.1 km	MPC · JPL
157368	2004 TH_{127}	—	October 7, 2004	Socorro	LINEAR	HYG	4.3 km	MPC · JPL
157369	2004 TE_{128}	—	October 7, 2004	Socorro	LINEAR	·	3.4 km	MPC · JPL
157370	2004 TH_{128}	—	October 7, 2004	Socorro	LINEAR	AGN	1.6 km	MPC · JPL
157371	2004 TZ_{130}	—	October 7, 2004	Socorro	LINEAR	·	2.4 km	MPC · JPL
157372	2004 TW_{134}	—	October 8, 2004	Anderson Mesa	LONEOS	NYS	1.5 km	MPC · JPL
157373	2004 TC_{135}	—	October 8, 2004	Anderson Mesa	LONEOS	·	2.9 km	MPC · JPL
157374	2004 TS_{138}	—	October 9, 2004	Anderson Mesa	LONEOS	EOS	3.2 km	MPC · JPL
157375	2004 TK_{140}	—	October 4, 2004	Kitt Peak	Spacewatch	3:2 · SHU	9.2 km	MPC · JPL
157376	2004 TN_{155}	—	October 6, 2004	Kitt Peak	Spacewatch	·	2.2 km	MPC · JPL
157377	2004 TG_{158}	—	October 6, 2004	Kitt Peak	Spacewatch	·	5.5 km	MPC · JPL
157378	2004 TU_{163}	—	October 6, 2004	Kitt Peak	Spacewatch	AST	5.0 km	MPC · JPL
157379	2004 TV_{164}	—	October 6, 2004	Kitt Peak	Spacewatch	·	3.2 km	MPC · JPL
157380	2004 TF_{168}	—	October 7, 2004	Socorro	LINEAR	KOR	2.4 km	MPC · JPL
157381	2004 TN_{169}	—	October 7, 2004	Socorro	LINEAR	(5)	2.1 km	MPC · JPL
157382	2004 TU_{169}	—	October 7, 2004	Socorro	LINEAR	·	2.6 km	MPC · JPL
157383	2004 TV_{170}	—	October 7, 2004	Socorro	LINEAR	·	4.0 km	MPC · JPL
157384	2004 TS_{172}	—	October 8, 2004	Socorro	LINEAR	·	3.2 km	MPC · JPL
157385	2004 TX_{174}	—	October 9, 2004	Socorro	LINEAR	MAS	980 m	MPC · JPL
157386	2004 TQ_{180}	—	October 7, 2004	Kitt Peak	Spacewatch	·	3.0 km	MPC · JPL
157387	2004 TC_{184}	—	October 7, 2004	Kitt Peak	Spacewatch	·	4.1 km	MPC · JPL
157388	2004 TC_{185}	—	October 7, 2004	Kitt Peak	Spacewatch	·	1.9 km	MPC · JPL
157389	2004 TL_{202}	—	October 7, 2004	Kitt Peak	Spacewatch	MRX	1.8 km	MPC · JPL
157390	2004 TJ_{203}	—	October 7, 2004	Kitt Peak	Spacewatch	·	4.4 km	MPC · JPL
157391	2004 TM_{205}	—	October 7, 2004	Kitt Peak	Spacewatch	·	5.2 km	MPC · JPL
157392	2004 TR_{207}	—	October 7, 2004	Kitt Peak	Spacewatch	·	2.9 km	MPC · JPL
157393	2004 TM_{209}	—	October 8, 2004	Kitt Peak	Spacewatch	·	1.8 km	MPC · JPL
157394	2004 TT_{211}	—	October 8, 2004	Kitt Peak	Spacewatch	·	3.4 km	MPC · JPL
157395	2004 TX_{215}	—	October 10, 2004	Kitt Peak	Spacewatch	·	3.5 km	MPC · JPL
157396 Vansevičius	2004 TM_{216}	Vansevičius	October 13, 2004	Moletai	K. Černis, Zdanavicius, J.	EOS	3.3 km	MPC · JPL
157397	2004 TY_{220}	—	October 7, 2004	Socorro	LINEAR	KOR	2.0 km	MPC · JPL
157398	2004 TV_{221}	—	October 7, 2004	Socorro	LINEAR	·	6.0 km	MPC · JPL
157399	2004 TH_{234}	—	October 8, 2004	Kitt Peak	Spacewatch	·	3.6 km	MPC · JPL
157400	2004 TH_{238}	—	October 9, 2004	Kitt Peak	Spacewatch	·	3.6 km	MPC · JPL

== 157401–157500 ==
back to top

Designation			Discovery			Properties		Ref
Permanent	Provisional	Named after	Date	Site	Discoverer(s)	Category	Diam.	Ref
157401	2004 TY_{240}	—	October 10, 2004	Socorro	LINEAR	·	8.3 km	MPC · JPL
157402	2004 TH_{241}	—	October 10, 2004	Socorro	LINEAR	·	4.0 km	MPC · JPL
157403	2004 TS_{242}	—	October 6, 2004	Socorro	LINEAR	T_{j} (2.99) · EUP	6.6 km	MPC · JPL
157404	2004 TZ_{245}	—	October 7, 2004	Kitt Peak	Spacewatch	·	4.1 km	MPC · JPL
157405	2004 TH_{247}	—	October 7, 2004	Socorro	LINEAR	·	3.7 km	MPC · JPL
157406	2004 TK_{249}	—	October 7, 2004	Kitt Peak	Spacewatch	·	3.9 km	MPC · JPL
157407	2004 TM_{250}	—	October 7, 2004	Palomar	NEAT	·	2.9 km	MPC · JPL
157408	2004 TF_{258}	—	October 9, 2004	Kitt Peak	Spacewatch	·	1.3 km	MPC · JPL
157409	2004 TP_{262}	—	October 9, 2004	Socorro	LINEAR	·	4.8 km	MPC · JPL
157410	2004 TP_{270}	—	October 9, 2004	Kitt Peak	Spacewatch	·	5.2 km	MPC · JPL
157411	2004 TZ_{270}	—	October 9, 2004	Kitt Peak	Spacewatch	·	3.2 km	MPC · JPL
157412	2004 TX_{276}	—	October 9, 2004	Kitt Peak	Spacewatch	KOR	2.0 km	MPC · JPL
157413	2004 TP_{279}	—	October 10, 2004	Socorro	LINEAR	·	5.1 km	MPC · JPL
157414	2004 TU_{285}	—	October 8, 2004	Socorro	LINEAR	·	4.8 km	MPC · JPL
157415	2004 TD_{286}	—	October 8, 2004	Kitt Peak	Spacewatch	·	2.0 km	MPC · JPL
157416	2004 TL_{286}	—	October 8, 2004	Kitt Peak	Spacewatch	EOS	2.7 km	MPC · JPL
157417	2004 TY_{293}	—	October 10, 2004	Kitt Peak	Spacewatch	·	4.0 km	MPC · JPL
157418	2004 TO_{294}	—	October 10, 2004	Kitt Peak	Spacewatch	·	4.1 km	MPC · JPL
157419	2004 TJ_{296}	—	October 10, 2004	Kitt Peak	Spacewatch	VER	4.9 km	MPC · JPL
157420	2004 TC_{299}	—	October 13, 2004	Kitt Peak	Spacewatch	THM	4.2 km	MPC · JPL
157421 Carolpercy	2004 TX_{299}	Carolpercy	October 8, 2004	Jarnac	Glinos, T., D. H. Levy, Levy, W.	·	1.2 km	MPC · JPL
157422	2004 TP_{306}	—	October 10, 2004	Socorro	LINEAR	EOS	3.2 km	MPC · JPL
157423	2004 TZ_{309}	—	October 10, 2004	Kitt Peak	Spacewatch	KOR	1.8 km	MPC · JPL
157424	2004 TN_{328}	—	October 4, 2004	Palomar	NEAT	·	2.8 km	MPC · JPL
157425	2004 TS_{328}	—	October 4, 2004	Palomar	NEAT	·	1.7 km	MPC · JPL
157426	2004 TF_{333}	—	October 9, 2004	Kitt Peak	Spacewatch	fast	1.7 km	MPC · JPL
157427	2004 TN_{334}	—	October 10, 2004	Kitt Peak	Spacewatch	·	1.2 km	MPC · JPL
157428	2004 TS_{334}	—	October 10, 2004	Kitt Peak	Spacewatch	AST	2.5 km	MPC · JPL
157429	2004 TV_{340}	—	October 13, 2004	Kitt Peak	Spacewatch	·	3.7 km	MPC · JPL
157430	2004 TP_{341}	—	October 13, 2004	Kitt Peak	Spacewatch	THM	3.8 km	MPC · JPL
157431	2004 TA_{343}	—	October 13, 2004	Kitt Peak	Spacewatch	·	5.6 km	MPC · JPL
157432	2004 TM_{344}	—	October 15, 2004	Mount Lemmon	Mount Lemmon Survey	·	4.7 km	MPC · JPL
157433	2004 TT_{356}	—	October 14, 2004	Anderson Mesa	LONEOS	·	4.6 km	MPC · JPL
157434	2004 TR_{358}	—	October 5, 2004	Kitt Peak	Spacewatch	·	4.4 km	MPC · JPL
157435	2004 TH_{361}	—	October 13, 2004	Kitt Peak	Spacewatch	·	3.9 km	MPC · JPL
157436	2004 UT_{3}	—	October 18, 2004	Socorro	LINEAR	·	3.2 km	MPC · JPL
157437	2004 VU_{3}	—	November 3, 2004	Kitt Peak	Spacewatch	URS	5.7 km	MPC · JPL
157438	2004 VG_{5}	—	November 3, 2004	Anderson Mesa	LONEOS	·	5.5 km	MPC · JPL
157439	2004 VW_{6}	—	November 3, 2004	Kitt Peak	Spacewatch	·	3.1 km	MPC · JPL
157440	2004 VZ_{8}	—	November 3, 2004	Anderson Mesa	LONEOS	·	2.0 km	MPC · JPL
157441	2004 VO_{11}	—	November 3, 2004	Palomar	NEAT	AST	4.1 km	MPC · JPL
157442	2004 VZ_{13}	—	November 4, 2004	Kitt Peak	Spacewatch	·	4.4 km	MPC · JPL
157443	2004 VM_{17}	—	November 3, 2004	Kitt Peak	Spacewatch	·	3.0 km	MPC · JPL
157444	2004 VV_{17}	—	November 3, 2004	Palomar	NEAT	·	3.9 km	MPC · JPL
157445	2004 VG_{22}	—	November 4, 2004	Catalina	CSS	·	2.0 km	MPC · JPL
157446	2004 VK_{23}	—	November 5, 2004	Palomar	NEAT	·	5.2 km	MPC · JPL
157447	2004 VM_{23}	—	November 5, 2004	Palomar	NEAT	·	4.1 km	MPC · JPL
157448	2004 VV_{39}	—	November 4, 2004	Kitt Peak	Spacewatch	·	3.4 km	MPC · JPL
157449	2004 VH_{52}	—	November 4, 2004	Catalina	CSS	·	5.5 km	MPC · JPL
157450	2004 VF_{53}	—	November 5, 2004	Palomar	NEAT	·	3.6 km	MPC · JPL
157451	2004 VP_{53}	—	November 7, 2004	Socorro	LINEAR	·	4.7 km	MPC · JPL
157452	2004 VJ_{63}	—	November 10, 2004	Kitt Peak	Spacewatch	·	2.4 km	MPC · JPL
157453	2004 VG_{72}	—	November 4, 2004	Anderson Mesa	LONEOS	·	5.7 km	MPC · JPL
157454	2004 VU_{78}	—	November 3, 2004	Kitt Peak	Spacewatch	THM	3.2 km	MPC · JPL
157455	2004 WV	—	November 17, 2004	Siding Spring	SSS	·	4.9 km	MPC · JPL
157456 Pivatte	2004 WT_{2}	Pivatte	November 17, 2004	Nogales	M. Ory	KOR	1.9 km	MPC · JPL
157457	2004 WF_{11}	—	November 20, 2004	Kitt Peak	Spacewatch	KOR	2.4 km	MPC · JPL
157458	2004 XP_{2}	—	December 1, 2004	Palomar	NEAT	EOS	3.5 km	MPC · JPL
157459	2004 XX_{20}	—	December 8, 2004	Socorro	LINEAR	(8737)	5.3 km	MPC · JPL
157460	2004 XC_{28}	—	December 10, 2004	Socorro	LINEAR	·	8.4 km	MPC · JPL
157461	2004 XR_{32}	—	December 10, 2004	Socorro	LINEAR	·	7.6 km	MPC · JPL
157462	2004 XO_{68}	—	December 7, 2004	Socorro	LINEAR	·	5.1 km	MPC · JPL
157463	2004 XM_{77}	—	December 10, 2004	Socorro	LINEAR	VER	4.9 km	MPC · JPL
157464	2004 XQ_{78}	—	December 10, 2004	Socorro	LINEAR	·	3.3 km	MPC · JPL
157465	2004 XR_{87}	—	December 9, 2004	Catalina	CSS	·	3.1 km	MPC · JPL
157466	2004 XQ_{105}	—	December 11, 2004	Socorro	LINEAR	·	7.5 km	MPC · JPL
157467	2004 XR_{172}	—	December 10, 2004	Catalina	CSS	·	5.1 km	MPC · JPL
157468	2004 XS_{184}	—	December 10, 2004	Kitt Peak	Spacewatch	L5	10 km	MPC · JPL
157469	2005 AP_{31}	—	January 11, 2005	Socorro	LINEAR	L5	18 km	MPC · JPL
157470	2005 AG_{61}	—	January 15, 2005	Kitt Peak	Spacewatch	L5	12 km	MPC · JPL
157471	2005 AX_{71}	—	January 15, 2005	Kitt Peak	Spacewatch	L5	10 km	MPC · JPL
157472	2005 PM_{1}	—	August 1, 2005	Siding Spring	SSS	ADE	4.7 km	MPC · JPL
157473 Emuno	2005 QH	Emuno	August 23, 2005	La Cañada	Lacruz, J.	·	1.7 km	MPC · JPL
157474	2005 QX_{18}	—	August 25, 2005	Palomar	NEAT	·	1.5 km	MPC · JPL
157475	2005 QH_{24}	—	August 27, 2005	Kitt Peak	Spacewatch	·	2.1 km	MPC · JPL
157476	2005 QE_{37}	—	August 25, 2005	Palomar	NEAT	·	1.8 km	MPC · JPL
157477	2005 QE_{51}	—	August 26, 2005	Haleakala	NEAT	V	1.1 km	MPC · JPL
157478	2005 QO_{59}	—	August 25, 2005	Palomar	NEAT	DOR	4.1 km	MPC · JPL
157479	2005 QQ_{70}	—	August 29, 2005	Socorro	LINEAR	·	2.1 km	MPC · JPL
157480	2005 QD_{71}	—	August 29, 2005	Socorro	LINEAR	(1547)	2.7 km	MPC · JPL
157481	2005 QS_{77}	—	August 25, 2005	Palomar	NEAT	·	1.5 km	MPC · JPL
157482	2005 QS_{82}	—	August 29, 2005	Socorro	LINEAR	·	1.2 km	MPC · JPL
157483	2005 QB_{98}	—	August 27, 2005	Palomar	NEAT	·	1.4 km	MPC · JPL
157484	2005 QC_{119}	—	August 28, 2005	Kitt Peak	Spacewatch	·	1.1 km	MPC · JPL
157485	2005 QN_{136}	—	August 28, 2005	Kitt Peak	Spacewatch	·	1.3 km	MPC · JPL
157486	2005 QB_{161}	—	August 28, 2005	Kitt Peak	Spacewatch	·	970 m	MPC · JPL
157487	2005 QG_{175}	—	August 31, 2005	Anderson Mesa	LONEOS	EUN	1.5 km	MPC · JPL
157488	2005 QL_{175}	—	August 31, 2005	Kitt Peak	Spacewatch	·	1.2 km	MPC · JPL
157489	2005 QW_{175}	—	August 31, 2005	Palomar	NEAT	·	1.1 km	MPC · JPL
157490	2005 RR_{8}	—	September 8, 2005	Socorro	LINEAR	·	2.7 km	MPC · JPL
157491 Rüdigerkollar	2005 RD_{22}	Rüdigerkollar	September 8, 2005	Radebeul	M. Fiedler	·	2.6 km	MPC · JPL
157492	2005 RY_{24}	—	September 6, 2005	Catalina	CSS	·	1.4 km	MPC · JPL
157493	2005 RL_{26}	—	September 8, 2005	Socorro	LINEAR	·	1.2 km	MPC · JPL
157494 Durham	2005 RK_{28}	Durham	September 11, 2005	Jarnac	Jarnac	·	2.8 km	MPC · JPL
157495	2005 SE_{3}	—	September 23, 2005	Anderson Mesa	LONEOS	·	1.4 km	MPC · JPL
157496	2005 SH_{3}	—	September 23, 2005	Catalina	CSS	NYS	1.6 km	MPC · JPL
157497	2005 SU_{9}	—	September 25, 2005	Palomar	NEAT	JUN	1.4 km	MPC · JPL
157498	2005 SL_{13}	—	September 24, 2005	Kitt Peak	Spacewatch	MAS	1.0 km	MPC · JPL
157499	2005 SE_{20}	—	September 23, 2005	Kitt Peak	Spacewatch	·	1.5 km	MPC · JPL
157500	2005 ST_{20}	—	September 25, 2005	Palomar	NEAT	·	1.1 km	MPC · JPL

== 157501–157600 ==
back to top

Designation			Discovery			Properties		Ref
Permanent	Provisional	Named after	Date	Site	Discoverer(s)	Category	Diam.	Ref
157501	2005 SD_{24}	—	September 24, 2005	Anderson Mesa	LONEOS	·	1.1 km	MPC · JPL
157502	2005 ST_{34}	—	September 23, 2005	Kitt Peak	Spacewatch	·	1.9 km	MPC · JPL
157503	2005 SU_{36}	—	September 24, 2005	Kitt Peak	Spacewatch	·	830 m	MPC · JPL
157504	2005 SB_{41}	—	September 24, 2005	Kitt Peak	Spacewatch	NYS	1.4 km	MPC · JPL
157505	2005 ST_{50}	—	September 24, 2005	Kitt Peak	Spacewatch	V	1.0 km	MPC · JPL
157506	2005 SD_{53}	—	September 25, 2005	Catalina	CSS	NYS	1.4 km	MPC · JPL
157507	2005 SZ_{56}	—	September 26, 2005	Kitt Peak	Spacewatch	·	890 m	MPC · JPL
157508	2005 SK_{73}	—	September 23, 2005	Kitt Peak	Spacewatch	·	1.2 km	MPC · JPL
157509	2005 SM_{73}	—	September 23, 2005	Kitt Peak	Spacewatch	NYS	1.7 km	MPC · JPL
157510	2005 SQ_{84}	—	September 24, 2005	Kitt Peak	Spacewatch	·	3.1 km	MPC · JPL
157511	2005 SD_{85}	—	September 24, 2005	Kitt Peak	Spacewatch	·	830 m	MPC · JPL
157512	2005 SX_{93}	—	September 24, 2005	Kitt Peak	Spacewatch	EUN	1.7 km	MPC · JPL
157513	2005 SD_{105}	—	September 25, 2005	Palomar	NEAT	·	1.9 km	MPC · JPL
157514	2005 SM_{105}	—	September 25, 2005	Kitt Peak	Spacewatch	V	1.1 km	MPC · JPL
157515	2005 ST_{105}	—	September 25, 2005	Palomar	NEAT	·	6.3 km	MPC · JPL
157516	2005 SL_{122}	—	September 29, 2005	Kitt Peak	Spacewatch	·	1.4 km	MPC · JPL
157517	2005 SV_{141}	—	September 25, 2005	Kitt Peak	Spacewatch	NYS	1.1 km	MPC · JPL
157518	2005 SJ_{148}	—	September 25, 2005	Kitt Peak	Spacewatch	·	1.5 km	MPC · JPL
157519	2005 SF_{157}	—	September 26, 2005	Kitt Peak	Spacewatch	·	1.3 km	MPC · JPL
157520	2005 SF_{159}	—	September 26, 2005	Kitt Peak	Spacewatch	·	2.3 km	MPC · JPL
157521	2005 SK_{161}	—	September 27, 2005	Kitt Peak	Spacewatch	MAS	1.0 km	MPC · JPL
157522	2005 SV_{173}	—	September 29, 2005	Anderson Mesa	LONEOS	·	1.4 km	MPC · JPL
157523	2005 SC_{181}	—	September 29, 2005	Kitt Peak	Spacewatch	·	1.3 km	MPC · JPL
157524	2005 SF_{190}	—	September 29, 2005	Anderson Mesa	LONEOS	·	1.4 km	MPC · JPL
157525	2005 SM_{190}	—	September 29, 2005	Anderson Mesa	LONEOS	·	2.7 km	MPC · JPL
157526	2005 SH_{215}	—	September 30, 2005	Catalina	CSS	·	1.8 km	MPC · JPL
157527	2005 SU_{265}	—	September 28, 2005	Palomar	NEAT	MAS	770 m	MPC · JPL
157528	2005 SX_{270}	—	September 30, 2005	Anderson Mesa	LONEOS	H	830 m	MPC · JPL
157529	2005 TP_{9}	—	October 1, 2005	Mount Lemmon	Mount Lemmon Survey	(194)	2.9 km	MPC · JPL
157530	2005 TX_{17}	—	October 1, 2005	Socorro	LINEAR	NYS ·	1.6 km	MPC · JPL
157531	2005 TK_{24}	—	October 1, 2005	Mount Lemmon	Mount Lemmon Survey	·	2.4 km	MPC · JPL
157532	2005 TT_{40}	—	October 1, 2005	Kitt Peak	Spacewatch	·	2.9 km	MPC · JPL
157533 Stellamarie	2005 TL_{49}	Stellamarie	October 10, 2005	Altschwendt	W. Ries	·	1.9 km	MPC · JPL
157534 Šiauliai	2005 TZ_{49}	Šiauliai	October 8, 2005	Moletai	K. Černis, Zdanavicius, J.	·	1.3 km	MPC · JPL
157535	2005 TF_{54}	—	October 1, 2005	Socorro	LINEAR	EUN	2.0 km	MPC · JPL
157536	2005 TT_{106}	—	October 4, 2005	Mount Lemmon	Mount Lemmon Survey	(883)	1.3 km	MPC · JPL
157537	2005 TO_{130}	—	October 7, 2005	Kitt Peak	Spacewatch	·	1.5 km	MPC · JPL
157538	2005 TB_{133}	—	October 7, 2005	Kitt Peak	Spacewatch	·	4.8 km	MPC · JPL
157539	2005 TD_{177}	—	October 1, 2005	Kitt Peak	Spacewatch	·	2.1 km	MPC · JPL
157540	2005 UO_{3}	—	October 25, 2005	Junk Bond	D. Healy	·	1.3 km	MPC · JPL
157541 Wachter	2005 UN_{8}	Wachter	October 27, 2005	Ottmarsheim	C. Rinner	·	1.5 km	MPC · JPL
157542	2005 UF_{14}	—	October 22, 2005	Kitt Peak	Spacewatch	·	1.8 km	MPC · JPL
157543	2005 UJ_{16}	—	October 22, 2005	Kitt Peak	Spacewatch	·	2.4 km	MPC · JPL
157544	2005 UZ_{18}	—	October 22, 2005	Kitt Peak	Spacewatch	·	2.4 km	MPC · JPL
157545	2005 UC_{19}	—	October 22, 2005	Kitt Peak	Spacewatch	NYS	1.5 km	MPC · JPL
157546	2005 UT_{25}	—	October 23, 2005	Kitt Peak	Spacewatch	·	2.0 km	MPC · JPL
157547	2005 UV_{26}	—	October 23, 2005	Catalina	CSS	·	1.1 km	MPC · JPL
157548	2005 UE_{42}	—	October 21, 2005	Palomar	NEAT	·	1.3 km	MPC · JPL
157549	2005 UH_{53}	—	October 23, 2005	Catalina	CSS	V	1.2 km	MPC · JPL
157550	2005 UM_{59}	—	October 25, 2005	Kitt Peak	Spacewatch	·	970 m	MPC · JPL
157551	2005 UZ_{66}	—	October 22, 2005	Kitt Peak	Spacewatch	·	1.6 km	MPC · JPL
157552	2005 UU_{69}	—	October 23, 2005	Catalina	CSS	EOS	2.9 km	MPC · JPL
157553	2005 UG_{73}	—	October 23, 2005	Palomar	NEAT	·	1.6 km	MPC · JPL
157554	2005 UL_{79}	—	October 25, 2005	Catalina	CSS	·	1.1 km	MPC · JPL
157555	2005 UN_{81}	—	October 20, 2005	Palomar	NEAT	·	1.6 km	MPC · JPL
157556	2005 UH_{87}	—	October 22, 2005	Kitt Peak	Spacewatch	·	1.7 km	MPC · JPL
157557	2005 UK_{104}	—	October 22, 2005	Kitt Peak	Spacewatch	·	2.4 km	MPC · JPL
157558	2005 UY_{105}	—	October 22, 2005	Kitt Peak	Spacewatch	·	1.3 km	MPC · JPL
157559	2005 UT_{110}	—	October 22, 2005	Kitt Peak	Spacewatch	·	2.5 km	MPC · JPL
157560	2005 UY_{113}	—	October 22, 2005	Kitt Peak	Spacewatch	·	2.0 km	MPC · JPL
157561	2005 UK_{118}	—	October 24, 2005	Kitt Peak	Spacewatch	·	980 m	MPC · JPL
157562	2005 UU_{120}	—	October 24, 2005	Anderson Mesa	LONEOS	·	2.8 km	MPC · JPL
157563	2005 UF_{132}	—	October 24, 2005	Palomar	NEAT	(18466)	3.8 km	MPC · JPL
157564	2005 UQ_{132}	—	October 24, 2005	Palomar	NEAT	·	1.4 km	MPC · JPL
157565	2005 UA_{139}	—	October 25, 2005	Kitt Peak	Spacewatch	·	4.4 km	MPC · JPL
157566	2005 UL_{143}	—	October 25, 2005	Catalina	CSS	MAR	2.7 km	MPC · JPL
157567	2005 UM_{143}	—	October 25, 2005	Catalina	CSS	EUN	2.1 km	MPC · JPL
157568	2005 UF_{154}	—	October 26, 2005	Kitt Peak	Spacewatch	·	1.0 km	MPC · JPL
157569	2005 UC_{155}	—	October 26, 2005	Kitt Peak	Spacewatch	·	2.3 km	MPC · JPL
157570	2005 UP_{155}	—	October 26, 2005	Anderson Mesa	LONEOS	·	1.5 km	MPC · JPL
157571	2005 UX_{167}	—	October 24, 2005	Kitt Peak	Spacewatch	·	1.9 km	MPC · JPL
157572	2005 UV_{191}	—	October 27, 2005	Mount Lemmon	Mount Lemmon Survey	·	1.6 km	MPC · JPL
157573	2005 UL_{197}	—	October 24, 2005	Kitt Peak	Spacewatch	MIS	2.4 km	MPC · JPL
157574	2005 UH_{201}	—	October 25, 2005	Kitt Peak	Spacewatch	·	1.5 km	MPC · JPL
157575	2005 UM_{202}	—	October 25, 2005	Kitt Peak	Spacewatch	·	4.2 km	MPC · JPL
157576	2005 US_{230}	—	October 25, 2005	Catalina	CSS	·	1.5 km	MPC · JPL
157577	2005 UD_{233}	—	October 25, 2005	Kitt Peak	Spacewatch	·	1.7 km	MPC · JPL
157578	2005 UL_{254}	—	October 22, 2005	Kitt Peak	Spacewatch	NYS	2.0 km	MPC · JPL
157579	2005 UC_{275}	—	October 24, 2005	Palomar	NEAT	·	2.4 km	MPC · JPL
157580	2005 UG_{296}	—	October 26, 2005	Kitt Peak	Spacewatch	·	1.6 km	MPC · JPL
157581	2005 UB_{331}	—	October 28, 2005	Kitt Peak	Spacewatch	NYS	1.6 km	MPC · JPL
157582	2005 UE_{373}	—	October 27, 2005	Kitt Peak	Spacewatch	GEF	1.7 km	MPC · JPL
157583	2005 UQ_{381}	—	October 30, 2005	Palomar	NEAT	V	1.0 km	MPC · JPL
157584	2005 UC_{382}	—	October 26, 2005	Socorro	LINEAR	·	2.4 km	MPC · JPL
157585	2005 UZ_{396}	—	October 27, 2005	Catalina	CSS	·	3.8 km	MPC · JPL
157586	2005 UN_{432}	—	October 28, 2005	Kitt Peak	Spacewatch	·	840 m	MPC · JPL
157587	2005 UA_{441}	—	October 29, 2005	Catalina	CSS	PHO	1.8 km	MPC · JPL
157588	2005 UP_{442}	—	October 29, 2005	Palomar	NEAT	·	3.0 km	MPC · JPL
157589	2005 UE_{444}	—	October 30, 2005	Socorro	LINEAR	EUN	2.8 km	MPC · JPL
157590	2005 UO_{445}	—	October 31, 2005	Mount Lemmon	Mount Lemmon Survey	EUN	2.5 km	MPC · JPL
157591	2005 UF_{449}	—	October 30, 2005	Socorro	LINEAR	·	1.4 km	MPC · JPL
157592	2005 UK_{456}	—	October 30, 2005	Socorro	LINEAR	ADE	3.0 km	MPC · JPL
157593	2005 UC_{511}	—	October 26, 2005	Kitt Peak	Spacewatch	·	1.5 km	MPC · JPL
157594	2005 VC_{3}	—	November 4, 2005	Goodricke-Pigott	R. A. Tucker	·	2.8 km	MPC · JPL
157595	2005 VV_{19}	—	November 1, 2005	Kitt Peak	Spacewatch	MAR	1.6 km	MPC · JPL
157596	2005 VR_{26}	—	November 3, 2005	Socorro	LINEAR	·	1.8 km	MPC · JPL
157597	2005 VX_{52}	—	November 3, 2005	Mount Lemmon	Mount Lemmon Survey	·	2.0 km	MPC · JPL
157598	2005 VV_{67}	—	November 1, 2005	Mount Lemmon	Mount Lemmon Survey	·	2.9 km	MPC · JPL
157599 Verdery	2005 VK_{93}	Verdery	November 6, 2005	Mount Lemmon	Mount Lemmon Survey	·	2.5 km	MPC · JPL
157600	2005 VH_{96}	—	November 7, 2005	Socorro	LINEAR	·	1.3 km	MPC · JPL

== 157601–157700 ==
back to top

Designation			Discovery			Properties		Ref
Permanent	Provisional	Named after	Date	Site	Discoverer(s)	Category	Diam.	Ref
157601	2005 WG_{3}	—	November 20, 2005	Palomar	NEAT	·	2.5 km	MPC · JPL
157602	2005 WC_{6}	—	November 21, 2005	Anderson Mesa	LONEOS	MAR	1.8 km	MPC · JPL
157603	2005 WL_{13}	—	November 22, 2005	Kitt Peak	Spacewatch	·	1.3 km	MPC · JPL
157604	2005 WT_{21}	—	November 21, 2005	Kitt Peak	Spacewatch	·	5.0 km	MPC · JPL
157605	2005 WK_{22}	—	November 21, 2005	Kitt Peak	Spacewatch	AEO	1.6 km	MPC · JPL
157606	2005 WU_{26}	—	November 21, 2005	Kitt Peak	Spacewatch	AGN	1.9 km	MPC · JPL
157607	2005 WA_{28}	—	November 21, 2005	Kitt Peak	Spacewatch	·	2.6 km	MPC · JPL
157608	2005 WF_{34}	—	November 21, 2005	Kitt Peak	Spacewatch	·	5.7 km	MPC · JPL
157609	2005 WQ_{43}	—	November 21, 2005	Kitt Peak	Spacewatch	·	2.7 km	MPC · JPL
157610	2005 WW_{46}	—	November 25, 2005	Kitt Peak	Spacewatch	(7744)	1.8 km	MPC · JPL
157611	2005 WF_{51}	—	November 25, 2005	Kitt Peak	Spacewatch	·	5.0 km	MPC · JPL
157612	2005 WU_{65}	—	November 21, 2005	Catalina	CSS	·	1.9 km	MPC · JPL
157613	2005 WG_{66}	—	November 22, 2005	Kitt Peak	Spacewatch	·	1.1 km	MPC · JPL
157614	2005 WJ_{73}	—	November 25, 2005	Kitt Peak	Spacewatch	·	2.5 km	MPC · JPL
157615	2005 WP_{73}	—	November 25, 2005	Catalina	CSS	·	2.3 km	MPC · JPL
157616	2005 WF_{74}	—	November 26, 2005	Catalina	CSS	·	5.4 km	MPC · JPL
157617	2005 WT_{79}	—	November 25, 2005	Kitt Peak	Spacewatch	KOR	1.9 km	MPC · JPL
157618	2005 WX_{80}	—	November 26, 2005	Mount Lemmon	Mount Lemmon Survey	·	1.8 km	MPC · JPL
157619	2005 WK_{89}	—	November 25, 2005	Mount Lemmon	Mount Lemmon Survey	·	1.0 km	MPC · JPL
157620	2005 WR_{89}	—	November 26, 2005	Kitt Peak	Spacewatch	·	2.4 km	MPC · JPL
157621	2005 WQ_{100}	—	November 29, 2005	Socorro	LINEAR	·	2.2 km	MPC · JPL
157622	2005 WB_{101}	—	November 29, 2005	Socorro	LINEAR	·	1.7 km	MPC · JPL
157623	2005 WG_{105}	—	November 29, 2005	Catalina	CSS	·	3.5 km	MPC · JPL
157624	2005 WB_{106}	—	November 29, 2005	Catalina	CSS	·	970 m	MPC · JPL
157625	2005 WQ_{121}	—	November 30, 2005	Mount Lemmon	Mount Lemmon Survey	·	1.8 km	MPC · JPL
157626	2005 WP_{143}	—	November 30, 2005	Kitt Peak	Spacewatch	·	1.7 km	MPC · JPL
157627	2005 WD_{149}	—	November 28, 2005	Kitt Peak	Spacewatch	·	4.0 km	MPC · JPL
157628	2005 WA_{152}	—	November 28, 2005	Catalina	CSS	·	3.7 km	MPC · JPL
157629	2005 WL_{153}	—	November 29, 2005	Kitt Peak	Spacewatch	NYS	1.6 km	MPC · JPL
157630	2005 WB_{158}	—	November 26, 2005	Mount Lemmon	Mount Lemmon Survey	KOR	2.5 km	MPC · JPL
157631	2005 WA_{159}	—	November 28, 2005	Palomar	NEAT	·	3.8 km	MPC · JPL
157632	2005 WO_{162}	—	November 28, 2005	Mount Lemmon	Mount Lemmon Survey	·	2.0 km	MPC · JPL
157633	2005 WX_{178}	—	November 26, 2005	Anderson Mesa	LONEOS	·	2.2 km	MPC · JPL
157634	2005 WL_{196}	—	November 30, 2005	Mount Lemmon	Mount Lemmon Survey	·	3.1 km	MPC · JPL
157635	2005 WF_{198}	—	November 22, 2005	Kitt Peak	Spacewatch	·	2.2 km	MPC · JPL
157636	2005 WT_{202}	—	November 30, 2005	Socorro	LINEAR	·	2.9 km	MPC · JPL
157637	2005 XD_{41}	—	December 6, 2005	Socorro	LINEAR	·	4.1 km	MPC · JPL
157638	2005 XZ_{53}	—	December 4, 2005	Socorro	LINEAR	·	2.9 km	MPC · JPL
157639	2005 XY_{78}	—	December 4, 2005	Socorro	LINEAR	·	2.9 km	MPC · JPL
157640 Baumeler	2005 XS_{80}	Baumeler	December 1, 2006	Marly	P. Kocher	·	5.8 km	MPC · JPL
157641	2005 XX_{81}	—	December 8, 2005	Kitt Peak	Spacewatch	·	3.4 km	MPC · JPL
157642	2005 XU_{84}	—	December 10, 2005	Socorro	LINEAR	·	2.5 km	MPC · JPL
157643	2005 XU_{85}	—	December 2, 2005	Kitt Peak	Spacewatch	·	3.9 km	MPC · JPL
157644	2005 XK_{87}	—	December 7, 2005	Socorro	LINEAR	·	1.1 km	MPC · JPL
157645	2005 YA_{1}	—	December 21, 2005	Socorro	LINEAR	HNS	2.5 km	MPC · JPL
157646	2005 YO_{5}	—	December 21, 2005	Kitt Peak	Spacewatch	·	2.3 km	MPC · JPL
157647	2005 YX_{7}	—	December 22, 2005	Kitt Peak	Spacewatch	·	3.5 km	MPC · JPL
157648	2005 YC_{12}	—	December 21, 2005	Kitt Peak	Spacewatch	·	1.9 km	MPC · JPL
157649	2005 YK_{16}	—	December 22, 2005	Kitt Peak	Spacewatch	·	2.5 km	MPC · JPL
157650	2005 YB_{22}	—	December 24, 2005	Kitt Peak	Spacewatch	·	1.6 km	MPC · JPL
157651	2005 YV_{26}	—	December 21, 2005	Catalina	CSS	·	3.9 km	MPC · JPL
157652	2005 YM_{27}	—	December 22, 2005	Kitt Peak	Spacewatch	·	4.4 km	MPC · JPL
157653	2005 YU_{30}	—	December 22, 2005	Kitt Peak	Spacewatch	·	4.4 km	MPC · JPL
157654	2005 YT_{32}	—	December 22, 2005	Kitt Peak	Spacewatch	·	4.5 km	MPC · JPL
157655	2005 YW_{32}	—	December 22, 2005	Kitt Peak	Spacewatch	·	1.4 km	MPC · JPL
157656	2005 YF_{33}	—	December 24, 2005	Kitt Peak	Spacewatch	(5)	1.6 km	MPC · JPL
157657	2005 YL_{35}	—	December 25, 2005	Kitt Peak	Spacewatch	·	2.1 km	MPC · JPL
157658	2005 YB_{38}	—	December 21, 2005	Catalina	CSS	CYB	7.3 km	MPC · JPL
157659	2005 YB_{42}	—	December 22, 2005	Kitt Peak	Spacewatch	THM	4.6 km	MPC · JPL
157660	2005 YD_{45}	—	December 25, 2005	Kitt Peak	Spacewatch	·	3.0 km	MPC · JPL
157661	2005 YV_{50}	—	December 25, 2005	Kitt Peak	Spacewatch	·	3.0 km	MPC · JPL
157662	2005 YY_{50}	—	December 25, 2005	Mount Lemmon	Mount Lemmon Survey	THM	5.2 km	MPC · JPL
157663	2005 YB_{53}	—	December 22, 2005	Kitt Peak	Spacewatch	·	3.0 km	MPC · JPL
157664	2005 YY_{53}	—	December 24, 2005	Kitt Peak	Spacewatch	MAS	1.1 km	MPC · JPL
157665	2005 YM_{58}	—	December 24, 2005	Kitt Peak	Spacewatch	·	4.5 km	MPC · JPL
157666	2005 YW_{59}	—	December 22, 2005	Catalina	CSS	PHO	2.3 km	MPC · JPL
157667	2005 YZ_{61}	—	December 24, 2005	Kitt Peak	Spacewatch	·	3.5 km	MPC · JPL
157668	2005 YY_{72}	—	December 24, 2005	Kitt Peak	Spacewatch	·	4.7 km	MPC · JPL
157669	2005 YM_{77}	—	December 24, 2005	Kitt Peak	Spacewatch	·	2.3 km	MPC · JPL
157670	2005 YP_{92}	—	December 27, 2005	Mount Lemmon	Mount Lemmon Survey	·	4.6 km	MPC · JPL
157671	2005 YY_{92}	—	December 27, 2005	Mount Lemmon	Mount Lemmon Survey	·	2.3 km	MPC · JPL
157672	2005 YQ_{98}	—	December 26, 2005	Kitt Peak	Spacewatch	KOR	2.5 km	MPC · JPL
157673	2005 YR_{98}	—	December 26, 2005	Kitt Peak	Spacewatch	·	1.1 km	MPC · JPL
157674	2005 YC_{122}	—	December 28, 2005	Mount Lemmon	Mount Lemmon Survey	·	1.9 km	MPC · JPL
157675	2005 YH_{124}	—	December 26, 2005	Kitt Peak	Spacewatch	·	2.0 km	MPC · JPL
157676	2005 YJ_{128}	—	December 28, 2005	Mount Lemmon	Mount Lemmon Survey	·	5.9 km	MPC · JPL
157677	2005 YG_{131}	—	December 25, 2005	Mount Lemmon	Mount Lemmon Survey	·	2.6 km	MPC · JPL
157678	2005 YD_{133}	—	December 26, 2005	Kitt Peak	Spacewatch	·	4.0 km	MPC · JPL
157679	2005 YY_{136}	—	December 26, 2005	Mount Lemmon	Mount Lemmon Survey	·	3.3 km	MPC · JPL
157680	2005 YP_{137}	—	December 26, 2005	Kitt Peak	Spacewatch	AGN	2.1 km	MPC · JPL
157681	2005 YX_{171}	—	December 22, 2005	Socorro	LINEAR	·	1.8 km	MPC · JPL
157682	2005 YH_{172}	—	December 22, 2005	Catalina	CSS	EUN	1.9 km	MPC · JPL
157683	2005 YX_{178}	—	December 25, 2005	Mount Lemmon	Mount Lemmon Survey	THM	3.3 km	MPC · JPL
157684	2005 YD_{181}	—	December 22, 2005	Catalina	CSS	EUN	2.1 km	MPC · JPL
157685	2005 YB_{191}	—	December 30, 2005	Kitt Peak	Spacewatch	KOR	2.5 km	MPC · JPL
157686	2005 YM_{205}	—	December 26, 2005	Mount Lemmon	Mount Lemmon Survey	MAS	1.1 km	MPC · JPL
157687	2005 YD_{209}	—	December 22, 2005	Catalina	CSS	·	5.8 km	MPC · JPL
157688	2005 YX_{210}	—	December 24, 2005	Catalina	CSS	·	3.6 km	MPC · JPL
157689	2005 YM_{256}	—	December 30, 2005	Kitt Peak	Spacewatch	·	3.0 km	MPC · JPL
157690	2005 YR_{258}	—	December 24, 2005	Kitt Peak	Spacewatch	·	2.7 km	MPC · JPL
157691	2005 YG_{263}	—	December 25, 2005	Anderson Mesa	LONEOS	(13314)	3.2 km	MPC · JPL
157692	2005 YJ_{278}	—	December 25, 2005	Mount Lemmon	Mount Lemmon Survey	·	1.7 km	MPC · JPL
157693 Amandamarty	2006 AB	Amandamarty	January 2, 2006	RAS	Lowe, A.	·	3.4 km	MPC · JPL
157694	2006 AY_{2}	—	January 5, 2006	Rehoboth	Calvin College	·	4.8 km	MPC · JPL
157695	2006 AY_{5}	—	January 2, 2006	Socorro	LINEAR	EOS	3.4 km	MPC · JPL
157696	2006 AV_{6}	—	January 5, 2006	Catalina	CSS	·	5.5 km	MPC · JPL
157697	2006 AA_{7}	—	January 5, 2006	Catalina	CSS	CYB	7.1 km	MPC · JPL
157698	2006 AG_{14}	—	January 5, 2006	Mount Lemmon	Mount Lemmon Survey	THM	5.2 km	MPC · JPL
157699	2006 AJ_{17}	—	January 5, 2006	Kitt Peak	Spacewatch	·	2.7 km	MPC · JPL
157700	2006 AF_{18}	—	January 5, 2006	Anderson Mesa	LONEOS	EOS	3.6 km	MPC · JPL

== 157701–157800 ==
back to top

Designation			Discovery			Properties		Ref
Permanent	Provisional	Named after	Date	Site	Discoverer(s)	Category	Diam.	Ref
157701	2006 AD_{21}	—	January 5, 2006	Catalina	CSS	CYB	8.4 km	MPC · JPL
157702	2006 AZ_{21}	—	January 5, 2006	Catalina	CSS	·	5.9 km	MPC · JPL
157703	2006 AW_{27}	—	January 5, 2006	Catalina	CSS	·	2.9 km	MPC · JPL
157704	2006 AL_{29}	—	January 2, 2006	Catalina	CSS	·	4.1 km	MPC · JPL
157705	2006 AS_{35}	—	January 4, 2006	Mount Lemmon	Mount Lemmon Survey	·	3.3 km	MPC · JPL
157706	2006 AD_{51}	—	January 5, 2006	Kitt Peak	Spacewatch	·	6.0 km	MPC · JPL
157707	2006 AM_{51}	—	January 5, 2006	Kitt Peak	Spacewatch	THM	3.7 km	MPC · JPL
157708	2006 AO_{56}	—	January 7, 2006	Mount Lemmon	Mount Lemmon Survey	·	1.7 km	MPC · JPL
157709	2006 AA_{57}	—	January 7, 2006	Mount Lemmon	Mount Lemmon Survey	·	2.0 km	MPC · JPL
157710	2006 AR_{68}	—	January 5, 2006	Mount Lemmon	Mount Lemmon Survey	3:2	5.3 km	MPC · JPL
157711	2006 AU_{68}	—	January 5, 2006	Mount Lemmon	Mount Lemmon Survey	·	3.1 km	MPC · JPL
157712	2006 AX_{70}	—	January 6, 2006	Kitt Peak	Spacewatch	PHO	1.6 km	MPC · JPL
157713	2006 AO_{71}	—	January 6, 2006	Mount Lemmon	Mount Lemmon Survey	·	4.1 km	MPC · JPL
157714	2006 AO_{74}	—	January 6, 2006	Anderson Mesa	LONEOS	·	5.3 km	MPC · JPL
157715	2006 AW_{79}	—	January 6, 2006	Anderson Mesa	LONEOS	·	3.1 km	MPC · JPL
157716	2006 AK_{81}	—	January 5, 2006	Socorro	LINEAR	·	6.0 km	MPC · JPL
157717	2006 AV_{83}	—	January 5, 2006	Socorro	LINEAR	·	3.3 km	MPC · JPL
157718	2006 AF_{97}	—	January 5, 2006	Socorro	LINEAR	·	5.9 km	MPC · JPL
157719	2006 BY_{16}	—	January 22, 2006	Anderson Mesa	LONEOS	EOS	3.5 km	MPC · JPL
157720	2006 BD_{20}	—	January 22, 2006	Anderson Mesa	LONEOS	EOS	4.0 km	MPC · JPL
157721 Kölcsey	2006 BS_{26}	Kölcsey	January 24, 2006	Piszkéstető	K. Sárneczky	KOR	2.2 km	MPC · JPL
157722	2006 BR_{30}	—	January 20, 2006	Kitt Peak	Spacewatch	·	3.1 km	MPC · JPL
157723	2006 BA_{31}	—	January 20, 2006	Kitt Peak	Spacewatch	·	5.5 km	MPC · JPL
157724	2006 BK_{48}	—	January 25, 2006	Kitt Peak	Spacewatch	THM	3.1 km	MPC · JPL
157725	2006 BL_{50}	—	January 25, 2006	Kitt Peak	Spacewatch	KOR	1.5 km	MPC · JPL
157726	2006 BH_{51}	—	January 25, 2006	Kitt Peak	Spacewatch	·	3.4 km	MPC · JPL
157727	2006 BZ_{63}	—	January 22, 2006	Mount Lemmon	Mount Lemmon Survey	·	1.6 km	MPC · JPL
157728	2006 BX_{77}	—	January 23, 2006	Mount Lemmon	Mount Lemmon Survey	THM	5.0 km	MPC · JPL
157729	2006 BV_{85}	—	January 25, 2006	Catalina	CSS	EOS	3.3 km	MPC · JPL
157730	2006 BS_{88}	—	January 25, 2006	Kitt Peak	Spacewatch	L5	8.4 km	MPC · JPL
157731	2006 BW_{105}	—	January 25, 2006	Kitt Peak	Spacewatch	KOR	1.9 km	MPC · JPL
157732	2006 BB_{138}	—	January 28, 2006	Mount Lemmon	Mount Lemmon Survey	·	6.0 km	MPC · JPL
157733	2006 BJ_{148}	—	January 19, 2006	Catalina	CSS	EOS	3.0 km	MPC · JPL
157734	2006 BQ_{149}	—	January 24, 2006	Anderson Mesa	LONEOS	·	3.9 km	MPC · JPL
157735	2006 BP_{151}	—	January 25, 2006	Kitt Peak	Spacewatch	·	5.6 km	MPC · JPL
157736	2006 BB_{155}	—	January 25, 2006	Kitt Peak	Spacewatch	·	5.0 km	MPC · JPL
157737	2006 BX_{161}	—	January 26, 2006	Anderson Mesa	LONEOS	·	6.1 km	MPC · JPL
157738	2006 BJ_{183}	—	January 27, 2006	Socorro	LINEAR	THM	3.4 km	MPC · JPL
157739	2006 BG_{189}	—	January 28, 2006	Kitt Peak	Spacewatch	·	5.0 km	MPC · JPL
157740	2006 BP_{199}	—	January 30, 2006	Kitt Peak	Spacewatch	L5	11 km	MPC · JPL
157741	2006 BE_{202}	—	January 31, 2006	Kitt Peak	Spacewatch	L5	15 km	MPC · JPL
157742	2006 BX_{214}	—	January 24, 2006	Socorro	LINEAR	HYG	5.3 km	MPC · JPL
157743	2006 BW_{219}	—	January 30, 2006	Kitt Peak	Spacewatch	·	2.6 km	MPC · JPL
157744	2006 BX_{237}	—	January 31, 2006	Kitt Peak	Spacewatch	HYG	4.5 km	MPC · JPL
157745	2006 BF_{249}	—	January 31, 2006	Kitt Peak	Spacewatch	·	3.3 km	MPC · JPL
157746	2006 BX_{270}	—	January 26, 2006	Catalina	CSS	·	4.2 km	MPC · JPL
157747 Mandryka	2006 CS_{9}	Mandryka	February 2, 2006	Tenagra II	J.-C. Merlin	TIR	4.8 km	MPC · JPL
157748	2006 CP_{18}	—	February 1, 2006	Mount Lemmon	Mount Lemmon Survey	·	3.7 km	MPC · JPL
157749	2006 CC_{31}	—	February 2, 2006	Kitt Peak	Spacewatch	·	5.1 km	MPC · JPL
157750	2006 CF_{44}	—	February 3, 2006	Kitt Peak	Spacewatch	·	3.1 km	MPC · JPL
157751	2006 CE_{51}	—	February 4, 2006	Kitt Peak	Spacewatch	THM	3.5 km	MPC · JPL
157752	2006 CS_{53}	—	February 4, 2006	Catalina	CSS	·	1.7 km	MPC · JPL
157753	2006 DG_{3}	—	February 20, 2006	Kitt Peak	Spacewatch	(5)	2.5 km	MPC · JPL
157754	2006 DP_{51}	—	February 24, 2006	Kitt Peak	Spacewatch	·	3.5 km	MPC · JPL
157755	2006 DC_{100}	—	February 25, 2006	Mount Lemmon	Mount Lemmon Survey	THM	3.2 km	MPC · JPL
157756	2006 EE_{25}	—	March 3, 2006	Kitt Peak	Spacewatch	·	2.8 km	MPC · JPL
157757	2006 EF_{47}	—	March 4, 2006	Kitt Peak	Spacewatch	·	3.6 km	MPC · JPL
157758	2007 AU_{25}	—	January 15, 2007	Anderson Mesa	LONEOS	·	2.0 km	MPC · JPL
157759	2007 DO_{20}	—	February 17, 2007	Kitt Peak	Spacewatch	KOR	1.5 km	MPC · JPL
157760	2007 DD_{35}	—	February 17, 2007	Kitt Peak	Spacewatch	THM	3.1 km	MPC · JPL
157761	2007 DA_{37}	—	February 17, 2007	Kitt Peak	Spacewatch	·	2.5 km	MPC · JPL
157762	2007 DD_{37}	—	February 17, 2007	Kitt Peak	Spacewatch	·	770 m	MPC · JPL
157763	2007 DU_{37}	—	February 17, 2007	Kitt Peak	Spacewatch	HOF	3.3 km	MPC · JPL
157764	2007 DV_{47}	—	February 21, 2007	Mount Lemmon	Mount Lemmon Survey	·	2.3 km	MPC · JPL
157765	2007 DM_{58}	—	February 21, 2007	Kitt Peak	Spacewatch	·	2.5 km	MPC · JPL
157766	2007 DF_{97}	—	February 23, 2007	Catalina	CSS	·	3.1 km	MPC · JPL
157767	2007 DG_{99}	—	February 25, 2007	Mount Lemmon	Mount Lemmon Survey	V	950 m	MPC · JPL
157768	2007 DQ_{101}	—	February 23, 2007	Mount Lemmon	Mount Lemmon Survey	·	1.3 km	MPC · JPL
157769	2007 EB_{43}	—	March 9, 2007	Kitt Peak	Spacewatch	·	6.9 km	MPC · JPL
157770	2007 EO_{57}	—	March 9, 2007	Kitt Peak	Spacewatch	NYS	1.2 km	MPC · JPL
157771	2007 EV_{127}	—	March 9, 2007	Mount Lemmon	Mount Lemmon Survey	KOR	1.3 km	MPC · JPL
157772	2007 EK_{130}	—	March 9, 2007	Mount Lemmon	Mount Lemmon Survey	·	830 m	MPC · JPL
157773	2007 EW_{135}	—	March 10, 2007	Mount Lemmon	Mount Lemmon Survey	·	1.5 km	MPC · JPL
157774	2007 FF	—	March 16, 2007	Mount Lemmon	Mount Lemmon Survey	AGN	1.8 km	MPC · JPL
157775	2007 FZ_{1}	—	March 16, 2007	Catalina	CSS	·	5.0 km	MPC · JPL
157776	2770 P-L	—	September 24, 1960	Palomar	C. J. van Houten, I. van Houten-Groeneveld, T. Gehrels	·	1.3 km	MPC · JPL
157777	6239 P-L	—	September 24, 1960	Palomar	C. J. van Houten, I. van Houten-Groeneveld, T. Gehrels	·	3.8 km	MPC · JPL
157778	6812 P-L	—	September 24, 1960	Palomar	C. J. van Houten, I. van Houten-Groeneveld, T. Gehrels	·	2.3 km	MPC · JPL
157779	7582 P-L	—	October 17, 1960	Palomar	C. J. van Houten, I. van Houten-Groeneveld, T. Gehrels	EUN	2.2 km	MPC · JPL
157780	7620 P-L	—	October 17, 1960	Palomar	C. J. van Houten, I. van Houten-Groeneveld, T. Gehrels	·	2.0 km	MPC · JPL
157781	3077 T-2	—	September 30, 1973	Palomar	C. J. van Houten, I. van Houten-Groeneveld, T. Gehrels	·	3.6 km	MPC · JPL
157782	3296 T-2	—	September 30, 1973	Palomar	C. J. van Houten, I. van Houten-Groeneveld, T. Gehrels	EUN	2.0 km	MPC · JPL
157783	2124 T-3	—	October 16, 1977	Palomar	C. J. van Houten, I. van Houten-Groeneveld, T. Gehrels	·	3.7 km	MPC · JPL
157784	3458 T-3	—	October 16, 1977	Palomar	C. J. van Houten, I. van Houten-Groeneveld, T. Gehrels	PAD	2.7 km	MPC · JPL
157785	4233 T-3	—	October 16, 1977	Palomar	C. J. van Houten, I. van Houten-Groeneveld, T. Gehrels	·	5.5 km	MPC · JPL
157786	4345 T-3	—	October 16, 1977	Palomar	C. J. van Houten, I. van Houten-Groeneveld, T. Gehrels	·	1.2 km	MPC · JPL
157787	4443 T-3	—	October 16, 1977	Palomar	C. J. van Houten, I. van Houten-Groeneveld, T. Gehrels	·	2.8 km	MPC · JPL
157788	5020 T-3	—	October 16, 1977	Palomar	C. J. van Houten, I. van Houten-Groeneveld, T. Gehrels	·	4.2 km	MPC · JPL
157789	1991 RK_{28}	—	September 8, 1991	Kitt Peak	Spacewatch	·	1.7 km	MPC · JPL
157790	1991 VP_{8}	—	November 4, 1991	Kitt Peak	Spacewatch	·	780 m	MPC · JPL
157791	1992 SK_{3}	—	September 24, 1992	Kitt Peak	Spacewatch	·	3.9 km	MPC · JPL
157792	1993 FT_{10}	—	March 19, 1993	La Silla	UESAC	·	3.2 km	MPC · JPL
157793	1994 EZ_{5}	—	March 9, 1994	Caussols	E. W. Elst	·	3.4 km	MPC · JPL
157794	1994 PP_{14}	—	August 10, 1994	La Silla	E. W. Elst	DOR	4.3 km	MPC · JPL
157795	1995 CE_{3}	—	February 1, 1995	Kitt Peak	Spacewatch	·	3.7 km	MPC · JPL
157796	1995 FW_{4}	—	March 23, 1995	Kitt Peak	Spacewatch	THM	3.4 km	MPC · JPL
157797	1995 ON_{12}	—	July 30, 1995	Kitt Peak	Spacewatch	(5)	1.8 km	MPC · JPL
157798	1995 OZ_{12}	—	July 22, 1995	Kitt Peak	Spacewatch	·	3.5 km	MPC · JPL
157799	1995 SE_{13}	—	September 18, 1995	Kitt Peak	Spacewatch	·	3.9 km	MPC · JPL
157800	1995 SS_{18}	—	September 18, 1995	Kitt Peak	Spacewatch	·	2.3 km	MPC · JPL

== 157801–157900 ==
back to top

Designation			Discovery			Properties		Ref
Permanent	Provisional	Named after	Date	Site	Discoverer(s)	Category	Diam.	Ref
157801	1995 ST_{30}	—	September 20, 1995	Kitt Peak	Spacewatch	·	2.1 km	MPC · JPL
157802	1995 SV_{40}	—	September 25, 1995	Kitt Peak	Spacewatch	·	2.3 km	MPC · JPL
157803	1995 SZ_{56}	—	September 17, 1995	Kitt Peak	Spacewatch	·	2.0 km	MPC · JPL
157804	1995 SF_{87}	—	September 25, 1995	Kitt Peak	Spacewatch	·	2.3 km	MPC · JPL
157805	1995 TA_{5}	—	October 15, 1995	Kitt Peak	Spacewatch	·	2.4 km	MPC · JPL
157806	1995 UY_{13}	—	October 17, 1995	Kitt Peak	Spacewatch	·	2.0 km	MPC · JPL
157807	1995 UY_{14}	—	October 17, 1995	Kitt Peak	Spacewatch	·	3.8 km	MPC · JPL
157808	1995 UP_{43}	—	October 25, 1995	Kitt Peak	Spacewatch	·	3.2 km	MPC · JPL
157809	1995 UK_{50}	—	October 17, 1995	Kitt Peak	Spacewatch	·	2.7 km	MPC · JPL
157810	1995 UD_{56}	—	October 23, 1995	Kitt Peak	Spacewatch	·	2.0 km	MPC · JPL
157811	1995 UU_{56}	—	October 25, 1995	Kitt Peak	Spacewatch	CLO	3.8 km	MPC · JPL
157812	1995 US_{60}	—	October 24, 1995	Kitt Peak	Spacewatch	·	1.0 km	MPC · JPL
157813	1995 WN_{1}	—	November 16, 1995	Church Stretton	S. P. Laurie	·	1.4 km	MPC · JPL
157814	1995 WU_{28}	—	November 19, 1995	Kitt Peak	Spacewatch	·	3.8 km	MPC · JPL
157815	1996 FD_{7}	—	March 18, 1996	Kitt Peak	Spacewatch	MAS	780 m	MPC · JPL
157816	1996 GM_{7}	—	April 12, 1996	Kitt Peak	Spacewatch	·	4.2 km	MPC · JPL
157817	1996 GR_{8}	—	April 13, 1996	Kitt Peak	Spacewatch	·	1.7 km	MPC · JPL
157818	1996 GU_{9}	—	April 13, 1996	Kitt Peak	Spacewatch	·	3.4 km	MPC · JPL
157819	1996 JV_{6}	—	May 11, 1996	Kitt Peak	Spacewatch	·	3.1 km	MPC · JPL
157820	1996 TE_{21}	—	October 5, 1996	Kitt Peak	Spacewatch	·	2.0 km	MPC · JPL
157821	1996 TA_{24}	—	October 6, 1996	Kitt Peak	Spacewatch	·	1.4 km	MPC · JPL
157822	1996 TL_{28}	—	October 7, 1996	Kitt Peak	Spacewatch	·	1.3 km	MPC · JPL
157823	1996 XJ_{18}	—	December 7, 1996	Kitt Peak	Spacewatch	·	2.8 km	MPC · JPL
157824	1997 CP_{2}	—	February 2, 1997	Kitt Peak	Spacewatch	(17392)	2.8 km	MPC · JPL
157825 Zejda	1997 RE_{8}	Zejda	September 12, 1997	Ondřejov	M. Wolf, L. Kotková	·	6.7 km	MPC · JPL
157826	1997 SB_{23}	—	September 29, 1997	Kitt Peak	Spacewatch	·	2.8 km	MPC · JPL
157827	1997 TV_{18}	—	October 7, 1997	Xinglong	SCAP	·	1.5 km	MPC · JPL
157828	1997 WJ_{15}	—	November 23, 1997	Kitt Peak	Spacewatch	·	1.8 km	MPC · JPL
157829	1997 WC_{36}	—	November 29, 1997	Socorro	LINEAR	·	3.6 km	MPC · JPL
157830	1997 YE	—	December 18, 1997	Oizumi	T. Kobayashi	·	1.7 km	MPC · JPL
157831	1998 BR_{10}	—	January 25, 1998	Oizumi	T. Kobayashi	·	1.6 km	MPC · JPL
157832	1998 BO_{28}	—	January 24, 1998	Kitt Peak	Spacewatch	T_{j} (2.99) · HIL · 3:2	8.4 km	MPC · JPL
157833	1998 FK_{8}	—	March 20, 1998	Kitt Peak	Spacewatch	·	2.1 km	MPC · JPL
157834	1998 FV_{39}	—	March 20, 1998	Socorro	LINEAR	·	2.1 km	MPC · JPL
157835	1998 FS_{71}	—	March 20, 1998	Socorro	LINEAR	slow	3.7 km	MPC · JPL
157836	1998 FG_{102}	—	March 31, 1998	Socorro	LINEAR	·	5.8 km	MPC · JPL
157837	1998 FC_{125}	—	March 24, 1998	Socorro	LINEAR	EUN	2.0 km	MPC · JPL
157838	1998 FG_{139}	—	March 28, 1998	Socorro	LINEAR	·	2.7 km	MPC · JPL
157839	1998 GN_{8}	—	April 2, 1998	Socorro	LINEAR	·	3.1 km	MPC · JPL
157840	1998 HS_{9}	—	April 18, 1998	Kitt Peak	Spacewatch	·	3.6 km	MPC · JPL
157841	1998 HY_{53}	—	April 21, 1998	Socorro	LINEAR	·	2.9 km	MPC · JPL
157842	1998 MP_{1}	—	June 16, 1998	Kitt Peak	Spacewatch	·	2.8 km	MPC · JPL
157843	1998 QS_{29}	—	August 23, 1998	Xinglong	SCAP	·	2.2 km	MPC · JPL
157844	1998 QN_{84}	—	August 24, 1998	Socorro	LINEAR	·	6.3 km	MPC · JPL
157845	1998 RT_{17}	—	September 14, 1998	Socorro	LINEAR	·	3.0 km	MPC · JPL
157846	1998 RT_{22}	—	September 14, 1998	Socorro	LINEAR	·	930 m	MPC · JPL
157847	1998 RM_{46}	—	September 14, 1998	Socorro	LINEAR	·	1.0 km	MPC · JPL
157848	1998 RA_{67}	—	September 14, 1998	Socorro	LINEAR	·	5.4 km	MPC · JPL
157849	1998 SH_{96}	—	September 26, 1998	Socorro	LINEAR	TEL	3.8 km	MPC · JPL
157850	1998 SH_{101}	—	September 26, 1998	Socorro	LINEAR	·	3.5 km	MPC · JPL
157851	1998 SX_{151}	—	September 26, 1998	Socorro	LINEAR	·	3.2 km	MPC · JPL
157852	1998 TH_{6}	—	October 13, 1998	Kleť	Kleť	·	7.3 km	MPC · JPL
157853	1998 TL_{13}	—	October 13, 1998	Kitt Peak	Spacewatch	·	3.0 km	MPC · JPL
157854	1998 TN_{15}	—	October 14, 1998	Caussols	ODAS	·	4.4 km	MPC · JPL
157855	1998 TU_{22}	—	October 13, 1998	Kitt Peak	Spacewatch	THM	4.2 km	MPC · JPL
157856	1998 TK_{23}	—	October 14, 1998	Kitt Peak	Spacewatch	·	1.0 km	MPC · JPL
157857	1998 UR_{1}	—	October 17, 1998	Kitt Peak	Spacewatch	·	1.0 km	MPC · JPL
157858	1998 UO_{37}	—	October 28, 1998	Socorro	LINEAR	·	4.6 km	MPC · JPL
157859	1998 UM_{49}	—	October 27, 1998	Caussols	ODAS	·	7.7 km	MPC · JPL
157860	1998 VV_{25}	—	November 10, 1998	Socorro	LINEAR	·	4.4 km	MPC · JPL
157861	1998 VK_{48}	—	November 15, 1998	Kitt Peak	Spacewatch	3:2	8.1 km	MPC · JPL
157862	1998 WW_{11}	—	November 21, 1998	Socorro	LINEAR	·	6.9 km	MPC · JPL
157863	1998 WG_{26}	—	November 16, 1998	Kitt Peak	Spacewatch	·	1.2 km	MPC · JPL
157864	1998 WL_{39}	—	November 21, 1998	Kitt Peak	Spacewatch	·	1.2 km	MPC · JPL
157865	1998 WT_{39}	—	November 22, 1998	Kitt Peak	Spacewatch	EOS	3.6 km	MPC · JPL
157866	1998 YY_{4}	—	December 17, 1998	Caussols	ODAS	HYG	4.9 km	MPC · JPL
157867	1999 CK_{23}	—	February 10, 1999	Socorro	LINEAR	·	2.3 km	MPC · JPL
157868	1999 CO_{89}	—	February 10, 1999	Socorro	LINEAR	·	2.2 km	MPC · JPL
157869	1999 EQ_{8}	—	March 14, 1999	Kitt Peak	Spacewatch	MAS	960 m	MPC · JPL
157870	1999 EB_{11}	—	March 14, 1999	Kitt Peak	Spacewatch	·	2.0 km	MPC · JPL
157871	1999 ES_{11}	—	March 12, 1999	Socorro	LINEAR	BAR	4.2 km	MPC · JPL
157872	1999 GJ_{6}	—	April 14, 1999	Ondřejov	L. Kotková	EUN	1.9 km	MPC · JPL
157873	1999 JW_{7}	—	May 14, 1999	Goodricke-Pigott	R. A. Tucker	H	990 m	MPC · JPL
157874	1999 JM_{15}	—	May 15, 1999	Catalina	CSS	·	2.2 km	MPC · JPL
157875	1999 JF_{49}	—	May 10, 1999	Socorro	LINEAR	·	2.1 km	MPC · JPL
157876	1999 JN_{73}	—	May 12, 1999	Socorro	LINEAR	EUN	2.5 km	MPC · JPL
157877	1999 JY_{112}	—	May 13, 1999	Socorro	LINEAR	·	1.8 km	MPC · JPL
157878	1999 KJ_{2}	—	May 16, 1999	Kitt Peak	Spacewatch	·	1.2 km	MPC · JPL
157879	1999 NR_{53}	—	July 12, 1999	Socorro	LINEAR	MAR	2.3 km	MPC · JPL
157880	1999 NO_{60}	—	July 13, 1999	Socorro	LINEAR	·	5.3 km	MPC · JPL
157881	1999 RZ	—	September 4, 1999	Catalina	CSS	·	3.4 km	MPC · JPL
157882	1999 RV_{1}	—	September 5, 1999	Višnjan Observatory	K. Korlević	·	3.2 km	MPC · JPL
157883	1999 RF_{38}	—	September 13, 1999	Višnjan Observatory	K. Korlević	·	6.0 km	MPC · JPL
157884	1999 RV_{44}	—	September 14, 1999	Črni Vrh	Mikuž, H.	·	4.1 km	MPC · JPL
157885	1999 RD_{78}	—	September 7, 1999	Socorro	LINEAR	·	5.6 km	MPC · JPL
157886	1999 RG_{85}	—	September 7, 1999	Socorro	LINEAR	·	3.5 km	MPC · JPL
157887	1999 RS_{178}	—	September 9, 1999	Socorro	LINEAR	·	5.7 km	MPC · JPL
157888	1999 RE_{188}	—	September 9, 1999	Socorro	LINEAR	·	3.1 km	MPC · JPL
157889	1999 RO_{195}	—	September 8, 1999	Socorro	LINEAR	·	5.5 km	MPC · JPL
157890	1999 RV_{200}	—	September 8, 1999	Socorro	LINEAR	·	3.5 km	MPC · JPL
157891	1999 RA_{228}	—	September 8, 1999	Catalina	CSS	·	3.1 km	MPC · JPL
157892	1999 RG_{248}	—	September 7, 1999	Kitt Peak	Spacewatch	·	2.7 km	MPC · JPL
157893	1999 SU_{22}	—	September 30, 1999	Catalina	CSS	AEO	1.7 km	MPC · JPL
157894 Yasminwalter	1999 TK_{16}	Yasminwalter	October 14, 1999	Heppenheim	Starkenburg	·	2.0 km	MPC · JPL
157895	1999 TH_{23}	—	October 3, 1999	Kitt Peak	Spacewatch	NEM	4.5 km	MPC · JPL
157896	1999 TA_{43}	—	October 3, 1999	Kitt Peak	Spacewatch	KOR	1.8 km	MPC · JPL
157897	1999 TV_{76}	—	October 10, 1999	Kitt Peak	Spacewatch	THM	2.5 km	MPC · JPL
157898	1999 TZ_{96}	—	October 2, 1999	Socorro	LINEAR	·	5.9 km	MPC · JPL
157899	1999 TU_{106}	—	October 4, 1999	Socorro	LINEAR	·	4.0 km	MPC · JPL
157900	1999 TW_{108}	—	October 4, 1999	Socorro	LINEAR	DOR · slow	4.8 km	MPC · JPL

== 157901–158000 ==
back to top

Designation			Discovery			Properties		Ref
Permanent	Provisional	Named after	Date	Site	Discoverer(s)	Category	Diam.	Ref
157901	1999 TC_{116}	—	October 4, 1999	Socorro	LINEAR	·	4.0 km	MPC · JPL
157902	1999 TL_{117}	—	October 4, 1999	Socorro	LINEAR	·	5.6 km	MPC · JPL
157903	1999 TQ_{136}	—	October 6, 1999	Socorro	LINEAR	·	2.8 km	MPC · JPL
157904	1999 TM_{137}	—	October 6, 1999	Socorro	LINEAR	·	2.8 km	MPC · JPL
157905	1999 TN_{140}	—	October 6, 1999	Socorro	LINEAR	·	2.7 km	MPC · JPL
157906	1999 TZ_{147}	—	October 7, 1999	Socorro	LINEAR	·	3.4 km	MPC · JPL
157907	1999 TY_{154}	—	October 7, 1999	Socorro	LINEAR	·	3.2 km	MPC · JPL
157908	1999 TO_{156}	—	October 8, 1999	Socorro	LINEAR	PAD	3.4 km	MPC · JPL
157909	1999 TA_{183}	—	October 11, 1999	Socorro	LINEAR	KOR	2.3 km	MPC · JPL
157910	1999 TU_{204}	—	October 13, 1999	Socorro	LINEAR	·	3.6 km	MPC · JPL
157911	1999 TU_{236}	—	October 3, 1999	Catalina	CSS	·	4.3 km	MPC · JPL
157912	1999 TG_{255}	—	October 9, 1999	Kitt Peak	Spacewatch	·	2.3 km	MPC · JPL
157913	1999 TY_{267}	—	October 3, 1999	Socorro	LINEAR	·	4.0 km	MPC · JPL
157914	1999 TR_{291}	—	October 10, 1999	Socorro	LINEAR	·	5.8 km	MPC · JPL
157915	1999 TF_{306}	—	October 6, 1999	Socorro	LINEAR	·	2.6 km	MPC · JPL
157916	1999 TE_{311}	—	October 6, 1999	Kitt Peak	Spacewatch	KOR	2.3 km	MPC · JPL
157917	1999 UF_{8}	—	October 29, 1999	Catalina	CSS	·	3.6 km	MPC · JPL
157918	1999 UZ_{21}	—	October 31, 1999	Kitt Peak	Spacewatch	·	2.2 km	MPC · JPL
157919	1999 UZ_{38}	—	October 29, 1999	Anderson Mesa	LONEOS	·	5.1 km	MPC · JPL
157920	1999 VJ_{32}	—	November 3, 1999	Socorro	LINEAR	·	3.5 km	MPC · JPL
157921	1999 VV_{35}	—	November 3, 1999	Socorro	LINEAR	DOR	4.8 km	MPC · JPL
157922	1999 VS_{54}	—	November 4, 1999	Socorro	LINEAR	·	3.4 km	MPC · JPL
157923	1999 VX_{78}	—	November 4, 1999	Socorro	LINEAR	·	1 km	MPC · JPL
157924	1999 VO_{84}	—	November 6, 1999	Kitt Peak	Spacewatch	·	3.4 km	MPC · JPL
157925	1999 VO_{88}	—	November 4, 1999	Socorro	LINEAR	·	3.4 km	MPC · JPL
157926	1999 VB_{100}	—	November 9, 1999	Socorro	LINEAR	KOR	2.1 km	MPC · JPL
157927	1999 VA_{111}	—	November 9, 1999	Socorro	LINEAR	GEF	2.0 km	MPC · JPL
157928	1999 VR_{123}	—	November 5, 1999	Kitt Peak	Spacewatch	EOS	3.0 km	MPC · JPL
157929	1999 VF_{139}	—	November 9, 1999	Kitt Peak	Spacewatch	·	5.5 km	MPC · JPL
157930	1999 VX_{141}	—	November 10, 1999	Kitt Peak	Spacewatch	KOR	1.8 km	MPC · JPL
157931	1999 VC_{149}	—	November 14, 1999	Socorro	LINEAR	·	3.1 km	MPC · JPL
157932	1999 VO_{154}	—	November 12, 1999	Kitt Peak	Spacewatch	KOR	1.9 km	MPC · JPL
157933	1999 VS_{189}	—	November 15, 1999	Socorro	LINEAR	·	3.8 km	MPC · JPL
157934	1999 VM_{197}	—	November 3, 1999	Catalina	CSS	·	3.7 km	MPC · JPL
157935	1999 VA_{209}	—	November 12, 1999	Socorro	LINEAR	·	2.4 km	MPC · JPL
157936	1999 WO_{15}	—	November 29, 1999	Kitt Peak	Spacewatch	·	1.9 km	MPC · JPL
157937	1999 WT_{25}	—	November 29, 1999	Kitt Peak	Spacewatch	·	2.6 km	MPC · JPL
157938	1999 XB_{57}	—	December 7, 1999	Socorro	LINEAR	·	3.9 km	MPC · JPL
157939	1999 XJ_{153}	—	December 7, 1999	Socorro	LINEAR	EOS	4.6 km	MPC · JPL
157940	1999 XU_{240}	—	December 7, 1999	Socorro	LINEAR	·	4.7 km	MPC · JPL
157941	1999 XT_{250}	—	December 5, 1999	Kitt Peak	Spacewatch	KOR	2.0 km	MPC · JPL
157942	1999 YN_{10}	—	December 27, 1999	Kitt Peak	Spacewatch	KOR	1.8 km	MPC · JPL
157943	2000 AH_{27}	—	January 3, 2000	Socorro	LINEAR	·	2.3 km	MPC · JPL
157944	2000 AV_{30}	—	January 3, 2000	Socorro	LINEAR	·	5.4 km	MPC · JPL
157945	2000 AV_{49}	—	January 6, 2000	Socorro	LINEAR	PHO	2.9 km	MPC · JPL
157946	2000 AL_{79}	—	January 5, 2000	Socorro	LINEAR	·	5.3 km	MPC · JPL
157947	2000 AB_{158}	—	January 3, 2000	Socorro	LINEAR	·	5.6 km	MPC · JPL
157948	2000 AW_{208}	—	January 4, 2000	Kitt Peak	Spacewatch	·	1.4 km	MPC · JPL
157949	2000 BE_{33}	—	January 29, 2000	Kitt Peak	Spacewatch	·	4.2 km	MPC · JPL
157950	2000 CN_{40}	—	February 3, 2000	Višnjan Observatory	K. Korlević	·	4.9 km	MPC · JPL
157951	2000 CB_{72}	—	February 7, 2000	Kitt Peak	Spacewatch	·	3.8 km	MPC · JPL
157952	2000 CX_{111}	—	February 7, 2000	Kitt Peak	Spacewatch	·	7.7 km	MPC · JPL
157953	2000 CF_{136}	—	February 3, 2000	Kitt Peak	Spacewatch	·	6.1 km	MPC · JPL
157954	2000 DX_{1}	—	February 26, 2000	Kitt Peak	Spacewatch	·	920 m	MPC · JPL
157955	2000 DE_{21}	—	February 29, 2000	Socorro	LINEAR	·	1.2 km	MPC · JPL
157956	2000 DO_{31}	—	February 29, 2000	Socorro	LINEAR	·	1.0 km	MPC · JPL
157957	2000 DG_{71}	—	February 29, 2000	Socorro	LINEAR	·	1.6 km	MPC · JPL
157958	2000 DL_{86}	—	February 29, 2000	Socorro	LINEAR	·	1.3 km	MPC · JPL
157959	2000 DL_{113}	—	February 27, 2000	Kitt Peak	Spacewatch	·	4.7 km	MPC · JPL
157960	2000 EP_{53}	—	March 8, 2000	Kitt Peak	Spacewatch	·	910 m	MPC · JPL
157961	2000 EY_{79}	—	March 5, 2000	Socorro	LINEAR	·	4.8 km	MPC · JPL
157962	2000 EX_{122}	—	March 11, 2000	Socorro	LINEAR	·	1.1 km	MPC · JPL
157963	2000 EO_{129}	—	March 11, 2000	Anderson Mesa	LONEOS	·	1.9 km	MPC · JPL
157964	2000 ET_{134}	—	March 11, 2000	Anderson Mesa	LONEOS	·	1.5 km	MPC · JPL
157965	2000 FY_{57}	—	March 26, 2000	Anderson Mesa	LONEOS	V	1.2 km	MPC · JPL
157966	2000 GY_{3}	—	April 6, 2000	Prescott	P. G. Comba	·	900 m	MPC · JPL
157967	2000 GX_{21}	—	April 5, 2000	Socorro	LINEAR	·	990 m	MPC · JPL
157968	2000 GP_{24}	—	April 5, 2000	Socorro	LINEAR	·	1.1 km	MPC · JPL
157969	2000 GE_{29}	—	April 5, 2000	Socorro	LINEAR	NYS	1.4 km	MPC · JPL
157970	2000 GJ_{30}	—	April 5, 2000	Socorro	LINEAR	·	1.4 km	MPC · JPL
157971	2000 GN_{53}	—	April 5, 2000	Socorro	LINEAR	·	1.0 km	MPC · JPL
157972	2000 GY_{78}	—	April 5, 2000	Socorro	LINEAR	·	1.1 km	MPC · JPL
157973	2000 GY_{80}	—	April 6, 2000	Socorro	LINEAR	·	1.7 km	MPC · JPL
157974	2000 GM_{86}	—	April 4, 2000	Socorro	LINEAR	·	1.1 km	MPC · JPL
157975	2000 GQ_{138}	—	April 4, 2000	Anderson Mesa	LONEOS	·	1.1 km	MPC · JPL
157976	2000 HC_{6}	—	April 24, 2000	Kitt Peak	Spacewatch	·	1.4 km	MPC · JPL
157977	2000 HN_{6}	—	April 24, 2000	Kitt Peak	Spacewatch	·	2.1 km	MPC · JPL
157978	2000 HD_{25}	—	April 24, 2000	Anderson Mesa	LONEOS	·	1.3 km	MPC · JPL
157979	2000 HB_{28}	—	April 28, 2000	Socorro	LINEAR	PHO	1.8 km	MPC · JPL
157980	2000 HY_{59}	—	April 25, 2000	Anderson Mesa	LONEOS	·	1.4 km	MPC · JPL
157981	2000 HD_{65}	—	April 26, 2000	Anderson Mesa	LONEOS	·	1.3 km	MPC · JPL
157982	2000 HJ_{93}	—	April 29, 2000	Socorro	LINEAR	·	2.2 km	MPC · JPL
157983	2000 HL_{96}	—	April 28, 2000	Anderson Mesa	LONEOS	·	1.6 km	MPC · JPL
157984	2000 JP_{1}	—	May 1, 2000	Socorro	LINEAR	·	1.2 km	MPC · JPL
157985	2000 JB_{34}	—	May 7, 2000	Socorro	LINEAR	·	1.1 km	MPC · JPL
157986	2000 KO_{7}	—	May 27, 2000	Socorro	LINEAR	·	1.7 km	MPC · JPL
157987	2000 KX_{12}	—	May 28, 2000	Socorro	LINEAR	·	1.3 km	MPC · JPL
157988	2000 KT_{16}	—	May 28, 2000	Socorro	LINEAR	·	1.6 km	MPC · JPL
157989	2000 KU_{26}	—	May 28, 2000	Socorro	LINEAR	·	2.0 km	MPC · JPL
157990	2000 KE_{29}	—	May 28, 2000	Socorro	LINEAR	·	1.5 km	MPC · JPL
157991	2000 KZ_{42}	—	May 25, 2000	Kitt Peak	Spacewatch	·	1.6 km	MPC · JPL
157992	2000 KP_{52}	—	May 24, 2000	Anderson Mesa	LONEOS	·	1.1 km	MPC · JPL
157993	2000 LP_{8}	—	June 3, 2000	Ondřejov	P. Pravec, P. Kušnirák	·	1.5 km	MPC · JPL
157994	2000 LH_{15}	—	June 4, 2000	Kitt Peak	Spacewatch	·	1.6 km	MPC · JPL
157995	2000 LF_{26}	—	June 1, 2000	Socorro	LINEAR	·	2.2 km	MPC · JPL
157996	2000 LW_{26}	—	June 5, 2000	Anderson Mesa	LONEOS	·	1.3 km	MPC · JPL
157997	2000 LG_{32}	—	June 5, 2000	Anderson Mesa	LONEOS	T_{j} (2.99) · 3:2	11 km	MPC · JPL
157998	2000 OU_{8}	—	July 23, 2000	Socorro	LINEAR	PHO	1.5 km	MPC · JPL
157999	2000 OE_{9}	—	July 30, 2000	Prescott	P. G. Comba	3:2	8.0 km	MPC · JPL
158000	2000 OK_{33}	—	July 30, 2000	Socorro	LINEAR	HIL · 3:2	9.7 km	MPC · JPL

back to top

== See also ==
- Meanings of minor-planet names: 157001–158000
