= Meanings of minor-planet names: 158001–159000 =

As minor planet discoveries are confirmed, they are given a permanent number by the IAU's Minor Planet Center (MPC), and the discoverers can then submit names for them, following the IAU's naming conventions. The list below concerns those minor planets in the specified number-range that have received names, and explains the meanings of those names.

Official naming citations of newly named small Solar System bodies are approved and published in a bulletin by IAU's Working Group for Small Bodies Nomenclature (WGSBN). Before May 2021, citations were published in MPC's Minor Planet Circulars for many decades. Recent citations can also be found on the JPL Small-Body Database (SBDB). Until his death in 2016, German astronomer Lutz D. Schmadel compiled these citations into the Dictionary of Minor Planet Names (DMP) and regularly updated the collection.

Based on Paul Herget's The Names of the Minor Planets, Schmadel also researched the unclear origin of numerous asteroids, most of which had been named prior to World War II. This article incorporates text from this source, which is in the public domain: SBDB New namings may only be added to this list below after official publication as the preannouncement of names is condemned. The WGSBN publishes a comprehensive guideline for the naming rules of non-cometary small Solar System bodies.

== 158001–158100 ==
Named minor planet	Provisional	This minor planet was named for...	Ref · Catalog
158092 Frasercain	2000 WM_{68}	Fraser Cain (born 1971), Canadian engineer, book and magazine author, YouTuber and astronomy popularizer, and publisher of Universe Today	JPL · 158092

== 158101–158200 ==
back to top

Named minor planet	Provisional	This minor planet was named for...	Ref · Catalog
There are no named minor planets in this number range

== 158201–158300 ==
back to top

Named minor planet	Provisional	This minor planet was named for...	Ref · Catalog
158222 Manicolas	2001 SP_{169}	Marie-Annick Nicolas (born 1956), Swiss violinist, born in Le Creusot, France, location of the Le Creusot Observatory (504) where this minor planet was discovered	JPL · 158222
158241 Yutonagatomo	2001 TF_{14}	Yuto Nagatomo (born 1986), Japanese football player for the J-League's Tokyo Football Club	JPL · 158241

== 158301–158400 ==
back to top

Named minor planet	Provisional	This minor planet was named for...	Ref · Catalog
158329 Stevekent	2001 VJ_{127}	Stephen Kent (born 1952), American astronomer with the Sloan Digital Sky Survey who studies the structure of galaxies and clusters	JPL · 158329

== 158401–158500 ==
back to top

Named minor planet	Provisional	This minor planet was named for...	Ref · Catalog
158472 Tiffanyfinley	2002 CC_{274}	Tiffany J. Finley (born 1976) is a principal engineer at the Southwest Research Institute. She served as the Science Operations Center Manager for the New Horizons Mission to Pluto.	JPL · 158472

== 158501–158600 ==
back to top

Named minor planet	Provisional	This minor planet was named for...	Ref · Catalog
158520 Ricardoferreira	2002 FR_{1}	Ricardo Ferreira (born 1928), Brazilian physicochemist	JPL · 158520
158589 Snodgrass	2002 MQ_{4}	Colin Snodgrass (born 1981), British astronomer at the European Southern Observatory	JPL · 158589

== 158601–158700 ==
back to top

Named minor planet	Provisional	This minor planet was named for...	Ref · Catalog
158623 Perali	2003 BS_{4}	Mirella Perali (born 1931), Italian amateur astronomer, author of several biographies of scientists and essays on the interplay between astronomy and classical literature	JPL · 158623
158657 Célian	2003 EF	Célian Hernandez (born 2010), the second son of astronomer Michel Hernandez, one of the discoverers at the Observatory of Saint-Veran in France	JPL · 158657

== 158701–158800 ==
back to top

Named minor planet	Provisional	This minor planet was named for...	Ref · Catalog
There are no named minor planets in this number range

== 158801–158900 ==
back to top

Named minor planet	Provisional	This minor planet was named for...	Ref · Catalog
158899 Malloryvale	2004 QO	Mallory Vale (born 1986), observer at the Table Mountain Observatory in California who made astrometric measurements of near-Earth objects and comets	JPL · 158899

== 158901–159000 ==
back to top

Named minor planet	Provisional	This minor planet was named for...	Ref · Catalog
158913 Kreider	2004 RC_{25}	Christian Kreider (born 1957), French amateur astronomer	JPL · 158913

back to top

Preceded by 157,001–158,000	Meanings of minor-planet names List of minor planets: 158,001–159,000	Succeeded by 159,001–160,000
