= List of minor planets: 158001–159000 =

The following is a partial list of minor planets, running from minor-planet number 158001 through 159000, inclusive. The primary data for this and other partial lists is based on JPL's "Small-Body Orbital Elements" and data available from the Minor Planet Center. Critical list information is also provided by the MPC, unless otherwise specified from Lowell Observatory. A detailed description of the table's columns and additional sources are given on the main page including a complete list of every page in this series, and a statistical break-up on the dynamical classification of minor planets.

Also see the summary list of all named bodies in numerical and alphabetical order, and the corresponding naming citations for the number range of this particular list. New namings may only be added to this list after official publication, as the preannouncement of names is condemned by the Working Group for Small Bodies Nomenclature of the International Astronomical Union.

Near-Earth obj.	MBA (inner)	MBA (outer)	Centaur
Mars-crosser	MBA (middle)	Jupiter trojan	Trans-Neptunian obj.
Unclassified

== 158001–158100 ==
Designation			Discovery			Properties		Ref
Permanent	Provisional	Named after	Date	Site	Discoverer(s)	Category	Diam.	Ref
158001	2000 OY_{53}	—	July 29, 2000	Anderson Mesa	LONEOS	MAS	1.1 km	MPC · JPL
158002	2000 PG_{7}	—	August 5, 2000	Bisei SG Center	BATTeRS	·	3.3 km	MPC · JPL
158003	2000 PN_{12}	—	August 3, 2000	Socorro	LINEAR	·	2.9 km	MPC · JPL
158004	2000 QY_{19}	—	August 24, 2000	Socorro	LINEAR	·	1.7 km	MPC · JPL
158005	2000 QO_{23}	—	August 25, 2000	Socorro	LINEAR	NYS	1.8 km	MPC · JPL
158006	2000 QS_{25}	—	August 26, 2000	Socorro	LINEAR	PHO	1.5 km	MPC · JPL
158007	2000 QZ_{36}	—	August 24, 2000	Socorro	LINEAR	·	2.2 km	MPC · JPL
158008	2000 QD_{47}	—	August 24, 2000	Socorro	LINEAR	·	1.5 km	MPC · JPL
158009	2000 QP_{106}	—	August 29, 2000	Socorro	LINEAR	·	1.6 km	MPC · JPL
158010	2000 QU_{109}	—	August 28, 2000	Ondřejov	P. Kušnirák	·	2.3 km	MPC · JPL
158011	2000 QP_{112}	—	August 24, 2000	Socorro	LINEAR	·	2.0 km	MPC · JPL
158012	2000 QE_{114}	—	August 24, 2000	Socorro	LINEAR	·	1.5 km	MPC · JPL
158013	2000 QW_{148}	—	August 29, 2000	Siding Spring	R. H. McNaught	PHO	2.2 km	MPC · JPL
158014	2000 QP_{165}	—	August 31, 2000	Socorro	LINEAR	·	2.4 km	MPC · JPL
158015	2000 QT_{177}	—	August 31, 2000	Socorro	LINEAR	·	1.7 km	MPC · JPL
158016	2000 QX_{177}	—	August 31, 2000	Socorro	LINEAR	·	1.7 km	MPC · JPL
158017	2000 QO_{178}	—	August 31, 2000	Socorro	LINEAR	V	1.1 km	MPC · JPL
158018	2000 QY_{219}	—	August 21, 2000	Anderson Mesa	LONEOS	NYS	1.8 km	MPC · JPL
158019	2000 QJ_{224}	—	August 26, 2000	Kitt Peak	Spacewatch	·	1.7 km	MPC · JPL
158020	2000 QR_{254}	—	August 26, 2000	Socorro	LINEAR	PHO	1.9 km	MPC · JPL
158021	2000 RQ	—	September 1, 2000	Socorro	LINEAR	·	2.1 km	MPC · JPL
158022	2000 RY_{11}	—	September 1, 2000	Socorro	LINEAR	·	3.6 km	MPC · JPL
158023	2000 RP_{22}	—	September 1, 2000	Socorro	LINEAR	·	2.2 km	MPC · JPL
158024	2000 RK_{25}	—	September 1, 2000	Socorro	LINEAR	·	2.2 km	MPC · JPL
158025	2000 RG_{72}	—	September 2, 2000	Socorro	LINEAR	(5)	4.0 km	MPC · JPL
158026	2000 RO_{80}	—	September 1, 2000	Socorro	LINEAR	·	2.9 km	MPC · JPL
158027	2000 SN_{5}	—	September 21, 2000	Socorro	LINEAR	·	2.5 km	MPC · JPL
158028	2000 SS_{9}	—	September 23, 2000	Socorro	LINEAR	·	6.2 km	MPC · JPL
158029	2000 SQ_{31}	—	September 24, 2000	Socorro	LINEAR	NYS ·	1.5 km	MPC · JPL
158030	2000 SU_{34}	—	September 24, 2000	Socorro	LINEAR	NYS	1.9 km	MPC · JPL
158031	2000 SV_{36}	—	September 24, 2000	Socorro	LINEAR	·	2.0 km	MPC · JPL
158032	2000 SR_{38}	—	September 24, 2000	Socorro	LINEAR	(18466)	4.2 km	MPC · JPL
158033	2000 SW_{40}	—	September 24, 2000	Socorro	LINEAR	·	2.0 km	MPC · JPL
158034	2000 SB_{50}	—	September 23, 2000	Socorro	LINEAR	·	2.0 km	MPC · JPL
158035	2000 SA_{56}	—	September 24, 2000	Socorro	LINEAR	·	2.5 km	MPC · JPL
158036	2000 SJ_{57}	—	September 24, 2000	Socorro	LINEAR	·	1.9 km	MPC · JPL
158037	2000 SD_{66}	—	September 24, 2000	Socorro	LINEAR	·	2.4 km	MPC · JPL
158038	2000 SF_{67}	—	September 24, 2000	Socorro	LINEAR	(5)	1.7 km	MPC · JPL
158039	2000 SP_{76}	—	September 24, 2000	Socorro	LINEAR	·	2.6 km	MPC · JPL
158040	2000 SB_{80}	—	September 24, 2000	Socorro	LINEAR	·	1.7 km	MPC · JPL
158041	2000 SY_{89}	—	September 22, 2000	Socorro	LINEAR	·	2.3 km	MPC · JPL
158042	2000 SK_{112}	—	September 24, 2000	Socorro	LINEAR	·	3.2 km	MPC · JPL
158043	2000 SQ_{121}	—	September 24, 2000	Socorro	LINEAR	·	3.3 km	MPC · JPL
158044	2000 SY_{125}	—	September 24, 2000	Socorro	LINEAR	·	1.9 km	MPC · JPL
158045	2000 SC_{133}	—	September 23, 2000	Socorro	LINEAR	·	6.4 km	MPC · JPL
158046	2000 SE_{139}	—	September 23, 2000	Socorro	LINEAR	·	1.8 km	MPC · JPL
158047	2000 SE_{181}	—	September 19, 2000	Haleakala	NEAT	·	2.1 km	MPC · JPL
158048	2000 SR_{183}	—	September 20, 2000	Haleakala	NEAT	·	1.9 km	MPC · JPL
158049	2000 SX_{189}	—	September 22, 2000	Haleakala	NEAT	·	3.5 km	MPC · JPL
158050	2000 SQ_{198}	—	September 24, 2000	Socorro	LINEAR	·	1.7 km	MPC · JPL
158051	2000 SP_{206}	—	September 24, 2000	Socorro	LINEAR	·	1.6 km	MPC · JPL
158052	2000 SE_{226}	—	September 27, 2000	Socorro	LINEAR	·	2.2 km	MPC · JPL
158053	2000 SW_{228}	—	September 28, 2000	Socorro	LINEAR	·	2.3 km	MPC · JPL
158054	2000 SY_{228}	—	September 28, 2000	Socorro	LINEAR	·	2.2 km	MPC · JPL
158055	2000 SP_{234}	—	September 22, 2000	Socorro	LINEAR	(5)	2.4 km	MPC · JPL
158056	2000 SD_{250}	—	September 24, 2000	Socorro	LINEAR	·	1.5 km	MPC · JPL
158057	2000 SK_{272}	—	September 28, 2000	Socorro	LINEAR	·	4.0 km	MPC · JPL
158058	2000 SZ_{322}	—	September 28, 2000	Socorro	LINEAR	·	5.9 km	MPC · JPL
158059	2000 SW_{358}	—	September 25, 2000	Haleakala	NEAT	·	4.9 km	MPC · JPL
158060	2000 TO_{12}	—	October 1, 2000	Socorro	LINEAR	·	3.0 km	MPC · JPL
158061	2000 TJ_{18}	—	October 1, 2000	Socorro	LINEAR	·	2.0 km	MPC · JPL
158062	2000 TJ_{38}	—	October 1, 2000	Socorro	LINEAR	·	2.0 km	MPC · JPL
158063	2000 TD_{40}	—	October 1, 2000	Socorro	LINEAR	·	1.6 km	MPC · JPL
158064	2000 TT_{42}	—	October 1, 2000	Socorro	LINEAR	·	2.3 km	MPC · JPL
158065	2000 TH_{57}	—	October 2, 2000	Anderson Mesa	LONEOS	·	1.9 km	MPC · JPL
158066	2000 TN_{58}	—	October 2, 2000	Socorro	LINEAR	·	1.8 km	MPC · JPL
158067	2000 UF_{5}	—	October 24, 2000	Socorro	LINEAR	·	2.4 km	MPC · JPL
158068	2000 UV_{11}	—	October 25, 2000	Kitt Peak	Spacewatch	·	3.7 km	MPC · JPL
158069	2000 UN_{17}	—	October 24, 2000	Socorro	LINEAR	(5)	2.0 km	MPC · JPL
158070	2000 UH_{22}	—	October 24, 2000	Socorro	LINEAR	(5)	1.7 km	MPC · JPL
158071	2000 UG_{29}	—	October 24, 2000	Socorro	LINEAR	HNS	1.8 km	MPC · JPL
158072	2000 UP_{38}	—	October 24, 2000	Socorro	LINEAR	(5)	2.1 km	MPC · JPL
158073	2000 UJ_{41}	—	October 24, 2000	Socorro	LINEAR	fast	3.1 km	MPC · JPL
158074	2000 UB_{49}	—	October 24, 2000	Socorro	LINEAR	EUN ·	4.1 km	MPC · JPL
158075	2000 US_{50}	—	October 24, 2000	Socorro	LINEAR	·	4.3 km	MPC · JPL
158076	2000 UO_{60}	—	October 25, 2000	Socorro	LINEAR	·	4.3 km	MPC · JPL
158077	2000 UJ_{81}	—	October 24, 2000	Socorro	LINEAR	(5)	1.9 km	MPC · JPL
158078	2000 UX_{90}	—	October 24, 2000	Socorro	LINEAR	(5)	1.9 km	MPC · JPL
158079	2000 UW_{106}	—	October 30, 2000	Socorro	LINEAR	·	4.6 km	MPC · JPL
158080	2000 US_{107}	—	October 30, 2000	Socorro	LINEAR	RAF	1.6 km	MPC · JPL
158081	2000 VP	—	November 1, 2000	Kitt Peak	Spacewatch	·	2.5 km	MPC · JPL
158082	2000 VT_{4}	—	November 1, 2000	Socorro	LINEAR	·	2.3 km	MPC · JPL
158083	2000 VK_{12}	—	November 1, 2000	Socorro	LINEAR	·	1.8 km	MPC · JPL
158084	2000 VX_{12}	—	November 1, 2000	Socorro	LINEAR	·	3.1 km	MPC · JPL
158085	2000 VU_{30}	—	November 1, 2000	Socorro	LINEAR	ADE	2.7 km	MPC · JPL
158086	2000 VT_{44}	—	November 2, 2000	Socorro	LINEAR	H	920 m	MPC · JPL
158087	2000 VN_{48}	—	November 2, 2000	Socorro	LINEAR	·	2.4 km	MPC · JPL
158088	2000 WV_{15}	—	November 21, 2000	Socorro	LINEAR	DOR	4.1 km	MPC · JPL
158089	2000 WT_{25}	—	November 21, 2000	Socorro	LINEAR	·	1.5 km	MPC · JPL
158090	2000 WL_{47}	—	November 21, 2000	Socorro	LINEAR	·	2.4 km	MPC · JPL
158091	2000 WH_{56}	—	November 20, 2000	Socorro	LINEAR	·	5.3 km	MPC · JPL
158092 Frasercain	2000 WM_{68}	Frasercain	November 28, 2000	Junk Bond	J. Medkeff	·	4.2 km	MPC · JPL
158093	2000 WT_{89}	—	November 21, 2000	Socorro	LINEAR	·	3.6 km	MPC · JPL
158094	2000 WX_{90}	—	November 21, 2000	Socorro	LINEAR	(5)	2.6 km	MPC · JPL
158095	2000 WH_{100}	—	November 21, 2000	Socorro	LINEAR	·	3.0 km	MPC · JPL
158096	2000 WV_{146}	—	November 28, 2000	Haleakala	NEAT	BAR	2.2 km	MPC · JPL
158097	2000 WH_{164}	—	November 21, 2000	Haleakala	NEAT	·	4.8 km	MPC · JPL
158098	2000 WZ_{190}	—	November 19, 2000	Anderson Mesa	LONEOS	·	2.5 km	MPC · JPL
158099	2000 XX_{2}	—	December 1, 2000	Socorro	LINEAR	·	3.7 km	MPC · JPL
158100	2000 XE_{11}	—	December 1, 2000	Socorro	LINEAR	EUN	3.7 km	MPC · JPL

== 158101–158200 ==
back to top

Designation			Discovery			Properties		Ref
Permanent	Provisional	Named after	Date	Site	Discoverer(s)	Category	Diam.	Ref
158101	2000 XN_{26}	—	December 4, 2000	Socorro	LINEAR	slow	4.2 km	MPC · JPL
158102	2000 XD_{30}	—	December 4, 2000	Socorro	LINEAR	·	4.1 km	MPC · JPL
158103	2000 XC_{39}	—	December 5, 2000	Socorro	LINEAR	H	1.1 km	MPC · JPL
158104	2000 YE_{5}	—	December 20, 2000	Socorro	LINEAR	H	950 m	MPC · JPL
158105	2000 YH_{12}	—	December 24, 2000	Haleakala	NEAT	·	2.0 km	MPC · JPL
158106	2000 YB_{18}	—	December 20, 2000	Socorro	LINEAR	EUN	2.7 km	MPC · JPL
158107	2000 YB_{48}	—	December 30, 2000	Socorro	LINEAR	·	3.2 km	MPC · JPL
158108	2000 YB_{95}	—	December 30, 2000	Socorro	LINEAR	PAD	3.2 km	MPC · JPL
158109	2000 YG_{112}	—	December 30, 2000	Socorro	LINEAR	DOR	4.7 km	MPC · JPL
158110	2001 AW_{21}	—	January 3, 2001	Socorro	LINEAR	·	3.1 km	MPC · JPL
158111	2001 AM_{43}	—	January 4, 2001	Anderson Mesa	LONEOS	·	3.8 km	MPC · JPL
158112	2001 BZ_{65}	—	January 26, 2001	Socorro	LINEAR	·	5.0 km	MPC · JPL
158113	2001 BX_{69}	—	January 31, 2001	Socorro	LINEAR	TIR	4.9 km	MPC · JPL
158114	2001 BR_{77}	—	January 25, 2001	Kitt Peak	Spacewatch	·	2.4 km	MPC · JPL
158115	2001 CQ_{1}	—	February 1, 2001	Socorro	LINEAR	·	4.3 km	MPC · JPL
158116	2001 CM_{5}	—	February 1, 2001	Socorro	LINEAR	·	2.5 km	MPC · JPL
158117	2001 CN_{8}	—	February 1, 2001	Socorro	LINEAR	·	4.3 km	MPC · JPL
158118	2001 CL_{15}	—	February 1, 2001	Socorro	LINEAR	·	2.5 km	MPC · JPL
158119	2001 DX_{5}	—	February 16, 2001	Socorro	LINEAR	LIX	7.1 km	MPC · JPL
158120	2001 DK_{20}	—	February 16, 2001	Socorro	LINEAR	·	4.2 km	MPC · JPL
158121	2001 DU_{31}	—	February 17, 2001	Socorro	LINEAR	·	3.6 km	MPC · JPL
158122	2001 DV_{37}	—	February 19, 2001	Socorro	LINEAR	·	3.7 km	MPC · JPL
158123	2001 DB_{44}	—	February 19, 2001	Socorro	LINEAR	·	5.3 km	MPC · JPL
158124	2001 DL_{61}	—	February 19, 2001	Socorro	LINEAR	·	4.3 km	MPC · JPL
158125	2001 DQ_{87}	—	February 21, 2001	Anderson Mesa	LONEOS	·	3.3 km	MPC · JPL
158126	2001 EU_{4}	—	March 2, 2001	Anderson Mesa	LONEOS	·	4.7 km	MPC · JPL
158127	2001 EP_{21}	—	March 15, 2001	Anderson Mesa	LONEOS	·	4.9 km	MPC · JPL
158128	2001 ES_{26}	—	March 2, 2001	Anderson Mesa	LONEOS	HYG	5.0 km	MPC · JPL
158129	2001 FA_{2}	—	March 16, 2001	Socorro	LINEAR	·	8.8 km	MPC · JPL
158130	2001 FM_{9}	—	March 18, 2001	Kitt Peak	Spacewatch	HYG	5.9 km	MPC · JPL
158131	2001 FT_{10}	—	March 19, 2001	Anderson Mesa	LONEOS	·	6.8 km	MPC · JPL
158132	2001 FM_{17}	—	March 19, 2001	Anderson Mesa	LONEOS	·	9.5 km	MPC · JPL
158133	2001 FT_{26}	—	March 18, 2001	Socorro	LINEAR	·	5.8 km	MPC · JPL
158134	2001 FT_{64}	—	March 19, 2001	Socorro	LINEAR	HYG	4.2 km	MPC · JPL
158135	2001 FL_{65}	—	March 19, 2001	Socorro	LINEAR	·	5.8 km	MPC · JPL
158136	2001 FM_{67}	—	March 19, 2001	Socorro	LINEAR	·	5.3 km	MPC · JPL
158137	2001 FB_{71}	—	March 19, 2001	Socorro	LINEAR	·	5.1 km	MPC · JPL
158138	2001 FE_{81}	—	March 23, 2001	Socorro	LINEAR	THB	6.0 km	MPC · JPL
158139	2001 FT_{92}	—	March 16, 2001	Socorro	LINEAR	·	5.2 km	MPC · JPL
158140	2001 FO_{100}	—	March 17, 2001	Kitt Peak	Spacewatch	·	4.7 km	MPC · JPL
158141	2001 FL_{102}	—	March 17, 2001	Socorro	LINEAR	·	7.1 km	MPC · JPL
158142	2001 FA_{106}	—	March 18, 2001	Anderson Mesa	LONEOS	·	4.6 km	MPC · JPL
158143	2001 FL_{107}	—	March 18, 2001	Anderson Mesa	LONEOS	·	4.5 km	MPC · JPL
158144	2001 FT_{115}	—	March 19, 2001	Anderson Mesa	LONEOS	EOS	3.5 km	MPC · JPL
158145	2001 FP_{121}	—	March 23, 2001	Haleakala	NEAT	EOS	4.1 km	MPC · JPL
158146	2001 FU_{124}	—	March 29, 2001	Anderson Mesa	LONEOS	·	4.8 km	MPC · JPL
158147	2001 FH_{130}	—	March 29, 2001	Socorro	LINEAR	EMA	5.8 km	MPC · JPL
158148	2001 FN_{146}	—	March 24, 2001	Anderson Mesa	LONEOS	·	5.3 km	MPC · JPL
158149	2001 FS_{152}	—	March 26, 2001	Socorro	LINEAR	HYG	4.6 km	MPC · JPL
158150	2001 GV_{8}	—	April 15, 2001	Socorro	LINEAR	TIR	5.7 km	MPC · JPL
158151	2001 HK_{11}	—	April 18, 2001	Socorro	LINEAR	VER	7.0 km	MPC · JPL
158152	2001 HO_{50}	—	April 22, 2001	Haleakala	NEAT	T_{j} (2.9) · CYB	7.1 km	MPC · JPL
158153	2001 KE_{49}	—	May 24, 2001	Socorro	LINEAR	·	1.6 km	MPC · JPL
158154	2001 NY	—	July 12, 2001	Palomar	NEAT	·	1.4 km	MPC · JPL
158155	2001 NA_{22}	—	July 14, 2001	Palomar	NEAT	V	1.4 km	MPC · JPL
158156	2001 OR_{10}	—	July 19, 2001	Palomar	NEAT	·	9.8 km	MPC · JPL
158157	2001 OE_{60}	—	July 21, 2001	Haleakala	NEAT	·	1.2 km	MPC · JPL
158158	2001 OP_{94}	—	July 27, 2001	Anderson Mesa	LONEOS	T_{j} (2.95) · HIL	7.1 km	MPC · JPL
158159	2001 PZ_{7}	—	August 10, 2001	Palomar	NEAT	V	1.0 km	MPC · JPL
158160	2001 PC_{20}	—	August 10, 2001	Palomar	NEAT	·	1.1 km	MPC · JPL
158161	2001 QE_{17}	—	August 16, 2001	Socorro	LINEAR	·	1.6 km	MPC · JPL
158162	2001 QW_{23}	—	August 16, 2001	Socorro	LINEAR	·	1.4 km	MPC · JPL
158163	2001 QB_{73}	—	August 17, 2001	Needville	Needville	·	1.2 km	MPC · JPL
158164	2001 QL_{73}	—	August 19, 2001	Socorro	LINEAR	PHO	2.1 km	MPC · JPL
158165	2001 QS_{88}	—	August 22, 2001	Kitt Peak	Spacewatch	·	1.0 km	MPC · JPL
158166	2001 QG_{105}	—	August 23, 2001	Socorro	LINEAR	·	1.2 km	MPC · JPL
158167	2001 QS_{197}	—	August 22, 2001	Socorro	LINEAR	·	1.9 km	MPC · JPL
158168	2001 QQ_{206}	—	August 23, 2001	Anderson Mesa	LONEOS	·	810 m	MPC · JPL
158169	2001 QR_{215}	—	August 23, 2001	Anderson Mesa	LONEOS	NYS ·	3.7 km	MPC · JPL
158170	2001 QN_{221}	—	August 24, 2001	Anderson Mesa	LONEOS	HIL · 3:2	10 km	MPC · JPL
158171	2001 QD_{231}	—	August 24, 2001	Anderson Mesa	LONEOS	·	1.1 km	MPC · JPL
158172	2001 QD_{239}	—	August 24, 2001	Socorro	LINEAR	NYS	2.1 km	MPC · JPL
158173	2001 QH_{247}	—	August 24, 2001	Socorro	LINEAR	·	1.6 km	MPC · JPL
158174	2001 QB_{251}	—	August 24, 2001	Haleakala	NEAT	·	1.3 km	MPC · JPL
158175	2001 QE_{260}	—	August 25, 2001	Socorro	LINEAR	·	1.4 km	MPC · JPL
158176	2001 QO_{264}	—	August 26, 2001	Črni Vrh	Skvarč, J.	NYS	2.0 km	MPC · JPL
158177	2001 QQ_{277}	—	August 19, 2001	Socorro	LINEAR	·	1.2 km	MPC · JPL
158178	2001 QJ_{291}	—	August 16, 2001	Socorro	LINEAR	·	2.5 km	MPC · JPL
158179	2001 QM_{295}	—	August 24, 2001	Socorro	LINEAR	·	1.7 km	MPC · JPL
158180	2001 RX_{1}	—	September 7, 2001	Socorro	LINEAR	·	1.1 km	MPC · JPL
158181	2001 RH_{5}	—	September 8, 2001	Socorro	LINEAR	·	1.4 km	MPC · JPL
158182	2001 RM_{13}	—	September 10, 2001	Socorro	LINEAR	·	1.9 km	MPC · JPL
158183	2001 RF_{32}	—	September 8, 2001	Socorro	LINEAR	·	1.2 km	MPC · JPL
158184	2001 RP_{40}	—	September 11, 2001	Socorro	LINEAR	·	1.3 km	MPC · JPL
158185	2001 RM_{46}	—	September 13, 2001	Needville	W. G. Dillon, J. Jackson	NYS	1.7 km	MPC · JPL
158186	2001 RL_{76}	—	September 10, 2001	Socorro	LINEAR	·	1.9 km	MPC · JPL
158187	2001 RY_{85}	—	September 11, 2001	Anderson Mesa	LONEOS	·	860 m	MPC · JPL
158188	2001 RJ_{88}	—	September 11, 2001	Anderson Mesa	LONEOS	·	1.3 km	MPC · JPL
158189	2001 RO_{92}	—	September 11, 2001	Anderson Mesa	LONEOS	·	1.4 km	MPC · JPL
158190	2001 RR_{102}	—	September 12, 2001	Socorro	LINEAR	·	2.0 km	MPC · JPL
158191	2001 RU_{104}	—	September 12, 2001	Socorro	LINEAR	·	1.7 km	MPC · JPL
158192	2001 RD_{135}	—	September 12, 2001	Socorro	LINEAR	·	1.1 km	MPC · JPL
158193	2001 RA_{137}	—	September 12, 2001	Socorro	LINEAR	·	2.0 km	MPC · JPL
158194	2001 RC_{139}	—	September 12, 2001	Socorro	LINEAR	T_{j} (2.98) · 3:2	10 km	MPC · JPL
158195	2001 RR_{141}	—	September 12, 2001	Socorro	LINEAR	·	1.3 km	MPC · JPL
158196	2001 RK_{149}	—	September 10, 2001	Palomar	NEAT	·	1.1 km	MPC · JPL
158197	2001 SQ_{1}	—	September 17, 2001	Desert Eagle	W. K. Y. Yeung	NYS	1.6 km	MPC · JPL
158198	2001 SC_{10}	—	September 20, 2001	Desert Eagle	W. K. Y. Yeung	·	2.4 km	MPC · JPL
158199	2001 SV_{16}	—	September 16, 2001	Socorro	LINEAR	·	1.1 km	MPC · JPL
158200	2001 SU_{17}	—	September 16, 2001	Socorro	LINEAR	·	2.5 km	MPC · JPL

== 158201–158300 ==
back to top

Designation			Discovery			Properties		Ref
Permanent	Provisional	Named after	Date	Site	Discoverer(s)	Category	Diam.	Ref
158201	2001 SG_{18}	—	September 16, 2001	Socorro	LINEAR	·	1.8 km	MPC · JPL
158202	2001 SY_{20}	—	September 16, 2001	Socorro	LINEAR	·	1.5 km	MPC · JPL
158203	2001 SA_{27}	—	September 16, 2001	Socorro	LINEAR	·	2.2 km	MPC · JPL
158204	2001 SV_{46}	—	September 16, 2001	Socorro	LINEAR	·	1.6 km	MPC · JPL
158205	2001 SV_{48}	—	September 16, 2001	Socorro	LINEAR	V	1.1 km	MPC · JPL
158206	2001 SL_{52}	—	September 16, 2001	Socorro	LINEAR	·	2.3 km	MPC · JPL
158207	2001 SK_{55}	—	September 16, 2001	Socorro	LINEAR	ERI	3.3 km	MPC · JPL
158208	2001 SW_{57}	—	September 17, 2001	Socorro	LINEAR	·	1.3 km	MPC · JPL
158209	2001 SG_{59}	—	September 17, 2001	Socorro	LINEAR	·	950 m	MPC · JPL
158210	2001 SO_{60}	—	September 17, 2001	Socorro	LINEAR	NYS	1.6 km	MPC · JPL
158211	2001 SQ_{67}	—	September 17, 2001	Socorro	LINEAR	V	1.2 km	MPC · JPL
158212	2001 SU_{83}	—	September 20, 2001	Socorro	LINEAR	·	3.6 km	MPC · JPL
158213	2001 ST_{87}	—	September 20, 2001	Socorro	LINEAR	·	1.6 km	MPC · JPL
158214	2001 SU_{107}	—	September 20, 2001	Socorro	LINEAR	·	4.4 km	MPC · JPL
158215	2001 SL_{110}	—	September 20, 2001	Socorro	LINEAR	V	1.3 km	MPC · JPL
158216	2001 SV_{113}	—	September 20, 2001	Desert Eagle	W. K. Y. Yeung	·	2.1 km	MPC · JPL
158217	2001 SJ_{122}	—	September 16, 2001	Socorro	LINEAR	3:2	9.7 km	MPC · JPL
158218	2001 SG_{123}	—	September 16, 2001	Socorro	LINEAR	·	1.1 km	MPC · JPL
158219	2001 SZ_{136}	—	September 16, 2001	Socorro	LINEAR	·	1.9 km	MPC · JPL
158220	2001 SV_{139}	—	September 16, 2001	Socorro	LINEAR	·	1.9 km	MPC · JPL
158221	2001 SG_{162}	—	September 17, 2001	Socorro	LINEAR	·	1.1 km	MPC · JPL
158222 Manicolas	2001 SP_{169}	Manicolas	September 20, 2001	Le Creusot	J.-C. Merlin	·	1.4 km	MPC · JPL
158223	2001 SS_{182}	—	September 19, 2001	Socorro	LINEAR	·	1.2 km	MPC · JPL
158224	2001 SJ_{184}	—	September 19, 2001	Socorro	LINEAR	·	1.2 km	MPC · JPL
158225	2001 SB_{202}	—	September 19, 2001	Socorro	LINEAR	·	1.0 km	MPC · JPL
158226	2001 SK_{217}	—	September 19, 2001	Socorro	LINEAR	·	1.4 km	MPC · JPL
158227	2001 SO_{220}	—	September 19, 2001	Socorro	LINEAR	·	1.8 km	MPC · JPL
158228	2001 SF_{226}	—	September 19, 2001	Socorro	LINEAR	NYS	1.5 km	MPC · JPL
158229	2001 SG_{239}	—	September 19, 2001	Socorro	LINEAR	·	1.3 km	MPC · JPL
158230	2001 SH_{247}	—	September 19, 2001	Socorro	LINEAR	·	1.1 km	MPC · JPL
158231	2001 SJ_{256}	—	September 19, 2001	Socorro	LINEAR	L5	10 km	MPC · JPL
158232	2001 SO_{267}	—	September 25, 2001	Desert Eagle	W. K. Y. Yeung	·	1.2 km	MPC · JPL
158233	2001 SE_{272}	—	September 20, 2001	Socorro	LINEAR	NYS	1.7 km	MPC · JPL
158234	2001 SG_{282}	—	September 26, 2001	Socorro	LINEAR	·	890 m	MPC · JPL
158235	2001 SV_{293}	—	September 19, 2001	Socorro	LINEAR	·	1.5 km	MPC · JPL
158236	2001 SR_{307}	—	September 21, 2001	Socorro	LINEAR	·	3.5 km	MPC · JPL
158237	2001 SX_{314}	—	September 25, 2001	Socorro	LINEAR	·	1.1 km	MPC · JPL
158238	2001 SP_{353}	—	September 23, 2001	Kitt Peak	Spacewatch	·	1.7 km	MPC · JPL
158239	2001 TW_{2}	—	October 6, 2001	Palomar	NEAT	V	1.0 km	MPC · JPL
158240	2001 TD_{3}	—	October 7, 2001	Palomar	NEAT	·	1.6 km	MPC · JPL
158241 Yutonagatomo	2001 TF_{14}	Yutonagatomo	October 12, 2001	Kuma Kogen	A. Nakamura	V	1.2 km	MPC · JPL
158242	2001 TM_{24}	—	October 14, 2001	Socorro	LINEAR	·	1.9 km	MPC · JPL
158243	2001 TS_{26}	—	October 14, 2001	Socorro	LINEAR	·	1.9 km	MPC · JPL
158244	2001 TL_{47}	—	October 14, 2001	Cima Ekar	ADAS	·	1.5 km	MPC · JPL
158245	2001 TF_{60}	—	October 13, 2001	Socorro	LINEAR	·	1.3 km	MPC · JPL
158246	2001 TV_{60}	—	October 13, 2001	Socorro	LINEAR	V	1.2 km	MPC · JPL
158247	2001 TU_{61}	—	October 13, 2001	Socorro	LINEAR	·	1.3 km	MPC · JPL
158248	2001 TY_{61}	—	October 13, 2001	Socorro	LINEAR	NYS	1.7 km	MPC · JPL
158249	2001 TS_{63}	—	October 13, 2001	Socorro	LINEAR	·	2.3 km	MPC · JPL
158250	2001 TP_{65}	—	October 13, 2001	Socorro	LINEAR	MAS	1.2 km	MPC · JPL
158251	2001 TT_{74}	—	October 13, 2001	Socorro	LINEAR	·	1.8 km	MPC · JPL
158252	2001 TB_{76}	—	October 13, 2001	Socorro	LINEAR	·	3.1 km	MPC · JPL
158253	2001 TS_{78}	—	October 13, 2001	Socorro	LINEAR	NYS	2.5 km	MPC · JPL
158254	2001 TD_{92}	—	October 14, 2001	Socorro	LINEAR	·	2.2 km	MPC · JPL
158255	2001 TB_{96}	—	October 14, 2001	Socorro	LINEAR	·	1.3 km	MPC · JPL
158256	2001 TD_{109}	—	October 14, 2001	Socorro	LINEAR	·	1.3 km	MPC · JPL
158257	2001 TY_{126}	—	October 13, 2001	Kitt Peak	Spacewatch	·	1.6 km	MPC · JPL
158258	2001 TM_{130}	—	October 8, 2001	Palomar	NEAT	·	2.7 km	MPC · JPL
158259	2001 TL_{132}	—	October 11, 2001	Palomar	NEAT	V	860 m	MPC · JPL
158260	2001 TP_{148}	—	October 10, 2001	Palomar	NEAT	·	1.1 km	MPC · JPL
158261	2001 TB_{155}	—	October 11, 2001	Kitt Peak	Spacewatch	V	1.1 km	MPC · JPL
158262	2001 TN_{175}	—	October 14, 2001	Socorro	LINEAR	V	990 m	MPC · JPL
158263	2001 TW_{177}	—	October 14, 2001	Socorro	LINEAR	·	1.8 km	MPC · JPL
158264	2001 TZ_{177}	—	October 14, 2001	Socorro	LINEAR	·	1.1 km	MPC · JPL
158265	2001 TW_{180}	—	October 14, 2001	Socorro	LINEAR	·	1.5 km	MPC · JPL
158266	2001 TW_{190}	—	October 14, 2001	Socorro	LINEAR	·	2.6 km	MPC · JPL
158267	2001 TZ_{193}	—	October 15, 2001	Socorro	LINEAR	·	1.7 km	MPC · JPL
158268	2001 TJ_{199}	—	October 11, 2001	Socorro	LINEAR	·	940 m	MPC · JPL
158269	2001 TR_{208}	—	October 11, 2001	Palomar	NEAT	·	2.4 km	MPC · JPL
158270	2001 TT_{208}	—	October 11, 2001	Palomar	NEAT	·	4.3 km	MPC · JPL
158271	2001 TH_{231}	—	October 15, 2001	Palomar	NEAT	·	1.5 km	MPC · JPL
158272	2001 TE_{234}	—	October 15, 2001	Palomar	NEAT	·	2.2 km	MPC · JPL
158273	2001 UP_{2}	—	October 18, 2001	Desert Eagle	W. K. Y. Yeung	NYS	2.5 km	MPC · JPL
158274	2001 UM_{5}	—	October 18, 2001	Desert Eagle	W. K. Y. Yeung	·	1.6 km	MPC · JPL
158275	2001 UK_{8}	—	October 17, 2001	Socorro	LINEAR	NYS · fast	1.6 km	MPC · JPL
158276	2001 UA_{12}	—	October 23, 2001	Desert Eagle	W. K. Y. Yeung	·	1.9 km	MPC · JPL
158277	2001 UC_{15}	—	October 24, 2001	Desert Eagle	W. K. Y. Yeung	·	1.1 km	MPC · JPL
158278	2001 UF_{16}	—	October 25, 2001	Desert Eagle	W. K. Y. Yeung	·	2.3 km	MPC · JPL
158279	2001 UQ_{28}	—	October 16, 2001	Socorro	LINEAR	NYS	1.9 km	MPC · JPL
158280	2001 UC_{30}	—	October 16, 2001	Socorro	LINEAR	·	2.3 km	MPC · JPL
158281	2001 UP_{30}	—	October 16, 2001	Socorro	LINEAR	·	1.2 km	MPC · JPL
158282	2001 UR_{34}	—	October 16, 2001	Socorro	LINEAR	·	1.4 km	MPC · JPL
158283	2001 UP_{41}	—	October 17, 2001	Socorro	LINEAR	·	1.2 km	MPC · JPL
158284	2001 UF_{46}	—	October 17, 2001	Socorro	LINEAR	·	2.0 km	MPC · JPL
158285	2001 UV_{62}	—	October 17, 2001	Socorro	LINEAR	NYS	1.6 km	MPC · JPL
158286	2001 UZ_{65}	—	October 18, 2001	Socorro	LINEAR	·	2.1 km	MPC · JPL
158287	2001 UH_{75}	—	October 17, 2001	Socorro	LINEAR	V	1.2 km	MPC · JPL
158288	2001 UX_{77}	—	October 18, 2001	Socorro	LINEAR	·	2.0 km	MPC · JPL
158289	2001 UB_{81}	—	October 20, 2001	Socorro	LINEAR	·	2.1 km	MPC · JPL
158290	2001 UQ_{85}	—	October 16, 2001	Kitt Peak	Spacewatch	·	1.5 km	MPC · JPL
158291	2001 UN_{91}	—	October 18, 2001	Palomar	NEAT	·	1.5 km	MPC · JPL
158292	2001 UA_{100}	—	October 17, 2001	Socorro	LINEAR	·	3.8 km	MPC · JPL
158293	2001 UE_{100}	—	October 17, 2001	Socorro	LINEAR	·	1.9 km	MPC · JPL
158294	2001 UK_{104}	—	October 20, 2001	Socorro	LINEAR	NYS	1.4 km	MPC · JPL
158295	2001 UO_{107}	—	October 20, 2001	Socorro	LINEAR	NYS	1.6 km	MPC · JPL
158296	2001 UJ_{115}	—	October 22, 2001	Socorro	LINEAR	·	2.4 km	MPC · JPL
158297	2001 UN_{118}	—	October 22, 2001	Socorro	LINEAR	·	920 m	MPC · JPL
158298	2001 UL_{122}	—	October 22, 2001	Socorro	LINEAR	·	1.7 km	MPC · JPL
158299	2001 UC_{126}	—	October 23, 2001	Palomar	NEAT	·	1.0 km	MPC · JPL
158300	2001 UD_{129}	—	October 20, 2001	Socorro	LINEAR	·	1.3 km	MPC · JPL

== 158301–158400 ==
back to top

Designation			Discovery			Properties		Ref
Permanent	Provisional	Named after	Date	Site	Discoverer(s)	Category	Diam.	Ref
158301	2001 UJ_{139}	—	October 23, 2001	Socorro	LINEAR	·	1.2 km	MPC · JPL
158302	2001 UO_{145}	—	October 23, 2001	Socorro	LINEAR	·	2.0 km	MPC · JPL
158303	2001 UP_{149}	—	October 23, 2001	Socorro	LINEAR	·	1.5 km	MPC · JPL
158304	2001 UW_{154}	—	October 23, 2001	Socorro	LINEAR	·	2.0 km	MPC · JPL
158305	2001 UY_{160}	—	October 23, 2001	Socorro	LINEAR	·	2.4 km	MPC · JPL
158306	2001 UQ_{182}	—	October 16, 2001	Socorro	LINEAR	NYS	1.7 km	MPC · JPL
158307	2001 UT_{183}	—	October 16, 2001	Palomar	NEAT	·	1.1 km	MPC · JPL
158308	2001 UB_{206}	—	October 20, 2001	Socorro	LINEAR	EUN	2.5 km	MPC · JPL
158309	2001 VY_{3}	—	November 11, 2001	Kitt Peak	Spacewatch	NYS	2.0 km	MPC · JPL
158310	2001 VN_{6}	—	November 9, 2001	Socorro	LINEAR	NYS	2.0 km	MPC · JPL
158311	2001 VL_{8}	—	November 9, 2001	Socorro	LINEAR	MAS	1.3 km	MPC · JPL
158312	2001 VX_{17}	—	November 9, 2001	Socorro	LINEAR	·	3.3 km	MPC · JPL
158313	2001 VL_{19}	—	November 9, 2001	Socorro	LINEAR	·	1.7 km	MPC · JPL
158314	2001 VJ_{32}	—	November 9, 2001	Socorro	LINEAR	·	1.5 km	MPC · JPL
158315	2001 VX_{32}	—	November 9, 2001	Socorro	LINEAR	NYS	1.8 km	MPC · JPL
158316	2001 VW_{33}	—	November 9, 2001	Socorro	LINEAR	·	2.7 km	MPC · JPL
158317	2001 VP_{37}	—	November 9, 2001	Socorro	LINEAR	·	2.2 km	MPC · JPL
158318	2001 VH_{46}	—	November 9, 2001	Socorro	LINEAR	·	4.0 km	MPC · JPL
158319	2001 VM_{77}	—	November 12, 2001	Haleakala	NEAT	·	2.4 km	MPC · JPL
158320	2001 VW_{78}	—	November 12, 2001	Socorro	LINEAR	·	1.4 km	MPC · JPL
158321	2001 VH_{85}	—	November 12, 2001	Socorro	LINEAR	·	1.8 km	MPC · JPL
158322	2001 VY_{89}	—	November 15, 2001	Socorro	LINEAR	·	1.2 km	MPC · JPL
158323	2001 VB_{95}	—	November 15, 2001	Socorro	LINEAR	PHO	2.4 km	MPC · JPL
158324	2001 VU_{103}	—	November 12, 2001	Socorro	LINEAR	·	2.1 km	MPC · JPL
158325	2001 VO_{105}	—	November 12, 2001	Socorro	LINEAR	·	1.7 km	MPC · JPL
158326	2001 VO_{115}	—	November 12, 2001	Socorro	LINEAR	KOR	2.4 km	MPC · JPL
158327	2001 VL_{117}	—	November 12, 2001	Socorro	LINEAR	·	2.6 km	MPC · JPL
158328	2001 VR_{117}	—	November 12, 2001	Socorro	LINEAR	·	2.4 km	MPC · JPL
158329 Stevekent	2001 VJ_{127}	Stevekent	November 11, 2001	Apache Point	SDSS	·	1 km	MPC · JPL
158330	2001 WK_{2}	—	November 18, 2001	Emerald Lane	L. Ball	·	4.2 km	MPC · JPL
158331	2001 WF_{5}	—	November 20, 2001	Socorro	LINEAR	slow	1.2 km	MPC · JPL
158332	2001 WZ_{14}	—	November 17, 2001	Socorro	LINEAR	·	1.5 km	MPC · JPL
158333	2001 WW_{25}	—	November 17, 2001	Socorro	LINEAR	L5	10 km	MPC · JPL
158334	2001 WA_{28}	—	November 17, 2001	Socorro	LINEAR	NYS	1.5 km	MPC · JPL
158335	2001 WM_{34}	—	November 17, 2001	Socorro	LINEAR	·	2.1 km	MPC · JPL
158336	2001 WM_{69}	—	November 20, 2001	Socorro	LINEAR	L5	10 km	MPC · JPL
158337	2001 WD_{70}	—	November 20, 2001	Socorro	LINEAR	·	1.1 km	MPC · JPL
158338	2001 WY_{83}	—	November 20, 2001	Socorro	LINEAR	·	1.9 km	MPC · JPL
158339	2001 WX_{100}	—	November 16, 2001	Kitt Peak	Spacewatch	·	850 m	MPC · JPL
158340	2001 XH_{21}	—	December 9, 2001	Socorro	LINEAR	·	3.9 km	MPC · JPL
158341	2001 XT_{28}	—	December 11, 2001	Socorro	LINEAR	(5)	1.6 km	MPC · JPL
158342	2001 XA_{37}	—	December 9, 2001	Socorro	LINEAR	·	3.5 km	MPC · JPL
158343	2001 XX_{48}	—	December 14, 2001	Socorro	LINEAR	·	2.1 km	MPC · JPL
158344	2001 XY_{64}	—	December 10, 2001	Socorro	LINEAR	NYS	1.8 km	MPC · JPL
158345	2001 XE_{67}	—	December 10, 2001	Socorro	LINEAR	·	4.0 km	MPC · JPL
158346	2001 XQ_{67}	—	December 10, 2001	Socorro	LINEAR	·	2.0 km	MPC · JPL
158347	2001 XG_{69}	—	December 11, 2001	Socorro	LINEAR	·	2.9 km	MPC · JPL
158348	2001 XC_{83}	—	December 11, 2001	Socorro	LINEAR	·	1.4 km	MPC · JPL
158349	2001 XL_{89}	—	December 10, 2001	Socorro	LINEAR	·	1.2 km	MPC · JPL
158350	2001 XJ_{98}	—	December 10, 2001	Socorro	LINEAR	NYS	2.1 km	MPC · JPL
158351	2001 XW_{106}	—	December 10, 2001	Socorro	LINEAR	KOR	2.5 km	MPC · JPL
158352	2001 XR_{107}	—	December 10, 2001	Socorro	LINEAR	·	3.5 km	MPC · JPL
158353	2001 XQ_{112}	—	December 11, 2001	Socorro	LINEAR	·	1.8 km	MPC · JPL
158354	2001 XU_{112}	—	December 11, 2001	Socorro	LINEAR	(5)	1.8 km	MPC · JPL
158355	2001 XX_{115}	—	December 13, 2001	Socorro	LINEAR	·	4.0 km	MPC · JPL
158356	2001 XS_{118}	—	December 13, 2001	Socorro	LINEAR	·	3.1 km	MPC · JPL
158357	2001 XF_{124}	—	December 14, 2001	Socorro	LINEAR	MAS	1.0 km	MPC · JPL
158358	2001 XN_{127}	—	December 14, 2001	Socorro	LINEAR	GEF	2.3 km	MPC · JPL
158359	2001 XC_{139}	—	December 14, 2001	Socorro	LINEAR	NYS	1.6 km	MPC · JPL
158360	2001 XW_{139}	—	December 14, 2001	Socorro	LINEAR	·	1.9 km	MPC · JPL
158361	2001 XH_{140}	—	December 14, 2001	Socorro	LINEAR	·	2.0 km	MPC · JPL
158362	2001 XW_{140}	—	December 14, 2001	Socorro	LINEAR	·	1.4 km	MPC · JPL
158363	2001 XU_{144}	—	December 14, 2001	Socorro	LINEAR	(2076)	1.5 km	MPC · JPL
158364	2001 XN_{149}	—	December 14, 2001	Socorro	LINEAR	·	2.0 km	MPC · JPL
158365	2001 XV_{149}	—	December 14, 2001	Socorro	LINEAR	V	1.5 km	MPC · JPL
158366	2001 XX_{151}	—	December 14, 2001	Socorro	LINEAR	EOS	3.2 km	MPC · JPL
158367	2001 XH_{159}	—	December 14, 2001	Socorro	LINEAR	·	2.2 km	MPC · JPL
158368	2001 XM_{161}	—	December 14, 2001	Socorro	LINEAR	·	2.1 km	MPC · JPL
158369	2001 XJ_{163}	—	December 14, 2001	Socorro	LINEAR	·	3.5 km	MPC · JPL
158370	2001 XE_{166}	—	December 14, 2001	Socorro	LINEAR	V	1.2 km	MPC · JPL
158371	2001 XJ_{166}	—	December 14, 2001	Socorro	LINEAR	·	1.8 km	MPC · JPL
158372	2001 XX_{185}	—	December 14, 2001	Socorro	LINEAR	·	2.3 km	MPC · JPL
158373	2001 XJ_{188}	—	December 14, 2001	Socorro	LINEAR	·	1.7 km	MPC · JPL
158374	2001 XW_{195}	—	December 14, 2001	Socorro	LINEAR	·	3.7 km	MPC · JPL
158375	2001 XA_{198}	—	December 14, 2001	Socorro	LINEAR	EUN	1.6 km	MPC · JPL
158376	2001 XY_{202}	—	December 11, 2001	Socorro	LINEAR	·	2.1 km	MPC · JPL
158377	2001 XZ_{202}	—	December 11, 2001	Socorro	LINEAR	·	3.8 km	MPC · JPL
158378	2001 XN_{203}	—	December 11, 2001	Socorro	LINEAR	·	3.1 km	MPC · JPL
158379	2001 XW_{204}	—	December 11, 2001	Socorro	LINEAR	·	3.7 km	MPC · JPL
158380	2001 XP_{208}	—	December 11, 2001	Socorro	LINEAR	EUN	2.5 km	MPC · JPL
158381	2001 XQ_{210}	—	December 11, 2001	Socorro	LINEAR	(5)	1.9 km	MPC · JPL
158382	2001 XC_{215}	—	December 13, 2001	Socorro	LINEAR	·	2.2 km	MPC · JPL
158383	2001 XC_{222}	—	December 15, 2001	Socorro	LINEAR	V	940 m	MPC · JPL
158384	2001 XV_{224}	—	December 15, 2001	Socorro	LINEAR	(5)	2.4 km	MPC · JPL
158385	2001 XV_{235}	—	December 15, 2001	Socorro	LINEAR	·	3.5 km	MPC · JPL
158386	2001 XJ_{236}	—	December 15, 2001	Socorro	LINEAR	·	2.2 km	MPC · JPL
158387	2001 XY_{250}	—	December 14, 2001	Socorro	LINEAR	·	2.2 km	MPC · JPL
158388	2001 XU_{260}	—	December 10, 2001	Socorro	LINEAR	NYS	2.2 km	MPC · JPL
158389	2001 XG_{264}	—	December 14, 2001	Palomar	NEAT	·	1.9 km	MPC · JPL
158390	2001 YV_{37}	—	December 18, 2001	Socorro	LINEAR	·	1.7 km	MPC · JPL
158391	2001 YC_{40}	—	December 18, 2001	Socorro	LINEAR	MAS	1.1 km	MPC · JPL
158392	2001 YA_{44}	—	December 18, 2001	Socorro	LINEAR	MAS	940 m	MPC · JPL
158393	2001 YD_{47}	—	December 18, 2001	Socorro	LINEAR	(5)	1.5 km	MPC · JPL
158394	2001 YA_{52}	—	December 18, 2001	Socorro	LINEAR	·	2.0 km	MPC · JPL
158395	2001 YJ_{55}	—	December 18, 2001	Socorro	LINEAR	(5)	1.9 km	MPC · JPL
158396	2001 YV_{70}	—	December 18, 2001	Socorro	LINEAR	ADE	4.1 km	MPC · JPL
158397	2001 YU_{88}	—	December 18, 2001	Socorro	LINEAR	·	2.4 km	MPC · JPL
158398	2001 YO_{105}	—	December 17, 2001	Socorro	LINEAR	·	2.0 km	MPC · JPL
158399	2001 YP_{105}	—	December 17, 2001	Socorro	LINEAR	·	1.7 km	MPC · JPL
158400	2001 YZ_{106}	—	December 17, 2001	Socorro	LINEAR	·	2.3 km	MPC · JPL

== 158401–158500 ==
back to top

Designation			Discovery			Properties		Ref
Permanent	Provisional	Named after	Date	Site	Discoverer(s)	Category	Diam.	Ref
158401	2001 YZ_{111}	—	December 18, 2001	Anderson Mesa	LONEOS	·	4.9 km	MPC · JPL
158402	2001 YL_{117}	—	December 18, 2001	Socorro	LINEAR	·	2.1 km	MPC · JPL
158403	2001 YR_{117}	—	December 18, 2001	Socorro	LINEAR	·	1.9 km	MPC · JPL
158404	2001 YA_{125}	—	December 17, 2001	Socorro	LINEAR	V	1.2 km	MPC · JPL
158405	2001 YY_{130}	—	December 17, 2001	Socorro	LINEAR	(5)	2.1 km	MPC · JPL
158406	2001 YM_{133}	—	December 18, 2001	Kitt Peak	Spacewatch	·	1.5 km	MPC · JPL
158407	2001 YQ_{161}	—	December 18, 2001	Socorro	LINEAR	HYG	4.0 km	MPC · JPL
158408	2002 AO_{12}	—	January 10, 2002	Campo Imperatore	CINEOS	EUN	2.9 km	MPC · JPL
158409	2002 AM_{33}	—	January 7, 2002	Kitt Peak	Spacewatch	·	3.5 km	MPC · JPL
158410	2002 AV_{39}	—	January 9, 2002	Socorro	LINEAR	·	1.9 km	MPC · JPL
158411	2002 AJ_{51}	—	January 9, 2002	Socorro	LINEAR	·	2.2 km	MPC · JPL
158412	2002 AN_{51}	—	January 9, 2002	Socorro	LINEAR	·	2.4 km	MPC · JPL
158413	2002 AW_{51}	—	January 9, 2002	Socorro	LINEAR	·	2.0 km	MPC · JPL
158414	2002 AX_{64}	—	January 11, 2002	Socorro	LINEAR	·	1.7 km	MPC · JPL
158415	2002 AO_{87}	—	January 9, 2002	Socorro	LINEAR	(5)	1.8 km	MPC · JPL
158416	2002 AS_{98}	—	January 8, 2002	Socorro	LINEAR	MIS	4.0 km	MPC · JPL
158417	2002 AC_{106}	—	January 9, 2002	Socorro	LINEAR	·	2.6 km	MPC · JPL
158418	2002 AC_{151}	—	January 14, 2002	Socorro	LINEAR	·	1.7 km	MPC · JPL
158419	2002 AC_{154}	—	January 14, 2002	Socorro	LINEAR	·	2.8 km	MPC · JPL
158420	2002 AU_{158}	—	January 13, 2002	Socorro	LINEAR	·	2.9 km	MPC · JPL
158421	2002 AE_{165}	—	January 13, 2002	Socorro	LINEAR	·	1.8 km	MPC · JPL
158422	2002 AW_{172}	—	January 14, 2002	Socorro	LINEAR	NYS	2.0 km	MPC · JPL
158423	2002 AS_{176}	—	January 14, 2002	Socorro	LINEAR	·	1.9 km	MPC · JPL
158424	2002 AY_{186}	—	January 8, 2002	Socorro	LINEAR	(5)	1.8 km	MPC · JPL
158425	2002 BA	—	January 16, 2002	Oaxaca	Roe, J. M.	·	2.3 km	MPC · JPL
158426	2002 BH_{10}	—	January 18, 2002	Socorro	LINEAR	·	5.0 km	MPC · JPL
158427	2002 BX_{18}	—	January 21, 2002	Socorro	LINEAR	·	2.7 km	MPC · JPL
158428	2002 BX_{20}	—	January 25, 2002	Socorro	LINEAR	HNS	2.4 km	MPC · JPL
158429	2002 BH_{26}	—	January 26, 2002	Socorro	LINEAR	BRU	5.4 km	MPC · JPL
158430	2002 CL_{1}	—	February 3, 2002	Anderson Mesa	LONEOS	·	3.9 km	MPC · JPL
158431	2002 CX_{2}	—	February 3, 2002	Palomar	NEAT	·	2.3 km	MPC · JPL
158432	2002 CJ_{13}	—	February 8, 2002	Fountain Hills	C. W. Juels, P. R. Holvorcem	·	2.3 km	MPC · JPL
158433	2002 CU_{17}	—	February 6, 2002	Socorro	LINEAR	·	2.8 km	MPC · JPL
158434	2002 CP_{18}	—	February 6, 2002	Socorro	LINEAR	·	4.1 km	MPC · JPL
158435	2002 CH_{27}	—	February 6, 2002	Socorro	LINEAR	·	2.5 km	MPC · JPL
158436	2002 CF_{47}	—	February 3, 2002	Haleakala	NEAT	·	2.4 km	MPC · JPL
158437	2002 CC_{61}	—	February 6, 2002	Socorro	LINEAR	·	2.9 km	MPC · JPL
158438	2002 CJ_{61}	—	February 6, 2002	Socorro	LINEAR	·	2.9 km	MPC · JPL
158439	2002 CN_{71}	—	February 7, 2002	Socorro	LINEAR	·	2.2 km	MPC · JPL
158440	2002 CP_{78}	—	February 7, 2002	Socorro	LINEAR	·	2.7 km	MPC · JPL
158441	2002 CY_{84}	—	February 7, 2002	Socorro	LINEAR	·	1.9 km	MPC · JPL
158442	2002 CE_{85}	—	February 7, 2002	Socorro	LINEAR	·	2.3 km	MPC · JPL
158443	2002 CR_{90}	—	February 7, 2002	Socorro	LINEAR	·	2.2 km	MPC · JPL
158444	2002 CX_{99}	—	February 7, 2002	Socorro	LINEAR	·	2.6 km	MPC · JPL
158445	2002 CJ_{100}	—	February 7, 2002	Socorro	LINEAR	·	3.6 km	MPC · JPL
158446	2002 CE_{105}	—	February 7, 2002	Socorro	LINEAR	·	3.3 km	MPC · JPL
158447	2002 CO_{108}	—	February 7, 2002	Socorro	LINEAR	·	3.4 km	MPC · JPL
158448	2002 CZ_{109}	—	February 7, 2002	Socorro	LINEAR	·	3.4 km	MPC · JPL
158449	2002 CF_{119}	—	February 7, 2002	Socorro	LINEAR	·	2.0 km	MPC · JPL
158450	2002 CO_{121}	—	February 7, 2002	Socorro	LINEAR	NYS	2.1 km	MPC · JPL
158451	2002 CP_{121}	—	February 7, 2002	Socorro	LINEAR	(5)	1.7 km	MPC · JPL
158452	2002 CF_{127}	—	February 7, 2002	Socorro	LINEAR	·	2.8 km	MPC · JPL
158453	2002 CP_{127}	—	February 7, 2002	Socorro	LINEAR	·	2.2 km	MPC · JPL
158454	2002 CP_{131}	—	February 7, 2002	Socorro	LINEAR	EUN	2.3 km	MPC · JPL
158455	2002 CS_{135}	—	February 8, 2002	Socorro	LINEAR	·	2.2 km	MPC · JPL
158456	2002 CL_{147}	—	February 10, 2002	Socorro	LINEAR	·	1.8 km	MPC · JPL
158457	2002 CK_{148}	—	February 10, 2002	Socorro	LINEAR	(5)	1.4 km	MPC · JPL
158458	2002 CA_{153}	—	February 6, 2002	Socorro	LINEAR	H	1.1 km	MPC · JPL
158459	2002 CP_{161}	—	February 8, 2002	Socorro	LINEAR	·	3.0 km	MPC · JPL
158460	2002 CZ_{186}	—	February 10, 2002	Socorro	LINEAR	·	2.4 km	MPC · JPL
158461	2002 CS_{195}	—	February 10, 2002	Socorro	LINEAR	·	2.1 km	MPC · JPL
158462	2002 CB_{207}	—	February 10, 2002	Socorro	LINEAR	·	2.2 km	MPC · JPL
158463	2002 CP_{214}	—	February 10, 2002	Socorro	LINEAR	·	2.3 km	MPC · JPL
158464	2002 CY_{214}	—	February 10, 2002	Socorro	LINEAR	·	2.7 km	MPC · JPL
158465	2002 CC_{219}	—	February 10, 2002	Socorro	LINEAR	·	2.6 km	MPC · JPL
158466	2002 CS_{224}	—	February 11, 2002	Socorro	LINEAR	·	3.3 km	MPC · JPL
158467	2002 CF_{233}	—	February 11, 2002	Socorro	LINEAR	·	1.6 km	MPC · JPL
158468	2002 CH_{247}	—	February 15, 2002	Socorro	LINEAR	·	3.2 km	MPC · JPL
158469	2002 CM_{248}	—	February 14, 2002	Palomar	NEAT	·	2.9 km	MPC · JPL
158470	2002 CK_{252}	—	February 4, 2002	Anderson Mesa	LONEOS	(5)	1.8 km	MPC · JPL
158471	2002 CF_{253}	—	February 3, 2002	Palomar	NEAT	·	1.9 km	MPC · JPL
158472 Tiffanyfinley	2002 CC_{274}	Tiffanyfinley	February 8, 2002	Kitt Peak	M. W. Buie	·	2.5 km	MPC · JPL
158473	2002 CM_{296}	—	February 10, 2002	Socorro	LINEAR	·	2.2 km	MPC · JPL
158474	2002 CK_{303}	—	February 14, 2002	Haleakala	NEAT	DOR	4.5 km	MPC · JPL
158475	2002 CW_{303}	—	February 13, 2002	Kitt Peak	Spacewatch	·	3.5 km	MPC · JPL
158476	2002 CP_{305}	—	February 3, 2002	Anderson Mesa	LONEOS	·	1.8 km	MPC · JPL
158477	2002 CT_{312}	—	February 13, 2002	Palomar	NEAT	·	1.8 km	MPC · JPL
158478	2002 DJ_{1}	—	February 18, 2002	Cima Ekar	ADAS	NEM	3.4 km	MPC · JPL
158479	2002 DJ_{8}	—	February 19, 2002	Socorro	LINEAR	EUN	2.2 km	MPC · JPL
158480	2002 DN_{8}	—	February 19, 2002	Socorro	LINEAR	·	3.2 km	MPC · JPL
158481	2002 DN_{9}	—	February 19, 2002	Socorro	LINEAR	·	4.3 km	MPC · JPL
158482	2002 DQ_{11}	—	February 20, 2002	Socorro	LINEAR	·	2.6 km	MPC · JPL
158483	2002 DQ_{13}	—	February 16, 2002	Palomar	NEAT	·	2.8 km	MPC · JPL
158484	2002 DZ_{14}	—	February 16, 2002	Palomar	NEAT	·	2.3 km	MPC · JPL
158485	2002 DZ_{16}	—	February 20, 2002	Anderson Mesa	LONEOS	·	3.2 km	MPC · JPL
158486	2002 EM_{8}	—	March 10, 2002	Cima Ekar	ADAS	(5)	1.9 km	MPC · JPL
158487	2002 EN_{8}	—	March 11, 2002	Cima Ekar	ADAS	·	4.1 km	MPC · JPL
158488	2002 ES_{13}	—	March 4, 2002	Palomar	NEAT	·	2.3 km	MPC · JPL
158489	2002 EQ_{22}	—	March 10, 2002	Haleakala	NEAT	MRX	1.9 km	MPC · JPL
158490	2002 EX_{23}	—	March 5, 2002	Kitt Peak	Spacewatch	·	2.2 km	MPC · JPL
158491	2002 ED_{27}	—	March 9, 2002	Socorro	LINEAR	·	2.8 km	MPC · JPL
158492	2002 EM_{31}	—	March 10, 2002	Socorro	LINEAR	·	3.2 km	MPC · JPL
158493	2002 EF_{32}	—	March 9, 2002	Palomar	NEAT	AGN	1.8 km	MPC · JPL
158494	2002 EX_{33}	—	March 11, 2002	Palomar	NEAT	·	2.9 km	MPC · JPL
158495	2002 EF_{39}	—	March 9, 2002	Socorro	LINEAR	ADE	5.0 km	MPC · JPL
158496	2002 EG_{43}	—	March 12, 2002	Socorro	LINEAR	·	3.0 km	MPC · JPL
158497	2002 ER_{43}	—	March 12, 2002	Socorro	LINEAR	MRX	1.8 km	MPC · JPL
158498	2002 EA_{47}	—	March 12, 2002	Palomar	NEAT	·	2.5 km	MPC · JPL
158499	2002 EJ_{48}	—	March 12, 2002	Palomar	NEAT	·	3.2 km	MPC · JPL
158500	2002 EL_{53}	—	March 13, 2002	Socorro	LINEAR	·	2.2 km	MPC · JPL

== 158501–158600 ==
back to top

Designation			Discovery			Properties		Ref
Permanent	Provisional	Named after	Date	Site	Discoverer(s)	Category	Diam.	Ref
158501	2002 EY_{56}	—	March 13, 2002	Socorro	LINEAR	·	2.8 km	MPC · JPL
158502	2002 EP_{59}	—	March 13, 2002	Socorro	LINEAR	·	2.2 km	MPC · JPL
158503	2002 EN_{60}	—	March 13, 2002	Socorro	LINEAR	AGN	1.7 km	MPC · JPL
158504	2002 EL_{66}	—	March 13, 2002	Socorro	LINEAR	·	2.7 km	MPC · JPL
158505	2002 EO_{73}	—	March 13, 2002	Socorro	LINEAR	·	3.7 km	MPC · JPL
158506	2002 EN_{78}	—	March 13, 2002	Kitt Peak	Spacewatch	(5)	1.8 km	MPC · JPL
158507	2002 EN_{93}	—	March 14, 2002	Socorro	LINEAR	·	2.4 km	MPC · JPL
158508	2002 EG_{94}	—	March 14, 2002	Socorro	LINEAR	·	2.4 km	MPC · JPL
158509	2002 EF_{96}	—	March 11, 2002	Kitt Peak	Spacewatch	·	4.2 km	MPC · JPL
158510	2002 EW_{103}	—	March 9, 2002	Anderson Mesa	LONEOS	EUN	2.1 km	MPC · JPL
158511	2002 EJ_{104}	—	March 9, 2002	Anderson Mesa	LONEOS	·	3.7 km	MPC · JPL
158512	2002 EZ_{105}	—	March 9, 2002	Anderson Mesa	LONEOS	GEF	2.1 km	MPC · JPL
158513	2002 ET_{108}	—	March 9, 2002	Kitt Peak	Spacewatch	·	2.5 km	MPC · JPL
158514	2002 EZ_{116}	—	March 9, 2002	Kitt Peak	Spacewatch	·	1.9 km	MPC · JPL
158515	2002 EU_{140}	—	March 12, 2002	Palomar	NEAT	·	2.0 km	MPC · JPL
158516	2002 EL_{142}	—	March 12, 2002	Palomar	NEAT	(5)	2.8 km	MPC · JPL
158517	2002 EN_{152}	—	March 14, 2002	Palomar	NEAT	·	3.0 km	MPC · JPL
158518	2002 EQ_{152}	—	March 14, 2002	Palomar	NEAT	·	3.4 km	MPC · JPL
158519	2002 EL_{154}	—	March 13, 2002	Socorro	LINEAR	·	2.5 km	MPC · JPL
158520 Ricardoferreira	2002 FR_{1}	Ricardoferreira	March 19, 2002	Fountain Hills	C. W. Juels, P. R. Holvorcem	·	7.0 km	MPC · JPL
158521	2002 FC_{4}	—	March 20, 2002	Desert Eagle	W. K. Y. Yeung	·	5.0 km	MPC · JPL
158522	2002 FZ_{12}	—	March 16, 2002	Socorro	LINEAR	·	3.5 km	MPC · JPL
158523	2002 FL_{24}	—	March 19, 2002	Palomar	NEAT	EUN	2.6 km	MPC · JPL
158524	2002 GV_{1}	—	April 2, 2002	Kvistaberg	Uppsala-DLR Asteroid Survey	·	4.6 km	MPC · JPL
158525	2002 GV_{15}	—	April 15, 2002	Socorro	LINEAR	·	5.0 km	MPC · JPL
158526	2002 GE_{16}	—	April 15, 2002	Socorro	LINEAR	·	3.9 km	MPC · JPL
158527	2002 GN_{23}	—	April 15, 2002	Palomar	NEAT	·	3.1 km	MPC · JPL
158528	2002 GP_{35}	—	April 2, 2002	Kitt Peak	Spacewatch	·	3.2 km	MPC · JPL
158529	2002 GQ_{35}	—	April 2, 2002	Palomar	NEAT	·	3.2 km	MPC · JPL
158530	2002 GC_{39}	—	April 4, 2002	Palomar	NEAT	GEF	1.8 km	MPC · JPL
158531	2002 GB_{52}	—	April 5, 2002	Palomar	NEAT	·	3.1 km	MPC · JPL
158532	2002 GL_{66}	—	April 8, 2002	Palomar	NEAT	·	3.0 km	MPC · JPL
158533	2002 GP_{67}	—	April 8, 2002	Kitt Peak	Spacewatch	AST	3.6 km	MPC · JPL
158534	2002 GO_{73}	—	April 9, 2002	Anderson Mesa	LONEOS	PAD	5.5 km	MPC · JPL
158535	2002 GR_{77}	—	April 9, 2002	Anderson Mesa	LONEOS	·	3.5 km	MPC · JPL
158536	2002 GF_{81}	—	April 10, 2002	Socorro	LINEAR	HOF	5.7 km	MPC · JPL
158537	2002 GP_{86}	—	April 10, 2002	Socorro	LINEAR	·	3.8 km	MPC · JPL
158538	2002 GN_{90}	—	April 8, 2002	Kitt Peak	Spacewatch	·	3.5 km	MPC · JPL
158539	2002 GH_{91}	—	April 9, 2002	Kitt Peak	Spacewatch	AGN	1.9 km	MPC · JPL
158540	2002 GH_{92}	—	April 9, 2002	Kitt Peak	Spacewatch	KOR	2.4 km	MPC · JPL
158541	2002 GL_{94}	—	April 9, 2002	Socorro	LINEAR	DOR	4.0 km	MPC · JPL
158542	2002 GH_{102}	—	April 10, 2002	Socorro	LINEAR	·	5.6 km	MPC · JPL
158543	2002 GC_{106}	—	April 11, 2002	Anderson Mesa	LONEOS	·	3.3 km	MPC · JPL
158544	2002 GV_{110}	—	April 10, 2002	Socorro	LINEAR	GEF	2.4 km	MPC · JPL
158545	2002 GV_{112}	—	April 10, 2002	Socorro	LINEAR	·	3.6 km	MPC · JPL
158546	2002 GO_{122}	—	April 10, 2002	Socorro	LINEAR	·	4.5 km	MPC · JPL
158547	2002 GW_{124}	—	April 12, 2002	Socorro	LINEAR	·	3.8 km	MPC · JPL
158548	2002 GL_{135}	—	April 12, 2002	Socorro	LINEAR	AGN	1.8 km	MPC · JPL
158549	2002 GO_{161}	—	April 13, 2002	Palomar	NEAT	·	2.7 km	MPC · JPL
158550	2002 GH_{169}	—	April 9, 2002	Socorro	LINEAR	·	2.9 km	MPC · JPL
158551	2002 GQ_{172}	—	April 10, 2002	Socorro	LINEAR	·	3.0 km	MPC · JPL
158552	2002 HR_{6}	—	April 18, 2002	Palomar	NEAT	GEF	2.2 km	MPC · JPL
158553	2002 JS_{1}	—	May 4, 2002	Desert Eagle	W. K. Y. Yeung	slow	3.6 km	MPC · JPL
158554	2002 JH_{22}	—	May 8, 2002	Socorro	LINEAR	·	4.4 km	MPC · JPL
158555	2002 JR_{23}	—	May 8, 2002	Socorro	LINEAR	·	4.0 km	MPC · JPL
158556	2002 JT_{37}	—	May 8, 2002	Haleakala	NEAT	·	3.7 km	MPC · JPL
158557	2002 JQ_{52}	—	May 9, 2002	Socorro	LINEAR	·	4.7 km	MPC · JPL
158558	2002 JV_{67}	—	May 9, 2002	Socorro	LINEAR	H	960 m	MPC · JPL
158559	2002 JW_{71}	—	May 8, 2002	Socorro	LINEAR	·	3.1 km	MPC · JPL
158560	2002 JF_{75}	—	May 9, 2002	Socorro	LINEAR	·	4.9 km	MPC · JPL
158561	2002 JJ_{75}	—	May 9, 2002	Socorro	LINEAR	·	6.6 km	MPC · JPL
158562	2002 JJ_{76}	—	May 11, 2002	Socorro	LINEAR	·	3.6 km	MPC · JPL
158563	2002 JM_{88}	—	May 11, 2002	Socorro	LINEAR	·	5.6 km	MPC · JPL
158564	2002 JW_{89}	—	May 11, 2002	Socorro	LINEAR	·	3.0 km	MPC · JPL
158565	2002 JR_{93}	—	May 11, 2002	Socorro	LINEAR	JUN	1.5 km	MPC · JPL
158566	2002 JN_{96}	—	May 11, 2002	Socorro	LINEAR	·	6.3 km	MPC · JPL
158567	2002 JE_{99}	—	May 13, 2002	Palomar	NEAT	·	3.6 km	MPC · JPL
158568	2002 JV_{100}	—	May 7, 2002	Palomar	NEAT	·	5.9 km	MPC · JPL
158569	2002 JT_{101}	—	May 9, 2002	Socorro	LINEAR	T_{j} (2.94)	7.3 km	MPC · JPL
158570	2002 JJ_{103}	—	May 10, 2002	Socorro	LINEAR	·	3.7 km	MPC · JPL
158571	2002 JQ_{107}	—	May 13, 2002	Palomar	NEAT	BRA	2.0 km	MPC · JPL
158572	2002 JF_{114}	—	May 6, 2002	Socorro	LINEAR	T_{j} (2.98) · EUP	7.8 km	MPC · JPL
158573	2002 JU_{117}	—	May 4, 2002	Anderson Mesa	LONEOS	·	4.8 km	MPC · JPL
158574	2002 JX_{118}	—	May 5, 2002	Palomar	NEAT	·	4.3 km	MPC · JPL
158575	2002 JM_{119}	—	May 5, 2002	Palomar	NEAT	·	4.9 km	MPC · JPL
158576	2002 JK_{135}	—	May 9, 2002	Socorro	LINEAR	·	6.3 km	MPC · JPL
158577	2002 JV_{143}	—	May 13, 2002	Palomar	NEAT	·	3.8 km	MPC · JPL
158578	2002 KQ	—	May 16, 2002	Socorro	LINEAR	·	7.0 km	MPC · JPL
158579	2002 KT_{12}	—	May 17, 2002	Kitt Peak	Spacewatch	·	7.2 km	MPC · JPL
158580	2002 LG_{1}	—	June 2, 2002	Palomar	NEAT	·	4.8 km	MPC · JPL
158581	2002 LK_{3}	—	June 3, 2002	Palomar	NEAT	·	10 km	MPC · JPL
158582	2002 LF_{10}	—	June 5, 2002	Socorro	LINEAR	·	4.8 km	MPC · JPL
158583	2002 LJ_{19}	—	June 6, 2002	Socorro	LINEAR	·	3.9 km	MPC · JPL
158584	2002 LB_{28}	—	June 9, 2002	Socorro	LINEAR	EOS	4.1 km	MPC · JPL
158585	2002 LW_{29}	—	June 9, 2002	Haleakala	NEAT	EOS	3.9 km	MPC · JPL
158586	2002 LC_{54}	—	June 10, 2002	Socorro	LINEAR	·	6.9 km	MPC · JPL
158587	2002 LG_{55}	—	June 11, 2002	Kitt Peak	Spacewatch	EOS	2.9 km	MPC · JPL
158588	2002 MY_{2}	—	June 22, 2002	Palomar	NEAT	TIR	5.1 km	MPC · JPL
158589 Snodgrass	2002 MQ_{4}	Snodgrass	June 23, 2002	La Palma	A. Fitzsimmons, Collander-Brown, S.	·	4.2 km	MPC · JPL
158590	2002 NC	—	July 1, 2002	Palomar	NEAT	HYG	6.1 km	MPC · JPL
158591	2002 NV_{2}	—	July 8, 2002	Palomar	NEAT	·	5.2 km	MPC · JPL
158592	2002 NG_{5}	—	July 10, 2002	Campo Imperatore	CINEOS	·	3.9 km	MPC · JPL
158593	2002 NA_{51}	—	July 15, 2002	Palomar	NEAT	(1298)	5.9 km	MPC · JPL
158594	2002 PB_{37}	—	August 1, 2002	Socorro	LINEAR	·	6.6 km	MPC · JPL
158595	2002 PH_{94}	—	August 11, 2002	Haleakala	NEAT	T_{j} (2.98) · HIL · 3:2	9.3 km	MPC · JPL
158596	2002 PA_{128}	—	August 14, 2002	Socorro	LINEAR	SYL · CYB	7.5 km	MPC · JPL
158597	2002 QR_{42}	—	August 30, 2002	Palomar	NEAT	·	3.8 km	MPC · JPL
158598	2002 RW_{26}	—	September 5, 2002	Anderson Mesa	LONEOS	H	930 m	MPC · JPL
158599	2002 TW_{65}	—	October 3, 2002	Socorro	LINEAR	·	950 m	MPC · JPL
158600	2002 VY_{33}	—	November 5, 2002	Socorro	LINEAR	·	1.1 km	MPC · JPL

== 158601–158700 ==
back to top

Designation			Discovery			Properties		Ref
Permanent	Provisional	Named after	Date	Site	Discoverer(s)	Category	Diam.	Ref
158601	2002 VR_{121}	—	November 13, 2002	Socorro	LINEAR	L5	16 km	MPC · JPL
158602	2002 XB_{28}	—	December 5, 2002	Socorro	LINEAR	·	3.0 km	MPC · JPL
158603	2002 XS_{43}	—	December 6, 2002	Socorro	LINEAR	V	820 m	MPC · JPL
158604	2002 XD_{76}	—	December 11, 2002	Socorro	LINEAR	·	1.1 km	MPC · JPL
158605	2002 XZ_{79}	—	December 11, 2002	Socorro	LINEAR	·	1.7 km	MPC · JPL
158606	2002 XS_{80}	—	December 11, 2002	Socorro	LINEAR	·	1.1 km	MPC · JPL
158607	2002 YO_{6}	—	December 28, 2002	Anderson Mesa	LONEOS	·	3.9 km	MPC · JPL
158608	2002 YO_{13}	—	December 31, 2002	Socorro	LINEAR	·	3.8 km	MPC · JPL
158609	2003 AT_{27}	—	January 4, 2003	Socorro	LINEAR	·	1.5 km	MPC · JPL
158610	2003 AB_{29}	—	January 4, 2003	Socorro	LINEAR	·	2.3 km	MPC · JPL
158611	2003 AY_{35}	—	January 7, 2003	Socorro	LINEAR	·	1.8 km	MPC · JPL
158612	2003 AR_{48}	—	January 5, 2003	Socorro	LINEAR	·	1.0 km	MPC · JPL
158613	2003 AS_{49}	—	January 5, 2003	Socorro	LINEAR	·	1.7 km	MPC · JPL
158614	2003 AT_{49}	—	January 5, 2003	Socorro	LINEAR	·	2.1 km	MPC · JPL
158615	2003 AT_{53}	—	January 5, 2003	Socorro	LINEAR	·	1.8 km	MPC · JPL
158616	2003 AU_{55}	—	January 5, 2003	Socorro	LINEAR	·	1.4 km	MPC · JPL
158617	2003 AY_{55}	—	January 5, 2003	Socorro	LINEAR	·	1.2 km	MPC · JPL
158618	2003 AH_{74}	—	January 10, 2003	Socorro	LINEAR	·	1.2 km	MPC · JPL
158619	2003 AD_{80}	—	January 12, 2003	Kitt Peak	Spacewatch	V	1.1 km	MPC · JPL
158620	2003 AU_{82}	—	January 7, 2003	Bergisch Gladbach	W. Bickel	·	1.5 km	MPC · JPL
158621	2003 BJ	—	January 20, 2003	Wrightwood	J. W. Young	·	1.4 km	MPC · JPL
158622	2003 BN_{2}	—	January 26, 2003	Kitt Peak	Spacewatch	·	1.6 km	MPC · JPL
158623 Perali	2003 BS_{4}	Perali	January 24, 2003	La Silla	A. Boattini, H. Scholl	V	980 m	MPC · JPL
158624	2003 BD_{6}	—	January 23, 2003	Kvistaberg	Uppsala-DLR Asteroid Survey	·	2.6 km	MPC · JPL
158625	2003 BN_{8}	—	January 26, 2003	Anderson Mesa	LONEOS	ERI	3.5 km	MPC · JPL
158626	2003 BO_{11}	—	January 26, 2003	Anderson Mesa	LONEOS	·	1.6 km	MPC · JPL
158627	2003 BB_{23}	—	January 25, 2003	Palomar	NEAT	·	2.5 km	MPC · JPL
158628	2003 BP_{26}	—	January 26, 2003	Anderson Mesa	LONEOS	·	3.1 km	MPC · JPL
158629	2003 BQ_{30}	—	January 27, 2003	Socorro	LINEAR	NYS	1.6 km	MPC · JPL
158630	2003 BJ_{31}	—	January 27, 2003	Socorro	LINEAR	·	1.8 km	MPC · JPL
158631	2003 BM_{34}	—	January 26, 2003	Haleakala	NEAT	·	1.3 km	MPC · JPL
158632	2003 BF_{42}	—	January 27, 2003	Palomar	NEAT	·	1.5 km	MPC · JPL
158633	2003 BO_{43}	—	January 27, 2003	Socorro	LINEAR	·	1.5 km	MPC · JPL
158634	2003 BZ_{45}	—	January 30, 2003	Kitt Peak	Spacewatch	V	1.3 km	MPC · JPL
158635	2003 BU_{71}	—	January 28, 2003	Socorro	LINEAR	·	1.7 km	MPC · JPL
158636	2003 BY_{71}	—	January 28, 2003	Socorro	LINEAR	·	1.5 km	MPC · JPL
158637	2003 BH_{75}	—	January 29, 2003	Palomar	NEAT	·	1.6 km	MPC · JPL
158638	2003 BD_{79}	—	January 31, 2003	Anderson Mesa	LONEOS	·	1.7 km	MPC · JPL
158639	2003 BZ_{82}	—	January 31, 2003	Socorro	LINEAR	·	2.4 km	MPC · JPL
158640	2003 BW_{89}	—	January 28, 2003	Socorro	LINEAR	·	1.4 km	MPC · JPL
158641	2003 BR_{90}	—	January 31, 2003	Anderson Mesa	LONEOS	·	1.2 km	MPC · JPL
158642	2003 CM_{2}	—	February 1, 2003	Haleakala	NEAT	·	1.4 km	MPC · JPL
158643	2003 CG_{5}	—	February 1, 2003	Socorro	LINEAR	·	1.1 km	MPC · JPL
158644	2003 CO_{5}	—	February 1, 2003	Socorro	LINEAR	·	1.1 km	MPC · JPL
158645	2003 CE_{13}	—	February 3, 2003	Anderson Mesa	LONEOS	NYS	1.5 km	MPC · JPL
158646	2003 CL_{20}	—	February 9, 2003	Palomar	NEAT	·	1.3 km	MPC · JPL
158647	2003 DL_{2}	—	February 22, 2003	Desert Eagle	W. K. Y. Yeung	·	1.9 km	MPC · JPL
158648	2003 DA_{8}	—	February 22, 2003	Palomar	NEAT	·	2.0 km	MPC · JPL
158649	2003 DE_{10}	—	February 22, 2003	Palomar	NEAT	NYS	1.5 km	MPC · JPL
158650	2003 DF_{10}	—	February 22, 2003	Palomar	NEAT	NYS	1.7 km	MPC · JPL
158651	2003 DP_{12}	—	February 26, 2003	Campo Imperatore	CINEOS	NYS	1.8 km	MPC · JPL
158652	2003 DW_{14}	—	February 25, 2003	Campo Imperatore	CINEOS	NYS	1.7 km	MPC · JPL
158653	2003 DP_{15}	—	February 26, 2003	Campo Imperatore	CINEOS	V	1.2 km	MPC · JPL
158654	2003 DE_{24}	—	February 23, 2003	Anderson Mesa	LONEOS	·	2.2 km	MPC · JPL
158655	2003 DF_{24}	—	February 23, 2003	Anderson Mesa	LONEOS	·	1.9 km	MPC · JPL
158656	2003 DH_{24}	—	February 28, 2003	Socorro	LINEAR	V	860 m	MPC · JPL
158657 Célian	2003 EF	Célian	March 4, 2003	Saint-Véran	St. Veran	NYS	1.5 km	MPC · JPL
158658	2003 EV	—	March 5, 2003	Socorro	LINEAR	·	1.4 km	MPC · JPL
158659	2003 EJ_{19}	—	March 6, 2003	Anderson Mesa	LONEOS	NYS	1.4 km	MPC · JPL
158660	2003 EE_{23}	—	March 6, 2003	Socorro	LINEAR	·	1.3 km	MPC · JPL
158661	2003 EK_{25}	—	March 6, 2003	Anderson Mesa	LONEOS	·	2.6 km	MPC · JPL
158662	2003 EP_{25}	—	March 6, 2003	Anderson Mesa	LONEOS	·	2.3 km	MPC · JPL
158663	2003 EF_{27}	—	March 6, 2003	Anderson Mesa	LONEOS	·	1.2 km	MPC · JPL
158664	2003 EJ_{28}	—	March 6, 2003	Socorro	LINEAR	·	2.5 km	MPC · JPL
158665	2003 EV_{30}	—	March 6, 2003	Palomar	NEAT	MAS	1.2 km	MPC · JPL
158666	2003 EL_{32}	—	March 7, 2003	Anderson Mesa	LONEOS	NYS	1.4 km	MPC · JPL
158667	2003 ET_{32}	—	March 7, 2003	Anderson Mesa	LONEOS	NYS	1.6 km	MPC · JPL
158668	2003 EU_{41}	—	March 6, 2003	Palomar	NEAT	·	2.2 km	MPC · JPL
158669	2003 EA_{47}	—	March 8, 2003	Anderson Mesa	LONEOS	·	2.5 km	MPC · JPL
158670	2003 EL_{50}	—	March 10, 2003	Campo Imperatore	CINEOS	·	2.2 km	MPC · JPL
158671	2003 EU_{59}	—	March 13, 2003	Socorro	LINEAR	PHO	1.4 km	MPC · JPL
158672	2003 ED_{62}	—	March 9, 2003	Anderson Mesa	LONEOS	PHO	1.7 km	MPC · JPL
158673	2003 FO_{5}	—	March 26, 2003	Campo Imperatore	CINEOS	·	1.6 km	MPC · JPL
158674	2003 FH_{6}	—	March 27, 2003	Campo Imperatore	CINEOS	V	1.3 km	MPC · JPL
158675	2003 FZ_{9}	—	March 22, 2003	Haleakala	NEAT	MAS	1.1 km	MPC · JPL
158676	2003 FY_{16}	—	March 24, 2003	Kitt Peak	Spacewatch	NYS	2.2 km	MPC · JPL
158677	2003 FT_{27}	—	March 24, 2003	Kitt Peak	Spacewatch	V	1.1 km	MPC · JPL
158678	2003 FV_{27}	—	March 24, 2003	Kitt Peak	Spacewatch	·	1.2 km	MPC · JPL
158679	2003 FK_{29}	—	March 25, 2003	Palomar	NEAT	·	1.3 km	MPC · JPL
158680	2003 FS_{34}	—	March 23, 2003	Kitt Peak	Spacewatch	·	2.7 km	MPC · JPL
158681	2003 FK_{40}	—	March 24, 2003	Kitt Peak	Spacewatch	NYS	1.7 km	MPC · JPL
158682	2003 FK_{41}	—	March 25, 2003	Palomar	NEAT	·	1.6 km	MPC · JPL
158683	2003 FA_{43}	—	March 23, 2003	Catalina	CSS	·	1.5 km	MPC · JPL
158684	2003 FD_{47}	—	March 24, 2003	Kitt Peak	Spacewatch	·	2.1 km	MPC · JPL
158685	2003 FM_{47}	—	March 24, 2003	Kitt Peak	Spacewatch	MAS	1.0 km	MPC · JPL
158686	2003 FX_{49}	—	March 24, 2003	Haleakala	NEAT	·	2.4 km	MPC · JPL
158687	2003 FW_{51}	—	March 25, 2003	Haleakala	NEAT	NYS	1.8 km	MPC · JPL
158688	2003 FZ_{54}	—	March 25, 2003	Haleakala	NEAT	·	3.2 km	MPC · JPL
158689	2003 FK_{62}	—	March 26, 2003	Palomar	NEAT	·	1.7 km	MPC · JPL
158690	2003 FU_{63}	—	March 26, 2003	Palomar	NEAT	MAS	800 m	MPC · JPL
158691	2003 FV_{64}	—	March 26, 2003	Palomar	NEAT	NYS	1.8 km	MPC · JPL
158692	2003 FS_{65}	—	March 26, 2003	Kitt Peak	Spacewatch	SUL	3.6 km	MPC · JPL
158693	2003 FM_{69}	—	March 26, 2003	Palomar	NEAT	·	2.2 km	MPC · JPL
158694	2003 FW_{77}	—	March 27, 2003	Palomar	NEAT	NYS	1.8 km	MPC · JPL
158695	2003 FK_{80}	—	March 27, 2003	Socorro	LINEAR	·	2.2 km	MPC · JPL
158696	2003 FV_{82}	—	March 27, 2003	Palomar	NEAT	V	1.3 km	MPC · JPL
158697	2003 FG_{83}	—	March 27, 2003	Palomar	NEAT	·	4.0 km	MPC · JPL
158698	2003 FL_{92}	—	March 29, 2003	Anderson Mesa	LONEOS	·	1.7 km	MPC · JPL
158699	2003 FA_{101}	—	March 31, 2003	Anderson Mesa	LONEOS	·	2.4 km	MPC · JPL
158700	2003 FR_{108}	—	March 31, 2003	Anderson Mesa	LONEOS	·	3.6 km	MPC · JPL

== 158701–158800 ==
back to top

Designation			Discovery			Properties		Ref
Permanent	Provisional	Named after	Date	Site	Discoverer(s)	Category	Diam.	Ref
158701	2003 FU_{108}	—	March 31, 2003	Socorro	LINEAR	·	2.0 km	MPC · JPL
158702	2003 FP_{121}	—	March 25, 2003	Anderson Mesa	LONEOS	·	3.5 km	MPC · JPL
158703	2003 FX_{130}	—	March 31, 2003	Anderson Mesa	LONEOS	·	2.2 km	MPC · JPL
158704	2003 FK_{131}	—	March 25, 2003	Anderson Mesa	LONEOS	fast	3.1 km	MPC · JPL
158705	2003 GO_{3}	—	April 1, 2003	Socorro	LINEAR	·	2.1 km	MPC · JPL
158706	2003 GL_{7}	—	April 1, 2003	Socorro	LINEAR	NYS	1.5 km	MPC · JPL
158707	2003 GQ_{7}	—	April 1, 2003	Socorro	LINEAR	·	1.8 km	MPC · JPL
158708	2003 GY_{7}	—	April 3, 2003	Anderson Mesa	LONEOS	NYS	2.1 km	MPC · JPL
158709	2003 GJ_{12}	—	April 1, 2003	Socorro	LINEAR	NYS	1.4 km	MPC · JPL
158710	2003 GA_{19}	—	April 4, 2003	Kitt Peak	Spacewatch	·	1.7 km	MPC · JPL
158711	2003 GB_{27}	—	April 5, 2003	Haleakala	NEAT	·	1.9 km	MPC · JPL
158712	2003 GZ_{42}	—	April 9, 2003	Palomar	NEAT	PHO	3.5 km	MPC · JPL
158713	2003 HC_{5}	—	April 24, 2003	Anderson Mesa	LONEOS	·	2.8 km	MPC · JPL
158714	2003 HO_{12}	—	April 23, 2003	Campo Imperatore	CINEOS	·	1.3 km	MPC · JPL
158715	2003 HR_{21}	—	April 26, 2003	Haleakala	NEAT	·	1.9 km	MPC · JPL
158716	2003 HS_{22}	—	April 25, 2003	Socorro	LINEAR	·	2.4 km	MPC · JPL
158717	2003 HP_{45}	—	April 30, 2003	Socorro	LINEAR	·	1.9 km	MPC · JPL
158718	2003 HW_{45}	—	April 27, 2003	Anderson Mesa	LONEOS	·	1.6 km	MPC · JPL
158719	2003 JL_{7}	—	May 2, 2003	Kitt Peak	Spacewatch	·	1.8 km	MPC · JPL
158720	2003 JF_{17}	—	May 8, 2003	Socorro	LINEAR	·	3.3 km	MPC · JPL
158721	2003 KN_{10}	—	May 25, 2003	Kitt Peak	Spacewatch	·	2.3 km	MPC · JPL
158722	2003 KC_{18}	—	May 27, 2003	Haleakala	NEAT	·	2.1 km	MPC · JPL
158723	2003 KK_{28}	—	May 21, 2003	Anderson Mesa	LONEOS	·	1.8 km	MPC · JPL
158724	2003 KX_{34}	—	May 29, 2003	Socorro	LINEAR	KON	4.6 km	MPC · JPL
158725	2003 KD_{35}	—	May 29, 2003	Kitt Peak	Spacewatch	·	6.7 km	MPC · JPL
158726	2003 LG_{2}	—	June 1, 2003	Socorro	LINEAR	·	2.9 km	MPC · JPL
158727	2003 MD	—	June 21, 2003	Socorro	LINEAR	·	4.0 km	MPC · JPL
158728	2003 ML_{1}	—	June 23, 2003	Socorro	LINEAR	·	4.0 km	MPC · JPL
158729	2003 MP_{3}	—	June 25, 2003	Socorro	LINEAR	·	4.4 km	MPC · JPL
158730	2003 MJ_{7}	—	June 29, 2003	Socorro	LINEAR	·	3.4 km	MPC · JPL
158731	2003 MS_{8}	—	June 28, 2003	Socorro	LINEAR	·	2.5 km	MPC · JPL
158732	2003 NS_{7}	—	July 9, 2003	Kitt Peak	Spacewatch	·	5.0 km	MPC · JPL
158733	2003 OS_{5}	—	July 24, 2003	Reedy Creek	J. Broughton	JUN	1.8 km	MPC · JPL
158734	2003 OP_{12}	—	July 26, 2003	Haleakala	NEAT	·	3.3 km	MPC · JPL
158735	2003 OG_{19}	—	July 30, 2003	Palomar	NEAT	·	4.4 km	MPC · JPL
158736	2003 PK_{3}	—	August 2, 2003	Haleakala	NEAT	·	4.2 km	MPC · JPL
158737	2003 PL_{3}	—	August 2, 2003	Haleakala	NEAT	·	3.2 km	MPC · JPL
158738	2003 QF_{8}	—	August 20, 2003	Palomar	NEAT	·	3.6 km	MPC · JPL
158739	2003 QY_{31}	—	August 21, 2003	Palomar	NEAT	·	2.7 km	MPC · JPL
158740	2003 QJ_{36}	—	August 22, 2003	Socorro	LINEAR	·	4.6 km	MPC · JPL
158741	2003 QA_{37}	—	August 22, 2003	Palomar	NEAT	KOR	2.4 km	MPC · JPL
158742	2003 QV_{41}	—	August 22, 2003	Socorro	LINEAR	·	2.7 km	MPC · JPL
158743	2003 QH_{43}	—	August 22, 2003	Haleakala	NEAT	·	5.8 km	MPC · JPL
158744	2003 QT_{44}	—	August 23, 2003	Socorro	LINEAR	·	4.7 km	MPC · JPL
158745	2003 QU_{49}	—	August 22, 2003	Haleakala	NEAT	·	3.1 km	MPC · JPL
158746	2003 QF_{51}	—	August 22, 2003	Palomar	NEAT	·	3.7 km	MPC · JPL
158747	2003 QF_{52}	—	August 23, 2003	Palomar	NEAT	EOS	3.2 km	MPC · JPL
158748	2003 QX_{56}	—	August 23, 2003	Socorro	LINEAR	(18466)	4.0 km	MPC · JPL
158749	2003 QW_{57}	—	August 23, 2003	Palomar	NEAT	EOS	4.3 km	MPC · JPL
158750	2003 QB_{61}	—	August 23, 2003	Socorro	LINEAR	·	3.0 km	MPC · JPL
158751	2003 QZ_{62}	—	August 23, 2003	Socorro	LINEAR	·	5.9 km	MPC · JPL
158752	2003 QV_{71}	—	August 25, 2003	Haleakala	NEAT	·	3.8 km	MPC · JPL
158753	2003 QP_{76}	—	August 24, 2003	Socorro	LINEAR	DOR	4.7 km	MPC · JPL
158754	2003 QW_{81}	—	August 23, 2003	Palomar	NEAT	·	4.6 km	MPC · JPL
158755	2003 QP_{85}	—	August 24, 2003	Socorro	LINEAR	·	4.3 km	MPC · JPL
158756	2003 QU_{87}	—	August 25, 2003	Socorro	LINEAR	KOR	2.7 km	MPC · JPL
158757	2003 QV_{87}	—	August 25, 2003	Socorro	LINEAR	·	4.0 km	MPC · JPL
158758	2003 QG_{95}	—	August 29, 2003	Haleakala	NEAT	·	6.5 km	MPC · JPL
158759	2003 QC_{96}	—	August 30, 2003	Haleakala	NEAT	EOS	4.0 km	MPC · JPL
158760	2003 QL_{101}	—	August 29, 2003	Socorro	LINEAR	·	5.4 km	MPC · JPL
158761	2003 QK_{102}	—	August 31, 2003	Kitt Peak	Spacewatch	·	5.0 km	MPC · JPL
158762	2003 RS	—	September 2, 2003	Socorro	LINEAR	URS	8.8 km	MPC · JPL
158763	2003 RO_{7}	—	September 4, 2003	Socorro	LINEAR	·	4.3 km	MPC · JPL
158764	2003 RM_{12}	—	September 14, 2003	Palomar	NEAT	·	5.3 km	MPC · JPL
158765	2003 RA_{13}	—	September 14, 2003	Haleakala	NEAT	HYG	5.5 km	MPC · JPL
158766	2003 SD_{5}	—	September 16, 2003	Kitt Peak	Spacewatch	·	7.1 km	MPC · JPL
158767	2003 SG_{5}	—	September 16, 2003	Kitt Peak	Spacewatch	·	4.0 km	MPC · JPL
158768	2003 SQ_{45}	—	September 16, 2003	Anderson Mesa	LONEOS	·	4.6 km	MPC · JPL
158769	2003 SY_{47}	—	September 18, 2003	Palomar	NEAT	·	5.9 km	MPC · JPL
158770	2003 SD_{56}	—	September 16, 2003	Anderson Mesa	LONEOS	·	4.2 km	MPC · JPL
158771	2003 SC_{58}	—	September 16, 2003	Kitt Peak	Spacewatch	·	4.2 km	MPC · JPL
158772	2003 SB_{60}	—	September 17, 2003	Anderson Mesa	LONEOS	·	3.8 km	MPC · JPL
158773	2003 SY_{60}	—	September 17, 2003	Kitt Peak	Spacewatch	·	6.0 km	MPC · JPL
158774	2003 SK_{62}	—	September 17, 2003	Kitt Peak	Spacewatch	·	5.4 km	MPC · JPL
158775	2003 SR_{64}	—	September 18, 2003	Campo Imperatore	CINEOS	·	4.2 km	MPC · JPL
158776	2003 SK_{65}	—	September 18, 2003	Anderson Mesa	LONEOS	ELF	6.2 km	MPC · JPL
158777	2003 SV_{65}	—	September 18, 2003	Socorro	LINEAR	·	3.1 km	MPC · JPL
158778	2003 SC_{67}	—	September 19, 2003	Socorro	LINEAR	·	6.6 km	MPC · JPL
158779	2003 SJ_{75}	—	September 18, 2003	Kitt Peak	Spacewatch	·	6.6 km	MPC · JPL
158780	2003 SN_{75}	—	September 18, 2003	Kitt Peak	Spacewatch	·	3.8 km	MPC · JPL
158781	2003 SO_{90}	—	September 18, 2003	Socorro	LINEAR	·	7.0 km	MPC · JPL
158782	2003 SB_{97}	—	September 19, 2003	Palomar	NEAT	URS	7.6 km	MPC · JPL
158783	2003 SO_{102}	—	September 20, 2003	Socorro	LINEAR	EOS	3.8 km	MPC · JPL
158784	2003 SB_{103}	—	September 20, 2003	Haleakala	NEAT	·	3.7 km	MPC · JPL
158785	2003 SG_{118}	—	September 16, 2003	Palomar	NEAT	·	5.8 km	MPC · JPL
158786	2003 SB_{121}	—	September 17, 2003	Socorro	LINEAR	·	5.8 km	MPC · JPL
158787	2003 SJ_{121}	—	September 17, 2003	Kitt Peak	Spacewatch	·	2.3 km	MPC · JPL
158788	2003 SK_{126}	—	September 19, 2003	Kitt Peak	Spacewatch	HYG	4.3 km	MPC · JPL
158789	2003 SB_{128}	—	September 20, 2003	Socorro	LINEAR	·	5.6 km	MPC · JPL
158790	2003 SG_{134}	—	September 18, 2003	Palomar	NEAT	EOS ·	3.2 km	MPC · JPL
158791	2003 SJ_{138}	—	September 19, 2003	Haleakala	NEAT	·	5.1 km	MPC · JPL
158792	2003 SM_{139}	—	September 18, 2003	Socorro	LINEAR	·	5.6 km	MPC · JPL
158793	2003 SF_{143}	—	September 20, 2003	Socorro	LINEAR	·	4.1 km	MPC · JPL
158794	2003 SG_{149}	—	September 16, 2003	Kitt Peak	Spacewatch	THM	6.4 km	MPC · JPL
158795	2003 SZ_{157}	—	September 21, 2003	Socorro	LINEAR	·	5.5 km	MPC · JPL
158796	2003 SQ_{162}	—	September 19, 2003	Socorro	LINEAR	EOS	3.9 km	MPC · JPL
158797	2003 SR_{164}	—	September 20, 2003	Anderson Mesa	LONEOS	·	4.7 km	MPC · JPL
158798	2003 SR_{168}	—	September 23, 2003	Haleakala	NEAT	VER	5.9 km	MPC · JPL
158799	2003 SV_{186}	—	September 22, 2003	Anderson Mesa	LONEOS	EOS	3.4 km	MPC · JPL
158800	2003 SX_{187}	—	September 22, 2003	Anderson Mesa	LONEOS	·	2.3 km	MPC · JPL

== 158801–158900 ==
back to top

Designation			Discovery			Properties		Ref
Permanent	Provisional	Named after	Date	Site	Discoverer(s)	Category	Diam.	Ref
158801	2003 SP_{199}	—	September 21, 2003	Anderson Mesa	LONEOS	·	7.6 km	MPC · JPL
158802	2003 SU_{235}	—	September 27, 2003	Socorro	LINEAR	(159)	4.4 km	MPC · JPL
158803	2003 SZ_{257}	—	September 28, 2003	Socorro	LINEAR	·	4.2 km	MPC · JPL
158804	2003 SS_{269}	—	September 28, 2003	Goodricke-Pigott	R. A. Tucker	·	6.1 km	MPC · JPL
158805	2003 SD_{274}	—	September 28, 2003	Anderson Mesa	LONEOS	·	4.6 km	MPC · JPL
158806	2003 SG_{285}	—	September 20, 2003	Socorro	LINEAR	·	4.1 km	MPC · JPL
158807	2003 SE_{311}	—	September 29, 2003	Socorro	LINEAR	·	4.8 km	MPC · JPL
158808	2003 SX_{319}	—	September 16, 2003	Kitt Peak	Spacewatch	EOS	3.0 km	MPC · JPL
158809	2003 SS_{320}	—	September 18, 2003	Kitt Peak	Spacewatch	·	2.7 km	MPC · JPL
158810	2003 TY_{9}	—	October 14, 2003	Palomar	NEAT	·	7.9 km	MPC · JPL
158811	2003 TZ_{14}	—	October 15, 2003	Anderson Mesa	LONEOS	3:2	7.9 km	MPC · JPL
158812	2003 TX_{57}	—	October 15, 2003	Anderson Mesa	LONEOS	·	5.0 km	MPC · JPL
158813	2003 UM_{18}	—	October 19, 2003	Anderson Mesa	LONEOS	·	5.0 km	MPC · JPL
158814	2003 UZ_{61}	—	October 16, 2003	Anderson Mesa	LONEOS	EOS	4.1 km	MPC · JPL
158815	2003 US_{62}	—	October 16, 2003	Anderson Mesa	LONEOS	·	5.5 km	MPC · JPL
158816	2003 UM_{90}	—	October 20, 2003	Kitt Peak	Spacewatch	·	3.4 km	MPC · JPL
158817	2003 UX_{102}	—	October 20, 2003	Kitt Peak	Spacewatch	·	4.6 km	MPC · JPL
158818	2003 UK_{125}	—	October 20, 2003	Socorro	LINEAR	·	5.5 km	MPC · JPL
158819	2003 UZ_{136}	—	October 21, 2003	Palomar	NEAT	·	4.0 km	MPC · JPL
158820	2003 UK_{151}	—	October 21, 2003	Socorro	LINEAR	·	6.2 km	MPC · JPL
158821	2003 UC_{202}	—	October 21, 2003	Socorro	LINEAR	·	6.5 km	MPC · JPL
158822	2003 UC_{218}	—	October 21, 2003	Socorro	LINEAR	·	5.6 km	MPC · JPL
158823	2003 UG_{231}	—	October 24, 2003	Socorro	LINEAR	HYG	5.2 km	MPC · JPL
158824	2003 UY_{254}	—	October 25, 2003	Socorro	LINEAR	(1118)	6.1 km	MPC · JPL
158825	2003 UZ_{256}	—	October 25, 2003	Socorro	LINEAR	·	7.0 km	MPC · JPL
158826	2003 WP_{96}	—	November 19, 2003	Anderson Mesa	LONEOS	·	2.9 km	MPC · JPL
158827	2003 WM_{146}	—	November 23, 2003	Catalina	CSS	THB	6.8 km	MPC · JPL
158828	2003 YZ_{29}	—	December 17, 2003	Palomar	NEAT	H	1.1 km	MPC · JPL
158829	2003 YB_{118}	—	December 19, 2003	Socorro	LINEAR	H	1.1 km	MPC · JPL
158830	2004 BQ_{26}	—	January 16, 2004	Palomar	NEAT	H	820 m	MPC · JPL
158831	2004 CR_{3}	—	February 10, 2004	Catalina	CSS	·	2.1 km	MPC · JPL
158832	2004 CQ_{51}	—	February 14, 2004	Palomar	NEAT	H	820 m	MPC · JPL
158833	2004 ET_{23}	—	March 15, 2004	Palomar	NEAT	H	830 m	MPC · JPL
158834	2004 EV_{35}	—	March 13, 2004	Palomar	NEAT	H	890 m	MPC · JPL
158835	2004 FX_{28}	—	March 28, 2004	Socorro	LINEAR	H ·	1.1 km	MPC · JPL
158836	2004 FD_{106}	—	March 26, 2004	Socorro	LINEAR	H	960 m	MPC · JPL
158837	2004 FE_{107}	—	March 20, 2004	Socorro	LINEAR	·	2.7 km	MPC · JPL
158838	2004 HH_{1}	—	April 17, 2004	Socorro	LINEAR	·	1.4 km	MPC · JPL
158839	2004 HC_{22}	—	April 16, 2004	Kitt Peak	Spacewatch	(1338) (FLO)	850 m	MPC · JPL
158840	2004 KS	—	May 17, 2004	Socorro	LINEAR	·	1.9 km	MPC · JPL
158841	2004 KE_{9}	—	May 18, 2004	Socorro	LINEAR	·	1.1 km	MPC · JPL
158842	2004 LF_{31}	—	June 13, 2004	Kitt Peak	Spacewatch	·	2.6 km	MPC · JPL
158843	2004 NG	—	July 8, 2004	Reedy Creek	J. Broughton	·	2.1 km	MPC · JPL
158844	2004 NK_{2}	—	July 9, 2004	Siding Spring	SSS	V	1.0 km	MPC · JPL
158845	2004 NJ_{3}	—	July 12, 2004	Palomar	NEAT	·	1.7 km	MPC · JPL
158846	2004 NY_{7}	—	July 11, 2004	Socorro	LINEAR	·	3.0 km	MPC · JPL
158847	2004 NB_{10}	—	July 9, 2004	Socorro	LINEAR	(2076)	1.4 km	MPC · JPL
158848	2004 NM_{15}	—	July 11, 2004	Socorro	LINEAR	·	1.8 km	MPC · JPL
158849	2004 NH_{17}	—	July 11, 2004	Socorro	LINEAR	·	1.7 km	MPC · JPL
158850	2004 NU_{21}	—	July 15, 2004	Socorro	LINEAR	·	1.8 km	MPC · JPL
158851	2004 NV_{23}	—	July 14, 2004	Socorro	LINEAR	·	2.7 km	MPC · JPL
158852	2004 NR_{25}	—	July 11, 2004	Socorro	LINEAR	·	1.7 km	MPC · JPL
158853	2004 NJ_{32}	—	July 15, 2004	Socorro	LINEAR	·	1.6 km	MPC · JPL
158854	2004 ON_{2}	—	July 16, 2004	Socorro	LINEAR	·	1.9 km	MPC · JPL
158855	2004 OM_{3}	—	July 16, 2004	Socorro	LINEAR	MAS	1.2 km	MPC · JPL
158856	2004 OG_{4}	—	July 17, 2004	Reedy Creek	J. Broughton	·	1.3 km	MPC · JPL
158857	2004 OD_{7}	—	July 16, 2004	Socorro	LINEAR	NYS	1.9 km	MPC · JPL
158858	2004 PT_{1}	—	August 6, 2004	Reedy Creek	J. Broughton	·	1.8 km	MPC · JPL
158859	2004 PL_{3}	—	August 3, 2004	Siding Spring	SSS	·	1.5 km	MPC · JPL
158860	2004 PY_{7}	—	August 6, 2004	Palomar	NEAT	BAP	1.4 km	MPC · JPL
158861	2004 PC_{8}	—	August 6, 2004	Palomar	NEAT	·	1.8 km	MPC · JPL
158862	2004 PK_{8}	—	August 6, 2004	Palomar	NEAT	·	2.0 km	MPC · JPL
158863	2004 PV_{9}	—	August 6, 2004	Campo Imperatore	CINEOS	·	1.8 km	MPC · JPL
158864	2004 PE_{12}	—	August 7, 2004	Palomar	NEAT	V	940 m	MPC · JPL
158865	2004 PY_{13}	—	August 7, 2004	Palomar	NEAT	·	2.0 km	MPC · JPL
158866	2004 PU_{15}	—	August 7, 2004	Palomar	NEAT	·	1.8 km	MPC · JPL
158867	2004 PV_{15}	—	August 7, 2004	Palomar	NEAT	V	1.2 km	MPC · JPL
158868	2004 PU_{17}	—	August 8, 2004	Socorro	LINEAR	·	950 m	MPC · JPL
158869	2004 PB_{19}	—	August 8, 2004	Socorro	LINEAR	·	2.3 km	MPC · JPL
158870	2004 PV_{19}	—	August 8, 2004	Anderson Mesa	LONEOS	·	1.6 km	MPC · JPL
158871	2004 PW_{19}	—	August 8, 2004	Anderson Mesa	LONEOS	·	2.1 km	MPC · JPL
158872	2004 PN_{21}	—	August 7, 2004	Palomar	NEAT	·	2.7 km	MPC · JPL
158873	2004 PQ_{22}	—	August 8, 2004	Socorro	LINEAR	·	1.5 km	MPC · JPL
158874	2004 PP_{27}	—	August 9, 2004	Reedy Creek	J. Broughton	·	1.6 km	MPC · JPL
158875	2004 PL_{28}	—	August 6, 2004	Palomar	NEAT	MAS	920 m	MPC · JPL
158876	2004 PE_{30}	—	August 8, 2004	Campo Imperatore	CINEOS	·	1.9 km	MPC · JPL
158877	2004 PA_{31}	—	August 8, 2004	Socorro	LINEAR	MAS	850 m	MPC · JPL
158878	2004 PM_{31}	—	August 8, 2004	Socorro	LINEAR	MAS	1.0 km	MPC · JPL
158879	2004 PC_{44}	—	August 7, 2004	Palomar	NEAT	CLA	2.0 km	MPC · JPL
158880	2004 PE_{45}	—	August 7, 2004	Palomar	NEAT	·	1.9 km	MPC · JPL
158881	2004 PG_{50}	—	August 8, 2004	Socorro	LINEAR	·	1.4 km	MPC · JPL
158882	2004 PY_{50}	—	August 8, 2004	Socorro	LINEAR	·	1.1 km	MPC · JPL
158883	2004 PD_{52}	—	August 8, 2004	Socorro	LINEAR	NYS	2.8 km	MPC · JPL
158884	2004 PZ_{53}	—	August 8, 2004	Socorro	LINEAR	NYS	1.8 km	MPC · JPL
158885	2004 PO_{61}	—	August 9, 2004	Socorro	LINEAR	·	1.3 km	MPC · JPL
158886	2004 PW_{67}	—	August 6, 2004	Palomar	NEAT	·	2.2 km	MPC · JPL
158887	2004 PK_{68}	—	August 6, 2004	Palomar	NEAT	·	1.6 km	MPC · JPL
158888	2004 PS_{71}	—	August 8, 2004	Socorro	LINEAR	MAS	1.1 km	MPC · JPL
158889	2004 PE_{78}	—	August 9, 2004	Socorro	LINEAR	·	1.1 km	MPC · JPL
158890	2004 PB_{80}	—	August 9, 2004	Socorro	LINEAR	·	1.2 km	MPC · JPL
158891	2004 PZ_{82}	—	August 10, 2004	Socorro	LINEAR	·	1.8 km	MPC · JPL
158892	2004 PT_{83}	—	August 10, 2004	Socorro	LINEAR	NEM	3.4 km	MPC · JPL
158893	2004 PW_{83}	—	August 10, 2004	Socorro	LINEAR	V	1.0 km	MPC · JPL
158894	2004 PT_{84}	—	August 10, 2004	Socorro	LINEAR	·	1.6 km	MPC · JPL
158895	2004 PD_{85}	—	August 10, 2004	Socorro	LINEAR	NYS	1.7 km	MPC · JPL
158896	2004 PO_{85}	—	August 10, 2004	Socorro	LINEAR	MAS	1.1 km	MPC · JPL
158897	2004 PF_{91}	—	August 11, 2004	Socorro	LINEAR	·	4.0 km	MPC · JPL
158898	2004 PX_{100}	—	August 10, 2004	Campo Imperatore	CINEOS	·	1.5 km	MPC · JPL
158899 Malloryvale	2004 QO	Malloryvale	August 17, 2004	Wrightwood	J. W. Young	·	1.8 km	MPC · JPL
158900	2004 QT_{7}	—	August 22, 2004	Bergisch Gladbach	W. Bickel	·	3.1 km	MPC · JPL

== 158901–159000 ==
back to top

Designation			Discovery			Properties		Ref
Permanent	Provisional	Named after	Date	Site	Discoverer(s)	Category	Diam.	Ref
158901	2004 QW_{8}	—	August 16, 2004	Siding Spring	SSS	·	4.1 km	MPC · JPL
158902	2004 QW_{18}	—	August 21, 2004	Catalina	CSS	·	1.7 km	MPC · JPL
158903	2004 QL_{21}	—	August 23, 2004	Kitt Peak	Spacewatch	·	1.7 km	MPC · JPL
158904	2004 RN_{3}	—	September 3, 2004	Palomar	NEAT	·	2.9 km	MPC · JPL
158905	2004 RD_{4}	—	September 4, 2004	Palomar	NEAT	V	1.1 km	MPC · JPL
158906	2004 RS_{4}	—	September 4, 2004	Palomar	NEAT	V	1.3 km	MPC · JPL
158907	2004 RW_{4}	—	September 4, 2004	Palomar	NEAT	V	1.0 km	MPC · JPL
158908	2004 RA_{5}	—	September 4, 2004	Palomar	NEAT	V	1.1 km	MPC · JPL
158909	2004 RB_{14}	—	September 6, 2004	Siding Spring	SSS	·	1.7 km	MPC · JPL
158910	2004 RY_{17}	—	September 7, 2004	Kitt Peak	Spacewatch	·	1.5 km	MPC · JPL
158911	2004 RU_{20}	—	September 7, 2004	Kitt Peak	Spacewatch	·	1.2 km	MPC · JPL
158912	2004 RY_{21}	—	September 7, 2004	Kitt Peak	Spacewatch	·	2.3 km	MPC · JPL
158913 Kreider	2004 RC_{25}	Kreider	September 9, 2004	Ottmarsheim	C. Rinner	TIR	4.6 km	MPC · JPL
158914	2004 RV_{26}	—	September 6, 2004	Palomar	NEAT	·	2.3 km	MPC · JPL
158915	2004 RX_{27}	—	September 6, 2004	Siding Spring	SSS	THM	3.4 km	MPC · JPL
158916	2004 RR_{32}	—	September 7, 2004	Socorro	LINEAR	NYS	1.4 km	MPC · JPL
158917	2004 RO_{34}	—	September 7, 2004	Socorro	LINEAR	·	1.5 km	MPC · JPL
158918	2004 RX_{35}	—	September 7, 2004	Socorro	LINEAR	AGN	2.3 km	MPC · JPL
158919	2004 RM_{36}	—	September 7, 2004	Socorro	LINEAR	slow	1.8 km	MPC · JPL
158920	2004 RM_{43}	—	September 8, 2004	Socorro	LINEAR	·	2.0 km	MPC · JPL
158921	2004 RX_{43}	—	September 8, 2004	Socorro	LINEAR	·	1.4 km	MPC · JPL
158922	2004 RL_{45}	—	September 8, 2004	Socorro	LINEAR	·	1.6 km	MPC · JPL
158923	2004 RN_{48}	—	September 8, 2004	Socorro	LINEAR	·	1.4 km	MPC · JPL
158924	2004 RJ_{50}	—	September 8, 2004	Socorro	LINEAR	·	2.0 km	MPC · JPL
158925	2004 RG_{55}	—	September 8, 2004	Socorro	LINEAR	MAS	1.1 km	MPC · JPL
158926	2004 RX_{55}	—	September 8, 2004	Socorro	LINEAR	NYS	1.8 km	MPC · JPL
158927	2004 RR_{58}	—	September 8, 2004	Socorro	LINEAR	NYS	1.7 km	MPC · JPL
158928	2004 RJ_{65}	—	September 8, 2004	Socorro	LINEAR	·	4.5 km	MPC · JPL
158929	2004 RW_{65}	—	September 8, 2004	Socorro	LINEAR	·	1.7 km	MPC · JPL
158930	2004 RY_{66}	—	September 8, 2004	Socorro	LINEAR	MAS	1.3 km	MPC · JPL
158931	2004 RB_{67}	—	September 8, 2004	Socorro	LINEAR	NYS	1.6 km	MPC · JPL
158932	2004 RE_{72}	—	September 8, 2004	Socorro	LINEAR	NYS	2.0 km	MPC · JPL
158933	2004 RM_{72}	—	September 8, 2004	Socorro	LINEAR	·	2.7 km	MPC · JPL
158934	2004 RV_{72}	—	September 8, 2004	Socorro	LINEAR	MAS	1.1 km	MPC · JPL
158935	2004 RC_{73}	—	September 8, 2004	Socorro	LINEAR	·	1.9 km	MPC · JPL
158936	2004 RA_{76}	—	September 8, 2004	Socorro	LINEAR	·	2.4 km	MPC · JPL
158937	2004 RR_{76}	—	September 8, 2004	Socorro	LINEAR	NYS	1.5 km	MPC · JPL
158938	2004 RY_{77}	—	September 8, 2004	Socorro	LINEAR	·	2.3 km	MPC · JPL
158939	2004 RO_{78}	—	September 8, 2004	Socorro	LINEAR	·	2.6 km	MPC · JPL
158940	2004 RN_{79}	—	September 8, 2004	Palomar	NEAT	AST	2.8 km	MPC · JPL
158941	2004 RX_{88}	—	September 8, 2004	Socorro	LINEAR	·	1.1 km	MPC · JPL
158942	2004 RD_{90}	—	September 8, 2004	Socorro	LINEAR	·	2.1 km	MPC · JPL
158943	2004 RH_{91}	—	September 8, 2004	Socorro	LINEAR	V	1.0 km	MPC · JPL
158944	2004 RO_{94}	—	September 8, 2004	Socorro	LINEAR	·	2.3 km	MPC · JPL
158945	2004 RO_{105}	—	September 8, 2004	Palomar	NEAT	·	4.8 km	MPC · JPL
158946	2004 RG_{106}	—	September 8, 2004	Palomar	NEAT	·	2.1 km	MPC · JPL
158947	2004 RT_{107}	—	September 9, 2004	Socorro	LINEAR	VER	5.7 km	MPC · JPL
158948	2004 RH_{109}	—	September 9, 2004	Socorro	LINEAR	NYS	1.7 km	MPC · JPL
158949	2004 RL_{127}	—	September 7, 2004	Kitt Peak	Spacewatch	·	1.6 km	MPC · JPL
158950	2004 RS_{136}	—	September 7, 2004	Kitt Peak	Spacewatch	WIT	1.8 km	MPC · JPL
158951	2004 RB_{141}	—	September 8, 2004	Socorro	LINEAR	·	2.3 km	MPC · JPL
158952	2004 RG_{148}	—	September 9, 2004	Socorro	LINEAR	HOF	3.0 km	MPC · JPL
158953	2004 RX_{150}	—	September 9, 2004	Socorro	LINEAR	·	5.2 km	MPC · JPL
158954	2004 RE_{151}	—	September 9, 2004	Socorro	LINEAR	·	1.9 km	MPC · JPL
158955	2004 RO_{152}	—	September 10, 2004	Socorro	LINEAR	·	1.8 km	MPC · JPL
158956	2004 RA_{157}	—	September 10, 2004	Socorro	LINEAR	·	2.6 km	MPC · JPL
158957	2004 RN_{167}	—	September 7, 2004	Socorro	LINEAR	·	4.2 km	MPC · JPL
158958	2004 RM_{178}	—	September 10, 2004	Socorro	LINEAR	·	1.2 km	MPC · JPL
158959	2004 RW_{197}	—	September 10, 2004	Socorro	LINEAR	·	3.7 km	MPC · JPL
158960	2004 RW_{200}	—	September 10, 2004	Socorro	LINEAR	·	3.3 km	MPC · JPL
158961	2004 RX_{201}	—	September 11, 2004	Socorro	LINEAR	·	1.2 km	MPC · JPL
158962	2004 RA_{211}	—	September 11, 2004	Socorro	LINEAR	·	5.9 km	MPC · JPL
158963	2004 RH_{216}	—	September 11, 2004	Socorro	LINEAR	T_{j} (2.99)	6.0 km	MPC · JPL
158964	2004 RR_{226}	—	September 9, 2004	Socorro	LINEAR	NYS	2.0 km	MPC · JPL
158965	2004 RF_{231}	—	September 9, 2004	Kitt Peak	Spacewatch	MIS	3.7 km	MPC · JPL
158966	2004 RE_{232}	—	September 9, 2004	Kitt Peak	Spacewatch	·	1.3 km	MPC · JPL
158967	2004 RG_{232}	—	September 9, 2004	Kitt Peak	Spacewatch	·	2.6 km	MPC · JPL
158968	2004 RA_{236}	—	September 10, 2004	Socorro	LINEAR	·	2.8 km	MPC · JPL
158969	2004 RQ_{254}	—	September 6, 2004	Palomar	NEAT	·	2.8 km	MPC · JPL
158970	2004 RW_{256}	—	September 9, 2004	Anderson Mesa	LONEOS	·	2.3 km	MPC · JPL
158971	2004 RR_{272}	—	September 11, 2004	Kitt Peak	Spacewatch	·	1.7 km	MPC · JPL
158972	2004 RW_{277}	—	September 13, 2004	Kitt Peak	Spacewatch	V	850 m	MPC · JPL
158973	2004 RP_{289}	—	September 12, 2004	Goodricke-Pigott	R. A. Tucker	·	2.9 km	MPC · JPL
158974	2004 RF_{290}	—	September 8, 2004	Socorro	LINEAR	·	1.7 km	MPC · JPL
158975	2004 RT_{290}	—	September 9, 2004	Socorro	LINEAR	·	3.0 km	MPC · JPL
158976	2004 RL_{292}	—	September 10, 2004	Socorro	LINEAR	HOF	4.7 km	MPC · JPL
158977	2004 RE_{294}	—	September 11, 2004	Kitt Peak	Spacewatch	·	1.2 km	MPC · JPL
158978	2004 RW_{300}	—	September 11, 2004	Kitt Peak	Spacewatch	AGN	1.3 km	MPC · JPL
158979	2004 RM_{301}	—	September 11, 2004	Kitt Peak	Spacewatch	·	1.1 km	MPC · JPL
158980	2004 RG_{306}	—	September 12, 2004	Socorro	LINEAR	·	3.6 km	MPC · JPL
158981	2004 RD_{307}	—	September 12, 2004	Socorro	LINEAR	JUN	2.4 km	MPC · JPL
158982	2004 RT_{311}	—	September 14, 2004	Socorro	LINEAR	HYG	3.4 km	MPC · JPL
158983	2004 RX_{311}	—	September 15, 2004	Anderson Mesa	LONEOS	·	3.8 km	MPC · JPL
158984	2004 RN_{323}	—	September 13, 2004	Socorro	LINEAR	·	1.8 km	MPC · JPL
158985	2004 RB_{330}	—	September 13, 2004	Kitt Peak	Spacewatch	·	890 m	MPC · JPL
158986	2004 RY_{330}	—	September 15, 2004	Kitt Peak	Spacewatch	AST	3.2 km	MPC · JPL
158987	2004 RC_{342}	—	September 9, 2004	Socorro	LINEAR	·	3.5 km	MPC · JPL
158988	2004 SP_{2}	—	September 17, 2004	Socorro	LINEAR	·	8.0 km	MPC · JPL
158989	2004 SJ_{10}	—	September 16, 2004	Siding Spring	SSS	·	2.2 km	MPC · JPL
158990	2004 SJ_{15}	—	September 17, 2004	Anderson Mesa	LONEOS	·	1.8 km	MPC · JPL
158991	2004 SK_{15}	—	September 17, 2004	Anderson Mesa	LONEOS	·	1.3 km	MPC · JPL
158992	2004 SA_{23}	—	September 17, 2004	Kitt Peak	Spacewatch	·	3.9 km	MPC · JPL
158993	2004 SK_{24}	—	September 17, 2004	Kitt Peak	Spacewatch	HOF	4.0 km	MPC · JPL
158994	2004 SB_{29}	—	September 17, 2004	Socorro	LINEAR	NYS	2.4 km	MPC · JPL
158995	2004 SH_{31}	—	September 17, 2004	Socorro	LINEAR	·	5.2 km	MPC · JPL
158996	2004 SF_{36}	—	September 17, 2004	Socorro	LINEAR	·	3.6 km	MPC · JPL
158997	2004 SZ_{37}	—	September 17, 2004	Socorro	LINEAR	·	2.0 km	MPC · JPL
158998	2004 SC_{39}	—	September 17, 2004	Socorro	LINEAR	·	3.3 km	MPC · JPL
158999	2004 SN_{40}	—	September 17, 2004	Socorro	LINEAR	EUN	2.3 km	MPC · JPL
159000	2004 SA_{41}	—	September 17, 2004	Socorro	LINEAR	·	2.6 km	MPC · JPL

back to top

== See also ==
- Meanings of minor-planet names: 158001–159000
