= Meanings of minor-planet names: 168001–169000 =

As minor planet discoveries are confirmed, they are given a permanent number by the IAU's Minor Planet Center (MPC), and the discoverers can then submit names for them, following the IAU's naming conventions. The list below concerns those minor planets in the specified number-range that have received names, and explains the meanings of those names.

Official naming citations of newly named small Solar System bodies are approved and published in a bulletin by IAU's Working Group for Small Bodies Nomenclature (WGSBN). Before May 2021, citations were published in MPC's Minor Planet Circulars for many decades. Recent citations can also be found on the JPL Small-Body Database (SBDB). Until his death in 2016, German astronomer Lutz D. Schmadel compiled these citations into the Dictionary of Minor Planet Names (DMP) and regularly updated the collection.

Based on Paul Herget's The Names of the Minor Planets, Schmadel also researched the unclear origin of numerous asteroids, most of which had been named prior to World War II. This article incorporates text from this source, which is in the public domain: SBDB New namings may only be added to this list below after official publication as the preannouncement of names is condemned. The WGSBN publishes a comprehensive guideline for the naming rules of non-cometary small Solar System bodies.

== 168001–168100 ==
Named minor planet	Provisional	This minor planet was named for...	Ref · Catalog
168039 Eefalcoacosta	2005 LR_{1}	Emilio Eduardo Falco Acosta (b. 1954), an Uruguayan-American astronomer.	IAU · 168039

== 168101–168200 ==
back to top

Named minor planet	Provisional	This minor planet was named for...	Ref · Catalog
168126 Chengbruce	2006 GK	Bruce C. H. Cheng (born 1936), Taiwanese ecological entrepreneur, chairman and CEO of Delta Electronics, Inc.	JPL · 168126

== 168201–168300 ==
back to top

Named minor planet	Provisional	This minor planet was named for...	Ref · Catalog
168203 Kereszturi	2006 JB_{27}	Ákos Kereszturi (b. 1972), a Hungarian geologist and amateur astronomer.	IAU · 168203
168211 Juliechapman	2006 JF_{39}	Julie Grauer Chapman (born 1964), co-facilitator with the Chapman Foundation for Caring Communities in Clayton, Missouri.	IAU · 168211
168221 Donjennings	2006 JO_{60}	Don E. Jennings (born 1948) of the NASA Goddard Spaceflight Center, served as a Co-Investigator for Surface Composition Science for the New Horizons mission to Pluto.	JPL · 168221
168234 Hsi Ching	2006 KX_{67}	Hsi Ching, or the Western Capital, is a term often used in Chinese history. It may refer to Haoking (10th century BCE to 7th century BCE), Ch'ang-an (2nd century BCE to 7th century CE), or Ta-t'ung (11th to 12th century CE).	JPL · 168234
168261 Puglia	2006 PW_{3}	Apulia (in Italian Puglia), a region at the south-eastern end of the Italian peninsula	JPL · 168261

== 168301–168400 ==
back to top

Named minor planet	Provisional	This minor planet was named for...	Ref · Catalog
168321 Josephschmidt	1991 RJ_{3}	Joseph Schmidt (1904–1942), an operatic tenor who performed in the world's top concert halls	JPL · 168321
168358 Casca	1996 DF_{2}	"Casca", the Canadian Astronomical Society (French: Société Canadienne d'Astronomie)	JPL · 168358

== 168401–168500 ==
back to top

Named minor planet	Provisional	This minor planet was named for...	Ref · Catalog
There are no named minor planets in this number range

== 168501–168600 ==
back to top

Named minor planet	Provisional	This minor planet was named for...	Ref · Catalog
168531 Joshuakammer	1999 VF_{12}	Joshua A. Kammer (born 1986) is a research scientist at the Southwest Research Institute, who served as a postdoctoral science team member for the atmospheric investigation for the New Horizons mission to Pluto.	JPL · 168531

== 168601–168700 ==
back to top

Named minor planet	Provisional	This minor planet was named for...	Ref · Catalog
168635 Davidkaufmann	2000 CU_{109}	David E. Kaufmann (born 1964), a principal analyst at the Southwest Research Institute, served as a PEPSSI Instrument Sequencer for the New Horizons mission to Pluto.	JPL · 168635
168638 Waltersiegmund	2000 CH_{149}	Walter Siegmund (born 1950) is an American engineer, the Project Engineer for the Sloan Digital Sky Survey, and a designer of the telescope and its optical fiber positioning system	JPL · 168638
168698 Robpickman	2000 GX_{140}	Robert D. Pickman (born 1945), was an engineer for IBM and also for NASA developing ground-based systems to support the space shuttle	JPL · 168698

== 168701–168800 ==
back to top

Named minor planet	Provisional	This minor planet was named for...	Ref · Catalog
168767 Kochte	2000 QZ_{244}	Mark C. Kochte (born 1962) of the Johns Hopkins University Applied Physics Laboratory, served as a mission operations analyst in support of the SWAP instrument command sequences for the New Horizons mission to Pluto.	JPL · 168767

== 168801–168900 ==
back to top

Named minor planet	Provisional	This minor planet was named for...	Ref · Catalog
There are no named minor planets in this number range

== 168901–169000 ==
back to top

Named minor planet	Provisional	This minor planet was named for...	Ref · Catalog
168948 Silvestri	2000 YX_{143}	Nicole Silvestri (born 1973) is an American astronomer with the Sloan Digital Sky Survey, known for establishing a chromospheric activity-age relation for M dwarf stars and work on SDSS close binary systems	JPL · 168948

back to top

Preceded by 167,001–168,000	Meanings of minor-planet names List of minor planets: 168,001–169,000	Succeeded by 169,001–170,000
