= List of minor planets: 168001–169000 =

The following is a partial list of minor planets, running from minor-planet number 168001 through 169000, inclusive. The primary data for this and other partial lists is based on JPL's "Small-Body Orbital Elements" and data available from the Minor Planet Center. Critical list information is also provided by the MPC, unless otherwise specified from Lowell Observatory. A detailed description of the table's columns and additional sources are given on the main page including a complete list of every page in this series, and a statistical break-up on the dynamical classification of minor planets.

Also see the summary list of all named bodies in numerical and alphabetical order, and the corresponding naming citations for the number range of this particular list. New namings may only be added to this list after official publication, as the preannouncement of names is condemned by the Working Group for Small Bodies Nomenclature of the International Astronomical Union.

Near-Earth obj.	MBA (inner)	MBA (outer)	Centaur
Mars-crosser	MBA (middle)	Jupiter trojan	Trans-Neptunian obj.
Unclassified

== 168001–168100 ==
Designation			Discovery			Properties		Ref
Permanent	Provisional	Named after	Date	Site	Discoverer(s)	Category	Diam.	Ref
168001	2005 GW_{133}	—	April 10, 2005	Kitt Peak	Spacewatch	KOR	2.4 km	MPC · JPL
168002	2005 GS_{136}	—	April 10, 2005	Kitt Peak	Spacewatch	·	4.7 km	MPC · JPL
168003	2005 GZ_{137}	—	April 11, 2005	Mount Lemmon	Mount Lemmon Survey	·	3.4 km	MPC · JPL
168004	2005 GP_{159}	—	April 12, 2005	Kitt Peak	Spacewatch	KOR	2.0 km	MPC · JPL
168005	2005 GT_{161}	—	April 13, 2005	Catalina	CSS	·	2.9 km	MPC · JPL
168006	2005 GV_{170}	—	April 12, 2005	Anderson Mesa	LONEOS	·	6.8 km	MPC · JPL
168007	2005 GE_{181}	—	April 12, 2005	Kitt Peak	Spacewatch	KOR	2.4 km	MPC · JPL
168008	2005 GZ_{181}	—	April 12, 2005	Kitt Peak	Spacewatch	·	2.4 km	MPC · JPL
168009	2005 GK_{203}	—	April 9, 2005	Mount Lemmon	Mount Lemmon Survey	·	1.4 km	MPC · JPL
168010	2005 HP	—	April 16, 2005	Kitt Peak	Spacewatch	·	2.1 km	MPC · JPL
168011	2005 HF_{1}	—	April 16, 2005	Kitt Peak	Spacewatch	KOR	2.0 km	MPC · JPL
168012	2005 HP_{1}	—	April 16, 2005	Kitt Peak	Spacewatch	·	4.0 km	MPC · JPL
168013	2005 HK_{4}	—	April 30, 2005	Reedy Creek	J. Broughton	·	3.6 km	MPC · JPL
168014	2005 HS_{4}	—	April 30, 2005	Kitt Peak	Spacewatch	·	4.3 km	MPC · JPL
168015	2005 HK_{5}	—	April 30, 2005	Campo Imperatore	CINEOS	HYG	6.1 km	MPC · JPL
168016	2005 HZ_{7}	—	April 30, 2005	Campo Imperatore	CINEOS	EOS	3.0 km	MPC · JPL
168017	2005 JK_{2}	—	May 3, 2005	Kitt Peak	Spacewatch	(5)	2.6 km	MPC · JPL
168018	2005 JG_{8}	—	May 4, 2005	Mauna Kea	Veillet, C.	·	2.5 km	MPC · JPL
168019	2005 JX_{8}	—	May 4, 2005	Mauna Kea	Veillet, C.	·	3.2 km	MPC · JPL
168020	2005 JJ_{21}	—	May 4, 2005	Siding Spring	SSS	·	3.3 km	MPC · JPL
168021	2005 JX_{23}	—	May 3, 2005	Kitt Peak	Spacewatch	·	3.2 km	MPC · JPL
168022	2005 JK_{44}	—	May 8, 2005	Anderson Mesa	LONEOS	LUT	5.9 km	MPC · JPL
168023	2005 JX_{46}	—	May 3, 2005	Kitt Peak	Spacewatch	·	4.0 km	MPC · JPL
168024	2005 JC_{77}	—	May 9, 2005	Siding Spring	SSS	HNS	2.3 km	MPC · JPL
168025	2005 JS_{84}	—	May 8, 2005	Mount Lemmon	Mount Lemmon Survey	·	3.8 km	MPC · JPL
168026	2005 JA_{89}	—	May 11, 2005	Kitt Peak	Spacewatch	(5)	2.3 km	MPC · JPL
168027	2005 JQ_{92}	—	May 11, 2005	Palomar	NEAT	·	7.7 km	MPC · JPL
168028	2005 JK_{94}	—	May 7, 2005	Kitt Peak	Spacewatch	EOS	4.3 km	MPC · JPL
168029	2005 JF_{98}	—	May 8, 2005	Kitt Peak	Spacewatch	(31811)	4.5 km	MPC · JPL
168030	2005 JQ_{100}	—	May 9, 2005	Anderson Mesa	LONEOS	·	6.0 km	MPC · JPL
168031	2005 JH_{103}	—	May 9, 2005	Kitt Peak	Spacewatch	·	6.4 km	MPC · JPL
168032	2005 JB_{105}	—	May 11, 2005	Mount Lemmon	Mount Lemmon Survey	KON	3.9 km	MPC · JPL
168033	2005 JJ_{143}	—	May 15, 2005	Mount Lemmon	Mount Lemmon Survey	L4	14 km	MPC · JPL
168034	2005 JN_{151}	—	May 4, 2005	Kitt Peak	Spacewatch	·	3.0 km	MPC · JPL
168035	2005 JV_{151}	—	May 4, 2005	Palomar	NEAT	·	3.1 km	MPC · JPL
168036	2005 JS_{156}	—	May 4, 2005	Catalina	CSS	·	5.8 km	MPC · JPL
168037	2005 JQ_{157}	—	May 4, 2005	Palomar	NEAT	·	6.2 km	MPC · JPL
168038	2005 JC_{178}	—	May 10, 2005	Mount Lemmon	Mount Lemmon Survey	KOR	2.2 km	MPC · JPL
168039 Eefalcoacosta	2005 LR_{1}	Eefalcoacosta	June 1, 2005	Mount Lemmon	Mount Lemmon Survey	CYB	7.1 km	MPC · JPL
168040	2005 LT_{51}	—	June 14, 2005	Kitt Peak	Spacewatch	EMA	6.4 km	MPC · JPL
168041	2005 MH_{18}	—	June 28, 2005	Kitt Peak	Spacewatch	VER	4.6 km	MPC · JPL
168042	2005 MN_{23}	—	June 24, 2005	Palomar	NEAT	TIR	2.6 km	MPC · JPL
168043	2005 NW_{70}	—	July 5, 2005	Palomar	NEAT	URS	6.2 km	MPC · JPL
168044	2005 SG	—	September 21, 2005	Siding Spring	SSS	ATE	540 m	MPC · JPL
168045	2005 YX_{214}	—	December 30, 2005	Catalina	CSS	H	1.2 km	MPC · JPL
168046	2006 AQ_{1}	—	January 2, 2006	Catalina	CSS	H	780 m	MPC · JPL
168047	2006 BV_{5}	—	January 22, 2006	Socorro	LINEAR	H	690 m	MPC · JPL
168048	2006 BG_{34}	—	January 21, 2006	Kitt Peak	Spacewatch	·	1.1 km	MPC · JPL
168049	2006 BH_{41}	—	January 22, 2006	Anderson Mesa	LONEOS	H	930 m	MPC · JPL
168050	2006 BD_{56}	—	January 26, 2006	Kitt Peak	Spacewatch	·	1.2 km	MPC · JPL
168051	2006 BM_{81}	—	January 23, 2006	Kitt Peak	Spacewatch	·	760 m	MPC · JPL
168052	2006 BQ_{95}	—	January 26, 2006	Kitt Peak	Spacewatch	MAS	1.1 km	MPC · JPL
168053	2006 BT_{95}	—	January 26, 2006	Kitt Peak	Spacewatch	·	900 m	MPC · JPL
168054	2006 BQ_{102}	—	January 23, 2006	Mount Lemmon	Mount Lemmon Survey	NYS	1.8 km	MPC · JPL
168055	2006 BD_{124}	—	January 26, 2006	Kitt Peak	Spacewatch	·	1.3 km	MPC · JPL
168056	2006 BD_{157}	—	January 25, 2006	Kitt Peak	Spacewatch	·	1.2 km	MPC · JPL
168057	2006 BA_{167}	—	January 26, 2006	Mount Lemmon	Mount Lemmon Survey	MAS	1.2 km	MPC · JPL
168058	2006 BL_{199}	—	January 30, 2006	Kitt Peak	Spacewatch	NYS	1.8 km	MPC · JPL
168059	2006 BW_{250}	—	January 31, 2006	Kitt Peak	Spacewatch	·	810 m	MPC · JPL
168060	2006 BM_{254}	—	January 31, 2006	Kitt Peak	Spacewatch	·	820 m	MPC · JPL
168061	2006 BJ_{256}	—	January 31, 2006	Kitt Peak	Spacewatch	·	1.3 km	MPC · JPL
168062	2006 BB_{266}	—	January 31, 2006	Kitt Peak	Spacewatch	·	2.4 km	MPC · JPL
168063	2006 BH_{266}	—	January 31, 2006	Kitt Peak	Spacewatch	HYG	4.3 km	MPC · JPL
168064	2006 BL_{266}	—	January 31, 2006	Kitt Peak	Spacewatch	·	2.0 km	MPC · JPL
168065	2006 BM_{266}	—	January 31, 2006	Kitt Peak	Spacewatch	·	1.8 km	MPC · JPL
168066	2006 BO_{269}	—	January 28, 2006	Anderson Mesa	LONEOS	·	5.0 km	MPC · JPL
168067	2006 CO_{7}	—	February 1, 2006	Mount Lemmon	Mount Lemmon Survey	·	1.5 km	MPC · JPL
168068	2006 CC_{23}	—	February 1, 2006	Kitt Peak	Spacewatch	(2076)	1.8 km	MPC · JPL
168069	2006 CT_{38}	—	February 2, 2006	Kitt Peak	Spacewatch	NYS	1.9 km	MPC · JPL
168070	2006 CK_{41}	—	February 2, 2006	Kitt Peak	Spacewatch	·	1.1 km	MPC · JPL
168071	2006 CW_{43}	—	February 2, 2006	Kitt Peak	Spacewatch	·	2.1 km	MPC · JPL
168072	2006 DU_{4}	—	February 20, 2006	Kitt Peak	Spacewatch	·	1.2 km	MPC · JPL
168073	2006 DW_{6}	—	February 20, 2006	Kitt Peak	Spacewatch	·	1.2 km	MPC · JPL
168074	2006 DL_{19}	—	February 20, 2006	Kitt Peak	Spacewatch	·	2.0 km	MPC · JPL
168075	2006 DZ_{21}	—	February 20, 2006	Kitt Peak	Spacewatch	·	1.2 km	MPC · JPL
168076	2006 DP_{22}	—	February 20, 2006	Kitt Peak	Spacewatch	·	1.4 km	MPC · JPL
168077	2006 DG_{23}	—	February 20, 2006	Kitt Peak	Spacewatch	NYS	1.5 km	MPC · JPL
168078	2006 DX_{27}	—	February 20, 2006	Kitt Peak	Spacewatch	·	2.7 km	MPC · JPL
168079	2006 DE_{46}	—	February 20, 2006	Kitt Peak	Spacewatch	MAS	980 m	MPC · JPL
168080	2006 DR_{58}	—	February 24, 2006	Kitt Peak	Spacewatch	·	1.1 km	MPC · JPL
168081	2006 DB_{59}	—	February 24, 2006	Mount Lemmon	Mount Lemmon Survey	·	1.0 km	MPC · JPL
168082	2006 DJ_{60}	—	February 24, 2006	Kitt Peak	Spacewatch	MAS	840 m	MPC · JPL
168083	2006 DE_{62}	—	February 22, 2006	Catalina	CSS	·	3.4 km	MPC · JPL
168084	2006 DC_{68}	—	February 24, 2006	Catalina	CSS	H	830 m	MPC · JPL
168085	2006 DC_{70}	—	February 20, 2006	Mount Lemmon	Mount Lemmon Survey	·	2.9 km	MPC · JPL
168086	2006 DF_{70}	—	February 20, 2006	Mount Lemmon	Mount Lemmon Survey	·	1.1 km	MPC · JPL
168087	2006 DW_{75}	—	February 24, 2006	Kitt Peak	Spacewatch	·	1.1 km	MPC · JPL
168088	2006 DY_{79}	—	February 24, 2006	Kitt Peak	Spacewatch	·	3.7 km	MPC · JPL
168089	2006 DM_{84}	—	February 24, 2006	Kitt Peak	Spacewatch	fast?	970 m	MPC · JPL
168090	2006 DO_{96}	—	February 24, 2006	Kitt Peak	Spacewatch	RAF	1.1 km	MPC · JPL
168091	2006 DY_{97}	—	February 24, 2006	Kitt Peak	Spacewatch	·	1.8 km	MPC · JPL
168092	2006 DM_{102}	—	February 25, 2006	Mount Lemmon	Mount Lemmon Survey	·	1.1 km	MPC · JPL
168093	2006 DT_{103}	—	February 25, 2006	Mount Lemmon	Mount Lemmon Survey	·	1.6 km	MPC · JPL
168094	2006 DB_{118}	—	February 27, 2006	Kitt Peak	Spacewatch	·	1.7 km	MPC · JPL
168095	2006 DD_{123}	—	February 24, 2006	Kitt Peak	Spacewatch	·	1.9 km	MPC · JPL
168096	2006 DU_{141}	—	February 25, 2006	Kitt Peak	Spacewatch	·	1.7 km	MPC · JPL
168097	2006 DL_{192}	—	February 27, 2006	Kitt Peak	Spacewatch	·	1.4 km	MPC · JPL
168098	2006 DO_{199}	—	February 23, 2006	Anderson Mesa	LONEOS	·	1.1 km	MPC · JPL
168099	2006 DQ_{208}	—	February 25, 2006	Kitt Peak	Spacewatch	·	3.0 km	MPC · JPL
168100	2006 DD_{210}	—	February 20, 2006	Kitt Peak	Spacewatch	·	1.4 km	MPC · JPL

== 168101–168200 ==
back to top

Designation			Discovery			Properties		Ref
Permanent	Provisional	Named after	Date	Site	Discoverer(s)	Category	Diam.	Ref
168101	2006 DJ_{210}	—	February 20, 2006	Kitt Peak	Spacewatch	NYS	1.3 km	MPC · JPL
168102	2006 DB_{212}	—	February 25, 2006	Kitt Peak	Spacewatch	·	1.3 km	MPC · JPL
168103	2006 DS_{212}	—	February 27, 2006	Catalina	CSS	H	1.1 km	MPC · JPL
168104	2006 EQ_{8}	—	March 2, 2006	Kitt Peak	Spacewatch	NYS	2.4 km	MPC · JPL
168105	2006 EJ_{19}	—	March 2, 2006	Kitt Peak	Spacewatch	·	1.9 km	MPC · JPL
168106	2006 EK_{41}	—	March 4, 2006	Kitt Peak	Spacewatch	·	930 m	MPC · JPL
168107	2006 EQ_{41}	—	March 4, 2006	Catalina	CSS	·	2.3 km	MPC · JPL
168108	2006 EM_{51}	—	March 4, 2006	Kitt Peak	Spacewatch	·	1.5 km	MPC · JPL
168109	2006 EN_{53}	—	March 2, 2006	Mount Lemmon	Mount Lemmon Survey	·	2.1 km	MPC · JPL
168110	2006 EE_{61}	—	March 5, 2006	Kitt Peak	Spacewatch	·	2.0 km	MPC · JPL
168111	2006 EZ_{62}	—	March 5, 2006	Kitt Peak	Spacewatch	NYS	1.9 km	MPC · JPL
168112	2006 FG	—	March 19, 2006	Socorro	LINEAR	·	3.8 km	MPC · JPL
168113	2006 FB_{3}	—	March 23, 2006	Kitt Peak	Spacewatch	TIR	4.4 km	MPC · JPL
168114	2006 FU_{8}	—	March 23, 2006	Mount Lemmon	Mount Lemmon Survey	NYS	1.8 km	MPC · JPL
168115	2006 FQ_{9}	—	March 24, 2006	RAS	Lowe, A.	·	3.1 km	MPC · JPL
168116	2006 FL_{11}	—	March 23, 2006	Kitt Peak	Spacewatch	V	1.0 km	MPC · JPL
168117	2006 FW_{11}	—	March 23, 2006	Kitt Peak	Spacewatch	EUN	1.2 km	MPC · JPL
168118	2006 FS_{23}	—	March 24, 2006	Kitt Peak	Spacewatch	MAS	1.2 km	MPC · JPL
168119	2006 FZ_{27}	—	March 24, 2006	Mount Lemmon	Mount Lemmon Survey	·	1.2 km	MPC · JPL
168120	2006 FM_{30}	—	March 25, 2006	Kitt Peak	Spacewatch	·	1.2 km	MPC · JPL
168121	2006 FN_{32}	—	March 25, 2006	Kitt Peak	Spacewatch	·	2.6 km	MPC · JPL
168122	2006 FV_{34}	—	March 25, 2006	Palomar	NEAT	·	1.2 km	MPC · JPL
168123	2006 FP_{37}	—	March 24, 2006	Siding Spring	SSS	·	1.5 km	MPC · JPL
168124	2006 FL_{44}	—	March 23, 2006	Mount Lemmon	Mount Lemmon Survey	·	930 m	MPC · JPL
168125	2006 FS_{44}	—	March 24, 2006	Anderson Mesa	LONEOS	NYS	1.4 km	MPC · JPL
168126 Chengbruce	2006 GK	Chengbruce	April 1, 2006	Lulin Observatory	Q. Ye, Yang, T.-C.	·	2.3 km	MPC · JPL
168127	2006 GC_{3}	—	April 6, 2006	Ottmarsheim	C. Rinner	·	1.1 km	MPC · JPL
168128	2006 GO_{7}	—	April 2, 2006	Kitt Peak	Spacewatch	·	3.1 km	MPC · JPL
168129	2006 GS_{19}	—	April 2, 2006	Kitt Peak	Spacewatch	·	1.0 km	MPC · JPL
168130	2006 GD_{28}	—	April 2, 2006	Kitt Peak	Spacewatch	·	1.8 km	MPC · JPL
168131	2006 GZ_{31}	—	April 6, 2006	Catalina	CSS	JUN	1.5 km	MPC · JPL
168132	2006 GG_{32}	—	April 6, 2006	Siding Spring	SSS	·	5.4 km	MPC · JPL
168133	2006 GE_{37}	—	April 8, 2006	Mount Lemmon	Mount Lemmon Survey	·	2.7 km	MPC · JPL
168134	2006 GP_{37}	—	April 9, 2006	Kitt Peak	Spacewatch	·	1.7 km	MPC · JPL
168135	2006 GU_{38}	—	April 6, 2006	Siding Spring	SSS	·	3.7 km	MPC · JPL
168136	2006 GP_{41}	—	April 7, 2006	Catalina	CSS	·	1.1 km	MPC · JPL
168137	2006 GD_{42}	—	April 9, 2006	Socorro	LINEAR	·	2.0 km	MPC · JPL
168138	2006 GW_{49}	—	April 7, 2006	Catalina	CSS	·	2.4 km	MPC · JPL
168139	2006 GA_{50}	—	April 7, 2006	Siding Spring	SSS	·	5.7 km	MPC · JPL
168140	2006 GB_{52}	—	April 8, 2006	Siding Spring	SSS	·	1.8 km	MPC · JPL
168141	2006 HL	—	April 18, 2006	Kitt Peak	Spacewatch	V	1.1 km	MPC · JPL
168142	2006 HB_{3}	—	April 18, 2006	Kitt Peak	Spacewatch	·	2.6 km	MPC · JPL
168143	2006 HX_{7}	—	April 18, 2006	Kitt Peak	Spacewatch	·	1.1 km	MPC · JPL
168144	2006 HP_{8}	—	April 19, 2006	Kitt Peak	Spacewatch	·	1.8 km	MPC · JPL
168145	2006 HA_{24}	—	April 20, 2006	Kitt Peak	Spacewatch	·	1.2 km	MPC · JPL
168146	2006 HY_{24}	—	April 20, 2006	Kitt Peak	Spacewatch	·	1.7 km	MPC · JPL
168147	2006 HV_{27}	—	April 20, 2006	Kitt Peak	Spacewatch	·	2.7 km	MPC · JPL
168148	2006 HP_{30}	—	April 25, 2006	RAS	Lowe, A.	GEF	1.8 km	MPC · JPL
168149	2006 HH_{31}	—	April 18, 2006	Anderson Mesa	LONEOS	·	2.1 km	MPC · JPL
168150	2006 HA_{33}	—	April 19, 2006	Palomar	NEAT	·	1.3 km	MPC · JPL
168151	2006 HC_{35}	—	April 19, 2006	Mount Lemmon	Mount Lemmon Survey	·	3.7 km	MPC · JPL
168152	2006 HO_{40}	—	April 21, 2006	Catalina	CSS	·	1.3 km	MPC · JPL
168153	2006 HJ_{42}	—	April 23, 2006	Kitt Peak	Spacewatch	NYS	1.8 km	MPC · JPL
168154	2006 HM_{42}	—	April 23, 2006	Socorro	LINEAR	EUP	7.5 km	MPC · JPL
168155	2006 HY_{46}	—	April 20, 2006	Kitt Peak	Spacewatch	·	1.8 km	MPC · JPL
168156	2006 HZ_{46}	—	April 20, 2006	Kitt Peak	Spacewatch	·	1.6 km	MPC · JPL
168157	2006 HE_{47}	—	April 20, 2006	Catalina	CSS	·	4.0 km	MPC · JPL
168158	2006 HQ_{49}	—	April 25, 2006	Socorro	LINEAR	EUN	2.2 km	MPC · JPL
168159	2006 HH_{52}	—	April 18, 2006	Anderson Mesa	LONEOS	·	1.8 km	MPC · JPL
168160	2006 HB_{55}	—	April 21, 2006	Socorro	LINEAR	·	2.6 km	MPC · JPL
168161	2006 HE_{57}	—	April 24, 2006	Socorro	LINEAR	V	940 m	MPC · JPL
168162	2006 HK_{57}	—	April 24, 2006	Anderson Mesa	LONEOS	·	2.5 km	MPC · JPL
168163	2006 HW_{59}	—	April 24, 2006	Anderson Mesa	LONEOS	MAR	1.6 km	MPC · JPL
168164	2006 HV_{60}	—	April 27, 2006	Bergisch Gladbach	W. Bickel	EUN	1.7 km	MPC · JPL
168165	2006 HA_{61}	—	April 28, 2006	Socorro	LINEAR	(194)	2.8 km	MPC · JPL
168166	2006 HT_{63}	—	April 24, 2006	Kitt Peak	Spacewatch	·	2.4 km	MPC · JPL
168167	2006 HU_{63}	—	April 24, 2006	Kitt Peak	Spacewatch	·	2.5 km	MPC · JPL
168168	2006 HD_{69}	—	April 24, 2006	Mount Lemmon	Mount Lemmon Survey	MRX	1.5 km	MPC · JPL
168169	2006 HP_{69}	—	April 24, 2006	Kitt Peak	Spacewatch	ADE	3.8 km	MPC · JPL
168170	2006 HX_{76}	—	April 25, 2006	Palomar	NEAT	·	1.8 km	MPC · JPL
168171	2006 HM_{77}	—	April 25, 2006	Kitt Peak	Spacewatch	EUN	2.1 km	MPC · JPL
168172	2006 HE_{80}	—	April 26, 2006	Kitt Peak	Spacewatch	·	1.6 km	MPC · JPL
168173	2006 HF_{82}	—	April 26, 2006	Kitt Peak	Spacewatch	slow	2.4 km	MPC · JPL
168174	2006 HG_{82}	—	April 26, 2006	Kitt Peak	Spacewatch	NYS	1.7 km	MPC · JPL
168175	2006 HP_{83}	—	April 26, 2006	Kitt Peak	Spacewatch	·	3.3 km	MPC · JPL
168176	2006 HS_{83}	—	April 26, 2006	Kitt Peak	Spacewatch	·	4.2 km	MPC · JPL
168177	2006 HU_{83}	—	April 26, 2006	Kitt Peak	Spacewatch	·	1.2 km	MPC · JPL
168178	2006 HN_{84}	—	April 26, 2006	Kitt Peak	Spacewatch	·	2.7 km	MPC · JPL
168179	2006 HT_{85}	—	April 27, 2006	Kitt Peak	Spacewatch	·	900 m	MPC · JPL
168180	2006 HV_{88}	—	April 30, 2006	Kitt Peak	Spacewatch	·	2.5 km	MPC · JPL
168181	2006 HQ_{90}	—	April 26, 2006	Kitt Peak	Spacewatch	·	1.5 km	MPC · JPL
168182	2006 HS_{90}	—	April 26, 2006	Anderson Mesa	LONEOS	·	3.0 km	MPC · JPL
168183	2006 HT_{96}	—	April 30, 2006	Kitt Peak	Spacewatch	·	3.8 km	MPC · JPL
168184	2006 HH_{102}	—	April 30, 2006	Kitt Peak	Spacewatch	·	1.9 km	MPC · JPL
168185	2006 HV_{102}	—	April 30, 2006	Kitt Peak	Spacewatch	·	2.3 km	MPC · JPL
168186	2006 HX_{108}	—	April 30, 2006	Catalina	CSS	·	3.1 km	MPC · JPL
168187	2006 HG_{114}	—	April 25, 2006	Mount Lemmon	Mount Lemmon Survey	·	1.7 km	MPC · JPL
168188	2006 HN_{115}	—	April 26, 2006	Kitt Peak	Spacewatch	·	1.4 km	MPC · JPL
168189	2006 HF_{117}	—	April 26, 2006	Mount Lemmon	Mount Lemmon Survey	EUN	2.1 km	MPC · JPL
168190	2006 HA_{121}	—	April 30, 2006	Kitt Peak	Spacewatch	·	2.1 km	MPC · JPL
168191	2006 HQ_{152}	—	April 30, 2006	Catalina	CSS	·	1.9 km	MPC · JPL
168192	2006 JZ	—	May 3, 2006	Reedy Creek	J. Broughton	·	3.5 km	MPC · JPL
168193	2006 JH_{1}	—	May 1, 2006	Kitt Peak	Spacewatch	·	2.9 km	MPC · JPL
168194	2006 JT_{1}	—	May 1, 2006	Socorro	LINEAR	·	2.2 km	MPC · JPL
168195	2006 JZ_{1}	—	May 1, 2006	Socorro	LINEAR	·	1.4 km	MPC · JPL
168196	2006 JL_{5}	—	May 3, 2006	Mount Lemmon	Mount Lemmon Survey	·	1.3 km	MPC · JPL
168197	2006 JV_{10}	—	May 1, 2006	Kitt Peak	Spacewatch	·	1.7 km	MPC · JPL
168198	2006 JR_{17}	—	May 2, 2006	Mount Lemmon	Mount Lemmon Survey	·	2.8 km	MPC · JPL
168199	2006 JY_{18}	—	May 2, 2006	Mount Lemmon	Mount Lemmon Survey	·	2.7 km	MPC · JPL
168200	2006 JZ_{19}	—	May 2, 2006	Kitt Peak	Spacewatch	·	2.9 km	MPC · JPL

== 168201–168300 ==
back to top

Designation			Discovery			Properties		Ref
Permanent	Provisional	Named after	Date	Site	Discoverer(s)	Category	Diam.	Ref
168201	2006 JJ_{23}	—	May 3, 2006	Mount Lemmon	Mount Lemmon Survey	·	2.3 km	MPC · JPL
168202	2006 JP_{26}	—	May 5, 2006	Reedy Creek	J. Broughton	·	1.8 km	MPC · JPL
168203 Kereszturi	2006 JB_{27}	Kereszturi	May 5, 2006	Piszkéstető	K. Sárneczky	NYS	1.2 km	MPC · JPL
168204	2006 JP_{27}	—	May 1, 2006	Socorro	LINEAR	(2076)	1.3 km	MPC · JPL
168205	2006 JE_{28}	—	May 3, 2006	Kitt Peak	Spacewatch	·	3.5 km	MPC · JPL
168206	2006 JH_{29}	—	May 3, 2006	Kitt Peak	Spacewatch	·	2.4 km	MPC · JPL
168207	2006 JK_{29}	—	May 3, 2006	Kitt Peak	Spacewatch	·	2.6 km	MPC · JPL
168208	2006 JH_{30}	—	May 3, 2006	Kitt Peak	Spacewatch	V	830 m	MPC · JPL
168209	2006 JP_{30}	—	May 3, 2006	Kitt Peak	Spacewatch	·	1.0 km	MPC · JPL
168210	2006 JW_{37}	—	May 5, 2006	Anderson Mesa	LONEOS	·	1.1 km	MPC · JPL
168211 Juliechapman	2006 JF_{39}	Juliechapman	May 6, 2006	Mount Lemmon	Mount Lemmon Survey	·	4.7 km	MPC · JPL
168212	2006 JJ_{43}	—	May 5, 2006	Kitt Peak	Spacewatch	·	2.7 km	MPC · JPL
168213	2006 JE_{45}	—	May 7, 2006	Mount Lemmon	Mount Lemmon Survey	·	4.4 km	MPC · JPL
168214	2006 JO_{46}	—	May 7, 2006	Kitt Peak	Spacewatch	·	3.3 km	MPC · JPL
168215	2006 JF_{47}	—	May 10, 2006	Palomar	NEAT	·	2.2 km	MPC · JPL
168216	2006 JS_{48}	—	May 8, 2006	Siding Spring	SSS	·	2.8 km	MPC · JPL
168217	2006 JH_{53}	—	May 6, 2006	Mount Lemmon	Mount Lemmon Survey	·	1.5 km	MPC · JPL
168218	2006 JV_{54}	—	May 8, 2006	Mount Lemmon	Mount Lemmon Survey	·	3.0 km	MPC · JPL
168219	2006 JK_{55}	—	May 9, 2006	Mount Lemmon	Mount Lemmon Survey	·	4.8 km	MPC · JPL
168220	2006 JQ_{57}	—	May 8, 2006	Mount Lemmon	Mount Lemmon Survey	·	3.2 km	MPC · JPL
168221 Donjennings	2006 JO_{60}	Donjennings	May 1, 2006	Kitt Peak	M. W. Buie	·	2.3 km	MPC · JPL
168222	2006 KU	—	May 18, 2006	Palomar	NEAT	·	2.6 km	MPC · JPL
168223	2006 KY_{1}	—	May 16, 2006	Palomar	NEAT	·	4.0 km	MPC · JPL
168224	2006 KA_{7}	—	May 19, 2006	Mount Lemmon	Mount Lemmon Survey	·	1.5 km	MPC · JPL
168225	2006 KV_{10}	—	May 19, 2006	Mount Lemmon	Mount Lemmon Survey	·	1.7 km	MPC · JPL
168226	2006 KH_{15}	—	May 20, 2006	Mount Lemmon	Mount Lemmon Survey	·	3.3 km	MPC · JPL
168227	2006 KQ_{27}	—	May 20, 2006	Kitt Peak	Spacewatch	·	2.1 km	MPC · JPL
168228	2006 KA_{32}	—	May 20, 2006	Kitt Peak	Spacewatch	NYS	1.5 km	MPC · JPL
168229	2006 KH_{35}	—	May 20, 2006	Kitt Peak	Spacewatch	NYS	2.5 km	MPC · JPL
168230	2006 KV_{39}	—	May 23, 2006	Siding Spring	SSS	EUN	1.8 km	MPC · JPL
168231	2006 KK_{40}	—	May 18, 2006	Palomar	NEAT	EOS	3.1 km	MPC · JPL
168232	2006 KO_{41}	—	May 19, 2006	Palomar	NEAT	·	1.8 km	MPC · JPL
168233	2006 KC_{44}	—	May 21, 2006	Kitt Peak	Spacewatch	·	3.5 km	MPC · JPL
168234 Hsi Ching	2006 KX_{67}	Hsi Ching	May 25, 2006	Lulin Observatory	Q. Ye, Lin, H.-C.	RAF	1.5 km	MPC · JPL
168235	2006 KZ_{72}	—	May 23, 2006	Kitt Peak	Spacewatch	·	3.0 km	MPC · JPL
168236	2006 KA_{80}	—	May 25, 2006	Mount Lemmon	Mount Lemmon Survey	PAD	3.5 km	MPC · JPL
168237	2006 KH_{80}	—	May 25, 2006	Mount Lemmon	Mount Lemmon Survey	·	2.2 km	MPC · JPL
168238	2006 KM_{80}	—	May 25, 2006	Mount Lemmon	Mount Lemmon Survey	·	2.4 km	MPC · JPL
168239	2006 KK_{82}	—	May 25, 2006	Mount Lemmon	Mount Lemmon Survey	·	4.1 km	MPC · JPL
168240	2006 KW_{84}	—	May 24, 2006	Palomar	NEAT	·	2.1 km	MPC · JPL
168241	2006 KD_{86}	—	May 21, 2006	Catalina	CSS	·	4.3 km	MPC · JPL
168242	2006 KO_{86}	—	May 24, 2006	Palomar	NEAT	·	1.9 km	MPC · JPL
168243	2006 KB_{90}	—	May 22, 2006	Siding Spring	SSS	·	5.1 km	MPC · JPL
168244	2006 KW_{98}	—	May 26, 2006	Socorro	LINEAR	·	3.5 km	MPC · JPL
168245	2006 KX_{98}	—	May 26, 2006	Mount Lemmon	Mount Lemmon Survey	·	1.9 km	MPC · JPL
168246	2006 KF_{101}	—	May 25, 2006	Mount Lemmon	Mount Lemmon Survey	·	2.1 km	MPC · JPL
168247	2006 KA_{102}	—	May 27, 2006	Kitt Peak	Spacewatch	EMA	4.9 km	MPC · JPL
168248	2006 KC_{103}	—	May 29, 2006	Socorro	LINEAR	MAR	1.4 km	MPC · JPL
168249	2006 KF_{105}	—	May 28, 2006	Kitt Peak	Spacewatch	MAR	2.0 km	MPC · JPL
168250	2006 KU_{109}	—	May 31, 2006	Mount Lemmon	Mount Lemmon Survey	V	1.0 km	MPC · JPL
168251	2006 KY_{121}	—	May 30, 2006	Siding Spring	SSS	·	2.6 km	MPC · JPL
168252	2006 LA_{1}	—	June 2, 2006	Hibiscus	S. F. Hönig, Teamo, N.	·	4.3 km	MPC · JPL
168253	2006 LZ_{2}	—	June 14, 2006	Palomar	NEAT	NEM	4.0 km	MPC · JPL
168254	2006 LY_{3}	—	June 15, 2006	Kitt Peak	Spacewatch	·	2.2 km	MPC · JPL
168255	2006 LO_{7}	—	June 6, 2006	Siding Spring	SSS	·	6.5 km	MPC · JPL
168256	2006 MY	—	June 16, 2006	Kitt Peak	Spacewatch	PHO	1.4 km	MPC · JPL
168257	2006 MF_{1}	—	June 16, 2006	Kitt Peak	Spacewatch	MAR	1.9 km	MPC · JPL
168258	2006 MO_{3}	—	June 16, 2006	Palomar	NEAT	·	2.7 km	MPC · JPL
168259	2006 MM_{9}	—	June 19, 2006	Kitt Peak	Spacewatch	·	2.9 km	MPC · JPL
168260	2006 NT	—	July 2, 2006	Eskridge	Farpoint	·	3.3 km	MPC · JPL
168261 Puglia	2006 PW_{3}	Puglia	August 15, 2006	Suno	V. S. Casulli	·	4.3 km	MPC · JPL
168262	2006 PJ_{27}	—	August 12, 2006	Siding Spring	SSS	·	6.6 km	MPC · JPL
168263	2006 PX_{36}	—	August 12, 2006	Palomar	NEAT	·	3.9 km	MPC · JPL
168264	2006 PO_{37}	—	August 13, 2006	Palomar	NEAT	EOS ·	6.5 km	MPC · JPL
168265	2006 QH_{37}	—	August 16, 2006	Siding Spring	SSS	·	3.0 km	MPC · JPL
168266	2006 QJ_{46}	—	August 20, 2006	Palomar	NEAT	·	3.0 km	MPC · JPL
168267	2006 SA_{353}	—	September 30, 2006	Catalina	CSS	·	4.3 km	MPC · JPL
168268	2007 PQ_{1}	—	August 5, 2007	Črni Vrh	Skvarč, J.	DOR	4.7 km	MPC · JPL
168269	2007 PS_{1}	—	August 5, 2007	Reedy Creek	J. Broughton	MAS	1.3 km	MPC · JPL
168270	2007 PY_{1}	—	August 6, 2007	Great Shefford	Birtwhistle, P.	·	3.8 km	MPC · JPL
168271	2007 PE_{6}	—	August 8, 2007	Socorro	LINEAR	·	2.8 km	MPC · JPL
168272	2007 PY_{7}	—	August 10, 2007	Reedy Creek	J. Broughton	·	2.7 km	MPC · JPL
168273	2007 PJ_{16}	—	August 8, 2007	Socorro	LINEAR	·	5.2 km	MPC · JPL
168274	2007 PU_{16}	—	August 8, 2007	Socorro	LINEAR	NYS	2.3 km	MPC · JPL
168275	2007 PZ_{16}	—	August 8, 2007	Socorro	LINEAR	NYS	2.1 km	MPC · JPL
168276	2007 PS_{17}	—	August 9, 2007	Socorro	LINEAR	·	4.1 km	MPC · JPL
168277	2007 PP_{21}	—	August 9, 2007	Socorro	LINEAR	·	7.4 km	MPC · JPL
168278	2007 PJ_{29}	—	August 9, 2007	Socorro	LINEAR	·	1.5 km	MPC · JPL
168279	2007 PV_{32}	—	August 9, 2007	Socorro	LINEAR	NYS	2.0 km	MPC · JPL
168280	2007 QR_{5}	—	August 18, 2007	Purple Mountain	PMO NEO Survey Program	L4	10 km	MPC · JPL
168281	2007 QM_{8}	—	August 21, 2007	Anderson Mesa	LONEOS	·	2.1 km	MPC · JPL
168282	2007 QU_{9}	—	August 22, 2007	Socorro	LINEAR	THM	3.8 km	MPC · JPL
168283	2007 RR_{23}	—	September 3, 2007	Catalina	CSS	·	5.6 km	MPC · JPL
168284	2007 RT_{36}	—	September 8, 2007	Anderson Mesa	LONEOS	·	2.6 km	MPC · JPL
168285	2007 RZ_{77}	—	September 10, 2007	Mount Lemmon	Mount Lemmon Survey	·	4.7 km	MPC · JPL
168286	2007 RJ_{117}	—	September 11, 2007	Kitt Peak	Spacewatch	·	810 m	MPC · JPL
168287	2007 RG_{145}	—	September 14, 2007	Socorro	LINEAR	·	1.2 km	MPC · JPL
168288	2007 RO_{210}	—	September 11, 2007	Kitt Peak	Spacewatch	·	1.9 km	MPC · JPL
168289	2007 SD	—	September 17, 2007	RAS	Lowe, A.	NYS	1.7 km	MPC · JPL
168290	2045 P-L	—	September 24, 1960	Palomar	C. J. van Houten, I. van Houten-Groeneveld, T. Gehrels	·	2.0 km	MPC · JPL
168291	3041 P-L	—	September 24, 1960	Palomar	C. J. van Houten, I. van Houten-Groeneveld, T. Gehrels	·	2.7 km	MPC · JPL
168292	4267 P-L	—	September 25, 1960	Palomar	C. J. van Houten, I. van Houten-Groeneveld, T. Gehrels	·	3.5 km	MPC · JPL
168293	4724 P-L	—	September 24, 1960	Palomar	C. J. van Houten, I. van Houten-Groeneveld, T. Gehrels	·	1.3 km	MPC · JPL
168294	4883 P-L	—	September 24, 1960	Palomar	C. J. van Houten, I. van Houten-Groeneveld, T. Gehrels	NYS	1.3 km	MPC · JPL
168295	6280 P-L	—	September 24, 1960	Palomar	C. J. van Houten, I. van Houten-Groeneveld, T. Gehrels	·	4.6 km	MPC · JPL
168296	6740 P-L	—	September 24, 1960	Palomar	C. J. van Houten, I. van Houten-Groeneveld, T. Gehrels	·	4.9 km	MPC · JPL
168297	7575 P-L	—	October 17, 1960	Palomar	C. J. van Houten, I. van Houten-Groeneveld, T. Gehrels	·	1.4 km	MPC · JPL
168298	3230 T-1	—	March 26, 1971	Palomar	C. J. van Houten, I. van Houten-Groeneveld, T. Gehrels	·	3.1 km	MPC · JPL
168299	1048 T-2	—	September 29, 1973	Palomar	C. J. van Houten, I. van Houten-Groeneveld, T. Gehrels	URS	6.6 km	MPC · JPL
168300	1217 T-2	—	September 29, 1973	Palomar	C. J. van Houten, I. van Houten-Groeneveld, T. Gehrels	·	4.3 km	MPC · JPL

== 168301–168400 ==
back to top

Designation			Discovery			Properties		Ref
Permanent	Provisional	Named after	Date	Site	Discoverer(s)	Category	Diam.	Ref
168301	1315 T-2	—	September 29, 1973	Palomar	C. J. van Houten, I. van Houten-Groeneveld, T. Gehrels	ADE	3.9 km	MPC · JPL
168302	1428 T-2	—	September 29, 1973	Palomar	C. J. van Houten, I. van Houten-Groeneveld, T. Gehrels	·	1.0 km	MPC · JPL
168303	2223 T-2	—	September 29, 1973	Palomar	C. J. van Houten, I. van Houten-Groeneveld, T. Gehrels	·	3.6 km	MPC · JPL
168304	3125 T-2	—	September 30, 1973	Palomar	C. J. van Houten, I. van Houten-Groeneveld, T. Gehrels	(7605)	7.2 km	MPC · JPL
168305	3205 T-2	—	September 30, 1973	Palomar	C. J. van Houten, I. van Houten-Groeneveld, T. Gehrels	·	2.0 km	MPC · JPL
168306	4255 T-2	—	September 29, 1973	Palomar	C. J. van Houten, I. van Houten-Groeneveld, T. Gehrels	·	5.7 km	MPC · JPL
168307	1206 T-3	—	October 17, 1977	Palomar	C. J. van Houten, I. van Houten-Groeneveld, T. Gehrels	·	3.0 km	MPC · JPL
168308	1216 T-3	—	October 17, 1977	Palomar	C. J. van Houten, I. van Houten-Groeneveld, T. Gehrels	·	2.1 km	MPC · JPL
168309	2167 T-3	—	October 16, 1977	Palomar	C. J. van Houten, I. van Houten-Groeneveld, T. Gehrels	·	2.1 km	MPC · JPL
168310	2316 T-3	—	October 16, 1977	Palomar	C. J. van Houten, I. van Houten-Groeneveld, T. Gehrels	·	1.3 km	MPC · JPL
168311	3312 T-3	—	October 16, 1977	Palomar	C. J. van Houten, I. van Houten-Groeneveld, T. Gehrels	·	1.0 km	MPC · JPL
168312	3396 T-3	—	October 16, 1977	Palomar	C. J. van Houten, I. van Houten-Groeneveld, T. Gehrels	MIS	3.3 km	MPC · JPL
168313	5009 T-3	—	October 16, 1977	Palomar	C. J. van Houten, I. van Houten-Groeneveld, T. Gehrels	·	2.5 km	MPC · JPL
168314	1981 EW_{6}	—	March 6, 1981	Siding Spring	S. J. Bus	·	1.1 km	MPC · JPL
168315	1982 RA_{1}	—	September 13, 1982	Harvard Observatory	Oak Ridge Observatory	fast	2.4 km	MPC · JPL
168316	1982 WD	—	November 25, 1982	Palomar	R. S. Dunbar	·	3.6 km	MPC · JPL
168317	1988 RY_{4}	—	September 2, 1988	La Silla	H. Debehogne	·	4.1 km	MPC · JPL
168318	1989 DA	—	February 27, 1989	Palomar	Phinney, J.	APO · PHA	900 m	MPC · JPL
168319	1990 RW_{2}	—	September 15, 1990	Palomar	H. E. Holt	(5)	2.7 km	MPC · JPL
168320	1990 WG_{5}	—	November 16, 1990	La Silla	E. W. Elst	·	6.0 km	MPC · JPL
168321 Josephschmidt	1991 RJ_{3}	Josephschmidt	September 12, 1991	Tautenburg Observatory	F. Börngen, L. D. Schmadel	·	3.7 km	MPC · JPL
168322	1992 EX_{7}	—	March 2, 1992	La Silla	UESAC	(5)	1.9 km	MPC · JPL
168323	1992 ED_{23}	—	March 1, 1992	La Silla	UESAC	·	1.1 km	MPC · JPL
168324	1993 FA_{19}	—	March 17, 1993	La Silla	UESAC	HYG	3.2 km	MPC · JPL
168325	1993 FT_{27}	—	March 21, 1993	La Silla	UESAC	HYG	4.4 km	MPC · JPL
168326	1993 FJ_{59}	—	March 19, 1993	La Silla	UESAC	·	2.5 km	MPC · JPL
168327	1993 FZ_{60}	—	March 19, 1993	La Silla	UESAC	HYG	3.9 km	MPC · JPL
168328	1993 NX_{1}	—	July 12, 1993	La Silla	E. W. Elst	·	850 m	MPC · JPL
168329	1993 TN_{6}	—	October 9, 1993	Kitt Peak	Spacewatch	·	2.0 km	MPC · JPL
168330	1993 TZ_{7}	—	October 10, 1993	Kitt Peak	Spacewatch	MRX	1.8 km	MPC · JPL
168331	1993 TA_{8}	—	October 10, 1993	Kitt Peak	Spacewatch	·	2.4 km	MPC · JPL
168332	1993 TC_{28}	—	October 9, 1993	La Silla	E. W. Elst	HOF	3.7 km	MPC · JPL
168333	1994 CU_{17}	—	February 8, 1994	La Silla	E. W. Elst	NYS	2.0 km	MPC · JPL
168334	1994 PQ_{1}	—	August 12, 1994	Siding Spring	R. H. McNaught	·	2.8 km	MPC · JPL
168335	1994 PW_{24}	—	August 12, 1994	La Silla	E. W. Elst	·	2.2 km	MPC · JPL
168336	1994 PV_{28}	—	August 12, 1994	La Silla	E. W. Elst	·	2.1 km	MPC · JPL
168337	1994 SK_{1}	—	September 27, 1994	Kitt Peak	Spacewatch	·	4.5 km	MPC · JPL
168338	1994 UW_{10}	—	October 29, 1994	Kitt Peak	Spacewatch	·	2.3 km	MPC · JPL
168339	1995 FS_{8}	—	March 26, 1995	Kitt Peak	Spacewatch	·	1.3 km	MPC · JPL
168340	1995 JE_{1}	—	May 4, 1995	Kitt Peak	Spacewatch	H	950 m	MPC · JPL
168341	1995 MT_{1}	—	June 23, 1995	Kitt Peak	Spacewatch	·	1.9 km	MPC · JPL
168342	1995 MG_{4}	—	June 29, 1995	Kitt Peak	Spacewatch	·	2.1 km	MPC · JPL
168343	1995 OJ_{2}	—	July 22, 1995	Kitt Peak	Spacewatch	·	5.0 km	MPC · JPL
168344	1995 OD_{14}	—	July 23, 1995	Kitt Peak	Spacewatch	·	3.1 km	MPC · JPL
168345	1995 SR_{30}	—	September 20, 1995	Kitt Peak	Spacewatch	MAS	1.2 km	MPC · JPL
168346	1995 SH_{89}	—	September 29, 1995	Kitt Peak	Spacewatch	(5)	1.6 km	MPC · JPL
168347	1995 UG_{13}	—	October 17, 1995	Kitt Peak	Spacewatch	MAS	1.2 km	MPC · JPL
168348	1995 UZ_{18}	—	October 19, 1995	Kitt Peak	Spacewatch	·	3.3 km	MPC · JPL
168349	1995 UZ_{30}	—	October 20, 1995	Kitt Peak	Spacewatch	·	4.2 km	MPC · JPL
168350	1995 UX_{42}	—	October 24, 1995	Kitt Peak	Spacewatch	·	1.1 km	MPC · JPL
168351	1995 UY_{51}	—	October 20, 1995	Kitt Peak	Spacewatch	·	1.1 km	MPC · JPL
168352	1995 VV_{3}	—	November 14, 1995	Kitt Peak	Spacewatch	HYG	3.6 km	MPC · JPL
168353	1995 VQ_{5}	—	November 14, 1995	Kitt Peak	Spacewatch	·	5.5 km	MPC · JPL
168354	1996 AE_{6}	—	January 12, 1996	Kitt Peak	Spacewatch	·	1.7 km	MPC · JPL
168355	1996 AU_{8}	—	January 13, 1996	Kitt Peak	Spacewatch	·	1.4 km	MPC · JPL
168356	1996 AF_{15}	—	January 12, 1996	Kitt Peak	Spacewatch	·	2.7 km	MPC · JPL
168357	1996 CF_{2}	—	February 15, 1996	Kitt Peak	Spacewatch	·	2.3 km	MPC · JPL
168358 Casca	1996 DF_{2}	Casca	February 24, 1996	NRC-DAO	D. D. Balam	·	1.6 km	MPC · JPL
168359	1996 DH_{3}	—	February 29, 1996	Haleakala	AMOS	·	2.8 km	MPC · JPL
168360	1996 PC	—	August 6, 1996	Prescott	P. G. Comba	·	2.8 km	MPC · JPL
168361	1996 RB_{18}	—	September 14, 1996	Kitt Peak	Spacewatch	·	1.3 km	MPC · JPL
168362	1996 RV_{28}	—	September 11, 1996	La Silla	Uppsala-DLR Trojan Survey	L4	15 km	MPC · JPL
168363	1996 TG_{18}	—	October 4, 1996	Kitt Peak	Spacewatch	·	1.8 km	MPC · JPL
168364	1996 TZ_{19}	—	October 5, 1996	Kitt Peak	Spacewatch	L4	10 km	MPC · JPL
168365	1996 TT_{25}	—	October 6, 1996	Kitt Peak	Spacewatch	MAS	820 m	MPC · JPL
168366	1996 TC_{42}	—	October 8, 1996	La Silla	E. W. Elst	·	2.8 km	MPC · JPL
168367	1996 UT_{4}	—	October 18, 1996	Caussols	ODAS	·	1.9 km	MPC · JPL
168368	1996 WU_{3}	—	November 18, 1996	Kitt Peak	Spacewatch	·	3.8 km	MPC · JPL
168369	1996 XP_{6}	—	December 1, 1996	Kitt Peak	Spacewatch	·	4.2 km	MPC · JPL
168370	1996 XA_{17}	—	December 4, 1996	Kitt Peak	Spacewatch	THM	3.1 km	MPC · JPL
168371	1996 XF_{20}	—	December 4, 1996	Kitt Peak	Spacewatch	·	4.4 km	MPC · JPL
168372	1996 XV_{22}	—	December 12, 1996	Kitt Peak	Spacewatch	·	4.9 km	MPC · JPL
168373	1997 CC_{11}	—	February 3, 1997	Kitt Peak	Spacewatch	·	1.3 km	MPC · JPL
168374	1997 CH_{23}	—	February 4, 1997	Kitt Peak	Spacewatch	·	3.6 km	MPC · JPL
168375	1997 EE_{1}	—	March 3, 1997	Kitt Peak	Spacewatch	MAR	1.3 km	MPC · JPL
168376	1997 EK_{15}	—	March 4, 1997	Kitt Peak	Spacewatch	·	1.3 km	MPC · JPL
168377	1997 EY_{16}	—	March 8, 1997	Kitt Peak	Spacewatch	·	2.5 km	MPC · JPL
168378	1997 ET_{30}	—	March 12, 1997	Kitt Peak	Spacewatch	AMO +1km	840 m	MPC · JPL
168379	1997 GB_{15}	—	April 3, 1997	Socorro	LINEAR	NYS	1.9 km	MPC · JPL
168380	1997 HX_{16}	—	April 30, 1997	Kitt Peak	Spacewatch	·	2.2 km	MPC · JPL
168381	1997 LY_{4}	—	June 10, 1997	Xinglong	SCAP	·	1.1 km	MPC · JPL
168382	1997 MC_{6}	—	June 26, 1997	Kitt Peak	Spacewatch	·	4.1 km	MPC · JPL
168383	1997 MG_{8}	—	June 29, 1997	Kitt Peak	Spacewatch	·	1.3 km	MPC · JPL
168384	1997 NP_{3}	—	July 6, 1997	Kitt Peak	Spacewatch	·	2.8 km	MPC · JPL
168385	1997 RH_{4}	—	September 5, 1997	Caussols	ODAS	·	1.3 km	MPC · JPL
168386	1997 SR_{23}	—	September 29, 1997	Kitt Peak	Spacewatch	KOR	1.8 km	MPC · JPL
168387	1997 SJ_{30}	—	September 30, 1997	Kitt Peak	Spacewatch	KOR	1.7 km	MPC · JPL
168388	1997 TF_{5}	—	October 1, 1997	Caussols	ODAS	·	2.6 km	MPC · JPL
168389	1997 TC_{12}	—	October 2, 1997	Kitt Peak	Spacewatch	·	2.5 km	MPC · JPL
168390	1997 WF_{6}	—	November 23, 1997	Kitt Peak	Spacewatch	·	1.2 km	MPC · JPL
168391	1997 WK_{36}	—	November 29, 1997	Socorro	LINEAR	·	4.1 km	MPC · JPL
168392	1997 YU_{17}	—	December 31, 1997	Kitt Peak	Spacewatch	·	2.9 km	MPC · JPL
168393	1998 AU_{4}	—	January 6, 1998	Kitt Peak	Spacewatch	·	2.5 km	MPC · JPL
168394	1998 BX_{2}	—	January 19, 1998	Nachi-Katsuura	Y. Shimizu, T. Urata	·	8.2 km	MPC · JPL
168395	1998 BQ_{18}	—	January 23, 1998	Kitt Peak	Spacewatch	·	3.5 km	MPC · JPL
168396	1998 BN_{31}	—	January 26, 1998	Kitt Peak	Spacewatch	EOS	5.9 km	MPC · JPL
168397	1998 BD_{48}	—	January 29, 1998	Kitt Peak	Spacewatch	·	850 m	MPC · JPL
168398	1998 DG	—	February 17, 1998	Modra	A. Galád, Pravda, A.	NYS	1.9 km	MPC · JPL
168399	1998 DP_{12}	—	February 24, 1998	Kitt Peak	Spacewatch	·	3.8 km	MPC · JPL
168400	1998 EC_{5}	—	March 1, 1998	Kitt Peak	Spacewatch	VER	4.8 km	MPC · JPL

== 168401–168500 ==
back to top

Designation			Discovery			Properties		Ref
Permanent	Provisional	Named after	Date	Site	Discoverer(s)	Category	Diam.	Ref
168401	1998 EF_{11}	—	March 1, 1998	La Silla	E. W. Elst	·	2.0 km	MPC · JPL
168402	1998 FT_{47}	—	March 20, 1998	Socorro	LINEAR	·	1.8 km	MPC · JPL
168403	1998 FW_{76}	—	March 24, 1998	Socorro	LINEAR	·	2.3 km	MPC · JPL
168404	1998 FP_{92}	—	March 24, 1998	Socorro	LINEAR	(2076)	1.5 km	MPC · JPL
168405	1998 FW_{115}	—	March 31, 1998	Socorro	LINEAR	slow	2.0 km	MPC · JPL
168406	1998 FP_{119}	—	March 20, 1998	Socorro	LINEAR	·	1.4 km	MPC · JPL
168407	1998 FP_{138}	—	March 28, 1998	Socorro	LINEAR	·	1.3 km	MPC · JPL
168408	1998 HY_{11}	—	April 19, 1998	Kitt Peak	Spacewatch	·	970 m	MPC · JPL
168409	1998 HA_{25}	—	April 17, 1998	Kitt Peak	Spacewatch	EOS	3.5 km	MPC · JPL
168410	1998 HG_{99}	—	April 21, 1998	Socorro	LINEAR	MAS	1.5 km	MPC · JPL
168411	1998 HO_{113}	—	April 23, 1998	Socorro	LINEAR	fast	3.2 km	MPC · JPL
168412	1998 HW_{154}	—	April 19, 1998	Socorro	LINEAR	NYS	1.9 km	MPC · JPL
168413	1998 QJ_{10}	—	August 17, 1998	Socorro	LINEAR	·	2.9 km	MPC · JPL
168414	1998 QY_{12}	—	August 17, 1998	Socorro	LINEAR	·	2.1 km	MPC · JPL
168415	1998 QJ_{22}	—	August 17, 1998	Socorro	LINEAR	·	2.0 km	MPC · JPL
168416	1998 QE_{30}	—	August 26, 1998	Xinglong	SCAP	·	2.2 km	MPC · JPL
168417	1998 QF_{42}	—	August 17, 1998	Socorro	LINEAR	ADE	4.3 km	MPC · JPL
168418	1998 QC_{50}	—	August 17, 1998	Socorro	LINEAR	(1547)	3.6 km	MPC · JPL
168419	1998 QE_{50}	—	August 17, 1998	Socorro	LINEAR	·	4.1 km	MPC · JPL
168420	1998 QQ_{56}	—	August 30, 1998	Kitt Peak	Spacewatch	·	1.8 km	MPC · JPL
168421	1998 QW_{75}	—	August 24, 1998	Socorro	LINEAR	·	2.3 km	MPC · JPL
168422	1998 QE_{82}	—	August 24, 1998	Socorro	LINEAR	·	4.5 km	MPC · JPL
168423	1998 QG_{96}	—	August 19, 1998	Socorro	LINEAR	ADE	4.5 km	MPC · JPL
168424	1998 QG_{104}	—	August 26, 1998	La Silla	E. W. Elst	·	2.0 km	MPC · JPL
168425	1998 RB_{29}	—	September 14, 1998	Socorro	LINEAR	·	3.9 km	MPC · JPL
168426	1998 SJ_{54}	—	September 16, 1998	Anderson Mesa	LONEOS	·	4.8 km	MPC · JPL
168427	1998 SL_{69}	—	September 19, 1998	Socorro	LINEAR	(1547)	2.9 km	MPC · JPL
168428	1998 SG_{87}	—	September 26, 1998	Socorro	LINEAR	·	2.7 km	MPC · JPL
168429	1998 SP_{90}	—	September 26, 1998	Socorro	LINEAR	·	2.4 km	MPC · JPL
168430	1998 SR_{96}	—	September 26, 1998	Socorro	LINEAR	·	2.5 km	MPC · JPL
168431	1998 SB_{130}	—	September 26, 1998	Socorro	LINEAR	slow	2.2 km	MPC · JPL
168432	1998 TZ_{8}	—	October 12, 1998	Kitt Peak	Spacewatch	·	3.0 km	MPC · JPL
168433	1998 UM_{5}	—	October 22, 1998	Caussols	ODAS	·	2.7 km	MPC · JPL
168434	1998 VA_{16}	—	November 10, 1998	Socorro	LINEAR	·	3.3 km	MPC · JPL
168435	1998 VL_{21}	—	November 10, 1998	Socorro	LINEAR	ADE ·	3.9 km	MPC · JPL
168436	1998 VH_{22}	—	November 10, 1998	Socorro	LINEAR	·	2.9 km	MPC · JPL
168437	1998 VC_{23}	—	November 10, 1998	Socorro	LINEAR	·	1.8 km	MPC · JPL
168438	1998 VT_{39}	—	November 14, 1998	Kitt Peak	Spacewatch	·	3.7 km	MPC · JPL
168439	1998 VS_{52}	—	November 13, 1998	Socorro	LINEAR	·	4.6 km	MPC · JPL
168440	1998 WT_{2}	—	November 17, 1998	Caussols	ODAS	WIT	1.6 km	MPC · JPL
168441	1998 WD_{3}	—	November 18, 1998	Gekko	T. Kagawa	·	2.5 km	MPC · JPL
168442	1998 XO_{5}	—	December 8, 1998	Kitt Peak	Spacewatch	KOR	2.2 km	MPC · JPL
168443	1998 XL_{9}	—	December 12, 1998	Višnjan Observatory	K. Korlević	·	3.0 km	MPC · JPL
168444	1998 XX_{22}	—	December 11, 1998	Kitt Peak	Spacewatch	·	3.0 km	MPC · JPL
168445	1998 YE_{8}	—	December 21, 1998	Uenohara	N. Kawasato	·	6.0 km	MPC · JPL
168446	1998 YM_{21}	—	December 26, 1998	Kitt Peak	Spacewatch	·	2.7 km	MPC · JPL
168447	1999 AT_{1}	—	January 8, 1999	Kitt Peak	Spacewatch	·	1.2 km	MPC · JPL
168448	1999 AE_{4}	—	January 6, 1999	Anderson Mesa	LONEOS	T_{j} (2.96)	4.4 km	MPC · JPL
168449	1999 AN_{13}	—	January 7, 1999	Kitt Peak	Spacewatch	·	3.6 km	MPC · JPL
168450	1999 AD_{22}	—	January 11, 1999	Xinglong	SCAP	JUN	2.0 km	MPC · JPL
168451	1999 CG_{43}	—	February 10, 1999	Socorro	LINEAR	·	2.9 km	MPC · JPL
168452	1999 CC_{117}	—	February 12, 1999	Socorro	LINEAR	·	4.3 km	MPC · JPL
168453	1999 CG_{130}	—	February 6, 1999	Mauna Kea	Veillet, C.	KOR	1.6 km	MPC · JPL
168454	1999 EB_{10}	—	March 14, 1999	Kitt Peak	Spacewatch	·	4.1 km	MPC · JPL
168455	1999 FM_{1}	—	March 16, 1999	Kitt Peak	Spacewatch	·	1.1 km	MPC · JPL
168456	1999 FC_{4}	—	March 16, 1999	Kitt Peak	Spacewatch	(13314)	2.9 km	MPC · JPL
168457	1999 FE_{5}	—	March 18, 1999	Kitt Peak	Spacewatch	·	1.3 km	MPC · JPL
168458	1999 FK_{12}	—	March 18, 1999	Kitt Peak	Spacewatch	·	5.8 km	MPC · JPL
168459	1999 FV_{20}	—	March 19, 1999	Kitt Peak	Spacewatch	·	4.5 km	MPC · JPL
168460	1999 GM_{3}	—	April 7, 1999	Kitt Peak	Spacewatch	·	1.2 km	MPC · JPL
168461	1999 HY_{4}	—	April 17, 1999	Kitt Peak	Spacewatch	·	5.3 km	MPC · JPL
168462	1999 JT_{29}	—	May 10, 1999	Socorro	LINEAR	·	1.2 km	MPC · JPL
168463	1999 JD_{47}	—	May 10, 1999	Socorro	LINEAR	·	5.9 km	MPC · JPL
168464	1999 JR_{71}	—	May 12, 1999	Socorro	LINEAR	·	1.3 km	MPC · JPL
168465	1999 JR_{89}	—	May 12, 1999	Socorro	LINEAR	·	7.1 km	MPC · JPL
168466	1999 JM_{112}	—	May 13, 1999	Socorro	LINEAR	·	6.3 km	MPC · JPL
168467	1999 JW_{127}	—	May 10, 1999	Socorro	LINEAR	·	4.8 km	MPC · JPL
168468	1999 KK_{2}	—	May 16, 1999	Kitt Peak	Spacewatch	NYS	1.3 km	MPC · JPL
168469	1999 KS_{10}	—	May 18, 1999	Socorro	LINEAR	BAP	1.5 km	MPC · JPL
168470	1999 LT_{29}	—	June 10, 1999	Kitt Peak	Spacewatch	·	1.2 km	MPC · JPL
168471	1999 LS_{30}	—	June 12, 1999	Kitt Peak	Spacewatch	·	1.6 km	MPC · JPL
168472	1999 PQ_{4}	—	August 8, 1999	Uenohara	N. Kawasato	·	3.0 km	MPC · JPL
168473	1999 QU_{1}	—	August 20, 1999	Gnosca	S. Sposetti	·	1.5 km	MPC · JPL
168474	1999 RN_{3}	—	September 4, 1999	Catalina	CSS	·	1.8 km	MPC · JPL
168475	1999 RN_{24}	—	September 7, 1999	Socorro	LINEAR	MAS	1.2 km	MPC · JPL
168476	1999 RM_{30}	—	September 8, 1999	Socorro	LINEAR	H	680 m	MPC · JPL
168477	1999 RE_{31}	—	September 8, 1999	Socorro	LINEAR	H	860 m	MPC · JPL
168478	1999 RF_{60}	—	September 7, 1999	Socorro	LINEAR	·	2.9 km	MPC · JPL
168479	1999 RQ_{62}	—	September 7, 1999	Socorro	LINEAR	NYS	3.3 km	MPC · JPL
168480	1999 RJ_{81}	—	September 7, 1999	Socorro	LINEAR	·	2.3 km	MPC · JPL
168481	1999 RN_{85}	—	September 7, 1999	Socorro	LINEAR	MAS	1.3 km	MPC · JPL
168482	1999 RD_{123}	—	September 9, 1999	Socorro	LINEAR	·	1.8 km	MPC · JPL
168483	1999 RV_{124}	—	September 13, 1999	Kitt Peak	Spacewatch	·	1.3 km	MPC · JPL
168484	1999 RP_{125}	—	September 9, 1999	Socorro	LINEAR	·	3.1 km	MPC · JPL
168485	1999 RP_{134}	—	September 9, 1999	Socorro	LINEAR	·	2.5 km	MPC · JPL
168486	1999 RS_{134}	—	September 9, 1999	Socorro	LINEAR	·	2.7 km	MPC · JPL
168487	1999 RV_{138}	—	September 9, 1999	Socorro	LINEAR	·	1.8 km	MPC · JPL
168488	1999 RZ_{147}	—	September 9, 1999	Socorro	LINEAR	·	2.0 km	MPC · JPL
168489	1999 RM_{150}	—	September 9, 1999	Socorro	LINEAR	·	1.5 km	MPC · JPL
168490	1999 RC_{152}	—	September 9, 1999	Socorro	LINEAR	·	2.8 km	MPC · JPL
168491	1999 RT_{153}	—	September 9, 1999	Socorro	LINEAR	EUN	2.0 km	MPC · JPL
168492	1999 RL_{159}	—	September 9, 1999	Socorro	LINEAR	MAS	1.2 km	MPC · JPL
168493	1999 RQ_{163}	—	September 9, 1999	Socorro	LINEAR	NYS	2.3 km	MPC · JPL
168494	1999 RE_{177}	—	September 9, 1999	Socorro	LINEAR	NYS	2.1 km	MPC · JPL
168495	1999 RB_{188}	—	September 9, 1999	Socorro	LINEAR	MAS	1.3 km	MPC · JPL
168496	1999 RN_{191}	—	September 11, 1999	Socorro	LINEAR	NYS	1.2 km	MPC · JPL
168497	1999 RX_{207}	—	September 8, 1999	Socorro	LINEAR	·	2.4 km	MPC · JPL
168498	1999 RG_{208}	—	September 8, 1999	Socorro	LINEAR	MAR	1.9 km	MPC · JPL
168499	1999 RK_{223}	—	September 7, 1999	Socorro	LINEAR	·	1.8 km	MPC · JPL
168500	1999 RJ_{249}	—	September 7, 1999	Socorro	LINEAR	·	4.4 km	MPC · JPL

== 168501–168600 ==
back to top

Designation			Discovery			Properties		Ref
Permanent	Provisional	Named after	Date	Site	Discoverer(s)	Category	Diam.	Ref
168501	1999 RQ_{249}	—	September 4, 1999	Catalina	CSS	·	4.8 km	MPC · JPL
168502	1999 SS_{10}	—	September 29, 1999	Xinglong	SCAP	·	1.2 km	MPC · JPL
168503	1999 TL_{8}	—	October 6, 1999	Višnjan Observatory	K. Korlević, M. Jurić	·	2.6 km	MPC · JPL
168504	1999 TL_{15}	—	October 12, 1999	Ondřejov	P. Kušnirák, P. Pravec	·	1.3 km	MPC · JPL
168505	1999 TL_{37}	—	October 13, 1999	Anderson Mesa	LONEOS	·	2.6 km	MPC · JPL
168506	1999 TQ_{50}	—	October 4, 1999	Kitt Peak	Spacewatch	MAS	900 m	MPC · JPL
168507	1999 TC_{64}	—	October 8, 1999	Kitt Peak	Spacewatch	·	1.3 km	MPC · JPL
168508	1999 TT_{68}	—	October 9, 1999	Kitt Peak	Spacewatch	(5)	1.7 km	MPC · JPL
168509	1999 TU_{68}	—	October 9, 1999	Kitt Peak	Spacewatch	·	3.3 km	MPC · JPL
168510	1999 TK_{81}	—	October 12, 1999	Kitt Peak	Spacewatch	·	1.9 km	MPC · JPL
168511	1999 TH_{98}	—	October 2, 1999	Socorro	LINEAR	·	2.7 km	MPC · JPL
168512	1999 TV_{104}	—	October 3, 1999	Socorro	LINEAR	·	1.9 km	MPC · JPL
168513	1999 TE_{131}	—	October 6, 1999	Socorro	LINEAR	NYS	1.7 km	MPC · JPL
168514	1999 TX_{134}	—	October 6, 1999	Socorro	LINEAR	KON	2.6 km	MPC · JPL
168515	1999 TY_{142}	—	October 7, 1999	Socorro	LINEAR	·	1.7 km	MPC · JPL
168516	1999 TY_{159}	—	October 9, 1999	Socorro	LINEAR	·	3.4 km	MPC · JPL
168517	1999 TJ_{166}	—	October 10, 1999	Socorro	LINEAR	T_{j} (2.99) · 3:2	9.0 km	MPC · JPL
168518	1999 TX_{170}	—	October 10, 1999	Socorro	LINEAR	·	2.0 km	MPC · JPL
168519	1999 TS_{193}	—	October 12, 1999	Socorro	LINEAR	V	1.3 km	MPC · JPL
168520	1999 TV_{233}	—	October 3, 1999	Socorro	LINEAR	T_{j} (2.96) · 3:2	6.8 km	MPC · JPL
168521	1999 TV_{236}	—	October 3, 1999	Catalina	CSS	·	1.7 km	MPC · JPL
168522	1999 TM_{238}	—	October 4, 1999	Catalina	CSS	·	1.6 km	MPC · JPL
168523	1999 TN_{242}	—	October 4, 1999	Catalina	CSS	·	2.7 km	MPC · JPL
168524	1999 TO_{253}	—	October 10, 1999	Kitt Peak	Spacewatch	·	1.6 km	MPC · JPL
168525	1999 TM_{259}	—	October 9, 1999	Socorro	LINEAR	T_{j} (2.99) · 3:2 · SHU	9.4 km	MPC · JPL
168526	1999 TG_{279}	—	October 7, 1999	Socorro	LINEAR	·	1.4 km	MPC · JPL
168527	1999 TV_{318}	—	October 12, 1999	Kitt Peak	Spacewatch	·	1.0 km	MPC · JPL
168528	1999 UA_{16}	—	October 29, 1999	Catalina	CSS	·	2.4 km	MPC · JPL
168529	1999 UQ_{20}	—	October 31, 1999	Kitt Peak	Spacewatch	·	1.6 km	MPC · JPL
168530	1999 UU_{33}	—	October 31, 1999	Kitt Peak	Spacewatch	3:2	8.2 km	MPC · JPL
168531 Joshuakammer	1999 VF_{12}	Joshuakammer	November 10, 1999	Kitt Peak	M. W. Buie	H	810 m	MPC · JPL
168532	1999 VV_{21}	—	November 12, 1999	Višnjan Observatory	K. Korlević	·	1.9 km	MPC · JPL
168533	1999 VQ_{39}	—	November 10, 1999	Socorro	LINEAR	·	1.5 km	MPC · JPL
168534	1999 VW_{45}	—	November 4, 1999	Catalina	CSS	·	2.9 km	MPC · JPL
168535	1999 VF_{65}	—	November 4, 1999	Socorro	LINEAR	·	1.6 km	MPC · JPL
168536	1999 VU_{66}	—	November 4, 1999	Socorro	LINEAR	·	2.3 km	MPC · JPL
168537	1999 VG_{68}	—	November 4, 1999	Socorro	LINEAR	·	1.9 km	MPC · JPL
168538	1999 VA_{85}	—	November 6, 1999	Kitt Peak	Spacewatch	NYS	1.8 km	MPC · JPL
168539	1999 VF_{89}	—	November 4, 1999	Socorro	LINEAR	·	1.7 km	MPC · JPL
168540	1999 VT_{95}	—	November 9, 1999	Socorro	LINEAR	·	3.4 km	MPC · JPL
168541	1999 VY_{99}	—	November 9, 1999	Socorro	LINEAR	·	1.0 km	MPC · JPL
168542	1999 VL_{123}	—	November 5, 1999	Kitt Peak	Spacewatch	PAD	3.8 km	MPC · JPL
168543	1999 VL_{128}	—	November 9, 1999	Kitt Peak	Spacewatch	·	2.0 km	MPC · JPL
168544	1999 VE_{149}	—	November 14, 1999	Socorro	LINEAR	·	2.1 km	MPC · JPL
168545	1999 VE_{169}	—	November 14, 1999	Socorro	LINEAR	T_{j} (2.98) · 3:2	8.6 km	MPC · JPL
168546	1999 VA_{189}	—	November 15, 1999	Socorro	LINEAR	·	2.5 km	MPC · JPL
168547	1999 VK_{191}	—	November 12, 1999	Socorro	LINEAR	·	1.4 km	MPC · JPL
168548	1999 VH_{194}	—	November 1, 1999	Socorro	LINEAR	H	1.0 km	MPC · JPL
168549	1999 VR_{209}	—	November 11, 1999	Catalina	CSS	·	2.5 km	MPC · JPL
168550	1999 VQ_{212}	—	November 12, 1999	Socorro	LINEAR	HIL · 3:2	8.7 km	MPC · JPL
168551	1999 WH_{4}	—	November 28, 1999	Chiyoda	T. Kojima	MAS	1.3 km	MPC · JPL
168552	1999 WV_{7}	—	November 29, 1999	Višnjan Observatory	K. Korlević	H	1.2 km	MPC · JPL
168553	1999 WF_{9}	—	November 29, 1999	Črni Vrh	Mikuž, H.	·	3.9 km	MPC · JPL
168554	1999 WS_{13}	—	November 30, 1999	Črni Vrh	Mikuž, H.	·	3.8 km	MPC · JPL
168555	1999 WY_{17}	—	November 30, 1999	Kitt Peak	Spacewatch	MAS	1.1 km	MPC · JPL
168556	1999 WJ_{24}	—	November 28, 1999	Kitt Peak	Spacewatch	·	2.1 km	MPC · JPL
168557	1999 XF_{6}	—	December 4, 1999	Catalina	CSS	3:2 · SHU	12 km	MPC · JPL
168558	1999 XX_{16}	—	December 7, 1999	Socorro	LINEAR	H · slow	1.3 km	MPC · JPL
168559	1999 XE_{26}	—	December 6, 1999	Socorro	LINEAR	·	3.6 km	MPC · JPL
168560	1999 XK_{27}	—	December 6, 1999	Socorro	LINEAR	·	1.9 km	MPC · JPL
168561	1999 XP_{27}	—	December 6, 1999	Socorro	LINEAR	·	1.8 km	MPC · JPL
168562	1999 XM_{39}	—	December 6, 1999	Socorro	LINEAR	·	5.1 km	MPC · JPL
168563	1999 XR_{77}	—	December 7, 1999	Socorro	LINEAR	·	4.6 km	MPC · JPL
168564	1999 XM_{85}	—	December 7, 1999	Socorro	LINEAR	EUN	2.4 km	MPC · JPL
168565	1999 XL_{86}	—	December 7, 1999	Socorro	LINEAR	·	3.0 km	MPC · JPL
168566	1999 XE_{94}	—	December 7, 1999	Socorro	LINEAR	·	3.8 km	MPC · JPL
168567	1999 XH_{94}	—	December 7, 1999	Socorro	LINEAR	(5)	2.4 km	MPC · JPL
168568	1999 XP_{119}	—	December 5, 1999	Catalina	CSS	·	2.6 km	MPC · JPL
168569	1999 XY_{130}	—	December 12, 1999	Socorro	LINEAR	EUN	2.3 km	MPC · JPL
168570	1999 XU_{132}	—	December 12, 1999	Socorro	LINEAR	RAF	2.0 km	MPC · JPL
168571	1999 XB_{136}	—	December 13, 1999	Socorro	LINEAR	H	1.1 km	MPC · JPL
168572	1999 XS_{141}	—	December 10, 1999	Socorro	LINEAR	H	1.3 km	MPC · JPL
168573	1999 XZ_{141}	—	December 12, 1999	Socorro	LINEAR	H	1.2 km	MPC · JPL
168574	1999 XD_{142}	—	December 12, 1999	Socorro	LINEAR	·	2.4 km	MPC · JPL
168575	1999 XL_{142}	—	December 12, 1999	Socorro	LINEAR	H	1.1 km	MPC · JPL
168576	1999 XM_{142}	—	December 12, 1999	Socorro	LINEAR	H	1.1 km	MPC · JPL
168577	1999 XO_{142}	—	December 12, 1999	Socorro	LINEAR	·	2.4 km	MPC · JPL
168578	1999 XJ_{179}	—	December 10, 1999	Socorro	LINEAR	ADE	3.4 km	MPC · JPL
168579	1999 XG_{182}	—	December 12, 1999	Socorro	LINEAR	EUN	2.1 km	MPC · JPL
168580	1999 XS_{208}	—	December 13, 1999	Socorro	LINEAR	·	2.3 km	MPC · JPL
168581	1999 XO_{216}	—	December 13, 1999	Kitt Peak	Spacewatch	·	2.0 km	MPC · JPL
168582	1999 XP_{228}	—	December 14, 1999	Kitt Peak	Spacewatch	·	1.8 km	MPC · JPL
168583	1999 XJ_{231}	—	December 7, 1999	Catalina	CSS	H	1.2 km	MPC · JPL
168584	1999 XN_{233}	—	December 3, 1999	Socorro	LINEAR	·	1.6 km	MPC · JPL
168585	1999 XJ_{236}	—	December 4, 1999	Kitt Peak	Spacewatch	·	2.2 km	MPC · JPL
168586	1999 YN_{1}	—	December 17, 1999	Socorro	LINEAR	H	820 m	MPC · JPL
168587	1999 YM_{6}	—	December 30, 1999	Socorro	LINEAR	H	1.0 km	MPC · JPL
168588	1999 YN_{19}	—	December 29, 1999	Mauna Kea	Veillet, C.	·	1.7 km	MPC · JPL
168589	1999 YU_{27}	—	December 30, 1999	Socorro	LINEAR	·	3.0 km	MPC · JPL
168590	2000 AE_{9}	—	January 2, 2000	Socorro	LINEAR	·	1.8 km	MPC · JPL
168591	2000 AF_{16}	—	January 3, 2000	Socorro	LINEAR	·	3.6 km	MPC · JPL
168592	2000 AY_{24}	—	January 3, 2000	Socorro	LINEAR	·	2.1 km	MPC · JPL
168593	2000 AS_{28}	—	January 3, 2000	Socorro	LINEAR	·	2.3 km	MPC · JPL
168594	2000 AV_{31}	—	January 3, 2000	Socorro	LINEAR	JUN	1.8 km	MPC · JPL
168595	2000 AP_{35}	—	January 3, 2000	Socorro	LINEAR	·	2.4 km	MPC · JPL
168596	2000 AV_{42}	—	January 4, 2000	Socorro	LINEAR	·	3.3 km	MPC · JPL
168597	2000 AW_{47}	—	January 4, 2000	Socorro	LINEAR	(5)	2.4 km	MPC · JPL
168598	2000 AG_{49}	—	January 5, 2000	Socorro	LINEAR	H	1.1 km	MPC · JPL
168599	2000 AY_{63}	—	January 4, 2000	Socorro	LINEAR	·	2.5 km	MPC · JPL
168600	2000 AA_{69}	—	January 5, 2000	Socorro	LINEAR	·	2.8 km	MPC · JPL

== 168601–168700 ==
back to top

Designation			Discovery			Properties		Ref
Permanent	Provisional	Named after	Date	Site	Discoverer(s)	Category	Diam.	Ref
168601	2000 AD_{74}	—	January 5, 2000	Socorro	LINEAR	·	2.7 km	MPC · JPL
168602	2000 AA_{88}	—	January 5, 2000	Socorro	LINEAR	·	3.3 km	MPC · JPL
168603	2000 AH_{126}	—	January 5, 2000	Socorro	LINEAR	H	1.1 km	MPC · JPL
168604	2000 AJ_{133}	—	January 3, 2000	Socorro	LINEAR	·	3.7 km	MPC · JPL
168605	2000 AG_{134}	—	January 4, 2000	Socorro	LINEAR	EUN	2.7 km	MPC · JPL
168606	2000 AS_{154}	—	January 3, 2000	Socorro	LINEAR	·	2.7 km	MPC · JPL
168607	2000 AV_{167}	—	January 8, 2000	Socorro	LINEAR	MAR	1.9 km	MPC · JPL
168608	2000 AA_{176}	—	January 7, 2000	Socorro	LINEAR	·	2.3 km	MPC · JPL
168609	2000 AO_{181}	—	January 7, 2000	Socorro	LINEAR	·	2.2 km	MPC · JPL
168610	2000 AD_{196}	—	January 8, 2000	Socorro	LINEAR	·	4.4 km	MPC · JPL
168611	2000 AJ_{214}	—	January 6, 2000	Kitt Peak	Spacewatch	·	2.5 km	MPC · JPL
168612	2000 AP_{229}	—	January 3, 2000	Kitt Peak	Spacewatch	·	2.5 km	MPC · JPL
168613	2000 AA_{246}	—	January 7, 2000	Mauna Kea	D. J. Tholen, Whiteley, R. J.	·	2.5 km	MPC · JPL
168614	2000 BW_{6}	—	January 27, 2000	Socorro	LINEAR	PHO	1.6 km	MPC · JPL
168615	2000 BC_{12}	—	January 28, 2000	Kitt Peak	Spacewatch	·	2.2 km	MPC · JPL
168616	2000 BN_{21}	—	January 29, 2000	Kitt Peak	Spacewatch	GEF	2.0 km	MPC · JPL
168617	2000 BH_{26}	—	January 30, 2000	Socorro	LINEAR	(5)	1.9 km	MPC · JPL
168618	2000 BT_{26}	—	January 30, 2000	Socorro	LINEAR	·	3.4 km	MPC · JPL
168619	2000 BB_{40}	—	January 27, 2000	Kitt Peak	Spacewatch	PAD	3.9 km	MPC · JPL
168620	2000 BD_{41}	—	January 30, 2000	Kitt Peak	Spacewatch	·	3.1 km	MPC · JPL
168621	2000 CD_{2}	—	February 2, 2000	Oizumi	T. Kobayashi	·	2.6 km	MPC · JPL
168622	2000 CA_{14}	—	February 2, 2000	Socorro	LINEAR	·	2.4 km	MPC · JPL
168623	2000 CU_{15}	—	February 2, 2000	Socorro	LINEAR	EUN	1.8 km	MPC · JPL
168624	2000 CW_{22}	—	February 2, 2000	Socorro	LINEAR	·	2.3 km	MPC · JPL
168625	2000 CN_{28}	—	February 2, 2000	Socorro	LINEAR	·	1.9 km	MPC · JPL
168626	2000 CE_{55}	—	February 3, 2000	Socorro	LINEAR	MIS	3.4 km	MPC · JPL
168627	2000 CO_{65}	—	February 4, 2000	Socorro	LINEAR	·	4.2 km	MPC · JPL
168628	2000 CU_{66}	—	February 6, 2000	Socorro	LINEAR	·	3.7 km	MPC · JPL
168629	2000 CB_{69}	—	February 1, 2000	Kitt Peak	Spacewatch	·	4.2 km	MPC · JPL
168630	2000 CO_{83}	—	February 4, 2000	Socorro	LINEAR	·	3.1 km	MPC · JPL
168631	2000 CG_{84}	—	February 4, 2000	Socorro	LINEAR	·	3.2 km	MPC · JPL
168632	2000 CB_{88}	—	February 4, 2000	Socorro	LINEAR	·	3.4 km	MPC · JPL
168633	2000 CE_{101}	—	February 12, 2000	Kitt Peak	Spacewatch	·	2.2 km	MPC · JPL
168634	2000 CM_{101}	—	February 15, 2000	Oaxaca	Roe, J. M.	·	3.1 km	MPC · JPL
168635 Davidkaufmann	2000 CU_{109}	Davidkaufmann	February 5, 2000	Kitt Peak	M. W. Buie	·	2.2 km	MPC · JPL
168636	2000 CV_{135}	—	February 2, 2000	Kitt Peak	Spacewatch	AGN	1.6 km	MPC · JPL
168637	2000 CC_{137}	—	February 4, 2000	Kitt Peak	Spacewatch	·	2.2 km	MPC · JPL
168638 Waltersiegmund	2000 CH_{149}	Waltersiegmund	February 12, 2000	Apache Point	SDSS	·	2.7 km	MPC · JPL
168639	2000 DC_{9}	—	February 26, 2000	Kitt Peak	Spacewatch	·	3.8 km	MPC · JPL
168640	2000 DM_{10}	—	February 26, 2000	Kitt Peak	Spacewatch	(12739)	2.2 km	MPC · JPL
168641	2000 DA_{11}	—	February 26, 2000	Kitt Peak	Spacewatch	·	2.4 km	MPC · JPL
168642	2000 DT_{36}	—	February 29, 2000	Socorro	LINEAR	·	3.5 km	MPC · JPL
168643	2000 DP_{40}	—	February 29, 2000	Socorro	LINEAR	·	4.1 km	MPC · JPL
168644	2000 DY_{41}	—	February 29, 2000	Socorro	LINEAR	·	3.3 km	MPC · JPL
168645	2000 DU_{48}	—	February 29, 2000	Socorro	LINEAR	·	2.2 km	MPC · JPL
168646	2000 DE_{54}	—	February 29, 2000	Socorro	LINEAR	WIT	1.9 km	MPC · JPL
168647	2000 DF_{54}	—	February 29, 2000	Socorro	LINEAR	·	3.6 km	MPC · JPL
168648	2000 DZ_{56}	—	February 29, 2000	Socorro	LINEAR	·	1.9 km	MPC · JPL
168649	2000 DD_{60}	—	February 29, 2000	Socorro	LINEAR	EOS	2.7 km	MPC · JPL
168650	2000 DN_{63}	—	February 29, 2000	Socorro	LINEAR	AGN	2.2 km	MPC · JPL
168651	2000 DL_{67}	—	February 29, 2000	Socorro	LINEAR	·	2.6 km	MPC · JPL
168652	2000 DH_{68}	—	February 29, 2000	Socorro	LINEAR	·	3.8 km	MPC · JPL
168653	2000 DJ_{82}	—	February 28, 2000	Socorro	LINEAR	·	2.5 km	MPC · JPL
168654	2000 DP_{83}	—	February 28, 2000	Socorro	LINEAR	DOR	3.4 km	MPC · JPL
168655	2000 DV_{84}	—	February 29, 2000	Socorro	LINEAR	·	2.8 km	MPC · JPL
168656	2000 DV_{105}	—	February 29, 2000	Socorro	LINEAR	MRX	2.0 km	MPC · JPL
168657	2000 ED_{10}	—	March 3, 2000	Socorro	LINEAR	·	1.8 km	MPC · JPL
168658	2000 EK_{18}	—	March 5, 2000	Socorro	LINEAR	·	3.9 km	MPC · JPL
168659	2000 EH_{22}	—	March 3, 2000	Kitt Peak	Spacewatch	MRX	1.6 km	MPC · JPL
168660	2000 EN_{33}	—	March 5, 2000	Socorro	LINEAR	·	2.5 km	MPC · JPL
168661	2000 EA_{53}	—	March 3, 2000	Kitt Peak	Spacewatch	·	3.0 km	MPC · JPL
168662	2000 EH_{89}	—	March 9, 2000	Socorro	LINEAR	·	2.3 km	MPC · JPL
168663	2000 EM_{104}	—	March 15, 2000	Socorro	LINEAR	·	4.4 km	MPC · JPL
168664	2000 EC_{110}	—	March 8, 2000	Haleakala	NEAT	·	2.5 km	MPC · JPL
168665	2000 EJ_{113}	—	March 9, 2000	Haleakala	NEAT	·	1.8 km	MPC · JPL
168666	2000 EV_{118}	—	March 11, 2000	Anderson Mesa	LONEOS	EUN	2.1 km	MPC · JPL
168667	2000 EF_{141}	—	March 2, 2000	Kitt Peak	Spacewatch	·	2.2 km	MPC · JPL
168668	2000 EK_{149}	—	March 5, 2000	Socorro	LINEAR	NEM	3.9 km	MPC · JPL
168669	2000 ED_{153}	—	March 6, 2000	Haleakala	NEAT	·	3.5 km	MPC · JPL
168670	2000 ED_{164}	—	March 3, 2000	Socorro	LINEAR	·	2.6 km	MPC · JPL
168671	2000 EH_{176}	—	March 3, 2000	Kitt Peak	Spacewatch	·	2.3 km	MPC · JPL
168672	2000 EV_{181}	—	March 4, 2000	Socorro	LINEAR	·	2.9 km	MPC · JPL
168673	2000 EX_{198}	—	March 2, 2000	Kitt Peak	Spacewatch	·	2.5 km	MPC · JPL
168674	2000 FC	—	March 24, 2000	Prescott	P. G. Comba	(5)	2.5 km	MPC · JPL
168675	2000 FX_{1}	—	March 25, 2000	Kitt Peak	Spacewatch	·	3.4 km	MPC · JPL
168676	2000 FN_{3}	—	March 28, 2000	Socorro	LINEAR	·	4.3 km	MPC · JPL
168677	2000 FP_{4}	—	March 27, 2000	Kitt Peak	Spacewatch	HOF	3.6 km	MPC · JPL
168678	2000 FC_{5}	—	March 27, 2000	Kitt Peak	Spacewatch	·	3.4 km	MPC · JPL
168679	2000 FU_{7}	—	March 27, 2000	Socorro	LINEAR	·	7.2 km	MPC · JPL
168680	2000 FU_{12}	—	March 28, 2000	Socorro	LINEAR	·	2.7 km	MPC · JPL
168681	2000 FP_{19}	—	March 29, 2000	Socorro	LINEAR	·	3.4 km	MPC · JPL
168682	2000 FN_{54}	—	March 30, 2000	Kitt Peak	Spacewatch	KOR	2.1 km	MPC · JPL
168683	2000 FE_{69}	—	March 27, 2000	Kitt Peak	Spacewatch	·	3.0 km	MPC · JPL
168684	2000 FD_{72}	—	March 25, 2000	Kitt Peak	Spacewatch	·	5.1 km	MPC · JPL
168685	2000 GM_{12}	—	April 5, 2000	Socorro	LINEAR	THB	7.0 km	MPC · JPL
168686	2000 GH_{19}	—	April 5, 2000	Socorro	LINEAR	HOF	3.8 km	MPC · JPL
168687	2000 GP_{19}	—	April 5, 2000	Socorro	LINEAR	·	2.1 km	MPC · JPL
168688	2000 GN_{29}	—	April 5, 2000	Socorro	LINEAR	·	3.8 km	MPC · JPL
168689	2000 GM_{30}	—	April 5, 2000	Socorro	LINEAR	·	3.0 km	MPC · JPL
168690	2000 GL_{37}	—	April 5, 2000	Socorro	LINEAR	·	3.8 km	MPC · JPL
168691	2000 GT_{46}	—	April 5, 2000	Socorro	LINEAR	·	5.5 km	MPC · JPL
168692	2000 GY_{56}	—	April 5, 2000	Socorro	LINEAR	526	4.4 km	MPC · JPL
168693	2000 GV_{59}	—	April 5, 2000	Socorro	LINEAR	·	3.5 km	MPC · JPL
168694	2000 GN_{66}	—	April 5, 2000	Socorro	LINEAR	·	4.7 km	MPC · JPL
168695	2000 GT_{118}	—	April 3, 2000	Kitt Peak	Spacewatch	NEM	2.8 km	MPC · JPL
168696	2000 GY_{119}	—	April 5, 2000	Kitt Peak	Spacewatch	KOR	1.7 km	MPC · JPL
168697	2000 GQ_{122}	—	April 6, 2000	Bergisch Gladbach	W. Bickel	·	4.1 km	MPC · JPL
168698 Robpickman	2000 GX_{140}	Robpickman	April 5, 2000	Anderson Mesa	Wasserman, L. H.	MRX	1.6 km	MPC · JPL
168699	2000 GO_{144}	—	April 7, 2000	Kitt Peak	Spacewatch	fast	1.5 km	MPC · JPL
168700	2000 GE_{147}	—	April 2, 2000	Mauna Kea	D. C. Jewitt, C. A. Trujillo, S. S. Sheppard	plutino	109 km	MPC · JPL

== 168701–168800 ==
back to top

Designation			Discovery			Properties		Ref
Permanent	Provisional	Named after	Date	Site	Discoverer(s)	Category	Diam.	Ref
168701	2000 GU_{159}	—	April 7, 2000	Socorro	LINEAR	·	4.3 km	MPC · JPL
168702	2000 GC_{175}	—	April 5, 2000	Anderson Mesa	LONEOS	(5)	2.3 km	MPC · JPL
168703	2000 GP_{183}	—	April 2, 2000	Mauna Kea	Mauna Kea	plutino	300 km	MPC · JPL
168704	2000 GA_{186}	—	April 3, 2000	Kitt Peak	Spacewatch	THM	3.8 km	MPC · JPL
168705	2000 HN	—	April 24, 2000	Kitt Peak	Spacewatch	·	2.8 km	MPC · JPL
168706	2000 HE_{1}	—	April 24, 2000	Kitt Peak	Spacewatch	THM	3.0 km	MPC · JPL
168707	2000 HR_{6}	—	April 24, 2000	Kitt Peak	Spacewatch	·	4.1 km	MPC · JPL
168708	2000 HJ_{10}	—	April 27, 2000	Socorro	LINEAR	·	5.5 km	MPC · JPL
168709	2000 HS_{34}	—	April 25, 2000	Anderson Mesa	LONEOS	GEF	2.1 km	MPC · JPL
168710	2000 HE_{41}	—	April 28, 2000	Socorro	LINEAR	·	2.0 km	MPC · JPL
168711	2000 HM_{74}	—	April 30, 2000	Haleakala	NEAT	·	3.5 km	MPC · JPL
168712	2000 HY_{79}	—	April 28, 2000	Anderson Mesa	LONEOS	GAL	2.9 km	MPC · JPL
168713	2000 HN_{86}	—	April 30, 2000	Anderson Mesa	LONEOS	·	1.3 km	MPC · JPL
168714	2000 JQ_{10}	—	May 7, 2000	Socorro	LINEAR	·	1.1 km	MPC · JPL
168715	2000 JF_{16}	—	May 5, 2000	Socorro	LINEAR	·	4.3 km	MPC · JPL
168716	2000 JK_{41}	—	May 7, 2000	Socorro	LINEAR	TIR	4.0 km	MPC · JPL
168717	2000 JP_{59}	—	May 7, 2000	Socorro	LINEAR	·	3.8 km	MPC · JPL
168718	2000 JM_{73}	—	May 2, 2000	Anderson Mesa	LONEOS	·	3.9 km	MPC · JPL
168719	2000 KF_{7}	—	May 27, 2000	Socorro	LINEAR	EOS	3.5 km	MPC · JPL
168720	2000 KB_{12}	—	May 28, 2000	Socorro	LINEAR	·	4.4 km	MPC · JPL
168721	2000 KB_{45}	—	May 29, 2000	Kitt Peak	Spacewatch	·	4.1 km	MPC · JPL
168722	2000 LH	—	June 1, 2000	Prescott	P. G. Comba	·	2.9 km	MPC · JPL
168723	2000 OR_{9}	—	July 31, 2000	Črni Vrh	Skvarč, J.	·	1.1 km	MPC · JPL
168724	2000 OG_{10}	—	July 23, 2000	Socorro	LINEAR	·	7.4 km	MPC · JPL
168725	2000 OH_{16}	—	July 23, 2000	Socorro	LINEAR	·	1.3 km	MPC · JPL
168726	2000 OP_{29}	—	July 30, 2000	Socorro	LINEAR	·	1.5 km	MPC · JPL
168727	2000 OJ_{30}	—	July 30, 2000	Socorro	LINEAR	·	1.2 km	MPC · JPL
168728	2000 OZ_{33}	—	July 30, 2000	Socorro	LINEAR	·	1.4 km	MPC · JPL
168729	2000 OA_{44}	—	July 30, 2000	Socorro	LINEAR	·	970 m	MPC · JPL
168730	2000 OX_{51}	—	July 30, 2000	Socorro	LINEAR	·	1.1 km	MPC · JPL
168731	2000 OF_{55}	—	July 29, 2000	Anderson Mesa	LONEOS	·	1.2 km	MPC · JPL
168732	2000 OT_{55}	—	July 29, 2000	Anderson Mesa	LONEOS	·	990 m	MPC · JPL
168733	2000 PD_{2}	—	August 1, 2000	Socorro	LINEAR	·	2.8 km	MPC · JPL
168734	2000 PB_{28}	—	August 4, 2000	Haleakala	NEAT	·	1.1 km	MPC · JPL
168735	2000 QX_{7}	—	August 25, 2000	Farra d'Isonzo	Farra d'Isonzo	·	1.1 km	MPC · JPL
168736	2000 QF_{22}	—	August 24, 2000	Socorro	LINEAR	·	1.2 km	MPC · JPL
168737	2000 QT_{32}	—	August 26, 2000	Socorro	LINEAR	·	1.5 km	MPC · JPL
168738	2000 QN_{47}	—	August 24, 2000	Socorro	LINEAR	·	1.4 km	MPC · JPL
168739	2000 QG_{57}	—	August 26, 2000	Socorro	LINEAR	·	1.4 km	MPC · JPL
168740	2000 QG_{81}	—	August 24, 2000	Socorro	LINEAR	·	1.4 km	MPC · JPL
168741	2000 QZ_{88}	—	August 25, 2000	Socorro	LINEAR	·	1.3 km	MPC · JPL
168742	2000 QY_{92}	—	August 25, 2000	Socorro	LINEAR	·	1.9 km	MPC · JPL
168743	2000 QO_{97}	—	August 28, 2000	Socorro	LINEAR	·	1.6 km	MPC · JPL
168744	2000 QB_{102}	—	August 28, 2000	Socorro	LINEAR	·	1.2 km	MPC · JPL
168745	2000 QJ_{102}	—	August 28, 2000	Socorro	LINEAR	·	1.5 km	MPC · JPL
168746	2000 QY_{118}	—	August 25, 2000	Socorro	LINEAR	·	1.4 km	MPC · JPL
168747	2000 QY_{121}	—	August 25, 2000	Socorro	LINEAR	·	1.7 km	MPC · JPL
168748	2000 QB_{124}	—	August 25, 2000	Socorro	LINEAR	(883)	1.7 km	MPC · JPL
168749	2000 QA_{158}	—	August 31, 2000	Socorro	LINEAR	·	8.2 km	MPC · JPL
168750	2000 QZ_{162}	—	August 31, 2000	Socorro	LINEAR	EOS	3.5 km	MPC · JPL
168751	2000 QP_{174}	—	August 31, 2000	Socorro	LINEAR	·	1.2 km	MPC · JPL
168752	2000 QQ_{174}	—	August 31, 2000	Socorro	LINEAR	·	5.8 km	MPC · JPL
168753	2000 QE_{185}	—	August 26, 2000	Socorro	LINEAR	·	1.1 km	MPC · JPL
168754	2000 QM_{190}	—	August 26, 2000	Socorro	LINEAR	·	1.4 km	MPC · JPL
168755	2000 QY_{190}	—	August 26, 2000	Socorro	LINEAR	·	1.3 km	MPC · JPL
168756	2000 QJ_{199}	—	August 29, 2000	Socorro	LINEAR	·	1.2 km	MPC · JPL
168757	2000 QV_{200}	—	August 29, 2000	Socorro	LINEAR	·	1.3 km	MPC · JPL
168758	2000 QH_{202}	—	August 29, 2000	Socorro	LINEAR	·	1.2 km	MPC · JPL
168759	2000 QM_{206}	—	August 31, 2000	Socorro	LINEAR	·	1.2 km	MPC · JPL
168760	2000 QB_{212}	—	August 31, 2000	Socorro	LINEAR	·	2.0 km	MPC · JPL
168761	2000 QQ_{212}	—	August 31, 2000	Socorro	LINEAR	·	1.5 km	MPC · JPL
168762	2000 QG_{215}	—	August 31, 2000	Socorro	LINEAR	·	1.1 km	MPC · JPL
168763	2000 QM_{215}	—	August 31, 2000	Socorro	LINEAR	·	1.1 km	MPC · JPL
168764	2000 QH_{220}	—	August 21, 2000	Anderson Mesa	LONEOS	·	1.3 km	MPC · JPL
168765	2000 QH_{223}	—	August 21, 2000	Anderson Mesa	LONEOS	·	2.8 km	MPC · JPL
168766	2000 QF_{224}	—	August 26, 2000	Socorro	LINEAR	·	1.3 km	MPC · JPL
168767 Kochte	2000 QZ_{244}	Kochte	August 25, 2000	Cerro Tololo	M. W. Buie	·	1.1 km	MPC · JPL
168768	2000 RN_{15}	—	September 1, 2000	Socorro	LINEAR	·	1.3 km	MPC · JPL
168769	2000 RO_{16}	—	September 1, 2000	Socorro	LINEAR	·	1.2 km	MPC · JPL
168770	2000 RD_{17}	—	September 1, 2000	Socorro	LINEAR	·	1.3 km	MPC · JPL
168771	2000 RM_{19}	—	September 1, 2000	Socorro	LINEAR	V	1.1 km	MPC · JPL
168772	2000 RW_{21}	—	September 1, 2000	Socorro	LINEAR	·	1.4 km	MPC · JPL
168773	2000 RA_{22}	—	September 1, 2000	Socorro	LINEAR	·	1.5 km	MPC · JPL
168774	2000 RC_{28}	—	September 1, 2000	Socorro	LINEAR	·	1.2 km	MPC · JPL
168775	2000 RD_{30}	—	September 1, 2000	Socorro	LINEAR	·	1.1 km	MPC · JPL
168776	2000 RU_{30}	—	September 1, 2000	Socorro	LINEAR	·	1.4 km	MPC · JPL
168777	2000 RD_{37}	—	September 3, 2000	Socorro	LINEAR	PHO	1.9 km	MPC · JPL
168778	2000 RK_{48}	—	September 3, 2000	Socorro	LINEAR	·	1.9 km	MPC · JPL
168779	2000 RX_{48}	—	September 3, 2000	Socorro	LINEAR	·	2.1 km	MPC · JPL
168780	2000 RN_{52}	—	September 4, 2000	Kitt Peak	Spacewatch	·	1.3 km	MPC · JPL
168781	2000 RO_{59}	—	September 7, 2000	Kitt Peak	Spacewatch	·	1.2 km	MPC · JPL
168782	2000 RN_{63}	—	September 3, 2000	Socorro	LINEAR	·	1.8 km	MPC · JPL
168783	2000 RB_{104}	—	September 6, 2000	Socorro	LINEAR	V	1.1 km	MPC · JPL
168784	2000 SQ_{2}	—	September 20, 2000	Socorro	LINEAR	·	1.8 km	MPC · JPL
168785	2000 SS_{7}	—	September 22, 2000	Kitt Peak	Spacewatch	·	1.3 km	MPC · JPL
168786	2000 SK_{11}	—	September 24, 2000	Socorro	LINEAR	PHO	3.3 km	MPC · JPL
168787	2000 SE_{22}	—	September 19, 2000	Haleakala	NEAT	·	1.1 km	MPC · JPL
168788	2000 SN_{28}	—	September 23, 2000	Socorro	LINEAR	·	1.1 km	MPC · JPL
168789	2000 SF_{33}	—	September 24, 2000	Socorro	LINEAR	·	1 km	MPC · JPL
168790	2000 SR_{36}	—	September 24, 2000	Socorro	LINEAR	·	1.2 km	MPC · JPL
168791	2000 SQ_{43}	—	September 25, 2000	Haleakala	NEAT	AMO	600 m	MPC · JPL
168792	2000 ST_{56}	—	September 24, 2000	Socorro	LINEAR	·	950 m	MPC · JPL
168793	2000 SS_{57}	—	September 24, 2000	Socorro	LINEAR	CYB	7.0 km	MPC · JPL
168794	2000 SV_{63}	—	September 24, 2000	Socorro	LINEAR	·	4.2 km	MPC · JPL
168795	2000 SU_{70}	—	September 24, 2000	Socorro	LINEAR	NYS	1.4 km	MPC · JPL
168796	2000 SC_{76}	—	September 24, 2000	Socorro	LINEAR	·	1.6 km	MPC · JPL
168797	2000 SS_{79}	—	September 24, 2000	Socorro	LINEAR	·	1.1 km	MPC · JPL
168798	2000 SK_{88}	—	September 24, 2000	Socorro	LINEAR	V	750 m	MPC · JPL
168799	2000 SL_{93}	—	September 23, 2000	Socorro	LINEAR	EOS	3.3 km	MPC · JPL
168800	2000 SW_{93}	—	September 23, 2000	Socorro	LINEAR	·	1.2 km	MPC · JPL

== 168801–168900 ==
back to top

Designation			Discovery			Properties		Ref
Permanent	Provisional	Named after	Date	Site	Discoverer(s)	Category	Diam.	Ref
168801	2000 SM_{109}	—	September 24, 2000	Socorro	LINEAR	·	1.0 km	MPC · JPL
168802	2000 ST_{110}	—	September 24, 2000	Socorro	LINEAR	·	2.6 km	MPC · JPL
168803	2000 SG_{118}	—	September 24, 2000	Socorro	LINEAR	·	1.4 km	MPC · JPL
168804	2000 SF_{134}	—	September 23, 2000	Socorro	LINEAR	·	1.4 km	MPC · JPL
168805	2000 SN_{137}	—	September 23, 2000	Socorro	LINEAR	·	2.7 km	MPC · JPL
168806	2000 SV_{137}	—	September 23, 2000	Socorro	LINEAR	·	1.5 km	MPC · JPL
168807	2000 SE_{146}	—	September 24, 2000	Socorro	LINEAR	·	1.3 km	MPC · JPL
168808	2000 SD_{147}	—	September 24, 2000	Socorro	LINEAR	·	1.2 km	MPC · JPL
168809	2000 SZ_{168}	—	September 23, 2000	Socorro	LINEAR	·	1.2 km	MPC · JPL
168810	2000 SR_{174}	—	September 28, 2000	Socorro	LINEAR	·	4.2 km	MPC · JPL
168811	2000 SE_{184}	—	September 20, 2000	Kitt Peak	Spacewatch	V	1.2 km	MPC · JPL
168812	2000 SA_{189}	—	September 22, 2000	Kitt Peak	Spacewatch	·	1.4 km	MPC · JPL
168813	2000 SC_{189}	—	September 22, 2000	Kitt Peak	Spacewatch	·	1.5 km	MPC · JPL
168814	2000 SX_{219}	—	September 26, 2000	Socorro	LINEAR	V	1.5 km	MPC · JPL
168815	2000 ST_{220}	—	September 26, 2000	Socorro	LINEAR	·	1.6 km	MPC · JPL
168816	2000 SR_{224}	—	September 27, 2000	Socorro	LINEAR	·	1.6 km	MPC · JPL
168817	2000 SD_{255}	—	September 24, 2000	Socorro	LINEAR	·	1.4 km	MPC · JPL
168818	2000 SF_{263}	—	September 25, 2000	Socorro	LINEAR	·	1.4 km	MPC · JPL
168819	2000 SC_{265}	—	September 26, 2000	Socorro	LINEAR	·	1.5 km	MPC · JPL
168820	2000 SK_{266}	—	September 26, 2000	Socorro	LINEAR	(2076)	1.3 km	MPC · JPL
168821	2000 SH_{270}	—	September 27, 2000	Socorro	LINEAR	·	1.1 km	MPC · JPL
168822	2000 SL_{270}	—	September 27, 2000	Socorro	LINEAR	NYS	1.3 km	MPC · JPL
168823	2000 SN_{271}	—	September 27, 2000	Socorro	LINEAR	·	1.5 km	MPC · JPL
168824	2000 SE_{274}	—	September 28, 2000	Socorro	LINEAR	·	1.1 km	MPC · JPL
168825	2000 SX_{288}	—	September 27, 2000	Socorro	LINEAR	·	1.1 km	MPC · JPL
168826	2000 SB_{291}	—	September 27, 2000	Socorro	LINEAR	·	1.2 km	MPC · JPL
168827	2000 SY_{308}	—	September 30, 2000	Socorro	LINEAR	·	1.6 km	MPC · JPL
168828	2000 SY_{320}	—	September 29, 2000	Mauna Kea	D. J. Tholen	·	1.9 km	MPC · JPL
168829	2000 SF_{322}	—	September 28, 2000	Kitt Peak	Spacewatch	·	990 m	MPC · JPL
168830	2000 SK_{334}	—	September 26, 2000	Haleakala	NEAT	·	1.2 km	MPC · JPL
168831	2000 SZ_{334}	—	September 26, 2000	Haleakala	NEAT	·	1.4 km	MPC · JPL
168832	2000 SD_{340}	—	September 24, 2000	Socorro	LINEAR	·	1.5 km	MPC · JPL
168833	2000 SP_{343}	—	September 23, 2000	Socorro	LINEAR	·	1.3 km	MPC · JPL
168834	2000 SB_{352}	—	September 26, 2000	Anderson Mesa	LONEOS	·	1.5 km	MPC · JPL
168835	2000 SD_{364}	—	September 20, 2000	Socorro	LINEAR	·	900 m	MPC · JPL
168836	2000 SH_{364}	—	September 20, 2000	Socorro	LINEAR	·	5.0 km	MPC · JPL
168837	2000 TZ_{36}	—	October 1, 2000	Socorro	LINEAR	CYB	7.6 km	MPC · JPL
168838	2000 TB_{40}	—	October 1, 2000	Socorro	LINEAR	·	1.2 km	MPC · JPL
168839	2000 TX_{48}	—	October 1, 2000	Anderson Mesa	LONEOS	·	2.1 km	MPC · JPL
168840	2000 TF_{58}	—	October 2, 2000	Socorro	LINEAR	·	1.0 km	MPC · JPL
168841	2000 TB_{63}	—	October 2, 2000	Kitt Peak	Spacewatch	·	1.1 km	MPC · JPL
168842	2000 UP	—	October 20, 2000	Ondřejov	P. Kušnirák	·	1.8 km	MPC · JPL
168843	2000 UG_{4}	—	October 24, 2000	Socorro	LINEAR	·	1.4 km	MPC · JPL
168844	2000 UX_{19}	—	October 24, 2000	Socorro	LINEAR	NYS	1.4 km	MPC · JPL
168845	2000 UJ_{28}	—	October 25, 2000	Socorro	LINEAR	·	1.2 km	MPC · JPL
168846	2000 UQ_{34}	—	October 24, 2000	Socorro	LINEAR	·	970 m	MPC · JPL
168847	2000 UU_{34}	—	October 24, 2000	Socorro	LINEAR	·	1.4 km	MPC · JPL
168848	2000 UD_{47}	—	October 24, 2000	Socorro	LINEAR	NYS	1.9 km	MPC · JPL
168849	2000 UK_{51}	—	October 24, 2000	Socorro	LINEAR	·	1.1 km	MPC · JPL
168850	2000 UN_{63}	—	October 25, 2000	Socorro	LINEAR	·	1.1 km	MPC · JPL
168851	2000 UQ_{67}	—	October 25, 2000	Socorro	LINEAR	V	1.1 km	MPC · JPL
168852	2000 UV_{71}	—	October 25, 2000	Socorro	LINEAR	·	1.6 km	MPC · JPL
168853	2000 UV_{76}	—	October 24, 2000	Socorro	LINEAR	·	1.6 km	MPC · JPL
168854	2000 UP_{84}	—	October 31, 2000	Socorro	LINEAR	·	1.6 km	MPC · JPL
168855	2000 UC_{90}	—	October 24, 2000	Socorro	LINEAR	·	1.6 km	MPC · JPL
168856	2000 UY_{101}	—	October 25, 2000	Socorro	LINEAR	·	2.8 km	MPC · JPL
168857	2000 UA_{102}	—	October 25, 2000	Socorro	LINEAR	·	1.0 km	MPC · JPL
168858	2000 VN_{8}	—	November 1, 2000	Socorro	LINEAR	·	1.3 km	MPC · JPL
168859	2000 VG_{18}	—	November 1, 2000	Socorro	LINEAR	·	2.0 km	MPC · JPL
168860	2000 VH_{21}	—	November 1, 2000	Socorro	LINEAR	·	2.1 km	MPC · JPL
168861	2000 VM_{22}	—	November 1, 2000	Socorro	LINEAR	V	990 m	MPC · JPL
168862	2000 VS_{22}	—	November 1, 2000	Socorro	LINEAR	·	1.4 km	MPC · JPL
168863	2000 VW_{24}	—	November 1, 2000	Socorro	LINEAR	NYS	1.4 km	MPC · JPL
168864	2000 VW_{25}	—	November 1, 2000	Socorro	LINEAR	·	1.6 km	MPC · JPL
168865	2000 VX_{41}	—	November 1, 2000	Socorro	LINEAR	·	1.1 km	MPC · JPL
168866	2000 VR_{42}	—	November 1, 2000	Socorro	LINEAR	·	1.3 km	MPC · JPL
168867	2000 VP_{44}	—	November 2, 2000	Socorro	LINEAR	·	2.6 km	MPC · JPL
168868	2000 VV_{52}	—	November 3, 2000	Socorro	LINEAR	·	1.8 km	MPC · JPL
168869	2000 WS_{4}	—	November 19, 2000	Socorro	LINEAR	V	1.1 km	MPC · JPL
168870	2000 WN_{6}	—	November 20, 2000	Socorro	LINEAR	·	1.5 km	MPC · JPL
168871	2000 WB_{9}	—	November 18, 2000	Bisei SG Center	BATTeRS	·	1.7 km	MPC · JPL
168872	2000 WZ_{9}	—	November 22, 2000	Kitt Peak	Spacewatch	·	1.8 km	MPC · JPL
168873	2000 WC_{14}	—	November 20, 2000	Socorro	LINEAR	·	1.6 km	MPC · JPL
168874	2000 WA_{15}	—	November 20, 2000	Socorro	LINEAR	·	1.7 km	MPC · JPL
168875	2000 WQ_{22}	—	November 20, 2000	Socorro	LINEAR	·	1.5 km	MPC · JPL
168876	2000 WZ_{24}	—	November 20, 2000	Socorro	LINEAR	slow	2.7 km	MPC · JPL
168877	2000 WC_{27}	—	November 26, 2000	Desert Beaver	W. K. Y. Yeung	·	1.4 km	MPC · JPL
168878	2000 WV_{28}	—	November 26, 2000	Bohyunsan	Jeon, Y.-B., Lee, B.-C.	·	1.3 km	MPC · JPL
168879	2000 WD_{34}	—	November 20, 2000	Socorro	LINEAR	·	2.1 km	MPC · JPL
168880	2000 WJ_{48}	—	November 21, 2000	Socorro	LINEAR	·	1.2 km	MPC · JPL
168881	2000 WN_{48}	—	November 21, 2000	Socorro	LINEAR	·	1.6 km	MPC · JPL
168882	2000 WZ_{56}	—	November 21, 2000	Socorro	LINEAR	·	1.2 km	MPC · JPL
168883	2000 WL_{57}	—	November 21, 2000	Socorro	LINEAR	·	2.3 km	MPC · JPL
168884	2000 WB_{71}	—	November 19, 2000	Socorro	LINEAR	·	2.1 km	MPC · JPL
168885	2000 WO_{76}	—	November 20, 2000	Socorro	LINEAR	·	1.2 km	MPC · JPL
168886	2000 WH_{78}	—	November 20, 2000	Socorro	LINEAR	·	1.4 km	MPC · JPL
168887	2000 WB_{83}	—	November 20, 2000	Socorro	LINEAR	·	2.2 km	MPC · JPL
168888	2000 WH_{90}	—	November 21, 2000	Socorro	LINEAR	·	2.4 km	MPC · JPL
168889	2000 WM_{95}	—	November 21, 2000	Socorro	LINEAR	·	1.5 km	MPC · JPL
168890	2000 WK_{116}	—	November 20, 2000	Socorro	LINEAR	slow	2.0 km	MPC · JPL
168891	2000 WO_{122}	—	November 29, 2000	Socorro	LINEAR	·	1.9 km	MPC · JPL
168892	2000 WK_{124}	—	November 19, 2000	Socorro	LINEAR	PHO	1.5 km	MPC · JPL
168893	2000 WS_{128}	—	November 18, 2000	Kitt Peak	Spacewatch	NYS	1.5 km	MPC · JPL
168894	2000 WE_{130}	—	November 19, 2000	Kitt Peak	Spacewatch	·	1.9 km	MPC · JPL
168895	2000 WE_{131}	—	November 20, 2000	Anderson Mesa	LONEOS	·	2.0 km	MPC · JPL
168896	2000 WC_{134}	—	November 19, 2000	Socorro	LINEAR	·	1.6 km	MPC · JPL
168897	2000 WA_{136}	—	November 20, 2000	Socorro	LINEAR	·	1.3 km	MPC · JPL
168898	2000 WQ_{137}	—	November 20, 2000	Socorro	LINEAR	·	2.8 km	MPC · JPL
168899	2000 WV_{147}	—	November 28, 2000	Kitt Peak	Spacewatch	·	1.2 km	MPC · JPL
168900	2000 WW_{160}	—	November 20, 2000	Anderson Mesa	LONEOS	·	2.6 km	MPC · JPL

== 168901–169000 ==
back to top

Designation			Discovery			Properties		Ref
Permanent	Provisional	Named after	Date	Site	Discoverer(s)	Category	Diam.	Ref
168901	2000 WJ_{164}	—	November 21, 2000	Haleakala	NEAT	PHO	1.5 km	MPC · JPL
168902	2000 WR_{166}	—	November 24, 2000	Anderson Mesa	LONEOS	·	1.0 km	MPC · JPL
168903	2000 WW_{188}	—	November 18, 2000	Anderson Mesa	LONEOS	·	1.2 km	MPC · JPL
168904	2000 WY_{189}	—	November 18, 2000	Anderson Mesa	LONEOS	NYS	1.1 km	MPC · JPL
168905	2000 XT_{1}	—	December 3, 2000	Kitt Peak	Spacewatch	·	1.8 km	MPC · JPL
168906	2000 XE_{12}	—	December 4, 2000	Socorro	LINEAR	·	1.6 km	MPC · JPL
168907	2000 XN_{19}	—	December 4, 2000	Socorro	LINEAR	V	970 m	MPC · JPL
168908	2000 XH_{21}	—	December 4, 2000	Socorro	LINEAR	V	1.0 km	MPC · JPL
168909	2000 XV_{30}	—	December 4, 2000	Socorro	LINEAR	·	2.2 km	MPC · JPL
168910	2000 XC_{52}	—	December 6, 2000	Socorro	LINEAR	·	1.4 km	MPC · JPL
168911	2000 XM_{53}	—	December 14, 2000	Bohyunsan	Jeon, Y.-B., Lee, B.-C.	·	2.0 km	MPC · JPL
168912	2000 YV_{2}	—	December 20, 2000	Socorro	LINEAR	·	2.6 km	MPC · JPL
168913	2000 YA_{3}	—	December 18, 2000	Kitt Peak	Spacewatch	V	990 m	MPC · JPL
168914	2000 YU_{21}	—	December 27, 2000	Desert Beaver	W. K. Y. Yeung	·	2.0 km	MPC · JPL
168915	2000 YW_{37}	—	December 30, 2000	Socorro	LINEAR	·	1.6 km	MPC · JPL
168916	2000 YZ_{42}	—	December 30, 2000	Socorro	LINEAR	·	2.3 km	MPC · JPL
168917	2000 YM_{44}	—	December 30, 2000	Socorro	LINEAR	NYS	2.2 km	MPC · JPL
168918	2000 YX_{44}	—	December 30, 2000	Socorro	LINEAR	NYS	1.9 km	MPC · JPL
168919	2000 YR_{49}	—	December 30, 2000	Socorro	LINEAR	NYS	1.7 km	MPC · JPL
168920	2000 YK_{50}	—	December 30, 2000	Socorro	LINEAR	·	1.7 km	MPC · JPL
168921	2000 YT_{53}	—	December 30, 2000	Socorro	LINEAR	·	2.2 km	MPC · JPL
168922	2000 YL_{55}	—	December 30, 2000	Socorro	LINEAR	·	1.5 km	MPC · JPL
168923	2000 YU_{56}	—	December 30, 2000	Socorro	LINEAR	·	2.1 km	MPC · JPL
168924	2000 YE_{59}	—	December 30, 2000	Socorro	LINEAR	·	1.8 km	MPC · JPL
168925	2000 YV_{59}	—	December 30, 2000	Socorro	LINEAR	V	1.0 km	MPC · JPL
168926	2000 YN_{65}	—	December 16, 2000	Kitt Peak	Spacewatch	·	2.3 km	MPC · JPL
168927	2000 YD_{68}	—	December 28, 2000	Socorro	LINEAR	PHO	2.2 km	MPC · JPL
168928	2000 YG_{71}	—	December 30, 2000	Socorro	LINEAR	·	2.4 km	MPC · JPL
168929	2000 YT_{72}	—	December 30, 2000	Socorro	LINEAR	·	1.4 km	MPC · JPL
168930	2000 YV_{73}	—	December 30, 2000	Socorro	LINEAR	·	1.3 km	MPC · JPL
168931	2000 YL_{82}	—	December 30, 2000	Socorro	LINEAR	·	1.5 km	MPC · JPL
168932	2000 YG_{86}	—	December 30, 2000	Socorro	LINEAR	·	1.5 km	MPC · JPL
168933	2000 YQ_{88}	—	December 30, 2000	Socorro	LINEAR	·	1.5 km	MPC · JPL
168934	2000 YR_{91}	—	December 30, 2000	Socorro	LINEAR	·	1.2 km	MPC · JPL
168935	2000 YC_{95}	—	December 30, 2000	Socorro	LINEAR	NYS	1.8 km	MPC · JPL
168936	2000 YN_{95}	—	December 30, 2000	Socorro	LINEAR	CLA	3.0 km	MPC · JPL
168937	2000 YU_{95}	—	December 30, 2000	Socorro	LINEAR	·	1.5 km	MPC · JPL
168938	2000 YS_{107}	—	December 30, 2000	Socorro	LINEAR	NYS	1.6 km	MPC · JPL
168939	2000 YB_{108}	—	December 30, 2000	Socorro	LINEAR	·	1.9 km	MPC · JPL
168940	2000 YL_{109}	—	December 30, 2000	Socorro	LINEAR	NYS	2.0 km	MPC · JPL
168941	2000 YO_{111}	—	December 30, 2000	Socorro	LINEAR	·	1.6 km	MPC · JPL
168942	2000 YL_{114}	—	December 30, 2000	Socorro	LINEAR	·	1.7 km	MPC · JPL
168943	2000 YG_{118}	—	December 30, 2000	Socorro	LINEAR	·	1.3 km	MPC · JPL
168944	2000 YK_{126}	—	December 29, 2000	Anderson Mesa	LONEOS	·	5.3 km	MPC · JPL
168945	2000 YN_{131}	—	December 30, 2000	Desert Beaver	W. K. Y. Yeung	·	1.3 km	MPC · JPL
168946	2000 YY_{135}	—	December 22, 2000	Socorro	LINEAR	·	1.6 km	MPC · JPL
168947	2000 YB_{139}	—	December 27, 2000	Kitt Peak	Spacewatch	·	2.6 km	MPC · JPL
168948 Silvestri	2000 YX_{143}	Silvestri	December 23, 2000	Apache Point	SDSS	·	2.4 km	MPC · JPL
168949	2001 AV_{18}	—	January 4, 2001	Haleakala	NEAT	·	1.2 km	MPC · JPL
168950	2001 AA_{26}	—	January 2, 2001	Socorro	LINEAR	·	3.0 km	MPC · JPL
168951	2001 AL_{33}	—	January 4, 2001	Socorro	LINEAR	·	1.8 km	MPC · JPL
168952	2001 AN_{39}	—	January 2, 2001	Kitt Peak	Spacewatch	NYS	1.6 km	MPC · JPL
168953	2001 AZ_{43}	—	January 14, 2001	Kitt Peak	Spacewatch	·	1.9 km	MPC · JPL
168954	2001 AT_{44}	—	January 15, 2001	Oizumi	T. Kobayashi	·	2.4 km	MPC · JPL
168955	2001 AV_{44}	—	January 15, 2001	Oizumi	T. Kobayashi	ERI	2.5 km	MPC · JPL
168956	2001 AC_{47}	—	January 15, 2001	Socorro	LINEAR	·	2.7 km	MPC · JPL
168957	2001 AB_{52}	—	January 5, 2001	Socorro	LINEAR	·	2.0 km	MPC · JPL
168958	2001 AC_{52}	—	January 5, 2001	Socorro	LINEAR	·	1.8 km	MPC · JPL
168959	2001 BP_{6}	—	January 19, 2001	Socorro	LINEAR	·	2.8 km	MPC · JPL
168960	2001 BQ_{19}	—	January 19, 2001	Socorro	LINEAR	·	6.2 km	MPC · JPL
168961	2001 BF_{23}	—	January 20, 2001	Socorro	LINEAR	·	1.8 km	MPC · JPL
168962	2001 BK_{27}	—	January 20, 2001	Socorro	LINEAR	NYS	1.8 km	MPC · JPL
168963	2001 BT_{32}	—	January 20, 2001	Socorro	LINEAR	NYS	1.9 km	MPC · JPL
168964	2001 BF_{36}	—	January 19, 2001	Socorro	LINEAR	MAS	1.8 km	MPC · JPL
168965	2001 BL_{37}	—	January 21, 2001	Socorro	LINEAR	·	1.6 km	MPC · JPL
168966	2001 BC_{38}	—	January 21, 2001	Socorro	LINEAR	·	2.3 km	MPC · JPL
168967	2001 BB_{43}	—	January 19, 2001	Socorro	LINEAR	·	4.0 km	MPC · JPL
168968	2001 BY_{45}	—	January 21, 2001	Socorro	LINEAR	·	3.5 km	MPC · JPL
168969	2001 BX_{55}	—	January 19, 2001	Socorro	LINEAR	NYS	1.9 km	MPC · JPL
168970	2001 BT_{56}	—	January 19, 2001	Kitt Peak	Spacewatch	V	1.0 km	MPC · JPL
168971	2001 BA_{58}	—	January 21, 2001	Socorro	LINEAR	NYS	1.7 km	MPC · JPL
168972	2001 BL_{59}	—	January 26, 2001	Socorro	LINEAR	·	3.5 km	MPC · JPL
168973	2001 BQ_{64}	—	January 30, 2001	Socorro	LINEAR	·	1.9 km	MPC · JPL
168974	2001 BD_{65}	—	January 26, 2001	Socorro	LINEAR	·	5.7 km	MPC · JPL
168975	2001 BO_{66}	—	January 26, 2001	Socorro	LINEAR	·	2.2 km	MPC · JPL
168976	2001 BE_{68}	—	January 31, 2001	Socorro	LINEAR	NYS	2.3 km	MPC · JPL
168977	2001 BE_{75}	—	January 26, 2001	Kitt Peak	Spacewatch	·	1.7 km	MPC · JPL
168978	2001 BO_{75}	—	January 26, 2001	Kitt Peak	Spacewatch	NYS	2.0 km	MPC · JPL
168979	2001 CS_{1}	—	February 1, 2001	Socorro	LINEAR	·	2.1 km	MPC · JPL
168980	2001 CS_{2}	—	February 1, 2001	Socorro	LINEAR	·	1.6 km	MPC · JPL
168981	2001 CT_{3}	—	February 1, 2001	Socorro	LINEAR	·	2.7 km	MPC · JPL
168982	2001 CC_{9}	—	February 1, 2001	Socorro	LINEAR	NYS	1.9 km	MPC · JPL
168983	2001 CV_{11}	—	February 1, 2001	Socorro	LINEAR	·	1.3 km	MPC · JPL
168984	2001 CQ_{14}	—	February 1, 2001	Socorro	LINEAR	·	1.4 km	MPC · JPL
168985	2001 CC_{18}	—	February 2, 2001	Socorro	LINEAR	NYS	1.7 km	MPC · JPL
168986	2001 CV_{22}	—	February 1, 2001	Anderson Mesa	LONEOS	ERI	2.1 km	MPC · JPL
168987	2001 CE_{25}	—	February 1, 2001	Socorro	LINEAR	·	2.4 km	MPC · JPL
168988	2001 CF_{25}	—	February 1, 2001	Socorro	LINEAR	MAS	1.3 km	MPC · JPL
168989	2001 CH_{29}	—	February 2, 2001	Anderson Mesa	LONEOS	·	2.5 km	MPC · JPL
168990	2001 CO_{30}	—	February 2, 2001	Haleakala	NEAT	V	1.4 km	MPC · JPL
168991	2001 CO_{38}	—	February 13, 2001	Socorro	LINEAR	PHO	3.5 km	MPC · JPL
168992	2001 CR_{39}	—	February 13, 2001	Socorro	LINEAR	PHO	1.4 km	MPC · JPL
168993	2001 CH_{40}	—	February 13, 2001	Socorro	LINEAR	V	1.3 km	MPC · JPL
168994	2001 CZ_{47}	—	February 12, 2001	Anderson Mesa	LONEOS	·	2.4 km	MPC · JPL
168995	2001 DV_{4}	—	February 16, 2001	Socorro	LINEAR	·	2.5 km	MPC · JPL
168996	2001 DK_{6}	—	February 16, 2001	Socorro	LINEAR	·	2.6 km	MPC · JPL
168997	2001 DP_{19}	—	February 16, 2001	Socorro	LINEAR	JUN	1.8 km	MPC · JPL
168998	2001 DA_{25}	—	February 17, 2001	Socorro	LINEAR	NYS	1.7 km	MPC · JPL
168999	2001 DR_{26}	—	February 17, 2001	Socorro	LINEAR	NYS	2.0 km	MPC · JPL
169000	2001 DA_{30}	—	February 17, 2001	Socorro	LINEAR	·	2.6 km	MPC · JPL

back to top

== See also ==
- Meanings of minor-planet names: 168001–169000
