= List of minor planets: 170001–171000 =

The following is a partial list of minor planets, running from minor-planet number 170001 through 171000, inclusive. The primary data for this and other partial lists is based on JPL's "Small-Body Orbital Elements" and data available from the Minor Planet Center. Critical list information is also provided by the MPC, unless otherwise specified from Lowell Observatory. A detailed description of the table's columns and additional sources are given on the main page including a complete list of every page in this series, and a statistical break-up on the dynamical classification of minor planets.

Also see the summary list of all named bodies in numerical and alphabetical order, and the corresponding naming citations for the number range of this particular list. New namings may only be added to this list after official publication, as the preannouncement of names is condemned by the Working Group for Small Bodies Nomenclature of the International Astronomical Union.

Near-Earth obj.	MBA (inner)	MBA (outer)	Centaur
Mars-crosser	MBA (middle)	Jupiter trojan	Trans-Neptunian obj.
Unclassified

== 170001–170100 ==
Designation			Discovery			Properties		Ref
Permanent	Provisional	Named after	Date	Site	Discoverer(s)	Category	Diam.	Ref
170001	2002 TS_{283}	—	October 10, 2002	Socorro	LINEAR	(5)	2.2 km	MPC · JPL
170002	2002 TJ_{286}	—	October 10, 2002	Socorro	LINEAR	GEF	2.7 km	MPC · JPL
170003	2002 TT_{286}	—	October 10, 2002	Socorro	LINEAR	·	4.6 km	MPC · JPL
170004	2002 TF_{296}	—	October 11, 2002	Socorro	LINEAR	AGN	1.6 km	MPC · JPL
170005	2002 TR_{296}	—	October 11, 2002	Socorro	LINEAR	·	3.6 km	MPC · JPL
170006 Stoughton	2002 TV_{309}	Stoughton	October 4, 2002	Apache Point	SDSS	·	3.8 km	MPC · JPL
170007 Strateva	2002 TV_{323}	Strateva	October 5, 2002	Apache Point	SDSS	·	2.2 km	MPC · JPL
170008 Michaelstrauss	2002 TZ_{338}	Michaelstrauss	October 5, 2002	Apache Point	SDSS	·	3.1 km	MPC · JPL
170009 Subbarao	2002 TY_{340}	Subbarao	October 5, 2002	Apache Point	SDSS	·	2.5 km	MPC · JPL
170010 Szalay	2002 TJ_{341}	Szalay	October 5, 2002	Apache Point	SDSS	NEM	2.9 km	MPC · JPL
170011 Szkody	2002 TE_{352}	Szkody	October 10, 2002	Apache Point	SDSS	·	3.0 km	MPC · JPL
170012 Anithakar	2002 TF_{359}	Anithakar	October 10, 2002	Apache Point	SDSS	·	3.4 km	MPC · JPL
170013	2002 UO_{3}	—	October 28, 2002	Socorro	LINEAR	T_{j} (2.58) · APO +1km	990 m	MPC · JPL
170014	2002 UZ_{4}	—	October 26, 2002	Haleakala	NEAT	·	2.5 km	MPC · JPL
170015	2002 UE_{8}	—	October 28, 2002	Palomar	NEAT	·	3.7 km	MPC · JPL
170016	2002 UY_{10}	—	October 28, 2002	Kvistaberg	Uppsala-DLR Asteroid Survey	AGN	1.7 km	MPC · JPL
170017	2002 UC_{22}	—	October 30, 2002	Haleakala	NEAT	·	6.4 km	MPC · JPL
170018	2002 UU_{23}	—	October 28, 2002	Palomar	NEAT	·	3.5 km	MPC · JPL
170019	2002 UV_{23}	—	October 28, 2002	Palomar	NEAT	·	4.1 km	MPC · JPL
170020	2002 UW_{23}	—	October 28, 2002	Palomar	NEAT	·	4.0 km	MPC · JPL
170021	2002 UE_{41}	—	October 31, 2002	Palomar	NEAT	·	2.5 km	MPC · JPL
170022 Douglastucker	2002 UO_{66}	Douglastucker	October 30, 2002	Apache Point	SDSS	KOR	1.8 km	MPC · JPL
170023 Vogeley	2002 UR_{68}	Vogeley	October 30, 2002	Apache Point	SDSS	AGN	1.9 km	MPC · JPL
170024	2002 VH	—	November 1, 2002	Socorro	LINEAR	·	3.2 km	MPC · JPL
170025	2002 VO	—	November 2, 2002	Wrightwood	J. W. Young	EOS	2.6 km	MPC · JPL
170026	2002 VV_{2}	—	November 4, 2002	Wrightwood	J. W. Young	·	3.7 km	MPC · JPL
170027	2002 VH_{5}	—	November 5, 2002	Wrightwood	J. W. Young	·	2.8 km	MPC · JPL
170028	2002 VW_{6}	—	November 1, 2002	Palomar	NEAT	·	5.1 km	MPC · JPL
170029	2002 VB_{9}	—	November 1, 2002	Palomar	NEAT	RAF	4.6 km	MPC · JPL
170030	2002 VA_{11}	—	November 1, 2002	Palomar	NEAT	TEL	2.4 km	MPC · JPL
170031	2002 VV_{15}	—	November 5, 2002	Socorro	LINEAR	·	5.6 km	MPC · JPL
170032	2002 VF_{21}	—	November 5, 2002	Socorro	LINEAR	EOS	4.1 km	MPC · JPL
170033	2002 VY_{21}	—	November 5, 2002	Socorro	LINEAR	·	2.9 km	MPC · JPL
170034	2002 VH_{22}	—	November 5, 2002	Socorro	LINEAR	·	3.5 km	MPC · JPL
170035	2002 VG_{28}	—	November 5, 2002	Anderson Mesa	LONEOS	·	3.4 km	MPC · JPL
170036	2002 VA_{31}	—	November 5, 2002	Socorro	LINEAR	·	3.2 km	MPC · JPL
170037	2002 VB_{31}	—	November 5, 2002	Socorro	LINEAR	·	6.7 km	MPC · JPL
170038	2002 VJ_{32}	—	November 5, 2002	Socorro	LINEAR	·	4.7 km	MPC · JPL
170039	2002 VS_{33}	—	November 5, 2002	Socorro	LINEAR	fast	6.9 km	MPC · JPL
170040	2002 VB_{36}	—	November 5, 2002	Kitt Peak	Spacewatch	·	3.1 km	MPC · JPL
170041	2002 VS_{36}	—	November 5, 2002	Anderson Mesa	LONEOS	·	4.8 km	MPC · JPL
170042	2002 VK_{37}	—	November 4, 2002	Palomar	NEAT	WIT	1.5 km	MPC · JPL
170043	2002 VJ_{42}	—	November 5, 2002	Palomar	NEAT	GEF	1.8 km	MPC · JPL
170044	2002 VA_{43}	—	November 4, 2002	Palomar	NEAT	·	5.6 km	MPC · JPL
170045	2002 VO_{47}	—	November 5, 2002	Socorro	LINEAR	·	3.6 km	MPC · JPL
170046	2002 VA_{50}	—	November 5, 2002	Anderson Mesa	LONEOS	·	4.6 km	MPC · JPL
170047	2002 VB_{52}	—	November 6, 2002	Anderson Mesa	LONEOS	·	3.6 km	MPC · JPL
170048	2002 VT_{53}	—	November 6, 2002	Socorro	LINEAR	·	2.6 km	MPC · JPL
170049	2002 VV_{54}	—	November 6, 2002	Anderson Mesa	LONEOS	EOS	3.2 km	MPC · JPL
170050	2002 VY_{54}	—	November 6, 2002	Socorro	LINEAR	·	2.4 km	MPC · JPL
170051	2002 VV_{57}	—	November 6, 2002	Haleakala	NEAT	·	2.7 km	MPC · JPL
170052	2002 VG_{60}	—	November 3, 2002	Haleakala	NEAT	·	3.0 km	MPC · JPL
170053	2002 VH_{65}	—	November 7, 2002	Socorro	LINEAR	AGN	2.2 km	MPC · JPL
170054	2002 VM_{68}	—	November 7, 2002	Socorro	LINEAR	EOS	3.6 km	MPC · JPL
170055	2002 VQ_{73}	—	November 7, 2002	Socorro	LINEAR	ARM	5.8 km	MPC · JPL
170056	2002 VO_{75}	—	November 7, 2002	Socorro	LINEAR	·	5.1 km	MPC · JPL
170057	2002 VB_{80}	—	November 7, 2002	Socorro	LINEAR	·	4.4 km	MPC · JPL
170058	2002 VR_{81}	—	November 7, 2002	Socorro	LINEAR	·	5.7 km	MPC · JPL
170059	2002 VD_{83}	—	November 7, 2002	Socorro	LINEAR	·	4.5 km	MPC · JPL
170060	2002 VP_{83}	—	November 7, 2002	Socorro	LINEAR	·	4.8 km	MPC · JPL
170061	2002 VT_{83}	—	November 7, 2002	Socorro	LINEAR	·	4.4 km	MPC · JPL
170062	2002 VE_{88}	—	November 10, 2002	Socorro	LINEAR	·	5.5 km	MPC · JPL
170063	2002 VP_{92}	—	November 11, 2002	Socorro	LINEAR	·	3.0 km	MPC · JPL
170064	2002 VA_{93}	—	November 11, 2002	Socorro	LINEAR	·	3.4 km	MPC · JPL
170065	2002 VQ_{96}	—	November 11, 2002	Anderson Mesa	LONEOS	EOS	3.6 km	MPC · JPL
170066	2002 VU_{106}	—	November 12, 2002	Socorro	LINEAR	·	5.1 km	MPC · JPL
170067	2002 VU_{108}	—	November 12, 2002	Socorro	LINEAR	EOS	3.4 km	MPC · JPL
170068	2002 VE_{110}	—	November 12, 2002	Palomar	NEAT	·	3.5 km	MPC · JPL
170069	2002 VR_{110}	—	November 12, 2002	Palomar	NEAT	EOS	3.2 km	MPC · JPL
170070	2002 VD_{121}	—	November 12, 2002	Palomar	NEAT	·	3.2 km	MPC · JPL
170071	2002 VT_{127}	—	November 12, 2002	Anderson Mesa	LONEOS	·	3.5 km	MPC · JPL
170072	2002 VG_{128}	—	November 14, 2002	Emerald Lane	L. Ball	EOS	3.3 km	MPC · JPL
170073 Ivanlinscott	2002 VU_{129}	Ivanlinscott	November 9, 2002	Kitt Peak	M. W. Buie	·	3.6 km	MPC · JPL
170074	2002 VC_{132}	—	November 5, 2002	Nyukasa	National Aerospace Laboratory of Japan	·	2.2 km	MPC · JPL
170075	2002 VT_{140}	—	November 12, 2002	Palomar	NEAT	·	5.6 km	MPC · JPL
170076	2002 WK_{2}	—	November 23, 2002	Palomar	NEAT	·	2.7 km	MPC · JPL
170077	2002 WM_{3}	—	November 24, 2002	Palomar	NEAT	·	3.7 km	MPC · JPL
170078	2002 WE_{4}	—	November 24, 2002	Palomar	NEAT	·	3.2 km	MPC · JPL
170079	2002 WB_{7}	—	November 24, 2002	Palomar	NEAT	·	3.2 km	MPC · JPL
170080	2002 WQ_{8}	—	November 24, 2002	Palomar	NEAT	EOS	4.1 km	MPC · JPL
170081	2002 WL_{9}	—	November 24, 2002	Palomar	NEAT	·	3.8 km	MPC · JPL
170082	2002 WK_{12}	—	November 27, 2002	Anderson Mesa	LONEOS	slow	4.9 km	MPC · JPL
170083	2002 WF_{16}	—	November 28, 2002	Haleakala	NEAT	·	3.9 km	MPC · JPL
170084	2002 WZ_{16}	—	November 28, 2002	Haleakala	NEAT	·	4.2 km	MPC · JPL
170085	2002 XU_{1}	—	December 1, 2002	Socorro	LINEAR	EMA	6.0 km	MPC · JPL
170086	2002 XR_{14}	—	December 5, 2002	Socorro	LINEAR	APO +1km · PHA	840 m	MPC · JPL
170087	2002 XD_{15}	—	December 2, 2002	Socorro	LINEAR	·	3.9 km	MPC · JPL
170088	2002 XV_{17}	—	December 5, 2002	Socorro	LINEAR	·	2.5 km	MPC · JPL
170089	2002 XR_{35}	—	December 7, 2002	Desert Eagle	W. K. Y. Yeung	·	3.6 km	MPC · JPL
170090	2002 XK_{41}	—	December 6, 2002	Socorro	LINEAR	·	2.8 km	MPC · JPL
170091	2002 XK_{45}	—	December 10, 2002	Socorro	LINEAR	KOR	2.4 km	MPC · JPL
170092	2002 XE_{54}	—	December 10, 2002	Palomar	NEAT	·	2.2 km	MPC · JPL
170093	2002 XJ_{56}	—	December 9, 2002	Anderson Mesa	LONEOS	·	5.0 km	MPC · JPL
170094	2002 XQ_{56}	—	December 10, 2002	Socorro	LINEAR	·	3.4 km	MPC · JPL
170095	2002 XH_{57}	—	December 10, 2002	Socorro	LINEAR	·	5.9 km	MPC · JPL
170096	2002 XV_{57}	—	December 11, 2002	Socorro	LINEAR	·	5.5 km	MPC · JPL
170097	2002 XV_{59}	—	December 10, 2002	Socorro	LINEAR	EOS	3.8 km	MPC · JPL
170098	2002 XH_{62}	—	December 11, 2002	Socorro	LINEAR	·	3.8 km	MPC · JPL
170099	2002 XV_{62}	—	December 11, 2002	Socorro	LINEAR	EOS	3.5 km	MPC · JPL
170100	2002 XP_{67}	—	December 10, 2002	Socorro	LINEAR	EOS	3.7 km	MPC · JPL

== 170101–170200 ==
back to top

Designation			Discovery			Properties		Ref
Permanent	Provisional	Named after	Date	Site	Discoverer(s)	Category	Diam.	Ref
170101	2002 XM_{70}	—	December 10, 2002	Socorro	LINEAR	·	4.9 km	MPC · JPL
170102	2002 XM_{74}	—	December 11, 2002	Socorro	LINEAR	EOS	3.5 km	MPC · JPL
170103	2002 XT_{74}	—	December 11, 2002	Socorro	LINEAR	·	8.0 km	MPC · JPL
170104	2002 XR_{75}	—	December 11, 2002	Socorro	LINEAR	·	6.5 km	MPC · JPL
170105	2002 XA_{85}	—	December 11, 2002	Socorro	LINEAR	·	5.0 km	MPC · JPL
170106	2002 XW_{87}	—	December 12, 2002	Palomar	NEAT	EOS	4.7 km	MPC · JPL
170107	2002 XJ_{88}	—	December 12, 2002	Palomar	NEAT	·	5.6 km	MPC · JPL
170108	2002 XW_{89}	—	December 14, 2002	Socorro	LINEAR	·	5.0 km	MPC · JPL
170109	2002 XX_{92}	—	December 5, 2002	Socorro	LINEAR	·	5.3 km	MPC · JPL
170110	2002 XH_{95}	—	December 5, 2002	Socorro	LINEAR	·	3.1 km	MPC · JPL
170111	2002 XH_{101}	—	December 5, 2002	Socorro	LINEAR	·	5.0 km	MPC · JPL
170112	2002 XK_{102}	—	December 5, 2002	Socorro	LINEAR	·	4.0 km	MPC · JPL
170113	2002 XV_{103}	—	December 5, 2002	Socorro	LINEAR	EOS	3.3 km	MPC · JPL
170114	2002 XN_{104}	—	December 5, 2002	Socorro	LINEAR	·	3.9 km	MPC · JPL
170115	2002 XV_{105}	—	December 5, 2002	Socorro	LINEAR	EOS	6.2 km	MPC · JPL
170116	2002 XA_{110}	—	December 6, 2002	Socorro	LINEAR	EOS	2.9 km	MPC · JPL
170117	2002 YD_{13}	—	December 31, 2002	Socorro	LINEAR	EOS	4.6 km	MPC · JPL
170118	2002 YW_{15}	—	December 31, 2002	Socorro	LINEAR	H	800 m	MPC · JPL
170119	2002 YY_{16}	—	December 31, 2002	Socorro	LINEAR	·	4.8 km	MPC · JPL
170120	2002 YR_{18}	—	December 31, 2002	Socorro	LINEAR	·	4.4 km	MPC · JPL
170121	2002 YE_{23}	—	December 31, 2002	Socorro	LINEAR	·	4.5 km	MPC · JPL
170122	2002 YU_{26}	—	December 31, 2002	Socorro	LINEAR	·	4.8 km	MPC · JPL
170123	2002 YV_{32}	—	December 27, 2002	Palomar	NEAT	·	5.0 km	MPC · JPL
170124	2003 AE_{4}	—	January 3, 2003	Socorro	LINEAR	H	920 m	MPC · JPL
170125	2003 AL_{4}	—	January 4, 2003	Socorro	LINEAR	·	6.0 km	MPC · JPL
170126	2003 AT_{9}	—	January 4, 2003	Socorro	LINEAR	·	3.2 km	MPC · JPL
170127	2003 AZ_{12}	—	January 1, 2003	Socorro	LINEAR	EUP	8.2 km	MPC · JPL
170128	2003 AN_{17}	—	January 3, 2003	Socorro	LINEAR	·	5.4 km	MPC · JPL
170129	2003 AF_{19}	—	January 4, 2003	Socorro	LINEAR	·	3.7 km	MPC · JPL
170130	2003 AH_{19}	—	January 5, 2003	Socorro	LINEAR	·	4.6 km	MPC · JPL
170131	2003 AC_{26}	—	January 4, 2003	Socorro	LINEAR	·	6.5 km	MPC · JPL
170132	2003 AK_{27}	—	January 4, 2003	Socorro	LINEAR	·	7.1 km	MPC · JPL
170133	2003 AB_{36}	—	January 7, 2003	Socorro	LINEAR	EOS	3.3 km	MPC · JPL
170134	2003 AZ_{42}	—	January 5, 2003	Socorro	LINEAR	·	6.2 km	MPC · JPL
170135	2003 AH_{56}	—	January 5, 2003	Socorro	LINEAR	·	3.9 km	MPC · JPL
170136	2003 AV_{62}	—	January 8, 2003	Socorro	LINEAR	THM	3.6 km	MPC · JPL
170137	2003 AP_{65}	—	January 7, 2003	Socorro	LINEAR	·	5.8 km	MPC · JPL
170138	2003 AC_{67}	—	January 7, 2003	Socorro	LINEAR	·	4.8 km	MPC · JPL
170139	2003 AM_{70}	—	January 10, 2003	Socorro	LINEAR	EUP	6.6 km	MPC · JPL
170140	2003 AQ_{71}	—	January 10, 2003	Socorro	LINEAR	H	1.3 km	MPC · JPL
170141	2003 AQ_{76}	—	January 10, 2003	Socorro	LINEAR	·	5.7 km	MPC · JPL
170142	2003 AH_{79}	—	January 11, 2003	Socorro	LINEAR	TIR	4.6 km	MPC · JPL
170143	2003 AD_{81}	—	January 11, 2003	Socorro	LINEAR	·	4.2 km	MPC · JPL
170144	2003 AN_{81}	—	January 10, 2003	Socorro	LINEAR	·	6.1 km	MPC · JPL
170145	2003 BF_{1}	—	January 24, 2003	Palomar	NEAT	·	3.4 km	MPC · JPL
170146	2003 BX_{18}	—	January 26, 2003	Palomar	NEAT	H	1.1 km	MPC · JPL
170147	2003 BA_{29}	—	January 27, 2003	Socorro	LINEAR	·	4.7 km	MPC · JPL
170148	2003 BZ_{48}	—	January 26, 2003	Kitt Peak	Spacewatch	TIR	5.0 km	MPC · JPL
170149	2003 BB_{49}	—	January 26, 2003	Haleakala	NEAT	·	6.0 km	MPC · JPL
170150	2003 BW_{88}	—	January 28, 2003	Socorro	LINEAR	·	4.6 km	MPC · JPL
170151	2003 CE_{1}	—	February 1, 2003	Socorro	LINEAR	H	1.0 km	MPC · JPL
170152	2003 CU_{14}	—	February 3, 2003	Haleakala	NEAT	·	4.9 km	MPC · JPL
170153	2003 CY_{14}	—	February 4, 2003	Anderson Mesa	LONEOS	·	2.9 km	MPC · JPL
170154	2003 DT_{6}	—	February 23, 2003	Campo Imperatore	CINEOS	·	3.2 km	MPC · JPL
170155	2003 DU_{17}	—	February 28, 2003	Socorro	LINEAR	H	920 m	MPC · JPL
170156	2003 EC_{1}	—	March 3, 2003	Haleakala	NEAT	H	1.2 km	MPC · JPL
170157	2003 EV_{7}	—	March 6, 2003	Anderson Mesa	LONEOS	·	3.3 km	MPC · JPL
170158	2003 EJ_{9}	—	March 6, 2003	Socorro	LINEAR	EOS	3.1 km	MPC · JPL
170159	2003 EG_{18}	—	March 6, 2003	Anderson Mesa	LONEOS	THM	5.8 km	MPC · JPL
170160	2003 EM_{40}	—	March 8, 2003	Socorro	LINEAR	H	1.2 km	MPC · JPL
170161	2003 EX_{59}	—	March 14, 2003	Socorro	LINEAR	H	1.2 km	MPC · JPL
170162 Nicolashayek	2003 FJ_{2}	Nicolashayek	March 23, 2003	Vicques	M. Ory	·	4.4 km	MPC · JPL
170163	2003 FE_{31}	—	March 23, 2003	Palomar	NEAT	SYL · CYB	5.9 km	MPC · JPL
170164	2003 FS_{41}	—	March 25, 2003	Haleakala	NEAT	·	5.8 km	MPC · JPL
170165	2003 FN_{44}	—	March 23, 2003	Kitt Peak	Spacewatch	·	1.1 km	MPC · JPL
170166	2003 FC_{55}	—	March 25, 2003	Haleakala	NEAT	·	1.2 km	MPC · JPL
170167	2003 FN_{78}	—	March 27, 2003	Kitt Peak	Spacewatch	·	4.0 km	MPC · JPL
170168	2003 FF_{86}	—	March 28, 2003	Kitt Peak	Spacewatch	HYG	4.4 km	MPC · JPL
170169	2003 FG_{106}	—	March 26, 2003	Palomar	NEAT	EOS ·	6.6 km	MPC · JPL
170170	2003 FY_{130}	—	March 31, 2003	Socorro	LINEAR	·	1.1 km	MPC · JPL
170171	2003 GZ_{16}	—	April 5, 2003	Socorro	LINEAR	·	4.5 km	MPC · JPL
170172	2003 HV_{7}	—	April 24, 2003	Anderson Mesa	LONEOS	·	1.4 km	MPC · JPL
170173	2003 HF_{38}	—	April 29, 2003	Socorro	LINEAR	·	1.4 km	MPC · JPL
170174	2003 KF_{5}	—	May 22, 2003	Kitt Peak	Spacewatch	·	920 m	MPC · JPL
170175	2003 KE_{9}	—	May 26, 2003	Haleakala	NEAT	·	1.2 km	MPC · JPL
170176	2003 MU_{1}	—	June 21, 2003	Anderson Mesa	LONEOS	·	1.3 km	MPC · JPL
170177	2003 MX_{1}	—	June 22, 2003	Anderson Mesa	LONEOS	·	1.5 km	MPC · JPL
170178	2003 MR_{2}	—	June 25, 2003	Haleakala	NEAT	·	1.6 km	MPC · JPL
170179	2003 MR_{3}	—	June 25, 2003	Socorro	LINEAR	·	1.6 km	MPC · JPL
170180	2003 MP_{5}	—	June 26, 2003	Socorro	LINEAR	·	1.8 km	MPC · JPL
170181	2003 MS_{6}	—	June 26, 2003	Socorro	LINEAR	·	1.4 km	MPC · JPL
170182	2003 MR_{8}	—	June 28, 2003	Socorro	LINEAR	V	1.0 km	MPC · JPL
170183	2003 MB_{11}	—	June 26, 2003	Socorro	LINEAR	·	950 m	MPC · JPL
170184	2003 MV_{11}	—	June 27, 2003	Anderson Mesa	LONEOS	ERI	3.0 km	MPC · JPL
170185	2003 NY_{3}	—	July 3, 2003	Kitt Peak	Spacewatch	V	970 m	MPC · JPL
170186	2003 NS_{6}	—	July 6, 2003	Reedy Creek	J. Broughton	·	1.7 km	MPC · JPL
170187	2003 NF_{10}	—	July 3, 2003	Kitt Peak	Spacewatch	·	1.1 km	MPC · JPL
170188	2003 OE_{2}	—	July 22, 2003	Haleakala	NEAT	·	1.1 km	MPC · JPL
170189	2003 OF_{4}	—	July 21, 2003	Campo Imperatore	CINEOS	·	1.8 km	MPC · JPL
170190	2003 OU_{4}	—	July 22, 2003	Haleakala	NEAT	V	1.2 km	MPC · JPL
170191	2003 OY_{4}	—	July 22, 2003	Haleakala	NEAT	NYS	1.9 km	MPC · JPL
170192	2003 OH_{5}	—	July 22, 2003	Haleakala	NEAT	·	1.3 km	MPC · JPL
170193 Joanguillem	2003 OA_{6}	Joanguillem	July 24, 2003	Majorca	OAM	·	1.9 km	MPC · JPL
170194	2003 OL_{7}	—	July 25, 2003	Palomar	NEAT	·	1.9 km	MPC · JPL
170195	2003 OP_{7}	—	July 25, 2003	Palomar	NEAT	·	1.5 km	MPC · JPL
170196	2003 OM_{8}	—	July 26, 2003	Reedy Creek	J. Broughton	·	2.3 km	MPC · JPL
170197	2003 OW_{9}	—	July 25, 2003	Palomar	NEAT	·	1.6 km	MPC · JPL
170198	2003 OD_{10}	—	July 25, 2003	Socorro	LINEAR	·	2.5 km	MPC · JPL
170199	2003 OV_{16}	—	July 26, 2003	Palomar	NEAT	·	1.0 km	MPC · JPL
170200	2003 OP_{19}	—	July 30, 2003	Campo Imperatore	CINEOS	·	1.5 km	MPC · JPL

== 170201–170300 ==
back to top

Designation			Discovery			Properties		Ref
Permanent	Provisional	Named after	Date	Site	Discoverer(s)	Category	Diam.	Ref
170201	2003 OR_{19}	—	July 30, 2003	Campo Imperatore	CINEOS	·	1.7 km	MPC · JPL
170202	2003 OX_{22}	—	July 30, 2003	Socorro	LINEAR	PHO	1.8 km	MPC · JPL
170203	2003 OX_{23}	—	July 24, 2003	Palomar	NEAT	·	1.4 km	MPC · JPL
170204	2003 OR_{26}	—	July 24, 2003	Palomar	NEAT	·	940 m	MPC · JPL
170205	2003 OD_{31}	—	July 30, 2003	Socorro	LINEAR	V	1.2 km	MPC · JPL
170206	2003 PP_{5}	—	August 1, 2003	Socorro	LINEAR	·	1.7 km	MPC · JPL
170207	2003 PV_{5}	—	August 1, 2003	Socorro	LINEAR	ERI	2.1 km	MPC · JPL
170208	2003 PF_{8}	—	August 2, 2003	Haleakala	NEAT	V	840 m	MPC · JPL
170209	2003 PN_{8}	—	August 3, 2003	Črni Vrh	J. Skvarč, H. Mikuž	·	1.8 km	MPC · JPL
170210	2003 PU_{8}	—	August 4, 2003	Socorro	LINEAR	·	1.1 km	MPC · JPL
170211	2003 PW_{8}	—	August 4, 2003	Socorro	LINEAR	·	1.5 km	MPC · JPL
170212	2003 QS	—	August 18, 2003	Campo Imperatore	CINEOS	·	1.6 km	MPC · JPL
170213	2003 QX_{3}	—	August 18, 2003	Haleakala	NEAT	MAS	1.1 km	MPC · JPL
170214	2003 QU_{4}	—	August 20, 2003	Palomar	NEAT	·	3.1 km	MPC · JPL
170215	2003 QV_{5}	—	August 20, 2003	Needville	Needville	·	1.6 km	MPC · JPL
170216	2003 QN_{6}	—	August 19, 2003	Campo Imperatore	CINEOS	·	1.7 km	MPC · JPL
170217	2003 QK_{7}	—	August 21, 2003	Palomar	NEAT	MAS	970 m	MPC · JPL
170218	2003 QT_{7}	—	August 21, 2003	Palomar	NEAT	NYS	1.3 km	MPC · JPL
170219	2003 QG_{8}	—	August 20, 2003	Palomar	NEAT	V	1.2 km	MPC · JPL
170220	2003 QM_{11}	—	August 21, 2003	Haleakala	NEAT	·	3.0 km	MPC · JPL
170221	2003 QC_{13}	—	August 22, 2003	Haleakala	NEAT	NYS	2.4 km	MPC · JPL
170222	2003 QM_{13}	—	August 22, 2003	Palomar	NEAT	PHO	1.6 km	MPC · JPL
170223	2003 QB_{16}	—	August 20, 2003	Palomar	NEAT	·	1.6 km	MPC · JPL
170224	2003 QD_{16}	—	August 20, 2003	Palomar	NEAT	·	1.0 km	MPC · JPL
170225	2003 QY_{16}	—	August 21, 2003	Campo Imperatore	CINEOS	·	1.6 km	MPC · JPL
170226	2003 QF_{18}	—	August 22, 2003	Palomar	NEAT	NYS	1.7 km	MPC · JPL
170227	2003 QL_{18}	—	August 22, 2003	Socorro	LINEAR	MAS	1.2 km	MPC · JPL
170228	2003 QG_{19}	—	August 22, 2003	Palomar	NEAT	NYS	1.7 km	MPC · JPL
170229	2003 QC_{20}	—	August 22, 2003	Palomar	NEAT	V	1.3 km	MPC · JPL
170230	2003 QK_{20}	—	August 22, 2003	Palomar	NEAT	MAS	1.1 km	MPC · JPL
170231	2003 QB_{22}	—	August 20, 2003	Haleakala	NEAT	·	1.1 km	MPC · JPL
170232	2003 QG_{22}	—	August 20, 2003	Palomar	NEAT	V	980 m	MPC · JPL
170233	2003 QP_{22}	—	August 20, 2003	Palomar	NEAT	·	2.3 km	MPC · JPL
170234	2003 QG_{23}	—	August 20, 2003	Palomar	NEAT	V	1.1 km	MPC · JPL
170235	2003 QW_{23}	—	August 21, 2003	Palomar	NEAT	NYS	1.7 km	MPC · JPL
170236	2003 QP_{24}	—	August 21, 2003	Črni Vrh	Skvarč, J.	·	2.0 km	MPC · JPL
170237	2003 QF_{26}	—	August 22, 2003	Haleakala	NEAT	·	2.2 km	MPC · JPL
170238	2003 QS_{27}	—	August 21, 2003	Črni Vrh	Skvarč, J.	NYS	1.7 km	MPC · JPL
170239	2003 QN_{32}	—	August 21, 2003	Palomar	NEAT	MAS	1.1 km	MPC · JPL
170240	2003 QH_{33}	—	August 22, 2003	Socorro	LINEAR	·	1.4 km	MPC · JPL
170241	2003 QM_{34}	—	August 22, 2003	Palomar	NEAT	V	890 m	MPC · JPL
170242	2003 QL_{35}	—	August 22, 2003	Palomar	NEAT	MAS	1.1 km	MPC · JPL
170243	2003 QG_{36}	—	August 22, 2003	Socorro	LINEAR	V	1.1 km	MPC · JPL
170244	2003 QO_{36}	—	August 22, 2003	Palomar	NEAT	MAS	990 m	MPC · JPL
170245	2003 QF_{38}	—	August 22, 2003	Socorro	LINEAR	·	1.8 km	MPC · JPL
170246	2003 QN_{41}	—	August 22, 2003	Socorro	LINEAR	NYS	2.3 km	MPC · JPL
170247	2003 QN_{43}	—	August 22, 2003	Palomar	NEAT	NYS	1.7 km	MPC · JPL
170248	2003 QP_{43}	—	August 22, 2003	Palomar	NEAT	·	1.7 km	MPC · JPL
170249	2003 QH_{45}	—	August 23, 2003	Socorro	LINEAR	·	1.5 km	MPC · JPL
170250	2003 QP_{46}	—	August 23, 2003	Socorro	LINEAR	·	2.2 km	MPC · JPL
170251	2003 QQ_{48}	—	August 21, 2003	Palomar	NEAT	·	1.7 km	MPC · JPL
170252	2003 QS_{50}	—	August 22, 2003	Haleakala	NEAT	MAS	980 m	MPC · JPL
170253	2003 QZ_{50}	—	August 22, 2003	Palomar	NEAT	·	1.4 km	MPC · JPL
170254	2003 QV_{53}	—	August 23, 2003	Socorro	LINEAR	MAS	1.1 km	MPC · JPL
170255	2003 QY_{54}	—	August 23, 2003	Socorro	LINEAR	NYS	1.7 km	MPC · JPL
170256	2003 QZ_{54}	—	August 23, 2003	Socorro	LINEAR	NYS	1.8 km	MPC · JPL
170257	2003 QA_{55}	—	August 23, 2003	Socorro	LINEAR	·	1.8 km	MPC · JPL
170258	2003 QH_{55}	—	August 23, 2003	Socorro	LINEAR	·	1.7 km	MPC · JPL
170259	2003 QJ_{56}	—	August 23, 2003	Socorro	LINEAR	ERI	3.3 km	MPC · JPL
170260	2003 QU_{56}	—	August 23, 2003	Socorro	LINEAR	·	2.1 km	MPC · JPL
170261	2003 QW_{56}	—	August 23, 2003	Socorro	LINEAR	·	1.9 km	MPC · JPL
170262	2003 QX_{57}	—	August 23, 2003	Palomar	NEAT	·	2.5 km	MPC · JPL
170263	2003 QJ_{59}	—	August 23, 2003	Socorro	LINEAR	NYS	2.3 km	MPC · JPL
170264	2003 QW_{65}	—	August 25, 2003	Palomar	NEAT	·	5.5 km	MPC · JPL
170265	2003 QH_{66}	—	August 22, 2003	Socorro	LINEAR	NYS	1.6 km	MPC · JPL
170266	2003 QR_{72}	—	August 23, 2003	Palomar	NEAT	V	1.0 km	MPC · JPL
170267	2003 QM_{73}	—	August 24, 2003	Socorro	LINEAR	·	2.8 km	MPC · JPL
170268	2003 QY_{73}	—	August 24, 2003	Socorro	LINEAR	·	2.0 km	MPC · JPL
170269	2003 QC_{75}	—	August 24, 2003	Socorro	LINEAR	V	1.1 km	MPC · JPL
170270	2003 QG_{77}	—	August 24, 2003	Socorro	LINEAR	·	1.5 km	MPC · JPL
170271	2003 QL_{78}	—	August 24, 2003	Socorro	LINEAR	·	1.9 km	MPC · JPL
170272	2003 QC_{84}	—	August 24, 2003	Cerro Tololo	M. W. Buie	NYS	1.5 km	MPC · JPL
170273	2003 QO_{84}	—	August 24, 2003	Cerro Tololo	M. W. Buie	·	1.5 km	MPC · JPL
170274	2003 QO_{85}	—	August 24, 2003	Socorro	LINEAR	·	1.8 km	MPC · JPL
170275	2003 QD_{89}	—	August 26, 2003	Socorro	LINEAR	MAS	970 m	MPC · JPL
170276	2003 QH_{92}	—	August 30, 2003	Consell	R. Pacheco	·	1.7 km	MPC · JPL
170277	2003 QW_{92}	—	August 27, 2003	Palomar	NEAT	ERI	3.4 km	MPC · JPL
170278	2003 QD_{99}	—	August 30, 2003	Haleakala	NEAT	·	1.8 km	MPC · JPL
170279	2003 QE_{99}	—	August 30, 2003	Haleakala	NEAT	(2076)	1.5 km	MPC · JPL
170280	2003 QY_{104}	—	August 29, 2003	Haleakala	NEAT	PHO	1.9 km	MPC · JPL
170281	2003 QY_{105}	—	August 30, 2003	Kitt Peak	Spacewatch	·	1.7 km	MPC · JPL
170282	2003 QY_{106}	—	August 30, 2003	Kitt Peak	Spacewatch	·	3.6 km	MPC · JPL
170283	2003 QR_{109}	—	August 31, 2003	Haleakala	NEAT	·	1.9 km	MPC · JPL
170284	2003 QC_{114}	—	August 22, 2003	Palomar	NEAT	·	1.4 km	MPC · JPL
170285	2003 QO_{114}	—	August 23, 2003	Socorro	LINEAR	NYS	1.6 km	MPC · JPL
170286	2003 RT_{6}	—	September 3, 2003	Črni Vrh	Skvarč, J.	V	1.1 km	MPC · JPL
170287	2003 RA_{12}	—	September 13, 2003	Anderson Mesa	LONEOS	·	1.5 km	MPC · JPL
170288	2003 RD_{13}	—	September 14, 2003	Haleakala	NEAT	MAS	1.0 km	MPC · JPL
170289	2003 RV_{14}	—	September 14, 2003	Haleakala	NEAT	·	2.3 km	MPC · JPL
170290	2003 RE_{16}	—	September 15, 2003	Palomar	NEAT	MAS	790 m	MPC · JPL
170291	2003 RL_{16}	—	September 14, 2003	Haleakala	NEAT	·	1.8 km	MPC · JPL
170292	2003 RX_{19}	—	September 15, 2003	Anderson Mesa	LONEOS	·	2.1 km	MPC · JPL
170293	2003 RM_{20}	—	September 15, 2003	Anderson Mesa	LONEOS	NYS	1.8 km	MPC · JPL
170294	2003 RQ_{20}	—	September 15, 2003	Anderson Mesa	LONEOS	NYS	2.0 km	MPC · JPL
170295	2003 SW	—	September 16, 2003	Kitt Peak	Spacewatch	NYS	1.4 km	MPC · JPL
170296	2003 SS_{7}	—	September 16, 2003	Palomar	NEAT	·	1.7 km	MPC · JPL
170297	2003 SL_{11}	—	September 16, 2003	Kitt Peak	Spacewatch	·	1.8 km	MPC · JPL
170298	2003 SM_{11}	—	September 16, 2003	Kitt Peak	Spacewatch	NYS	1.8 km	MPC · JPL
170299	2003 SH_{12}	—	September 16, 2003	Palomar	NEAT	·	1.8 km	MPC · JPL
170300	2003 SA_{14}	—	September 17, 2003	Kitt Peak	Spacewatch	MAS	1.1 km	MPC · JPL

== 170301–170400 ==
back to top

Designation			Discovery			Properties		Ref
Permanent	Provisional	Named after	Date	Site	Discoverer(s)	Category	Diam.	Ref
170301	2003 ST_{14}	—	September 17, 2003	Kitt Peak	Spacewatch	NYS	1.3 km	MPC · JPL
170302	2003 SW_{14}	—	September 17, 2003	Kitt Peak	Spacewatch	NYS	1.7 km	MPC · JPL
170303	2003 SU_{17}	—	September 17, 2003	Kitt Peak	Spacewatch	·	1.5 km	MPC · JPL
170304	2003 SQ_{22}	—	September 16, 2003	Kitt Peak	Spacewatch	MIS	3.8 km	MPC · JPL
170305	2003 SP_{26}	—	September 17, 2003	Haleakala	NEAT	·	1.8 km	MPC · JPL
170306 Augustzátka	2003 SZ_{32}	Augustzátka	September 18, 2003	Kleť	KLENOT	V	1.1 km	MPC · JPL
170307	2003 SN_{33}	—	September 16, 2003	Anderson Mesa	LONEOS	NYS	1.4 km	MPC · JPL
170308	2003 SW_{35}	—	September 18, 2003	Socorro	LINEAR	·	2.0 km	MPC · JPL
170309	2003 SS_{36}	—	September 18, 2003	Desert Eagle	W. K. Y. Yeung	V	1.3 km	MPC · JPL
170310	2003 SM_{38}	—	September 16, 2003	Palomar	NEAT	·	4.8 km	MPC · JPL
170311	2003 SJ_{40}	—	September 16, 2003	Palomar	NEAT	·	1.9 km	MPC · JPL
170312	2003 SD_{43}	—	September 16, 2003	Anderson Mesa	LONEOS	·	1.9 km	MPC · JPL
170313	2003 SU_{43}	—	September 16, 2003	Anderson Mesa	LONEOS	·	1.7 km	MPC · JPL
170314	2003 SG_{44}	—	September 16, 2003	Anderson Mesa	LONEOS	·	1.8 km	MPC · JPL
170315	2003 SS_{46}	—	September 16, 2003	Anderson Mesa	LONEOS	·	1.8 km	MPC · JPL
170316	2003 SU_{49}	—	September 18, 2003	Palomar	NEAT	·	1.7 km	MPC · JPL
170317	2003 SW_{53}	—	September 16, 2003	Kitt Peak	Spacewatch	·	1.6 km	MPC · JPL
170318	2003 SY_{53}	—	September 16, 2003	Kitt Peak	Spacewatch	NYS	1.4 km	MPC · JPL
170319	2003 SF_{54}	—	September 16, 2003	Anderson Mesa	LONEOS	V	1.1 km	MPC · JPL
170320	2003 SK_{67}	—	September 19, 2003	Socorro	LINEAR	·	1.5 km	MPC · JPL
170321	2003 ST_{73}	—	September 18, 2003	Kitt Peak	Spacewatch	·	3.0 km	MPC · JPL
170322	2003 SG_{74}	—	September 18, 2003	Kitt Peak	Spacewatch	·	2.1 km	MPC · JPL
170323	2003 SL_{75}	—	September 18, 2003	Kitt Peak	Spacewatch	MAS	1.1 km	MPC · JPL
170324	2003 ST_{75}	—	September 18, 2003	Kitt Peak	Spacewatch	MAS	960 m	MPC · JPL
170325	2003 SA_{78}	—	September 19, 2003	Kitt Peak	Spacewatch	V	960 m	MPC · JPL
170326	2003 SE_{83}	—	September 18, 2003	Kitt Peak	Spacewatch	MAS	820 m	MPC · JPL
170327	2003 SO_{83}	—	September 18, 2003	Kitt Peak	Spacewatch	NYS	1.6 km	MPC · JPL
170328	2003 SO_{87}	—	September 17, 2003	Socorro	LINEAR	·	2.2 km	MPC · JPL
170329	2003 SY_{89}	—	September 18, 2003	Palomar	NEAT	·	2.2 km	MPC · JPL
170330	2003 SA_{95}	—	September 19, 2003	Kitt Peak	Spacewatch	·	1.0 km	MPC · JPL
170331	2003 SV_{101}	—	September 20, 2003	Palomar	NEAT	·	1.3 km	MPC · JPL
170332	2003 SF_{103}	—	September 20, 2003	Socorro	LINEAR	NYS	1.8 km	MPC · JPL
170333	2003 SJ_{106}	—	September 20, 2003	Palomar	NEAT	·	2.3 km	MPC · JPL
170334	2003 ST_{108}	—	September 20, 2003	Palomar	NEAT	·	1.8 km	MPC · JPL
170335	2003 SW_{108}	—	September 20, 2003	Palomar	NEAT	·	2.7 km	MPC · JPL
170336	2003 SF_{116}	—	September 16, 2003	Anderson Mesa	LONEOS	·	1.8 km	MPC · JPL
170337	2003 SQ_{119}	—	September 17, 2003	Kitt Peak	Spacewatch	·	2.4 km	MPC · JPL
170338	2003 SK_{122}	—	September 18, 2003	Campo Imperatore	CINEOS	·	1.7 km	MPC · JPL
170339	2003 SZ_{125}	—	September 19, 2003	Palomar	NEAT	·	1.7 km	MPC · JPL
170340	2003 SA_{126}	—	September 19, 2003	Socorro	LINEAR	·	2.4 km	MPC · JPL
170341	2003 SH_{137}	—	September 20, 2003	Palomar	NEAT	·	2.3 km	MPC · JPL
170342	2003 SM_{155}	—	September 19, 2003	Anderson Mesa	LONEOS	NYS	1.8 km	MPC · JPL
170343	2003 SN_{156}	—	September 19, 2003	Anderson Mesa	LONEOS	·	2.1 km	MPC · JPL
170344	2003 SH_{157}	—	September 19, 2003	Anderson Mesa	LONEOS	NYS	2.0 km	MPC · JPL
170345	2003 SB_{160}	—	September 20, 2003	Socorro	LINEAR	·	2.0 km	MPC · JPL
170346	2003 SJ_{161}	—	September 18, 2003	Socorro	LINEAR	·	1.5 km	MPC · JPL
170347	2003 SR_{166}	—	September 21, 2003	Socorro	LINEAR	NYS	1.7 km	MPC · JPL
170348	2003 ST_{168}	—	September 23, 2003	Haleakala	NEAT	·	2.9 km	MPC · JPL
170349	2003 SW_{171}	—	September 18, 2003	Kitt Peak	Spacewatch	·	1.1 km	MPC · JPL
170350	2003 SH_{174}	—	September 18, 2003	Kitt Peak	Spacewatch	·	1.8 km	MPC · JPL
170351	2003 SG_{176}	—	September 18, 2003	Palomar	NEAT	NYS	1.4 km	MPC · JPL
170352	2003 ST_{176}	—	September 18, 2003	Palomar	NEAT	·	1.8 km	MPC · JPL
170353	2003 SO_{177}	—	September 18, 2003	Palomar	NEAT	·	1.1 km	MPC · JPL
170354	2003 SG_{180}	—	September 19, 2003	Anderson Mesa	LONEOS	AGN	2.2 km	MPC · JPL
170355	2003 SC_{184}	—	September 21, 2003	Kitt Peak	Spacewatch	·	2.0 km	MPC · JPL
170356	2003 SY_{186}	—	September 22, 2003	Anderson Mesa	LONEOS	·	1.8 km	MPC · JPL
170357	2003 SZ_{190}	—	September 18, 2003	Campo Imperatore	CINEOS	·	1.6 km	MPC · JPL
170358	2003 SJ_{191}	—	September 18, 2003	Palomar	NEAT	·	1.3 km	MPC · JPL
170359	2003 SH_{194}	—	September 20, 2003	Kitt Peak	Spacewatch	·	1.2 km	MPC · JPL
170360	2003 SB_{203}	—	September 22, 2003	Anderson Mesa	LONEOS	·	1.9 km	MPC · JPL
170361	2003 SE_{209}	—	September 24, 2003	Palomar	NEAT	·	2.1 km	MPC · JPL
170362	2003 SL_{209}	—	September 24, 2003	Haleakala	NEAT	RAF	1.2 km	MPC · JPL
170363	2003 ST_{210}	—	September 23, 2003	Palomar	NEAT	V	1.1 km	MPC · JPL
170364	2003 SV_{210}	—	September 23, 2003	Palomar	NEAT	V	1.0 km	MPC · JPL
170365	2003 SW_{212}	—	September 25, 2003	Haleakala	NEAT	·	1.8 km	MPC · JPL
170366	2003 SJ_{216}	—	September 26, 2003	Socorro	LINEAR	·	1.7 km	MPC · JPL
170367	2003 SE_{225}	—	September 26, 2003	Socorro	LINEAR	·	1.6 km	MPC · JPL
170368	2003 SJ_{230}	—	September 24, 2003	Palomar	NEAT	V	1.0 km	MPC · JPL
170369	2003 SC_{234}	—	September 25, 2003	Palomar	NEAT	NYS	2.1 km	MPC · JPL
170370	2003 SE_{237}	—	September 26, 2003	Socorro	LINEAR	(5)	1.5 km	MPC · JPL
170371	2003 SP_{238}	—	September 27, 2003	Socorro	LINEAR	·	1.3 km	MPC · JPL
170372	2003 SA_{244}	—	September 28, 2003	Socorro	LINEAR	·	2.2 km	MPC · JPL
170373	2003 SX_{245}	—	September 26, 2003	Socorro	LINEAR	MAS	990 m	MPC · JPL
170374	2003 SV_{251}	—	September 26, 2003	Socorro	LINEAR	·	1.6 km	MPC · JPL
170375	2003 SU_{253}	—	September 27, 2003	Desert Eagle	W. K. Y. Yeung	·	1.8 km	MPC · JPL
170376	2003 ST_{260}	—	September 27, 2003	Kitt Peak	Spacewatch	NYS	1.5 km	MPC · JPL
170377	2003 SC_{271}	—	September 25, 2003	Haleakala	NEAT	·	1.2 km	MPC · JPL
170378	2003 SD_{272}	—	September 27, 2003	Socorro	LINEAR	HNS	1.9 km	MPC · JPL
170379	2003 SN_{272}	—	September 27, 2003	Socorro	LINEAR	·	2.1 km	MPC · JPL
170380	2003 SC_{274}	—	September 28, 2003	Anderson Mesa	LONEOS	·	1.8 km	MPC · JPL
170381	2003 SD_{284}	—	September 20, 2003	Socorro	LINEAR	·	2.5 km	MPC · JPL
170382	2003 SB_{285}	—	September 20, 2003	Socorro	LINEAR	·	1.8 km	MPC · JPL
170383	2003 SP_{288}	—	September 28, 2003	Socorro	LINEAR	NYS	2.0 km	MPC · JPL
170384	2003 SY_{288}	—	September 28, 2003	Desert Eagle	W. K. Y. Yeung	·	2.1 km	MPC · JPL
170385	2003 SN_{289}	—	September 28, 2003	Socorro	LINEAR	·	2.8 km	MPC · JPL
170386	2003 SH_{293}	—	September 27, 2003	Socorro	LINEAR	·	3.0 km	MPC · JPL
170387	2003 SN_{294}	—	September 28, 2003	Socorro	LINEAR	·	1.8 km	MPC · JPL
170388	2003 SK_{295}	—	September 29, 2003	Anderson Mesa	LONEOS	PHO	1 km	MPC · JPL
170389	2003 SD_{298}	—	September 18, 2003	Haleakala	NEAT	·	2.6 km	MPC · JPL
170390	2003 SK_{298}	—	September 18, 2003	Haleakala	NEAT	MAS	1.1 km	MPC · JPL
170391	2003 SU_{304}	—	September 17, 2003	Palomar	NEAT	(1338) (FLO)	1.1 km	MPC · JPL
170392	2003 SZ_{304}	—	September 17, 2003	Palomar	NEAT	HOF	4.6 km	MPC · JPL
170393	2003 SA_{305}	—	September 17, 2003	Palomar	NEAT	·	2.3 km	MPC · JPL
170394	2003 SC_{319}	—	September 20, 2003	Anderson Mesa	LONEOS	·	1.3 km	MPC · JPL
170395 Nicolevogt	2003 SP_{319}	Nicolevogt	September 26, 2003	Apache Point	SDSS	·	1.4 km	MPC · JPL
170396	2003 SW_{320}	—	September 18, 2003	Palomar	NEAT	·	2.0 km	MPC · JPL
170397	2003 TB_{10}	—	October 6, 2003	Socorro	LINEAR	·	3.7 km	MPC · JPL
170398	2003 TA_{14}	—	October 3, 2003	Kitt Peak	Spacewatch	·	1.4 km	MPC · JPL
170399	2003 TL_{14}	—	October 15, 2003	Anderson Mesa	LONEOS	·	2.2 km	MPC · JPL
170400	2003 TS_{16}	—	October 14, 2003	Palomar	NEAT	V	890 m	MPC · JPL

== 170401–170500 ==
back to top

Designation			Discovery			Properties		Ref
Permanent	Provisional	Named after	Date	Site	Discoverer(s)	Category	Diam.	Ref
170401	2003 TX_{17}	—	October 15, 2003	Uccle	T. Pauwels	·	2.0 km	MPC · JPL
170402	2003 TS_{19}	—	October 15, 2003	Palomar	NEAT	·	2.0 km	MPC · JPL
170403	2003 TZ_{49}	—	October 3, 2003	Haleakala	NEAT	PHO	1.8 km	MPC · JPL
170404	2003 UQ_{1}	—	October 16, 2003	Kitt Peak	Spacewatch	·	3.5 km	MPC · JPL
170405	2003 UK_{4}	—	October 16, 2003	Črni Vrh	Mikuž, H.	·	2.9 km	MPC · JPL
170406	2003 UJ_{15}	—	October 16, 2003	Kitt Peak	Spacewatch	EUN	1.1 km	MPC · JPL
170407	2003 UT_{16}	—	October 16, 2003	Palomar	NEAT	·	2.8 km	MPC · JPL
170408	2003 UL_{20}	—	October 16, 2003	Kitt Peak	Spacewatch	·	3.2 km	MPC · JPL
170409	2003 UK_{27}	—	October 23, 2003	Goodricke-Pigott	R. A. Tucker	·	2.1 km	MPC · JPL
170410	2003 UN_{27}	—	October 24, 2003	Goodricke-Pigott	R. A. Tucker	·	3.1 km	MPC · JPL
170411	2003 UT_{27}	—	October 22, 2003	Goodricke-Pigott	R. A. Tucker	V	1.1 km	MPC · JPL
170412	2003 UX_{28}	—	October 22, 2003	Kitt Peak	Spacewatch	MAS	890 m	MPC · JPL
170413	2003 UG_{31}	—	October 16, 2003	Kitt Peak	Spacewatch	PAD	4.5 km	MPC · JPL
170414	2003 UG_{32}	—	October 16, 2003	Kitt Peak	Spacewatch	·	1.8 km	MPC · JPL
170415	2003 UV_{47}	—	October 27, 2003	Socorro	LINEAR	EUN	2.0 km	MPC · JPL
170416	2003 UU_{52}	—	October 18, 2003	Palomar	NEAT	·	2.3 km	MPC · JPL
170417	2003 UF_{54}	—	October 18, 2003	Palomar	NEAT	·	4.4 km	MPC · JPL
170418	2003 UC_{56}	—	October 19, 2003	Goodricke-Pigott	R. A. Tucker	·	3.1 km	MPC · JPL
170419	2003 UN_{65}	—	October 16, 2003	Palomar	NEAT	·	2.2 km	MPC · JPL
170420	2003 UL_{71}	—	October 19, 2003	Kitt Peak	Spacewatch	·	2.4 km	MPC · JPL
170421	2003 UY_{72}	—	October 19, 2003	Kitt Peak	Spacewatch	·	2.0 km	MPC · JPL
170422	2003 UO_{75}	—	October 17, 2003	Anderson Mesa	LONEOS	·	2.2 km	MPC · JPL
170423	2003 UO_{86}	—	October 18, 2003	Palomar	NEAT	EUN	2.0 km	MPC · JPL
170424	2003 UU_{86}	—	October 18, 2003	Palomar	NEAT	JUN	1.2 km	MPC · JPL
170425	2003 US_{90}	—	October 20, 2003	Socorro	LINEAR	·	1.4 km	MPC · JPL
170426	2003 UT_{90}	—	October 20, 2003	Socorro	LINEAR	·	1.2 km	MPC · JPL
170427	2003 UY_{92}	—	October 20, 2003	Palomar	NEAT	·	1.9 km	MPC · JPL
170428	2003 UL_{94}	—	October 18, 2003	Kitt Peak	Spacewatch	·	1.5 km	MPC · JPL
170429	2003 UP_{95}	—	October 18, 2003	Kitt Peak	Spacewatch	NYS	1.6 km	MPC · JPL
170430	2003 UH_{98}	—	October 19, 2003	Anderson Mesa	LONEOS	·	2.1 km	MPC · JPL
170431	2003 UT_{101}	—	October 20, 2003	Socorro	LINEAR	·	2.8 km	MPC · JPL
170432	2003 UL_{112}	—	October 20, 2003	Socorro	LINEAR	·	2.0 km	MPC · JPL
170433	2003 UQ_{112}	—	October 20, 2003	Socorro	LINEAR	·	3.2 km	MPC · JPL
170434	2003 UP_{117}	—	October 28, 2003	Socorro	LINEAR	NYS	1.8 km	MPC · JPL
170435	2003 UR_{118}	—	October 17, 2003	Kitt Peak	Spacewatch	·	1.7 km	MPC · JPL
170436	2003 UV_{122}	—	October 19, 2003	Socorro	LINEAR	·	1.9 km	MPC · JPL
170437	2003 UY_{123}	—	October 20, 2003	Palomar	NEAT	·	2.3 km	MPC · JPL
170438	2003 UF_{132}	—	October 19, 2003	Palomar	NEAT	·	3.9 km	MPC · JPL
170439	2003 UT_{132}	—	October 19, 2003	Palomar	NEAT	(5)	1.8 km	MPC · JPL
170440	2003 UC_{136}	—	October 21, 2003	Palomar	NEAT	·	2.8 km	MPC · JPL
170441	2003 UV_{141}	—	October 18, 2003	Anderson Mesa	LONEOS	·	2.1 km	MPC · JPL
170442	2003 UH_{144}	—	October 18, 2003	Anderson Mesa	LONEOS	·	1.5 km	MPC · JPL
170443	2003 UF_{145}	—	October 18, 2003	Anderson Mesa	LONEOS	·	1.8 km	MPC · JPL
170444	2003 UK_{149}	—	October 20, 2003	Kitt Peak	Spacewatch	EUN	1.8 km	MPC · JPL
170445	2003 UY_{151}	—	October 21, 2003	Socorro	LINEAR	·	1.8 km	MPC · JPL
170446	2003 UQ_{152}	—	October 21, 2003	Palomar	NEAT	KON	2.8 km	MPC · JPL
170447	2003 UR_{152}	—	October 21, 2003	Palomar	NEAT	·	2.8 km	MPC · JPL
170448	2003 UX_{163}	—	October 21, 2003	Socorro	LINEAR	·	2.4 km	MPC · JPL
170449	2003 UT_{165}	—	October 21, 2003	Kitt Peak	Spacewatch	·	1.3 km	MPC · JPL
170450	2003 UK_{170}	—	October 22, 2003	Kitt Peak	Spacewatch	WIT	1.5 km	MPC · JPL
170451	2003 UJ_{172}	—	October 20, 2003	Socorro	LINEAR	·	1.6 km	MPC · JPL
170452	2003 UQ_{173}	—	October 20, 2003	Kitt Peak	Spacewatch	·	1.3 km	MPC · JPL
170453	2003 UH_{180}	—	October 21, 2003	Socorro	LINEAR	·	1.4 km	MPC · JPL
170454	2003 UL_{183}	—	October 21, 2003	Palomar	NEAT	·	3.6 km	MPC · JPL
170455	2003 UD_{184}	—	October 21, 2003	Palomar	NEAT	slow	2.8 km	MPC · JPL
170456	2003 UF_{184}	—	October 21, 2003	Palomar	NEAT	NYS	2.1 km	MPC · JPL
170457	2003 UY_{188}	—	October 22, 2003	Kitt Peak	Spacewatch	·	1.3 km	MPC · JPL
170458	2003 UX_{192}	—	October 20, 2003	Kitt Peak	Spacewatch	V	1.1 km	MPC · JPL
170459	2003 UQ_{196}	—	October 21, 2003	Kitt Peak	Spacewatch	·	1.2 km	MPC · JPL
170460	2003 UG_{206}	—	October 22, 2003	Socorro	LINEAR	·	2.7 km	MPC · JPL
170461	2003 UO_{206}	—	October 22, 2003	Socorro	LINEAR	V	1.4 km	MPC · JPL
170462	2003 US_{206}	—	October 22, 2003	Kitt Peak	Spacewatch	NYS	1.8 km	MPC · JPL
170463	2003 UD_{207}	—	October 22, 2003	Kitt Peak	Spacewatch	·	3.5 km	MPC · JPL
170464	2003 UE_{209}	—	October 23, 2003	Kitt Peak	Spacewatch	·	2.8 km	MPC · JPL
170465	2003 UE_{211}	—	October 23, 2003	Kitt Peak	Spacewatch	KON	3.7 km	MPC · JPL
170466	2003 UL_{212}	—	October 23, 2003	Kitt Peak	Spacewatch	·	2.2 km	MPC · JPL
170467	2003 UE_{220}	—	October 21, 2003	Socorro	LINEAR	EUN	2.3 km	MPC · JPL
170468	2003 UY_{227}	—	October 23, 2003	Kitt Peak	Spacewatch	·	3.0 km	MPC · JPL
170469	2003 UC_{234}	—	October 24, 2003	Socorro	LINEAR	HNS	2.1 km	MPC · JPL
170470	2003 UU_{236}	—	October 23, 2003	Kitt Peak	Spacewatch	·	1.6 km	MPC · JPL
170471	2003 UJ_{237}	—	October 23, 2003	Haleakala	NEAT	·	1.5 km	MPC · JPL
170472	2003 UF_{239}	—	October 24, 2003	Socorro	LINEAR	·	1.7 km	MPC · JPL
170473	2003 UM_{242}	—	October 24, 2003	Socorro	LINEAR	EUN	1.6 km	MPC · JPL
170474	2003 UH_{244}	—	October 24, 2003	Socorro	LINEAR	·	2.5 km	MPC · JPL
170475	2003 UV_{252}	—	October 26, 2003	Kitt Peak	Spacewatch	BAR	2.5 km	MPC · JPL
170476	2003 UZ_{252}	—	October 26, 2003	Kitt Peak	Spacewatch	·	2.3 km	MPC · JPL
170477	2003 UF_{259}	—	October 25, 2003	Socorro	LINEAR	·	2.5 km	MPC · JPL
170478	2003 UZ_{260}	—	October 26, 2003	Kitt Peak	Spacewatch	·	1.8 km	MPC · JPL
170479	2003 UY_{261}	—	October 26, 2003	Socorro	LINEAR	·	3.5 km	MPC · JPL
170480	2003 UC_{266}	—	October 28, 2003	Socorro	LINEAR	ADE	2.8 km	MPC · JPL
170481	2003 UH_{268}	—	October 28, 2003	Socorro	LINEAR	·	2.2 km	MPC · JPL
170482	2003 UC_{269}	—	October 28, 2003	Haleakala	NEAT	·	2.7 km	MPC · JPL
170483	2003 UU_{271}	—	October 28, 2003	Socorro	LINEAR	·	1.9 km	MPC · JPL
170484	2003 UN_{272}	—	October 29, 2003	Socorro	LINEAR	·	2.2 km	MPC · JPL
170485	2003 UC_{277}	—	October 30, 2003	Haleakala	NEAT	ADE	3.0 km	MPC · JPL
170486	2003 UE_{281}	—	October 28, 2003	Socorro	LINEAR	·	2.2 km	MPC · JPL
170487 Mallder	2003 UE_{285}	Mallder	October 22, 2003	Kitt Peak	M. W. Buie	NYS	1.7 km	MPC · JPL
170488	2003 UQ_{287}	—	October 21, 2003	Palomar	NEAT	CLA	2.5 km	MPC · JPL
170489	2003 UG_{298}	—	October 16, 2003	Kitt Peak	Spacewatch	NYS	1.3 km	MPC · JPL
170490	2003 UZ_{300}	—	October 17, 2003	Anderson Mesa	LONEOS	·	2.2 km	MPC · JPL
170491	2003 UJ_{310}	—	October 21, 2003	Kitt Peak	Spacewatch	·	1.9 km	MPC · JPL
170492	2003 UJ_{314}	—	October 18, 2003	Anderson Mesa	LONEOS	·	2.4 km	MPC · JPL
170493	2003 UY_{314}	—	October 21, 2003	Kitt Peak	Spacewatch	·	1.5 km	MPC · JPL
170494	2003 VE_{4}	—	November 14, 2003	Palomar	NEAT	·	2.2 km	MPC · JPL
170495	2003 VQ_{7}	—	November 15, 2003	Palomar	NEAT	(5)	2.0 km	MPC · JPL
170496	2003 VK_{8}	—	November 15, 2003	Palomar	NEAT	·	3.2 km	MPC · JPL
170497	2003 WE_{2}	—	November 16, 2003	Catalina	CSS	·	2.9 km	MPC · JPL
170498	2003 WW_{5}	—	November 18, 2003	Palomar	NEAT	(5)	4.0 km	MPC · JPL
170499	2003 WY_{5}	—	November 18, 2003	Palomar	NEAT	·	3.6 km	MPC · JPL
170500	2003 WJ_{6}	—	November 16, 2003	Kitt Peak	Spacewatch	·	1.8 km	MPC · JPL

== 170501–170600 ==
back to top

Designation			Discovery			Properties		Ref
Permanent	Provisional	Named after	Date	Site	Discoverer(s)	Category	Diam.	Ref
170501	2003 WS_{6}	—	November 18, 2003	Palomar	NEAT	·	2.0 km	MPC · JPL
170502	2003 WM_{7}	—	November 18, 2003	Palomar	NEAT	T_{j} (2.75) · APO +1km	1.2 km	MPC · JPL
170503	2003 WU_{10}	—	November 18, 2003	Kitt Peak	Spacewatch	·	3.6 km	MPC · JPL
170504	2003 WF_{14}	—	November 16, 2003	Kitt Peak	Spacewatch	·	1.7 km	MPC · JPL
170505	2003 WW_{15}	—	November 16, 2003	Kitt Peak	Spacewatch	NYS	2.1 km	MPC · JPL
170506	2003 WC_{16}	—	November 16, 2003	Kitt Peak	Spacewatch	·	1.4 km	MPC · JPL
170507	2003 WO_{21}	—	November 19, 2003	Powell	Powell	·	1.8 km	MPC · JPL
170508	2003 WC_{32}	—	November 18, 2003	Kitt Peak	Spacewatch	·	2.3 km	MPC · JPL
170509	2003 WG_{32}	—	November 18, 2003	Kitt Peak	Spacewatch	MAR	1.8 km	MPC · JPL
170510	2003 WS_{34}	—	November 19, 2003	Kitt Peak	Spacewatch	·	3.9 km	MPC · JPL
170511	2003 WX_{34}	—	November 19, 2003	Kitt Peak	Spacewatch	(5)	1.9 km	MPC · JPL
170512	2003 WH_{54}	—	November 20, 2003	Socorro	LINEAR	·	2.2 km	MPC · JPL
170513	2003 WW_{54}	—	November 20, 2003	Socorro	LINEAR	·	3.6 km	MPC · JPL
170514	2003 WK_{56}	—	November 20, 2003	Socorro	LINEAR	(5)	2.0 km	MPC · JPL
170515	2003 WO_{57}	—	November 18, 2003	Kitt Peak	Spacewatch	·	1.5 km	MPC · JPL
170516	2003 WF_{58}	—	November 18, 2003	Kitt Peak	Spacewatch	·	2.0 km	MPC · JPL
170517	2003 WM_{59}	—	November 18, 2003	Kitt Peak	Spacewatch	·	3.6 km	MPC · JPL
170518	2003 WW_{60}	—	November 19, 2003	Kitt Peak	Spacewatch	·	1.5 km	MPC · JPL
170519	2003 WM_{62}	—	November 19, 2003	Kitt Peak	Spacewatch	·	1.6 km	MPC · JPL
170520	2003 WQ_{73}	—	November 20, 2003	Socorro	LINEAR	·	3.1 km	MPC · JPL
170521	2003 WS_{74}	—	November 20, 2003	Socorro	LINEAR	PHO	1.4 km	MPC · JPL
170522	2003 WX_{74}	—	November 20, 2003	Socorro	LINEAR	EUN	3.7 km	MPC · JPL
170523	2003 WB_{77}	—	November 19, 2003	Palomar	NEAT	·	2.7 km	MPC · JPL
170524	2003 WL_{78}	—	November 20, 2003	Socorro	LINEAR	PAD	4.1 km	MPC · JPL
170525	2003 WQ_{85}	—	November 20, 2003	Socorro	LINEAR	·	2.6 km	MPC · JPL
170526	2003 WB_{89}	—	November 16, 2003	Catalina	CSS	·	2.0 km	MPC · JPL
170527	2003 WD_{89}	—	November 16, 2003	Catalina	CSS	EUN	2.7 km	MPC · JPL
170528	2003 WQ_{90}	—	November 18, 2003	Kitt Peak	Spacewatch	·	2.3 km	MPC · JPL
170529	2003 WF_{94}	—	November 19, 2003	Anderson Mesa	LONEOS	·	2.5 km	MPC · JPL
170530	2003 WR_{95}	—	November 19, 2003	Anderson Mesa	LONEOS	EUN	1.4 km	MPC · JPL
170531	2003 WF_{96}	—	November 19, 2003	Anderson Mesa	LONEOS	·	2.3 km	MPC · JPL
170532	2003 WK_{96}	—	November 19, 2003	Anderson Mesa	LONEOS	·	1.7 km	MPC · JPL
170533	2003 WW_{96}	—	November 19, 2003	Anderson Mesa	LONEOS	·	2.6 km	MPC · JPL
170534	2003 WJ_{101}	—	November 21, 2003	Socorro	LINEAR	·	1.5 km	MPC · JPL
170535	2003 WR_{103}	—	November 21, 2003	Socorro	LINEAR	·	2.2 km	MPC · JPL
170536	2003 WJ_{108}	—	November 20, 2003	Socorro	LINEAR	·	2.7 km	MPC · JPL
170537	2003 WA_{111}	—	November 20, 2003	Socorro	LINEAR	EUN	2.1 km	MPC · JPL
170538	2003 WX_{112}	—	November 20, 2003	Socorro	LINEAR	·	1.6 km	MPC · JPL
170539	2003 WJ_{114}	—	November 20, 2003	Socorro	LINEAR	(5)	2.1 km	MPC · JPL
170540	2003 WL_{114}	—	November 20, 2003	Socorro	LINEAR	·	2.6 km	MPC · JPL
170541	2003 WV_{115}	—	November 20, 2003	Socorro	LINEAR	TEL	2.5 km	MPC · JPL
170542	2003 WZ_{116}	—	November 20, 2003	Socorro	LINEAR	(5)	2.5 km	MPC · JPL
170543	2003 WM_{120}	—	November 20, 2003	Socorro	LINEAR	·	2.3 km	MPC · JPL
170544	2003 WV_{121}	—	November 20, 2003	Socorro	LINEAR	·	2.8 km	MPC · JPL
170545	2003 WR_{122}	—	November 20, 2003	Socorro	LINEAR	·	2.1 km	MPC · JPL
170546	2003 WL_{124}	—	November 20, 2003	Socorro	LINEAR	·	3.5 km	MPC · JPL
170547	2003 WL_{127}	—	November 20, 2003	Socorro	LINEAR	EUN	1.9 km	MPC · JPL
170548	2003 WZ_{127}	—	November 20, 2003	Socorro	LINEAR	·	4.6 km	MPC · JPL
170549	2003 WU_{129}	—	November 21, 2003	Socorro	LINEAR	MAR	2.0 km	MPC · JPL
170550	2003 WJ_{130}	—	November 21, 2003	Socorro	LINEAR	·	2.2 km	MPC · JPL
170551	2003 WW_{132}	—	November 21, 2003	Socorro	LINEAR	·	2.0 km	MPC · JPL
170552	2003 WR_{135}	—	November 21, 2003	Socorro	LINEAR	·	3.2 km	MPC · JPL
170553	2003 WF_{136}	—	November 21, 2003	Socorro	LINEAR	MAR	1.6 km	MPC · JPL
170554	2003 WZ_{136}	—	November 21, 2003	Socorro	LINEAR	·	2.6 km	MPC · JPL
170555	2003 WS_{138}	—	November 21, 2003	Socorro	LINEAR	·	5.0 km	MPC · JPL
170556	2003 WQ_{141}	—	November 21, 2003	Socorro	LINEAR	·	3.7 km	MPC · JPL
170557	2003 WE_{147}	—	November 23, 2003	Socorro	LINEAR	·	1.7 km	MPC · JPL
170558	2003 WY_{147}	—	November 23, 2003	Kitt Peak	Spacewatch	·	2.2 km	MPC · JPL
170559	2003 WJ_{148}	—	November 24, 2003	Anderson Mesa	LONEOS	·	1.9 km	MPC · JPL
170560	2003 WH_{150}	—	November 24, 2003	Anderson Mesa	LONEOS	·	2.4 km	MPC · JPL
170561	2003 WA_{152}	—	November 26, 2003	Kitt Peak	Spacewatch	·	2.3 km	MPC · JPL
170562	2003 WG_{154}	—	November 26, 2003	Kitt Peak	Spacewatch	EUN ·	3.7 km	MPC · JPL
170563	2003 WO_{160}	—	November 30, 2003	Kitt Peak	Spacewatch	MAS	990 m	MPC · JPL
170564	2003 WW_{165}	—	November 30, 2003	Kitt Peak	Spacewatch	NYS	1.9 km	MPC · JPL
170565	2003 WO_{169}	—	November 19, 2003	Socorro	LINEAR	·	3.3 km	MPC · JPL
170566	2003 WG_{171}	—	November 23, 2003	Anderson Mesa	LONEOS	·	2.2 km	MPC · JPL
170567	2003 WM_{174}	—	November 19, 2003	Kitt Peak	Spacewatch	MAS	1.1 km	MPC · JPL
170568	2003 WM_{190}	—	November 26, 2003	Socorro	LINEAR	PHO	1.7 km	MPC · JPL
170569	2003 WQ_{192}	—	November 24, 2003	Anderson Mesa	LONEOS	·	1.9 km	MPC · JPL
170570	2003 XT_{2}	—	December 1, 2003	Socorro	LINEAR	·	1.4 km	MPC · JPL
170571	2003 XB_{4}	—	December 1, 2003	Socorro	LINEAR	MAS	1.4 km	MPC · JPL
170572	2003 XR_{5}	—	December 3, 2003	Anderson Mesa	LONEOS	·	1.5 km	MPC · JPL
170573	2003 XN_{6}	—	December 3, 2003	Socorro	LINEAR	·	2.4 km	MPC · JPL
170574	2003 XA_{7}	—	December 3, 2003	Anderson Mesa	LONEOS	PHO	2.0 km	MPC · JPL
170575	2003 XM_{9}	—	December 4, 2003	Socorro	LINEAR	HNS	2.1 km	MPC · JPL
170576	2003 XE_{10}	—	December 4, 2003	Socorro	LINEAR	·	5.1 km	MPC · JPL
170577	2003 XQ_{11}	—	December 3, 2003	Socorro	LINEAR	·	2.5 km	MPC · JPL
170578	2003 XU_{13}	—	December 14, 2003	Palomar	NEAT	·	1.7 km	MPC · JPL
170579	2003 XC_{15}	—	December 1, 2003	Socorro	LINEAR	·	3.3 km	MPC · JPL
170580	2003 XM_{15}	—	December 15, 2003	Needville	J. Dellinger	·	2.4 km	MPC · JPL
170581	2003 XC_{18}	—	December 14, 2003	Kitt Peak	Spacewatch	V	1.2 km	MPC · JPL
170582	2003 XN_{19}	—	December 13, 2003	Catalina	CSS	PHO	2.0 km	MPC · JPL
170583	2003 XO_{20}	—	December 14, 2003	Palomar	NEAT	·	1.9 km	MPC · JPL
170584	2003 XA_{22}	—	December 14, 2003	Socorro	LINEAR	·	2.6 km	MPC · JPL
170585	2003 XC_{24}	—	December 1, 2003	Kitt Peak	Spacewatch	·	1.7 km	MPC · JPL
170586	2003 XF_{25}	—	December 1, 2003	Socorro	LINEAR	·	3.6 km	MPC · JPL
170587	2003 XZ_{29}	—	December 1, 2003	Kitt Peak	Spacewatch	·	2.4 km	MPC · JPL
170588	2003 XJ_{38}	—	December 4, 2003	Socorro	LINEAR	EUN	2.1 km	MPC · JPL
170589	2003 XL_{40}	—	December 14, 2003	Kitt Peak	Spacewatch	(5)	1.6 km	MPC · JPL
170590	2003 XL_{43}	—	December 1, 2003	Socorro	LINEAR	·	2.0 km	MPC · JPL
170591	2003 YK_{1}	—	December 17, 2003	Socorro	LINEAR	·	2.5 km	MPC · JPL
170592	2003 YB_{3}	—	December 16, 2003	Kitt Peak	Spacewatch	·	3.3 km	MPC · JPL
170593	2003 YK_{14}	—	December 17, 2003	Socorro	LINEAR	·	2.6 km	MPC · JPL
170594	2003 YN_{14}	—	December 17, 2003	Socorro	LINEAR	EUN	2.3 km	MPC · JPL
170595	2003 YT_{14}	—	December 17, 2003	Socorro	LINEAR	·	3.6 km	MPC · JPL
170596	2003 YU_{19}	—	December 17, 2003	Kitt Peak	Spacewatch	·	3.2 km	MPC · JPL
170597	2003 YA_{20}	—	December 17, 2003	Kitt Peak	Spacewatch	HOF	5.8 km	MPC · JPL
170598	2003 YG_{20}	—	December 17, 2003	Kitt Peak	Spacewatch	·	3.2 km	MPC · JPL
170599	2003 YT_{23}	—	December 17, 2003	Anderson Mesa	LONEOS	·	2.2 km	MPC · JPL
170600	2003 YF_{25}	—	December 18, 2003	Socorro	LINEAR	·	1.6 km	MPC · JPL

== 170601–170700 ==
back to top

Designation			Discovery			Properties		Ref
Permanent	Provisional	Named after	Date	Site	Discoverer(s)	Category	Diam.	Ref
170601	2003 YC_{26}	—	December 18, 2003	Socorro	LINEAR	·	2.6 km	MPC · JPL
170602	2003 YN_{26}	—	December 18, 2003	Socorro	LINEAR	·	5.7 km	MPC · JPL
170603	2003 YC_{29}	—	December 17, 2003	Kitt Peak	Spacewatch	·	2.4 km	MPC · JPL
170604	2003 YC_{30}	—	December 18, 2003	Kitt Peak	Spacewatch	·	2.1 km	MPC · JPL
170605	2003 YW_{30}	—	December 18, 2003	Socorro	LINEAR	·	2.9 km	MPC · JPL
170606	2003 YG_{33}	—	December 16, 2003	Kitt Peak	Spacewatch	·	2.4 km	MPC · JPL
170607	2003 YT_{38}	—	December 19, 2003	Socorro	LINEAR	·	1.5 km	MPC · JPL
170608	2003 YR_{39}	—	December 19, 2003	Kitt Peak	Spacewatch	·	1.9 km	MPC · JPL
170609	2003 YV_{41}	—	December 19, 2003	Kitt Peak	Spacewatch	KOR	2.1 km	MPC · JPL
170610	2003 YG_{44}	—	December 19, 2003	Kitt Peak	Spacewatch	AGN	1.9 km	MPC · JPL
170611	2003 YT_{46}	—	December 17, 2003	Kitt Peak	Spacewatch	·	2.0 km	MPC · JPL
170612	2003 YX_{46}	—	December 17, 2003	Kitt Peak	Spacewatch	·	2.6 km	MPC · JPL
170613	2003 YS_{47}	—	December 18, 2003	Socorro	LINEAR	·	3.0 km	MPC · JPL
170614	2003 YU_{47}	—	December 18, 2003	Socorro	LINEAR	·	2.3 km	MPC · JPL
170615	2003 YT_{49}	—	December 18, 2003	Socorro	LINEAR	·	2.5 km	MPC · JPL
170616	2003 YG_{50}	—	December 18, 2003	Socorro	LINEAR	EUN	2.0 km	MPC · JPL
170617	2003 YW_{50}	—	December 18, 2003	Socorro	LINEAR	·	2.5 km	MPC · JPL
170618	2003 YX_{50}	—	December 18, 2003	Socorro	LINEAR	·	3.6 km	MPC · JPL
170619	2003 YC_{51}	—	December 18, 2003	Socorro	LINEAR	AGN	2.1 km	MPC · JPL
170620	2003 YP_{51}	—	December 18, 2003	Socorro	LINEAR	·	2.7 km	MPC · JPL
170621	2003 YX_{51}	—	December 18, 2003	Socorro	LINEAR	·	2.3 km	MPC · JPL
170622	2003 YJ_{55}	—	December 19, 2003	Socorro	LINEAR	ADE	4.0 km	MPC · JPL
170623	2003 YJ_{57}	—	December 19, 2003	Socorro	LINEAR	EUN	2.1 km	MPC · JPL
170624	2003 YK_{58}	—	December 19, 2003	Socorro	LINEAR	·	2.7 km	MPC · JPL
170625	2003 YN_{61}	—	December 19, 2003	Socorro	LINEAR	·	2.0 km	MPC · JPL
170626	2003 YD_{62}	—	December 19, 2003	Socorro	LINEAR	·	2.3 km	MPC · JPL
170627	2003 YV_{62}	—	December 19, 2003	Socorro	LINEAR	·	3.6 km	MPC · JPL
170628	2003 YL_{65}	—	December 19, 2003	Socorro	LINEAR	·	3.5 km	MPC · JPL
170629	2003 YX_{65}	—	December 20, 2003	Socorro	LINEAR	·	2.3 km	MPC · JPL
170630	2003 YQ_{68}	—	December 19, 2003	Socorro	LINEAR	·	2.7 km	MPC · JPL
170631	2003 YX_{69}	—	December 21, 2003	Socorro	LINEAR	·	2.5 km	MPC · JPL
170632	2003 YK_{70}	—	December 21, 2003	Haleakala	NEAT	·	3.0 km	MPC · JPL
170633	2003 YT_{71}	—	December 18, 2003	Socorro	LINEAR	·	4.0 km	MPC · JPL
170634	2003 YE_{72}	—	December 18, 2003	Socorro	LINEAR	WIT	1.6 km	MPC · JPL
170635	2003 YC_{74}	—	December 18, 2003	Socorro	LINEAR	·	2.0 km	MPC · JPL
170636	2003 YV_{75}	—	December 18, 2003	Socorro	LINEAR	·	2.5 km	MPC · JPL
170637	2003 YA_{79}	—	December 18, 2003	Socorro	LINEAR	·	3.6 km	MPC · JPL
170638	2003 YP_{80}	—	December 18, 2003	Socorro	LINEAR	V	1.1 km	MPC · JPL
170639	2003 YQ_{89}	—	December 19, 2003	Kitt Peak	Spacewatch	·	1.8 km	MPC · JPL
170640	2003 YO_{92}	—	December 21, 2003	Socorro	LINEAR	GEF	2.1 km	MPC · JPL
170641	2003 YF_{94}	—	December 21, 2003	Kitt Peak	Spacewatch	·	3.0 km	MPC · JPL
170642	2003 YX_{95}	—	December 19, 2003	Socorro	LINEAR	ADE	4.3 km	MPC · JPL
170643	2003 YN_{98}	—	December 19, 2003	Socorro	LINEAR	·	2.5 km	MPC · JPL
170644 Tepliczky	2003 YW_{107}	Tepliczky	December 25, 2003	Piszkéstető	K. Sárneczky	EOS	2.9 km	MPC · JPL
170645	2003 YU_{108}	—	December 22, 2003	Socorro	LINEAR	·	2.1 km	MPC · JPL
170646	2003 YB_{112}	—	December 23, 2003	Socorro	LINEAR	(5)	1.8 km	MPC · JPL
170647	2003 YA_{113}	—	December 23, 2003	Socorro	LINEAR	·	3.9 km	MPC · JPL
170648	2003 YA_{114}	—	December 24, 2003	Črni Vrh	Skvarč, J.	·	1.4 km	MPC · JPL
170649	2003 YC_{114}	—	December 25, 2003	Kitt Peak	Spacewatch	·	1.4 km	MPC · JPL
170650	2003 YR_{114}	—	December 25, 2003	Haleakala	NEAT	·	3.5 km	MPC · JPL
170651	2003 YT_{114}	—	December 25, 2003	Haleakala	NEAT	·	2.7 km	MPC · JPL
170652	2003 YJ_{116}	—	December 27, 2003	Socorro	LINEAR	·	2.0 km	MPC · JPL
170653	2003 YG_{119}	—	December 27, 2003	Socorro	LINEAR	(5)	1.9 km	MPC · JPL
170654	2003 YT_{128}	—	December 27, 2003	Socorro	LINEAR	·	3.2 km	MPC · JPL
170655	2003 YD_{129}	—	December 27, 2003	Socorro	LINEAR	·	4.0 km	MPC · JPL
170656	2003 YR_{130}	—	December 28, 2003	Socorro	LINEAR	(5)	2.1 km	MPC · JPL
170657	2003 YO_{132}	—	December 28, 2003	Socorro	LINEAR	·	3.0 km	MPC · JPL
170658	2003 YJ_{134}	—	December 28, 2003	Socorro	LINEAR	·	3.3 km	MPC · JPL
170659	2003 YL_{135}	—	December 28, 2003	Socorro	LINEAR	·	2.4 km	MPC · JPL
170660	2003 YS_{137}	—	December 27, 2003	Socorro	LINEAR	GEF	2.1 km	MPC · JPL
170661	2003 YV_{137}	—	December 27, 2003	Socorro	LINEAR	AGN	2.1 km	MPC · JPL
170662	2003 YD_{141}	—	December 28, 2003	Socorro	LINEAR	EUN	2.4 km	MPC · JPL
170663	2003 YF_{145}	—	December 28, 2003	Socorro	LINEAR	·	3.5 km	MPC · JPL
170664	2003 YT_{145}	—	December 28, 2003	Socorro	LINEAR	·	3.8 km	MPC · JPL
170665	2003 YU_{147}	—	December 29, 2003	Socorro	LINEAR	ADE	2.9 km	MPC · JPL
170666	2003 YV_{151}	—	December 29, 2003	Socorro	LINEAR	EUN	2.6 km	MPC · JPL
170667	2003 YR_{152}	—	December 29, 2003	Kitt Peak	Spacewatch	·	4.9 km	MPC · JPL
170668	2003 YU_{155}	—	December 26, 2003	Haleakala	NEAT	·	2.7 km	MPC · JPL
170669	2003 YH_{158}	—	December 17, 2003	Socorro	LINEAR	·	2.9 km	MPC · JPL
170670	2003 YP_{166}	—	December 17, 2003	Kitt Peak	Spacewatch	·	1.8 km	MPC · JPL
170671	2003 YX_{168}	—	December 18, 2003	Socorro	LINEAR	·	3.4 km	MPC · JPL
170672	2003 YT_{170}	—	December 18, 2003	Kitt Peak	Spacewatch	ADE	5.1 km	MPC · JPL
170673	2003 YG_{174}	—	December 19, 2003	Kitt Peak	Spacewatch	·	3.5 km	MPC · JPL
170674	2003 YM_{174}	—	December 19, 2003	Socorro	LINEAR	·	2.9 km	MPC · JPL
170675	2003 YS_{174}	—	December 19, 2003	Socorro	LINEAR	·	2.5 km	MPC · JPL
170676	2003 YE_{180}	—	December 18, 2003	Socorro	LINEAR	·	1.9 km	MPC · JPL
170677	2003 YP_{180}	—	December 28, 2003	Socorro	LINEAR	·	5.1 km	MPC · JPL
170678	2003 YQ_{180}	—	December 28, 2003	Kitt Peak	Spacewatch	·	2.1 km	MPC · JPL
170679	2004 AE_{1}	—	January 7, 2004	Haleakala	NEAT	·	3.2 km	MPC · JPL
170680	2004 AX_{1}	—	January 13, 2004	Palomar	NEAT	·	3.1 km	MPC · JPL
170681	2004 AF_{3}	—	January 13, 2004	Anderson Mesa	LONEOS	·	5.1 km	MPC · JPL
170682	2004 AM_{3}	—	January 13, 2004	Anderson Mesa	LONEOS	DOR	3.4 km	MPC · JPL
170683	2004 AO_{4}	—	January 13, 2004	Anderson Mesa	LONEOS	·	3.0 km	MPC · JPL
170684	2004 AO_{5}	—	January 13, 2004	Anderson Mesa	LONEOS	·	2.2 km	MPC · JPL
170685	2004 AS_{8}	—	January 14, 2004	Palomar	NEAT	·	2.5 km	MPC · JPL
170686	2004 AK_{24}	—	January 15, 2004	Kitt Peak	Spacewatch	·	2.9 km	MPC · JPL
170687	2004 AV_{24}	—	January 15, 2004	Kitt Peak	Spacewatch	AGN	1.7 km	MPC · JPL
170688	2004 BJ_{1}	—	January 16, 2004	Kitt Peak	Spacewatch	·	1.6 km	MPC · JPL
170689	2004 BN_{2}	—	January 16, 2004	Palomar	NEAT	·	2.8 km	MPC · JPL
170690	2004 BX_{3}	—	January 16, 2004	Palomar	NEAT	·	1.9 km	MPC · JPL
170691	2004 BN_{4}	—	January 16, 2004	Palomar	NEAT	·	2.5 km	MPC · JPL
170692	2004 BV_{9}	—	January 16, 2004	Palomar	NEAT	·	5.0 km	MPC · JPL
170693	2004 BR_{10}	—	January 17, 2004	Haleakala	NEAT	·	2.9 km	MPC · JPL
170694	2004 BW_{14}	—	January 16, 2004	Palomar	NEAT	NYS	2.2 km	MPC · JPL
170695	2004 BB_{16}	—	January 18, 2004	Palomar	NEAT	·	2.6 km	MPC · JPL
170696	2004 BY_{18}	—	January 18, 2004	Goodricke-Pigott	R. A. Tucker	·	3.8 km	MPC · JPL
170697	2004 BT_{20}	—	January 16, 2004	Kitt Peak	Spacewatch	·	2.9 km	MPC · JPL
170698	2004 BD_{23}	—	January 17, 2004	Palomar	NEAT	KOR	2.4 km	MPC · JPL
170699	2004 BL_{23}	—	January 18, 2004	Palomar	NEAT	·	2.7 km	MPC · JPL
170700 Marygoldaross	2004 BY_{23}	Marygoldaross	January 19, 2004	Anderson Mesa	LONEOS	NYS	1.7 km	MPC · JPL

== 170701–170800 ==
back to top

Designation			Discovery			Properties		Ref
Permanent	Provisional	Named after	Date	Site	Discoverer(s)	Category	Diam.	Ref
170701	2004 BX_{24}	—	January 19, 2004	Kitt Peak	Spacewatch	KOR	1.9 km	MPC · JPL
170702	2004 BJ_{25}	—	January 19, 2004	Catalina	CSS	·	4.4 km	MPC · JPL
170703	2004 BB_{26}	—	January 18, 2004	Needville	J. Dellinger	·	2.6 km	MPC · JPL
170704	2004 BP_{29}	—	January 18, 2004	Palomar	NEAT	·	2.0 km	MPC · JPL
170705	2004 BC_{30}	—	January 18, 2004	Palomar	NEAT	THM	3.7 km	MPC · JPL
170706	2004 BA_{31}	—	January 18, 2004	Palomar	NEAT	EOS	3.0 km	MPC · JPL
170707	2004 BU_{31}	—	January 19, 2004	Anderson Mesa	LONEOS	AGN	1.8 km	MPC · JPL
170708	2004 BD_{32}	—	January 19, 2004	Kitt Peak	Spacewatch	·	3.6 km	MPC · JPL
170709	2004 BJ_{37}	—	January 19, 2004	Kitt Peak	Spacewatch	·	2.1 km	MPC · JPL
170710	2004 BC_{38}	—	January 19, 2004	Catalina	CSS	·	4.2 km	MPC · JPL
170711	2004 BD_{40}	—	January 21, 2004	Socorro	LINEAR	AGN	2.1 km	MPC · JPL
170712	2004 BV_{42}	—	January 19, 2004	Catalina	CSS	·	6.9 km	MPC · JPL
170713	2004 BK_{43}	—	January 22, 2004	Socorro	LINEAR	·	2.5 km	MPC · JPL
170714	2004 BU_{43}	—	January 22, 2004	Socorro	LINEAR	(1547)	2.9 km	MPC · JPL
170715	2004 BQ_{46}	—	January 21, 2004	Socorro	LINEAR	·	5.4 km	MPC · JPL
170716	2004 BF_{48}	—	January 21, 2004	Socorro	LINEAR	·	4.4 km	MPC · JPL
170717	2004 BH_{48}	—	January 21, 2004	Socorro	LINEAR	·	3.2 km	MPC · JPL
170718	2004 BM_{48}	—	January 21, 2004	Socorro	LINEAR	·	3.1 km	MPC · JPL
170719	2004 BY_{49}	—	January 21, 2004	Socorro	LINEAR	KOR	1.9 km	MPC · JPL
170720	2004 BF_{50}	—	January 21, 2004	Socorro	LINEAR	KOR	1.9 km	MPC · JPL
170721	2004 BS_{50}	—	January 21, 2004	Socorro	LINEAR	·	3.2 km	MPC · JPL
170722	2004 BJ_{55}	—	January 22, 2004	Socorro	LINEAR	HOF	3.5 km	MPC · JPL
170723	2004 BQ_{57}	—	January 23, 2004	Socorro	LINEAR	·	3.4 km	MPC · JPL
170724	2004 BH_{59}	—	January 24, 2004	Socorro	LINEAR	·	2.0 km	MPC · JPL
170725	2004 BB_{72}	—	January 23, 2004	Socorro	LINEAR	·	3.6 km	MPC · JPL
170726	2004 BN_{73}	—	January 24, 2004	Socorro	LINEAR	·	3.1 km	MPC · JPL
170727	2004 BU_{73}	—	January 24, 2004	Socorro	LINEAR	·	5.5 km	MPC · JPL
170728	2004 BG_{74}	—	January 24, 2004	Socorro	LINEAR	·	2.9 km	MPC · JPL
170729	2004 BR_{75}	—	January 23, 2004	Socorro	LINEAR	·	3.1 km	MPC · JPL
170730	2004 BO_{79}	—	January 22, 2004	Palomar	NEAT	EOS	3.4 km	MPC · JPL
170731	2004 BK_{83}	—	January 28, 2004	Socorro	LINEAR	·	4.4 km	MPC · JPL
170732	2004 BC_{90}	—	January 23, 2004	Socorro	LINEAR	·	4.2 km	MPC · JPL
170733	2004 BL_{90}	—	January 24, 2004	Socorro	LINEAR	·	7.2 km	MPC · JPL
170734	2004 BO_{91}	—	January 24, 2004	Socorro	LINEAR	·	3.6 km	MPC · JPL
170735	2004 BO_{92}	—	January 27, 2004	Anderson Mesa	LONEOS	·	3.5 km	MPC · JPL
170736	2004 BV_{92}	—	January 27, 2004	Anderson Mesa	LONEOS	·	2.6 km	MPC · JPL
170737	2004 BC_{95}	—	January 28, 2004	Socorro	LINEAR	·	2.4 km	MPC · JPL
170738	2004 BM_{98}	—	January 27, 2004	Kitt Peak	Spacewatch	·	4.3 km	MPC · JPL
170739	2004 BU_{103}	—	January 23, 2004	Socorro	LINEAR	·	4.1 km	MPC · JPL
170740	2004 BE_{105}	—	January 24, 2004	Socorro	LINEAR	NYS	2.0 km	MPC · JPL
170741	2004 BM_{105}	—	January 24, 2004	Socorro	LINEAR	·	3.5 km	MPC · JPL
170742	2004 BF_{106}	—	January 26, 2004	Anderson Mesa	LONEOS	·	4.0 km	MPC · JPL
170743	2004 BZ_{106}	—	January 27, 2004	Kitt Peak	Spacewatch	HOF	5.0 km	MPC · JPL
170744	2004 BH_{107}	—	January 28, 2004	Catalina	CSS	·	2.2 km	MPC · JPL
170745	2004 BR_{113}	—	January 28, 2004	Catalina	CSS	·	3.0 km	MPC · JPL
170746	2004 BW_{116}	—	January 28, 2004	Catalina	CSS	·	3.4 km	MPC · JPL
170747	2004 BV_{125}	—	January 16, 2004	Kitt Peak	Spacewatch	·	2.1 km	MPC · JPL
170748	2004 BC_{131}	—	January 16, 2004	Kitt Peak	Spacewatch	KOR	2.2 km	MPC · JPL
170749	2004 BT_{139}	—	January 19, 2004	Kitt Peak	Spacewatch	·	3.7 km	MPC · JPL
170750	2004 BR_{147}	—	January 16, 2004	Palomar	NEAT	·	4.9 km	MPC · JPL
170751	2004 BC_{163}	—	January 31, 2004	Kitt Peak	Spacewatch	KOR	2.2 km	MPC · JPL
170752	2004 CX_{1}	—	February 11, 2004	Desert Eagle	W. K. Y. Yeung	NYS	2.6 km	MPC · JPL
170753	2004 CW_{4}	—	February 10, 2004	Palomar	NEAT	AGN	1.9 km	MPC · JPL
170754	2004 CF_{8}	—	February 10, 2004	Palomar	NEAT	·	6.3 km	MPC · JPL
170755	2004 CF_{17}	—	February 11, 2004	Kitt Peak	Spacewatch	·	2.3 km	MPC · JPL
170756	2004 CS_{18}	—	February 10, 2004	Palomar	NEAT	MRX	1.5 km	MPC · JPL
170757	2004 CH_{19}	—	February 11, 2004	Kitt Peak	Spacewatch	KOR	1.7 km	MPC · JPL
170758	2004 CA_{24}	—	February 12, 2004	Palomar	NEAT	BRA	2.3 km	MPC · JPL
170759	2004 CW_{24}	—	February 12, 2004	Palomar	NEAT	EOS	2.9 km	MPC · JPL
170760	2004 CL_{25}	—	February 11, 2004	Kitt Peak	Spacewatch	·	2.5 km	MPC · JPL
170761	2004 CF_{27}	—	February 11, 2004	Palomar	NEAT	EOS	3.6 km	MPC · JPL
170762	2004 CJ_{42}	—	February 10, 2004	Palomar	NEAT	·	1.6 km	MPC · JPL
170763	2004 CB_{43}	—	February 11, 2004	Palomar	NEAT	·	5.7 km	MPC · JPL
170764	2004 CM_{51}	—	February 15, 2004	Socorro	LINEAR	·	3.7 km	MPC · JPL
170765	2004 CN_{57}	—	February 11, 2004	Kitt Peak	Spacewatch	EOS	3.6 km	MPC · JPL
170766	2004 CM_{66}	—	February 15, 2004	Socorro	LINEAR	·	4.1 km	MPC · JPL
170767	2004 CA_{68}	—	February 10, 2004	Palomar	NEAT	HYG	5.4 km	MPC · JPL
170768	2004 CJ_{68}	—	February 11, 2004	Anderson Mesa	LONEOS	·	3.3 km	MPC · JPL
170769	2004 CT_{68}	—	February 11, 2004	Palomar	NEAT	·	1.6 km	MPC · JPL
170770	2004 CV_{73}	—	February 15, 2004	Socorro	LINEAR	·	5.5 km	MPC · JPL
170771	2004 CW_{73}	—	February 15, 2004	Socorro	LINEAR	·	2.9 km	MPC · JPL
170772	2004 CB_{74}	—	February 15, 2004	Palomar	NEAT	LIX	6.7 km	MPC · JPL
170773	2004 CB_{78}	—	February 11, 2004	Anderson Mesa	LONEOS	·	4.9 km	MPC · JPL
170774	2004 CL_{78}	—	February 11, 2004	Palomar	NEAT	·	1.6 km	MPC · JPL
170775	2004 CY_{83}	—	February 12, 2004	Kitt Peak	Spacewatch	·	2.6 km	MPC · JPL
170776	2004 CA_{95}	—	February 12, 2004	Palomar	NEAT	·	3.2 km	MPC · JPL
170777	2004 CB_{96}	—	February 14, 2004	Kitt Peak	Spacewatch	HYG	5.0 km	MPC · JPL
170778	2004 CP_{96}	—	February 10, 2004	Socorro	LINEAR	·	3.1 km	MPC · JPL
170779	2004 CD_{98}	—	February 14, 2004	Socorro	LINEAR	·	3.1 km	MPC · JPL
170780	2004 CU_{101}	—	February 12, 2004	Palomar	NEAT	·	2.8 km	MPC · JPL
170781	2004 CL_{103}	—	February 12, 2004	Palomar	NEAT	·	3.4 km	MPC · JPL
170782	2004 CG_{104}	—	February 13, 2004	Palomar	NEAT	TIR	3.9 km	MPC · JPL
170783	2004 CT_{105}	—	February 14, 2004	Palomar	NEAT	·	3.0 km	MPC · JPL
170784	2004 CK_{106}	—	February 14, 2004	Palomar	NEAT	·	3.2 km	MPC · JPL
170785	2004 CH_{112}	—	February 11, 2004	Kitt Peak	Spacewatch	·	4.6 km	MPC · JPL
170786	2004 CK_{113}	—	February 13, 2004	Anderson Mesa	LONEOS	·	2.7 km	MPC · JPL
170787	2004 CM_{116}	—	February 11, 2004	Kitt Peak	Spacewatch	·	5.1 km	MPC · JPL
170788	2004 CC_{121}	—	February 12, 2004	Kitt Peak	Spacewatch	·	2.9 km	MPC · JPL
170789	2004 DD_{2}	—	February 18, 2004	Goodricke-Pigott	Goodricke-Pigott	·	3.2 km	MPC · JPL
170790	2004 DY_{4}	—	February 16, 2004	Socorro	LINEAR	·	2.8 km	MPC · JPL
170791	2004 DZ_{6}	—	February 16, 2004	Kitt Peak	Spacewatch	·	2.1 km	MPC · JPL
170792	2004 DL_{10}	—	February 18, 2004	Desert Eagle	W. K. Y. Yeung	·	3.2 km	MPC · JPL
170793	2004 DY_{11}	—	February 17, 2004	Socorro	LINEAR	KOR	2.4 km	MPC · JPL
170794	2004 DB_{12}	—	February 17, 2004	Haleakala	NEAT	·	3.7 km	MPC · JPL
170795	2004 DF_{14}	—	February 16, 2004	Catalina	CSS	·	5.1 km	MPC · JPL
170796	2004 DA_{20}	—	February 17, 2004	Catalina	CSS	·	2.9 km	MPC · JPL
170797	2004 DV_{21}	—	February 17, 2004	Catalina	CSS	·	5.5 km	MPC · JPL
170798	2004 DH_{22}	—	February 17, 2004	Catalina	CSS	·	5.0 km	MPC · JPL
170799	2004 DG_{24}	—	February 19, 2004	Socorro	LINEAR	·	4.8 km	MPC · JPL
170800	2004 DB_{28}	—	February 16, 2004	Kitt Peak	Spacewatch	·	4.6 km	MPC · JPL

== 170801–170900 ==
back to top

Designation			Discovery			Properties		Ref
Permanent	Provisional	Named after	Date	Site	Discoverer(s)	Category	Diam.	Ref
170801	2004 DF_{29}	—	February 17, 2004	Kitt Peak	Spacewatch	KOR	2.5 km	MPC · JPL
170802	2004 DP_{29}	—	February 17, 2004	Kitt Peak	Spacewatch	KOR	2.2 km	MPC · JPL
170803	2004 DY_{29}	—	February 17, 2004	Socorro	LINEAR	·	6.5 km	MPC · JPL
170804	2004 DW_{30}	—	February 17, 2004	Socorro	LINEAR	·	3.5 km	MPC · JPL
170805	2004 DW_{35}	—	February 19, 2004	Socorro	LINEAR	EOS	3.0 km	MPC · JPL
170806	2004 DX_{36}	—	February 19, 2004	Socorro	LINEAR	·	5.4 km	MPC · JPL
170807	2004 DP_{37}	—	February 19, 2004	Socorro	LINEAR	·	5.5 km	MPC · JPL
170808	2004 DD_{38}	—	February 19, 2004	Haleakala	NEAT	EOS	3.3 km	MPC · JPL
170809	2004 DB_{49}	—	February 19, 2004	Socorro	LINEAR	·	3.0 km	MPC · JPL
170810	2004 DU_{51}	—	February 23, 2004	Socorro	LINEAR	·	4.9 km	MPC · JPL
170811	2004 DY_{51}	—	February 23, 2004	Socorro	LINEAR	EOS	3.1 km	MPC · JPL
170812	2004 DT_{65}	—	February 23, 2004	Socorro	LINEAR	KOR	2.2 km	MPC · JPL
170813	2004 DW_{71}	—	February 25, 2004	Wise	Polishook, D.	·	6.0 km	MPC · JPL
170814	2004 DO_{75}	—	February 17, 2004	Kitt Peak	Spacewatch	·	2.6 km	MPC · JPL
170815	2004 EE_{2}	—	March 12, 2004	Palomar	NEAT	·	3.9 km	MPC · JPL
170816	2004 EC_{3}	—	March 10, 2004	Palomar	NEAT	·	4.5 km	MPC · JPL
170817	2004 EV_{4}	—	March 11, 2004	Palomar	NEAT	·	3.1 km	MPC · JPL
170818	2004 EL_{5}	—	March 11, 2004	Palomar	NEAT	·	5.6 km	MPC · JPL
170819	2004 EU_{10}	—	March 15, 2004	Catalina	CSS	·	4.5 km	MPC · JPL
170820	2004 ER_{12}	—	March 11, 2004	Palomar	NEAT	THM	3.7 km	MPC · JPL
170821	2004 EA_{13}	—	March 11, 2004	Palomar	NEAT	·	2.2 km	MPC · JPL
170822	2004 EB_{13}	—	March 11, 2004	Palomar	NEAT	·	6.4 km	MPC · JPL
170823	2004 EO_{14}	—	March 11, 2004	Palomar	NEAT	MRX	2.0 km	MPC · JPL
170824	2004 EO_{34}	—	March 12, 2004	Palomar	NEAT	·	2.4 km	MPC · JPL
170825	2004 EE_{37}	—	March 13, 2004	Palomar	NEAT	·	3.6 km	MPC · JPL
170826	2004 EM_{57}	—	March 15, 2004	Catalina	CSS	·	4.2 km	MPC · JPL
170827	2004 EG_{59}	—	March 15, 2004	Kitt Peak	Spacewatch	·	3.0 km	MPC · JPL
170828	2004 EY_{61}	—	March 12, 2004	Palomar	NEAT	·	2.1 km	MPC · JPL
170829	2004 EL_{63}	—	March 13, 2004	Palomar	NEAT	HYG	5.0 km	MPC · JPL
170830	2004 ET_{66}	—	March 14, 2004	Catalina	CSS	·	3.2 km	MPC · JPL
170831	2004 EK_{67}	—	March 15, 2004	Kitt Peak	Spacewatch	·	4.5 km	MPC · JPL
170832	2004 EF_{75}	—	March 14, 2004	Palomar	NEAT	·	4.6 km	MPC · JPL
170833	2004 EP_{84}	—	March 15, 2004	Socorro	LINEAR	·	1.6 km	MPC · JPL
170834	2004 EY_{85}	—	March 15, 2004	Socorro	LINEAR	·	3.2 km	MPC · JPL
170835	2004 EH_{108}	—	March 15, 2004	Kitt Peak	Spacewatch	·	3.4 km	MPC · JPL
170836	2004 FK_{17}	—	March 25, 2004	Socorro	LINEAR	·	7.2 km	MPC · JPL
170837	2004 FO_{20}	—	March 16, 2004	Catalina	CSS	·	3.2 km	MPC · JPL
170838	2004 FO_{24}	—	March 17, 2004	Socorro	LINEAR	·	4.2 km	MPC · JPL
170839	2004 FP_{34}	—	March 16, 2004	Socorro	LINEAR	·	4.8 km	MPC · JPL
170840	2004 FM_{38}	—	March 17, 2004	Socorro	LINEAR	·	3.7 km	MPC · JPL
170841	2004 FQ_{46}	—	March 17, 2004	Socorro	LINEAR	·	3.8 km	MPC · JPL
170842	2004 FC_{49}	—	March 18, 2004	Socorro	LINEAR	·	4.1 km	MPC · JPL
170843	2004 FU_{51}	—	March 19, 2004	Socorro	LINEAR	·	3.1 km	MPC · JPL
170844	2004 FK_{52}	—	March 19, 2004	Socorro	LINEAR	·	4.2 km	MPC · JPL
170845	2004 FK_{65}	—	March 19, 2004	Socorro	LINEAR	·	3.8 km	MPC · JPL
170846	2004 FR_{76}	—	March 18, 2004	Socorro	LINEAR	·	2.5 km	MPC · JPL
170847	2004 FX_{81}	—	March 17, 2004	Socorro	LINEAR	·	4.3 km	MPC · JPL
170848	2004 FR_{82}	—	March 17, 2004	Kitt Peak	Spacewatch	·	6.0 km	MPC · JPL
170849	2004 FA_{92}	—	March 23, 2004	Socorro	LINEAR	·	6.9 km	MPC · JPL
170850	2004 FV_{92}	—	March 18, 2004	Socorro	LINEAR	THM	3.1 km	MPC · JPL
170851	2004 FA_{103}	—	March 23, 2004	Kitt Peak	Spacewatch	·	2.9 km	MPC · JPL
170852	2004 FE_{105}	—	March 24, 2004	Anderson Mesa	LONEOS	·	7.1 km	MPC · JPL
170853	2004 FJ_{109}	—	March 24, 2004	Anderson Mesa	LONEOS	·	5.4 km	MPC · JPL
170854	2004 FX_{115}	—	March 23, 2004	Socorro	LINEAR	·	4.4 km	MPC · JPL
170855	2004 FK_{116}	—	March 23, 2004	Socorro	LINEAR	·	3.1 km	MPC · JPL
170856	2004 FB_{118}	—	March 22, 2004	Socorro	LINEAR	KOR · fast	2.1 km	MPC · JPL
170857	2004 FZ_{120}	—	March 23, 2004	Socorro	LINEAR	·	4.9 km	MPC · JPL
170858	2004 FE_{121}	—	March 23, 2004	Socorro	LINEAR	·	5.4 km	MPC · JPL
170859	2004 FP_{131}	—	March 22, 2004	Anderson Mesa	LONEOS	LIX	7.1 km	MPC · JPL
170860	2004 FG_{140}	—	March 27, 2004	Anderson Mesa	LONEOS	·	3.1 km	MPC · JPL
170861	2004 GU_{1}	—	April 11, 2004	Catalina	CSS	·	4.2 km	MPC · JPL
170862	2004 GZ_{7}	—	April 12, 2004	Anderson Mesa	LONEOS	·	3.5 km	MPC · JPL
170863	2004 GD_{13}	—	April 12, 2004	Palomar	NEAT	·	4.3 km	MPC · JPL
170864	2004 GA_{30}	—	April 12, 2004	Kitt Peak	Spacewatch	HYG	3.9 km	MPC · JPL
170865	2004 GJ_{31}	—	April 15, 2004	Anderson Mesa	LONEOS	·	3.7 km	MPC · JPL
170866	2004 GL_{33}	—	April 12, 2004	Kitt Peak	Spacewatch	·	3.0 km	MPC · JPL
170867	2004 GB_{38}	—	April 14, 2004	Kitt Peak	Spacewatch	THB	4.6 km	MPC · JPL
170868	2004 GF_{41}	—	April 12, 2004	Siding Spring	SSS	·	3.7 km	MPC · JPL
170869	2004 GP_{44}	—	April 12, 2004	Kitt Peak	Spacewatch	·	5.9 km	MPC · JPL
170870	2004 HA_{4}	—	April 17, 2004	Anderson Mesa	LONEOS	·	5.3 km	MPC · JPL
170871	2004 HG_{9}	—	April 17, 2004	Needville	Needville	·	3.4 km	MPC · JPL
170872	2004 HK_{9}	—	April 17, 2004	Socorro	LINEAR	·	3.1 km	MPC · JPL
170873	2004 HP_{28}	—	April 20, 2004	Socorro	LINEAR	·	5.0 km	MPC · JPL
170874	2004 HS_{37}	—	April 21, 2004	Črni Vrh	Skvarč, J.	·	3.8 km	MPC · JPL
170875	2004 HD_{39}	—	April 25, 2004	Reedy Creek	J. Broughton	·	7.5 km	MPC · JPL
170876	2004 HP_{58}	—	April 23, 2004	Kitt Peak	Spacewatch	·	2.5 km	MPC · JPL
170877	2004 JM_{17}	—	May 12, 2004	Siding Spring	SSS	·	4.3 km	MPC · JPL
170878	2004 LN_{3}	—	June 11, 2004	Palomar	NEAT	·	2.9 km	MPC · JPL
170879 Verbeeckje	2004 LV_{5}	Verbeeckje	June 7, 2004	Uccle	P. De Cat	·	3.0 km	MPC · JPL
170880	2004 PH_{85}	—	August 10, 2004	Socorro	LINEAR	·	1.2 km	MPC · JPL
170881	2004 PG_{101}	—	August 11, 2004	Socorro	LINEAR	·	1.4 km	MPC · JPL
170882	2004 PZ_{102}	—	August 12, 2004	Socorro	LINEAR	·	1.3 km	MPC · JPL
170883	2004 QL_{22}	—	August 26, 2004	Socorro	LINEAR	H	1.0 km	MPC · JPL
170884	2004 RP_{66}	—	September 8, 2004	Socorro	LINEAR	·	6.5 km	MPC · JPL
170885	2004 RH_{79}	—	September 8, 2004	Palomar	NEAT	V	1.2 km	MPC · JPL
170886	2004 RS_{248}	—	September 12, 2004	Socorro	LINEAR	H	1.0 km	MPC · JPL
170887	2004 RD_{249}	—	September 12, 2004	Socorro	LINEAR	H	950 m	MPC · JPL
170888	2004 RK_{249}	—	September 12, 2004	Socorro	LINEAR	H	1.0 km	MPC · JPL
170889	2004 RY_{329}	—	September 14, 2004	Palomar	NEAT	H	890 m	MPC · JPL
170890	2004 SA_{46}	—	September 18, 2004	Socorro	LINEAR	·	1.3 km	MPC · JPL
170891	2004 TY_{16}	—	October 10, 2004	Socorro	LINEAR	AMO +1km	1.4 km	MPC · JPL
170892	2004 TS_{52}	—	October 4, 2004	Kitt Peak	Spacewatch	·	1.0 km	MPC · JPL
170893	2004 TC_{54}	—	October 4, 2004	Kitt Peak	Spacewatch	·	1.2 km	MPC · JPL
170894	2004 TH_{298}	—	October 12, 2004	Kitt Peak	Spacewatch	·	2.2 km	MPC · JPL
170895	2004 TL_{343}	—	October 14, 2004	Socorro	LINEAR	·	1.2 km	MPC · JPL
170896	2004 TW_{356}	—	October 14, 2004	Anderson Mesa	LONEOS	H	820 m	MPC · JPL
170897	2004 UX_{7}	—	October 21, 2004	Socorro	LINEAR	·	1.1 km	MPC · JPL
170898	2004 VC_{25}	—	November 4, 2004	Anderson Mesa	LONEOS	·	820 m	MPC · JPL
170899	2004 VR_{48}	—	November 4, 2004	Kitt Peak	Spacewatch	·	1.0 km	MPC · JPL
170900 Jendrassik	2004 VY_{69}	Jendrassik	November 11, 2004	Piszkéstető	K. Sárneczky	·	880 m	MPC · JPL

== 170901–171000 ==
back to top

Designation			Discovery			Properties		Ref
Permanent	Provisional	Named after	Date	Site	Discoverer(s)	Category	Diam.	Ref
170901	2004 VP_{84}	—	November 10, 2004	Kitt Peak	Spacewatch	(883)	1.2 km	MPC · JPL
170902	2004 VL_{112}	—	November 11, 2004	Kitt Peak	Spacewatch	·	1.0 km	MPC · JPL
170903	2004 WS_{2}	—	November 18, 2004	Socorro	LINEAR	APO +1km · PHA	810 m	MPC · JPL
170904	2004 XW_{19}	—	December 8, 2004	Socorro	LINEAR	·	1.0 km	MPC · JPL
170905	2004 XJ_{31}	—	December 9, 2004	Catalina	CSS	·	1.1 km	MPC · JPL
170906 Coluche	2004 XC_{41}	Coluche	December 9, 2004	Nogales	M. Ory	·	1.1 km	MPC · JPL
170907	2004 XK_{48}	—	December 10, 2004	Socorro	LINEAR	·	2.0 km	MPC · JPL
170908	2004 XK_{61}	—	December 13, 2004	Kitt Peak	Spacewatch	·	1.3 km	MPC · JPL
170909 Bobmasterson	2004 XW_{62}	Bobmasterson	December 12, 2004	Jarnac	Glinos, T., D. H. Levy	·	1.2 km	MPC · JPL
170910 Brandonsanderson	2004 XE_{69}	Brandonsanderson	December 9, 2004	Catalina	CSS	·	1.1 km	MPC · JPL
170911	2004 XH_{97}	—	December 11, 2004	Kitt Peak	Spacewatch	·	1.3 km	MPC · JPL
170912	2004 XG_{102}	—	December 11, 2004	Socorro	LINEAR	·	1.3 km	MPC · JPL
170913	2004 XH_{121}	—	December 14, 2004	Socorro	LINEAR	·	1.2 km	MPC · JPL
170914	2004 XN_{122}	—	December 9, 2004	Kitt Peak	Spacewatch	slow	1.3 km	MPC · JPL
170915	2004 XN_{146}	—	December 14, 2004	Socorro	LINEAR	·	1.4 km	MPC · JPL
170916	2004 XA_{147}	—	December 15, 2004	Catalina	CSS	JUN	2.2 km	MPC · JPL
170917	2004 XD_{147}	—	December 11, 2004	Catalina	CSS	·	6.0 km	MPC · JPL
170918	2004 XM_{148}	—	December 13, 2004	Kitt Peak	Spacewatch	·	2.7 km	MPC · JPL
170919	2004 XM_{162}	—	December 15, 2004	Socorro	LINEAR	·	1.2 km	MPC · JPL
170920	2004 XL_{191}	—	December 15, 2004	Kitt Peak	Spacewatch	·	1.3 km	MPC · JPL
170921	2004 YF_{5}	—	December 16, 2004	Kitt Peak	Spacewatch	·	1.9 km	MPC · JPL
170922	2004 YC_{6}	—	December 16, 2004	Kitt Peak	Spacewatch	PHO	1.7 km	MPC · JPL
170923	2004 YA_{12}	—	December 18, 2004	Mount Lemmon	Mount Lemmon Survey	PHO	1.9 km	MPC · JPL
170924	2004 YC_{21}	—	December 18, 2004	Mount Lemmon	Mount Lemmon Survey	·	2.4 km	MPC · JPL
170925	2004 YY_{22}	—	December 18, 2004	Mount Lemmon	Mount Lemmon Survey	·	1.4 km	MPC · JPL
170926	2004 YM_{26}	—	December 19, 2004	Mount Lemmon	Mount Lemmon Survey	MAS	920 m	MPC · JPL
170927 Dgebessire	2005 AS_{3}	Dgebessire	January 5, 2005	Vicques	M. Ory	·	1.8 km	MPC · JPL
170928	2005 AU_{7}	—	January 6, 2005	Catalina	CSS	·	1.1 km	MPC · JPL
170929	2005 AK_{8}	—	January 6, 2005	Catalina	CSS	NYS	2.1 km	MPC · JPL
170930	2005 AJ_{9}	—	January 7, 2005	Catalina	CSS	·	2.5 km	MPC · JPL
170931	2005 AV_{9}	—	January 7, 2005	Catalina	CSS	V	1.0 km	MPC · JPL
170932	2005 AC_{10}	—	January 7, 2005	Socorro	LINEAR	·	880 m	MPC · JPL
170933	2005 AF_{20}	—	January 6, 2005	Socorro	LINEAR	NYS	1.3 km	MPC · JPL
170934	2005 AK_{22}	—	January 7, 2005	Socorro	LINEAR	·	1.2 km	MPC · JPL
170935	2005 AB_{25}	—	January 7, 2005	Catalina	CSS	·	1.4 km	MPC · JPL
170936	2005 AH_{26}	—	January 11, 2005	Socorro	LINEAR	·	2.2 km	MPC · JPL
170937	2005 AD_{29}	—	January 11, 2005	Socorro	LINEAR	·	2.2 km	MPC · JPL
170938	2005 AT_{35}	—	January 13, 2005	Socorro	LINEAR	·	1.3 km	MPC · JPL
170939	2005 AV_{37}	—	January 13, 2005	Kitt Peak	Spacewatch	·	2.2 km	MPC · JPL
170940	2005 AF_{45}	—	January 15, 2005	Kitt Peak	Spacewatch	·	930 m	MPC · JPL
170941	2005 AO_{48}	—	January 13, 2005	Kitt Peak	Spacewatch	·	960 m	MPC · JPL
170942	2005 AN_{51}	—	January 13, 2005	Catalina	CSS	·	1.4 km	MPC · JPL
170943	2005 AJ_{54}	—	January 13, 2005	Kitt Peak	Spacewatch	·	1.6 km	MPC · JPL
170944	2005 AN_{60}	—	January 15, 2005	Socorro	LINEAR	·	2.2 km	MPC · JPL
170945	2005 AG_{68}	—	January 13, 2005	Catalina	CSS	·	1.8 km	MPC · JPL
170946	2005 BP_{2}	—	January 16, 2005	Socorro	LINEAR	·	5.0 km	MPC · JPL
170947	2005 BA_{4}	—	January 16, 2005	Anderson Mesa	LONEOS	·	5.0 km	MPC · JPL
170948	2005 BE_{4}	—	January 16, 2005	Kitt Peak	Spacewatch	·	1.8 km	MPC · JPL
170949	2005 BA_{6}	—	January 16, 2005	Socorro	LINEAR	·	750 m	MPC · JPL
170950	2005 BG_{6}	—	January 16, 2005	Socorro	LINEAR	NYS	1.6 km	MPC · JPL
170951	2005 BG_{11}	—	January 16, 2005	Kitt Peak	Spacewatch	·	2.0 km	MPC · JPL
170952	2005 BT_{13}	—	January 17, 2005	Kitt Peak	Spacewatch	EOS ·	5.4 km	MPC · JPL
170953	2005 BX_{13}	—	January 17, 2005	Kitt Peak	Spacewatch	·	2.2 km	MPC · JPL
170954	2005 BZ_{19}	—	January 16, 2005	Socorro	LINEAR	(194)	2.7 km	MPC · JPL
170955	2005 BJ_{24}	—	January 17, 2005	Catalina	CSS	BAP	1.1 km	MPC · JPL
170956	2005 BN_{24}	—	January 17, 2005	Catalina	CSS	MAS	1.3 km	MPC · JPL
170957	2005 BB_{25}	—	January 17, 2005	Socorro	LINEAR	·	1.8 km	MPC · JPL
170958	2005 BL_{29}	—	January 31, 2005	Palomar	NEAT	·	2.6 km	MPC · JPL
170959	2005 BN_{31}	—	January 16, 2005	Mauna Kea	Veillet, C.	·	1.7 km	MPC · JPL
170960	2005 CN_{1}	—	February 1, 2005	Catalina	CSS	EUN	1.9 km	MPC · JPL
170961	2005 CD_{3}	—	February 1, 2005	Kitt Peak	Spacewatch	NYS	1.8 km	MPC · JPL
170962	2005 CH_{3}	—	February 1, 2005	Kitt Peak	Spacewatch	ERI	3.5 km	MPC · JPL
170963	2005 CE_{4}	—	February 1, 2005	Kitt Peak	Spacewatch	MAS	1.0 km	MPC · JPL
170964	2005 CP_{8}	—	February 1, 2005	Palomar	NEAT	·	780 m	MPC · JPL
170965	2005 CW_{11}	—	February 1, 2005	Catalina	CSS	·	1.9 km	MPC · JPL
170966	2005 CP_{12}	—	February 2, 2005	Kitt Peak	Spacewatch	JUN	1.7 km	MPC · JPL
170967	2005 CT_{15}	—	February 2, 2005	Socorro	LINEAR	·	1.1 km	MPC · JPL
170968	2005 CK_{19}	—	February 2, 2005	Catalina	CSS	·	1.8 km	MPC · JPL
170969	2005 CH_{21}	—	February 2, 2005	Catalina	CSS	NYS	1.9 km	MPC · JPL
170970	2005 CS_{21}	—	February 2, 2005	Catalina	CSS	NYS	1.7 km	MPC · JPL
170971	2005 CX_{21}	—	February 3, 2005	Socorro	LINEAR	NYS	1.5 km	MPC · JPL
170972	2005 CS_{22}	—	February 1, 2005	Catalina	CSS	(2076)	1.2 km	MPC · JPL
170973	2005 CJ_{25}	—	February 4, 2005	Altschwendt	Altschwendt	·	1.1 km	MPC · JPL
170974	2005 CN_{25}	—	February 4, 2005	Gnosca	S. Sposetti	V	990 m	MPC · JPL
170975	2005 CW_{26}	—	February 1, 2005	Kitt Peak	Spacewatch	NYS	2.0 km	MPC · JPL
170976	2005 CP_{32}	—	February 2, 2005	Kitt Peak	Spacewatch	MAS	1.2 km	MPC · JPL
170977	2005 CV_{35}	—	February 3, 2005	Socorro	LINEAR	·	1.1 km	MPC · JPL
170978	2005 CX_{36}	—	February 3, 2005	Socorro	LINEAR	V	1.2 km	MPC · JPL
170979	2005 CS_{48}	—	February 2, 2005	Catalina	CSS	·	1.1 km	MPC · JPL
170980	2005 CB_{49}	—	February 2, 2005	Socorro	LINEAR	·	2.1 km	MPC · JPL
170981	2005 CH_{51}	—	February 2, 2005	Kitt Peak	Spacewatch	NYS	2.0 km	MPC · JPL
170982	2005 CN_{51}	—	February 2, 2005	Kitt Peak	Spacewatch	MAS	970 m	MPC · JPL
170983	2005 CS_{52}	—	February 3, 2005	Socorro	LINEAR	NYS	1.1 km	MPC · JPL
170984	2005 CO_{53}	—	February 3, 2005	Socorro	LINEAR	V	1.5 km	MPC · JPL
170985	2005 CX_{56}	—	February 2, 2005	Socorro	LINEAR	NYS	1.2 km	MPC · JPL
170986	2005 CF_{58}	—	February 2, 2005	Catalina	CSS	V	1.3 km	MPC · JPL
170987	2005 CG_{59}	—	February 2, 2005	Socorro	LINEAR	·	1.5 km	MPC · JPL
170988	2005 CZ_{59}	—	February 3, 2005	Socorro	LINEAR	·	2.1 km	MPC · JPL
170989	2005 CV_{62}	—	February 9, 2005	Kitt Peak	Spacewatch	·	2.0 km	MPC · JPL
170990	2005 CS_{63}	—	February 9, 2005	Anderson Mesa	LONEOS	·	2.2 km	MPC · JPL
170991	2005 CX_{66}	—	February 9, 2005	Socorro	LINEAR	·	2.0 km	MPC · JPL
170992	2005 CO_{68}	—	February 2, 2005	Socorro	LINEAR	·	1.6 km	MPC · JPL
170993	2005 CU_{69}	—	February 9, 2005	Socorro	LINEAR	·	3.0 km	MPC · JPL
170994	2005 CH_{79}	—	February 1, 2005	Palomar	NEAT	·	3.1 km	MPC · JPL
170995 Ritajoewright	2005 EM_{2}	Ritajoewright	March 3, 2005	Jarnac	Glinos, T., D. H. Levy	·	1.7 km	MPC · JPL
170996	2005 EL_{4}	—	March 1, 2005	Goodricke-Pigott	R. A. Tucker	·	4.6 km	MPC · JPL
170997	2005 EF_{7}	—	March 1, 2005	Goodricke-Pigott	R. A. Tucker	NYS	1.6 km	MPC · JPL
170998	2005 ES_{8}	—	March 2, 2005	Kitt Peak	Spacewatch	·	1.2 km	MPC · JPL
170999	2005 EK_{10}	—	March 2, 2005	Kitt Peak	Spacewatch	·	5.0 km	MPC · JPL
171000	2005 EZ_{13}	—	March 3, 2005	Kitt Peak	Spacewatch	NYS	1.5 km	MPC · JPL

back to top

== See also ==
- Meanings of minor-planet names: 170001–171000
