= Meanings of minor-planet names: 170001–171000 =

As minor planet discoveries are confirmed, they are given a permanent number by the IAU's Minor Planet Center (MPC), and the discoverers can then submit names for them, following the IAU's naming conventions. The list below concerns those minor planets in the specified number-range that have received names, and explains the meanings of those names.

Official naming citations of newly named small Solar System bodies are approved and published in a bulletin by IAU's Working Group for Small Bodies Nomenclature (WGSBN). Before May 2021, citations were published in MPC's Minor Planet Circulars for many decades. Recent citations can also be found on the JPL Small-Body Database (SBDB). Until his death in 2016, German astronomer Lutz D. Schmadel compiled these citations into the Dictionary of Minor Planet Names (DMP) and regularly updated the collection.

Based on Paul Herget's The Names of the Minor Planets, Schmadel also researched the unclear origin of numerous asteroids, most of which had been named prior to World War II. This article incorporates text from this source, which is in the public domain: SBDB New namings may only be added to this list below after official publication as the preannouncement of names is condemned. The WGSBN publishes a comprehensive guideline for the naming rules of non-cometary small Solar System bodies.

== 170001–170100 ==
Named minor planet	Provisional	This minor planet was named for...	Ref · Catalog
170006 Stoughton	2002 TV_{309}	Chris Stoughton (born 1959), American astronomer with the Sloan Digital Sky Survey	JPL · 170006
170007 Strateva	2002 TV_{323}	Iskra Strateva (born 1975), Bulgarian-born, former American astronomer with the Sloan Digital Sky Survey	JPL · 170007
170008 Michaelstrauss	2002 TZ_{338}	Michael Strauss (born 1961), American astronomer with the Sloan Digital Sky Survey	JPL · 170008
170009 Subbarao	2002 TY_{340}	Mark Subbarao (born 1968), an American astronomer with the Sloan Digital Sky Survey.	JPL · 170009
170010 Szalay	2002 TJ_{341}	Alex Szalay (born 1949), American astronomer with the Sloan Digital Sky Survey	JPL · 170010
170011 Szkody	2002 TE_{352}	Paula Szkody (born 1948), American astronomer with the Sloan Digital Sky Survey	JPL · 170011
170012 Anithakar	2002 TF_{359}	Ani Thakar (born 1960), American astronomer with the Sloan Digital Sky Survey	JPL · 170012
170022 Douglastucker	2002 UO_{66}	Douglas Tucker (born 1965), American astronomer with the Sloan Digital Sky Survey	JPL · 170022
170023 Vogeley	2002 UR_{68}	Michael S. Vogeley (born 1965), American astronomer with the Sloan Digital Sky Survey	JPL · 170023
170073 Ivanlinscott	2002 VU_{129}	Ivan R. Linscott (born 1942) is an emeritus research scientist for Stanford University, who served as a science team co-investigator and as Principal Investigator of the REX Radio Science Instrument for the New Horizons mission to Pluto.	JPL · 170073

== 170101–170200 ==
back to top

Named minor planet	Provisional	This minor planet was named for...	Ref · Catalog
170162 Nicolashayek	2003 FJ_{2}	Nicolas Hayek (1928–2010), Swiss-Lebanese entrepreneur best known for the Swatch. He has also been a member of the Jura Astronomy Society (French: Société Jurassienne d'Astronomie), owner of the Jura Observatory, where this minor planet was discovered	JPL · 170162
170193 Joanguillem	2003 OA_{6}	Joan Guillem Cap Caldentey (b. 1982), a Mallorcan amateur astronomer.	IAU · 170193

== 170201–170300 ==
back to top

Named minor planet	Provisional	This minor planet was named for...	Ref · Catalog
There are no named minor planets in this number range

== 170301–170400 ==
back to top

Named minor planet	Provisional	This minor planet was named for...	Ref · Catalog
170306 Augustzátka	2003 SZ_{32}	August Zátka (1847–1935), Czech personality of České Budějovice	JPL · 170306
170395 Nicolevogt	2003 SP_{319}	Nicole Vogt (born 1967), American astronomer with the Sloan Digital Sky Survey	JPL · 170395

== 170401–170500 ==
back to top

Named minor planet	Provisional	This minor planet was named for...	Ref · Catalog
170487 Mallder	2003 UE_{285}	Valerie A. Mallder (born 1963) is a systems engineer at the Johns Hopkins University Applied Physics Laboratory, who served as a Deputy Mission Systems Engineer for the New Horizons mission to Pluto.	JPL · 170487

== 170501–170600 ==
back to top

Named minor planet	Provisional	This minor planet was named for...	Ref · Catalog
There are no named minor planets in this number range

== 170601–170700 ==
back to top

Named minor planet	Provisional	This minor planet was named for...	Ref · Catalog
170644 Tepliczky	2003 YW_{107}	István Tepliczky (b. 1961), a Hungarian amateur astronomer.	IAU · 170644
170700 Marygoldaross	2004 BY_{23}	Mary Golda Ross (1908–2008) was a Native American (Cherokee) mathematician and aerospace pioneer with Lockheed, whose projects included the Agena program and interplanetary probes. A passionate educator, Ross advocated for engineering and mathematics opportunities for women and Native Americans.	IAU · 170700

== 170701–170800 ==
back to top

Named minor planet	Provisional	This minor planet was named for...	Ref · Catalog
There are no named minor planets in this number range

== 170801–170900 ==
back to top

Named minor planet	Provisional	This minor planet was named for...	Ref · Catalog
170879 Verbeeckje	2004 LV_{5}	Elena Verbeeck (born 2010) daughter of Francis Verbeeck, friend of Belgian astronomer Peter De Cat who discovered this minor planet	JPL · 170879
170900 Jendrassik	2004 VY_{69}	György Jendrassik (1898–1954), a Hungarian mechanical engineer who designed the world's first turboprop engine	JPL · 170900

== 170901–171000 ==
back to top

Named minor planet	Provisional	This minor planet was named for...	Ref · Catalog
170906 Coluche	2004 XC_{41}	Michel Colucci (1944–1986), better known as "Coluche", French comedian and actor	JPL · 170906
170909 Bobmasterson	2004 XW_{62}	Bob Masterson (born 1951), an accomplished amateur astronomer and astrophotographer.	JPL · 170909
170910 Brandonsanderson	2004 XE_{69}	Brandon Sanderson (born 1975), a renowned American fantasy author.	JPL · 170910
170927 Dgebessire	2005 AS_{3}	Gérad Bessire (born 1953), a biologist and pedagogue from Courroux, Switzerland	JPL · 170927
170995 Ritajoewright	2005 EM_{2}	Rita (born 1953) and Joseph (born 1962) Wright are enthusiastic outreach astronomers in the Kansas City area. Together they have hosted countless evenings under the stars, mostly at the Warkoczewski Public Observatory, and have led the Heart of America star party, one of the largest gatherings in the U.S., for many years.	JPL · 170995

back to top

Preceded by 169,001–170,000	Meanings of minor-planet names List of minor planets: 170,001–171,000	Succeeded by 171,001–172,000
