= Consell Observatory =

Astronomical observatory in Spain

Coordinates: 39°39′13″N 2°49′21″E

Consell Observatory (Spanish: Observatorio Astronómico de Consell and Catalan: Observatori Astronòmic de Consell; observatory code: 176) is an astronomical observatory owned and operated by the Latin American League of Astronomy. It is located at an altitude of 130 metres (430 ft) in Consell on Mallorca island, which is part of Spain.

== Discoveries ==
The discovery of asteroid (157179) 2004 PW_{66} in 2004, is credited to the observatory. Other discoveries made at the observatory include the asteroids (147367) 2003 CA_{20}, (170276) 2003 QH_{92}, and (213831) 2003 QG_{92} which are credited to astronomer Rafael Pacheco and, in one case, to his collaborator Ángel López Jiménez.

== See also ==
- Astronomical Observatory of Mallorca (OAM)
- List of minor planet discoverers § Discovering dedicated institutions
