= Meanings of minor-planet names: 167001–168000 =

As minor planet discoveries are confirmed, they are given a permanent number by the IAU's Minor Planet Center (MPC), and the discoverers can then submit names for them, following the IAU's naming conventions. The list below concerns those minor planets in the specified number-range that have received names, and explains the meanings of those names.

Official naming citations of newly named small Solar System bodies are approved and published in a bulletin by IAU's Working Group for Small Bodies Nomenclature (WGSBN). Before May 2021, citations were published in MPC's Minor Planet Circulars for many decades. Recent citations can also be found on the JPL Small-Body Database (SBDB). Until his death in 2016, German astronomer Lutz D. Schmadel compiled these citations into the Dictionary of Minor Planet Names (DMP) and regularly updated the collection.

Based on Paul Herget's The Names of the Minor Planets, Schmadel also researched the unclear origin of numerous asteroids, most of which had been named prior to World War II. This article incorporates text from this source, which is in the public domain: SBDB New namings may only be added to this list below after official publication as the preannouncement of names is condemned. The WGSBN publishes a comprehensive guideline for the naming rules of non-cometary small Solar System bodies.

== 167001–167100 ==
| Named minor planet | Provisional | This minor planet was named for... | Ref · Catalog |
|---|---|---|---|
| 167010 Terracina | 2003 QZ_{4} | Annalisa Terracina (born 1973) is married to Italian astronomer Ernesto Palomba, who co-discovered this minor planet. | JPL · 167010 |
| 167018 Csontoscsaba | 2003 QS_{29} | Csaba Csontos (born 1940), a Hungarian architect | JPL · 167018 |

== 167101–167200 ==
back to top

| Named minor planet | Provisional | This minor planet was named for... | Ref · Catalog |
|---|---|---|---|
| 167113 Robertwick | 2003 SW_{78} | Bob Wick (born 1935), American sculptor, co-chairman of Wick Communications, member of the Arizona Astronomy Board, and light pollution advocate | JPL · 167113 |

== 167201–167300 ==
back to top

| Named minor planet | Provisional | This minor planet was named for... | Ref · Catalog |
|---|---|---|---|
| 167208 Lelekovice | 2003 UN_{7} | The Czech village of Lelekovice, birthplace of co-discoverer Kamil Hornoch, on the occasion of the 720th anniversary of the founding of the village | JPL · 167208 |

== 167301–167400 ==
back to top

| Named minor planet | Provisional | This minor planet was named for... | Ref · Catalog |
|---|---|---|---|
| 167341 Börzsöny | 2003 VG | Börzsöny, a mountain range in northern Hungary. | JPL · 167341 |

== 167401–167500 ==
back to top

| Named minor planet | Provisional | This minor planet was named for... | Ref · Catalog |
|---|---|---|---|
There are no named minor planets in this number range

== 167501–167600 ==
back to top

| Named minor planet | Provisional | This minor planet was named for... | Ref · Catalog |
|---|---|---|---|
There are no named minor planets in this number range

== 167601–167700 ==
back to top

| Named minor planet | Provisional | This minor planet was named for... | Ref · Catalog |
|---|---|---|---|
There are no named minor planets in this number range

== 167701–167800 ==
back to top

| Named minor planet | Provisional | This minor planet was named for... | Ref · Catalog |
|---|---|---|---|
| 167748 Markkelly | 2004 XB_{42} | Mark Kelly (born 1964), an astronaut who has flown on four NASA shuttle missions | JPL · 167748 |

== 167801–167900 ==
back to top

| Named minor planet | Provisional | This minor planet was named for... | Ref · Catalog |
|---|---|---|---|
| 167852 Maturana | 2005 DM | Angelica Maturana (born 1971), friend of Italian co-discoverer Andrea Boattini | JPL · 167852 |
| 167855 Natalinistéphane | 2005 ET | Stéphane Natalini (b. 1969), a Corsican amateur astronomer. | IAU · 167855 |
| 167875 Kromminga | 2005 EV_{29} | Albion Kromminga (born 1933), an American physics professor at Calvin College | JPL · 167875 |

== 167901–168000 ==
back to top

| Named minor planet | Provisional | This minor planet was named for... | Ref · Catalog |
|---|---|---|---|
| 167960 Rudzikas | 2005 EV_{249} | Zenonas Rokus Rudzikas (born 1940), Lithuanian theoretical physicist, author president of the Lithuanian Academy of Sciences, and director of the Vilnius University Institute of Theoretical Physics and Astronomy | JPL · 167960 |
| 167971 Carlyhowett | 2005 EF_{303} | Carly J. Howett (born 1979) is a research scientist at Southwest Research Institute, who served as an encounter Composition Team co-investigator for the New Horizons Mission to Pluto. | JPL · 167971 |
| 167976 Ormsbymitchel | 2005 GS_{8} | Ormsby M. Mitchel (1809–1862) was an astronomer who founded the Cincinnati Observatory and later became director of the Dudley Observatory. He published the first popular journal of astronomy (The Sidereal Messenger) in the United States and confirmed that the star Antares is a double star. | JPL · 167976 |

back to top

| Preceded by 166,001–167,000 | Meanings of minor-planet names List of minor planets: 167,001–168,000 | Succeeded by 168,001–169,000 |
