= List of minor planets: 167001–168000 =

The following is a partial list of minor planets, running from minor-planet number 167001 through 168000, inclusive. The primary data for this and other partial lists is based on JPL's "Small-Body Orbital Elements" and data available from the Minor Planet Center. Critical list information is also provided by the MPC, unless otherwise specified from Lowell Observatory. A detailed description of the table's columns and additional sources are given on the main page including a complete list of every page in this series, and a statistical break-up on the dynamical classification of minor planets.

Also see the summary list of all named bodies in numerical and alphabetical order, and the corresponding naming citations for the number range of this particular list. New namings may only be added to this list after official publication, as the preannouncement of names is condemned by the Working Group for Small Bodies Nomenclature of the International Astronomical Union.

Near-Earth obj.	MBA (inner)	MBA (outer)	Centaur
Mars-crosser	MBA (middle)	Jupiter trojan	Trans-Neptunian obj.
Unclassified

== 167001–167100 ==
Designation			Discovery			Properties		Ref
Permanent	Provisional	Named after	Date	Site	Discoverer(s)	Category	Diam.	Ref
167001	2003 PO_{6}	—	August 1, 2003	Socorro	LINEAR	V	1.4 km	MPC · JPL
167002	2003 PD_{7}	—	August 1, 2003	Haleakala	NEAT	·	1.6 km	MPC · JPL
167003	2003 PD_{8}	—	August 2, 2003	Haleakala	NEAT	V	1.1 km	MPC · JPL
167004	2003 PV_{8}	—	August 4, 2003	Socorro	LINEAR	·	1.3 km	MPC · JPL
167005	2003 PY_{8}	—	August 4, 2003	Socorro	LINEAR	NYS	1.6 km	MPC · JPL
167006	2003 PY_{11}	—	August 1, 2003	Socorro	LINEAR	·	3.7 km	MPC · JPL
167007	2003 PZ_{11}	—	August 4, 2003	Socorro	LINEAR	·	1.1 km	MPC · JPL
167008	2003 PT_{12}	—	August 1, 2003	Socorro	LINEAR	PHO	1.7 km	MPC · JPL
167009	2003 QV_{3}	—	August 18, 2003	Haleakala	NEAT	MAS	1.0 km	MPC · JPL
167010 Terracina	2003 QZ_{4}	Terracina	August 20, 2003	Campo Imperatore	CINEOS	V	960 m	MPC · JPL
167011	2003 QP_{6}	—	August 20, 2003	Campo Imperatore	CINEOS	·	2.5 km	MPC · JPL
167012	2003 QF_{9}	—	August 20, 2003	Campo Imperatore	CINEOS	·	1.4 km	MPC · JPL
167013	2003 QV_{11}	—	August 21, 2003	Palomar	NEAT	·	2.2 km	MPC · JPL
167014	2003 QC_{21}	—	August 22, 2003	Palomar	NEAT	·	3.3 km	MPC · JPL
167015	2003 QF_{21}	—	August 22, 2003	Palomar	NEAT	·	1.6 km	MPC · JPL
167016	2003 QZ_{22}	—	August 20, 2003	Palomar	NEAT	·	2.0 km	MPC · JPL
167017	2003 QE_{23}	—	August 20, 2003	Palomar	NEAT	·	1.7 km	MPC · JPL
167018 Csontoscsaba	2003 QS_{29}	Csontoscsaba	August 23, 2003	Piszkéstető	K. Sárneczky	MAS	1.1 km	MPC · JPL
167019	2003 QU_{31}	—	August 21, 2003	Palomar	NEAT	·	1.4 km	MPC · JPL
167020	2003 QH_{32}	—	August 21, 2003	Palomar	NEAT	·	1.8 km	MPC · JPL
167021	2003 QL_{32}	—	August 21, 2003	Palomar	NEAT	V	940 m	MPC · JPL
167022	2003 QL_{33}	—	August 22, 2003	Palomar	NEAT	NYS	2.7 km	MPC · JPL
167023	2003 QZ_{34}	—	August 22, 2003	Socorro	LINEAR	·	2.3 km	MPC · JPL
167024	2003 QU_{35}	—	August 22, 2003	Palomar	NEAT	NYS	2.0 km	MPC · JPL
167025	2003 QM_{36}	—	August 22, 2003	Palomar	NEAT	·	1.4 km	MPC · JPL
167026	2003 QA_{38}	—	August 22, 2003	Socorro	LINEAR	NYS	1.7 km	MPC · JPL
167027	2003 QB_{38}	—	August 22, 2003	Socorro	LINEAR	·	1.6 km	MPC · JPL
167028	2003 QM_{38}	—	August 22, 2003	Socorro	LINEAR	·	2.0 km	MPC · JPL
167029	2003 QJ_{39}	—	August 22, 2003	Socorro	LINEAR	·	2.3 km	MPC · JPL
167030	2003 QN_{39}	—	August 22, 2003	Socorro	LINEAR	·	2.3 km	MPC · JPL
167031	2003 QD_{40}	—	August 22, 2003	Socorro	LINEAR	·	1.7 km	MPC · JPL
167032	2003 QM_{41}	—	August 22, 2003	Socorro	LINEAR	PHO	2.8 km	MPC · JPL
167033	2003 QU_{42}	—	August 22, 2003	Palomar	NEAT	·	1.9 km	MPC · JPL
167034	2003 QA_{43}	—	August 22, 2003	Palomar	NEAT	V	990 m	MPC · JPL
167035	2003 QY_{44}	—	August 23, 2003	Socorro	LINEAR	NYS	1.7 km	MPC · JPL
167036	2003 QF_{45}	—	August 23, 2003	Socorro	LINEAR	·	2.1 km	MPC · JPL
167037	2003 QQ_{45}	—	August 23, 2003	Palomar	NEAT	NYS	1.4 km	MPC · JPL
167038	2003 QW_{49}	—	August 22, 2003	Palomar	NEAT	MAS	1.1 km	MPC · JPL
167039	2003 QA_{50}	—	August 22, 2003	Palomar	NEAT	·	2.2 km	MPC · JPL
167040	2003 QQ_{50}	—	August 22, 2003	Haleakala	NEAT	·	1.5 km	MPC · JPL
167041	2003 QB_{51}	—	August 22, 2003	Palomar	NEAT	·	2.3 km	MPC · JPL
167042	2003 QR_{51}	—	August 23, 2003	Palomar	NEAT	MAS	1.3 km	MPC · JPL
167043	2003 QD_{52}	—	August 23, 2003	Palomar	NEAT	PHO	1.7 km	MPC · JPL
167044	2003 QG_{53}	—	August 23, 2003	Socorro	LINEAR	PHO	2.1 km	MPC · JPL
167045	2003 QK_{53}	—	August 23, 2003	Socorro	LINEAR	·	1.9 km	MPC · JPL
167046	2003 QK_{54}	—	August 23, 2003	Socorro	LINEAR	·	2.4 km	MPC · JPL
167047	2003 QA_{56}	—	August 23, 2003	Socorro	LINEAR	NYS	2.1 km	MPC · JPL
167048	2003 QV_{56}	—	August 23, 2003	Socorro	LINEAR	·	2.4 km	MPC · JPL
167049	2003 QG_{57}	—	August 23, 2003	Socorro	LINEAR	ERI	2.9 km	MPC · JPL
167050	2003 QY_{57}	—	August 23, 2003	Socorro	LINEAR	·	2.3 km	MPC · JPL
167051	2003 QC_{63}	—	August 23, 2003	Socorro	LINEAR	·	2.3 km	MPC · JPL
167052	2003 QB_{67}	—	August 23, 2003	Socorro	LINEAR	·	1.6 km	MPC · JPL
167053	2003 QJ_{67}	—	August 23, 2003	Socorro	LINEAR	·	2.1 km	MPC · JPL
167054	2003 QM_{77}	—	August 24, 2003	Socorro	LINEAR	V	1.0 km	MPC · JPL
167055	2003 QF_{80}	—	August 22, 2003	Palomar	NEAT	·	1.8 km	MPC · JPL
167056	2003 QB_{82}	—	August 23, 2003	Palomar	NEAT	·	1.9 km	MPC · JPL
167057	2003 QC_{85}	—	August 24, 2003	Socorro	LINEAR	·	2.1 km	MPC · JPL
167058	2003 QT_{86}	—	August 25, 2003	Socorro	LINEAR	·	1.5 km	MPC · JPL
167059	2003 QN_{87}	—	August 25, 2003	Socorro	LINEAR	NYS	1.8 km	MPC · JPL
167060	2003 QZ_{87}	—	August 25, 2003	Socorro	LINEAR	·	2.2 km	MPC · JPL
167061	2003 QB_{88}	—	August 25, 2003	Socorro	LINEAR	·	1.9 km	MPC · JPL
167062	2003 QC_{88}	—	August 25, 2003	Socorro	LINEAR	·	2.0 km	MPC · JPL
167063	2003 QR_{93}	—	August 28, 2003	Haleakala	NEAT	NYS	1.8 km	MPC · JPL
167064	2003 QN_{94}	—	August 28, 2003	Haleakala	NEAT	·	2.2 km	MPC · JPL
167065	2003 QD_{102}	—	August 31, 2003	Kitt Peak	Spacewatch	·	1.8 km	MPC · JPL
167066	2003 QT_{105}	—	August 30, 2003	Kitt Peak	Spacewatch	·	1.7 km	MPC · JPL
167067	2003 QL_{108}	—	August 31, 2003	Kitt Peak	Spacewatch	·	2.2 km	MPC · JPL
167068	2003 QY_{109}	—	August 28, 2003	Socorro	LINEAR	·	3.4 km	MPC · JPL
167069	2003 RL_{1}	—	September 2, 2003	Haleakala	NEAT	PHO	1.9 km	MPC · JPL
167070	2003 RQ_{2}	—	September 1, 2003	Socorro	LINEAR	·	2.3 km	MPC · JPL
167071	2003 RR_{5}	—	September 3, 2003	Socorro	LINEAR	·	4.2 km	MPC · JPL
167072	2003 RS_{10}	—	September 8, 2003	Haleakala	NEAT	·	3.1 km	MPC · JPL
167073	2003 RG_{14}	—	September 15, 2003	Kleť	M. Tichý	·	2.2 km	MPC · JPL
167074	2003 RN_{14}	—	September 14, 2003	Haleakala	NEAT	V	1.1 km	MPC · JPL
167075	2003 RY_{14}	—	September 14, 2003	Palomar	NEAT	NYS	2.7 km	MPC · JPL
167076	2003 RG_{18}	—	September 15, 2003	Palomar	NEAT	·	1.9 km	MPC · JPL
167077	2003 RZ_{19}	—	September 15, 2003	Anderson Mesa	LONEOS	·	2.1 km	MPC · JPL
167078	2003 RC_{20}	—	September 15, 2003	Anderson Mesa	LONEOS	·	2.6 km	MPC · JPL
167079	2003 RN_{21}	—	September 13, 2003	Haleakala	NEAT	·	2.5 km	MPC · JPL
167080	2003 RX_{21}	—	September 13, 2003	Haleakala	NEAT	·	1.9 km	MPC · JPL
167081	2003 RD_{22}	—	September 14, 2003	Haleakala	NEAT	·	2.3 km	MPC · JPL
167082	2003 RX_{22}	—	September 3, 2003	Socorro	LINEAR	·	3.1 km	MPC · JPL
167083	2003 RR_{25}	—	September 15, 2003	Palomar	NEAT	PHO	1.5 km	MPC · JPL
167084	2003 SF_{6}	—	September 16, 2003	Kitt Peak	Spacewatch	V	1.2 km	MPC · JPL
167085	2003 SC_{8}	—	September 16, 2003	Kitt Peak	Spacewatch	·	2.0 km	MPC · JPL
167086	2003 ST_{13}	—	September 16, 2003	Kitt Peak	Spacewatch	MAS	1.1 km	MPC · JPL
167087	2003 SD_{14}	—	September 17, 2003	Kitt Peak	Spacewatch	NYS	1.7 km	MPC · JPL
167088	2003 SX_{15}	—	September 16, 2003	Kitt Peak	Spacewatch	NYS	1.6 km	MPC · JPL
167089	2003 SA_{16}	—	September 17, 2003	Kitt Peak	Spacewatch	·	1.3 km	MPC · JPL
167090	2003 SK_{22}	—	September 16, 2003	Kitt Peak	Spacewatch	NYS	1.5 km	MPC · JPL
167091	2003 SN_{22}	—	September 16, 2003	Kitt Peak	Spacewatch	HOF	3.9 km	MPC · JPL
167092	2003 ST_{24}	—	September 17, 2003	Haleakala	NEAT	·	2.4 km	MPC · JPL
167093	2003 SS_{29}	—	September 18, 2003	Palomar	NEAT	RAF	2.0 km	MPC · JPL
167094	2003 SQ_{31}	—	September 18, 2003	Kitt Peak	Spacewatch	NYS	1.5 km	MPC · JPL
167095	2003 SH_{32}	—	September 17, 2003	Palomar	NEAT	·	2.2 km	MPC · JPL
167096	2003 SX_{32}	—	September 18, 2003	Socorro	LINEAR	·	1.9 km	MPC · JPL
167097	2003 SL_{33}	—	September 16, 2003	Anderson Mesa	LONEOS	MAS	1.3 km	MPC · JPL
167098	2003 SF_{37}	—	September 16, 2003	Palomar	NEAT	·	2.3 km	MPC · JPL
167099	2003 SP_{40}	—	September 16, 2003	Palomar	NEAT	·	2.2 km	MPC · JPL
167100	2003 ST_{43}	—	September 16, 2003	Anderson Mesa	LONEOS	KON	3.6 km	MPC · JPL

== 167101–167200 ==
back to top

Designation			Discovery			Properties		Ref
Permanent	Provisional	Named after	Date	Site	Discoverer(s)	Category	Diam.	Ref
167101	2003 ST_{46}	—	September 16, 2003	Anderson Mesa	LONEOS	·	1.9 km	MPC · JPL
167102	2003 SB_{47}	—	September 16, 2003	Anderson Mesa	LONEOS	·	1.9 km	MPC · JPL
167103	2003 SL_{50}	—	September 18, 2003	Palomar	NEAT	·	2.4 km	MPC · JPL
167104	2003 SB_{51}	—	September 18, 2003	Palomar	NEAT	·	3.3 km	MPC · JPL
167105	2003 SD_{52}	—	September 18, 2003	Palomar	NEAT	·	2.0 km	MPC · JPL
167106	2003 SS_{60}	—	September 17, 2003	Kitt Peak	Spacewatch	·	2.4 km	MPC · JPL
167107	2003 SK_{61}	—	September 17, 2003	Socorro	LINEAR	NYS	1.8 km	MPC · JPL
167108	2003 SX_{61}	—	September 17, 2003	Socorro	LINEAR	·	2.0 km	MPC · JPL
167109	2003 SK_{74}	—	September 18, 2003	Kitt Peak	Spacewatch	·	2.3 km	MPC · JPL
167110	2003 SG_{76}	—	September 18, 2003	Kitt Peak	Spacewatch	·	1.3 km	MPC · JPL
167111	2003 SU_{77}	—	September 19, 2003	Kitt Peak	Spacewatch	·	1.7 km	MPC · JPL
167112	2003 SH_{78}	—	September 19, 2003	Kitt Peak	Spacewatch	·	1.2 km	MPC · JPL
167113 Robertwick	2003 SW_{78}	Robertwick	September 19, 2003	Junk Bond	D. Healy	·	1.6 km	MPC · JPL
167114	2003 SM_{82}	—	September 18, 2003	Socorro	LINEAR	·	1.3 km	MPC · JPL
167115	2003 SU_{85}	—	September 16, 2003	Kitt Peak	Spacewatch	·	2.6 km	MPC · JPL
167116	2003 SE_{87}	—	September 17, 2003	Socorro	LINEAR	·	2.0 km	MPC · JPL
167117	2003 SF_{90}	—	September 18, 2003	Socorro	LINEAR	NYS	1.5 km	MPC · JPL
167118	2003 SG_{90}	—	September 18, 2003	Socorro	LINEAR	·	1.9 km	MPC · JPL
167119	2003 SW_{90}	—	September 18, 2003	Socorro	LINEAR	MAS	1.3 km	MPC · JPL
167120	2003 SR_{98}	—	September 19, 2003	Haleakala	NEAT	·	2.5 km	MPC · JPL
167121	2003 SZ_{122}	—	September 18, 2003	Socorro	LINEAR	EUN	1.5 km	MPC · JPL
167122	2003 SL_{123}	—	September 18, 2003	Socorro	LINEAR	NYS	2.2 km	MPC · JPL
167123	2003 SU_{124}	—	September 18, 2003	Palomar	NEAT	·	2.0 km	MPC · JPL
167124	2003 SB_{134}	—	September 18, 2003	Socorro	LINEAR	·	1.5 km	MPC · JPL
167125	2003 SZ_{137}	—	September 19, 2003	Palomar	NEAT	·	980 m	MPC · JPL
167126	2003 SS_{141}	—	September 20, 2003	Campo Imperatore	CINEOS	·	3.7 km	MPC · JPL
167127	2003 SX_{143}	—	September 21, 2003	Socorro	LINEAR	(5)	2.0 km	MPC · JPL
167128	2003 SK_{148}	—	September 16, 2003	Socorro	LINEAR	·	4.0 km	MPC · JPL
167129	2003 SO_{155}	—	September 19, 2003	Anderson Mesa	LONEOS	·	1.9 km	MPC · JPL
167130	2003 SL_{156}	—	September 19, 2003	Anderson Mesa	LONEOS	·	1.7 km	MPC · JPL
167131	2003 SR_{159}	—	September 22, 2003	Kitt Peak	Spacewatch	·	2.2 km	MPC · JPL
167132	2003 SX_{162}	—	September 19, 2003	Kitt Peak	Spacewatch	MAS	1.2 km	MPC · JPL
167133	2003 SS_{164}	—	September 20, 2003	Anderson Mesa	LONEOS	·	3.3 km	MPC · JPL
167134	2003 SF_{167}	—	September 22, 2003	Socorro	LINEAR	ADE	4.8 km	MPC · JPL
167135	2003 SE_{178}	—	September 19, 2003	Palomar	NEAT	PAD	4.0 km	MPC · JPL
167136	2003 SG_{178}	—	September 19, 2003	Palomar	NEAT	·	1.8 km	MPC · JPL
167137	2003 SS_{184}	—	September 21, 2003	Kitt Peak	Spacewatch	·	2.1 km	MPC · JPL
167138	2003 SP_{195}	—	September 20, 2003	Palomar	NEAT	V	1.3 km	MPC · JPL
167139	2003 SU_{195}	—	September 20, 2003	Haleakala	NEAT	·	3.5 km	MPC · JPL
167140	2003 SP_{196}	—	September 20, 2003	Palomar	NEAT	·	1.9 km	MPC · JPL
167141	2003 SZ_{196}	—	September 21, 2003	Anderson Mesa	LONEOS	·	2.5 km	MPC · JPL
167142	2003 SV_{199}	—	September 21, 2003	Anderson Mesa	LONEOS	·	2.4 km	MPC · JPL
167143	2003 SD_{200}	—	September 21, 2003	Anderson Mesa	LONEOS	·	2.8 km	MPC · JPL
167144	2003 SG_{200}	—	September 25, 2003	Palomar	NEAT	ERI	3.6 km	MPC · JPL
167145	2003 SS_{205}	—	September 25, 2003	Haleakala	NEAT	·	1.9 km	MPC · JPL
167146	2003 ST_{207}	—	September 26, 2003	Socorro	LINEAR	(5)	1.8 km	MPC · JPL
167147	2003 SZ_{207}	—	September 26, 2003	Socorro	LINEAR	·	1.9 km	MPC · JPL
167148	2003 SO_{208}	—	September 23, 2003	Palomar	NEAT	·	1.5 km	MPC · JPL
167149	2003 SR_{210}	—	September 23, 2003	Palomar	NEAT	V	1.0 km	MPC · JPL
167150	2003 SR_{211}	—	September 25, 2003	Palomar	NEAT	·	2.2 km	MPC · JPL
167151	2003 SH_{212}	—	September 25, 2003	Palomar	NEAT	·	3.6 km	MPC · JPL
167152	2003 SM_{213}	—	September 26, 2003	Socorro	LINEAR	·	4.2 km	MPC · JPL
167153	2003 SA_{218}	—	September 27, 2003	Desert Eagle	W. K. Y. Yeung	·	1.9 km	MPC · JPL
167154	2003 SC_{218}	—	September 27, 2003	Desert Eagle	W. K. Y. Yeung	·	2.0 km	MPC · JPL
167155	2003 SU_{218}	—	September 28, 2003	Desert Eagle	W. K. Y. Yeung	·	3.4 km	MPC · JPL
167156	2003 SA_{228}	—	September 27, 2003	Socorro	LINEAR	·	3.2 km	MPC · JPL
167157	2003 SA_{234}	—	September 25, 2003	Palomar	NEAT	·	2.3 km	MPC · JPL
167158	2003 SD_{235}	—	September 26, 2003	Socorro	LINEAR	·	1.5 km	MPC · JPL
167159	2003 SH_{235}	—	September 27, 2003	Socorro	LINEAR	V	800 m	MPC · JPL
167160	2003 SY_{238}	—	September 27, 2003	Socorro	LINEAR	·	2.6 km	MPC · JPL
167161	2003 SU_{244}	—	September 26, 2003	Socorro	LINEAR	·	2.1 km	MPC · JPL
167162	2003 SW_{246}	—	September 26, 2003	Socorro	LINEAR	fast	2.1 km	MPC · JPL
167163	2003 SG_{247}	—	September 26, 2003	Socorro	LINEAR	EUN	1.3 km	MPC · JPL
167164	2003 ST_{247}	—	September 26, 2003	Socorro	LINEAR	NYS ·	2.8 km	MPC · JPL
167165	2003 SY_{247}	—	September 26, 2003	Socorro	LINEAR	·	2.2 km	MPC · JPL
167166	2003 SR_{248}	—	September 26, 2003	Socorro	LINEAR	·	4.3 km	MPC · JPL
167167	2003 SZ_{249}	—	September 26, 2003	Socorro	LINEAR	·	3.6 km	MPC · JPL
167168	2003 SP_{250}	—	September 26, 2003	Socorro	LINEAR	(5)	1.7 km	MPC · JPL
167169	2003 SH_{251}	—	September 26, 2003	Socorro	LINEAR	·	3.6 km	MPC · JPL
167170	2003 SC_{252}	—	September 26, 2003	Socorro	LINEAR	·	3.4 km	MPC · JPL
167171	2003 SP_{257}	—	September 28, 2003	Socorro	LINEAR	·	1.5 km	MPC · JPL
167172	2003 SV_{257}	—	September 28, 2003	Socorro	LINEAR	NYS	2.1 km	MPC · JPL
167173	2003 SN_{258}	—	September 28, 2003	Kitt Peak	Spacewatch	RAF	2.2 km	MPC · JPL
167174	2003 SL_{260}	—	September 27, 2003	Kitt Peak	Spacewatch	·	2.0 km	MPC · JPL
167175	2003 SO_{266}	—	September 29, 2003	Socorro	LINEAR	·	2.8 km	MPC · JPL
167176	2003 SO_{269}	—	September 28, 2003	Goodricke-Pigott	R. A. Tucker	·	2.1 km	MPC · JPL
167177	2003 SD_{271}	—	September 25, 2003	Haleakala	NEAT	·	2.0 km	MPC · JPL
167178	2003 SF_{272}	—	September 27, 2003	Socorro	LINEAR	·	1.9 km	MPC · JPL
167179	2003 SK_{273}	—	September 27, 2003	Socorro	LINEAR	·	3.3 km	MPC · JPL
167180	2003 SR_{273}	—	September 28, 2003	Kitt Peak	Spacewatch	PHO	1.7 km	MPC · JPL
167181	2003 SH_{277}	—	September 30, 2003	Socorro	LINEAR	·	2.7 km	MPC · JPL
167182	2003 SK_{281}	—	September 19, 2003	Kitt Peak	Spacewatch	·	2.8 km	MPC · JPL
167183	2003 SU_{284}	—	September 20, 2003	Socorro	LINEAR	·	5.3 km	MPC · JPL
167184	2003 SO_{286}	—	September 21, 2003	Palomar	NEAT	·	3.5 km	MPC · JPL
167185	2003 SZ_{287}	—	September 30, 2003	Socorro	LINEAR	·	2.3 km	MPC · JPL
167186	2003 SO_{288}	—	September 28, 2003	Socorro	LINEAR	·	2.2 km	MPC · JPL
167187	2003 SX_{294}	—	September 28, 2003	Socorro	LINEAR	·	5.3 km	MPC · JPL
167188	2003 SA_{295}	—	September 28, 2003	Socorro	LINEAR	EUN	2.7 km	MPC · JPL
167189	2003 SS_{299}	—	September 30, 2003	Socorro	LINEAR	EUN	4.8 km	MPC · JPL
167190	2003 SR_{302}	—	September 17, 2003	Palomar	NEAT	·	2.1 km	MPC · JPL
167191	2003 SQ_{306}	—	September 30, 2003	Socorro	LINEAR	·	5.0 km	MPC · JPL
167192	2003 SU_{309}	—	September 27, 2003	Socorro	LINEAR	·	1.3 km	MPC · JPL
167193	2003 SD_{322}	—	September 27, 2003	Socorro	LINEAR	·	2.3 km	MPC · JPL
167194	2003 SL_{322}	—	September 28, 2003	Socorro	LINEAR	·	3.9 km	MPC · JPL
167195	2003 TP_{1}	—	October 2, 2003	Kitt Peak	Spacewatch	·	4.5 km	MPC · JPL
167196	2003 TN_{5}	—	October 2, 2003	Socorro	LINEAR	·	3.0 km	MPC · JPL
167197	2003 TO_{5}	—	October 2, 2003	Socorro	LINEAR	EUN	2.2 km	MPC · JPL
167198	2003 TV_{7}	—	October 1, 2003	Anderson Mesa	LONEOS	·	2.5 km	MPC · JPL
167199	2003 TT_{14}	—	October 14, 2003	Anderson Mesa	LONEOS	·	2.0 km	MPC · JPL
167200	2003 TO_{18}	—	October 15, 2003	Anderson Mesa	LONEOS	·	1.8 km	MPC · JPL

== 167201–167300 ==
back to top

Designation			Discovery			Properties		Ref
Permanent	Provisional	Named after	Date	Site	Discoverer(s)	Category	Diam.	Ref
167201	2003 TE_{20}	—	October 14, 2003	Palomar	NEAT	·	2.7 km	MPC · JPL
167202	2003 TO_{20}	—	October 14, 2003	Palomar	NEAT	·	5.9 km	MPC · JPL
167203	2003 TW_{20}	—	October 15, 2003	Anderson Mesa	LONEOS	·	4.8 km	MPC · JPL
167204	2003 TO_{33}	—	October 1, 2003	Kitt Peak	Spacewatch	·	1.4 km	MPC · JPL
167205	2003 TR_{43}	—	October 2, 2003	Kitt Peak	Spacewatch	NEM	3.3 km	MPC · JPL
167206	2003 TP_{52}	—	October 5, 2003	Kitt Peak	Spacewatch	NYS	1.7 km	MPC · JPL
167207	2003 UH_{1}	—	October 16, 2003	Palomar	NEAT	·	1.8 km	MPC · JPL
167208 Lelekovice	2003 UN_{7}	Lelekovice	October 17, 2003	Ondřejov	P. Kušnirák, K. Hornoch	·	2.1 km	MPC · JPL
167209	2003 UX_{13}	—	October 16, 2003	Palomar	NEAT	·	2.9 km	MPC · JPL
167210	2003 UN_{14}	—	October 16, 2003	Kitt Peak	Spacewatch	·	2.7 km	MPC · JPL
167211	2003 UO_{16}	—	October 16, 2003	Anderson Mesa	LONEOS	(5)	1.4 km	MPC · JPL
167212	2003 UQ_{18}	—	October 19, 2003	Anderson Mesa	LONEOS	·	4.4 km	MPC · JPL
167213	2003 UC_{19}	—	October 20, 2003	Palomar	NEAT	·	2.0 km	MPC · JPL
167214	2003 UA_{22}	—	October 22, 2003	Anderson Mesa	LONEOS	·	2.7 km	MPC · JPL
167215	2003 UC_{23}	—	October 21, 2003	Socorro	LINEAR	(5)	1.6 km	MPC · JPL
167216	2003 UH_{26}	—	October 24, 2003	Haleakala	NEAT	·	2.2 km	MPC · JPL
167217	2003 US_{28}	—	October 21, 2003	Anderson Mesa	LONEOS	·	1.8 km	MPC · JPL
167218	2003 UY_{30}	—	October 16, 2003	Kitt Peak	Spacewatch	·	1.7 km	MPC · JPL
167219	2003 UH_{31}	—	October 16, 2003	Kitt Peak	Spacewatch	NYS	1.9 km	MPC · JPL
167220	2003 UQ_{32}	—	October 16, 2003	Kitt Peak	Spacewatch	·	2.2 km	MPC · JPL
167221	2003 UA_{33}	—	October 16, 2003	Kitt Peak	Spacewatch	·	2.1 km	MPC · JPL
167222	2003 UT_{39}	—	October 16, 2003	Kitt Peak	Spacewatch	fast	3.5 km	MPC · JPL
167223	2003 UE_{40}	—	October 16, 2003	Kitt Peak	Spacewatch	AGN	1.7 km	MPC · JPL
167224	2003 UD_{41}	—	October 16, 2003	Anderson Mesa	LONEOS	·	2.1 km	MPC · JPL
167225	2003 UJ_{45}	—	October 18, 2003	Kitt Peak	Spacewatch	·	2.2 km	MPC · JPL
167226	2003 UP_{45}	—	October 18, 2003	Kitt Peak	Spacewatch	·	2.6 km	MPC · JPL
167227	2003 UT_{47}	—	October 18, 2003	Anderson Mesa	LONEOS	HNS	2.2 km	MPC · JPL
167228	2003 UF_{53}	—	October 18, 2003	Palomar	NEAT	·	2.9 km	MPC · JPL
167229	2003 UM_{56}	—	October 22, 2003	Socorro	LINEAR	·	1.9 km	MPC · JPL
167230	2003 UJ_{57}	—	October 26, 2003	Kvistaberg	Uppsala-DLR Asteroid Survey	·	3.0 km	MPC · JPL
167231	2003 UE_{58}	—	October 16, 2003	Kitt Peak	Spacewatch	EUN	1.5 km	MPC · JPL
167232	2003 UC_{59}	—	October 16, 2003	Palomar	NEAT	EUN	2.3 km	MPC · JPL
167233	2003 UX_{61}	—	October 16, 2003	Anderson Mesa	LONEOS	·	3.6 km	MPC · JPL
167234	2003 UB_{63}	—	October 16, 2003	Palomar	NEAT	·	1.7 km	MPC · JPL
167235	2003 UJ_{64}	—	October 16, 2003	Anderson Mesa	LONEOS	·	2.7 km	MPC · JPL
167236	2003 UO_{64}	—	October 16, 2003	Palomar	NEAT	·	3.7 km	MPC · JPL
167237	2003 UJ_{70}	—	October 18, 2003	Kitt Peak	Spacewatch	·	1.6 km	MPC · JPL
167238	2003 UY_{73}	—	October 16, 2003	Palomar	NEAT	·	2.0 km	MPC · JPL
167239	2003 UZ_{75}	—	October 17, 2003	Kitt Peak	Spacewatch	·	2.1 km	MPC · JPL
167240	2003 UU_{81}	—	October 18, 2003	Kitt Peak	Spacewatch	NYS	1.4 km	MPC · JPL
167241	2003 UC_{91}	—	October 20, 2003	Socorro	LINEAR	·	3.6 km	MPC · JPL
167242	2003 US_{91}	—	October 20, 2003	Kitt Peak	Spacewatch	·	2.5 km	MPC · JPL
167243	2003 UQ_{94}	—	October 18, 2003	Kitt Peak	Spacewatch	EUN	2.3 km	MPC · JPL
167244	2003 UB_{95}	—	October 18, 2003	Kitt Peak	Spacewatch	·	2.2 km	MPC · JPL
167245	2003 UR_{96}	—	October 19, 2003	Kitt Peak	Spacewatch	·	2.2 km	MPC · JPL
167246	2003 UX_{96}	—	October 19, 2003	Kitt Peak	Spacewatch	·	2.5 km	MPC · JPL
167247	2003 UU_{97}	—	October 19, 2003	Kitt Peak	Spacewatch	·	2.2 km	MPC · JPL
167248	2003 UL_{99}	—	October 19, 2003	Anderson Mesa	LONEOS	·	2.6 km	MPC · JPL
167249	2003 UP_{99}	—	October 19, 2003	Anderson Mesa	LONEOS	·	3.1 km	MPC · JPL
167250	2003 UQ_{99}	—	October 19, 2003	Anderson Mesa	LONEOS	·	3.9 km	MPC · JPL
167251	2003 UJ_{104}	—	October 18, 2003	Kitt Peak	Spacewatch	·	1.3 km	MPC · JPL
167252	2003 UP_{109}	—	October 19, 2003	Kitt Peak	Spacewatch	NEM	3.9 km	MPC · JPL
167253	2003 UY_{109}	—	October 19, 2003	Kitt Peak	Spacewatch	·	1.9 km	MPC · JPL
167254	2003 UU_{113}	—	October 20, 2003	Socorro	LINEAR	·	3.7 km	MPC · JPL
167255	2003 UT_{115}	—	October 20, 2003	Palomar	NEAT	·	5.3 km	MPC · JPL
167256	2003 UE_{117}	—	October 21, 2003	Socorro	LINEAR	RAF	1.2 km	MPC · JPL
167257	2003 UG_{118}	—	October 17, 2003	Anderson Mesa	LONEOS	NEM	3.1 km	MPC · JPL
167258	2003 UH_{120}	—	October 18, 2003	Kitt Peak	Spacewatch	NEM	2.8 km	MPC · JPL
167259	2003 UF_{121}	—	October 18, 2003	Palomar	NEAT	·	2.6 km	MPC · JPL
167260	2003 UM_{122}	—	October 19, 2003	Kitt Peak	Spacewatch	·	1.6 km	MPC · JPL
167261	2003 UT_{122}	—	October 19, 2003	Socorro	LINEAR	·	2.9 km	MPC · JPL
167262	2003 UN_{123}	—	October 19, 2003	Kitt Peak	Spacewatch	EUN	1.8 km	MPC · JPL
167263	2003 UC_{127}	—	October 21, 2003	Kitt Peak	Spacewatch	(5)	1.5 km	MPC · JPL
167264	2003 UH_{127}	—	October 21, 2003	Kitt Peak	Spacewatch	·	1.8 km	MPC · JPL
167265	2003 UH_{129}	—	October 18, 2003	Palomar	NEAT	·	2.9 km	MPC · JPL
167266	2003 UN_{129}	—	October 18, 2003	Palomar	NEAT	·	2.8 km	MPC · JPL
167267	2003 UW_{131}	—	October 19, 2003	Palomar	NEAT	MAR	2.4 km	MPC · JPL
167268	2003 UN_{137}	—	October 21, 2003	Socorro	LINEAR	·	1.5 km	MPC · JPL
167269	2003 UP_{142}	—	October 18, 2003	Anderson Mesa	LONEOS	RAF	1.5 km	MPC · JPL
167270	2003 UQ_{146}	—	October 18, 2003	Anderson Mesa	LONEOS	·	2.3 km	MPC · JPL
167271	2003 UY_{146}	—	October 18, 2003	Anderson Mesa	LONEOS	ADE	3.1 km	MPC · JPL
167272	2003 UP_{147}	—	October 18, 2003	Kitt Peak	Spacewatch	·	1.7 km	MPC · JPL
167273	2003 UK_{148}	—	October 19, 2003	Anderson Mesa	LONEOS	·	2.7 km	MPC · JPL
167274	2003 UT_{148}	—	October 19, 2003	Kitt Peak	Spacewatch	·	2.4 km	MPC · JPL
167275	2003 UU_{148}	—	October 19, 2003	Kitt Peak	Spacewatch	·	2.2 km	MPC · JPL
167276	2003 UR_{150}	—	October 20, 2003	Kitt Peak	Spacewatch	·	3.9 km	MPC · JPL
167277	2003 US_{150}	—	October 21, 2003	Kitt Peak	Spacewatch	·	1.4 km	MPC · JPL
167278	2003 UZ_{161}	—	October 21, 2003	Socorro	LINEAR	·	3.3 km	MPC · JPL
167279	2003 UD_{166}	—	October 21, 2003	Kitt Peak	Spacewatch	·	1.9 km	MPC · JPL
167280	2003 UB_{168}	—	October 22, 2003	Socorro	LINEAR	(5)	1.7 km	MPC · JPL
167281	2003 UB_{169}	—	October 22, 2003	Socorro	LINEAR	EUN	1.7 km	MPC · JPL
167282	2003 UT_{169}	—	October 22, 2003	Socorro	LINEAR	·	2.2 km	MPC · JPL
167283	2003 UH_{170}	—	October 22, 2003	Kitt Peak	Spacewatch	·	2.4 km	MPC · JPL
167284	2003 UR_{175}	—	October 21, 2003	Palomar	NEAT	·	1.7 km	MPC · JPL
167285	2003 UP_{180}	—	October 21, 2003	Socorro	LINEAR	·	4.1 km	MPC · JPL
167286	2003 UZ_{180}	—	October 21, 2003	Kitt Peak	Spacewatch	·	3.8 km	MPC · JPL
167287	2003 UF_{181}	—	October 21, 2003	Socorro	LINEAR	·	2.6 km	MPC · JPL
167288	2003 US_{189}	—	October 22, 2003	Haleakala	NEAT	·	3.0 km	MPC · JPL
167289	2003 UX_{195}	—	October 20, 2003	Kitt Peak	Spacewatch	·	2.7 km	MPC · JPL
167290	2003 UU_{196}	—	October 21, 2003	Kitt Peak	Spacewatch	(12739)	2.5 km	MPC · JPL
167291	2003 UX_{199}	—	October 21, 2003	Socorro	LINEAR	·	1.9 km	MPC · JPL
167292	2003 UD_{200}	—	October 21, 2003	Socorro	LINEAR	·	1.3 km	MPC · JPL
167293	2003 UN_{205}	—	October 22, 2003	Socorro	LINEAR	RAF	1.6 km	MPC · JPL
167294	2003 UB_{206}	—	October 22, 2003	Socorro	LINEAR	·	2.1 km	MPC · JPL
167295	2003 UC_{209}	—	October 23, 2003	Kitt Peak	Spacewatch	HOF	4.7 km	MPC · JPL
167296	2003 UF_{210}	—	October 23, 2003	Anderson Mesa	LONEOS	(5)	1.7 km	MPC · JPL
167297	2003 UD_{211}	—	October 23, 2003	Kitt Peak	Spacewatch	·	3.1 km	MPC · JPL
167298	2003 UA_{213}	—	October 23, 2003	Kitt Peak	Spacewatch	·	3.5 km	MPC · JPL
167299	2003 UR_{215}	—	October 21, 2003	Kitt Peak	Spacewatch	·	2.0 km	MPC · JPL
167300	2003 UV_{216}	—	October 21, 2003	Socorro	LINEAR	·	1.7 km	MPC · JPL

== 167301–167400 ==
back to top

Designation			Discovery			Properties		Ref
Permanent	Provisional	Named after	Date	Site	Discoverer(s)	Category	Diam.	Ref
167301	2003 UB_{217}	—	October 21, 2003	Palomar	NEAT	·	1.8 km	MPC · JPL
167302	2003 UG_{218}	—	October 21, 2003	Socorro	LINEAR	PAD	3.8 km	MPC · JPL
167303	2003 UJ_{222}	—	October 22, 2003	Socorro	LINEAR	·	3.5 km	MPC · JPL
167304	2003 UE_{223}	—	October 22, 2003	Socorro	LINEAR	·	2.4 km	MPC · JPL
167305	2003 UO_{227}	—	October 23, 2003	Kitt Peak	Spacewatch	·	2.3 km	MPC · JPL
167306	2003 UU_{228}	—	October 23, 2003	Anderson Mesa	LONEOS	·	3.7 km	MPC · JPL
167307	2003 UX_{232}	—	October 24, 2003	Socorro	LINEAR	·	1.3 km	MPC · JPL
167308	2003 UD_{233}	—	October 24, 2003	Kitt Peak	Spacewatch	·	3.9 km	MPC · JPL
167309	2003 UQ_{237}	—	October 23, 2003	Kitt Peak	Spacewatch	·	2.6 km	MPC · JPL
167310	2003 UP_{238}	—	October 24, 2003	Socorro	LINEAR	·	2.6 km	MPC · JPL
167311	2003 UE_{240}	—	October 24, 2003	Socorro	LINEAR	·	1.9 km	MPC · JPL
167312	2003 UG_{240}	—	October 24, 2003	Socorro	LINEAR	·	1.9 km	MPC · JPL
167313	2003 UV_{243}	—	October 24, 2003	Socorro	LINEAR	·	2.2 km	MPC · JPL
167314	2003 UU_{246}	—	October 24, 2003	Socorro	LINEAR	·	2.5 km	MPC · JPL
167315	2003 UA_{247}	—	October 24, 2003	Socorro	LINEAR	·	2.2 km	MPC · JPL
167316	2003 UH_{247}	—	October 24, 2003	Socorro	LINEAR	(5)	1.8 km	MPC · JPL
167317	2003 UD_{250}	—	October 25, 2003	Socorro	LINEAR	EUN	2.3 km	MPC · JPL
167318	2003 UO_{252}	—	October 26, 2003	Kitt Peak	Spacewatch	PAD	4.3 km	MPC · JPL
167319	2003 UH_{256}	—	October 25, 2003	Socorro	LINEAR	·	4.4 km	MPC · JPL
167320	2003 UV_{257}	—	October 25, 2003	Socorro	LINEAR	·	2.4 km	MPC · JPL
167321	2003 UO_{259}	—	October 25, 2003	Socorro	LINEAR	·	2.0 km	MPC · JPL
167322	2003 UU_{259}	—	October 25, 2003	Socorro	LINEAR	·	2.2 km	MPC · JPL
167323	2003 UE_{263}	—	October 27, 2003	Anderson Mesa	LONEOS	EUN	2.1 km	MPC · JPL
167324	2003 UG_{263}	—	October 27, 2003	Anderson Mesa	LONEOS	·	3.7 km	MPC · JPL
167325	2003 UM_{264}	—	October 27, 2003	Socorro	LINEAR	·	1.8 km	MPC · JPL
167326	2003 UV_{267}	—	October 28, 2003	Socorro	LINEAR	·	4.8 km	MPC · JPL
167327	2003 UU_{268}	—	October 28, 2003	Socorro	LINEAR	·	3.4 km	MPC · JPL
167328	2003 UU_{270}	—	October 17, 2003	Palomar	NEAT	·	2.0 km	MPC · JPL
167329	2003 UC_{275}	—	October 29, 2003	Socorro	LINEAR	·	2.0 km	MPC · JPL
167330	2003 UT_{276}	—	October 30, 2003	Socorro	LINEAR	·	4.4 km	MPC · JPL
167331	2003 UX_{276}	—	October 30, 2003	Socorro	LINEAR	EUN	2.1 km	MPC · JPL
167332	2003 UG_{280}	—	October 27, 2003	Socorro	LINEAR	·	1.5 km	MPC · JPL
167333	2003 UM_{280}	—	October 27, 2003	Socorro	LINEAR	·	1.9 km	MPC · JPL
167334	2003 UF_{281}	—	October 28, 2003	Socorro	LINEAR	·	3.0 km	MPC · JPL
167335	2003 UH_{283}	—	October 29, 2003	Anderson Mesa	LONEOS	·	1.9 km	MPC · JPL
167336	2003 UA_{289}	—	October 23, 2003	Kitt Peak	M. W. Buie	·	1.4 km	MPC · JPL
167337	2003 UY_{289}	—	October 23, 2003	Kitt Peak	M. W. Buie	·	1.8 km	MPC · JPL
167338	2003 UR_{299}	—	October 16, 2003	Kitt Peak	Spacewatch	MIS	2.7 km	MPC · JPL
167339	2003 UN_{308}	—	October 19, 2003	Kitt Peak	Spacewatch	·	2.2 km	MPC · JPL
167340	2003 UT_{314}	—	October 16, 2003	Anderson Mesa	LONEOS	·	2.1 km	MPC · JPL
167341 Börzsöny	2003 VG	Börzsöny	November 3, 2003	Piszkéstető	K. Sárneczky	·	2.7 km	MPC · JPL
167342	2003 VS_{1}	—	November 1, 2003	Socorro	LINEAR	·	2.5 km	MPC · JPL
167343	2003 VN_{7}	—	November 15, 2003	Kitt Peak	Spacewatch	·	1.7 km	MPC · JPL
167344	2003 VX_{7}	—	November 9, 2003	Haleakala	NEAT	·	3.8 km	MPC · JPL
167345	2003 VG_{8}	—	November 14, 2003	Palomar	NEAT	RAF	1.9 km	MPC · JPL
167346	2003 VU_{8}	—	November 15, 2003	Kitt Peak	Spacewatch	NYS	2.0 km	MPC · JPL
167347	2003 WZ_{5}	—	November 18, 2003	Palomar	NEAT	(5)	2.6 km	MPC · JPL
167348	2003 WV_{8}	—	November 16, 2003	Kitt Peak	Spacewatch	ADE	4.5 km	MPC · JPL
167349	2003 WA_{9}	—	November 16, 2003	Kitt Peak	Spacewatch	·	4.2 km	MPC · JPL
167350	2003 WL_{9}	—	November 18, 2003	Kitt Peak	Spacewatch	·	6.3 km	MPC · JPL
167351	2003 WY_{16}	—	November 18, 2003	Palomar	NEAT	·	1.7 km	MPC · JPL
167352	2003 WJ_{26}	—	November 19, 2003	Palomar	NEAT	JUN	1.6 km	MPC · JPL
167353	2003 WR_{27}	—	November 16, 2003	Kitt Peak	Spacewatch	·	3.2 km	MPC · JPL
167354	2003 WE_{28}	—	November 16, 2003	Kitt Peak	Spacewatch	·	2.6 km	MPC · JPL
167355	2003 WZ_{30}	—	November 18, 2003	Palomar	NEAT	·	5.1 km	MPC · JPL
167356	2003 WA_{32}	—	November 18, 2003	Palomar	NEAT	·	2.7 km	MPC · JPL
167357	2003 WM_{34}	—	November 19, 2003	Kitt Peak	Spacewatch	·	2.4 km	MPC · JPL
167358	2003 WD_{36}	—	November 19, 2003	Kitt Peak	Spacewatch	·	3.6 km	MPC · JPL
167359	2003 WN_{38}	—	November 19, 2003	Socorro	LINEAR	·	4.1 km	MPC · JPL
167360	2003 WQ_{40}	—	November 19, 2003	Kitt Peak	Spacewatch	·	2.6 km	MPC · JPL
167361	2003 WK_{42}	—	November 21, 2003	Socorro	LINEAR	·	2.4 km	MPC · JPL
167362	2003 WD_{45}	—	November 19, 2003	Palomar	NEAT	·	2.7 km	MPC · JPL
167363	2003 WH_{46}	—	November 18, 2003	Catalina	CSS	PAD	4.4 km	MPC · JPL
167364	2003 WJ_{47}	—	November 18, 2003	Palomar	NEAT	·	4.7 km	MPC · JPL
167365	2003 WS_{48}	—	November 19, 2003	Catalina	CSS	·	2.1 km	MPC · JPL
167366	2003 WL_{49}	—	November 19, 2003	Socorro	LINEAR	·	2.9 km	MPC · JPL
167367	2003 WQ_{54}	—	November 20, 2003	Socorro	LINEAR	·	3.1 km	MPC · JPL
167368	2003 WG_{58}	—	November 18, 2003	Kitt Peak	Spacewatch	·	3.4 km	MPC · JPL
167369	2003 WE_{60}	—	November 18, 2003	Palomar	NEAT	·	1.9 km	MPC · JPL
167370	2003 WB_{61}	—	November 19, 2003	Kitt Peak	Spacewatch	·	2.0 km	MPC · JPL
167371	2003 WC_{61}	—	November 19, 2003	Kitt Peak	Spacewatch	·	2.5 km	MPC · JPL
167372	2003 WK_{62}	—	November 19, 2003	Kitt Peak	Spacewatch	KOR	2.1 km	MPC · JPL
167373	2003 WM_{64}	—	November 19, 2003	Kitt Peak	Spacewatch	·	3.8 km	MPC · JPL
167374	2003 WM_{65}	—	November 19, 2003	Kitt Peak	Spacewatch	·	2.6 km	MPC · JPL
167375	2003 WF_{66}	—	November 19, 2003	Socorro	LINEAR	·	3.7 km	MPC · JPL
167376	2003 WH_{67}	—	November 19, 2003	Kitt Peak	Spacewatch	·	2.5 km	MPC · JPL
167377	2003 WJ_{67}	—	November 19, 2003	Kitt Peak	Spacewatch	·	2.1 km	MPC · JPL
167378	2003 WM_{67}	—	November 19, 2003	Kitt Peak	Spacewatch	·	3.7 km	MPC · JPL
167379	2003 WW_{67}	—	November 19, 2003	Kitt Peak	Spacewatch	·	2.9 km	MPC · JPL
167380	2003 WF_{68}	—	November 19, 2003	Kitt Peak	Spacewatch	·	2.1 km	MPC · JPL
167381	2003 WL_{72}	—	November 20, 2003	Socorro	LINEAR	·	2.1 km	MPC · JPL
167382	2003 WM_{72}	—	November 20, 2003	Socorro	LINEAR	·	1.9 km	MPC · JPL
167383	2003 WY_{73}	—	November 20, 2003	Socorro	LINEAR	(5)	3.2 km	MPC · JPL
167384	2003 WC_{75}	—	November 20, 2003	Socorro	LINEAR	ADE	4.1 km	MPC · JPL
167385	2003 WX_{78}	—	November 20, 2003	Socorro	LINEAR	·	1.8 km	MPC · JPL
167386	2003 WB_{79}	—	November 20, 2003	Socorro	LINEAR	·	2.1 km	MPC · JPL
167387	2003 WN_{80}	—	November 20, 2003	Socorro	LINEAR	·	5.3 km	MPC · JPL
167388	2003 WW_{84}	—	November 19, 2003	Catalina	CSS	·	4.2 km	MPC · JPL
167389	2003 WN_{88}	—	November 23, 2003	Needville	J. Dellinger	·	2.9 km	MPC · JPL
167390	2003 WT_{88}	—	November 16, 2003	Kitt Peak	Spacewatch	·	2.3 km	MPC · JPL
167391	2003 WN_{91}	—	November 18, 2003	Kitt Peak	Spacewatch	·	3.5 km	MPC · JPL
167392	2003 WV_{93}	—	November 19, 2003	Anderson Mesa	LONEOS	·	1.8 km	MPC · JPL
167393	2003 WK_{95}	—	November 19, 2003	Anderson Mesa	LONEOS	·	2.5 km	MPC · JPL
167394	2003 WU_{95}	—	November 19, 2003	Anderson Mesa	LONEOS	·	2.9 km	MPC · JPL
167395	2003 WX_{96}	—	November 19, 2003	Anderson Mesa	LONEOS	ADE	5.7 km	MPC · JPL
167396	2003 WZ_{98}	—	November 20, 2003	Socorro	LINEAR	·	3.6 km	MPC · JPL
167397	2003 WL_{100}	—	November 20, 2003	Socorro	LINEAR	·	4.7 km	MPC · JPL
167398	2003 WN_{101}	—	November 21, 2003	Catalina	CSS	·	2.4 km	MPC · JPL
167399	2003 WX_{101}	—	November 21, 2003	Socorro	LINEAR	fast	2.7 km	MPC · JPL
167400	2003 WZ_{101}	—	November 21, 2003	Socorro	LINEAR	AGN	1.8 km	MPC · JPL

== 167401–167500 ==
back to top

Designation			Discovery			Properties		Ref
Permanent	Provisional	Named after	Date	Site	Discoverer(s)	Category	Diam.	Ref
167401	2003 WS_{112}	—	November 20, 2003	Socorro	LINEAR	AGN	1.7 km	MPC · JPL
167402	2003 WB_{113}	—	November 20, 2003	Socorro	LINEAR	EUN	2.8 km	MPC · JPL
167403	2003 WK_{116}	—	November 20, 2003	Socorro	LINEAR	·	3.2 km	MPC · JPL
167404	2003 WL_{116}	—	November 20, 2003	Socorro	LINEAR	·	2.2 km	MPC · JPL
167405	2003 WP_{118}	—	November 20, 2003	Socorro	LINEAR	·	2.6 km	MPC · JPL
167406	2003 WU_{118}	—	November 20, 2003	Socorro	LINEAR	(5)	2.3 km	MPC · JPL
167407	2003 WH_{120}	—	November 20, 2003	Socorro	LINEAR	·	4.9 km	MPC · JPL
167408	2003 WH_{124}	—	November 20, 2003	Socorro	LINEAR	·	3.1 km	MPC · JPL
167409	2003 WO_{125}	—	November 20, 2003	Socorro	LINEAR	·	1.7 km	MPC · JPL
167410	2003 WB_{127}	—	November 20, 2003	Socorro	LINEAR	GEF	2.1 km	MPC · JPL
167411	2003 WW_{130}	—	November 21, 2003	Palomar	NEAT	WIT	1.6 km	MPC · JPL
167412	2003 WQ_{131}	—	November 21, 2003	Palomar	NEAT	·	2.4 km	MPC · JPL
167413	2003 WJ_{132}	—	November 19, 2003	Kitt Peak	Spacewatch	(5)	2.2 km	MPC · JPL
167414	2003 WA_{134}	—	November 21, 2003	Socorro	LINEAR	·	3.1 km	MPC · JPL
167415	2003 WZ_{134}	—	November 21, 2003	Socorro	LINEAR	·	2.3 km	MPC · JPL
167416	2003 WY_{135}	—	November 21, 2003	Socorro	LINEAR	·	2.6 km	MPC · JPL
167417	2003 WP_{139}	—	November 21, 2003	Socorro	LINEAR	EUN	2.9 km	MPC · JPL
167418	2003 WF_{141}	—	November 21, 2003	Socorro	LINEAR	EUN	2.9 km	MPC · JPL
167419	2003 WP_{141}	—	November 21, 2003	Socorro	LINEAR	·	2.0 km	MPC · JPL
167420	2003 WT_{143}	—	November 20, 2003	Socorro	LINEAR	·	1.9 km	MPC · JPL
167421	2003 WV_{143}	—	November 20, 2003	Socorro	LINEAR	·	3.8 km	MPC · JPL
167422	2003 WS_{148}	—	November 24, 2003	Palomar	NEAT	·	2.2 km	MPC · JPL
167423	2003 WH_{149}	—	November 24, 2003	Palomar	NEAT	·	3.5 km	MPC · JPL
167424	2003 WK_{150}	—	November 24, 2003	Anderson Mesa	LONEOS	·	2.7 km	MPC · JPL
167425	2003 WC_{153}	—	November 26, 2003	Anderson Mesa	LONEOS	EUN	1.9 km	MPC · JPL
167426	2003 WQ_{154}	—	November 26, 2003	Kitt Peak	Spacewatch	ADE	3.3 km	MPC · JPL
167427	2003 WP_{155}	—	November 26, 2003	Kitt Peak	Spacewatch	·	3.3 km	MPC · JPL
167428	2003 WQ_{155}	—	November 26, 2003	Kitt Peak	Spacewatch	·	2.4 km	MPC · JPL
167429	2003 WX_{157}	—	November 28, 2003	Goodricke-Pigott	R. A. Tucker	·	3.0 km	MPC · JPL
167430	2003 WW_{159}	—	November 30, 2003	Kitt Peak	Spacewatch	·	2.5 km	MPC · JPL
167431	2003 WM_{162}	—	November 30, 2003	Kitt Peak	Spacewatch	·	3.2 km	MPC · JPL
167432	2003 WD_{165}	—	November 30, 2003	Kitt Peak	Spacewatch	KOR	1.5 km	MPC · JPL
167433	2003 WW_{169}	—	November 19, 2003	Palomar	NEAT	MAR	1.8 km	MPC · JPL
167434	2003 WL_{170}	—	November 20, 2003	Palomar	NEAT	·	5.5 km	MPC · JPL
167435	2003 WO_{171}	—	November 23, 2003	Anderson Mesa	LONEOS	·	4.8 km	MPC · JPL
167436	2003 WU_{174}	—	November 19, 2003	Anderson Mesa	LONEOS	KOR	1.9 km	MPC · JPL
167437	2003 WL_{176}	—	November 19, 2003	Socorro	LINEAR	DOR	2.9 km	MPC · JPL
167438	2003 WL_{190}	—	November 26, 2003	Socorro	LINEAR	HNS	1.9 km	MPC · JPL
167439	2003 WF_{193}	—	November 18, 2003	Kitt Peak	Spacewatch	·	2.9 km	MPC · JPL
167440	2003 XT_{4}	—	December 1, 2003	Socorro	LINEAR	(5)	2.9 km	MPC · JPL
167441	2003 XC_{6}	—	December 3, 2003	Socorro	LINEAR	·	4.2 km	MPC · JPL
167442	2003 XG_{6}	—	December 3, 2003	Socorro	LINEAR	·	3.5 km	MPC · JPL
167443	2003 XX_{6}	—	December 3, 2003	Anderson Mesa	LONEOS	·	5.2 km	MPC · JPL
167444	2003 XK_{7}	—	December 1, 2003	Socorro	LINEAR	HNS	2.2 km	MPC · JPL
167445	2003 XL_{7}	—	December 1, 2003	Socorro	LINEAR	·	2.4 km	MPC · JPL
167446	2003 XH_{8}	—	December 4, 2003	Socorro	LINEAR	·	3.2 km	MPC · JPL
167447	2003 XQ_{8}	—	December 4, 2003	Socorro	LINEAR	·	3.5 km	MPC · JPL
167448	2003 XS_{8}	—	December 4, 2003	Socorro	LINEAR	·	2.3 km	MPC · JPL
167449	2003 XP_{9}	—	December 4, 2003	Socorro	LINEAR	·	3.1 km	MPC · JPL
167450	2003 XU_{9}	—	December 4, 2003	Socorro	LINEAR	·	2.3 km	MPC · JPL
167451	2003 XA_{10}	—	December 4, 2003	Socorro	LINEAR	·	2.2 km	MPC · JPL
167452	2003 XG_{17}	—	December 14, 2003	Kitt Peak	Spacewatch	·	4.4 km	MPC · JPL
167453	2003 XB_{25}	—	December 1, 2003	Socorro	LINEAR	·	1.8 km	MPC · JPL
167454	2003 XC_{37}	—	December 3, 2003	Socorro	LINEAR	·	4.0 km	MPC · JPL
167455	2003 XQ_{37}	—	December 4, 2003	Socorro	LINEAR	·	2.2 km	MPC · JPL
167456	2003 YP	—	December 16, 2003	Anderson Mesa	LONEOS	·	3.8 km	MPC · JPL
167457	2003 YD_{3}	—	December 17, 2003	Anderson Mesa	LONEOS	URS	5.6 km	MPC · JPL
167458	2003 YE_{3}	—	December 18, 2003	Socorro	LINEAR	·	4.6 km	MPC · JPL
167459	2003 YY_{6}	—	December 17, 2003	Socorro	LINEAR	·	5.4 km	MPC · JPL
167460	2003 YO_{7}	—	December 18, 2003	Socorro	LINEAR	·	6.1 km	MPC · JPL
167461	2003 YX_{15}	—	December 17, 2003	Anderson Mesa	LONEOS	·	3.9 km	MPC · JPL
167462	2003 YP_{16}	—	December 17, 2003	Kitt Peak	Spacewatch	·	3.0 km	MPC · JPL
167463	2003 YU_{20}	—	December 17, 2003	Kitt Peak	Spacewatch	·	2.7 km	MPC · JPL
167464	2003 YF_{21}	—	December 17, 2003	Kitt Peak	Spacewatch	·	2.0 km	MPC · JPL
167465	2003 YP_{21}	—	December 17, 2003	Kitt Peak	Spacewatch	·	2.8 km	MPC · JPL
167466	2003 YA_{24}	—	December 17, 2003	Socorro	LINEAR	EUN	2.2 km	MPC · JPL
167467	2003 YB_{27}	—	December 16, 2003	Anderson Mesa	LONEOS	·	4.5 km	MPC · JPL
167468	2003 YR_{28}	—	December 17, 2003	Kitt Peak	Spacewatch	·	2.9 km	MPC · JPL
167469	2003 YW_{33}	—	December 17, 2003	Kitt Peak	Spacewatch	·	2.2 km	MPC · JPL
167470	2003 YK_{35}	—	December 19, 2003	Socorro	LINEAR	·	2.7 km	MPC · JPL
167471	2003 YH_{40}	—	December 19, 2003	Kitt Peak	Spacewatch	·	4.7 km	MPC · JPL
167472	2003 YU_{41}	—	December 19, 2003	Kitt Peak	Spacewatch	·	2.1 km	MPC · JPL
167473	2003 YE_{42}	—	December 19, 2003	Kitt Peak	Spacewatch	·	5.6 km	MPC · JPL
167474	2003 YM_{42}	—	December 19, 2003	Kitt Peak	Spacewatch	MRX	3.5 km	MPC · JPL
167475	2003 YW_{44}	—	December 19, 2003	Kitt Peak	Spacewatch	·	6.9 km	MPC · JPL
167476	2003 YB_{51}	—	December 18, 2003	Socorro	LINEAR	·	2.6 km	MPC · JPL
167477	2003 YV_{51}	—	December 18, 2003	Socorro	LINEAR	·	3.6 km	MPC · JPL
167478	2003 YH_{52}	—	December 18, 2003	Kitt Peak	Spacewatch	EOS	3.0 km	MPC · JPL
167479	2003 YT_{53}	—	December 19, 2003	Socorro	LINEAR	NEM	3.8 km	MPC · JPL
167480	2003 YZ_{54}	—	December 19, 2003	Socorro	LINEAR	LEO	2.2 km	MPC · JPL
167481	2003 YF_{57}	—	December 19, 2003	Socorro	LINEAR	·	3.4 km	MPC · JPL
167482	2003 YH_{57}	—	December 19, 2003	Socorro	LINEAR	·	2.9 km	MPC · JPL
167483	2003 YR_{58}	—	December 19, 2003	Socorro	LINEAR	·	3.0 km	MPC · JPL
167484	2003 YJ_{63}	—	December 19, 2003	Socorro	LINEAR	·	4.2 km	MPC · JPL
167485	2003 YS_{63}	—	December 19, 2003	Socorro	LINEAR	·	4.1 km	MPC · JPL
167486	2003 YT_{64}	—	December 19, 2003	Socorro	LINEAR	·	3.4 km	MPC · JPL
167487	2003 YE_{65}	—	December 19, 2003	Socorro	LINEAR	·	3.7 km	MPC · JPL
167488	2003 YN_{66}	—	December 20, 2003	Socorro	LINEAR	·	4.7 km	MPC · JPL
167489	2003 YX_{70}	—	December 18, 2003	Socorro	LINEAR	MIS	4.3 km	MPC · JPL
167490	2003 YU_{71}	—	December 18, 2003	Socorro	LINEAR	·	2.6 km	MPC · JPL
167491	2003 YJ_{76}	—	December 18, 2003	Socorro	LINEAR	·	4.0 km	MPC · JPL
167492	2003 YF_{80}	—	December 18, 2003	Socorro	LINEAR	·	3.6 km	MPC · JPL
167493	2003 YJ_{83}	—	December 18, 2003	Haleakala	NEAT	(5)	2.2 km	MPC · JPL
167494	2003 YO_{83}	—	December 19, 2003	Kitt Peak	Spacewatch	·	2.6 km	MPC · JPL
167495	2003 YT_{83}	—	December 19, 2003	Socorro	LINEAR	·	4.4 km	MPC · JPL
167496	2003 YE_{84}	—	December 19, 2003	Socorro	LINEAR	·	6.3 km	MPC · JPL
167497	2003 YT_{84}	—	December 19, 2003	Socorro	LINEAR	(5)	2.7 km	MPC · JPL
167498	2003 YV_{85}	—	December 19, 2003	Socorro	LINEAR	·	3.6 km	MPC · JPL
167499	2003 YR_{87}	—	December 19, 2003	Socorro	LINEAR	GEF	2.7 km	MPC · JPL
167500	2003 YX_{88}	—	December 19, 2003	Kitt Peak	Spacewatch	·	4.8 km	MPC · JPL

== 167501–167600 ==
back to top

Designation			Discovery			Properties		Ref
Permanent	Provisional	Named after	Date	Site	Discoverer(s)	Category	Diam.	Ref
167501	2003 YV_{89}	—	December 19, 2003	Kitt Peak	Spacewatch	MRX	2.0 km	MPC · JPL
167502	2003 YQ_{90}	—	December 20, 2003	Socorro	LINEAR	·	2.9 km	MPC · JPL
167503	2003 YF_{93}	—	December 21, 2003	Socorro	LINEAR	·	3.0 km	MPC · JPL
167504	2003 YW_{94}	—	December 19, 2003	Socorro	LINEAR	·	2.2 km	MPC · JPL
167505	2003 YM_{103}	—	December 20, 2003	Socorro	LINEAR	·	8.7 km	MPC · JPL
167506	2003 YB_{105}	—	December 21, 2003	Catalina	CSS	·	3.6 km	MPC · JPL
167507	2003 YY_{105}	—	December 22, 2003	Socorro	LINEAR	·	2.5 km	MPC · JPL
167508	2003 YO_{107}	—	December 17, 2003	Socorro	LINEAR	·	3.3 km	MPC · JPL
167509	2003 YS_{113}	—	December 23, 2003	Socorro	LINEAR	MAR	2.6 km	MPC · JPL
167510	2003 YE_{114}	—	December 25, 2003	Socorro	LINEAR	·	3.2 km	MPC · JPL
167511	2003 YW_{115}	—	December 27, 2003	Socorro	LINEAR	·	5.2 km	MPC · JPL
167512	2003 YN_{122}	—	December 27, 2003	Socorro	LINEAR	·	3.3 km	MPC · JPL
167513	2003 YX_{128}	—	December 27, 2003	Socorro	LINEAR	·	3.7 km	MPC · JPL
167514	2003 YT_{131}	—	December 28, 2003	Socorro	LINEAR	·	3.3 km	MPC · JPL
167515	2003 YL_{138}	—	December 27, 2003	Socorro	LINEAR	·	4.1 km	MPC · JPL
167516	2003 YO_{138}	—	December 27, 2003	Socorro	LINEAR	·	3.6 km	MPC · JPL
167517	2003 YH_{139}	—	December 28, 2003	Socorro	LINEAR	·	3.3 km	MPC · JPL
167518	2003 YP_{139}	—	December 28, 2003	Kitt Peak	Spacewatch	THM	4.3 km	MPC · JPL
167519	2003 YD_{140}	—	December 28, 2003	Socorro	LINEAR	EOS	4.0 km	MPC · JPL
167520	2003 YB_{142}	—	December 28, 2003	Socorro	LINEAR	·	3.8 km	MPC · JPL
167521	2003 YC_{147}	—	December 29, 2003	Socorro	LINEAR	526	4.2 km	MPC · JPL
167522	2003 YQ_{147}	—	December 29, 2003	Socorro	LINEAR	·	3.7 km	MPC · JPL
167523	2003 YX_{147}	—	December 29, 2003	Socorro	LINEAR	·	3.7 km	MPC · JPL
167524	2003 YZ_{147}	—	December 29, 2003	Socorro	LINEAR	·	3.1 km	MPC · JPL
167525	2003 YJ_{148}	—	December 29, 2003	Catalina	CSS	·	5.8 km	MPC · JPL
167526	2003 YF_{150}	—	December 29, 2003	Socorro	LINEAR	·	3.2 km	MPC · JPL
167527	2003 YF_{151}	—	December 29, 2003	Catalina	CSS	EUN	2.4 km	MPC · JPL
167528	2003 YO_{151}	—	December 29, 2003	Catalina	CSS	EUN	2.7 km	MPC · JPL
167529	2003 YA_{153}	—	December 29, 2003	Catalina	CSS	·	6.2 km	MPC · JPL
167530	2003 YV_{153}	—	December 29, 2003	Catalina	CSS	·	6.2 km	MPC · JPL
167531	2003 YQ_{155}	—	December 26, 2003	Haleakala	NEAT	·	4.9 km	MPC · JPL
167532	2003 YX_{155}	—	December 30, 2003	Socorro	LINEAR	EUN	2.5 km	MPC · JPL
167533	2003 YB_{159}	—	December 17, 2003	Socorro	LINEAR	·	2.7 km	MPC · JPL
167534	2003 YF_{161}	—	December 17, 2003	Kitt Peak	Spacewatch	DOR	5.3 km	MPC · JPL
167535	2003 YO_{161}	—	December 17, 2003	Socorro	LINEAR	·	5.6 km	MPC · JPL
167536	2003 YE_{169}	—	December 18, 2003	Socorro	LINEAR	·	4.3 km	MPC · JPL
167537	2003 YX_{175}	—	December 21, 2003	Catalina	CSS	·	3.1 km	MPC · JPL
167538	2004 AM_{1}	—	January 12, 2004	Palomar	NEAT	·	5.4 km	MPC · JPL
167539	2004 AJ_{2}	—	January 13, 2004	Anderson Mesa	LONEOS	·	4.5 km	MPC · JPL
167540	2004 AJ_{4}	—	January 15, 2004	Kitt Peak	Spacewatch	·	5.4 km	MPC · JPL
167541	2004 AP_{5}	—	January 13, 2004	Anderson Mesa	LONEOS	·	4.4 km	MPC · JPL
167542	2004 AQ_{6}	—	January 15, 2004	Kitt Peak	Spacewatch	·	4.2 km	MPC · JPL
167543	2004 AV_{10}	—	January 3, 2004	Socorro	LINEAR	·	3.7 km	MPC · JPL
167544	2004 AH_{11}	—	January 12, 2004	Palomar	NEAT	·	4.5 km	MPC · JPL
167545	2004 AR_{12}	—	January 13, 2004	Kitt Peak	Spacewatch	·	3.8 km	MPC · JPL
167546	2004 AG_{13}	—	January 13, 2004	Kitt Peak	Spacewatch	·	3.6 km	MPC · JPL
167547	2004 AG_{16}	—	January 15, 2004	Kitt Peak	Spacewatch	EOS	4.1 km	MPC · JPL
167548	2004 AR_{26}	—	January 13, 2004	Palomar	NEAT	·	5.5 km	MPC · JPL
167549	2004 BR_{1}	—	January 16, 2004	Kitt Peak	Spacewatch	·	5.1 km	MPC · JPL
167550	2004 BK_{3}	—	January 16, 2004	Palomar	NEAT	·	4.0 km	MPC · JPL
167551	2004 BF_{9}	—	January 17, 2004	Palomar	NEAT	·	5.5 km	MPC · JPL
167552	2004 BU_{9}	—	January 16, 2004	Palomar	NEAT	EOS	5.9 km	MPC · JPL
167553	2004 BO_{13}	—	January 17, 2004	Palomar	NEAT	·	2.2 km	MPC · JPL
167554	2004 BJ_{16}	—	January 18, 2004	Palomar	NEAT	·	5.1 km	MPC · JPL
167555	2004 BL_{18}	—	January 17, 2004	Palomar	NEAT	·	6.4 km	MPC · JPL
167556	2004 BZ_{23}	—	January 19, 2004	Anderson Mesa	LONEOS	·	3.2 km	MPC · JPL
167557	2004 BR_{32}	—	January 19, 2004	Kitt Peak	Spacewatch	·	2.7 km	MPC · JPL
167558	2004 BX_{35}	—	January 19, 2004	Kitt Peak	Spacewatch	VER	3.5 km	MPC · JPL
167559	2004 BL_{37}	—	January 19, 2004	Kitt Peak	Spacewatch	EOS	3.1 km	MPC · JPL
167560	2004 BR_{37}	—	January 19, 2004	Kitt Peak	Spacewatch	·	6.7 km	MPC · JPL
167561	2004 BX_{39}	—	January 21, 2004	Socorro	LINEAR	·	3.5 km	MPC · JPL
167562	2004 BY_{40}	—	January 21, 2004	Socorro	LINEAR	·	2.0 km	MPC · JPL
167563	2004 BT_{41}	—	January 19, 2004	Socorro	LINEAR	·	3.4 km	MPC · JPL
167564	2004 BY_{41}	—	January 19, 2004	Catalina	CSS	·	4.6 km	MPC · JPL
167565	2004 BQ_{43}	—	January 22, 2004	Socorro	LINEAR	·	4.3 km	MPC · JPL
167566	2004 BU_{45}	—	January 21, 2004	Socorro	LINEAR	HOF	3.7 km	MPC · JPL
167567	2004 BA_{46}	—	January 21, 2004	Socorro	LINEAR	·	5.0 km	MPC · JPL
167568	2004 BR_{48}	—	January 21, 2004	Socorro	LINEAR	·	3.7 km	MPC · JPL
167569	2004 BG_{51}	—	January 21, 2004	Socorro	LINEAR	·	5.1 km	MPC · JPL
167570	2004 BG_{52}	—	January 21, 2004	Socorro	LINEAR	THM	3.7 km	MPC · JPL
167571	2004 BQ_{52}	—	January 21, 2004	Socorro	LINEAR	·	3.0 km	MPC · JPL
167572	2004 BD_{61}	—	January 21, 2004	Socorro	LINEAR	·	4.3 km	MPC · JPL
167573	2004 BR_{61}	—	January 22, 2004	Socorro	LINEAR	·	4.0 km	MPC · JPL
167574	2004 BW_{61}	—	January 22, 2004	Socorro	LINEAR	·	2.8 km	MPC · JPL
167575	2004 BR_{62}	—	January 22, 2004	Socorro	LINEAR	KOR	1.9 km	MPC · JPL
167576	2004 BQ_{69}	—	January 19, 2004	Anderson Mesa	LONEOS	HYG	5.2 km	MPC · JPL
167577	2004 BK_{71}	—	January 22, 2004	Socorro	LINEAR	·	5.0 km	MPC · JPL
167578	2004 BM_{72}	—	January 23, 2004	Socorro	LINEAR	·	3.9 km	MPC · JPL
167579	2004 BF_{73}	—	January 24, 2004	Socorro	LINEAR	CYB	9.0 km	MPC · JPL
167580	2004 BP_{76}	—	January 25, 2004	Haleakala	NEAT	·	3.7 km	MPC · JPL
167581	2004 BV_{76}	—	January 25, 2004	Haleakala	NEAT	·	3.0 km	MPC · JPL
167582	2004 BG_{82}	—	January 27, 2004	Anderson Mesa	LONEOS	·	4.3 km	MPC · JPL
167583	2004 BY_{89}	—	January 23, 2004	Socorro	LINEAR	·	5.0 km	MPC · JPL
167584	2004 BK_{90}	—	January 24, 2004	Socorro	LINEAR	·	4.2 km	MPC · JPL
167585	2004 BY_{92}	—	January 27, 2004	Anderson Mesa	LONEOS	·	3.0 km	MPC · JPL
167586	2004 BK_{94}	—	January 28, 2004	Socorro	LINEAR	·	5.4 km	MPC · JPL
167587	2004 BF_{95}	—	January 28, 2004	Socorro	LINEAR	·	3.8 km	MPC · JPL
167588	2004 BX_{100}	—	January 28, 2004	Kitt Peak	Spacewatch	KOR	2.3 km	MPC · JPL
167589	2004 BQ_{104}	—	January 23, 2004	Socorro	LINEAR	EOS ·	6.6 km	MPC · JPL
167590	2004 BR_{105}	—	January 26, 2004	Anderson Mesa	LONEOS	·	3.4 km	MPC · JPL
167591	2004 BS_{105}	—	January 26, 2004	Anderson Mesa	LONEOS	·	4.1 km	MPC · JPL
167592	2004 BR_{106}	—	January 26, 2004	Anderson Mesa	LONEOS	·	6.0 km	MPC · JPL
167593	2004 BJ_{107}	—	January 28, 2004	Catalina	CSS	EOS	3.4 km	MPC · JPL
167594	2004 BD_{111}	—	January 29, 2004	Socorro	LINEAR	·	3.4 km	MPC · JPL
167595	2004 BC_{112}	—	January 24, 2004	Socorro	LINEAR	·	3.1 km	MPC · JPL
167596	2004 BL_{116}	—	January 26, 2004	Anderson Mesa	LONEOS	·	3.6 km	MPC · JPL
167597	2004 BT_{116}	—	January 27, 2004	Catalina	CSS	·	8.8 km	MPC · JPL
167598	2004 BD_{117}	—	January 28, 2004	Catalina	CSS	EOS ·	4.9 km	MPC · JPL
167599	2004 BU_{117}	—	January 29, 2004	Socorro	LINEAR	EUN	2.1 km	MPC · JPL
167600	2004 BW_{120}	—	January 31, 2004	Socorro	LINEAR	AEG	5.7 km	MPC · JPL

== 167601–167700 ==
back to top

Designation			Discovery			Properties		Ref
Permanent	Provisional	Named after	Date	Site	Discoverer(s)	Category	Diam.	Ref
167601	2004 BJ_{124}	—	January 18, 2004	Palomar	NEAT	·	5.0 km	MPC · JPL
167602	2004 BW_{137}	—	January 19, 2004	Kitt Peak	Spacewatch	KOR	1.7 km	MPC · JPL
167603	2004 BZ_{138}	—	January 19, 2004	Kitt Peak	Spacewatch	KOR	1.9 km	MPC · JPL
167604	2004 BN_{146}	—	January 22, 2004	Socorro	LINEAR	·	2.9 km	MPC · JPL
167605	2004 BA_{151}	—	January 18, 2004	Palomar	NEAT	·	3.3 km	MPC · JPL
167606	2004 BZ_{151}	—	January 18, 2004	Palomar	NEAT	·	4.7 km	MPC · JPL
167607	2004 BF_{157}	—	January 28, 2004	Kitt Peak	Spacewatch	·	3.9 km	MPC · JPL
167608	2004 CB_{1}	—	February 10, 2004	Socorro	LINEAR	·	4.8 km	MPC · JPL
167609	2004 CD_{1}	—	February 1, 2004	Catalina	CSS	·	6.3 km	MPC · JPL
167610	2004 CS_{1}	—	February 11, 2004	Desert Eagle	W. K. Y. Yeung	·	3.7 km	MPC · JPL
167611	2004 CN_{7}	—	February 10, 2004	Nogales	Tenagra II	·	4.0 km	MPC · JPL
167612	2004 CF_{9}	—	February 11, 2004	Kitt Peak	Spacewatch	·	2.3 km	MPC · JPL
167613	2004 CW_{9}	—	February 11, 2004	Catalina	CSS	·	4.6 km	MPC · JPL
167614	2004 CJ_{12}	—	February 11, 2004	Catalina	CSS	·	5.9 km	MPC · JPL
167615	2004 CK_{13}	—	February 11, 2004	Palomar	NEAT	·	5.9 km	MPC · JPL
167616	2004 CH_{15}	—	February 11, 2004	Kitt Peak	Spacewatch	·	3.1 km	MPC · JPL
167617	2004 CJ_{21}	—	February 11, 2004	Anderson Mesa	LONEOS	·	4.2 km	MPC · JPL
167618	2004 CV_{24}	—	February 12, 2004	Palomar	NEAT	·	5.5 km	MPC · JPL
167619	2004 CW_{34}	—	February 13, 2004	Kitt Peak	Spacewatch	·	3.7 km	MPC · JPL
167620	2004 CM_{35}	—	February 11, 2004	Palomar	NEAT	NAE	5.4 km	MPC · JPL
167621	2004 CU_{35}	—	February 11, 2004	Catalina	CSS	·	6.4 km	MPC · JPL
167622	2004 CA_{44}	—	February 12, 2004	Kitt Peak	Spacewatch	·	3.3 km	MPC · JPL
167623	2004 CQ_{50}	—	February 3, 2004	Haleakala	NEAT	·	3.4 km	MPC · JPL
167624	2004 CP_{51}	—	February 14, 2004	Palomar	NEAT	H	940 m	MPC · JPL
167625	2004 CJ_{57}	—	February 11, 2004	Palomar	NEAT	CYB	8.1 km	MPC · JPL
167626	2004 CX_{60}	—	February 11, 2004	Palomar	NEAT	slow	6.1 km	MPC · JPL
167627	2004 CD_{71}	—	February 12, 2004	Kitt Peak	Spacewatch	·	5.3 km	MPC · JPL
167628	2004 CS_{76}	—	February 11, 2004	Palomar	NEAT	EOS	3.0 km	MPC · JPL
167629	2004 CZ_{76}	—	February 11, 2004	Catalina	CSS	·	4.0 km	MPC · JPL
167630	2004 CC_{79}	—	February 11, 2004	Palomar	NEAT	THM	3.1 km	MPC · JPL
167631	2004 CE_{87}	—	February 11, 2004	Palomar	NEAT	EOS	3.4 km	MPC · JPL
167632	2004 CO_{94}	—	February 12, 2004	Kitt Peak	Spacewatch	EOS	3.1 km	MPC · JPL
167633	2004 CA_{107}	—	February 14, 2004	Palomar	NEAT	·	3.7 km	MPC · JPL
167634	2004 CQ_{111}	—	February 13, 2004	Kitt Peak	Spacewatch	·	4.2 km	MPC · JPL
167635	2004 CM_{113}	—	February 13, 2004	Anderson Mesa	LONEOS	·	4.4 km	MPC · JPL
167636	2004 CX_{113}	—	February 13, 2004	Anderson Mesa	LONEOS	·	4.4 km	MPC · JPL
167637	2004 CD_{114}	—	February 13, 2004	Anderson Mesa	LONEOS	EOS	3.3 km	MPC · JPL
167638	2004 CX_{119}	—	February 12, 2004	Kitt Peak	Spacewatch	KOR	2.3 km	MPC · JPL
167639	2004 CX_{126}	—	February 13, 2004	Kitt Peak	Spacewatch	·	4.2 km	MPC · JPL
167640	2004 DU	—	February 16, 2004	Kitt Peak	Spacewatch	·	4.2 km	MPC · JPL
167641	2004 DH_{4}	—	February 16, 2004	Socorro	LINEAR	·	2.6 km	MPC · JPL
167642	2004 DK_{10}	—	February 18, 2004	Desert Eagle	W. K. Y. Yeung	·	3.5 km	MPC · JPL
167643	2004 DP_{14}	—	February 16, 2004	Kitt Peak	Spacewatch	·	2.1 km	MPC · JPL
167644	2004 DW_{18}	—	February 16, 2004	Socorro	LINEAR	·	3.4 km	MPC · JPL
167645	2004 DU_{29}	—	February 17, 2004	Socorro	LINEAR	·	3.5 km	MPC · JPL
167646	2004 DS_{31}	—	February 17, 2004	Kitt Peak	Spacewatch	·	3.6 km	MPC · JPL
167647	2004 DW_{37}	—	February 19, 2004	Socorro	LINEAR	·	2.7 km	MPC · JPL
167648	2004 DG_{41}	—	February 18, 2004	Haleakala	NEAT	·	6.6 km	MPC · JPL
167649	2004 DK_{43}	—	February 23, 2004	Socorro	LINEAR	·	4.8 km	MPC · JPL
167650	2004 DE_{48}	—	February 19, 2004	Socorro	LINEAR	EOS	4.8 km	MPC · JPL
167651	2004 DG_{49}	—	February 19, 2004	Socorro	LINEAR	·	3.8 km	MPC · JPL
167652	2004 DK_{50}	—	February 23, 2004	Socorro	LINEAR	·	3.5 km	MPC · JPL
167653	2004 DK_{57}	—	February 23, 2004	Socorro	LINEAR	·	3.6 km	MPC · JPL
167654	2004 EU_{3}	—	March 10, 2004	Palomar	NEAT	·	4.4 km	MPC · JPL
167655	2004 ED_{4}	—	March 11, 2004	Palomar	NEAT	TIR	4.8 km	MPC · JPL
167656	2004 EC_{7}	—	March 12, 2004	Palomar	NEAT	LIX	5.8 km	MPC · JPL
167657	2004 EY_{12}	—	March 11, 2004	Palomar	NEAT	EOS	3.7 km	MPC · JPL
167658	2004 EA_{15}	—	March 11, 2004	Palomar	NEAT	EOS	3.4 km	MPC · JPL
167659	2004 EO_{18}	—	March 13, 2004	Palomar	NEAT	·	7.7 km	MPC · JPL
167660	2004 EQ_{18}	—	March 14, 2004	Socorro	LINEAR	slow	5.1 km	MPC · JPL
167661	2004 ED_{21}	—	March 15, 2004	Kitt Peak	Spacewatch	·	4.4 km	MPC · JPL
167662	2004 EG_{36}	—	March 13, 2004	Palomar	NEAT	LUT	5.4 km	MPC · JPL
167663	2004 EO_{40}	—	March 15, 2004	Kitt Peak	Spacewatch	THM	4.5 km	MPC · JPL
167664	2004 EC_{59}	—	March 15, 2004	Catalina	CSS	·	5.0 km	MPC · JPL
167665	2004 EL_{65}	—	March 14, 2004	Socorro	LINEAR	LUT	8.2 km	MPC · JPL
167666	2004 EM_{70}	—	March 15, 2004	Kitt Peak	Spacewatch	·	3.9 km	MPC · JPL
167667	2004 EK_{75}	—	March 14, 2004	Kitt Peak	Spacewatch	THM	2.9 km	MPC · JPL
167668	2004 EQ_{77}	—	March 15, 2004	Socorro	LINEAR	·	4.3 km	MPC · JPL
167669	2004 EU_{84}	—	March 15, 2004	Socorro	LINEAR	(6355)	6.8 km	MPC · JPL
167670	2004 EM_{85}	—	March 15, 2004	Socorro	LINEAR	·	6.6 km	MPC · JPL
167671	2004 FR_{4}	—	March 19, 2004	Siding Spring	SSS	·	890 m	MPC · JPL
167672	2004 FM_{29}	—	March 24, 2004	Bergisch Gladbach	W. Bickel	·	2.5 km	MPC · JPL
167673	2004 FX_{32}	—	March 16, 2004	Socorro	LINEAR	·	6.3 km	MPC · JPL
167674	2004 FO_{33}	—	March 16, 2004	Catalina	CSS	·	7.8 km	MPC · JPL
167675	2004 FJ_{98}	—	March 23, 2004	Socorro	LINEAR	·	5.8 km	MPC · JPL
167676	2004 FJ_{122}	—	March 26, 2004	Socorro	LINEAR	·	7.1 km	MPC · JPL
167677	2004 FA_{144}	—	March 28, 2004	Haleakala	NEAT	·	2.9 km	MPC · JPL
167678	2004 GC_{1}	—	April 9, 2004	Catalina	CSS	T_{j} (2.99)	5.9 km	MPC · JPL
167679	2004 GS_{9}	—	April 10, 2004	Palomar	NEAT	·	3.1 km	MPC · JPL
167680	2004 GY_{30}	—	April 13, 2004	Kitt Peak	Spacewatch	·	4.8 km	MPC · JPL
167681	2004 GS_{32}	—	April 12, 2004	Palomar	NEAT	LIX	4.5 km	MPC · JPL
167682	2004 HC_{4}	—	April 16, 2004	Socorro	LINEAR	·	4.6 km	MPC · JPL
167683	2004 HK_{20}	—	April 22, 2004	Desert Eagle	W. K. Y. Yeung	·	3.9 km	MPC · JPL
167684	2004 HY_{50}	—	April 23, 2004	Siding Spring	SSS	·	4.6 km	MPC · JPL
167685	2004 JQ	—	May 9, 2004	Catalina	CSS	·	6.2 km	MPC · JPL
167686	2004 JX_{23}	—	May 14, 2004	Campo Imperatore	CINEOS	L4	18 km	MPC · JPL
167687	2004 LX	—	June 9, 2004	Anderson Mesa	LONEOS	H	700 m	MPC · JPL
167688	2004 LZ_{10}	—	June 9, 2004	Siding Spring	SSS	·	8.1 km	MPC · JPL
167689	2004 OL	—	July 16, 2004	Socorro	LINEAR	H	1.0 km	MPC · JPL
167690	2004 PT_{65}	—	August 10, 2004	Anderson Mesa	LONEOS	H	880 m	MPC · JPL
167691	2004 QG_{9}	—	August 20, 2004	Siding Spring	SSS	H	990 m	MPC · JPL
167692	2004 QG_{17}	—	August 25, 2004	Socorro	LINEAR	H	820 m	MPC · JPL
167693	2004 QJ_{20}	—	August 25, 2004	Socorro	LINEAR	H	900 m	MPC · JPL
167694	2004 QZ_{20}	—	August 20, 2004	Catalina	CSS	·	1.4 km	MPC · JPL
167695	2004 RH_{137}	—	September 8, 2004	Socorro	LINEAR	H	850 m	MPC · JPL
167696	2004 RF_{194}	—	September 10, 2004	Socorro	LINEAR	·	1.2 km	MPC · JPL
167697	2004 RO_{255}	—	September 6, 2004	Palomar	NEAT	H	760 m	MPC · JPL
167698	2004 SR_{4}	—	September 17, 2004	Socorro	LINEAR	·	1.1 km	MPC · JPL
167699	2004 SV_{49}	—	September 22, 2004	Socorro	LINEAR	·	1.0 km	MPC · JPL
167700	2004 SQ_{57}	—	September 16, 2004	Anderson Mesa	LONEOS	PHO	1.8 km	MPC · JPL

== 167701–167800 ==
back to top

Designation			Discovery			Properties		Ref
Permanent	Provisional	Named after	Date	Site	Discoverer(s)	Category	Diam.	Ref
167701	2004 TM_{13}	—	October 8, 2004	Socorro	LINEAR	·	1.4 km	MPC · JPL
167702	2004 TO_{34}	—	October 4, 2004	Kitt Peak	Spacewatch	·	1.2 km	MPC · JPL
167703	2004 TJ_{38}	—	October 4, 2004	Kitt Peak	Spacewatch	·	1.9 km	MPC · JPL
167704	2004 TE_{86}	—	October 5, 2004	Kitt Peak	Spacewatch	·	2.2 km	MPC · JPL
167705	2004 TF_{132}	—	October 7, 2004	Anderson Mesa	LONEOS	·	1.1 km	MPC · JPL
167706	2004 TS_{135}	—	October 8, 2004	Anderson Mesa	LONEOS	·	1.1 km	MPC · JPL
167707	2004 TE_{148}	—	October 6, 2004	Kitt Peak	Spacewatch	·	1 km	MPC · JPL
167708	2004 TL_{153}	—	October 6, 2004	Kitt Peak	Spacewatch	·	850 m	MPC · JPL
167709	2004 TJ_{160}	—	October 6, 2004	Kitt Peak	Spacewatch	·	910 m	MPC · JPL
167710	2004 TH_{171}	—	October 8, 2004	Socorro	LINEAR	·	980 m	MPC · JPL
167711	2004 TT_{183}	—	October 7, 2004	Kitt Peak	Spacewatch	·	860 m	MPC · JPL
167712	2004 TB_{205}	—	October 7, 2004	Kitt Peak	Spacewatch	·	1.2 km	MPC · JPL
167713	2004 TX_{206}	—	October 7, 2004	Kitt Peak	Spacewatch	·	890 m	MPC · JPL
167714	2004 TF_{208}	—	October 7, 2004	Kitt Peak	Spacewatch	MAS	1.3 km	MPC · JPL
167715	2004 TY_{211}	—	October 8, 2004	Kitt Peak	Spacewatch	·	1.8 km	MPC · JPL
167716	2004 TM_{213}	—	October 8, 2004	Kitt Peak	Spacewatch	·	1.1 km	MPC · JPL
167717	2004 TM_{260}	—	October 9, 2004	Kitt Peak	Spacewatch	·	1.1 km	MPC · JPL
167718	2004 TA_{274}	—	October 9, 2004	Kitt Peak	Spacewatch	·	1.1 km	MPC · JPL
167719	2004 TO_{275}	—	October 9, 2004	Kitt Peak	Spacewatch	·	870 m	MPC · JPL
167720	2004 TT_{323}	—	October 11, 2004	Kitt Peak	Spacewatch	·	1.3 km	MPC · JPL
167721	2004 TY_{344}	—	October 15, 2004	Kitt Peak	Spacewatch	·	1.5 km	MPC · JPL
167722	2004 TR_{351}	—	October 10, 2004	Kitt Peak	Spacewatch	·	810 m	MPC · JPL
167723	2004 VE_{19}	—	November 4, 2004	Kitt Peak	Spacewatch	·	960 m	MPC · JPL
167724	2004 VG_{28}	—	November 7, 2004	Socorro	LINEAR	·	1.1 km	MPC · JPL
167725	2004 VT_{31}	—	November 3, 2004	Kitt Peak	Spacewatch	·	920 m	MPC · JPL
167726	2004 VQ_{44}	—	November 4, 2004	Kitt Peak	Spacewatch	V	1.1 km	MPC · JPL
167727	2004 VH_{79}	—	November 3, 2004	Kitt Peak	Spacewatch	·	860 m	MPC · JPL
167728	2004 VD_{86}	—	November 10, 2004	Kitt Peak	Spacewatch	·	820 m	MPC · JPL
167729	2004 VC_{91}	—	November 3, 2004	Anderson Mesa	LONEOS	(883)	1.1 km	MPC · JPL
167730	2004 WU_{5}	—	November 19, 2004	Kitt Peak	Spacewatch	·	1.0 km	MPC · JPL
167731	2004 XV_{1}	—	December 1, 2004	Catalina	CSS	·	2.2 km	MPC · JPL
167732	2004 XW_{1}	—	December 1, 2004	Catalina	CSS	·	1.5 km	MPC · JPL
167733	2004 XX_{12}	—	December 8, 2004	Socorro	LINEAR	NYS	1.4 km	MPC · JPL
167734	2004 XR_{13}	—	December 8, 2004	Socorro	LINEAR	·	1.2 km	MPC · JPL
167735	2004 XS_{13}	—	December 8, 2004	Socorro	LINEAR	·	2.6 km	MPC · JPL
167736	2004 XB_{22}	—	December 8, 2004	Socorro	LINEAR	·	1.1 km	MPC · JPL
167737	2004 XZ_{23}	—	December 9, 2004	Socorro	LINEAR	(2076)	1.4 km	MPC · JPL
167738	2004 XD_{25}	—	December 9, 2004	Catalina	CSS	·	1.3 km	MPC · JPL
167739	2004 XL_{25}	—	December 9, 2004	Catalina	CSS	·	1.1 km	MPC · JPL
167740	2004 XQ_{25}	—	December 9, 2004	Catalina	CSS	·	1.6 km	MPC · JPL
167741	2004 XY_{29}	—	December 10, 2004	Socorro	LINEAR	·	1.1 km	MPC · JPL
167742	2004 XL_{31}	—	December 9, 2004	Catalina	CSS	ERI	3.4 km	MPC · JPL
167743	2004 XL_{32}	—	December 10, 2004	Socorro	LINEAR	·	1.0 km	MPC · JPL
167744	2004 XM_{34}	—	December 11, 2004	Kitt Peak	Spacewatch	·	4.7 km	MPC · JPL
167745	2004 XU_{34}	—	December 11, 2004	Kitt Peak	Spacewatch	·	2.3 km	MPC · JPL
167746	2004 XQ_{35}	—	December 2, 2004	Kitt Peak	Spacewatch	NYS	1.3 km	MPC · JPL
167747	2004 XF_{36}	—	December 10, 2004	Socorro	LINEAR	·	2.2 km	MPC · JPL
167748 Markkelly	2004 XB_{42}	Markkelly	December 12, 2004	Jarnac	Jarnac	MAS	1.1 km	MPC · JPL
167749	2004 XW_{56}	—	December 10, 2004	Anderson Mesa	LONEOS	·	3.5 km	MPC · JPL
167750	2004 XW_{61}	—	December 10, 2004	Socorro	LINEAR	·	880 m	MPC · JPL
167751	2004 XZ_{67}	—	December 3, 2004	Kitt Peak	Spacewatch	NYS	1.5 km	MPC · JPL
167752	2004 XP_{70}	—	December 11, 2004	Socorro	LINEAR	(5)	1.7 km	MPC · JPL
167753	2004 XG_{75}	—	December 9, 2004	Kitt Peak	Spacewatch	·	1.3 km	MPC · JPL
167754	2004 XL_{75}	—	December 9, 2004	Catalina	CSS	·	2.5 km	MPC · JPL
167755	2004 XN_{75}	—	December 9, 2004	Catalina	CSS	V	1.1 km	MPC · JPL
167756	2004 XM_{85}	—	December 12, 2004	Kitt Peak	Spacewatch	·	1.2 km	MPC · JPL
167757	2004 XW_{99}	—	December 12, 2004	Kitt Peak	Spacewatch	NYS	1.6 km	MPC · JPL
167758	2004 XT_{107}	—	December 11, 2004	Socorro	LINEAR	·	1.6 km	MPC · JPL
167759	2004 XQ_{109}	—	December 13, 2004	Kitt Peak	Spacewatch	·	1.1 km	MPC · JPL
167760	2004 XQ_{131}	—	December 11, 2004	Socorro	LINEAR	·	1.5 km	MPC · JPL
167761	2004 XD_{132}	—	December 11, 2004	Socorro	LINEAR	·	1.4 km	MPC · JPL
167762	2004 XX_{139}	—	December 13, 2004	Kitt Peak	Spacewatch	·	1.8 km	MPC · JPL
167763	2004 XM_{141}	—	December 14, 2004	Socorro	LINEAR	NYS	2.2 km	MPC · JPL
167764	2004 XS_{145}	—	December 14, 2004	Socorro	LINEAR	·	1.0 km	MPC · JPL
167765	2004 XS_{176}	—	December 11, 2004	Socorro	LINEAR	·	1.0 km	MPC · JPL
167766	2004 XS_{186}	—	December 15, 2004	Kitt Peak	Spacewatch	·	1.1 km	MPC · JPL
167767	2004 YF_{19}	—	December 18, 2004	Mount Lemmon	Mount Lemmon Survey	·	1.6 km	MPC · JPL
167768	2004 YL_{21}	—	December 18, 2004	Mount Lemmon	Mount Lemmon Survey	·	920 m	MPC · JPL
167769	2004 YW_{22}	—	December 18, 2004	Mount Lemmon	Mount Lemmon Survey	·	1.9 km	MPC · JPL
167770	2004 YM_{33}	—	December 16, 2004	Anderson Mesa	LONEOS	V	1.2 km	MPC · JPL
167771	2005 AF_{1}	—	January 1, 2005	Catalina	CSS	V	990 m	MPC · JPL
167772	2005 AM_{2}	—	January 6, 2005	Catalina	CSS	·	2.0 km	MPC · JPL
167773	2005 AP_{7}	—	January 6, 2005	Catalina	CSS	·	1.9 km	MPC · JPL
167774	2005 AH_{8}	—	January 6, 2005	Catalina	CSS	·	1.5 km	MPC · JPL
167775	2005 AM_{11}	—	January 1, 2005	Catalina	CSS	·	1.4 km	MPC · JPL
167776	2005 AR_{15}	—	January 6, 2005	Socorro	LINEAR	·	2.2 km	MPC · JPL
167777	2005 AC_{16}	—	January 6, 2005	Socorro	LINEAR	MAR	1.9 km	MPC · JPL
167778	2005 AG_{16}	—	January 6, 2005	Socorro	LINEAR	·	5.4 km	MPC · JPL
167779	2005 AT_{16}	—	January 6, 2005	Socorro	LINEAR	MAS	1.2 km	MPC · JPL
167780	2005 AN_{17}	—	January 6, 2005	Socorro	LINEAR	NYS ·	2.0 km	MPC · JPL
167781	2005 AY_{18}	—	January 7, 2005	Socorro	LINEAR	·	1.8 km	MPC · JPL
167782	2005 AF_{21}	—	January 6, 2005	Catalina	CSS	·	2.8 km	MPC · JPL
167783	2005 AC_{22}	—	January 6, 2005	Socorro	LINEAR	·	1.9 km	MPC · JPL
167784	2005 AE_{31}	—	January 11, 2005	Socorro	LINEAR	·	1.2 km	MPC · JPL
167785	2005 AT_{31}	—	January 11, 2005	Socorro	LINEAR	·	1.3 km	MPC · JPL
167786	2005 AO_{32}	—	January 11, 2005	Socorro	LINEAR	NYS	2.5 km	MPC · JPL
167787	2005 AT_{33}	—	January 13, 2005	Kitt Peak	Spacewatch	AGN	1.9 km	MPC · JPL
167788	2005 AL_{36}	—	January 13, 2005	Socorro	LINEAR	·	1.9 km	MPC · JPL
167789	2005 AC_{39}	—	January 13, 2005	Kitt Peak	Spacewatch	·	2.6 km	MPC · JPL
167790	2005 AU_{39}	—	January 13, 2005	Kitt Peak	Spacewatch	MAS	1.1 km	MPC · JPL
167791	2005 AM_{41}	—	January 15, 2005	Socorro	LINEAR	KOR	2.3 km	MPC · JPL
167792	2005 AK_{43}	—	January 15, 2005	Socorro	LINEAR	MAS	1.2 km	MPC · JPL
167793	2005 AO_{45}	—	January 14, 2005	Bergisch Gladbach	W. Bickel	·	2.6 km	MPC · JPL
167794	2005 AM_{48}	—	January 13, 2005	Kitt Peak	Spacewatch	HOF	4.6 km	MPC · JPL
167795	2005 AU_{53}	—	January 13, 2005	Kitt Peak	Spacewatch	NYS	1.7 km	MPC · JPL
167796	2005 AP_{68}	—	January 13, 2005	Catalina	CSS	·	2.5 km	MPC · JPL
167797	2005 AS_{72}	—	January 15, 2005	Kitt Peak	Spacewatch	·	2.4 km	MPC · JPL
167798	2005 AF_{81}	—	January 15, 2005	Kitt Peak	Spacewatch	·	2.9 km	MPC · JPL
167799	2005 AQ_{81}	—	January 11, 2005	Socorro	LINEAR	·	2.3 km	MPC · JPL
167800	2005 BT_{5}	—	January 16, 2005	Socorro	LINEAR	·	1.9 km	MPC · JPL

== 167801–167900 ==
back to top

Designation			Discovery			Properties		Ref
Permanent	Provisional	Named after	Date	Site	Discoverer(s)	Category	Diam.	Ref
167801	2005 BG_{8}	—	January 16, 2005	Socorro	LINEAR	·	1.7 km	MPC · JPL
167802	2005 BB_{9}	—	January 16, 2005	Socorro	LINEAR	·	2.7 km	MPC · JPL
167803	2005 BH_{10}	—	January 16, 2005	Kitt Peak	Spacewatch	·	1.7 km	MPC · JPL
167804	2005 BC_{11}	—	January 16, 2005	Kitt Peak	Spacewatch	MAS	1.1 km	MPC · JPL
167805	2005 BK_{11}	—	January 16, 2005	Kitt Peak	Spacewatch	MAS	1.3 km	MPC · JPL
167806	2005 BK_{18}	—	January 16, 2005	Socorro	LINEAR	·	1.1 km	MPC · JPL
167807	2005 BD_{19}	—	January 16, 2005	Socorro	LINEAR	·	1.7 km	MPC · JPL
167808	2005 BE_{21}	—	January 16, 2005	Socorro	LINEAR	·	3.3 km	MPC · JPL
167809	2005 BK_{21}	—	January 16, 2005	Socorro	LINEAR	·	1.8 km	MPC · JPL
167810	2005 BN_{21}	—	January 16, 2005	Kitt Peak	Spacewatch	·	2.7 km	MPC · JPL
167811	2005 BX_{25}	—	January 18, 2005	Catalina	CSS	·	2.1 km	MPC · JPL
167812	2005 CG	—	February 1, 2005	Goodricke-Pigott	R. A. Tucker	·	3.7 km	MPC · JPL
167813	2005 CP_{2}	—	February 1, 2005	Catalina	CSS	MAS	1.6 km	MPC · JPL
167814	2005 CF_{5}	—	February 1, 2005	Kitt Peak	Spacewatch	(12739)	2.6 km	MPC · JPL
167815	2005 CQ_{5}	—	February 1, 2005	Palomar	NEAT	(5)	2.0 km	MPC · JPL
167816	2005 CW_{5}	—	February 1, 2005	Kitt Peak	Spacewatch	·	3.4 km	MPC · JPL
167817	2005 CY_{5}	—	February 1, 2005	Kitt Peak	Spacewatch	RAF	1.7 km	MPC · JPL
167818	2005 CH_{8}	—	February 1, 2005	Catalina	CSS	MIS	3.7 km	MPC · JPL
167819	2005 CQ_{8}	—	February 1, 2005	Palomar	NEAT	·	920 m	MPC · JPL
167820	2005 CW_{8}	—	February 1, 2005	Catalina	CSS	·	3.9 km	MPC · JPL
167821	2005 CS_{11}	—	February 1, 2005	Catalina	CSS	MAS	1.0 km	MPC · JPL
167822	2005 CV_{11}	—	February 1, 2005	Catalina	CSS	ERI	3.2 km	MPC · JPL
167823	2005 CK_{16}	—	February 2, 2005	Socorro	LINEAR	·	1.7 km	MPC · JPL
167824	2005 CJ_{17}	—	February 2, 2005	Socorro	LINEAR	·	1.5 km	MPC · JPL
167825	2005 CL_{18}	—	February 2, 2005	Catalina	CSS	EOS	5.6 km	MPC · JPL
167826	2005 CV_{20}	—	February 2, 2005	Catalina	CSS	·	1.3 km	MPC · JPL
167827	2005 CA_{27}	—	February 1, 2005	Kitt Peak	Spacewatch	·	1.5 km	MPC · JPL
167828	2005 CC_{27}	—	February 1, 2005	Palomar	NEAT	·	2.6 km	MPC · JPL
167829	2005 CH_{27}	—	February 2, 2005	Socorro	LINEAR	·	1.7 km	MPC · JPL
167830	2005 CA_{28}	—	February 3, 2005	Palomar	NEAT	·	2.5 km	MPC · JPL
167831	2005 CY_{42}	—	February 2, 2005	Socorro	LINEAR	·	1.6 km	MPC · JPL
167832	2005 CJ_{43}	—	February 2, 2005	Catalina	CSS	·	3.5 km	MPC · JPL
167833	2005 CB_{44}	—	February 2, 2005	Kitt Peak	Spacewatch	HYG	4.6 km	MPC · JPL
167834	2005 CJ_{47}	—	February 2, 2005	Kitt Peak	Spacewatch	GEF	1.9 km	MPC · JPL
167835	2005 CR_{47}	—	February 2, 2005	Kitt Peak	Spacewatch	NYS	1.6 km	MPC · JPL
167836	2005 CT_{47}	—	February 2, 2005	Kitt Peak	Spacewatch	·	3.6 km	MPC · JPL
167837	2005 CJ_{50}	—	February 2, 2005	Socorro	LINEAR	·	2.3 km	MPC · JPL
167838	2005 CY_{51}	—	February 2, 2005	Catalina	CSS	·	1.8 km	MPC · JPL
167839	2005 CN_{59}	—	February 2, 2005	Socorro	LINEAR	·	2.8 km	MPC · JPL
167840	2005 CQ_{60}	—	February 4, 2005	Kitt Peak	Spacewatch	NYS	1.6 km	MPC · JPL
167841	2005 CP_{63}	—	February 9, 2005	Kitt Peak	Spacewatch	AGN	1.9 km	MPC · JPL
167842	2005 CV_{63}	—	February 9, 2005	Anderson Mesa	LONEOS	HYG	4.2 km	MPC · JPL
167843	2005 CT_{64}	—	February 9, 2005	Mount Lemmon	Mount Lemmon Survey	·	2.0 km	MPC · JPL
167844	2005 CC_{68}	—	February 2, 2005	Palomar	NEAT	·	3.5 km	MPC · JPL
167845	2005 CE_{68}	—	February 2, 2005	Catalina	CSS	·	2.1 km	MPC · JPL
167846	2005 CH_{68}	—	February 2, 2005	Catalina	CSS	·	1.7 km	MPC · JPL
167847	2005 CM_{74}	—	February 2, 2005	Palomar	NEAT	·	2.2 km	MPC · JPL
167848	2005 CR_{75}	—	February 2, 2005	Socorro	LINEAR	·	2.3 km	MPC · JPL
167849	2005 CS_{75}	—	February 2, 2005	Socorro	LINEAR	DOR	4.1 km	MPC · JPL
167850	2005 CC_{76}	—	February 2, 2005	Kitt Peak	Spacewatch	(7744)	2.4 km	MPC · JPL
167851	2005 CJ_{76}	—	February 2, 2005	Catalina	CSS	NEM	3.5 km	MPC · JPL
167852 Maturana	2005 DM	Maturana	February 17, 2005	La Silla	A. Boattini, H. Scholl	EOS	3.2 km	MPC · JPL
167853	2005 DN	—	February 26, 2005	Gnosca	S. Sposetti	·	2.4 km	MPC · JPL
167854	2005 ES	—	March 1, 2005	Altschwendt	W. Ries	(16286)	3.6 km	MPC · JPL
167855 Natalinistéphane	2005 ET	Natalinistéphane	March 1, 2005	Vicques	M. Ory	·	4.9 km	MPC · JPL
167856	2005 ED_{9}	—	March 2, 2005	Kitt Peak	Spacewatch	·	2.1 km	MPC · JPL
167857	2005 EE_{10}	—	March 2, 2005	Kitt Peak	Spacewatch	DOR	5.0 km	MPC · JPL
167858	2005 EN_{10}	—	March 2, 2005	Kitt Peak	Spacewatch	·	1.7 km	MPC · JPL
167859	2005 EV_{12}	—	March 2, 2005	Catalina	CSS	·	1.9 km	MPC · JPL
167860	2005 EG_{18}	—	March 3, 2005	Catalina	CSS	fast	1.9 km	MPC · JPL
167861	2005 EV_{19}	—	March 3, 2005	Catalina	CSS	(5)	1.5 km	MPC · JPL
167862	2005 EB_{20}	—	March 3, 2005	Catalina	CSS	·	1.4 km	MPC · JPL
167863	2005 EW_{21}	—	March 3, 2005	Catalina	CSS	·	1.3 km	MPC · JPL
167864	2005 ED_{22}	—	March 3, 2005	Catalina	CSS	·	3.8 km	MPC · JPL
167865	2005 EV_{22}	—	March 3, 2005	Catalina	CSS	·	1.6 km	MPC · JPL
167866	2005 EX_{22}	—	March 3, 2005	Catalina	CSS	·	1.7 km	MPC · JPL
167867	2005 EC_{23}	—	March 3, 2005	Catalina	CSS	·	4.1 km	MPC · JPL
167868	2005 EE_{27}	—	March 3, 2005	Catalina	CSS	·	1.2 km	MPC · JPL
167869	2005 EK_{27}	—	March 3, 2005	Catalina	CSS	·	7.6 km	MPC · JPL
167870	2005 EP_{27}	—	March 3, 2005	Catalina	CSS	·	3.9 km	MPC · JPL
167871	2005 ER_{27}	—	March 3, 2005	Catalina	CSS	MAS	1.2 km	MPC · JPL
167872	2005 ED_{28}	—	March 3, 2005	Catalina	CSS	·	6.9 km	MPC · JPL
167873	2005 EJ_{28}	—	March 3, 2005	Catalina	CSS	EOS	3.1 km	MPC · JPL
167874	2005 ED_{29}	—	March 3, 2005	Catalina	CSS	·	3.2 km	MPC · JPL
167875 Kromminga	2005 EV_{29}	Kromminga	March 2, 2005	Calvin-Rehoboth	Calvin College	·	1.6 km	MPC · JPL
167876	2005 EA_{33}	—	March 3, 2005	Catalina	CSS	KOR	2.3 km	MPC · JPL
167877	2005 EH_{35}	—	March 3, 2005	Kitt Peak	Spacewatch	·	2.0 km	MPC · JPL
167878	2005 EA_{36}	—	March 4, 2005	Catalina	CSS	·	3.2 km	MPC · JPL
167879	2005 EJ_{36}	—	March 4, 2005	Catalina	CSS	MAR	1.7 km	MPC · JPL
167880	2005 EW_{37}	—	March 4, 2005	Kitt Peak	Spacewatch	·	1.5 km	MPC · JPL
167881	2005 ET_{39}	—	March 1, 2005	Kitt Peak	Spacewatch	·	1.8 km	MPC · JPL
167882	2005 EG_{44}	—	March 3, 2005	Kitt Peak	Spacewatch	·	1.4 km	MPC · JPL
167883	2005 EQ_{45}	—	March 3, 2005	Kitt Peak	Spacewatch	·	4.8 km	MPC · JPL
167884	2005 ES_{45}	—	March 3, 2005	Kitt Peak	Spacewatch	·	1.3 km	MPC · JPL
167885	2005 EA_{47}	—	March 3, 2005	Kitt Peak	Spacewatch	PAD	3.8 km	MPC · JPL
167886	2005 EK_{48}	—	March 3, 2005	Catalina	CSS	·	1.6 km	MPC · JPL
167887	2005 EP_{49}	—	March 3, 2005	Catalina	CSS	·	3.1 km	MPC · JPL
167888	2005 EQ_{61}	—	March 4, 2005	Socorro	LINEAR	·	3.7 km	MPC · JPL
167889	2005 EY_{64}	—	March 4, 2005	Socorro	LINEAR	·	5.1 km	MPC · JPL
167890	2005 EO_{67}	—	March 4, 2005	Socorro	LINEAR	·	3.0 km	MPC · JPL
167891	2005 ET_{68}	—	March 7, 2005	Socorro	LINEAR	·	4.7 km	MPC · JPL
167892	2005 ED_{69}	—	March 7, 2005	Socorro	LINEAR	THM	5.5 km	MPC · JPL
167893	2005 EK_{69}	—	March 7, 2005	Socorro	LINEAR	·	7.1 km	MPC · JPL
167894	2005 EU_{70}	—	March 4, 2005	Socorro	LINEAR	PHO	1.8 km	MPC · JPL
167895	2005 EB_{73}	—	March 2, 2005	Catalina	CSS	AGN	2.7 km	MPC · JPL
167896	2005 EO_{76}	—	March 3, 2005	Kitt Peak	Spacewatch	·	2.6 km	MPC · JPL
167897	2005 EM_{77}	—	March 3, 2005	Catalina	CSS	·	3.0 km	MPC · JPL
167898	2005 EP_{78}	—	March 3, 2005	Catalina	CSS	·	5.1 km	MPC · JPL
167899	2005 ED_{79}	—	March 3, 2005	Catalina	CSS	·	4.6 km	MPC · JPL
167900	2005 EO_{80}	—	March 4, 2005	Kitt Peak	Spacewatch	·	1.9 km	MPC · JPL

== 167901–168000 ==
back to top

Designation			Discovery			Properties		Ref
Permanent	Provisional	Named after	Date	Site	Discoverer(s)	Category	Diam.	Ref
167901	2005 EZ_{83}	—	March 4, 2005	Catalina	CSS	·	4.6 km	MPC · JPL
167902	2005 ET_{89}	—	March 8, 2005	Socorro	LINEAR	·	2.6 km	MPC · JPL
167903	2005 EU_{89}	—	March 8, 2005	Anderson Mesa	LONEOS	·	1.7 km	MPC · JPL
167904	2005 EP_{91}	—	March 8, 2005	Kitt Peak	Spacewatch	JUN	1.9 km	MPC · JPL
167905	2005 EZ_{95}	—	March 3, 2005	Catalina	CSS	·	1.9 km	MPC · JPL
167906	2005 EG_{96}	—	March 3, 2005	Catalina	CSS	·	3.6 km	MPC · JPL
167907	2005 EB_{97}	—	March 3, 2005	Catalina	CSS	·	3.5 km	MPC · JPL
167908	2005 EJ_{97}	—	March 3, 2005	Catalina	CSS	·	1.7 km	MPC · JPL
167909	2005 EP_{98}	—	March 3, 2005	Catalina	CSS	·	3.0 km	MPC · JPL
167910	2005 EU_{99}	—	March 3, 2005	Catalina	CSS	·	2.7 km	MPC · JPL
167911	2005 ES_{100}	—	March 3, 2005	Catalina	CSS	·	3.6 km	MPC · JPL
167912	2005 ED_{101}	—	March 3, 2005	Catalina	CSS	·	2.5 km	MPC · JPL
167913	2005 EH_{102}	—	March 3, 2005	Catalina	CSS	·	4.3 km	MPC · JPL
167914	2005 EO_{102}	—	March 3, 2005	Kitt Peak	Spacewatch	·	3.7 km	MPC · JPL
167915	2005 EG_{108}	—	March 4, 2005	Catalina	CSS	·	2.8 km	MPC · JPL
167916	2005 ER_{108}	—	March 4, 2005	Catalina	CSS	EOS	3.2 km	MPC · JPL
167917	2005 EB_{111}	—	March 4, 2005	Mount Lemmon	Mount Lemmon Survey	·	3.2 km	MPC · JPL
167918	2005 EF_{112}	—	March 4, 2005	Socorro	LINEAR	·	3.3 km	MPC · JPL
167919	2005 EB_{118}	—	March 7, 2005	Socorro	LINEAR	EUN	1.9 km	MPC · JPL
167920	2005 ED_{118}	—	March 7, 2005	Socorro	LINEAR	EUN	1.8 km	MPC · JPL
167921	2005 ET_{118}	—	March 7, 2005	Socorro	LINEAR	EUN	2.0 km	MPC · JPL
167922	2005 EE_{120}	—	March 8, 2005	Kitt Peak	Spacewatch	EOS	3.6 km	MPC · JPL
167923	2005 EO_{128}	—	March 9, 2005	Kitt Peak	Spacewatch	·	3.1 km	MPC · JPL
167924	2005 EN_{131}	—	March 9, 2005	Mount Lemmon	Mount Lemmon Survey	·	2.4 km	MPC · JPL
167925	2005 ED_{134}	—	March 9, 2005	Mount Lemmon	Mount Lemmon Survey	·	1.5 km	MPC · JPL
167926	2005 EB_{142}	—	March 10, 2005	Catalina	CSS	·	3.4 km	MPC · JPL
167927	2005 EG_{143}	—	March 10, 2005	Catalina	CSS	·	2.3 km	MPC · JPL
167928	2005 EJ_{157}	—	March 9, 2005	Mount Lemmon	Mount Lemmon Survey	·	4.1 km	MPC · JPL
167929	2005 EF_{160}	—	March 9, 2005	Mount Lemmon	Mount Lemmon Survey	·	4.4 km	MPC · JPL
167930	2005 ET_{160}	—	March 9, 2005	Mount Lemmon	Mount Lemmon Survey	EOS	3.3 km	MPC · JPL
167931	2005 ER_{168}	—	March 11, 2005	Mount Lemmon	Mount Lemmon Survey	·	5.5 km	MPC · JPL
167932	2005 EH_{171}	—	March 7, 2005	Socorro	LINEAR	HNS	1.8 km	MPC · JPL
167933	2005 EF_{172}	—	March 7, 2005	Socorro	LINEAR	·	3.7 km	MPC · JPL
167934	2005 EK_{173}	—	March 8, 2005	Anderson Mesa	LONEOS	·	2.2 km	MPC · JPL
167935	2005 EJ_{174}	—	March 8, 2005	Kitt Peak	Spacewatch	EOS	2.5 km	MPC · JPL
167936	2005 EX_{176}	—	March 8, 2005	Mount Lemmon	Mount Lemmon Survey	VER	4.8 km	MPC · JPL
167937	2005 EA_{177}	—	March 8, 2005	Mount Lemmon	Mount Lemmon Survey	·	5.0 km	MPC · JPL
167938	2005 EQ_{177}	—	March 8, 2005	Mount Lemmon	Mount Lemmon Survey	·	1.8 km	MPC · JPL
167939	2005 EV_{178}	—	March 9, 2005	Anderson Mesa	LONEOS	·	4.7 km	MPC · JPL
167940	2005 EJ_{184}	—	March 9, 2005	Mount Lemmon	Mount Lemmon Survey	GEF	2.0 km	MPC · JPL
167941	2005 EP_{185}	—	March 10, 2005	Catalina	CSS	·	1.9 km	MPC · JPL
167942	2005 EQ_{185}	—	March 10, 2005	Catalina	CSS	·	3.3 km	MPC · JPL
167943	2005 EZ_{186}	—	March 10, 2005	Anderson Mesa	LONEOS	·	7.2 km	MPC · JPL
167944	2005 EY_{189}	—	March 11, 2005	Mount Lemmon	Mount Lemmon Survey	AGN	1.7 km	MPC · JPL
167945	2005 EC_{194}	—	March 11, 2005	Mount Lemmon	Mount Lemmon Survey	(5)	3.2 km	MPC · JPL
167946	2005 EC_{202}	—	March 8, 2005	Socorro	LINEAR	·	2.9 km	MPC · JPL
167947	2005 EC_{206}	—	March 13, 2005	Catalina	CSS	GEF	2.0 km	MPC · JPL
167948	2005 ER_{210}	—	March 4, 2005	Kitt Peak	Spacewatch	EOS	3.0 km	MPC · JPL
167949	2005 EX_{212}	—	March 4, 2005	Mount Lemmon	Mount Lemmon Survey	·	2.3 km	MPC · JPL
167950	2005 EX_{218}	—	March 10, 2005	Anderson Mesa	LONEOS	·	2.6 km	MPC · JPL
167951	2005 EK_{219}	—	March 10, 2005	Mount Lemmon	Mount Lemmon Survey	AEG	6.5 km	MPC · JPL
167952	2005 EY_{219}	—	March 10, 2005	Siding Spring	SSS	EUN	2.1 km	MPC · JPL
167953	2005 EC_{223}	—	March 10, 2005	Catalina	CSS	·	6.0 km	MPC · JPL
167954	2005 EX_{223}	—	March 14, 2005	Mount Lemmon	Mount Lemmon Survey	·	4.4 km	MPC · JPL
167955	2005 EZ_{240}	—	March 11, 2005	Catalina	CSS	·	3.2 km	MPC · JPL
167956	2005 EV_{242}	—	March 11, 2005	Catalina	CSS	NAE	5.5 km	MPC · JPL
167957	2005 EC_{245}	—	March 11, 2005	Kitt Peak	Spacewatch	EOS ·	6.0 km	MPC · JPL
167958	2005 EX_{248}	—	March 12, 2005	Mount Lemmon	Mount Lemmon Survey	PAD	4.8 km	MPC · JPL
167959	2005 EK_{249}	—	March 13, 2005	Kitt Peak	Spacewatch	·	1.6 km	MPC · JPL
167960 Rudzikas	2005 EV_{249}	Rudzikas	March 13, 2005	Moletai	K. Černis, Zdanavicius, J.	TEL	2.6 km	MPC · JPL
167961	2005 EM_{257}	—	March 11, 2005	Mount Lemmon	Mount Lemmon Survey	AGN	1.8 km	MPC · JPL
167962	2005 EQ_{267}	—	March 13, 2005	Kitt Peak	Spacewatch	·	3.8 km	MPC · JPL
167963	2005 EM_{268}	—	March 14, 2005	Mount Lemmon	Mount Lemmon Survey	·	2.1 km	MPC · JPL
167964	2005 EU_{275}	—	March 8, 2005	Anderson Mesa	LONEOS	·	5.8 km	MPC · JPL
167965	2005 EZ_{275}	—	March 8, 2005	Anderson Mesa	LONEOS	·	2.6 km	MPC · JPL
167966	2005 EE_{277}	—	March 9, 2005	Anderson Mesa	LONEOS	·	3.6 km	MPC · JPL
167967	2005 EX_{277}	—	March 9, 2005	Socorro	LINEAR	EOS	2.6 km	MPC · JPL
167968	2005 EV_{278}	—	March 9, 2005	Mount Lemmon	Mount Lemmon Survey	·	4.2 km	MPC · JPL
167969	2005 ED_{287}	—	March 13, 2005	Mount Lemmon	Mount Lemmon Survey	·	2.7 km	MPC · JPL
167970	2005 EL_{291}	—	March 10, 2005	Catalina	CSS	·	4.0 km	MPC · JPL
167971 Carlyhowett	2005 EF_{303}	Carlyhowett	March 11, 2005	Kitt Peak	M. W. Buie	·	4.4 km	MPC · JPL
167972	2005 FB_{1}	—	March 16, 2005	Catalina	CSS	EOS	3.4 km	MPC · JPL
167973	2005 FB_{4}	—	March 18, 2005	Socorro	LINEAR	EOS	3.7 km	MPC · JPL
167974	2005 FN_{10}	—	March 17, 2005	Catalina	CSS	·	1.6 km	MPC · JPL
167975	2005 GY_{6}	—	April 1, 2005	Kitt Peak	Spacewatch	·	2.1 km	MPC · JPL
167976 Ormsbymitchel	2005 GS_{8}	Ormsbymitchel	April 1, 2005	Goodricke-Pigott	Reddy, V.	·	6.0 km	MPC · JPL
167977	2005 GC_{10}	—	April 1, 2005	Anderson Mesa	LONEOS	·	3.0 km	MPC · JPL
167978	2005 GE_{10}	—	April 4, 2005	Desert Eagle	W. K. Y. Yeung	·	4.5 km	MPC · JPL
167979	2005 GH_{16}	—	April 2, 2005	Mount Lemmon	Mount Lemmon Survey	·	1.8 km	MPC · JPL
167980	2005 GL_{16}	—	April 2, 2005	Mount Lemmon	Mount Lemmon Survey	·	2.4 km	MPC · JPL
167981	2005 GU_{22}	—	April 1, 2005	Kitt Peak	Spacewatch	·	5.3 km	MPC · JPL
167982	2005 GO_{29}	—	April 4, 2005	Catalina	CSS	·	4.6 km	MPC · JPL
167983	2005 GT_{32}	—	April 4, 2005	Socorro	LINEAR	THM	4.6 km	MPC · JPL
167984	2005 GT_{37}	—	April 2, 2005	Siding Spring	SSS	RAF	1.8 km	MPC · JPL
167985	2005 GK_{50}	—	April 5, 2005	Kitt Peak	Spacewatch	·	3.1 km	MPC · JPL
167986	2005 GX_{66}	—	April 2, 2005	Mount Lemmon	Mount Lemmon Survey	·	3.0 km	MPC · JPL
167987	2005 GQ_{69}	—	April 3, 2005	Palomar	NEAT	EUN	1.9 km	MPC · JPL
167988	2005 GQ_{76}	—	April 5, 2005	Mount Lemmon	Mount Lemmon Survey	·	4.5 km	MPC · JPL
167989	2005 GZ_{85}	—	April 4, 2005	Catalina	CSS	AGN	1.8 km	MPC · JPL
167990	2005 GW_{89}	—	April 5, 2005	Kitt Peak	Spacewatch	·	2.5 km	MPC · JPL
167991	2005 GJ_{95}	—	April 6, 2005	Kitt Peak	Spacewatch	·	3.7 km	MPC · JPL
167992	2005 GL_{95}	—	April 6, 2005	Kitt Peak	Spacewatch	THM	3.3 km	MPC · JPL
167993	2005 GS_{103}	—	April 9, 2005	Mount Lemmon	Mount Lemmon Survey	·	2.6 km	MPC · JPL
167994	2005 GW_{109}	—	April 10, 2005	Mount Lemmon	Mount Lemmon Survey	EUN	2.3 km	MPC · JPL
167995	2005 GO_{116}	—	April 11, 2005	Kitt Peak	Spacewatch	·	2.5 km	MPC · JPL
167996	2005 GD_{120}	—	April 12, 2005	RAS	Lowe, A.	·	3.3 km	MPC · JPL
167997	2005 GV_{125}	—	April 10, 2005	Mount Lemmon	Mount Lemmon Survey	·	3.2 km	MPC · JPL
167998	2005 GC_{126}	—	April 11, 2005	Kitt Peak	Spacewatch	EOS	3.1 km	MPC · JPL
167999	2005 GD_{129}	—	April 7, 2005	Socorro	LINEAR	EOS	4.7 km	MPC · JPL
168000	2005 GY_{131}	—	April 10, 2005	Kitt Peak	Spacewatch	·	2.1 km	MPC · JPL

back to top

== See also ==
- Meanings of minor-planet names: 167001–168000
