= Meanings of minor-planet names: 169001–170000 =

As minor planet discoveries are confirmed, they are given a permanent number by the IAU's Minor Planet Center (MPC), and the discoverers can then submit names for them, following the IAU's naming conventions. The list below concerns those minor planets in the specified number-range that have received names, and explains the meanings of those names.

Official naming citations of newly named small Solar System bodies are approved and published in a bulletin by IAU's Working Group for Small Bodies Nomenclature (WGSBN). Before May 2021, citations were published in MPC's Minor Planet Circulars for many decades. Recent citations can also be found on the JPL Small-Body Database (SBDB). Until his death in 2016, German astronomer Lutz D. Schmadel compiled these citations into the Dictionary of Minor Planet Names (DMP) and regularly updated the collection.

Based on Paul Herget's The Names of the Minor Planets, Schmadel also researched the unclear origin of numerous asteroids, most of which had been named prior to World War II. This article incorporates text from this source, which is in the public domain: SBDB New namings may only be added to this list below after official publication as the preannouncement of names is condemned. The WGSBN publishes a comprehensive guideline for the naming rules of non-cometary small Solar System bodies.

== 169001–169100 ==
Named minor planet	Provisional	This minor planet was named for...	Ref · Catalog
169078 Chuckshaw	2001 HD_{14}	Charles Shaw (born 1946), the mission director for the Hubble Space Telescope rescue mission STS-125.	JPL · 169078

== 169101–169200 ==
back to top

Named minor planet	Provisional	This minor planet was named for...	Ref · Catalog
169184 Jameslee	2001 QQ_{306}	James E. Lee (born 1958), NASA Marshall Spaceflight Center, served as the NASA Program Manager for the New Horizons mission to Pluto.	JPL · 169184

== 169201–169300 ==
back to top

Named minor planet	Provisional	This minor planet was named for...	Ref · Catalog
169299 Sirko	2001 SK_{353}	Edwin Sirko (born 1978) is a former American astronomer with the Sloan Digital Sky Survey, known for his work on cosmological simulations. He was lead programmer on NASA's official computer game, Moonbase Alpha.	JPL · 169299

== 169301–169400 ==
back to top

Named minor planet	Provisional	This minor planet was named for...	Ref · Catalog
There are no named minor planets in this number range

== 169401–169500 ==
back to top

Named minor planet	Provisional	This minor planet was named for...	Ref · Catalog
There are no named minor planets in this number range

== 169501–169600 ==
back to top

Named minor planet	Provisional	This minor planet was named for...	Ref · Catalog
169509 Jeffreyrobbins	2002 CV_{269}	Jeffrey Robbins (1950–2022), American scientist and father of cardiac transgenesis.	JPL · 169509
169568 Baranauskas	2002 FN_{6}	Antanas Baranauskas (1835–1902), a Roman Catholic bishop, mathematician and poet who wrote one of the greatest works in Lithuanian literature, Anyksciu silelis (The Forest of Anyksciai).	JPL · 169568

== 169601–169700 ==
back to top

Named minor planet	Provisional	This minor planet was named for...	Ref · Catalog
There are no named minor planets in this number range

== 169701–169800 ==
back to top

Named minor planet	Provisional	This minor planet was named for...	Ref · Catalog
There are no named minor planets in this number range

== 169801–169900 ==
back to top

Named minor planet	Provisional	This minor planet was named for...	Ref · Catalog
169834 Hujie	2002 QX_{95}	Hu Jie (born 1981), wife of Chinese astronomer Tao Chen, who discovered this minor planet	JPL · 169834

== 169901–170000 ==
back to top

Named minor planet	Provisional	This minor planet was named for...	Ref · Catalog
There are no named minor planets in this number range

back to top

Preceded by 168,001–169,000	Meanings of minor-planet names List of minor planets: 169,001–170,000	Succeeded by 170,001–171,000
