= List of minor planets: 169001–170000 =

The following is a partial list of minor planets, running from minor-planet number 169001 through 170000, inclusive. The primary data for this and other partial lists is based on JPL's "Small-Body Orbital Elements" and data available from the Minor Planet Center. Critical list information is also provided by the MPC, unless otherwise specified from Lowell Observatory. A detailed description of the table's columns and additional sources are given on the main page including a complete list of every page in this series, and a statistical break-up on the dynamical classification of minor planets.

Also see the summary list of all named bodies in numerical and alphabetical order, and the corresponding naming citations for the number range of this particular list. New namings may only be added to this list after official publication, as the preannouncement of names is condemned by the Working Group for Small Bodies Nomenclature of the International Astronomical Union.

Near-Earth obj.	MBA (inner)	MBA (outer)	Centaur
Mars-crosser	MBA (middle)	Jupiter trojan	Trans-Neptunian obj.
Unclassified

== 169001–169100 ==
Designation			Discovery			Properties		Ref
Permanent	Provisional	Named after	Date	Site	Discoverer(s)	Category	Diam.	Ref
169001	2001 DN_{31}	—	February 17, 2001	Socorro	LINEAR	NYS	2.3 km	MPC · JPL
169002	2001 DG_{32}	—	February 17, 2001	Socorro	LINEAR	·	2.6 km	MPC · JPL
169003	2001 DG_{33}	—	February 17, 2001	Socorro	LINEAR	·	1.9 km	MPC · JPL
169004	2001 DO_{36}	—	February 19, 2001	Socorro	LINEAR	·	2.3 km	MPC · JPL
169005	2001 DC_{37}	—	February 19, 2001	Socorro	LINEAR	·	2.0 km	MPC · JPL
169006	2001 DU_{37}	—	February 19, 2001	Socorro	LINEAR	NYS	1.7 km	MPC · JPL
169007	2001 DC_{38}	—	February 19, 2001	Socorro	LINEAR	·	2.3 km	MPC · JPL
169008	2001 DR_{40}	—	February 19, 2001	Socorro	LINEAR	·	3.7 km	MPC · JPL
169009	2001 DD_{42}	—	February 19, 2001	Socorro	LINEAR	·	1.7 km	MPC · JPL
169010	2001 DT_{42}	—	February 19, 2001	Socorro	LINEAR	·	1.8 km	MPC · JPL
169011	2001 DW_{43}	—	February 19, 2001	Socorro	LINEAR	NYS	1.4 km	MPC · JPL
169012	2001 DD_{45}	—	February 19, 2001	Socorro	LINEAR	·	2.4 km	MPC · JPL
169013	2001 DP_{53}	—	February 20, 2001	Socorro	LINEAR	·	1.4 km	MPC · JPL
169014	2001 DM_{60}	—	February 19, 2001	Socorro	LINEAR	NYS	1.7 km	MPC · JPL
169015	2001 DS_{61}	—	February 19, 2001	Socorro	LINEAR	·	2.4 km	MPC · JPL
169016	2001 DD_{66}	—	February 19, 2001	Socorro	LINEAR	·	2.0 km	MPC · JPL
169017	2001 DU_{67}	—	February 19, 2001	Socorro	LINEAR	NYS	1.9 km	MPC · JPL
169018	2001 DV_{68}	—	February 19, 2001	Socorro	LINEAR	NYS	1.7 km	MPC · JPL
169019	2001 DL_{75}	—	February 20, 2001	Socorro	LINEAR	·	1.4 km	MPC · JPL
169020	2001 DD_{89}	—	February 27, 2001	Kitt Peak	Spacewatch	·	1.8 km	MPC · JPL
169021	2001 DP_{90}	—	February 22, 2001	Socorro	LINEAR	·	2.3 km	MPC · JPL
169022	2001 DP_{91}	—	February 20, 2001	Kitt Peak	Spacewatch	·	4.4 km	MPC · JPL
169023	2001 DX_{93}	—	February 19, 2001	Socorro	LINEAR	·	1.3 km	MPC · JPL
169024	2001 DX_{95}	—	February 17, 2001	Socorro	LINEAR	·	1.2 km	MPC · JPL
169025	2001 DY_{95}	—	February 17, 2001	Socorro	LINEAR	·	1.5 km	MPC · JPL
169026	2001 DY_{104}	—	February 16, 2001	Anderson Mesa	LONEOS	MAS	1.2 km	MPC · JPL
169027	2001 DD_{107}	—	February 20, 2001	Kitt Peak	Spacewatch	·	1.5 km	MPC · JPL
169028	2001 EU_{3}	—	March 2, 2001	Anderson Mesa	LONEOS	NYS	1.9 km	MPC · JPL
169029	2001 ES_{7}	—	March 2, 2001	Anderson Mesa	LONEOS	·	2.1 km	MPC · JPL
169030	2001 EA_{9}	—	March 2, 2001	Anderson Mesa	LONEOS	·	2.8 km	MPC · JPL
169031	2001 EZ_{13}	—	March 15, 2001	Socorro	LINEAR	·	2.5 km	MPC · JPL
169032	2001 FR_{10}	—	March 19, 2001	Anderson Mesa	LONEOS	MAS	1.1 km	MPC · JPL
169033	2001 FA_{14}	—	March 19, 2001	Anderson Mesa	LONEOS	·	2.3 km	MPC · JPL
169034	2001 FM_{16}	—	March 19, 2001	Anderson Mesa	LONEOS	·	2.4 km	MPC · JPL
169035	2001 FJ_{19}	—	March 19, 2001	Anderson Mesa	LONEOS	(5)	1.9 km	MPC · JPL
169036	2001 FC_{22}	—	March 21, 2001	Anderson Mesa	LONEOS	·	2.3 km	MPC · JPL
169037	2001 FN_{26}	—	March 18, 2001	Socorro	LINEAR	ERI	3.4 km	MPC · JPL
169038	2001 FD_{40}	—	March 18, 2001	Socorro	LINEAR	·	3.4 km	MPC · JPL
169039	2001 FO_{40}	—	March 18, 2001	Socorro	LINEAR	NYS	1.9 km	MPC · JPL
169040	2001 FS_{42}	—	March 18, 2001	Socorro	LINEAR	·	2.1 km	MPC · JPL
169041	2001 FE_{43}	—	March 18, 2001	Socorro	LINEAR	·	2.0 km	MPC · JPL
169042	2001 FS_{43}	—	March 18, 2001	Socorro	LINEAR	·	2.2 km	MPC · JPL
169043	2001 FV_{48}	—	March 18, 2001	Socorro	LINEAR	·	3.8 km	MPC · JPL
169044	2001 FB_{49}	—	March 18, 2001	Socorro	LINEAR	·	1.9 km	MPC · JPL
169045	2001 FE_{54}	—	March 18, 2001	Socorro	LINEAR	BAR	2.9 km	MPC · JPL
169046	2001 FU_{55}	—	March 23, 2001	Socorro	LINEAR	·	1.7 km	MPC · JPL
169047	2001 FK_{59}	—	March 19, 2001	Socorro	LINEAR	NYS	2.2 km	MPC · JPL
169048	2001 FP_{61}	—	March 19, 2001	Socorro	LINEAR	·	1.8 km	MPC · JPL
169049	2001 FU_{86}	—	March 21, 2001	Anderson Mesa	LONEOS	·	1.7 km	MPC · JPL
169050	2001 FL_{88}	—	March 26, 2001	Kitt Peak	Spacewatch	·	2.0 km	MPC · JPL
169051	2001 FF_{92}	—	March 16, 2001	Socorro	LINEAR	·	4.8 km	MPC · JPL
169052	2001 FH_{92}	—	March 16, 2001	Socorro	LINEAR	·	2.0 km	MPC · JPL
169053	2001 FO_{92}	—	March 16, 2001	Socorro	LINEAR	·	2.5 km	MPC · JPL
169054	2001 FF_{98}	—	March 16, 2001	Kitt Peak	Spacewatch	·	4.2 km	MPC · JPL
169055	2001 FE_{105}	—	March 18, 2001	Socorro	LINEAR	NYS	1.8 km	MPC · JPL
169056	2001 FW_{115}	—	March 19, 2001	Anderson Mesa	LONEOS	·	4.0 km	MPC · JPL
169057	2001 FN_{116}	—	March 19, 2001	Socorro	LINEAR	·	2.5 km	MPC · JPL
169058	2001 FC_{117}	—	March 19, 2001	Socorro	LINEAR	·	2.9 km	MPC · JPL
169059	2001 FV_{124}	—	March 29, 2001	Anderson Mesa	LONEOS	·	1.8 km	MPC · JPL
169060	2001 FY_{124}	—	March 29, 2001	Anderson Mesa	LONEOS	·	1.6 km	MPC · JPL
169061	2001 FP_{126}	—	March 26, 2001	Socorro	LINEAR	·	2.0 km	MPC · JPL
169062	2001 FN_{137}	—	March 21, 2001	Anderson Mesa	LONEOS	·	2.5 km	MPC · JPL
169063	2001 FO_{144}	—	March 23, 2001	Anderson Mesa	LONEOS	·	2.7 km	MPC · JPL
169064	2001 FM_{146}	—	March 24, 2001	Anderson Mesa	LONEOS	·	2.3 km	MPC · JPL
169065	2001 FO_{156}	—	March 26, 2001	Haleakala	NEAT	·	2.0 km	MPC · JPL
169066	2001 FR_{157}	—	March 27, 2001	Anderson Mesa	LONEOS	ERI	4.9 km	MPC · JPL
169067	2001 FK_{167}	—	March 19, 2001	Socorro	LINEAR	H	860 m	MPC · JPL
169068	2001 FX_{167}	—	March 20, 2001	Kitt Peak	Spacewatch	·	1.7 km	MPC · JPL
169069	2001 FC_{171}	—	March 24, 2001	Haleakala	NEAT	·	2.8 km	MPC · JPL
169070	2001 FM_{176}	—	March 16, 2001	Socorro	LINEAR	·	2.2 km	MPC · JPL
169071	2001 FR_{185}	—	March 26, 2001	Kitt Peak	M. W. Buie	plutino	123 km	MPC · JPL
169072	2001 FN_{196}	—	March 26, 2001	Haleakala	NEAT	·	4.9 km	MPC · JPL
169073	2001 GZ_{3}	—	April 15, 2001	Kanab	Sheridan, E. E.	·	4.3 km	MPC · JPL
169074	2001 GK_{7}	—	April 15, 2001	Socorro	LINEAR	·	2.7 km	MPC · JPL
169075	2001 GX_{10}	—	April 15, 2001	Haleakala	NEAT	·	2.3 km	MPC · JPL
169076	2001 GY_{10}	—	April 15, 2001	Haleakala	NEAT	·	3.0 km	MPC · JPL
169077	2001 HT_{3}	—	April 18, 2001	Eskridge	G. Hug	EUN	2.0 km	MPC · JPL
169078 Chuckshaw	2001 HD_{14}	Chuckshaw	April 23, 2001	Kanab	Sheridan, E.	·	2.3 km	MPC · JPL
169079	2001 HO_{14}	—	April 21, 2001	Kitt Peak	Spacewatch	·	3.7 km	MPC · JPL
169080	2001 HT_{32}	—	April 23, 2001	Socorro	LINEAR	·	2.8 km	MPC · JPL
169081	2001 HZ_{33}	—	April 27, 2001	Socorro	LINEAR	·	4.4 km	MPC · JPL
169082	2001 HK_{35}	—	April 29, 2001	Socorro	LINEAR	·	2.2 km	MPC · JPL
169083	2001 HA_{40}	—	April 29, 2001	Kitt Peak	Spacewatch	EUN	1.8 km	MPC · JPL
169084	2001 HF_{49}	—	April 21, 2001	Socorro	LINEAR	·	4.0 km	MPC · JPL
169085	2001 HH_{50}	—	April 22, 2001	Socorro	LINEAR	·	3.2 km	MPC · JPL
169086	2001 HW_{54}	—	April 24, 2001	Kitt Peak	Spacewatch	·	4.1 km	MPC · JPL
169087	2001 HL_{59}	—	April 23, 2001	Socorro	LINEAR	·	1.9 km	MPC · JPL
169088	2001 JG_{3}	—	May 15, 2001	Anderson Mesa	LONEOS	EUN	2.9 km	MPC · JPL
169089	2001 JC_{7}	—	May 15, 2001	Anderson Mesa	LONEOS	·	2.5 km	MPC · JPL
169090	2001 JT_{7}	—	May 15, 2001	Anderson Mesa	LONEOS	·	2.7 km	MPC · JPL
169091	2001 KA_{14}	—	May 18, 2001	Socorro	LINEAR	fast	5.2 km	MPC · JPL
169092	2001 KN_{21}	—	May 22, 2001	OCA-Anza	White, M., M. Collins	·	4.0 km	MPC · JPL
169093	2001 KK_{22}	—	May 17, 2001	Socorro	LINEAR	EUN	1.8 km	MPC · JPL
169094	2001 KQ_{32}	—	May 24, 2001	Kitt Peak	Spacewatch	·	3.3 km	MPC · JPL
169095	2001 KT_{36}	—	May 21, 2001	Socorro	LINEAR	EUN	2.0 km	MPC · JPL
169096	2001 KP_{49}	—	May 24, 2001	Socorro	LINEAR	·	4.8 km	MPC · JPL
169097	2001 KT_{53}	—	May 18, 2001	Haleakala	NEAT	·	3.7 km	MPC · JPL
169098	2001 KW_{58}	—	May 26, 2001	Socorro	LINEAR	·	4.6 km	MPC · JPL
169099	2001 KC_{63}	—	May 18, 2001	Haleakala	NEAT	·	2.8 km	MPC · JPL
169100	2001 KX_{69}	—	May 22, 2001	Socorro	LINEAR	·	2.6 km	MPC · JPL

== 169101–169200 ==
back to top

Designation			Discovery			Properties		Ref
Permanent	Provisional	Named after	Date	Site	Discoverer(s)	Category	Diam.	Ref
169101	2001 KD_{72}	—	May 24, 2001	Socorro	LINEAR	·	2.2 km	MPC · JPL
169102	2001 KW_{75}	—	May 26, 2001	Socorro	LINEAR	GEF	2.2 km	MPC · JPL
169103	2001 LB_{3}	—	June 13, 2001	Socorro	LINEAR	·	1.5 km	MPC · JPL
169104	2001 NN_{8}	—	July 14, 2001	Palomar	NEAT	KOR	2.5 km	MPC · JPL
169105	2001 NK_{10}	—	July 14, 2001	Haleakala	NEAT	·	3.1 km	MPC · JPL
169106	2001 OK_{4}	—	July 19, 2001	Palomar	NEAT	·	3.2 km	MPC · JPL
169107	2001 OW_{7}	—	July 17, 2001	Anderson Mesa	LONEOS	·	4.5 km	MPC · JPL
169108	2001 OO_{17}	—	July 17, 2001	Palomar	NEAT	·	3.2 km	MPC · JPL
169109	2001 OY_{24}	—	July 16, 2001	Haleakala	NEAT	LIX	7.4 km	MPC · JPL
169110	2001 OF_{34}	—	July 19, 2001	Palomar	NEAT	·	3.1 km	MPC · JPL
169111	2001 OV_{35}	—	July 21, 2001	Haleakala	NEAT	·	3.4 km	MPC · JPL
169112	2001 OS_{42}	—	July 22, 2001	Palomar	NEAT	EMA	4.8 km	MPC · JPL
169113	2001 OB_{43}	—	July 22, 2001	Palomar	NEAT	EOS	4.6 km	MPC · JPL
169114	2001 OK_{47}	—	July 16, 2001	Anderson Mesa	LONEOS	·	7.1 km	MPC · JPL
169115	2001 OC_{62}	—	July 21, 2001	Haleakala	NEAT	·	5.1 km	MPC · JPL
169116	2001 OT_{69}	—	July 19, 2001	Anderson Mesa	LONEOS	·	5.0 km	MPC · JPL
169117	2001 OZ_{74}	—	July 29, 2001	Socorro	LINEAR	·	4.2 km	MPC · JPL
169118	2001 OG_{78}	—	July 26, 2001	Palomar	NEAT	EOS	2.9 km	MPC · JPL
169119	2001 OE_{79}	—	July 27, 2001	Palomar	NEAT	·	3.7 km	MPC · JPL
169120	2001 PV_{7}	—	August 10, 2001	Palomar	NEAT	EOS	3.0 km	MPC · JPL
169121	2001 PJ_{16}	—	August 9, 2001	Palomar	NEAT	·	4.1 km	MPC · JPL
169122	2001 PQ_{24}	—	August 11, 2001	Haleakala	NEAT	·	5.0 km	MPC · JPL
169123	2001 PD_{25}	—	August 11, 2001	Haleakala	NEAT	·	4.3 km	MPC · JPL
169124	2001 PZ_{25}	—	August 11, 2001	Haleakala	NEAT	GEF	2.1 km	MPC · JPL
169125	2001 PZ_{27}	—	August 13, 2001	Haleakala	NEAT	·	3.3 km	MPC · JPL
169126	2001 PP_{30}	—	August 10, 2001	Palomar	NEAT	EOS	2.9 km	MPC · JPL
169127	2001 PD_{31}	—	August 10, 2001	Palomar	NEAT	·	4.1 km	MPC · JPL
169128	2001 PT_{34}	—	August 10, 2001	Palomar	NEAT	EOS	3.6 km	MPC · JPL
169129	2001 PW_{35}	—	August 11, 2001	Haleakala	NEAT	·	4.2 km	MPC · JPL
169130	2001 PV_{40}	—	August 11, 2001	Palomar	NEAT	H	1.1 km	MPC · JPL
169131	2001 PR_{46}	—	August 13, 2001	Palomar	NEAT	·	3.7 km	MPC · JPL
169132	2001 PP_{52}	—	August 15, 2001	Haleakala	NEAT	EOS	3.1 km	MPC · JPL
169133	2001 PT_{54}	—	August 14, 2001	Haleakala	NEAT	·	5.2 km	MPC · JPL
169134	2001 QB_{36}	—	August 16, 2001	Socorro	LINEAR	·	3.4 km	MPC · JPL
169135	2001 QM_{42}	—	August 16, 2001	Socorro	LINEAR	EOS	2.9 km	MPC · JPL
169136	2001 QD_{52}	—	August 16, 2001	Socorro	LINEAR	TIR	4.3 km	MPC · JPL
169137	2001 QM_{57}	—	August 16, 2001	Socorro	LINEAR	·	8.3 km	MPC · JPL
169138	2001 QG_{59}	—	August 17, 2001	Socorro	LINEAR	·	7.5 km	MPC · JPL
169139	2001 QK_{72}	—	August 21, 2001	Kitt Peak	Spacewatch	·	3.6 km	MPC · JPL
169140	2001 QO_{87}	—	August 17, 2001	Palomar	NEAT	·	7.1 km	MPC · JPL
169141	2001 QQ_{92}	—	August 22, 2001	Socorro	LINEAR	·	4.7 km	MPC · JPL
169142	2001 QD_{108}	—	August 25, 2001	Anderson Mesa	LONEOS	·	3.7 km	MPC · JPL
169143	2001 QG_{113}	—	August 25, 2001	Socorro	LINEAR	·	5.4 km	MPC · JPL
169144	2001 QT_{115}	—	August 17, 2001	Socorro	LINEAR	·	3.7 km	MPC · JPL
169145	2001 QH_{121}	—	August 19, 2001	Socorro	LINEAR	EOS	3.4 km	MPC · JPL
169146	2001 QL_{121}	—	August 19, 2001	Socorro	LINEAR	KOR	2.5 km	MPC · JPL
169147	2001 QB_{126}	—	August 19, 2001	Socorro	LINEAR	·	5.4 km	MPC · JPL
169148	2001 QG_{127}	—	August 20, 2001	Socorro	LINEAR	·	5.3 km	MPC · JPL
169149	2001 QO_{133}	—	August 21, 2001	Socorro	LINEAR	EOS	3.8 km	MPC · JPL
169150	2001 QB_{156}	—	August 23, 2001	Anderson Mesa	LONEOS	·	4.1 km	MPC · JPL
169151	2001 QA_{157}	—	August 23, 2001	Anderson Mesa	LONEOS	HYG	4.8 km	MPC · JPL
169152	2001 QA_{163}	—	August 23, 2001	Anderson Mesa	LONEOS	·	4.2 km	MPC · JPL
169153	2001 QV_{166}	—	August 24, 2001	Haleakala	NEAT	·	3.7 km	MPC · JPL
169154	2001 QJ_{172}	—	August 25, 2001	Socorro	LINEAR	EOS	2.9 km	MPC · JPL
169155	2001 QS_{179}	—	August 25, 2001	Palomar	NEAT	·	2.5 km	MPC · JPL
169156	2001 QS_{183}	—	August 28, 2001	Bergisch Gladbach	W. Bickel	·	3.8 km	MPC · JPL
169157	2001 QH_{187}	—	August 21, 2001	Palomar	NEAT	·	8.9 km	MPC · JPL
169158	2001 QZ_{187}	—	August 21, 2001	Haleakala	NEAT	·	6.8 km	MPC · JPL
169159	2001 QQ_{191}	—	August 22, 2001	Socorro	LINEAR	·	7.4 km	MPC · JPL
169160	2001 QG_{194}	—	August 22, 2001	Socorro	LINEAR	·	2.3 km	MPC · JPL
169161	2001 QU_{202}	—	August 23, 2001	Anderson Mesa	LONEOS	·	3.0 km	MPC · JPL
169162	2001 QJ_{204}	—	August 23, 2001	Anderson Mesa	LONEOS	EOS	3.6 km	MPC · JPL
169163	2001 QZ_{205}	—	August 23, 2001	Anderson Mesa	LONEOS	·	4.3 km	MPC · JPL
169164	2001 QF_{209}	—	August 23, 2001	Anderson Mesa	LONEOS	·	3.6 km	MPC · JPL
169165	2001 QF_{213}	—	August 23, 2001	Anderson Mesa	LONEOS	EUP	6.1 km	MPC · JPL
169166	2001 QD_{218}	—	August 23, 2001	Anderson Mesa	LONEOS	·	2.6 km	MPC · JPL
169167	2001 QO_{225}	—	August 24, 2001	Anderson Mesa	LONEOS	EOS	3.3 km	MPC · JPL
169168	2001 QS_{225}	—	August 24, 2001	Anderson Mesa	LONEOS	·	6.2 km	MPC · JPL
169169	2001 QU_{225}	—	August 24, 2001	Anderson Mesa	LONEOS	EOS	3.1 km	MPC · JPL
169170	2001 QQ_{231}	—	August 24, 2001	Anderson Mesa	LONEOS	·	4.2 km	MPC · JPL
169171	2001 QW_{231}	—	August 24, 2001	Anderson Mesa	LONEOS	·	4.4 km	MPC · JPL
169172	2001 QA_{232}	—	August 24, 2001	Anderson Mesa	LONEOS	·	6.7 km	MPC · JPL
169173	2001 QU_{233}	—	August 24, 2001	Socorro	LINEAR	·	4.4 km	MPC · JPL
169174	2001 QC_{234}	—	August 24, 2001	Socorro	LINEAR	HYG	4.6 km	MPC · JPL
169175	2001 QZ_{241}	—	August 24, 2001	Socorro	LINEAR	·	4.8 km	MPC · JPL
169176	2001 QN_{253}	—	August 25, 2001	Socorro	LINEAR	·	2.6 km	MPC · JPL
169177	2001 QP_{259}	—	August 25, 2001	Socorro	LINEAR	EOS	3.1 km	MPC · JPL
169178	2001 QH_{260}	—	August 25, 2001	Socorro	LINEAR	·	5.0 km	MPC · JPL
169179	2001 QF_{266}	—	August 20, 2001	Socorro	LINEAR	·	4.7 km	MPC · JPL
169180	2001 QE_{269}	—	August 20, 2001	Haleakala	NEAT	EOS	3.6 km	MPC · JPL
169181	2001 QQ_{276}	—	August 19, 2001	Socorro	LINEAR	·	5.7 km	MPC · JPL
169182	2001 QJ_{283}	—	August 18, 2001	Anderson Mesa	LONEOS	·	4.7 km	MPC · JPL
169183	2001 QN_{289}	—	August 16, 2001	Socorro	LINEAR	·	3.8 km	MPC · JPL
169184 Jameslee	2001 QQ_{306}	Jameslee	August 19, 2001	Cerro Tololo	M. W. Buie	·	4.0 km	MPC · JPL
169185	2001 RL_{2}	—	September 8, 2001	Socorro	LINEAR	EUP	6.8 km	MPC · JPL
169186	2001 RZ_{2}	—	September 8, 2001	Anderson Mesa	LONEOS	·	4.5 km	MPC · JPL
169187	2001 RZ_{9}	—	September 10, 2001	Socorro	LINEAR	·	5.9 km	MPC · JPL
169188	2001 RF_{18}	—	September 7, 2001	Socorro	LINEAR	·	4.8 km	MPC · JPL
169189	2001 RZ_{28}	—	September 7, 2001	Socorro	LINEAR	·	4.2 km	MPC · JPL
169190	2001 RT_{29}	—	September 7, 2001	Socorro	LINEAR	·	5.5 km	MPC · JPL
169191	2001 RF_{30}	—	September 7, 2001	Socorro	LINEAR	·	5.0 km	MPC · JPL
169192	2001 RR_{37}	—	September 8, 2001	Socorro	LINEAR	·	3.9 km	MPC · JPL
169193	2001 RS_{37}	—	September 8, 2001	Socorro	LINEAR	EOS	2.9 km	MPC · JPL
169194	2001 RX_{44}	—	September 9, 2001	Palomar	NEAT	·	3.3 km	MPC · JPL
169195	2001 RP_{54}	—	September 12, 2001	Socorro	LINEAR	·	3.5 km	MPC · JPL
169196	2001 RV_{56}	—	September 12, 2001	Socorro	LINEAR	·	4.4 km	MPC · JPL
169197	2001 RT_{61}	—	September 12, 2001	Socorro	LINEAR	·	5.4 km	MPC · JPL
169198	2001 RG_{66}	—	September 10, 2001	Socorro	LINEAR	·	4.1 km	MPC · JPL
169199	2001 RH_{67}	—	September 10, 2001	Socorro	LINEAR	HYG	6.3 km	MPC · JPL
169200	2001 RB_{74}	—	September 10, 2001	Socorro	LINEAR	·	7.1 km	MPC · JPL

== 169201–169300 ==
back to top

Designation			Discovery			Properties		Ref
Permanent	Provisional	Named after	Date	Site	Discoverer(s)	Category	Diam.	Ref
169201	2001 RC_{82}	—	September 11, 2001	Anderson Mesa	LONEOS	·	7.2 km	MPC · JPL
169202	2001 RD_{82}	—	September 11, 2001	Anderson Mesa	LONEOS	TIR	4.5 km	MPC · JPL
169203	2001 RK_{82}	—	September 11, 2001	Anderson Mesa	LONEOS	·	5.3 km	MPC · JPL
169204	2001 RO_{82}	—	September 11, 2001	Anderson Mesa	LONEOS	·	4.6 km	MPC · JPL
169205	2001 RS_{82}	—	September 11, 2001	Anderson Mesa	LONEOS	EOS	2.8 km	MPC · JPL
169206	2001 RU_{89}	—	September 11, 2001	Anderson Mesa	LONEOS	·	4.3 km	MPC · JPL
169207	2001 RX_{95}	—	September 11, 2001	Kitt Peak	Spacewatch	·	6.0 km	MPC · JPL
169208	2001 RD_{100}	—	September 12, 2001	Socorro	LINEAR	EOS	3.1 km	MPC · JPL
169209	2001 RS_{101}	—	September 12, 2001	Socorro	LINEAR	·	4.9 km	MPC · JPL
169210	2001 RE_{106}	—	September 12, 2001	Socorro	LINEAR	·	5.9 km	MPC · JPL
169211	2001 RF_{110}	—	September 12, 2001	Socorro	LINEAR	·	4.4 km	MPC · JPL
169212	2001 RS_{110}	—	September 12, 2001	Socorro	LINEAR	LIX	5.9 km	MPC · JPL
169213	2001 RQ_{111}	—	September 12, 2001	Socorro	LINEAR	·	3.0 km	MPC · JPL
169214	2001 RG_{115}	—	September 12, 2001	Socorro	LINEAR	·	4.5 km	MPC · JPL
169215	2001 RX_{116}	—	September 12, 2001	Socorro	LINEAR	EOS	3.3 km	MPC · JPL
169216	2001 RH_{120}	—	September 12, 2001	Socorro	LINEAR	·	5.7 km	MPC · JPL
169217	2001 RP_{121}	—	September 12, 2001	Socorro	LINEAR	·	5.6 km	MPC · JPL
169218	2001 RP_{127}	—	September 12, 2001	Socorro	LINEAR	THM	3.9 km	MPC · JPL
169219	2001 RU_{133}	—	September 12, 2001	Socorro	LINEAR	·	4.5 km	MPC · JPL
169220	2001 RP_{137}	—	September 12, 2001	Socorro	LINEAR	·	2.7 km	MPC · JPL
169221	2001 RZ_{139}	—	September 12, 2001	Socorro	LINEAR	·	2.9 km	MPC · JPL
169222	2001 RJ_{145}	—	September 8, 2001	Socorro	LINEAR	EOS	3.4 km	MPC · JPL
169223	2001 RO_{146}	—	September 9, 2001	Anderson Mesa	LONEOS	·	5.8 km	MPC · JPL
169224	2001 RO_{148}	—	September 10, 2001	Anderson Mesa	LONEOS	EOS	3.3 km	MPC · JPL
169225	2001 RU_{151}	—	September 11, 2001	Anderson Mesa	LONEOS	·	3.7 km	MPC · JPL
169226	2001 SS_{6}	—	September 18, 2001	Kitt Peak	Spacewatch	·	3.1 km	MPC · JPL
169227	2001 SX_{10}	—	September 16, 2001	Socorro	LINEAR	EUP	7.8 km	MPC · JPL
169228	2001 SD_{14}	—	September 16, 2001	Socorro	LINEAR	·	4.7 km	MPC · JPL
169229	2001 SB_{17}	—	September 16, 2001	Socorro	LINEAR	·	7.0 km	MPC · JPL
169230	2001 SF_{17}	—	September 16, 2001	Socorro	LINEAR	·	5.8 km	MPC · JPL
169231	2001 SO_{17}	—	September 16, 2001	Socorro	LINEAR	·	6.7 km	MPC · JPL
169232	2001 SB_{24}	—	September 16, 2001	Socorro	LINEAR	VER	7.4 km	MPC · JPL
169233	2001 SF_{32}	—	September 16, 2001	Socorro	LINEAR	·	4.7 km	MPC · JPL
169234	2001 SQ_{32}	—	September 16, 2001	Socorro	LINEAR	KOR	2.3 km	MPC · JPL
169235	2001 SO_{35}	—	September 16, 2001	Socorro	LINEAR	KOR	2.4 km	MPC · JPL
169236	2001 SW_{58}	—	September 17, 2001	Socorro	LINEAR	·	3.9 km	MPC · JPL
169237	2001 SF_{72}	—	September 17, 2001	Socorro	LINEAR	·	3.8 km	MPC · JPL
169238	2001 SE_{77}	—	September 17, 2001	Socorro	LINEAR	·	6.6 km	MPC · JPL
169239	2001 ST_{79}	—	September 20, 2001	Socorro	LINEAR	·	4.2 km	MPC · JPL
169240	2001 SN_{83}	—	September 20, 2001	Socorro	LINEAR	·	3.2 km	MPC · JPL
169241	2001 SV_{85}	—	September 20, 2001	Socorro	LINEAR	·	4.4 km	MPC · JPL
169242	2001 SR_{91}	—	September 20, 2001	Socorro	LINEAR	EOS	3.4 km	MPC · JPL
169243	2001 SR_{92}	—	September 20, 2001	Socorro	LINEAR	·	4.1 km	MPC · JPL
169244	2001 SG_{94}	—	September 20, 2001	Socorro	LINEAR	·	3.4 km	MPC · JPL
169245	2001 SM_{94}	—	September 20, 2001	Socorro	LINEAR	·	3.9 km	MPC · JPL
169246	2001 SQ_{96}	—	September 20, 2001	Socorro	LINEAR	·	4.0 km	MPC · JPL
169247	2001 SF_{98}	—	September 20, 2001	Socorro	LINEAR	·	5.5 km	MPC · JPL
169248	2001 ST_{98}	—	September 20, 2001	Socorro	LINEAR	·	3.8 km	MPC · JPL
169249	2001 SA_{102}	—	September 20, 2001	Socorro	LINEAR	·	4.9 km	MPC · JPL
169250	2001 SW_{102}	—	September 20, 2001	Socorro	LINEAR	HYG	4.7 km	MPC · JPL
169251	2001 SG_{113}	—	September 20, 2001	Desert Eagle	W. K. Y. Yeung	EOS	3.1 km	MPC · JPL
169252	2001 SC_{116}	—	September 22, 2001	Goodricke-Pigott	R. A. Tucker	HYG	4.5 km	MPC · JPL
169253	2001 SZ_{118}	—	September 16, 2001	Socorro	LINEAR	·	3.2 km	MPC · JPL
169254	2001 SH_{120}	—	September 16, 2001	Socorro	LINEAR	·	3.6 km	MPC · JPL
169255	2001 SP_{129}	—	September 16, 2001	Socorro	LINEAR	·	7.4 km	MPC · JPL
169256	2001 SW_{147}	—	September 17, 2001	Socorro	LINEAR	·	4.4 km	MPC · JPL
169257	2001 SB_{150}	—	September 17, 2001	Socorro	LINEAR	·	4.3 km	MPC · JPL
169258	2001 SH_{157}	—	September 17, 2001	Socorro	LINEAR	·	5.6 km	MPC · JPL
169259	2001 ST_{165}	—	September 19, 2001	Socorro	LINEAR	THM	3.2 km	MPC · JPL
169260	2001 SM_{169}	—	September 22, 2001	Eskridge	G. Hug	·	3.4 km	MPC · JPL
169261	2001 SN_{170}	—	September 16, 2001	Socorro	LINEAR	·	7.3 km	MPC · JPL
169262	2001 SZ_{170}	—	September 16, 2001	Socorro	LINEAR	·	3.5 km	MPC · JPL
169263	2001 SV_{175}	—	September 16, 2001	Socorro	LINEAR	·	5.4 km	MPC · JPL
169264	2001 SQ_{176}	—	September 16, 2001	Socorro	LINEAR	·	4.4 km	MPC · JPL
169265	2001 SV_{176}	—	September 16, 2001	Socorro	LINEAR	·	4.1 km	MPC · JPL
169266	2001 SP_{182}	—	September 19, 2001	Socorro	LINEAR	·	2.8 km	MPC · JPL
169267	2001 SE_{186}	—	September 19, 2001	Socorro	LINEAR	·	6.2 km	MPC · JPL
169268	2001 SN_{186}	—	September 19, 2001	Socorro	LINEAR	·	5.4 km	MPC · JPL
169269	2001 SN_{194}	—	September 19, 2001	Socorro	LINEAR	·	6.2 km	MPC · JPL
169270	2001 SH_{201}	—	September 19, 2001	Socorro	LINEAR	EOS	3.0 km	MPC · JPL
169271	2001 SX_{204}	—	September 19, 2001	Socorro	LINEAR	·	3.4 km	MPC · JPL
169272	2001 SM_{210}	—	September 19, 2001	Socorro	LINEAR	THB	4.6 km	MPC · JPL
169273	2001 SR_{210}	—	September 19, 2001	Socorro	LINEAR	·	4.7 km	MPC · JPL
169274	2001 SB_{211}	—	September 19, 2001	Socorro	LINEAR	THM	3.4 km	MPC · JPL
169275	2001 SK_{211}	—	September 19, 2001	Socorro	LINEAR	·	5.8 km	MPC · JPL
169276	2001 SS_{215}	—	September 19, 2001	Socorro	LINEAR	·	3.1 km	MPC · JPL
169277	2001 SN_{219}	—	September 19, 2001	Socorro	LINEAR	THM	3.1 km	MPC · JPL
169278	2001 SE_{222}	—	September 19, 2001	Socorro	LINEAR	THM	3.2 km	MPC · JPL
169279	2001 SL_{230}	—	September 19, 2001	Socorro	LINEAR	·	5.8 km	MPC · JPL
169280	2001 SQ_{231}	—	September 19, 2001	Socorro	LINEAR	·	4.2 km	MPC · JPL
169281	2001 SM_{234}	—	September 19, 2001	Socorro	LINEAR	·	4.3 km	MPC · JPL
169282	2001 ST_{238}	—	September 19, 2001	Socorro	LINEAR	VER	6.4 km	MPC · JPL
169283	2001 SS_{239}	—	September 19, 2001	Socorro	LINEAR	HYG	4.8 km	MPC · JPL
169284	2001 SB_{248}	—	September 19, 2001	Socorro	LINEAR	·	3.0 km	MPC · JPL
169285	2001 SY_{251}	—	September 19, 2001	Socorro	LINEAR	·	4.5 km	MPC · JPL
169286	2001 SG_{255}	—	September 19, 2001	Socorro	LINEAR	LIX	6.3 km	MPC · JPL
169287	2001 ST_{264}	—	September 25, 2001	Desert Eagle	W. K. Y. Yeung	·	3.8 km	MPC · JPL
169288	2001 SD_{290}	—	September 29, 2001	Palomar	NEAT	·	4.1 km	MPC · JPL
169289	2001 SD_{299}	—	September 20, 2001	Socorro	LINEAR	·	4.7 km	MPC · JPL
169290	2001 SM_{302}	—	September 20, 2001	Socorro	LINEAR	·	3.9 km	MPC · JPL
169291	2001 SG_{304}	—	September 20, 2001	Socorro	LINEAR	KOR	2.0 km	MPC · JPL
169292	2001 SF_{306}	—	September 20, 2001	Socorro	LINEAR	·	3.6 km	MPC · JPL
169293	2001 SQ_{314}	—	September 23, 2001	Socorro	LINEAR	·	5.6 km	MPC · JPL
169294	2001 SC_{315}	—	September 25, 2001	Socorro	LINEAR	·	5.7 km	MPC · JPL
169295	2001 SP_{324}	—	September 16, 2001	Socorro	LINEAR	EOS	3.7 km	MPC · JPL
169296	2001 SW_{333}	—	September 19, 2001	Kitt Peak	Spacewatch	·	3.3 km	MPC · JPL
169297	2001 SR_{349}	—	September 19, 2001	Anderson Mesa	LONEOS	·	5.9 km	MPC · JPL
169298	2001 SS_{349}	—	September 19, 2001	Anderson Mesa	LONEOS	·	4.3 km	MPC · JPL
169299 Sirko	2001 SK_{353}	Sirko	September 21, 2001	Apache Point	SDSS	EOS ·	5.6 km	MPC · JPL
169300	2001 SL_{353}	—	September 21, 2001	Socorro	LINEAR	·	4.1 km	MPC · JPL

== 169301–169400 ==
back to top

Designation			Discovery			Properties		Ref
Permanent	Provisional	Named after	Date	Site	Discoverer(s)	Category	Diam.	Ref
169301	2001 TO_{2}	—	October 6, 2001	Palomar	NEAT	·	3.7 km	MPC · JPL
169302	2001 TF_{3}	—	October 7, 2001	Palomar	NEAT	·	4.8 km	MPC · JPL
169303	2001 TB_{12}	—	October 13, 2001	Socorro	LINEAR	·	5.8 km	MPC · JPL
169304	2001 TB_{23}	—	October 13, 2001	Socorro	LINEAR	·	3.3 km	MPC · JPL
169305	2001 TJ_{49}	—	October 15, 2001	Desert Eagle	W. K. Y. Yeung	·	4.9 km	MPC · JPL
169306	2001 TX_{60}	—	October 13, 2001	Socorro	LINEAR	·	5.4 km	MPC · JPL
169307	2001 TC_{66}	—	October 13, 2001	Socorro	LINEAR	·	4.5 km	MPC · JPL
169308	2001 TA_{70}	—	October 13, 2001	Socorro	LINEAR	·	4.7 km	MPC · JPL
169309	2001 TF_{81}	—	October 14, 2001	Socorro	LINEAR	·	3.8 km	MPC · JPL
169310	2001 TQ_{81}	—	October 14, 2001	Socorro	LINEAR	·	5.9 km	MPC · JPL
169311	2001 TV_{81}	—	October 14, 2001	Socorro	LINEAR	·	5.6 km	MPC · JPL
169312	2001 TM_{99}	—	October 14, 2001	Socorro	LINEAR	·	5.0 km	MPC · JPL
169313	2001 TJ_{106}	—	October 13, 2001	Socorro	LINEAR	THB	5.8 km	MPC · JPL
169314	2001 TP_{109}	—	October 14, 2001	Socorro	LINEAR	VER	5.2 km	MPC · JPL
169315	2001 TH_{111}	—	October 14, 2001	Socorro	LINEAR	HYG	6.1 km	MPC · JPL
169316	2001 TJ_{120}	—	October 15, 2001	Socorro	LINEAR	·	7.8 km	MPC · JPL
169317	2001 TZ_{124}	—	October 12, 2001	Haleakala	NEAT	·	5.5 km	MPC · JPL
169318	2001 TH_{132}	—	October 11, 2001	Palomar	NEAT	·	4.3 km	MPC · JPL
169319	2001 TS_{133}	—	October 12, 2001	Haleakala	NEAT	·	5.9 km	MPC · JPL
169320	2001 TC_{138}	—	October 14, 2001	Haleakala	NEAT	T_{j} (2.98) · EUP	7.7 km	MPC · JPL
169321	2001 TP_{142}	—	October 10, 2001	Palomar	NEAT	·	4.6 km	MPC · JPL
169322	2001 TJ_{144}	—	October 10, 2001	Palomar	NEAT	·	6.4 km	MPC · JPL
169323	2001 TK_{146}	—	October 10, 2001	Palomar	NEAT	·	6.3 km	MPC · JPL
169324	2001 TU_{149}	—	October 10, 2001	Palomar	NEAT	·	4.4 km	MPC · JPL
169325	2001 TU_{150}	—	October 10, 2001	Palomar	NEAT	·	4.2 km	MPC · JPL
169326	2001 TO_{151}	—	October 10, 2001	Palomar	NEAT	·	6.1 km	MPC · JPL
169327	2001 TX_{154}	—	October 15, 2001	Palomar	NEAT	·	4.4 km	MPC · JPL
169328	2001 TN_{157}	—	October 14, 2001	Kitt Peak	Spacewatch	·	2.6 km	MPC · JPL
169329	2001 TX_{159}	—	October 13, 2001	Palomar	NEAT	·	7.0 km	MPC · JPL
169330	2001 TZ_{162}	—	October 11, 2001	Palomar	NEAT	·	3.5 km	MPC · JPL
169331	2001 TB_{165}	—	October 15, 2001	Haleakala	NEAT	·	3.7 km	MPC · JPL
169332	2001 TU_{166}	—	October 15, 2001	Socorro	LINEAR	·	4.7 km	MPC · JPL
169333	2001 TE_{172}	—	October 13, 2001	Socorro	LINEAR	·	5.6 km	MPC · JPL
169334	2001 TQ_{176}	—	October 14, 2001	Socorro	LINEAR	·	2.9 km	MPC · JPL
169335	2001 TK_{178}	—	October 14, 2001	Socorro	LINEAR	·	5.4 km	MPC · JPL
169336	2001 TO_{178}	—	October 14, 2001	Socorro	LINEAR	·	6.9 km	MPC · JPL
169337	2001 TP_{178}	—	October 14, 2001	Socorro	LINEAR	EOS	2.9 km	MPC · JPL
169338	2001 TP_{186}	—	October 14, 2001	Socorro	LINEAR	VER	4.6 km	MPC · JPL
169339	2001 TO_{191}	—	October 14, 2001	Socorro	LINEAR	·	6.6 km	MPC · JPL
169340	2001 TR_{193}	—	October 15, 2001	Socorro	LINEAR	·	3.9 km	MPC · JPL
169341	2001 TL_{200}	—	October 11, 2001	Socorro	LINEAR	URS	6.3 km	MPC · JPL
169342	2001 TA_{204}	—	October 11, 2001	Socorro	LINEAR	EOS	3.2 km	MPC · JPL
169343	2001 TD_{205}	—	October 11, 2001	Socorro	LINEAR	EOS	3.3 km	MPC · JPL
169344	2001 TW_{207}	—	October 11, 2001	Palomar	NEAT	THM	2.7 km	MPC · JPL
169345	2001 TS_{211}	—	October 13, 2001	Socorro	LINEAR	URS	6.5 km	MPC · JPL
169346	2001 TZ_{221}	—	October 14, 2001	Socorro	LINEAR	HYG	3.7 km	MPC · JPL
169347	2001 TM_{233}	—	October 15, 2001	Haleakala	NEAT	·	5.1 km	MPC · JPL
169348	2001 TG_{238}	—	October 15, 2001	Palomar	NEAT	·	3.5 km	MPC · JPL
169349	2001 TA_{240}	—	October 10, 2001	Palomar	NEAT	·	4.3 km	MPC · JPL
169350	2001 US_{5}	—	October 21, 2001	Desert Eagle	W. K. Y. Yeung	·	6.4 km	MPC · JPL
169351	2001 UT_{7}	—	October 17, 2001	Socorro	LINEAR	EOS	3.3 km	MPC · JPL
169352	2001 UY_{16}	—	October 23, 2001	Socorro	LINEAR	AMO · APO	320 m	MPC · JPL
169353	2001 UL_{17}	—	October 24, 2001	Desert Eagle	W. K. Y. Yeung	·	7.5 km	MPC · JPL
169354	2001 UF_{24}	—	October 18, 2001	Socorro	LINEAR	·	6.3 km	MPC · JPL
169355	2001 UO_{31}	—	October 16, 2001	Socorro	LINEAR	·	7.4 km	MPC · JPL
169356	2001 UY_{40}	—	October 17, 2001	Socorro	LINEAR	LIX	6.4 km	MPC · JPL
169357	2001 UR_{46}	—	October 17, 2001	Socorro	LINEAR	·	4.3 km	MPC · JPL
169358	2001 UV_{57}	—	October 17, 2001	Socorro	LINEAR	·	5.8 km	MPC · JPL
169359	2001 UN_{63}	—	October 17, 2001	Socorro	LINEAR	URS	7.5 km	MPC · JPL
169360	2001 UE_{64}	—	October 18, 2001	Socorro	LINEAR	·	6.0 km	MPC · JPL
169361	2001 UQ_{75}	—	October 17, 2001	Socorro	LINEAR	·	5.7 km	MPC · JPL
169362	2001 UV_{84}	—	October 21, 2001	Socorro	LINEAR	·	5.2 km	MPC · JPL
169363	2001 UE_{85}	—	October 16, 2001	Kitt Peak	Spacewatch	THM	2.4 km	MPC · JPL
169364	2001 UH_{89}	—	October 22, 2001	Palomar	NEAT	·	5.6 km	MPC · JPL
169365	2001 UO_{96}	—	October 17, 2001	Socorro	LINEAR	·	4.0 km	MPC · JPL
169366	2001 UF_{103}	—	October 20, 2001	Socorro	LINEAR	·	3.5 km	MPC · JPL
169367	2001 UA_{105}	—	October 20, 2001	Socorro	LINEAR	·	4.0 km	MPC · JPL
169368	2001 UJ_{111}	—	October 21, 2001	Socorro	LINEAR	·	7.1 km	MPC · JPL
169369	2001 UK_{111}	—	October 21, 2001	Socorro	LINEAR	HYG	5.5 km	MPC · JPL
169370	2001 UY_{125}	—	October 23, 2001	Palomar	NEAT	·	3.7 km	MPC · JPL
169371	2001 UX_{136}	—	October 23, 2001	Socorro	LINEAR	HYG	5.6 km	MPC · JPL
169372	2001 UF_{137}	—	October 23, 2001	Socorro	LINEAR	·	4.1 km	MPC · JPL
169373	2001 UT_{150}	—	October 23, 2001	Socorro	LINEAR	·	8.3 km	MPC · JPL
169374	2001 UK_{161}	—	October 23, 2001	Socorro	LINEAR	LIX	7.0 km	MPC · JPL
169375	2001 UK_{173}	—	October 18, 2001	Palomar	NEAT	THM	3.2 km	MPC · JPL
169376	2001 UA_{174}	—	October 18, 2001	Palomar	NEAT	VER	5.5 km	MPC · JPL
169377	2001 UV_{178}	—	October 24, 2001	Palomar	NEAT	·	5.8 km	MPC · JPL
169378	2001 UR_{182}	—	October 16, 2001	Socorro	LINEAR	EOS	3.2 km	MPC · JPL
169379	2001 UH_{189}	—	October 18, 2001	Socorro	LINEAR	·	6.2 km	MPC · JPL
169380	2001 UD_{193}	—	October 18, 2001	Socorro	LINEAR	·	4.5 km	MPC · JPL
169381	2001 UF_{205}	—	October 19, 2001	Palomar	NEAT	3:2	6.6 km	MPC · JPL
169382	2001 UL_{209}	—	October 20, 2001	Palomar	NEAT	EOS	3.3 km	MPC · JPL
169383	2001 VY_{7}	—	November 9, 2001	Socorro	LINEAR	·	4.2 km	MPC · JPL
169384	2001 VU_{19}	—	November 9, 2001	Socorro	LINEAR	·	1.1 km	MPC · JPL
169385	2001 VC_{26}	—	November 9, 2001	Socorro	LINEAR	·	4.8 km	MPC · JPL
169386	2001 VB_{29}	—	November 9, 2001	Socorro	LINEAR	·	4.4 km	MPC · JPL
169387	2001 VC_{40}	—	November 9, 2001	Socorro	LINEAR	(260) · CYB	6.7 km	MPC · JPL
169388	2001 VP_{43}	—	November 9, 2001	Socorro	LINEAR	·	6.3 km	MPC · JPL
169389	2001 VD_{50}	—	November 10, 2001	Socorro	LINEAR	·	5.0 km	MPC · JPL
169390	2001 VR_{51}	—	November 10, 2001	Socorro	LINEAR	EOS	3.5 km	MPC · JPL
169391	2001 VU_{61}	—	November 10, 2001	Socorro	LINEAR	·	3.9 km	MPC · JPL
169392	2001 VA_{65}	—	November 10, 2001	Socorro	LINEAR	·	6.0 km	MPC · JPL
169393	2001 VN_{90}	—	November 15, 2001	Socorro	LINEAR	·	5.6 km	MPC · JPL
169394	2001 VQ_{93}	—	November 15, 2001	Socorro	LINEAR	·	8.1 km	MPC · JPL
169395	2001 VL_{94}	—	November 15, 2001	Socorro	LINEAR	TIR	4.5 km	MPC · JPL
169396	2001 VS_{104}	—	November 12, 2001	Socorro	LINEAR	·	3.1 km	MPC · JPL
169397	2001 VE_{113}	—	November 12, 2001	Socorro	LINEAR	·	7.2 km	MPC · JPL
169398	2001 VP_{119}	—	November 12, 2001	Socorro	LINEAR	VER	5.9 km	MPC · JPL
169399	2001 WX	—	November 16, 2001	Kitt Peak	Spacewatch	·	1.3 km	MPC · JPL
169400	2001 WA_{30}	—	November 17, 2001	Socorro	LINEAR	·	6.9 km	MPC · JPL

== 169401–169500 ==
back to top

Designation			Discovery			Properties		Ref
Permanent	Provisional	Named after	Date	Site	Discoverer(s)	Category	Diam.	Ref
169401	2001 WS_{37}	—	November 17, 2001	Socorro	LINEAR	·	6.6 km	MPC · JPL
169402	2001 WE_{67}	—	November 20, 2001	Socorro	LINEAR	·	3.1 km	MPC · JPL
169403	2001 WY_{89}	—	November 21, 2001	Socorro	LINEAR	·	6.1 km	MPC · JPL
169404	2001 XF_{15}	—	December 10, 2001	Socorro	LINEAR	SYL · CYB	6.4 km	MPC · JPL
169405	2001 XK_{39}	—	December 9, 2001	Socorro	LINEAR	LIX	8.6 km	MPC · JPL
169406	2001 XR_{41}	—	December 9, 2001	Socorro	LINEAR	·	9.9 km	MPC · JPL
169407	2001 XC_{50}	—	December 10, 2001	Socorro	LINEAR	·	4.0 km	MPC · JPL
169408	2001 XP_{106}	—	December 10, 2001	Socorro	LINEAR	·	6.7 km	MPC · JPL
169409	2001 XL_{109}	—	December 11, 2001	Socorro	LINEAR	·	5.0 km	MPC · JPL
169410	2001 XD_{120}	—	December 14, 2001	Socorro	LINEAR	LUT	6.1 km	MPC · JPL
169411	2001 XS_{129}	—	December 14, 2001	Socorro	LINEAR	·	3.3 km	MPC · JPL
169412	2001 XH_{172}	—	December 14, 2001	Socorro	LINEAR	·	1.3 km	MPC · JPL
169413	2001 XU_{187}	—	December 14, 2001	Socorro	LINEAR	·	1.3 km	MPC · JPL
169414	2001 XW_{189}	—	December 14, 2001	Socorro	LINEAR	·	1.7 km	MPC · JPL
169415	2001 XM_{200}	—	December 15, 2001	Socorro	LINEAR	(45637) · CYB	6.4 km	MPC · JPL
169416	2001 XM_{201}	—	December 14, 2001	Bergisch Gladbach	W. Bickel	·	1.1 km	MPC · JPL
169417	2001 XZ_{207}	—	December 11, 2001	Socorro	LINEAR	·	4.6 km	MPC · JPL
169418	2001 XF_{208}	—	December 11, 2001	Socorro	LINEAR	T_{j} (2.96)	5.7 km	MPC · JPL
169419	2001 XV_{228}	—	December 15, 2001	Socorro	LINEAR	·	4.4 km	MPC · JPL
169420	2001 XR_{243}	—	December 14, 2001	Socorro	LINEAR	·	1.8 km	MPC · JPL
169421	2001 XZ_{251}	—	December 14, 2001	Socorro	LINEAR	THM	3.3 km	MPC · JPL
169422	2001 XV_{258}	—	December 8, 2001	Anderson Mesa	LONEOS	·	4.8 km	MPC · JPL
169423	2001 YV_{11}	—	December 18, 2001	Socorro	LINEAR	·	1.4 km	MPC · JPL
169424	2001 YB_{25}	—	December 18, 2001	Socorro	LINEAR	THM	6.1 km	MPC · JPL
169425	2001 YA_{54}	—	December 18, 2001	Socorro	LINEAR	·	920 m	MPC · JPL
169426	2001 YB_{73}	—	December 18, 2001	Socorro	LINEAR	·	1.5 km	MPC · JPL
169427	2001 YP_{103}	—	December 17, 2001	Socorro	LINEAR	·	1.5 km	MPC · JPL
169428	2001 YL_{127}	—	December 17, 2001	Socorro	LINEAR	·	5.4 km	MPC · JPL
169429	2001 YP_{149}	—	December 19, 2001	Palomar	NEAT	SYL · CYB	6.5 km	MPC · JPL
169430	2002 AH_{5}	—	January 9, 2002	Oizumi	T. Kobayashi	·	1.4 km	MPC · JPL
169431	2002 AK_{26}	—	January 11, 2002	Kitt Peak	Spacewatch	·	1.1 km	MPC · JPL
169432	2002 AM_{30}	—	January 9, 2002	Socorro	LINEAR	·	1.1 km	MPC · JPL
169433	2002 AY_{42}	—	January 9, 2002	Socorro	LINEAR	·	3.7 km	MPC · JPL
169434	2002 AE_{47}	—	January 9, 2002	Socorro	LINEAR	·	1.8 km	MPC · JPL
169435	2002 AF_{52}	—	January 9, 2002	Socorro	LINEAR	·	1.0 km	MPC · JPL
169436	2002 AM_{62}	—	January 11, 2002	Socorro	LINEAR	·	2.1 km	MPC · JPL
169437	2002 AR_{66}	—	January 12, 2002	Socorro	LINEAR	·	1.8 km	MPC · JPL
169438	2002 AA_{97}	—	January 8, 2002	Socorro	LINEAR	·	1.2 km	MPC · JPL
169439	2002 AP_{105}	—	January 9, 2002	Socorro	LINEAR	·	5.2 km	MPC · JPL
169440	2002 AZ_{127}	—	January 13, 2002	Socorro	LINEAR	·	1.0 km	MPC · JPL
169441	2002 AR_{131}	—	January 8, 2002	Socorro	LINEAR	·	6.4 km	MPC · JPL
169442	2002 AT_{152}	—	January 14, 2002	Socorro	LINEAR	·	1.2 km	MPC · JPL
169443	2002 AO_{156}	—	January 13, 2002	Socorro	LINEAR	·	2.8 km	MPC · JPL
169444	2002 AC_{157}	—	January 13, 2002	Socorro	LINEAR	·	2.2 km	MPC · JPL
169445	2002 AG_{173}	—	January 14, 2002	Socorro	LINEAR	·	2.6 km	MPC · JPL
169446	2002 AA_{193}	—	January 12, 2002	Palomar	NEAT	·	6.4 km	MPC · JPL
169447	2002 BW	—	January 21, 2002	Palomar	NEAT	·	1.4 km	MPC · JPL
169448	2002 BY_{11}	—	January 19, 2002	Socorro	LINEAR	·	1.2 km	MPC · JPL
169449	2002 BX_{15}	—	January 19, 2002	Socorro	LINEAR	·	1.2 km	MPC · JPL
169450	2002 BU_{16}	—	January 19, 2002	Socorro	LINEAR	·	1.3 km	MPC · JPL
169451	2002 BF_{22}	—	January 21, 2002	Socorro	LINEAR	·	1.4 km	MPC · JPL
169452	2002 CD_{6}	—	February 4, 2002	Haleakala	NEAT	·	1.3 km	MPC · JPL
169453	2002 CY_{7}	—	February 4, 2002	Palomar	NEAT	·	1.5 km	MPC · JPL
169454	2002 CY_{10}	—	February 6, 2002	Socorro	LINEAR	PHO	2.4 km	MPC · JPL
169455	2002 CB_{14}	—	February 8, 2002	Desert Eagle	W. K. Y. Yeung	·	1.3 km	MPC · JPL
169456	2002 CZ_{21}	—	February 5, 2002	Palomar	NEAT	3:2	6.3 km	MPC · JPL
169457	2002 CN_{33}	—	February 6, 2002	Socorro	LINEAR	·	1.1 km	MPC · JPL
169458	2002 CU_{36}	—	February 7, 2002	Socorro	LINEAR	·	1.0 km	MPC · JPL
169459	2002 CP_{43}	—	February 7, 2002	Socorro	LINEAR	·	1.3 km	MPC · JPL
169460	2002 CD_{48}	—	February 3, 2002	Haleakala	NEAT	·	1.2 km	MPC · JPL
169461	2002 CX_{57}	—	February 8, 2002	Socorro	LINEAR	·	1.7 km	MPC · JPL
169462	2002 CN_{59}	—	February 12, 2002	Desert Eagle	W. K. Y. Yeung	·	2.0 km	MPC · JPL
169463	2002 CZ_{60}	—	February 6, 2002	Socorro	LINEAR	·	1.4 km	MPC · JPL
169464	2002 CK_{66}	—	February 7, 2002	Socorro	LINEAR	·	2.1 km	MPC · JPL
169465	2002 CB_{69}	—	February 7, 2002	Socorro	LINEAR	·	900 m	MPC · JPL
169466	2002 CE_{70}	—	February 7, 2002	Socorro	LINEAR	·	1.7 km	MPC · JPL
169467	2002 CT_{73}	—	February 7, 2002	Socorro	LINEAR	V	1.0 km	MPC · JPL
169468	2002 CD_{83}	—	February 7, 2002	Socorro	LINEAR	V	1.2 km	MPC · JPL
169469	2002 CM_{84}	—	February 7, 2002	Socorro	LINEAR	·	1.2 km	MPC · JPL
169470	2002 CJ_{91}	—	February 7, 2002	Socorro	LINEAR	·	1.1 km	MPC · JPL
169471	2002 CS_{94}	—	February 7, 2002	Socorro	LINEAR	·	1.8 km	MPC · JPL
169472	2002 CN_{98}	—	February 7, 2002	Socorro	LINEAR	·	2.0 km	MPC · JPL
169473	2002 CH_{101}	—	February 7, 2002	Socorro	LINEAR	·	1.3 km	MPC · JPL
169474	2002 CK_{107}	—	February 7, 2002	Socorro	LINEAR	·	1.2 km	MPC · JPL
169475	2002 CZ_{114}	—	February 8, 2002	Socorro	LINEAR	·	1.5 km	MPC · JPL
169476	2002 CC_{115}	—	February 9, 2002	Socorro	LINEAR	·	1.4 km	MPC · JPL
169477	2002 CM_{121}	—	February 7, 2002	Socorro	LINEAR	T_{j} (2.98)	8.1 km	MPC · JPL
169478	2002 CS_{128}	—	February 7, 2002	Socorro	LINEAR	·	1.0 km	MPC · JPL
169479	2002 CB_{134}	—	February 7, 2002	Socorro	LINEAR	·	1.1 km	MPC · JPL
169480	2002 CX_{137}	—	February 8, 2002	Socorro	LINEAR	·	1.4 km	MPC · JPL
169481	2002 CC_{138}	—	February 8, 2002	Socorro	LINEAR	V	1.3 km	MPC · JPL
169482	2002 CL_{144}	—	February 9, 2002	Socorro	LINEAR	·	1.2 km	MPC · JPL
169483	2002 CL_{146}	—	February 9, 2002	Socorro	LINEAR	·	1.2 km	MPC · JPL
169484	2002 CL_{148}	—	February 10, 2002	Socorro	LINEAR	·	1.6 km	MPC · JPL
169485	2002 CS_{159}	—	February 7, 2002	Socorro	LINEAR	·	1.1 km	MPC · JPL
169486	2002 CU_{167}	—	February 8, 2002	Socorro	LINEAR	·	1.4 km	MPC · JPL
169487	2002 CH_{168}	—	February 8, 2002	Socorro	LINEAR	·	1.2 km	MPC · JPL
169488	2002 CS_{168}	—	February 8, 2002	Socorro	LINEAR	·	1.4 km	MPC · JPL
169489	2002 CJ_{169}	—	February 8, 2002	Socorro	LINEAR	·	4.3 km	MPC · JPL
169490	2002 CT_{179}	—	February 10, 2002	Socorro	LINEAR	·	1.1 km	MPC · JPL
169491	2002 CV_{190}	—	February 10, 2002	Socorro	LINEAR	·	1.2 km	MPC · JPL
169492	2002 CV_{192}	—	February 10, 2002	Socorro	LINEAR	·	1.2 km	MPC · JPL
169493	2002 CU_{197}	—	February 10, 2002	Socorro	LINEAR	·	1.1 km	MPC · JPL
169494	2002 CQ_{209}	—	February 10, 2002	Socorro	LINEAR	V	990 m	MPC · JPL
169495	2002 CS_{212}	—	February 10, 2002	Socorro	LINEAR	·	1.9 km	MPC · JPL
169496	2002 CX_{214}	—	February 10, 2002	Socorro	LINEAR	·	2.9 km	MPC · JPL
169497	2002 CM_{215}	—	February 10, 2002	Socorro	LINEAR	·	1.2 km	MPC · JPL
169498	2002 CC_{216}	—	February 10, 2002	Socorro	LINEAR	MAS	950 m	MPC · JPL
169499	2002 CP_{216}	—	February 10, 2002	Socorro	LINEAR	·	1.5 km	MPC · JPL
169500	2002 CD_{217}	—	February 10, 2002	Socorro	LINEAR	·	1.4 km	MPC · JPL

== 169501–169600 ==
back to top

Designation			Discovery			Properties		Ref
Permanent	Provisional	Named after	Date	Site	Discoverer(s)	Category	Diam.	Ref
169501	2002 CR_{218}	—	February 10, 2002	Socorro	LINEAR	·	1.9 km	MPC · JPL
169502	2002 CS_{222}	—	February 11, 2002	Socorro	LINEAR	·	1.1 km	MPC · JPL
169503	2002 CA_{238}	—	February 11, 2002	Socorro	LINEAR	·	1.4 km	MPC · JPL
169504	2002 CZ_{241}	—	February 11, 2002	Socorro	LINEAR	·	1.8 km	MPC · JPL
169505	2002 CS_{243}	—	February 11, 2002	Socorro	LINEAR	·	2.0 km	MPC · JPL
169506	2002 CE_{245}	—	February 13, 2002	Socorro	LINEAR	·	1.4 km	MPC · JPL
169507	2002 CX_{252}	—	February 5, 2002	Anderson Mesa	LONEOS	(1338) (FLO)	970 m	MPC · JPL
169508	2002 CT_{267}	—	February 7, 2002	Palomar	NEAT	3:2	6.9 km	MPC · JPL
169509 Jeffreyrobbins	2002 CV_{269}	Jeffreyrobbins	February 7, 2002	Kitt Peak	M. W. Buie	3:2 · SHU	10 km	MPC · JPL
169510	2002 CQ_{276}	—	February 7, 2002	Palomar	NEAT	NYS	2.2 km	MPC · JPL
169511	2002 CX_{298}	—	February 11, 2002	Socorro	LINEAR	·	1.0 km	MPC · JPL
169512	2002 CD_{302}	—	February 12, 2002	Socorro	LINEAR	·	1.5 km	MPC · JPL
169513	2002 DN_{15}	—	February 16, 2002	Palomar	NEAT	·	1.4 km	MPC · JPL
169514	2002 DT_{18}	—	February 24, 2002	Haleakala	NEAT	·	2.3 km	MPC · JPL
169515	2002 EN	—	March 5, 2002	Desert Eagle	W. K. Y. Yeung	·	1.8 km	MPC · JPL
169516	2002 EQ	—	March 5, 2002	Desert Eagle	W. K. Y. Yeung	·	2.1 km	MPC · JPL
169517	2002 EW_{2}	—	March 10, 2002	Fountain Hills	C. W. Juels, P. R. Holvorcem	·	3.5 km	MPC · JPL
169518	2002 EH_{12}	—	March 14, 2002	Desert Eagle	W. K. Y. Yeung	·	1.3 km	MPC · JPL
169519	2002 EK_{16}	—	March 6, 2002	Palomar	NEAT	·	1.6 km	MPC · JPL
169520	2002 EQ_{21}	—	March 10, 2002	Haleakala	NEAT	·	1.2 km	MPC · JPL
169521	2002 EA_{33}	—	March 11, 2002	Palomar	NEAT	·	2.4 km	MPC · JPL
169522	2002 EF_{40}	—	March 9, 2002	Socorro	LINEAR	·	1.8 km	MPC · JPL
169523	2002 EW_{41}	—	March 12, 2002	Socorro	LINEAR	·	1.7 km	MPC · JPL
169524	2002 EW_{42}	—	March 12, 2002	Socorro	LINEAR	·	2.1 km	MPC · JPL
169525	2002 EF_{48}	—	March 12, 2002	Palomar	NEAT	NYS	1.5 km	MPC · JPL
169526	2002 ET_{50}	—	March 12, 2002	Palomar	NEAT	MAS	1.1 km	MPC · JPL
169527	2002 EY_{51}	—	March 9, 2002	Socorro	LINEAR	·	1.1 km	MPC · JPL
169528	2002 EF_{63}	—	March 13, 2002	Socorro	LINEAR	MAS	1.2 km	MPC · JPL
169529	2002 EA_{65}	—	March 13, 2002	Socorro	LINEAR	·	1.9 km	MPC · JPL
169530	2002 EZ_{65}	—	March 13, 2002	Socorro	LINEAR	·	1.0 km	MPC · JPL
169531	2002 EK_{66}	—	March 13, 2002	Socorro	LINEAR	NYS	1.3 km	MPC · JPL
169532	2002 EO_{67}	—	March 13, 2002	Socorro	LINEAR	·	1.8 km	MPC · JPL
169533	2002 EW_{67}	—	March 13, 2002	Socorro	LINEAR	·	1.8 km	MPC · JPL
169534	2002 ED_{69}	—	March 13, 2002	Socorro	LINEAR	·	1.5 km	MPC · JPL
169535	2002 EE_{69}	—	March 13, 2002	Socorro	LINEAR	NYS	1.4 km	MPC · JPL
169536	2002 EU_{70}	—	March 13, 2002	Socorro	LINEAR	·	1.4 km	MPC · JPL
169537	2002 EH_{73}	—	March 13, 2002	Socorro	LINEAR	·	2.1 km	MPC · JPL
169538	2002 EH_{74}	—	March 13, 2002	Socorro	LINEAR	NYS ·	2.4 km	MPC · JPL
169539	2002 EV_{80}	—	March 13, 2002	Palomar	NEAT	·	1.2 km	MPC · JPL
169540	2002 EK_{81}	—	March 13, 2002	Palomar	NEAT	NYS	2.2 km	MPC · JPL
169541	2002 EX_{83}	—	March 9, 2002	Socorro	LINEAR	NYS	1.5 km	MPC · JPL
169542	2002 EJ_{87}	—	March 9, 2002	Socorro	LINEAR	·	1.4 km	MPC · JPL
169543	2002 EY_{87}	—	March 9, 2002	Socorro	LINEAR	·	970 m	MPC · JPL
169544	2002 EZ_{87}	—	March 9, 2002	Socorro	LINEAR	·	1.8 km	MPC · JPL
169545	2002 EM_{89}	—	March 12, 2002	Socorro	LINEAR	·	1.9 km	MPC · JPL
169546	2002 EV_{91}	—	March 12, 2002	Socorro	LINEAR	·	1.5 km	MPC · JPL
169547	2002 EO_{94}	—	March 14, 2002	Socorro	LINEAR	·	1.6 km	MPC · JPL
169548	2002 EQ_{97}	—	March 12, 2002	Socorro	LINEAR	·	1.4 km	MPC · JPL
169549	2002 EG_{105}	—	March 9, 2002	Anderson Mesa	LONEOS	·	1.3 km	MPC · JPL
169550	2002 EF_{106}	—	March 9, 2002	Anderson Mesa	LONEOS	·	1.4 km	MPC · JPL
169551	2002 EB_{108}	—	March 9, 2002	Kitt Peak	Spacewatch	·	1.0 km	MPC · JPL
169552	2002 EP_{109}	—	March 9, 2002	Kitt Peak	Spacewatch	·	1.5 km	MPC · JPL
169553	2002 EY_{110}	—	March 9, 2002	Anderson Mesa	LONEOS	·	1.1 km	MPC · JPL
169554	2002 EB_{115}	—	March 10, 2002	Anderson Mesa	LONEOS	·	1.8 km	MPC · JPL
169555	2002 ES_{115}	—	March 10, 2002	Haleakala	NEAT	V	990 m	MPC · JPL
169556	2002 EN_{116}	—	March 9, 2002	Kitt Peak	Spacewatch	NYS	1.5 km	MPC · JPL
169557	2002 ES_{132}	—	March 13, 2002	Palomar	NEAT	·	1.1 km	MPC · JPL
169558	2002 EM_{137}	—	March 12, 2002	Palomar	NEAT	·	1.4 km	MPC · JPL
169559	2002 EP_{139}	—	March 12, 2002	Palomar	NEAT	NYS	1.4 km	MPC · JPL
169560	2002 ES_{139}	—	March 12, 2002	Kitt Peak	Spacewatch	·	1.3 km	MPC · JPL
169561	2002 EY_{139}	—	March 12, 2002	Palomar	NEAT	MAS	1.0 km	MPC · JPL
169562	2002 ET_{145}	—	March 13, 2002	Palomar	NEAT	·	1.1 km	MPC · JPL
169563	2002 EM_{155}	—	March 5, 2002	Anderson Mesa	LONEOS	·	1.2 km	MPC · JPL
169564	2002 EO_{155}	—	March 5, 2002	Anderson Mesa	LONEOS	·	1.6 km	MPC · JPL
169565	2002 EP_{155}	—	March 5, 2002	Anderson Mesa	LONEOS	·	1.4 km	MPC · JPL
169566	2002 FG_{4}	—	March 20, 2002	Desert Eagle	W. K. Y. Yeung	·	2.1 km	MPC · JPL
169567	2002 FO_{4}	—	March 20, 2002	Desert Eagle	W. K. Y. Yeung	·	1.6 km	MPC · JPL
169568 Baranauskas	2002 FN_{6}	Baranauskas	March 16, 2002	Moletai	K. Černis, Zdanavicius, J.	NYS	3.9 km	MPC · JPL
169569	2002 FD_{9}	—	March 16, 2002	Socorro	LINEAR	·	1.0 km	MPC · JPL
169570	2002 FS_{9}	—	March 16, 2002	Socorro	LINEAR	·	1.9 km	MPC · JPL
169571	2002 FW_{11}	—	March 17, 2002	Haleakala	NEAT	·	1.3 km	MPC · JPL
169572	2002 FE_{13}	—	March 16, 2002	Socorro	LINEAR	NYS	2.0 km	MPC · JPL
169573	2002 FQ_{21}	—	March 19, 2002	Anderson Mesa	LONEOS	V	940 m	MPC · JPL
169574	2002 FZ_{24}	—	March 19, 2002	Anderson Mesa	LONEOS	·	1.1 km	MPC · JPL
169575	2002 GQ_{7}	—	April 14, 2002	Desert Eagle	W. K. Y. Yeung	·	1.3 km	MPC · JPL
169576	2002 GB_{8}	—	April 14, 2002	Desert Eagle	W. K. Y. Yeung	·	2.2 km	MPC · JPL
169577	2002 GO_{14}	—	April 15, 2002	Socorro	LINEAR	·	2.4 km	MPC · JPL
169578	2002 GA_{15}	—	April 15, 2002	Socorro	LINEAR	·	1.4 km	MPC · JPL
169579	2002 GZ_{18}	—	April 14, 2002	Socorro	LINEAR	NYS	1.8 km	MPC · JPL
169580	2002 GT_{20}	—	April 14, 2002	Socorro	LINEAR	NYS	2.2 km	MPC · JPL
169581	2002 GW_{20}	—	April 14, 2002	Socorro	LINEAR	V	1.1 km	MPC · JPL
169582	2002 GB_{22}	—	April 14, 2002	Haleakala	NEAT	·	1.7 km	MPC · JPL
169583	2002 GE_{27}	—	April 15, 2002	Kitt Peak	Spacewatch	·	1.4 km	MPC · JPL
169584	2002 GL_{33}	—	April 1, 2002	Palomar	NEAT	·	1.2 km	MPC · JPL
169585	2002 GE_{35}	—	April 1, 2002	Palomar	NEAT	·	1.3 km	MPC · JPL
169586	2002 GW_{40}	—	April 4, 2002	Palomar	NEAT	·	1.7 km	MPC · JPL
169587	2002 GT_{48}	—	April 4, 2002	Palomar	NEAT	·	2.0 km	MPC · JPL
169588	2002 GO_{56}	—	April 5, 2002	Palomar	NEAT	V	1.4 km	MPC · JPL
169589	2002 GZ_{62}	—	April 8, 2002	Palomar	NEAT	NYS	1.9 km	MPC · JPL
169590	2002 GJ_{68}	—	April 8, 2002	Socorro	LINEAR	·	4.8 km	MPC · JPL
169591	2002 GP_{68}	—	April 8, 2002	Socorro	LINEAR	·	2.1 km	MPC · JPL
169592	2002 GV_{69}	—	April 8, 2002	Palomar	NEAT	·	2.6 km	MPC · JPL
169593	2002 GT_{71}	—	April 9, 2002	Anderson Mesa	LONEOS	·	1.8 km	MPC · JPL
169594	2002 GM_{72}	—	April 9, 2002	Anderson Mesa	LONEOS	·	1.1 km	MPC · JPL
169595	2002 GU_{72}	—	April 9, 2002	Anderson Mesa	LONEOS	V	1.3 km	MPC · JPL
169596	2002 GY_{74}	—	April 9, 2002	Kitt Peak	Spacewatch	·	1.5 km	MPC · JPL
169597	2002 GZ_{77}	—	April 9, 2002	Socorro	LINEAR	NYS	1.6 km	MPC · JPL
169598	2002 GK_{79}	—	April 10, 2002	Socorro	LINEAR	·	1.1 km	MPC · JPL
169599	2002 GD_{81}	—	April 10, 2002	Socorro	LINEAR	·	1.7 km	MPC · JPL
169600	2002 GE_{81}	—	April 10, 2002	Socorro	LINEAR	·	3.0 km	MPC · JPL

== 169601–169700 ==
back to top

Designation			Discovery			Properties		Ref
Permanent	Provisional	Named after	Date	Site	Discoverer(s)	Category	Diam.	Ref
169601	2002 GA_{84}	—	April 10, 2002	Socorro	LINEAR	·	1.7 km	MPC · JPL
169602	2002 GF_{84}	—	April 10, 2002	Socorro	LINEAR	·	1.8 km	MPC · JPL
169603	2002 GP_{84}	—	April 10, 2002	Socorro	LINEAR	·	2.0 km	MPC · JPL
169604	2002 GQ_{85}	—	April 10, 2002	Socorro	LINEAR	·	1.8 km	MPC · JPL
169605	2002 GT_{92}	—	April 9, 2002	Socorro	LINEAR	NYS	2.2 km	MPC · JPL
169606	2002 GF_{95}	—	April 9, 2002	Socorro	LINEAR	·	1.3 km	MPC · JPL
169607	2002 GM_{101}	—	April 10, 2002	Socorro	LINEAR	·	2.8 km	MPC · JPL
169608	2002 GA_{102}	—	April 10, 2002	Socorro	LINEAR	·	1.5 km	MPC · JPL
169609	2002 GD_{103}	—	April 10, 2002	Socorro	LINEAR	V	1.0 km	MPC · JPL
169610	2002 GH_{108}	—	April 11, 2002	Socorro	LINEAR	V	1.1 km	MPC · JPL
169611	2002 GN_{112}	—	April 10, 2002	Socorro	LINEAR	BAP	1.7 km	MPC · JPL
169612	2002 GM_{113}	—	April 11, 2002	Socorro	LINEAR	·	2.2 km	MPC · JPL
169613	2002 GY_{113}	—	April 11, 2002	Socorro	LINEAR	·	1.5 km	MPC · JPL
169614	2002 GK_{115}	—	April 11, 2002	Socorro	LINEAR	·	1.6 km	MPC · JPL
169615	2002 GK_{121}	—	April 12, 2002	Haleakala	NEAT	·	3.3 km	MPC · JPL
169616	2002 GN_{121}	—	April 10, 2002	Socorro	LINEAR	·	1.6 km	MPC · JPL
169617	2002 GC_{128}	—	April 12, 2002	Socorro	LINEAR	V	1.1 km	MPC · JPL
169618	2002 GB_{130}	—	April 12, 2002	Socorro	LINEAR	·	2.2 km	MPC · JPL
169619	2002 GS_{136}	—	April 12, 2002	Socorro	LINEAR	·	2.2 km	MPC · JPL
169620	2002 GE_{144}	—	April 11, 2002	Socorro	LINEAR	·	1.6 km	MPC · JPL
169621	2002 GA_{148}	—	April 13, 2002	Palomar	NEAT	·	2.8 km	MPC · JPL
169622	2002 GZ_{150}	—	April 14, 2002	Socorro	LINEAR	·	2.2 km	MPC · JPL
169623	2002 GB_{164}	—	April 14, 2002	Palomar	NEAT	·	2.5 km	MPC · JPL
169624	2002 GF_{165}	—	April 14, 2002	Palomar	NEAT	·	1.5 km	MPC · JPL
169625	2002 GY_{167}	—	April 9, 2002	Socorro	LINEAR	·	1.1 km	MPC · JPL
169626	2002 GL_{169}	—	April 9, 2002	Socorro	LINEAR	·	1.1 km	MPC · JPL
169627	2002 GY_{169}	—	April 9, 2002	Socorro	LINEAR	·	1.1 km	MPC · JPL
169628	2002 GE_{171}	—	April 10, 2002	Socorro	LINEAR	·	3.1 km	MPC · JPL
169629	2002 GZ_{171}	—	April 10, 2002	Socorro	LINEAR	NYS ·	1.9 km	MPC · JPL
169630	2002 GK_{181}	—	April 13, 2002	Palomar	NEAT	(5)	2.8 km	MPC · JPL
169631	2002 HJ_{1}	—	April 16, 2002	Socorro	LINEAR	·	2.9 km	MPC · JPL
169632	2002 HG_{6}	—	April 19, 2002	Reedy Creek	J. Broughton	·	1.9 km	MPC · JPL
169633	2002 HQ_{12}	—	April 21, 2002	Palomar	NEAT	PHO	1.6 km	MPC · JPL
169634	2002 JW_{12}	—	May 8, 2002	Desert Eagle	W. K. Y. Yeung	PHO	1.7 km	MPC · JPL
169635	2002 JZ_{13}	—	May 8, 2002	Socorro	LINEAR	PHO	2.2 km	MPC · JPL
169636	2002 JT_{15}	—	May 8, 2002	Socorro	LINEAR	·	2.0 km	MPC · JPL
169637	2002 JY_{20}	—	May 8, 2002	Haleakala	NEAT	·	2.5 km	MPC · JPL
169638	2002 JJ_{21}	—	May 8, 2002	Haleakala	NEAT	·	1.6 km	MPC · JPL
169639	2002 JF_{22}	—	May 8, 2002	Socorro	LINEAR	NYS	2.0 km	MPC · JPL
169640	2002 JD_{23}	—	May 8, 2002	Socorro	LINEAR	NYS ·	2.3 km	MPC · JPL
169641	2002 JJ_{24}	—	May 8, 2002	Socorro	LINEAR	V	1.9 km	MPC · JPL
169642	2002 JG_{27}	—	May 8, 2002	Socorro	LINEAR	·	2.0 km	MPC · JPL
169643	2002 JN_{27}	—	May 8, 2002	Socorro	LINEAR	·	1.7 km	MPC · JPL
169644	2002 JH_{29}	—	May 9, 2002	Socorro	LINEAR	(883)	1.0 km	MPC · JPL
169645	2002 JP_{29}	—	May 9, 2002	Socorro	LINEAR	·	1.9 km	MPC · JPL
169646	2002 JJ_{32}	—	May 9, 2002	Socorro	LINEAR	·	2.4 km	MPC · JPL
169647	2002 JV_{36}	—	May 7, 2002	Anderson Mesa	LONEOS	·	2.5 km	MPC · JPL
169648	2002 JN_{37}	—	May 8, 2002	Haleakala	NEAT	V	1.2 km	MPC · JPL
169649	2002 JE_{42}	—	May 8, 2002	Socorro	LINEAR	·	2.3 km	MPC · JPL
169650	2002 JC_{47}	—	May 9, 2002	Socorro	LINEAR	·	2.1 km	MPC · JPL
169651	2002 JR_{48}	—	May 9, 2002	Socorro	LINEAR	·	2.4 km	MPC · JPL
169652	2002 JU_{48}	—	May 9, 2002	Socorro	LINEAR	·	2.1 km	MPC · JPL
169653	2002 JC_{49}	—	May 9, 2002	Socorro	LINEAR	·	2.9 km	MPC · JPL
169654	2002 JU_{50}	—	May 9, 2002	Socorro	LINEAR	·	2.0 km	MPC · JPL
169655	2002 JP_{51}	—	May 9, 2002	Socorro	LINEAR	·	1.4 km	MPC · JPL
169656	2002 JZ_{52}	—	May 9, 2002	Socorro	LINEAR	(2076)	1.3 km	MPC · JPL
169657	2002 JY_{63}	—	May 9, 2002	Socorro	LINEAR	NYS	1.9 km	MPC · JPL
169658	2002 JT_{65}	—	May 9, 2002	Socorro	LINEAR	·	1.8 km	MPC · JPL
169659	2002 JE_{66}	—	May 9, 2002	Socorro	LINEAR	·	2.2 km	MPC · JPL
169660	2002 JG_{66}	—	May 9, 2002	Socorro	LINEAR	·	1.3 km	MPC · JPL
169661	2002 JF_{67}	—	May 10, 2002	Socorro	LINEAR	·	1.4 km	MPC · JPL
169662	2002 JS_{69}	—	May 7, 2002	Socorro	LINEAR	V	1.4 km	MPC · JPL
169663	2002 JJ_{70}	—	May 7, 2002	Socorro	LINEAR	·	3.1 km	MPC · JPL
169664	2002 JP_{70}	—	May 8, 2002	Socorro	LINEAR	·	1.1 km	MPC · JPL
169665	2002 JM_{74}	—	May 9, 2002	Socorro	LINEAR	·	1.6 km	MPC · JPL
169666	2002 JR_{76}	—	May 11, 2002	Socorro	LINEAR	·	980 m	MPC · JPL
169667	2002 JL_{80}	—	May 11, 2002	Socorro	LINEAR	·	2.3 km	MPC · JPL
169668	2002 JD_{84}	—	May 11, 2002	Socorro	LINEAR	·	870 m	MPC · JPL
169669	2002 JK_{86}	—	May 11, 2002	Socorro	LINEAR	·	2.8 km	MPC · JPL
169670	2002 JT_{87}	—	May 11, 2002	Socorro	LINEAR	·	1.8 km	MPC · JPL
169671	2002 JX_{87}	—	May 11, 2002	Socorro	LINEAR	(2076)	1.2 km	MPC · JPL
169672	2002 JX_{88}	—	May 11, 2002	Socorro	LINEAR	·	2.3 km	MPC · JPL
169673	2002 JS_{91}	—	May 11, 2002	Socorro	LINEAR	·	2.4 km	MPC · JPL
169674	2002 JL_{93}	—	May 11, 2002	Socorro	LINEAR	·	1.5 km	MPC · JPL
169675	2002 JM_{97}	—	May 9, 2002	Socorro	LINEAR	AMO +1km	1.6 km	MPC · JPL
169676	2002 JS_{97}	—	May 7, 2002	Socorro	LINEAR	·	2.2 km	MPC · JPL
169677	2002 JK_{98}	—	May 10, 2002	Socorro	LINEAR	·	1.9 km	MPC · JPL
169678	2002 JA_{102}	—	May 9, 2002	Socorro	LINEAR	PHO	3.3 km	MPC · JPL
169679	2002 JB_{104}	—	May 10, 2002	Socorro	LINEAR	·	2.3 km	MPC · JPL
169680	2002 JF_{110}	—	May 11, 2002	Socorro	LINEAR	·	990 m	MPC · JPL
169681	2002 JM_{112}	—	May 11, 2002	Socorro	LINEAR	NYS	1.5 km	MPC · JPL
169682	2002 JX_{113}	—	May 15, 2002	Palomar	NEAT	·	1.1 km	MPC · JPL
169683	2002 JD_{114}	—	May 10, 2002	Palomar	NEAT	V	970 m	MPC · JPL
169684	2002 JM_{125}	—	May 7, 2002	Palomar	NEAT	·	1.8 km	MPC · JPL
169685	2002 JZ_{125}	—	May 7, 2002	Palomar	NEAT	·	1.5 km	MPC · JPL
169686	2002 JF_{132}	—	May 9, 2002	Socorro	LINEAR	·	2.3 km	MPC · JPL
169687	2002 JT_{133}	—	May 9, 2002	Socorro	LINEAR	·	2.5 km	MPC · JPL
169688	2002 JX_{138}	—	May 9, 2002	Palomar	NEAT	·	2.7 km	MPC · JPL
169689	2002 JA_{141}	—	May 10, 2002	Palomar	NEAT	V	1.1 km	MPC · JPL
169690	2002 JK_{149}	—	May 7, 2002	Socorro	LINEAR	MAR	1.3 km	MPC · JPL
169691	2002 KL_{1}	—	May 16, 2002	Haleakala	NEAT	·	1.9 km	MPC · JPL
169692	2002 LC_{1}	—	June 2, 2002	Palomar	NEAT	·	2.4 km	MPC · JPL
169693	2002 LS_{4}	—	June 5, 2002	Socorro	LINEAR	·	2.9 km	MPC · JPL
169694	2002 LC_{5}	—	June 4, 2002	Palomar	NEAT	·	2.0 km	MPC · JPL
169695	2002 LK_{7}	—	June 2, 2002	Palomar	NEAT	·	2.1 km	MPC · JPL
169696	2002 LZ_{10}	—	June 5, 2002	Socorro	LINEAR	·	5.1 km	MPC · JPL
169697	2002 LZ_{12}	—	June 5, 2002	Socorro	LINEAR	·	2.0 km	MPC · JPL
169698	2002 LR_{17}	—	June 6, 2002	Socorro	LINEAR	·	1.8 km	MPC · JPL
169699	2002 LM_{18}	—	June 6, 2002	Socorro	LINEAR	·	2.5 km	MPC · JPL
169700	2002 LK_{27}	—	June 8, 2002	Socorro	LINEAR	JUN	2.4 km	MPC · JPL

== 169701–169800 ==
back to top

Designation			Discovery			Properties		Ref
Permanent	Provisional	Named after	Date	Site	Discoverer(s)	Category	Diam.	Ref
169701	2002 LZ_{27}	—	June 9, 2002	Socorro	LINEAR	·	2.3 km	MPC · JPL
169702	2002 LP_{28}	—	June 9, 2002	Socorro	LINEAR	·	3.4 km	MPC · JPL
169703	2002 LR_{34}	—	June 8, 2002	Socorro	LINEAR	·	2.3 km	MPC · JPL
169704	2002 LE_{36}	—	June 9, 2002	Socorro	LINEAR	·	4.3 km	MPC · JPL
169705	2002 LV_{36}	—	June 9, 2002	Socorro	LINEAR	·	1.7 km	MPC · JPL
169706	2002 LP_{38}	—	June 6, 2002	Socorro	LINEAR	·	2.7 km	MPC · JPL
169707	2002 LL_{39}	—	June 10, 2002	Socorro	LINEAR	·	2.3 km	MPC · JPL
169708	2002 LE_{40}	—	June 10, 2002	Socorro	LINEAR	·	1.9 km	MPC · JPL
169709	2002 LW_{42}	—	June 10, 2002	Socorro	LINEAR	·	4.3 km	MPC · JPL
169710	2002 LA_{44}	—	June 10, 2002	Socorro	LINEAR	·	3.3 km	MPC · JPL
169711	2002 LD_{45}	—	June 5, 2002	Palomar	NEAT	·	1.6 km	MPC · JPL
169712	2002 LX_{46}	—	June 12, 2002	Socorro	LINEAR	EUN	2.0 km	MPC · JPL
169713	2002 LQ_{50}	—	June 7, 2002	Kitt Peak	Spacewatch	MAR	1.9 km	MPC · JPL
169714	2002 LB_{52}	—	June 9, 2002	Socorro	LINEAR	·	2.4 km	MPC · JPL
169715	2002 LR_{53}	—	June 9, 2002	Haleakala	NEAT	·	2.6 km	MPC · JPL
169716	2002 LF_{62}	—	June 5, 2002	Palomar	NEAT	NYS	2.0 km	MPC · JPL
169717	2002 MF	—	June 17, 2002	Kitt Peak	Spacewatch	EUN	1.9 km	MPC · JPL
169718	2002 MJ	—	June 17, 2002	Campo Imperatore	CINEOS	·	2.1 km	MPC · JPL
169719	2002 MU_{1}	—	June 16, 2002	Palomar	NEAT	·	1.5 km	MPC · JPL
169720	2002 NQ_{8}	—	July 1, 2002	Palomar	NEAT	·	2.2 km	MPC · JPL
169721	2002 NL_{10}	—	July 4, 2002	Palomar	NEAT	·	3.3 km	MPC · JPL
169722	2002 NZ_{12}	—	July 4, 2002	Palomar	NEAT	·	2.3 km	MPC · JPL
169723	2002 NG_{15}	—	July 5, 2002	Socorro	LINEAR	·	2.7 km	MPC · JPL
169724	2002 NJ_{28}	—	July 12, 2002	Palomar	NEAT	·	2.1 km	MPC · JPL
169725	2002 NB_{29}	—	July 13, 2002	Haleakala	NEAT	·	3.0 km	MPC · JPL
169726	2002 NE_{32}	—	July 13, 2002	Socorro	LINEAR	·	2.2 km	MPC · JPL
169727	2002 NM_{34}	—	July 9, 2002	Socorro	LINEAR	RAF	1.6 km	MPC · JPL
169728	2002 NH_{36}	—	July 9, 2002	Socorro	LINEAR	·	1.6 km	MPC · JPL
169729	2002 NQ_{37}	—	July 9, 2002	Socorro	LINEAR	·	3.0 km	MPC · JPL
169730	2002 NW_{46}	—	July 11, 2002	Bergisch Gladbach	W. Bickel	fast	3.8 km	MPC · JPL
169731	2002 NQ_{47}	—	July 14, 2002	Socorro	LINEAR	·	3.2 km	MPC · JPL
169732	2002 NW_{47}	—	July 14, 2002	Socorro	LINEAR	·	2.2 km	MPC · JPL
169733	2002 NF_{52}	—	July 14, 2002	Palomar	NEAT	·	2.2 km	MPC · JPL
169734	2002 NF_{56}	—	July 3, 2002	Palomar	NEAT	·	2.9 km	MPC · JPL
169735	2002 NJ_{58}	—	July 10, 2002	Palomar	NEAT	·	3.1 km	MPC · JPL
169736	2002 NB_{61}	—	July 14, 2002	Palomar	NEAT	·	1.7 km	MPC · JPL
169737	2002 OM_{1}	—	July 17, 2002	Socorro	LINEAR	·	2.3 km	MPC · JPL
169738	2002 ON_{1}	—	July 17, 2002	Socorro	LINEAR	·	6.3 km	MPC · JPL
169739	2002 ON_{2}	—	July 17, 2002	Socorro	LINEAR	ADE	4.7 km	MPC · JPL
169740	2002 OC_{5}	—	July 16, 2002	Bergisch Gladbach	W. Bickel	HNS	2.1 km	MPC · JPL
169741	2002 OK_{6}	—	July 20, 2002	Palomar	NEAT	DOR	4.1 km	MPC · JPL
169742	2002 OZ_{11}	—	July 18, 2002	Socorro	LINEAR	·	2.7 km	MPC · JPL
169743	2002 OK_{13}	—	July 18, 2002	Socorro	LINEAR	ADE	4.2 km	MPC · JPL
169744	2002 OF_{18}	—	July 18, 2002	Socorro	LINEAR	·	1.9 km	MPC · JPL
169745	2002 OT_{18}	—	July 18, 2002	Socorro	LINEAR	·	3.4 km	MPC · JPL
169746	2002 OQ_{19}	—	July 21, 2002	Palomar	NEAT	·	3.4 km	MPC · JPL
169747	2002 OY_{24}	—	July 23, 2002	Palomar	S. F. Hönig	·	3.3 km	MPC · JPL
169748	2002 OL_{25}	—	July 30, 2002	Haleakala	Lowe, A.	(5)	1.6 km	MPC · JPL
169749	2002 PA_{3}	—	August 3, 2002	Palomar	NEAT	EUN	1.8 km	MPC · JPL
169750	2002 PD_{5}	—	August 4, 2002	Palomar	NEAT	·	3.1 km	MPC · JPL
169751	2002 PO_{5}	—	August 4, 2002	Palomar	NEAT	·	3.9 km	MPC · JPL
169752	2002 PX_{19}	—	August 6, 2002	Palomar	NEAT	(5)	1.4 km	MPC · JPL
169753	2002 PY_{23}	—	August 6, 2002	Palomar	NEAT	·	2.8 km	MPC · JPL
169754	2002 PE_{25}	—	August 6, 2002	Palomar	NEAT	·	2.0 km	MPC · JPL
169755	2002 PW_{27}	—	August 6, 2002	Palomar	NEAT	·	1.7 km	MPC · JPL
169756	2002 PE_{30}	—	August 6, 2002	Palomar	NEAT	·	3.4 km	MPC · JPL
169757	2002 PL_{31}	—	August 6, 2002	Palomar	NEAT	·	1.7 km	MPC · JPL
169758	2002 PF_{34}	—	August 7, 2002	Reedy Creek	J. Broughton	·	3.2 km	MPC · JPL
169759	2002 PT_{35}	—	August 6, 2002	Palomar	NEAT	(7744)	2.3 km	MPC · JPL
169760	2002 PD_{41}	—	August 4, 2002	Socorro	LINEAR	·	4.4 km	MPC · JPL
169761	2002 PE_{48}	—	August 10, 2002	Socorro	LINEAR	GEF	2.5 km	MPC · JPL
169762	2002 PF_{49}	—	August 10, 2002	Socorro	LINEAR	RAF	1.8 km	MPC · JPL
169763	2002 PL_{51}	—	August 8, 2002	Palomar	NEAT	·	2.3 km	MPC · JPL
169764	2002 PC_{57}	—	August 9, 2002	Socorro	LINEAR	·	3.3 km	MPC · JPL
169765	2002 PF_{60}	—	August 10, 2002	Socorro	LINEAR	·	4.3 km	MPC · JPL
169766	2002 PJ_{71}	—	August 12, 2002	Socorro	LINEAR	ADE	2.7 km	MPC · JPL
169767	2002 PS_{73}	—	August 12, 2002	Socorro	LINEAR	·	3.4 km	MPC · JPL
169768	2002 PY_{77}	—	August 11, 2002	Haleakala	NEAT	·	3.8 km	MPC · JPL
169769	2002 PW_{85}	—	August 13, 2002	Socorro	LINEAR	·	1.8 km	MPC · JPL
169770	2002 PJ_{89}	—	August 11, 2002	Socorro	LINEAR	·	2.9 km	MPC · JPL
169771	2002 PV_{89}	—	August 11, 2002	Socorro	LINEAR	·	3.8 km	MPC · JPL
169772	2002 PD_{90}	—	August 11, 2002	Socorro	LINEAR	·	3.2 km	MPC · JPL
169773	2002 PM_{90}	—	August 11, 2002	Socorro	LINEAR	·	3.6 km	MPC · JPL
169774	2002 PP_{90}	—	August 12, 2002	Socorro	LINEAR	·	6.9 km	MPC · JPL
169775	2002 PM_{99}	—	August 14, 2002	Socorro	LINEAR	·	3.3 km	MPC · JPL
169776	2002 PF_{102}	—	August 12, 2002	Socorro	LINEAR	·	3.2 km	MPC · JPL
169777	2002 PU_{102}	—	August 12, 2002	Socorro	LINEAR	fast	3.7 km	MPC · JPL
169778	2002 PW_{102}	—	August 12, 2002	Socorro	LINEAR	·	2.5 km	MPC · JPL
169779	2002 PC_{104}	—	August 12, 2002	Socorro	LINEAR	·	3.2 km	MPC · JPL
169780	2002 PR_{116}	—	August 14, 2002	Anderson Mesa	LONEOS	·	4.2 km	MPC · JPL
169781	2002 PG_{121}	—	August 13, 2002	Anderson Mesa	LONEOS	·	3.9 km	MPC · JPL
169782	2002 PT_{123}	—	August 13, 2002	Anderson Mesa	LONEOS	·	2.9 km	MPC · JPL
169783	2002 PB_{133}	—	August 14, 2002	Socorro	LINEAR	·	2.1 km	MPC · JPL
169784	2002 PP_{133}	—	August 14, 2002	Socorro	LINEAR	·	3.1 km	MPC · JPL
169785	2002 PX_{134}	—	August 14, 2002	Socorro	LINEAR	·	2.9 km	MPC · JPL
169786	2002 PS_{136}	—	August 15, 2002	Palomar	NEAT	·	2.0 km	MPC · JPL
169787	2002 PH_{137}	—	August 15, 2002	Anderson Mesa	LONEOS	·	3.1 km	MPC · JPL
169788	2002 PT_{139}	—	August 13, 2002	Socorro	LINEAR	·	4.0 km	MPC · JPL
169789	2002 PZ_{156}	—	August 8, 2002	Palomar	S. F. Hönig	·	1.5 km	MPC · JPL
169790	2002 PD_{157}	—	August 8, 2002	Palomar	S. F. Hönig	·	2.2 km	MPC · JPL
169791	2002 PB_{158}	—	August 8, 2002	Palomar	S. F. Hönig	·	2.3 km	MPC · JPL
169792	2002 PP_{161}	—	August 8, 2002	Palomar	S. F. Hönig	·	2.2 km	MPC · JPL
169793	2002 PU_{164}	—	August 8, 2002	Palomar	S. F. Hönig	·	1.7 km	MPC · JPL
169794	2002 PD_{171}	—	August 7, 2002	Palomar	NEAT	·	2.0 km	MPC · JPL
169795	2002 PE_{173}	—	August 11, 2002	Haleakala	NEAT	·	3.2 km	MPC · JPL
169796	2002 PV_{177}	—	August 8, 2002	Palomar	NEAT	·	2.1 km	MPC · JPL
169797	2002 PU_{180}	—	August 15, 2002	Palomar	NEAT	·	1.2 km	MPC · JPL
169798	2002 PZ_{180}	—	August 15, 2002	Palomar	NEAT	·	2.5 km	MPC · JPL
169799	2002 QO	—	August 16, 2002	Socorro	LINEAR	DOR	5.7 km	MPC · JPL
169800	2002 QJ_{4}	—	August 16, 2002	Haleakala	NEAT	AGN	1.7 km	MPC · JPL

== 169801–169900 ==
back to top

Designation			Discovery			Properties		Ref
Permanent	Provisional	Named after	Date	Site	Discoverer(s)	Category	Diam.	Ref
169801	2002 QP_{6}	—	August 19, 2002	Kvistaberg	Uppsala-DLR Asteroid Survey	·	3.0 km	MPC · JPL
169802	2002 QK_{7}	—	August 16, 2002	Palomar	NEAT	·	3.9 km	MPC · JPL
169803	2002 QG_{11}	—	August 26, 2002	Palomar	NEAT	·	1.9 km	MPC · JPL
169804	2002 QJ_{16}	—	August 26, 2002	Palomar	NEAT	HOF	3.6 km	MPC · JPL
169805	2002 QO_{16}	—	August 26, 2002	Palomar	NEAT	·	3.6 km	MPC · JPL
169806	2002 QQ_{18}	—	August 26, 2002	Palomar	NEAT	AGN	1.9 km	MPC · JPL
169807	2002 QE_{19}	—	August 26, 2002	Palomar	NEAT	NEM	3.5 km	MPC · JPL
169808	2002 QG_{19}	—	August 26, 2002	Palomar	NEAT	·	1.6 km	MPC · JPL
169809	2002 QN_{20}	—	August 28, 2002	Palomar	NEAT	·	3.0 km	MPC · JPL
169810	2002 QU_{29}	—	August 29, 2002	Palomar	NEAT	·	1.6 km	MPC · JPL
169811	2002 QU_{31}	—	August 29, 2002	Palomar	NEAT	MAR	3.7 km	MPC · JPL
169812	2002 QT_{35}	—	August 29, 2002	Palomar	NEAT	HNS	2.0 km	MPC · JPL
169813	2002 QU_{41}	—	August 29, 2002	Palomar	NEAT	·	2.7 km	MPC · JPL
169814	2002 QH_{46}	—	August 29, 2002	Palomar	NEAT	MRX	1.9 km	MPC · JPL
169815	2002 QH_{54}	—	August 28, 2002	Palomar	R. Matson	·	4.5 km	MPC · JPL
169816	2002 QK_{55}	—	August 29, 2002	Palomar	S. F. Hönig	·	2.3 km	MPC · JPL
169817	2002 QS_{55}	—	August 29, 2002	Palomar	S. F. Hönig	·	2.0 km	MPC · JPL
169818	2002 QC_{56}	—	August 29, 2002	Palomar	S. F. Hönig	·	3.2 km	MPC · JPL
169819	2002 QE_{57}	—	August 29, 2002	Palomar	S. F. Hönig	·	3.4 km	MPC · JPL
169820	2002 QO_{57}	—	August 17, 2002	Palomar	Lowe, A.	·	2.9 km	MPC · JPL
169821	2002 QT_{57}	—	August 29, 2002	Palomar	S. F. Hönig	·	2.9 km	MPC · JPL
169822	2002 QV_{58}	—	August 26, 2002	Palomar	NEAT	PAD	2.9 km	MPC · JPL
169823	2002 QL_{62}	—	August 17, 2002	Palomar	NEAT	·	1.2 km	MPC · JPL
169824	2002 QM_{67}	—	August 27, 2002	Palomar	NEAT	·	3.9 km	MPC · JPL
169825	2002 QQ_{67}	—	August 18, 2002	Palomar	NEAT	·	2.0 km	MPC · JPL
169826	2002 QQ_{68}	—	August 27, 2002	Palomar	NEAT	·	3.3 km	MPC · JPL
169827	2002 QH_{69}	—	August 28, 2002	Palomar	NEAT	EUN	1.9 km	MPC · JPL
169828	2002 QU_{71}	—	August 19, 2002	Palomar	NEAT	(5)	1.8 km	MPC · JPL
169829	2002 QF_{72}	—	August 17, 2002	Palomar	NEAT	·	2.3 km	MPC · JPL
169830	2002 QW_{78}	—	August 17, 2002	Palomar	NEAT	EOS	2.7 km	MPC · JPL
169831	2002 QL_{80}	—	August 26, 2002	Palomar	NEAT	·	2.6 km	MPC · JPL
169832	2002 QG_{88}	—	August 27, 2002	Palomar	NEAT	·	2.2 km	MPC · JPL
169833	2002 QY_{92}	—	August 19, 2002	Palomar	NEAT	·	5.0 km	MPC · JPL
169834 Hujie	2002 QX_{95}	Hujie	August 28, 2002	Palomar	NEAT	·	2.3 km	MPC · JPL
169835	2002 QG_{97}	—	August 18, 2002	Palomar	NEAT	·	2.8 km	MPC · JPL
169836	2002 QC_{101}	—	August 19, 2002	Palomar	NEAT	·	2.9 km	MPC · JPL
169837	2002 QA_{107}	—	August 17, 2002	Palomar	NEAT	(5)	3.8 km	MPC · JPL
169838	2002 QU_{109}	—	August 17, 2002	Palomar	NEAT	·	1.6 km	MPC · JPL
169839	2002 QX_{120}	—	August 16, 2002	Palomar	NEAT	(13314)	2.4 km	MPC · JPL
169840	2002 RN_{1}	—	September 3, 2002	Palomar	NEAT	EUN	2.5 km	MPC · JPL
169841	2002 RZ_{3}	—	September 2, 2002	Palomar	NEAT	·	2.3 km	MPC · JPL
169842	2002 RF_{7}	—	September 2, 2002	Haleakala	NEAT	·	2.3 km	MPC · JPL
169843	2002 RT_{8}	—	September 4, 2002	Campo Imperatore	CINEOS	·	3.7 km	MPC · JPL
169844	2002 RD_{9}	—	September 4, 2002	Palomar	NEAT	(7744)	2.4 km	MPC · JPL
169845	2002 RG_{10}	—	September 4, 2002	Palomar	NEAT	·	5.3 km	MPC · JPL
169846	2002 RS_{11}	—	September 4, 2002	Anderson Mesa	LONEOS	HOF	4.1 km	MPC · JPL
169847	2002 RF_{15}	—	September 4, 2002	Anderson Mesa	LONEOS	·	3.0 km	MPC · JPL
169848	2002 RJ_{21}	—	September 4, 2002	Anderson Mesa	LONEOS	KOR	2.5 km	MPC · JPL
169849	2002 RQ_{23}	—	September 4, 2002	Anderson Mesa	LONEOS	KOR	2.1 km	MPC · JPL
169850	2002 RC_{30}	—	September 4, 2002	Anderson Mesa	LONEOS	·	5.7 km	MPC · JPL
169851	2002 RL_{34}	—	September 4, 2002	Anderson Mesa	LONEOS	·	3.1 km	MPC · JPL
169852	2002 RH_{38}	—	September 5, 2002	Anderson Mesa	LONEOS	·	4.8 km	MPC · JPL
169853	2002 RK_{38}	—	September 5, 2002	Anderson Mesa	LONEOS	DOR	2.9 km	MPC · JPL
169854	2002 RB_{39}	—	September 5, 2002	Socorro	LINEAR	(13314)	4.5 km	MPC · JPL
169855	2002 RU_{41}	—	September 5, 2002	Socorro	LINEAR	slow	4.6 km	MPC · JPL
169856	2002 RD_{42}	—	September 5, 2002	Socorro	LINEAR	·	3.1 km	MPC · JPL
169857	2002 RV_{43}	—	September 5, 2002	Socorro	LINEAR	·	1.6 km	MPC · JPL
169858	2002 RG_{44}	—	September 5, 2002	Anderson Mesa	LONEOS	PAD	3.8 km	MPC · JPL
169859	2002 RD_{45}	—	September 5, 2002	Socorro	LINEAR	(5)	2.0 km	MPC · JPL
169860	2002 RW_{56}	—	September 5, 2002	Anderson Mesa	LONEOS	·	3.7 km	MPC · JPL
169861	2002 RU_{57}	—	September 5, 2002	Anderson Mesa	LONEOS	·	3.4 km	MPC · JPL
169862	2002 RY_{60}	—	September 5, 2002	Socorro	LINEAR	GEF	2.3 km	MPC · JPL
169863	2002 RO_{65}	—	September 5, 2002	Socorro	LINEAR	·	7.3 km	MPC · JPL
169864	2002 RP_{75}	—	September 5, 2002	Socorro	LINEAR	·	2.8 km	MPC · JPL
169865	2002 RW_{75}	—	September 5, 2002	Socorro	LINEAR	·	4.2 km	MPC · JPL
169866	2002 RG_{76}	—	September 5, 2002	Socorro	LINEAR	PAD	3.6 km	MPC · JPL
169867	2002 RD_{89}	—	September 5, 2002	Socorro	LINEAR	AGN	1.8 km	MPC · JPL
169868	2002 RT_{93}	—	September 5, 2002	Anderson Mesa	LONEOS	·	4.0 km	MPC · JPL
169869	2002 RE_{94}	—	September 5, 2002	Socorro	LINEAR	·	4.3 km	MPC · JPL
169870	2002 RA_{96}	—	September 5, 2002	Socorro	LINEAR	MRX	2.1 km	MPC · JPL
169871	2002 RQ_{98}	—	September 5, 2002	Socorro	LINEAR	·	4.1 km	MPC · JPL
169872	2002 RN_{103}	—	September 5, 2002	Socorro	LINEAR	GEF	2.0 km	MPC · JPL
169873	2002 RP_{105}	—	September 5, 2002	Socorro	LINEAR	(18466)	4.0 km	MPC · JPL
169874	2002 RN_{116}	—	September 7, 2002	Socorro	LINEAR	·	4.0 km	MPC · JPL
169875	2002 RF_{118}	—	September 7, 2002	Pla D'Arguines	R. Ferrando	·	3.6 km	MPC · JPL
169876	2002 RC_{120}	—	September 3, 2002	Campo Imperatore	CINEOS	HNS	1.7 km	MPC · JPL
169877	2002 RC_{129}	—	September 10, 2002	Haleakala	NEAT	·	7.6 km	MPC · JPL
169878	2002 RC_{131}	—	September 11, 2002	Palomar	NEAT	·	2.3 km	MPC · JPL
169879	2002 RO_{139}	—	September 10, 2002	Palomar	NEAT	·	4.5 km	MPC · JPL
169880	2002 RG_{143}	—	September 11, 2002	Palomar	NEAT	·	2.7 km	MPC · JPL
169881	2002 RM_{144}	—	September 11, 2002	Palomar	NEAT	·	3.1 km	MPC · JPL
169882	2002 RH_{146}	—	September 11, 2002	Palomar	NEAT	·	3.1 km	MPC · JPL
169883	2002 RL_{151}	—	September 12, 2002	Palomar	NEAT	·	2.6 km	MPC · JPL
169884	2002 RZ_{151}	—	September 12, 2002	Palomar	NEAT	GEF	2.0 km	MPC · JPL
169885	2002 RE_{152}	—	September 12, 2002	Palomar	NEAT	·	3.3 km	MPC · JPL
169886	2002 RA_{158}	—	September 11, 2002	Palomar	NEAT	DOR	3.5 km	MPC · JPL
169887	2002 RM_{165}	—	September 13, 2002	Palomar	NEAT	KOR	1.7 km	MPC · JPL
169888	2002 RE_{167}	—	September 13, 2002	Socorro	LINEAR	(13314)	4.4 km	MPC · JPL
169889	2002 RL_{168}	—	September 13, 2002	Palomar	NEAT	(13314)	4.0 km	MPC · JPL
169890	2002 RC_{172}	—	September 13, 2002	Anderson Mesa	LONEOS	·	2.3 km	MPC · JPL
169891	2002 RN_{172}	—	September 13, 2002	Palomar	NEAT	EOS	3.4 km	MPC · JPL
169892	2002 RL_{173}	—	September 13, 2002	Socorro	LINEAR	·	2.7 km	MPC · JPL
169893	2002 RP_{174}	—	September 13, 2002	Palomar	NEAT	·	2.1 km	MPC · JPL
169894	2002 RV_{174}	—	September 13, 2002	Palomar	NEAT	EOS	3.4 km	MPC · JPL
169895	2002 RB_{176}	—	September 13, 2002	Palomar	NEAT	WIT	1.9 km	MPC · JPL
169896	2002 RD_{182}	—	September 11, 2002	Palomar	NEAT	·	3.6 km	MPC · JPL
169897	2002 RE_{186}	—	September 12, 2002	Palomar	NEAT	·	4.0 km	MPC · JPL
169898	2002 RJ_{189}	—	September 14, 2002	Palomar	NEAT	·	3.4 km	MPC · JPL
169899	2002 RX_{203}	—	September 14, 2002	Palomar	NEAT	·	2.3 km	MPC · JPL
169900	2002 RH_{204}	—	September 14, 2002	Palomar	NEAT	WIT	1.8 km	MPC · JPL

== 169901–170000 ==
back to top

Designation			Discovery			Properties		Ref
Permanent	Provisional	Named after	Date	Site	Discoverer(s)	Category	Diam.	Ref
169901	2002 RT_{206}	—	September 14, 2002	Palomar	NEAT	·	2.6 km	MPC · JPL
169902	2002 RL_{207}	—	September 14, 2002	Palomar	NEAT	AGN	2.1 km	MPC · JPL
169903	2002 RM_{209}	—	September 14, 2002	Palomar	NEAT	·	2.6 km	MPC · JPL
169904	2002 RV_{211}	—	September 15, 2002	Haleakala	NEAT	·	3.3 km	MPC · JPL
169905	2002 RR_{227}	—	September 14, 2002	Palomar	NEAT	AGN	1.7 km	MPC · JPL
169906	2002 RS_{230}	—	September 15, 2002	Palomar	NEAT	·	2.6 km	MPC · JPL
169907	2002 RS_{233}	—	September 14, 2002	Palomar	R. Matson	·	2.4 km	MPC · JPL
169908	2002 RU_{238}	—	September 12, 2002	Palomar	R. Matson	·	2.2 km	MPC · JPL
169909	2002 RY_{238}	—	September 14, 2002	Palomar	R. Matson	(5)	1.8 km	MPC · JPL
169910	2002 RP_{247}	—	September 1, 2002	Palomar	NEAT	·	3.4 km	MPC · JPL
169911	2002 RY_{255}	—	September 4, 2002	Palomar	NEAT	·	1.8 km	MPC · JPL
169912	2002 RP_{268}	—	September 4, 2002	Palomar	NEAT	·	2.8 km	MPC · JPL
169913	2002 RL_{272}	—	September 4, 2002	Palomar	NEAT	·	1.9 km	MPC · JPL
169914	2002 SD_{4}	—	September 26, 2002	Haleakala	NEAT	·	4.3 km	MPC · JPL
169915	2002 SR_{8}	—	September 27, 2002	Palomar	NEAT	·	3.0 km	MPC · JPL
169916	2002 SH_{10}	—	September 27, 2002	Palomar	NEAT	·	2.8 km	MPC · JPL
169917	2002 SG_{13}	—	September 27, 2002	Palomar	NEAT	H	830 m	MPC · JPL
169918	2002 SE_{14}	—	September 27, 2002	Palomar	NEAT	·	2.3 km	MPC · JPL
169919	2002 SK_{14}	—	September 27, 2002	Palomar	NEAT	KOR	1.9 km	MPC · JPL
169920	2002 SQ_{14}	—	September 27, 2002	Palomar	NEAT	DOR	5.2 km	MPC · JPL
169921	2002 SB_{15}	—	September 27, 2002	Palomar	NEAT	·	4.4 km	MPC · JPL
169922	2002 SE_{18}	—	September 28, 2002	Palomar	NEAT	·	3.5 km	MPC · JPL
169923	2002 SS_{20}	—	September 26, 2002	Palomar	NEAT	·	2.3 km	MPC · JPL
169924	2002 SR_{26}	—	September 29, 2002	Haleakala	NEAT	·	3.0 km	MPC · JPL
169925	2002 SP_{33}	—	September 28, 2002	Haleakala	NEAT	EUN	2.2 km	MPC · JPL
169926	2002 SD_{40}	—	September 30, 2002	Haleakala	NEAT	·	3.0 km	MPC · JPL
169927	2002 SN_{47}	—	September 30, 2002	Socorro	LINEAR	·	4.0 km	MPC · JPL
169928	2002 SR_{49}	—	September 30, 2002	Socorro	LINEAR	·	3.5 km	MPC · JPL
169929	2002 SR_{60}	—	September 16, 2002	Palomar	NEAT	AGN	2.2 km	MPC · JPL
169930	2002 TZ_{7}	—	October 1, 2002	Haleakala	NEAT	(11882)	2.7 km	MPC · JPL
169931	2002 TW_{10}	—	October 1, 2002	Kvistaberg	Uppsala-DLR Asteroid Survey	JUN	1.8 km	MPC · JPL
169932	2002 TX_{11}	—	October 1, 2002	Anderson Mesa	LONEOS	·	3.6 km	MPC · JPL
169933	2002 TB_{12}	—	October 1, 2002	Anderson Mesa	LONEOS	·	2.6 km	MPC · JPL
169934	2002 TA_{16}	—	October 2, 2002	Socorro	LINEAR	·	3.1 km	MPC · JPL
169935	2002 TP_{22}	—	October 2, 2002	Socorro	LINEAR	AGN	1.9 km	MPC · JPL
169936	2002 TA_{28}	—	October 2, 2002	Socorro	LINEAR	KOR	2.5 km	MPC · JPL
169937	2002 TE_{28}	—	October 2, 2002	Socorro	LINEAR	·	3.2 km	MPC · JPL
169938	2002 TQ_{30}	—	October 2, 2002	Socorro	LINEAR	·	2.7 km	MPC · JPL
169939	2002 TV_{32}	—	October 2, 2002	Socorro	LINEAR	·	3.9 km	MPC · JPL
169940	2002 TM_{34}	—	October 2, 2002	Socorro	LINEAR	·	3.2 km	MPC · JPL
169941	2002 TX_{34}	—	October 2, 2002	Socorro	LINEAR	·	6.6 km	MPC · JPL
169942	2002 TL_{40}	—	October 2, 2002	Socorro	LINEAR	LIX	6.6 km	MPC · JPL
169943	2002 TJ_{45}	—	October 2, 2002	Socorro	LINEAR	·	5.3 km	MPC · JPL
169944	2002 TO_{45}	—	October 2, 2002	Socorro	LINEAR	·	4.4 km	MPC · JPL
169945	2002 TM_{47}	—	October 2, 2002	Socorro	LINEAR	·	4.7 km	MPC · JPL
169946	2002 TG_{49}	—	October 2, 2002	Socorro	LINEAR	·	3.9 km	MPC · JPL
169947	2002 TD_{54}	—	October 2, 2002	Socorro	LINEAR	·	4.0 km	MPC · JPL
169948	2002 TZ_{62}	—	October 3, 2002	Campo Imperatore	CINEOS	·	3.7 km	MPC · JPL
169949	2002 TG_{65}	—	October 4, 2002	Socorro	LINEAR	EOS	2.7 km	MPC · JPL
169950	2002 TL_{66}	—	October 3, 2002	Socorro	LINEAR	·	5.2 km	MPC · JPL
169951	2002 TO_{69}	—	October 8, 2002	Socorro	LINEAR	·	2.6 km	MPC · JPL
169952	2002 TZ_{73}	—	October 3, 2002	Palomar	NEAT	·	3.2 km	MPC · JPL
169953	2002 TY_{79}	—	October 1, 2002	Socorro	LINEAR	·	2.9 km	MPC · JPL
169954	2002 TX_{87}	—	October 3, 2002	Socorro	LINEAR	KOR	2.1 km	MPC · JPL
169955	2002 TJ_{94}	—	October 3, 2002	Socorro	LINEAR	NEM	3.8 km	MPC · JPL
169956	2002 TW_{97}	—	October 3, 2002	Palomar	NEAT	·	2.3 km	MPC · JPL
169957	2002 TN_{98}	—	October 3, 2002	Socorro	LINEAR	(16286)	2.7 km	MPC · JPL
169958	2002 TP_{101}	—	October 4, 2002	Socorro	LINEAR	·	3.0 km	MPC · JPL
169959	2002 TG_{113}	—	October 3, 2002	Palomar	NEAT	·	3.4 km	MPC · JPL
169960	2002 TF_{116}	—	October 3, 2002	Palomar	NEAT	·	3.6 km	MPC · JPL
169961	2002 TZ_{116}	—	October 3, 2002	Palomar	NEAT	·	4.9 km	MPC · JPL
169962	2002 TZ_{119}	—	October 3, 2002	Palomar	NEAT	·	3.8 km	MPC · JPL
169963	2002 TP_{127}	—	October 4, 2002	Palomar	NEAT	·	4.7 km	MPC · JPL
169964	2002 TD_{130}	—	October 4, 2002	Socorro	LINEAR	·	3.9 km	MPC · JPL
169965	2002 TW_{131}	—	October 4, 2002	Socorro	LINEAR	·	3.9 km	MPC · JPL
169966	2002 TE_{132}	—	October 4, 2002	Socorro	LINEAR	·	4.5 km	MPC · JPL
169967	2002 TB_{136}	—	October 4, 2002	Anderson Mesa	LONEOS	EOS	4.7 km	MPC · JPL
169968	2002 TE_{143}	—	October 4, 2002	Socorro	LINEAR	·	2.7 km	MPC · JPL
169969	2002 TD_{147}	—	October 4, 2002	Socorro	LINEAR	·	2.4 km	MPC · JPL
169970	2002 TP_{158}	—	October 5, 2002	Palomar	NEAT	·	3.1 km	MPC · JPL
169971	2002 TJ_{168}	—	October 3, 2002	Socorro	LINEAR	·	2.2 km	MPC · JPL
169972	2002 TO_{168}	—	October 3, 2002	Palomar	NEAT	·	3.8 km	MPC · JPL
169973	2002 TK_{172}	—	October 4, 2002	Anderson Mesa	LONEOS	(18466)	5.1 km	MPC · JPL
169974	2002 TU_{175}	—	October 4, 2002	Anderson Mesa	LONEOS	·	3.8 km	MPC · JPL
169975	2002 TJ_{176}	—	October 5, 2002	Palomar	NEAT	·	4.5 km	MPC · JPL
169976	2002 TZ_{184}	—	October 4, 2002	Socorro	LINEAR	HYG	4.2 km	MPC · JPL
169977	2002 TT_{185}	—	October 4, 2002	Socorro	LINEAR	·	3.5 km	MPC · JPL
169978	2002 TW_{191}	—	October 5, 2002	Anderson Mesa	LONEOS	·	4.2 km	MPC · JPL
169979	2002 TP_{192}	—	October 5, 2002	Anderson Mesa	LONEOS	·	5.4 km	MPC · JPL
169980	2002 TS_{194}	—	October 3, 2002	Socorro	LINEAR	·	2.3 km	MPC · JPL
169981	2002 TH_{197}	—	October 4, 2002	Socorro	LINEAR	·	6.8 km	MPC · JPL
169982	2002 TF_{200}	—	October 9, 2002	Bergisch Gladbach	W. Bickel	·	2.9 km	MPC · JPL
169983	2002 TP_{211}	—	October 5, 2002	Socorro	LINEAR	·	5.5 km	MPC · JPL
169984	2002 TS_{211}	—	October 6, 2002	Haleakala	NEAT	·	3.2 km	MPC · JPL
169985	2002 TJ_{213}	—	October 3, 2002	Socorro	LINEAR	KOR	2.1 km	MPC · JPL
169986	2002 TB_{217}	—	October 7, 2002	Palomar	NEAT	·	1.8 km	MPC · JPL
169987	2002 TK_{219}	—	October 5, 2002	Socorro	LINEAR	·	3.1 km	MPC · JPL
169988	2002 TC_{220}	—	October 5, 2002	Socorro	LINEAR	·	8.7 km	MPC · JPL
169989	2002 TN_{234}	—	October 6, 2002	Socorro	LINEAR	·	4.9 km	MPC · JPL
169990	2002 TZ_{240}	—	October 7, 2002	Socorro	LINEAR	·	3.1 km	MPC · JPL
169991	2002 TH_{245}	—	October 7, 2002	Haleakala	NEAT	·	4.7 km	MPC · JPL
169992	2002 TN_{247}	—	October 10, 2002	Kitt Peak	Spacewatch	PAD	3.4 km	MPC · JPL
169993	2002 TG_{248}	—	October 7, 2002	Palomar	NEAT	KOR	2.0 km	MPC · JPL
169994	2002 TE_{250}	—	October 7, 2002	Socorro	LINEAR	AGN	1.6 km	MPC · JPL
169995	2002 TF_{254}	—	October 9, 2002	Anderson Mesa	LONEOS	·	2.9 km	MPC · JPL
169996	2002 TX_{262}	—	October 10, 2002	Palomar	NEAT	KOR	2.8 km	MPC · JPL
169997	2002 TR_{263}	—	October 10, 2002	Socorro	LINEAR	(5)	2.1 km	MPC · JPL
169998	2002 TU_{263}	—	October 10, 2002	Socorro	LINEAR	EOS	4.2 km	MPC · JPL
169999	2002 TN_{273}	—	October 9, 2002	Socorro	LINEAR	(5)	2.4 km	MPC · JPL
170000	2002 TE_{281}	—	October 10, 2002	Socorro	LINEAR	·	2.9 km	MPC · JPL

back to top

== See also ==
- Meanings of minor-planet names: 169001–170000
