= Gordon Richards =

Gordon Richards may refer to:

- Gordon Richards (jockey) (1904–1986), English jockey
- Gordon Richards (actor) (1893–1964), English actor
- Gordon Richards (astronomer) (born 1972), American astronomer
- Gordon Richards (footballer) (1933–1993), Welsh footballer
- Gordon W. Richards (1930–1998), British racehorse trainer

== See also ==
- Asteroid 166747 Gordonrichards, named after the astronomer
