= Marc Postman =

American astronomer (born 1958)

- Born: April 6, 1958 (age 68); New York City, U.S.
- Education: MIT; Harvard University
- Awards: AURA Award for Outstanding Scientific Achievement (1993, 2013)
- Scientific career
- Fields: Astronomy
- Workplaces: Space Telescope Science Institute; Princeton University
- Doctoral advisor: Margaret J. Geller

Marc Postman (born April 6, 1958) is an American astronomer at the Space Telescope Science Institute in Baltimore, Maryland, United States. His research interests include observational studies of the formation and evolution of galaxies and large scale structure in the universe. His work focuses on determining, observationally, the relationships between galaxy-scale phenomena and the surrounding large-scale environment and matter distribution. His recent research includes characterizing the properties of brightest cluster galaxies and placing new constraints on the cosmic optical background.

== Career ==
Postman was the lead or co-investigator on several joint science and engineering working groups exploring the feasibility and science capabilities of future large optical / near infrared telescopes on the ground and in space. He served on the science and technology definition team for the Large Ultraviolet Optical Infrared Surveyor concept (aka LUVOIR), which was proposed to the 2020 Astronomy and Astrophysics Decadal Survey. A modified version of this concept, the Habitable Worlds Observatory, is now being developed by NASA. He was a member of the Hubble Space Telescope Advanced Camera for Surveys investigation team and project scientist for the STScI Digitized Sky Survey program. He has also served on the Council of the American Astronomical Society and on the Committee for the Status of Women in Astronomy. Postman was the Principal Investigator of the HST multi-cycle treasury program Cluster Lensing and Supernova survey with Hubble, a study of dark matter in clusters of galaxies. Postman is also a guest investigator on the New Horizons science team to study the ultraviolet and optical background radiation field as seen from the unique vantage point beyond 45 AU from the Sun. Most recently, Postman and collaborator Tod R. Lauer are using sky survey data to model the largest brightest cluster galaxies to identify those that may host the most supermassive black holes.

Postman attended the Massachusetts Institute of Technology as an undergraduate from 1978 to 1981, receiving a S.B. in Physics in 1981. He then went on to obtain his Ph.D. in Astronomy at Harvard University, working with Dr. Margaret Geller. After receiving his Ph.D. in 1986, he was a postdoctoral fellow working with Prof. James E. Gunn in Princeton University’s Department of Astronomy. In 1989, he joined the scientific research staff at the Space Telescope Science Institute. Postman served as the interim Deputy Director of the Space Telescope Science Institute from mid-2022 to early 2024. He is currently head of the Science Mission Office at the Institute, which oversees and supports the institute's research staff and postdoctoral fellows.

Marc Postman is the son of educator, author and cultural critic Neil Postman.

== Awards and honors ==
Postman received the Association of Universities for Research in Astronomy (AURA)’s Outstanding Scientific Achievement Award in 1993 and again in 2013. Asteroid 166746 Marcpostman discovered by the Sloan Digital Sky Survey at Apache Point Observatory in 2002, was named in his honor. The official naming citation was published by the Minor Planet Center on 27 January 2013 (M.P.C. 82401).

He was elected a Legacy Fellow of the American Astronomical Society in 2020.
