= Timothy Beers =

American astrophysicist (born 1957)

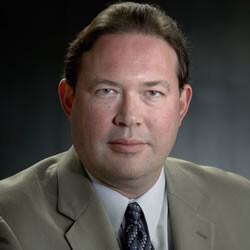
- Born: Timothy Carter Beers; June 24, 1957 (age 69)
- Education: Purdue University; Harvard University
- Scientific career
- Fields: Astrophysics
- Workplaces: Michigan State University; University of Notre Dame
- Thesis: Dynamical Studies of Clusters of Galaxies (1983)
- Doctoral advisor: Margaret J. Geller

Timothy C. Beers (born June 24, 1957) is an American astrophysicist. Beers teaches at the University of Notre Dame in the Department of Physics (2014–present), where he holds the Notre Dame Chair in Astrophysics. He is a co-founder of the Physics Frontier Center Joint Institute for Nuclear Astrophysics – Center for the Evolution of the Elements. Prior to coming to Notre Dame, Beers was Director of Kitt Peak National Observatory (2011-2014), and for 25 years was a professor in the Department of Physics and Astronomy at Michigan State University (1986-2011), retiring from that position as University Distinguished Professor.

Beers has published more than 425 refereed papers, and has received multiple Highly Cited Author awards. Beers is a Fellow of the American Physical Society, and was recognized with a Humboldt Senior Research award in 2009 by the Alexander von Humboldt Foundation of Germany. In 2017 he was presented a Distinguished Alumnus award from the Purdue University College of Science.

For decades, Beers has designed and executed large-scale surveys of stars in the Milky Way, sifting through millions of individual stars to find objects that have recorded the chemical history of the universe in their atmospheres. These rare objects, known as "metal-poor stars", are the most chemically primitive stars known, and are among the first generations of stars born in our galaxy, the Milky Way. They provide information on the astrophysical nucleosynthesis sites of the chemical elements and are powerful tracers of the assembly and evolution of large spiral galaxies.

Beers’ discoveries include: (1) The identification of the first metal-poor stars with measured abundances of Uranium, enabling the determination of a radioactive decay age limit on the Universe, (2) a class of stars known as carbon-enhanced metal-poor (CEMP) stars, a subset of which are thought to reflect the nucleosynthesis products of the very first stars in the Universe, and (3) The first large-scale chronographic (age) maps of the halo of the Milky Way, which astronomers can compare with simulations of the formation of the galaxy. In 2017, Beers and his graduate students were part of a team that identified the characteristic signature of the astrophysical r-process in the kilonova associated with a neutron star merger. This site is thought to be responsible for the production of over half of the elements in the periodic table heavier than iron.

Beers earned his PhD. in astronomy in 1983 from Harvard University. He also holds a master's degree in astronomy from Harvard University (1980), as well as bachelor's degrees of science in physics and in Metallurgical Engineering (1979), both from Purdue University.

== Selected publications ==
- Drout, M. R.; Piro, A. L.; Shappee, B. J.; Kilpatrick, C. D.; Simon, J. D.; et al. (2017-10-16). "Light curves of the neutron star merger GW170817/SSS17a: Implications for r-process nucleosynthesis". Science. 358 (6370). American Association for the Advancement of Science (AAAS): 1570–1574. arXiv:1710.05443. Bibcode:2017Sci...358.1570D. doi:10.1126/science.aaq0049. ISSN 0036-8075. PMID 29038375. S2CID 206664846.
- Carollo, D.; Beers, T. C.; Placco, V. M.; Santucci, R. M.; Denissenkov, P.; Tissera, P. B.; Lentner, G.; Rossi, S.; Lee, Y. S.; Tumlinson, J. (2016-09-05). "The age structure of the Milky Way's halo". Nature Physics. 12 (12). Springer Science and Business Media LLC: 1170–1176. arXiv:1607.08628. Bibcode:2016NatPh..12.1170C. doi:10.1038/nphys3874. ISSN 1745-2473. S2CID 119246999.
- Placco, Vinicius M.; Beers, Timothy C.; Roederer, Ian U.; Cowan, John J.; Frebel, Anna; Filler, Dan; Ivans, Inese I.; Lawler, James E.; Schatz, Hendrik; Sneden, Christopher; Sobeck, Jennifer S.; Aoki, Wako; Smith, Verne V. (2014-06-30). "Hubble Space Telescope Near-Ultraviolet Spectroscopy of the Bright CEMP-no Star BD+44°493". The Astrophysical Journal. 790 (1). IOP Publishing: 34. arXiv:1406.0538. Bibcode:2014ApJ...790...34P. doi:10.1088/0004-637x/790/1/34. ISSN 0004-637X. S2CID 19023182.
- Beers, Timothy C.; Christlieb, Norbert (2005). "The Discovery and Analysis of Very Metal-Poor Stars in the Galaxy". Annual Review of Astronomy and Astrophysics. 43 (1). Annual Reviews: 531–580. Bibcode:2005ARA&A..43..531B. doi:10.1146/annurev.astro.42.053102.134057. ISSN 0066-4146.
- Cayrel, R.; Hill, V.; Beers, T. C.; Barbuy, B.; Spite, M.; Spite, F.; Plez, B.; Andersen, J.; Bonifacio, P.; François, P.; Molaro, P.; Nordström, B.; Primas, F. (2001). "Measurement of stellar age from uranium decay". Nature. 409 (6821): 691–692. arXiv:astro-ph/0104357. Bibcode:2001Natur.409..691C. doi:10.1038/35055507. ISSN 0028-0836. PMID 11217852. S2CID 17251766.
- Beers, T.C.; Preston, G.W.; Shectman, S.A (1992). "A Search For Stars of Very Low Metal Abundance. II". Astronomical Journal. 103 (6): 1987. Bibcode:1992AJ....103.1987B. doi:10.1086/116207. S2CID 121564385.
