= Margaret Geller =

American astrophysicist (born 1947)

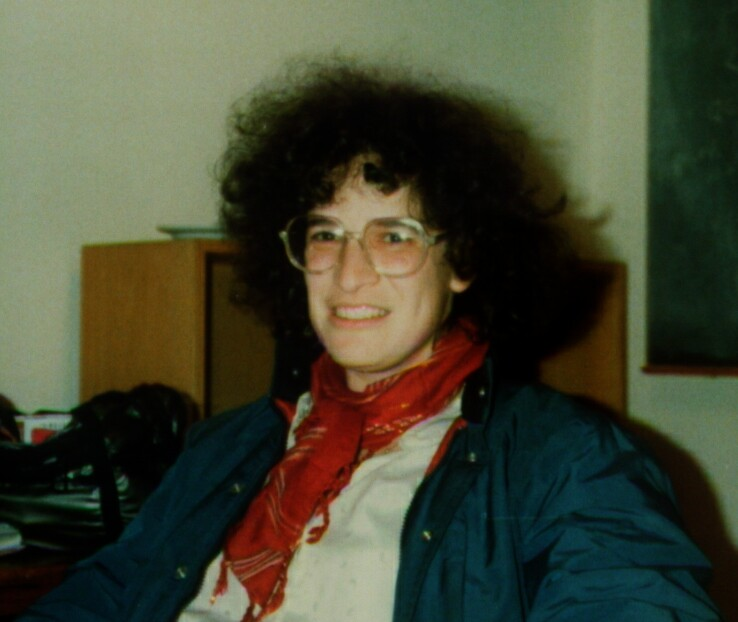
- Geller in 1981
- Born: Margaret Joan Geller; December 8, 1947 (age 78); Ithaca, New York
- Education: UC Berkeley (B.A., 1970); Princeton University (M.A., 1972); Princeton University (Ph.D., 1974)
- Awards: Newcomb Cleveland Prize (1989); MacArthur Fellowship (1990); Klopsteg Memorial Award (1996); Magellanic Premium (2008); James Craig Watson Medal (2010); Russell Lectureship (2010); Lilienfeld Prize (2013); Karl Schwarzschild Medal (2014)
- Scientific career
- Fields: Astrophysics: Galaxies and Cosmology
- Workplaces: Smithsonian Astrophysical Observatory
- Thesis: Bright Galaxies in Rich Clusters: A Statistical Model for Magnitude Distributions. (1974)
- Doctoral advisor: Jim Peebles
- Doctoral students: Timothy Beers; Marc Postman

Margaret J. Geller (born December 8, 1947) is an American astrophysicist at the Center for Astrophysics | Harvard & Smithsonian. Her work has included pioneering maps of the nearby universe, studies of the relationship between galaxies and their environment, and the development and application of methods for measuring the distribution of matter in the universe.

== Career ==
Geller made pioneering maps of large-scale structure in the universe. Geller received a Bachelor of Arts degree in Physics at the University of California, Berkeley (1970) and a Ph.D. in Physics from Princeton (1974). Geller completed her doctoral dissertation, titled "Bright galaxies in rich clusters: a statistical model for magnitude distributions", under the supervision of James Peebles. Although Geller was thinking about studying solid state physics in graduate school, Charles Kittel suggested she go to Princeton to study astrophysics.

After research fellowships at the Center for Astrophysics | Harvard & Smithsonian and the Institute of Astronomy in Cambridge, England, she became an assistant professor of Astronomy at Harvard University (1980-1983). She then joined the permanent scientific staff of the Smithsonian Astrophysical Observatory, a partner in the Center for Astrophysics | Harvard & Smithsonian.

Geller is a Fellow of the American Association for the Advancement of Science and a Fellow of the American Physical Society. In 1990, she was elected as a Fellow of the American Academy of Arts and Sciences. Two years later, she was elected to the Physics section of the US National Academy of Sciences. From 2000 to 2003, she served on the Council of the National Academy of Sciences. She has received seven honorary degrees (D. S. H. C. or L. H. C.).

== Research ==
Geller is known for observational and theoretical work in cosmology and extragalactic astronomy. Her long range goals are to discover what the universe looks like and to understand how the patterns we observe today evolved. In the 1980s, she made pioneering maps of the nearby universe, which included the Great Wall and was the inspiration for Jasper Johns 2020 piece called Slice. Her SHELS (Smithsonian Hectospec Lensing Survey) project maps the distribution of dark matter in the universe. With the 6.5-m MMT, she leads a deeper survey of the middle-aged universe called HectoMAP. Geller has developed innovative techniques for investigating the structure and mass of clusters of galaxies and the relationship between clusters and their surroundings.

Geller is also a co-discoverer of hypervelocity stars which may be an important tracer of the matter distribution in the Galaxy.

== Films and public lectures ==
Geller has made several films for public education. Her 8-minute video Where the Galaxies Are (1989) was the first graphic voyage through the observed universe and was awarded a CINE Gold Eagle. A later 40-minute film, So Many Galaxies...So Little Time, contains more sophisticated prize-winning (IEEE/Siggraph) graphics and was on display at the National Air and Space Museum.

Geller has lectured extensively to public audiences around the world. She has lectured twice in the main amphitheater at the Chautauqua Institution.

She is included in NPR's list of The Best Commencement Speeches, Ever.

Her story about her entry into astrophysics and meeting the renowned astrophysicist John Archibald Wheeler, entitled "Mapping the Universe" was published by The Story Collider podcast on May 21, 2014.

How Geller weaved books into her life experience and how they were a large part of her life, which was published by Phil Treagus-Evans from "thereadinglists".

== Books ==
Geller's work is discussed in Physics in the Twentieth Century. Popular articles by Geller appear with those by Robert Woodrow Wilson, David Todd Wilkinson, J. Anthony Tyson and Vera Rubin in Beyond Earth: Mapping the Universe and with others by Alan Lightman, Robert Kirshner, Vera Rubin, Alan Guth, and James E. Gunn in Bubbles, Voids and Bumps in Time: The New Cosmology.

== Awards and honors ==
- 1989 Newcomb Cleveland Prize of the American Association for the Advancement of Science along with John P. Huchra for "Mapping the Universe"
- 1990 MacArthur Foundation Fellowship
- 1990 American Academy of Arts and Science
- 1992 National Academy of Sciences
- 1993 Helen Sawyer Hogg Lecture of the Canadian Astronomical Society
- 1996 Klopsteg Memorial Award of the American Association of Physics Teachers
- 1997 New York Public Library Library Lion
- 2003 La Medaille de l'ADION of Nice Observatory
- 2008 Magellanic Premium by the American Philosophical Society for her research into the groupings of galaxies.
- 2009 Honorary Degree (D.S.H.C.) from Colby College
- 2010 Henry Norris Russell Lectureship of the American Astronomical Society
- 2010 James Craig Watson Medal of the National Academy of Sciences
- 2013 Julius Edgar Lilienfeld Prize of the American Physical Society
- 2014 Karl Schwarzschild Medal of the German Astronomical Society
- 2014 Honorary Degree (D.S.H.C.) from Dartmouth College
- 2017 Honorary Degree (L.H.C.) from University of Turin
