= Meanings of minor-planet names: 166001–167000 =

As minor planet discoveries are confirmed, they are given a permanent number by the IAU's Minor Planet Center (MPC), and the discoverers can then submit names for them, following the IAU's naming conventions. The list below concerns those minor planets in the specified number-range that have received names, and explains the meanings of those names.

Official naming citations of newly named small Solar System bodies are approved and published in a bulletin by IAU's Working Group for Small Bodies Nomenclature (WGSBN). Before May 2021, citations were published in MPC's Minor Planet Circulars for many decades. Recent citations can also be found on the JPL Small-Body Database (SBDB). Until his death in 2016, German astronomer Lutz D. Schmadel compiled these citations into the Dictionary of Minor Planet Names (DMP) and regularly updated the collection.

Based on Paul Herget's The Names of the Minor Planets, Schmadel also researched the unclear origin of numerous asteroids, most of which had been named prior to World War II. This article incorporates text from this source, which is in the public domain: SBDB New namings may only be added to this list below after official publication as the preannouncement of names is condemned. The WGSBN publishes a comprehensive guideline for the naming rules of non-cometary small Solar System bodies.

== 166001–166100 ==
Named minor planet	Provisional	This minor planet was named for...	Ref · Catalog
166028 Karikókatalin	2002 AR_{204}	Katalin Karikó (born 1955) is a Hungarian biochemist and researcher of mRNA-technologies for protein therapies.	IAU · 166028

== 166101–166200 ==
back to top

Named minor planet	Provisional	This minor planet was named for...	Ref · Catalog
There are no named minor planets in this number range

== 166201–166300 ==
back to top

Named minor planet	Provisional	This minor planet was named for...	Ref · Catalog
166229 Palanga	2002 FS_{16}	Palanga is a seaside resort town in western Lithuania	JPL · 166229

== 166301–166400 ==
back to top

Named minor planet	Provisional	This minor planet was named for...	Ref · Catalog
166349 Rundell	2002 KO_{3}	William “Bill” Rundell, Scottish mathematics professor at Texas A&M University.	IAU · 166349

== 166401–166500 ==
back to top

Named minor planet	Provisional	This minor planet was named for...	Ref · Catalog
166444 Lange	2002 PJ_{54}	Hannah Lange, American astronomy.	IAU · 166444

== 166501–166600 ==
back to top

Named minor planet	Provisional	This minor planet was named for...	Ref · Catalog
166570 Adolfträger	2002 RG_{118}	Adolf Träger (1888–1965), Czech landscape painter	JPL · 166570

== 166601–166700 ==
back to top

Named minor planet	Provisional	This minor planet was named for...	Ref · Catalog
166614 Zsazsa	2002 RG_{250}	Zsa Zsa Gábor (1917–2016), Hungarian-American actress and socialite	JPL · 166614
166622 Sébastien	2002 SR_{15}	Sébastien Rodriguez (born 1976) is an assistant professor at the University of Paris Diderot and specializes in remote sensing of planetary surfaces and atmospheres.	JPL · 166622

== 166701–166800 ==
back to top

Named minor planet	Provisional	This minor planet was named for...	Ref · Catalog
166745 Pindor	2002 TV_{307}	Bartosz Pindor (born 1975), Canadian astronomer with the Sloan Digital Sky Survey	JPL · 166745
166746 Marcpostman	2002 TY_{311}	Marc Postman (born 1958), American astronomer with the Sloan Digital Sky Survey	JPL · 166746
166747 Gordonrichards	2002 TB_{316}	Gordon Richards (born 1972), American astronomer with the Sloan Digital Sky Survey who studies the demographics and physics of quasars	JPL · 166747
166748 Timrayschneider	2002 TW_{320}	Donald Schneider (born 1955), American astronomer with the Sloan Digital Sky Survey	JPL · 166748
166749 Sesar	2002 TV_{366}	Branimir Sesar (born 1980), Croatian-American astronomer with the Sloan Digital Sky Survey	JPL · 166749

== 166801–166900 ==
back to top

Named minor planet	Provisional	This minor planet was named for...	Ref · Catalog
166886 Ybl	2002 YB_{3}	Miklós Ybl (1814–1891), a Hungarian architect	JPL · 166886

== 166901–167000 ==
back to top

Named minor planet	Provisional	This minor planet was named for...	Ref · Catalog
166944 Seton	2003 HP_{53}	Elizabeth Ann Bayley Seton (1774–1821), an educator, spiritual leader and saint.	JPL · 166944
166974 Joanbinimelis	2003 OZ_{5}	Joan Binimelis García (1539–1616), a Spanish astronomer, geographer and physician.	IAU · 166974

back to top

Preceded by 165,001–166,000	Meanings of minor-planet names List of minor planets: 166,001–167,000	Succeeded by 167,001–168,000
