= List of minor planets: 166001–167000 =

The following is a partial list of minor planets, running from minor-planet number 166001 through 167000, inclusive. The primary data for this and other partial lists is based on JPL's "Small-Body Orbital Elements" and data available from the Minor Planet Center. Critical list information is also provided by the MPC, unless otherwise specified from Lowell Observatory. A detailed description of the table's columns and additional sources are given on the main page including a complete list of every page in this series, and a statistical break-up on the dynamical classification of minor planets.

Also see the summary list of all named bodies in numerical and alphabetical order, and the corresponding naming citations for the number range of this particular list. New namings may only be added to this list after official publication, as the preannouncement of names is condemned by the Working Group for Small Bodies Nomenclature of the International Astronomical Union.

Near-Earth obj.	MBA (inner)	MBA (outer)	Centaur
Mars-crosser	MBA (middle)	Jupiter trojan	Trans-Neptunian obj.
Unclassified

== 166001–166100 ==
Designation			Discovery			Properties		Ref
Permanent	Provisional	Named after	Date	Site	Discoverer(s)	Category	Diam.	Ref
166001	2002 AV_{51}	—	January 9, 2002	Socorro	LINEAR	·	1.2 km	MPC · JPL
166002	2002 AW_{58}	—	January 9, 2002	Socorro	LINEAR	·	1.4 km	MPC · JPL
166003	2002 AD_{64}	—	January 11, 2002	Socorro	LINEAR	·	3.8 km	MPC · JPL
166004	2002 AA_{67}	—	January 14, 2002	Desert Eagle	W. K. Y. Yeung	·	6.9 km	MPC · JPL
166005	2002 AL_{72}	—	January 8, 2002	Socorro	LINEAR	·	1.2 km	MPC · JPL
166006	2002 AH_{91}	—	January 13, 2002	Socorro	LINEAR	·	1.5 km	MPC · JPL
166007	2002 AY_{108}	—	January 9, 2002	Socorro	LINEAR	·	2.3 km	MPC · JPL
166008	2002 AL_{112}	—	January 9, 2002	Socorro	LINEAR	·	1.2 km	MPC · JPL
166009	2002 AS_{114}	—	January 9, 2002	Socorro	LINEAR	·	2.2 km	MPC · JPL
166010	2002 AL_{115}	—	January 9, 2002	Socorro	LINEAR	·	3.3 km	MPC · JPL
166011	2002 AS_{119}	—	January 9, 2002	Socorro	LINEAR	·	1.6 km	MPC · JPL
166012	2002 AU_{125}	—	January 11, 2002	Socorro	LINEAR	V	1.3 km	MPC · JPL
166013	2002 AD_{128}	—	January 13, 2002	Socorro	LINEAR	·	1.0 km	MPC · JPL
166014	2002 AQ_{138}	—	January 9, 2002	Socorro	LINEAR	·	1.1 km	MPC · JPL
166015	2002 AD_{143}	—	January 13, 2002	Socorro	LINEAR	·	1.1 km	MPC · JPL
166016	2002 AO_{143}	—	January 13, 2002	Socorro	LINEAR	·	1.6 km	MPC · JPL
166017	2002 AJ_{152}	—	January 14, 2002	Socorro	LINEAR	·	2.0 km	MPC · JPL
166018	2002 AN_{154}	—	January 14, 2002	Socorro	LINEAR	·	1.6 km	MPC · JPL
166019	2002 AN_{160}	—	January 13, 2002	Socorro	LINEAR	·	1.3 km	MPC · JPL
166020	2002 AZ_{162}	—	January 13, 2002	Socorro	LINEAR	·	1.4 km	MPC · JPL
166021	2002 AN_{163}	—	January 13, 2002	Socorro	LINEAR	·	1.3 km	MPC · JPL
166022	2002 AT_{163}	—	January 13, 2002	Socorro	LINEAR	·	1.1 km	MPC · JPL
166023	2002 AB_{171}	—	January 14, 2002	Socorro	LINEAR	NYS	1.8 km	MPC · JPL
166024	2002 AZ_{176}	—	January 14, 2002	Socorro	LINEAR	·	1.1 km	MPC · JPL
166025	2002 AE_{192}	—	January 12, 2002	Palomar	NEAT	·	1.1 km	MPC · JPL
166026	2002 AF_{192}	—	January 12, 2002	Palomar	NEAT	·	1.8 km	MPC · JPL
166027	2002 AV_{202}	—	January 13, 2002	Socorro	LINEAR	·	1.9 km	MPC · JPL
166028 Karikókatalin	2002 AR_{204}	Karikókatalin	January 11, 2002	Piszkéstető	K. Sárneczky, Z. Heiner	·	1.4 km	MPC · JPL
166029	2002 BN_{8}	—	January 18, 2002	Socorro	LINEAR	·	1.4 km	MPC · JPL
166030	2002 BJ_{10}	—	January 18, 2002	Socorro	LINEAR	·	1.5 km	MPC · JPL
166031	2002 BP_{12}	—	January 20, 2002	Kitt Peak	Spacewatch	·	950 m	MPC · JPL
166032	2002 BA_{14}	—	January 19, 2002	Socorro	LINEAR	·	2.1 km	MPC · JPL
166033	2002 BZ_{16}	—	January 19, 2002	Socorro	LINEAR	·	1.5 km	MPC · JPL
166034	2002 BG_{17}	—	January 19, 2002	Socorro	LINEAR	·	1.3 km	MPC · JPL
166035	2002 BC_{20}	—	January 22, 2002	Socorro	LINEAR	·	1.2 km	MPC · JPL
166036	2002 BH_{23}	—	January 23, 2002	Socorro	LINEAR	·	1.2 km	MPC · JPL
166037	2002 BR_{25}	—	January 25, 2002	Palomar	NEAT	slow	1.4 km	MPC · JPL
166038	2002 BD_{31}	—	January 19, 2002	Socorro	LINEAR	·	860 m	MPC · JPL
166039	2002 CZ_{2}	—	February 3, 2002	Palomar	NEAT	·	1.3 km	MPC · JPL
166040	2002 CE_{11}	—	February 6, 2002	Desert Eagle	W. K. Y. Yeung	NYS	1.7 km	MPC · JPL
166041	2002 CJ_{11}	—	February 5, 2002	Anderson Mesa	LONEOS	·	2.2 km	MPC · JPL
166042	2002 CC_{12}	—	February 6, 2002	Socorro	LINEAR	·	1.5 km	MPC · JPL
166043	2002 CN_{13}	—	February 8, 2002	Desert Eagle	W. K. Y. Yeung	·	1.1 km	MPC · JPL
166044	2002 CE_{14}	—	February 7, 2002	Socorro	LINEAR	·	1.6 km	MPC · JPL
166045	2002 CJ_{17}	—	February 6, 2002	Socorro	LINEAR	·	1.2 km	MPC · JPL
166046	2002 CL_{18}	—	February 6, 2002	Socorro	LINEAR	PHO	2.1 km	MPC · JPL
166047	2002 CC_{21}	—	February 4, 2002	Haleakala	NEAT	·	2.8 km	MPC · JPL
166048	2002 CH_{21}	—	February 5, 2002	Palomar	NEAT	·	1.8 km	MPC · JPL
166049	2002 CN_{21}	—	February 5, 2002	Palomar	NEAT	·	960 m	MPC · JPL
166050	2002 CJ_{27}	—	February 6, 2002	Socorro	LINEAR	·	3.6 km	MPC · JPL
166051	2002 CM_{28}	—	February 6, 2002	Socorro	LINEAR	·	1.2 km	MPC · JPL
166052	2002 CW_{32}	—	February 6, 2002	Socorro	LINEAR	·	2.4 km	MPC · JPL
166053	2002 CH_{39}	—	February 11, 2002	Desert Eagle	W. K. Y. Yeung	·	1.5 km	MPC · JPL
166054	2002 CX_{48}	—	February 3, 2002	Haleakala	NEAT	·	1.5 km	MPC · JPL
166055	2002 CL_{49}	—	February 3, 2002	Haleakala	NEAT	·	2.0 km	MPC · JPL
166056	2002 CR_{49}	—	February 3, 2002	Haleakala	NEAT	·	1.3 km	MPC · JPL
166057	2002 CO_{51}	—	February 12, 2002	Desert Eagle	W. K. Y. Yeung	NYS	1.9 km	MPC · JPL
166058	2002 CK_{52}	—	February 12, 2002	Desert Eagle	W. K. Y. Yeung	·	1.8 km	MPC · JPL
166059	2002 CZ_{52}	—	February 7, 2002	Socorro	LINEAR	·	1.7 km	MPC · JPL
166060	2002 CE_{53}	—	February 7, 2002	Socorro	LINEAR	·	2.1 km	MPC · JPL
166061	2002 CJ_{54}	—	February 7, 2002	Socorro	LINEAR	NYS	1.6 km	MPC · JPL
166062	2002 CF_{60}	—	February 6, 2002	Socorro	LINEAR	·	1.7 km	MPC · JPL
166063	2002 CT_{60}	—	February 6, 2002	Socorro	LINEAR	·	1.4 km	MPC · JPL
166064	2002 CF_{62}	—	February 6, 2002	Socorro	LINEAR	·	1.3 km	MPC · JPL
166065	2002 CU_{69}	—	February 7, 2002	Socorro	LINEAR	MAS	1.1 km	MPC · JPL
166066	2002 CF_{75}	—	February 7, 2002	Socorro	LINEAR	·	1.9 km	MPC · JPL
166067	2002 CK_{76}	—	February 7, 2002	Socorro	LINEAR	·	1.1 km	MPC · JPL
166068	2002 CW_{76}	—	February 7, 2002	Socorro	LINEAR	MAS	1.4 km	MPC · JPL
166069	2002 CJ_{79}	—	February 7, 2002	Socorro	LINEAR	NYS	1.6 km	MPC · JPL
166070	2002 CC_{80}	—	February 7, 2002	Socorro	LINEAR	·	1.2 km	MPC · JPL
166071	2002 CD_{80}	—	February 7, 2002	Socorro	LINEAR	V	1.2 km	MPC · JPL
166072	2002 CT_{81}	—	February 7, 2002	Socorro	LINEAR	·	1.6 km	MPC · JPL
166073	2002 CZ_{86}	—	February 7, 2002	Socorro	LINEAR	·	2.5 km	MPC · JPL
166074	2002 CH_{93}	—	February 7, 2002	Socorro	LINEAR	·	2.3 km	MPC · JPL
166075	2002 CX_{95}	—	February 7, 2002	Socorro	LINEAR	·	1.6 km	MPC · JPL
166076	2002 CQ_{97}	—	February 7, 2002	Socorro	LINEAR	·	4.0 km	MPC · JPL
166077	2002 CX_{100}	—	February 7, 2002	Socorro	LINEAR	·	1.5 km	MPC · JPL
166078	2002 CS_{102}	—	February 7, 2002	Socorro	LINEAR	·	1.8 km	MPC · JPL
166079	2002 CW_{102}	—	February 7, 2002	Socorro	LINEAR	·	1.9 km	MPC · JPL
166080	2002 CX_{102}	—	February 7, 2002	Socorro	LINEAR	NYS	1.8 km	MPC · JPL
166081	2002 CR_{103}	—	February 7, 2002	Socorro	LINEAR	·	1.7 km	MPC · JPL
166082	2002 CR_{106}	—	February 7, 2002	Socorro	LINEAR	·	2.7 km	MPC · JPL
166083	2002 CF_{112}	—	February 7, 2002	Socorro	LINEAR	·	1.9 km	MPC · JPL
166084	2002 CF_{117}	—	February 8, 2002	Oaxaca	Roe, J. M.	·	1.6 km	MPC · JPL
166085	2002 CU_{117}	—	February 12, 2002	Desert Eagle	W. K. Y. Yeung	ERI	2.5 km	MPC · JPL
166086	2002 CX_{117}	—	February 12, 2002	Desert Eagle	W. K. Y. Yeung	NYS	2.1 km	MPC · JPL
166087	2002 CR_{123}	—	February 7, 2002	Socorro	LINEAR	NYS	1.8 km	MPC · JPL
166088	2002 CF_{125}	—	February 7, 2002	Socorro	LINEAR	·	1.4 km	MPC · JPL
166089	2002 CH_{129}	—	February 7, 2002	Socorro	LINEAR	·	1.2 km	MPC · JPL
166090	2002 CG_{130}	—	February 7, 2002	Socorro	LINEAR	MAS	1.3 km	MPC · JPL
166091	2002 CV_{132}	—	February 7, 2002	Socorro	LINEAR	NYS	1.8 km	MPC · JPL
166092	2002 CO_{137}	—	February 8, 2002	Socorro	LINEAR	·	1.0 km	MPC · JPL
166093	2002 CV_{139}	—	February 8, 2002	Socorro	LINEAR	·	830 m	MPC · JPL
166094	2002 CZ_{140}	—	February 8, 2002	Socorro	LINEAR	·	1.2 km	MPC · JPL
166095	2002 CW_{142}	—	February 9, 2002	Socorro	LINEAR	·	1.6 km	MPC · JPL
166096	2002 CJ_{144}	—	February 9, 2002	Socorro	LINEAR	NYS	1.7 km	MPC · JPL
166097	2002 CU_{151}	—	February 10, 2002	Socorro	LINEAR	NYS	1.8 km	MPC · JPL
166098	2002 CT_{153}	—	February 8, 2002	Kitt Peak	Spacewatch	·	1.1 km	MPC · JPL
166099	2002 CJ_{156}	—	February 6, 2002	Socorro	LINEAR	·	1.2 km	MPC · JPL
166100	2002 CK_{158}	—	February 7, 2002	Socorro	LINEAR	·	1.1 km	MPC · JPL

== 166101–166200 ==
back to top

Designation			Discovery			Properties		Ref
Permanent	Provisional	Named after	Date	Site	Discoverer(s)	Category	Diam.	Ref
166101	2002 CV_{159}	—	February 8, 2002	Socorro	LINEAR	·	1.5 km	MPC · JPL
166102	2002 CF_{160}	—	February 8, 2002	Socorro	LINEAR	·	1.3 km	MPC · JPL
166103	2002 CY_{168}	—	February 8, 2002	Socorro	LINEAR	·	1.5 km	MPC · JPL
166104	2002 CZ_{168}	—	February 8, 2002	Socorro	LINEAR	V	1.3 km	MPC · JPL
166105	2002 CX_{169}	—	February 8, 2002	Socorro	LINEAR	·	1.4 km	MPC · JPL
166106	2002 CH_{170}	—	February 8, 2002	Socorro	LINEAR	·	1.5 km	MPC · JPL
166107	2002 CV_{171}	—	February 8, 2002	Socorro	LINEAR	·	1.5 km	MPC · JPL
166108	2002 CB_{174}	—	February 8, 2002	Socorro	LINEAR	·	1.0 km	MPC · JPL
166109	2002 CQ_{179}	—	February 10, 2002	Socorro	LINEAR	·	1.4 km	MPC · JPL
166110	2002 CQ_{184}	—	February 10, 2002	Socorro	LINEAR	·	1.7 km	MPC · JPL
166111	2002 CE_{185}	—	February 10, 2002	Socorro	LINEAR	·	1.3 km	MPC · JPL
166112	2002 CN_{195}	—	February 10, 2002	Socorro	LINEAR	·	1.4 km	MPC · JPL
166113	2002 CG_{204}	—	February 10, 2002	Socorro	LINEAR	·	1.9 km	MPC · JPL
166114	2002 CH_{205}	—	February 10, 2002	Socorro	LINEAR	·	2.1 km	MPC · JPL
166115	2002 CO_{208}	—	February 10, 2002	Socorro	LINEAR	L4	9.0 km	MPC · JPL
166116	2002 CJ_{214}	—	February 10, 2002	Socorro	LINEAR	MAS	1.0 km	MPC · JPL
166117	2002 CG_{215}	—	February 10, 2002	Socorro	LINEAR	·	1.3 km	MPC · JPL
166118	2002 CU_{216}	—	February 10, 2002	Socorro	LINEAR	·	1.2 km	MPC · JPL
166119	2002 CK_{220}	—	February 10, 2002	Socorro	LINEAR	·	2.5 km	MPC · JPL
166120	2002 CO_{220}	—	February 10, 2002	Socorro	LINEAR	MAS	1.1 km	MPC · JPL
166121	2002 CA_{221}	—	February 10, 2002	Socorro	LINEAR	V	990 m	MPC · JPL
166122	2002 CO_{221}	—	February 10, 2002	Socorro	LINEAR	·	1.2 km	MPC · JPL
166123	2002 CF_{223}	—	February 11, 2002	Socorro	LINEAR	L4	10 km	MPC · JPL
166124	2002 CW_{226}	—	February 6, 2002	Palomar	NEAT	·	1.6 km	MPC · JPL
166125	2002 CT_{227}	—	February 6, 2002	Palomar	NEAT	·	1.6 km	MPC · JPL
166126	2002 CT_{228}	—	February 6, 2002	Palomar	NEAT	V	980 m	MPC · JPL
166127	2002 CJ_{234}	—	February 7, 2002	Kitt Peak	Spacewatch	V	1.2 km	MPC · JPL
166128	2002 CP_{236}	—	February 8, 2002	Socorro	LINEAR	ERI	4.0 km	MPC · JPL
166129	2002 CR_{236}	—	February 8, 2002	Socorro	LINEAR	·	2.5 km	MPC · JPL
166130	2002 CP_{242}	—	February 11, 2002	Socorro	LINEAR	·	1.7 km	MPC · JPL
166131	2002 CS_{251}	—	February 3, 2002	Palomar	NEAT	·	1.4 km	MPC · JPL
166132	2002 CD_{253}	—	February 3, 2002	Haleakala	NEAT	·	1.4 km	MPC · JPL
166133	2002 CO_{260}	—	February 7, 2002	Palomar	NEAT	·	1.7 km	MPC · JPL
166134	2002 CR_{261}	—	February 7, 2002	Haleakala	NEAT	·	1.6 km	MPC · JPL
166135	2002 CJ_{286}	—	February 10, 2002	Socorro	LINEAR	·	1.6 km	MPC · JPL
166136	2002 CN_{296}	—	February 10, 2002	Socorro	LINEAR	L4	13 km	MPC · JPL
166137	2002 CW_{298}	—	February 11, 2002	Socorro	LINEAR	NYS	2.1 km	MPC · JPL
166138	2002 CZ_{311}	—	February 15, 2002	Socorro	LINEAR	V	980 m	MPC · JPL
166139	2002 DZ	—	February 16, 2002	Bohyunsan	Jeon, Y.-B., Lee, B.-C.	·	3.4 km	MPC · JPL
166140	2002 DR_{10}	—	February 20, 2002	Socorro	LINEAR	MAS	1.3 km	MPC · JPL
166141	2002 DF_{15}	—	February 16, 2002	Palomar	NEAT	·	1.3 km	MPC · JPL
166142	2002 EZ	—	March 5, 2002	Socorro	LINEAR	·	2.9 km	MPC · JPL
166143	2002 EC_{2}	—	March 9, 2002	Bohyunsan	Bohyunsan	·	1.5 km	MPC · JPL
166144	2002 EO_{3}	—	March 7, 2002	Cima Ekar	ADAS	NYS	1.6 km	MPC · JPL
166145	2002 EH_{5}	—	March 10, 2002	Cima Ekar	ADAS	·	990 m	MPC · JPL
166146	2002 EP_{12}	—	March 14, 2002	Desert Eagle	W. K. Y. Yeung	·	2.2 km	MPC · JPL
166147	2002 ED_{14}	—	March 5, 2002	Palomar	NEAT	·	1.5 km	MPC · JPL
166148	2002 EU_{14}	—	March 5, 2002	Kitt Peak	Spacewatch	L4	17 km	MPC · JPL
166149	2002 EO_{15}	—	March 5, 2002	Palomar	NEAT	·	1.6 km	MPC · JPL
166150	2002 EA_{16}	—	March 6, 2002	Palomar	NEAT	·	1.7 km	MPC · JPL
166151	2002 EM_{20}	—	March 9, 2002	Socorro	LINEAR	·	1.6 km	MPC · JPL
166152	2002 EQ_{23}	—	March 5, 2002	Kitt Peak	Spacewatch	·	1.8 km	MPC · JPL
166153	2002 ET_{24}	—	March 5, 2002	Kitt Peak	Spacewatch	·	1.4 km	MPC · JPL
166154	2002 EB_{28}	—	March 9, 2002	Socorro	LINEAR	V	1.1 km	MPC · JPL
166155	2002 EO_{28}	—	March 9, 2002	Socorro	LINEAR	·	2.0 km	MPC · JPL
166156	2002 EZ_{29}	—	March 9, 2002	Socorro	LINEAR	NYS	1.4 km	MPC · JPL
166157	2002 EB_{31}	—	March 9, 2002	Socorro	LINEAR	·	1.9 km	MPC · JPL
166158	2002 EE_{31}	—	March 9, 2002	Socorro	LINEAR	·	1.2 km	MPC · JPL
166159	2002 EV_{32}	—	March 11, 2002	Palomar	NEAT	·	1.4 km	MPC · JPL
166160	2002 EB_{33}	—	March 11, 2002	Palomar	NEAT	V	1.0 km	MPC · JPL
166161	2002 EH_{35}	—	March 11, 2002	Haleakala	NEAT	·	2.0 km	MPC · JPL
166162	2002 EK_{39}	—	March 9, 2002	Socorro	LINEAR	·	1.3 km	MPC · JPL
166163	2002 ER_{39}	—	March 9, 2002	Socorro	LINEAR	·	1.2 km	MPC · JPL
166164	2002 EV_{40}	—	March 9, 2002	Socorro	LINEAR	MAS	1.4 km	MPC · JPL
166165	2002 EV_{41}	—	March 12, 2002	Socorro	LINEAR	·	2.9 km	MPC · JPL
166166	2002 EC_{43}	—	March 12, 2002	Socorro	LINEAR	NYS	2.2 km	MPC · JPL
166167	2002 EY_{44}	—	March 10, 2002	Haleakala	NEAT	·	1.1 km	MPC · JPL
166168	2002 EC_{47}	—	March 12, 2002	Palomar	NEAT	·	1.1 km	MPC · JPL
166169	2002 EF_{49}	—	March 12, 2002	Palomar	NEAT	·	950 m	MPC · JPL
166170	2002 EP_{52}	—	March 9, 2002	Socorro	LINEAR	·	2.0 km	MPC · JPL
166171	2002 ES_{53}	—	March 13, 2002	Socorro	LINEAR	·	2.3 km	MPC · JPL
166172	2002 EF_{55}	—	March 12, 2002	Socorro	LINEAR	MAS	1.2 km	MPC · JPL
166173	2002 EO_{55}	—	March 13, 2002	Socorro	LINEAR	·	1.9 km	MPC · JPL
166174	2002 EO_{57}	—	March 13, 2002	Socorro	LINEAR	·	2.4 km	MPC · JPL
166175	2002 EE_{59}	—	March 13, 2002	Socorro	LINEAR	·	2.1 km	MPC · JPL
166176	2002 EC_{61}	—	March 13, 2002	Socorro	LINEAR	·	1.3 km	MPC · JPL
166177	2002 EA_{64}	—	March 13, 2002	Socorro	LINEAR	·	1.4 km	MPC · JPL
166178	2002 EE_{66}	—	March 13, 2002	Socorro	LINEAR	·	2.1 km	MPC · JPL
166179	2002 ED_{68}	—	March 13, 2002	Socorro	LINEAR	NYS	1.6 km	MPC · JPL
166180	2002 EH_{68}	—	March 13, 2002	Socorro	LINEAR	·	1.8 km	MPC · JPL
166181	2002 EW_{69}	—	March 13, 2002	Socorro	LINEAR	V	1.0 km	MPC · JPL
166182	2002 EN_{72}	—	March 13, 2002	Socorro	LINEAR	·	3.3 km	MPC · JPL
166183	2002 EY_{72}	—	March 13, 2002	Socorro	LINEAR	·	2.3 km	MPC · JPL
166184	2002 EA_{83}	—	March 13, 2002	Palomar	NEAT	·	1.4 km	MPC · JPL
166185	2002 EE_{83}	—	March 13, 2002	Palomar	NEAT	slow	1.7 km	MPC · JPL
166186	2002 EQ_{83}	—	March 9, 2002	Socorro	LINEAR	MAS	990 m	MPC · JPL
166187	2002 EY_{85}	—	March 9, 2002	Socorro	LINEAR	·	2.2 km	MPC · JPL
166188	2002 EF_{86}	—	March 9, 2002	Socorro	LINEAR	·	1.8 km	MPC · JPL
166189	2002 EX_{89}	—	March 12, 2002	Socorro	LINEAR	·	1.9 km	MPC · JPL
166190	2002 EL_{91}	—	March 12, 2002	Socorro	LINEAR	·	1.6 km	MPC · JPL
166191	2002 EP_{91}	—	March 12, 2002	Socorro	LINEAR	·	3.2 km	MPC · JPL
166192	2002 EW_{91}	—	March 13, 2002	Socorro	LINEAR	·	3.2 km	MPC · JPL
166193	2002 EO_{93}	—	March 14, 2002	Socorro	LINEAR	·	1.6 km	MPC · JPL
166194	2002 EQ_{93}	—	March 14, 2002	Socorro	LINEAR	·	1.9 km	MPC · JPL
166195	2002 EM_{95}	—	March 14, 2002	Socorro	LINEAR	·	2.9 km	MPC · JPL
166196	2002 EY_{96}	—	March 11, 2002	Kitt Peak	Spacewatch	NYS	1.5 km	MPC · JPL
166197	2002 EE_{103}	—	March 9, 2002	Palomar	NEAT	MAS	1.0 km	MPC · JPL
166198	2002 EK_{109}	—	March 9, 2002	Kitt Peak	Spacewatch	·	1.8 km	MPC · JPL
166199	2002 EY_{111}	—	March 9, 2002	Kitt Peak	Spacewatch	MAS	940 m	MPC · JPL
166200	2002 ES_{118}	—	March 10, 2002	Palomar	NEAT	·	1.4 km	MPC · JPL

== 166201–166300 ==
back to top

Designation			Discovery			Properties		Ref
Permanent	Provisional	Named after	Date	Site	Discoverer(s)	Category	Diam.	Ref
166201	2002 EL_{121}	—	March 11, 2002	Kitt Peak	Spacewatch	·	2.2 km	MPC · JPL
166202	2002 ER_{123}	—	March 12, 2002	Palomar	NEAT	NYS	1.5 km	MPC · JPL
166203	2002 ES_{123}	—	March 12, 2002	Socorro	LINEAR	MAS	1.3 km	MPC · JPL
166204	2002 EV_{124}	—	March 12, 2002	Palomar	NEAT	V	1.1 km	MPC · JPL
166205	2002 EA_{126}	—	March 12, 2002	Kitt Peak	Spacewatch	·	1.3 km	MPC · JPL
166206	2002 EL_{126}	—	March 12, 2002	Socorro	LINEAR	ERI	2.1 km	MPC · JPL
166207	2002 EW_{126}	—	March 12, 2002	Socorro	LINEAR	V	1.1 km	MPC · JPL
166208	2002 EL_{128}	—	March 12, 2002	Palomar	NEAT	·	1.0 km	MPC · JPL
166209	2002 EL_{129}	—	March 13, 2002	Socorro	LINEAR	V	990 m	MPC · JPL
166210	2002 ER_{133}	—	March 13, 2002	Palomar	NEAT	·	2.0 km	MPC · JPL
166211	2002 EP_{135}	—	March 14, 2002	Anderson Mesa	LONEOS	L4 · ERY	14 km	MPC · JPL
166212	2002 EX_{139}	—	March 12, 2002	Palomar	NEAT	·	1.2 km	MPC · JPL
166213	2002 EJ_{141}	—	March 12, 2002	Palomar	NEAT	·	1.6 km	MPC · JPL
166214	2002 EN_{144}	—	March 13, 2002	Kitt Peak	Spacewatch	·	1.7 km	MPC · JPL
166215	2002 EL_{146}	—	March 14, 2002	Palomar	NEAT	·	2.4 km	MPC · JPL
166216	2002 EV_{146}	—	March 14, 2002	Anderson Mesa	LONEOS	·	1.8 km	MPC · JPL
166217	2002 ED_{148}	—	March 15, 2002	Palomar	NEAT	MAS	1.1 km	MPC · JPL
166218	2002 EF_{149}	—	March 15, 2002	Palomar	NEAT	·	2.0 km	MPC · JPL
166219	2002 EU_{150}	—	March 15, 2002	Palomar	NEAT	·	2.5 km	MPC · JPL
166220	2002 EE_{153}	—	March 15, 2002	Palomar	NEAT	V	1.2 km	MPC · JPL
166221	2002 EC_{155}	—	March 13, 2002	Socorro	LINEAR	V	1.0 km	MPC · JPL
166222	2002 FY_{3}	—	March 20, 2002	Desert Eagle	W. K. Y. Yeung	V	1.2 km	MPC · JPL
166223	2002 FP_{6}	—	March 23, 2002	Nogales	Tenagra II	·	2.4 km	MPC · JPL
166224	2002 FH_{9}	—	March 16, 2002	Socorro	LINEAR	·	2.4 km	MPC · JPL
166225	2002 FP_{9}	—	March 16, 2002	Socorro	LINEAR	·	2.1 km	MPC · JPL
166226	2002 FF_{11}	—	March 16, 2002	Haleakala	NEAT	V	1.3 km	MPC · JPL
166227	2002 FQ_{11}	—	March 16, 2002	Socorro	LINEAR	V	1.1 km	MPC · JPL
166228	2002 FY_{12}	—	March 16, 2002	Socorro	LINEAR	·	2.1 km	MPC · JPL
166229 Palanga	2002 FS_{16}	Palanga	March 17, 2002	Moletai	K. Černis	·	2.3 km	MPC · JPL
166230	2002 FB_{17}	—	March 17, 2002	Kitt Peak	Spacewatch	L4	16 km	MPC · JPL
166231	2002 FX_{19}	—	March 18, 2002	Kitt Peak	Spacewatch	NYS	1.7 km	MPC · JPL
166232	2002 FR_{21}	—	March 19, 2002	Anderson Mesa	LONEOS	·	1.8 km	MPC · JPL
166233	2002 FL_{26}	—	March 20, 2002	Palomar	NEAT	·	1.4 km	MPC · JPL
166234	2002 FA_{28}	—	March 20, 2002	Anderson Mesa	LONEOS	MAS	1.2 km	MPC · JPL
166235	2002 FP_{29}	—	March 20, 2002	Socorro	LINEAR	·	1.8 km	MPC · JPL
166236	2002 FM_{33}	—	March 20, 2002	Socorro	LINEAR	·	4.0 km	MPC · JPL
166237	2002 FN_{33}	—	March 20, 2002	Socorro	LINEAR	V	1.3 km	MPC · JPL
166238	2002 FU_{33}	—	March 20, 2002	Socorro	LINEAR	·	1.7 km	MPC · JPL
166239	2002 FO_{37}	—	March 31, 2002	Palomar	NEAT	·	1.9 km	MPC · JPL
166240	2002 FP_{39}	—	March 16, 2002	Socorro	LINEAR	MAS	1.3 km	MPC · JPL
166241	2002 GF_{12}	—	April 15, 2002	Desert Eagle	W. K. Y. Yeung	·	1.8 km	MPC · JPL
166242	2002 GL_{12}	—	April 15, 2002	Palomar	NEAT	PHO	3.8 km	MPC · JPL
166243	2002 GL_{13}	—	April 14, 2002	Socorro	LINEAR	NYS	2.1 km	MPC · JPL
166244	2002 GD_{14}	—	April 14, 2002	Socorro	LINEAR	NYS	1.9 km	MPC · JPL
166245	2002 GG_{16}	—	April 15, 2002	Socorro	LINEAR	·	1.8 km	MPC · JPL
166246	2002 GR_{16}	—	April 15, 2002	Socorro	LINEAR	NYS ·	3.8 km	MPC · JPL
166247	2002 GB_{20}	—	April 14, 2002	Socorro	LINEAR	NYS	2.0 km	MPC · JPL
166248	2002 GZ_{20}	—	April 14, 2002	Socorro	LINEAR	MAS	1.4 km	MPC · JPL
166249	2002 GB_{21}	—	April 14, 2002	Socorro	LINEAR	NYS	2.4 km	MPC · JPL
166250	2002 GG_{23}	—	April 15, 2002	Palomar	NEAT	·	2.0 km	MPC · JPL
166251	2002 GU_{23}	—	April 15, 2002	Palomar	NEAT	NYS	1.8 km	MPC · JPL
166252	2002 GJ_{25}	—	April 13, 2002	Kitt Peak	Spacewatch	·	1.7 km	MPC · JPL
166253	2002 GD_{27}	—	April 15, 2002	Kitt Peak	Spacewatch	·	2.1 km	MPC · JPL
166254	2002 GO_{33}	—	April 1, 2002	Palomar	NEAT	·	1.3 km	MPC · JPL
166255	2002 GF_{42}	—	April 4, 2002	Palomar	NEAT	MAS	1.1 km	MPC · JPL
166256	2002 GV_{44}	—	April 4, 2002	Palomar	NEAT	·	2.9 km	MPC · JPL
166257	2002 GC_{55}	—	April 5, 2002	Anderson Mesa	LONEOS	·	1.2 km	MPC · JPL
166258	2002 GY_{60}	—	April 8, 2002	Palomar	NEAT	·	1.5 km	MPC · JPL
166259	2002 GE_{62}	—	April 8, 2002	Palomar	NEAT	·	2.0 km	MPC · JPL
166260	2002 GF_{65}	—	April 8, 2002	Kitt Peak	Spacewatch	V	1.2 km	MPC · JPL
166261	2002 GN_{65}	—	April 8, 2002	Kitt Peak	Spacewatch	·	1.9 km	MPC · JPL
166262	2002 GK_{68}	—	April 8, 2002	Socorro	LINEAR	·	3.5 km	MPC · JPL
166263	2002 GW_{69}	—	April 8, 2002	Palomar	NEAT	·	3.0 km	MPC · JPL
166264	2002 GL_{74}	—	April 9, 2002	Socorro	LINEAR	·	2.7 km	MPC · JPL
166265	2002 GM_{83}	—	April 10, 2002	Socorro	LINEAR	·	4.2 km	MPC · JPL
166266	2002 GO_{84}	—	April 10, 2002	Socorro	LINEAR	·	1.7 km	MPC · JPL
166267	2002 GW_{87}	—	April 10, 2002	Socorro	LINEAR	·	1.9 km	MPC · JPL
166268	2002 GQ_{89}	—	April 8, 2002	Palomar	NEAT	·	1.4 km	MPC · JPL
166269	2002 GY_{89}	—	April 8, 2002	Kitt Peak	Spacewatch	·	2.3 km	MPC · JPL
166270	2002 GG_{90}	—	April 8, 2002	Kitt Peak	Spacewatch	·	1.7 km	MPC · JPL
166271	2002 GT_{90}	—	April 8, 2002	Palomar	NEAT	·	1.9 km	MPC · JPL
166272	2002 GB_{94}	—	April 9, 2002	Socorro	LINEAR	·	2.8 km	MPC · JPL
166273	2002 GH_{94}	—	April 9, 2002	Socorro	LINEAR	·	2.0 km	MPC · JPL
166274	2002 GJ_{94}	—	April 9, 2002	Socorro	LINEAR	·	2.3 km	MPC · JPL
166275	2002 GS_{94}	—	April 9, 2002	Socorro	LINEAR	·	2.2 km	MPC · JPL
166276	2002 GN_{95}	—	April 9, 2002	Socorro	LINEAR	·	2.0 km	MPC · JPL
166277	2002 GM_{96}	—	April 9, 2002	Socorro	LINEAR	NYS	1.8 km	MPC · JPL
166278	2002 GQ_{96}	—	April 9, 2002	Socorro	LINEAR	V	1.7 km	MPC · JPL
166279	2002 GM_{99}	—	April 10, 2002	Socorro	LINEAR	·	1.4 km	MPC · JPL
166280	2002 GE_{111}	—	April 10, 2002	Socorro	LINEAR	·	2.2 km	MPC · JPL
166281	2002 GQ_{118}	—	April 12, 2002	Palomar	NEAT	·	1.2 km	MPC · JPL
166282	2002 GU_{123}	—	April 11, 2002	Socorro	LINEAR	·	1.3 km	MPC · JPL
166283	2002 GA_{125}	—	April 12, 2002	Socorro	LINEAR	·	1.3 km	MPC · JPL
166284	2002 GM_{125}	—	April 12, 2002	Socorro	LINEAR	V	970 m	MPC · JPL
166285	2002 GY_{127}	—	April 12, 2002	Socorro	LINEAR	L4	10 km	MPC · JPL
166286	2002 GB_{153}	—	April 12, 2002	Socorro	LINEAR	·	1.5 km	MPC · JPL
166287	2002 GQ_{153}	—	April 12, 2002	Haleakala	NEAT	·	1.5 km	MPC · JPL
166288	2002 GM_{160}	—	April 15, 2002	Palomar	NEAT	·	2.1 km	MPC · JPL
166289	2002 GH_{163}	—	April 14, 2002	Palomar	NEAT	·	1.7 km	MPC · JPL
166290	2002 HK_{4}	—	April 16, 2002	Socorro	LINEAR	·	2.7 km	MPC · JPL
166291	2002 HE_{10}	—	April 17, 2002	Socorro	LINEAR	·	2.5 km	MPC · JPL
166292	2002 HA_{16}	—	April 17, 2002	Socorro	LINEAR	BRG	2.4 km	MPC · JPL
166293	2002 HB_{16}	—	April 18, 2002	Kitt Peak	Spacewatch	·	1.6 km	MPC · JPL
166294	2002 HJ_{16}	—	April 18, 2002	Kitt Peak	Spacewatch	·	2.2 km	MPC · JPL
166295	2002 JL_{1}	—	May 3, 2002	Kitt Peak	Spacewatch	·	2.3 km	MPC · JPL
166296	2002 JP_{3}	—	May 3, 2002	Anderson Mesa	LONEOS	·	3.4 km	MPC · JPL
166297	2002 JC_{5}	—	May 5, 2002	Desert Eagle	W. K. Y. Yeung	MAS	1.4 km	MPC · JPL
166298	2002 JL_{6}	—	May 6, 2002	Kitt Peak	Spacewatch	·	1.6 km	MPC · JPL
166299	2002 JN_{8}	—	May 6, 2002	Palomar	NEAT	·	1.7 km	MPC · JPL
166300	2002 JG_{12}	—	May 4, 2002	Desert Eagle	W. K. Y. Yeung	MAS	1.1 km	MPC · JPL

== 166301–166400 ==
back to top

Designation			Discovery			Properties		Ref
Permanent	Provisional	Named after	Date	Site	Discoverer(s)	Category	Diam.	Ref
166301	2002 JJ_{13}	—	May 8, 2002	Desert Eagle	W. K. Y. Yeung	·	1.6 km	MPC · JPL
166302	2002 JV_{14}	—	May 8, 2002	Socorro	LINEAR	NYS	2.3 km	MPC · JPL
166303	2002 JX_{15}	—	May 5, 2002	Desert Eagle	W. K. Y. Yeung	·	1.6 km	MPC · JPL
166304	2002 JU_{16}	—	May 6, 2002	Palomar	NEAT	·	2.6 km	MPC · JPL
166305	2002 JX_{22}	—	May 8, 2002	Socorro	LINEAR	·	3.2 km	MPC · JPL
166306	2002 JT_{25}	—	May 8, 2002	Socorro	LINEAR	·	1.9 km	MPC · JPL
166307	2002 JA_{26}	—	May 8, 2002	Socorro	LINEAR	·	1.8 km	MPC · JPL
166308	2002 JQ_{27}	—	May 8, 2002	Socorro	LINEAR	NYS	1.6 km	MPC · JPL
166309	2002 JQ_{33}	—	May 9, 2002	Socorro	LINEAR	·	2.6 km	MPC · JPL
166310	2002 JU_{36}	—	May 7, 2002	Anderson Mesa	LONEOS	·	1.7 km	MPC · JPL
166311	2002 JX_{36}	—	May 7, 2002	Anderson Mesa	LONEOS	·	2.3 km	MPC · JPL
166312	2002 JY_{43}	—	May 9, 2002	Socorro	LINEAR	·	2.2 km	MPC · JPL
166313	2002 JM_{45}	—	May 9, 2002	Socorro	LINEAR	NYS	1.3 km	MPC · JPL
166314	2002 JW_{49}	—	May 9, 2002	Socorro	LINEAR	·	1.9 km	MPC · JPL
166315	2002 JS_{51}	—	May 9, 2002	Socorro	LINEAR	·	1.9 km	MPC · JPL
166316	2002 JX_{51}	—	May 9, 2002	Socorro	LINEAR	MAS	1.5 km	MPC · JPL
166317	2002 JY_{51}	—	May 9, 2002	Socorro	LINEAR	·	2.3 km	MPC · JPL
166318	2002 JR_{53}	—	May 9, 2002	Socorro	LINEAR	·	2.0 km	MPC · JPL
166319	2002 JZ_{61}	—	May 8, 2002	Socorro	LINEAR	·	2.0 km	MPC · JPL
166320	2002 JZ_{65}	—	May 9, 2002	Socorro	LINEAR	·	2.3 km	MPC · JPL
166321	2002 JT_{66}	—	May 10, 2002	Socorro	LINEAR	·	3.9 km	MPC · JPL
166322	2002 JP_{75}	—	May 9, 2002	Socorro	LINEAR	EUN	1.9 km	MPC · JPL
166323	2002 JZ_{76}	—	May 11, 2002	Socorro	LINEAR	·	1.6 km	MPC · JPL
166324	2002 JW_{79}	—	May 11, 2002	Socorro	LINEAR	MAS	1.1 km	MPC · JPL
166325	2002 JO_{83}	—	May 11, 2002	Socorro	LINEAR	·	1.9 km	MPC · JPL
166326	2002 JK_{87}	—	May 11, 2002	Socorro	LINEAR	·	1.4 km	MPC · JPL
166327	2002 JU_{88}	—	May 11, 2002	Socorro	LINEAR	·	1.9 km	MPC · JPL
166328	2002 JX_{89}	—	May 11, 2002	Socorro	LINEAR	·	1.6 km	MPC · JPL
166329	2002 JW_{90}	—	May 11, 2002	Socorro	LINEAR	·	3.1 km	MPC · JPL
166330	2002 JU_{93}	—	May 11, 2002	Socorro	LINEAR	MAS	1.5 km	MPC · JPL
166331	2002 JF_{94}	—	May 11, 2002	Socorro	LINEAR	·	1.8 km	MPC · JPL
166332	2002 JB_{95}	—	May 11, 2002	Socorro	LINEAR	NYS	1.9 km	MPC · JPL
166333	2002 JH_{95}	—	May 11, 2002	Socorro	LINEAR	NYS	1.9 km	MPC · JPL
166334	2002 JN_{107}	—	May 12, 2002	Palomar	NEAT	·	1.4 km	MPC · JPL
166335	2002 JR_{108}	—	May 6, 2002	Socorro	LINEAR	BAR	2.1 km	MPC · JPL
166336	2002 JN_{121}	—	May 5, 2002	Palomar	NEAT	ADE	3.7 km	MPC · JPL
166337	2002 JZ_{124}	—	May 6, 2002	Palomar	NEAT	·	1.6 km	MPC · JPL
166338	2002 JH_{125}	—	May 7, 2002	Palomar	NEAT	NYS	1.7 km	MPC · JPL
166339	2002 JX_{125}	—	May 7, 2002	Palomar	NEAT	·	1.4 km	MPC · JPL
166340	2002 JQ_{129}	—	May 8, 2002	Socorro	LINEAR	·	1.8 km	MPC · JPL
166341	2002 JV_{129}	—	May 8, 2002	Socorro	LINEAR	·	2.5 km	MPC · JPL
166342	2002 JV_{132}	—	May 9, 2002	Socorro	LINEAR	·	4.0 km	MPC · JPL
166343	2002 JB_{135}	—	May 9, 2002	Palomar	NEAT	·	2.2 km	MPC · JPL
166344	2002 JL_{139}	—	May 10, 2002	Palomar	NEAT	·	3.5 km	MPC · JPL
166345	2002 JU_{144}	—	May 13, 2002	Palomar	NEAT	·	2.2 km	MPC · JPL
166346	2002 JN_{145}	—	May 14, 2002	Palomar	NEAT	·	1.9 km	MPC · JPL
166347	2002 KQ_{1}	—	May 17, 2002	Palomar	NEAT	·	2.2 km	MPC · JPL
166348	2002 KD_{2}	—	May 18, 2002	Palomar	NEAT	·	3.2 km	MPC · JPL
166349 Rundell	2002 KO_{3}	Rundell	May 19, 2002	Needville	Needville	·	2.0 km	MPC · JPL
166350	2002 KH_{5}	—	May 16, 2002	Socorro	LINEAR	·	3.0 km	MPC · JPL
166351	2002 KP_{7}	—	May 28, 2002	Palomar	NEAT	L4	13 km	MPC · JPL
166352	2002 KN_{9}	—	May 27, 2002	Palomar	NEAT	·	3.9 km	MPC · JPL
166353	2002 KB_{10}	—	May 16, 2002	Socorro	LINEAR	·	1.5 km	MPC · JPL
166354	2002 KC_{10}	—	May 16, 2002	Socorro	LINEAR	·	2.3 km	MPC · JPL
166355	2002 KW_{10}	—	May 16, 2002	Socorro	LINEAR	·	1.8 km	MPC · JPL
166356	2002 KD_{14}	—	May 30, 2002	Palomar	NEAT	·	3.0 km	MPC · JPL
166357	2002 LW_{3}	—	June 5, 2002	Socorro	LINEAR	·	2.0 km	MPC · JPL
166358	2002 LZ_{6}	—	June 1, 2002	Palomar	NEAT	MAR	2.1 km	MPC · JPL
166359	2002 LJ_{15}	—	June 6, 2002	Socorro	LINEAR	·	1.6 km	MPC · JPL
166360	2002 LR_{15}	—	June 6, 2002	Socorro	LINEAR	·	3.1 km	MPC · JPL
166361	2002 LO_{16}	—	June 6, 2002	Socorro	LINEAR	·	2.3 km	MPC · JPL
166362	2002 LF_{17}	—	June 6, 2002	Socorro	LINEAR	EUN	1.9 km	MPC · JPL
166363	2002 LL_{22}	—	June 8, 2002	Socorro	LINEAR	(5)	4.0 km	MPC · JPL
166364	2002 LY_{24}	—	June 2, 2002	Palomar	NEAT	·	1.8 km	MPC · JPL
166365	2002 LZ_{24}	—	June 2, 2002	Palomar	NEAT	·	2.2 km	MPC · JPL
166366	2002 LH_{25}	—	June 3, 2002	Socorro	LINEAR	·	3.8 km	MPC · JPL
166367	2002 LF_{26}	—	June 6, 2002	Socorro	LINEAR	·	3.1 km	MPC · JPL
166368	2002 LC_{27}	—	June 7, 2002	Socorro	LINEAR	·	3.6 km	MPC · JPL
166369	2002 LM_{28}	—	June 9, 2002	Socorro	LINEAR	·	2.0 km	MPC · JPL
166370	2002 LG_{29}	—	June 9, 2002	Socorro	LINEAR	ADE ·	2.6 km	MPC · JPL
166371	2002 LL_{31}	—	June 10, 2002	Reedy Creek	J. Broughton	·	2.7 km	MPC · JPL
166372	2002 LO_{32}	—	June 11, 2002	Fountain Hills	C. W. Juels, P. R. Holvorcem	·	3.6 km	MPC · JPL
166373	2002 LX_{32}	—	June 3, 2002	Socorro	LINEAR	·	2.7 km	MPC · JPL
166374	2002 LG_{36}	—	June 9, 2002	Socorro	LINEAR	·	3.8 km	MPC · JPL
166375	2002 LS_{39}	—	June 10, 2002	Socorro	LINEAR	·	2.6 km	MPC · JPL
166376	2002 LU_{42}	—	June 10, 2002	Socorro	LINEAR	EUN	1.7 km	MPC · JPL
166377	2002 LC_{43}	—	June 10, 2002	Socorro	LINEAR	EUN	2.5 km	MPC · JPL
166378	2002 LX_{43}	—	June 10, 2002	Socorro	LINEAR	·	3.7 km	MPC · JPL
166379	2002 LF_{46}	—	June 11, 2002	Socorro	LINEAR	·	3.1 km	MPC · JPL
166380	2002 LG_{46}	—	June 11, 2002	Socorro	LINEAR	·	2.5 km	MPC · JPL
166381	2002 LT_{46}	—	June 12, 2002	Socorro	LINEAR	·	3.3 km	MPC · JPL
166382	2002 LA_{50}	—	June 8, 2002	Socorro	LINEAR	·	2.2 km	MPC · JPL
166383	2002 LN_{50}	—	June 6, 2002	Socorro	LINEAR	·	4.2 km	MPC · JPL
166384	2002 LS_{57}	—	June 11, 2002	Palomar	NEAT	BRG	2.6 km	MPC · JPL
166385	2002 MX_{2}	—	June 24, 2002	Haleakala	NEAT	·	6.2 km	MPC · JPL
166386	2002 NO_{4}	—	July 8, 2002	Kleť	Kleť	·	1.7 km	MPC · JPL
166387	2002 NU_{4}	—	July 10, 2002	Campo Imperatore	CINEOS	WIT	1.7 km	MPC · JPL
166388	2002 NC_{5}	—	July 10, 2002	Campo Imperatore	CINEOS	·	2.5 km	MPC · JPL
166389	2002 NK_{8}	—	July 9, 2002	Socorro	LINEAR	·	3.0 km	MPC · JPL
166390	2002 NE_{9}	—	July 1, 2002	Palomar	NEAT	·	2.6 km	MPC · JPL
166391	2002 NA_{10}	—	July 3, 2002	Palomar	NEAT	·	3.7 km	MPC · JPL
166392	2002 ND_{13}	—	July 4, 2002	Palomar	NEAT	·	3.4 km	MPC · JPL
166393	2002 NM_{14}	—	July 3, 2002	Palomar	NEAT	·	2.9 km	MPC · JPL
166394	2002 NB_{15}	—	July 5, 2002	Socorro	LINEAR	·	5.6 km	MPC · JPL
166395	2002 NW_{17}	—	July 9, 2002	Socorro	LINEAR	·	3.6 km	MPC · JPL
166396	2002 NA_{21}	—	July 9, 2002	Socorro	LINEAR	MAR	2.1 km	MPC · JPL
166397	2002 NG_{21}	—	July 9, 2002	Socorro	LINEAR	ADE	3.7 km	MPC · JPL
166398	2002 NX_{22}	—	July 9, 2002	Socorro	LINEAR	·	5.0 km	MPC · JPL
166399	2002 NY_{22}	—	July 9, 2002	Socorro	LINEAR	ADE	5.0 km	MPC · JPL
166400	2002 NS_{23}	—	July 9, 2002	Socorro	LINEAR	·	2.2 km	MPC · JPL

== 166401–166500 ==
back to top

Designation			Discovery			Properties		Ref
Permanent	Provisional	Named after	Date	Site	Discoverer(s)	Category	Diam.	Ref
166401	2002 NG_{24}	—	July 9, 2002	Socorro	LINEAR	·	3.6 km	MPC · JPL
166402	2002 NV_{29}	—	July 4, 2002	Kitt Peak	Spacewatch	·	3.1 km	MPC · JPL
166403	2002 NQ_{31}	—	July 9, 2002	Palomar	NEAT	·	4.0 km	MPC · JPL
166404	2002 NP_{41}	—	July 14, 2002	Palomar	NEAT	·	3.2 km	MPC · JPL
166405	2002 NB_{45}	—	July 12, 2002	Palomar	NEAT	·	2.8 km	MPC · JPL
166406	2002 NZ_{51}	—	July 14, 2002	Socorro	LINEAR	·	4.2 km	MPC · JPL
166407	2002 NC_{53}	—	July 14, 2002	Palomar	NEAT	·	3.3 km	MPC · JPL
166408	2002 NU_{61}	—	July 4, 2002	Palomar	NEAT	MIS	3.3 km	MPC · JPL
166409	2002 OP	—	July 17, 2002	Socorro	LINEAR	·	2.3 km	MPC · JPL
166410	2002 OT_{1}	—	July 17, 2002	Socorro	LINEAR	·	2.6 km	MPC · JPL
166411	2002 OV_{1}	—	July 17, 2002	Socorro	LINEAR	·	4.0 km	MPC · JPL
166412	2002 OL_{2}	—	July 17, 2002	Socorro	LINEAR	·	3.2 km	MPC · JPL
166413	2002 OG_{6}	—	July 20, 2002	Palomar	NEAT	·	3.4 km	MPC · JPL
166414	2002 OF_{16}	—	July 18, 2002	Socorro	LINEAR	·	2.4 km	MPC · JPL
166415	2002 OQ_{16}	—	July 18, 2002	Socorro	LINEAR	·	2.8 km	MPC · JPL
166416	2002 OY_{16}	—	July 18, 2002	Socorro	LINEAR	·	4.3 km	MPC · JPL
166417	2002 OO_{17}	—	July 18, 2002	Socorro	LINEAR	·	2.1 km	MPC · JPL
166418	2002 OP_{18}	—	July 18, 2002	Socorro	LINEAR	ADE	4.1 km	MPC · JPL
166419	2002 OA_{25}	—	July 29, 2002	Palomar	S. F. Hönig	·	1.8 km	MPC · JPL
166420	2002 OH_{26}	—	July 23, 2002	Palomar	NEAT	GEF	2.2 km	MPC · JPL
166421	2002 OB_{27}	—	July 22, 2002	Palomar	NEAT	·	2.3 km	MPC · JPL
166422	2002 PS_{1}	—	August 5, 2002	Emerald Lane	L. Ball	·	5.4 km	MPC · JPL
166423	2002 PZ_{1}	—	August 5, 2002	Reedy Creek	J. Broughton	DOR	4.9 km	MPC · JPL
166424	2002 PX_{7}	—	August 3, 2002	Palomar	NEAT	·	2.3 km	MPC · JPL
166425	2002 PE_{8}	—	August 4, 2002	Palomar	NEAT	·	2.3 km	MPC · JPL
166426	2002 PZ_{9}	—	August 5, 2002	Palomar	NEAT	·	4.4 km	MPC · JPL
166427	2002 PZ_{15}	—	August 6, 2002	Palomar	NEAT	·	2.7 km	MPC · JPL
166428	2002 PY_{22}	—	August 6, 2002	Palomar	NEAT	NEM	3.8 km	MPC · JPL
166429	2002 PJ_{23}	—	August 6, 2002	Palomar	NEAT	GEF	1.7 km	MPC · JPL
166430	2002 PS_{23}	—	August 6, 2002	Palomar	NEAT	·	2.7 km	MPC · JPL
166431	2002 PF_{24}	—	August 6, 2002	Palomar	NEAT	AGN	1.8 km	MPC · JPL
166432	2002 PG_{24}	—	August 6, 2002	Palomar	NEAT	·	1.6 km	MPC · JPL
166433	2002 PX_{30}	—	August 6, 2002	Palomar	NEAT	·	2.8 km	MPC · JPL
166434	2002 PD_{31}	—	August 6, 2002	Palomar	NEAT	·	3.5 km	MPC · JPL
166435	2002 PY_{32}	—	August 6, 2002	Palomar	NEAT	GEF	1.9 km	MPC · JPL
166436	2002 PA_{33}	—	August 6, 2002	Palomar	NEAT	·	3.3 km	MPC · JPL
166437	2002 PE_{33}	—	August 5, 2002	Campo Imperatore	CINEOS	·	4.3 km	MPC · JPL
166438	2002 PD_{34}	—	August 6, 2002	Campo Imperatore	CINEOS	·	4.1 km	MPC · JPL
166439	2002 PP_{35}	—	August 6, 2002	Palomar	NEAT	AGN	2.1 km	MPC · JPL
166440	2002 PH_{43}	—	August 8, 2002	Palomar	NEAT	·	2.7 km	MPC · JPL
166441	2002 PA_{51}	—	August 7, 2002	Palomar	NEAT	WIT	1.7 km	MPC · JPL
166442	2002 PR_{51}	—	August 8, 2002	Palomar	NEAT	·	2.5 km	MPC · JPL
166443	2002 PE_{52}	—	August 8, 2002	Palomar	NEAT	·	2.7 km	MPC · JPL
166444 Lange	2002 PJ_{54}	Lange	August 11, 2002	Needville	J. Dellinger, W. G. Dillon	·	5.0 km	MPC · JPL
166445	2002 PR_{55}	—	August 9, 2002	Socorro	LINEAR	·	3.4 km	MPC · JPL
166446	2002 PF_{58}	—	August 10, 2002	Socorro	LINEAR	HNS	2.2 km	MPC · JPL
166447	2002 PO_{58}	—	August 10, 2002	Socorro	LINEAR	·	5.2 km	MPC · JPL
166448	2002 PU_{69}	—	August 11, 2002	Socorro	LINEAR	·	6.5 km	MPC · JPL
166449	2002 PD_{70}	—	August 11, 2002	Socorro	LINEAR	·	4.0 km	MPC · JPL
166450	2002 PP_{72}	—	August 12, 2002	Socorro	LINEAR	·	2.9 km	MPC · JPL
166451	2002 PT_{72}	—	August 12, 2002	Socorro	LINEAR	·	2.6 km	MPC · JPL
166452	2002 PF_{74}	—	August 12, 2002	Socorro	LINEAR	EUN	1.9 km	MPC · JPL
166453	2002 PV_{75}	—	August 8, 2002	Palomar	NEAT	·	2.4 km	MPC · JPL
166454	2002 PC_{76}	—	August 8, 2002	Palomar	NEAT	·	2.7 km	MPC · JPL
166455	2002 PG_{77}	—	August 11, 2002	Palomar	NEAT	·	3.4 km	MPC · JPL
166456	2002 PQ_{77}	—	August 11, 2002	Haleakala	NEAT	·	3.3 km	MPC · JPL
166457	2002 PR_{80}	—	August 11, 2002	Palomar	NEAT	DOR	4.1 km	MPC · JPL
166458	2002 PA_{82}	—	August 9, 2002	Socorro	LINEAR	EUN	2.5 km	MPC · JPL
166459	2002 PL_{89}	—	August 11, 2002	Socorro	LINEAR	·	4.4 km	MPC · JPL
166460	2002 PC_{90}	—	August 11, 2002	Socorro	LINEAR	·	3.5 km	MPC · JPL
166461	2002 PL_{90}	—	August 11, 2002	Socorro	LINEAR	ADE	3.9 km	MPC · JPL
166462	2002 PX_{92}	—	August 14, 2002	Palomar	NEAT	·	3.8 km	MPC · JPL
166463	2002 PH_{93}	—	August 14, 2002	Palomar	NEAT	·	5.3 km	MPC · JPL
166464	2002 PQ_{96}	—	August 14, 2002	Socorro	LINEAR	·	3.0 km	MPC · JPL
166465	2002 PH_{98}	—	August 14, 2002	Socorro	LINEAR	·	3.8 km	MPC · JPL
166466	2002 PJ_{99}	—	August 14, 2002	Socorro	LINEAR	JUN	1.9 km	MPC · JPL
166467	2002 PR_{100}	—	August 11, 2002	Palomar	NEAT	·	2.6 km	MPC · JPL
166468	2002 PP_{101}	—	August 12, 2002	Socorro	LINEAR	·	2.7 km	MPC · JPL
166469	2002 PV_{107}	—	August 13, 2002	Socorro	LINEAR	·	3.6 km	MPC · JPL
166470	2002 PW_{108}	—	August 13, 2002	Socorro	LINEAR	·	1.9 km	MPC · JPL
166471	2002 PE_{109}	—	August 13, 2002	Socorro	LINEAR	WIT	1.6 km	MPC · JPL
166472	2002 PG_{116}	—	August 13, 2002	Socorro	LINEAR	BRA	2.8 km	MPC · JPL
166473	2002 PL_{117}	—	August 15, 2002	Socorro	LINEAR	·	2.9 km	MPC · JPL
166474	2002 PD_{119}	—	August 13, 2002	Anderson Mesa	LONEOS	·	4.5 km	MPC · JPL
166475	2002 PW_{119}	—	August 13, 2002	Anderson Mesa	LONEOS	·	3.4 km	MPC · JPL
166476	2002 PM_{121}	—	August 13, 2002	Anderson Mesa	LONEOS	DOR	3.5 km	MPC · JPL
166477	2002 PD_{128}	—	August 14, 2002	Socorro	LINEAR	·	3.0 km	MPC · JPL
166478	2002 PV_{128}	—	August 14, 2002	Socorro	LINEAR	TIR	5.6 km	MPC · JPL
166479	2002 PX_{131}	—	August 13, 2002	Kitt Peak	Spacewatch	·	2.8 km	MPC · JPL
166480	2002 PZ_{131}	—	August 13, 2002	Anderson Mesa	LONEOS	·	3.2 km	MPC · JPL
166481	2002 PP_{136}	—	August 15, 2002	Anderson Mesa	LONEOS	·	3.2 km	MPC · JPL
166482	2002 PY_{137}	—	August 15, 2002	Socorro	LINEAR	PAD	4.6 km	MPC · JPL
166483	2002 PC_{138}	—	August 15, 2002	Kitt Peak	Spacewatch	·	3.2 km	MPC · JPL
166484	2002 PT_{138}	—	August 11, 2002	Haleakala	NEAT	·	3.1 km	MPC · JPL
166485	2002 PA_{141}	—	August 14, 2002	Siding Spring	R. H. McNaught	·	5.1 km	MPC · JPL
166486	2002 PM_{150}	—	August 6, 2002	Palomar	NEAT	·	3.9 km	MPC · JPL
166487	2002 PG_{157}	—	August 8, 2002	Palomar	S. F. Hönig	·	4.1 km	MPC · JPL
166488	2002 PO_{158}	—	August 8, 2002	Palomar	S. F. Hönig	·	3.1 km	MPC · JPL
166489	2002 PS_{158}	—	August 8, 2002	Palomar	S. F. Hönig	·	3.1 km	MPC · JPL
166490	2002 PH_{159}	—	August 8, 2002	Palomar	S. F. Hönig	AGN	1.8 km	MPC · JPL
166491	2002 PQ_{161}	—	August 8, 2002	Palomar	S. F. Hönig	AGN	1.5 km	MPC · JPL
166492	2002 PX_{162}	—	August 8, 2002	Palomar	S. F. Hönig	AST	3.1 km	MPC · JPL
166493	2002 PV_{168}	—	August 8, 2002	Palomar	NEAT	·	1.9 km	MPC · JPL
166494	2002 PT_{171}	—	August 8, 2002	Palomar	NEAT	·	3.0 km	MPC · JPL
166495	2002 PH_{172}	—	August 8, 2002	Palomar	NEAT	·	2.6 km	MPC · JPL
166496	2002 PV_{172}	—	August 11, 2002	Palomar	NEAT	AST	1.8 km	MPC · JPL
166497	2002 QB_{5}	—	August 16, 2002	Palomar	NEAT	·	3.6 km	MPC · JPL
166498	2002 QT_{8}	—	August 19, 2002	Palomar	NEAT	·	4.1 km	MPC · JPL
166499	2002 QB_{13}	—	August 26, 2002	Palomar	NEAT	·	3.5 km	MPC · JPL
166500	2002 QD_{17}	—	August 27, 2002	Palomar	NEAT	EMA	6.7 km	MPC · JPL

== 166501–166600 ==
back to top

Designation			Discovery			Properties		Ref
Permanent	Provisional	Named after	Date	Site	Discoverer(s)	Category	Diam.	Ref
166501	2002 QM_{19}	—	August 26, 2002	Palomar	NEAT	AGN	2.3 km	MPC · JPL
166502	2002 QO_{19}	—	August 26, 2002	Palomar	NEAT	·	4.5 km	MPC · JPL
166503	2002 QS_{19}	—	August 27, 2002	Palomar	NEAT	·	3.5 km	MPC · JPL
166504	2002 QY_{20}	—	August 28, 2002	Palomar	NEAT	KOR	2.5 km	MPC · JPL
166505	2002 QU_{22}	—	August 27, 2002	Palomar	NEAT	PAD	5.2 km	MPC · JPL
166506	2002 QD_{33}	—	August 29, 2002	Palomar	NEAT	·	3.3 km	MPC · JPL
166507	2002 QV_{33}	—	August 29, 2002	Palomar	NEAT	·	2.8 km	MPC · JPL
166508	2002 QD_{35}	—	August 29, 2002	Palomar	NEAT	WIT	1.9 km	MPC · JPL
166509	2002 QO_{35}	—	August 29, 2002	Palomar	NEAT	·	3.4 km	MPC · JPL
166510	2002 QR_{35}	—	August 29, 2002	Palomar	NEAT	·	2.9 km	MPC · JPL
166511	2002 QB_{41}	—	August 29, 2002	Palomar	NEAT	(5)	1.5 km	MPC · JPL
166512	2002 QL_{42}	—	August 30, 2002	Palomar	NEAT	·	2.8 km	MPC · JPL
166513	2002 QS_{45}	—	August 31, 2002	Kitt Peak	Spacewatch	·	3.0 km	MPC · JPL
166514	2002 QZ_{56}	—	August 29, 2002	Palomar	S. F. Hönig	KOR	1.9 km	MPC · JPL
166515	2002 QY_{61}	—	August 28, 2002	Palomar	NEAT	·	2.4 km	MPC · JPL
166516	2002 QF_{62}	—	August 27, 2002	Palomar	NEAT	AEO	1.6 km	MPC · JPL
166517	2002 QO_{65}	—	August 17, 2002	Palomar	NEAT	EOS	3.2 km	MPC · JPL
166518	2002 QR_{72}	—	August 19, 2002	Palomar	NEAT	KOR	1.8 km	MPC · JPL
166519	2002 QR_{75}	—	August 18, 2002	Palomar	NEAT	HOF	4.3 km	MPC · JPL
166520	2002 QY_{76}	—	August 16, 2002	Palomar	NEAT	·	3.2 km	MPC · JPL
166521	2002 QE_{77}	—	August 18, 2002	Palomar	NEAT	·	3.1 km	MPC · JPL
166522	2002 QE_{87}	—	August 19, 2002	Palomar	NEAT	·	4.1 km	MPC · JPL
166523	2002 QG_{101}	—	August 18, 2002	Palomar	NEAT	(12739)	2.6 km	MPC · JPL
166524	2002 QL_{101}	—	August 19, 2002	Palomar	NEAT	·	4.4 km	MPC · JPL
166525	2002 QB_{109}	—	August 17, 2002	Palomar	NEAT	AGN	1.7 km	MPC · JPL
166526	2002 RK	—	September 2, 2002	Ondřejov	P. Kušnirák, P. Pravec	AGN	1.8 km	MPC · JPL
166527	2002 RN_{3}	—	September 1, 2002	Palomar	NEAT	·	3.3 km	MPC · JPL
166528	2002 RV_{3}	—	September 1, 2002	Kvistaberg	Uppsala-DLR Asteroid Survey	·	3.3 km	MPC · JPL
166529	2002 RB_{8}	—	September 3, 2002	Haleakala	NEAT	GEF	2.4 km	MPC · JPL
166530	2002 RY_{8}	—	September 4, 2002	Palomar	NEAT	AST	5.0 km	MPC · JPL
166531	2002 RL_{10}	—	September 4, 2002	Palomar	NEAT	·	2.5 km	MPC · JPL
166532	2002 RN_{11}	—	September 4, 2002	Nashville	Clingan, R.	·	3.0 km	MPC · JPL
166533	2002 RP_{16}	—	September 4, 2002	Anderson Mesa	LONEOS	·	4.8 km	MPC · JPL
166534	2002 RT_{20}	—	September 4, 2002	Anderson Mesa	LONEOS	EOS	4.2 km	MPC · JPL
166535	2002 RU_{21}	—	September 4, 2002	Anderson Mesa	LONEOS	·	4.4 km	MPC · JPL
166536	2002 RX_{23}	—	September 4, 2002	Anderson Mesa	LONEOS	·	2.7 km	MPC · JPL
166537	2002 RO_{27}	—	September 4, 2002	Ondřejov	P. Kušnirák	AGN	1.7 km	MPC · JPL
166538	2002 RU_{30}	—	September 4, 2002	Anderson Mesa	LONEOS	GEF	2.5 km	MPC · JPL
166539	2002 RH_{32}	—	September 4, 2002	Anderson Mesa	LONEOS	·	3.9 km	MPC · JPL
166540	2002 RF_{34}	—	September 4, 2002	Anderson Mesa	LONEOS	EOS ·	6.1 km	MPC · JPL
166541	2002 RM_{37}	—	September 5, 2002	Anderson Mesa	LONEOS	·	4.9 km	MPC · JPL
166542	2002 RU_{40}	—	September 5, 2002	Socorro	LINEAR	·	3.6 km	MPC · JPL
166543	2002 RR_{41}	—	September 5, 2002	Socorro	LINEAR	·	3.5 km	MPC · JPL
166544	2002 RL_{45}	—	September 5, 2002	Socorro	LINEAR	·	2.5 km	MPC · JPL
166545	2002 RJ_{52}	—	September 5, 2002	Socorro	LINEAR	·	2.9 km	MPC · JPL
166546	2002 RJ_{56}	—	September 5, 2002	Anderson Mesa	LONEOS	·	2.9 km	MPC · JPL
166547	2002 RL_{57}	—	September 5, 2002	Anderson Mesa	LONEOS	MRX	1.9 km	MPC · JPL
166548	2002 RF_{58}	—	September 5, 2002	Anderson Mesa	LONEOS	·	3.5 km	MPC · JPL
166549	2002 RT_{60}	—	September 5, 2002	Anderson Mesa	LONEOS	·	4.5 km	MPC · JPL
166550	2002 RW_{66}	—	September 3, 2002	Palomar	NEAT	DOR	6.4 km	MPC · JPL
166551	2002 RH_{68}	—	September 4, 2002	Anderson Mesa	LONEOS	·	3.9 km	MPC · JPL
166552	2002 RY_{73}	—	September 5, 2002	Socorro	LINEAR	KOR	2.6 km	MPC · JPL
166553	2002 RL_{86}	—	September 5, 2002	Socorro	LINEAR	H	810 m	MPC · JPL
166554	2002 RP_{88}	—	September 5, 2002	Socorro	LINEAR	·	3.1 km	MPC · JPL
166555	2002 RY_{89}	—	September 5, 2002	Socorro	LINEAR	·	3.4 km	MPC · JPL
166556	2002 RC_{94}	—	September 5, 2002	Socorro	LINEAR	·	4.0 km	MPC · JPL
166557	2002 RH_{97}	—	September 5, 2002	Anderson Mesa	LONEOS	·	2.3 km	MPC · JPL
166558	2002 RB_{99}	—	September 5, 2002	Socorro	LINEAR	H	660 m	MPC · JPL
166559	2002 RE_{100}	—	September 5, 2002	Socorro	LINEAR	TIR	3.7 km	MPC · JPL
166560	2002 RP_{102}	—	September 5, 2002	Socorro	LINEAR	·	4.0 km	MPC · JPL
166561	2002 RY_{103}	—	September 5, 2002	Socorro	LINEAR	·	7.8 km	MPC · JPL
166562	2002 RL_{104}	—	September 5, 2002	Socorro	LINEAR	·	5.9 km	MPC · JPL
166563	2002 RS_{104}	—	September 5, 2002	Socorro	LINEAR	·	4.8 km	MPC · JPL
166564	2002 RB_{107}	—	September 5, 2002	Socorro	LINEAR	T_{j} (2.97)	7.7 km	MPC · JPL
166565	2002 RE_{109}	—	September 6, 2002	Socorro	LINEAR	·	3.1 km	MPC · JPL
166566	2002 RQ_{110}	—	September 6, 2002	Socorro	LINEAR	·	4.3 km	MPC · JPL
166567	2002 RF_{113}	—	September 5, 2002	Anderson Mesa	LONEOS	KOR	2.3 km	MPC · JPL
166568	2002 RH_{114}	—	September 5, 2002	Socorro	LINEAR	PAD	4.1 km	MPC · JPL
166569	2002 RH_{115}	—	September 6, 2002	Socorro	LINEAR	PAD	5.1 km	MPC · JPL
166570 Adolfträger	2002 RG_{118}	Adolfträger	September 8, 2002	Kleť	KLENOT	·	6.7 km	MPC · JPL
166571	2002 RF_{120}	—	September 3, 2002	Campo Imperatore	CINEOS	MRX	1.7 km	MPC · JPL
166572	2002 RU_{120}	—	September 7, 2002	Socorro	LINEAR	·	4.4 km	MPC · JPL
166573	2002 RE_{123}	—	September 8, 2002	Haleakala	NEAT	·	3.6 km	MPC · JPL
166574	2002 RD_{127}	—	September 10, 2002	Palomar	NEAT	·	3.4 km	MPC · JPL
166575	2002 RV_{127}	—	September 10, 2002	Palomar	NEAT	slow	2.8 km	MPC · JPL
166576	2002 RA_{129}	—	September 10, 2002	Haleakala	NEAT	·	3.5 km	MPC · JPL
166577	2002 RO_{134}	—	September 10, 2002	Palomar	NEAT	NAE	5.9 km	MPC · JPL
166578	2002 RR_{134}	—	September 10, 2002	Palomar	NEAT	EOS	3.2 km	MPC · JPL
166579	2002 RR_{135}	—	September 10, 2002	Palomar	NEAT	·	3.6 km	MPC · JPL
166580	2002 RK_{136}	—	September 11, 2002	Haleakala	NEAT	·	3.8 km	MPC · JPL
166581	2002 RX_{140}	—	September 10, 2002	Palomar	NEAT	EUN	2.2 km	MPC · JPL
166582	2002 RP_{149}	—	September 11, 2002	Haleakala	NEAT	KOR	1.9 km	MPC · JPL
166583	2002 RB_{150}	—	September 11, 2002	Haleakala	NEAT	·	3.8 km	MPC · JPL
166584	2002 RB_{156}	—	September 11, 2002	Palomar	NEAT	·	2.3 km	MPC · JPL
166585	2002 RP_{158}	—	September 11, 2002	Palomar	NEAT	·	3.3 km	MPC · JPL
166586	2002 RO_{160}	—	September 12, 2002	Palomar	NEAT	·	2.3 km	MPC · JPL
166587	2002 RS_{160}	—	September 12, 2002	Palomar	NEAT	·	2.4 km	MPC · JPL
166588	2002 RY_{161}	—	September 12, 2002	Palomar	NEAT	·	2.2 km	MPC · JPL
166589	2002 RG_{165}	—	September 12, 2002	Palomar	NEAT	·	3.4 km	MPC · JPL
166590	2002 RV_{167}	—	September 13, 2002	Palomar	NEAT	KOR	2.1 km	MPC · JPL
166591	2002 RZ_{167}	—	September 13, 2002	Palomar	NEAT	·	3.0 km	MPC · JPL
166592	2002 RS_{171}	—	September 13, 2002	Socorro	LINEAR	DOR	4.8 km	MPC · JPL
166593	2002 RO_{173}	—	September 13, 2002	Kitt Peak	Spacewatch	·	3.7 km	MPC · JPL
166594	2002 RQ_{173}	—	September 13, 2002	Kitt Peak	Spacewatch	·	3.4 km	MPC · JPL
166595	2002 RE_{179}	—	September 14, 2002	Kitt Peak	Spacewatch	KOR	2.3 km	MPC · JPL
166596	2002 RG_{179}	—	September 14, 2002	Kitt Peak	Spacewatch	·	2.5 km	MPC · JPL
166597	2002 RA_{184}	—	September 12, 2002	Palomar	NEAT	·	4.2 km	MPC · JPL
166598	2002 RW_{196}	—	September 12, 2002	Haleakala	NEAT	GEF	2.7 km	MPC · JPL
166599	2002 RY_{199}	—	September 13, 2002	Palomar	NEAT	·	4.0 km	MPC · JPL
166600	2002 RZ_{206}	—	September 14, 2002	Palomar	NEAT	·	3.0 km	MPC · JPL

== 166601–166700 ==
back to top

Designation			Discovery			Properties		Ref
Permanent	Provisional	Named after	Date	Site	Discoverer(s)	Category	Diam.	Ref
166601	2002 RR_{208}	—	September 13, 2002	Kitt Peak	Spacewatch	·	2.3 km	MPC · JPL
166602	2002 RO_{209}	—	September 14, 2002	Haleakala	NEAT	·	2.6 km	MPC · JPL
166603	2002 RY_{212}	—	September 12, 2002	Palomar	NEAT	·	2.2 km	MPC · JPL
166604	2002 RJ_{217}	—	September 14, 2002	Palomar	NEAT	·	2.6 km	MPC · JPL
166605	2002 RK_{220}	—	September 15, 2002	Palomar	NEAT	·	3.3 km	MPC · JPL
166606	2002 RQ_{227}	—	September 14, 2002	Palomar	NEAT	·	2.2 km	MPC · JPL
166607	2002 RF_{229}	—	September 14, 2002	Haleakala	NEAT	NAE	5.6 km	MPC · JPL
166608	2002 RS_{231}	—	September 14, 2002	Palomar	NEAT	HOF	4.7 km	MPC · JPL
166609	2002 RF_{232}	—	September 10, 2002	Wrightwood	Wrightwood	EOS	2.6 km	MPC · JPL
166610	2002 RC_{234}	—	September 14, 2002	Palomar	R. Matson	·	2.1 km	MPC · JPL
166611	2002 RT_{239}	—	September 1, 2002	Palomar	S. F. Hönig	·	2.2 km	MPC · JPL
166612	2002 RZ_{243}	—	September 14, 2002	Palomar	NEAT	·	3.2 km	MPC · JPL
166613	2002 RA_{244}	—	September 14, 2002	Palomar	NEAT	AGN	2.1 km	MPC · JPL
166614 Zsazsa	2002 RG_{250}	Zsazsa	September 1, 2002	Palomar	NEAT	·	2.3 km	MPC · JPL
166615	2002 RZ_{268}	—	September 4, 2002	Palomar	NEAT	·	2.2 km	MPC · JPL
166616	2002 RE_{275}	—	September 4, 2002	Palomar	NEAT	·	4.7 km	MPC · JPL
166617	2002 SN_{2}	—	September 26, 2002	Palomar	NEAT	·	2.7 km	MPC · JPL
166618	2002 SF_{5}	—	September 27, 2002	Palomar	NEAT	EOS	3.0 km	MPC · JPL
166619	2002 SA_{7}	—	September 27, 2002	Palomar	NEAT	MRX	2.5 km	MPC · JPL
166620	2002 SG_{7}	—	September 27, 2002	Palomar	NEAT	KOR	2.3 km	MPC · JPL
166621	2002 SQ_{10}	—	September 27, 2002	Palomar	NEAT	·	4.1 km	MPC · JPL
166622 Sébastien	2002 SR_{15}	Sébastien	September 27, 2002	Palomar	NEAT	·	4.3 km	MPC · JPL
166623	2002 SQ_{17}	—	September 26, 2002	Palomar	NEAT	·	6.0 km	MPC · JPL
166624	2002 SU_{17}	—	September 26, 2002	Palomar	NEAT	KOR	2.0 km	MPC · JPL
166625	2002 SM_{20}	—	September 26, 2002	Palomar	NEAT	·	2.6 km	MPC · JPL
166626	2002 SL_{21}	—	September 26, 2002	Palomar	NEAT	·	4.0 km	MPC · JPL
166627	2002 SO_{21}	—	September 26, 2002	Palomar	NEAT	DOR	4.1 km	MPC · JPL
166628	2002 SS_{22}	—	September 26, 2002	Haleakala	NEAT	·	3.2 km	MPC · JPL
166629	2002 SN_{24}	—	September 28, 2002	Palomar	NEAT	KOR	2.7 km	MPC · JPL
166630	2002 SW_{25}	—	September 28, 2002	Haleakala	NEAT	VER	5.4 km	MPC · JPL
166631	2002 SB_{26}	—	September 28, 2002	Haleakala	NEAT	fast	4.0 km	MPC · JPL
166632	2002 SP_{30}	—	September 28, 2002	Haleakala	NEAT	·	6.3 km	MPC · JPL
166633	2002 SB_{32}	—	September 28, 2002	Haleakala	NEAT	·	3.1 km	MPC · JPL
166634	2002 SR_{32}	—	September 28, 2002	Haleakala	NEAT	·	4.8 km	MPC · JPL
166635	2002 SD_{34}	—	September 29, 2002	Haleakala	NEAT	·	2.3 km	MPC · JPL
166636	2002 SZ_{38}	—	September 30, 2002	Socorro	LINEAR	HOF · fast	4.9 km	MPC · JPL
166637	2002 SU_{40}	—	September 30, 2002	Haleakala	NEAT	·	4.9 km	MPC · JPL
166638	2002 SJ_{46}	—	September 29, 2002	Haleakala	NEAT	·	3.2 km	MPC · JPL
166639	2002 SK_{46}	—	September 29, 2002	Haleakala	NEAT	·	6.8 km	MPC · JPL
166640	2002 SV_{49}	—	September 30, 2002	Socorro	LINEAR	TEL	2.7 km	MPC · JPL
166641	2002 SF_{55}	—	September 30, 2002	Socorro	LINEAR	·	5.1 km	MPC · JPL
166642	2002 SF_{56}	—	September 30, 2002	Socorro	LINEAR	·	3.4 km	MPC · JPL
166643	2002 SN_{56}	—	September 30, 2002	Socorro	LINEAR	TEL	2.7 km	MPC · JPL
166644	2002 SW_{58}	—	September 30, 2002	Socorro	LINEAR	THM	3.2 km	MPC · JPL
166645	2002 TV_{1}	—	October 1, 2002	Anderson Mesa	LONEOS	·	6.8 km	MPC · JPL
166646	2002 TJ_{4}	—	October 1, 2002	Anderson Mesa	LONEOS	LIX	6.7 km	MPC · JPL
166647	2002 TM_{6}	—	October 1, 2002	Anderson Mesa	LONEOS	KOR	2.9 km	MPC · JPL
166648	2002 TQ_{7}	—	October 1, 2002	Haleakala	NEAT	AGN · fast	2.4 km	MPC · JPL
166649	2002 TB_{11}	—	October 1, 2002	Anderson Mesa	LONEOS	AGN	2.1 km	MPC · JPL
166650	2002 TN_{14}	—	October 1, 2002	Anderson Mesa	LONEOS	·	3.2 km	MPC · JPL
166651	2002 TK_{16}	—	October 2, 2002	Socorro	LINEAR	HOF	4.2 km	MPC · JPL
166652	2002 TX_{18}	—	October 2, 2002	Socorro	LINEAR	HOF	5.4 km	MPC · JPL
166653	2002 TT_{20}	—	October 2, 2002	Socorro	LINEAR	KOR	1.7 km	MPC · JPL
166654	2002 TO_{23}	—	October 2, 2002	Socorro	LINEAR	·	6.1 km	MPC · JPL
166655	2002 TS_{23}	—	October 2, 2002	Socorro	LINEAR	KOR	2.5 km	MPC · JPL
166656	2002 TX_{23}	—	October 2, 2002	Socorro	LINEAR	THM	2.9 km	MPC · JPL
166657	2002 TV_{24}	—	October 2, 2002	Socorro	LINEAR	·	3.7 km	MPC · JPL
166658	2002 TG_{28}	—	October 2, 2002	Socorro	LINEAR	·	4.1 km	MPC · JPL
166659	2002 TS_{33}	—	October 2, 2002	Socorro	LINEAR	·	3.0 km	MPC · JPL
166660	2002 TT_{33}	—	October 2, 2002	Socorro	LINEAR	KOR	1.9 km	MPC · JPL
166661	2002 TX_{37}	—	October 2, 2002	Socorro	LINEAR	BRA	4.1 km	MPC · JPL
166662	2002 TL_{44}	—	October 2, 2002	Haleakala	NEAT	·	3.3 km	MPC · JPL
166663	2002 TO_{46}	—	October 2, 2002	Socorro	LINEAR	·	2.8 km	MPC · JPL
166664	2002 TH_{49}	—	October 2, 2002	Socorro	LINEAR	EOS	3.4 km	MPC · JPL
166665	2002 TB_{56}	—	October 1, 2002	Anderson Mesa	LONEOS	615	2.4 km	MPC · JPL
166666	2002 TN_{57}	—	October 2, 2002	Socorro	LINEAR	·	3.5 km	MPC · JPL
166667	2002 TU_{57}	—	October 2, 2002	Campo Imperatore	CINEOS	·	2.9 km	MPC · JPL
166668	2002 TM_{58}	—	October 1, 2002	Anderson Mesa	LONEOS	·	4.3 km	MPC · JPL
166669	2002 TQ_{61}	—	October 3, 2002	Campo Imperatore	CINEOS	GEF	2.4 km	MPC · JPL
166670	2002 TY_{63}	—	October 4, 2002	Socorro	LINEAR	·	6.1 km	MPC · JPL
166671	2002 TP_{72}	—	October 3, 2002	Palomar	NEAT	HYG	4.7 km	MPC · JPL
166672	2002 TM_{77}	—	October 1, 2002	Anderson Mesa	LONEOS	·	3.9 km	MPC · JPL
166673	2002 TZ_{79}	—	October 1, 2002	Socorro	LINEAR	·	6.1 km	MPC · JPL
166674	2002 TR_{84}	—	October 2, 2002	Haleakala	NEAT	EOS	3.4 km	MPC · JPL
166675	2002 TD_{86}	—	October 2, 2002	Campo Imperatore	CINEOS	·	3.3 km	MPC · JPL
166676	2002 TO_{92}	—	October 3, 2002	Socorro	LINEAR	·	2.7 km	MPC · JPL
166677	2002 TH_{99}	—	October 3, 2002	Campo Imperatore	CINEOS	·	5.3 km	MPC · JPL
166678	2002 TY_{107}	—	October 1, 2002	Anderson Mesa	LONEOS	·	5.4 km	MPC · JPL
166679	2002 TS_{109}	—	October 2, 2002	Haleakala	NEAT	·	2.8 km	MPC · JPL
166680	2002 TN_{110}	—	October 2, 2002	Haleakala	NEAT	·	6.3 km	MPC · JPL
166681	2002 TZ_{111}	—	October 3, 2002	Socorro	LINEAR	EOS	2.8 km	MPC · JPL
166682	2002 TM_{112}	—	October 3, 2002	Socorro	LINEAR	KOR	3.1 km	MPC · JPL
166683	2002 TN_{114}	—	October 3, 2002	Palomar	NEAT	NAE	7.6 km	MPC · JPL
166684	2002 TA_{119}	—	October 3, 2002	Palomar	NEAT	EUP	7.3 km	MPC · JPL
166685	2002 TB_{119}	—	October 3, 2002	Palomar	NEAT	·	4.0 km	MPC · JPL
166686	2002 TN_{121}	—	October 3, 2002	Palomar	NEAT	·	4.5 km	MPC · JPL
166687	2002 TE_{133}	—	October 4, 2002	Socorro	LINEAR	·	4.6 km	MPC · JPL
166688	2002 TA_{135}	—	October 4, 2002	Palomar	NEAT	EOS	3.6 km	MPC · JPL
166689	2002 TZ_{138}	—	October 4, 2002	Anderson Mesa	LONEOS	EOS	3.4 km	MPC · JPL
166690	2002 TG_{143}	—	October 4, 2002	Socorro	LINEAR	·	5.7 km	MPC · JPL
166691	2002 TM_{144}	—	October 5, 2002	Socorro	LINEAR	·	3.9 km	MPC · JPL
166692	2002 TE_{148}	—	October 5, 2002	Palomar	NEAT	EUN	2.0 km	MPC · JPL
166693	2002 TT_{149}	—	October 5, 2002	Palomar	NEAT	·	1.8 km	MPC · JPL
166694	2002 TU_{159}	—	October 5, 2002	Palomar	NEAT	EOS	3.8 km	MPC · JPL
166695	2002 TL_{164}	—	October 5, 2002	Palomar	NEAT	H	950 m	MPC · JPL
166696	2002 TG_{165}	—	October 2, 2002	Haleakala	NEAT	DOR	4.2 km	MPC · JPL
166697	2002 TU_{169}	—	October 3, 2002	Palomar	NEAT	·	3.5 km	MPC · JPL
166698	2002 TE_{172}	—	October 4, 2002	Palomar	NEAT	TIR	4.8 km	MPC · JPL
166699	2002 TA_{174}	—	October 4, 2002	Socorro	LINEAR	EOS	3.3 km	MPC · JPL
166700	2002 TN_{174}	—	October 4, 2002	Socorro	LINEAR	EOS	3.0 km	MPC · JPL

== 166701–166800 ==
back to top

Designation			Discovery			Properties		Ref
Permanent	Provisional	Named after	Date	Site	Discoverer(s)	Category	Diam.	Ref
166701	2002 TJ_{175}	—	October 4, 2002	Socorro	LINEAR	·	3.4 km	MPC · JPL
166702	2002 TX_{177}	—	October 11, 2002	Palomar	NEAT	·	4.3 km	MPC · JPL
166703	2002 TT_{178}	—	October 12, 2002	Socorro	LINEAR	·	6.1 km	MPC · JPL
166704	2002 TJ_{179}	—	October 13, 2002	Palomar	NEAT	·	6.1 km	MPC · JPL
166705	2002 TC_{182}	—	October 3, 2002	Socorro	LINEAR	·	3.9 km	MPC · JPL
166706	2002 TQ_{187}	—	October 4, 2002	Socorro	LINEAR	·	5.0 km	MPC · JPL
166707	2002 TS_{192}	—	October 5, 2002	Anderson Mesa	LONEOS	INA	4.8 km	MPC · JPL
166708	2002 TD_{195}	—	October 3, 2002	Socorro	LINEAR	·	3.1 km	MPC · JPL
166709	2002 TM_{198}	—	October 5, 2002	Socorro	LINEAR	·	5.2 km	MPC · JPL
166710	2002 TA_{199}	—	October 5, 2002	Socorro	LINEAR	·	3.4 km	MPC · JPL
166711	2002 TL_{200}	—	October 10, 2002	Bergisch Gladbach	W. Bickel	EOS	4.1 km	MPC · JPL
166712	2002 TP_{203}	—	October 4, 2002	Socorro	LINEAR	·	4.5 km	MPC · JPL
166713	2002 TJ_{204}	—	October 4, 2002	Socorro	LINEAR	·	3.5 km	MPC · JPL
166714	2002 TP_{205}	—	October 4, 2002	Socorro	LINEAR	EOS	4.0 km	MPC · JPL
166715	2002 TY_{206}	—	October 4, 2002	Socorro	LINEAR	EOS	3.8 km	MPC · JPL
166716	2002 TX_{208}	—	October 5, 2002	Socorro	LINEAR	EOS	3.1 km	MPC · JPL
166717	2002 TF_{210}	—	October 7, 2002	Socorro	LINEAR	EOS	3.0 km	MPC · JPL
166718	2002 TL_{213}	—	October 3, 2002	Socorro	LINEAR	EOS	3.7 km	MPC · JPL
166719	2002 TS_{217}	—	October 8, 2002	Kitt Peak	Spacewatch	EOS	3.8 km	MPC · JPL
166720	2002 TP_{226}	—	October 8, 2002	Anderson Mesa	LONEOS	·	5.8 km	MPC · JPL
166721	2002 TQ_{227}	—	October 8, 2002	Anderson Mesa	LONEOS	·	5.5 km	MPC · JPL
166722	2002 TO_{228}	—	October 7, 2002	Socorro	LINEAR	·	3.4 km	MPC · JPL
166723	2002 TY_{238}	—	October 7, 2002	Socorro	LINEAR	·	5.8 km	MPC · JPL
166724	2002 TF_{242}	—	October 9, 2002	Anderson Mesa	LONEOS	·	4.9 km	MPC · JPL
166725	2002 TY_{244}	—	October 7, 2002	Socorro	LINEAR	·	4.1 km	MPC · JPL
166726	2002 TJ_{246}	—	October 9, 2002	Socorro	LINEAR	EMA	6.1 km	MPC · JPL
166727	2002 TQ_{246}	—	October 9, 2002	Socorro	LINEAR	EUP	6.3 km	MPC · JPL
166728	2002 TV_{248}	—	October 7, 2002	Socorro	LINEAR	·	5.5 km	MPC · JPL
166729	2002 TH_{251}	—	October 7, 2002	Haleakala	NEAT	·	3.7 km	MPC · JPL
166730	2002 TG_{256}	—	October 9, 2002	Socorro	LINEAR	·	2.7 km	MPC · JPL
166731	2002 TB_{259}	—	October 9, 2002	Socorro	LINEAR	·	4.7 km	MPC · JPL
166732	2002 TS_{268}	—	October 9, 2002	Socorro	LINEAR	EOS	4.4 km	MPC · JPL
166733	2002 TW_{269}	—	October 9, 2002	Socorro	LINEAR	·	4.3 km	MPC · JPL
166734	2002 TC_{274}	—	October 9, 2002	Socorro	LINEAR	·	3.0 km	MPC · JPL
166735	2002 TW_{274}	—	October 9, 2002	Socorro	LINEAR	·	4.6 km	MPC · JPL
166736	2002 TP_{276}	—	October 9, 2002	Socorro	LINEAR	·	2.1 km	MPC · JPL
166737	2002 TD_{280}	—	October 10, 2002	Socorro	LINEAR	EOS	2.8 km	MPC · JPL
166738	2002 TV_{290}	—	October 10, 2002	Socorro	LINEAR	EOS	3.3 km	MPC · JPL
166739	2002 TX_{290}	—	October 10, 2002	Socorro	LINEAR	·	4.2 km	MPC · JPL
166740	2002 TN_{291}	—	October 10, 2002	Socorro	LINEAR	·	4.7 km	MPC · JPL
166741	2002 TU_{293}	—	October 11, 2002	Palomar	NEAT	·	5.3 km	MPC · JPL
166742	2002 TO_{297}	—	October 11, 2002	Socorro	LINEAR	·	3.1 km	MPC · JPL
166743	2002 TQ_{297}	—	October 11, 2002	Socorro	LINEAR	KOR	2.2 km	MPC · JPL
166744	2002 TU_{298}	—	October 12, 2002	Socorro	LINEAR	·	6.0 km	MPC · JPL
166745 Pindor	2002 TV_{307}	Pindor	October 4, 2002	Apache Point	SDSS	·	4.4 km	MPC · JPL
166746 Marcpostman	2002 TY_{311}	Marcpostman	October 4, 2002	Apache Point	SDSS	·	3.3 km	MPC · JPL
166747 Gordonrichards	2002 TB_{316}	Gordonrichards	October 4, 2002	Apache Point	SDSS	TIR ·	5.3 km	MPC · JPL
166748 Timrayschneider	2002 TW_{320}	Timrayschneider	October 5, 2002	Apache Point	SDSS	KOR	2.1 km	MPC · JPL
166749 Sesar	2002 TV_{366}	Sesar	October 10, 2002	Apache Point	SDSS	·	6.5 km	MPC · JPL
166750	2002 TF_{376}	—	October 3, 2002	Socorro	LINEAR	AST	3.3 km	MPC · JPL
166751	2002 UZ_{2}	—	October 28, 2002	Palomar	NEAT	·	2.8 km	MPC · JPL
166752	2002 UC_{6}	—	October 28, 2002	Palomar	NEAT	·	3.4 km	MPC · JPL
166753	2002 UJ_{6}	—	October 28, 2002	Palomar	NEAT	·	4.4 km	MPC · JPL
166754	2002 US_{13}	—	October 28, 2002	Haleakala	NEAT	·	3.4 km	MPC · JPL
166755	2002 UK_{17}	—	October 28, 2002	Haleakala	NEAT	·	5.1 km	MPC · JPL
166756	2002 UB_{20}	—	October 28, 2002	Palomar	NEAT	HYG	6.0 km	MPC · JPL
166757	2002 UM_{23}	—	October 31, 2002	Socorro	LINEAR	H	1.1 km	MPC · JPL
166758	2002 UL_{25}	—	October 30, 2002	Haleakala	NEAT	·	4.0 km	MPC · JPL
166759	2002 UN_{26}	—	October 31, 2002	Socorro	LINEAR	EOS	3.6 km	MPC · JPL
166760	2002 UW_{26}	—	October 31, 2002	Socorro	LINEAR	·	4.8 km	MPC · JPL
166761	2002 UE_{27}	—	October 31, 2002	Socorro	LINEAR	·	3.9 km	MPC · JPL
166762	2002 UE_{31}	—	October 28, 2002	Haleakala	NEAT	·	3.2 km	MPC · JPL
166763	2002 UC_{33}	—	October 31, 2002	Palomar	NEAT	·	3.4 km	MPC · JPL
166764	2002 UE_{33}	—	October 31, 2002	Anderson Mesa	LONEOS	·	4.8 km	MPC · JPL
166765	2002 UN_{34}	—	October 30, 2002	Haleakala	NEAT	HYG	6.0 km	MPC · JPL
166766	2002 UZ_{48}	—	October 31, 2002	Socorro	LINEAR	·	5.5 km	MPC · JPL
166767	2002 UW_{49}	—	October 31, 2002	Kitt Peak	Spacewatch	EOS	3.1 km	MPC · JPL
166768	2002 VA	—	November 1, 2002	Pla D'Arguines	D'Arguines, Pla	·	4.8 km	MPC · JPL
166769	2002 VQ_{4}	—	November 4, 2002	Palomar	NEAT	·	3.2 km	MPC · JPL
166770	2002 VE_{9}	—	November 1, 2002	Palomar	NEAT	·	2.8 km	MPC · JPL
166771	2002 VJ_{10}	—	November 1, 2002	Palomar	NEAT	HYG	3.8 km	MPC · JPL
166772	2002 VH_{17}	—	November 5, 2002	Socorro	LINEAR	·	3.9 km	MPC · JPL
166773	2002 VZ_{17}	—	November 2, 2002	Haleakala	NEAT	·	5.2 km	MPC · JPL
166774	2002 VU_{18}	—	November 4, 2002	Anderson Mesa	LONEOS	·	4.1 km	MPC · JPL
166775	2002 VR_{19}	—	November 4, 2002	Kitt Peak	Spacewatch	·	4.4 km	MPC · JPL
166776	2002 VZ_{19}	—	November 4, 2002	Kitt Peak	Spacewatch	·	2.4 km	MPC · JPL
166777	2002 VA_{22}	—	November 5, 2002	Socorro	LINEAR	EOS	3.8 km	MPC · JPL
166778	2002 VU_{25}	—	November 5, 2002	Socorro	LINEAR	VER	5.8 km	MPC · JPL
166779	2002 VA_{30}	—	November 5, 2002	Socorro	LINEAR	·	4.2 km	MPC · JPL
166780	2002 VX_{30}	—	November 5, 2002	Socorro	LINEAR	THM	3.3 km	MPC · JPL
166781	2002 VE_{32}	—	November 5, 2002	Socorro	LINEAR	THM	4.7 km	MPC · JPL
166782	2002 VH_{33}	—	November 5, 2002	Socorro	LINEAR	THM	3.8 km	MPC · JPL
166783	2002 VD_{35}	—	November 5, 2002	Socorro	LINEAR	·	4.4 km	MPC · JPL
166784	2002 VD_{36}	—	November 5, 2002	Socorro	LINEAR	EOS	3.9 km	MPC · JPL
166785	2002 VN_{36}	—	November 5, 2002	Anderson Mesa	LONEOS	·	3.0 km	MPC · JPL
166786	2002 VH_{37}	—	November 4, 2002	Palomar	NEAT	·	5.9 km	MPC · JPL
166787	2002 VE_{40}	—	November 8, 2002	Kingsnake	J. V. McClusky	·	7.3 km	MPC · JPL
166788	2002 VX_{41}	—	November 5, 2002	Palomar	NEAT	·	4.5 km	MPC · JPL
166789	2002 VR_{42}	—	November 6, 2002	Socorro	LINEAR	·	4.2 km	MPC · JPL
166790	2002 VS_{44}	—	November 4, 2002	Haleakala	NEAT	·	3.7 km	MPC · JPL
166791	2002 VH_{45}	—	November 5, 2002	Socorro	LINEAR	·	5.7 km	MPC · JPL
166792	2002 VU_{46}	—	November 5, 2002	Palomar	NEAT	·	3.2 km	MPC · JPL
166793	2002 VK_{47}	—	November 5, 2002	Anderson Mesa	LONEOS	·	5.1 km	MPC · JPL
166794	2002 VT_{49}	—	November 5, 2002	Anderson Mesa	LONEOS	EOS	3.5 km	MPC · JPL
166795	2002 VV_{49}	—	November 5, 2002	Anderson Mesa	LONEOS	·	6.5 km	MPC · JPL
166796	2002 VH_{52}	—	November 6, 2002	Anderson Mesa	LONEOS	·	3.7 km	MPC · JPL
166797	2002 VF_{55}	—	November 6, 2002	Socorro	LINEAR	THM	3.5 km	MPC · JPL
166798	2002 VK_{55}	—	November 6, 2002	Socorro	LINEAR	·	4.0 km	MPC · JPL
166799	2002 VB_{57}	—	November 6, 2002	Haleakala	NEAT	·	3.1 km	MPC · JPL
166800	2002 VC_{57}	—	November 6, 2002	Haleakala	NEAT	·	4.9 km	MPC · JPL

== 166801–166900 ==
back to top

Designation			Discovery			Properties		Ref
Permanent	Provisional	Named after	Date	Site	Discoverer(s)	Category	Diam.	Ref
166801	2002 VY_{57}	—	November 6, 2002	Haleakala	NEAT	HYG	4.7 km	MPC · JPL
166802	2002 VG_{58}	—	November 6, 2002	Haleakala	NEAT	HYG	4.6 km	MPC · JPL
166803	2002 VJ_{58}	—	November 6, 2002	Haleakala	NEAT	·	6.7 km	MPC · JPL
166804	2002 VR_{64}	—	November 7, 2002	Anderson Mesa	LONEOS	H	1.1 km	MPC · JPL
166805	2002 VZ_{64}	—	November 7, 2002	Socorro	LINEAR	EOS	4.0 km	MPC · JPL
166806	2002 VP_{70}	—	November 7, 2002	Socorro	LINEAR	KOR	2.4 km	MPC · JPL
166807	2002 VU_{74}	—	November 7, 2002	Socorro	LINEAR	EOS	4.8 km	MPC · JPL
166808	2002 VS_{75}	—	November 7, 2002	Socorro	LINEAR	·	3.1 km	MPC · JPL
166809	2002 VO_{76}	—	November 7, 2002	Socorro	LINEAR	·	3.2 km	MPC · JPL
166810	2002 VT_{78}	—	November 7, 2002	Socorro	LINEAR	·	4.5 km	MPC · JPL
166811	2002 VC_{81}	—	November 7, 2002	Socorro	LINEAR	·	6.1 km	MPC · JPL
166812	2002 VU_{81}	—	November 7, 2002	Socorro	LINEAR	·	5.6 km	MPC · JPL
166813	2002 VK_{82}	—	November 7, 2002	Socorro	LINEAR	·	6.2 km	MPC · JPL
166814	2002 VA_{85}	—	November 8, 2002	Socorro	LINEAR	·	2.8 km	MPC · JPL
166815	2002 VL_{85}	—	November 8, 2002	Socorro	LINEAR	HYG	6.6 km	MPC · JPL
166816	2002 VO_{88}	—	November 11, 2002	Anderson Mesa	LONEOS	·	4.3 km	MPC · JPL
166817	2002 VP_{91}	—	November 11, 2002	Kitt Peak	Spacewatch	·	5.3 km	MPC · JPL
166818	2002 VS_{92}	—	November 11, 2002	Socorro	LINEAR	·	4.4 km	MPC · JPL
166819	2002 VK_{93}	—	November 11, 2002	Socorro	LINEAR	TIR	5.4 km	MPC · JPL
166820	2002 VX_{93}	—	November 12, 2002	Socorro	LINEAR	·	3.2 km	MPC · JPL
166821	2002 VK_{94}	—	November 12, 2002	Socorro	LINEAR	·	5.3 km	MPC · JPL
166822	2002 VV_{95}	—	November 11, 2002	Anderson Mesa	LONEOS	·	4.4 km	MPC · JPL
166823	2002 VE_{96}	—	November 11, 2002	Anderson Mesa	LONEOS	EOS	3.9 km	MPC · JPL
166824	2002 VH_{99}	—	November 13, 2002	Socorro	LINEAR	T_{j} (2.96)	8.4 km	MPC · JPL
166825	2002 VN_{100}	—	November 11, 2002	Anderson Mesa	LONEOS	EOS	3.7 km	MPC · JPL
166826	2002 VV_{100}	—	November 11, 2002	Anderson Mesa	LONEOS	·	4.0 km	MPC · JPL
166827	2002 VJ_{101}	—	November 11, 2002	Socorro	LINEAR	HYG	4.9 km	MPC · JPL
166828	2002 VF_{104}	—	November 12, 2002	Socorro	LINEAR	·	3.9 km	MPC · JPL
166829	2002 VR_{104}	—	November 12, 2002	Socorro	LINEAR	·	5.3 km	MPC · JPL
166830	2002 VD_{107}	—	November 12, 2002	Socorro	LINEAR	·	4.6 km	MPC · JPL
166831	2002 VV_{111}	—	November 13, 2002	Palomar	NEAT	EOS	3.1 km	MPC · JPL
166832	2002 VU_{112}	—	November 13, 2002	Palomar	NEAT	·	2.7 km	MPC · JPL
166833	2002 VD_{114}	—	November 13, 2002	Palomar	NEAT	·	6.2 km	MPC · JPL
166834	2002 VA_{118}	—	November 13, 2002	Socorro	LINEAR	H	840 m	MPC · JPL
166835	2002 VQ_{118}	—	November 12, 2002	Anderson Mesa	LONEOS	·	4.8 km	MPC · JPL
166836	2002 VL_{119}	—	November 12, 2002	Socorro	LINEAR	slow	6.5 km	MPC · JPL
166837	2002 VS_{120}	—	November 12, 2002	Palomar	NEAT	·	4.8 km	MPC · JPL
166838	2002 VY_{120}	—	November 12, 2002	Palomar	NEAT	·	5.1 km	MPC · JPL
166839	2002 VD_{122}	—	November 13, 2002	Palomar	NEAT	·	4.0 km	MPC · JPL
166840	2002 VT_{122}	—	November 13, 2002	Palomar	NEAT	·	4.5 km	MPC · JPL
166841	2002 VX_{122}	—	November 13, 2002	Palomar	NEAT	EOS	5.1 km	MPC · JPL
166842	2002 VS_{124}	—	November 12, 2002	Socorro	LINEAR	·	4.5 km	MPC · JPL
166843	2002 VU_{124}	—	November 12, 2002	Socorro	LINEAR	·	2.9 km	MPC · JPL
166844	2002 VR_{125}	—	November 14, 2002	Socorro	LINEAR	·	3.9 km	MPC · JPL
166845	2002 VT_{125}	—	November 14, 2002	Socorro	LINEAR	EOS	2.9 km	MPC · JPL
166846	2002 VL_{127}	—	November 13, 2002	Socorro	LINEAR	·	8.5 km	MPC · JPL
166847	2002 VM_{127}	—	November 13, 2002	Palomar	NEAT	·	4.3 km	MPC · JPL
166848	2002 VX_{140}	—	November 12, 2002	Palomar	NEAT	·	6.2 km	MPC · JPL
166849	2002 WE_{3}	—	November 24, 2002	Palomar	NEAT	·	5.3 km	MPC · JPL
166850	2002 WF_{3}	—	November 24, 2002	Palomar	NEAT	·	4.7 km	MPC · JPL
166851	2002 WJ_{8}	—	November 24, 2002	Palomar	NEAT	·	7.2 km	MPC · JPL
166852	2002 WE_{9}	—	November 24, 2002	Palomar	NEAT	·	3.5 km	MPC · JPL
166853	2002 WZ_{10}	—	November 25, 2002	Palomar	NEAT	·	5.2 km	MPC · JPL
166854	2002 WC_{11}	—	November 25, 2002	Palomar	NEAT	VER	4.8 km	MPC · JPL
166855	2002 WM_{20}	—	November 27, 2002	Anderson Mesa	LONEOS	·	3.0 km	MPC · JPL
166856	2002 WC_{21}	—	November 24, 2002	Palomar	NEAT	·	3.8 km	MPC · JPL
166857	2002 XE	—	December 1, 2002	Emerald Lane	L. Ball	·	4.3 km	MPC · JPL
166858	2002 XL	—	December 1, 2002	Socorro	LINEAR	·	3.8 km	MPC · JPL
166859	2002 XH_{1}	—	December 1, 2002	Socorro	LINEAR	·	4.3 km	MPC · JPL
166860	2002 XN_{7}	—	December 2, 2002	Socorro	LINEAR	·	7.5 km	MPC · JPL
166861	2002 XB_{16}	—	December 3, 2002	Palomar	NEAT	·	5.6 km	MPC · JPL
166862	2002 XR_{19}	—	December 2, 2002	Socorro	LINEAR	·	5.0 km	MPC · JPL
166863	2002 XM_{29}	—	December 5, 2002	Palomar	NEAT	·	5.3 km	MPC · JPL
166864	2002 XP_{29}	—	December 5, 2002	Palomar	NEAT	·	4.8 km	MPC · JPL
166865	2002 XT_{34}	—	December 6, 2002	Socorro	LINEAR	(31811)	4.8 km	MPC · JPL
166866	2002 XO_{37}	—	December 6, 2002	Socorro	LINEAR	TEL	2.0 km	MPC · JPL
166867	2002 XH_{38}	—	December 6, 2002	Socorro	LINEAR	·	4.1 km	MPC · JPL
166868	2002 XN_{43}	—	December 6, 2002	Socorro	LINEAR	EOS	4.1 km	MPC · JPL
166869	2002 XJ_{47}	—	December 9, 2002	Kitt Peak	Spacewatch	·	4.3 km	MPC · JPL
166870	2002 XT_{47}	—	December 10, 2002	Socorro	LINEAR	·	4.5 km	MPC · JPL
166871	2002 XG_{48}	—	December 10, 2002	Socorro	LINEAR	LIX	7.8 km	MPC · JPL
166872	2002 XP_{50}	—	December 10, 2002	Socorro	LINEAR	·	10 km	MPC · JPL
166873	2002 XB_{51}	—	December 10, 2002	Socorro	LINEAR	·	4.0 km	MPC · JPL
166874	2002 XT_{55}	—	December 10, 2002	Palomar	NEAT	H	1.1 km	MPC · JPL
166875	2002 XH_{60}	—	December 10, 2002	Socorro	LINEAR	·	3.2 km	MPC · JPL
166876	2002 XS_{60}	—	December 10, 2002	Socorro	LINEAR	·	3.5 km	MPC · JPL
166877	2002 XG_{61}	—	December 10, 2002	Socorro	LINEAR	EOS	4.4 km	MPC · JPL
166878	2002 XV_{78}	—	December 11, 2002	Socorro	LINEAR	H	740 m	MPC · JPL
166879	2002 XA_{82}	—	December 11, 2002	Palomar	NEAT	TIR ·	6.8 km	MPC · JPL
166880	2002 XD_{83}	—	December 13, 2002	Socorro	LINEAR	·	5.4 km	MPC · JPL
166881	2002 XG_{88}	—	December 12, 2002	Palomar	NEAT	·	4.4 km	MPC · JPL
166882	2002 XA_{90}	—	December 14, 2002	Socorro	LINEAR	THB	6.8 km	MPC · JPL
166883	2002 XJ_{90}	—	December 14, 2002	Socorro	LINEAR	·	5.9 km	MPC · JPL
166884	2002 XJ_{102}	—	December 5, 2002	Socorro	LINEAR	·	4.2 km	MPC · JPL
166885	2002 YS_{2}	—	December 28, 2002	Nashville	Clingan, R.	·	5.5 km	MPC · JPL
166886 Ybl	2002 YB_{3}	Ybl	December 25, 2002	Piszkéstető	K. Sárneczky	·	4.0 km	MPC · JPL
166887	2002 YN_{3}	—	December 28, 2002	Socorro	LINEAR	·	6.3 km	MPC · JPL
166888	2002 YY_{6}	—	December 28, 2002	Kitt Peak	Spacewatch	·	3.5 km	MPC · JPL
166889	2002 YR_{16}	—	December 31, 2002	Socorro	LINEAR	·	5.4 km	MPC · JPL
166890	2002 YA_{17}	—	December 31, 2002	Socorro	LINEAR	HYG	5.0 km	MPC · JPL
166891	2002 YS_{22}	—	December 31, 2002	Socorro	LINEAR	·	4.9 km	MPC · JPL
166892	2002 YY_{23}	—	December 31, 2002	Socorro	LINEAR	·	4.8 km	MPC · JPL
166893	2002 YW_{26}	—	December 31, 2002	Socorro	LINEAR	·	4.1 km	MPC · JPL
166894	2002 YO_{32}	—	December 27, 2002	Palomar	NEAT	·	4.2 km	MPC · JPL
166895	2002 YD_{35}	—	December 31, 2002	Socorro	LINEAR	·	6.8 km	MPC · JPL
166896	2003 AV_{1}	—	January 2, 2003	Socorro	LINEAR	EOS	3.3 km	MPC · JPL
166897	2003 AD_{2}	—	January 2, 2003	Socorro	LINEAR	·	5.1 km	MPC · JPL
166898	2003 AQ_{2}	—	January 2, 2003	Socorro	LINEAR	H	1.2 km	MPC · JPL
166899	2003 AT_{4}	—	January 1, 2003	Kingsnake	J. V. McClusky	·	7.4 km	MPC · JPL
166900	2003 AJ_{7}	—	January 2, 2003	Socorro	LINEAR	H	1.1 km	MPC · JPL

== 166901–167000 ==
back to top

Designation			Discovery			Properties		Ref
Permanent	Provisional	Named after	Date	Site	Discoverer(s)	Category	Diam.	Ref
166901	2003 AS_{16}	—	January 3, 2003	Socorro	LINEAR	H	770 m	MPC · JPL
166902	2003 AQ_{22}	—	January 5, 2003	Socorro	LINEAR	·	6.5 km	MPC · JPL
166903	2003 AQ_{52}	—	January 5, 2003	Socorro	LINEAR	HYG	4.4 km	MPC · JPL
166904	2003 AH_{67}	—	January 7, 2003	Socorro	LINEAR	·	4.1 km	MPC · JPL
166905	2003 AJ_{72}	—	January 11, 2003	Socorro	LINEAR	·	4.8 km	MPC · JPL
166906	2003 AA_{81}	—	January 12, 2003	Anderson Mesa	LONEOS	·	9.9 km	MPC · JPL
166907	2003 AF_{82}	—	January 13, 2003	Socorro	LINEAR	H	820 m	MPC · JPL
166908	2003 AH_{82}	—	January 13, 2003	Socorro	LINEAR	H	890 m	MPC · JPL
166909	2003 AY_{87}	—	January 1, 2003	Socorro	LINEAR	·	5.6 km	MPC · JPL
166910	2003 BN_{46}	—	January 30, 2003	Socorro	LINEAR	H	1.2 km	MPC · JPL
166911	2003 BW_{48}	—	January 26, 2003	Haleakala	NEAT	·	4.2 km	MPC · JPL
166912	2003 BB_{55}	—	January 27, 2003	Haleakala	NEAT	·	3.5 km	MPC · JPL
166913	2003 BG_{78}	—	January 31, 2003	Socorro	LINEAR	H	910 m	MPC · JPL
166914	2003 CE_{4}	—	February 1, 2003	Palomar	NEAT	·	8.0 km	MPC · JPL
166915	2003 DV_{21}	—	February 28, 2003	Socorro	LINEAR	H	1.0 km	MPC · JPL
166916	2003 EL_{17}	—	March 5, 2003	Socorro	LINEAR	·	2.3 km	MPC · JPL
166917	2003 EL_{34}	—	March 7, 2003	Socorro	LINEAR	·	1.5 km	MPC · JPL
166918	2003 FR_{39}	—	March 24, 2003	Kitt Peak	Spacewatch	·	1.2 km	MPC · JPL
166919	2003 FT_{45}	—	March 24, 2003	Kitt Peak	Spacewatch	·	740 m	MPC · JPL
166920	2003 FS_{47}	—	March 24, 2003	Kitt Peak	Spacewatch	·	840 m	MPC · JPL
166921	2003 FV_{77}	—	March 27, 2003	Palomar	NEAT	·	1.1 km	MPC · JPL
166922	2003 FR_{88}	—	March 28, 2003	Kitt Peak	Spacewatch	·	1.1 km	MPC · JPL
166923	2003 FX_{92}	—	March 29, 2003	Anderson Mesa	LONEOS	·	1.1 km	MPC · JPL
166924	2003 FB_{104}	—	March 24, 2003	Kitt Peak	Spacewatch	·	770 m	MPC · JPL
166925	2003 FN_{127}	—	March 27, 2003	Palomar	NEAT	·	1.1 km	MPC · JPL
166926	2003 GL_{3}	—	April 1, 2003	Socorro	LINEAR	·	990 m	MPC · JPL
166927	2003 GQ_{8}	—	April 3, 2003	Anderson Mesa	LONEOS	·	1.3 km	MPC · JPL
166928	2003 GD_{13}	—	April 1, 2003	Haleakala	NEAT	·	950 m	MPC · JPL
166929	2003 GP_{43}	—	April 9, 2003	Socorro	LINEAR	·	1.9 km	MPC · JPL
166930	2003 GA_{48}	—	April 8, 2003	Socorro	LINEAR	·	1.5 km	MPC · JPL
166931	2003 HQ	—	April 20, 2003	Haleakala	NEAT	·	1.0 km	MPC · JPL
166932	2003 HT_{10}	—	April 25, 2003	Kitt Peak	Spacewatch	·	990 m	MPC · JPL
166933	2003 HN_{11}	—	April 24, 2003	Kitt Peak	Spacewatch	·	1.4 km	MPC · JPL
166934	2003 HB_{16}	—	April 24, 2003	Anderson Mesa	LONEOS	·	1.2 km	MPC · JPL
166935	2003 HF_{28}	—	April 26, 2003	Haleakala	NEAT	·	1.1 km	MPC · JPL
166936	2003 HP_{28}	—	April 26, 2003	Haleakala	NEAT	NYS	2.1 km	MPC · JPL
166937	2003 HF_{39}	—	April 29, 2003	Socorro	LINEAR	·	1.2 km	MPC · JPL
166938	2003 HC_{40}	—	April 29, 2003	Socorro	LINEAR	·	1.1 km	MPC · JPL
166939	2003 HD_{41}	—	April 29, 2003	Socorro	LINEAR	·	2.7 km	MPC · JPL
166940	2003 HU_{44}	—	April 28, 2003	Haleakala	NEAT	·	1.6 km	MPC · JPL
166941	2003 HQ_{46}	—	April 28, 2003	Socorro	LINEAR	·	1.5 km	MPC · JPL
166942	2003 HP_{48}	—	April 30, 2003	Socorro	LINEAR	·	1.4 km	MPC · JPL
166943	2003 HL_{50}	—	April 29, 2003	Socorro	LINEAR	·	850 m	MPC · JPL
166944 Seton	2003 HP_{53}	Seton	April 25, 2003	Goodricke-Pigott	Kumar, P.	·	1.6 km	MPC · JPL
166945	2003 HS_{54}	—	April 24, 2003	Haleakala	NEAT	·	1.0 km	MPC · JPL
166946	2003 JD_{8}	—	May 2, 2003	Socorro	LINEAR	·	1.1 km	MPC · JPL
166947	2003 JS_{8}	—	May 2, 2003	Socorro	LINEAR	·	1.4 km	MPC · JPL
166948	2003 JL_{9}	—	May 2, 2003	Kitt Peak	Spacewatch	·	950 m	MPC · JPL
166949	2003 JU_{10}	—	May 5, 2003	Catalina	CSS	·	1.2 km	MPC · JPL
166950	2003 JJ_{14}	—	May 8, 2003	Haleakala	NEAT	·	1.3 km	MPC · JPL
166951	2003 KB_{4}	—	May 23, 2003	Reedy Creek	J. Broughton	·	2.3 km	MPC · JPL
166952	2003 KE_{17}	—	May 26, 2003	Haleakala	NEAT	·	1.2 km	MPC · JPL
166953	2003 KE_{30}	—	May 25, 2003	Kitt Peak	Spacewatch	·	1.4 km	MPC · JPL
166954	2003 LY_{1}	—	June 2, 2003	Socorro	LINEAR	PHO	2.1 km	MPC · JPL
166955	2003 MO_{4}	—	June 26, 2003	Socorro	LINEAR	·	2.2 km	MPC · JPL
166956	2003 MK_{6}	—	June 27, 2003	Socorro	LINEAR	·	1.8 km	MPC · JPL
166957	2003 MF_{8}	—	June 28, 2003	Socorro	LINEAR	·	2.1 km	MPC · JPL
166958	2003 MN_{8}	—	June 28, 2003	Socorro	LINEAR	·	1.2 km	MPC · JPL
166959	2003 MF_{12}	—	June 29, 2003	Socorro	LINEAR	PHO	3.6 km	MPC · JPL
166960	2003 NS	—	July 1, 2003	Haleakala	NEAT	·	2.8 km	MPC · JPL
166961	2003 NZ_{1}	—	July 2, 2003	Socorro	LINEAR	·	2.7 km	MPC · JPL
166962	2003 NB_{2}	—	July 1, 2003	Socorro	LINEAR	·	1.6 km	MPC · JPL
166963	2003 NN_{2}	—	July 3, 2003	Reedy Creek	J. Broughton	·	1.1 km	MPC · JPL
166964	2003 NK_{3}	—	July 4, 2003	Socorro	LINEAR	V	1.1 km	MPC · JPL
166965	2003 NZ_{7}	—	July 8, 2003	Palomar	NEAT	·	2.1 km	MPC · JPL
166966	2003 OT_{1}	—	July 21, 2003	Campo Imperatore	CINEOS	NYS	1.9 km	MPC · JPL
166967	2003 OH_{2}	—	July 22, 2003	Haleakala	NEAT	·	2.3 km	MPC · JPL
166968	2003 OQ_{2}	—	July 22, 2003	Haleakala	NEAT	·	1.8 km	MPC · JPL
166969	2003 OR_{3}	—	July 22, 2003	Campo Imperatore	CINEOS	·	1.5 km	MPC · JPL
166970	2003 OV_{3}	—	July 22, 2003	Campo Imperatore	CINEOS	·	1.9 km	MPC · JPL
166971	2003 OD_{4}	—	July 21, 2003	Campo Imperatore	CINEOS	·	2.7 km	MPC · JPL
166972	2003 OJ_{4}	—	July 22, 2003	Campo Imperatore	CINEOS	·	1.6 km	MPC · JPL
166973	2003 OV_{5}	—	July 24, 2003	Reedy Creek	J. Broughton	·	3.1 km	MPC · JPL
166974 Joanbinimelis	2003 OZ_{5}	Joanbinimelis	July 24, 2003	Majorca	OAM	V	1.1 km	MPC · JPL
166975	2003 OE_{10}	—	July 25, 2003	Socorro	LINEAR	MAS	1.3 km	MPC · JPL
166976	2003 OW_{10}	—	July 27, 2003	Reedy Creek	J. Broughton	·	2.1 km	MPC · JPL
166977	2003 OK_{12}	—	July 22, 2003	Palomar	NEAT	·	2.4 km	MPC · JPL
166978	2003 OJ_{13}	—	July 28, 2003	Reedy Creek	J. Broughton	·	2.0 km	MPC · JPL
166979	2003 OP_{14}	—	July 22, 2003	Palomar	NEAT	PHO	1.5 km	MPC · JPL
166980	2003 OH_{15}	—	July 23, 2003	Socorro	LINEAR	·	1.7 km	MPC · JPL
166981	2003 OC_{19}	—	July 30, 2003	Palomar	NEAT	·	2.0 km	MPC · JPL
166982	2003 OT_{21}	—	July 28, 2003	Campo Imperatore	CINEOS	·	850 m	MPC · JPL
166983	2003 OT_{23}	—	July 22, 2003	Haleakala	NEAT	·	1.7 km	MPC · JPL
166984	2003 OX_{25}	—	July 24, 2003	Palomar	NEAT	NYS	1.7 km	MPC · JPL
166985	2003 OW_{27}	—	July 24, 2003	Palomar	NEAT	·	2.8 km	MPC · JPL
166986	2003 OO_{28}	—	July 24, 2003	Palomar	NEAT	MAS	1.2 km	MPC · JPL
166987	2003 OW_{28}	—	July 24, 2003	Palomar	NEAT	·	3.0 km	MPC · JPL
166988	2003 OC_{30}	—	July 24, 2003	Palomar	NEAT	·	1.6 km	MPC · JPL
166989	2003 OL_{30}	—	July 24, 2003	Palomar	NEAT	NYS	1.8 km	MPC · JPL
166990	2003 OR_{32}	—	July 24, 2003	Palomar	NEAT	·	3.7 km	MPC · JPL
166991	2003 PY	—	August 1, 2003	Socorro	LINEAR	·	2.5 km	MPC · JPL
166992	2003 PX_{1}	—	August 1, 2003	Haleakala	NEAT	NYS	1.7 km	MPC · JPL
166993	2003 PY_{1}	—	August 1, 2003	Haleakala	NEAT	·	1.9 km	MPC · JPL
166994	2003 PZ_{2}	—	August 2, 2003	Haleakala	NEAT	·	1.9 km	MPC · JPL
166995	2003 PQ_{3}	—	August 2, 2003	Haleakala	NEAT	·	2.2 km	MPC · JPL
166996	2003 PC_{4}	—	August 2, 2003	Haleakala	NEAT	PHO	2.3 km	MPC · JPL
166997	2003 PA_{5}	—	August 4, 2003	Socorro	LINEAR	·	1.8 km	MPC · JPL
166998	2003 PE_{5}	—	August 4, 2003	Socorro	LINEAR	·	2.6 km	MPC · JPL
166999	2003 PR_{5}	—	August 1, 2003	Socorro	LINEAR	·	1.7 km	MPC · JPL
167000	2003 PE_{6}	—	August 1, 2003	Socorro	LINEAR	·	1.4 km	MPC · JPL

back to top

== See also ==
- Meanings of minor-planet names: 166001–167000
