= List of minor planets: 164001–165000 =

The following is a partial list of minor planets, running from minor-planet number 164001 through 165000, inclusive. The primary data for this and other partial lists is based on JPL's "Small-Body Orbital Elements" and data available from the Minor Planet Center. Critical list information is also provided by the MPC, unless otherwise specified from Lowell Observatory. A detailed description of the table's columns and additional sources are given on the main page including a complete list of every page in this series, and a statistical break-up on the dynamical classification of minor planets.

Also see the summary list of all named bodies in numerical and alphabetical order, and the corresponding naming citations for the number range of this particular list. New namings may only be added to this list after official publication, as the preannouncement of names is condemned by the Working Group for Small Bodies Nomenclature of the International Astronomical Union.

Near-Earth obj.	MBA (inner)	MBA (outer)	Centaur
Mars-crosser	MBA (middle)	Jupiter trojan	Trans-Neptunian obj.
Unclassified

== 164001–164100 ==
Designation			Discovery			Properties		Ref
Permanent	Provisional	Named after	Date	Site	Discoverer(s)	Category	Diam.	Ref
164001	2003 UP_{170}	—	October 22, 2003	Kitt Peak	Spacewatch	WIT	1.9 km	MPC · JPL
164002	2003 UU_{172}	—	October 20, 2003	Socorro	LINEAR	·	2.1 km	MPC · JPL
164003	2003 UE_{174}	—	October 21, 2003	Kitt Peak	Spacewatch	MIS	4.2 km	MPC · JPL
164004	2003 UR_{174}	—	October 21, 2003	Kitt Peak	Spacewatch	·	2.4 km	MPC · JPL
164005	2003 US_{185}	—	October 21, 2003	Kitt Peak	Spacewatch	·	2.2 km	MPC · JPL
164006 Thierry	2003 UT_{185}	Thierry	October 21, 2003	Saint-Sulpice	B. Christophe	(5)	1.5 km	MPC · JPL
164007	2003 UW_{186}	—	October 22, 2003	Socorro	LINEAR	·	3.4 km	MPC · JPL
164008	2003 UJ_{189}	—	October 22, 2003	Kitt Peak	Spacewatch	·	2.4 km	MPC · JPL
164009	2003 UZ_{189}	—	October 22, 2003	Kitt Peak	Spacewatch	·	3.3 km	MPC · JPL
164010	2003 UV_{192}	—	October 20, 2003	Kitt Peak	Spacewatch	·	3.4 km	MPC · JPL
164011	2003 UX_{194}	—	October 20, 2003	Palomar	NEAT	·	4.1 km	MPC · JPL
164012	2003 UL_{197}	—	October 21, 2003	Kitt Peak	Spacewatch	(12739)	2.7 km	MPC · JPL
164013	2003 UT_{197}	—	October 21, 2003	Anderson Mesa	LONEOS	·	2.7 km	MPC · JPL
164014	2003 UO_{200}	—	October 21, 2003	Socorro	LINEAR	·	3.0 km	MPC · JPL
164015	2003 UC_{203}	—	October 21, 2003	Kitt Peak	Spacewatch	·	2.8 km	MPC · JPL
164016	2003 UK_{204}	—	October 21, 2003	Kitt Peak	Spacewatch	ADE	4.7 km	MPC · JPL
164017	2003 UL_{206}	—	October 22, 2003	Socorro	LINEAR	·	4.2 km	MPC · JPL
164018	2003 UP_{207}	—	October 22, 2003	Socorro	LINEAR	EUN	2.6 km	MPC · JPL
164019	2003 UR_{208}	—	October 22, 2003	Kitt Peak	Spacewatch	·	2.9 km	MPC · JPL
164020	2003 UC_{219}	—	October 21, 2003	Socorro	LINEAR	·	4.1 km	MPC · JPL
164021	2003 UQ_{220}	—	October 21, 2003	Anderson Mesa	LONEOS	·	4.3 km	MPC · JPL
164022	2003 UA_{222}	—	October 22, 2003	Socorro	LINEAR	WIT	1.7 km	MPC · JPL
164023	2003 UZ_{222}	—	October 22, 2003	Socorro	LINEAR	·	5.5 km	MPC · JPL
164024	2003 UZ_{224}	—	October 22, 2003	Socorro	LINEAR	·	2.5 km	MPC · JPL
164025	2003 UH_{226}	—	October 22, 2003	Kitt Peak	Spacewatch	HOF	4.7 km	MPC · JPL
164026	2003 UT_{227}	—	October 23, 2003	Kitt Peak	Spacewatch	·	2.9 km	MPC · JPL
164027	2003 UY_{232}	—	October 24, 2003	Socorro	LINEAR	·	1.9 km	MPC · JPL
164028	2003 UA_{241}	—	October 24, 2003	Kitt Peak	Spacewatch	·	3.7 km	MPC · JPL
164029	2003 UA_{244}	—	October 24, 2003	Socorro	LINEAR	·	3.5 km	MPC · JPL
164030	2003 UJ_{245}	—	October 24, 2003	Socorro	LINEAR	fast	2.3 km	MPC · JPL
164031	2003 UQ_{247}	—	October 24, 2003	Socorro	LINEAR	(5)	2.7 km	MPC · JPL
164032	2003 UR_{249}	—	October 25, 2003	Socorro	LINEAR	·	2.0 km	MPC · JPL
164033	2003 UC_{251}	—	October 25, 2003	Socorro	LINEAR	·	2.3 km	MPC · JPL
164034	2003 UX_{252}	—	October 26, 2003	Kitt Peak	Spacewatch	·	2.0 km	MPC · JPL
164035	2003 UH_{254}	—	October 24, 2003	Kitt Peak	Spacewatch	·	1.4 km	MPC · JPL
164036	2003 UZ_{255}	—	October 25, 2003	Socorro	LINEAR	·	1.9 km	MPC · JPL
164037	2003 UP_{257}	—	October 25, 2003	Socorro	LINEAR	·	4.4 km	MPC · JPL
164038	2003 UP_{264}	—	October 27, 2003	Socorro	LINEAR	·	3.4 km	MPC · JPL
164039	2003 UE_{265}	—	October 27, 2003	Socorro	LINEAR	·	2.0 km	MPC · JPL
164040	2003 UQ_{265}	—	October 27, 2003	Kitt Peak	Spacewatch	(5)	2.6 km	MPC · JPL
164041	2003 UF_{266}	—	October 28, 2003	Socorro	LINEAR	·	3.0 km	MPC · JPL
164042	2003 UO_{269}	—	October 29, 2003	Catalina	CSS	·	4.0 km	MPC · JPL
164043	2003 UM_{278}	—	October 25, 2003	Socorro	LINEAR	·	2.0 km	MPC · JPL
164044	2003 US_{279}	—	October 27, 2003	Kitt Peak	Spacewatch	·	2.8 km	MPC · JPL
164045	2003 UC_{283}	—	October 29, 2003	Anderson Mesa	LONEOS	·	3.4 km	MPC · JPL
164046	2003 UW_{283}	—	October 30, 2003	Socorro	LINEAR	EUN	3.4 km	MPC · JPL
164047	2003 UL_{296}	—	October 16, 2003	Kitt Peak	Spacewatch	·	2.3 km	MPC · JPL
164048	2003 UO_{298}	—	October 16, 2003	Kitt Peak	Spacewatch	·	1.8 km	MPC · JPL
164049	2003 UC_{302}	—	October 17, 2003	Kitt Peak	Spacewatch	·	1.6 km	MPC · JPL
164050	2003 UO_{307}	—	October 18, 2003	Kitt Peak	Spacewatch	·	2.6 km	MPC · JPL
164051	2003 UL_{314}	—	October 19, 2003	Kitt Peak	Spacewatch	·	2.1 km	MPC · JPL
164052	2003 VC_{5}	—	November 15, 2003	Kitt Peak	Spacewatch	·	3.0 km	MPC · JPL
164053	2003 VP_{5}	—	November 15, 2003	Kitt Peak	Spacewatch	·	2.5 km	MPC · JPL
164054	2003 VH_{6}	—	November 14, 2003	Palomar	NEAT	·	2.8 km	MPC · JPL
164055	2003 VL_{8}	—	November 15, 2003	Palomar	NEAT	·	3.1 km	MPC · JPL
164056	2003 VO_{10}	—	November 15, 2003	Kitt Peak	Spacewatch	·	2.9 km	MPC · JPL
164057	2003 WR_{10}	—	November 18, 2003	Kitt Peak	Spacewatch	·	3.1 km	MPC · JPL
164058	2003 WV_{11}	—	November 18, 2003	Palomar	NEAT	·	3.2 km	MPC · JPL
164059	2003 WH_{13}	—	November 16, 2003	Catalina	CSS	EUN ·	3.5 km	MPC · JPL
164060	2003 WV_{16}	—	November 18, 2003	Palomar	NEAT	·	2.5 km	MPC · JPL
164061	2003 WF_{29}	—	November 18, 2003	Kitt Peak	Spacewatch	·	2.6 km	MPC · JPL
164062	2003 WL_{38}	—	November 19, 2003	Socorro	LINEAR	·	3.1 km	MPC · JPL
164063	2003 WP_{40}	—	November 19, 2003	Kitt Peak	Spacewatch	·	2.1 km	MPC · JPL
164064	2003 WY_{46}	—	November 18, 2003	Palomar	NEAT	MRX	1.8 km	MPC · JPL
164065	2003 WN_{50}	—	November 19, 2003	Socorro	LINEAR	·	3.3 km	MPC · JPL
164066	2003 WY_{55}	—	November 20, 2003	Socorro	LINEAR	·	2.9 km	MPC · JPL
164067	2003 WH_{65}	—	November 19, 2003	Kitt Peak	Spacewatch	·	2.6 km	MPC · JPL
164068	2003 WJ_{66}	—	November 19, 2003	Socorro	LINEAR	·	3.6 km	MPC · JPL
164069	2003 WK_{69}	—	November 19, 2003	Kitt Peak	Spacewatch	AGN	2.0 km	MPC · JPL
164070	2003 WV_{70}	—	November 20, 2003	Palomar	NEAT	MAR	3.6 km	MPC · JPL
164071	2003 WT_{80}	—	November 20, 2003	Catalina	CSS	EUN	1.7 km	MPC · JPL
164072	2003 WS_{81}	—	November 18, 2003	Palomar	NEAT	ADE	5.3 km	MPC · JPL
164073	2003 WR_{84}	—	November 19, 2003	Catalina	CSS	·	3.9 km	MPC · JPL
164074	2003 WD_{86}	—	November 21, 2003	Palomar	NEAT	MAR	2.0 km	MPC · JPL
164075	2003 WU_{87}	—	November 22, 2003	Socorro	LINEAR	·	2.0 km	MPC · JPL
164076	2003 WE_{89}	—	November 16, 2003	Catalina	CSS	PAD	4.3 km	MPC · JPL
164077	2003 WP_{91}	—	November 18, 2003	Kitt Peak	Spacewatch	AGN	2.1 km	MPC · JPL
164078	2003 WK_{94}	—	November 19, 2003	Anderson Mesa	LONEOS	·	4.0 km	MPC · JPL
164079	2003 WS_{94}	—	November 19, 2003	Anderson Mesa	LONEOS	·	3.7 km	MPC · JPL
164080	2003 WJ_{96}	—	November 19, 2003	Anderson Mesa	LONEOS	AST	3.5 km	MPC · JPL
164081	2003 WB_{97}	—	November 19, 2003	Anderson Mesa	LONEOS	·	3.0 km	MPC · JPL
164082	2003 WX_{102}	—	November 21, 2003	Socorro	LINEAR	·	4.8 km	MPC · JPL
164083	2003 WU_{103}	—	November 21, 2003	Socorro	LINEAR	·	2.1 km	MPC · JPL
164084	2003 WR_{121}	—	November 20, 2003	Socorro	LINEAR	EUN	3.2 km	MPC · JPL
164085	2003 WD_{122}	—	November 20, 2003	Kitt Peak	Spacewatch	TEL	2.5 km	MPC · JPL
164086	2003 WM_{122}	—	November 20, 2003	Socorro	LINEAR	(5)	2.3 km	MPC · JPL
164087	2003 WU_{122}	—	November 20, 2003	Socorro	LINEAR	EOS	3.6 km	MPC · JPL
164088	2003 WQ_{125}	—	November 20, 2003	Socorro	LINEAR	·	3.5 km	MPC · JPL
164089	2003 WV_{126}	—	November 20, 2003	Socorro	LINEAR	·	1.8 km	MPC · JPL
164090	2003 WF_{132}	—	November 19, 2003	Kitt Peak	Spacewatch	·	2.7 km	MPC · JPL
164091	2003 WY_{134}	—	November 21, 2003	Socorro	LINEAR	·	5.1 km	MPC · JPL
164092	2003 WX_{136}	—	November 21, 2003	Socorro	LINEAR	·	5.6 km	MPC · JPL
164093	2003 WF_{142}	—	November 21, 2003	Socorro	LINEAR	CLO	3.3 km	MPC · JPL
164094	2003 WT_{142}	—	November 21, 2003	Palomar	NEAT	NYS	1.8 km	MPC · JPL
164095	2003 WS_{144}	—	November 21, 2003	Socorro	LINEAR	·	2.5 km	MPC · JPL
164096	2003 WZ_{155}	—	November 29, 2003	Socorro	LINEAR	·	3.4 km	MPC · JPL
164097	2003 WU_{156}	—	November 29, 2003	Kitt Peak	Spacewatch	·	2.9 km	MPC · JPL
164098	2003 WX_{161}	—	November 30, 2003	Socorro	LINEAR	·	3.1 km	MPC · JPL
164099	2003 WE_{163}	—	November 30, 2003	Kitt Peak	Spacewatch	·	3.6 km	MPC · JPL
164100	2003 WV_{166}	—	November 18, 2003	Palomar	NEAT	KOR	2.1 km	MPC · JPL

== 164101–164200 ==
back to top

Designation			Discovery			Properties		Ref
Permanent	Provisional	Named after	Date	Site	Discoverer(s)	Category	Diam.	Ref
164101	2003 WD_{168}	—	November 19, 2003	Kitt Peak	Spacewatch	·	2.6 km	MPC · JPL
164102	2003 WY_{175}	—	November 19, 2003	Kitt Peak	Spacewatch	·	3.0 km	MPC · JPL
164103	2003 XG_{5}	—	December 1, 2003	Kitt Peak	Spacewatch	·	3.2 km	MPC · JPL
164104	2003 XF_{9}	—	December 4, 2003	Socorro	LINEAR	BRA	5.1 km	MPC · JPL
164105	2003 XT_{9}	—	December 4, 2003	Socorro	LINEAR	·	3.6 km	MPC · JPL
164106	2003 XQ_{10}	—	December 11, 2003	Socorro	LINEAR	·	7.0 km	MPC · JPL
164107	2003 XU_{11}	—	December 13, 2003	Socorro	LINEAR	JUN	1.8 km	MPC · JPL
164108	2003 XW_{11}	—	December 13, 2003	Palomar	NEAT	EUN	2.0 km	MPC · JPL
164109	2003 XF_{13}	—	December 14, 2003	Kitt Peak	Spacewatch	HYG	4.3 km	MPC · JPL
164110	2003 XM_{16}	—	December 14, 2003	Palomar	NEAT	·	6.5 km	MPC · JPL
164111	2003 XQ_{17}	—	December 15, 2003	Kitt Peak	Spacewatch	·	3.2 km	MPC · JPL
164112	2003 XJ_{19}	—	December 14, 2003	Kitt Peak	Spacewatch	·	2.1 km	MPC · JPL
164113	2003 XT_{21}	—	December 15, 2003	Socorro	LINEAR	·	3.5 km	MPC · JPL
164114	2003 XR_{27}	—	December 1, 2003	Socorro	LINEAR	AEO	4.1 km	MPC · JPL
164115	2003 XC_{33}	—	December 1, 2003	Kitt Peak	Spacewatch	KOR	1.9 km	MPC · JPL
164116	2003 XP_{33}	—	December 1, 2003	Kitt Peak	Spacewatch	(12739)	2.5 km	MPC · JPL
164117	2003 XL_{36}	—	December 3, 2003	Socorro	LINEAR	·	3.7 km	MPC · JPL
164118	2003 XY_{37}	—	December 4, 2003	Socorro	LINEAR	·	5.0 km	MPC · JPL
164119	2003 XF_{40}	—	December 14, 2003	Kitt Peak	Spacewatch	·	2.4 km	MPC · JPL
164120	2003 YK	—	December 17, 2003	Socorro	LINEAR	APO	550 m	MPC · JPL
164121	2003 YT_{1}	—	December 18, 2003	Catalina	CSS	APO +1km · PHA · moon	1.7 km	MPC · JPL
164122	2003 YY_{3}	—	December 16, 2003	Catalina	CSS	(5)	2.5 km	MPC · JPL
164123	2003 YG_{5}	—	December 16, 2003	Catalina	CSS	·	3.5 km	MPC · JPL
164124	2003 YD_{10}	—	December 17, 2003	Socorro	LINEAR	·	3.6 km	MPC · JPL
164125	2003 YZ_{10}	—	December 17, 2003	Socorro	LINEAR	·	4.9 km	MPC · JPL
164126	2003 YV_{13}	—	December 17, 2003	Catalina	CSS	·	3.5 km	MPC · JPL
164127	2003 YO_{14}	—	December 17, 2003	Socorro	LINEAR	EOS	6.3 km	MPC · JPL
164128	2003 YM_{16}	—	December 17, 2003	Anderson Mesa	LONEOS	·	6.5 km	MPC · JPL
164129	2003 YB_{21}	—	December 17, 2003	Kitt Peak	Spacewatch	·	2.9 km	MPC · JPL
164130 Jonckhèere	2003 YY_{21}	Jonckhèere	December 18, 2003	Uccle	T. Pauwels, P. De Cat	·	3.1 km	MPC · JPL
164131	2003 YL_{43}	—	December 19, 2003	Socorro	LINEAR	THM	5.0 km	MPC · JPL
164132	2003 YU_{45}	—	December 17, 2003	Socorro	LINEAR	·	4.5 km	MPC · JPL
164133	2003 YS_{48}	—	December 18, 2003	Socorro	LINEAR	·	2.8 km	MPC · JPL
164134	2003 YY_{48}	—	December 18, 2003	Socorro	LINEAR	NAE	7.2 km	MPC · JPL
164135	2003 YU_{58}	—	December 19, 2003	Socorro	LINEAR	THM	5.0 km	MPC · JPL
164136	2003 YY_{69}	—	December 21, 2003	Socorro	LINEAR	·	4.0 km	MPC · JPL
164137	2003 YS_{78}	—	December 18, 2003	Socorro	LINEAR	URS	8.0 km	MPC · JPL
164138	2003 YE_{81}	—	December 18, 2003	Socorro	LINEAR	·	4.2 km	MPC · JPL
164139	2003 YC_{84}	—	December 19, 2003	Socorro	LINEAR	·	2.2 km	MPC · JPL
164140	2003 YM_{85}	—	December 19, 2003	Socorro	LINEAR	DOR	4.7 km	MPC · JPL
164141	2003 YP_{87}	—	December 19, 2003	Socorro	LINEAR	·	4.9 km	MPC · JPL
164142	2003 YB_{91}	—	December 20, 2003	Socorro	LINEAR	·	4.9 km	MPC · JPL
164143	2003 YG_{91}	—	December 20, 2003	Socorro	LINEAR	·	3.9 km	MPC · JPL
164144	2003 YF_{96}	—	December 19, 2003	Socorro	LINEAR	·	4.0 km	MPC · JPL
164145	2003 YG_{104}	—	December 21, 2003	Socorro	LINEAR	TEL	2.6 km	MPC · JPL
164146	2003 YQ_{106}	—	December 22, 2003	Socorro	LINEAR	EOS	3.0 km	MPC · JPL
164147	2003 YR_{108}	—	December 22, 2003	Palomar	NEAT	·	3.2 km	MPC · JPL
164148	2003 YZ_{110}	—	December 22, 2003	Kitt Peak	Spacewatch	NYS	2.1 km	MPC · JPL
164149	2003 YL_{114}	—	December 25, 2003	Haleakala	NEAT	EOS	4.0 km	MPC · JPL
164150	2003 YF_{119}	—	December 27, 2003	Socorro	LINEAR	·	5.6 km	MPC · JPL
164151	2003 YM_{125}	—	December 27, 2003	Socorro	LINEAR	·	3.7 km	MPC · JPL
164152	2003 YP_{126}	—	December 27, 2003	Socorro	LINEAR	EOS	3.7 km	MPC · JPL
164153	2003 YS_{128}	—	December 27, 2003	Socorro	LINEAR	·	5.6 km	MPC · JPL
164154	2003 YE_{129}	—	December 27, 2003	Socorro	LINEAR	·	3.9 km	MPC · JPL
164155	2003 YS_{133}	—	December 28, 2003	Socorro	LINEAR	·	5.1 km	MPC · JPL
164156	2003 YD_{142}	—	December 28, 2003	Socorro	LINEAR	·	4.8 km	MPC · JPL
164157	2003 YY_{142}	—	December 28, 2003	Socorro	LINEAR	EOS	3.3 km	MPC · JPL
164158	2003 YE_{144}	—	December 28, 2003	Socorro	LINEAR	·	5.2 km	MPC · JPL
164159	2003 YY_{151}	—	December 29, 2003	Socorro	LINEAR	·	6.6 km	MPC · JPL
164160	2003 YL_{153}	—	December 29, 2003	Socorro	LINEAR	EUN	2.4 km	MPC · JPL
164161	2003 YW_{154}	—	December 30, 2003	Socorro	LINEAR	·	3.3 km	MPC · JPL
164162	2003 YY_{154}	—	December 30, 2003	Socorro	LINEAR	·	3.4 km	MPC · JPL
164163	2003 YS_{155}	—	December 26, 2003	Haleakala	NEAT	·	6.3 km	MPC · JPL
164164	2003 YK_{166}	—	December 17, 2003	Kitt Peak	Spacewatch	·	2.6 km	MPC · JPL
164165	2004 AC_{4}	—	January 13, 2004	Anderson Mesa	LONEOS	TEL	2.4 km	MPC · JPL
164166	2004 AQ_{5}	—	January 13, 2004	Anderson Mesa	LONEOS	EOS	4.2 km	MPC · JPL
164167	2004 AJ_{7}	—	January 13, 2004	Palomar	NEAT	TEL	2.4 km	MPC · JPL
164168	2004 AP_{8}	—	January 14, 2004	Palomar	NEAT	·	6.3 km	MPC · JPL
164169	2004 AK_{25}	—	January 12, 2004	Palomar	NEAT	·	6.2 km	MPC · JPL
164170	2004 AS_{25}	—	January 12, 2004	Palomar	NEAT	·	3.8 km	MPC · JPL
164171	2004 AP_{26}	—	January 13, 2004	Anderson Mesa	LONEOS	·	5.1 km	MPC · JPL
164172	2004 BY_{5}	—	January 16, 2004	Kitt Peak	Spacewatch	TEL	2.5 km	MPC · JPL
164173	2004 BM_{10}	—	January 17, 2004	Kitt Peak	Spacewatch	·	2.7 km	MPC · JPL
164174	2004 BM_{17}	—	January 18, 2004	Kitt Peak	Spacewatch	·	3.6 km	MPC · JPL
164175	2004 BO_{37}	—	January 19, 2004	Kitt Peak	Spacewatch	HYG	5.5 km	MPC · JPL
164176	2004 BE_{46}	—	January 21, 2004	Socorro	LINEAR	·	4.2 km	MPC · JPL
164177	2004 BM_{46}	—	January 21, 2004	Socorro	LINEAR	fast	3.2 km	MPC · JPL
164178	2004 BP_{48}	—	January 21, 2004	Socorro	LINEAR	·	3.9 km	MPC · JPL
164179	2004 BA_{49}	—	January 21, 2004	Socorro	LINEAR	·	2.8 km	MPC · JPL
164180	2004 BD_{52}	—	January 21, 2004	Socorro	LINEAR	GEF	2.4 km	MPC · JPL
164181	2004 BJ_{52}	—	January 21, 2004	Socorro	LINEAR	·	3.0 km	MPC · JPL
164182	2004 BM_{52}	—	January 21, 2004	Socorro	LINEAR	·	2.9 km	MPC · JPL
164183	2004 BG_{59}	—	January 23, 2004	Socorro	LINEAR	·	4.7 km	MPC · JPL
164184	2004 BF_{68}	—	January 27, 2004	Socorro	LINEAR	APO	460 m	MPC · JPL
164185	2004 BD_{69}	—	January 20, 2004	Kingsnake	J. V. McClusky	·	3.8 km	MPC · JPL
164186	2004 BP_{70}	—	January 22, 2004	Socorro	LINEAR	·	4.7 km	MPC · JPL
164187	2004 BR_{70}	—	January 22, 2004	Socorro	LINEAR	·	6.0 km	MPC · JPL
164188	2004 BB_{74}	—	January 24, 2004	Socorro	LINEAR	EOS	4.2 km	MPC · JPL
164189	2004 BQ_{76}	—	January 25, 2004	Haleakala	NEAT	·	7.5 km	MPC · JPL
164190	2004 BD_{80}	—	January 24, 2004	Socorro	LINEAR	THM	4.8 km	MPC · JPL
164191	2004 BD_{94}	—	January 28, 2004	Haleakala	NEAT	·	6.0 km	MPC · JPL
164192	2004 BP_{105}	—	January 25, 2004	Haleakala	NEAT	BRA	3.4 km	MPC · JPL
164193	2004 BM_{146}	—	January 22, 2004	Socorro	LINEAR	·	6.6 km	MPC · JPL
164194	2004 BM_{151}	—	January 18, 2004	Palomar	NEAT	·	5.1 km	MPC · JPL
164195	2004 CT_{13}	—	February 11, 2004	Palomar	NEAT	THM	3.5 km	MPC · JPL
164196	2004 CF_{52}	—	February 14, 2004	Socorro	LINEAR	(14916)	3.7 km	MPC · JPL
164197	2004 CQ_{68}	—	February 11, 2004	Palomar	NEAT	·	3.0 km	MPC · JPL
164198	2004 CN_{74}	—	February 11, 2004	Palomar	NEAT	·	5.9 km	MPC · JPL
164199	2004 CP_{80}	—	February 11, 2004	Palomar	NEAT	·	5.8 km	MPC · JPL
164200	2004 DK_{29}	—	February 17, 2004	Kitt Peak	Spacewatch	LIX	6.8 km	MPC · JPL

== 164201–164300 ==
back to top

Designation			Discovery			Properties		Ref
Permanent	Provisional	Named after	Date	Site	Discoverer(s)	Category	Diam.	Ref
164201	2004 EC	—	March 10, 2004	Socorro	LINEAR	APO +1km	2.5 km	MPC · JPL
164202	2004 EW	—	March 13, 2004	Catalina	CSS	ATE · PHA	230 m	MPC · JPL
164203	2004 ED_{11}	—	March 15, 2004	Socorro	LINEAR	HNS	2.4 km	MPC · JPL
164204	2004 EK_{45}	—	March 15, 2004	Kitt Peak	Spacewatch	·	2.9 km	MPC · JPL
164205	2004 EE_{51}	—	March 14, 2004	Kitt Peak	Spacewatch	THM	3.4 km	MPC · JPL
164206	2004 FN_{18}	—	March 27, 2004	Socorro	LINEAR	AMO · APO +1km	1.1 km	MPC · JPL
164207 Cardea	2004 GU_{9}	Cardea	April 13, 2004	Socorro	LINEAR	APO · PHA	160 m	MPC · JPL
164208	2004 HB_{27}	—	April 20, 2004	Socorro	LINEAR	L4	16 km	MPC · JPL
164209	2004 HD_{57}	—	April 27, 2004	Socorro	LINEAR	H	1.1 km	MPC · JPL
164210	2004 JH_{21}	—	May 9, 2004	Kitt Peak	Spacewatch	L4	10 km	MPC · JPL
164211	2004 JA_{27}	—	May 15, 2004	Socorro	LINEAR	APO · PHA	450 m	MPC · JPL
164212	2004 JB_{48}	—	May 13, 2004	Kitt Peak	Spacewatch	L4	15 km	MPC · JPL
164213	2004 LS_{2}	—	June 11, 2004	Socorro	LINEAR	H	950 m	MPC · JPL
164214	2004 LZ_{11}	—	June 14, 2004	Socorro	LINEAR	AMO	500 m	MPC · JPL
164215 Doloreshill	2004 MF_{6}	Doloreshill	June 25, 2004	Catalina	CSS	AMO · critical	350 m	MPC · JPL
164216	2004 OT_{11}	—	July 27, 2004	Socorro	LINEAR	APO +1km · PHA	1.3 km	MPC · JPL
164217	2004 PT_{42}	—	August 11, 2004	Siding Spring	SSS	AMO +1km	1.3 km	MPC · JPL
164218	2004 PX_{84}	—	August 10, 2004	Socorro	LINEAR	PHO	2.0 km	MPC · JPL
164219	2004 QK_{3}	—	August 21, 2004	Reedy Creek	J. Broughton	H	820 m	MPC · JPL
164220	2004 QW_{16}	—	August 25, 2004	Socorro	LINEAR	·	1.5 km	MPC · JPL
164221	2004 QE_{20}	—	August 26, 2004	Anderson Mesa	LONEOS	AMO	290 m	MPC · JPL
164222	2004 RN_{9}	—	September 7, 2004	Socorro	LINEAR	APO	240 m	MPC · JPL
164223	2004 RV_{80}	—	September 8, 2004	Socorro	LINEAR	·	1.7 km	MPC · JPL
164224	2004 RY_{182}	—	September 10, 2004	Socorro	LINEAR	·	1.0 km	MPC · JPL
164225	2004 RV_{194}	—	September 10, 2004	Socorro	LINEAR	·	1.6 km	MPC · JPL
164226	2004 RD_{199}	—	September 10, 2004	Socorro	LINEAR	·	1.3 km	MPC · JPL
164227	2004 RE_{228}	—	September 9, 2004	Kitt Peak	Spacewatch	·	1.0 km	MPC · JPL
164228	2004 RC_{229}	—	September 9, 2004	Kitt Peak	Spacewatch	·	1.4 km	MPC · JPL
164229	2004 RB_{308}	—	September 13, 2004	Socorro	LINEAR	·	1.1 km	MPC · JPL
164230	2004 RD_{314}	—	September 15, 2004	Kitt Peak	Spacewatch	·	1.2 km	MPC · JPL
164231	2004 RC_{335}	—	September 15, 2004	Anderson Mesa	LONEOS	·	1.5 km	MPC · JPL
164232	2004 SB_{23}	—	September 17, 2004	Kitt Peak	Spacewatch	·	1.4 km	MPC · JPL
164233	2004 SX_{53}	—	September 22, 2004	Goodricke-Pigott	R. A. Tucker	·	970 m	MPC · JPL
164234	2004 TJ_{5}	—	October 4, 2004	Kitt Peak	Spacewatch	·	1.1 km	MPC · JPL
164235	2004 TQ_{15}	—	October 9, 2004	Kitt Peak	Spacewatch	·	1.5 km	MPC · JPL
164236	2004 TW_{20}	—	October 11, 2004	Kitt Peak	Spacewatch	·	1.2 km	MPC · JPL
164237	2004 TZ_{20}	—	October 11, 2004	Kitt Peak	Spacewatch	·	1.7 km	MPC · JPL
164238	2004 TM_{28}	—	October 4, 2004	Kitt Peak	Spacewatch	·	930 m	MPC · JPL
164239	2004 TL_{35}	—	October 4, 2004	Kitt Peak	Spacewatch	·	770 m	MPC · JPL
164240	2004 TO_{44}	—	October 4, 2004	Kitt Peak	Spacewatch	NYS	2.3 km	MPC · JPL
164241	2004 TF_{46}	—	October 4, 2004	Kitt Peak	Spacewatch	·	880 m	MPC · JPL
164242	2004 TV_{51}	—	October 4, 2004	Kitt Peak	Spacewatch	·	1.1 km	MPC · JPL
164243	2004 TX_{101}	—	October 6, 2004	Kitt Peak	Spacewatch	·	1.4 km	MPC · JPL
164244	2004 TC_{103}	—	October 6, 2004	Palomar	NEAT	·	970 m	MPC · JPL
164245	2004 TV_{110}	—	October 7, 2004	Kitt Peak	Spacewatch	·	1.1 km	MPC · JPL
164246	2004 TV_{113}	—	October 7, 2004	Palomar	NEAT	·	1.1 km	MPC · JPL
164247	2004 TP_{133}	—	October 7, 2004	Anderson Mesa	LONEOS	·	2.2 km	MPC · JPL
164248	2004 TS_{133}	—	October 7, 2004	Palomar	NEAT	·	1.2 km	MPC · JPL
164249	2004 TK_{138}	—	October 9, 2004	Anderson Mesa	LONEOS	·	1.2 km	MPC · JPL
164250	2004 TW_{148}	—	October 6, 2004	Kitt Peak	Spacewatch	·	1.6 km	MPC · JPL
164251	2004 TT_{169}	—	October 7, 2004	Socorro	LINEAR	·	1.2 km	MPC · JPL
164252	2004 TQ_{216}	—	October 15, 2004	Anderson Mesa	LONEOS	·	970 m	MPC · JPL
164253	2004 TU_{232}	—	October 8, 2004	Kitt Peak	Spacewatch	·	1.2 km	MPC · JPL
164254	2004 TF_{238}	—	October 9, 2004	Kitt Peak	Spacewatch	·	750 m	MPC · JPL
164255	2004 TW_{261}	—	October 9, 2004	Socorro	LINEAR	·	1.1 km	MPC · JPL
164256	2004 TQ_{262}	—	October 9, 2004	Socorro	LINEAR	·	1.0 km	MPC · JPL
164257	2004 TD_{277}	—	October 9, 2004	Kitt Peak	Spacewatch	·	950 m	MPC · JPL
164258	2004 TF_{278}	—	October 9, 2004	Kitt Peak	Spacewatch	·	1.2 km	MPC · JPL
164259	2004 TH_{283}	—	October 7, 2004	Palomar	NEAT	·	1.3 km	MPC · JPL
164260	2004 TW_{316}	—	October 11, 2004	Kitt Peak	Spacewatch	·	900 m	MPC · JPL
164261	2004 TV_{330}	—	October 9, 2004	Socorro	LINEAR	·	1.4 km	MPC · JPL
164262	2004 TZ_{332}	—	October 9, 2004	Kitt Peak	Spacewatch	·	1.3 km	MPC · JPL
164263	2004 UW_{4}	—	October 16, 2004	Socorro	LINEAR	PHO	4.6 km	MPC · JPL
164264	2004 UU_{7}	—	October 21, 2004	Socorro	LINEAR	·	1.1 km	MPC · JPL
164265	2004 VO	—	November 2, 2004	Desert Eagle	W. K. Y. Yeung	·	2.3 km	MPC · JPL
164266	2004 VK_{5}	—	November 3, 2004	Anderson Mesa	LONEOS	·	850 m	MPC · JPL
164267	2004 VC_{27}	—	November 4, 2004	Catalina	CSS	V	1.1 km	MPC · JPL
164268 Hajmási	2004 VV_{69}	Hajmási	November 11, 2004	Piszkéstető	K. Sárneczky	·	970 m	MPC · JPL
164269	2004 WS_{8}	—	November 19, 2004	Socorro	LINEAR	·	1.6 km	MPC · JPL
164270	2004 XR_{1}	—	December 1, 2004	Catalina	CSS	·	1.1 km	MPC · JPL
164271	2004 XG_{4}	—	December 2, 2004	Socorro	LINEAR	·	1.6 km	MPC · JPL
164272	2004 XM_{7}	—	December 2, 2004	Palomar	NEAT	·	1.3 km	MPC · JPL
164273	2004 XO_{16}	—	December 8, 2004	Socorro	LINEAR	·	2.4 km	MPC · JPL
164274	2004 XM_{17}	—	December 3, 2004	Kitt Peak	Spacewatch	·	1.8 km	MPC · JPL
164275	2004 XJ_{19}	—	December 8, 2004	Socorro	LINEAR	MAS	1.2 km	MPC · JPL
164276	2004 XG_{24}	—	December 9, 2004	Catalina	CSS	·	1.3 km	MPC · JPL
164277	2004 XK_{30}	—	December 10, 2004	Campo Imperatore	CINEOS	V	1.2 km	MPC · JPL
164278	2004 XF_{33}	—	December 10, 2004	Socorro	LINEAR	·	2.4 km	MPC · JPL
164279	2004 XV_{42}	—	December 9, 2004	Catalina	CSS	V	1.2 km	MPC · JPL
164280	2004 XX_{58}	—	December 10, 2004	Kitt Peak	Spacewatch	·	820 m	MPC · JPL
164281	2004 XF_{71}	—	December 11, 2004	Črni Vrh	Skvarč, J.	·	1.5 km	MPC · JPL
164282	2004 XZ_{71}	—	December 13, 2004	Anderson Mesa	LONEOS	·	1.5 km	MPC · JPL
164283	2004 XU_{74}	—	December 9, 2004	Socorro	LINEAR	·	2.2 km	MPC · JPL
164284	2004 XH_{75}	—	December 9, 2004	Kitt Peak	Spacewatch	EUN	2.1 km	MPC · JPL
164285	2004 XF_{82}	—	December 11, 2004	Kitt Peak	Spacewatch	·	1.0 km	MPC · JPL
164286	2004 XO_{86}	—	December 13, 2004	Kitt Peak	Spacewatch	SUL	3.2 km	MPC · JPL
164287	2004 XJ_{87}	—	December 9, 2004	Catalina	CSS	·	1.1 km	MPC · JPL
164288	2004 XA_{93}	—	December 11, 2004	Socorro	LINEAR	·	1.2 km	MPC · JPL
164289	2004 XJ_{97}	—	December 11, 2004	Kitt Peak	Spacewatch	·	6.8 km	MPC · JPL
164290	2004 XY_{106}	—	December 11, 2004	Socorro	LINEAR	·	1.2 km	MPC · JPL
164291	2004 XK_{108}	—	December 11, 2004	Socorro	LINEAR	·	2.2 km	MPC · JPL
164292	2004 XN_{121}	—	December 14, 2004	Catalina	CSS	·	1.3 km	MPC · JPL
164293	2004 XO_{124}	—	December 10, 2004	Socorro	LINEAR	HNS	2.3 km	MPC · JPL
164294	2004 XZ_{130}	—	December 13, 2004	Mauna Kea	D. J. Tholen	IEO · critical	290 m	MPC · JPL
164295	2004 XA_{131}	—	December 9, 2004	Catalina	CSS	T_{j} (2.71)	11 km	MPC · JPL
164296	2004 XD_{131}	—	December 11, 2004	Kitt Peak	Spacewatch	·	1.6 km	MPC · JPL
164297	2004 XN_{140}	—	December 13, 2004	Kitt Peak	Spacewatch	·	1.8 km	MPC · JPL
164298	2004 XY_{181}	—	December 15, 2004	Socorro	LINEAR	NYS	2.3 km	MPC · JPL
164299	2004 XP_{186}	—	December 15, 2004	Socorro	LINEAR	·	2.1 km	MPC · JPL
164300	2004 YN_{16}	—	December 18, 2004	Mount Lemmon	Mount Lemmon Survey	·	2.7 km	MPC · JPL

== 164301–164400 ==
back to top

Designation			Discovery			Properties		Ref
Permanent	Provisional	Named after	Date	Site	Discoverer(s)	Category	Diam.	Ref
164301	2004 YY_{20}	—	December 18, 2004	Mount Lemmon	Mount Lemmon Survey	MAS	1.1 km	MPC · JPL
164302	2004 YH_{21}	—	December 18, 2004	Mount Lemmon	Mount Lemmon Survey	·	1.8 km	MPC · JPL
164303	2004 YE_{25}	—	December 18, 2004	Mount Lemmon	Mount Lemmon Survey	NYS	1.9 km	MPC · JPL
164304	2005 AR_{4}	—	January 6, 2005	Catalina	CSS	·	2.4 km	MPC · JPL
164305	2005 AR_{10}	—	January 6, 2005	Catalina	CSS	SUL	3.7 km	MPC · JPL
164306	2005 AC_{11}	—	January 8, 2005	RAS	Lowe, A.	V	1.1 km	MPC · JPL
164307	2005 AJ_{11}	—	January 1, 2005	Catalina	CSS	·	4.2 km	MPC · JPL
164308	2005 AE_{12}	—	January 6, 2005	Catalina	CSS	·	2.5 km	MPC · JPL
164309	2005 AL_{20}	—	January 6, 2005	Socorro	LINEAR	·	2.2 km	MPC · JPL
164310	2005 AW_{20}	—	January 6, 2005	Socorro	LINEAR	·	1.8 km	MPC · JPL
164311	2005 AC_{21}	—	January 6, 2005	Socorro	LINEAR	·	2.3 km	MPC · JPL
164312	2005 AD_{22}	—	January 6, 2005	Socorro	LINEAR	·	2.2 km	MPC · JPL
164313	2005 AL_{23}	—	January 7, 2005	Socorro	LINEAR	NYS	1.9 km	MPC · JPL
164314	2005 AC_{26}	—	January 11, 2005	Socorro	LINEAR	·	1.8 km	MPC · JPL
164315	2005 AW_{29}	—	January 8, 2005	Campo Imperatore	CINEOS	·	3.3 km	MPC · JPL
164316	2005 AP_{32}	—	January 11, 2005	Socorro	LINEAR	·	1.6 km	MPC · JPL
164317	2005 AS_{35}	—	January 13, 2005	Socorro	LINEAR	PHO	1.8 km	MPC · JPL
164318	2005 AJ_{37}	—	January 13, 2005	Socorro	LINEAR	·	2.6 km	MPC · JPL
164319	2005 AJ_{40}	—	January 15, 2005	Socorro	LINEAR	·	2.3 km	MPC · JPL
164320	2005 AS_{41}	—	January 15, 2005	Socorro	LINEAR	·	2.1 km	MPC · JPL
164321	2005 AH_{43}	—	January 15, 2005	Socorro	LINEAR	MAS	1.0 km	MPC · JPL
164322	2005 AT_{43}	—	January 15, 2005	Kitt Peak	Spacewatch	·	1.7 km	MPC · JPL
164323	2005 AS_{46}	—	January 11, 2005	Socorro	LINEAR	·	2.2 km	MPC · JPL
164324	2005 AU_{47}	—	January 13, 2005	Kitt Peak	Spacewatch	MAS	1.0 km	MPC · JPL
164325	2005 AJ_{48}	—	January 13, 2005	Kitt Peak	Spacewatch	·	3.7 km	MPC · JPL
164326	2005 AJ_{49}	—	January 13, 2005	Socorro	LINEAR	·	2.7 km	MPC · JPL
164327	2005 AO_{49}	—	January 13, 2005	Socorro	LINEAR	·	4.8 km	MPC · JPL
164328	2005 AH_{54}	—	January 13, 2005	Kitt Peak	Spacewatch	·	3.8 km	MPC · JPL
164329	2005 AE_{69}	—	January 15, 2005	Anderson Mesa	LONEOS	·	1.9 km	MPC · JPL
164330	2005 AG_{69}	—	January 15, 2005	Socorro	LINEAR	NYS	1.9 km	MPC · JPL
164331	2005 AV_{72}	—	January 15, 2005	Kitt Peak	Spacewatch	·	2.9 km	MPC · JPL
164332	2005 AW_{79}	—	January 15, 2005	Kitt Peak	Spacewatch	NYS	1.8 km	MPC · JPL
164333	2005 BF	—	January 16, 2005	Desert Eagle	W. K. Y. Yeung	·	1.2 km	MPC · JPL
164334	2005 BF_{2}	—	January 18, 2005	RAS	Wolff, U.	·	3.6 km	MPC · JPL
164335	2005 BR_{2}	—	January 16, 2005	Socorro	LINEAR	PHO	1.8 km	MPC · JPL
164336	2005 BB_{11}	—	January 16, 2005	Kitt Peak	Spacewatch	·	1.9 km	MPC · JPL
164337	2005 BR_{12}	—	January 17, 2005	Socorro	LINEAR	MAS	1.2 km	MPC · JPL
164338	2005 BN_{16}	—	January 16, 2005	Socorro	LINEAR	·	2.8 km	MPC · JPL
164339	2005 BO_{16}	—	January 16, 2005	Socorro	LINEAR	NYS	2.0 km	MPC · JPL
164340	2005 BF_{43}	—	January 16, 2005	Mauna Kea	Veillet, C.	·	1.9 km	MPC · JPL
164341	2005 CO	—	February 2, 2005	Socorro	LINEAR	AMO · critical	270 m	MPC · JPL
164342	2005 CP	—	February 2, 2005	Socorro	LINEAR	AMO · APO · critical	230 m	MPC · JPL
164343	2005 CU_{12}	—	February 2, 2005	Kitt Peak	Spacewatch	·	5.5 km	MPC · JPL
164344	2005 CJ_{14}	—	February 2, 2005	Kitt Peak	Spacewatch	·	3.9 km	MPC · JPL
164345	2005 CV_{15}	—	February 2, 2005	Socorro	LINEAR	NYS	1.5 km	MPC · JPL
164346	2005 CH_{31}	—	February 1, 2005	Kitt Peak	Spacewatch	·	3.5 km	MPC · JPL
164347	2005 CN_{48}	—	February 2, 2005	Catalina	CSS	·	3.5 km	MPC · JPL
164348	2005 CP_{49}	—	February 2, 2005	Catalina	CSS	·	3.1 km	MPC · JPL
164349	2005 CO_{51}	—	February 2, 2005	Catalina	CSS	·	2.4 km	MPC · JPL
164350	2005 CU_{52}	—	February 3, 2005	Socorro	LINEAR	·	5.1 km	MPC · JPL
164351	2005 CA_{56}	—	February 4, 2005	Mount Lemmon	Mount Lemmon Survey	NYS	1.8 km	MPC · JPL
164352	2005 CW_{57}	—	February 2, 2005	Catalina	CSS	·	3.0 km	MPC · JPL
164353	2005 CH_{59}	—	February 2, 2005	Socorro	LINEAR	·	3.0 km	MPC · JPL
164354	2005 CG_{62}	—	February 9, 2005	Anderson Mesa	LONEOS	·	2.6 km	MPC · JPL
164355	2005 CQ_{65}	—	February 9, 2005	Socorro	LINEAR	·	2.9 km	MPC · JPL
164356	2005 CF_{73}	—	February 1, 2005	Kitt Peak	Spacewatch	KOR	1.9 km	MPC · JPL
164357	2005 CN_{75}	—	February 2, 2005	Kitt Peak	Spacewatch	·	2.4 km	MPC · JPL
164358	2005 DB	—	February 16, 2005	Gnosca	S. Sposetti	EOS	4.3 km	MPC · JPL
164359	2005 EC_{1}	—	March 2, 2005	Great Shefford	Birtwhistle, P.	·	4.7 km	MPC · JPL
164360	2005 EL_{2}	—	March 1, 2005	Gnosca	S. Sposetti	·	2.5 km	MPC · JPL
164361	2005 EV_{11}	—	March 2, 2005	Catalina	CSS	·	3.0 km	MPC · JPL
164362	2005 EH_{13}	—	March 3, 2005	Kitt Peak	Spacewatch	·	2.5 km	MPC · JPL
164363	2005 EN_{14}	—	March 3, 2005	Kitt Peak	Spacewatch	KOR	2.9 km	MPC · JPL
164364	2005 EG_{23}	—	March 3, 2005	Catalina	CSS	·	4.6 km	MPC · JPL
164365	2005 EO_{35}	—	March 4, 2005	Catalina	CSS	HYG	5.3 km	MPC · JPL
164366	2005 EV_{40}	—	March 1, 2005	Socorro	LINEAR	·	6.5 km	MPC · JPL
164367	2005 EB_{46}	—	March 3, 2005	Catalina	CSS	·	3.1 km	MPC · JPL
164368	2005 EJ_{48}	—	March 3, 2005	Catalina	CSS	·	3.3 km	MPC · JPL
164369	2005 ED_{49}	—	March 3, 2005	Catalina	CSS	·	3.1 km	MPC · JPL
164370	2005 EZ_{49}	—	March 3, 2005	Catalina	CSS	·	3.5 km	MPC · JPL
164371	2005 ET_{65}	—	March 4, 2005	Mount Lemmon	Mount Lemmon Survey	·	4.6 km	MPC · JPL
164372	2005 EU_{67}	—	March 4, 2005	Mount Lemmon	Mount Lemmon Survey	KOR	2.6 km	MPC · JPL
164373	2005 ED_{68}	—	March 7, 2005	Socorro	LINEAR	·	7.7 km	MPC · JPL
164374	2005 EM_{97}	—	March 3, 2005	Catalina	CSS	·	2.0 km	MPC · JPL
164375	2005 EM_{107}	—	March 4, 2005	Catalina	CSS	·	6.8 km	MPC · JPL
164376	2005 ET_{113}	—	March 4, 2005	Catalina	CSS	slow	4.1 km	MPC · JPL
164377	2005 EM_{118}	—	March 7, 2005	Socorro	LINEAR	EOS	4.3 km	MPC · JPL
164378	2005 EY_{124}	—	March 8, 2005	Mount Lemmon	Mount Lemmon Survey	KOR	2.3 km	MPC · JPL
164379	2005 EE_{134}	—	March 9, 2005	Mount Lemmon	Mount Lemmon Survey	AGN	1.9 km	MPC · JPL
164380	2005 EB_{148}	—	March 10, 2005	Kitt Peak	Spacewatch	·	3.9 km	MPC · JPL
164381	2005 EC_{168}	—	March 11, 2005	Mount Lemmon	Mount Lemmon Survey	·	2.2 km	MPC · JPL
164382	2005 EQ_{182}	—	March 9, 2005	Socorro	LINEAR	·	7.1 km	MPC · JPL
164383	2005 ES_{205}	—	March 13, 2005	Kitt Peak	Spacewatch	·	1.8 km	MPC · JPL
164384	2005 EJ_{210}	—	March 4, 2005	Kitt Peak	Spacewatch	·	4.9 km	MPC · JPL
164385	2005 EQ_{217}	—	March 9, 2005	Mount Lemmon	Mount Lemmon Survey	·	5.4 km	MPC · JPL
164386	2005 EJ_{240}	—	March 11, 2005	Kitt Peak	Spacewatch	·	3.5 km	MPC · JPL
164387	2005 EY_{263}	—	March 13, 2005	Kitt Peak	Spacewatch	·	5.6 km	MPC · JPL
164388	2005 EG_{273}	—	March 3, 2005	Kitt Peak	Spacewatch	WIT	1.5 km	MPC · JPL
164389	2005 EL_{278}	—	March 9, 2005	Mount Lemmon	Mount Lemmon Survey	·	4.9 km	MPC · JPL
164390	2005 EO_{289}	—	March 9, 2005	Catalina	CSS	TEL	2.6 km	MPC · JPL
164391	2005 EG_{318}	—	March 13, 2005	Mount Lemmon	Mount Lemmon Survey	·	4.6 km	MPC · JPL
164392	2005 FG_{5}	—	March 30, 2005	Catalina	CSS	PHO	1.4 km	MPC · JPL
164393	2005 GP_{1}	—	April 1, 2005	Catalina	CSS	·	7.6 km	MPC · JPL
164394	2005 GH_{2}	—	April 1, 2005	Catalina	CSS	·	3.5 km	MPC · JPL
164395	2005 GJ_{20}	—	April 2, 2005	Anderson Mesa	LONEOS	·	3.2 km	MPC · JPL
164396	2005 GW_{38}	—	April 4, 2005	Catalina	CSS	·	4.1 km	MPC · JPL
164397	2005 GK_{39}	—	April 4, 2005	Mount Lemmon	Mount Lemmon Survey	EOS	2.6 km	MPC · JPL
164398	2005 GZ_{39}	—	April 4, 2005	Mount Lemmon	Mount Lemmon Survey	(5)	2.4 km	MPC · JPL
164399	2005 GK_{45}	—	April 5, 2005	Palomar	NEAT	·	3.8 km	MPC · JPL
164400	2005 GN_{59}	—	April 7, 2005	Kitt Peak	Spacewatch	APO +1km · PHA	1.2 km	MPC · JPL

== 164401–164500 ==
back to top

Designation			Discovery			Properties		Ref
Permanent	Provisional	Named after	Date	Site	Discoverer(s)	Category	Diam.	Ref
164401	2005 GU_{69}	—	April 4, 2005	Kitt Peak	Spacewatch	·	2.6 km	MPC · JPL
164402	2005 GT_{104}	—	April 10, 2005	Kitt Peak	Spacewatch	AEG	7.0 km	MPC · JPL
164403	2005 GR_{170}	—	April 12, 2005	Socorro	LINEAR	·	5.4 km	MPC · JPL
164404	2005 JJ_{158}	—	May 6, 2005	Catalina	CSS	·	3.2 km	MPC · JPL
164405 Fennell	2005 UK_{504}	Fennell	October 24, 2005	Mauna Kea	D. J. Tholen	·	2.3 km	MPC · JPL
164406 Akiyamatoshio	2005 UV_{504}	Akiyamatoshio	October 24, 2005	Mauna Kea	D. J. Tholen	·	1.4 km	MPC · JPL
164407	2005 YB_{207}	—	December 27, 2005	Mount Lemmon	Mount Lemmon Survey	·	1.4 km	MPC · JPL
164408	2005 YA_{215}	—	December 30, 2005	Catalina	CSS	H	1.1 km	MPC · JPL
164409	2005 YY_{237}	—	December 28, 2005	Mount Lemmon	Mount Lemmon Survey	·	1.5 km	MPC · JPL
164410	2005 YT_{248}	—	December 27, 2005	Kitt Peak	Spacewatch	TIR	5.2 km	MPC · JPL
164411	2006 AP_{35}	—	January 4, 2006	Mount Lemmon	Mount Lemmon Survey	·	1.0 km	MPC · JPL
164412	2006 AE_{71}	—	January 6, 2006	Kitt Peak	Spacewatch	NYS	2.0 km	MPC · JPL
164413	2006 AW_{75}	—	January 4, 2006	Catalina	CSS	·	3.2 km	MPC · JPL
164414	2006 BK_{6}	—	January 19, 2006	Catalina	CSS	H	820 m	MPC · JPL
164415	2006 BC_{34}	—	January 21, 2006	Kitt Peak	Spacewatch	NYS	1.8 km	MPC · JPL
164416	2006 BA_{51}	—	January 25, 2006	Catalina	CSS	·	2.7 km	MPC · JPL
164417	2006 BM_{57}	—	January 23, 2006	Kitt Peak	Spacewatch	·	1.0 km	MPC · JPL
164418	2006 BU_{90}	—	January 26, 2006	Kitt Peak	Spacewatch	·	1.4 km	MPC · JPL
164419	2006 BW_{94}	—	January 26, 2006	Kitt Peak	Spacewatch	NYS	1.8 km	MPC · JPL
164420	2006 BH_{97}	—	January 26, 2006	Kitt Peak	Spacewatch	·	1.5 km	MPC · JPL
164421	2006 BJ_{98}	—	January 27, 2006	Mount Lemmon	Mount Lemmon Survey	·	3.2 km	MPC · JPL
164422	2006 BH_{123}	—	January 26, 2006	Kitt Peak	Spacewatch	NYS	1.8 km	MPC · JPL
164423	2006 BZ_{136}	—	January 28, 2006	Mount Lemmon	Mount Lemmon Survey	·	1.1 km	MPC · JPL
164424	2006 BP_{138}	—	January 28, 2006	Mount Lemmon	Mount Lemmon Survey	·	2.6 km	MPC · JPL
164425	2006 BH_{140}	—	January 21, 2006	Mount Lemmon	Mount Lemmon Survey	·	1.7 km	MPC · JPL
164426	2006 BF_{183}	—	January 27, 2006	Mount Lemmon	Mount Lemmon Survey	·	1.9 km	MPC · JPL
164427	2006 BZ_{190}	—	January 28, 2006	Kitt Peak	Spacewatch	·	2.3 km	MPC · JPL
164428	2006 BK_{241}	—	January 31, 2006	Kitt Peak	Spacewatch	·	1.0 km	MPC · JPL
164429	2006 BU_{261}	—	January 31, 2006	Kitt Peak	Spacewatch	PHO	1.5 km	MPC · JPL
164430	2006 BW_{267}	—	January 26, 2006	Catalina	CSS	·	1.5 km	MPC · JPL
164431	2006 BL_{274}	—	January 27, 2006	Mount Lemmon	Mount Lemmon Survey	·	860 m	MPC · JPL
164432	2006 CF_{23}	—	February 1, 2006	Kitt Peak	Spacewatch	·	3.9 km	MPC · JPL
164433	2006 CJ_{40}	—	February 2, 2006	Mount Lemmon	Mount Lemmon Survey	V	880 m	MPC · JPL
164434	2006 CS_{58}	—	February 5, 2006	Mount Lemmon	Mount Lemmon Survey	·	3.9 km	MPC · JPL
164435	2006 CZ_{60}	—	February 6, 2006	Anderson Mesa	LONEOS	NYS	2.0 km	MPC · JPL
164436	2006 CF_{62}	—	February 13, 2006	Palomar	NEAT	EUN	2.6 km	MPC · JPL
164437	2006 CP_{65}	—	February 1, 2006	Kitt Peak	Spacewatch	·	1.1 km	MPC · JPL
164438	2006 DS	—	February 20, 2006	Kitt Peak	Spacewatch	H	760 m	MPC · JPL
164439	2006 DM_{6}	—	February 20, 2006	Catalina	CSS	H	760 m	MPC · JPL
164440	2006 DK_{14}	—	February 22, 2006	Catalina	CSS	·	2.6 km	MPC · JPL
164441	2006 DX_{22}	—	February 20, 2006	Kitt Peak	Spacewatch	MAS	1.1 km	MPC · JPL
164442	2006 DR_{31}	—	February 20, 2006	Mount Lemmon	Mount Lemmon Survey	MAS	1.1 km	MPC · JPL
164443	2006 DH_{35}	—	February 20, 2006	Kitt Peak	Spacewatch	·	3.1 km	MPC · JPL
164444	2006 DZ_{38}	—	February 21, 2006	Kitt Peak	Spacewatch	·	1.1 km	MPC · JPL
164445	2006 DC_{39}	—	February 21, 2006	Mount Lemmon	Mount Lemmon Survey	MAS	970 m	MPC · JPL
164446	2006 DO_{41}	—	February 23, 2006	Anderson Mesa	LONEOS	·	3.2 km	MPC · JPL
164447	2006 DD_{44}	—	February 20, 2006	Catalina	CSS	·	2.3 km	MPC · JPL
164448	2006 DX_{46}	—	February 20, 2006	Kitt Peak	Spacewatch	·	3.0 km	MPC · JPL
164449	2006 DJ_{57}	—	February 24, 2006	Catalina	CSS	·	1.7 km	MPC · JPL
164450	2006 DZ_{57}	—	February 24, 2006	Mount Lemmon	Mount Lemmon Survey	NYS	1.8 km	MPC · JPL
164451	2006 DW_{60}	—	February 24, 2006	Kitt Peak	Spacewatch	·	2.2 km	MPC · JPL
164452	2006 DF_{62}	—	February 22, 2006	Socorro	LINEAR	NYS	1.9 km	MPC · JPL
164453	2006 DH_{65}	—	February 20, 2006	Catalina	CSS	·	1.5 km	MPC · JPL
164454	2006 DM_{65}	—	February 21, 2006	Catalina	CSS	·	1.9 km	MPC · JPL
164455	2006 DY_{66}	—	February 22, 2006	Anderson Mesa	LONEOS	·	2.1 km	MPC · JPL
164456	2006 DG_{88}	—	February 24, 2006	Kitt Peak	Spacewatch	·	1.0 km	MPC · JPL
164457	2006 DN_{89}	—	February 24, 2006	Kitt Peak	Spacewatch	·	1.9 km	MPC · JPL
164458	2006 DN_{91}	—	February 24, 2006	Kitt Peak	Spacewatch	·	3.3 km	MPC · JPL
164459	2006 DX_{97}	—	February 24, 2006	Kitt Peak	Spacewatch	·	2.6 km	MPC · JPL
164460	2006 DS_{113}	—	February 27, 2006	Kitt Peak	Spacewatch	·	1.7 km	MPC · JPL
164461	2006 DR_{129}	—	February 25, 2006	Kitt Peak	Spacewatch	·	1.2 km	MPC · JPL
164462	2006 DW_{148}	—	February 25, 2006	Kitt Peak	Spacewatch	NYS	1.6 km	MPC · JPL
164463	2006 DE_{152}	—	February 25, 2006	Kitt Peak	Spacewatch	·	2.0 km	MPC · JPL
164464	2006 DE_{153}	—	February 25, 2006	Kitt Peak	Spacewatch	·	1.3 km	MPC · JPL
164465	2006 DX_{153}	—	February 25, 2006	Kitt Peak	Spacewatch	·	3.0 km	MPC · JPL
164466	2006 DS_{156}	—	February 27, 2006	Kitt Peak	Spacewatch	·	2.4 km	MPC · JPL
164467	2006 DN_{193}	—	February 27, 2006	Kitt Peak	Spacewatch	·	6.1 km	MPC · JPL
164468	2006 DS_{197}	—	February 24, 2006	Palomar	NEAT	·	1.2 km	MPC · JPL
164469	2006 DC_{199}	—	February 28, 2006	Socorro	LINEAR	(2076)	1.2 km	MPC · JPL
164470	2006 DN_{200}	—	February 24, 2006	Palomar	NEAT	V	1 km	MPC · JPL
164471	2006 DP_{207}	—	February 25, 2006	Mount Lemmon	Mount Lemmon Survey	·	1.0 km	MPC · JPL
164472	2006 DE_{210}	—	February 20, 2006	Kitt Peak	Spacewatch	·	1.1 km	MPC · JPL
164473	2006 EV_{1}	—	March 3, 2006	Nyukasa	Japan Aerospace Exploration Agency	MAS	1.1 km	MPC · JPL
164474	2006 EB_{16}	—	March 2, 2006	Kitt Peak	Spacewatch	MAS	1.2 km	MPC · JPL
164475	2006 EV_{19}	—	March 2, 2006	Kitt Peak	Spacewatch	·	1.1 km	MPC · JPL
164476	2006 EM_{25}	—	March 3, 2006	Kitt Peak	Spacewatch	·	1.8 km	MPC · JPL
164477	2006 EF_{30}	—	March 3, 2006	Socorro	LINEAR	·	1.2 km	MPC · JPL
164478	2006 FO_{8}	—	March 23, 2006	Mount Lemmon	Mount Lemmon Survey	·	1.6 km	MPC · JPL
164479	2006 FT_{15}	—	March 23, 2006	Kitt Peak	Spacewatch	·	2.1 km	MPC · JPL
164480	2006 FZ_{21}	—	March 24, 2006	Mount Lemmon	Mount Lemmon Survey	·	920 m	MPC · JPL
164481	2006 FN_{23}	—	March 24, 2006	Kitt Peak	Spacewatch	THM	4.0 km	MPC · JPL
164482	2006 FG_{24}	—	March 24, 2006	Kitt Peak	Spacewatch	·	2.4 km	MPC · JPL
164483	2006 FV_{26}	—	March 24, 2006	Socorro	LINEAR	·	1.2 km	MPC · JPL
164484	2006 FO_{31}	—	March 25, 2006	Kitt Peak	Spacewatch	THM	3.5 km	MPC · JPL
164485	2006 FV_{32}	—	March 25, 2006	Kitt Peak	Spacewatch	AGN	1.6 km	MPC · JPL
164486	2006 FR_{34}	—	March 25, 2006	Palomar	NEAT	·	3.0 km	MPC · JPL
164487	2006 FB_{35}	—	March 23, 2006	Catalina	CSS	·	1.1 km	MPC · JPL
164488	2006 FP_{40}	—	March 26, 2006	Kitt Peak	Spacewatch	·	1.1 km	MPC · JPL
164489	2006 FR_{41}	—	March 26, 2006	Mount Lemmon	Mount Lemmon Survey	·	1.9 km	MPC · JPL
164490	2006 FD_{45}	—	March 24, 2006	Mount Lemmon	Mount Lemmon Survey	·	2.8 km	MPC · JPL
164491	2006 FB_{46}	—	March 25, 2006	Palomar	NEAT	·	4.2 km	MPC · JPL
164492	2006 FS_{49}	—	March 25, 2006	Catalina	CSS	·	7.5 km	MPC · JPL
164493	2006 FF_{50}	—	March 23, 2006	Catalina	CSS	·	7.6 km	MPC · JPL
164494	2006 FY_{52}	—	March 26, 2006	Mount Lemmon	Mount Lemmon Survey	·	1.4 km	MPC · JPL
164495	2006 FG_{53}	—	March 25, 2006	Kitt Peak	Spacewatch	·	1.7 km	MPC · JPL
164496	2006 GD_{14}	—	April 2, 2006	Kitt Peak	Spacewatch	·	1.4 km	MPC · JPL
164497	2006 GR_{27}	—	April 2, 2006	Kitt Peak	Spacewatch	·	3.0 km	MPC · JPL
164498	2006 GP_{29}	—	April 2, 2006	Kitt Peak	Spacewatch	·	1.2 km	MPC · JPL
164499	2006 GO_{34}	—	April 7, 2006	Catalina	CSS	EUN	1.7 km	MPC · JPL
164500	2006 GZ_{34}	—	April 7, 2006	Kitt Peak	Spacewatch	·	4.3 km	MPC · JPL

== 164501–164600 ==
back to top

Designation			Discovery			Properties		Ref
Permanent	Provisional	Named after	Date	Site	Discoverer(s)	Category	Diam.	Ref
164501	2006 GK_{35}	—	April 7, 2006	Catalina	CSS	·	1.3 km	MPC · JPL
164502	2006 GM_{35}	—	April 7, 2006	Catalina	CSS	V	1.1 km	MPC · JPL
164503	2006 GY_{38}	—	April 7, 2006	Socorro	LINEAR	·	1.6 km	MPC · JPL
164504	2006 GT_{41}	—	April 7, 2006	Anderson Mesa	LONEOS	·	3.3 km	MPC · JPL
164505	2006 GP_{44}	—	April 2, 2006	Mount Lemmon	Mount Lemmon Survey	·	1.9 km	MPC · JPL
164506	2006 GO_{45}	—	April 7, 2006	Socorro	LINEAR	TIN	3.5 km	MPC · JPL
164507	2006 GU_{45}	—	April 8, 2006	Kitt Peak	Spacewatch	·	1.9 km	MPC · JPL
164508	2006 GH_{51}	—	April 5, 2006	Siding Spring	SSS	·	7.1 km	MPC · JPL
164509	2006 GH_{53}	—	April 2, 2006	Catalina	CSS	·	7.4 km	MPC · JPL
164510	2006 GB_{54}	—	April 2, 2006	Mount Lemmon	Mount Lemmon Survey	·	2.7 km	MPC · JPL
164511	2006 HO_{1}	—	April 18, 2006	Catalina	CSS	·	5.4 km	MPC · JPL
164512	2006 HG_{2}	—	April 18, 2006	Palomar	NEAT	·	7.6 km	MPC · JPL
164513	2006 HT_{7}	—	April 19, 2006	Palomar	NEAT	·	7.2 km	MPC · JPL
164514	2006 HS_{10}	—	April 19, 2006	Kitt Peak	Spacewatch	·	2.9 km	MPC · JPL
164515	2006 HR_{13}	—	April 19, 2006	Anderson Mesa	LONEOS	·	2.6 km	MPC · JPL
164516	2006 HT_{13}	—	April 19, 2006	Palomar	NEAT	·	1.2 km	MPC · JPL
164517	2006 HZ_{16}	—	April 20, 2006	Kitt Peak	Spacewatch	·	2.8 km	MPC · JPL
164518 Patoche	2006 HN_{18}	Patoche	April 19, 2006	Saint-Sulpice	B. Christophe	·	2.0 km	MPC · JPL
164519	2006 HP_{24}	—	April 20, 2006	Kitt Peak	Spacewatch	·	1.5 km	MPC · JPL
164520	2006 HX_{28}	—	April 21, 2006	Catalina	CSS	·	2.2 km	MPC · JPL
164521	2006 HC_{36}	—	April 20, 2006	Kitt Peak	Spacewatch	·	1.8 km	MPC · JPL
164522	2006 HU_{43}	—	April 24, 2006	Mount Lemmon	Mount Lemmon Survey	·	2.3 km	MPC · JPL
164523	2006 HF_{47}	—	April 21, 2006	Catalina	CSS	slow	5.3 km	MPC · JPL
164524	2006 HR_{60}	—	April 27, 2006	Socorro	LINEAR	·	4.7 km	MPC · JPL
164525	2006 HF_{63}	—	April 24, 2006	Kitt Peak	Spacewatch	KOR	2.3 km	MPC · JPL
164526	2006 HA_{64}	—	April 24, 2006	Kitt Peak	Spacewatch	(12739)	1.9 km	MPC · JPL
164527	2006 HT_{65}	—	April 24, 2006	Kitt Peak	Spacewatch	HOF	4.3 km	MPC · JPL
164528	2006 HB_{69}	—	April 24, 2006	Mount Lemmon	Mount Lemmon Survey	MAS	1.3 km	MPC · JPL
164529	2006 HS_{86}	—	April 28, 2006	Socorro	LINEAR	THM	3.7 km	MPC · JPL
164530	2006 HO_{89}	—	April 21, 2006	Catalina	CSS	PHO	1.6 km	MPC · JPL
164531	2006 HX_{94}	—	April 30, 2006	Kitt Peak	Spacewatch	·	1.3 km	MPC · JPL
164532	2006 HD_{97}	—	April 30, 2006	Kitt Peak	Spacewatch	MAS	1.2 km	MPC · JPL
164533	2006 HK_{99}	—	April 30, 2006	Kitt Peak	Spacewatch	·	1.9 km	MPC · JPL
164534	2006 HJ_{110}	—	April 26, 2006	Socorro	LINEAR	·	3.2 km	MPC · JPL
164535	2006 HA_{128}	—	April 25, 2006	Palomar	NEAT	·	1.5 km	MPC · JPL
164536 Davehinson	2006 HF_{150}	Davehinson	April 27, 2006	Cerro Tololo	M. W. Buie	KOR	1.6 km	MPC · JPL
164537	2006 JF_{5}	—	May 3, 2006	Mount Lemmon	Mount Lemmon Survey	·	1.4 km	MPC · JPL
164538	2006 JC_{6}	—	May 2, 2006	Nyukasa	Japan Aerospace Exploration Agency	KOR	2.0 km	MPC · JPL
164539	2006 JQ_{8}	—	May 1, 2006	Kitt Peak	Spacewatch	·	2.1 km	MPC · JPL
164540	2006 JR_{8}	—	May 1, 2006	Kitt Peak	Spacewatch	AGN	1.4 km	MPC · JPL
164541	2006 JR_{10}	—	May 1, 2006	Kitt Peak	Spacewatch	·	2.3 km	MPC · JPL
164542	2006 JO_{15}	—	May 2, 2006	Mount Lemmon	Mount Lemmon Survey	·	2.7 km	MPC · JPL
164543	2006 JK_{19}	—	May 2, 2006	Mount Lemmon	Mount Lemmon Survey	KOR	1.8 km	MPC · JPL
164544	2006 JU_{29}	—	May 3, 2006	Kitt Peak	Spacewatch	·	3.5 km	MPC · JPL
164545	2006 JU_{30}	—	May 3, 2006	Mount Lemmon	Mount Lemmon Survey	·	1.8 km	MPC · JPL
164546	2006 JY_{39}	—	May 6, 2006	Mount Lemmon	Mount Lemmon Survey	KOR	2.3 km	MPC · JPL
164547	2006 JY_{43}	—	May 6, 2006	Kitt Peak	Spacewatch	·	1.5 km	MPC · JPL
164548	2006 JC_{48}	—	May 5, 2006	Anderson Mesa	LONEOS	·	2.7 km	MPC · JPL
164549	2006 JE_{58}	—	May 6, 2006	Siding Spring	SSS	·	3.5 km	MPC · JPL
164550	2006 KP	—	May 17, 2006	Palomar	NEAT	·	1.7 km	MPC · JPL
164551	2006 KM_{1}	—	May 19, 2006	Reedy Creek	J. Broughton	(5)	3.4 km	MPC · JPL
164552	2006 KJ_{6}	—	May 19, 2006	Mount Lemmon	Mount Lemmon Survey	·	1.8 km	MPC · JPL
164553	2006 KW_{7}	—	May 19, 2006	Mount Lemmon	Mount Lemmon Survey	·	1.2 km	MPC · JPL
164554	2006 KU_{9}	—	May 19, 2006	Catalina	CSS	·	3.5 km	MPC · JPL
164555	2006 KZ_{16}	—	May 20, 2006	Catalina	CSS	·	7.6 km	MPC · JPL
164556	2006 KN_{17}	—	May 20, 2006	Palomar	NEAT	·	4.0 km	MPC · JPL
164557	2006 KQ_{22}	—	May 20, 2006	Catalina	CSS	·	4.3 km	MPC · JPL
164558	2006 KA_{27}	—	May 20, 2006	Catalina	CSS	·	4.1 km	MPC · JPL
164559	2006 KJ_{42}	—	May 20, 2006	Kitt Peak	Spacewatch	·	5.8 km	MPC · JPL
164560	2006 KW_{45}	—	May 21, 2006	Mount Lemmon	Mount Lemmon Survey	·	2.2 km	MPC · JPL
164561	2006 KZ_{47}	—	May 21, 2006	Kitt Peak	Spacewatch	·	3.5 km	MPC · JPL
164562	2006 KB_{50}	—	May 21, 2006	Kitt Peak	Spacewatch	·	2.5 km	MPC · JPL
164563	2006 KO_{52}	—	May 21, 2006	Kitt Peak	Spacewatch	·	2.0 km	MPC · JPL
164564	2006 KY_{52}	—	May 21, 2006	Kitt Peak	Spacewatch	·	2.8 km	MPC · JPL
164565	2006 KE_{59}	—	May 22, 2006	Kitt Peak	Spacewatch	·	2.5 km	MPC · JPL
164566	2006 KL_{68}	—	May 20, 2006	Mount Lemmon	Mount Lemmon Survey	·	3.0 km	MPC · JPL
164567	2006 KL_{73}	—	May 23, 2006	Kitt Peak	Spacewatch	·	3.2 km	MPC · JPL
164568	2006 KU_{82}	—	May 19, 2006	Mount Lemmon	Mount Lemmon Survey	·	1.4 km	MPC · JPL
164569	2006 KX_{82}	—	May 19, 2006	Mount Lemmon	Mount Lemmon Survey	·	1.5 km	MPC · JPL
164570	2006 KP_{91}	—	May 25, 2006	Kitt Peak	Spacewatch	·	2.2 km	MPC · JPL
164571	2006 KB_{108}	—	May 31, 2006	Mount Lemmon	Mount Lemmon Survey	·	4.3 km	MPC · JPL
164572	2006 KD_{122}	—	May 24, 2006	Palomar	NEAT	·	6.3 km	MPC · JPL
164573	2006 KK_{122}	—	May 28, 2006	Socorro	LINEAR	·	2.4 km	MPC · JPL
164574	2006 MQ_{4}	—	June 17, 2006	Kitt Peak	Spacewatch	·	4.5 km	MPC · JPL
164575	2006 MF_{9}	—	June 19, 2006	Mount Lemmon	Mount Lemmon Survey	HYG	5.0 km	MPC · JPL
164576	2006 SV_{28}	—	September 17, 2006	Kitt Peak	Spacewatch	URS	5.0 km	MPC · JPL
164577	2006 SQ_{124}	—	September 19, 2006	Catalina	CSS	·	6.9 km	MPC · JPL
164578	2006 SW_{159}	—	September 23, 2006	Kitt Peak	Spacewatch	MAS	1.1 km	MPC · JPL
164579	2006 SW_{353}	—	September 30, 2006	Catalina	CSS	V	790 m	MPC · JPL
164580	2006 SN_{356}	—	September 30, 2006	Catalina	CSS	·	1.7 km	MPC · JPL
164581	2006 TF_{47}	—	October 12, 2006	Kitt Peak	Spacewatch	LIX	6.0 km	MPC · JPL
164582	2006 WU_{193}	—	November 27, 2006	Mount Lemmon	Mount Lemmon Survey	KOR	1.9 km	MPC · JPL
164583	2007 BO_{27}	—	January 24, 2007	Catalina	CSS	·	2.0 km	MPC · JPL
164584	2007 DG_{10}	—	February 17, 2007	Kitt Peak	Spacewatch	AST	2.3 km	MPC · JPL
164585 Oenomaos	2007 ND_{2}	Oenomaos	July 13, 2007	Marly	P. Kocher	L4	20 km	MPC · JPL
164586 Arlette	2007 NL_{4}	Arlette	July 14, 2007	Marly	P. Kocher	·	1.7 km	MPC · JPL
164587 Taesch	2007 OS	Taesch	July 17, 2007	Chante-Perdrix	C. Rinner	·	5.0 km	MPC · JPL
164588	2007 PP	—	August 3, 2007	Eskridge	Farpoint	·	1.7 km	MPC · JPL
164589 La Sagra	2007 PC_{11}	La Sagra	August 11, 2007	OAM	OAM	·	1.8 km	MPC · JPL
164590	2007 PF_{25}	—	August 11, 2007	Reedy Creek	J. Broughton	MIS	3.4 km	MPC · JPL
164591	2569 P-L	—	September 24, 1960	Palomar	C. J. van Houten, I. van Houten-Groeneveld, T. Gehrels	·	2.6 km	MPC · JPL
164592	2761 P-L	—	September 24, 1960	Palomar	C. J. van Houten, I. van Houten-Groeneveld, T. Gehrels	ERI	4.2 km	MPC · JPL
164593	4114 P-L	—	September 24, 1960	Palomar	C. J. van Houten, I. van Houten-Groeneveld, T. Gehrels	·	3.4 km	MPC · JPL
164594	4144 P-L	—	September 24, 1960	Palomar	C. J. van Houten, I. van Houten-Groeneveld, T. Gehrels	·	2.3 km	MPC · JPL
164595	4791 P-L	—	September 24, 1960	Palomar	C. J. van Houten, I. van Houten-Groeneveld, T. Gehrels	MAS	880 m	MPC · JPL
164596	4802 P-L	—	September 24, 1960	Palomar	C. J. van Houten, I. van Houten-Groeneveld, T. Gehrels	LUT	7.2 km	MPC · JPL
164597	6025 P-L	—	September 24, 1960	Palomar	C. J. van Houten, I. van Houten-Groeneveld, T. Gehrels	·	1.3 km	MPC · JPL
164598	6252 P-L	—	September 24, 1960	Palomar	C. J. van Houten, I. van Houten-Groeneveld, T. Gehrels	·	1.9 km	MPC · JPL
164599	6366 P-L	—	September 24, 1960	Palomar	C. J. van Houten, I. van Houten-Groeneveld, T. Gehrels	DOR	3.7 km	MPC · JPL
164600	1060 T-2	—	September 29, 1973	Palomar	C. J. van Houten, I. van Houten-Groeneveld, T. Gehrels	EUN	1.9 km	MPC · JPL

== 164601–164700 ==
back to top

Designation			Discovery			Properties		Ref
Permanent	Provisional	Named after	Date	Site	Discoverer(s)	Category	Diam.	Ref
164601	1123 T-2	—	September 29, 1973	Palomar	C. J. van Houten, I. van Houten-Groeneveld, T. Gehrels	·	1.5 km	MPC · JPL
164602	1301 T-2	—	September 29, 1973	Palomar	C. J. van Houten, I. van Houten-Groeneveld, T. Gehrels	·	1.2 km	MPC · JPL
164603	1422 T-2	—	September 29, 1973	Palomar	C. J. van Houten, I. van Houten-Groeneveld, T. Gehrels	·	1.3 km	MPC · JPL
164604	2054 T-2	—	September 29, 1973	Palomar	C. J. van Houten, I. van Houten-Groeneveld, T. Gehrels	·	4.6 km	MPC · JPL
164605	4097 T-2	—	September 29, 1973	Palomar	C. J. van Houten, I. van Houten-Groeneveld, T. Gehrels	·	2.9 km	MPC · JPL
164606	3167 T-3	—	October 16, 1977	Palomar	C. J. van Houten, I. van Houten-Groeneveld, T. Gehrels	·	1.8 km	MPC · JPL
164607	3273 T-3	—	October 16, 1977	Palomar	C. J. van Houten, I. van Houten-Groeneveld, T. Gehrels	MAS	1.1 km	MPC · JPL
164608	3307 T-3	—	October 16, 1977	Palomar	C. J. van Houten, I. van Houten-Groeneveld, T. Gehrels	·	1.1 km	MPC · JPL
164609	3829 T-3	—	October 16, 1977	Palomar	C. J. van Houten, I. van Houten-Groeneveld, T. Gehrels	·	980 m	MPC · JPL
164610	3840 T-3	—	October 16, 1977	Palomar	C. J. van Houten, I. van Houten-Groeneveld, T. Gehrels	KOR	2.5 km	MPC · JPL
164611	4066 T-3	—	October 16, 1977	Palomar	C. J. van Houten, I. van Houten-Groeneveld, T. Gehrels	·	2.6 km	MPC · JPL
164612	5693 T-3	—	October 16, 1977	Palomar	C. J. van Houten, I. van Houten-Groeneveld, T. Gehrels	PHO	1.6 km	MPC · JPL
164613	1981 EQ_{38}	—	March 1, 1981	Siding Spring	S. J. Bus	EUN	1.8 km	MPC · JPL
164614	1981 EJ_{41}	—	March 2, 1981	Siding Spring	S. J. Bus	·	3.9 km	MPC · JPL
164615	1981 RU_{7}	—	September 3, 1981	Palomar	S. J. Bus	·	3.4 km	MPC · JPL
164616	1986 WV_{8}	—	November 30, 1986	Kiso	H. Kosai, K. Furukawa	·	2.3 km	MPC · JPL
164617	1990 RP_{7}	—	September 13, 1990	La Silla	H. Debehogne	·	2.9 km	MPC · JPL
164618	1991 VX_{11}	—	November 8, 1991	Kitt Peak	Spacewatch	EOS	3.0 km	MPC · JPL
164619	1992 EF_{4}	—	March 1, 1992	La Silla	UESAC	·	2.5 km	MPC · JPL
164620	1992 RA_{3}	—	September 2, 1992	La Silla	E. W. Elst	NYS	1.8 km	MPC · JPL
164621	1992 SC_{4}	—	September 24, 1992	Kitt Peak	Spacewatch	MAS	1.0 km	MPC · JPL
164622	1993 FN_{5}	—	March 17, 1993	La Silla	UESAC	·	1.9 km	MPC · JPL
164623	1993 FR_{38}	—	March 19, 1993	La Silla	UESAC	·	6.3 km	MPC · JPL
164624	1993 FK_{44}	—	March 19, 1993	La Silla	UESAC	·	1.3 km	MPC · JPL
164625	1993 TC_{15}	—	October 9, 1993	La Silla	E. W. Elst	HOF	4.4 km	MPC · JPL
164626	1993 TL_{41}	—	October 9, 1993	La Silla	E. W. Elst	·	2.9 km	MPC · JPL
164627	1993 UT_{7}	—	October 20, 1993	La Silla	E. W. Elst	·	1.2 km	MPC · JPL
164628	1993 UX_{7}	—	October 20, 1993	La Silla	E. W. Elst	·	1.5 km	MPC · JPL
164629	1994 AB_{13}	—	January 11, 1994	Kitt Peak	Spacewatch	3:2	7.8 km	MPC · JPL
164630	1994 PO_{6}	—	August 10, 1994	La Silla	E. W. Elst	·	2.2 km	MPC · JPL
164631	1994 RF_{9}	—	September 12, 1994	Kitt Peak	Spacewatch	·	4.3 km	MPC · JPL
164632	1994 RM_{14}	—	September 3, 1994	La Silla	E. W. Elst	·	1.0 km	MPC · JPL
164633	1994 SW_{4}	—	September 28, 1994	Kitt Peak	Spacewatch	·	2.3 km	MPC · JPL
164634	1994 UB_{6}	—	October 28, 1994	Kitt Peak	Spacewatch	·	2.5 km	MPC · JPL
164635	1994 WW_{8}	—	November 28, 1994	Kitt Peak	Spacewatch	ADE	3.4 km	MPC · JPL
164636	1995 BR_{8}	—	January 29, 1995	Kitt Peak	Spacewatch	·	1.1 km	MPC · JPL
164637	1995 CC_{10}	—	February 4, 1995	Kitt Peak	Spacewatch	·	1.1 km	MPC · JPL
164638	1995 FW_{17}	—	March 29, 1995	Kitt Peak	Spacewatch	·	2.5 km	MPC · JPL
164639	1995 FZ_{18}	—	March 29, 1995	Kitt Peak	Spacewatch	·	2.5 km	MPC · JPL
164640	1995 GN_{4}	—	April 5, 1995	Kitt Peak	Spacewatch	NYS	1.3 km	MPC · JPL
164641	1995 MK_{4}	—	June 29, 1995	Kitt Peak	Spacewatch	·	4.5 km	MPC · JPL
164642	1995 SJ_{7}	—	September 17, 1995	Kitt Peak	Spacewatch	·	1.2 km	MPC · JPL
164643	1995 SU_{12}	—	September 18, 1995	Kitt Peak	Spacewatch	·	4.6 km	MPC · JPL
164644	1995 SH_{14}	—	September 18, 1995	Kitt Peak	Spacewatch	·	3.7 km	MPC · JPL
164645	1995 SS_{65}	—	September 26, 1995	Kitt Peak	Spacewatch	·	4.7 km	MPC · JPL
164646	1995 SU_{86}	—	September 26, 1995	Kitt Peak	Spacewatch	·	1.7 km	MPC · JPL
164647	1995 UX_{25}	—	October 20, 1995	Kitt Peak	Spacewatch	·	3.7 km	MPC · JPL
164648	1995 UG_{33}	—	October 21, 1995	Kitt Peak	Spacewatch	·	4.6 km	MPC · JPL
164649	1995 VA_{18}	—	November 15, 1995	Kitt Peak	Spacewatch	·	2.1 km	MPC · JPL
164650	1995 WT_{36}	—	November 21, 1995	Kitt Peak	Spacewatch	·	2.3 km	MPC · JPL
164651	1996 AM_{7}	—	January 12, 1996	Kitt Peak	Spacewatch	·	2.0 km	MPC · JPL
164652	1996 AD_{13}	—	January 15, 1996	Kitt Peak	Spacewatch	·	2.4 km	MPC · JPL
164653	1996 FS_{14}	—	March 19, 1996	Kitt Peak	Spacewatch	·	940 m	MPC · JPL
164654	1996 GM_{16}	—	April 14, 1996	Kitt Peak	Spacewatch	·	3.4 km	MPC · JPL
164655	1996 HR_{1}	—	April 22, 1996	Haleakala	AMOS	·	1.0 km	MPC · JPL
164656	1996 RP_{5}	—	September 15, 1996	Xinglong	SCAP	·	1.7 km	MPC · JPL
164657	1996 RU_{6}	—	September 5, 1996	Kitt Peak	Spacewatch	·	2.7 km	MPC · JPL
164658	1996 RG_{9}	—	September 7, 1996	Kitt Peak	Spacewatch	URS	6.4 km	MPC · JPL
164659	1996 RT_{13}	—	September 8, 1996	Kitt Peak	Spacewatch	HYG	5.7 km	MPC · JPL
164660	1996 RE_{16}	—	September 13, 1996	Kitt Peak	Spacewatch	NYS	1.7 km	MPC · JPL
164661	1996 ST_{7}	—	September 17, 1996	Xinglong	SCAP	·	4.5 km	MPC · JPL
164662	1996 TC_{9}	—	October 13, 1996	Needville	Dillon, W. G., Pepper, R.	EOS	2.9 km	MPC · JPL
164663	1996 TQ_{13}	—	October 5, 1996	Xinglong	SCAP	MAS	900 m	MPC · JPL
164664	1996 TH_{17}	—	October 4, 1996	Kitt Peak	Spacewatch	·	1.6 km	MPC · JPL
164665	1996 TO_{20}	—	October 5, 1996	Kitt Peak	Spacewatch	·	4.8 km	MPC · JPL
164666	1996 TB_{30}	—	October 7, 1996	Kitt Peak	Spacewatch	MAS	1.1 km	MPC · JPL
164667	1996 TA_{36}	—	October 11, 1996	Kitt Peak	Spacewatch	MAS	1.3 km	MPC · JPL
164668	1996 TP_{56}	—	October 2, 1996	La Silla	E. W. Elst	·	1.8 km	MPC · JPL
164669	1996 VJ_{23}	—	November 10, 1996	Kitt Peak	Spacewatch	·	4.9 km	MPC · JPL
164670	1996 XM_{6}	—	December 3, 1996	Nachi-Katsuura	Y. Shimizu, T. Urata	·	2.2 km	MPC · JPL
164671	1996 XC_{12}	—	December 4, 1996	Kitt Peak	Spacewatch	·	2.3 km	MPC · JPL
164672	1996 XX_{29}	—	December 14, 1996	Kitt Peak	Spacewatch	MAS	1.2 km	MPC · JPL
164673	1997 BR_{4}	—	January 31, 1997	Kitt Peak	Spacewatch	CYB	6.6 km	MPC · JPL
164674	1997 EV_{4}	—	March 2, 1997	Kitt Peak	Spacewatch	·	4.6 km	MPC · JPL
164675	1997 EK_{5}	—	March 4, 1997	Kitt Peak	Spacewatch	·	2.4 km	MPC · JPL
164676 Oliviabaraldi	1997 EL_{7}	Oliviabaraldi	March 2, 1997	Bologna	San Vittore	·	3.8 km	MPC · JPL
164677	1997 GA_{4}	—	April 8, 1997	Kleť	Kleť	·	2.5 km	MPC · JPL
164678	1997 GR_{4}	—	April 7, 1997	Kitt Peak	Spacewatch	·	1.8 km	MPC · JPL
164679	1997 GJ_{12}	—	April 3, 1997	Socorro	LINEAR	·	2.0 km	MPC · JPL
164680	1997 GO_{20}	—	April 5, 1997	Socorro	LINEAR	·	2.5 km	MPC · JPL
164681	1997 KA_{1}	—	May 27, 1997	Caussols	ODAS	EUN	2.3 km	MPC · JPL
164682	1997 LQ_{1}	—	June 1, 1997	Kitt Peak	Spacewatch	·	3.4 km	MPC · JPL
164683	1997 LH_{3}	—	June 5, 1997	Kitt Peak	Spacewatch	(7744)	2.1 km	MPC · JPL
164684	1997 LS_{4}	—	June 7, 1997	Kitt Peak	Spacewatch	·	2.0 km	MPC · JPL
164685	1997 LH_{13}	—	June 7, 1997	La Silla	E. W. Elst	·	1.1 km	MPC · JPL
164686	1997 MW_{5}	—	June 26, 1997	Kitt Peak	Spacewatch	·	3.4 km	MPC · JPL
164687	1997 ME_{6}	—	June 26, 1997	Kitt Peak	Spacewatch	·	3.6 km	MPC · JPL
164688	1997 SO_{1}	—	September 21, 1997	Ondřejov	L. Kotková	·	1.1 km	MPC · JPL
164689	1997 SC_{7}	—	September 23, 1997	Kitt Peak	Spacewatch	·	2.4 km	MPC · JPL
164690	1997 SH_{8}	—	September 23, 1997	Kitt Peak	Spacewatch	·	1.3 km	MPC · JPL
164691	1997 SH_{14}	—	September 28, 1997	Kitt Peak	Spacewatch	·	980 m	MPC · JPL
164692	1997 TM_{21}	—	October 4, 1997	Kitt Peak	Spacewatch	·	2.3 km	MPC · JPL
164693	1997 TC_{24}	—	October 11, 1997	Kitt Peak	Spacewatch	·	1.2 km	MPC · JPL
164694	1997 UC_{16}	—	October 23, 1997	Kitt Peak	Spacewatch	·	820 m	MPC · JPL
164695	1997 UJ_{16}	—	October 23, 1997	Kitt Peak	Spacewatch	·	2.1 km	MPC · JPL
164696	1997 WB_{8}	—	November 23, 1997	Chichibu	N. Satō	EOS	7.2 km	MPC · JPL
164697	1997 WS_{28}	—	November 28, 1997	Kitt Peak	Spacewatch	·	1.3 km	MPC · JPL
164698	1997 WA_{47}	—	November 26, 1997	Socorro	LINEAR	·	3.3 km	MPC · JPL
164699	1997 XV_{6}	—	December 5, 1997	Caussols	ODAS	·	3.1 km	MPC · JPL
164700	1998 AO_{4}	—	January 6, 1998	Kitt Peak	Spacewatch	V	1.1 km	MPC · JPL

== 164701–164800 ==
back to top

Designation			Discovery			Properties		Ref
Permanent	Provisional	Named after	Date	Site	Discoverer(s)	Category	Diam.	Ref
164701 Horanyi	1998 AX_{9}	Horanyi	January 7, 1998	Anderson Mesa	M. W. Buie	·	2.0 km	MPC · JPL
164702	1998 BH_{6}	—	January 22, 1998	Kitt Peak	Spacewatch	MAS	1.2 km	MPC · JPL
164703	1998 BN_{20}	—	January 22, 1998	Kitt Peak	Spacewatch	·	4.6 km	MPC · JPL
164704	1998 BF_{31}	—	January 26, 1998	Kitt Peak	Spacewatch	·	1.4 km	MPC · JPL
164705	1998 DE_{2}	—	February 17, 1998	Kitt Peak	Spacewatch	·	1.7 km	MPC · JPL
164706	1998 DJ_{19}	—	February 24, 1998	Kitt Peak	Spacewatch	V	930 m	MPC · JPL
164707	1998 DE_{27}	—	February 26, 1998	Kitt Peak	Spacewatch	V	1.2 km	MPC · JPL
164708	1998 FX_{7}	—	March 20, 1998	Kitt Peak	Spacewatch	·	1.4 km	MPC · JPL
164709	1998 FC_{10}	—	March 24, 1998	Caussols	ODAS	·	1.6 km	MPC · JPL
164710	1998 FW_{24}	—	March 20, 1998	Socorro	LINEAR	·	1.5 km	MPC · JPL
164711	1998 FD_{42}	—	March 20, 1998	Socorro	LINEAR	·	2.7 km	MPC · JPL
164712	1998 FM_{58}	—	March 20, 1998	Socorro	LINEAR	·	2.0 km	MPC · JPL
164713	1998 FK_{61}	—	March 20, 1998	Socorro	LINEAR	MAS	1.3 km	MPC · JPL
164714	1998 FN_{91}	—	March 24, 1998	Socorro	LINEAR	·	890 m	MPC · JPL
164715	1998 FZ_{139}	—	March 28, 1998	Socorro	LINEAR	·	3.5 km	MPC · JPL
164716	1998 GH	—	April 2, 1998	Socorro	LINEAR	H	1.7 km	MPC · JPL
164717	1998 GN_{1}	—	April 6, 1998	Kleť	Kleť	·	2.0 km	MPC · JPL
164718	1998 HM_{4}	—	April 21, 1998	Socorro	LINEAR	H	710 m	MPC · JPL
164719	1998 HZ_{6}	—	April 21, 1998	Socorro	LINEAR	H	820 m	MPC · JPL
164720	1998 KT_{24}	—	May 22, 1998	Socorro	LINEAR	PHO	2.1 km	MPC · JPL
164721	1998 QO_{24}	—	August 17, 1998	Socorro	LINEAR	·	2.1 km	MPC · JPL
164722	1998 QN_{68}	—	August 24, 1998	Socorro	LINEAR	·	4.5 km	MPC · JPL
164723	1998 QW_{71}	—	August 24, 1998	Socorro	LINEAR	·	4.5 km	MPC · JPL
164724	1998 QM_{78}	—	August 24, 1998	Socorro	LINEAR	MAR	2.1 km	MPC · JPL
164725	1998 QF_{98}	—	August 28, 1998	Socorro	LINEAR	·	3.4 km	MPC · JPL
164726	1998 QE_{107}	—	August 19, 1998	Xinglong	SCAP	(1547) · fast	3.5 km	MPC · JPL
164727	1998 RH_{5}	—	September 15, 1998	Caussols	ODAS	slow	2.8 km	MPC · JPL
164728	1998 RH_{12}	—	September 14, 1998	Kitt Peak	Spacewatch	·	2.3 km	MPC · JPL
164729	1998 RT_{49}	—	September 14, 1998	Socorro	LINEAR	EUN	2.4 km	MPC · JPL
164730	1998 RA_{55}	—	September 14, 1998	Socorro	LINEAR	·	2.9 km	MPC · JPL
164731	1998 RK_{64}	—	September 14, 1998	Socorro	LINEAR	·	2.6 km	MPC · JPL
164732	1998 RE_{69}	—	September 14, 1998	Socorro	LINEAR	·	3.2 km	MPC · JPL
164733	1998 RE_{70}	—	September 14, 1998	Socorro	LINEAR	·	2.6 km	MPC · JPL
164734	1998 SE_{21}	—	September 21, 1998	Kitt Peak	Spacewatch	·	3.8 km	MPC · JPL
164735	1998 SY_{24}	—	September 18, 1998	Anderson Mesa	LONEOS	·	4.5 km	MPC · JPL
164736	1998 SJ_{40}	—	September 24, 1998	Kitt Peak	Spacewatch	·	2.4 km	MPC · JPL
164737	1998 ST_{47}	—	September 26, 1998	Kitt Peak	Spacewatch	·	3.4 km	MPC · JPL
164738	1998 SP_{84}	—	September 26, 1998	Socorro	LINEAR	·	4.0 km	MPC · JPL
164739	1998 SF_{103}	—	September 26, 1998	Socorro	LINEAR	·	3.0 km	MPC · JPL
164740	1998 SJ_{106}	—	September 26, 1998	Socorro	LINEAR	·	3.0 km	MPC · JPL
164741	1998 SH_{113}	—	September 26, 1998	Socorro	LINEAR	·	2.7 km	MPC · JPL
164742	1998 SS_{138}	—	September 26, 1998	Socorro	LINEAR	·	4.0 km	MPC · JPL
164743	1998 SD_{156}	—	September 26, 1998	Socorro	LINEAR	·	3.0 km	MPC · JPL
164744	1998 SN_{162}	—	September 26, 1998	Socorro	LINEAR	·	6.5 km	MPC · JPL
164745	1998 TU_{8}	—	October 12, 1998	Kitt Peak	Spacewatch	fast	2.4 km	MPC · JPL
164746	1998 TF_{11}	—	October 13, 1998	Kitt Peak	Spacewatch	·	2.7 km	MPC · JPL
164747	1998 TP_{20}	—	October 13, 1998	Kitt Peak	Spacewatch	·	3.4 km	MPC · JPL
164748	1998 TC_{22}	—	October 13, 1998	Kitt Peak	Spacewatch	·	2.5 km	MPC · JPL
164749	1998 TP_{22}	—	October 13, 1998	Kitt Peak	Spacewatch	HOF	2.9 km	MPC · JPL
164750	1998 TW_{29}	—	October 14, 1998	Xinglong	SCAP	·	3.5 km	MPC · JPL
164751	1998 UW_{3}	—	October 20, 1998	Caussols	ODAS	·	4.0 km	MPC · JPL
164752	1998 UR_{17}	—	October 18, 1998	Xinglong	SCAP	·	3.8 km	MPC · JPL
164753	1998 UJ_{41}	—	October 28, 1998	Socorro	LINEAR	·	3.7 km	MPC · JPL
164754	1998 VQ_{10}	—	November 10, 1998	Socorro	LINEAR	·	2.9 km	MPC · JPL
164755	1998 VK_{27}	—	November 10, 1998	Socorro	LINEAR	·	3.8 km	MPC · JPL
164756	1998 VR_{35}	—	November 9, 1998	Xinglong	SCAP	·	3.7 km	MPC · JPL
164757	1998 VY_{35}	—	November 12, 1998	Xinglong	SCAP	·	2.9 km	MPC · JPL
164758	1998 VN_{37}	—	November 10, 1998	Socorro	LINEAR	·	4.6 km	MPC · JPL
164759	1998 VR_{56}	—	November 11, 1998	Anderson Mesa	LONEOS	·	2.8 km	MPC · JPL
164760	1998 WX_{2}	—	November 17, 1998	Caussols	ODAS	GEF	2.7 km	MPC · JPL
164761	1998 WU_{6}	—	November 24, 1998	Baton Rouge	W. R. Cooney Jr., P. M. Motl	·	2.6 km	MPC · JPL
164762	1998 WX_{27}	—	November 18, 1998	Kitt Peak	Spacewatch	·	3.6 km	MPC · JPL
164763	1998 WH_{29}	—	November 23, 1998	Kitt Peak	Spacewatch	·	2.6 km	MPC · JPL
164764	1998 XK_{1}	—	December 7, 1998	Caussols	ODAS	AEO	1.9 km	MPC · JPL
164765	1998 XM_{1}	—	December 7, 1998	Caussols	ODAS	·	2.2 km	MPC · JPL
164766	1998 XQ_{13}	—	December 15, 1998	Caussols	ODAS	·	2.4 km	MPC · JPL
164767	1998 YK_{4}	—	December 18, 1998	Woomera	F. B. Zoltowski	·	4.7 km	MPC · JPL
164768	1998 YE_{22}	—	December 26, 1998	Kitt Peak	Spacewatch	·	2.2 km	MPC · JPL
164769	1999 AG_{38}	—	January 9, 1999	Xinglong	SCAP	·	4.1 km	MPC · JPL
164770	1999 BN_{18}	—	January 16, 1999	Socorro	LINEAR	·	2.9 km	MPC · JPL
164771	1999 CB_{5}	—	February 12, 1999	Oohira	T. Urata	·	3.5 km	MPC · JPL
164772	1999 CV_{33}	—	February 10, 1999	Socorro	LINEAR	·	4.6 km	MPC · JPL
164773	1999 CW_{48}	—	February 10, 1999	Socorro	LINEAR	·	1.2 km	MPC · JPL
164774	1999 CA_{95}	—	February 10, 1999	Socorro	LINEAR	·	3.9 km	MPC · JPL
164775	1999 CJ_{124}	—	February 11, 1999	Socorro	LINEAR	·	3.7 km	MPC · JPL
164776	1999 CJ_{133}	—	February 7, 1999	Kitt Peak	Spacewatch	THM	5.3 km	MPC · JPL
164777	1999 CD_{142}	—	February 10, 1999	Kitt Peak	Spacewatch	·	2.9 km	MPC · JPL
164778	1999 CD_{149}	—	February 13, 1999	Kitt Peak	Spacewatch	KOR	2.2 km	MPC · JPL
164779	1999 CN_{157}	—	February 8, 1999	Kitt Peak	Spacewatch	·	5.9 km	MPC · JPL
164780	1999 CH_{159}	—	February 8, 1999	Kitt Peak	Spacewatch	·	1.2 km	MPC · JPL
164781	1999 DA_{4}	—	February 20, 1999	Goodricke-Pigott	R. A. Tucker	·	2.8 km	MPC · JPL
164782	1999 DK_{4}	—	February 16, 1999	Ondřejov	Ondrejov	·	3.1 km	MPC · JPL
164783	1999 EZ_{1}	—	March 9, 1999	Kitt Peak	Spacewatch	THM	4.5 km	MPC · JPL
164784	1999 EJ_{11}	—	March 15, 1999	Kitt Peak	Spacewatch	·	1.1 km	MPC · JPL
164785	1999 ES_{14}	—	March 14, 1999	Kitt Peak	Spacewatch	·	1.2 km	MPC · JPL
164786	1999 FZ_{1}	—	March 16, 1999	Kitt Peak	Spacewatch	·	1.3 km	MPC · JPL
164787	1999 FE_{11}	—	March 17, 1999	Kitt Peak	Spacewatch	·	1.7 km	MPC · JPL
164788	1999 FN_{12}	—	March 18, 1999	Kitt Peak	Spacewatch	THM	3.4 km	MPC · JPL
164789	1999 FV_{18}	—	March 22, 1999	Anderson Mesa	LONEOS	·	3.9 km	MPC · JPL
164790	1999 FY_{35}	—	March 20, 1999	Socorro	LINEAR	·	2.0 km	MPC · JPL
164791 Nicinski	1999 FJ_{70}	Nicinski	March 20, 1999	Apache Point	SDSS	NYS	1.4 km	MPC · JPL
164792 Owen	1999 FD_{78}	Owen	March 20, 1999	Apache Point	SDSS	·	1.3 km	MPC · JPL
164793	1999 GO_{7}	—	April 7, 1999	Anderson Mesa	LONEOS	·	1.6 km	MPC · JPL
164794	1999 GO_{10}	—	April 11, 1999	Kitt Peak	Spacewatch	·	1.4 km	MPC · JPL
164795	1999 GW_{10}	—	April 11, 1999	Kitt Peak	Spacewatch	·	3.3 km	MPC · JPL
164796	1999 GX_{13}	—	April 14, 1999	Kitt Peak	Spacewatch	·	3.2 km	MPC · JPL
164797	1999 GJ_{24}	—	April 6, 1999	Socorro	LINEAR	·	1.4 km	MPC · JPL
164798	1999 JC_{1}	—	May 7, 1999	Catalina	CSS	VER	5.4 km	MPC · JPL
164799	1999 JV_{26}	—	May 10, 1999	Socorro	LINEAR	·	1.0 km	MPC · JPL
164800	1999 JE_{32}	—	May 10, 1999	Socorro	LINEAR	NYS	1.5 km	MPC · JPL

== 164801–164900 ==
back to top

Designation			Discovery			Properties		Ref
Permanent	Provisional	Named after	Date	Site	Discoverer(s)	Category	Diam.	Ref
164801	1999 JH_{42}	—	May 10, 1999	Socorro	LINEAR	PHO	2.0 km	MPC · JPL
164802	1999 JU_{48}	—	May 10, 1999	Socorro	LINEAR	(2076)	1.5 km	MPC · JPL
164803	1999 JH_{65}	—	May 12, 1999	Socorro	LINEAR	·	2.9 km	MPC · JPL
164804	1999 JL_{75}	—	May 9, 1999	Bergisch Gladbach	W. Bickel	·	1.3 km	MPC · JPL
164805	1999 JT_{109}	—	May 13, 1999	Socorro	LINEAR	·	1.6 km	MPC · JPL
164806	1999 JA_{110}	—	May 13, 1999	Socorro	LINEAR	NYS ·	3.9 km	MPC · JPL
164807	1999 JA_{114}	—	May 13, 1999	Socorro	LINEAR	NYS	1.5 km	MPC · JPL
164808	1999 JC_{116}	—	May 13, 1999	Socorro	LINEAR	CYB	7.5 km	MPC · JPL
164809	1999 JH_{121}	—	May 13, 1999	Socorro	LINEAR	·	2.3 km	MPC · JPL
164810	1999 JN_{124}	—	May 10, 1999	Socorro	LINEAR	·	2.1 km	MPC · JPL
164811	1999 JR_{135}	—	May 7, 1999	Anderson Mesa	LONEOS	ERI	3.1 km	MPC · JPL
164812	1999 KT_{17}	—	May 17, 1999	Catalina	CSS	NYS	1.3 km	MPC · JPL
164813	1999 LC_{8}	—	June 8, 1999	Socorro	LINEAR	PHO	3.7 km	MPC · JPL
164814	1999 LR_{32}	—	June 8, 1999	Kitt Peak	Spacewatch	·	1.7 km	MPC · JPL
164815	1999 ND_{62}	—	July 13, 1999	Socorro	LINEAR	PHO	1.8 km	MPC · JPL
164816	1999 PR_{5}	—	August 12, 1999	Kitt Peak	Spacewatch	·	1.2 km	MPC · JPL
164817	1999 QW	—	August 17, 1999	Kitt Peak	Spacewatch	KON	4.6 km	MPC · JPL
164818	1999 RR_{41}	—	September 14, 1999	Kleť	Kleť	EUN	2.2 km	MPC · JPL
164819	1999 RL_{86}	—	September 7, 1999	Socorro	LINEAR	·	2.2 km	MPC · JPL
164820	1999 RR_{89}	—	September 7, 1999	Socorro	LINEAR	·	2.1 km	MPC · JPL
164821	1999 RY_{112}	—	September 9, 1999	Socorro	LINEAR	·	2.0 km	MPC · JPL
164822	1999 RV_{157}	—	September 9, 1999	Socorro	LINEAR	·	2.8 km	MPC · JPL
164823	1999 RD_{171}	—	September 9, 1999	Socorro	LINEAR	·	1.5 km	MPC · JPL
164824	1999 RS_{176}	—	September 9, 1999	Socorro	LINEAR	·	1.9 km	MPC · JPL
164825	1999 RT_{203}	—	September 8, 1999	Socorro	LINEAR	EUN	1.9 km	MPC · JPL
164826	1999 RN_{208}	—	September 8, 1999	Socorro	LINEAR	·	1.9 km	MPC · JPL
164827	1999 RN_{236}	—	September 8, 1999	Catalina	CSS	·	2.7 km	MPC · JPL
164828	1999 TL_{40}	—	October 5, 1999	Catalina	CSS	·	1.6 km	MPC · JPL
164829	1999 TE_{45}	—	October 3, 1999	Kitt Peak	Spacewatch	·	1.5 km	MPC · JPL
164830	1999 TA_{49}	—	October 4, 1999	Kitt Peak	Spacewatch	·	2.3 km	MPC · JPL
164831	1999 TL_{52}	—	October 5, 1999	Kitt Peak	Spacewatch	·	1.7 km	MPC · JPL
164832	1999 TL_{55}	—	October 6, 1999	Kitt Peak	Spacewatch	·	2.0 km	MPC · JPL
164833	1999 TR_{62}	—	October 7, 1999	Kitt Peak	Spacewatch	·	1.7 km	MPC · JPL
164834	1999 TL_{64}	—	October 8, 1999	Kitt Peak	Spacewatch	·	1.5 km	MPC · JPL
164835	1999 TS_{67}	—	October 8, 1999	Kitt Peak	Spacewatch	·	1.9 km	MPC · JPL
164836	1999 TW_{75}	—	October 10, 1999	Kitt Peak	Spacewatch	(5)	1.3 km	MPC · JPL
164837	1999 TY_{81}	—	October 12, 1999	Kitt Peak	Spacewatch	·	1.6 km	MPC · JPL
164838	1999 TH_{83}	—	October 12, 1999	Kitt Peak	Spacewatch	·	2.0 km	MPC · JPL
164839	1999 TX_{86}	—	October 15, 1999	Kitt Peak	Spacewatch	MAS	1.1 km	MPC · JPL
164840	1999 TK_{88}	—	October 15, 1999	Socorro	LINEAR	·	1.5 km	MPC · JPL
164841	1999 TV_{112}	—	October 4, 1999	Socorro	LINEAR	·	3.5 km	MPC · JPL
164842	1999 TV_{133}	—	October 6, 1999	Socorro	LINEAR	·	1.6 km	MPC · JPL
164843	1999 TH_{138}	—	October 6, 1999	Socorro	LINEAR	3:2 · SHU	7.2 km	MPC · JPL
164844	1999 TV_{143}	—	October 7, 1999	Socorro	LINEAR	T_{j} (2.99) · HIL · 3:2 · (6124)	9.0 km	MPC · JPL
164845	1999 TT_{149}	—	October 7, 1999	Socorro	LINEAR	·	1.9 km	MPC · JPL
164846	1999 TT_{152}	—	October 7, 1999	Socorro	LINEAR	(5)	2.2 km	MPC · JPL
164847	1999 TC_{153}	—	October 7, 1999	Socorro	LINEAR	H	920 m	MPC · JPL
164848	1999 TM_{156}	—	October 7, 1999	Socorro	LINEAR	EUN	1.8 km	MPC · JPL
164849	1999 TW_{163}	—	October 9, 1999	Socorro	LINEAR	·	2.1 km	MPC · JPL
164850	1999 TF_{171}	—	October 10, 1999	Socorro	LINEAR	·	2.1 km	MPC · JPL
164851	1999 TK_{171}	—	October 10, 1999	Socorro	LINEAR	(5)	1.4 km	MPC · JPL
164852	1999 TT_{174}	—	October 10, 1999	Socorro	LINEAR	·	3.7 km	MPC · JPL
164853	1999 TQ_{198}	—	October 12, 1999	Socorro	LINEAR	·	3.0 km	MPC · JPL
164854	1999 TK_{204}	—	October 13, 1999	Socorro	LINEAR	H	870 m	MPC · JPL
164855	1999 TO_{204}	—	October 13, 1999	Socorro	LINEAR	·	3.5 km	MPC · JPL
164856	1999 TJ_{210}	—	October 14, 1999	Socorro	LINEAR	EUN	2.5 km	MPC · JPL
164857	1999 TC_{215}	—	October 15, 1999	Socorro	LINEAR	·	1.8 km	MPC · JPL
164858	1999 TX_{215}	—	October 15, 1999	Socorro	LINEAR	3:2 · SHU	9.7 km	MPC · JPL
164859	1999 TA_{218}	—	October 15, 1999	Socorro	LINEAR	·	2.1 km	MPC · JPL
164860	1999 TA_{241}	—	October 4, 1999	Catalina	CSS	·	1.3 km	MPC · JPL
164861	1999 TL_{260}	—	October 10, 1999	Socorro	LINEAR	·	1.9 km	MPC · JPL
164862	1999 TD_{262}	—	October 13, 1999	Socorro	LINEAR	·	1.4 km	MPC · JPL
164863	1999 TN_{269}	—	October 3, 1999	Socorro	LINEAR	·	2.7 km	MPC · JPL
164864	1999 TH_{272}	—	October 3, 1999	Socorro	LINEAR	BRG	2.0 km	MPC · JPL
164865	1999 TA_{273}	—	October 3, 1999	Socorro	LINEAR	H	1.2 km	MPC · JPL
164866	1999 TK_{278}	—	October 6, 1999	Socorro	LINEAR	·	2.2 km	MPC · JPL
164867	1999 TH_{287}	—	October 10, 1999	Socorro	LINEAR	H	870 m	MPC · JPL
164868	1999 TU_{309}	—	October 3, 1999	Kitt Peak	Spacewatch	·	1.7 km	MPC · JPL
164869	1999 UJ_{11}	—	October 31, 1999	Bergisch Gladbach	W. Bickel	·	1.8 km	MPC · JPL
164870	1999 UD_{14}	—	October 29, 1999	Catalina	CSS	EUN	2.0 km	MPC · JPL
164871	1999 UE_{20}	—	October 31, 1999	Kitt Peak	Spacewatch	(5)	1.6 km	MPC · JPL
164872	1999 UJ_{31}	—	October 31, 1999	Kitt Peak	Spacewatch	·	1.9 km	MPC · JPL
164873	1999 UO_{36}	—	October 16, 1999	Kitt Peak	Spacewatch	·	1.3 km	MPC · JPL
164874	1999 UL_{37}	—	October 16, 1999	Kitt Peak	Spacewatch	·	2.3 km	MPC · JPL
164875	1999 UA_{38}	—	October 16, 1999	Kitt Peak	Spacewatch	·	1.5 km	MPC · JPL
164876	1999 UB_{49}	—	October 31, 1999	Catalina	CSS	·	2.0 km	MPC · JPL
164877	1999 UQ_{49}	—	October 30, 1999	Catalina	CSS	·	2.3 km	MPC · JPL
164878	1999 VA_{14}	—	November 2, 1999	Socorro	LINEAR	H	850 m	MPC · JPL
164879	1999 VK_{18}	—	November 2, 1999	Kitt Peak	Spacewatch	(5)	1.1 km	MPC · JPL
164880	1999 VN_{26}	—	November 3, 1999	Socorro	LINEAR	·	2.1 km	MPC · JPL
164881	1999 VT_{30}	—	November 3, 1999	Socorro	LINEAR	·	4.4 km	MPC · JPL
164882	1999 VB_{42}	—	November 4, 1999	Kitt Peak	Spacewatch	(5)	1.6 km	MPC · JPL
164883	1999 VQ_{65}	—	November 4, 1999	Socorro	LINEAR	·	1.9 km	MPC · JPL
164884	1999 VW_{76}	—	November 5, 1999	Kitt Peak	Spacewatch	·	1.6 km	MPC · JPL
164885	1999 VU_{79}	—	November 4, 1999	Socorro	LINEAR	(5)	1.8 km	MPC · JPL
164886	1999 VX_{81}	—	November 5, 1999	Socorro	LINEAR	(5)	2.2 km	MPC · JPL
164887	1999 VT_{84}	—	November 6, 1999	Kitt Peak	Spacewatch	·	1.4 km	MPC · JPL
164888	1999 VK_{86}	—	November 5, 1999	Socorro	LINEAR	·	2.2 km	MPC · JPL
164889	1999 VN_{93}	—	November 9, 1999	Socorro	LINEAR	·	2.0 km	MPC · JPL
164890	1999 VL_{101}	—	November 9, 1999	Socorro	LINEAR	·	1.9 km	MPC · JPL
164891	1999 VD_{104}	—	November 9, 1999	Socorro	LINEAR	·	1.3 km	MPC · JPL
164892	1999 VD_{106}	—	November 9, 1999	Socorro	LINEAR	·	2.1 km	MPC · JPL
164893	1999 VV_{106}	—	November 9, 1999	Socorro	LINEAR	·	2.1 km	MPC · JPL
164894	1999 VR_{107}	—	November 9, 1999	Socorro	LINEAR	·	1.9 km	MPC · JPL
164895	1999 VZ_{110}	—	November 9, 1999	Socorro	LINEAR	·	1.6 km	MPC · JPL
164896	1999 VE_{116}	—	November 4, 1999	Kitt Peak	Spacewatch	·	2.2 km	MPC · JPL
164897	1999 VV_{134}	—	November 10, 1999	Kitt Peak	Spacewatch	·	2.0 km	MPC · JPL
164898	1999 VM_{159}	—	November 14, 1999	Socorro	LINEAR	·	2.5 km	MPC · JPL
164899	1999 VR_{162}	—	November 14, 1999	Socorro	LINEAR	·	1.4 km	MPC · JPL
164900	1999 VE_{181}	—	November 9, 1999	Socorro	LINEAR	H	730 m	MPC · JPL

== 164901–165000 ==
back to top

Designation			Discovery			Properties		Ref
Permanent	Provisional	Named after	Date	Site	Discoverer(s)	Category	Diam.	Ref
164901	1999 VK_{181}	—	November 9, 1999	Socorro	LINEAR	·	2.1 km	MPC · JPL
164902	1999 VT_{190}	—	November 15, 1999	Socorro	LINEAR	·	1.7 km	MPC · JPL
164903	1999 VP_{225}	—	November 5, 1999	Socorro	LINEAR	T_{j} (2.96) · HIL · 3:2	8.0 km	MPC · JPL
164904	1999 WP_{2}	—	November 26, 1999	Višnjan Observatory	K. Korlević	(5)	2.4 km	MPC · JPL
164905	1999 WU_{9}	—	November 30, 1999	Oizumi	T. Kobayashi	·	3.4 km	MPC · JPL
164906	1999 WY_{15}	—	November 29, 1999	Kitt Peak	Spacewatch	·	1.5 km	MPC · JPL
164907	1999 WL_{17}	—	November 30, 1999	Kitt Peak	Spacewatch	H	1.1 km	MPC · JPL
164908	1999 XC_{3}	—	December 4, 1999	Catalina	CSS	·	2.5 km	MPC · JPL
164909	1999 XO_{4}	—	December 4, 1999	Catalina	CSS	·	1.8 km	MPC · JPL
164910	1999 XL_{10}	—	December 5, 1999	Catalina	CSS	·	2.2 km	MPC · JPL
164911	1999 XB_{13}	—	December 5, 1999	Socorro	LINEAR	·	4.3 km	MPC · JPL
164912	1999 XP_{15}	—	December 5, 1999	Višnjan Observatory	K. Korlević	·	1.4 km	MPC · JPL
164913	1999 XK_{32}	—	December 6, 1999	Socorro	LINEAR	·	4.9 km	MPC · JPL
164914	1999 XV_{37}	—	December 7, 1999	Dynic	A. Sugie	·	1.7 km	MPC · JPL
164915	1999 XC_{38}	—	December 6, 1999	Gnosca	S. Sposetti	·	2.1 km	MPC · JPL
164916	1999 XV_{38}	—	December 5, 1999	Socorro	LINEAR	·	2.2 km	MPC · JPL
164917	1999 XF_{41}	—	December 7, 1999	Socorro	LINEAR	·	2.0 km	MPC · JPL
164918	1999 XR_{41}	—	December 7, 1999	Socorro	LINEAR	·	2.1 km	MPC · JPL
164919	1999 XD_{44}	—	December 7, 1999	Socorro	LINEAR	·	2.8 km	MPC · JPL
164920	1999 XL_{46}	—	December 7, 1999	Socorro	LINEAR	·	1.8 km	MPC · JPL
164921	1999 XW_{57}	—	December 7, 1999	Socorro	LINEAR	·	2.2 km	MPC · JPL
164922	1999 XZ_{72}	—	December 7, 1999	Socorro	LINEAR	·	3.0 km	MPC · JPL
164923	1999 XC_{77}	—	December 7, 1999	Socorro	LINEAR	·	3.3 km	MPC · JPL
164924	1999 XS_{77}	—	December 7, 1999	Socorro	LINEAR	·	2.0 km	MPC · JPL
164925	1999 XN_{79}	—	December 7, 1999	Socorro	LINEAR	·	3.4 km	MPC · JPL
164926	1999 XL_{87}	—	December 7, 1999	Socorro	LINEAR	(5)	2.3 km	MPC · JPL
164927	1999 XO_{92}	—	December 7, 1999	Socorro	LINEAR	MRX	2.0 km	MPC · JPL
164928	1999 XQ_{99}	—	December 7, 1999	Socorro	LINEAR	EUN	2.3 km	MPC · JPL
164929	1999 XK_{102}	—	December 7, 1999	Socorro	LINEAR	·	2.0 km	MPC · JPL
164930	1999 XZ_{111}	—	December 7, 1999	Socorro	LINEAR	·	1.9 km	MPC · JPL
164931	1999 XO_{113}	—	December 11, 1999	Socorro	LINEAR	·	2.2 km	MPC · JPL
164932	1999 XW_{115}	—	December 5, 1999	Catalina	CSS	·	3.3 km	MPC · JPL
164933	1999 XJ_{124}	—	December 7, 1999	Catalina	CSS	·	1.7 km	MPC · JPL
164934	1999 XV_{125}	—	December 7, 1999	Catalina	CSS	(5)	2.7 km	MPC · JPL
164935	1999 XR_{126}	—	December 7, 1999	Catalina	CSS	(5)	2.0 km	MPC · JPL
164936	1999 XX_{128}	—	December 12, 1999	Socorro	LINEAR	·	6.0 km	MPC · JPL
164937	1999 XW_{145}	—	December 7, 1999	Kitt Peak	Spacewatch	·	2.0 km	MPC · JPL
164938	1999 XU_{151}	—	December 7, 1999	Kitt Peak	Spacewatch	(5)	4.8 km	MPC · JPL
164939	1999 XT_{155}	—	December 8, 1999	Socorro	LINEAR	·	2.4 km	MPC · JPL
164940	1999 XZ_{155}	—	December 8, 1999	Socorro	LINEAR	·	2.0 km	MPC · JPL
164941	1999 XQ_{168}	—	December 10, 1999	Socorro	LINEAR	·	3.1 km	MPC · JPL
164942	1999 XE_{170}	—	December 10, 1999	Socorro	LINEAR	(5)	2.2 km	MPC · JPL
164943	1999 XS_{176}	—	December 10, 1999	Socorro	LINEAR	·	2.3 km	MPC · JPL
164944	1999 XU_{177}	—	December 10, 1999	Socorro	LINEAR	·	2.2 km	MPC · JPL
164945	1999 XD_{183}	—	December 12, 1999	Socorro	LINEAR	·	1.6 km	MPC · JPL
164946	1999 XF_{192}	—	December 12, 1999	Socorro	LINEAR	·	3.4 km	MPC · JPL
164947	1999 XN_{201}	—	December 12, 1999	Socorro	LINEAR	·	1.9 km	MPC · JPL
164948	1999 XQ_{229}	—	December 7, 1999	Catalina	CSS	·	1.7 km	MPC · JPL
164949	1999 XF_{231}	—	December 7, 1999	Catalina	CSS	·	3.9 km	MPC · JPL
164950	1999 XC_{234}	—	December 4, 1999	Anderson Mesa	LONEOS	·	3.1 km	MPC · JPL
164951	1999 XM_{242}	—	December 13, 1999	Socorro	LINEAR	·	3.9 km	MPC · JPL
164952	1999 XM_{243}	—	December 3, 1999	Anderson Mesa	LONEOS	JUN	3.5 km	MPC · JPL
164953	1999 XP_{252}	—	December 12, 1999	Kitt Peak	Spacewatch	·	1.5 km	MPC · JPL
164954	1999 YW_{3}	—	December 19, 1999	Socorro	LINEAR	·	7.1 km	MPC · JPL
164955	1999 YA_{11}	—	December 27, 1999	Kitt Peak	Spacewatch	·	2.1 km	MPC · JPL
164956	1999 YZ_{13}	—	December 27, 1999	Kitt Peak	Spacewatch	·	2.4 km	MPC · JPL
164957	1999 YW_{22}	—	December 31, 1999	Anderson Mesa	LONEOS	·	2.2 km	MPC · JPL
164958	2000 AM_{3}	—	January 2, 2000	Socorro	LINEAR	·	2.0 km	MPC · JPL
164959	2000 AS_{8}	—	January 2, 2000	Socorro	LINEAR	·	2.2 km	MPC · JPL
164960	2000 AW_{13}	—	January 3, 2000	Socorro	LINEAR	·	2.8 km	MPC · JPL
164961	2000 AH_{16}	—	January 3, 2000	Socorro	LINEAR	·	2.1 km	MPC · JPL
164962	2000 AO_{27}	—	January 3, 2000	Socorro	LINEAR	·	2.1 km	MPC · JPL
164963	2000 AW_{29}	—	January 3, 2000	Socorro	LINEAR	·	3.6 km	MPC · JPL
164964	2000 AT_{30}	—	January 3, 2000	Socorro	LINEAR	·	2.0 km	MPC · JPL
164965	2000 AZ_{39}	—	January 3, 2000	Socorro	LINEAR	·	2.7 km	MPC · JPL
164966	2000 AM_{44}	—	January 5, 2000	Kitt Peak	Spacewatch	·	2.8 km	MPC · JPL
164967	2000 AO_{51}	—	January 4, 2000	Socorro	LINEAR	·	3.3 km	MPC · JPL
164968	2000 AS_{52}	—	January 4, 2000	Socorro	LINEAR	·	3.0 km	MPC · JPL
164969	2000 AK_{53}	—	January 4, 2000	Socorro	LINEAR	·	2.6 km	MPC · JPL
164970	2000 AV_{53}	—	January 4, 2000	Socorro	LINEAR	·	3.0 km	MPC · JPL
164971	2000 AV_{61}	—	January 4, 2000	Socorro	LINEAR	·	3.3 km	MPC · JPL
164972	2000 AM_{62}	—	January 4, 2000	Socorro	LINEAR	·	3.8 km	MPC · JPL
164973	2000 AU_{68}	—	January 5, 2000	Socorro	LINEAR	·	2.8 km	MPC · JPL
164974	2000 AO_{78}	—	January 5, 2000	Socorro	LINEAR	·	2.8 km	MPC · JPL
164975	2000 AO_{117}	—	January 5, 2000	Socorro	LINEAR	·	2.9 km	MPC · JPL
164976	2000 AJ_{118}	—	January 5, 2000	Socorro	LINEAR	(5)	2.1 km	MPC · JPL
164977	2000 AA_{123}	—	January 5, 2000	Socorro	LINEAR	·	3.0 km	MPC · JPL
164978	2000 AH_{143}	—	January 5, 2000	Socorro	LINEAR	·	6.3 km	MPC · JPL
164979	2000 AK_{152}	—	January 8, 2000	Socorro	LINEAR	H	1.0 km	MPC · JPL
164980	2000 AW_{152}	—	January 8, 2000	Socorro	LINEAR	GAL	3.9 km	MPC · JPL
164981	2000 AT_{167}	—	January 8, 2000	Socorro	LINEAR	EUN	2.0 km	MPC · JPL
164982	2000 AL_{171}	—	January 7, 2000	Socorro	LINEAR	·	2.0 km	MPC · JPL
164983	2000 AE_{178}	—	January 7, 2000	Socorro	LINEAR	·	2.9 km	MPC · JPL
164984	2000 AF_{193}	—	January 8, 2000	Socorro	LINEAR	·	3.2 km	MPC · JPL
164985	2000 AN_{207}	—	January 3, 2000	Kitt Peak	Spacewatch	·	3.3 km	MPC · JPL
164986	2000 AE_{219}	—	January 8, 2000	Kitt Peak	Spacewatch	·	1.8 km	MPC · JPL
164987	2000 AE_{234}	—	January 5, 2000	Socorro	LINEAR	(5)	1.6 km	MPC · JPL
164988	2000 AK_{239}	—	January 6, 2000	Socorro	LINEAR	·	3.3 km	MPC · JPL
164989	2000 AE_{247}	—	January 2, 2000	Socorro	LINEAR	HNS	2.4 km	MPC · JPL
164990	2000 BB_{2}	—	January 27, 2000	Kitt Peak	Spacewatch	AGN	1.7 km	MPC · JPL
164991	2000 BQ_{8}	—	January 29, 2000	Socorro	LINEAR	·	3.6 km	MPC · JPL
164992	2000 BX_{8}	—	January 29, 2000	Socorro	LINEAR	·	3.8 km	MPC · JPL
164993	2000 BW_{9}	—	January 26, 2000	Kitt Peak	Spacewatch	AST	2.9 km	MPC · JPL
164994	2000 BK_{13}	—	January 29, 2000	Kitt Peak	Spacewatch	·	2.1 km	MPC · JPL
164995	2000 BR_{16}	—	January 30, 2000	Socorro	LINEAR	·	4.5 km	MPC · JPL
164996	2000 BS_{17}	—	January 30, 2000	Socorro	LINEAR	·	2.3 km	MPC · JPL
164997	2000 BW_{24}	—	January 29, 2000	Socorro	LINEAR	·	2.5 km	MPC · JPL
164998	2000 BO_{25}	—	January 30, 2000	Socorro	LINEAR	·	2.6 km	MPC · JPL
164999	2000 BS_{25}	—	January 30, 2000	Socorro	LINEAR	·	3.2 km	MPC · JPL
165000	2000 BS_{31}	—	January 27, 2000	Kitt Peak	Spacewatch	GEF	1.9 km	MPC · JPL

back to top

== See also ==
- Meanings of minor-planet names: 164001–165000
