= Meanings of minor-planet names: 164001–165000 =

As minor planet discoveries are confirmed, they are given a permanent number by the IAU's Minor Planet Center (MPC), and the discoverers can then submit names for them, following the IAU's naming conventions. The list below concerns those minor planets in the specified number-range that have received names, and explains the meanings of those names.

Official naming citations of newly named small Solar System bodies are approved and published in a bulletin by IAU's Working Group for Small Bodies Nomenclature (WGSBN). Before May 2021, citations were published in MPC's Minor Planet Circulars for many decades. Recent citations can also be found on the JPL Small-Body Database (SBDB). Until his death in 2016, German astronomer Lutz D. Schmadel compiled these citations into the Dictionary of Minor Planet Names (DMP) and regularly updated the collection.

Based on Paul Herget's The Names of the Minor Planets, Schmadel also researched the unclear origin of numerous asteroids, most of which had been named prior to World War II. This article incorporates text from this source, which is in the public domain: SBDB New namings may only be added to this list below after official publication as the preannouncement of names is condemned. The WGSBN publishes a comprehensive guideline for the naming rules of non-cometary small Solar System bodies.

== 164001–164100 ==
Named minor planet	Provisional	This minor planet was named for...	Ref · Catalog
164006 Thierry	2003 UT_{185}	Thierry Christophe (born 1948), French entomologist and brother of astronomer Bernard Christophe who discovered this minor planet	JPL · 164006

== 164101–164200 ==
back to top

Named minor planet	Provisional	This minor planet was named for...	Ref · Catalog
164130 Jonckheere	2003 YY_{21}	Robert Louis Charles Jonckheere (1888–1974), French amateur astronomer who observed visual double stars	JPL · 164130

== 164201–164300 ==
back to top

Named minor planet	Provisional	This minor planet was named for...	Ref · Catalog
164207 Cardea	2004 GU_{9}	Cardea, the Roman goddess of the hinge.	JPL · 164207
164215 Doloreshill	2004 MF_{6}	Dolores H. Hill (born 1956), American meteoriticist	JPL · 164215
164268 Hajmási	2004 VV_{69}	József Hajmási (1910–2010), Hungarian physicist, teacher and amateur astronomer	JPL · 164268

== 164301–164400 ==
back to top

Named minor planet	Provisional	This minor planet was named for...	Ref · Catalog
There are no named minor planets in this number range

== 164401–164500 ==
back to top

Named minor planet	Provisional	This minor planet was named for...	Ref · Catalog
164405 Fennell	2005 UK_{504}	Frederick Fennell (1914–2004), conductor of wind orchestras in the United States who founded the Eastman Wind Ensemble in 1952.	JPL · 164405
164406 Akiyamatoshio	2005 UV_{504}	Toshio Akiyama, popularized the wind symphony in Japan and became Japan's foremost conductor of wind orchestras.	IAU · 164406

== 164501–164600 ==
back to top

Named minor planet	Provisional	This minor planet was named for...	Ref · Catalog
164518 Patoche	2006 HN_{18}	Patrice Christophe (born 1945), French architect and brother of astronomer Bernard Christophe who discovered this minor planet. "Patoche" is his nickname.	JPL · 164518
164536 Davehinson	2006 HF_{150}	David P. Hinson (born 1954), a Senior Research Scientist at Stanford University, served as a Co-Investigator for Radio Science for the New Horizons Mission to Pluto.	JPL · 164536
164585 Oenomaos	2007 ND_{2}	King Oenomaus of Pisa was the son of Ares by Harpina and father of Hippodamia	JPL · 164585
164586 Arlette	2007 NL_{4}	Arlette Naef (born 1949), wife of Swiss amateur astronomer Peter Kocher who discovered this minor planet	JPL · 164586
164587 Taesch	2007 OS	Paul Taesch (1927–), early astronomical mentor of French amateur astronomer Claudine Rinner who discovered this minor planet	JPL · 164587
164589 La Sagra	2007 PC_{11}	La Sagra, at 2382 meters the highest peak of the Cordillera Subbética mountain range of southern Spain and home of the discovering La Sagra Observatory	JPL · 164589

== 164601–164700 ==
back to top

Named minor planet	Provisional	This minor planet was named for...	Ref · Catalog
164676 Oliviabaraldi	1997 EL_{7}	Olivia Baraldi, first daughter of Mattia Baraldi and Laura Colombini. She is the fourth granddaughter of one of the co-discoverers of this minor planet at Osservatorio S. Vittore.	IAU · 164676

== 164701–164800 ==
back to top

Named minor planet	Provisional	This minor planet was named for...	Ref · Catalog
164701 Horanyi	1998 AX_{9}	Mihaly Horanyi (born 1955) is Professor of Physics at the University of Colorado, who served as a science team Co-Investigator and as the Principal Investigator of the Student Dust Counter instrument for the New Horizons Mission to Pluto.	JPL · 164701
164791 Nicinski	1999 FJ_{70}	Tom Nicinski (born 1960), American software engineer with the Sloan Digital Sky Survey	JPL · 164791
164792 Owen	1999 FD_{78}	Russell Owen (born 1959), American engineer with the Sloan Digital Sky Survey	JPL · 164792

== 164801–164900 ==
back to top

Named minor planet	Provisional	This minor planet was named for...	Ref · Catalog
There are no named minor planets in this number range

== 164901–165000 ==
back to top

Named minor planet	Provisional	This minor planet was named for...	Ref · Catalog
There are no named minor planets in this number range

back to top

Preceded by 163,001–164,000	Meanings of minor-planet names List of minor planets: 164,001–165,000	Succeeded by 165,001–166,000
