= 164589 La Sagra =

Main-belt asteroid

Discovery
- Discovered by: OAM
- Discovery site: La Sagra Obs.
- Discovery date: 11 August 2007

Designations
- Pronunciation: /lɑːˈsɑːɡrə/
- Named after: Sierra de La Sagra; La Sagra Observatory (mountain and observatory)
- Alternative designations: 2007 PC_{11} · 2000 WD_{196} 2003 OS_{32} · 2006 FH_{21}
- Minor planet category: main-belt · (inner); Euterpe

Orbital characteristics
- Epoch 27 April 2019 (JD 2458600.5)
- Uncertainty parameter 0
- Observation arc: 25.59 yr (9,347 d)
- Aphelion: 2.9805 AU
- Perihelion: 1.9053 AU
- Semi-major axis: 2.4429 AU
- Eccentricity: 0.2201
- Orbital period (sidereal): 3.82 yr (1,395 d)
- Mean anomaly: 41.049°
- Mean motion: 0° 15^{m} 29.16^{s} / day
- Inclination: 1.3394°
- Longitude of ascending node: 128.30°
- Argument of perihelion: 175.08°

Physical characteristics
- Mean diameter: 1.2 km (est. at 0.26)
- Spectral type: S (likely)
- Absolute magnitude (H): 16.6

164589 La Sagra (provisional designation 2007 PC_{11}) is an asteroid of the Euterpe family from the inner regions of the asteroid belt. It is approximately 1.2 kilometers (0.75 miles) in diameter. It was discovered on 11 August 2007, by astronomers of the Astronomical Observatory of Mallorca at its robotic La Sagra Observatory in Grenada, Spain. It was named after Mount La Sagra and the discovering La Sagra Observatory.

== Orbit and classification ==
La Sagra is a member of the Euterpe family (410), a small family of stony asteroids named after its principal body, 27 Euterpe. It orbits the Sun in the inner asteroid belt at a distance of 1.9–3.0 AU, completing an orbit once every 3 years and 10 months (1,395 days; semi-major axis of 2.44 AU). Its orbit has an eccentricity of 0.22 and an inclination of 1° with respect to the ecliptic. Its observation arc begins with a precovery taken by Spacewatch in October 1992, nearly 15 years prior to its official discovery observation at La Sagra Observatory.

== Naming ==
This minor planet takes its name from the mountain La Sagra ("Sierra de La Sagra"; 2,382 meters above sea level), the highest mountain of the Prebetic mountain range, on whose north hillside the La Sagra Observatory is located. It was the observatory's first numbered discovery. The official naming citation was published by the Minor Planet Center on 21 March 2008 (M.P.C. 62357).

== Physical characteristics ==
Since Euterpe asteroids are of silicaceous rather than carbonaceous composition, with a relatively high albedo around 0.26 (also see list of families), La Sagra measures approximately 1.2 kilometer in diameter, based on an absolute magnitude of 16.6. As of 2018, no rotational lightcurve of La Sagra has been obtained from photometric observations. The body's rotation period, pole and shape remain unknown.
