= List of minor planets: 165001–166000 =

The following is a partial list of minor planets, running from minor-planet number 165001 through 166000, inclusive. The primary data for this and other partial lists is based on JPL's "Small-Body Orbital Elements" and data available from the Minor Planet Center. Critical list information is also provided by the MPC, unless otherwise specified from Lowell Observatory. A detailed description of the table's columns and additional sources are given on the main page including a complete list of every page in this series, and a statistical break-up on the dynamical classification of minor planets.

Also see the summary list of all named bodies in numerical and alphabetical order, and the corresponding naming citations for the number range of this particular list. New namings may only be added to this list after official publication, as the preannouncement of names is condemned by the Working Group for Small Bodies Nomenclature of the International Astronomical Union.

Near-Earth obj.	MBA (inner)	MBA (outer)	Centaur
Mars-crosser	MBA (middle)	Jupiter trojan	Trans-Neptunian obj.
Unclassified

== 165001–165100 ==
Designation			Discovery			Properties		Ref
Permanent	Provisional	Named after	Date	Site	Discoverer(s)	Category	Diam.	Ref
165001	2000 BA_{38}	—	January 28, 2000	Kitt Peak	Spacewatch	·	2.6 km	MPC · JPL
165002	2000 BM_{49}	—	January 26, 2000	Kitt Peak	Spacewatch	·	2.5 km	MPC · JPL
165003	2000 BT_{49}	—	January 21, 2000	Socorro	LINEAR	·	5.0 km	MPC · JPL
165004	2000 CH_{15}	—	February 2, 2000	Socorro	LINEAR	AEO	2.0 km	MPC · JPL
165005	2000 CD_{22}	—	February 2, 2000	Socorro	LINEAR	·	3.8 km	MPC · JPL
165006	2000 CC_{39}	—	February 3, 2000	Socorro	LINEAR	·	2.2 km	MPC · JPL
165007	2000 CW_{44}	—	February 2, 2000	Socorro	LINEAR	·	2.6 km	MPC · JPL
165008	2000 CJ_{45}	—	February 2, 2000	Socorro	LINEAR	·	2.7 km	MPC · JPL
165009	2000 CC_{46}	—	February 2, 2000	Socorro	LINEAR	EUN	2.0 km	MPC · JPL
165010	2000 CG_{79}	—	February 8, 2000	Kitt Peak	Spacewatch	PAD	4.8 km	MPC · JPL
165011	2000 CA_{82}	—	February 4, 2000	Socorro	LINEAR	·	3.0 km	MPC · JPL
165012	2000 CJ_{84}	—	February 4, 2000	Socorro	LINEAR	EUN	2.5 km	MPC · JPL
165013	2000 CO_{90}	—	February 6, 2000	Socorro	LINEAR	·	4.0 km	MPC · JPL
165014	2000 CZ_{97}	—	February 7, 2000	Kitt Peak	Spacewatch	·	4.6 km	MPC · JPL
165015	2000 CS_{98}	—	February 8, 2000	Kitt Peak	Spacewatch	PAD	4.3 km	MPC · JPL
165016	2000 CV_{98}	—	February 8, 2000	Kitt Peak	Spacewatch	·	2.5 km	MPC · JPL
165017	2000 CM_{108}	—	February 5, 2000	Catalina	CSS	·	3.1 km	MPC · JPL
165018	2000 CP_{113}	—	February 11, 2000	Kitt Peak	Spacewatch	·	2.3 km	MPC · JPL
165019	2000 CG_{115}	—	February 2, 2000	Catalina	CSS	·	2.0 km	MPC · JPL
165020	2000 CB_{126}	—	February 3, 2000	Socorro	LINEAR	MRX	1.9 km	MPC · JPL
165021	2000 CJ_{129}	—	February 3, 2000	Kitt Peak	Spacewatch	·	2.8 km	MPC · JPL
165022	2000 CN_{130}	—	February 3, 2000	Kitt Peak	Spacewatch	·	2.2 km	MPC · JPL
165023	2000 CD_{132}	—	February 3, 2000	Kitt Peak	Spacewatch	·	2.8 km	MPC · JPL
165024	2000 CG_{132}	—	February 3, 2000	Kitt Peak	Spacewatch	·	2.5 km	MPC · JPL
165025	2000 DT_{7}	—	February 28, 2000	Kitt Peak	Spacewatch	·	2.4 km	MPC · JPL
165026	2000 DJ_{9}	—	February 26, 2000	Kitt Peak	Spacewatch	HOF	3.1 km	MPC · JPL
165027	2000 DU_{12}	—	February 27, 2000	Kitt Peak	Spacewatch	·	3.9 km	MPC · JPL
165028	2000 DA_{19}	—	February 29, 2000	Socorro	LINEAR	DOR	3.9 km	MPC · JPL
165029	2000 DC_{21}	—	February 29, 2000	Socorro	LINEAR	DOR	5.2 km	MPC · JPL
165030	2000 DT_{24}	—	February 29, 2000	Socorro	LINEAR	NEM	3.6 km	MPC · JPL
165031	2000 DB_{27}	—	February 29, 2000	Socorro	LINEAR	·	2.2 km	MPC · JPL
165032	2000 DL_{54}	—	February 29, 2000	Socorro	LINEAR	MRX	1.8 km	MPC · JPL
165033	2000 DL_{58}	—	February 29, 2000	Socorro	LINEAR	·	3.3 km	MPC · JPL
165034	2000 DX_{60}	—	February 29, 2000	Socorro	LINEAR	·	4.7 km	MPC · JPL
165035	2000 DH_{63}	—	February 29, 2000	Socorro	LINEAR	EOS	2.8 km	MPC · JPL
165036	2000 DB_{76}	—	February 29, 2000	Socorro	LINEAR	GEF	2.5 km	MPC · JPL
165037	2000 DV_{88}	—	February 25, 2000	Kitt Peak	Spacewatch	EUP	5.1 km	MPC · JPL
165038	2000 DM_{89}	—	February 26, 2000	Kitt Peak	Spacewatch	·	2.5 km	MPC · JPL
165039	2000 DP_{95}	—	February 28, 2000	Socorro	LINEAR	·	5.1 km	MPC · JPL
165040	2000 DR_{97}	—	February 29, 2000	Socorro	LINEAR	·	1.9 km	MPC · JPL
165041	2000 DG_{100}	—	February 29, 2000	Socorro	LINEAR	AGN	2.2 km	MPC · JPL
165042	2000 DE_{110}	—	February 29, 2000	Socorro	LINEAR	·	4.2 km	MPC · JPL
165043	2000 DM_{113}	—	February 27, 2000	Kitt Peak	Spacewatch	·	3.3 km	MPC · JPL
165044	2000 EO_{8}	—	March 3, 2000	Socorro	LINEAR	3:2	8.9 km	MPC · JPL
165045	2000 ES_{16}	—	March 3, 2000	Socorro	LINEAR	·	4.7 km	MPC · JPL
165046	2000 EG_{18}	—	March 4, 2000	Socorro	LINEAR	GEF	2.1 km	MPC · JPL
165047	2000 EY_{32}	—	March 5, 2000	Socorro	LINEAR	·	3.5 km	MPC · JPL
165048	2000 EE_{35}	—	March 8, 2000	Socorro	LINEAR	·	3.1 km	MPC · JPL
165049	2000 EO_{42}	—	March 8, 2000	Socorro	LINEAR	BRA	2.7 km	MPC · JPL
165050	2000 EF_{48}	—	March 9, 2000	Socorro	LINEAR	·	5.9 km	MPC · JPL
165051	2000 EL_{51}	—	March 3, 2000	Kitt Peak	Spacewatch	KOR	1.6 km	MPC · JPL
165052	2000 EE_{59}	—	March 9, 2000	Socorro	LINEAR	·	4.0 km	MPC · JPL
165053	2000 EM_{61}	—	March 10, 2000	Socorro	LINEAR	·	3.6 km	MPC · JPL
165054	2000 EP_{68}	—	March 10, 2000	Socorro	LINEAR	·	3.3 km	MPC · JPL
165055	2000 EP_{76}	—	March 5, 2000	Socorro	LINEAR	·	2.6 km	MPC · JPL
165056	2000 ED_{79}	—	March 5, 2000	Socorro	LINEAR	·	4.1 km	MPC · JPL
165057	2000 EF_{96}	—	March 11, 2000	Socorro	LINEAR	·	4.1 km	MPC · JPL
165058	2000 EW_{100}	—	March 12, 2000	Kitt Peak	Spacewatch	·	3.2 km	MPC · JPL
165059	2000 ET_{102}	—	March 14, 2000	Kitt Peak	Spacewatch	KOR	1.9 km	MPC · JPL
165060	2000 EW_{114}	—	March 10, 2000	Kitt Peak	Spacewatch	HOF	5.3 km	MPC · JPL
165061	2000 EF_{115}	—	March 10, 2000	Kitt Peak	Spacewatch	·	3.3 km	MPC · JPL
165062	2000 EO_{119}	—	March 11, 2000	Anderson Mesa	LONEOS	·	3.1 km	MPC · JPL
165063	2000 EM_{146}	—	March 4, 2000	Socorro	LINEAR	·	3.7 km	MPC · JPL
165064	2000 ED_{166}	—	March 3, 2000	Socorro	LINEAR	EOS	5.4 km	MPC · JPL
165065	2000 ES_{169}	—	March 4, 2000	Socorro	LINEAR	·	4.8 km	MPC · JPL
165066	2000 ES_{199}	—	March 1, 2000	Catalina	CSS	·	3.4 km	MPC · JPL
165067 Pauls	2000 ED_{207}	Pauls	March 4, 2000	Apache Point	SDSS	JUN · fast	1.3 km	MPC · JPL
165068	2000 FV	—	March 26, 2000	Prescott	P. G. Comba	EOS	5.4 km	MPC · JPL
165069	2000 FH_{7}	—	March 29, 2000	Kitt Peak	Spacewatch	·	2.8 km	MPC · JPL
165070	2000 FX_{8}	—	March 29, 2000	Kitt Peak	Spacewatch	·	6.6 km	MPC · JPL
165071	2000 FT_{24}	—	March 29, 2000	Socorro	LINEAR	·	4.4 km	MPC · JPL
165072	2000 FB_{27}	—	March 27, 2000	Anderson Mesa	LONEOS	EOS	4.4 km	MPC · JPL
165073	2000 FE_{28}	—	March 27, 2000	Anderson Mesa	LONEOS	·	3.4 km	MPC · JPL
165074	2000 FB_{40}	—	March 29, 2000	Socorro	LINEAR	·	3.0 km	MPC · JPL
165075	2000 FW_{58}	—	March 26, 2000	Anderson Mesa	LONEOS	·	5.1 km	MPC · JPL
165076	2000 FX_{63}	—	March 29, 2000	Socorro	LINEAR	GEF · fast	1.9 km	MPC · JPL
165077	2000 FB_{72}	—	March 25, 2000	Kitt Peak	Spacewatch	AGN	1.8 km	MPC · JPL
165078	2000 GN_{11}	—	April 5, 2000	Socorro	LINEAR	GEF	1.9 km	MPC · JPL
165079	2000 GG_{17}	—	April 5, 2000	Socorro	LINEAR	EOS	2.9 km	MPC · JPL
165080	2000 GU_{21}	—	April 5, 2000	Socorro	LINEAR	·	3.0 km	MPC · JPL
165081	2000 GG_{23}	—	April 5, 2000	Socorro	LINEAR	·	4.1 km	MPC · JPL
165082	2000 GJ_{34}	—	April 5, 2000	Socorro	LINEAR	·	5.3 km	MPC · JPL
165083	2000 GK_{37}	—	April 5, 2000	Socorro	LINEAR	·	5.0 km	MPC · JPL
165084	2000 GG_{38}	—	April 5, 2000	Socorro	LINEAR	·	3.1 km	MPC · JPL
165085	2000 GZ_{38}	—	April 5, 2000	Socorro	LINEAR	·	6.0 km	MPC · JPL
165086	2000 GN_{44}	—	April 5, 2000	Socorro	LINEAR	·	4.1 km	MPC · JPL
165087	2000 GF_{45}	—	April 5, 2000	Socorro	LINEAR	·	3.5 km	MPC · JPL
165088	2000 GU_{46}	—	April 5, 2000	Socorro	LINEAR	·	5.2 km	MPC · JPL
165089	2000 GT_{62}	—	April 5, 2000	Socorro	LINEAR	THM	3.7 km	MPC · JPL
165090	2000 GP_{72}	—	April 5, 2000	Socorro	LINEAR	·	6.1 km	MPC · JPL
165091	2000 GK_{79}	—	April 5, 2000	Socorro	LINEAR	THM	3.6 km	MPC · JPL
165092	2000 GM_{81}	—	April 6, 2000	Socorro	LINEAR	·	6.8 km	MPC · JPL
165093	2000 GG_{89}	—	April 4, 2000	Socorro	LINEAR	·	6.9 km	MPC · JPL
165094	2000 GV_{89}	—	April 4, 2000	Socorro	LINEAR	·	3.8 km	MPC · JPL
165095	2000 GR_{111}	—	April 3, 2000	Anderson Mesa	LONEOS	·	2.8 km	MPC · JPL
165096	2000 GX_{128}	—	April 5, 2000	Kitt Peak	Spacewatch	·	2.5 km	MPC · JPL
165097	2000 GB_{129}	—	April 5, 2000	Kitt Peak	Spacewatch	AGN	1.9 km	MPC · JPL
165098	2000 GG_{133}	—	April 12, 2000	Haleakala	NEAT	T_{j} (2.91)	4.9 km	MPC · JPL
165099	2000 GJ_{154}	—	April 6, 2000	Anderson Mesa	LONEOS	·	4.7 km	MPC · JPL
165100	2000 HV	—	April 24, 2000	Kitt Peak	Spacewatch	·	4.0 km	MPC · JPL

== 165101–165200 ==
back to top

Designation			Discovery			Properties		Ref
Permanent	Provisional	Named after	Date	Site	Discoverer(s)	Category	Diam.	Ref
165101	2000 HY_{3}	—	April 26, 2000	Kitt Peak	Spacewatch	·	4.8 km	MPC · JPL
165102	2000 HN_{17}	—	April 24, 2000	Kitt Peak	Spacewatch	·	3.5 km	MPC · JPL
165103	2000 HJ_{26}	—	April 24, 2000	Anderson Mesa	LONEOS	TRE	5.3 km	MPC · JPL
165104	2000 HR_{33}	—	April 24, 2000	Anderson Mesa	LONEOS	·	5.7 km	MPC · JPL
165105	2000 HG_{45}	—	April 26, 2000	Anderson Mesa	LONEOS	·	4.6 km	MPC · JPL
165106	2000 HS_{59}	—	April 25, 2000	Anderson Mesa	LONEOS	·	4.6 km	MPC · JPL
165107	2000 HE_{63}	—	April 26, 2000	Anderson Mesa	LONEOS	EOS	3.4 km	MPC · JPL
165108	2000 HN_{67}	—	April 27, 2000	Kitt Peak	Spacewatch	EOS	3.6 km	MPC · JPL
165109	2000 HS_{71}	—	April 25, 2000	Anderson Mesa	LONEOS	·	5.4 km	MPC · JPL
165110	2000 HR_{84}	—	April 30, 2000	Anderson Mesa	LONEOS	·	4.9 km	MPC · JPL
165111	2000 HC_{103}	—	April 27, 2000	Anderson Mesa	LONEOS	·	5.9 km	MPC · JPL
165112	2000 HE_{103}	—	April 27, 2000	Anderson Mesa	LONEOS	TIR	4.1 km	MPC · JPL
165113	2000 JB_{19}	—	May 3, 2000	Socorro	LINEAR	TIR	3.1 km	MPC · JPL
165114	2000 JK_{27}	—	May 7, 2000	Socorro	LINEAR	HYG	6.8 km	MPC · JPL
165115	2000 JY_{28}	—	May 7, 2000	Socorro	LINEAR	·	8.5 km	MPC · JPL
165116	2000 JX_{41}	—	May 7, 2000	Socorro	LINEAR	URS	7.2 km	MPC · JPL
165117	2000 JB_{61}	—	May 7, 2000	Socorro	LINEAR	·	1.2 km	MPC · JPL
165118	2000 JB_{68}	—	May 7, 2000	Kitt Peak	Spacewatch	·	5.1 km	MPC · JPL
165119	2000 JC_{68}	—	May 7, 2000	Kitt Peak	Spacewatch	·	3.4 km	MPC · JPL
165120	2000 JZ_{71}	—	May 1, 2000	Anderson Mesa	LONEOS	HYG	5.1 km	MPC · JPL
165121	2000 JY_{76}	—	May 7, 2000	Socorro	LINEAR	·	1.2 km	MPC · JPL
165122	2000 JJ_{84}	—	May 5, 2000	Socorro	LINEAR	·	9.4 km	MPC · JPL
165123	2000 KP_{6}	—	May 27, 2000	Socorro	LINEAR	·	5.1 km	MPC · JPL
165124	2000 KW_{8}	—	May 28, 2000	Socorro	LINEAR	·	770 m	MPC · JPL
165125	2000 KC_{11}	—	May 28, 2000	Socorro	LINEAR	·	5.6 km	MPC · JPL
165126	2000 KJ_{32}	—	May 28, 2000	Socorro	LINEAR	·	4.4 km	MPC · JPL
165127	2000 KX_{40}	—	May 30, 2000	Kitt Peak	Spacewatch	·	4.9 km	MPC · JPL
165128	2000 KU_{43}	—	May 31, 2000	Kitt Peak	Spacewatch	·	1.4 km	MPC · JPL
165129	2000 KU_{44}	—	May 28, 2000	Kitt Peak	Spacewatch	EOS	3.6 km	MPC · JPL
165130	2000 KP_{54}	—	May 27, 2000	Anderson Mesa	LONEOS	·	4.6 km	MPC · JPL
165131	2000 KQ_{57}	—	May 24, 2000	Anderson Mesa	LONEOS	LIX	5.6 km	MPC · JPL
165132	2000 KV_{58}	—	May 24, 2000	Anderson Mesa	LONEOS	·	1.3 km	MPC · JPL
165133	2000 KP_{61}	—	May 25, 2000	Anderson Mesa	LONEOS	·	7.7 km	MPC · JPL
165134	2000 KT_{65}	—	May 27, 2000	Anderson Mesa	LONEOS	·	4.5 km	MPC · JPL
165135	2000 KU_{70}	—	May 28, 2000	Socorro	LINEAR	·	6.5 km	MPC · JPL
165136	2000 KN_{74}	—	May 27, 2000	Socorro	LINEAR	·	5.2 km	MPC · JPL
165137	2000 KM_{79}	—	May 27, 2000	Socorro	LINEAR	EUP	9.9 km	MPC · JPL
165138	2000 NL_{5}	—	July 7, 2000	Socorro	LINEAR	·	1.5 km	MPC · JPL
165139	2000 NJ_{10}	—	July 6, 2000	Anderson Mesa	LONEOS	·	1.3 km	MPC · JPL
165140	2000 OJ_{1}	—	July 24, 2000	Kitt Peak	Spacewatch	·	1.2 km	MPC · JPL
165141	2000 OH_{14}	—	July 23, 2000	Socorro	LINEAR	·	1.1 km	MPC · JPL
165142	2000 OM_{40}	—	July 30, 2000	Socorro	LINEAR	·	1.3 km	MPC · JPL
165143	2000 PQ_{2}	—	August 2, 2000	Socorro	LINEAR	·	2.4 km	MPC · JPL
165144	2000 QO_{7}	—	August 25, 2000	Socorro	LINEAR	·	1.5 km	MPC · JPL
165145	2000 QV_{10}	—	August 24, 2000	Socorro	LINEAR	·	1.8 km	MPC · JPL
165146	2000 QN_{13}	—	August 24, 2000	Socorro	LINEAR	·	1.3 km	MPC · JPL
165147	2000 QD_{18}	—	August 24, 2000	Socorro	LINEAR	·	1.1 km	MPC · JPL
165148	2000 QR_{18}	—	August 24, 2000	Socorro	LINEAR	·	1.1 km	MPC · JPL
165149	2000 QC_{22}	—	August 24, 2000	Socorro	LINEAR	·	2.3 km	MPC · JPL
165150	2000 QU_{28}	—	August 24, 2000	Socorro	LINEAR	THM	4.1 km	MPC · JPL
165151	2000 QT_{33}	—	August 26, 2000	Prescott	P. G. Comba	·	1.8 km	MPC · JPL
165152	2000 QS_{38}	—	August 24, 2000	Socorro	LINEAR	·	1.4 km	MPC · JPL
165153	2000 QR_{39}	—	August 24, 2000	Socorro	LINEAR	·	1.6 km	MPC · JPL
165154	2000 QE_{40}	—	August 24, 2000	Socorro	LINEAR	·	1.0 km	MPC · JPL
165155	2000 QG_{40}	—	August 24, 2000	Socorro	LINEAR	·	1.1 km	MPC · JPL
165156	2000 QJ_{50}	—	August 24, 2000	Socorro	LINEAR	·	930 m	MPC · JPL
165157	2000 QO_{50}	—	August 24, 2000	Socorro	LINEAR	·	1.1 km	MPC · JPL
165158	2000 QE_{51}	—	August 24, 2000	Socorro	LINEAR	·	1.1 km	MPC · JPL
165159	2000 QP_{55}	—	August 25, 2000	Socorro	LINEAR	·	1.1 km	MPC · JPL
165160	2000 QX_{62}	—	August 28, 2000	Socorro	LINEAR	·	1.4 km	MPC · JPL
165161	2000 QP_{69}	—	August 30, 2000	Kitt Peak	Spacewatch	·	1.4 km	MPC · JPL
165162	2000 QS_{69}	—	August 30, 2000	Kitt Peak	Spacewatch	V	910 m	MPC · JPL
165163	2000 QP_{87}	—	August 25, 2000	Socorro	LINEAR	·	1.1 km	MPC · JPL
165164	2000 QT_{88}	—	August 25, 2000	Socorro	LINEAR	·	1.4 km	MPC · JPL
165165	2000 QS_{98}	—	August 28, 2000	Socorro	LINEAR	·	1.1 km	MPC · JPL
165166	2000 QV_{102}	—	August 28, 2000	Socorro	LINEAR	·	1.4 km	MPC · JPL
165167 Kikkawatsuneie	2000 QY_{109}	Kikkawatsuneie	August 28, 2000	Saji	Saji	NYS	1.5 km	MPC · JPL
165168	2000 QF_{110}	—	August 24, 2000	Socorro	LINEAR	·	1.8 km	MPC · JPL
165169	2000 QN_{110}	—	August 24, 2000	Socorro	LINEAR	·	750 m	MPC · JPL
165170	2000 QL_{113}	—	August 24, 2000	Socorro	LINEAR	·	1.4 km	MPC · JPL
165171	2000 QD_{119}	—	August 25, 2000	Socorro	LINEAR	·	1.9 km	MPC · JPL
165172	2000 QU_{124}	—	August 29, 2000	Socorro	LINEAR	PHO	2.2 km	MPC · JPL
165173	2000 QJ_{140}	—	August 31, 2000	Socorro	LINEAR	·	1.4 km	MPC · JPL
165174	2000 QF_{152}	—	August 28, 2000	Socorro	LINEAR	(2076)	1.3 km	MPC · JPL
165175	2000 QN_{153}	—	August 29, 2000	Socorro	LINEAR	·	1.2 km	MPC · JPL
165176	2000 QU_{154}	—	August 31, 2000	Socorro	LINEAR	V	1.0 km	MPC · JPL
165177	2000 QT_{159}	—	August 31, 2000	Socorro	LINEAR	·	1.4 km	MPC · JPL
165178	2000 QO_{164}	—	August 31, 2000	Socorro	LINEAR	·	1.1 km	MPC · JPL
165179	2000 QK_{166}	—	August 31, 2000	Socorro	LINEAR	·	2.0 km	MPC · JPL
165180	2000 QB_{170}	—	August 31, 2000	Socorro	LINEAR	·	1.4 km	MPC · JPL
165181	2000 QV_{170}	—	August 31, 2000	Socorro	LINEAR	·	1.4 km	MPC · JPL
165182	2000 QV_{172}	—	August 31, 2000	Socorro	LINEAR	·	3.0 km	MPC · JPL
165183	2000 QN_{186}	—	August 26, 2000	Socorro	LINEAR	·	1.3 km	MPC · JPL
165184	2000 QH_{208}	—	August 31, 2000	Socorro	LINEAR	·	1.4 km	MPC · JPL
165185	2000 QB_{210}	—	August 31, 2000	Socorro	LINEAR	·	1.2 km	MPC · JPL
165186	2000 QQ_{215}	—	August 31, 2000	Socorro	LINEAR	·	2.5 km	MPC · JPL
165187	2000 QY_{215}	—	August 31, 2000	Socorro	LINEAR	·	1.3 km	MPC · JPL
165188	2000 QD_{218}	—	August 31, 2000	Socorro	LINEAR	T_{j} (2.96) · HIL · 3:2	7.9 km	MPC · JPL
165189	2000 QG_{220}	—	August 21, 2000	Anderson Mesa	LONEOS	·	1.4 km	MPC · JPL
165190	2000 QC_{221}	—	August 21, 2000	Anderson Mesa	LONEOS	·	1.3 km	MPC · JPL
165191	2000 QX_{231}	—	August 29, 2000	Socorro	LINEAR	·	1.2 km	MPC · JPL
165192 Neugent	2000 QD_{235}	Neugent	August 26, 2000	Cerro Tololo	Wasserman, L. H.	·	1.3 km	MPC · JPL
165193	2000 QT_{243}	—	August 21, 2000	Anderson Mesa	LONEOS	·	1.1 km	MPC · JPL
165194	2000 RD_{5}	—	September 1, 2000	Socorro	LINEAR	·	1.1 km	MPC · JPL
165195	2000 RH_{16}	—	September 1, 2000	Socorro	LINEAR	·	1.5 km	MPC · JPL
165196	2000 RD_{19}	—	September 1, 2000	Socorro	LINEAR	·	1.4 km	MPC · JPL
165197	2000 RU_{21}	—	September 1, 2000	Socorro	LINEAR	·	1.8 km	MPC · JPL
165198	2000 RK_{24}	—	September 1, 2000	Socorro	LINEAR	·	1.1 km	MPC · JPL
165199	2000 RL_{41}	—	September 3, 2000	Socorro	LINEAR	·	1.8 km	MPC · JPL
165200	2000 RK_{49}	—	September 5, 2000	Socorro	LINEAR	·	1.2 km	MPC · JPL

== 165201–165300 ==
back to top

Designation			Discovery			Properties		Ref
Permanent	Provisional	Named after	Date	Site	Discoverer(s)	Category	Diam.	Ref
165201	2000 RW_{57}	—	September 7, 2000	Kitt Peak	Spacewatch	·	1.6 km	MPC · JPL
165202	2000 RV_{66}	—	September 1, 2000	Socorro	LINEAR	·	1.6 km	MPC · JPL
165203	2000 RX_{72}	—	September 2, 2000	Socorro	LINEAR	·	1.5 km	MPC · JPL
165204	2000 RO_{73}	—	September 2, 2000	Socorro	LINEAR	·	1.6 km	MPC · JPL
165205	2000 RL_{76}	—	September 4, 2000	Socorro	LINEAR	·	1.9 km	MPC · JPL
165206	2000 RU_{85}	—	September 2, 2000	Socorro	LINEAR	·	1.1 km	MPC · JPL
165207	2000 RR_{95}	—	September 4, 2000	Anderson Mesa	LONEOS	·	1.2 km	MPC · JPL
165208	2000 RB_{96}	—	September 4, 2000	Anderson Mesa	LONEOS	·	1.2 km	MPC · JPL
165209	2000 RW_{100}	—	September 5, 2000	Anderson Mesa	LONEOS	PHO	1.9 km	MPC · JPL
165210	2000 SB_{4}	—	September 21, 2000	Socorro	LINEAR	V	1.2 km	MPC · JPL
165211	2000 SP_{7}	—	September 22, 2000	Kitt Peak	Spacewatch	·	2.1 km	MPC · JPL
165212	2000 SX_{9}	—	September 23, 2000	Socorro	LINEAR	PHO	1.4 km	MPC · JPL
165213	2000 SJ_{12}	—	September 20, 2000	Socorro	LINEAR	·	1.3 km	MPC · JPL
165214	2000 SR_{29}	—	September 24, 2000	Socorro	LINEAR	·	1.6 km	MPC · JPL
165215	2000 SX_{31}	—	September 24, 2000	Socorro	LINEAR	·	1.5 km	MPC · JPL
165216	2000 SN_{33}	—	September 24, 2000	Socorro	LINEAR	·	1.4 km	MPC · JPL
165217	2000 SB_{37}	—	September 24, 2000	Socorro	LINEAR	·	1.4 km	MPC · JPL
165218	2000 SV_{37}	—	September 24, 2000	Socorro	LINEAR	·	1.5 km	MPC · JPL
165219	2000 SQ_{39}	—	September 24, 2000	Socorro	LINEAR	·	1.4 km	MPC · JPL
165220	2000 SZ_{40}	—	September 24, 2000	Socorro	LINEAR	·	1.1 km	MPC · JPL
165221	2000 SP_{44}	—	September 27, 2000	Socorro	LINEAR	·	4.6 km	MPC · JPL
165222	2000 SA_{45}	—	September 26, 2000	Haleakala	NEAT	·	1.7 km	MPC · JPL
165223	2000 SP_{48}	—	September 23, 2000	Socorro	LINEAR	·	1.3 km	MPC · JPL
165224	2000 SE_{50}	—	September 23, 2000	Socorro	LINEAR	·	1.3 km	MPC · JPL
165225	2000 SL_{57}	—	September 24, 2000	Socorro	LINEAR	·	1.4 km	MPC · JPL
165226	2000 SE_{59}	—	September 24, 2000	Socorro	LINEAR	·	1.6 km	MPC · JPL
165227	2000 SP_{62}	—	September 24, 2000	Socorro	LINEAR	·	1.6 km	MPC · JPL
165228	2000 SY_{69}	—	September 24, 2000	Socorro	LINEAR	·	1.1 km	MPC · JPL
165229	2000 SM_{79}	—	September 24, 2000	Socorro	LINEAR	·	1.3 km	MPC · JPL
165230	2000 SH_{89}	—	September 24, 2000	Socorro	LINEAR	·	1.6 km	MPC · JPL
165231	2000 SW_{94}	—	September 23, 2000	Socorro	LINEAR	·	1.2 km	MPC · JPL
165232	2000 SH_{102}	—	September 24, 2000	Socorro	LINEAR	·	1.3 km	MPC · JPL
165233	2000 SP_{102}	—	September 24, 2000	Socorro	LINEAR	SYL · CYB	9.7 km	MPC · JPL
165234	2000 SP_{108}	—	September 24, 2000	Socorro	LINEAR	·	1.5 km	MPC · JPL
165235	2000 SC_{110}	—	September 24, 2000	Socorro	LINEAR	·	1.2 km	MPC · JPL
165236	2000 SQ_{113}	—	September 24, 2000	Socorro	LINEAR	·	1.6 km	MPC · JPL
165237	2000 SQ_{115}	—	September 24, 2000	Socorro	LINEAR	V	1.0 km	MPC · JPL
165238	2000 SS_{116}	—	September 24, 2000	Socorro	LINEAR	V	1.2 km	MPC · JPL
165239	2000 SA_{119}	—	September 24, 2000	Socorro	LINEAR	NYS	1.6 km	MPC · JPL
165240	2000 SB_{120}	—	September 24, 2000	Socorro	LINEAR	·	1.6 km	MPC · JPL
165241	2000 SO_{133}	—	September 23, 2000	Socorro	LINEAR	·	1.8 km	MPC · JPL
165242	2000 SS_{140}	—	September 23, 2000	Socorro	LINEAR	·	1.7 km	MPC · JPL
165243	2000 ST_{147}	—	September 24, 2000	Socorro	LINEAR	·	1.5 km	MPC · JPL
165244	2000 SG_{148}	—	September 24, 2000	Socorro	LINEAR	NYS	1.6 km	MPC · JPL
165245	2000 SN_{148}	—	September 24, 2000	Socorro	LINEAR	·	1.3 km	MPC · JPL
165246	2000 SW_{148}	—	September 24, 2000	Socorro	LINEAR	V	1.2 km	MPC · JPL
165247	2000 SC_{151}	—	September 24, 2000	Socorro	LINEAR	V	1.0 km	MPC · JPL
165248	2000 SD_{152}	—	September 24, 2000	Socorro	LINEAR	NYS	1.4 km	MPC · JPL
165249	2000 SD_{154}	—	September 24, 2000	Socorro	LINEAR	V	1 km	MPC · JPL
165250	2000 SD_{158}	—	September 27, 2000	Socorro	LINEAR	·	1.7 km	MPC · JPL
165251	2000 SA_{176}	—	September 28, 2000	Socorro	LINEAR	·	1.8 km	MPC · JPL
165252	2000 ST_{182}	—	September 20, 2000	Kitt Peak	Spacewatch	·	2.3 km	MPC · JPL
165253	2000 ST_{193}	—	September 24, 2000	Socorro	LINEAR	·	850 m	MPC · JPL
165254	2000 SC_{205}	—	September 24, 2000	Socorro	LINEAR	·	1.0 km	MPC · JPL
165255	2000 SN_{206}	—	September 24, 2000	Socorro	LINEAR	·	1 km	MPC · JPL
165256	2000 SQ_{206}	—	September 24, 2000	Socorro	LINEAR	·	1.9 km	MPC · JPL
165257	2000 SY_{206}	—	September 24, 2000	Socorro	LINEAR	V	1.3 km	MPC · JPL
165258	2000 SO_{208}	—	September 25, 2000	Socorro	LINEAR	·	1.8 km	MPC · JPL
165259	2000 SM_{218}	—	September 26, 2000	Socorro	LINEAR	·	1.8 km	MPC · JPL
165260	2000 SH_{220}	—	September 26, 2000	Socorro	LINEAR	V	1.1 km	MPC · JPL
165261	2000 SA_{226}	—	September 27, 2000	Socorro	LINEAR	·	2.2 km	MPC · JPL
165262	2000 SD_{228}	—	September 28, 2000	Socorro	LINEAR	·	920 m	MPC · JPL
165263	2000 SN_{228}	—	September 28, 2000	Socorro	LINEAR	·	1.5 km	MPC · JPL
165264	2000 SH_{236}	—	September 24, 2000	Socorro	LINEAR	·	1.7 km	MPC · JPL
165265	2000 SW_{236}	—	September 24, 2000	Socorro	LINEAR	·	1.9 km	MPC · JPL
165266	2000 SY_{240}	—	September 27, 2000	Socorro	LINEAR	PHO	2.4 km	MPC · JPL
165267	2000 SO_{243}	—	September 24, 2000	Socorro	LINEAR	·	1.6 km	MPC · JPL
165268	2000 ST_{250}	—	September 24, 2000	Socorro	LINEAR	·	3.1 km	MPC · JPL
165269	2000 SE_{251}	—	September 24, 2000	Socorro	LINEAR	·	1.3 km	MPC · JPL
165270	2000 SJ_{255}	—	September 24, 2000	Socorro	LINEAR	·	1.5 km	MPC · JPL
165271	2000 SQ_{259}	—	September 24, 2000	Socorro	LINEAR	·	1.8 km	MPC · JPL
165272	2000 SP_{264}	—	September 26, 2000	Socorro	LINEAR	NYS	1.4 km	MPC · JPL
165273	2000 SM_{269}	—	September 27, 2000	Socorro	LINEAR	·	1.5 km	MPC · JPL
165274	2000 SH_{271}	—	September 27, 2000	Socorro	LINEAR	V	1.2 km	MPC · JPL
165275	2000 SP_{272}	—	September 28, 2000	Socorro	LINEAR	ERI	2.9 km	MPC · JPL
165276	2000 SJ_{280}	—	September 30, 2000	Socorro	LINEAR	·	2.1 km	MPC · JPL
165277	2000 ST_{298}	—	September 28, 2000	Socorro	LINEAR	·	1.5 km	MPC · JPL
165278	2000 SG_{302}	—	September 28, 2000	Socorro	LINEAR	·	1.4 km	MPC · JPL
165279	2000 SK_{304}	—	September 30, 2000	Socorro	LINEAR	·	2.0 km	MPC · JPL
165280	2000 SO_{305}	—	September 30, 2000	Socorro	LINEAR	·	1.9 km	MPC · JPL
165281	2000 SS_{326}	—	September 29, 2000	Kitt Peak	Spacewatch	·	1.2 km	MPC · JPL
165282	2000 SW_{326}	—	September 29, 2000	Kitt Peak	Spacewatch	NYS	1.6 km	MPC · JPL
165283	2000 ST_{327}	—	September 30, 2000	Socorro	LINEAR	·	2.5 km	MPC · JPL
165284	2000 ST_{341}	—	September 24, 2000	Socorro	LINEAR	·	2.2 km	MPC · JPL
165285	2000 SX_{341}	—	September 24, 2000	Kitt Peak	Spacewatch	MAS	850 m	MPC · JPL
165286	2000 SS_{343}	—	September 23, 2000	Socorro	LINEAR	·	3.4 km	MPC · JPL
165287	2000 SK_{353}	—	September 30, 2000	Anderson Mesa	LONEOS	·	1.9 km	MPC · JPL
165288	2000 SN_{355}	—	September 29, 2000	Anderson Mesa	LONEOS	·	1.6 km	MPC · JPL
165289	2000 SA_{356}	—	September 29, 2000	Anderson Mesa	LONEOS	·	1.9 km	MPC · JPL
165290	2000 SV_{361}	—	September 23, 2000	Anderson Mesa	LONEOS	·	1.2 km	MPC · JPL
165291	2000 SB_{365}	—	September 21, 2000	Anderson Mesa	LONEOS	·	950 m	MPC · JPL
165292	2000 SZ_{367}	—	September 24, 2000	Socorro	LINEAR	(2076)	1.1 km	MPC · JPL
165293	2000 TU_{8}	—	October 1, 2000	Socorro	LINEAR	·	1.7 km	MPC · JPL
165294	2000 TG_{15}	—	October 1, 2000	Socorro	LINEAR	·	1.2 km	MPC · JPL
165295	2000 TR_{15}	—	October 1, 2000	Socorro	LINEAR	NYS	1.6 km	MPC · JPL
165296	2000 TC_{23}	—	October 1, 2000	Socorro	LINEAR	·	1.4 km	MPC · JPL
165297	2000 TA_{36}	—	October 6, 2000	Anderson Mesa	LONEOS	·	1.5 km	MPC · JPL
165298	2000 TA_{40}	—	October 1, 2000	Socorro	LINEAR	·	1.5 km	MPC · JPL
165299	2000 TF_{47}	—	October 1, 2000	Anderson Mesa	LONEOS	·	1.3 km	MPC · JPL
165300	2000 TY_{66}	—	October 2, 2000	Socorro	LINEAR	·	1.2 km	MPC · JPL

== 165301–165400 ==
back to top

Designation			Discovery			Properties		Ref
Permanent	Provisional	Named after	Date	Site	Discoverer(s)	Category	Diam.	Ref
165301	2000 US_{3}	—	October 24, 2000	Socorro	LINEAR	·	1.7 km	MPC · JPL
165302	2000 UK_{10}	—	October 24, 2000	Socorro	LINEAR	·	1.9 km	MPC · JPL
165303	2000 UO_{20}	—	October 24, 2000	Socorro	LINEAR	NYS ·	2.9 km	MPC · JPL
165304	2000 UV_{20}	—	October 24, 2000	Socorro	LINEAR	NYS	1.5 km	MPC · JPL
165305	2000 UO_{22}	—	October 24, 2000	Socorro	LINEAR	NYS	1.5 km	MPC · JPL
165306	2000 US_{23}	—	October 24, 2000	Socorro	LINEAR	T_{j} (2.97) · HIL · 3:2	5.5 km	MPC · JPL
165307	2000 UC_{25}	—	October 24, 2000	Socorro	LINEAR	·	1.6 km	MPC · JPL
165308	2000 UY_{26}	—	October 24, 2000	Socorro	LINEAR	·	1.5 km	MPC · JPL
165309	2000 UU_{28}	—	October 30, 2000	Socorro	LINEAR	·	1.6 km	MPC · JPL
165310	2000 UP_{36}	—	October 24, 2000	Socorro	LINEAR	·	1.6 km	MPC · JPL
165311	2000 UE_{46}	—	October 24, 2000	Socorro	LINEAR	·	1.7 km	MPC · JPL
165312	2000 UH_{51}	—	October 24, 2000	Socorro	LINEAR	·	1.5 km	MPC · JPL
165313	2000 US_{54}	—	October 24, 2000	Socorro	LINEAR	·	2.2 km	MPC · JPL
165314	2000 UC_{57}	—	October 25, 2000	Socorro	LINEAR	NYS ·	2.6 km	MPC · JPL
165315	2000 UT_{57}	—	October 25, 2000	Socorro	LINEAR	·	1.4 km	MPC · JPL
165316	2000 UU_{65}	—	October 25, 2000	Socorro	LINEAR	·	1.6 km	MPC · JPL
165317	2000 UT_{71}	—	October 25, 2000	Socorro	LINEAR	·	1.7 km	MPC · JPL
165318	2000 UH_{72}	—	October 25, 2000	Socorro	LINEAR	NYS	2.1 km	MPC · JPL
165319	2000 UJ_{72}	—	October 25, 2000	Socorro	LINEAR	·	2.5 km	MPC · JPL
165320	2000 UX_{72}	—	October 25, 2000	Socorro	LINEAR	·	1.9 km	MPC · JPL
165321	2000 UC_{74}	—	October 27, 2000	Socorro	LINEAR	·	1.1 km	MPC · JPL
165322	2000 UN_{77}	—	October 24, 2000	Socorro	LINEAR	NYS	1.6 km	MPC · JPL
165323	2000 UD_{78}	—	October 24, 2000	Socorro	LINEAR	·	2.9 km	MPC · JPL
165324	2000 UK_{80}	—	October 24, 2000	Socorro	LINEAR	·	1.8 km	MPC · JPL
165325	2000 UU_{87}	—	October 31, 2000	Socorro	LINEAR	·	1.5 km	MPC · JPL
165326	2000 UB_{91}	—	October 25, 2000	Socorro	LINEAR	·	1.7 km	MPC · JPL
165327	2000 UQ_{91}	—	October 25, 2000	Socorro	LINEAR	·	1.1 km	MPC · JPL
165328	2000 UY_{92}	—	October 25, 2000	Socorro	LINEAR	·	1.9 km	MPC · JPL
165329	2000 UV_{96}	—	October 25, 2000	Socorro	LINEAR	·	1.8 km	MPC · JPL
165330	2000 UM_{105}	—	October 29, 2000	Socorro	LINEAR	V	1.2 km	MPC · JPL
165331	2000 UX_{106}	—	October 30, 2000	Socorro	LINEAR	·	1.6 km	MPC · JPL
165332	2000 VS	—	November 1, 2000	Kitt Peak	Spacewatch	·	2.3 km	MPC · JPL
165333	2000 VT_{5}	—	November 1, 2000	Socorro	LINEAR	·	1.6 km	MPC · JPL
165334	2000 VX_{6}	—	November 1, 2000	Socorro	LINEAR	·	1.5 km	MPC · JPL
165335	2000 VZ_{11}	—	November 1, 2000	Socorro	LINEAR	·	1.7 km	MPC · JPL
165336	2000 VS_{15}	—	November 1, 2000	Socorro	LINEAR	·	1.4 km	MPC · JPL
165337	2000 VX_{16}	—	November 1, 2000	Socorro	LINEAR	·	1.7 km	MPC · JPL
165338	2000 VC_{17}	—	November 1, 2000	Socorro	LINEAR	NYS ·	1.7 km	MPC · JPL
165339	2000 VA_{18}	—	November 1, 2000	Socorro	LINEAR	V	1.2 km	MPC · JPL
165340	2000 VC_{24}	—	November 1, 2000	Socorro	LINEAR	·	1.9 km	MPC · JPL
165341	2000 VN_{30}	—	November 1, 2000	Socorro	LINEAR	·	2.4 km	MPC · JPL
165342	2000 VA_{31}	—	November 1, 2000	Socorro	LINEAR	MAS	1.2 km	MPC · JPL
165343	2000 VJ_{37}	—	November 1, 2000	Socorro	LINEAR	·	3.3 km	MPC · JPL
165344	2000 VB_{47}	—	November 3, 2000	Socorro	LINEAR	ERI	2.4 km	MPC · JPL
165345	2000 VF_{52}	—	November 3, 2000	Socorro	LINEAR	V	1.2 km	MPC · JPL
165346	2000 VH_{53}	—	November 3, 2000	Socorro	LINEAR	·	1.9 km	MPC · JPL
165347 Philplait	2000 WG_{11}	Philplait	November 23, 2000	Junk Bond	J. Medkeff	NYS	1.8 km	MPC · JPL
165348	2000 WO_{14}	—	November 20, 2000	Socorro	LINEAR	·	1.4 km	MPC · JPL
165349	2000 WL_{16}	—	November 21, 2000	Socorro	LINEAR	·	1.8 km	MPC · JPL
165350	2000 WW_{16}	—	November 21, 2000	Socorro	LINEAR	MAS	1.1 km	MPC · JPL
165351	2000 WY_{21}	—	November 20, 2000	Socorro	LINEAR	·	2.0 km	MPC · JPL
165352	2000 WQ_{26}	—	November 25, 2000	Socorro	LINEAR	NYS	1.4 km	MPC · JPL
165353	2000 WR_{48}	—	November 21, 2000	Socorro	LINEAR	·	3.3 km	MPC · JPL
165354	2000 WU_{48}	—	November 21, 2000	Socorro	LINEAR	·	2.3 km	MPC · JPL
165355	2000 WC_{58}	—	November 21, 2000	Socorro	LINEAR	·	2.2 km	MPC · JPL
165356	2000 WE_{69}	—	November 19, 2000	Socorro	LINEAR	·	1.6 km	MPC · JPL
165357	2000 WJ_{74}	—	November 20, 2000	Socorro	LINEAR	ERI	2.7 km	MPC · JPL
165358	2000 WV_{74}	—	November 20, 2000	Socorro	LINEAR	·	1.4 km	MPC · JPL
165359	2000 WS_{75}	—	November 20, 2000	Socorro	LINEAR	·	1.6 km	MPC · JPL
165360	2000 WA_{77}	—	November 20, 2000	Socorro	LINEAR	·	1.8 km	MPC · JPL
165361	2000 WZ_{87}	—	November 20, 2000	Socorro	LINEAR	·	5.0 km	MPC · JPL
165362	2000 WY_{90}	—	November 21, 2000	Socorro	LINEAR	·	1.7 km	MPC · JPL
165363	2000 WH_{91}	—	November 21, 2000	Socorro	LINEAR	·	2.0 km	MPC · JPL
165364	2000 WM_{96}	—	November 21, 2000	Socorro	LINEAR	·	1.6 km	MPC · JPL
165365	2000 WA_{102}	—	November 26, 2000	Socorro	LINEAR	·	1.6 km	MPC · JPL
165366	2000 WF_{104}	—	November 27, 2000	Socorro	LINEAR	·	2.8 km	MPC · JPL
165367	2000 WY_{104}	—	November 25, 2000	Kitt Peak	Spacewatch	·	1.3 km	MPC · JPL
165368	2000 WH_{105}	—	November 27, 2000	Kitt Peak	Spacewatch	MAS	940 m	MPC · JPL
165369	2000 WJ_{106}	—	November 28, 2000	Haleakala	NEAT	PHO	2.1 km	MPC · JPL
165370	2000 WW_{110}	—	November 20, 2000	Socorro	LINEAR	·	2.3 km	MPC · JPL
165371	2000 WZ_{110}	—	November 20, 2000	Socorro	LINEAR	·	2.1 km	MPC · JPL
165372	2000 WT_{111}	—	November 20, 2000	Socorro	LINEAR	·	2.2 km	MPC · JPL
165373	2000 WV_{111}	—	November 20, 2000	Socorro	LINEAR	·	2.1 km	MPC · JPL
165374	2000 WB_{114}	—	November 20, 2000	Socorro	LINEAR	NYS	2.1 km	MPC · JPL
165375	2000 WL_{119}	—	November 20, 2000	Socorro	LINEAR	·	2.1 km	MPC · JPL
165376	2000 WD_{120}	—	November 20, 2000	Socorro	LINEAR	·	1.5 km	MPC · JPL
165377	2000 WR_{136}	—	November 20, 2000	Socorro	LINEAR	V	1.1 km	MPC · JPL
165378	2000 WN_{139}	—	November 21, 2000	Socorro	LINEAR	NYS	1.8 km	MPC · JPL
165379	2000 WA_{144}	—	November 21, 2000	Socorro	LINEAR	·	3.1 km	MPC · JPL
165380	2000 WF_{146}	—	November 23, 2000	Haleakala	NEAT	PHO	2.0 km	MPC · JPL
165381	2000 WD_{156}	—	November 30, 2000	Socorro	LINEAR	·	1.8 km	MPC · JPL
165382	2000 WN_{156}	—	November 30, 2000	Socorro	LINEAR	V	1.0 km	MPC · JPL
165383	2000 WA_{173}	—	November 25, 2000	Anderson Mesa	LONEOS	·	2.2 km	MPC · JPL
165384	2000 WU_{175}	—	November 26, 2000	Kitt Peak	Spacewatch	MAS	960 m	MPC · JPL
165385	2000 WY_{176}	—	November 27, 2000	Socorro	LINEAR	·	1.8 km	MPC · JPL
165386	2000 WC_{178}	—	November 28, 2000	Kitt Peak	Spacewatch	·	1.4 km	MPC · JPL
165387	2000 WF_{187}	—	November 18, 2000	Anderson Mesa	LONEOS	·	2.1 km	MPC · JPL
165388	2000 WV_{187}	—	November 16, 2000	Anderson Mesa	LONEOS	V	1.0 km	MPC · JPL
165389	2000 WC_{188}	—	November 16, 2000	Anderson Mesa	LONEOS	·	1.4 km	MPC · JPL
165390	2000 XK_{2}	—	December 1, 2000	Bohyunsan	Bohyunsan	·	2.4 km	MPC · JPL
165391	2000 XB_{4}	—	December 1, 2000	Socorro	LINEAR	·	2.1 km	MPC · JPL
165392	2000 XT_{5}	—	December 1, 2000	Socorro	LINEAR	·	2.1 km	MPC · JPL
165393	2000 XY_{11}	—	December 4, 2000	Socorro	LINEAR	·	2.1 km	MPC · JPL
165394	2000 XC_{15}	—	December 5, 2000	Socorro	LINEAR	·	3.6 km	MPC · JPL
165395	2000 XN_{16}	—	December 1, 2000	Socorro	LINEAR	·	2.3 km	MPC · JPL
165396	2000 XX_{16}	—	December 1, 2000	Socorro	LINEAR	·	3.2 km	MPC · JPL
165397	2000 XN_{18}	—	December 4, 2000	Socorro	LINEAR	·	1.2 km	MPC · JPL
165398	2000 XE_{23}	—	December 4, 2000	Socorro	LINEAR	·	1.7 km	MPC · JPL
165399	2000 XK_{28}	—	December 4, 2000	Socorro	LINEAR	PHO	1.4 km	MPC · JPL
165400	2000 XK_{32}	—	December 4, 2000	Socorro	LINEAR	·	2.2 km	MPC · JPL

== 165401–165500 ==
back to top

Designation			Discovery			Properties		Ref
Permanent	Provisional	Named after	Date	Site	Discoverer(s)	Category	Diam.	Ref
165401	2000 XA_{33}	—	December 4, 2000	Socorro	LINEAR	ERI	2.7 km	MPC · JPL
165402	2000 XX_{34}	—	December 4, 2000	Socorro	LINEAR	·	3.1 km	MPC · JPL
165403	2000 XM_{43}	—	December 5, 2000	Socorro	LINEAR	PHO	4.2 km	MPC · JPL
165404	2000 XU_{44}	—	December 8, 2000	Socorro	LINEAR	PHO	3.0 km	MPC · JPL
165405	2000 XB_{48}	—	December 4, 2000	Socorro	LINEAR	V	1.0 km	MPC · JPL
165406	2000 XT_{53}	—	December 14, 2000	Bohyunsan	Jeon, Y.-B., Lee, B.-C.	MAS	960 m	MPC · JPL
165407	2000 YA_{10}	—	December 20, 2000	Socorro	LINEAR	·	2.9 km	MPC · JPL
165408	2000 YV_{10}	—	December 22, 2000	Socorro	LINEAR	·	2.1 km	MPC · JPL
165409	2000 YP_{15}	—	December 26, 2000	Kitt Peak	Spacewatch	NYS	1.8 km	MPC · JPL
165410	2000 YN_{19}	—	December 26, 2000	Kitt Peak	Spacewatch	NYS	1.7 km	MPC · JPL
165411	2000 YJ_{22}	—	December 27, 2000	Kitt Peak	Spacewatch	·	2.2 km	MPC · JPL
165412	2000 YK_{24}	—	December 28, 2000	Kitt Peak	Spacewatch	NYS	2.4 km	MPC · JPL
165413	2000 YD_{30}	—	December 29, 2000	Haleakala	NEAT	·	2.8 km	MPC · JPL
165414	2000 YW_{30}	—	December 26, 2000	Kitt Peak	Spacewatch	·	4.0 km	MPC · JPL
165415	2000 YK_{35}	—	December 30, 2000	Socorro	LINEAR	·	1.6 km	MPC · JPL
165416	2000 YF_{36}	—	December 30, 2000	Socorro	LINEAR	NYS	2.0 km	MPC · JPL
165417	2000 YK_{36}	—	December 30, 2000	Socorro	LINEAR	NYS	1.6 km	MPC · JPL
165418	2000 YH_{51}	—	December 30, 2000	Socorro	LINEAR	·	2.6 km	MPC · JPL
165419	2000 YY_{52}	—	December 30, 2000	Socorro	LINEAR	·	2.8 km	MPC · JPL
165420	2000 YH_{53}	—	December 30, 2000	Socorro	LINEAR	·	2.7 km	MPC · JPL
165421	2000 YL_{53}	—	December 30, 2000	Socorro	LINEAR	·	3.5 km	MPC · JPL
165422	2000 YQ_{53}	—	December 30, 2000	Socorro	LINEAR	·	2.4 km	MPC · JPL
165423	2000 YB_{54}	—	December 30, 2000	Socorro	LINEAR	·	2.1 km	MPC · JPL
165424	2000 YF_{59}	—	December 30, 2000	Socorro	LINEAR	NYS	2.0 km	MPC · JPL
165425	2000 YK_{60}	—	December 30, 2000	Socorro	LINEAR	V	1.5 km	MPC · JPL
165426	2000 YO_{60}	—	December 30, 2000	Socorro	LINEAR	·	2.3 km	MPC · JPL
165427	2000 YF_{62}	—	December 30, 2000	Socorro	LINEAR	V	1.4 km	MPC · JPL
165428	2000 YR_{62}	—	December 30, 2000	Socorro	LINEAR	NYS	2.3 km	MPC · JPL
165429	2000 YW_{66}	—	December 30, 2000	Kitt Peak	Spacewatch	MAS	1.1 km	MPC · JPL
165430	2000 YV_{69}	—	December 30, 2000	Socorro	LINEAR	·	1.8 km	MPC · JPL
165431	2000 YQ_{71}	—	December 30, 2000	Socorro	LINEAR	·	2.1 km	MPC · JPL
165432	2000 YA_{72}	—	December 30, 2000	Socorro	LINEAR	·	2.0 km	MPC · JPL
165433	2000 YD_{72}	—	December 30, 2000	Socorro	LINEAR	·	3.0 km	MPC · JPL
165434	2000 YC_{75}	—	December 30, 2000	Socorro	LINEAR	·	2.0 km	MPC · JPL
165435	2000 YO_{77}	—	December 30, 2000	Socorro	LINEAR	MAS	1.2 km	MPC · JPL
165436	2000 YD_{79}	—	December 30, 2000	Socorro	LINEAR	·	1.8 km	MPC · JPL
165437	2000 YM_{86}	—	December 30, 2000	Socorro	LINEAR	·	1.8 km	MPC · JPL
165438	2000 YG_{87}	—	December 30, 2000	Socorro	LINEAR	MAS	1.3 km	MPC · JPL
165439	2000 YK_{87}	—	December 30, 2000	Socorro	LINEAR	·	2.0 km	MPC · JPL
165440	2000 YD_{92}	—	December 30, 2000	Socorro	LINEAR	NYS	1.7 km	MPC · JPL
165441	2000 YY_{95}	—	December 30, 2000	Socorro	LINEAR	·	2.0 km	MPC · JPL
165442	2000 YA_{99}	—	December 30, 2000	Socorro	LINEAR	MAS	1.1 km	MPC · JPL
165443	2000 YA_{102}	—	December 28, 2000	Socorro	LINEAR	·	2.2 km	MPC · JPL
165444	2000 YK_{104}	—	December 28, 2000	Socorro	LINEAR	·	3.0 km	MPC · JPL
165445	2000 YM_{106}	—	December 30, 2000	Socorro	LINEAR	·	2.6 km	MPC · JPL
165446	2000 YG_{108}	—	December 30, 2000	Socorro	LINEAR	NYS	1.8 km	MPC · JPL
165447	2000 YV_{108}	—	December 30, 2000	Socorro	LINEAR	NYS	1.7 km	MPC · JPL
165448	2000 YN_{111}	—	December 30, 2000	Socorro	LINEAR	·	2.8 km	MPC · JPL
165449	2000 YR_{111}	—	December 30, 2000	Socorro	LINEAR	·	2.1 km	MPC · JPL
165450	2000 YB_{114}	—	December 30, 2000	Socorro	LINEAR	NYS	1.5 km	MPC · JPL
165451	2000 YN_{115}	—	December 30, 2000	Socorro	LINEAR	·	2.9 km	MPC · JPL
165452	2000 YA_{116}	—	December 30, 2000	Socorro	LINEAR	·	2.3 km	MPC · JPL
165453	2000 YC_{118}	—	December 30, 2000	Socorro	LINEAR	KON	4.1 km	MPC · JPL
165454	2000 YT_{119}	—	December 17, 2000	Kitt Peak	Spacewatch	·	2.4 km	MPC · JPL
165455	2000 YU_{119}	—	December 17, 2000	Kitt Peak	Spacewatch	NYS	1.7 km	MPC · JPL
165456	2000 YL_{125}	—	December 29, 2000	Anderson Mesa	LONEOS	EUN	3.3 km	MPC · JPL
165457	2000 YE_{127}	—	December 29, 2000	Kitt Peak	Spacewatch	NYS	1.5 km	MPC · JPL
165458	2000 YV_{129}	—	December 30, 2000	Socorro	LINEAR	·	2.2 km	MPC · JPL
165459	2000 YC_{131}	—	December 30, 2000	Socorro	LINEAR	MAS	1.1 km	MPC · JPL
165460	2000 YE_{134}	—	December 31, 2000	Kitt Peak	Spacewatch	MAS	1.1 km	MPC · JPL
165461	2000 YD_{137}	—	December 23, 2000	Socorro	LINEAR	·	3.3 km	MPC · JPL
165462	2001 AY_{2}	—	January 2, 2001	Kitt Peak	Spacewatch	·	2.1 km	MPC · JPL
165463	2001 AK_{11}	—	January 2, 2001	Socorro	LINEAR	·	2.5 km	MPC · JPL
165464	2001 AY_{19}	—	January 4, 2001	Socorro	LINEAR	slow	2.1 km	MPC · JPL
165465	2001 AS_{20}	—	January 3, 2001	Socorro	LINEAR	·	2.3 km	MPC · JPL
165466	2001 AF_{28}	—	January 5, 2001	Socorro	LINEAR	·	3.0 km	MPC · JPL
165467	2001 AA_{29}	—	January 4, 2001	Socorro	LINEAR	·	2.0 km	MPC · JPL
165468	2001 AC_{29}	—	January 4, 2001	Socorro	LINEAR	NYS	1.7 km	MPC · JPL
165469	2001 AL_{32}	—	January 4, 2001	Socorro	LINEAR	·	2.8 km	MPC · JPL
165470	2001 AC_{35}	—	January 5, 2001	Socorro	LINEAR	·	3.3 km	MPC · JPL
165471	2001 AP_{35}	—	January 5, 2001	Socorro	LINEAR	·	2.2 km	MPC · JPL
165472	2001 AC_{36}	—	January 5, 2001	Socorro	LINEAR	V	1.3 km	MPC · JPL
165473	2001 AX_{37}	—	January 5, 2001	Socorro	LINEAR	H	980 m	MPC · JPL
165474	2001 AR_{39}	—	January 3, 2001	Socorro	LINEAR	·	2.2 km	MPC · JPL
165475	2001 AZ_{39}	—	January 3, 2001	Anderson Mesa	LONEOS	·	2.3 km	MPC · JPL
165476	2001 AQ_{40}	—	January 3, 2001	Anderson Mesa	LONEOS	NYS	1.9 km	MPC · JPL
165477	2001 AP_{44}	—	January 15, 2001	Oizumi	T. Kobayashi	NYS	2.5 km	MPC · JPL
165478	2001 AQ_{46}	—	January 15, 2001	Socorro	LINEAR	·	3.4 km	MPC · JPL
165479	2001 AK_{49}	—	January 15, 2001	Socorro	LINEAR	·	2.7 km	MPC · JPL
165480	2001 AJ_{50}	—	January 14, 2001	Kitt Peak	Spacewatch	V	1.0 km	MPC · JPL
165481	2001 AX_{50}	—	January 15, 2001	Kitt Peak	Spacewatch	·	1.8 km	MPC · JPL
165482	2001 BC	—	January 17, 2001	Oizumi	T. Kobayashi	·	2.8 km	MPC · JPL
165483	2001 BZ_{12}	—	January 19, 2001	Socorro	LINEAR	·	2.3 km	MPC · JPL
165484	2001 BO_{19}	—	January 19, 2001	Socorro	LINEAR	·	2.1 km	MPC · JPL
165485	2001 BU_{19}	—	January 19, 2001	Socorro	LINEAR	MAS	1.0 km	MPC · JPL
165486	2001 BR_{20}	—	January 19, 2001	Socorro	LINEAR	(5)	2.0 km	MPC · JPL
165487	2001 BS_{20}	—	January 19, 2001	Socorro	LINEAR	ERI	3.2 km	MPC · JPL
165488	2001 BK_{22}	—	January 20, 2001	Socorro	LINEAR	·	2.4 km	MPC · JPL
165489	2001 BQ_{23}	—	January 20, 2001	Socorro	LINEAR	·	1.8 km	MPC · JPL
165490	2001 BQ_{28}	—	January 20, 2001	Socorro	LINEAR	·	1.9 km	MPC · JPL
165491	2001 BA_{31}	—	January 20, 2001	Socorro	LINEAR	·	2.6 km	MPC · JPL
165492	2001 BL_{31}	—	January 20, 2001	Socorro	LINEAR	NYS	2.4 km	MPC · JPL
165493	2001 BP_{32}	—	January 20, 2001	Socorro	LINEAR	·	2.9 km	MPC · JPL
165494	2001 BD_{42}	—	January 25, 2001	Socorro	LINEAR	·	2.6 km	MPC · JPL
165495	2001 BY_{47}	—	January 21, 2001	Socorro	LINEAR	·	2.5 km	MPC · JPL
165496	2001 BH_{49}	—	January 21, 2001	Socorro	LINEAR	NYS	1.9 km	MPC · JPL
165497	2001 BC_{53}	—	January 17, 2001	Haleakala	NEAT	·	1.4 km	MPC · JPL
165498	2001 BH_{53}	—	January 17, 2001	Haleakala	NEAT	NYS	2.5 km	MPC · JPL
165499	2001 BN_{53}	—	January 17, 2001	Haleakala	NEAT	·	2.0 km	MPC · JPL
165500	2001 BC_{57}	—	January 19, 2001	Haleakala	NEAT	·	2.1 km	MPC · JPL

== 165501–165600 ==
back to top

Designation			Discovery			Properties		Ref
Permanent	Provisional	Named after	Date	Site	Discoverer(s)	Category	Diam.	Ref
165501	2001 BH_{65}	—	January 26, 2001	Socorro	LINEAR	EUN	2.0 km	MPC · JPL
165502	2001 BY_{67}	—	January 31, 2001	Socorro	LINEAR	·	2.8 km	MPC · JPL
165503	2001 BF_{69}	—	January 31, 2001	Socorro	LINEAR	NYS	2.3 km	MPC · JPL
165504	2001 BS_{72}	—	January 27, 2001	Haleakala	NEAT	·	2.4 km	MPC · JPL
165505	2001 BV_{76}	—	January 26, 2001	Socorro	LINEAR	ADE	3.5 km	MPC · JPL
165506	2001 BN_{79}	—	January 21, 2001	Socorro	LINEAR	MAS	1.2 km	MPC · JPL
165507	2001 CO_{1}	—	February 1, 2001	Socorro	LINEAR	NYS	3.2 km	MPC · JPL
165508	2001 CA_{3}	—	February 1, 2001	Socorro	LINEAR	·	2.3 km	MPC · JPL
165509	2001 CO_{4}	—	February 1, 2001	Socorro	LINEAR	·	2.5 km	MPC · JPL
165510	2001 CF_{5}	—	February 1, 2001	Socorro	LINEAR	(5)	2.7 km	MPC · JPL
165511	2001 CN_{6}	—	February 1, 2001	Socorro	LINEAR	NYS	1.9 km	MPC · JPL
165512	2001 CQ_{6}	—	February 1, 2001	Socorro	LINEAR	·	1.9 km	MPC · JPL
165513	2001 CT_{8}	—	February 1, 2001	Socorro	LINEAR	·	2.4 km	MPC · JPL
165514	2001 CA_{11}	—	February 1, 2001	Socorro	LINEAR	·	2.2 km	MPC · JPL
165515	2001 CH_{11}	—	February 1, 2001	Socorro	LINEAR	·	1.6 km	MPC · JPL
165516	2001 CA_{14}	—	February 1, 2001	Socorro	LINEAR	·	2.3 km	MPC · JPL
165517	2001 CZ_{14}	—	February 1, 2001	Socorro	LINEAR	·	2.3 km	MPC · JPL
165518	2001 CT_{16}	—	February 1, 2001	Socorro	LINEAR	·	2.3 km	MPC · JPL
165519	2001 CV_{17}	—	February 1, 2001	Socorro	LINEAR	·	4.0 km	MPC · JPL
165520	2001 CX_{18}	—	February 2, 2001	Socorro	LINEAR	·	2.6 km	MPC · JPL
165521	2001 CC_{19}	—	February 2, 2001	Socorro	LINEAR	NYS	2.2 km	MPC · JPL
165522	2001 CD_{20}	—	February 3, 2001	Socorro	LINEAR	V	1.4 km	MPC · JPL
165523	2001 CF_{20}	—	February 3, 2001	Socorro	LINEAR	·	5.6 km	MPC · JPL
165524	2001 CM_{22}	—	February 1, 2001	Anderson Mesa	LONEOS	·	3.0 km	MPC · JPL
165525	2001 CK_{23}	—	February 1, 2001	Anderson Mesa	LONEOS	·	2.4 km	MPC · JPL
165526	2001 CQ_{23}	—	February 1, 2001	Anderson Mesa	LONEOS	·	1.7 km	MPC · JPL
165527	2001 CY_{23}	—	February 1, 2001	Anderson Mesa	LONEOS	V	1.3 km	MPC · JPL
165528	2001 CK_{28}	—	February 2, 2001	Anderson Mesa	LONEOS	EUN	1.6 km	MPC · JPL
165529	2001 CE_{33}	—	February 13, 2001	Socorro	LINEAR	EUN	2.6 km	MPC · JPL
165530	2001 CG_{33}	—	February 13, 2001	Socorro	LINEAR	PHO	1.5 km	MPC · JPL
165531	2001 CD_{37}	—	February 15, 2001	Nogales	Tenagra II	L4	20 km	MPC · JPL
165532	2001 CG_{40}	—	February 13, 2001	Socorro	LINEAR	·	2.9 km	MPC · JPL
165533	2001 CB_{47}	—	February 13, 2001	Kitt Peak	Spacewatch	NYS	1.8 km	MPC · JPL
165534	2001 CC_{47}	—	February 13, 2001	Kitt Peak	Spacewatch	·	2.0 km	MPC · JPL
165535	2001 DZ	—	February 16, 2001	Nogales	Tenagra II	SUL	3.4 km	MPC · JPL
165536	2001 DC_{6}	—	February 16, 2001	Socorro	LINEAR	·	3.7 km	MPC · JPL
165537	2001 DN_{9}	—	February 16, 2001	Socorro	LINEAR	·	4.4 km	MPC · JPL
165538	2001 DV_{9}	—	February 16, 2001	Socorro	LINEAR	·	1.9 km	MPC · JPL
165539	2001 DQ_{14}	—	February 17, 2001	Nogales	Tenagra II	·	1.7 km	MPC · JPL
165540	2001 DV_{19}	—	February 16, 2001	Socorro	LINEAR	RAF · fast	1.7 km	MPC · JPL
165541	2001 DS_{20}	—	February 16, 2001	Socorro	LINEAR	·	2.1 km	MPC · JPL
165542	2001 DY_{22}	—	February 17, 2001	Socorro	LINEAR	NYS	2.5 km	MPC · JPL
165543	2001 DK_{29}	—	February 17, 2001	Socorro	LINEAR	·	1.9 km	MPC · JPL
165544	2001 DE_{30}	—	February 17, 2001	Socorro	LINEAR	·	1.7 km	MPC · JPL
165545	2001 DE_{36}	—	February 19, 2001	Socorro	LINEAR	·	2.3 km	MPC · JPL
165546	2001 DL_{36}	—	February 19, 2001	Socorro	LINEAR	·	2.5 km	MPC · JPL
165547	2001 DM_{37}	—	February 19, 2001	Socorro	LINEAR	MAS	1.4 km	MPC · JPL
165548	2001 DO_{37}	—	February 19, 2001	Socorro	LINEAR	·	2.5 km	MPC · JPL
165549	2001 DM_{39}	—	February 19, 2001	Socorro	LINEAR	·	2.3 km	MPC · JPL
165550	2001 DH_{40}	—	February 19, 2001	Socorro	LINEAR	·	2.0 km	MPC · JPL
165551	2001 DZ_{40}	—	February 19, 2001	Socorro	LINEAR	L4	14 km	MPC · JPL
165552	2001 DS_{42}	—	February 19, 2001	Socorro	LINEAR	EUN	2.2 km	MPC · JPL
165553	2001 DZ_{43}	—	February 19, 2001	Socorro	LINEAR	NYS	1.9 km	MPC · JPL
165554	2001 DA_{44}	—	February 19, 2001	Socorro	LINEAR	·	1.9 km	MPC · JPL
165555	2001 DD_{44}	—	February 19, 2001	Socorro	LINEAR	EUN	2.2 km	MPC · JPL
165556	2001 DO_{45}	—	February 19, 2001	Socorro	LINEAR	NYS	2.3 km	MPC · JPL
165557	2001 DR_{46}	—	February 19, 2001	Socorro	LINEAR	MAR	1.9 km	MPC · JPL
165558	2001 DN_{47}	—	February 17, 2001	Kitt Peak	Spacewatch	HIL · 3:2	9.8 km	MPC · JPL
165559	2001 DL_{48}	—	February 16, 2001	Socorro	LINEAR	·	2.2 km	MPC · JPL
165560	2001 DJ_{51}	—	February 16, 2001	Socorro	LINEAR	EUN	2.7 km	MPC · JPL
165561	2001 DV_{52}	—	February 17, 2001	Socorro	LINEAR	·	2.0 km	MPC · JPL
165562	2001 DD_{57}	—	February 16, 2001	Kitt Peak	Spacewatch	·	1.9 km	MPC · JPL
165563	2001 DK_{57}	—	February 16, 2001	Kitt Peak	Spacewatch	·	2.6 km	MPC · JPL
165564	2001 DF_{62}	—	February 19, 2001	Socorro	LINEAR	NYS	1.9 km	MPC · JPL
165565	2001 DL_{66}	—	February 19, 2001	Socorro	LINEAR	·	1.8 km	MPC · JPL
165566	2001 DA_{81}	—	February 26, 2001	Oizumi	T. Kobayashi	·	4.1 km	MPC · JPL
165567	2001 DU_{82}	—	February 22, 2001	Kitt Peak	Spacewatch	·	1.4 km	MPC · JPL
165568	2001 DG_{83}	—	February 22, 2001	Kitt Peak	Spacewatch	·	2.0 km	MPC · JPL
165569	2001 DG_{91}	—	February 20, 2001	Socorro	LINEAR	L4	11 km	MPC · JPL
165570	2001 DX_{91}	—	February 20, 2001	Kitt Peak	Spacewatch	MRX	1.6 km	MPC · JPL
165571	2001 DE_{92}	—	February 20, 2001	Kitt Peak	Spacewatch	·	2.4 km	MPC · JPL
165572	2001 DL_{97}	—	February 17, 2001	Socorro	LINEAR	·	1.9 km	MPC · JPL
165573	2001 DE_{102}	—	February 16, 2001	Socorro	LINEAR	·	2.3 km	MPC · JPL
165574 Deidre	2001 DH_{105}	Deidre	February 16, 2001	Anderson Mesa	LONEOS	·	3.6 km	MPC · JPL
165575	2001 DR_{107}	—	February 20, 2001	Kitt Peak	Spacewatch	·	1.9 km	MPC · JPL
165576	2001 DC_{108}	—	February 16, 2001	Anderson Mesa	LONEOS	·	2.1 km	MPC · JPL
165577	2001 EA	—	March 2, 2001	Haleakala	NEAT	·	2.6 km	MPC · JPL
165578	2001 EZ_{2}	—	March 3, 2001	Kitt Peak	Spacewatch	·	1.5 km	MPC · JPL
165579	2001 EA_{4}	—	March 2, 2001	Anderson Mesa	LONEOS	NYS	1.5 km	MPC · JPL
165580	2001 ES_{9}	—	March 2, 2001	Anderson Mesa	LONEOS	RAF	2.0 km	MPC · JPL
165581	2001 ER_{14}	—	March 15, 2001	Socorro	LINEAR	EUN	2.8 km	MPC · JPL
165582	2001 EA_{17}	—	March 3, 2001	Socorro	LINEAR	H	1.1 km	MPC · JPL
165583	2001 EF_{22}	—	March 15, 2001	Anderson Mesa	LONEOS	·	4.3 km	MPC · JPL
165584	2001 EX_{22}	—	March 15, 2001	Kitt Peak	Spacewatch	·	2.6 km	MPC · JPL
165585	2001 EY_{22}	—	March 15, 2001	Kitt Peak	Spacewatch	·	3.3 km	MPC · JPL
165586	2001 FH_{8}	—	March 18, 2001	Socorro	LINEAR	·	2.5 km	MPC · JPL
165587	2001 FW_{9}	—	March 20, 2001	Eskridge	G. Hug	·	2.1 km	MPC · JPL
165588	2001 FG_{18}	—	March 19, 2001	Anderson Mesa	LONEOS	·	3.2 km	MPC · JPL
165589	2001 FQ_{22}	—	March 21, 2001	Anderson Mesa	LONEOS	·	2.0 km	MPC · JPL
165590	2001 FY_{23}	—	March 19, 2001	Socorro	LINEAR	H	660 m	MPC · JPL
165591	2001 FU_{28}	—	March 19, 2001	Socorro	LINEAR	·	2.8 km	MPC · JPL
165592	2001 FJ_{30}	—	March 20, 2001	Haleakala	NEAT	·	2.7 km	MPC · JPL
165593	2001 FU_{31}	—	March 22, 2001	Kitt Peak	Spacewatch	·	2.9 km	MPC · JPL
165594	2001 FT_{40}	—	March 18, 2001	Socorro	LINEAR	EUN	4.2 km	MPC · JPL
165595	2001 FV_{40}	—	March 18, 2001	Socorro	LINEAR	·	5.1 km	MPC · JPL
165596	2001 FA_{41}	—	March 18, 2001	Socorro	LINEAR	·	2.2 km	MPC · JPL
165597	2001 FL_{43}	—	March 18, 2001	Socorro	LINEAR	·	3.1 km	MPC · JPL
165598	2001 FB_{46}	—	March 18, 2001	Socorro	LINEAR	·	2.7 km	MPC · JPL
165599	2001 FT_{47}	—	March 18, 2001	Socorro	LINEAR	·	3.3 km	MPC · JPL
165600	2001 FW_{49}	—	March 18, 2001	Socorro	LINEAR	·	5.6 km	MPC · JPL

== 165601–165700 ==
back to top

Designation			Discovery			Properties		Ref
Permanent	Provisional	Named after	Date	Site	Discoverer(s)	Category	Diam.	Ref
165601	2001 FK_{51}	—	March 18, 2001	Socorro	LINEAR	·	2.1 km	MPC · JPL
165602	2001 FH_{55}	—	March 21, 2001	Socorro	LINEAR	·	3.5 km	MPC · JPL
165603	2001 FM_{57}	—	March 23, 2001	Haleakala	NEAT	MAR	1.8 km	MPC · JPL
165604	2001 FC_{59}	—	March 19, 2001	Socorro	LINEAR	·	2.4 km	MPC · JPL
165605	2001 FQ_{61}	—	March 19, 2001	Socorro	LINEAR	·	2.2 km	MPC · JPL
165606	2001 FJ_{64}	—	March 19, 2001	Socorro	LINEAR	EUN	2.1 km	MPC · JPL
165607	2001 FS_{66}	—	March 19, 2001	Socorro	LINEAR	·	3.4 km	MPC · JPL
165608	2001 FX_{67}	—	March 19, 2001	Socorro	LINEAR	·	2.6 km	MPC · JPL
165609	2001 FN_{69}	—	March 19, 2001	Socorro	LINEAR	EUN	2.1 km	MPC · JPL
165610	2001 FU_{82}	—	March 23, 2001	Socorro	LINEAR	·	2.0 km	MPC · JPL
165611	2001 FC_{84}	—	March 26, 2001	Kitt Peak	Spacewatch	·	1.7 km	MPC · JPL
165612 Stackpole	2001 FP_{86}	Stackpole	March 23, 2001	Junk Bond	D. Healy	·	1.8 km	MPC · JPL
165613	2001 FH_{89}	—	March 27, 2001	Kitt Peak	Spacewatch	·	1.6 km	MPC · JPL
165614	2001 FC_{96}	—	March 16, 2001	Socorro	LINEAR	·	3.8 km	MPC · JPL
165615	2001 FD_{99}	—	March 16, 2001	Socorro	LINEAR	BRU	5.2 km	MPC · JPL
165616	2001 FF_{102}	—	March 17, 2001	Socorro	LINEAR	·	1.9 km	MPC · JPL
165617	2001 FS_{102}	—	March 18, 2001	Kitt Peak	Spacewatch	MAR	1.9 km	MPC · JPL
165618	2001 FE_{106}	—	March 18, 2001	Anderson Mesa	LONEOS	·	1.7 km	MPC · JPL
165619	2001 FA_{107}	—	March 18, 2001	Anderson Mesa	LONEOS	·	1.7 km	MPC · JPL
165620	2001 FF_{109}	—	March 18, 2001	Socorro	LINEAR	·	2.3 km	MPC · JPL
165621	2001 FU_{109}	—	March 18, 2001	Socorro	LINEAR	·	2.5 km	MPC · JPL
165622	2001 FZ_{109}	—	March 18, 2001	Socorro	LINEAR	BRU	4.4 km	MPC · JPL
165623	2001 FZ_{113}	—	March 19, 2001	Anderson Mesa	LONEOS	·	1.8 km	MPC · JPL
165624	2001 FQ_{128}	—	March 19, 2001	Uccle	T. Pauwels	·	2.1 km	MPC · JPL
165625	2001 FA_{130}	—	March 29, 2001	Socorro	LINEAR	·	4.1 km	MPC · JPL
165626	2001 FX_{135}	—	March 21, 2001	Socorro	LINEAR	·	4.8 km	MPC · JPL
165627	2001 FZ_{142}	—	March 23, 2001	Haleakala	NEAT	EUN	2.2 km	MPC · JPL
165628	2001 FT_{146}	—	March 24, 2001	Anderson Mesa	LONEOS	·	2.4 km	MPC · JPL
165629	2001 FL_{151}	—	March 24, 2001	Haleakala	NEAT	·	2.8 km	MPC · JPL
165630	2001 FC_{156}	—	March 26, 2001	Haleakala	NEAT	·	3.6 km	MPC · JPL
165631	2001 FM_{160}	—	March 29, 2001	Haleakala	NEAT	·	4.5 km	MPC · JPL
165632	2001 FF_{163}	—	March 18, 2001	Socorro	LINEAR	·	2.8 km	MPC · JPL
165633	2001 FR_{167}	—	March 19, 2001	Anderson Mesa	LONEOS	·	2.3 km	MPC · JPL
165634	2001 FA_{171}	—	March 24, 2001	Anderson Mesa	LONEOS	·	4.5 km	MPC · JPL
165635	2001 FC_{176}	—	March 16, 2001	Socorro	LINEAR	EUN	2.3 km	MPC · JPL
165636	2001 FL_{180}	—	March 20, 2001	Kitt Peak	Spacewatch	·	2.5 km	MPC · JPL
165637	2001 FA_{188}	—	March 21, 2001	Kitt Peak	Spacewatch	·	1.6 km	MPC · JPL
165638	2001 FH_{192}	—	March 21, 2001	Haleakala	NEAT	·	1.5 km	MPC · JPL
165639	2001 GO_{3}	—	April 15, 2001	Socorro	LINEAR	H	960 m	MPC · JPL
165640	2001 GO_{5}	—	April 15, 2001	Kitt Peak	Spacewatch	MAR	2.0 km	MPC · JPL
165641	2001 GG_{10}	—	April 15, 2001	Haleakala	NEAT	EUN	2.2 km	MPC · JPL
165642	2001 GJ_{11}	—	April 15, 2001	Socorro	LINEAR	·	4.2 km	MPC · JPL
165643	2001 GK_{11}	—	April 15, 2001	Socorro	LINEAR	·	3.2 km	MPC · JPL
165644	2001 HB_{2}	—	April 17, 2001	Socorro	LINEAR	(18466) · slow	4.0 km	MPC · JPL
165645	2001 HX_{17}	—	April 24, 2001	Kitt Peak	Spacewatch	ADE	2.8 km	MPC · JPL
165646	2001 HP_{19}	—	April 24, 2001	Kitt Peak	Spacewatch	·	2.4 km	MPC · JPL
165647	2001 HL_{24}	—	April 27, 2001	Kitt Peak	Spacewatch	AGN	1.7 km	MPC · JPL
165648	2001 HM_{25}	—	April 26, 2001	Kitt Peak	Spacewatch	NEM	3.3 km	MPC · JPL
165649	2001 HC_{33}	—	April 27, 2001	Socorro	LINEAR	·	2.0 km	MPC · JPL
165650	2001 HN_{36}	—	April 29, 2001	Socorro	LINEAR	·	6.8 km	MPC · JPL
165651	2001 HG_{42}	—	April 16, 2001	Socorro	LINEAR	·	3.2 km	MPC · JPL
165652	2001 HH_{44}	—	April 16, 2001	Anderson Mesa	LONEOS	·	4.6 km	MPC · JPL
165653	2001 JP_{3}	—	May 15, 2001	Haleakala	NEAT	·	4.7 km	MPC · JPL
165654	2001 JE_{11}	—	May 2, 2001	Kitt Peak	Spacewatch	·	4.0 km	MPC · JPL
165655	2001 KB_{2}	—	May 19, 2001	Ondřejov	P. Kušnirák, P. Pravec	·	3.3 km	MPC · JPL
165656	2001 KN_{16}	—	May 18, 2001	Socorro	LINEAR	·	3.8 km	MPC · JPL
165657	2001 KA_{18}	—	May 20, 2001	Bergisch Gladbach	W. Bickel	·	2.7 km	MPC · JPL
165658	2001 LX_{5}	—	June 12, 2001	Kitt Peak	Spacewatch	·	2.1 km	MPC · JPL
165659 Michaelhicks	2001 LZ_{6}	Michaelhicks	June 15, 2001	Haleakala	NEAT	T_{j} (2.95)	6.7 km	MPC · JPL
165660	2001 LE_{18}	—	June 15, 2001	Haleakala	NEAT	·	3.6 km	MPC · JPL
165661	2001 MJ_{1}	—	June 16, 2001	Palomar	NEAT	·	3.5 km	MPC · JPL
165662	2001 MS_{29}	—	June 27, 2001	Anderson Mesa	LONEOS	·	6.2 km	MPC · JPL
165663	2001 MT_{29}	—	June 27, 2001	Haleakala	NEAT	·	5.7 km	MPC · JPL
165664	2001 MO_{30}	—	June 30, 2001	Palomar	NEAT	VER	6.5 km	MPC · JPL
165665	2001 MJ_{31}	—	June 16, 2001	Anderson Mesa	LONEOS	EOS	3.2 km	MPC · JPL
165666	2001 NF_{1}	—	July 12, 2001	Palomar	NEAT	·	7.7 km	MPC · JPL
165667	2001 NO_{7}	—	July 13, 2001	Palomar	NEAT	·	2.5 km	MPC · JPL
165668	2001 NG_{12}	—	July 13, 2001	Haleakala	NEAT	·	4.7 km	MPC · JPL
165669	2001 NT_{16}	—	July 14, 2001	Palomar	NEAT	·	4.4 km	MPC · JPL
165670	2001 NH_{20}	—	July 13, 2001	Palomar	NEAT	·	5.1 km	MPC · JPL
165671	2001 OA_{1}	—	July 17, 2001	Haleakala	NEAT	·	2.9 km	MPC · JPL
165672	2001 ON_{1}	—	July 18, 2001	Palomar	NEAT	LIX	5.1 km	MPC · JPL
165673	2001 OJ_{15}	—	July 18, 2001	Palomar	NEAT	·	7.9 km	MPC · JPL
165674	2001 OV_{24}	—	July 16, 2001	Anderson Mesa	LONEOS	·	4.8 km	MPC · JPL
165675	2001 OD_{29}	—	July 18, 2001	Palomar	NEAT	EOS	3.2 km	MPC · JPL
165676	2001 OG_{41}	—	July 21, 2001	Palomar	NEAT	·	7.1 km	MPC · JPL
165677	2001 OG_{42}	—	July 22, 2001	Palomar	NEAT	·	7.0 km	MPC · JPL
165678	2001 OA_{51}	—	July 21, 2001	Palomar	NEAT	·	3.2 km	MPC · JPL
165679	2001 OU_{52}	—	July 21, 2001	Palomar	NEAT	EOS	4.0 km	MPC · JPL
165680	2001 OY_{58}	—	July 21, 2001	Haleakala	NEAT	EOS	4.1 km	MPC · JPL
165681	2001 OO_{64}	—	July 24, 2001	Haleakala	NEAT	·	4.5 km	MPC · JPL
165682	2001 OY_{65}	—	July 22, 2001	Socorro	LINEAR	·	8.6 km	MPC · JPL
165683	2001 OK_{68}	—	July 16, 2001	Anderson Mesa	LONEOS	·	7.0 km	MPC · JPL
165684	2001 OD_{71}	—	July 20, 2001	Palomar	NEAT	TIR	4.9 km	MPC · JPL
165685	2001 OA_{74}	—	July 27, 2001	Nacogdoches	W. D. Bruton, R. Brady	·	4.0 km	MPC · JPL
165686	2001 OY_{75}	—	July 27, 2001	Haleakala	NEAT	slow	4.1 km	MPC · JPL
165687	2001 OV_{81}	—	July 26, 2001	Haleakala	NEAT	EOS	4.7 km	MPC · JPL
165688	2001 OU_{87}	—	July 30, 2001	Palomar	NEAT	TIR	7.1 km	MPC · JPL
165689	2001 PY_{1}	—	August 8, 2001	Haleakala	NEAT	·	6.2 km	MPC · JPL
165690	2001 PA_{3}	—	August 3, 2001	Haleakala	NEAT	·	7.9 km	MPC · JPL
165691	2001 PM_{6}	—	August 10, 2001	Haleakala	NEAT	THM	4.2 km	MPC · JPL
165692	2001 PS_{16}	—	August 9, 2001	Palomar	NEAT	TIR	5.3 km	MPC · JPL
165693	2001 PC_{18}	—	August 9, 2001	Palomar	NEAT	·	4.9 km	MPC · JPL
165694 Calosisbaragli	2001 PQ_{28}	Calosisbaragli	August 14, 2001	San Marcello	M. Tombelli, A. Boattini	·	4.1 km	MPC · JPL
165695	2001 PT_{32}	—	August 10, 2001	Haleakala	NEAT	·	3.7 km	MPC · JPL
165696	2001 PQ_{34}	—	August 10, 2001	Palomar	NEAT	CYB	9.6 km	MPC · JPL
165697	2001 PR_{34}	—	August 10, 2001	Palomar	NEAT	·	4.8 km	MPC · JPL
165698	2001 PA_{44}	—	August 15, 2001	Haleakala	NEAT	HYG	4.3 km	MPC · JPL
165699	2001 PD_{44}	—	August 15, 2001	Haleakala	NEAT	·	3.8 km	MPC · JPL
165700	2001 PQ_{44}	—	August 15, 2001	Haleakala	NEAT	·	6.0 km	MPC · JPL

== 165701–165800 ==
back to top

Designation			Discovery			Properties		Ref
Permanent	Provisional	Named after	Date	Site	Discoverer(s)	Category	Diam.	Ref
165701	2001 PN_{46}	—	August 12, 2001	Palomar	NEAT	·	3.5 km	MPC · JPL
165702	2001 PA_{59}	—	August 14, 2001	Haleakala	NEAT	·	5.3 km	MPC · JPL
165703	2001 PH_{60}	—	August 13, 2001	Haleakala	NEAT	HYG	5.3 km	MPC · JPL
165704	2001 PD_{61}	—	August 13, 2001	Haleakala	NEAT	HYG	4.7 km	MPC · JPL
165705	2001 PP_{61}	—	August 13, 2001	Haleakala	NEAT	THM	4.0 km	MPC · JPL
165706	2001 PW_{64}	—	August 1, 2001	Palomar	NEAT	·	3.9 km	MPC · JPL
165707	2001 PQ_{65}	—	August 13, 2001	Haleakala	NEAT	·	3.8 km	MPC · JPL
165708	2001 PB_{66}	—	August 15, 2001	Haleakala	NEAT	·	6.4 km	MPC · JPL
165709	2001 PD_{67}	—	August 9, 2001	Palomar	NEAT	·	6.5 km	MPC · JPL
165710	2001 QC_{1}	—	August 16, 2001	Socorro	LINEAR	·	4.6 km	MPC · JPL
165711	2001 QY_{19}	—	August 16, 2001	Socorro	LINEAR	·	4.3 km	MPC · JPL
165712	2001 QV_{33}	—	August 17, 2001	Ondřejov	P. Kušnirák, U. Babiaková	THM	3.5 km	MPC · JPL
165713	2001 QF_{35}	—	August 16, 2001	Socorro	LINEAR	·	4.3 km	MPC · JPL
165714	2001 QR_{36}	—	August 16, 2001	Socorro	LINEAR	KON	4.8 km	MPC · JPL
165715	2001 QP_{39}	—	August 16, 2001	Socorro	LINEAR	·	3.8 km	MPC · JPL
165716	2001 QN_{42}	—	August 16, 2001	Socorro	LINEAR	·	4.1 km	MPC · JPL
165717	2001 QR_{45}	—	August 16, 2001	Socorro	LINEAR	URS	6.6 km	MPC · JPL
165718	2001 QV_{53}	—	August 16, 2001	Socorro	LINEAR	·	5.7 km	MPC · JPL
165719	2001 QB_{56}	—	August 16, 2001	Socorro	LINEAR	EOS	3.4 km	MPC · JPL
165720	2001 QX_{59}	—	August 18, 2001	Socorro	LINEAR	·	4.8 km	MPC · JPL
165721	2001 QZ_{63}	—	August 16, 2001	Socorro	LINEAR	·	7.2 km	MPC · JPL
165722	2001 QP_{68}	—	August 20, 2001	Oakley	Wolfe, C.	TIR	6.3 km	MPC · JPL
165723	2001 QZ_{81}	—	August 17, 2001	Socorro	LINEAR	·	5.9 km	MPC · JPL
165724	2001 QC_{101}	—	August 20, 2001	Palomar	NEAT	EOS	3.5 km	MPC · JPL
165725	2001 QJ_{101}	—	August 18, 2001	Socorro	LINEAR	HYG	5.2 km	MPC · JPL
165726	2001 QC_{106}	—	August 18, 2001	Anderson Mesa	LONEOS	·	5.3 km	MPC · JPL
165727	2001 QG_{106}	—	August 18, 2001	Anderson Mesa	LONEOS	TIR	5.9 km	MPC · JPL
165728	2001 QV_{106}	—	August 22, 2001	Socorro	LINEAR	·	5.1 km	MPC · JPL
165729	2001 QW_{106}	—	August 22, 2001	Socorro	LINEAR	·	7.2 km	MPC · JPL
165730	2001 QP_{124}	—	August 19, 2001	Socorro	LINEAR	EOS	3.4 km	MPC · JPL
165731	2001 QA_{125}	—	August 19, 2001	Socorro	LINEAR	THM	6.0 km	MPC · JPL
165732	2001 QU_{126}	—	August 20, 2001	Socorro	LINEAR	·	6.1 km	MPC · JPL
165733	2001 QE_{127}	—	August 20, 2001	Socorro	LINEAR	·	5.0 km	MPC · JPL
165734	2001 QC_{128}	—	August 20, 2001	Socorro	LINEAR	·	4.4 km	MPC · JPL
165735	2001 QQ_{128}	—	August 20, 2001	Socorro	LINEAR	·	4.9 km	MPC · JPL
165736	2001 QQ_{131}	—	August 20, 2001	Socorro	LINEAR	·	5.8 km	MPC · JPL
165737	2001 QE_{134}	—	August 21, 2001	Socorro	LINEAR	·	5.1 km	MPC · JPL
165738	2001 QT_{154}	—	August 23, 2001	Anderson Mesa	LONEOS	EOS	3.0 km	MPC · JPL
165739	2001 QQ_{158}	—	August 23, 2001	Anderson Mesa	LONEOS	·	5.7 km	MPC · JPL
165740	2001 QH_{161}	—	August 23, 2001	Anderson Mesa	LONEOS	EOS	3.6 km	MPC · JPL
165741	2001 QS_{161}	—	August 23, 2001	Anderson Mesa	LONEOS	URS	5.9 km	MPC · JPL
165742	2001 QO_{162}	—	August 23, 2001	Anderson Mesa	LONEOS	EOS	3.9 km	MPC · JPL
165743	2001 QS_{164}	—	August 22, 2001	Haleakala	NEAT	TIR	4.1 km	MPC · JPL
165744	2001 QG_{167}	—	August 24, 2001	Haleakala	NEAT	·	5.5 km	MPC · JPL
165745	2001 QV_{168}	—	August 26, 2001	Haleakala	NEAT	·	4.9 km	MPC · JPL
165746	2001 QH_{171}	—	August 25, 2001	Socorro	LINEAR	EOS	5.1 km	MPC · JPL
165747	2001 QT_{184}	—	August 21, 2001	Socorro	LINEAR	·	5.3 km	MPC · JPL
165748	2001 QR_{186}	—	August 21, 2001	Kitt Peak	Spacewatch	·	6.3 km	MPC · JPL
165749	2001 QT_{187}	—	August 21, 2001	Haleakala	NEAT	·	7.9 km	MPC · JPL
165750	2001 QO_{189}	—	August 22, 2001	Socorro	LINEAR	·	10 km	MPC · JPL
165751	2001 QA_{191}	—	August 22, 2001	Socorro	LINEAR	H	960 m	MPC · JPL
165752	2001 QF_{202}	—	August 23, 2001	Anderson Mesa	LONEOS	·	8.0 km	MPC · JPL
165753	2001 QM_{202}	—	August 23, 2001	Anderson Mesa	LONEOS	EOS	3.7 km	MPC · JPL
165754	2001 QZ_{202}	—	August 23, 2001	Anderson Mesa	LONEOS	·	6.0 km	MPC · JPL
165755	2001 QK_{207}	—	August 23, 2001	Anderson Mesa	LONEOS	·	3.7 km	MPC · JPL
165756	2001 QT_{208}	—	August 23, 2001	Anderson Mesa	LONEOS	·	4.2 km	MPC · JPL
165757	2001 QV_{209}	—	August 23, 2001	Anderson Mesa	LONEOS	·	4.1 km	MPC · JPL
165758	2001 QR_{217}	—	August 23, 2001	Anderson Mesa	LONEOS	EOS	3.3 km	MPC · JPL
165759	2001 QU_{227}	—	August 24, 2001	Anderson Mesa	LONEOS	·	6.0 km	MPC · JPL
165760	2001 QA_{228}	—	August 24, 2001	Anderson Mesa	LONEOS	·	4.5 km	MPC · JPL
165761	2001 QD_{228}	—	August 24, 2001	Anderson Mesa	LONEOS	·	7.9 km	MPC · JPL
165762	2001 QL_{228}	—	August 24, 2001	Anderson Mesa	LONEOS	·	4.5 km	MPC · JPL
165763	2001 QV_{229}	—	August 24, 2001	Anderson Mesa	LONEOS	·	5.4 km	MPC · JPL
165764	2001 QO_{232}	—	August 24, 2001	Socorro	LINEAR	·	5.2 km	MPC · JPL
165765	2001 QW_{236}	—	August 24, 2001	Socorro	LINEAR	·	1.4 km	MPC · JPL
165766	2001 QA_{241}	—	August 24, 2001	Socorro	LINEAR	·	4.7 km	MPC · JPL
165767	2001 QC_{241}	—	August 24, 2001	Socorro	LINEAR	(31811)	4.6 km	MPC · JPL
165768	2001 QO_{243}	—	August 24, 2001	Socorro	LINEAR	·	5.6 km	MPC · JPL
165769	2001 QJ_{244}	—	August 24, 2001	Socorro	LINEAR	EOS	3.6 km	MPC · JPL
165770	2001 QC_{250}	—	August 24, 2001	Haleakala	NEAT	·	6.1 km	MPC · JPL
165771	2001 QS_{250}	—	August 24, 2001	Haleakala	NEAT	·	7.6 km	MPC · JPL
165772	2001 QL_{251}	—	August 25, 2001	Socorro	LINEAR	·	5.6 km	MPC · JPL
165773	2001 QC_{255}	—	August 25, 2001	Anderson Mesa	LONEOS	·	6.6 km	MPC · JPL
165774	2001 QE_{255}	—	August 25, 2001	Socorro	LINEAR	EOS	3.0 km	MPC · JPL
165775	2001 QE_{262}	—	August 25, 2001	Socorro	LINEAR	·	4.3 km	MPC · JPL
165776	2001 QD_{265}	—	August 26, 2001	Socorro	LINEAR	·	3.8 km	MPC · JPL
165777	2001 QG_{265}	—	August 26, 2001	Anderson Mesa	LONEOS	·	5.4 km	MPC · JPL
165778	2001 QN_{266}	—	August 20, 2001	Socorro	LINEAR	EOS	3.8 km	MPC · JPL
165779	2001 QB_{268}	—	August 20, 2001	Socorro	LINEAR	EOS	3.5 km	MPC · JPL
165780	2001 QP_{279}	—	August 19, 2001	Socorro	LINEAR	·	7.4 km	MPC · JPL
165781	2001 QE_{283}	—	August 18, 2001	Palomar	NEAT	·	8.6 km	MPC · JPL
165782	2001 QO_{330}	—	August 27, 2001	Anderson Mesa	LONEOS	·	4.4 km	MPC · JPL
165783	2001 RQ_{1}	—	September 7, 2001	Socorro	LINEAR	EOS	3.2 km	MPC · JPL
165784	2001 RN_{5}	—	September 9, 2001	Desert Eagle	W. K. Y. Yeung	·	7.6 km	MPC · JPL
165785	2001 RT_{5}	—	September 9, 2001	Desert Eagle	W. K. Y. Yeung	·	6.2 km	MPC · JPL
165786	2001 RW_{5}	—	September 9, 2001	Desert Eagle	W. K. Y. Yeung	EOS	4.7 km	MPC · JPL
165787	2001 RU_{9}	—	September 10, 2001	Socorro	LINEAR	·	8.2 km	MPC · JPL
165788	2001 RV_{19}	—	September 7, 2001	Socorro	LINEAR	·	4.9 km	MPC · JPL
165789	2001 RZ_{20}	—	September 7, 2001	Socorro	LINEAR	·	4.1 km	MPC · JPL
165790	2001 RA_{28}	—	September 7, 2001	Socorro	LINEAR	EOS	2.9 km	MPC · JPL
165791	2001 RN_{29}	—	September 7, 2001	Socorro	LINEAR	·	4.1 km	MPC · JPL
165792	2001 RN_{33}	—	September 8, 2001	Socorro	LINEAR	·	3.6 km	MPC · JPL
165793	2001 RQ_{33}	—	September 8, 2001	Socorro	LINEAR	EOS	4.9 km	MPC · JPL
165794	2001 RX_{34}	—	September 8, 2001	Socorro	LINEAR	·	4.9 km	MPC · JPL
165795	2001 RG_{36}	—	September 8, 2001	Socorro	LINEAR	VER	4.1 km	MPC · JPL
165796	2001 RL_{36}	—	September 8, 2001	Socorro	LINEAR	·	4.0 km	MPC · JPL
165797	2001 RK_{37}	—	September 8, 2001	Socorro	LINEAR	·	3.4 km	MPC · JPL
165798	2001 RU_{41}	—	September 11, 2001	Socorro	LINEAR	·	5.6 km	MPC · JPL
165799	2001 RJ_{48}	—	September 11, 2001	Desert Eagle	W. K. Y. Yeung	VER	6.8 km	MPC · JPL
165800	2001 RJ_{50}	—	September 10, 2001	Socorro	LINEAR	·	5.2 km	MPC · JPL

== 165801–165900 ==
back to top

Designation			Discovery			Properties		Ref
Permanent	Provisional	Named after	Date	Site	Discoverer(s)	Category	Diam.	Ref
165801	2001 RO_{52}	—	September 12, 2001	Socorro	LINEAR	·	4.1 km	MPC · JPL
165802	2001 RN_{54}	—	September 12, 2001	Socorro	LINEAR	·	5.5 km	MPC · JPL
165803	2001 RN_{55}	—	September 12, 2001	Socorro	LINEAR	·	5.5 km	MPC · JPL
165804	2001 RZ_{57}	—	September 12, 2001	Socorro	LINEAR	·	6.8 km	MPC · JPL
165805	2001 RB_{58}	—	September 12, 2001	Socorro	LINEAR	·	6.1 km	MPC · JPL
165806	2001 RC_{60}	—	September 12, 2001	Socorro	LINEAR	·	4.5 km	MPC · JPL
165807	2001 RS_{62}	—	September 12, 2001	Socorro	LINEAR	·	5.8 km	MPC · JPL
165808	2001 RO_{66}	—	September 10, 2001	Socorro	LINEAR	·	6.0 km	MPC · JPL
165809	2001 RK_{78}	—	September 10, 2001	Socorro	LINEAR	·	8.3 km	MPC · JPL
165810	2001 RW_{79}	—	September 12, 2001	Socorro	LINEAR	·	4.4 km	MPC · JPL
165811	2001 RH_{81}	—	September 14, 2001	Palomar	NEAT	·	6.7 km	MPC · JPL
165812	2001 RE_{84}	—	September 11, 2001	Anderson Mesa	LONEOS	·	7.6 km	MPC · JPL
165813	2001 RJ_{87}	—	September 11, 2001	Anderson Mesa	LONEOS	HYG	5.2 km	MPC · JPL
165814	2001 RY_{96}	—	September 12, 2001	Kitt Peak	Spacewatch	·	5.0 km	MPC · JPL
165815	2001 RF_{100}	—	September 12, 2001	Socorro	LINEAR	·	5.9 km	MPC · JPL
165816	2001 RU_{100}	—	September 12, 2001	Socorro	LINEAR	EOS	3.4 km	MPC · JPL
165817	2001 RU_{101}	—	September 12, 2001	Socorro	LINEAR	·	5.6 km	MPC · JPL
165818	2001 RE_{102}	—	September 12, 2001	Socorro	LINEAR	HYG	4.1 km	MPC · JPL
165819	2001 RT_{108}	—	September 12, 2001	Socorro	LINEAR	·	4.2 km	MPC · JPL
165820	2001 RF_{111}	—	September 12, 2001	Socorro	LINEAR	·	2.9 km	MPC · JPL
165821	2001 RK_{112}	—	September 12, 2001	Socorro	LINEAR	·	4.5 km	MPC · JPL
165822	2001 RO_{112}	—	September 12, 2001	Socorro	LINEAR	·	6.1 km	MPC · JPL
165823	2001 RJ_{113}	—	September 12, 2001	Socorro	LINEAR	THM	4.3 km	MPC · JPL
165824	2001 RY_{114}	—	September 12, 2001	Socorro	LINEAR	·	5.6 km	MPC · JPL
165825	2001 RS_{117}	—	September 12, 2001	Socorro	LINEAR	KOR	2.7 km	MPC · JPL
165826	2001 RU_{117}	—	September 12, 2001	Socorro	LINEAR	·	2.8 km	MPC · JPL
165827	2001 RX_{118}	—	September 12, 2001	Socorro	LINEAR	·	5.4 km	MPC · JPL
165828	2001 RK_{123}	—	September 12, 2001	Socorro	LINEAR	HYG	5.8 km	MPC · JPL
165829	2001 RO_{127}	—	September 12, 2001	Socorro	LINEAR	·	4.5 km	MPC · JPL
165830	2001 RV_{128}	—	September 12, 2001	Socorro	LINEAR	THM	5.4 km	MPC · JPL
165831	2001 RD_{131}	—	September 12, 2001	Socorro	LINEAR	·	5.0 km	MPC · JPL
165832	2001 RH_{131}	—	September 12, 2001	Socorro	LINEAR	·	6.2 km	MPC · JPL
165833	2001 RY_{134}	—	September 12, 2001	Socorro	LINEAR	·	4.1 km	MPC · JPL
165834	2001 RW_{135}	—	September 12, 2001	Socorro	LINEAR	·	4.6 km	MPC · JPL
165835	2001 RD_{138}	—	September 12, 2001	Socorro	LINEAR	·	2.8 km	MPC · JPL
165836	2001 RJ_{140}	—	September 12, 2001	Socorro	LINEAR	slow	5.1 km	MPC · JPL
165837	2001 RO_{141}	—	September 12, 2001	Socorro	LINEAR	·	5.7 km	MPC · JPL
165838	2001 RA_{143}	—	September 15, 2001	Palomar	NEAT	·	5.5 km	MPC · JPL
165839	2001 RW_{144}	—	September 6, 2001	Palomar	NEAT	·	5.6 km	MPC · JPL
165840	2001 RQ_{146}	—	September 9, 2001	Anderson Mesa	LONEOS	·	6.9 km	MPC · JPL
165841	2001 RC_{147}	—	September 9, 2001	Anderson Mesa	LONEOS	·	6.2 km	MPC · JPL
165842	2001 RE_{153}	—	September 12, 2001	Socorro	LINEAR	·	6.2 km	MPC · JPL
165843	2001 RB_{154}	—	September 15, 2001	Palomar	NEAT	·	5.2 km	MPC · JPL
165844	2001 SB_{6}	—	September 18, 2001	Kitt Peak	Spacewatch	THM	3.4 km	MPC · JPL
165845	2001 SP_{10}	—	September 16, 2001	Socorro	LINEAR	·	5.3 km	MPC · JPL
165846	2001 SE_{11}	—	September 16, 2001	Socorro	LINEAR	EOS	3.4 km	MPC · JPL
165847	2001 SE_{12}	—	September 16, 2001	Socorro	LINEAR	THM	3.4 km	MPC · JPL
165848	2001 SV_{13}	—	September 16, 2001	Socorro	LINEAR	·	7.0 km	MPC · JPL
165849	2001 SD_{16}	—	September 16, 2001	Socorro	LINEAR	HYG	5.9 km	MPC · JPL
165850	2001 SK_{16}	—	September 16, 2001	Socorro	LINEAR	THM	3.8 km	MPC · JPL
165851	2001 SP_{18}	—	September 16, 2001	Socorro	LINEAR	HYG	5.0 km	MPC · JPL
165852	2001 SG_{19}	—	September 16, 2001	Socorro	LINEAR	·	6.8 km	MPC · JPL
165853	2001 SD_{20}	—	September 16, 2001	Socorro	LINEAR	·	5.0 km	MPC · JPL
165854	2001 SQ_{23}	—	September 16, 2001	Socorro	LINEAR	HYG	4.5 km	MPC · JPL
165855	2001 SH_{24}	—	September 16, 2001	Socorro	LINEAR	·	4.7 km	MPC · JPL
165856	2001 SP_{30}	—	September 16, 2001	Socorro	LINEAR	·	6.4 km	MPC · JPL
165857	2001 SF_{34}	—	September 16, 2001	Socorro	LINEAR	·	5.4 km	MPC · JPL
165858	2001 SX_{35}	—	September 16, 2001	Socorro	LINEAR	·	5.4 km	MPC · JPL
165859	2001 SD_{40}	—	September 16, 2001	Socorro	LINEAR	·	5.0 km	MPC · JPL
165860	2001 SB_{43}	—	September 16, 2001	Socorro	LINEAR	·	5.3 km	MPC · JPL
165861	2001 SM_{45}	—	September 16, 2001	Socorro	LINEAR	·	5.7 km	MPC · JPL
165862	2001 SF_{78}	—	September 19, 2001	Socorro	LINEAR	·	5.3 km	MPC · JPL
165863	2001 SF_{80}	—	September 20, 2001	Socorro	LINEAR	THB	6.3 km	MPC · JPL
165864	2001 SW_{86}	—	September 20, 2001	Socorro	LINEAR	VER	5.4 km	MPC · JPL
165865	2001 SK_{88}	—	September 20, 2001	Socorro	LINEAR	·	4.7 km	MPC · JPL
165866	2001 SL_{89}	—	September 20, 2001	Socorro	LINEAR	·	4.3 km	MPC · JPL
165867	2001 SQ_{91}	—	September 20, 2001	Socorro	LINEAR	·	4.5 km	MPC · JPL
165868	2001 SO_{95}	—	September 20, 2001	Socorro	LINEAR	HYG	5.1 km	MPC · JPL
165869	2001 ST_{101}	—	September 20, 2001	Socorro	LINEAR	·	6.4 km	MPC · JPL
165870	2001 SY_{121}	—	September 16, 2001	Socorro	LINEAR	(5651)	3.6 km	MPC · JPL
165871	2001 SE_{124}	—	September 16, 2001	Socorro	LINEAR	HYG	5.9 km	MPC · JPL
165872	2001 SW_{125}	—	September 16, 2001	Socorro	LINEAR	·	3.8 km	MPC · JPL
165873	2001 SK_{126}	—	September 16, 2001	Socorro	LINEAR	HYG	4.7 km	MPC · JPL
165874	2001 SP_{128}	—	September 16, 2001	Socorro	LINEAR	AGN	2.1 km	MPC · JPL
165875	2001 SK_{129}	—	September 16, 2001	Socorro	LINEAR	·	1.6 km	MPC · JPL
165876	2001 SZ_{129}	—	September 16, 2001	Socorro	LINEAR	·	4.9 km	MPC · JPL
165877	2001 SH_{137}	—	September 16, 2001	Socorro	LINEAR	·	8.1 km	MPC · JPL
165878	2001 SS_{137}	—	September 16, 2001	Socorro	LINEAR	EOS	3.1 km	MPC · JPL
165879	2001 SQ_{140}	—	September 16, 2001	Socorro	LINEAR	VER	5.9 km	MPC · JPL
165880	2001 SF_{143}	—	September 16, 2001	Socorro	LINEAR	·	4.5 km	MPC · JPL
165881	2001 SX_{153}	—	September 17, 2001	Socorro	LINEAR	·	5.3 km	MPC · JPL
165882	2001 SC_{154}	—	September 17, 2001	Socorro	LINEAR	LIX	6.6 km	MPC · JPL
165883	2001 ST_{164}	—	September 17, 2001	Socorro	LINEAR	·	6.4 km	MPC · JPL
165884	2001 SO_{165}	—	September 19, 2001	Socorro	LINEAR	·	4.1 km	MPC · JPL
165885	2001 SP_{165}	—	September 19, 2001	Socorro	LINEAR	·	6.1 km	MPC · JPL
165886	2001 SY_{184}	—	September 19, 2001	Socorro	LINEAR	THM	3.0 km	MPC · JPL
165887	2001 SH_{186}	—	September 19, 2001	Socorro	LINEAR	THM	2.8 km	MPC · JPL
165888	2001 SJ_{196}	—	September 19, 2001	Socorro	LINEAR	THM	3.4 km	MPC · JPL
165889	2001 SY_{197}	—	September 19, 2001	Socorro	LINEAR	EOS	3.5 km	MPC · JPL
165890	2001 SW_{198}	—	September 19, 2001	Socorro	LINEAR	·	4.0 km	MPC · JPL
165891	2001 SH_{199}	—	September 19, 2001	Socorro	LINEAR	·	4.8 km	MPC · JPL
165892	2001 SP_{199}	—	September 19, 2001	Socorro	LINEAR	·	3.4 km	MPC · JPL
165893	2001 SF_{201}	—	September 19, 2001	Socorro	LINEAR	·	5.1 km	MPC · JPL
165894	2001 SJ_{202}	—	September 19, 2001	Socorro	LINEAR	THM	3.3 km	MPC · JPL
165895	2001 SU_{217}	—	September 19, 2001	Socorro	LINEAR	VER	3.8 km	MPC · JPL
165896	2001 SZ_{223}	—	September 19, 2001	Socorro	LINEAR	VER	5.0 km	MPC · JPL
165897	2001 SA_{235}	—	September 19, 2001	Socorro	LINEAR	·	5.1 km	MPC · JPL
165898	2001 ST_{250}	—	September 19, 2001	Socorro	LINEAR	·	4.6 km	MPC · JPL
165899	2001 SA_{292}	—	September 23, 2001	Anderson Mesa	LONEOS	LUT	11 km	MPC · JPL
165900	2001 SB_{294}	—	September 19, 2001	Socorro	LINEAR	·	5.8 km	MPC · JPL

== 165901–166000 ==
back to top

Designation			Discovery			Properties		Ref
Permanent	Provisional	Named after	Date	Site	Discoverer(s)	Category	Diam.	Ref
165901	2001 SZ_{303}	—	September 20, 2001	Socorro	LINEAR	·	5.0 km	MPC · JPL
165902	2001 SQ_{307}	—	September 21, 2001	Socorro	LINEAR	URS	6.1 km	MPC · JPL
165903	2001 SS_{307}	—	September 21, 2001	Socorro	LINEAR	HYG	4.7 km	MPC · JPL
165904	2001 SJ_{311}	—	September 19, 2001	Socorro	LINEAR	·	5.0 km	MPC · JPL
165905	2001 ST_{314}	—	September 23, 2001	Socorro	LINEAR	HYG	5.3 km	MPC · JPL
165906	2001 SM_{323}	—	September 25, 2001	Socorro	LINEAR	TIR	4.2 km	MPC · JPL
165907	2001 SC_{329}	—	September 19, 2001	Socorro	LINEAR	·	3.8 km	MPC · JPL
165908	2001 SH_{334}	—	September 19, 2001	Palomar	NEAT	·	7.4 km	MPC · JPL
165909	2001 SN_{344}	—	September 23, 2001	Palomar	NEAT	·	4.1 km	MPC · JPL
165910	2001 TG_{5}	—	October 10, 2001	Palomar	NEAT	HYG	5.5 km	MPC · JPL
165911	2001 TD_{7}	—	October 10, 2001	Palomar	NEAT	·	8.7 km	MPC · JPL
165912	2001 TE_{7}	—	October 11, 2001	San Marcello	L. Tesi, M. Tombelli	T_{j} (2.99)	9.4 km	MPC · JPL
165913	2001 TF_{8}	—	October 9, 2001	Socorro	LINEAR	·	7.6 km	MPC · JPL
165914	2001 TE_{31}	—	October 14, 2001	Socorro	LINEAR	CYB	6.9 km	MPC · JPL
165915	2001 TK_{54}	—	October 14, 2001	Socorro	LINEAR	VER	6.1 km	MPC · JPL
165916	2001 TD_{55}	—	October 14, 2001	Socorro	LINEAR	·	4.5 km	MPC · JPL
165917	2001 TT_{64}	—	October 13, 2001	Socorro	LINEAR	·	7.6 km	MPC · JPL
165918	2001 TA_{122}	—	October 15, 2001	Socorro	LINEAR	LUT	8.2 km	MPC · JPL
165919	2001 TL_{125}	—	October 12, 2001	Haleakala	NEAT	·	5.9 km	MPC · JPL
165920	2001 TL_{129}	—	October 15, 2001	Kitt Peak	Spacewatch	·	4.0 km	MPC · JPL
165921	2001 TQ_{132}	—	October 12, 2001	Haleakala	NEAT	CYB	6.9 km	MPC · JPL
165922	2001 TK_{144}	—	October 10, 2001	Palomar	NEAT	·	4.2 km	MPC · JPL
165923	2001 TM_{144}	—	October 10, 2001	Palomar	NEAT	·	5.0 km	MPC · JPL
165924	2001 TG_{147}	—	October 10, 2001	Palomar	NEAT	·	5.8 km	MPC · JPL
165925	2001 TQ_{162}	—	October 11, 2001	Palomar	NEAT	·	4.9 km	MPC · JPL
165926	2001 TG_{164}	—	October 11, 2001	Palomar	NEAT	·	4.8 km	MPC · JPL
165927	2001 TA_{178}	—	October 14, 2001	Socorro	LINEAR	·	5.2 km	MPC · JPL
165928	2001 TS_{196}	—	October 15, 2001	Palomar	NEAT	CYB	9.5 km	MPC · JPL
165929	2001 TC_{211}	—	October 13, 2001	Palomar	NEAT	THB	7.5 km	MPC · JPL
165930	2001 TV_{211}	—	October 13, 2001	Kitt Peak	Spacewatch	·	5.4 km	MPC · JPL
165931	2001 TF_{212}	—	October 13, 2001	Palomar	NEAT	·	5.8 km	MPC · JPL
165932	2001 TB_{226}	—	October 14, 2001	Palomar	NEAT	·	7.2 km	MPC · JPL
165933	2001 UJ_{14}	—	October 24, 2001	Socorro	LINEAR	·	1.5 km	MPC · JPL
165934	2001 UY_{21}	—	October 17, 2001	Socorro	LINEAR	VER	5.9 km	MPC · JPL
165935	2001 UU_{22}	—	October 18, 2001	Socorro	LINEAR	·	4.4 km	MPC · JPL
165936	2001 UK_{30}	—	October 16, 2001	Socorro	LINEAR	(5931)	6.2 km	MPC · JPL
165937	2001 UV_{31}	—	October 16, 2001	Socorro	LINEAR	(895)	6.1 km	MPC · JPL
165938	2001 UP_{40}	—	October 17, 2001	Socorro	LINEAR	VER	5.0 km	MPC · JPL
165939	2001 UN_{98}	—	October 17, 2001	Socorro	LINEAR	CYB	5.4 km	MPC · JPL
165940	2001 UN_{103}	—	October 20, 2001	Socorro	LINEAR	T_{j} (2.99) · EUP	6.1 km	MPC · JPL
165941	2001 UK_{110}	—	October 21, 2001	Socorro	LINEAR	·	4.2 km	MPC · JPL
165942	2001 UB_{125}	—	October 22, 2001	Palomar	NEAT	·	4.6 km	MPC · JPL
165943	2001 UD_{147}	—	October 23, 2001	Socorro	LINEAR	·	4.2 km	MPC · JPL
165944	2001 UV_{155}	—	October 23, 2001	Socorro	LINEAR	·	6.5 km	MPC · JPL
165945	2001 UQ_{169}	—	October 20, 2001	Socorro	LINEAR	·	6.2 km	MPC · JPL
165946	2001 UL_{197}	—	October 19, 2001	Palomar	NEAT	·	4.4 km	MPC · JPL
165947	2001 VD_{117}	—	November 12, 2001	Socorro	LINEAR	·	1.4 km	MPC · JPL
165948	2001 VG_{126}	—	November 14, 2001	Kitt Peak	Spacewatch	·	950 m	MPC · JPL
165949	2001 WY_{1}	—	November 18, 2001	Socorro	LINEAR	T_{j} (2.93)	7.2 km	MPC · JPL
165950	2001 WG_{5}	—	November 21, 2001	Socorro	LINEAR	·	810 m	MPC · JPL
165951	2001 WK_{69}	—	November 20, 2001	Socorro	LINEAR	·	4.3 km	MPC · JPL
165952	2001 WN_{92}	—	November 21, 2001	Socorro	LINEAR	HYG	5.1 km	MPC · JPL
165953	2001 XT_{18}	—	December 9, 2001	Socorro	LINEAR	·	1.4 km	MPC · JPL
165954	2001 XP_{46}	—	December 9, 2001	Socorro	LINEAR	·	1.6 km	MPC · JPL
165955	2001 XO_{62}	—	December 14, 2001	Kitt Peak	Spacewatch	·	1.2 km	MPC · JPL
165956	2001 XM_{68}	—	December 10, 2001	Socorro	LINEAR	·	1.9 km	MPC · JPL
165957	2001 XT_{87}	—	December 13, 2001	Socorro	LINEAR	·	1.2 km	MPC · JPL
165958	2001 XR_{103}	—	December 14, 2001	Socorro	LINEAR	·	1.2 km	MPC · JPL
165959	2001 XK_{111}	—	December 11, 2001	Socorro	LINEAR	·	1.3 km	MPC · JPL
165960	2001 XR_{157}	—	December 14, 2001	Socorro	LINEAR	HYG	4.2 km	MPC · JPL
165961	2001 XV_{164}	—	December 14, 2001	Socorro	LINEAR	·	1.2 km	MPC · JPL
165962	2001 XM_{168}	—	December 14, 2001	Socorro	LINEAR	·	2.5 km	MPC · JPL
165963	2001 XS_{168}	—	December 14, 2001	Socorro	LINEAR	·	1.0 km	MPC · JPL
165964	2001 XT_{173}	—	December 14, 2001	Socorro	LINEAR	·	870 m	MPC · JPL
165965	2001 XT_{184}	—	December 14, 2001	Socorro	LINEAR	·	1.2 km	MPC · JPL
165966	2001 XP_{190}	—	December 14, 2001	Socorro	LINEAR	·	950 m	MPC · JPL
165967	2001 XN_{199}	—	December 14, 2001	Socorro	LINEAR	·	1.3 km	MPC · JPL
165968	2001 XB_{210}	—	December 11, 2001	Socorro	LINEAR	·	2.6 km	MPC · JPL
165969	2001 XN_{213}	—	December 11, 2001	Socorro	LINEAR	·	1.8 km	MPC · JPL
165970	2001 XH_{232}	—	December 15, 2001	Socorro	LINEAR	·	1.9 km	MPC · JPL
165971	2001 XL_{237}	—	December 15, 2001	Socorro	LINEAR	·	1.2 km	MPC · JPL
165972	2001 XE_{242}	—	December 14, 2001	Socorro	LINEAR	·	1.6 km	MPC · JPL
165973	2001 XT_{251}	—	December 14, 2001	Socorro	LINEAR	·	1.4 km	MPC · JPL
165974	2001 XP_{260}	—	December 10, 2001	Socorro	LINEAR	·	1.2 km	MPC · JPL
165975	2001 YH_{4}	—	December 23, 2001	Kitt Peak	Spacewatch	·	2.5 km	MPC · JPL
165976	2001 YP_{27}	—	December 18, 2001	Socorro	LINEAR	fast	1.4 km	MPC · JPL
165977	2001 YO_{31}	—	December 18, 2001	Socorro	LINEAR	·	970 m	MPC · JPL
165978	2001 YL_{85}	—	December 18, 2001	Socorro	LINEAR	·	970 m	MPC · JPL
165979	2001 YR_{88}	—	December 18, 2001	Socorro	LINEAR	·	1.5 km	MPC · JPL
165980	2001 YZ_{89}	—	December 18, 2001	Socorro	LINEAR	·	840 m	MPC · JPL
165981	2001 YR_{90}	—	December 18, 2001	Socorro	LINEAR	·	1.6 km	MPC · JPL
165982	2001 YM_{96}	—	December 18, 2001	Palomar	NEAT	·	3.6 km	MPC · JPL
165983	2001 YY_{99}	—	December 17, 2001	Socorro	LINEAR	·	990 m	MPC · JPL
165984	2001 YK_{109}	—	December 18, 2001	Socorro	LINEAR	·	1.8 km	MPC · JPL
165985	2001 YR_{114}	—	December 19, 2001	Palomar	NEAT	·	1.2 km	MPC · JPL
165986	2001 YZ_{116}	—	December 18, 2001	Socorro	LINEAR	·	1.3 km	MPC · JPL
165987	2001 YJ_{127}	—	December 17, 2001	Socorro	LINEAR	·	1.3 km	MPC · JPL
165988	2001 YQ_{138}	—	December 18, 2001	Kitt Peak	Spacewatch	·	1.2 km	MPC · JPL
165989	2001 YE_{139}	—	December 23, 2001	Kitt Peak	Spacewatch	·	1.2 km	MPC · JPL
165990	2001 YO_{148}	—	December 18, 2001	Socorro	LINEAR	·	850 m	MPC · JPL
165991	2001 YL_{149}	—	December 19, 2001	Palomar	NEAT	SYL · CYB	7.7 km	MPC · JPL
165992	2001 YY_{156}	—	December 17, 2001	Socorro	LINEAR	(2076)	1.5 km	MPC · JPL
165993	2002 AN_{6}	—	January 9, 2002	Oaxaca	Roe, J. M.	·	1.2 km	MPC · JPL
165994	2002 AO_{20}	—	January 6, 2002	Haleakala	NEAT	·	2.0 km	MPC · JPL
165995	2002 AS_{23}	—	January 5, 2002	Haleakala	NEAT	·	1.5 km	MPC · JPL
165996	2002 AH_{30}	—	January 9, 2002	Socorro	LINEAR	·	1.3 km	MPC · JPL
165997	2002 AP_{31}	—	January 9, 2002	Socorro	LINEAR	·	3.3 km	MPC · JPL
165998	2002 AH_{34}	—	January 12, 2002	Kitt Peak	Spacewatch	·	1.7 km	MPC · JPL
165999	2002 AR_{45}	—	January 9, 2002	Socorro	LINEAR	·	1.0 km	MPC · JPL
166000	2002 AO_{47}	—	January 9, 2002	Socorro	LINEAR	·	1.2 km	MPC · JPL

back to top

== See also ==
- Meanings of minor-planet names: 165001–166000
