= Meanings of minor-planet names: 165001–166000 =

As minor planet discoveries are confirmed, they are given a permanent number by the IAU's Minor Planet Center (MPC), and the discoverers can then submit names for them, following the IAU's naming conventions. The list below concerns those minor planets in the specified number-range that have received names, and explains the meanings of those names.

Official naming citations of newly named small Solar System bodies are approved and published in a bulletin by IAU's Working Group for Small Bodies Nomenclature (WGSBN). Before May 2021, citations were published in MPC's Minor Planet Circulars for many decades. Recent citations can also be found on the JPL Small-Body Database (SBDB). Until his death in 2016, German astronomer Lutz D. Schmadel compiled these citations into the Dictionary of Minor Planet Names (DMP) and regularly updated the collection.

Based on Paul Herget's The Names of the Minor Planets, Schmadel also researched the unclear origin of numerous asteroids, most of which had been named prior to World War II. This article incorporates text from this source, which is in the public domain: SBDB New namings may only be added to this list below after official publication as the preannouncement of names is condemned. The WGSBN publishes a comprehensive guideline for the naming rules of non-cometary small Solar System bodies.

== 165001–165100 ==
Named minor planet	Provisional	This minor planet was named for...	Ref · Catalog
165067 Pauls	2000 ED_{207}	A. Georg Pauls (born 1958), engineer with the Sloan Digital Sky Survey	JPL · 165067

== 165101–165200 ==
back to top

Named minor planet	Provisional	This minor planet was named for...	Ref · Catalog
165167 Kikkawatsuneie	2000 QY_{109}	Kikkawa Tsuneie, lord of Tottori Castle, who saved the lives of his retainers and local villagers at the cost of his own life at the siege of his castle. Tsuneie's descendants served as elder retainers of the Iwakuni clan, and this naming was done to commemorate the 30th anniversary of Tottori City and Iwakuni City becoming sister cities.	IAU · 165167
165192 Neugent	2000 QD_{235}	Kathryn F. Neugent (born 1987), research associate at Lowell Observatory and computer scientist at the National Renewable Energy Laboratory Src	JPL · 165192

== 165201–165300 ==
back to top

Named minor planet	Provisional	This minor planet was named for...	Ref · Catalog
There are no named minor planets in this number range

== 165301–165400 ==
back to top

Named minor planet	Provisional	This minor planet was named for...	Ref · Catalog
165347 Philplait	2000 WG_{11}	Phil Plait (born 1964), American astronomer, educator and author	JPL · 165347

== 165401–165500 ==
back to top

Named minor planet	Provisional	This minor planet was named for...	Ref · Catalog
There are no named minor planets in this number range

== 165501–165600 ==
back to top

Named minor planet	Provisional	This minor planet was named for...	Ref · Catalog
165574 Deidre	2001 DH_{105}	Deidre Ann Hunter (born 1953), astronomer at Lowell Observatory	JPL · 165574

== 165601–165700 ==
back to top

Named minor planet	Provisional	This minor planet was named for...	Ref · Catalog
165612 Stackpole	2001 FP_{86}	Michael Stackpole (born 1957), American science fiction author and science advocate	JPL · 165612
165659 Michaelhicks	2001 LZ_{6}	Michael D. Hicks (1964–2023), scientist at the Jet Propulsion Laboratory	JPL · 165659
165694 Calosisbaragli	2001 PQ_{28}	Adriana Calosi (1945–2024) and Michele Sbaragli (b. 1944), a married couple passionate about astronomy.	IAU · 165694

== 165701–165800 ==
back to top

Named minor planet	Provisional	This minor planet was named for...	Ref · Catalog
There are no named minor planets in this number range

== 165801–165900 ==
back to top

Named minor planet	Provisional	This minor planet was named for...	Ref · Catalog
There are no named minor planets in this number range

== 165901–166000 ==
back to top

Named minor planet	Provisional	This minor planet was named for...	Ref · Catalog
There are no named minor planets in this number range

back to top

Preceded by 164,001–165,000	Meanings of minor-planet names List of minor planets: 165,001–166,000	Succeeded by 166,001–167,000
