= Meanings of minor-planet names: 162001–163000 =

As minor planet discoveries are confirmed, they are given a permanent number by the IAU's Minor Planet Center (MPC), and the discoverers can then submit names for them, following the IAU's naming conventions. The list below concerns those minor planets in the specified number-range that have received names, and explains the meanings of those names.

Official naming citations of newly named small Solar System bodies are approved and published in a bulletin by IAU's Working Group for Small Bodies Nomenclature (WGSBN). Before May 2021, citations were published in MPC's Minor Planet Circulars for many decades. Recent citations can also be found on the JPL Small-Body Database (SBDB). Until his death in 2016, German astronomer Lutz D. Schmadel compiled these citations into the Dictionary of Minor Planet Names (DMP) and regularly updated the collection.

Based on Paul Herget's The Names of the Minor Planets, Schmadel also researched the unclear origin of numerous asteroids, most of which had been named prior to World War II. This article incorporates text from this source, which is in the public domain: SBDB New namings may only be added to this list below after official publication as the preannouncement of names is condemned. The WGSBN publishes a comprehensive guideline for the naming rules of non-cometary small Solar System bodies.

== 162001–162100 ==
Named minor planet	Provisional	This minor planet was named for...	Ref · Catalog
162001 Vulpius	1990 TH_{9}	Melchior Vulpius (c. 1570–1615), a German singer and composer of church music	JPL · 162001
162002 Spalatin	1990 TC_{10}	George Spalatin (1484–1545) was a German theologian, humanist and historian. In 1502 he went to the University of Wittenberg and had good relations with Martin Luther and to the Reformation. Spalatin was painted by Lukas Cranach, father and son. He died at Altenburg and was buried in the St. Batholomew church.	JPL · 162002
162011 Konnohmaru	1994 AB_{1}	Konnohmaru is a legendary warrior of the Heiji Rebellion (1159)	JPL · 162011
162035 Jirotakahashi	1995 YW_{1}	Jiro Takahashi (born 1949), professor of science education at Ehime University	JPL · 162035
162059 Mészáros	1997 AM_{17}	Attila Mészáros (1951–2022) was a Czech astronomer of Hungarian origin. He was a member of the Astronomical Institute of Charles University in Prague from 1984. Mészáros dealt with cosmology, the large-scale structure of the universe and γ-ray bursts.	IAU · 162059

== 162101–162200 ==
back to top

Named minor planet	Provisional	This minor planet was named for...	Ref · Catalog
162158 Merrillhess	1999 CZ_{9}	Merrill Hess (born 1955), an amateur astronomer and has been president and vice-president of the Baton Rouge Astronomical Society many times.	JPL · 162158
162166 Mantsch	1999 FW_{82}	Paul Mantsch (born 1941), American particle and astro-particle physicist with the Sloan Digital Sky Survey	JPL · 162166
162173 Ryugu	1999 JU_{3}	Ryūgū-jō (Ryugu), the undersea palace of the dragon deity Ryūjin in Japanese mythology, from where a Japanese fisherman brought back a box with a secret. The naming alludes to the Hayabusa2 asteroid sample return mission.	JPL · 162173

== 162201–162300 ==
back to top

Named minor planet	Provisional	This minor planet was named for...	Ref · Catalog
There are no named minor planets in this number range

== 162301–162400 ==
back to top

Named minor planet	Provisional	This minor planet was named for...	Ref · Catalog
162395 Michaelbird	2000 CY_{108}	Michael K. Bird (b. 1944), a German planetary scientist.	IAU · 162395

== 162401–162500 ==
back to top

Named minor planet	Provisional	This minor planet was named for...	Ref · Catalog
162466 Margon	2000 JA_{90}	Bruce Margon (born 1948), American astronomer and a contributor to the Sloan Digital Sky Survey	JPL · 162466
162500 Silvanodelbo'	2000 QE_{38}	Silvano Delbo’, Italian mechanic and the father of planetary scientist M. Delbó.	IAU · 162500

== 162501–162600 ==
back to top

Named minor planet	Provisional	This minor planet was named for...	Ref · Catalog
There are no named minor planets in this number range

== 162601–162700 ==
back to top

Named minor planet	Provisional	This minor planet was named for...	Ref · Catalog
There are no named minor planets in this number range

== 162701–162800 ==
back to top

Named minor planet	Provisional	This minor planet was named for...	Ref · Catalog
162755 Spacesora	2000 WA_{68}	"Space Sora", the non-profit organization who has contributed to the popularization of science, especially astronomy, among children in Ehime prefecture, Japan, since 2008	JPL · 162755

== 162801–162900 ==
back to top

Named minor planet	Provisional	This minor planet was named for...	Ref · Catalog
There are no named minor planets in this number range

== 162901–163000 ==
back to top

Named minor planet	Provisional	This minor planet was named for...	Ref · Catalog
162937 Prêtre	2001 PQ_{9}	René Prêtre (born 1957), a Swiss heart surgeon who treats children in both Switzerland and Mozambique. He was voted Swiss of the Year in 2009.	JPL · 162937
162978 Helenhart	2001 QD_{333}	Helen M. Hart (born 1954), a mission operations analyst at the Applied Physics Laboratory, worked as a Mission Sequencer for the New Horizons mission to Pluto.	JPL · 162978

back to top

Preceded by 161,001–162,000	Meanings of minor-planet names List of minor planets: 162,001–163,000	Succeeded by 163,001–164,000
