= René Prêtre =

Swiss surgeon (born 1957)

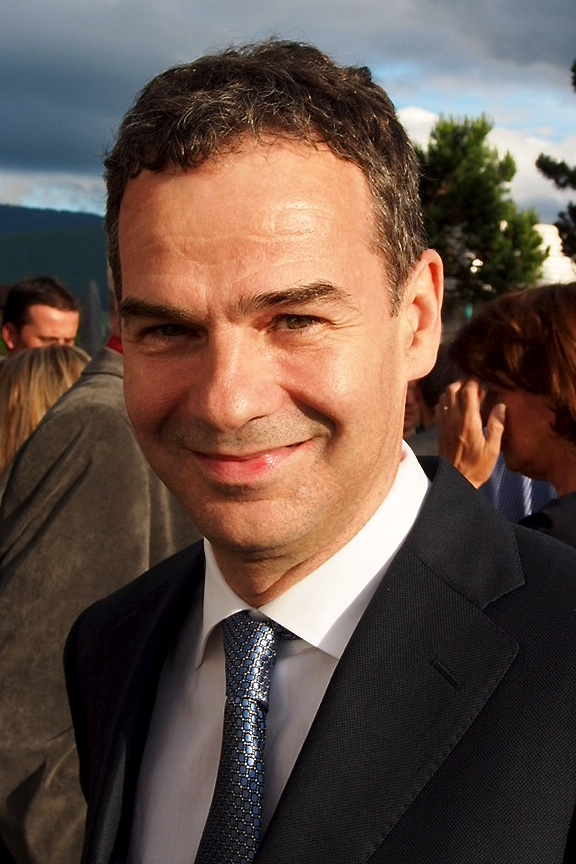
- Prêtre in 2012
- Born: 1957 (age 68–69); Boncourt, Jura, Switzerland
- Citizenship: Swiss
- Education: University of Geneva
- Medical career
- Profession: Surgeon
- Institutions: University Hospital of Zurich, University Hospital of Lausanne
- Sub-specialties: Children's heart surgery
- Awards: 2009 Swiss of the Year

René Prêtre (born 1957) is a Swiss pediatric heart surgeon at the University Hospital of Lausanne. He has performed thousands of surgeries on children's hearts.

== Early life and education ==
Prêtre was born into a family of farmers in the countryside of Canton Jura, as one of seven siblings. His father was a farmer and a Jurassian independence activist who was summoned five times before a judge. Prêtre learned to work with his hands and to repair farm machinery. His grandfather was a watchmaker.

Prêtre initially wanted to become a farmer or a football player, but applied for a position in medical school after a colleague from high school suggested it to him and told him the deadline for applying was approaching. In 1988 he graduated from the University of Geneva in general surgery. Between 1988 and 1990 he followed up on his studies at New York University, where he specialized in cardiovascular surgery. He completed his formation in cardiovascular surgery at the University of Geneva in 1994, and became a lecturer at the university the same year.

== Professional career ==
As a student at New York University in the late 1980s, Prêtre was a surgeon at Bellevue Hospital in New York. After his graduation in 1994, he became a surgeon at the Great Ormond Street Hospital in London. In 1997 he joined the University Hospital in Zurich and by 2002 he was hired as Professor for pediatric cardiovascular surgery at the University of Zurich. Since, he performed cardiovascular surgeries also at the Children's Hospital of Zurich. In 2011, it was reported that he would leave the University Hospital of Zurich and be hired as the head of the cardiovascular division at the University Hospital of Lausanne in August 2012. The same month he was appointed as a professor at the University of Lausanne. As in 2015 the Romand University Centre for Cardiology and Children's Heart Surgery (CURCCCP) was created, he became its coordinator for children's heart surgery. Through the CURCCCP, he was appointed as a professor at the University of Geneva in 2016.

=== Surgery ===
Before specializing in heart surgeries, Prêtre performed surgeries on victims of gunshots and stabbings at Bellevue Hospital in New York. There, Prêtre and his team would listen to "She Drives Me Crazy" by the Fine Young Cannibals, which according to him had a good rhythm for surgical work. Throughout his career Prêtre has performed surgeries on about 9,000 hearts of which around 6,000 were children's hearts. When operating, he wears glasses with a five-fold magnification to improve his eyesight. Some of the surgeries can last up to fourteen hours, during which he drinks very little fluid in order to be able to stay in the operation room. Through his NGO Le Petit Coeur he annually travels for a few weeks to Mozambique and Cambodia to perform heart surgeries.

== Personal life ==
Prêtre is a fan of the French football club FC Sochaux and played football in the Swiss regional league during his studies. He currently avoids drinking more than one glass of wine. Prêtre was married and has two daughters.

== Recognition ==
2009 Swiss of the Year

2020 Prix des Arts, des Lettres et des Sciences of the Canton of Jura

The planet 162937 Prêtre is named after him.

== Book ==
2016 memoir, Et au centre bat le coeur: chroniques d'un chirurgien cardiaque pédiatrique
