= List of minor planets: 162001–163000 =

The following is a partial list of minor planets, running from minor-planet number 162001 through 163000, inclusive. The primary data for this and other partial lists is based on JPL's "Small-Body Orbital Elements" and data available from the Minor Planet Center. Critical list information is also provided by the MPC, unless otherwise specified from Lowell Observatory. A detailed description of the table's columns and additional sources are given on the main page including a complete list of every page in this series, and a statistical break-up on the dynamical classification of minor planets.

Also see the summary list of all named bodies in numerical and alphabetical order, and the corresponding naming citations for the number range of this particular list. New namings may only be added to this list after official publication, as the preannouncement of names is condemned by the Working Group for Small Bodies Nomenclature of the International Astronomical Union.

Near-Earth obj.	MBA (inner)	MBA (outer)	Centaur
Mars-crosser	MBA (middle)	Jupiter trojan	Trans-Neptunian obj.
Unclassified

== 162001–162100 ==
Designation			Discovery			Properties		Ref
Permanent	Provisional	Named after	Date	Site	Discoverer(s)	Category	Diam.	Ref
162001 Vulpius	1990 TH_{9}	Vulpius	October 10, 1990	Tautenburg Observatory	F. Börngen, L. D. Schmadel	·	2.4 km	MPC · JPL
162002 Spalatin	1990 TC_{10}	Spalatin	October 10, 1990	Tautenburg Observatory	F. Börngen, L. D. Schmadel	·	1.8 km	MPC · JPL
162003	1991 TG	—	October 1, 1991	Siding Spring	R. H. McNaught	·	4.2 km	MPC · JPL
162004	1991 VE	—	November 3, 1991	Palomar	E. F. Helin, K. J. Lawrence	ATE +1km	780 m	MPC · JPL
162005	1992 SV_{9}	—	September 27, 1992	Kitt Peak	Spacewatch	MAS	1.3 km	MPC · JPL
162006	1993 FU_{16}	—	March 19, 1993	La Silla	UESAC	THM	3.8 km	MPC · JPL
162007	1993 FC_{32}	—	March 19, 1993	La Silla	UESAC	EUN	2.3 km	MPC · JPL
162008	1993 TW_{3}	—	October 8, 1993	Kitt Peak	Spacewatch	·	1.5 km	MPC · JPL
162009	1993 TE_{19}	—	October 9, 1993	La Silla	E. W. Elst	(2076)	1.4 km	MPC · JPL
162010	1993 UN_{6}	—	October 20, 1993	La Silla	E. W. Elst	·	1.4 km	MPC · JPL
162011 Konnohmaru	1994 AB_{1}	Konnohmaru	January 4, 1994	Yatsugatake	Y. Kushida, O. Muramatsu	AMO +1km	1.7 km	MPC · JPL
162012	1994 PY_{16}	—	August 10, 1994	La Silla	E. W. Elst	·	2.2 km	MPC · JPL
162013	1994 PC_{17}	—	August 10, 1994	La Silla	E. W. Elst	·	2.6 km	MPC · JPL
162014	1994 RF_{11}	—	September 11, 1994	Siding Spring	R. H. McNaught	H	1 km	MPC · JPL
162015	1994 TF_{2}	—	October 5, 1994	Siding Spring	R. H. McNaught	ATE	500 m	MPC · JPL
162016	1994 TC_{12}	—	October 10, 1994	Kitt Peak	Spacewatch	(12739)	2.4 km	MPC · JPL
162017	1994 UB_{11}	—	October 30, 1994	Kitt Peak	Spacewatch	·	1.1 km	MPC · JPL
162018	1995 BD_{8}	—	January 29, 1995	Kitt Peak	Spacewatch	·	2.5 km	MPC · JPL
162019	1995 DZ_{4}	—	February 21, 1995	Kitt Peak	Spacewatch	·	1.0 km	MPC · JPL
162020	1995 DK_{7}	—	February 24, 1995	Kitt Peak	Spacewatch	·	3.5 km	MPC · JPL
162021	1995 FV_{11}	—	March 27, 1995	Kitt Peak	Spacewatch	·	2.5 km	MPC · JPL
162022	1995 FJ_{14}	—	March 27, 1995	Kitt Peak	Spacewatch	·	2.6 km	MPC · JPL
162023	1995 GP_{8}	—	April 8, 1995	Kitt Peak	T. J. Balonek	·	1.4 km	MPC · JPL
162024	1995 SK_{16}	—	September 18, 1995	Kitt Peak	Spacewatch	·	1.6 km	MPC · JPL
162025	1995 SM_{25}	—	September 19, 1995	Kitt Peak	Spacewatch	·	1.6 km	MPC · JPL
162026	1995 SJ_{58}	—	September 22, 1995	Kitt Peak	Spacewatch	·	1.5 km	MPC · JPL
162027	1995 UN_{10}	—	October 17, 1995	Kitt Peak	Spacewatch	(5)	1.8 km	MPC · JPL
162028	1995 UU_{55}	—	October 23, 1995	Kitt Peak	Spacewatch	·	1.6 km	MPC · JPL
162029	1995 UP_{77}	—	October 22, 1995	Kitt Peak	Spacewatch	·	2.7 km	MPC · JPL
162030	1995 VK_{12}	—	November 15, 1995	Kitt Peak	Spacewatch	·	1.4 km	MPC · JPL
162031	1995 VE_{14}	—	November 15, 1995	Kitt Peak	Spacewatch	·	1.7 km	MPC · JPL
162032	1995 WJ_{8}	—	November 20, 1995	Haleakala	AMOS	·	2.0 km	MPC · JPL
162033	1995 WR_{37}	—	November 22, 1995	Kitt Peak	Spacewatch	·	4.3 km	MPC · JPL
162034	1995 XT_{1}	—	December 15, 1995	Oohira	T. Urata	(5)	2.6 km	MPC · JPL
162035 Jirotakahashi	1995 YW_{1}	Jirotakahashi	December 17, 1995	Kuma Kogen	A. Nakamura	·	2.6 km	MPC · JPL
162036	1996 AZ_{16}	—	January 13, 1996	Kitt Peak	Spacewatch	·	2.1 km	MPC · JPL
162037	1996 BW_{3}	—	January 26, 1996	Siding Spring	G. J. Garradd	·	920 m	MPC · JPL
162038	1996 DH	—	February 18, 1996	Kitt Peak	Spacewatch	AMO +1km	2.0 km	MPC · JPL
162039	1996 JG	—	May 8, 1996	Siding Spring	R. H. McNaught	APO · PHA	580 m	MPC · JPL
162040	1996 KF_{4}	—	May 22, 1996	La Silla	E. W. Elst	·	1.4 km	MPC · JPL
162041	1996 NL_{4}	—	July 14, 1996	La Silla	E. W. Elst	·	3.3 km	MPC · JPL
162042	1996 OR	—	July 22, 1996	Prescott	P. G. Comba	·	3.1 km	MPC · JPL
162043	1996 PP_{7}	—	August 8, 1996	La Silla	E. W. Elst	·	6.4 km	MPC · JPL
162044	1996 RP_{3}	—	September 13, 1996	Haleakala	NEAT	EOS	3.8 km	MPC · JPL
162045	1996 RM_{16}	—	September 13, 1996	Kitt Peak	Spacewatch	·	1.8 km	MPC · JPL
162046	1996 RQ_{31}	—	September 13, 1996	La Silla	Uppsala-DLR Trojan Survey	L4	10 km	MPC · JPL
162047	1996 RJ_{32}	—	September 14, 1996	La Silla	Uppsala-DLR Trojan Survey	L4	13 km	MPC · JPL
162048	1996 RO_{32}	—	September 14, 1996	La Silla	Uppsala-DLR Trojan Survey	L4	9.9 km	MPC · JPL
162049	1996 SZ_{7}	—	September 21, 1996	Xinglong	SCAP	·	5.8 km	MPC · JPL
162050	1996 SD_{8}	—	September 21, 1996	Xinglong	SCAP	·	5.2 km	MPC · JPL
162051	1996 TE_{1}	—	October 5, 1996	Prescott	P. G. Comba	·	2.9 km	MPC · JPL
162052	1996 TB_{10}	—	October 15, 1996	Sudbury	D. di Cicco	NYS	2.0 km	MPC · JPL
162053	1996 TL_{27}	—	October 7, 1996	Kitt Peak	Spacewatch	·	4.6 km	MPC · JPL
162054	1996 TF_{42}	—	October 8, 1996	La Silla	E. W. Elst	NYS	1.9 km	MPC · JPL
162055	1996 VA_{3}	—	November 10, 1996	Needville	Needville	MAS	1.0 km	MPC · JPL
162056	1996 XM_{4}	—	December 6, 1996	Kitt Peak	Spacewatch	·	2.0 km	MPC · JPL
162057	1996 XN_{28}	—	December 12, 1996	Kitt Peak	Spacewatch	THM	4.0 km	MPC · JPL
162058	1997 AE_{12}	—	January 10, 1997	Kitt Peak	Spacewatch	AMO +1km · slow	850 m	MPC · JPL
162059 Mészáros	1997 AM_{17}	Mészáros	January 13, 1997	Kleť	Kleť	·	5.7 km	MPC · JPL
162060	1997 CF_{2}	—	February 2, 1997	Kitt Peak	Spacewatch	·	2.3 km	MPC · JPL
162061	1997 CH_{22}	—	February 13, 1997	Prescott	P. G. Comba	·	2.7 km	MPC · JPL
162062	1997 EQ_{16}	—	March 5, 1997	Kitt Peak	Spacewatch	·	3.8 km	MPC · JPL
162063	1997 EH_{29}	—	March 7, 1997	Kitt Peak	Spacewatch	APO	570 m	MPC · JPL
162064	1997 GT_{4}	—	April 7, 1997	Kitt Peak	Spacewatch	·	2.6 km	MPC · JPL
162065	1997 KB_{3}	—	May 30, 1997	Kitt Peak	Spacewatch	·	1.2 km	MPC · JPL
162066	1997 MU_{8}	—	June 29, 1997	Kitt Peak	Spacewatch	·	3.3 km	MPC · JPL
162067	1997 NH_{2}	—	July 3, 1997	Kitt Peak	Spacewatch	·	2.6 km	MPC · JPL
162068	1997 SD_{29}	—	September 29, 1997	Kitt Peak	Spacewatch	·	5.9 km	MPC · JPL
162069	1997 TC_{3}	—	October 3, 1997	Caussols	ODAS	·	2.7 km	MPC · JPL
162070	1997 TQ_{5}	—	October 2, 1997	Caussols	ODAS	·	1.2 km	MPC · JPL
162071	1997 TL_{15}	—	October 4, 1997	Kitt Peak	Spacewatch	·	2.5 km	MPC · JPL
162072	1997 TT_{17}	—	October 6, 1997	Kitami	K. Endate, K. Watanabe	·	1.9 km	MPC · JPL
162073	1997 UK_{18}	—	October 28, 1997	Kitt Peak	Spacewatch	·	1.6 km	MPC · JPL
162074	1997 VX_{2}	—	November 5, 1997	Ondřejov	P. Pravec	·	3.7 km	MPC · JPL
162075	1997 WG_{5}	—	November 23, 1997	Kitt Peak	Spacewatch	·	4.4 km	MPC · JPL
162076	1997 WV_{8}	—	November 20, 1997	Kitt Peak	Spacewatch	·	4.0 km	MPC · JPL
162077	1997 WG_{11}	—	November 22, 1997	Kitt Peak	Spacewatch	·	3.3 km	MPC · JPL
162078	1997 WS_{24}	—	November 28, 1997	Kitt Peak	Spacewatch	·	1.3 km	MPC · JPL
162079	1997 WE_{35}	—	November 29, 1997	Socorro	LINEAR	·	4.0 km	MPC · JPL
162080	1998 DG_{16}	—	February 27, 1998	Haleakala	NEAT	ATE	780 m	MPC · JPL
162081	1998 FL_{123}	—	March 20, 1998	Socorro	LINEAR	NYS	1.9 km	MPC · JPL
162082	1998 HL_{1}	—	April 18, 1998	Socorro	LINEAR	AMO · APO · PHA	530 m	MPC · JPL
162083	1998 HM_{25}	—	April 18, 1998	Kitt Peak	Spacewatch	NYS	2.0 km	MPC · JPL
162084	1998 HB_{101}	—	April 21, 1998	Socorro	LINEAR	·	3.5 km	MPC · JPL
162085	1998 HR_{127}	—	April 18, 1998	Socorro	LINEAR	·	2.4 km	MPC · JPL
162086	1998 KT_{42}	—	May 27, 1998	Kitt Peak	Spacewatch	·	2.2 km	MPC · JPL
162087	1998 KY_{63}	—	May 22, 1998	Socorro	LINEAR	·	2.5 km	MPC · JPL
162088	1998 OV_{1}	—	July 24, 1998	Needville	D. Borgman, K. Rivich	·	2.1 km	MPC · JPL
162089	1998 OL_{13}	—	July 26, 1998	La Silla	E. W. Elst	MRX	2.0 km	MPC · JPL
162090	1998 PP	—	August 15, 1998	Prescott	P. G. Comba	EUN	2.2 km	MPC · JPL
162091	1998 QQ_{3}	—	August 17, 1998	Socorro	LINEAR	·	6.5 km	MPC · JPL
162092	1998 QA_{4}	—	August 17, 1998	Reedy Creek	J. Broughton	·	3.0 km	MPC · JPL
162093	1998 QV_{10}	—	August 17, 1998	Socorro	LINEAR	·	3.4 km	MPC · JPL
162094	1998 QS_{24}	—	August 17, 1998	Socorro	LINEAR	·	2.6 km	MPC · JPL
162095	1998 QC_{29}	—	August 25, 1998	Ondřejov	L. Kotková	·	2.9 km	MPC · JPL
162096	1998 QD_{30}	—	August 26, 1998	Xinglong	SCAP	·	3.5 km	MPC · JPL
162097	1998 QF_{30}	—	August 26, 1998	Xinglong	SCAP	·	3.3 km	MPC · JPL
162098	1998 QQ_{34}	—	August 17, 1998	Socorro	LINEAR	·	4.2 km	MPC · JPL
162099	1998 QV_{41}	—	August 17, 1998	Socorro	LINEAR	·	4.0 km	MPC · JPL
162100	1998 QD_{67}	—	August 24, 1998	Socorro	LINEAR	·	3.9 km	MPC · JPL

== 162101–162200 ==
back to top

Designation			Discovery			Properties		Ref
Permanent	Provisional	Named after	Date	Site	Discoverer(s)	Category	Diam.	Ref
162101	1998 QR_{85}	—	August 24, 1998	Socorro	LINEAR	·	2.8 km	MPC · JPL
162102	1998 QV_{95}	—	August 19, 1998	Socorro	LINEAR	·	4.0 km	MPC · JPL
162103	1998 RS_{1}	—	September 14, 1998	Catalina	CSS	GEF	1.9 km	MPC · JPL
162104	1998 RM_{7}	—	September 12, 1998	Kitt Peak	Spacewatch	(12739)	2.4 km	MPC · JPL
162105	1998 RZ_{22}	—	September 14, 1998	Socorro	LINEAR	·	3.2 km	MPC · JPL
162106	1998 RE_{23}	—	September 14, 1998	Socorro	LINEAR	·	4.3 km	MPC · JPL
162107	1998 RQ_{26}	—	September 14, 1998	Socorro	LINEAR	·	4.3 km	MPC · JPL
162108	1998 RH_{36}	—	September 14, 1998	Socorro	LINEAR	·	2.8 km	MPC · JPL
162109	1998 RE_{39}	—	September 14, 1998	Socorro	LINEAR	·	3.1 km	MPC · JPL
162110	1998 RQ_{63}	—	September 14, 1998	Socorro	LINEAR	·	3.6 km	MPC · JPL
162111	1998 RT_{76}	—	September 14, 1998	Socorro	LINEAR	·	5.7 km	MPC · JPL
162112	1998 RH_{79}	—	September 14, 1998	Socorro	LINEAR	·	3.7 km	MPC · JPL
162113	1998 RE_{80}	—	September 14, 1998	Socorro	LINEAR	·	4.3 km	MPC · JPL
162114	1998 SP_{9}	—	September 17, 1998	Xinglong	SCAP	·	2.7 km	MPC · JPL
162115	1998 SP_{10}	—	September 19, 1998	Reedy Creek	J. Broughton	·	4.3 km	MPC · JPL
162116	1998 SA_{15}	—	September 21, 1998	Socorro	LINEAR	APO · PHA	540 m	MPC · JPL
162117	1998 SD_{15}	—	September 23, 1998	Socorro	LINEAR	ATE	550 m	MPC · JPL
162118	1998 SP_{19}	—	September 20, 1998	Kitt Peak	Spacewatch	·	3.7 km	MPC · JPL
162119	1998 SV_{34}	—	September 26, 1998	Socorro	LINEAR	TIN	5.1 km	MPC · JPL
162120	1998 SH_{36}	—	September 27, 1998	Socorro	LINEAR	APO · PHA	260 m	MPC · JPL
162121	1998 SD_{61}	—	September 17, 1998	Anderson Mesa	LONEOS	EUN	2.7 km	MPC · JPL
162122	1998 SH_{63}	—	September 26, 1998	Xinglong	SCAP	·	3.6 km	MPC · JPL
162123	1998 SW_{67}	—	September 19, 1998	Socorro	LINEAR	ADE	3.6 km	MPC · JPL
162124	1998 SC_{69}	—	September 19, 1998	Socorro	LINEAR	·	3.7 km	MPC · JPL
162125	1998 SC_{81}	—	September 26, 1998	Socorro	LINEAR	(21344)	3.2 km	MPC · JPL
162126	1998 SX_{83}	—	September 26, 1998	Socorro	LINEAR	·	3.6 km	MPC · JPL
162127	1998 SO_{85}	—	September 26, 1998	Socorro	LINEAR	JUN	2.2 km	MPC · JPL
162128	1998 SL_{87}	—	September 26, 1998	Socorro	LINEAR	·	3.5 km	MPC · JPL
162129	1998 SZ_{91}	—	September 26, 1998	Socorro	LINEAR	·	4.1 km	MPC · JPL
162130	1998 SP_{104}	—	September 26, 1998	Socorro	LINEAR	·	2.9 km	MPC · JPL
162131	1998 SL_{127}	—	September 26, 1998	Socorro	LINEAR	·	4.9 km	MPC · JPL
162132	1998 SA_{162}	—	September 26, 1998	Socorro	LINEAR	GEF ·	4.1 km	MPC · JPL
162133	1998 SH_{163}	—	September 26, 1998	Socorro	LINEAR	·	4.9 km	MPC · JPL
162134	1998 TJ_{24}	—	October 14, 1998	Kitt Peak	Spacewatch	·	1.0 km	MPC · JPL
162135	1998 TE_{38}	—	October 3, 1998	Anderson Mesa	LONEOS	·	5.2 km	MPC · JPL
162136	1998 UD_{5}	—	October 22, 1998	Caussols	ODAS	·	2.9 km	MPC · JPL
162137	1998 UJ_{10}	—	October 16, 1998	Kitt Peak	Spacewatch	MRX	1.8 km	MPC · JPL
162138	1998 UY_{13}	—	October 23, 1998	Kitt Peak	Spacewatch	·	3.1 km	MPC · JPL
162139	1998 UL_{19}	—	October 28, 1998	Socorro	LINEAR	·	3.9 km	MPC · JPL
162140	1998 UX_{28}	—	October 18, 1998	La Silla	E. W. Elst	·	3.3 km	MPC · JPL
162141	1998 UQ_{40}	—	October 28, 1998	Socorro	LINEAR	·	3.5 km	MPC · JPL
162142	1998 VR	—	November 10, 1998	Socorro	LINEAR	ATE	460 m	MPC · JPL
162143	1998 VJ_{1}	—	November 10, 1998	Socorro	LINEAR	·	6.3 km	MPC · JPL
162144	1998 VZ_{32}	—	November 11, 1998	Chichibu	N. Satō	·	6.0 km	MPC · JPL
162145	1998 WH_{40}	—	November 23, 1998	Kitt Peak	Spacewatch	·	2.9 km	MPC · JPL
162146	1998 XW_{34}	—	December 14, 1998	Socorro	LINEAR	·	4.8 km	MPC · JPL
162147	1998 XV_{56}	—	December 15, 1998	Socorro	LINEAR	GEF	2.8 km	MPC · JPL
162148	1998 XJ_{80}	—	December 15, 1998	Socorro	LINEAR	·	4.5 km	MPC · JPL
162149	1998 YQ_{11}	—	December 23, 1998	Socorro	LINEAR	AMO +1km	1.1 km	MPC · JPL
162150	1998 YF_{20}	—	December 25, 1998	Kitt Peak	Spacewatch	·	2.7 km	MPC · JPL
162151	1999 AS_{11}	—	January 7, 1999	Kitt Peak	Spacewatch	·	5.2 km	MPC · JPL
162152	1999 AV_{13}	—	January 8, 1999	Kitt Peak	Spacewatch	EOS	2.7 km	MPC · JPL
162153	1999 AP_{16}	—	January 10, 1999	Kitt Peak	Spacewatch	·	1.3 km	MPC · JPL
162154	1999 AD_{20}	—	January 13, 1999	Kitt Peak	Spacewatch	·	920 m	MPC · JPL
162155	1999 BV_{7}	—	January 21, 1999	Višnjan Observatory	K. Korlević	·	3.6 km	MPC · JPL
162156	1999 BU_{28}	—	January 18, 1999	Kitt Peak	Spacewatch	VER	6.9 km	MPC · JPL
162157	1999 CV_{8}	—	February 11, 1999	Socorro	LINEAR	APO	360 m	MPC · JPL
162158 Merrillhess	1999 CZ_{9}	Merrillhess	February 15, 1999	Baton Rouge	W. R. Cooney Jr., Kandler, E.	·	6.7 km	MPC · JPL
162159	1999 CV_{140}	—	February 9, 1999	Kitt Peak	Spacewatch	·	3.4 km	MPC · JPL
162160	1999 CR_{141}	—	February 10, 1999	Kitt Peak	Spacewatch	·	1.4 km	MPC · JPL
162161	1999 DK_{3}	—	February 18, 1999	Socorro	LINEAR	AMO +1km	1.0 km	MPC · JPL
162162	1999 DB_{7}	—	February 26, 1999	Socorro	LINEAR	APO · PHA	360 m	MPC · JPL
162163	1999 ER	—	March 6, 1999	Kitt Peak	Spacewatch	·	1.1 km	MPC · JPL
162164	1999 EQ_{6}	—	March 14, 1999	Kitt Peak	Spacewatch	·	4.6 km	MPC · JPL
162165	1999 FT_{43}	—	March 20, 1999	Socorro	LINEAR	·	6.0 km	MPC · JPL
162166 Mantsch	1999 FW_{82}	Mantsch	March 20, 1999	Apache Point	SDSS	·	2.1 km	MPC · JPL
162167	1999 GH_{6}	—	April 13, 1999	Višnjan Observatory	K. Korlević	ERI	3.5 km	MPC · JPL
162168	1999 GT_{6}	—	April 15, 1999	Socorro	LINEAR	AMO +1km	1.2 km	MPC · JPL
162169	1999 GB_{14}	—	April 14, 1999	Kitt Peak	Spacewatch	·	1.5 km	MPC · JPL
162170	1999 GA_{45}	—	April 12, 1999	Socorro	LINEAR	NYS	1.3 km	MPC · JPL
162171	1999 GC_{56}	—	April 9, 1999	Kitt Peak	Spacewatch	URS	7.6 km	MPC · JPL
162172	1999 GQ_{58}	—	April 7, 1999	Socorro	LINEAR	PHO	1.7 km	MPC · JPL
162173 Ryugu	1999 JU_{3}	Ryugu	May 10, 1999	Socorro	LINEAR	APO · PHA	900 m	MPC · JPL
162174	1999 JS_{11}	—	May 12, 1999	Socorro	LINEAR	·	2.0 km	MPC · JPL
162175	1999 JJ_{45}	—	May 10, 1999	Socorro	LINEAR	·	1.7 km	MPC · JPL
162176	1999 JZ_{76}	—	May 12, 1999	Socorro	LINEAR	·	1.3 km	MPC · JPL
162177	1999 JU_{102}	—	May 13, 1999	Socorro	LINEAR	·	2.5 km	MPC · JPL
162178	1999 JT_{114}	—	May 13, 1999	Socorro	LINEAR	·	1.7 km	MPC · JPL
162179	1999 JZ_{127}	—	May 10, 1999	Socorro	LINEAR	NYS	2.1 km	MPC · JPL
162180	1999 KR_{5}	—	May 20, 1999	Bergisch Gladbach	W. Bickel	·	2.1 km	MPC · JPL
162181	1999 LF_{6}	—	June 10, 1999	Socorro	LINEAR	AMO · APO +1km	730 m	MPC · JPL
162182	1999 LY_{6}	—	June 8, 1999	Kitt Peak	Spacewatch	·	1.6 km	MPC · JPL
162183	1999 NB_{5}	—	July 13, 1999	Socorro	LINEAR	APO · PHA	200 m	MPC · JPL
162184	1999 NP_{22}	—	July 14, 1999	Socorro	LINEAR	·	1.5 km	MPC · JPL
162185	1999 NK_{27}	—	July 14, 1999	Socorro	LINEAR	·	4.8 km	MPC · JPL
162186	1999 OP_{3}	—	July 22, 1999	Socorro	LINEAR	T_{j} (2.93) · AMO +1km	3.5 km	MPC · JPL
162187	1999 QR_{2}	—	August 31, 1999	Ondřejov	L. Kotková	·	1.6 km	MPC · JPL
162188	1999 RB_{2}	—	September 6, 1999	Catalina	CSS	H	1.2 km	MPC · JPL
162189	1999 RQ_{2}	—	September 6, 1999	Catalina	CSS	H	1.1 km	MPC · JPL
162190	1999 RP_{14}	—	September 7, 1999	Socorro	LINEAR	H	820 m	MPC · JPL
162191	1999 RX_{16}	—	September 7, 1999	Socorro	LINEAR	·	1.8 km	MPC · JPL
162192	1999 RY_{28}	—	September 7, 1999	Socorro	LINEAR	H	960 m	MPC · JPL
162193	1999 RO_{30}	—	September 8, 1999	Socorro	LINEAR	H	730 m	MPC · JPL
162194	1999 RP_{35}	—	September 11, 1999	Višnjan Observatory	K. Korlević	·	1.7 km	MPC · JPL
162195	1999 RK_{45}	—	September 13, 1999	Socorro	LINEAR	APO	450 m	MPC · JPL
162196	1999 RL_{45}	—	September 14, 1999	Socorro	LINEAR	AMO	620 m	MPC · JPL
162197	1999 RA_{50}	—	September 7, 1999	Socorro	LINEAR	·	2.3 km	MPC · JPL
162198	1999 RM_{55}	—	September 7, 1999	Socorro	LINEAR	·	2.4 km	MPC · JPL
162199	1999 RU_{101}	—	September 8, 1999	Socorro	LINEAR	·	2.8 km	MPC · JPL
162200	1999 RY_{106}	—	September 8, 1999	Socorro	LINEAR	KON	4.4 km	MPC · JPL

== 162201–162300 ==
back to top

Designation			Discovery			Properties		Ref
Permanent	Provisional	Named after	Date	Site	Discoverer(s)	Category	Diam.	Ref
162201	1999 RK_{117}	—	September 9, 1999	Socorro	LINEAR	H	900 m	MPC · JPL
162202	1999 RB_{156}	—	September 9, 1999	Socorro	LINEAR	(5)	1.7 km	MPC · JPL
162203	1999 RV_{158}	—	September 9, 1999	Socorro	LINEAR	·	1.6 km	MPC · JPL
162204	1999 RJ_{160}	—	September 9, 1999	Socorro	LINEAR	·	3.6 km	MPC · JPL
162205	1999 RH_{165}	—	September 9, 1999	Socorro	LINEAR	(5)	1.6 km	MPC · JPL
162206	1999 RN_{165}	—	September 9, 1999	Socorro	LINEAR	NYS	2.0 km	MPC · JPL
162207	1999 RK_{200}	—	September 8, 1999	Socorro	LINEAR	·	1.9 km	MPC · JPL
162208	1999 RB_{258}	—	September 6, 1999	Anderson Mesa	LONEOS	H	910 m	MPC · JPL
162209	1999 SD_{3}	—	September 24, 1999	Socorro	LINEAR	BAR	2.8 km	MPC · JPL
162210	1999 SM_{5}	—	September 28, 1999	Socorro	LINEAR	APO	490 m	MPC · JPL
162211	1999 SE_{18}	—	September 30, 1999	Socorro	LINEAR	·	4.5 km	MPC · JPL
162212	1999 SP_{25}	—	September 30, 1999	Catalina	CSS	·	3.6 km	MPC · JPL
162213	1999 TL_{3}	—	October 4, 1999	Prescott	P. G. Comba	·	1.4 km	MPC · JPL
162214	1999 TC_{10}	—	October 8, 1999	Catalina	CSS	APO	600 m	MPC · JPL
162215	1999 TL_{12}	—	October 10, 1999	Socorro	LINEAR	APO	520 m	MPC · JPL
162216	1999 TD_{13}	—	October 10, 1999	Oizumi	T. Kobayashi	·	1.3 km	MPC · JPL
162217	1999 TC_{34}	—	October 4, 1999	Socorro	LINEAR	(5)	1.4 km	MPC · JPL
162218	1999 TW_{54}	—	October 6, 1999	Kitt Peak	Spacewatch	(7744)	2.0 km	MPC · JPL
162219	1999 TS_{63}	—	October 7, 1999	Kitt Peak	Spacewatch	·	2.6 km	MPC · JPL
162220	1999 TL_{79}	—	October 11, 1999	Kitt Peak	Spacewatch	·	1.2 km	MPC · JPL
162221	1999 TM_{87}	—	October 15, 1999	Kitt Peak	Spacewatch	(7744)	2.3 km	MPC · JPL
162222	1999 TS_{102}	—	October 2, 1999	Socorro	LINEAR	·	4.7 km	MPC · JPL
162223	1999 TR_{119}	—	October 4, 1999	Socorro	LINEAR	·	2.6 km	MPC · JPL
162224	1999 TD_{120}	—	October 4, 1999	Socorro	LINEAR	(5)	2.1 km	MPC · JPL
162225	1999 TX_{121}	—	October 4, 1999	Socorro	LINEAR	(5)	1.9 km	MPC · JPL
162226	1999 TR_{127}	—	October 4, 1999	Socorro	LINEAR	·	2.0 km	MPC · JPL
162227	1999 TS_{127}	—	October 4, 1999	Socorro	LINEAR	T_{j} (2.99) · 3:2 · SHU	7.3 km	MPC · JPL
162228	1999 TS_{132}	—	October 6, 1999	Socorro	LINEAR	·	1.6 km	MPC · JPL
162229	1999 TJ_{143}	—	October 7, 1999	Socorro	LINEAR	·	1.5 km	MPC · JPL
162230	1999 TS_{148}	—	October 7, 1999	Socorro	LINEAR	·	1.5 km	MPC · JPL
162231	1999 TP_{149}	—	October 15, 1999	Socorro	LINEAR	·	2.3 km	MPC · JPL
162232	1999 TC_{154}	—	October 7, 1999	Socorro	LINEAR	T_{j} (2.91)	6.4 km	MPC · JPL
162233	1999 TL_{173}	—	October 10, 1999	Socorro	LINEAR	·	1.6 km	MPC · JPL
162234	1999 TQ_{185}	—	October 12, 1999	Socorro	LINEAR	EUN	2.3 km	MPC · JPL
162235	1999 TR_{185}	—	October 12, 1999	Socorro	LINEAR	H	1.1 km	MPC · JPL
162236	1999 TE_{192}	—	October 12, 1999	Socorro	LINEAR	·	2.7 km	MPC · JPL
162237	1999 TF_{196}	—	October 12, 1999	Socorro	LINEAR	·	1.7 km	MPC · JPL
162238	1999 TP_{198}	—	October 12, 1999	Socorro	LINEAR	·	2.9 km	MPC · JPL
162239	1999 TU_{198}	—	October 12, 1999	Socorro	LINEAR	·	1.8 km	MPC · JPL
162240	1999 TU_{208}	—	October 14, 1999	Socorro	LINEAR	·	2.6 km	MPC · JPL
162241	1999 TZ_{217}	—	October 15, 1999	Socorro	LINEAR	·	1.6 km	MPC · JPL
162242	1999 TC_{219}	—	October 1, 1999	Catalina	CSS	·	1.5 km	MPC · JPL
162243	1999 TS_{228}	—	October 2, 1999	Anderson Mesa	LONEOS	·	1.9 km	MPC · JPL
162244	1999 TD_{236}	—	October 3, 1999	Catalina	CSS	·	3.1 km	MPC · JPL
162245	1999 TT_{241}	—	October 4, 1999	Catalina	CSS	·	2.1 km	MPC · JPL
162246	1999 TO_{248}	—	October 8, 1999	Catalina	CSS	·	1.8 km	MPC · JPL
162247	1999 TJ_{253}	—	October 9, 1999	Socorro	LINEAR	·	2.8 km	MPC · JPL
162248	1999 TW_{267}	—	October 3, 1999	Socorro	LINEAR	ADE	4.7 km	MPC · JPL
162249	1999 TX_{277}	—	October 6, 1999	Socorro	LINEAR	·	2.1 km	MPC · JPL
162250	1999 TK_{288}	—	October 10, 1999	Socorro	LINEAR	·	2.1 km	MPC · JPL
162251	1999 TM_{289}	—	October 10, 1999	Socorro	LINEAR	·	1.8 km	MPC · JPL
162252	1999 TJ_{290}	—	October 10, 1999	Socorro	LINEAR	·	1.4 km	MPC · JPL
162253	1999 TQ_{297}	—	October 2, 1999	Kitt Peak	Spacewatch	·	1.7 km	MPC · JPL
162254	1999 TC_{313}	—	October 9, 1999	Socorro	LINEAR	·	2.8 km	MPC · JPL
162255	1999 TU_{313}	—	October 9, 1999	Socorro	LINEAR	(5)	3.3 km	MPC · JPL
162256	1999 TR_{314}	—	October 7, 1999	Socorro	LINEAR	T_{j} (2.97) · HIL · 3:2	8.8 km	MPC · JPL
162257	1999 TS_{314}	—	October 7, 1999	Socorro	LINEAR	·	2.0 km	MPC · JPL
162258	1999 TY_{322}	—	October 2, 1999	Socorro	LINEAR	·	1.4 km	MPC · JPL
162259	1999 UV_{9}	—	October 31, 1999	Socorro	LINEAR	·	7.0 km	MPC · JPL
162260	1999 UB_{10}	—	October 31, 1999	Socorro	LINEAR	H	900 m	MPC · JPL
162261	1999 UE_{17}	—	October 30, 1999	Catalina	CSS	H	940 m	MPC · JPL
162262	1999 UZ_{20}	—	October 31, 1999	Kitt Peak	Spacewatch	·	1.5 km	MPC · JPL
162263	1999 UB_{25}	—	October 28, 1999	Catalina	CSS	(5)	1.6 km	MPC · JPL
162264	1999 UN_{38}	—	October 29, 1999	Anderson Mesa	LONEOS	(5)	3.1 km	MPC · JPL
162265	1999 UD_{39}	—	October 29, 1999	Anderson Mesa	LONEOS	(5)	2.7 km	MPC · JPL
162266	1999 UR_{45}	—	October 31, 1999	Catalina	CSS	·	1.6 km	MPC · JPL
162267	1999 UC_{47}	—	October 29, 1999	Anderson Mesa	LONEOS	·	2.5 km	MPC · JPL
162268	1999 UL_{51}	—	October 31, 1999	Catalina	CSS	·	2.5 km	MPC · JPL
162269	1999 VO_{6}	—	November 5, 1999	Socorro	LINEAR	APO +1km	1.0 km	MPC · JPL
162270	1999 VU_{7}	—	November 7, 1999	Višnjan Observatory	K. Korlević	·	2.5 km	MPC · JPL
162271	1999 VC_{8}	—	November 8, 1999	Višnjan Observatory	K. Korlević	(5)	2.1 km	MPC · JPL
162272	1999 VQ_{9}	—	November 9, 1999	Višnjan Observatory	K. Korlević	·	5.8 km	MPC · JPL
162273	1999 VL_{12}	—	November 9, 1999	Socorro	LINEAR	AMO +1km	1.2 km	MPC · JPL
162274	1999 VO_{19}	—	November 10, 1999	Višnjan Observatory	K. Korlević	·	2.0 km	MPC · JPL
162275	1999 VM_{21}	—	November 12, 1999	Višnjan Observatory	K. Korlević	·	2.4 km	MPC · JPL
162276	1999 VC_{33}	—	November 3, 1999	Socorro	LINEAR	·	1.9 km	MPC · JPL
162277	1999 VY_{44}	—	November 4, 1999	Catalina	CSS	·	2.2 km	MPC · JPL
162278	1999 VU_{49}	—	November 3, 1999	Socorro	LINEAR	(5)	1.8 km	MPC · JPL
162279	1999 VS_{57}	—	November 4, 1999	Socorro	LINEAR	·	2.5 km	MPC · JPL
162280	1999 VN_{59}	—	November 4, 1999	Socorro	LINEAR	3:2 · SHU	9.6 km	MPC · JPL
162281	1999 VF_{62}	—	November 4, 1999	Socorro	LINEAR	·	2.1 km	MPC · JPL
162282	1999 VS_{69}	—	November 4, 1999	Socorro	LINEAR	·	3.0 km	MPC · JPL
162283	1999 VJ_{73}	—	November 1, 1999	Kitt Peak	Spacewatch	·	1.3 km	MPC · JPL
162284	1999 VU_{77}	—	November 3, 1999	Socorro	LINEAR	T_{j} (2.96) · HIL · 3:2	10 km	MPC · JPL
162285	1999 VT_{81}	—	November 5, 1999	Socorro	LINEAR	·	2.3 km	MPC · JPL
162286	1999 VB_{102}	—	November 9, 1999	Socorro	LINEAR	·	2.1 km	MPC · JPL
162287	1999 VN_{107}	—	November 9, 1999	Socorro	LINEAR	·	1.2 km	MPC · JPL
162288	1999 VW_{123}	—	November 5, 1999	Kitt Peak	Spacewatch	·	1.6 km	MPC · JPL
162289	1999 VJ_{124}	—	November 6, 1999	Kitt Peak	Spacewatch	·	1.9 km	MPC · JPL
162290	1999 VG_{129}	—	November 11, 1999	Kitt Peak	Spacewatch	(5)	2.1 km	MPC · JPL
162291	1999 VP_{137}	—	November 12, 1999	Socorro	LINEAR	(17392)	2.1 km	MPC · JPL
162292	1999 VO_{142}	—	November 10, 1999	Kitt Peak	Spacewatch	·	1.9 km	MPC · JPL
162293	1999 VY_{142}	—	November 13, 1999	Kitt Peak	Spacewatch	·	1.4 km	MPC · JPL
162294	1999 VQ_{148}	—	November 14, 1999	Socorro	LINEAR	(5)	2.0 km	MPC · JPL
162295	1999 VW_{149}	—	November 14, 1999	Socorro	LINEAR	·	2.3 km	MPC · JPL
162296	1999 VD_{151}	—	November 14, 1999	Socorro	LINEAR	·	1.5 km	MPC · JPL
162297	1999 VU_{167}	—	November 14, 1999	Socorro	LINEAR	·	2.8 km	MPC · JPL
162298	1999 VZ_{174}	—	November 4, 1999	Kitt Peak	Spacewatch	·	3.4 km	MPC · JPL
162299	1999 VW_{180}	—	November 7, 1999	Socorro	LINEAR	H	1.0 km	MPC · JPL
162300	1999 VY_{180}	—	November 7, 1999	Socorro	LINEAR	H	1.2 km	MPC · JPL

== 162301–162400 ==
back to top

Designation			Discovery			Properties		Ref
Permanent	Provisional	Named after	Date	Site	Discoverer(s)	Category	Diam.	Ref
162301	1999 VX_{183}	—	November 14, 1999	Socorro	LINEAR	(5)	1.9 km	MPC · JPL
162302	1999 VO_{184}	—	November 15, 1999	Socorro	LINEAR	·	2.3 km	MPC · JPL
162303	1999 VW_{186}	—	November 15, 1999	Socorro	LINEAR	H	940 m	MPC · JPL
162304	1999 VR_{193}	—	November 3, 1999	Anderson Mesa	LONEOS	(5)	2.1 km	MPC · JPL
162305	1999 VD_{194}	—	November 1, 1999	Catalina	CSS	·	2.1 km	MPC · JPL
162306	1999 VE_{200}	—	November 5, 1999	Catalina	CSS	·	3.4 km	MPC · JPL
162307	1999 VP_{213}	—	November 13, 1999	Catalina	CSS	·	3.6 km	MPC · JPL
162308	1999 VL_{225}	—	November 5, 1999	Socorro	LINEAR	(5)	1.6 km	MPC · JPL
162309	1999 WK_{10}	—	November 28, 1999	Kitt Peak	Spacewatch	·	1.5 km	MPC · JPL
162310	1999 WN_{13}	—	November 29, 1999	Višnjan Observatory	K. Korlević	(5)	2.1 km	MPC · JPL
162311	1999 WM_{17}	—	November 30, 1999	Kitt Peak	Spacewatch	·	1.7 km	MPC · JPL
162312	1999 WG_{20}	—	November 16, 1999	Socorro	LINEAR	(5)	2.1 km	MPC · JPL
162313	1999 WA_{24}	—	November 17, 1999	Kitt Peak	Spacewatch	·	2.1 km	MPC · JPL
162314	1999 XE_{7}	—	December 4, 1999	Catalina	CSS	T_{j} (2.97) · HIL · 3:2 · (6124)	9.9 km	MPC · JPL
162315	1999 XC_{11}	—	December 5, 1999	Catalina	CSS	·	2.0 km	MPC · JPL
162316	1999 XY_{14}	—	December 6, 1999	Socorro	LINEAR	·	4.3 km	MPC · JPL
162317	1999 XB_{23}	—	December 6, 1999	Socorro	LINEAR	EUN	2.0 km	MPC · JPL
162318	1999 XQ_{25}	—	December 6, 1999	Socorro	LINEAR	·	2.6 km	MPC · JPL
162319	1999 XS_{26}	—	December 6, 1999	Socorro	LINEAR	(5)	2.0 km	MPC · JPL
162320	1999 XN_{27}	—	December 6, 1999	Socorro	LINEAR	·	2.4 km	MPC · JPL
162321	1999 XG_{30}	—	December 6, 1999	Socorro	LINEAR	·	2.2 km	MPC · JPL
162322	1999 XZ_{42}	—	December 7, 1999	Socorro	LINEAR	·	2.0 km	MPC · JPL
162323	1999 XA_{45}	—	December 7, 1999	Socorro	LINEAR	·	2.5 km	MPC · JPL
162324	1999 XB_{50}	—	December 7, 1999	Socorro	LINEAR	·	2.1 km	MPC · JPL
162325	1999 XC_{50}	—	December 7, 1999	Socorro	LINEAR	·	1.8 km	MPC · JPL
162326	1999 XB_{52}	—	December 7, 1999	Socorro	LINEAR	·	2.4 km	MPC · JPL
162327	1999 XA_{55}	—	December 7, 1999	Socorro	LINEAR	·	2.9 km	MPC · JPL
162328	1999 XJ_{59}	—	December 7, 1999	Socorro	LINEAR	(5)	2.3 km	MPC · JPL
162329	1999 XM_{64}	—	December 7, 1999	Socorro	LINEAR	(5)	2.5 km	MPC · JPL
162330	1999 XW_{65}	—	December 7, 1999	Socorro	LINEAR	·	1.8 km	MPC · JPL
162331	1999 XT_{66}	—	December 7, 1999	Socorro	LINEAR	(5)	3.7 km	MPC · JPL
162332	1999 XK_{101}	—	December 7, 1999	Socorro	LINEAR	(5)	2.6 km	MPC · JPL
162333	1999 XZ_{101}	—	December 7, 1999	Socorro	LINEAR	(5)	3.5 km	MPC · JPL
162334	1999 XP_{103}	—	December 7, 1999	Socorro	LINEAR	EUN	2.7 km	MPC · JPL
162335	1999 XN_{113}	—	December 11, 1999	Socorro	LINEAR	EUN	2.4 km	MPC · JPL
162336	1999 XT_{118}	—	December 5, 1999	Catalina	CSS	(5)	1.8 km	MPC · JPL
162337	1999 XK_{124}	—	December 7, 1999	Catalina	CSS	·	3.1 km	MPC · JPL
162338	1999 XT_{129}	—	December 12, 1999	Socorro	LINEAR	·	3.4 km	MPC · JPL
162339	1999 XR_{133}	—	December 12, 1999	Socorro	LINEAR	·	3.1 km	MPC · JPL
162340	1999 XT_{134}	—	December 5, 1999	Socorro	LINEAR	·	2.6 km	MPC · JPL
162341	1999 XV_{134}	—	December 5, 1999	Socorro	LINEAR	·	3.3 km	MPC · JPL
162342	1999 XT_{138}	—	December 5, 1999	Kitt Peak	Spacewatch	PAD	3.8 km	MPC · JPL
162343	1999 XG_{155}	—	December 8, 1999	Socorro	LINEAR	(5)	1.8 km	MPC · JPL
162344	1999 XX_{159}	—	December 8, 1999	Socorro	LINEAR	(5)	2.4 km	MPC · JPL
162345	1999 XT_{162}	—	December 8, 1999	Kitt Peak	Spacewatch	·	5.0 km	MPC · JPL
162346	1999 XX_{167}	—	December 10, 1999	Socorro	LINEAR	·	3.0 km	MPC · JPL
162347	1999 XD_{172}	—	December 10, 1999	Socorro	LINEAR	·	2.4 km	MPC · JPL
162348	1999 XT_{187}	—	December 12, 1999	Socorro	LINEAR	·	2.9 km	MPC · JPL
162349	1999 XH_{208}	—	December 13, 1999	Socorro	LINEAR	·	1.8 km	MPC · JPL
162350	1999 XX_{212}	—	December 14, 1999	Socorro	LINEAR	MAR	1.9 km	MPC · JPL
162351	1999 XV_{215}	—	December 15, 1999	Socorro	LINEAR	·	2.9 km	MPC · JPL
162352	1999 XS_{226}	—	December 14, 1999	Kitt Peak	Spacewatch	L4	12 km	MPC · JPL
162353	1999 YX	—	December 16, 1999	Fountain Hills	C. W. Juels	·	1.8 km	MPC · JPL
162354	1999 YQ_{5}	—	December 28, 1999	Socorro	LINEAR	(116763)	5.8 km	MPC · JPL
162355	1999 YW_{5}	—	December 29, 1999	Socorro	LINEAR	BAR	2.4 km	MPC · JPL
162356	1999 YA_{6}	—	December 29, 1999	Socorro	LINEAR	·	7.1 km	MPC · JPL
162357	1999 YA_{7}	—	December 30, 1999	Socorro	LINEAR	ADE	6.0 km	MPC · JPL
162358	1999 YT_{7}	—	December 27, 1999	Kitt Peak	Spacewatch	·	3.4 km	MPC · JPL
162359	1999 YH_{22}	—	December 27, 1999	Kitt Peak	Spacewatch	·	1.7 km	MPC · JPL
162360	2000 AH_{3}	—	January 2, 2000	Socorro	LINEAR	·	5.9 km	MPC · JPL
162361	2000 AF_{6}	—	January 4, 2000	Socorro	LINEAR	ATE · PHA	320 m	MPC · JPL
162362	2000 AU_{23}	—	January 3, 2000	Socorro	LINEAR	EUN	2.3 km	MPC · JPL
162363	2000 AN_{34}	—	January 3, 2000	Socorro	LINEAR	·	3.4 km	MPC · JPL
162364	2000 AB_{70}	—	January 5, 2000	Socorro	LINEAR	RAF	1.6 km	MPC · JPL
162365	2000 AK_{77}	—	January 5, 2000	Socorro	LINEAR	·	2.7 km	MPC · JPL
162366	2000 AD_{83}	—	January 5, 2000	Socorro	LINEAR	·	2.6 km	MPC · JPL
162367	2000 AJ_{101}	—	January 5, 2000	Socorro	LINEAR	(5)	2.7 km	MPC · JPL
162368	2000 AV_{101}	—	January 5, 2000	Socorro	LINEAR	(5)	2.7 km	MPC · JPL
162369	2000 AZ_{112}	—	January 5, 2000	Socorro	LINEAR	·	2.3 km	MPC · JPL
162370	2000 AE_{119}	—	January 5, 2000	Socorro	LINEAR	·	2.0 km	MPC · JPL
162371	2000 AY_{145}	—	January 7, 2000	Socorro	LINEAR	·	2.8 km	MPC · JPL
162372	2000 AG_{149}	—	January 7, 2000	Socorro	LINEAR	·	1.7 km	MPC · JPL
162373	2000 AR_{155}	—	January 3, 2000	Socorro	LINEAR	·	2.4 km	MPC · JPL
162374	2000 AC_{175}	—	January 7, 2000	Socorro	LINEAR	·	3.3 km	MPC · JPL
162375	2000 AK_{180}	—	January 7, 2000	Socorro	LINEAR	·	2.6 km	MPC · JPL
162376	2000 AE_{191}	—	January 8, 2000	Socorro	LINEAR	·	3.3 km	MPC · JPL
162377	2000 AL_{196}	—	January 8, 2000	Socorro	LINEAR	·	4.5 km	MPC · JPL
162378	2000 AF_{201}	—	January 9, 2000	Socorro	LINEAR	·	4.2 km	MPC · JPL
162379	2000 AF_{202}	—	January 10, 2000	Socorro	LINEAR	·	4.6 km	MPC · JPL
162380	2000 AW_{225}	—	January 12, 2000	Kitt Peak	Spacewatch	L4	13 km	MPC · JPL
162381	2000 AM_{226}	—	January 12, 2000	Kitt Peak	Spacewatch	HOF	5.3 km	MPC · JPL
162382	2000 AA_{254}	—	January 7, 2000	Kitt Peak	Spacewatch	AGN	2.2 km	MPC · JPL
162383	2000 BN_{2}	—	January 26, 2000	Socorro	LINEAR	HNS	2.3 km	MPC · JPL
162384	2000 BC_{6}	—	January 28, 2000	Socorro	LINEAR	·	3.3 km	MPC · JPL
162385	2000 BM_{19}	—	January 31, 2000	Socorro	LINEAR	ATE	810 m	MPC · JPL
162386	2000 BA_{26}	—	January 30, 2000	Socorro	LINEAR	·	3.2 km	MPC · JPL
162387	2000 BN_{37}	—	January 26, 2000	Kitt Peak	Spacewatch	·	2.8 km	MPC · JPL
162388	2000 BK_{39}	—	January 27, 2000	Kitt Peak	Spacewatch	L4	13 km	MPC · JPL
162389	2000 CE_{4}	—	February 2, 2000	Socorro	LINEAR	·	2.2 km	MPC · JPL
162390	2000 CD_{13}	—	February 2, 2000	Socorro	LINEAR	·	3.3 km	MPC · JPL
162391	2000 CZ_{43}	—	February 2, 2000	Socorro	LINEAR	·	3.4 km	MPC · JPL
162392	2000 CG_{45}	—	February 2, 2000	Socorro	LINEAR	·	3.1 km	MPC · JPL
162393	2000 CM_{81}	—	February 4, 2000	Socorro	LINEAR	slow	5.0 km	MPC · JPL
162394	2000 CW_{95}	—	February 10, 2000	Kitt Peak	Spacewatch	·	2.7 km	MPC · JPL
162395 Michaelbird	2000 CY_{108}	Michaelbird	February 5, 2000	Kitt Peak	M. W. Buie	·	3.1 km	MPC · JPL
162396	2000 CV_{120}	—	February 5, 2000	Kitt Peak	M. W. Buie	L4	14 km	MPC · JPL
162397	2000 CC_{135}	—	February 4, 2000	Kitt Peak	Spacewatch	·	4.5 km	MPC · JPL
162398	2000 DP_{7}	—	February 27, 2000	Needville	Needville	·	3.5 km	MPC · JPL
162399	2000 DN_{10}	—	February 26, 2000	Kitt Peak	Spacewatch	·	3.3 km	MPC · JPL
162400	2000 DR_{22}	—	February 29, 2000	Socorro	LINEAR	·	5.9 km	MPC · JPL

== 162401–162500 ==
back to top

Designation			Discovery			Properties		Ref
Permanent	Provisional	Named after	Date	Site	Discoverer(s)	Category	Diam.	Ref
162401	2000 DK_{33}	—	February 29, 2000	Socorro	LINEAR	·	2.9 km	MPC · JPL
162402	2000 DZ_{38}	—	February 29, 2000	Socorro	LINEAR	·	2.2 km	MPC · JPL
162403	2000 DA_{41}	—	February 29, 2000	Socorro	LINEAR	·	3.3 km	MPC · JPL
162404	2000 DP_{60}	—	February 29, 2000	Socorro	LINEAR	·	7.5 km	MPC · JPL
162405	2000 DH_{78}	—	February 29, 2000	Socorro	LINEAR	·	3.6 km	MPC · JPL
162406	2000 DV_{93}	—	February 28, 2000	Socorro	LINEAR	·	3.8 km	MPC · JPL
162407	2000 DF_{94}	—	February 28, 2000	Socorro	LINEAR	·	2.9 km	MPC · JPL
162408	2000 DM_{94}	—	February 28, 2000	Socorro	LINEAR	·	3.4 km	MPC · JPL
162409	2000 DK_{102}	—	February 29, 2000	Socorro	LINEAR	·	2.4 km	MPC · JPL
162410	2000 DE_{104}	—	February 29, 2000	Socorro	LINEAR	·	5.5 km	MPC · JPL
162411	2000 DM_{111}	—	February 29, 2000	Socorro	LINEAR	KOR	2.4 km	MPC · JPL
162412	2000 DF_{113}	—	February 26, 2000	Kitt Peak	Spacewatch	·	3.5 km	MPC · JPL
162413	2000 EK_{2}	—	March 3, 2000	Socorro	LINEAR	·	4.7 km	MPC · JPL
162414	2000 EL_{2}	—	March 3, 2000	Socorro	LINEAR	·	2.7 km	MPC · JPL
162415	2000 EY_{2}	—	March 3, 2000	Socorro	LINEAR	·	4.9 km	MPC · JPL
162416	2000 EH_{26}	—	March 4, 2000	Socorro	LINEAR	APO · PHA · critical	160 m	MPC · JPL
162417	2000 EA_{30}	—	March 5, 2000	Socorro	LINEAR	·	7.7 km	MPC · JPL
162418	2000 ER_{46}	—	March 9, 2000	Socorro	LINEAR	·	3.7 km	MPC · JPL
162419	2000 EA_{67}	—	March 10, 2000	Socorro	LINEAR	·	3.4 km	MPC · JPL
162420	2000 EU_{69}	—	March 10, 2000	Socorro	LINEAR	·	4.5 km	MPC · JPL
162421	2000 ET_{70}	—	March 8, 2000	Socorro	LINEAR	ATE +1km · PHA	850 m	MPC · JPL
162422	2000 EV_{70}	—	March 8, 2000	Socorro	LINEAR	APO · PHA	270 m	MPC · JPL
162423	2000 EK_{88}	—	March 9, 2000	Socorro	LINEAR	EOS	4.0 km	MPC · JPL
162424	2000 EE_{113}	—	March 9, 2000	Kitt Peak	Spacewatch	·	4.1 km	MPC · JPL
162425	2000 EF_{136}	—	March 11, 2000	Socorro	LINEAR	·	3.0 km	MPC · JPL
162426	2000 EP_{143}	—	March 3, 2000	Socorro	LINEAR	·	4.1 km	MPC · JPL
162427	2000 EH_{162}	—	March 3, 2000	Socorro	LINEAR	·	5.1 km	MPC · JPL
162428	2000 EP_{162}	—	March 3, 2000	Socorro	LINEAR	·	3.3 km	MPC · JPL
162429	2000 EM_{165}	—	March 3, 2000	Socorro	LINEAR	·	3.2 km	MPC · JPL
162430	2000 EQ_{193}	—	March 3, 2000	Socorro	LINEAR	·	3.0 km	MPC · JPL
162431	2000 FV_{4}	—	March 27, 2000	Kitt Peak	Spacewatch	slow	7.7 km	MPC · JPL
162432	2000 FR_{5}	—	March 25, 2000	Kitt Peak	Spacewatch	·	3.4 km	MPC · JPL
162433	2000 FK_{10}	—	March 26, 2000	Socorro	LINEAR	APO	480 m	MPC · JPL
162434	2000 FA_{34}	—	March 29, 2000	Socorro	LINEAR	TIR	4.1 km	MPC · JPL
162435	2000 FO_{52}	—	March 29, 2000	Kitt Peak	Spacewatch	·	5.5 km	MPC · JPL
162436	2000 FX_{52}	—	March 30, 2000	Kitt Peak	Spacewatch	·	3.0 km	MPC · JPL
162437	2000 FH_{59}	—	March 29, 2000	Socorro	LINEAR	·	4.8 km	MPC · JPL
162438	2000 GF_{3}	—	April 5, 2000	Socorro	LINEAR	·	1.3 km	MPC · JPL
162439	2000 GD_{5}	—	April 3, 2000	Socorro	LINEAR	TIR	4.0 km	MPC · JPL
162440	2000 GR_{8}	—	April 5, 2000	Socorro	LINEAR	DOR	4.5 km	MPC · JPL
162441	2000 GO_{23}	—	April 5, 2000	Socorro	LINEAR	TIR	5.0 km	MPC · JPL
162442	2000 GU_{39}	—	April 5, 2000	Socorro	LINEAR	·	4.5 km	MPC · JPL
162443	2000 GF_{40}	—	April 5, 2000	Socorro	LINEAR	·	960 m	MPC · JPL
162444	2000 GP_{63}	—	April 5, 2000	Socorro	LINEAR	·	5.1 km	MPC · JPL
162445	2000 GV_{63}	—	April 5, 2000	Socorro	LINEAR	·	4.9 km	MPC · JPL
162446	2000 GT_{83}	—	April 3, 2000	Socorro	LINEAR	·	4.0 km	MPC · JPL
162447	2000 GJ_{118}	—	April 3, 2000	Kitt Peak	Spacewatch	KOR	2.0 km	MPC · JPL
162448	2000 GW_{152}	—	April 6, 2000	Anderson Mesa	LONEOS	AEG	6.1 km	MPC · JPL
162449	2000 GC_{156}	—	April 6, 2000	Anderson Mesa	LONEOS	·	7.2 km	MPC · JPL
162450	2000 GA_{159}	—	April 7, 2000	Socorro	LINEAR	·	7.6 km	MPC · JPL
162451	2000 GB_{180}	—	April 5, 2000	Socorro	LINEAR	EOS	3.4 km	MPC · JPL
162452	2000 HO_{14}	—	April 29, 2000	Socorro	LINEAR	AMO	710 m	MPC · JPL
162453	2000 HU_{17}	—	April 24, 2000	Kitt Peak	Spacewatch	·	5.1 km	MPC · JPL
162454	2000 HO_{24}	—	April 24, 2000	Anderson Mesa	LONEOS	·	5.1 km	MPC · JPL
162455	2000 HL_{28}	—	April 29, 2000	Socorro	LINEAR	EUP	7.4 km	MPC · JPL
162456	2000 HA_{35}	—	April 27, 2000	Socorro	LINEAR	·	5.2 km	MPC · JPL
162457	2000 HO_{35}	—	April 27, 2000	Socorro	LINEAR	TIR	5.2 km	MPC · JPL
162458	2000 HK_{48}	—	April 29, 2000	Socorro	LINEAR	·	820 m	MPC · JPL
162459	2000 HO_{50}	—	April 29, 2000	Socorro	LINEAR	·	1.5 km	MPC · JPL
162460	2000 HX_{69}	—	April 26, 2000	Anderson Mesa	LONEOS	·	5.4 km	MPC · JPL
162461	2000 HS_{94}	—	April 29, 2000	Socorro	LINEAR	·	1.0 km	MPC · JPL
162462	2000 HV_{103}	—	April 27, 2000	Anderson Mesa	LONEOS	·	4.8 km	MPC · JPL
162463	2000 JH_{5}	—	May 2, 2000	Socorro	LINEAR	APO +1km	1.0 km	MPC · JPL
162464	2000 JR_{60}	—	May 7, 2000	Socorro	LINEAR	slow	3.8 km	MPC · JPL
162465	2000 JU_{81}	—	May 7, 2000	Socorro	LINEAR	·	1 km	MPC · JPL
162466 Margon	2000 JA_{90}	Margon	May 4, 2000	Apache Point	SDSS	·	4.9 km	MPC · JPL
162467	2000 KJ_{20}	—	May 28, 2000	Socorro	LINEAR	·	1.0 km	MPC · JPL
162468	2000 KW_{23}	—	May 28, 2000	Socorro	LINEAR	TIR	6.1 km	MPC · JPL
162469	2000 KK_{40}	—	May 26, 2000	Kitt Peak	Spacewatch	·	7.8 km	MPC · JPL
162470	2000 KX_{43}	—	May 29, 2000	Anderson Mesa	LONEOS	APO	500 m	MPC · JPL
162471	2000 KK_{60}	—	May 25, 2000	Anderson Mesa	LONEOS	EUP	7.2 km	MPC · JPL
162472	2000 LL	—	June 1, 2000	Socorro	LINEAR	AMO	510 m	MPC · JPL
162473	2000 LA_{16}	—	June 7, 2000	Kitt Peak	Spacewatch	·	960 m	MPC · JPL
162474	2000 LB_{16}	—	June 7, 2000	Socorro	LINEAR	APO · PHA	670 m	MPC · JPL
162475	2000 MV_{4}	—	June 25, 2000	Socorro	LINEAR	·	1.6 km	MPC · JPL
162476	2000 NC_{21}	—	July 6, 2000	Anderson Mesa	LONEOS	·	2.1 km	MPC · JPL
162477	2000 NV_{28}	—	July 2, 2000	Kitt Peak	Spacewatch	·	1.4 km	MPC · JPL
162478	2000 OT_{9}	—	July 31, 2000	Ondřejov	L. Kotková	·	1.1 km	MPC · JPL
162479	2000 OH_{31}	—	July 30, 2000	Socorro	LINEAR	·	1.6 km	MPC · JPL
162480	2000 OL_{36}	—	July 30, 2000	Socorro	LINEAR	V	990 m	MPC · JPL
162481	2000 OM_{56}	—	July 29, 2000	Anderson Mesa	LONEOS	·	1.3 km	MPC · JPL
162482	2000 ON_{59}	—	July 29, 2000	Anderson Mesa	LONEOS	·	1.1 km	MPC · JPL
162483	2000 PJ_{5}	—	August 4, 2000	Socorro	LINEAR	ATE +1km · moon	910 m	MPC · JPL
162484	2000 PD_{10}	—	August 1, 2000	Socorro	LINEAR	·	1.6 km	MPC · JPL
162485	2000 PA_{14}	—	August 1, 2000	Socorro	LINEAR	·	1.5 km	MPC · JPL
162486	2000 PN_{14}	—	August 1, 2000	Socorro	LINEAR	·	1.3 km	MPC · JPL
162487	2000 PF_{15}	—	August 1, 2000	Socorro	LINEAR	·	1.3 km	MPC · JPL
162488	2000 PV_{19}	—	August 1, 2000	Socorro	LINEAR	·	1.4 km	MPC · JPL
162489	2000 PX_{19}	—	August 1, 2000	Socorro	LINEAR	·	1.4 km	MPC · JPL
162490	2000 PA_{21}	—	August 1, 2000	Socorro	LINEAR	·	1.5 km	MPC · JPL
162491	2000 PV_{23}	—	August 2, 2000	Socorro	LINEAR	·	1.2 km	MPC · JPL
162492	2000 QA_{2}	—	August 24, 2000	Socorro	LINEAR	·	4.0 km	MPC · JPL
162493	2000 QY_{7}	—	August 25, 2000	Višnjan Observatory	K. Korlević, M. Jurić	·	1.8 km	MPC · JPL
162494	2000 QA_{8}	—	August 25, 2000	Višnjan Observatory	K. Korlević, M. Jurić	·	1.5 km	MPC · JPL
162495	2000 QV_{17}	—	August 24, 2000	Socorro	LINEAR	(2076)	1.2 km	MPC · JPL
162496	2000 QH_{26}	—	August 26, 2000	Ondřejov	P. Pravec, P. Kušnirák	V	1.3 km	MPC · JPL
162497	2000 QW_{26}	—	August 24, 2000	Socorro	LINEAR	·	1.8 km	MPC · JPL
162498	2000 QH_{32}	—	August 26, 2000	Socorro	LINEAR	·	1.4 km	MPC · JPL
162499	2000 QZ_{33}	—	August 26, 2000	Višnjan Observatory	K. Korlević, M. Jurić	·	1.5 km	MPC · JPL
162500 Silvanodelbo’	2000 QE_{38}	Silvanodelbo’	August 24, 2000	Socorro	LINEAR	·	1.4 km	MPC · JPL

== 162501–162600 ==
back to top

Designation			Discovery			Properties		Ref
Permanent	Provisional	Named after	Date	Site	Discoverer(s)	Category	Diam.	Ref
162501	2000 QH_{38}	—	August 24, 2000	Socorro	LINEAR	·	1.8 km	MPC · JPL
162502	2000 QL_{38}	—	August 24, 2000	Socorro	LINEAR	·	1.5 km	MPC · JPL
162503	2000 QF_{41}	—	August 24, 2000	Socorro	LINEAR	·	1.5 km	MPC · JPL
162504	2000 QM_{43}	—	August 24, 2000	Socorro	LINEAR	·	1.7 km	MPC · JPL
162505	2000 QP_{48}	—	August 24, 2000	Socorro	LINEAR	·	1.4 km	MPC · JPL
162506	2000 QC_{49}	—	August 24, 2000	Socorro	LINEAR	·	1.2 km	MPC · JPL
162507	2000 QE_{60}	—	August 26, 2000	Socorro	LINEAR	·	1.6 km	MPC · JPL
162508	2000 QA_{65}	—	August 28, 2000	Socorro	LINEAR	·	2.2 km	MPC · JPL
162509	2000 QV_{66}	—	August 28, 2000	Socorro	LINEAR	NYS	2.5 km	MPC · JPL
162510	2000 QW_{69}	—	August 28, 2000	Socorro	LINEAR	APO +1km · PHA	1.4 km	MPC · JPL
162511	2000 QP_{73}	—	August 24, 2000	Socorro	LINEAR	·	1.6 km	MPC · JPL
162512	2000 QT_{80}	—	August 24, 2000	Socorro	LINEAR	·	1.3 km	MPC · JPL
162513	2000 QQ_{86}	—	August 25, 2000	Socorro	LINEAR	·	1.5 km	MPC · JPL
162514	2000 QR_{97}	—	August 28, 2000	Socorro	LINEAR	·	1.5 km	MPC · JPL
162515	2000 QK_{99}	—	August 28, 2000	Socorro	LINEAR	·	1.9 km	MPC · JPL
162516	2000 QX_{106}	—	August 29, 2000	Socorro	LINEAR	·	1.4 km	MPC · JPL
162517	2000 QA_{107}	—	August 29, 2000	Socorro	LINEAR	·	4.6 km	MPC · JPL
162518	2000 QR_{108}	—	August 29, 2000	Socorro	LINEAR	·	1.5 km	MPC · JPL
162519	2000 QX_{113}	—	August 24, 2000	Socorro	LINEAR	·	2.2 km	MPC · JPL
162520	2000 QR_{119}	—	August 25, 2000	Socorro	LINEAR	·	1.6 km	MPC · JPL
162521	2000 QA_{121}	—	August 25, 2000	Socorro	LINEAR	V	1.3 km	MPC · JPL
162522	2000 QR_{122}	—	August 25, 2000	Socorro	LINEAR	·	1.6 km	MPC · JPL
162523	2000 QQ_{125}	—	August 31, 2000	Socorro	LINEAR	V	1.1 km	MPC · JPL
162524	2000 QT_{125}	—	August 31, 2000	Socorro	LINEAR	V	1.1 km	MPC · JPL
162525	2000 QK_{127}	—	August 24, 2000	Socorro	LINEAR	·	1.9 km	MPC · JPL
162526	2000 QV_{131}	—	August 25, 2000	Socorro	LINEAR	·	1.6 km	MPC · JPL
162527	2000 QO_{134}	—	August 26, 2000	Socorro	LINEAR	·	1.4 km	MPC · JPL
162528	2000 QT_{134}	—	August 26, 2000	Socorro	LINEAR	·	1.9 km	MPC · JPL
162529	2000 QE_{141}	—	August 31, 2000	Socorro	LINEAR	NYS	1.8 km	MPC · JPL
162530	2000 QV_{141}	—	August 31, 2000	Socorro	LINEAR	·	1.8 km	MPC · JPL
162531	2000 QW_{142}	—	August 31, 2000	Socorro	LINEAR	·	2.1 km	MPC · JPL
162532	2000 QC_{146}	—	August 31, 2000	Socorro	LINEAR	·	1.7 km	MPC · JPL
162533	2000 QW_{146}	—	August 31, 2000	Socorro	LINEAR	·	1.8 km	MPC · JPL
162534	2000 QR_{157}	—	August 31, 2000	Socorro	LINEAR	·	1.6 km	MPC · JPL
162535	2000 QN_{158}	—	August 31, 2000	Socorro	LINEAR	·	1.4 km	MPC · JPL
162536	2000 QB_{161}	—	August 31, 2000	Socorro	LINEAR	·	1.4 km	MPC · JPL
162537	2000 QP_{164}	—	August 31, 2000	Socorro	LINEAR	·	1.8 km	MPC · JPL
162538	2000 QQ_{164}	—	August 31, 2000	Socorro	LINEAR	(2076)	1.4 km	MPC · JPL
162539	2000 QA_{166}	—	August 31, 2000	Socorro	LINEAR	·	1.5 km	MPC · JPL
162540	2000 QZ_{167}	—	August 31, 2000	Socorro	LINEAR	·	2.6 km	MPC · JPL
162541	2000 QY_{170}	—	August 31, 2000	Socorro	LINEAR	·	1.3 km	MPC · JPL
162542	2000 QX_{174}	—	August 31, 2000	Socorro	LINEAR	·	1.4 km	MPC · JPL
162543	2000 QC_{177}	—	August 31, 2000	Socorro	LINEAR	·	1.0 km	MPC · JPL
162544	2000 QF_{187}	—	August 26, 2000	Socorro	LINEAR	(2076)	1.5 km	MPC · JPL
162545	2000 QR_{205}	—	August 31, 2000	Socorro	LINEAR	·	1.4 km	MPC · JPL
162546	2000 QM_{207}	—	August 31, 2000	Socorro	LINEAR	NYS	2.5 km	MPC · JPL
162547	2000 QR_{208}	—	August 31, 2000	Socorro	LINEAR	·	1.5 km	MPC · JPL
162548	2000 QH_{212}	—	August 31, 2000	Socorro	LINEAR	NYS	1.1 km	MPC · JPL
162549	2000 QT_{213}	—	August 31, 2000	Socorro	LINEAR	ERI	2.4 km	MPC · JPL
162550	2000 QF_{217}	—	August 31, 2000	Socorro	LINEAR	·	1.2 km	MPC · JPL
162551	2000 QS_{226}	—	August 31, 2000	Socorro	LINEAR	·	1.8 km	MPC · JPL
162552	2000 QC_{251}	—	August 21, 2000	Anderson Mesa	LONEOS	·	1.8 km	MPC · JPL
162553	2000 RH_{12}	—	September 3, 2000	Socorro	LINEAR	·	2.1 km	MPC · JPL
162554	2000 RK_{13}	—	September 1, 2000	Socorro	LINEAR	V	1.2 km	MPC · JPL
162555	2000 RZ_{14}	—	September 1, 2000	Socorro	LINEAR	·	1.5 km	MPC · JPL
162556	2000 RW_{16}	—	September 1, 2000	Socorro	LINEAR	V	1.3 km	MPC · JPL
162557	2000 RP_{20}	—	September 1, 2000	Socorro	LINEAR	·	2.0 km	MPC · JPL
162558	2000 RF_{21}	—	September 1, 2000	Socorro	LINEAR	·	1.9 km	MPC · JPL
162559	2000 RY_{21}	—	September 1, 2000	Socorro	LINEAR	·	1.6 km	MPC · JPL
162560	2000 RJ_{23}	—	September 1, 2000	Socorro	LINEAR	·	1.4 km	MPC · JPL
162561	2000 RT_{24}	—	September 1, 2000	Socorro	LINEAR	·	1.6 km	MPC · JPL
162562	2000 RA_{27}	—	September 1, 2000	Socorro	LINEAR	·	1.2 km	MPC · JPL
162563	2000 RU_{27}	—	September 1, 2000	Socorro	LINEAR	·	2.7 km	MPC · JPL
162564	2000 RO_{31}	—	September 1, 2000	Socorro	LINEAR	·	1.8 km	MPC · JPL
162565	2000 RU_{31}	—	September 1, 2000	Socorro	LINEAR	·	2.4 km	MPC · JPL
162566	2000 RJ_{34}	—	September 1, 2000	Socorro	LINEAR	AMO +1km	4.3 km	MPC · JPL
162567	2000 RW_{37}	—	September 3, 2000	Socorro	LINEAR	APO · PHA	340 m	MPC · JPL
162568	2000 RF_{38}	—	September 5, 2000	Kvistaberg	Uppsala-DLR Asteroid Survey	·	2.5 km	MPC · JPL
162569	2000 RT_{41}	—	September 3, 2000	Socorro	LINEAR	·	1.8 km	MPC · JPL
162570	2000 RA_{45}	—	September 3, 2000	Socorro	LINEAR	·	2.7 km	MPC · JPL
162571	2000 RE_{59}	—	September 7, 2000	Kitt Peak	Spacewatch	·	1.2 km	MPC · JPL
162572	2000 RT_{60}	—	September 6, 2000	Socorro	LINEAR	·	1.7 km	MPC · JPL
162573	2000 RT_{63}	—	September 3, 2000	Socorro	LINEAR	·	1.2 km	MPC · JPL
162574	2000 RT_{65}	—	September 1, 2000	Socorro	LINEAR	·	1.4 km	MPC · JPL
162575	2000 RY_{77}	—	September 2, 2000	Anderson Mesa	LONEOS	·	1.1 km	MPC · JPL
162576	2000 RR_{87}	—	September 2, 2000	Anderson Mesa	LONEOS	·	2.0 km	MPC · JPL
162577	2000 RR_{90}	—	September 3, 2000	Socorro	LINEAR	·	2.1 km	MPC · JPL
162578	2000 RJ_{92}	—	September 3, 2000	Socorro	LINEAR	·	2.3 km	MPC · JPL
162579	2000 SE_{5}	—	September 20, 2000	Socorro	LINEAR	PHO	1.9 km	MPC · JPL
162580	2000 SU_{6}	—	September 21, 2000	Socorro	LINEAR	·	1.5 km	MPC · JPL
162581	2000 SA_{10}	—	September 23, 2000	Socorro	LINEAR	AMO	660 m	MPC · JPL
162582	2000 SH_{12}	—	September 20, 2000	Socorro	LINEAR	·	1.6 km	MPC · JPL
162583	2000 SD_{14}	—	September 23, 2000	Socorro	LINEAR	·	1.7 km	MPC · JPL
162584	2000 SS_{29}	—	September 24, 2000	Socorro	LINEAR	NYS	1.2 km	MPC · JPL
162585	2000 SN_{30}	—	September 24, 2000	Socorro	LINEAR	·	1.3 km	MPC · JPL
162586	2000 SE_{31}	—	September 24, 2000	Socorro	LINEAR	·	1.6 km	MPC · JPL
162587	2000 SE_{34}	—	September 24, 2000	Socorro	LINEAR	·	2.1 km	MPC · JPL
162588	2000 ST_{34}	—	September 24, 2000	Socorro	LINEAR	NYS	1.7 km	MPC · JPL
162589	2000 SH_{35}	—	September 24, 2000	Socorro	LINEAR	·	1.7 km	MPC · JPL
162590	2000 SY_{38}	—	September 24, 2000	Socorro	LINEAR	·	1.0 km	MPC · JPL
162591	2000 SF_{40}	—	September 24, 2000	Socorro	LINEAR	(2076)	1.2 km	MPC · JPL
162592	2000 SO_{43}	—	September 24, 2000	Bergisch Gladbach	W. Bickel	·	1.9 km	MPC · JPL
162593	2000 SY_{47}	—	September 23, 2000	Socorro	LINEAR	·	1.8 km	MPC · JPL
162594	2000 SE_{61}	—	September 24, 2000	Socorro	LINEAR	·	1.6 km	MPC · JPL
162595	2000 SX_{62}	—	September 24, 2000	Socorro	LINEAR	·	1.9 km	MPC · JPL
162596	2000 SG_{64}	—	September 24, 2000	Socorro	LINEAR	·	1.3 km	MPC · JPL
162597	2000 SJ_{66}	—	September 24, 2000	Socorro	LINEAR	·	1.7 km	MPC · JPL
162598	2000 SP_{67}	—	September 24, 2000	Socorro	LINEAR	·	1.3 km	MPC · JPL
162599	2000 SR_{68}	—	September 24, 2000	Socorro	LINEAR	·	2.2 km	MPC · JPL
162600	2000 SV_{71}	—	September 24, 2000	Socorro	LINEAR	V	1.3 km	MPC · JPL

== 162601–162700 ==
back to top

Designation			Discovery			Properties		Ref
Permanent	Provisional	Named after	Date	Site	Discoverer(s)	Category	Diam.	Ref
162601	2000 SB_{72}	—	September 24, 2000	Socorro	LINEAR	·	1.9 km	MPC · JPL
162602	2000 SD_{73}	—	September 24, 2000	Socorro	LINEAR	·	1.7 km	MPC · JPL
162603	2000 SJ_{74}	—	September 24, 2000	Socorro	LINEAR	·	1.4 km	MPC · JPL
162604	2000 SM_{74}	—	September 24, 2000	Socorro	LINEAR	·	1.5 km	MPC · JPL
162605	2000 ST_{74}	—	September 24, 2000	Socorro	LINEAR	·	1.3 km	MPC · JPL
162606	2000 SR_{77}	—	September 24, 2000	Socorro	LINEAR	V	920 m	MPC · JPL
162607	2000 SV_{80}	—	September 24, 2000	Socorro	LINEAR	·	1.1 km	MPC · JPL
162608	2000 SD_{90}	—	September 22, 2000	Socorro	LINEAR	·	3.3 km	MPC · JPL
162609	2000 SH_{93}	—	September 23, 2000	Socorro	LINEAR	·	2.9 km	MPC · JPL
162610	2000 SF_{98}	—	September 23, 2000	Socorro	LINEAR	·	1.4 km	MPC · JPL
162611	2000 SN_{99}	—	September 23, 2000	Socorro	LINEAR	·	1.9 km	MPC · JPL
162612	2000 SX_{99}	—	September 23, 2000	Socorro	LINEAR	·	1.7 km	MPC · JPL
162613	2000 SE_{102}	—	September 24, 2000	Socorro	LINEAR	·	1.9 km	MPC · JPL
162614	2000 SJ_{103}	—	September 24, 2000	Socorro	LINEAR	NYS	2.0 km	MPC · JPL
162615	2000 SO_{103}	—	September 24, 2000	Socorro	LINEAR	·	2.3 km	MPC · JPL
162616	2000 SU_{104}	—	September 24, 2000	Socorro	LINEAR	NYS	1.5 km	MPC · JPL
162617	2000 SP_{107}	—	September 24, 2000	Socorro	LINEAR	·	1.2 km	MPC · JPL
162618	2000 SA_{111}	—	September 24, 2000	Socorro	LINEAR	·	2.3 km	MPC · JPL
162619	2000 SK_{114}	—	September 24, 2000	Socorro	LINEAR	·	2.0 km	MPC · JPL
162620	2000 SP_{114}	—	September 24, 2000	Socorro	LINEAR	·	1.6 km	MPC · JPL
162621	2000 SD_{118}	—	September 24, 2000	Socorro	LINEAR	·	1.5 km	MPC · JPL
162622	2000 SZ_{118}	—	September 24, 2000	Socorro	LINEAR	·	1.3 km	MPC · JPL
162623	2000 SH_{119}	—	September 24, 2000	Socorro	LINEAR	·	1.8 km	MPC · JPL
162624	2000 SP_{121}	—	September 24, 2000	Socorro	LINEAR	NYS	1.6 km	MPC · JPL
162625	2000 SR_{127}	—	September 24, 2000	Socorro	LINEAR	PHO	1.7 km	MPC · JPL
162626	2000 SH_{129}	—	September 26, 2000	Socorro	LINEAR	NYS	1.3 km	MPC · JPL
162627	2000 SR_{135}	—	September 23, 2000	Socorro	LINEAR	V	1.3 km	MPC · JPL
162628	2000 SO_{138}	—	September 23, 2000	Socorro	LINEAR	·	2.7 km	MPC · JPL
162629	2000 SU_{139}	—	September 23, 2000	Socorro	LINEAR	·	1.7 km	MPC · JPL
162630	2000 SC_{146}	—	September 24, 2000	Socorro	LINEAR	·	1.3 km	MPC · JPL
162631	2000 SN_{146}	—	September 24, 2000	Socorro	LINEAR	NYS	1.3 km	MPC · JPL
162632	2000 SA_{147}	—	September 24, 2000	Socorro	LINEAR	·	1.7 km	MPC · JPL
162633	2000 SQ_{151}	—	September 24, 2000	Socorro	LINEAR	·	2.2 km	MPC · JPL
162634	2000 SH_{158}	—	September 27, 2000	Socorro	LINEAR	·	3.0 km	MPC · JPL
162635	2000 SS_{164}	—	September 27, 2000	Socorro	LINEAR	AMO +1km	1.6 km	MPC · JPL
162636	2000 SG_{169}	—	September 23, 2000	Socorro	LINEAR	·	2.3 km	MPC · JPL
162637	2000 SM_{173}	—	September 28, 2000	Socorro	LINEAR	·	2.5 km	MPC · JPL
162638	2000 ST_{175}	—	September 28, 2000	Socorro	LINEAR	V	1.1 km	MPC · JPL
162639	2000 SV_{176}	—	September 28, 2000	Socorro	LINEAR	·	2.3 km	MPC · JPL
162640	2000 SM_{178}	—	September 28, 2000	Socorro	LINEAR	·	3.7 km	MPC · JPL
162641	2000 SB_{179}	—	September 28, 2000	Socorro	LINEAR	·	2.3 km	MPC · JPL
162642	2000 SC_{191}	—	September 24, 2000	Socorro	LINEAR	·	1.6 km	MPC · JPL
162643	2000 SA_{198}	—	September 24, 2000	Socorro	LINEAR	V	1.1 km	MPC · JPL
162644	2000 SZ_{204}	—	September 24, 2000	Socorro	LINEAR	·	2.8 km	MPC · JPL
162645	2000 SV_{207}	—	September 24, 2000	Socorro	LINEAR	·	2.1 km	MPC · JPL
162646	2000 SJ_{208}	—	September 24, 2000	Socorro	LINEAR	V	1.1 km	MPC · JPL
162647	2000 SM_{216}	—	September 26, 2000	Socorro	LINEAR	(2076)	1.5 km	MPC · JPL
162648	2000 ST_{218}	—	September 26, 2000	Socorro	LINEAR	·	2.0 km	MPC · JPL
162649	2000 SF_{220}	—	September 26, 2000	Socorro	LINEAR	V	1.2 km	MPC · JPL
162650	2000 SS_{222}	—	September 27, 2000	Socorro	LINEAR	·	2.0 km	MPC · JPL
162651	2000 SU_{228}	—	September 28, 2000	Socorro	LINEAR	·	3.4 km	MPC · JPL
162652	2000 SW_{229}	—	September 28, 2000	Socorro	LINEAR	NYS	1.8 km	MPC · JPL
162653	2000 SM_{230}	—	September 28, 2000	Socorro	LINEAR	MAS	1.2 km	MPC · JPL
162654	2000 SY_{232}	—	September 27, 2000	Socorro	LINEAR	PHO	4.7 km	MPC · JPL
162655	2000 SN_{235}	—	September 24, 2000	Socorro	LINEAR	V	1.1 km	MPC · JPL
162656	2000 SB_{242}	—	September 24, 2000	Socorro	LINEAR	·	1.1 km	MPC · JPL
162657	2000 SJ_{244}	—	September 24, 2000	Socorro	LINEAR	·	2.7 km	MPC · JPL
162658	2000 SK_{244}	—	September 24, 2000	Socorro	LINEAR	·	1.2 km	MPC · JPL
162659	2000 SJ_{247}	—	September 24, 2000	Socorro	LINEAR	·	1.4 km	MPC · JPL
162660	2000 SJ_{248}	—	September 24, 2000	Socorro	LINEAR	NYS	1.2 km	MPC · JPL
162661	2000 SG_{253}	—	September 24, 2000	Socorro	LINEAR	·	1.6 km	MPC · JPL
162662	2000 SF_{257}	—	September 24, 2000	Socorro	LINEAR	·	1.9 km	MPC · JPL
162663	2000 SS_{257}	—	September 24, 2000	Socorro	LINEAR	NYS	1.4 km	MPC · JPL
162664	2000 SE_{258}	—	September 24, 2000	Socorro	LINEAR	·	2.2 km	MPC · JPL
162665	2000 SZ_{259}	—	September 24, 2000	Socorro	LINEAR	·	2.5 km	MPC · JPL
162666	2000 SS_{263}	—	September 26, 2000	Socorro	LINEAR	·	1.8 km	MPC · JPL
162667	2000 SN_{267}	—	September 27, 2000	Socorro	LINEAR	·	1.8 km	MPC · JPL
162668	2000 SM_{268}	—	September 27, 2000	Socorro	LINEAR	NYS	1.4 km	MPC · JPL
162669	2000 SS_{277}	—	September 30, 2000	Socorro	LINEAR	·	1.6 km	MPC · JPL
162670	2000 SQ_{280}	—	September 30, 2000	Socorro	LINEAR	·	2.2 km	MPC · JPL
162671	2000 SV_{287}	—	September 26, 2000	Socorro	LINEAR	·	3.4 km	MPC · JPL
162672	2000 SR_{299}	—	September 28, 2000	Socorro	LINEAR	·	1.8 km	MPC · JPL
162673	2000 SF_{304}	—	September 30, 2000	Socorro	LINEAR	V	1.2 km	MPC · JPL
162674	2000 SF_{305}	—	September 30, 2000	Socorro	LINEAR	·	3.8 km	MPC · JPL
162675	2000 SW_{327}	—	September 30, 2000	Socorro	LINEAR	·	2.5 km	MPC · JPL
162676	2000 SO_{368}	—	September 24, 2000	Anderson Mesa	LONEOS	·	960 m	MPC · JPL
162677	2000 SA_{372}	—	September 24, 2000	Socorro	LINEAR	·	1.6 km	MPC · JPL
162678	2000 SE_{372}	—	September 30, 2000	Socorro	LINEAR	·	2.1 km	MPC · JPL
162679	2000 TK_{1}	—	October 1, 2000	Socorro	LINEAR	APO +1km	870 m	MPC · JPL
162680	2000 TY_{12}	—	October 1, 2000	Socorro	LINEAR	·	2.0 km	MPC · JPL
162681	2000 TU_{13}	—	October 1, 2000	Socorro	LINEAR	·	1.6 km	MPC · JPL
162682	2000 TL_{15}	—	October 1, 2000	Socorro	LINEAR	NYS	1.9 km	MPC · JPL
162683	2000 TP_{39}	—	October 1, 2000	Socorro	LINEAR	·	1.6 km	MPC · JPL
162684	2000 TC_{51}	—	October 1, 2000	Socorro	LINEAR	·	1.5 km	MPC · JPL
162685	2000 TK_{59}	—	October 2, 2000	Anderson Mesa	LONEOS	PHO	2.7 km	MPC · JPL
162686	2000 TO_{65}	—	October 1, 2000	Socorro	LINEAR	·	1.6 km	MPC · JPL
162687	2000 UH_{1}	—	October 18, 2000	Socorro	LINEAR	APO · PHA	630 m	MPC · JPL
162688	2000 UJ_{4}	—	October 24, 2000	Socorro	LINEAR	·	2.1 km	MPC · JPL
162689	2000 UN_{4}	—	October 24, 2000	Socorro	LINEAR	NYS	2.2 km	MPC · JPL
162690	2000 UK_{5}	—	October 24, 2000	Socorro	LINEAR	·	2.0 km	MPC · JPL
162691	2000 UN_{6}	—	October 24, 2000	Socorro	LINEAR	·	1.2 km	MPC · JPL
162692	2000 UJ_{8}	—	October 24, 2000	Socorro	LINEAR	·	1.6 km	MPC · JPL
162693	2000 UN_{10}	—	October 24, 2000	Socorro	LINEAR	(2076)	2.5 km	MPC · JPL
162694	2000 UH_{11}	—	October 25, 2000	Socorro	LINEAR	ATE	400 m	MPC · JPL
162695	2000 UL_{11}	—	October 25, 2000	Socorro	LINEAR	APO · PHA · critical	320 m	MPC · JPL
162696	2000 UK_{12}	—	October 24, 2000	Socorro	LINEAR	·	1.9 km	MPC · JPL
162697	2000 UO_{18}	—	October 25, 2000	Socorro	LINEAR	V	1.3 km	MPC · JPL
162698	2000 UN_{30}	—	October 29, 2000	Socorro	LINEAR	AMO	730 m	MPC · JPL
162699	2000 US_{30}	—	October 29, 2000	Ondřejov	P. Kušnirák, P. Pravec	·	1.2 km	MPC · JPL
162700	2000 UZ_{38}	—	October 24, 2000	Socorro	LINEAR	·	1.6 km	MPC · JPL

== 162701–162800 ==
back to top

Designation			Discovery			Properties		Ref
Permanent	Provisional	Named after	Date	Site	Discoverer(s)	Category	Diam.	Ref
162701	2000 UL_{42}	—	October 24, 2000	Socorro	LINEAR	MAS	1.3 km	MPC · JPL
162702	2000 UT_{43}	—	October 24, 2000	Socorro	LINEAR	·	2.2 km	MPC · JPL
162703	2000 UW_{51}	—	October 24, 2000	Socorro	LINEAR	·	1.7 km	MPC · JPL
162704	2000 UR_{63}	—	October 25, 2000	Socorro	LINEAR	·	2.1 km	MPC · JPL
162705	2000 UB_{66}	—	October 25, 2000	Socorro	LINEAR	3:2	8.4 km	MPC · JPL
162706	2000 UY_{68}	—	October 25, 2000	Socorro	LINEAR	·	2.5 km	MPC · JPL
162707	2000 UW_{69}	—	October 25, 2000	Socorro	LINEAR	·	1.9 km	MPC · JPL
162708	2000 UR_{70}	—	October 25, 2000	Socorro	LINEAR	·	2.2 km	MPC · JPL
162709	2000 UE_{71}	—	October 25, 2000	Socorro	LINEAR	·	2.6 km	MPC · JPL
162710	2000 UU_{72}	—	October 25, 2000	Socorro	LINEAR	·	2.1 km	MPC · JPL
162711	2000 UA_{78}	—	October 24, 2000	Socorro	LINEAR	·	2.7 km	MPC · JPL
162712	2000 UY_{85}	—	October 31, 2000	Socorro	LINEAR	NYS	1.4 km	MPC · JPL
162713	2000 UY_{95}	—	October 25, 2000	Socorro	LINEAR	·	2.5 km	MPC · JPL
162714	2000 UN_{96}	—	October 25, 2000	Socorro	LINEAR	·	2.3 km	MPC · JPL
162715	2000 UN_{99}	—	October 25, 2000	Socorro	LINEAR	·	1.9 km	MPC · JPL
162716	2000 UT_{100}	—	October 25, 2000	Socorro	LINEAR	·	2.5 km	MPC · JPL
162717	2000 UH_{102}	—	October 25, 2000	Socorro	LINEAR	·	3.0 km	MPC · JPL
162718	2000 UW_{103}	—	October 25, 2000	Socorro	LINEAR	·	2.7 km	MPC · JPL
162719	2000 UY_{103}	—	October 25, 2000	Socorro	LINEAR	·	2.0 km	MPC · JPL
162720	2000 UR_{110}	—	October 31, 2000	Socorro	LINEAR	·	2.5 km	MPC · JPL
162721	2000 UC_{114}	—	October 24, 2000	Socorro	LINEAR	·	2.1 km	MPC · JPL
162722	2000 VD	—	November 1, 2000	High Point	D. K. Chesney	ERI	3.3 km	MPC · JPL
162723	2000 VM_{2}	—	November 1, 2000	Socorro	LINEAR	APO +1km	1.0 km	MPC · JPL
162724	2000 VW_{2}	—	November 1, 2000	Desert Beaver	W. K. Y. Yeung	NYS	2.0 km	MPC · JPL
162725	2000 VT_{11}	—	November 1, 2000	Socorro	LINEAR	·	2.1 km	MPC · JPL
162726	2000 VR_{12}	—	November 1, 2000	Socorro	LINEAR	NYS	2.1 km	MPC · JPL
162727	2000 VO_{14}	—	November 1, 2000	Socorro	LINEAR	NYS	2.0 km	MPC · JPL
162728	2000 VY_{14}	—	November 1, 2000	Socorro	LINEAR	·	2.9 km	MPC · JPL
162729	2000 VU_{16}	—	November 1, 2000	Socorro	LINEAR	NYS	1.8 km	MPC · JPL
162730	2000 VO_{17}	—	November 1, 2000	Socorro	LINEAR	·	2.0 km	MPC · JPL
162731	2000 VG_{22}	—	November 1, 2000	Socorro	LINEAR	·	2.2 km	MPC · JPL
162732	2000 VK_{23}	—	November 1, 2000	Socorro	LINEAR	·	1.7 km	MPC · JPL
162733	2000 VH_{34}	—	November 1, 2000	Socorro	LINEAR	ERI	4.5 km	MPC · JPL
162734	2000 VH_{48}	—	November 2, 2000	Socorro	LINEAR	NYS	2.1 km	MPC · JPL
162735	2000 VL_{48}	—	November 2, 2000	Socorro	LINEAR	NYS	1.7 km	MPC · JPL
162736	2000 VD_{52}	—	November 3, 2000	Socorro	LINEAR	·	2.1 km	MPC · JPL
162737	2000 VP_{53}	—	November 3, 2000	Socorro	LINEAR	·	1.7 km	MPC · JPL
162738	2000 VG_{55}	—	November 3, 2000	Socorro	LINEAR	NYS	1.3 km	MPC · JPL
162739	2000 WS	—	November 16, 2000	Socorro	LINEAR	·	3.4 km	MPC · JPL
162740	2000 WF_{6}	—	November 16, 2000	Socorro	LINEAR	AMO	730 m	MPC · JPL
162741	2000 WG_{6}	—	November 18, 2000	Socorro	LINEAR	AMO +1km	3.9 km	MPC · JPL
162742	2000 WV_{14}	—	November 20, 2000	Socorro	LINEAR	·	1.9 km	MPC · JPL
162743	2000 WN_{15}	—	November 20, 2000	Socorro	LINEAR	ERI	3.1 km	MPC · JPL
162744	2000 WA_{18}	—	November 21, 2000	Socorro	LINEAR	NYS	3.1 km	MPC · JPL
162745	2000 WT_{18}	—	November 21, 2000	Socorro	LINEAR	·	3.8 km	MPC · JPL
162746	2000 WJ_{24}	—	November 20, 2000	Socorro	LINEAR	·	4.2 km	MPC · JPL
162747	2000 WH_{28}	—	November 23, 2000	Haleakala	NEAT	PHO	1.6 km	MPC · JPL
162748	2000 WG_{30}	—	November 20, 2000	Socorro	LINEAR	V	1.5 km	MPC · JPL
162749	2000 WF_{42}	—	November 21, 2000	Socorro	LINEAR	·	2.1 km	MPC · JPL
162750	2000 WY_{42}	—	November 21, 2000	Socorro	LINEAR	·	1.5 km	MPC · JPL
162751	2000 WZ_{46}	—	November 21, 2000	Socorro	LINEAR	NYS	1.6 km	MPC · JPL
162752	2000 WF_{48}	—	November 21, 2000	Socorro	LINEAR	·	2.7 km	MPC · JPL
162753	2000 WO_{55}	—	November 20, 2000	Socorro	LINEAR	·	3.1 km	MPC · JPL
162754	2000 WP_{56}	—	November 21, 2000	Socorro	LINEAR	V	1.3 km	MPC · JPL
162755 Spacesora	2000 WA_{68}	Spacesora	November 28, 2000	Kuma Kogen	A. Nakamura	·	3.5 km	MPC · JPL
162756	2000 WT_{82}	—	November 20, 2000	Socorro	LINEAR	·	1.7 km	MPC · JPL
162757	2000 WP_{87}	—	November 20, 2000	Socorro	LINEAR	·	1.8 km	MPC · JPL
162758	2000 WA_{96}	—	November 21, 2000	Socorro	LINEAR	·	2.0 km	MPC · JPL
162759	2000 WV_{101}	—	November 26, 2000	Socorro	LINEAR	·	2.3 km	MPC · JPL
162760	2000 WZ_{108}	—	November 20, 2000	Socorro	LINEAR	·	2.2 km	MPC · JPL
162761	2000 WG_{110}	—	November 20, 2000	Socorro	LINEAR	·	2.0 km	MPC · JPL
162762	2000 WN_{115}	—	November 20, 2000	Socorro	LINEAR	·	2.2 km	MPC · JPL
162763	2000 WY_{115}	—	November 20, 2000	Socorro	LINEAR	NYS	2.2 km	MPC · JPL
162764	2000 WJ_{117}	—	November 20, 2000	Socorro	LINEAR	·	2.4 km	MPC · JPL
162765	2000 WO_{120}	—	November 20, 2000	Socorro	LINEAR	PHO	1.6 km	MPC · JPL
162766	2000 WU_{127}	—	November 17, 2000	Kitt Peak	Spacewatch	NYS	2.0 km	MPC · JPL
162767	2000 WD_{135}	—	November 19, 2000	Socorro	LINEAR	·	3.8 km	MPC · JPL
162768	2000 WC_{138}	—	November 21, 2000	Socorro	LINEAR	MAS	1.4 km	MPC · JPL
162769	2000 WJ_{155}	—	November 30, 2000	Socorro	LINEAR	V	2.0 km	MPC · JPL
162770	2000 WS_{156}	—	November 30, 2000	Socorro	LINEAR	·	2.2 km	MPC · JPL
162771	2000 WP_{169}	—	November 26, 2000	Socorro	LINEAR	·	2.4 km	MPC · JPL
162772	2000 WX_{175}	—	November 26, 2000	Anderson Mesa	LONEOS	slow	4.4 km	MPC · JPL
162773	2000 WJ_{191}	—	November 19, 2000	Anderson Mesa	LONEOS	·	2.1 km	MPC · JPL
162774	2000 XV_{1}	—	December 3, 2000	Kitt Peak	Spacewatch	·	2.4 km	MPC · JPL
162775	2000 XG_{6}	—	December 1, 2000	Socorro	LINEAR	·	2.2 km	MPC · JPL
162776	2000 XO_{11}	—	December 4, 2000	Socorro	LINEAR	·	2.1 km	MPC · JPL
162777	2000 XV_{23}	—	December 4, 2000	Socorro	LINEAR	T_{j} (2.96) · 3:2	9.5 km	MPC · JPL
162778	2000 XJ_{26}	—	December 4, 2000	Socorro	LINEAR	PHO	1.7 km	MPC · JPL
162779	2000 XE_{30}	—	December 4, 2000	Socorro	LINEAR	·	4.6 km	MPC · JPL
162780	2000 XJ_{38}	—	December 5, 2000	Socorro	LINEAR	PHO	2.1 km	MPC · JPL
162781	2000 XL_{44}	—	December 6, 2000	Socorro	LINEAR	AMO +1km	910 m	MPC · JPL
162782	2000 XS_{47}	—	December 4, 2000	Socorro	LINEAR	·	1.9 km	MPC · JPL
162783	2000 YJ_{11}	—	December 19, 2000	Socorro	LINEAR	AMO · APO · PHA	230 m	MPC · JPL
162784	2000 YQ_{15}	—	December 22, 2000	Anderson Mesa	LONEOS	·	2.5 km	MPC · JPL
162785	2000 YA_{17}	—	December 22, 2000	Socorro	LINEAR	PHO	1.9 km	MPC · JPL
162786	2000 YT_{21}	—	December 24, 2000	Anderson Mesa	LONEOS	·	3.3 km	MPC · JPL
162787	2000 YB_{22}	—	December 29, 2000	Desert Beaver	W. K. Y. Yeung	(5)	5.3 km	MPC · JPL
162788	2000 YR_{31}	—	December 31, 2000	Kitt Peak	Spacewatch	·	2.3 km	MPC · JPL
162789	2000 YF_{33}	—	December 30, 2000	Socorro	LINEAR	·	2.4 km	MPC · JPL
162790	2000 YJ_{35}	—	December 30, 2000	Socorro	LINEAR	·	1.9 km	MPC · JPL
162791	2000 YC_{42}	—	December 30, 2000	Socorro	LINEAR	NYS	2.0 km	MPC · JPL
162792	2000 YX_{43}	—	December 30, 2000	Socorro	LINEAR	NYS	2.0 km	MPC · JPL
162793	2000 YY_{43}	—	December 30, 2000	Socorro	LINEAR	·	1.9 km	MPC · JPL
162794	2000 YC_{48}	—	December 30, 2000	Socorro	LINEAR	MAS	1.3 km	MPC · JPL
162795	2000 YF_{52}	—	December 30, 2000	Socorro	LINEAR	·	3.8 km	MPC · JPL
162796	2000 YA_{69}	—	December 30, 2000	Socorro	LINEAR	HIL · 3:2	11 km	MPC · JPL
162797	2000 YR_{74}	—	December 30, 2000	Socorro	LINEAR	·	2.3 km	MPC · JPL
162798	2000 YV_{79}	—	December 30, 2000	Socorro	LINEAR	·	2.2 km	MPC · JPL
162799	2000 YH_{80}	—	December 30, 2000	Socorro	LINEAR	NYS	2.3 km	MPC · JPL
162800	2000 YT_{82}	—	December 30, 2000	Socorro	LINEAR	NYS ·	4.4 km	MPC · JPL

== 162801–162900 ==
back to top

Designation			Discovery			Properties		Ref
Permanent	Provisional	Named after	Date	Site	Discoverer(s)	Category	Diam.	Ref
162801	2000 YV_{91}	—	December 30, 2000	Socorro	LINEAR	NYS	2.6 km	MPC · JPL
162802	2000 YK_{120}	—	December 19, 2000	Socorro	LINEAR	·	2.6 km	MPC · JPL
162803	2000 YG_{133}	—	December 30, 2000	Anderson Mesa	LONEOS	·	2.6 km	MPC · JPL
162804	2000 YV_{136}	—	December 23, 2000	Anderson Mesa	LONEOS	EUN	2.2 km	MPC · JPL
162805	2001 AR	—	January 2, 2001	Oizumi	T. Kobayashi	L4	20 km	MPC · JPL
162806	2001 AY_{10}	—	January 2, 2001	Socorro	LINEAR	V	1.4 km	MPC · JPL
162807	2001 AN_{12}	—	January 2, 2001	Socorro	LINEAR	·	2.9 km	MPC · JPL
162808	2001 AS_{12}	—	January 2, 2001	Socorro	LINEAR	·	3.6 km	MPC · JPL
162809	2001 AW_{34}	—	January 4, 2001	Socorro	LINEAR	(5)	2.1 km	MPC · JPL
162810	2001 AA_{37}	—	January 5, 2001	Socorro	LINEAR	·	2.8 km	MPC · JPL
162811	2001 AG_{51}	—	January 15, 2001	Kitt Peak	Spacewatch	L4	10 km	MPC · JPL
162812	2001 AV_{51}	—	January 15, 2001	Kitt Peak	Spacewatch	·	2.4 km	MPC · JPL
162813	2001 BE_{9}	—	January 19, 2001	Socorro	LINEAR	·	3.1 km	MPC · JPL
162814	2001 BT_{19}	—	January 19, 2001	Socorro	LINEAR	·	2.3 km	MPC · JPL
162815	2001 BU_{22}	—	January 20, 2001	Socorro	LINEAR	·	1.9 km	MPC · JPL
162816	2001 BL_{23}	—	January 20, 2001	Socorro	LINEAR	·	2.0 km	MPC · JPL
162817	2001 BX_{28}	—	January 20, 2001	Socorro	LINEAR	·	2.3 km	MPC · JPL
162818	2001 BF_{33}	—	January 20, 2001	Socorro	LINEAR	·	2.8 km	MPC · JPL
162819	2001 BD_{34}	—	January 20, 2001	Socorro	LINEAR	PHO	2.3 km	MPC · JPL
162820	2001 BK_{36}	—	January 19, 2001	Socorro	LINEAR	ADE	4.9 km	MPC · JPL
162821	2001 BV_{42}	—	January 19, 2001	Socorro	LINEAR	·	2.8 km	MPC · JPL
162822	2001 BD_{49}	—	January 21, 2001	Socorro	LINEAR	L4	18 km	MPC · JPL
162823	2001 BV_{58}	—	January 21, 2001	Socorro	LINEAR	·	4.1 km	MPC · JPL
162824	2001 BK_{60}	—	January 29, 2001	Oizumi	T. Kobayashi	H	1.8 km	MPC · JPL
162825	2001 BO_{61}	—	January 26, 2001	Socorro	LINEAR	APO +1km · PHA	900 m	MPC · JPL
162826	2001 BE_{64}	—	January 29, 2001	Socorro	LINEAR	·	4.9 km	MPC · JPL
162827	2001 BT_{76}	—	January 26, 2001	Kitt Peak	Spacewatch	·	2.5 km	MPC · JPL
162828	2001 CG	—	February 1, 2001	Višnjan Observatory	K. Korlević	·	3.2 km	MPC · JPL
162829	2001 CX_{1}	—	February 1, 2001	Socorro	LINEAR	·	4.1 km	MPC · JPL
162830	2001 CK_{2}	—	February 1, 2001	Socorro	LINEAR	NYS	2.7 km	MPC · JPL
162831	2001 CV_{4}	—	February 1, 2001	Socorro	LINEAR	(5)	2.8 km	MPC · JPL
162832	2001 CO_{6}	—	February 1, 2001	Socorro	LINEAR	MAS	1.6 km	MPC · JPL
162833	2001 CS_{15}	—	February 1, 2001	Socorro	LINEAR	HNS	1.9 km	MPC · JPL
162834	2001 CO_{17}	—	February 1, 2001	Socorro	LINEAR	·	2.3 km	MPC · JPL
162835	2001 CA_{19}	—	February 2, 2001	Socorro	LINEAR	(21344)	3.0 km	MPC · JPL
162836	2001 CY_{22}	—	February 1, 2001	Anderson Mesa	LONEOS	·	3.4 km	MPC · JPL
162837	2001 CB_{30}	—	February 2, 2001	Anderson Mesa	LONEOS	·	3.0 km	MPC · JPL
162838	2001 CC_{36}	—	February 15, 2001	Oizumi	T. Kobayashi	·	2.6 km	MPC · JPL
162839	2001 CX_{36}	—	February 13, 2001	Kitt Peak	Spacewatch	EUN	1.8 km	MPC · JPL
162840	2001 DE_{3}	—	February 16, 2001	Socorro	LINEAR	H	860 m	MPC · JPL
162841	2001 DF_{4}	—	February 16, 2001	Socorro	LINEAR	·	2.3 km	MPC · JPL
162842	2001 DQ_{7}	—	February 16, 2001	Oizumi	T. Kobayashi	·	2.1 km	MPC · JPL
162843	2001 DN_{13}	—	February 19, 2001	Oizumi	T. Kobayashi	·	3.5 km	MPC · JPL
162844	2001 DV_{27}	—	February 17, 2001	Socorro	LINEAR	HNS	1.7 km	MPC · JPL
162845	2001 DZ_{27}	—	February 17, 2001	Socorro	LINEAR	·	2.5 km	MPC · JPL
162846	2001 DK_{28}	—	February 17, 2001	Socorro	LINEAR	·	2.1 km	MPC · JPL
162847	2001 DA_{31}	—	February 17, 2001	Socorro	LINEAR	·	3.5 km	MPC · JPL
162848	2001 DV_{31}	—	February 17, 2001	Socorro	LINEAR	·	3.9 km	MPC · JPL
162849	2001 DN_{32}	—	February 17, 2001	Socorro	LINEAR	·	2.1 km	MPC · JPL
162850	2001 DV_{34}	—	February 19, 2001	Socorro	LINEAR	·	2.5 km	MPC · JPL
162851	2001 DF_{39}	—	February 19, 2001	Socorro	LINEAR	L4	14 km	MPC · JPL
162852	2001 DJ_{43}	—	February 19, 2001	Socorro	LINEAR	·	2.7 km	MPC · JPL
162853	2001 DO_{43}	—	February 19, 2001	Socorro	LINEAR	·	2.1 km	MPC · JPL
162854	2001 DE_{47}	—	February 19, 2001	Socorro	LINEAR	AMO	530 m	MPC · JPL
162855	2001 DU_{50}	—	February 16, 2001	Socorro	LINEAR	·	2.2 km	MPC · JPL
162856	2001 DN_{53}	—	February 20, 2001	Socorro	LINEAR	·	6.6 km	MPC · JPL
162857	2001 DP_{70}	—	February 19, 2001	Socorro	LINEAR	·	3.1 km	MPC · JPL
162858	2001 DZ_{71}	—	February 19, 2001	Socorro	LINEAR	·	3.3 km	MPC · JPL
162859	2001 DW_{76}	—	February 21, 2001	Socorro	LINEAR	·	1.9 km	MPC · JPL
162860	2001 DF_{102}	—	February 16, 2001	Socorro	LINEAR	MAR	1.6 km	MPC · JPL
162861	2001 DY_{103}	—	February 16, 2001	Anderson Mesa	LONEOS	L4	23 km	MPC · JPL
162862	2001 DQ_{104}	—	February 16, 2001	Anderson Mesa	LONEOS	·	1.8 km	MPC · JPL
162863	2001 EX_{4}	—	March 2, 2001	Anderson Mesa	LONEOS	GEF	2.3 km	MPC · JPL
162864	2001 EZ_{4}	—	March 2, 2001	Anderson Mesa	LONEOS	·	2.4 km	MPC · JPL
162865	2001 EP_{8}	—	March 2, 2001	Anderson Mesa	LONEOS	·	2.2 km	MPC · JPL
162866	2001 EB_{13}	—	March 4, 2001	Socorro	LINEAR	H	1.0 km	MPC · JPL
162867	2001 EA_{19}	—	March 14, 2001	Kitt Peak	Spacewatch	EUN	2.5 km	MPC · JPL
162868	2001 ET_{19}	—	March 15, 2001	Kitt Peak	Spacewatch	·	3.5 km	MPC · JPL
162869	2001 EF_{20}	—	March 15, 2001	Anderson Mesa	LONEOS	NEM	2.9 km	MPC · JPL
162870	2001 EY_{23}	—	March 15, 2001	Haleakala	NEAT	·	4.0 km	MPC · JPL
162871	2001 EO_{26}	—	March 2, 2001	Anderson Mesa	LONEOS	·	2.6 km	MPC · JPL
162872	2001 FP_{3}	—	March 18, 2001	Socorro	LINEAR	GEF	2.6 km	MPC · JPL
162873	2001 FB_{7}	—	March 18, 2001	Socorro	LINEAR	AMO	500 m	MPC · JPL
162874	2001 FV_{12}	—	March 19, 2001	Anderson Mesa	LONEOS	·	2.7 km	MPC · JPL
162875	2001 FD_{20}	—	March 19, 2001	Anderson Mesa	LONEOS	GEF	2.9 km	MPC · JPL
162876	2001 FC_{24}	—	March 19, 2001	Socorro	LINEAR	H	900 m	MPC · JPL
162877	2001 FB_{28}	—	March 19, 2001	Socorro	LINEAR	·	4.9 km	MPC · JPL
162878	2001 FU_{33}	—	March 18, 2001	Socorro	LINEAR	·	3.7 km	MPC · JPL
162879	2001 FM_{42}	—	March 18, 2001	Socorro	LINEAR	GEF	1.9 km	MPC · JPL
162880	2001 FS_{51}	—	March 18, 2001	Socorro	LINEAR	EUN	2.1 km	MPC · JPL
162881	2001 FT_{51}	—	March 18, 2001	Socorro	LINEAR	·	4.2 km	MPC · JPL
162882	2001 FD_{58}	—	March 24, 2001	Socorro	LINEAR	APO · PHA	630 m	MPC · JPL
162883	2001 FM_{68}	—	March 19, 2001	Socorro	LINEAR	·	5.4 km	MPC · JPL
162884	2001 FR_{73}	—	March 19, 2001	Socorro	LINEAR	·	1.8 km	MPC · JPL
162885	2001 FW_{84}	—	March 26, 2001	Kitt Peak	Spacewatch	·	2.2 km	MPC · JPL
162886	2001 FT_{88}	—	March 26, 2001	Kitt Peak	Spacewatch	AGN	1.7 km	MPC · JPL
162887	2001 FD_{93}	—	March 16, 2001	Socorro	LINEAR	·	2.6 km	MPC · JPL
162888	2001 FJ_{106}	—	March 18, 2001	Anderson Mesa	LONEOS	GAL	2.9 km	MPC · JPL
162889	2001 FT_{116}	—	March 19, 2001	Socorro	LINEAR	·	2.0 km	MPC · JPL
162890	2001 FO_{138}	—	March 21, 2001	Haleakala	NEAT	(12739)	2.3 km	MPC · JPL
162891	2001 FS_{169}	—	March 23, 2001	Cima Ekar	ADAS	·	2.1 km	MPC · JPL
162892	2001 GW_{1}	—	April 13, 2001	Kitt Peak	Spacewatch	·	3.2 km	MPC · JPL
162893	2001 GK_{3}	—	April 14, 2001	Socorro	LINEAR	H	1.1 km	MPC · JPL
162894	2001 HD	—	April 16, 2001	Kitt Peak	Spacewatch	·	4.1 km	MPC · JPL
162895	2001 HR_{4}	—	April 16, 2001	Socorro	LINEAR	·	3.7 km	MPC · JPL
162896	2001 HG_{11}	—	April 18, 2001	Socorro	LINEAR	slow	4.6 km	MPC · JPL
162897	2001 HB_{15}	—	April 23, 2001	Kitt Peak	Spacewatch	·	3.3 km	MPC · JPL
162898	2001 HK_{22}	—	April 24, 2001	Haleakala	NEAT	H	1.2 km	MPC · JPL
162899	2001 HB_{27}	—	April 27, 2001	Desert Beaver	W. K. Y. Yeung	·	2.5 km	MPC · JPL
162900	2001 HG_{31}	—	April 24, 2001	Haleakala	NEAT	AMO +1km	2.3 km	MPC · JPL

== 162901–163000 ==
back to top

Designation			Discovery			Properties		Ref
Permanent	Provisional	Named after	Date	Site	Discoverer(s)	Category	Diam.	Ref
162901	2001 HF_{46}	—	April 17, 2001	Anderson Mesa	LONEOS	·	1.9 km	MPC · JPL
162902	2001 HM_{62}	—	April 26, 2001	Anderson Mesa	LONEOS	H	1.0 km	MPC · JPL
162903	2001 JV_{2}	—	May 15, 2001	Socorro	LINEAR	APO +1km	1.1 km	MPC · JPL
162904	2001 JV_{10}	—	May 15, 2001	Kitt Peak	Spacewatch	·	3.0 km	MPC · JPL
162905	2001 KV_{5}	—	May 17, 2001	Socorro	LINEAR	·	2.6 km	MPC · JPL
162906	2001 KY_{10}	—	May 18, 2001	Socorro	LINEAR	·	5.3 km	MPC · JPL
162907	2001 KJ_{21}	—	May 23, 2001	Socorro	LINEAR	H	1.1 km	MPC · JPL
162908	2001 KD_{39}	—	May 22, 2001	Socorro	LINEAR	·	4.8 km	MPC · JPL
162909	2001 KQ_{41}	—	May 24, 2001	Prescott	P. G. Comba	·	4.1 km	MPC · JPL
162910	2001 KW_{52}	—	May 18, 2001	Anderson Mesa	LONEOS	·	4.5 km	MPC · JPL
162911	2001 LL_{5}	—	June 6, 2001	Palomar	NEAT	APO	480 m	MPC · JPL
162912	2001 MD_{12}	—	June 21, 2001	Palomar	NEAT	slow	7.2 km	MPC · JPL
162913	2001 MT_{18}	—	June 28, 2001	Anderson Mesa	LONEOS	APO	720 m	MPC · JPL
162914	2001 NL_{7}	—	July 13, 2001	Palomar	NEAT	·	9.5 km	MPC · JPL
162915	2001 NF_{19}	—	July 14, 2001	Palomar	NEAT	·	4.2 km	MPC · JPL
162916	2001 NJ_{20}	—	July 13, 2001	Palomar	NEAT	EUP	7.7 km	MPC · JPL
162917	2001 OW_{1}	—	July 18, 2001	Palomar	NEAT	·	6.8 km	MPC · JPL
162918	2001 OX_{5}	—	July 17, 2001	Anderson Mesa	LONEOS	·	8.7 km	MPC · JPL
162919	2001 OM_{6}	—	July 17, 2001	Anderson Mesa	LONEOS	·	6.8 km	MPC · JPL
162920	2001 OF_{9}	—	July 20, 2001	Anderson Mesa	LONEOS	·	6.7 km	MPC · JPL
162921	2001 OL_{11}	—	July 17, 2001	Palomar	NEAT	slow	6.9 km	MPC · JPL
162922	2001 OY_{13}	—	July 19, 2001	Anderson Mesa	LONEOS	APO · PHA · critical	230 m	MPC · JPL
162923	2001 OH_{24}	—	July 16, 2001	Anderson Mesa	LONEOS	·	8.0 km	MPC · JPL
162924	2001 OS_{27}	—	July 18, 2001	Palomar	NEAT	·	5.2 km	MPC · JPL
162925	2001 OG_{33}	—	July 19, 2001	Palomar	NEAT	·	8.9 km	MPC · JPL
162926	2001 OB_{36}	—	July 24, 2001	Palomar	NEAT	T_{j} (2.64) · AMO +1km · critical	1.3 km	MPC · JPL
162927	2001 OF_{49}	—	July 17, 2001	Anderson Mesa	LONEOS	THB	4.9 km	MPC · JPL
162928	2001 ON_{76}	—	July 22, 2001	Palomar	NEAT	·	5.1 km	MPC · JPL
162929	2001 OO_{80}	—	July 30, 2001	Palomar	NEAT	·	5.1 km	MPC · JPL
162930	2001 OA_{82}	—	July 26, 2001	Haleakala	NEAT	·	8.6 km	MPC · JPL
162931	2001 OP_{82}	—	July 27, 2001	Palomar	NEAT	THM	3.6 km	MPC · JPL
162932	2001 OP_{84}	—	July 18, 2001	Kitt Peak	Spacewatch	·	6.8 km	MPC · JPL
162933	2001 OR_{88}	—	July 21, 2001	Haleakala	NEAT	·	4.5 km	MPC · JPL
162934	2001 OD_{93}	—	July 24, 2001	Palomar	NEAT	·	6.9 km	MPC · JPL
162935	2001 OO_{98}	—	July 26, 2001	Palomar	NEAT	LIX	6.5 km	MPC · JPL
162936	2001 OD_{102}	—	July 28, 2001	Haleakala	NEAT	·	8.4 km	MPC · JPL
162937 Prêtre	2001 PQ_{9}	Prêtre	August 12, 2001	Vicques	M. Ory	·	3.2 km	MPC · JPL
162938	2001 PC_{11}	—	August 8, 2001	Haleakala	NEAT	·	4.6 km	MPC · JPL
162939	2001 PA_{12}	—	August 11, 2001	Palomar	NEAT	LIX	7.7 km	MPC · JPL
162940	2001 PY_{20}	—	August 10, 2001	Haleakala	NEAT	·	6.9 km	MPC · JPL
162941	2001 PM_{25}	—	August 11, 2001	Haleakala	NEAT	EUP	6.1 km	MPC · JPL
162942	2001 PK_{43}	—	August 13, 2001	Haleakala	NEAT	·	7.4 km	MPC · JPL
162943	2001 QZ_{18}	—	August 16, 2001	Socorro	LINEAR	·	5.9 km	MPC · JPL
162944	2001 QH_{34}	—	August 16, 2001	Socorro	LINEAR	·	6.4 km	MPC · JPL
162945	2001 QO_{35}	—	August 16, 2001	Socorro	LINEAR	·	5.5 km	MPC · JPL
162946	2001 QS_{38}	—	August 16, 2001	Socorro	LINEAR	·	7.6 km	MPC · JPL
162947	2001 QY_{38}	—	August 16, 2001	Socorro	LINEAR	·	5.4 km	MPC · JPL
162948	2001 QD_{43}	—	August 16, 2001	Socorro	LINEAR	THM	6.0 km	MPC · JPL
162949	2001 QW_{44}	—	August 16, 2001	Socorro	LINEAR	EOS	5.8 km	MPC · JPL
162950	2001 QK_{47}	—	August 16, 2001	Socorro	LINEAR	·	5.4 km	MPC · JPL
162951	2001 QU_{55}	—	August 16, 2001	Socorro	LINEAR	·	4.5 km	MPC · JPL
162952	2001 QC_{62}	—	August 16, 2001	Socorro	LINEAR	HYG	5.2 km	MPC · JPL
162953	2001 QY_{63}	—	August 16, 2001	Socorro	LINEAR	·	7.6 km	MPC · JPL
162954	2001 QB_{93}	—	August 22, 2001	Socorro	LINEAR	·	7.6 km	MPC · JPL
162955	2001 QA_{106}	—	August 18, 2001	Anderson Mesa	LONEOS	·	7.6 km	MPC · JPL
162956	2001 QF_{119}	—	August 17, 2001	Socorro	LINEAR	·	5.0 km	MPC · JPL
162957	2001 QU_{122}	—	August 19, 2001	Socorro	LINEAR	·	5.7 km	MPC · JPL
162958	2001 QL_{132}	—	August 20, 2001	Socorro	LINEAR	·	5.5 km	MPC · JPL
162959	2001 QW_{143}	—	August 21, 2001	Kitt Peak	Spacewatch	·	3.9 km	MPC · JPL
162960	2001 QX_{160}	—	August 23, 2001	Anderson Mesa	LONEOS	·	6.6 km	MPC · JPL
162961	2001 QC_{165}	—	August 22, 2001	Haleakala	NEAT	·	5.0 km	MPC · JPL
162962	2001 QT_{171}	—	August 25, 2001	Socorro	LINEAR	·	4.6 km	MPC · JPL
162963	2001 QZ_{172}	—	August 25, 2001	Socorro	LINEAR	VER	7.7 km	MPC · JPL
162964	2001 QM_{206}	—	August 23, 2001	Anderson Mesa	LONEOS	·	4.7 km	MPC · JPL
162965	2001 QS_{207}	—	August 23, 2001	Anderson Mesa	LONEOS	EOS	3.6 km	MPC · JPL
162966	2001 QR_{208}	—	August 23, 2001	Anderson Mesa	LONEOS	·	4.3 km	MPC · JPL
162967	2001 QK_{219}	—	August 23, 2001	Kitt Peak	Spacewatch	·	6.1 km	MPC · JPL
162968	2001 QT_{226}	—	August 24, 2001	Anderson Mesa	LONEOS	·	5.8 km	MPC · JPL
162969	2001 QT_{232}	—	August 24, 2001	Socorro	LINEAR	CYB	5.3 km	MPC · JPL
162970	2001 QK_{240}	—	August 24, 2001	Socorro	LINEAR	·	4.5 km	MPC · JPL
162971	2001 QU_{256}	—	August 25, 2001	Socorro	LINEAR	·	6.6 km	MPC · JPL
162972	2001 QL_{272}	—	August 19, 2001	Socorro	LINEAR	·	4.6 km	MPC · JPL
162973	2001 QV_{273}	—	August 19, 2001	Socorro	LINEAR	·	5.6 km	MPC · JPL
162974	2001 QC_{276}	—	August 19, 2001	Socorro	LINEAR	slow	6.8 km	MPC · JPL
162975	2001 QS_{279}	—	August 19, 2001	Socorro	LINEAR	·	7.0 km	MPC · JPL
162976	2001 QJ_{288}	—	August 17, 2001	Palomar	NEAT	·	9.3 km	MPC · JPL
162977	2001 QY_{294}	—	August 24, 2001	Socorro	LINEAR	·	5.8 km	MPC · JPL
162978 Helenhart	2001 QD_{333}	Helenhart	August 19, 2001	Cerro Tololo	M. W. Buie	·	5.2 km	MPC · JPL
162979	2001 RA_{12}	—	September 10, 2001	Socorro	LINEAR	APO +1km · PHA	780 m	MPC · JPL
162980	2001 RR_{17}	—	September 11, 2001	Socorro	LINEAR	APO +1km	790 m	MPC · JPL
162981	2001 RQ_{30}	—	September 7, 2001	Socorro	LINEAR	THM	6.1 km	MPC · JPL
162982	2001 RM_{50}	—	September 10, 2001	Socorro	LINEAR	EOS	2.8 km	MPC · JPL
162983	2001 RP_{53}	—	September 12, 2001	Socorro	LINEAR	·	5.6 km	MPC · JPL
162984	2001 RM_{104}	—	September 12, 2001	Socorro	LINEAR	·	3.5 km	MPC · JPL
162985	2001 RH_{110}	—	September 12, 2001	Socorro	LINEAR	HYG	4.7 km	MPC · JPL
162986	2001 RC_{113}	—	September 12, 2001	Socorro	LINEAR	EOS	3.6 km	MPC · JPL
162987	2001 RC_{125}	—	September 12, 2001	Socorro	LINEAR	THM	6.4 km	MPC · JPL
162988	2001 RN_{128}	—	September 12, 2001	Socorro	LINEAR	·	6.4 km	MPC · JPL
162989	2001 SJ_{35}	—	September 16, 2001	Socorro	LINEAR	HYG	4.7 km	MPC · JPL
162990	2001 SR_{54}	—	September 16, 2001	Socorro	LINEAR	·	8.2 km	MPC · JPL
162991	2001 SY_{69}	—	September 17, 2001	Socorro	LINEAR	·	2.0 km	MPC · JPL
162992	2001 SJ_{73}	—	September 18, 2001	Goodricke-Pigott	R. A. Tucker	·	7.1 km	MPC · JPL
162993	2001 SY_{88}	—	September 20, 2001	Socorro	LINEAR	·	4.4 km	MPC · JPL
162994	2001 SN_{92}	—	September 20, 2001	Socorro	LINEAR	(21885)	5.3 km	MPC · JPL
162995	2001 SN_{95}	—	September 20, 2001	Socorro	LINEAR	·	1.4 km	MPC · JPL
162996	2001 SQ_{98}	—	September 20, 2001	Socorro	LINEAR	·	3.8 km	MPC · JPL
162997	2001 SP_{111}	—	September 20, 2001	Socorro	LINEAR	·	7.3 km	MPC · JPL
162998	2001 SK_{162}	—	September 17, 2001	Socorro	LINEAR	AMO · APO +1km · PHA	880 m	MPC · JPL
162999	2001 SW_{167}	—	September 19, 2001	Socorro	LINEAR	·	5.5 km	MPC · JPL
163000	2001 SW_{169}	—	September 19, 2001	Socorro	LINEAR	AMO	500 m	MPC · JPL

back to top

== See also ==
- Meanings of minor-planet names: 162001–163000
