= (162421) 2000 ET70 =

Near-Earth asteroid

(162421) 2000 ET_{70}
Discovery
- Discovered by: LINEAR
- Discovery site: Lincoln Lab's ETS
- Discovery date: 8 March 2000

Designations
- Minor planet category: NEO · PHA · Aten

Orbital characteristics
- Epoch 4 September 2017 (JD 2458000.5)
- Uncertainty parameter 0
- Observation arc: 37.17 yr (13,575 d)
- Aphelion: 1.0638 AU
- Perihelion: 0.8295 AU
- Semi-major axis: 0.9467 AU
- Eccentricity: 0.1237
- Orbital period (sidereal): 0.92 yr (336 days)
- Mean anomaly: 129.36°
- Mean motion: 1° 4^{m} 12.36^{s} / day
- Inclination: 22.323°
- Longitude of ascending node: 331.16°
- Argument of perihelion: 46.103°
- Earth MOID: 0.0316 AU · 12.3 LD

Physical characteristics
- Dimensions: 2.90+0.34 −0.24 × 2.24+0.36 −0.23 × 1.50+0.47 −0.29 km
- Mean diameter: 2.10±0.07 km
- Surface area: 15.3±1.0 km^{2}
- Volume: 4.82±0.50 km^{3}
- Synodic rotation period: 8.9444+0.0100 −0.0081 h
- Pole ecliptic longitude: 52° ± 9°
- Pole ecliptic latitude: −60° ± 6°
- Geometric albedo: 0.018±0.002; 0.09±0.04
- Spectral type: Xk
- Absolute magnitude (H): 18.0 · 18.2 · 16.6 ± 0.5

(162421) 2000 ET_{70} is a dark, elongated and oblate asteroid, classified as a near-Earth object and potentially hazardous asteroid of the Aten group, approximately 2.2 kilometers in diameter. It was discovered on 8 March 2000, by astronomers of the Lincoln Near-Earth Asteroid Research at the Lincoln Laboratory's Experimental Test Site near Socorro, New Mexico. The body has a notably low albedo, and its shape resembles that of a "clenched fist".

== Orbit and classification ==
2000 ET_{70} orbits the Sun at a distance of 0.8–1.1 AU once every 11 months (336 days; semi-major axis of 0.95 AU). Its orbit has an eccentricity of 0.12 and an inclination of 22° with respect to the ecliptic. A first precovery was found in the Digitized Sky Survey from images taken at ESO's La Silla Observatory in February 1977. The body's observation arc begins with its official discovery observation at Socorro in March 2000.

=== Close approaches ===
The asteroid has an Earth minimum orbital intersection distance of 0.0316 AU (4,730,000 km) which translates into 12.3 lunar distances. In February 2012, it was observed by radar during a close approach (0.045 AU) at the Arecibo and Goldstone observatories. The observations allowed to model the body's spin period and rotation, as well as its shape (see below).

== Physical characteristics ==
2000 ET_{70} has been characterized as a Xk-subtype, which transitions between the X- and K-type asteroids.

=== Rotation period, pole, and shape ===
During its close approach in February 2012, a rotational lightcurve of 2000 ET_{70} was obtained from photometric observations by a collaboration of astronomers from Uruguay, Australia, and the United States. Analysis of the lightcurve gave a period of 8.947 hours with a brightness amplitude of 0.60 magnitude (U=3-). (Note: Lightcurve plot of (162421) 2000 ET_{70}, by Julian Oey (2012) at Blue Mountains Observatory (Kingsgrove Observatory; E19). Lightcurve period 8.970±0.004 hours. Note: additional photometric data from other observatories gave a refined period of 8.947 hours. Summary figures at the LCDB)

Radar observations at Arecibo and Goldstone showed that the asteroid spins in a retrograde manner with a rotation period of 8.96 hours. It is likely a principal axis rotator, i.e., not tumbling. Shape modelling by two independent teams gave sidereal periods of 8.96 and 8.944 hours, respectively. A spin axis of (80.0°, −50.0°) in ecliptic coordinates was determined. The observations also revealed that the asteroid has an elongated oblate shape, resembling a "clenched fist". Its surface exhibits multiple kilometer scale ridges and concavities.

=== Diameter and albedo ===
According to shape modeling of radar observations, the asteroid's overall dimensions are 2.6×2.2×2.1 kilometers. Based on an absolute magnitude of 18.2, this results in a notably low albedo of 0.018. More recent modeling combining radar, photometric, and infrared data gave and even more elongated shape of 2.9×2.2×1.5 kilometers. These authors argue that the absolute magnitude value is incorrect and report a geometric albedo of 0.09.

2000 ET_{70}'s mean-diameter measures between 2.0 and 2.26 kilometers and its surface has an albedo between 0.018 and 0.09. The Collaborative Asteroid Lightcurve Link adopts an albedo of 0.018 and a diameter of 2.26 kilometers based on an absolute magnitude of 18.2.

== Numbering and naming ==
This minor planet was numbered on 26 September 2007, after its orbital parameters had been sufficiently determined (M.P.C. 60670). As of 2018, it has not been named.
