= Meanings of minor-planet names: 163001–164000 =

As minor planet discoveries are confirmed, they are given a permanent number by the IAU's Minor Planet Center (MPC), and the discoverers can then submit names for them, following the IAU's naming conventions. The list below concerns those minor planets in the specified number-range that have received names, and explains the meanings of those names.

Official naming citations of newly named small Solar System bodies are approved and published in a bulletin by IAU's Working Group for Small Bodies Nomenclature (WGSBN). Before May 2021, citations were published in MPC's Minor Planet Circulars for many decades. Recent citations can also be found on the JPL Small-Body Database (SBDB). Until his death in 2016, German astronomer Lutz D. Schmadel compiled these citations into the Dictionary of Minor Planet Names (DMP) and regularly updated the collection.

Based on Paul Herget's The Names of the Minor Planets, Schmadel also researched the unclear origin of numerous asteroids, most of which had been named prior to World War II. This article incorporates text from this source, which is in the public domain: SBDB New namings may only be added to this list below after official publication as the preannouncement of names is condemned. The WGSBN publishes a comprehensive guideline for the naming rules of non-cometary small Solar System bodies.

== 163001–163100 ==
Named minor planet	Provisional	This minor planet was named for...	Ref · Catalog
There are no named minor planets in this number range

== 163101–163200 ==
back to top

Named minor planet	Provisional	This minor planet was named for...	Ref · Catalog
163119 Timmckay	2002 AO_{208}	Tim McKay (born 1964), American astronomer with the Sloan Digital Sky Survey	JPL · 163119
163153 Takuyaonishi	2002 CO_{116}	Takuya Onishi (born 1964), a Japanese astronaut selected by JAXA in 2009. He worked aboard the International Space Station in 2016 and 2025.	JPL · 163153

== 163201–163300 ==
back to top

Named minor planet	Provisional	This minor planet was named for...	Ref · Catalog
163244 Matthewhill	2002 FU_{18}	Matthew E. Hill (born 1971) is a senior scientist at the Johns Hopkins University Applied Physics Laboratory. He served as a Co-Investigator for a High Energy Charged Particles Spectrometer aboard the New Horizons Mission to Pluto.	JPL · 163244
163255 Adrianhill	2002 GT_{27}	Adrian Hill (born 1964) is a software engineer at the Johns Hopkins University Applied Physics Laboratory, and served as a Fault Protection and Autonomy Lead for the New Horizons Mission to Pluto.	JPL · 163255

== 163301–163400 ==
back to top

Named minor planet	Provisional	This minor planet was named for...	Ref · Catalog
There are no named minor planets in this number range

== 163401–163500 ==
back to top

Named minor planet	Provisional	This minor planet was named for...	Ref · Catalog
163470 Kenwallis	2002 RQ_{181}	Ken Wallis (1916–2013), a British aviator and engineer.	JPL · 163470

== 163501–163600 ==
back to top

Named minor planet	Provisional	This minor planet was named for...	Ref · Catalog
There are no named minor planets in this number range

== 163601–163700 ==
back to top

Named minor planet	Provisional	This minor planet was named for...	Ref · Catalog
163623 Miknaitis	2002 TR_{346}	Gajus Miknaitis (born 1976), American astrophysicist with the Sloan Digital Sky Survey	JPL · 163623
163624 Moorthy	2002 TD_{366}	Bhasker Moorthy (born 1978), American astronomer with the Sloan Digital Sky Survey	JPL · 163624
163625 Munn	2002 TU_{367}	Jeff Munn (born 1961), American astronomer with the Sloan Digital Sky Survey	JPL · 163625
163626 Glatfelter	2002 UV	Pam Glatfelter (born 1955), American Operational Site Manager for the Table Mountain Observatory in California	JPL · 163626
163639 Tomnash	2002 UN_{51}	Thomas Nash (born 1943), American physicist with the Sloan Digital Sky Survey	JPL · 163639
163640 Newberg	2002 UB_{59}	Heidi Jo Newberg (born 1965), American astronomer and software developer with the Sloan Digital Sky Survey	JPL · 163640
163641 Nichol	2002 UC_{68}	Robert Nichol (born 1966), British observational cosmologist with the Sloan Digital Sky Survey	JPL · 163641
163693 Atira	2003 CP_{20}	Atira, the Native American Pawnee goddess of Earth and the evening star	JPL · 163693

== 163701–163800 ==
back to top

Named minor planet	Provisional	This minor planet was named for...	Ref · Catalog
163800 Richardnorton	2003 QS_{69}	O. Richard Norton (1937–2009), author of many popular books and articles about meteorites †	JPL · 163800

== 163801–163900 ==
back to top

Named minor planet	Provisional	This minor planet was named for...	Ref · Catalog
163819 Teleki	2003 RN_{8}	Sámuel Teleki (1845–1916), Hungarian explorer, first to reach the snow-line on Mount Kilimanjaro, first to set foot on Mount Kenya, first European to see Lake Turkana (which he named Lake Rudolf)	JPL · 163819

== 163901–164000 ==
back to top

Named minor planet	Provisional	This minor planet was named for...	Ref · Catalog
There are no named minor planets in this number range

back to top

Preceded by 162,001–163,000	Meanings of minor-planet names List of minor planets: 163,001–164,000	Succeeded by 164,001–165,000
