= List of minor planets: 163001–164000 =

The following is a partial list of minor planets, running from minor-planet number 163001 through 164000, inclusive. The primary data for this and other partial lists is based on JPL's "Small-Body Orbital Elements" and data available from the Minor Planet Center. Critical list information is also provided by the MPC, unless otherwise specified from Lowell Observatory. A detailed description of the table's columns and additional sources are given on the main page including a complete list of every page in this series, and a statistical break-up on the dynamical classification of minor planets.

Also see the summary list of all named bodies in numerical and alphabetical order, and the corresponding naming citations for the number range of this particular list. New namings may only be added to this list after official publication, as the preannouncement of names is condemned by the Working Group for Small Bodies Nomenclature of the International Astronomical Union.

Near-Earth obj.	MBA (inner)	MBA (outer)	Centaur
Mars-crosser	MBA (middle)	Jupiter trojan	Trans-Neptunian obj.
Unclassified

== 163001–163100 ==
Designation			Discovery			Properties		Ref
Permanent	Provisional	Named after	Date	Site	Discoverer(s)	Category	Diam.	Ref
163001	2001 SE_{170}	—	September 20, 2001	Socorro	LINEAR	AMO	740 m	MPC · JPL
163002	2001 SX_{175}	—	September 16, 2001	Socorro	LINEAR	HYG	5.0 km	MPC · JPL
163003	2001 SN_{226}	—	September 19, 2001	Socorro	LINEAR	·	4.8 km	MPC · JPL
163004	2001 SK_{234}	—	September 19, 2001	Socorro	LINEAR	SYL · CYB	7.3 km	MPC · JPL
163005	2001 SX_{265}	—	September 25, 2001	Desert Eagle	W. K. Y. Yeung	·	1.2 km	MPC · JPL
163006	2001 SY_{275}	—	September 24, 2001	Socorro	LINEAR	·	9.6 km	MPC · JPL
163007	2001 SD_{308}	—	September 21, 2001	Socorro	LINEAR	·	4.8 km	MPC · JPL
163008	2001 ST_{324}	—	September 16, 2001	Socorro	LINEAR	CYB	7.2 km	MPC · JPL
163009	2001 TS_{35}	—	October 14, 2001	Socorro	LINEAR	·	1.3 km	MPC · JPL
163010	2001 TM_{45}	—	October 14, 2001	Desert Eagle	W. K. Y. Yeung	SYL · CYB	6.9 km	MPC · JPL
163011	2001 TK_{75}	—	October 13, 2001	Socorro	LINEAR	·	5.0 km	MPC · JPL
163012	2001 TC_{220}	—	October 14, 2001	Socorro	LINEAR	SYL · CYB	7.3 km	MPC · JPL
163013	2001 TG_{230}	—	October 15, 2001	Palomar	NEAT	CYB	6.3 km	MPC · JPL
163014	2001 UA_{5}	—	October 17, 2001	Socorro	LINEAR	APO +1km · PHA	1.0 km	MPC · JPL
163015	2001 UX_{16}	—	October 21, 2001	Palomar	NEAT	APO · critical	140 m	MPC · JPL
163016	2001 UD_{52}	—	October 17, 2001	Socorro	LINEAR	·	1.8 km	MPC · JPL
163017	2001 UP_{79}	—	October 20, 2001	Socorro	LINEAR	·	900 m	MPC · JPL
163018	2001 UY_{97}	—	October 17, 2001	Socorro	LINEAR	·	6.3 km	MPC · JPL
163019	2001 UB_{116}	—	October 22, 2001	Socorro	LINEAR	·	6.2 km	MPC · JPL
163020	2001 VT_{47}	—	November 9, 2001	Socorro	LINEAR	·	1.3 km	MPC · JPL
163021	2001 WE_{14}	—	November 17, 2001	Socorro	LINEAR	·	1.3 km	MPC · JPL
163022	2001 WS_{28}	—	November 17, 2001	Socorro	LINEAR	·	1.2 km	MPC · JPL
163023	2001 XU_{1}	—	December 8, 2001	Socorro	LINEAR	ATE	440 m	MPC · JPL
163024	2001 XF_{10}	—	December 9, 2001	Socorro	LINEAR	V	1.5 km	MPC · JPL
163025	2001 XG_{10}	—	December 9, 2001	Socorro	LINEAR	·	1.1 km	MPC · JPL
163026	2001 XR_{30}	—	December 11, 2001	Socorro	LINEAR	APO · PHA	200 m	MPC · JPL
163027	2001 XX_{56}	—	December 10, 2001	Socorro	LINEAR	·	1.3 km	MPC · JPL
163028	2001 XQ_{69}	—	December 11, 2001	Socorro	LINEAR	·	900 m	MPC · JPL
163029	2001 XH_{104}	—	December 15, 2001	Socorro	LINEAR	·	1.1 km	MPC · JPL
163030	2001 XM_{107}	—	December 10, 2001	Socorro	LINEAR	·	1.1 km	MPC · JPL
163031	2001 XW_{117}	—	December 13, 2001	Socorro	LINEAR	·	1.9 km	MPC · JPL
163032	2001 XG_{119}	—	December 13, 2001	Socorro	LINEAR	(2076)	1.4 km	MPC · JPL
163033	2001 XX_{142}	—	December 14, 2001	Socorro	LINEAR	·	1.6 km	MPC · JPL
163034	2001 XM_{175}	—	December 14, 2001	Socorro	LINEAR	·	1.4 km	MPC · JPL
163035	2001 XK_{176}	—	December 14, 2001	Socorro	LINEAR	·	1.2 km	MPC · JPL
163036	2001 XZ_{179}	—	December 14, 2001	Socorro	LINEAR	·	1.4 km	MPC · JPL
163037	2001 XU_{180}	—	December 14, 2001	Socorro	LINEAR	·	1.3 km	MPC · JPL
163038	2001 XP_{181}	—	December 14, 2001	Socorro	LINEAR	·	1.5 km	MPC · JPL
163039	2001 XG_{189}	—	December 14, 2001	Socorro	LINEAR	·	1.0 km	MPC · JPL
163040	2001 XV_{196}	—	December 14, 2001	Socorro	LINEAR	·	1.3 km	MPC · JPL
163041	2001 XR_{203}	—	December 11, 2001	Socorro	LINEAR	·	1.0 km	MPC · JPL
163042	2001 XH_{205}	—	December 11, 2001	Socorro	LINEAR	·	3.1 km	MPC · JPL
163043	2001 XC_{211}	—	December 11, 2001	Socorro	LINEAR	·	1.4 km	MPC · JPL
163044	2001 XB_{213}	—	December 11, 2001	Socorro	LINEAR	·	2.0 km	MPC · JPL
163045	2001 XZ_{214}	—	December 13, 2001	Socorro	LINEAR	·	1.1 km	MPC · JPL
163046	2001 XR_{233}	—	December 15, 2001	Socorro	LINEAR	·	1.2 km	MPC · JPL
163047	2001 XS_{237}	—	December 15, 2001	Socorro	LINEAR	·	1.4 km	MPC · JPL
163048	2001 XJ_{240}	—	December 15, 2001	Socorro	LINEAR	·	2.1 km	MPC · JPL
163049	2001 XS_{240}	—	December 15, 2001	Socorro	LINEAR	·	1.7 km	MPC · JPL
163050	2001 XN_{252}	—	December 14, 2001	Socorro	LINEAR	·	1.1 km	MPC · JPL
163051	2001 YJ_{4}	—	December 22, 2001	Haleakala	NEAT	APO +1km · PHA	1.9 km	MPC · JPL
163052	2001 YJ_{9}	—	December 17, 2001	Socorro	LINEAR	·	1.5 km	MPC · JPL
163053	2001 YF_{11}	—	December 17, 2001	Socorro	LINEAR	·	2.0 km	MPC · JPL
163054	2001 YL_{18}	—	December 17, 2001	Socorro	LINEAR	·	1.3 km	MPC · JPL
163055	2001 YL_{61}	—	December 18, 2001	Socorro	LINEAR	·	1.4 km	MPC · JPL
163056	2001 YM_{70}	—	December 18, 2001	Socorro	LINEAR	·	1.1 km	MPC · JPL
163057	2001 YF_{74}	—	December 18, 2001	Socorro	LINEAR	·	1.3 km	MPC · JPL
163058	2001 YV_{78}	—	December 18, 2001	Socorro	LINEAR	·	1.4 km	MPC · JPL
163059	2001 YN_{90}	—	December 18, 2001	Socorro	LINEAR	·	1.2 km	MPC · JPL
163060	2001 YC_{96}	—	December 18, 2001	Palomar	NEAT	·	1.4 km	MPC · JPL
163061	2001 YV_{98}	—	December 17, 2001	Socorro	LINEAR	·	880 m	MPC · JPL
163062	2001 YC_{105}	—	December 17, 2001	Socorro	LINEAR	·	2.2 km	MPC · JPL
163063	2001 YM_{108}	—	December 17, 2001	Socorro	LINEAR	V	1.2 km	MPC · JPL
163064	2001 YN_{117}	—	December 18, 2001	Socorro	LINEAR	·	2.2 km	MPC · JPL
163065	2001 YC_{131}	—	December 17, 2001	Socorro	LINEAR	·	1.3 km	MPC · JPL
163066	2001 YH_{143}	—	December 17, 2001	Socorro	LINEAR	·	1.4 km	MPC · JPL
163067	2002 AP_{3}	—	January 6, 2002	Palomar	NEAT	APO · PHA · critical	360 m	MPC · JPL
163068	2002 AP_{5}	—	January 9, 2002	Oizumi	T. Kobayashi	·	1.8 km	MPC · JPL
163069	2002 AD_{6}	—	January 5, 2002	Kitt Peak	Spacewatch	·	1.5 km	MPC · JPL
163070	2002 AO_{7}	—	January 8, 2002	Socorro	LINEAR	T_{j} (2.91) · AMO	740 m	MPC · JPL
163071	2002 AD_{8}	—	January 5, 2002	Kitt Peak	Spacewatch	·	1.2 km	MPC · JPL
163072	2002 AD_{12}	—	January 10, 2002	Campo Imperatore	CINEOS	V	1.1 km	MPC · JPL
163073	2002 AX_{12}	—	January 10, 2002	Campo Imperatore	CINEOS	NYS	1.4 km	MPC · JPL
163074	2002 AD_{14}	—	January 12, 2002	Desert Eagle	W. K. Y. Yeung	·	2.2 km	MPC · JPL
163075	2002 AP_{17}	—	January 9, 2002	Socorro	LINEAR	·	1.3 km	MPC · JPL
163076	2002 AU_{19}	—	January 8, 2002	Socorro	LINEAR	·	1.3 km	MPC · JPL
163077	2002 AP_{20}	—	January 6, 2002	Haleakala	NEAT	·	2.0 km	MPC · JPL
163078	2002 AF_{21}	—	January 8, 2002	Socorro	LINEAR	·	1.5 km	MPC · JPL
163079	2002 AR_{21}	—	January 9, 2002	Socorro	LINEAR	·	1.4 km	MPC · JPL
163080	2002 AA_{28}	—	January 7, 2002	Anderson Mesa	LONEOS	·	1.2 km	MPC · JPL
163081	2002 AG_{29}	—	January 13, 2002	Palomar	NEAT	APO	690 m	MPC · JPL
163082	2002 AN_{39}	—	January 9, 2002	Socorro	LINEAR	·	3.0 km	MPC · JPL
163083	2002 AF_{51}	—	January 9, 2002	Socorro	LINEAR	·	1.2 km	MPC · JPL
163084	2002 AZ_{53}	—	January 9, 2002	Socorro	LINEAR	V	1.1 km	MPC · JPL
163085	2002 AC_{62}	—	January 11, 2002	Socorro	LINEAR	·	1.3 km	MPC · JPL
163086	2002 AS_{71}	—	January 8, 2002	Socorro	LINEAR	·	1.9 km	MPC · JPL
163087	2002 AN_{74}	—	January 8, 2002	Socorro	LINEAR	NYS	1.5 km	MPC · JPL
163088	2002 AO_{74}	—	January 8, 2002	Socorro	LINEAR	·	6.5 km	MPC · JPL
163089	2002 AU_{77}	—	January 8, 2002	Socorro	LINEAR	·	2.0 km	MPC · JPL
163090	2002 AK_{80}	—	January 8, 2002	Socorro	LINEAR	·	1.4 km	MPC · JPL
163091	2002 AS_{80}	—	January 8, 2002	Socorro	LINEAR	·	3.2 km	MPC · JPL
163092	2002 AR_{81}	—	January 9, 2002	Socorro	LINEAR	·	1.3 km	MPC · JPL
163093	2002 AT_{100}	—	January 8, 2002	Socorro	LINEAR	·	1.3 km	MPC · JPL
163094	2002 AU_{100}	—	January 8, 2002	Socorro	LINEAR	·	2.3 km	MPC · JPL
163095	2002 AE_{102}	—	January 8, 2002	Socorro	LINEAR	NYS	1.6 km	MPC · JPL
163096	2002 AQ_{105}	—	January 9, 2002	Socorro	LINEAR	·	1.5 km	MPC · JPL
163097	2002 AJ_{106}	—	January 9, 2002	Socorro	LINEAR	·	1.4 km	MPC · JPL
163098	2002 AU_{106}	—	January 9, 2002	Socorro	LINEAR	·	2.7 km	MPC · JPL
163099	2002 AX_{107}	—	January 9, 2002	Socorro	LINEAR	·	1.5 km	MPC · JPL
163100	2002 AA_{108}	—	January 9, 2002	Socorro	LINEAR	·	1.2 km	MPC · JPL

== 163101–163200 ==
back to top

Designation			Discovery			Properties		Ref
Permanent	Provisional	Named after	Date	Site	Discoverer(s)	Category	Diam.	Ref
163101	2002 AU_{112}	—	January 9, 2002	Socorro	LINEAR	·	2.0 km	MPC · JPL
163102	2002 AQ_{125}	—	January 11, 2002	Socorro	LINEAR	L4	10 km	MPC · JPL
163103	2002 AP_{126}	—	January 13, 2002	Socorro	LINEAR	·	1.7 km	MPC · JPL
163104	2002 AO_{129}	—	January 13, 2002	Socorro	LINEAR	·	1.0 km	MPC · JPL
163105	2002 AC_{139}	—	January 9, 2002	Socorro	LINEAR	·	1.7 km	MPC · JPL
163106	2002 AE_{140}	—	January 13, 2002	Socorro	LINEAR	·	1.1 km	MPC · JPL
163107	2002 AN_{143}	—	January 13, 2002	Socorro	LINEAR	NYS	1.9 km	MPC · JPL
163108	2002 AS_{152}	—	January 14, 2002	Socorro	LINEAR	·	1.4 km	MPC · JPL
163109	2002 AR_{156}	—	January 13, 2002	Socorro	LINEAR	·	1.3 km	MPC · JPL
163110	2002 AQ_{162}	—	January 13, 2002	Socorro	LINEAR	·	1.2 km	MPC · JPL
163111	2002 AC_{166}	—	January 13, 2002	Socorro	LINEAR	V	1.0 km	MPC · JPL
163112	2002 AD_{172}	—	January 14, 2002	Socorro	LINEAR	·	1.6 km	MPC · JPL
163113	2002 AJ_{175}	—	January 14, 2002	Socorro	LINEAR	MAS	1.6 km	MPC · JPL
163114	2002 AR_{177}	—	January 14, 2002	Socorro	LINEAR	·	2.0 km	MPC · JPL
163115	2002 AF_{191}	—	January 11, 2002	Kitt Peak	Spacewatch	·	1.5 km	MPC · JPL
163116	2002 AE_{197}	—	January 14, 2002	Kitt Peak	Spacewatch	·	1.1 km	MPC · JPL
163117	2002 AK_{197}	—	January 13, 2002	Socorro	LINEAR	·	970 m	MPC · JPL
163118	2002 AS_{197}	—	January 14, 2002	Palomar	NEAT	·	1.9 km	MPC · JPL
163119 Timmckay	2002 AO_{208}	Timmckay	January 9, 2002	Apache Point	SDSS	·	1.1 km	MPC · JPL
163120	2002 BW_{1}	—	January 21, 2002	Desert Eagle	W. K. Y. Yeung	·	3.1 km	MPC · JPL
163121	2002 BY_{9}	—	January 18, 2002	Socorro	LINEAR	·	1.9 km	MPC · JPL
163122	2002 BL_{11}	—	January 19, 2002	Socorro	LINEAR	·	1.2 km	MPC · JPL
163123	2002 BM_{15}	—	January 19, 2002	Socorro	LINEAR	·	1.6 km	MPC · JPL
163124	2002 BC_{22}	—	January 21, 2002	Socorro	LINEAR	·	1.3 km	MPC · JPL
163125	2002 BN_{29}	—	January 20, 2002	Anderson Mesa	LONEOS	V	1.3 km	MPC · JPL
163126	2002 BO_{29}	—	January 20, 2002	Anderson Mesa	LONEOS	·	1.8 km	MPC · JPL
163127	2002 BB_{30}	—	January 21, 2002	Anderson Mesa	LONEOS	·	4.2 km	MPC · JPL
163128	2002 CN	—	February 2, 2002	Palomar	NEAT	·	3.1 km	MPC · JPL
163129	2002 CH_{1}	—	February 3, 2002	Palomar	NEAT	·	1.2 km	MPC · JPL
163130	2002 CB_{5}	—	February 4, 2002	Palomar	NEAT	·	3.1 km	MPC · JPL
163131	2002 CF_{6}	—	February 4, 2002	Haleakala	NEAT	·	2.2 km	MPC · JPL
163132	2002 CU_{11}	—	February 7, 2002	Socorro	LINEAR	APO · PHA	460 m	MPC · JPL
163133	2002 CV_{13}	—	February 8, 2002	Desert Eagle	W. K. Y. Yeung	·	1.9 km	MPC · JPL
163134	2002 CM_{16}	—	February 6, 2002	Socorro	LINEAR	·	1.2 km	MPC · JPL
163135	2002 CT_{22}	—	February 5, 2002	Palomar	NEAT	L4	17 km	MPC · JPL
163136	2002 CX_{27}	—	February 6, 2002	Socorro	LINEAR	·	1.1 km	MPC · JPL
163137	2002 CY_{28}	—	February 6, 2002	Socorro	LINEAR	·	1.0 km	MPC · JPL
163138	2002 CA_{37}	—	February 7, 2002	Socorro	LINEAR	·	2.7 km	MPC · JPL
163139	2002 CQ_{39}	—	February 11, 2002	Desert Eagle	W. K. Y. Yeung	(2076)	1.5 km	MPC · JPL
163140	2002 CU_{47}	—	February 3, 2002	Haleakala	NEAT	·	1.3 km	MPC · JPL
163141	2002 CS_{50}	—	February 12, 2002	Desert Eagle	W. K. Y. Yeung	·	1.6 km	MPC · JPL
163142	2002 CD_{51}	—	February 12, 2002	Desert Eagle	W. K. Y. Yeung	NYS	1.8 km	MPC · JPL
163143	2002 CH_{56}	—	February 7, 2002	Socorro	LINEAR	·	2.1 km	MPC · JPL
163144	2002 CO_{80}	—	February 7, 2002	Socorro	LINEAR	V	2.7 km	MPC · JPL
163145	2002 CS_{88}	—	February 7, 2002	Socorro	LINEAR	·	1.1 km	MPC · JPL
163146	2002 CS_{92}	—	February 7, 2002	Socorro	LINEAR	·	1.7 km	MPC · JPL
163147	2002 CK_{95}	—	February 7, 2002	Socorro	LINEAR	·	2.0 km	MPC · JPL
163148	2002 CQ_{95}	—	February 7, 2002	Socorro	LINEAR	·	1.2 km	MPC · JPL
163149	2002 CV_{106}	—	February 7, 2002	Socorro	LINEAR	·	2.3 km	MPC · JPL
163150	2002 CE_{109}	—	February 7, 2002	Socorro	LINEAR	V	1.3 km	MPC · JPL
163151	2002 CW_{111}	—	February 7, 2002	Socorro	LINEAR	·	2.5 km	MPC · JPL
163152	2002 CQ_{112}	—	February 7, 2002	Socorro	LINEAR	·	2.5 km	MPC · JPL
163153 Takuyaonishi	2002 CO_{116}	Takuyaonishi	February 12, 2002	Kuma Kogen	A. Nakamura	·	3.1 km	MPC · JPL
163154	2002 CE_{123}	—	February 7, 2002	Socorro	LINEAR	PHO	2.0 km	MPC · JPL
163155	2002 CL_{130}	—	February 7, 2002	Socorro	LINEAR	L4	14 km	MPC · JPL
163156	2002 CX_{130}	—	February 7, 2002	Socorro	LINEAR	·	1.1 km	MPC · JPL
163157	2002 CY_{130}	—	February 7, 2002	Socorro	LINEAR	MAS	1.5 km	MPC · JPL
163158	2002 CS_{136}	—	February 8, 2002	Socorro	LINEAR	V	1.1 km	MPC · JPL
163159	2002 CX_{136}	—	February 8, 2002	Socorro	LINEAR	·	1.2 km	MPC · JPL
163160	2002 CM_{146}	—	February 9, 2002	Socorro	LINEAR	ERI	3.3 km	MPC · JPL
163161	2002 CE_{152}	—	February 10, 2002	Socorro	LINEAR	MAS	1.8 km	MPC · JPL
163162	2002 CG_{159}	—	February 7, 2002	Socorro	LINEAR	·	2.2 km	MPC · JPL
163163	2002 CB_{165}	—	February 8, 2002	Socorro	LINEAR	·	2.0 km	MPC · JPL
163164	2002 CC_{169}	—	February 8, 2002	Socorro	LINEAR	·	2.0 km	MPC · JPL
163165	2002 CC_{177}	—	February 10, 2002	Socorro	LINEAR	·	1.9 km	MPC · JPL
163166	2002 CX_{177}	—	February 10, 2002	Socorro	LINEAR	MAS	1.0 km	MPC · JPL
163167	2002 CY_{178}	—	February 10, 2002	Socorro	LINEAR	NYS	1.6 km	MPC · JPL
163168	2002 CL_{195}	—	February 10, 2002	Socorro	LINEAR	MAS	1.1 km	MPC · JPL
163169	2002 CX_{199}	—	February 10, 2002	Socorro	LINEAR	·	1.1 km	MPC · JPL
163170	2002 CQ_{218}	—	February 10, 2002	Socorro	LINEAR	·	2.5 km	MPC · JPL
163171	2002 CU_{220}	—	February 10, 2002	Socorro	LINEAR	MAS	1.1 km	MPC · JPL
163172	2002 CV_{225}	—	February 3, 2002	Palomar	NEAT	·	1.2 km	MPC · JPL
163173	2002 CX_{233}	—	February 11, 2002	Socorro	LINEAR	·	1.9 km	MPC · JPL
163174	2002 CX_{236}	—	February 8, 2002	Socorro	LINEAR	PHO	2.1 km	MPC · JPL
163175	2002 CB_{239}	—	February 11, 2002	Socorro	LINEAR	·	1.5 km	MPC · JPL
163176	2002 CL_{241}	—	February 11, 2002	Socorro	LINEAR	V	1.1 km	MPC · JPL
163177	2002 CM_{242}	—	February 11, 2002	Socorro	LINEAR	·	1.4 km	MPC · JPL
163178	2002 CU_{247}	—	February 15, 2002	Socorro	LINEAR	·	2.4 km	MPC · JPL
163179	2002 CF_{252}	—	February 4, 2002	Palomar	NEAT	·	1.6 km	MPC · JPL
163180	2002 CU_{270}	—	February 8, 2002	Kitt Peak	Spacewatch	NYS ·	2.5 km	MPC · JPL
163181	2002 CL_{272}	—	February 8, 2002	Anderson Mesa	LONEOS	·	2.2 km	MPC · JPL
163182	2002 CZ_{278}	—	February 7, 2002	Kitt Peak	Spacewatch	·	2.2 km	MPC · JPL
163183	2002 CZ_{282}	—	February 8, 2002	Socorro	LINEAR	·	1.9 km	MPC · JPL
163184	2002 CZ_{299}	—	February 11, 2002	Socorro	LINEAR	·	2.3 km	MPC · JPL
163185	2002 DJ_{2}	—	February 19, 2002	Desert Eagle	W. K. Y. Yeung	·	3.5 km	MPC · JPL
163186	2002 DA_{13}	—	February 24, 2002	Palomar	NEAT	NYS ·	2.0 km	MPC · JPL
163187	2002 DD_{16}	—	February 19, 2002	Kitt Peak	Spacewatch	MAS	1.1 km	MPC · JPL
163188	2002 ES_{4}	—	March 10, 2002	Cima Ekar	ADAS	MAS	1.2 km	MPC · JPL
163189	2002 EU_{6}	—	March 6, 2002	Siding Spring	R. H. McNaught	L4 · ERY	16 km	MPC · JPL
163190	2002 EV_{7}	—	March 12, 2002	Črni Vrh	Matičič, S.	·	2.0 km	MPC · JPL
163191	2002 EQ_{9}	—	March 15, 2002	Palomar	NEAT	APO	460 m	MPC · JPL
163192	2002 EB_{11}	—	March 13, 2002	Črni Vrh	Skvarč, J.	NYS	2.4 km	MPC · JPL
163193	2002 EQ_{12}	—	March 14, 2002	Desert Eagle	W. K. Y. Yeung	·	3.3 km	MPC · JPL
163194	2002 EC_{14}	—	March 5, 2002	Palomar	NEAT	·	1.9 km	MPC · JPL
163195	2002 EP_{21}	—	March 10, 2002	Haleakala	NEAT	·	1.5 km	MPC · JPL
163196	2002 EN_{24}	—	March 5, 2002	Kitt Peak	Spacewatch	L4	20 km	MPC · JPL
163197	2002 EZ_{25}	—	March 10, 2002	Anderson Mesa	LONEOS	·	1.4 km	MPC · JPL
163198	2002 EX_{27}	—	March 9, 2002	Socorro	LINEAR	·	1.7 km	MPC · JPL
163199	2002 ED_{29}	—	March 9, 2002	Socorro	LINEAR	·	1.4 km	MPC · JPL
163200	2002 EF_{36}	—	March 9, 2002	Kitt Peak	Spacewatch	·	1.2 km	MPC · JPL

== 163201–163300 ==
back to top

Designation			Discovery			Properties		Ref
Permanent	Provisional	Named after	Date	Site	Discoverer(s)	Category	Diam.	Ref
163201	2002 EB_{39}	—	March 12, 2002	Kitt Peak	Spacewatch	·	2.5 km	MPC · JPL
163202	2002 EN_{40}	—	March 9, 2002	Socorro	LINEAR	·	1.8 km	MPC · JPL
163203	2002 EZ_{40}	—	March 9, 2002	Socorro	LINEAR	·	1.6 km	MPC · JPL
163204	2002 ED_{41}	—	March 10, 2002	Socorro	LINEAR	·	1.3 km	MPC · JPL
163205	2002 EP_{42}	—	March 12, 2002	Socorro	LINEAR	·	1.4 km	MPC · JPL
163206	2002 EP_{44}	—	March 9, 2002	Palomar	NEAT	·	2.3 km	MPC · JPL
163207	2002 EW_{44}	—	March 10, 2002	Haleakala	NEAT	·	4.0 km	MPC · JPL
163208	2002 EN_{48}	—	March 12, 2002	Palomar	NEAT	L4	10 km	MPC · JPL
163209	2002 EC_{49}	—	March 12, 2002	Palomar	NEAT	·	1.8 km	MPC · JPL
163210	2002 EJ_{49}	—	March 12, 2002	Palomar	NEAT	NYS	1.7 km	MPC · JPL
163211	2002 EA_{50}	—	March 12, 2002	Palomar	NEAT	·	2.2 km	MPC · JPL
163212	2002 EZ_{56}	—	March 13, 2002	Socorro	LINEAR	·	1.1 km	MPC · JPL
163213	2002 EJ_{62}	—	March 13, 2002	Socorro	LINEAR	·	2.5 km	MPC · JPL
163214	2002 EY_{66}	—	March 13, 2002	Socorro	LINEAR	·	1.8 km	MPC · JPL
163215	2002 EB_{67}	—	March 13, 2002	Socorro	LINEAR	·	1.6 km	MPC · JPL
163216	2002 EN_{68}	—	March 13, 2002	Socorro	LINEAR	L4 · ERY	13 km	MPC · JPL
163217	2002 EY_{70}	—	March 13, 2002	Socorro	LINEAR	NYS	1.9 km	MPC · JPL
163218	2002 EA_{78}	—	March 11, 2002	Kitt Peak	Spacewatch	·	2.0 km	MPC · JPL
163219	2002 EM_{78}	—	March 13, 2002	Kitt Peak	Spacewatch	NYS	1.2 km	MPC · JPL
163220	2002 EN_{85}	—	March 9, 2002	Socorro	LINEAR	NYS	1.4 km	MPC · JPL
163221	2002 EN_{88}	—	March 9, 2002	Socorro	LINEAR	·	2.3 km	MPC · JPL
163222	2002 EP_{88}	—	March 9, 2002	Socorro	LINEAR	·	1.7 km	MPC · JPL
163223	2002 EL_{90}	—	March 12, 2002	Socorro	LINEAR	·	1.3 km	MPC · JPL
163224	2002 ES_{102}	—	March 9, 2002	Kitt Peak	Spacewatch	·	2.0 km	MPC · JPL
163225	2002 EU_{102}	—	March 9, 2002	Kitt Peak	Spacewatch	MAS	860 m	MPC · JPL
163226	2002 EA_{103}	—	March 9, 2002	Nogales	Tenagra II	·	2.6 km	MPC · JPL
163227	2002 EA_{104}	—	March 9, 2002	Anderson Mesa	LONEOS	·	2.7 km	MPC · JPL
163228	2002 EU_{105}	—	March 9, 2002	Anderson Mesa	LONEOS	·	1.6 km	MPC · JPL
163229	2002 ER_{117}	—	March 10, 2002	Kitt Peak	Spacewatch	V	1.1 km	MPC · JPL
163230	2002 EG_{125}	—	March 12, 2002	Palomar	NEAT	NYS	2.5 km	MPC · JPL
163231	2002 EH_{129}	—	March 13, 2002	Socorro	LINEAR	·	1.9 km	MPC · JPL
163232	2002 ED_{135}	—	March 13, 2002	Palomar	NEAT	RAF · fast	1.6 km	MPC · JPL
163233	2002 EA_{139}	—	March 12, 2002	Palomar	NEAT	·	1.8 km	MPC · JPL
163234	2002 EG_{140}	—	March 12, 2002	Palomar	NEAT	·	2.6 km	MPC · JPL
163235	2002 ED_{149}	—	March 15, 2002	Palomar	NEAT	·	1.2 km	MPC · JPL
163236	2002 EH_{149}	—	March 15, 2002	Palomar	NEAT	MAS	1.3 km	MPC · JPL
163237	2002 EO_{151}	—	March 15, 2002	Kitt Peak	Spacewatch	·	1.3 km	MPC · JPL
163238	2002 EQ_{151}	—	March 15, 2002	Kitt Peak	Spacewatch	L4	17 km	MPC · JPL
163239	2002 EU_{156}	—	March 10, 2002	Cima Ekar	ADAS	·	1.1 km	MPC · JPL
163240	2002 EM_{157}	—	March 13, 2002	Palomar	NEAT	L4	15 km	MPC · JPL
163241	2002 ED_{161}	—	March 13, 2002	Socorro	LINEAR	·	1.8 km	MPC · JPL
163242	2002 FE	—	March 16, 2002	Haleakala	NEAT	·	2.8 km	MPC · JPL
163243	2002 FB_{3}	—	March 18, 2002	Socorro	LINEAR	ATE +1km · PHA	1.7 km	MPC · JPL
163244 Matthewhill	2002 FU_{18}	Matthewhill	March 18, 2002	Kitt Peak	M. W. Buie	·	1.7 km	MPC · JPL
163245	2002 FW_{23}	—	March 18, 2002	Kitt Peak	Spacewatch	L4	20 km	MPC · JPL
163246	2002 FH_{28}	—	March 20, 2002	Socorro	LINEAR	·	1.9 km	MPC · JPL
163247	2002 FP_{28}	—	March 20, 2002	Socorro	LINEAR	·	1.9 km	MPC · JPL
163248	2002 FJ_{38}	—	March 30, 2002	Palomar	NEAT	·	1.3 km	MPC · JPL
163249	2002 GT	—	April 3, 2002	Kitt Peak	Spacewatch	APO · PHA	650 m	MPC · JPL
163250	2002 GH_{1}	—	April 4, 2002	Socorro	LINEAR	T_{j} (2.93) · AMO +1km	2.9 km	MPC · JPL
163251	2002 GX_{4}	—	April 10, 2002	Palomar	NEAT	·	2.0 km	MPC · JPL
163252	2002 GD_{11}	—	April 14, 2002	Kitt Peak	Spacewatch	AMO +1km	930 m	MPC · JPL
163253	2002 GS_{18}	—	April 14, 2002	Socorro	LINEAR	·	3.1 km	MPC · JPL
163254	2002 GL_{24}	—	April 13, 2002	Kitt Peak	Spacewatch	·	2.2 km	MPC · JPL
163255 Adrianhill	2002 GT_{27}	Adrianhill	April 6, 2002	Cerro Tololo	M. W. Buie	NYS	1.7 km	MPC · JPL
163256	2002 GU_{35}	—	April 2, 2002	Kitt Peak	Spacewatch	L4	17 km	MPC · JPL
163257	2002 GR_{36}	—	April 2, 2002	Kitt Peak	Spacewatch	·	2.3 km	MPC · JPL
163258	2002 GT_{37}	—	April 3, 2002	Socorro	LINEAR	·	2.3 km	MPC · JPL
163259	2002 GS_{40}	—	April 4, 2002	Palomar	NEAT	·	1.7 km	MPC · JPL
163260	2002 GO_{43}	—	April 4, 2002	Palomar	NEAT	·	1.9 km	MPC · JPL
163261	2002 GF_{45}	—	April 4, 2002	Palomar	NEAT	MAS	1.2 km	MPC · JPL
163262	2002 GW_{63}	—	April 8, 2002	Palomar	NEAT	·	2.2 km	MPC · JPL
163263	2002 GA_{71}	—	April 9, 2002	Palomar	NEAT	L4	19 km	MPC · JPL
163264	2002 GY_{72}	—	April 9, 2002	Anderson Mesa	LONEOS	·	2.1 km	MPC · JPL
163265	2002 GU_{73}	—	April 9, 2002	Palomar	NEAT	·	2.0 km	MPC · JPL
163266	2002 GF_{75}	—	April 9, 2002	Socorro	LINEAR	NYS	1.8 km	MPC · JPL
163267	2002 GQ_{77}	—	April 9, 2002	Anderson Mesa	LONEOS	V	1.1 km	MPC · JPL
163268	2002 GG_{81}	—	April 10, 2002	Socorro	LINEAR	·	1.9 km	MPC · JPL
163269	2002 GX_{84}	—	April 10, 2002	Socorro	LINEAR	·	5.5 km	MPC · JPL
163270	2002 GE_{86}	—	April 10, 2002	Socorro	LINEAR	JUN	1.6 km	MPC · JPL
163271	2002 GZ_{87}	—	April 10, 2002	Socorro	LINEAR	ADE	4.5 km	MPC · JPL
163272	2002 GV_{93}	—	April 9, 2002	Socorro	LINEAR	·	2.1 km	MPC · JPL
163273	2002 GN_{102}	—	April 10, 2002	Socorro	LINEAR	·	3.2 km	MPC · JPL
163274	2002 GP_{106}	—	April 11, 2002	Anderson Mesa	LONEOS	·	2.8 km	MPC · JPL
163275	2002 GH_{107}	—	April 11, 2002	Socorro	LINEAR	SUL	3.7 km	MPC · JPL
163276	2002 GT_{107}	—	April 11, 2002	Socorro	LINEAR	·	2.6 km	MPC · JPL
163277	2002 GO_{110}	—	April 10, 2002	Socorro	LINEAR	·	2.4 km	MPC · JPL
163278	2002 GD_{114}	—	April 11, 2002	Socorro	LINEAR	V	1.3 km	MPC · JPL
163279	2002 GB_{117}	—	April 11, 2002	Socorro	LINEAR	·	2.2 km	MPC · JPL
163280	2002 GF_{117}	—	April 11, 2002	Socorro	LINEAR	·	1.9 km	MPC · JPL
163281	2002 GL_{117}	—	April 11, 2002	Socorro	LINEAR	·	2.0 km	MPC · JPL
163282	2002 GR_{119}	—	April 12, 2002	Socorro	LINEAR	·	4.2 km	MPC · JPL
163283	2002 GV_{120}	—	April 12, 2002	Kitt Peak	Spacewatch	·	1.2 km	MPC · JPL
163284	2002 GZ_{128}	—	April 12, 2002	Socorro	LINEAR	·	1.6 km	MPC · JPL
163285	2002 GK_{136}	—	April 12, 2002	Kitt Peak	Spacewatch	NYS	1.5 km	MPC · JPL
163286	2002 GT_{137}	—	April 12, 2002	Socorro	LINEAR	·	2.0 km	MPC · JPL
163287	2002 GB_{140}	—	April 13, 2002	Palomar	NEAT	·	2.4 km	MPC · JPL
163288	2002 GD_{140}	—	April 13, 2002	Palomar	NEAT	·	1.8 km	MPC · JPL
163289	2002 GE_{140}	—	April 13, 2002	Kitt Peak	Spacewatch	(5)	1.6 km	MPC · JPL
163290	2002 GE_{141}	—	April 13, 2002	Palomar	NEAT	·	1.8 km	MPC · JPL
163291	2002 GT_{143}	—	April 13, 2002	Kitt Peak	Spacewatch	·	2.6 km	MPC · JPL
163292	2002 GB_{151}	—	April 14, 2002	Socorro	LINEAR	V	1.1 km	MPC · JPL
163293	2002 GL_{152}	—	April 12, 2002	Palomar	NEAT	·	2.4 km	MPC · JPL
163294	2002 GZ_{153}	—	April 12, 2002	Palomar	NEAT	·	2.8 km	MPC · JPL
163295	2002 HW	—	April 16, 2002	Socorro	LINEAR	APO · critical	450 m	MPC · JPL
163296	2002 HK_{2}	—	April 16, 2002	Socorro	LINEAR	EUN	1.8 km	MPC · JPL
163297	2002 HD_{6}	—	April 17, 2002	Socorro	LINEAR	NYS	2.3 km	MPC · JPL
163298	2002 HG_{8}	—	April 18, 2002	Socorro	LINEAR	·	2.4 km	MPC · JPL
163299	2002 HP_{16}	—	April 18, 2002	Palomar	NEAT	·	1.5 km	MPC · JPL
163300	2002 JJ_{4}	—	May 5, 2002	Socorro	LINEAR	·	4.6 km	MPC · JPL

== 163301–163400 ==
back to top

Designation			Discovery			Properties		Ref
Permanent	Provisional	Named after	Date	Site	Discoverer(s)	Category	Diam.	Ref
163301	2002 JE_{8}	—	May 6, 2002	Palomar	NEAT	·	4.2 km	MPC · JPL
163302	2002 JC_{12}	—	May 6, 2002	Anderson Mesa	LONEOS	·	3.8 km	MPC · JPL
163303	2002 JS_{15}	—	May 8, 2002	Socorro	LINEAR	·	3.3 km	MPC · JPL
163304	2002 JF_{25}	—	May 8, 2002	Socorro	LINEAR	·	2.6 km	MPC · JPL
163305	2002 JR_{35}	—	May 9, 2002	Socorro	LINEAR	·	3.5 km	MPC · JPL
163306	2002 JC_{42}	—	May 8, 2002	Socorro	LINEAR	·	2.0 km	MPC · JPL
163307	2002 JU_{45}	—	May 9, 2002	Socorro	LINEAR	·	2.3 km	MPC · JPL
163308	2002 JV_{45}	—	May 9, 2002	Socorro	LINEAR	·	2.1 km	MPC · JPL
163309	2002 JC_{59}	—	May 9, 2002	Socorro	LINEAR	MAR	2.3 km	MPC · JPL
163310	2002 JH_{60}	—	May 10, 2002	Socorro	LINEAR	·	3.0 km	MPC · JPL
163311	2002 JQ_{66}	—	May 10, 2002	Socorro	LINEAR	·	2.3 km	MPC · JPL
163312	2002 JE_{69}	—	May 7, 2002	Socorro	LINEAR	·	2.1 km	MPC · JPL
163313	2002 JG_{75}	—	May 9, 2002	Socorro	LINEAR	·	2.3 km	MPC · JPL
163314	2002 JY_{82}	—	May 11, 2002	Socorro	LINEAR	V	1.3 km	MPC · JPL
163315	2002 JT_{83}	—	May 11, 2002	Socorro	LINEAR	·	3.4 km	MPC · JPL
163316	2002 JO_{85}	—	May 11, 2002	Socorro	LINEAR	·	1.7 km	MPC · JPL
163317	2002 JM_{87}	—	May 11, 2002	Socorro	LINEAR	·	3.2 km	MPC · JPL
163318	2002 JC_{89}	—	May 11, 2002	Socorro	LINEAR	·	3.7 km	MPC · JPL
163319	2002 JB_{98}	—	May 8, 2002	Socorro	LINEAR	·	4.3 km	MPC · JPL
163320	2002 JS_{106}	—	May 11, 2002	Palomar	NEAT	·	2.8 km	MPC · JPL
163321	2002 JY_{106}	—	May 11, 2002	Palomar	NEAT	·	2.5 km	MPC · JPL
163322	2002 JJ_{112}	—	May 11, 2002	Socorro	LINEAR	·	3.2 km	MPC · JPL
163323	2002 JS_{115}	—	May 15, 2002	Haleakala	NEAT	·	1.5 km	MPC · JPL
163324	2002 JJ_{116}	—	May 1, 2002	Palomar	NEAT	RAF	1.8 km	MPC · JPL
163325	2002 JZ_{120}	—	May 5, 2002	Palomar	NEAT	EUN	1.7 km	MPC · JPL
163326	2002 JF_{124}	—	May 6, 2002	Palomar	NEAT	MAR	1.9 km	MPC · JPL
163327	2002 JR_{131}	—	May 9, 2002	Palomar	NEAT	·	2.2 km	MPC · JPL
163328	2002 JU_{132}	—	May 9, 2002	Palomar	NEAT	·	1.2 km	MPC · JPL
163329	2002 JO_{146}	—	May 15, 2002	Haleakala	NEAT	·	2.5 km	MPC · JPL
163330	2002 JJ_{147}	—	May 9, 2002	Socorro	LINEAR	·	2.6 km	MPC · JPL
163331	2002 KX_{5}	—	May 18, 2002	Socorro	LINEAR	·	2.5 km	MPC · JPL
163332	2002 KZ_{5}	—	May 18, 2002	Socorro	LINEAR	·	2.5 km	MPC · JPL
163333	2002 KU_{8}	—	May 29, 2002	Haleakala	NEAT	EUN	2.5 km	MPC · JPL
163334	2002 KB_{15}	—	May 16, 2002	Socorro	LINEAR	·	2.4 km	MPC · JPL
163335	2002 LJ	—	June 1, 2002	Socorro	LINEAR	APO +1km	1.3 km	MPC · JPL
163336	2002 LE_{5}	—	June 5, 2002	Palomar	NEAT	(194)	3.1 km	MPC · JPL
163337	2002 LF_{11}	—	June 5, 2002	Socorro	LINEAR	(5)	2.2 km	MPC · JPL
163338	2002 LS_{13}	—	June 6, 2002	Socorro	LINEAR	·	3.6 km	MPC · JPL
163339	2002 LU_{24}	—	June 1, 2002	Palomar	NEAT	·	4.4 km	MPC · JPL
163340	2002 LW_{28}	—	June 9, 2002	Socorro	LINEAR	DOR	4.8 km	MPC · JPL
163341	2002 LP_{32}	—	June 11, 2002	Fountain Hills	C. W. Juels, P. R. Holvorcem	·	3.4 km	MPC · JPL
163342	2002 LB_{44}	—	June 10, 2002	Socorro	LINEAR	·	5.8 km	MPC · JPL
163343	2002 LC_{53}	—	June 8, 2002	Socorro	LINEAR	·	3.8 km	MPC · JPL
163344	2002 MS_{2}	—	June 17, 2002	Palomar	NEAT	·	4.0 km	MPC · JPL
163345	2002 MK_{5}	—	June 24, 2002	Palomar	NEAT	AGN	1.9 km	MPC · JPL
163346	2002 NS	—	July 4, 2002	Reedy Creek	J. Broughton	DOR	4.5 km	MPC · JPL
163347	2002 NK_{4}	—	July 3, 2002	Palomar	NEAT	·	5.1 km	MPC · JPL
163348	2002 NN_{4}	—	July 9, 2002	Socorro	LINEAR	ATE · PHA	740 m	MPC · JPL
163349	2002 NZ_{4}	—	July 10, 2002	Campo Imperatore	CINEOS	·	3.8 km	MPC · JPL
163350	2002 NP_{26}	—	July 9, 2002	Socorro	LINEAR	·	4.3 km	MPC · JPL
163351	2002 NW_{32}	—	July 13, 2002	Socorro	LINEAR	·	4.8 km	MPC · JPL
163352	2002 NR_{42}	—	July 15, 2002	Palomar	NEAT	PAD	4.0 km	MPC · JPL
163353	2002 NN_{43}	—	July 15, 2002	Palomar	NEAT	·	3.7 km	MPC · JPL
163354	2002 NW_{43}	—	July 11, 2002	Socorro	LINEAR	MAR	1.6 km	MPC · JPL
163355	2002 NQ_{49}	—	July 14, 2002	Palomar	NEAT	·	2.9 km	MPC · JPL
163356	2002 NJ_{59}	—	July 8, 2002	Xinglong	SCAP	·	3.8 km	MPC · JPL
163357	2002 NH_{63}	—	July 9, 2002	Palomar	NEAT	·	2.9 km	MPC · JPL
163358	2002 NN_{63}	—	July 9, 2002	Palomar	NEAT	·	2.2 km	MPC · JPL
163359	2002 OJ_{5}	—	July 17, 2002	Palomar	NEAT	EUN	1.8 km	MPC · JPL
163360	2002 OD_{7}	—	July 20, 2002	Palomar	NEAT	·	4.7 km	MPC · JPL
163361	2002 OX_{9}	—	July 21, 2002	Palomar	NEAT	NAE	5.5 km	MPC · JPL
163362	2002 OZ_{14}	—	July 18, 2002	Socorro	LINEAR	·	6.4 km	MPC · JPL
163363	2002 OV_{19}	—	July 29, 2002	Emerald Lane	L. Ball	·	3.1 km	MPC · JPL
163364	2002 OD_{20}	—	July 21, 2002	Palomar	NEAT	APO · PHA	590 m	MPC · JPL
163365	2002 ON_{20}	—	July 28, 2002	Haleakala	NEAT	GEF	2.1 km	MPC · JPL
163366	2002 PM	—	August 1, 2002	Campo Imperatore	CINEOS	·	3.3 km	MPC · JPL
163367	2002 PP	—	August 2, 2002	Campo Imperatore	CINEOS	·	4.1 km	MPC · JPL
163368	2002 PF_{3}	—	August 3, 2002	Palomar	NEAT	·	7.8 km	MPC · JPL
163369	2002 PK_{17}	—	August 6, 2002	Palomar	NEAT	·	3.6 km	MPC · JPL
163370	2002 PG_{21}	—	August 6, 2002	Palomar	NEAT	·	3.3 km	MPC · JPL
163371	2002 PL_{27}	—	August 6, 2002	Palomar	NEAT	TEL	2.5 km	MPC · JPL
163372	2002 PP_{38}	—	August 6, 2002	Palomar	NEAT	KOR	2.2 km	MPC · JPL
163373	2002 PZ_{39}	—	August 10, 2002	Socorro	LINEAR	APO · PHA · slow	560 m	MPC · JPL
163374	2002 PG_{44}	—	August 5, 2002	Socorro	LINEAR	·	6.0 km	MPC · JPL
163375	2002 PT_{48}	—	August 10, 2002	Socorro	LINEAR	·	4.2 km	MPC · JPL
163376	2002 PM_{54}	—	August 5, 2002	Socorro	LINEAR	·	5.4 km	MPC · JPL
163377	2002 PW_{62}	—	August 8, 2002	Palomar	NEAT	GEF	2.8 km	MPC · JPL
163378	2002 PY_{78}	—	August 11, 2002	Palomar	NEAT	·	3.6 km	MPC · JPL
163379	2002 PK_{85}	—	August 10, 2002	Socorro	LINEAR	·	3.3 km	MPC · JPL
163380	2002 PN_{86}	—	August 13, 2002	Vicques	M. Ory	DOR	5.0 km	MPC · JPL
163381	2002 PV_{101}	—	August 12, 2002	Socorro	LINEAR	·	5.3 km	MPC · JPL
163382	2002 PZ_{116}	—	August 14, 2002	Anderson Mesa	LONEOS	·	3.3 km	MPC · JPL
163383	2002 PP_{118}	—	August 13, 2002	Anderson Mesa	LONEOS	·	3.3 km	MPC · JPL
163384	2002 PV_{125}	—	August 14, 2002	Socorro	LINEAR	·	3.5 km	MPC · JPL
163385	2002 PL_{127}	—	August 14, 2002	Socorro	LINEAR	·	2.7 km	MPC · JPL
163386	2002 PP_{156}	—	August 11, 2002	Palomar	S. F. Hönig	KOR	1.6 km	MPC · JPL
163387	2002 PZ_{178}	—	August 7, 2002	Palomar	NEAT	·	3.2 km	MPC · JPL
163388	2002 QG_{1}	—	August 16, 2002	Socorro	LINEAR	·	5.0 km	MPC · JPL
163389	2002 QS_{1}	—	August 16, 2002	Haleakala	NEAT	·	4.8 km	MPC · JPL
163390	2002 QM_{4}	—	August 16, 2002	Haleakala	NEAT	EOS	4.5 km	MPC · JPL
163391	2002 QU_{12}	—	August 26, 2002	Palomar	NEAT	GEF	2.3 km	MPC · JPL
163392	2002 QH_{32}	—	August 29, 2002	Palomar	NEAT	·	3.2 km	MPC · JPL
163393	2002 QR_{34}	—	August 29, 2002	Palomar	NEAT	·	4.4 km	MPC · JPL
163394	2002 QC_{39}	—	August 30, 2002	Kitt Peak	Spacewatch	·	4.5 km	MPC · JPL
163395	2002 QJ_{42}	—	August 30, 2002	Palomar	NEAT	·	4.5 km	MPC · JPL
163396	2002 QR_{43}	—	August 30, 2002	Palomar	NEAT	·	3.6 km	MPC · JPL
163397	2002 QU_{49}	—	August 20, 2002	Palomar	R. Matson	·	5.7 km	MPC · JPL
163398	2002 QQ_{55}	—	August 29, 2002	Palomar	S. F. Hönig	EOS	2.6 km	MPC · JPL
163399	2002 QT_{64}	—	August 28, 2002	Palomar	NEAT	KOR	2.0 km	MPC · JPL
163400	2002 QK_{74}	—	August 18, 2002	Palomar	NEAT	·	2.8 km	MPC · JPL

== 163401–163500 ==
back to top

Designation			Discovery			Properties		Ref
Permanent	Provisional	Named after	Date	Site	Discoverer(s)	Category	Diam.	Ref
163401	2002 QP_{83}	—	August 17, 2002	Palomar	NEAT	AGN	1.8 km	MPC · JPL
163402	2002 QA_{86}	—	August 17, 2002	Palomar	NEAT	·	3.0 km	MPC · JPL
163403	2002 QT_{86}	—	August 17, 2002	Palomar	NEAT	·	2.4 km	MPC · JPL
163404	2002 QD_{90}	—	August 19, 2002	Palomar	NEAT	GEF	2.4 km	MPC · JPL
163405	2002 QL_{103}	—	August 24, 2002	Palomar	NEAT	EOS	4.0 km	MPC · JPL
163406	2002 RN_{2}	—	September 4, 2002	Anderson Mesa	LONEOS	DOR	5.7 km	MPC · JPL
163407	2002 RH_{5}	—	September 3, 2002	Palomar	NEAT	·	7.4 km	MPC · JPL
163408	2002 RC_{7}	—	September 2, 2002	Kitt Peak	Spacewatch	KOR	2.7 km	MPC · JPL
163409	2002 RC_{12}	—	September 4, 2002	Anderson Mesa	LONEOS	·	4.4 km	MPC · JPL
163410	2002 RK_{18}	—	September 4, 2002	Anderson Mesa	LONEOS	·	3.5 km	MPC · JPL
163411	2002 RC_{23}	—	September 4, 2002	Anderson Mesa	LONEOS	EOS	3.8 km	MPC · JPL
163412	2002 RV_{25}	—	September 5, 2002	Socorro	LINEAR	AMO +1km	1.2 km	MPC · JPL
163413	2002 RX_{25}	—	September 2, 2002	Haleakala	NEAT	GEF	1.8 km	MPC · JPL
163414	2002 RP_{26}	—	September 4, 2002	Palomar	NEAT	NAE	6.0 km	MPC · JPL
163415	2002 RW_{34}	—	September 4, 2002	Anderson Mesa	LONEOS	·	3.2 km	MPC · JPL
163416	2002 RO_{37}	—	September 5, 2002	Anderson Mesa	LONEOS	·	4.1 km	MPC · JPL
163417	2002 RC_{40}	—	September 5, 2002	Socorro	LINEAR	AGN	3.9 km	MPC · JPL
163418	2002 RS_{47}	—	September 5, 2002	Socorro	LINEAR	·	3.9 km	MPC · JPL
163419	2002 RK_{52}	—	September 5, 2002	Socorro	LINEAR	·	6.1 km	MPC · JPL
163420	2002 RD_{54}	—	September 5, 2002	Socorro	LINEAR	·	3.7 km	MPC · JPL
163421	2002 RD_{56}	—	September 5, 2002	Anderson Mesa	LONEOS	·	3.4 km	MPC · JPL
163422	2002 RM_{56}	—	September 5, 2002	Anderson Mesa	LONEOS	TEL	2.7 km	MPC · JPL
163423	2002 RD_{57}	—	September 5, 2002	Anderson Mesa	LONEOS	·	2.9 km	MPC · JPL
163424	2002 RC_{58}	—	September 5, 2002	Anderson Mesa	LONEOS	·	3.9 km	MPC · JPL
163425	2002 RE_{61}	—	September 5, 2002	Socorro	LINEAR	H	660 m	MPC · JPL
163426	2002 RP_{61}	—	September 5, 2002	Socorro	LINEAR	·	5.8 km	MPC · JPL
163427	2002 RZ_{61}	—	September 5, 2002	Socorro	LINEAR	·	4.6 km	MPC · JPL
163428	2002 RP_{63}	—	September 5, 2002	Socorro	LINEAR	·	5.5 km	MPC · JPL
163429	2002 RJ_{65}	—	September 5, 2002	Socorro	LINEAR	·	5.7 km	MPC · JPL
163430	2002 RO_{67}	—	September 3, 2002	Palomar	NEAT	·	7.7 km	MPC · JPL
163431	2002 RR_{67}	—	September 3, 2002	Palomar	NEAT	·	3.4 km	MPC · JPL
163432	2002 RG_{69}	—	September 4, 2002	Anderson Mesa	LONEOS	·	5.7 km	MPC · JPL
163433	2002 RW_{70}	—	September 4, 2002	Palomar	NEAT	NAE	6.1 km	MPC · JPL
163434	2002 RY_{72}	—	September 5, 2002	Socorro	LINEAR	·	3.6 km	MPC · JPL
163435	2002 RF_{83}	—	September 5, 2002	Socorro	LINEAR	·	3.9 km	MPC · JPL
163436	2002 RT_{83}	—	September 5, 2002	Socorro	LINEAR	·	4.4 km	MPC · JPL
163437	2002 RM_{87}	—	September 5, 2002	Socorro	LINEAR	·	4.5 km	MPC · JPL
163438	2002 RV_{88}	—	September 5, 2002	Socorro	LINEAR	·	2.7 km	MPC · JPL
163439	2002 RK_{90}	—	September 5, 2002	Socorro	LINEAR	·	3.2 km	MPC · JPL
163440	2002 RM_{90}	—	September 5, 2002	Socorro	LINEAR	HYG	6.5 km	MPC · JPL
163441	2002 RB_{93}	—	September 5, 2002	Anderson Mesa	LONEOS	·	5.2 km	MPC · JPL
163442	2002 RN_{96}	—	September 5, 2002	Socorro	LINEAR	·	4.9 km	MPC · JPL
163443	2002 RL_{97}	—	September 5, 2002	Socorro	LINEAR	·	5.2 km	MPC · JPL
163444	2002 RJ_{103}	—	September 5, 2002	Socorro	LINEAR	EOS	3.4 km	MPC · JPL
163445	2002 RT_{104}	—	September 5, 2002	Socorro	LINEAR	·	5.7 km	MPC · JPL
163446	2002 RY_{104}	—	September 5, 2002	Socorro	LINEAR	·	4.3 km	MPC · JPL
163447	2002 RD_{106}	—	September 5, 2002	Socorro	LINEAR	·	5.8 km	MPC · JPL
163448	2002 RQ_{113}	—	September 5, 2002	Socorro	LINEAR	·	5.1 km	MPC · JPL
163449	2002 RG_{116}	—	September 6, 2002	Socorro	LINEAR	·	5.4 km	MPC · JPL
163450	2002 RZ_{121}	—	September 8, 2002	Haleakala	NEAT	EOS	3.8 km	MPC · JPL
163451	2002 RS_{122}	—	September 8, 2002	Haleakala	NEAT	·	3.6 km	MPC · JPL
163452	2002 RE_{124}	—	September 9, 2002	Palomar	NEAT	·	5.8 km	MPC · JPL
163453	2002 RW_{128}	—	September 10, 2002	Palomar	NEAT	·	3.7 km	MPC · JPL
163454	2002 RN_{129}	—	September 11, 2002	Palomar	NEAT	APO	710 m	MPC · JPL
163455	2002 RQ_{132}	—	September 11, 2002	Palomar	NEAT	·	5.6 km	MPC · JPL
163456	2002 RG_{134}	—	September 10, 2002	Palomar	NEAT	·	4.2 km	MPC · JPL
163457	2002 RV_{134}	—	September 10, 2002	Palomar	NEAT	EOS	3.2 km	MPC · JPL
163458	2002 RS_{138}	—	September 10, 2002	Palomar	NEAT	·	3.4 km	MPC · JPL
163459	2002 RT_{138}	—	September 10, 2002	Palomar	NEAT	EOS	4.2 km	MPC · JPL
163460	2002 RP_{139}	—	September 10, 2002	Palomar	NEAT	EOS	3.7 km	MPC · JPL
163461	2002 RY_{157}	—	September 11, 2002	Palomar	NEAT	·	3.6 km	MPC · JPL
163462	2002 RK_{159}	—	September 11, 2002	Palomar	NEAT	EOS	2.4 km	MPC · JPL
163463	2002 RQ_{161}	—	September 12, 2002	Palomar	NEAT	·	4.3 km	MPC · JPL
163464	2002 RO_{169}	—	September 13, 2002	Palomar	NEAT	·	3.9 km	MPC · JPL
163465	2002 RF_{174}	—	September 13, 2002	Palomar	NEAT	EOS	3.2 km	MPC · JPL
163466	2002 RQ_{175}	—	September 13, 2002	Palomar	NEAT	·	3.6 km	MPC · JPL
163467	2002 RV_{176}	—	September 13, 2002	Palomar	NEAT	·	5.8 km	MPC · JPL
163468	2002 RZ_{177}	—	September 13, 2002	Palomar	NEAT	slow	7.2 km	MPC · JPL
163469	2002 RG_{180}	—	September 14, 2002	Kitt Peak	Spacewatch	·	3.7 km	MPC · JPL
163470 Kenwallis	2002 RQ_{181}	Kenwallis	September 14, 2002	Michael Adrian	Kretlow, M.	·	2.4 km	MPC · JPL
163471	2002 RU_{185}	—	September 12, 2002	Palomar	NEAT	EOS	3.2 km	MPC · JPL
163472	2002 RB_{186}	—	September 12, 2002	Palomar	NEAT	·	4.1 km	MPC · JPL
163473	2002 RB_{204}	—	September 14, 2002	Palomar	NEAT	·	2.9 km	MPC · JPL
163474	2002 RE_{212}	—	September 15, 2002	Palomar	NEAT	CYB	8.3 km	MPC · JPL
163475	2002 RQ_{212}	—	September 15, 2002	Haleakala	NEAT	EOS	4.0 km	MPC · JPL
163476	2002 RU_{218}	—	September 14, 2002	Haleakala	NEAT	·	5.6 km	MPC · JPL
163477	2002 RG_{222}	—	September 15, 2002	Haleakala	NEAT	EOS	3.5 km	MPC · JPL
163478	2002 RQ_{223}	—	September 13, 2002	Haleakala	NEAT	·	3.7 km	MPC · JPL
163479	2002 RM_{229}	—	September 14, 2002	Haleakala	NEAT	TEL	2.0 km	MPC · JPL
163480	2002 RB_{232}	—	September 15, 2002	Haleakala	NEAT	·	3.5 km	MPC · JPL
163481	2002 RW_{235}	—	September 1, 2002	Haleakala	R. Matson	·	4.3 km	MPC · JPL
163482	2002 RH_{237}	—	September 15, 2002	Palomar	R. Matson	·	4.4 km	MPC · JPL
163483	2002 RA_{274}	—	September 4, 2002	Palomar	NEAT	KOR	1.8 km	MPC · JPL
163484	2002 SP_{5}	—	September 27, 2002	Palomar	NEAT	·	7.5 km	MPC · JPL
163485	2002 SB_{6}	—	September 27, 2002	Palomar	NEAT	·	3.9 km	MPC · JPL
163486	2002 SL_{6}	—	September 27, 2002	Palomar	NEAT	·	5.5 km	MPC · JPL
163487	2002 SM_{6}	—	September 27, 2002	Palomar	NEAT	URS	7.5 km	MPC · JPL
163488	2002 ST_{10}	—	September 27, 2002	Palomar	NEAT	·	3.4 km	MPC · JPL
163489	2002 SE_{11}	—	September 27, 2002	Palomar	NEAT	·	3.3 km	MPC · JPL
163490	2002 SX_{11}	—	September 27, 2002	Palomar	NEAT	HYG	5.4 km	MPC · JPL
163491	2002 SM_{13}	—	September 27, 2002	Anderson Mesa	LONEOS	·	2.9 km	MPC · JPL
163492	2002 SC_{26}	—	September 28, 2002	Haleakala	NEAT	·	6.8 km	MPC · JPL
163493	2002 SV_{30}	—	September 28, 2002	Haleakala	NEAT	EOS	4.0 km	MPC · JPL
163494	2002 SB_{31}	—	September 28, 2002	Haleakala	NEAT	·	3.7 km	MPC · JPL
163495	2002 SH_{33}	—	September 28, 2002	Haleakala	NEAT	·	5.4 km	MPC · JPL
163496	2002 SY_{38}	—	September 30, 2002	Socorro	LINEAR	·	3.5 km	MPC · JPL
163497	2002 SX_{40}	—	September 30, 2002	Haleakala	NEAT	·	5.0 km	MPC · JPL
163498	2002 SZ_{40}	—	September 30, 2002	Haleakala	NEAT	·	4.5 km	MPC · JPL
163499	2002 SE_{41}	—	September 30, 2002	Haleakala	NEAT	·	5.9 km	MPC · JPL
163500	2002 SO_{42}	—	September 28, 2002	Haleakala	NEAT	EOS	3.7 km	MPC · JPL

== 163501–163600 ==
back to top

Designation			Discovery			Properties		Ref
Permanent	Provisional	Named after	Date	Site	Discoverer(s)	Category	Diam.	Ref
163501	2002 SG_{44}	—	September 29, 2002	Kitt Peak	Spacewatch	·	3.0 km	MPC · JPL
163502	2002 SA_{46}	—	September 29, 2002	Haleakala	NEAT	·	2.5 km	MPC · JPL
163503	2002 SU_{46}	—	September 29, 2002	Haleakala	NEAT	·	7.7 km	MPC · JPL
163504	2002 SW_{47}	—	September 30, 2002	Socorro	LINEAR	EOS	3.7 km	MPC · JPL
163505	2002 SW_{48}	—	September 30, 2002	Socorro	LINEAR	·	4.5 km	MPC · JPL
163506	2002 SJ_{55}	—	September 30, 2002	Socorro	LINEAR	·	4.5 km	MPC · JPL
163507	2002 SC_{56}	—	September 30, 2002	Socorro	LINEAR	·	5.2 km	MPC · JPL
163508	2002 SE_{59}	—	September 16, 2002	Haleakala	NEAT	·	5.1 km	MPC · JPL
163509	2002 SU_{60}	—	September 16, 2002	Palomar	NEAT	·	5.3 km	MPC · JPL
163510	2002 TR	—	October 1, 2002	Anderson Mesa	LONEOS	·	3.4 km	MPC · JPL
163511	2002 TL_{1}	—	October 1, 2002	Anderson Mesa	LONEOS	KOR	2.2 km	MPC · JPL
163512	2002 TR_{3}	—	October 1, 2002	Anderson Mesa	LONEOS	·	5.9 km	MPC · JPL
163513	2002 TT_{3}	—	October 1, 2002	Anderson Mesa	LONEOS	·	3.2 km	MPC · JPL
163514	2002 TN_{6}	—	October 1, 2002	Anderson Mesa	LONEOS	·	4.0 km	MPC · JPL
163515	2002 TR_{6}	—	October 1, 2002	Socorro	LINEAR	HYG	4.7 km	MPC · JPL
163516	2002 TP_{13}	—	October 1, 2002	Socorro	LINEAR	·	4.1 km	MPC · JPL
163517	2002 TX_{13}	—	October 1, 2002	Socorro	LINEAR	KOR	3.1 km	MPC · JPL
163518	2002 TF_{18}	—	October 2, 2002	Socorro	LINEAR	·	3.0 km	MPC · JPL
163519	2002 TW_{20}	—	October 2, 2002	Socorro	LINEAR	KOR	3.1 km	MPC · JPL
163520	2002 TY_{20}	—	October 2, 2002	Socorro	LINEAR	·	5.8 km	MPC · JPL
163521	2002 TX_{21}	—	October 2, 2002	Socorro	LINEAR	·	2.8 km	MPC · JPL
163522	2002 TD_{22}	—	October 2, 2002	Socorro	LINEAR	·	3.0 km	MPC · JPL
163523	2002 TU_{23}	—	October 2, 2002	Socorro	LINEAR	KOR	2.8 km	MPC · JPL
163524	2002 TA_{25}	—	October 2, 2002	Socorro	LINEAR	·	2.5 km	MPC · JPL
163525	2002 TM_{26}	—	October 2, 2002	Socorro	LINEAR	(1118)	8.9 km	MPC · JPL
163526	2002 TP_{38}	—	October 2, 2002	Socorro	LINEAR	·	5.2 km	MPC · JPL
163527	2002 TA_{40}	—	October 2, 2002	Socorro	LINEAR	·	7.8 km	MPC · JPL
163528	2002 TR_{41}	—	October 2, 2002	Socorro	LINEAR	·	5.1 km	MPC · JPL
163529	2002 TV_{41}	—	October 2, 2002	Socorro	LINEAR	EOS	3.3 km	MPC · JPL
163530	2002 TU_{42}	—	October 2, 2002	Socorro	LINEAR	HYG	5.7 km	MPC · JPL
163531	2002 TP_{44}	—	October 2, 2002	Socorro	LINEAR	·	5.7 km	MPC · JPL
163532	2002 TR_{44}	—	October 2, 2002	Socorro	LINEAR	EOS	3.9 km	MPC · JPL
163533	2002 TY_{46}	—	October 2, 2002	Socorro	LINEAR	·	8.2 km	MPC · JPL
163534	2002 TQ_{51}	—	October 2, 2002	Socorro	LINEAR	TIR	5.5 km	MPC · JPL
163535	2002 TM_{55}	—	October 2, 2002	Haleakala	NEAT	·	2.9 km	MPC · JPL
163536	2002 TT_{55}	—	October 2, 2002	Haleakala	NEAT	·	5.6 km	MPC · JPL
163537	2002 TU_{55}	—	October 2, 2002	Haleakala	NEAT	·	6.0 km	MPC · JPL
163538	2002 TF_{67}	—	October 7, 2002	Palomar	NEAT	T_{j} (2.99)	4.6 km	MPC · JPL
163539	2002 TP_{67}	—	October 4, 2002	Palomar	NEAT	EOS	3.2 km	MPC · JPL
163540	2002 TO_{76}	—	October 1, 2002	Anderson Mesa	LONEOS	·	4.1 km	MPC · JPL
163541	2002 TC_{77}	—	October 1, 2002	Anderson Mesa	LONEOS	EOS	4.1 km	MPC · JPL
163542	2002 TQ_{84}	—	October 2, 2002	Haleakala	NEAT	·	5.9 km	MPC · JPL
163543	2002 TY_{84}	—	October 2, 2002	Haleakala	NEAT	·	5.8 km	MPC · JPL
163544	2002 TK_{85}	—	October 2, 2002	Haleakala	NEAT	·	5.3 km	MPC · JPL
163545	2002 TJ_{88}	—	October 3, 2002	Palomar	NEAT	EMA	6.6 km	MPC · JPL
163546	2002 TL_{90}	—	October 3, 2002	Palomar	NEAT	EOS	3.4 km	MPC · JPL
163547	2002 TC_{94}	—	October 3, 2002	Socorro	LINEAR	·	3.6 km	MPC · JPL
163548	2002 TR_{94}	—	October 3, 2002	Socorro	LINEAR	·	3.8 km	MPC · JPL
163549	2002 TW_{94}	—	October 3, 2002	Socorro	LINEAR	·	2.3 km	MPC · JPL
163550	2002 TO_{104}	—	October 4, 2002	Socorro	LINEAR	EOS	4.1 km	MPC · JPL
163551	2002 TF_{107}	—	October 3, 2002	Socorro	LINEAR	·	4.2 km	MPC · JPL
163552	2002 TK_{110}	—	October 2, 2002	Haleakala	NEAT	·	4.6 km	MPC · JPL
163553	2002 TP_{112}	—	October 3, 2002	Palomar	NEAT	·	5.9 km	MPC · JPL
163554	2002 TU_{114}	—	October 3, 2002	Palomar	NEAT	·	7.2 km	MPC · JPL
163555	2002 TK_{117}	—	October 3, 2002	Palomar	NEAT	EOS	3.4 km	MPC · JPL
163556	2002 TY_{118}	—	October 3, 2002	Palomar	NEAT	·	4.0 km	MPC · JPL
163557	2002 TC_{121}	—	October 3, 2002	Palomar	NEAT	·	6.5 km	MPC · JPL
163558	2002 TQ_{123}	—	October 4, 2002	Palomar	NEAT	·	7.7 km	MPC · JPL
163559	2002 TK_{124}	—	October 4, 2002	Palomar	NEAT	·	4.3 km	MPC · JPL
163560	2002 TL_{124}	—	October 4, 2002	Palomar	NEAT	·	5.1 km	MPC · JPL
163561	2002 TN_{125}	—	October 4, 2002	Palomar	NEAT	·	3.9 km	MPC · JPL
163562	2002 TB_{127}	—	October 4, 2002	Palomar	NEAT	EOS	4.0 km	MPC · JPL
163563	2002 TM_{127}	—	October 4, 2002	Palomar	NEAT	·	6.8 km	MPC · JPL
163564	2002 TV_{128}	—	October 4, 2002	Palomar	NEAT	EOS	4.8 km	MPC · JPL
163565	2002 TK_{130}	—	October 4, 2002	Socorro	LINEAR	·	4.5 km	MPC · JPL
163566	2002 TS_{134}	—	October 4, 2002	Palomar	NEAT	·	3.6 km	MPC · JPL
163567	2002 TU_{135}	—	October 4, 2002	Anderson Mesa	LONEOS	·	4.8 km	MPC · JPL
163568	2002 TF_{139}	—	October 4, 2002	Anderson Mesa	LONEOS	·	4.6 km	MPC · JPL
163569	2002 TY_{142}	—	October 4, 2002	Socorro	LINEAR	EOS	3.6 km	MPC · JPL
163570	2002 TJ_{143}	—	October 4, 2002	Socorro	LINEAR	·	4.2 km	MPC · JPL
163571	2002 TT_{143}	—	October 4, 2002	Socorro	LINEAR	·	4.7 km	MPC · JPL
163572	2002 TN_{157}	—	October 5, 2002	Palomar	NEAT	EOS	3.9 km	MPC · JPL
163573	2002 TL_{159}	—	October 5, 2002	Palomar	NEAT	·	6.7 km	MPC · JPL
163574	2002 TO_{159}	—	October 5, 2002	Palomar	NEAT	·	5.1 km	MPC · JPL
163575	2002 TE_{160}	—	October 5, 2002	Palomar	NEAT	·	5.1 km	MPC · JPL
163576	2002 TE_{164}	—	October 5, 2002	Palomar	NEAT	TIR	4.6 km	MPC · JPL
163577	2002 TL_{169}	—	October 3, 2002	Palomar	NEAT	EOS	4.2 km	MPC · JPL
163578	2002 TK_{173}	—	October 4, 2002	Socorro	LINEAR	TEL	2.9 km	MPC · JPL
163579	2002 TV_{174}	—	October 4, 2002	Socorro	LINEAR	·	7.2 km	MPC · JPL
163580	2002 TR_{180}	—	October 14, 2002	Socorro	LINEAR	TIR	5.3 km	MPC · JPL
163581	2002 TA_{183}	—	October 4, 2002	Socorro	LINEAR	DOR	7.0 km	MPC · JPL
163582	2002 TD_{184}	—	October 4, 2002	Socorro	LINEAR	EOS	3.2 km	MPC · JPL
163583	2002 TS_{185}	—	October 4, 2002	Socorro	LINEAR	·	6.8 km	MPC · JPL
163584	2002 TG_{188}	—	October 4, 2002	Palomar	NEAT	·	4.4 km	MPC · JPL
163585	2002 TO_{188}	—	October 4, 2002	Socorro	LINEAR	·	4.6 km	MPC · JPL
163586	2002 TQ_{189}	—	October 5, 2002	Socorro	LINEAR	·	5.5 km	MPC · JPL
163587	2002 TX_{190}	—	October 1, 2002	Socorro	LINEAR	·	7.4 km	MPC · JPL
163588	2002 TR_{191}	—	October 5, 2002	Anderson Mesa	LONEOS	·	3.9 km	MPC · JPL
163589	2002 TG_{192}	—	October 5, 2002	Anderson Mesa	LONEOS	·	4.6 km	MPC · JPL
163590	2002 TN_{192}	—	October 5, 2002	Anderson Mesa	LONEOS	·	7.8 km	MPC · JPL
163591	2002 TO_{202}	—	October 4, 2002	Socorro	LINEAR	·	3.8 km	MPC · JPL
163592	2002 TS_{203}	—	October 4, 2002	Socorro	LINEAR	·	5.3 km	MPC · JPL
163593	2002 TA_{206}	—	October 4, 2002	Socorro	LINEAR	·	6.0 km	MPC · JPL
163594	2002 TH_{207}	—	October 4, 2002	Socorro	LINEAR	slow	3.6 km	MPC · JPL
163595	2002 TM_{209}	—	October 6, 2002	Socorro	LINEAR	EOS	2.8 km	MPC · JPL
163596	2002 TS_{214}	—	October 4, 2002	Socorro	LINEAR	·	4.6 km	MPC · JPL
163597	2002 TO_{225}	—	October 8, 2002	Anderson Mesa	LONEOS	·	7.2 km	MPC · JPL
163598	2002 TQ_{230}	—	October 7, 2002	Palomar	NEAT	·	3.2 km	MPC · JPL
163599	2002 TG_{236}	—	October 6, 2002	Socorro	LINEAR	·	8.7 km	MPC · JPL
163600	2002 TF_{238}	—	October 7, 2002	Anderson Mesa	LONEOS	EOS	4.7 km	MPC · JPL

== 163601–163700 ==
back to top

Designation			Discovery			Properties		Ref
Permanent	Provisional	Named after	Date	Site	Discoverer(s)	Category	Diam.	Ref
163601	2002 TJ_{238}	—	October 7, 2002	Anderson Mesa	LONEOS	·	4.5 km	MPC · JPL
163602	2002 TW_{238}	—	October 7, 2002	Socorro	LINEAR	·	4.0 km	MPC · JPL
163603	2002 TD_{242}	—	October 9, 2002	Anderson Mesa	LONEOS	·	4.6 km	MPC · JPL
163604	2002 TM_{242}	—	October 9, 2002	Anderson Mesa	LONEOS	EOS	3.6 km	MPC · JPL
163605	2002 TU_{243}	—	October 9, 2002	Kitt Peak	Spacewatch	·	2.6 km	MPC · JPL
163606	2002 TY_{257}	—	October 9, 2002	Socorro	LINEAR	·	5.1 km	MPC · JPL
163607	2002 TD_{258}	—	October 9, 2002	Socorro	LINEAR	·	5.3 km	MPC · JPL
163608	2002 TW_{259}	—	October 9, 2002	Socorro	LINEAR	·	4.3 km	MPC · JPL
163609	2002 TC_{260}	—	October 9, 2002	Socorro	LINEAR	·	3.6 km	MPC · JPL
163610	2002 TX_{260}	—	October 9, 2002	Socorro	LINEAR	·	8.2 km	MPC · JPL
163611	2002 TW_{263}	—	October 10, 2002	Socorro	LINEAR	·	5.0 km	MPC · JPL
163612	2002 TW_{276}	—	October 9, 2002	Socorro	LINEAR	·	4.9 km	MPC · JPL
163613	2002 TM_{278}	—	October 10, 2002	Socorro	LINEAR	·	7.3 km	MPC · JPL
163614	2002 TQ_{280}	—	October 10, 2002	Socorro	LINEAR	·	5.3 km	MPC · JPL
163615	2002 TG_{281}	—	October 10, 2002	Socorro	LINEAR	·	3.8 km	MPC · JPL
163616	2002 TO_{281}	—	October 10, 2002	Socorro	LINEAR	·	5.9 km	MPC · JPL
163617	2002 TC_{282}	—	October 10, 2002	Socorro	LINEAR	HYG	5.3 km	MPC · JPL
163618	2002 TG_{282}	—	October 10, 2002	Socorro	LINEAR	·	8.2 km	MPC · JPL
163619	2002 TN_{286}	—	October 10, 2002	Socorro	LINEAR	·	6.0 km	MPC · JPL
163620	2002 TE_{287}	—	October 10, 2002	Socorro	LINEAR	·	8.0 km	MPC · JPL
163621	2002 TP_{294}	—	October 12, 2002	Socorro	LINEAR	EOS	5.6 km	MPC · JPL
163622	2002 TQ_{300}	—	October 15, 2002	Palomar	NEAT	·	5.0 km	MPC · JPL
163623 Miknaitis	2002 TR_{346}	Miknaitis	October 5, 2002	Apache Point	SDSS	·	6.8 km	MPC · JPL
163624 Moorthy	2002 TD_{366}	Moorthy	October 10, 2002	Apache Point	SDSS	·	4.6 km	MPC · JPL
163625 Munn	2002 TU_{367}	Munn	October 10, 2002	Apache Point	SDSS	·	5.2 km	MPC · JPL
163626 Glatfelter	2002 UV	Glatfelter	October 27, 2002	Wrightwood	J. W. Young	THM	5.0 km	MPC · JPL
163627	2002 UB_{7}	—	October 28, 2002	Palomar	NEAT	·	6.3 km	MPC · JPL
163628	2002 UH_{8}	—	October 28, 2002	Palomar	NEAT	·	4.2 km	MPC · JPL
163629	2002 UU_{9}	—	October 26, 2002	Haleakala	NEAT	·	4.5 km	MPC · JPL
163630	2002 UH_{11}	—	October 29, 2002	Nogales	Tenagra II	·	2.8 km	MPC · JPL
163631	2002 UN_{13}	—	October 28, 2002	Haleakala	NEAT	EOS · slow	3.8 km	MPC · JPL
163632	2002 UG_{18}	—	October 30, 2002	Palomar	NEAT	·	7.0 km	MPC · JPL
163633	2002 UT_{18}	—	October 30, 2002	Palomar	NEAT	VER	7.0 km	MPC · JPL
163634	2002 UW_{25}	—	October 30, 2002	Haleakala	NEAT	VER	4.9 km	MPC · JPL
163635	2002 UL_{26}	—	October 31, 2002	Socorro	LINEAR	·	4.8 km	MPC · JPL
163636	2002 UZ_{27}	—	October 30, 2002	Palomar	NEAT	·	3.6 km	MPC · JPL
163637	2002 UU_{38}	—	October 31, 2002	Palomar	NEAT	THM	6.1 km	MPC · JPL
163638	2002 UN_{46}	—	October 31, 2002	Kvistaberg	Uppsala-DLR Asteroid Survey	KOR	2.2 km	MPC · JPL
163639 Tomnash	2002 UN_{51}	Tomnash	October 29, 2002	Apache Point	SDSS	·	5.9 km	MPC · JPL
163640 Newberg	2002 UB_{59}	Newberg	October 29, 2002	Apache Point	SDSS	·	3.7 km	MPC · JPL
163641 Nichol	2002 UC_{68}	Nichol	October 30, 2002	Apache Point	SDSS	EOS	2.3 km	MPC · JPL
163642	2002 UA_{70}	—	October 29, 2002	Palomar	NEAT	·	5.7 km	MPC · JPL
163643	2002 VO_{2}	—	November 1, 2002	Socorro	LINEAR	THM	3.3 km	MPC · JPL
163644	2002 VS_{3}	—	November 1, 2002	Palomar	NEAT	·	3.6 km	MPC · JPL
163645	2002 VB_{10}	—	November 1, 2002	Palomar	NEAT	·	4.1 km	MPC · JPL
163646	2002 VQ_{12}	—	November 4, 2002	Anderson Mesa	LONEOS	·	3.9 km	MPC · JPL
163647	2002 VE_{25}	—	November 5, 2002	Kitt Peak	Spacewatch	BRA	2.4 km	MPC · JPL
163648	2002 VV_{25}	—	November 5, 2002	Socorro	LINEAR	HYG	4.9 km	MPC · JPL
163649	2002 VR_{36}	—	November 5, 2002	Anderson Mesa	LONEOS	·	2.8 km	MPC · JPL
163650	2002 VB_{46}	—	November 5, 2002	Socorro	LINEAR	·	6.1 km	MPC · JPL
163651	2002 VO_{62}	—	November 5, 2002	Palomar	NEAT	·	5.7 km	MPC · JPL
163652	2002 VQ_{68}	—	November 7, 2002	Socorro	LINEAR	·	4.2 km	MPC · JPL
163653	2002 VK_{70}	—	November 7, 2002	Socorro	LINEAR	HYG	5.1 km	MPC · JPL
163654	2002 VT_{73}	—	November 7, 2002	Socorro	LINEAR	·	5.1 km	MPC · JPL
163655	2002 VH_{79}	—	November 7, 2002	Socorro	LINEAR	·	4.3 km	MPC · JPL
163656	2002 VX_{85}	—	November 11, 2002	Socorro	LINEAR	·	9.2 km	MPC · JPL
163657	2002 VB_{86}	—	November 8, 2002	Socorro	LINEAR	·	4.5 km	MPC · JPL
163658	2002 VB_{87}	—	November 8, 2002	Socorro	LINEAR	·	4.0 km	MPC · JPL
163659	2002 VX_{111}	—	November 13, 2002	Kitt Peak	Spacewatch	·	2.1 km	MPC · JPL
163660	2002 VQ_{116}	—	November 13, 2002	Palomar	NEAT	·	6.9 km	MPC · JPL
163661	2002 VQ_{120}	—	November 12, 2002	Palomar	NEAT	EOS	4.7 km	MPC · JPL
163662	2002 VR_{120}	—	November 12, 2002	Palomar	NEAT	·	6.5 km	MPC · JPL
163663	2002 VV_{122}	—	November 13, 2002	Palomar	NEAT	·	4.9 km	MPC · JPL
163664	2002 VD_{127}	—	November 13, 2002	Palomar	NEAT	·	4.8 km	MPC · JPL
163665	2002 VN_{131}	—	November 13, 2002	Palomar	S. F. Hönig	·	3.2 km	MPC · JPL
163666	2002 WD	—	November 16, 2002	Socorro	LINEAR	H	1.1 km	MPC · JPL
163667	2002 WC_{1}	—	November 22, 2002	Palomar	NEAT	AMO · critical	380 m	MPC · JPL
163668	2002 WF_{7}	—	November 24, 2002	Palomar	NEAT	·	4.1 km	MPC · JPL
163669	2002 WK_{8}	—	November 24, 2002	Palomar	NEAT	·	3.9 km	MPC · JPL
163670	2002 WL_{12}	—	November 27, 2002	Anderson Mesa	LONEOS	·	3.8 km	MPC · JPL
163671	2002 WD_{13}	—	November 30, 2002	Socorro	LINEAR	EOS	3.7 km	MPC · JPL
163672	2002 XO_{3}	—	December 2, 2002	Socorro	LINEAR	·	4.9 km	MPC · JPL
163673	2002 XS_{7}	—	December 2, 2002	Socorro	LINEAR	·	5.5 km	MPC · JPL
163674	2002 XP_{12}	—	December 3, 2002	Palomar	NEAT	·	5.1 km	MPC · JPL
163675	2002 XC_{31}	—	December 6, 2002	Socorro	LINEAR	·	5.5 km	MPC · JPL
163676	2002 XG_{62}	—	December 11, 2002	Socorro	LINEAR	·	5.5 km	MPC · JPL
163677	2002 XP_{62}	—	December 11, 2002	Socorro	LINEAR	slow	4.5 km	MPC · JPL
163678	2002 XT_{65}	—	December 12, 2002	Socorro	LINEAR	H	770 m	MPC · JPL
163679	2002 XG_{84}	—	December 14, 2002	Socorro	LINEAR	APO	490 m	MPC · JPL
163680	2002 XK_{84}	—	December 14, 2002	Socorro	LINEAR	T_{j} (2.99)	10 km	MPC · JPL
163681	2002 XM_{101}	—	December 5, 2002	Socorro	LINEAR	THM	3.3 km	MPC · JPL
163682	2002 XV_{109}	—	December 6, 2002	Socorro	LINEAR	EOS	3.2 km	MPC · JPL
163683	2002 YP_{2}	—	December 28, 2002	Socorro	LINEAR	APO · PHA	550 m	MPC · JPL
163684	2002 YX_{22}	—	December 31, 2002	Socorro	LINEAR	·	5.8 km	MPC · JPL
163685	2002 YK_{33}	—	December 31, 2002	Anderson Mesa	LONEOS	·	4.3 km	MPC · JPL
163686	2003 AM_{21}	—	January 5, 2003	Socorro	LINEAR	NYS	2.7 km	MPC · JPL
163687	2003 AC_{35}	—	January 7, 2003	Socorro	LINEAR	·	4.1 km	MPC · JPL
163688	2003 AC_{92}	—	January 7, 2003	Socorro	LINEAR	LIX	6.3 km	MPC · JPL
163689	2003 BG_{2}	—	January 25, 2003	Palomar	NEAT	·	4.5 km	MPC · JPL
163690	2003 BJ_{7}	—	January 25, 2003	Palomar	NEAT	H	1.1 km	MPC · JPL
163691	2003 BB_{43}	—	January 28, 2003	Socorro	LINEAR	AMO +1km	3.4 km	MPC · JPL
163692	2003 CY_{18}	—	February 9, 2003	Haleakala	NEAT	APO +1km	790 m	MPC · JPL
163693 Atira	2003 CP_{20}	Atira	February 11, 2003	Socorro	LINEAR	IEO +1km · moon	1.9 km	MPC · JPL
163694	2003 DP_{13}	—	February 27, 2003	Haleakala	NEAT	AMO +1km	830 m	MPC · JPL
163695	2003 EB_{7}	—	March 6, 2003	Anderson Mesa	LONEOS	HYG	4.4 km	MPC · JPL
163696	2003 EB_{50}	—	March 10, 2003	Anderson Mesa	LONEOS	APO +1km	1.8 km	MPC · JPL
163697	2003 EF_{54}	—	March 12, 2003	Socorro	LINEAR	APO · PHA	340 m	MPC · JPL
163698	2003 EA_{62}	—	March 7, 2003	Kitt Peak	Spacewatch	·	1.7 km	MPC · JPL
163699	2003 FW_{9}	—	March 22, 2003	Haleakala	NEAT	·	2.4 km	MPC · JPL
163700	2003 FP_{49}	—	March 24, 2003	Haleakala	NEAT	·	1.8 km	MPC · JPL

== 163701–163800 ==
back to top

Designation			Discovery			Properties		Ref
Permanent	Provisional	Named after	Date	Site	Discoverer(s)	Category	Diam.	Ref
163701	2003 FC_{53}	—	March 25, 2003	Haleakala	NEAT	·	1.4 km	MPC · JPL
163702	2003 FR_{72}	—	March 26, 2003	Palomar	NEAT	L4	15 km	MPC · JPL
163703	2003 FY_{82}	—	March 27, 2003	Palomar	NEAT	·	1.4 km	MPC · JPL
163704	2003 FL_{100}	—	March 31, 2003	Anderson Mesa	LONEOS	·	1.4 km	MPC · JPL
163705	2003 FR_{107}	—	March 30, 2003	Socorro	LINEAR	·	1.9 km	MPC · JPL
163706	2003 FF_{108}	—	March 29, 2003	Anderson Mesa	LONEOS	·	1.4 km	MPC · JPL
163707	2003 FS_{113}	—	March 31, 2003	Socorro	LINEAR	·	1.1 km	MPC · JPL
163708	2003 FF_{117}	—	March 24, 2003	Kitt Peak	Spacewatch	·	1.3 km	MPC · JPL
163709	2003 FY_{118}	—	March 26, 2003	Anderson Mesa	LONEOS	·	1.3 km	MPC · JPL
163710	2003 GK_{5}	—	April 1, 2003	Socorro	LINEAR	·	1.2 km	MPC · JPL
163711	2003 GH_{6}	—	April 2, 2003	Socorro	LINEAR	·	1.2 km	MPC · JPL
163712	2003 GB_{7}	—	April 1, 2003	Socorro	LINEAR	·	880 m	MPC · JPL
163713	2003 GW_{7}	—	April 2, 2003	Haleakala	NEAT	·	1.5 km	MPC · JPL
163714	2003 GT_{23}	—	April 5, 2003	Kitt Peak	Spacewatch	·	1.5 km	MPC · JPL
163715	2003 HQ_{2}	—	April 21, 2003	Catalina	CSS	·	1.6 km	MPC · JPL
163716	2003 HA_{5}	—	April 24, 2003	Anderson Mesa	LONEOS	V	1.2 km	MPC · JPL
163717	2003 HC_{8}	—	April 24, 2003	Anderson Mesa	LONEOS	·	1.3 km	MPC · JPL
163718	2003 HJ_{21}	—	April 26, 2003	Kitt Peak	Spacewatch	·	1.2 km	MPC · JPL
163719	2003 HM_{21}	—	April 26, 2003	Kitt Peak	Spacewatch	·	1.5 km	MPC · JPL
163720	2003 HW_{25}	—	April 25, 2003	Kitt Peak	Spacewatch	·	1.1 km	MPC · JPL
163721	2003 HQ_{27}	—	April 25, 2003	Kitt Peak	Spacewatch	·	1.2 km	MPC · JPL
163722	2003 HC_{29}	—	April 28, 2003	Socorro	LINEAR	·	1.3 km	MPC · JPL
163723	2003 HA_{39}	—	April 29, 2003	Socorro	LINEAR	·	1.3 km	MPC · JPL
163724	2003 HY_{47}	—	April 30, 2003	Socorro	LINEAR	·	1.6 km	MPC · JPL
163725	2003 HA_{52}	—	April 30, 2003	Haleakala	NEAT	(2076)	1.3 km	MPC · JPL
163726	2003 HX_{54}	—	April 24, 2003	Campo Imperatore	CINEOS	V	1.2 km	MPC · JPL
163727	2003 JV_{2}	—	May 1, 2003	Haleakala	NEAT	V	980 m	MPC · JPL
163728	2003 JP_{3}	—	May 2, 2003	Kitt Peak	Spacewatch	·	1.1 km	MPC · JPL
163729	2003 JQ_{7}	—	May 2, 2003	Socorro	LINEAR	(883)	970 m	MPC · JPL
163730	2003 JT_{15}	—	May 6, 2003	Kitt Peak	Spacewatch	·	1.2 km	MPC · JPL
163731	2003 KD	—	May 20, 2003	Tenagra II	M. Schwartz, P. R. Holvorcem	L4	17 km	MPC · JPL
163732	2003 KP_{2}	—	May 22, 2003	Socorro	LINEAR	T_{j} (2.63) · APO +1km · slow	2.8 km	MPC · JPL
163733	2003 KJ_{4}	—	May 20, 2003	Tenagra II	M. Schwartz, P. R. Holvorcem	·	1.4 km	MPC · JPL
163734	2003 KD_{6}	—	May 25, 2003	Kitt Peak	Spacewatch	·	1.4 km	MPC · JPL
163735	2003 KN_{7}	—	May 25, 2003	Kitt Peak	Spacewatch	·	1.6 km	MPC · JPL
163736	2003 KX_{10}	—	May 26, 2003	Kitt Peak	Spacewatch	NYS	1.4 km	MPC · JPL
163737	2003 KL_{16}	—	May 26, 2003	Haleakala	NEAT	NYS	1.9 km	MPC · JPL
163738	2003 KZ_{17}	—	May 27, 2003	Haleakala	NEAT	·	1.4 km	MPC · JPL
163739	2003 KE_{19}	—	May 30, 2003	Socorro	LINEAR	·	1.2 km	MPC · JPL
163740	2003 LU_{2}	—	June 1, 2003	Reedy Creek	J. Broughton	·	1.3 km	MPC · JPL
163741	2003 LV_{3}	—	June 1, 2003	Reedy Creek	J. Broughton	NYS	2.6 km	MPC · JPL
163742	2003 MQ	—	June 21, 2003	Socorro	LINEAR	·	6.2 km	MPC · JPL
163743	2003 MN_{3}	—	June 25, 2003	Socorro	LINEAR	slow	1.3 km	MPC · JPL
163744	2003 MY_{3}	—	June 26, 2003	Reedy Creek	J. Broughton	NYS	1.8 km	MPC · JPL
163745	2003 MY_{8}	—	June 28, 2003	Socorro	LINEAR	·	3.1 km	MPC · JPL
163746	2003 MO_{11}	—	June 25, 2003	Socorro	LINEAR	NYS	2.2 km	MPC · JPL
163747	2003 ND_{2}	—	July 2, 2003	Socorro	LINEAR	NYS	1.5 km	MPC · JPL
163748	2003 NM_{2}	—	July 3, 2003	Reedy Creek	J. Broughton	·	2.0 km	MPC · JPL
163749	2003 NR_{7}	—	July 9, 2003	Campo Imperatore	CINEOS	NYS	2.4 km	MPC · JPL
163750	2003 NO_{9}	—	July 2, 2003	Socorro	LINEAR	·	2.5 km	MPC · JPL
163751	2003 OQ	—	July 20, 2003	Reedy Creek	J. Broughton	NYS	2.4 km	MPC · JPL
163752	2003 OC_{1}	—	July 22, 2003	Socorro	LINEAR	PHO	2.3 km	MPC · JPL
163753	2003 OZ_{4}	—	July 22, 2003	Haleakala	NEAT	NYS	2.0 km	MPC · JPL
163754	2003 OD_{6}	—	July 21, 2003	Campo Imperatore	CINEOS	·	1.5 km	MPC · JPL
163755	2003 OG_{6}	—	July 22, 2003	Haleakala	NEAT	MAS	1.1 km	MPC · JPL
163756	2003 OQ_{7}	—	July 25, 2003	Palomar	NEAT	·	2.2 km	MPC · JPL
163757	2003 OJ_{9}	—	July 23, 2003	Palomar	NEAT	·	2.0 km	MPC · JPL
163758	2003 OS_{13}	—	July 29, 2003	Socorro	LINEAR	APO +1km	1.2 km	MPC · JPL
163759	2003 OV_{13}	—	July 25, 2003	Socorro	LINEAR	·	2.2 km	MPC · JPL
163760	2003 OR_{14}	—	July 22, 2003	Palomar	NEAT	AMO +1km	2.3 km	MPC · JPL
163761	2003 OV_{14}	—	July 22, 2003	Palomar	NEAT	·	2.3 km	MPC · JPL
163762	2003 OH_{20}	—	July 25, 2003	Wise	Polishook, D.	·	3.3 km	MPC · JPL
163763	2003 OD_{23}	—	July 30, 2003	Socorro	LINEAR	·	2.8 km	MPC · JPL
163764	2003 OX_{27}	—	July 24, 2003	Palomar	NEAT	·	2.6 km	MPC · JPL
163765	2003 OY_{27}	—	July 24, 2003	Palomar	NEAT	NYS	2.2 km	MPC · JPL
163766	2003 OL_{28}	—	July 24, 2003	Palomar	NEAT	·	1.7 km	MPC · JPL
163767	2003 PP_{2}	—	August 2, 2003	Haleakala	NEAT	·	2.0 km	MPC · JPL
163768	2003 PS_{2}	—	August 2, 2003	Haleakala	NEAT	·	2.1 km	MPC · JPL
163769	2003 PA_{4}	—	August 2, 2003	Haleakala	NEAT	V	1.3 km	MPC · JPL
163770	2003 PX_{4}	—	August 3, 2003	Haleakala	NEAT	·	2.2 km	MPC · JPL
163771	2003 PT_{8}	—	August 4, 2003	Socorro	LINEAR	NYS	2.0 km	MPC · JPL
163772	2003 PU_{12}	—	August 2, 2003	Haleakala	NEAT	NYS	2.5 km	MPC · JPL
163773	2003 QZ_{1}	—	August 19, 2003	Campo Imperatore	CINEOS	·	1.4 km	MPC · JPL
163774	2003 QZ_{3}	—	August 18, 2003	Haleakala	NEAT	·	2.2 km	MPC · JPL
163775	2003 QR_{8}	—	August 20, 2003	Črni Vrh	Skvarč, J.	·	1.8 km	MPC · JPL
163776	2003 QL_{9}	—	August 20, 2003	Campo Imperatore	CINEOS	·	3.1 km	MPC · JPL
163777	2003 QJ_{13}	—	August 22, 2003	Haleakala	NEAT	·	2.9 km	MPC · JPL
163778	2003 QX_{16}	—	August 21, 2003	Campo Imperatore	CINEOS	·	1.5 km	MPC · JPL
163779	2003 QQ_{19}	—	August 22, 2003	Palomar	NEAT	·	2.8 km	MPC · JPL
163780	2003 QZ_{19}	—	August 22, 2003	Palomar	NEAT	·	2.0 km	MPC · JPL
163781	2003 QA_{23}	—	August 20, 2003	Palomar	NEAT	·	3.4 km	MPC · JPL
163782	2003 QZ_{26}	—	August 22, 2003	Haleakala	NEAT	·	3.2 km	MPC · JPL
163783	2003 QU_{33}	—	August 22, 2003	Palomar	NEAT	·	1.5 km	MPC · JPL
163784	2003 QY_{36}	—	August 22, 2003	Socorro	LINEAR	MAS	1.5 km	MPC · JPL
163785	2003 QJ_{37}	—	August 22, 2003	Palomar	NEAT	·	1.9 km	MPC · JPL
163786	2003 QJ_{38}	—	August 22, 2003	Socorro	LINEAR	MAS	1.2 km	MPC · JPL
163787	2003 QD_{39}	—	August 22, 2003	Palomar	NEAT	·	1.9 km	MPC · JPL
163788	2003 QA_{40}	—	August 22, 2003	Socorro	LINEAR	EUN	2.2 km	MPC · JPL
163789	2003 QS_{42}	—	August 22, 2003	Palomar	NEAT	·	4.5 km	MPC · JPL
163790	2003 QE_{43}	—	August 22, 2003	Palomar	NEAT	·	1.4 km	MPC · JPL
163791	2003 QW_{44}	—	August 23, 2003	Socorro	LINEAR	NYS	1.8 km	MPC · JPL
163792	2003 QV_{45}	—	August 23, 2003	Socorro	LINEAR	NYS	2.3 km	MPC · JPL
163793	2003 QM_{51}	—	August 22, 2003	Haleakala	NEAT	·	3.6 km	MPC · JPL
163794	2003 QE_{54}	—	August 23, 2003	Socorro	LINEAR	·	2.5 km	MPC · JPL
163795	2003 QN_{57}	—	August 23, 2003	Socorro	LINEAR	·	2.1 km	MPC · JPL
163796	2003 QU_{58}	—	August 23, 2003	Palomar	NEAT	·	1.6 km	MPC · JPL
163797	2003 QF_{62}	—	August 23, 2003	Socorro	LINEAR	·	3.0 km	MPC · JPL
163798	2003 QU_{64}	—	August 23, 2003	Socorro	LINEAR	EUN	2.0 km	MPC · JPL
163799	2003 QR_{69}	—	August 24, 2003	Socorro	LINEAR	·	1.9 km	MPC · JPL
163800 Richardnorton	2003 QS_{69}	Richardnorton	August 26, 2003	Drebach	~Knöfel, A.	·	2.9 km	MPC · JPL

== 163801–163900 ==
back to top

Designation			Discovery			Properties		Ref
Permanent	Provisional	Named after	Date	Site	Discoverer(s)	Category	Diam.	Ref
163801	2003 QQ_{73}	—	August 26, 2003	Črni Vrh	Mikuž, H.	·	1.5 km	MPC · JPL
163802	2003 QG_{74}	—	August 24, 2003	Socorro	LINEAR	·	1.9 km	MPC · JPL
163803	2003 QO_{79}	—	August 26, 2003	Socorro	LINEAR	·	5.0 km	MPC · JPL
163804	2003 QQ_{88}	—	August 25, 2003	Socorro	LINEAR	·	3.1 km	MPC · JPL
163805	2003 QX_{92}	—	August 27, 2003	Palomar	NEAT	·	2.0 km	MPC · JPL
163806	2003 QJ_{94}	—	August 28, 2003	Haleakala	NEAT	·	3.7 km	MPC · JPL
163807	2003 QO_{100}	—	August 28, 2003	Palomar	NEAT	·	2.3 km	MPC · JPL
163808	2003 QC_{104}	—	August 31, 2003	Haleakala	NEAT	·	3.8 km	MPC · JPL
163809	2003 QO_{105}	—	August 31, 2003	Haleakala	NEAT	·	3.7 km	MPC · JPL
163810	2003 QQ_{109}	—	August 31, 2003	Haleakala	NEAT	·	2.2 km	MPC · JPL
163811	2003 QH_{114}	—	August 21, 2003	Socorro	LINEAR	·	3.2 km	MPC · JPL
163812	2003 RR_{1}	—	September 2, 2003	Reedy Creek	J. Broughton	·	2.0 km	MPC · JPL
163813	2003 RW_{1}	—	September 2, 2003	Socorro	LINEAR	·	3.3 km	MPC · JPL
163814	2003 RB_{2}	—	September 3, 2003	Haleakala	NEAT	·	3.1 km	MPC · JPL
163815	2003 RR_{2}	—	September 1, 2003	Socorro	LINEAR	EUN	1.9 km	MPC · JPL
163816	2003 RD_{4}	—	September 1, 2003	Socorro	LINEAR	·	4.4 km	MPC · JPL
163817	2003 RP_{5}	—	September 3, 2003	Socorro	LINEAR	·	3.5 km	MPC · JPL
163818	2003 RX_{7}	—	September 6, 2003	Anderson Mesa	LONEOS	APO · PHA	390 m	MPC · JPL
163819 Teleki	2003 RN_{8}	Teleki	September 7, 2003	Piszkéstető	K. Sárneczky, B. Sipőcz	·	1.5 km	MPC · JPL
163820	2003 RU_{9}	—	September 7, 2003	Socorro	LINEAR	·	2.9 km	MPC · JPL
163821	2003 RJ_{18}	—	September 13, 2003	Anderson Mesa	LONEOS	·	2.2 km	MPC · JPL
163822	2003 RY_{21}	—	September 14, 2003	Haleakala	NEAT	·	2.1 km	MPC · JPL
163823	2003 RJ_{24}	—	September 15, 2003	Anderson Mesa	LONEOS	·	1.5 km	MPC · JPL
163824	2003 SE_{5}	—	September 16, 2003	Kitt Peak	Spacewatch	·	1.7 km	MPC · JPL
163825	2003 SH_{5}	—	September 16, 2003	Kitt Peak	Spacewatch	·	3.3 km	MPC · JPL
163826	2003 SK_{6}	—	September 16, 2003	Haleakala	NEAT	·	5.6 km	MPC · JPL
163827	2003 SF_{12}	—	September 16, 2003	Kitt Peak	Spacewatch	·	1.6 km	MPC · JPL
163828	2003 SY_{21}	—	September 16, 2003	Socorro	LINEAR	·	2.4 km	MPC · JPL
163829	2003 SZ_{21}	—	September 16, 2003	Socorro	LINEAR	EUN	2.0 km	MPC · JPL
163830	2003 SB_{26}	—	September 17, 2003	Haleakala	NEAT	·	1.5 km	MPC · JPL
163831	2003 SB_{27}	—	September 18, 2003	Socorro	LINEAR	·	2.2 km	MPC · JPL
163832	2003 SC_{27}	—	September 18, 2003	Socorro	LINEAR	·	1.8 km	MPC · JPL
163833	2003 SE_{30}	—	September 18, 2003	Palomar	NEAT	·	2.0 km	MPC · JPL
163834	2003 SM_{36}	—	September 17, 2003	Kitt Peak	Spacewatch	EUN	2.1 km	MPC · JPL
163835	2003 SF_{41}	—	September 17, 2003	Palomar	NEAT	·	2.7 km	MPC · JPL
163836	2003 SG_{41}	—	September 17, 2003	Palomar	NEAT	·	2.1 km	MPC · JPL
163837	2003 SN_{41}	—	September 17, 2003	Palomar	NEAT	·	1.6 km	MPC · JPL
163838	2003 ST_{41}	—	September 16, 2003	Palomar	NEAT	·	1.5 km	MPC · JPL
163839	2003 ST_{45}	—	September 16, 2003	Anderson Mesa	LONEOS	·	2.2 km	MPC · JPL
163840	2003 SG_{47}	—	September 16, 2003	Anderson Mesa	LONEOS	EUN ·	4.1 km	MPC · JPL
163841	2003 SL_{51}	—	September 18, 2003	Palomar	NEAT	(5)	1.6 km	MPC · JPL
163842	2003 SN_{55}	—	September 16, 2003	Anderson Mesa	LONEOS	·	2.4 km	MPC · JPL
163843	2003 SP_{56}	—	September 16, 2003	Kitt Peak	Spacewatch	·	2.2 km	MPC · JPL
163844	2003 SW_{57}	—	September 16, 2003	Kitt Peak	Spacewatch	NYS	2.0 km	MPC · JPL
163845	2003 SP_{60}	—	September 17, 2003	Kitt Peak	Spacewatch	·	3.3 km	MPC · JPL
163846	2003 SW_{63}	—	September 17, 2003	Campo Imperatore	CINEOS	·	4.5 km	MPC · JPL
163847	2003 SF_{64}	—	September 18, 2003	Campo Imperatore	CINEOS	·	1.4 km	MPC · JPL
163848	2003 SW_{65}	—	September 18, 2003	Socorro	LINEAR	·	1.7 km	MPC · JPL
163849	2003 SG_{69}	—	September 17, 2003	Kitt Peak	Spacewatch	·	2.8 km	MPC · JPL
163850	2003 SM_{79}	—	September 19, 2003	Kitt Peak	Spacewatch	·	2.4 km	MPC · JPL
163851	2003 SK_{80}	—	September 19, 2003	Kitt Peak	Spacewatch	·	1.9 km	MPC · JPL
163852	2003 SV_{81}	—	September 16, 2003	Anderson Mesa	LONEOS	·	3.2 km	MPC · JPL
163853	2003 SW_{82}	—	September 18, 2003	Kitt Peak	Spacewatch	·	920 m	MPC · JPL
163854	2003 SX_{83}	—	September 18, 2003	Palomar	NEAT	·	1.9 km	MPC · JPL
163855	2003 SU_{86}	—	September 17, 2003	Socorro	LINEAR	(5)	1.5 km	MPC · JPL
163856	2003 SP_{90}	—	September 18, 2003	Socorro	LINEAR	V	1.4 km	MPC · JPL
163857	2003 SF_{91}	—	September 18, 2003	Palomar	NEAT	·	2.8 km	MPC · JPL
163858	2003 SU_{93}	—	September 18, 2003	Kitt Peak	Spacewatch	·	2.7 km	MPC · JPL
163859	2003 SK_{95}	—	September 19, 2003	Palomar	NEAT	·	3.6 km	MPC · JPL
163860	2003 SS_{95}	—	September 19, 2003	Palomar	NEAT	·	3.4 km	MPC · JPL
163861	2003 SK_{97}	—	September 19, 2003	Socorro	LINEAR	·	4.1 km	MPC · JPL
163862	2003 SX_{98}	—	September 19, 2003	Haleakala	NEAT	·	5.5 km	MPC · JPL
163863	2003 SS_{101}	—	September 20, 2003	Palomar	NEAT	GEF	2.3 km	MPC · JPL
163864	2003 SN_{102}	—	September 20, 2003	Socorro	LINEAR	EUN	1.9 km	MPC · JPL
163865	2003 SB_{107}	—	September 20, 2003	Palomar	NEAT	(194)	2.1 km	MPC · JPL
163866	2003 SE_{111}	—	September 20, 2003	Haleakala	NEAT	·	3.0 km	MPC · JPL
163867	2003 SM_{132}	—	September 19, 2003	Kitt Peak	Spacewatch	·	2.1 km	MPC · JPL
163868	2003 SF_{134}	—	September 18, 2003	Palomar	NEAT	·	3.5 km	MPC · JPL
163869	2003 SK_{136}	—	September 19, 2003	Campo Imperatore	CINEOS	·	1.7 km	MPC · JPL
163870	2003 SG_{137}	—	September 20, 2003	Palomar	NEAT	·	2.1 km	MPC · JPL
163871	2003 SE_{143}	—	September 20, 2003	Socorro	LINEAR	·	3.7 km	MPC · JPL
163872	2003 SD_{146}	—	September 20, 2003	Haleakala	NEAT	·	2.8 km	MPC · JPL
163873	2003 SN_{147}	—	September 20, 2003	Haleakala	NEAT	·	3.4 km	MPC · JPL
163874	2003 SW_{147}	—	September 21, 2003	Haleakala	NEAT	HNS	2.2 km	MPC · JPL
163875	2003 SE_{162}	—	September 19, 2003	Campo Imperatore	CINEOS	(5)	1.7 km	MPC · JPL
163876	2003 SM_{162}	—	September 19, 2003	Kitt Peak	Spacewatch	HOF	3.8 km	MPC · JPL
163877	2003 SF_{163}	—	September 19, 2003	Kitt Peak	Spacewatch	·	1.9 km	MPC · JPL
163878	2003 SH_{163}	—	September 19, 2003	Kitt Peak	Spacewatch	·	1.6 km	MPC · JPL
163879	2003 SY_{168}	—	September 23, 2003	Haleakala	NEAT	·	3.6 km	MPC · JPL
163880	2003 SK_{169}	—	September 23, 2003	Haleakala	NEAT	·	2.2 km	MPC · JPL
163881	2003 SK_{170}	—	September 23, 2003	Haleakala	NEAT	NYS	1.9 km	MPC · JPL
163882	2003 SE_{173}	—	September 18, 2003	Socorro	LINEAR	·	1.4 km	MPC · JPL
163883	2003 ST_{177}	—	September 18, 2003	Črni Vrh	Mikuž, H.	·	1.4 km	MPC · JPL
163884	2003 SC_{179}	—	September 19, 2003	Socorro	LINEAR	·	1.6 km	MPC · JPL
163885	2003 SN_{180}	—	September 19, 2003	Kitt Peak	Spacewatch	·	2.3 km	MPC · JPL
163886	2003 SJ_{185}	—	September 21, 2003	Haleakala	NEAT	·	3.6 km	MPC · JPL
163887	2003 SL_{189}	—	September 22, 2003	Kitt Peak	Spacewatch	EUN	3.7 km	MPC · JPL
163888	2003 SK_{191}	—	September 18, 2003	Kitt Peak	Spacewatch	·	2.4 km	MPC · JPL
163889	2003 SS_{196}	—	September 20, 2003	Palomar	NEAT	·	4.7 km	MPC · JPL
163890	2003 SC_{199}	—	September 21, 2003	Anderson Mesa	LONEOS	·	4.6 km	MPC · JPL
163891	2003 SJ_{199}	—	September 21, 2003	Anderson Mesa	LONEOS	·	4.5 km	MPC · JPL
163892	2003 SQ_{199}	—	September 21, 2003	Anderson Mesa	LONEOS	·	5.4 km	MPC · JPL
163893	2003 SX_{201}	—	September 26, 2003	Desert Eagle	W. K. Y. Yeung	·	1.5 km	MPC · JPL
163894	2003 SM_{203}	—	September 22, 2003	Anderson Mesa	LONEOS	·	2.6 km	MPC · JPL
163895	2003 SN_{205}	—	September 24, 2003	Haleakala	NEAT	·	1.8 km	MPC · JPL
163896	2003 SQ_{206}	—	September 25, 2003	Haleakala	NEAT	·	2.9 km	MPC · JPL
163897	2003 SP_{211}	—	September 25, 2003	Palomar	NEAT	·	2.8 km	MPC · JPL
163898	2003 SN_{216}	—	September 26, 2003	Socorro	LINEAR	·	3.5 km	MPC · JPL
163899	2003 SD_{220}	—	September 29, 2003	Anderson Mesa	LONEOS	ATE +1km · PHA · slow	790 m	MPC · JPL
163900	2003 SD_{222}	—	September 26, 2003	Desert Eagle	W. K. Y. Yeung	·	2.6 km	MPC · JPL

== 163901–164000 ==
back to top

Designation			Discovery			Properties		Ref
Permanent	Provisional	Named after	Date	Site	Discoverer(s)	Category	Diam.	Ref
163901	2003 SG_{222}	—	September 27, 2003	Desert Eagle	W. K. Y. Yeung	·	2.2 km	MPC · JPL
163902	2003 SW_{222}	—	September 30, 2003	Socorro	LINEAR	AMO +1km	1.3 km	MPC · JPL
163903	2003 SK_{223}	—	September 29, 2003	Desert Eagle	W. K. Y. Yeung	·	2.4 km	MPC · JPL
163904	2003 SX_{224}	—	September 24, 2003	Palomar	NEAT	·	2.4 km	MPC · JPL
163905	2003 SW_{225}	—	September 26, 2003	Socorro	LINEAR	·	2.0 km	MPC · JPL
163906	2003 SA_{226}	—	September 26, 2003	Socorro	LINEAR	·	2.4 km	MPC · JPL
163907	2003 SD_{230}	—	September 24, 2003	Palomar	NEAT	(5)	1.7 km	MPC · JPL
163908	2003 SU_{234}	—	September 25, 2003	Haleakala	NEAT	·	4.1 km	MPC · JPL
163909	2003 SM_{237}	—	September 26, 2003	Socorro	LINEAR	·	2.6 km	MPC · JPL
163910	2003 SF_{238}	—	September 27, 2003	Desert Eagle	W. K. Y. Yeung	·	1.5 km	MPC · JPL
163911	2003 SA_{239}	—	September 27, 2003	Socorro	LINEAR	·	2.4 km	MPC · JPL
163912	2003 SN_{245}	—	September 26, 2003	Socorro	LINEAR	·	2.9 km	MPC · JPL
163913	2003 SP_{246}	—	September 26, 2003	Socorro	LINEAR	·	2.7 km	MPC · JPL
163914	2003 SU_{247}	—	September 26, 2003	Socorro	LINEAR	·	2.3 km	MPC · JPL
163915	2003 SO_{248}	—	September 26, 2003	Socorro	LINEAR	·	3.5 km	MPC · JPL
163916	2003 SE_{252}	—	September 26, 2003	Socorro	LINEAR	·	2.0 km	MPC · JPL
163917	2003 SH_{252}	—	September 26, 2003	Socorro	LINEAR	·	2.2 km	MPC · JPL
163918	2003 SQ_{252}	—	September 26, 2003	Socorro	LINEAR	·	2.5 km	MPC · JPL
163919	2003 SX_{259}	—	September 28, 2003	Kitt Peak	Spacewatch	·	3.4 km	MPC · JPL
163920	2003 SM_{272}	—	September 27, 2003	Socorro	LINEAR	·	2.9 km	MPC · JPL
163921	2003 SK_{278}	—	September 30, 2003	Socorro	LINEAR	·	2.3 km	MPC · JPL
163922	2003 SL_{282}	—	September 19, 2003	Anderson Mesa	LONEOS	·	2.2 km	MPC · JPL
163923	2003 SW_{292}	—	September 26, 2003	Črni Vrh	S. Matičič, J. Skvarč	·	4.2 km	MPC · JPL
163924	2003 SN_{293}	—	September 27, 2003	Socorro	LINEAR	·	1.7 km	MPC · JPL
163925	2003 SC_{296}	—	September 29, 2003	Anderson Mesa	LONEOS	·	2.3 km	MPC · JPL
163926	2003 SN_{299}	—	September 29, 2003	Socorro	LINEAR	MAR	2.5 km	MPC · JPL
163927	2003 SO_{304}	—	September 17, 2003	Palomar	NEAT	·	1.8 km	MPC · JPL
163928	2003 SY_{304}	—	September 17, 2003	Palomar	NEAT	·	2.5 km	MPC · JPL
163929	2003 SF_{306}	—	September 30, 2003	Socorro	LINEAR	·	4.5 km	MPC · JPL
163930	2003 SQ_{308}	—	September 29, 2003	Anderson Mesa	LONEOS	EUN	2.9 km	MPC · JPL
163931	2003 SQ_{309}	—	September 27, 2003	Socorro	LINEAR	·	2.4 km	MPC · JPL
163932	2003 SD_{310}	—	September 28, 2003	Socorro	LINEAR	·	2.2 km	MPC · JPL
163933	2003 SG_{310}	—	September 28, 2003	Socorro	LINEAR	PHO	4.0 km	MPC · JPL
163934	2003 SG_{311}	—	September 29, 2003	Socorro	LINEAR	·	3.5 km	MPC · JPL
163935	2003 SG_{321}	—	September 20, 2003	Campo Imperatore	CINEOS	·	2.5 km	MPC · JPL
163936	2003 TT_{11}	—	October 14, 2003	Anderson Mesa	LONEOS	·	1.8 km	MPC · JPL
163937	2003 TD_{12}	—	October 14, 2003	Anderson Mesa	LONEOS	·	3.5 km	MPC · JPL
163938	2003 TV_{17}	—	October 15, 2003	Palomar	NEAT	NEM	3.0 km	MPC · JPL
163939	2003 TA_{20}	—	October 5, 2003	Socorro	LINEAR	EUN	2.4 km	MPC · JPL
163940	2003 TK_{20}	—	October 14, 2003	Palomar	NEAT	·	2.3 km	MPC · JPL
163941	2003 TU_{58}	—	October 5, 2003	Socorro	LINEAR	·	3.1 km	MPC · JPL
163942	2003 UN	—	October 16, 2003	Palomar	NEAT	·	4.3 km	MPC · JPL
163943	2003 UF_{9}	—	October 18, 2003	Socorro	LINEAR	·	2.6 km	MPC · JPL
163944	2003 UE_{12}	—	October 20, 2003	Nashville	Clingan, R.	·	2.6 km	MPC · JPL
163945	2003 UJ_{12}	—	October 21, 2003	Nashville	Clingan, R.	·	4.4 km	MPC · JPL
163946	2003 UC_{14}	—	October 16, 2003	Anderson Mesa	LONEOS	·	4.0 km	MPC · JPL
163947	2003 UW_{15}	—	October 16, 2003	Anderson Mesa	LONEOS	·	2.1 km	MPC · JPL
163948	2003 UH_{19}	—	October 20, 2003	Kitt Peak	Spacewatch	·	2.7 km	MPC · JPL
163949	2003 UN_{21}	—	October 17, 2003	Anderson Mesa	LONEOS	·	3.6 km	MPC · JPL
163950	2003 UN_{22}	—	October 23, 2003	Wrightwood	J. W. Young	fast	2.3 km	MPC · JPL
163951	2003 UP_{22}	—	October 23, 2003	Kitt Peak	Spacewatch	·	3.0 km	MPC · JPL
163952	2003 UN_{28}	—	October 19, 2003	Kitt Peak	Spacewatch	HOF	4.8 km	MPC · JPL
163953	2003 UC_{36}	—	October 16, 2003	Palomar	NEAT	·	3.3 km	MPC · JPL
163954	2003 UA_{37}	—	October 16, 2003	Palomar	NEAT	·	2.5 km	MPC · JPL
163955	2003 US_{40}	—	October 16, 2003	Anderson Mesa	LONEOS	·	3.7 km	MPC · JPL
163956	2003 UV_{45}	—	October 18, 2003	Kitt Peak	Spacewatch	AGN	2.1 km	MPC · JPL
163957	2003 UY_{48}	—	October 16, 2003	Anderson Mesa	LONEOS	(5)	2.4 km	MPC · JPL
163958	2003 UY_{55}	—	October 24, 2003	Kingsnake	J. V. McClusky	·	3.2 km	MPC · JPL
163959	2003 UF_{63}	—	October 16, 2003	Palomar	NEAT	NEM	3.4 km	MPC · JPL
163960	2003 UX_{63}	—	October 16, 2003	Anderson Mesa	LONEOS	·	3.3 km	MPC · JPL
163961	2003 UD_{68}	—	October 16, 2003	Kitt Peak	Spacewatch	·	2.3 km	MPC · JPL
163962	2003 US_{77}	—	October 17, 2003	Kitt Peak	Spacewatch	·	3.0 km	MPC · JPL
163963	2003 UO_{80}	—	October 16, 2003	Kitt Peak	Spacewatch	·	2.6 km	MPC · JPL
163964	2003 UR_{81}	—	October 16, 2003	Haleakala	NEAT	·	2.0 km	MPC · JPL
163965	2003 UT_{82}	—	October 19, 2003	Palomar	NEAT	·	2.5 km	MPC · JPL
163966	2003 UJ_{86}	—	October 18, 2003	Palomar	NEAT	·	2.4 km	MPC · JPL
163967	2003 UV_{88}	—	October 19, 2003	Anderson Mesa	LONEOS	·	3.0 km	MPC · JPL
163968	2003 UV_{99}	—	October 19, 2003	Palomar	NEAT	·	3.4 km	MPC · JPL
163969	2003 UA_{100}	—	October 19, 2003	Palomar	NEAT	·	2.1 km	MPC · JPL
163970	2003 UW_{101}	—	October 20, 2003	Socorro	LINEAR	·	1.8 km	MPC · JPL
163971	2003 UQ_{102}	—	October 20, 2003	Kitt Peak	Spacewatch	·	2.1 km	MPC · JPL
163972	2003 UF_{106}	—	October 18, 2003	Kitt Peak	Spacewatch	·	2.5 km	MPC · JPL
163973	2003 UL_{107}	—	October 19, 2003	Kitt Peak	Spacewatch	·	1.9 km	MPC · JPL
163974	2003 UC_{109}	—	October 19, 2003	Palomar	NEAT	·	2.6 km	MPC · JPL
163975	2003 UB_{110}	—	October 19, 2003	Kitt Peak	Spacewatch	·	2.3 km	MPC · JPL
163976	2003 UN_{111}	—	October 20, 2003	Palomar	NEAT	·	2.2 km	MPC · JPL
163977	2003 UY_{111}	—	October 20, 2003	Socorro	LINEAR	·	2.2 km	MPC · JPL
163978	2003 UU_{115}	—	October 20, 2003	Palomar	NEAT	AGN	2.1 km	MPC · JPL
163979	2003 UF_{116}	—	October 21, 2003	Socorro	LINEAR	·	2.5 km	MPC · JPL
163980	2003 UC_{118}	—	October 17, 2003	Anderson Mesa	LONEOS	·	3.6 km	MPC · JPL
163981	2003 UY_{120}	—	October 18, 2003	Kitt Peak	Spacewatch	·	4.2 km	MPC · JPL
163982	2003 UK_{127}	—	October 21, 2003	Kitt Peak	Spacewatch	·	2.9 km	MPC · JPL
163983	2003 UK_{129}	—	October 18, 2003	Palomar	NEAT	·	3.9 km	MPC · JPL
163984	2003 UC_{132}	—	October 19, 2003	Anderson Mesa	LONEOS	EUN	3.3 km	MPC · JPL
163985	2003 UM_{134}	—	October 20, 2003	Palomar	NEAT	WIT	2.1 km	MPC · JPL
163986	2003 UV_{134}	—	October 20, 2003	Palomar	NEAT	(5)	2.1 km	MPC · JPL
163987	2003 UK_{138}	—	October 21, 2003	Socorro	LINEAR	·	2.8 km	MPC · JPL
163988	2003 UQ_{142}	—	October 18, 2003	Anderson Mesa	LONEOS	·	3.8 km	MPC · JPL
163989	2003 UD_{147}	—	October 18, 2003	Anderson Mesa	LONEOS	·	2.9 km	MPC · JPL
163990	2003 UN_{147}	—	October 18, 2003	Anderson Mesa	LONEOS	·	4.5 km	MPC · JPL
163991	2003 UR_{147}	—	October 18, 2003	Kitt Peak	Spacewatch	·	2.0 km	MPC · JPL
163992	2003 UZ_{147}	—	October 18, 2003	Palomar	NEAT	·	2.9 km	MPC · JPL
163993	2003 UR_{148}	—	October 19, 2003	Kitt Peak	Spacewatch	·	3.2 km	MPC · JPL
163994	2003 UT_{149}	—	October 20, 2003	Socorro	LINEAR	(5)	1.8 km	MPC · JPL
163995	2003 UO_{150}	—	October 20, 2003	Kitt Peak	Spacewatch	·	2.8 km	MPC · JPL
163996	2003 UT_{150}	—	October 21, 2003	Kitt Peak	Spacewatch	·	2.8 km	MPC · JPL
163997	2003 UK_{163}	—	October 21, 2003	Socorro	LINEAR	·	3.3 km	MPC · JPL
163998	2003 UL_{164}	—	October 21, 2003	Socorro	LINEAR	·	3.2 km	MPC · JPL
163999	2003 UR_{165}	—	October 21, 2003	Kitt Peak	Spacewatch	KOR	1.7 km	MPC · JPL
164000	2003 UH_{167}	—	October 22, 2003	Socorro	LINEAR	·	2.4 km	MPC · JPL

back to top

== See also ==
- Meanings of minor-planet names: 163001–164000
