= List of minor planets: 803001–804000 =

The following is a partial list of minor planets, running from minor-planet number 803001 through 804000, inclusive. The primary data for this and other partial lists is based on JPL's "Small-Body Orbital Elements" and data available from the Minor Planet Center. Critical list information is also provided by the MPC, unless otherwise specified from Lowell Observatory. A detailed description of the table's columns and additional sources are given on the main page including a complete list of every page in this series, and a statistical break-up on the dynamical classification of minor planets.

Also see the summary list of all named bodies in numerical and alphabetical order, and the corresponding naming citations for the number range of this particular list. New namings may only be added to this list after official publication, as the preannouncement of names is condemned by the Working Group for Small Bodies Nomenclature of the International Astronomical Union.

| Near-Earth obj. | MBA (inner) | MBA (outer) | Centaur |
| Mars-crosser | MBA (middle) | Jupiter trojan | Trans-Neptunian obj. |
| Unclassified |

== 803001–803100 ==
| Designation | | | Discovery | | | Properties | | Ref |
| Permanent | Provisional | Named after | Date | Site | Discoverer(s) | Category | Diam. | Ref |
|---|---|---|---|---|---|---|---|---|
| 803001 | 2015 HA_{313} | — | February 12, 2008 | Kitt Peak | Spacewatch | · | 2.6 km | MPC · JPL |
| 803002 | 2015 HZ_{314} | — | April 18, 2015 | Cerro Tololo | DECam | EOS | 1.4 km | MPC · JPL |
| 803003 | 2015 HH_{340} | — | April 20, 2015 | Kitt Peak | Spacewatch | EOS | 1.2 km | MPC · JPL |
| 803004 | 2015 HH_{341} | — | April 18, 2015 | Cerro Tololo | DECam | TIR | 1.4 km | MPC · JPL |
| 803005 | 2015 HL_{347} | — | April 18, 2015 | Cerro Tololo | DECam | VER | 1.8 km | MPC · JPL |
| 803006 | 2015 HL_{348} | — | April 18, 2015 | Cerro Tololo | DECam | · | 1.9 km | MPC · JPL |
| 803007 | 2015 HK_{351} | — | April 18, 2015 | Cerro Tololo | DECam | · | 1.4 km | MPC · JPL |
| 803008 | 2015 HN_{351} | — | April 18, 2015 | Cerro Tololo | DECam | · | 1.3 km | MPC · JPL |
| 803009 | 2015 HZ_{352} | — | April 18, 2015 | Cerro Tololo | DECam | · | 950 m | MPC · JPL |
| 803010 | 2015 HC_{356} | — | April 16, 2015 | Mount Lemmon | Mount Lemmon Survey | · | 1.9 km | MPC · JPL |
| 803011 | 2015 HF_{358} | — | April 18, 2015 | Cerro Tololo | DECam | L4 | 5.0 km | MPC · JPL |
| 803012 | 2015 HC_{380} | — | April 23, 2015 | Haleakala | Pan-STARRS 1 | · | 1.1 km | MPC · JPL |
| 803013 | 2015 HZ_{394} | — | April 18, 2015 | Cerro Tololo | DECam | · | 1.8 km | MPC · JPL |
| 803014 | 2015 HE_{416} | — | April 19, 2015 | Cerro Tololo | DECam | L4 | 5.6 km | MPC · JPL |
| 803015 | 2015 HX_{467} | — | April 19, 2015 | Cerro Tololo | DECam | · | 1.3 km | MPC · JPL |
| 803016 | 2015 HD_{468} | — | April 20, 2015 | Haleakala | Pan-STARRS 1 | · | 1.8 km | MPC · JPL |
| 803017 | 2015 HJ_{468} | — | April 18, 2015 | Cerro Tololo | DECam | L4 | 5.6 km | MPC · JPL |
| 803018 | 2015 JY | — | May 11, 2015 | Haleakala | Pan-STARRS 1 | H | 450 m | MPC · JPL |
| 803019 | 2015 JB_{3} | — | May 14, 2015 | Haleakala | Pan-STARRS 1 | H | 360 m | MPC · JPL |
| 803020 | 2015 JU_{7} | — | February 24, 2009 | Mount Lemmon | Mount Lemmon Survey | · | 2.1 km | MPC · JPL |
| 803021 | 2015 JA_{11} | — | March 22, 2015 | Haleakala | Pan-STARRS 1 | L4 | 5.9 km | MPC · JPL |
| 803022 | 2015 JJ_{11} | — | March 28, 2015 | Haleakala | Pan-STARRS 1 | H | 320 m | MPC · JPL |
| 803023 | 2015 JL_{11} | — | May 11, 2015 | Haleakala | Pan-STARRS 1 | H | 400 m | MPC · JPL |
| 803024 | 2015 JF_{12} | — | May 1, 2015 | Mount Lemmon | Mount Lemmon Survey | · | 2.0 km | MPC · JPL |
| 803025 | 2015 JW_{14} | — | May 12, 2015 | Mount Lemmon | Mount Lemmon Survey | · | 2.2 km | MPC · JPL |
| 803026 | 2015 JK_{16} | — | May 13, 2015 | Mount Lemmon | Mount Lemmon Survey | · | 1.9 km | MPC · JPL |
| 803027 | 2015 JO_{16} | — | May 15, 2015 | Haleakala | Pan-STARRS 1 | · | 3.1 km | MPC · JPL |
| 803028 | 2015 JP_{16} | — | May 15, 2015 | Haleakala | Pan-STARRS 1 | · | 1.2 km | MPC · JPL |
| 803029 | 2015 JM_{17} | — | October 7, 2016 | Haleakala | Pan-STARRS 1 | · | 780 m | MPC · JPL |
| 803030 | 2015 JR_{17} | — | December 11, 2017 | Haleakala | Pan-STARRS 1 | MAR | 800 m | MPC · JPL |
| 803031 | 2015 JW_{17} | — | May 15, 2015 | Haleakala | Pan-STARRS 1 | EUN | 860 m | MPC · JPL |
| 803032 | 2015 JZ_{19} | — | May 14, 2015 | Haleakala | Pan-STARRS 1 | · | 2.7 km | MPC · JPL |
| 803033 | 2015 JD_{20} | — | May 11, 2015 | Mount Lemmon | Mount Lemmon Survey | · | 1.3 km | MPC · JPL |
| 803034 | 2015 JU_{20} | — | May 15, 2015 | Haleakala | Pan-STARRS 1 | · | 1.3 km | MPC · JPL |
| 803035 | 2015 JC_{22} | — | May 11, 2015 | Mount Lemmon | Mount Lemmon Survey | · | 1.5 km | MPC · JPL |
| 803036 | 2015 JJ_{22} | — | May 14, 2015 | Haleakala | Pan-STARRS 1 | · | 1.2 km | MPC · JPL |
| 803037 | 2015 JP_{22} | — | June 20, 1993 | Kitt Peak | Spacewatch | · | 1.2 km | MPC · JPL |
| 803038 | 2015 JH_{23} | — | May 10, 2015 | Mount Lemmon | Mount Lemmon Survey | · | 1.4 km | MPC · JPL |
| 803039 | 2015 JU_{24} | — | May 15, 2015 | Haleakala | Pan-STARRS 1 | · | 1.8 km | MPC · JPL |
| 803040 | 2015 JV_{25} | — | May 10, 2015 | Mount Lemmon | Mount Lemmon Survey | · | 1.3 km | MPC · JPL |
| 803041 | 2015 JV_{26} | — | May 14, 2015 | Haleakala | Pan-STARRS 1 | · | 1.8 km | MPC · JPL |
| 803042 | 2015 JR_{27} | — | May 11, 2015 | Mount Lemmon | Mount Lemmon Survey | · | 1.5 km | MPC · JPL |
| 803043 | 2015 JX_{27} | — | May 11, 2015 | Mount Lemmon | Mount Lemmon Survey | · | 1.7 km | MPC · JPL |
| 803044 | 2015 JJ_{28} | — | May 11, 2015 | Mount Lemmon | Mount Lemmon Survey | · | 2.0 km | MPC · JPL |
| 803045 | 2015 JY_{28} | — | May 10, 2015 | Mount Lemmon | Mount Lemmon Survey | AEO | 730 m | MPC · JPL |
| 803046 | 2015 JG_{29} | — | May 9, 2015 | Cerro Paranal | Altmann, M., Prusti, T. | · | 2.7 km | MPC · JPL |
| 803047 | 2015 JG_{33} | — | May 11, 2015 | Mount Lemmon | Mount Lemmon Survey | · | 1.7 km | MPC · JPL |
| 803048 | 2015 JS_{34} | — | May 11, 2015 | Mount Lemmon | Mount Lemmon Survey | L4 | 5.7 km | MPC · JPL |
| 803049 | 2015 JY_{35} | — | May 11, 2015 | Mount Lemmon | Mount Lemmon Survey | L4 | 5.6 km | MPC · JPL |
| 803050 | 2015 KE_{9} | — | May 18, 2015 | Mount Lemmon | Mount Lemmon Survey | · | 2.4 km | MPC · JPL |
| 803051 | 2015 KK_{11} | — | March 28, 2015 | Haleakala | Pan-STARRS 1 | · | 1.9 km | MPC · JPL |
| 803052 | 2015 KK_{14} | — | May 18, 2015 | Haleakala | Pan-STARRS 1 | EOS | 1.1 km | MPC · JPL |
| 803053 | 2015 KQ_{14} | — | May 18, 2015 | Haleakala | Pan-STARRS 1 | EOS | 1.4 km | MPC · JPL |
| 803054 | 2015 KQ_{15} | — | May 18, 2015 | Haleakala | Pan-STARRS 1 | EOS | 1.3 km | MPC · JPL |
| 803055 | 2015 KX_{18} | — | February 18, 2015 | Haleakala | Pan-STARRS 1 | H | 500 m | MPC · JPL |
| 803056 | 2015 KJ_{31} | — | April 28, 2015 | Cerro Paranal | Gaia Ground Based Optical Tracking | · | 1.3 km | MPC · JPL |
| 803057 | 2015 KA_{32} | — | March 10, 2011 | Kitt Peak | Spacewatch | NYS | 920 m | MPC · JPL |
| 803058 | 2015 KS_{34} | — | May 19, 2015 | Haleakala | Pan-STARRS 1 | · | 2.4 km | MPC · JPL |
| 803059 | 2015 KN_{39} | — | May 13, 2015 | Cerro Paranal | Gaia Ground Based Optical Tracking | · | 1.2 km | MPC · JPL |
| 803060 | 2015 KK_{40} | — | November 24, 2009 | Kitt Peak | Spacewatch | · | 570 m | MPC · JPL |
| 803061 | 2015 KU_{42} | — | May 20, 2015 | Haleakala | Pan-STARRS 1 | VER | 2.2 km | MPC · JPL |
| 803062 | 2015 KU_{46} | — | May 20, 2015 | Haleakala | Pan-STARRS 1 | · | 1.1 km | MPC · JPL |
| 803063 | 2015 KL_{50} | — | May 20, 2015 | Haleakala | Pan-STARRS 1 | · | 1.7 km | MPC · JPL |
| 803064 | 2015 KK_{53} | — | March 21, 2015 | Haleakala | Pan-STARRS 1 | · | 1.1 km | MPC · JPL |
| 803065 | 2015 KR_{53} | — | May 20, 2015 | Haleakala | Pan-STARRS 1 | · | 2.2 km | MPC · JPL |
| 803066 | 2015 KS_{54} | — | May 20, 2015 | Haleakala | Pan-STARRS 1 | · | 1.2 km | MPC · JPL |
| 803067 | 2015 KS_{56} | — | May 21, 2015 | Haleakala | Pan-STARRS 1 | H | 380 m | MPC · JPL |
| 803068 | 2015 KW_{57} | — | May 16, 2015 | Calar Alto | S. Mottola, S. Hellmich | · | 1.9 km | MPC · JPL |
| 803069 | 2015 KA_{63} | — | May 21, 2015 | Haleakala | Pan-STARRS 1 | EOS | 1.3 km | MPC · JPL |
| 803070 | 2015 KG_{64} | — | May 21, 2015 | Haleakala | Pan-STARRS 1 | VER | 1.9 km | MPC · JPL |
| 803071 | 2015 KM_{65} | — | May 21, 2015 | Haleakala | Pan-STARRS 1 | · | 2.2 km | MPC · JPL |
| 803072 | 2015 KO_{67} | — | May 11, 2015 | Mount Lemmon | Mount Lemmon Survey | · | 2.1 km | MPC · JPL |
| 803073 | 2015 KA_{69} | — | May 21, 2015 | Haleakala | Pan-STARRS 1 | · | 2.1 km | MPC · JPL |
| 803074 | 2015 KT_{69} | — | May 21, 2015 | Haleakala | Pan-STARRS 1 | VER | 2.1 km | MPC · JPL |
| 803075 | 2015 KW_{69} | — | May 21, 2015 | Haleakala | Pan-STARRS 1 | EOS | 1.3 km | MPC · JPL |
| 803076 | 2015 KF_{71} | — | May 21, 2015 | Haleakala | Pan-STARRS 1 | · | 2.3 km | MPC · JPL |
| 803077 | 2015 KS_{72} | — | May 21, 2015 | Haleakala | Pan-STARRS 1 | · | 1.2 km | MPC · JPL |
| 803078 | 2015 KX_{73} | — | May 21, 2015 | Haleakala | Pan-STARRS 1 | · | 1.6 km | MPC · JPL |
| 803079 | 2015 KO_{74} | — | May 21, 2015 | Haleakala | Pan-STARRS 1 | · | 1.8 km | MPC · JPL |
| 803080 | 2015 KN_{76} | — | March 31, 2015 | Haleakala | Pan-STARRS 1 | · | 1.7 km | MPC · JPL |
| 803081 | 2015 KC_{78} | — | May 21, 2015 | Haleakala | Pan-STARRS 1 | · | 1.8 km | MPC · JPL |
| 803082 | 2015 KP_{78} | — | April 23, 2015 | Haleakala | Pan-STARRS 1 | · | 1.6 km | MPC · JPL |
| 803083 | 2015 KD_{82} | — | March 28, 2015 | Haleakala | Pan-STARRS 1 | · | 2.1 km | MPC · JPL |
| 803084 | 2015 KT_{83} | — | May 21, 2015 | Haleakala | Pan-STARRS 1 | · | 1.2 km | MPC · JPL |
| 803085 | 2015 KO_{84} | — | March 28, 2015 | Haleakala | Pan-STARRS 1 | · | 1.5 km | MPC · JPL |
| 803086 | 2015 KV_{84} | — | May 21, 2015 | Haleakala | Pan-STARRS 1 | · | 2.0 km | MPC · JPL |
| 803087 | 2015 KW_{84} | — | March 28, 2015 | Haleakala | Pan-STARRS 1 | · | 1.9 km | MPC · JPL |
| 803088 | 2015 KB_{85} | — | May 21, 2015 | Haleakala | Pan-STARRS 1 | · | 1.4 km | MPC · JPL |
| 803089 | 2015 KU_{85} | — | May 11, 2015 | Mount Lemmon | Mount Lemmon Survey | · | 1.9 km | MPC · JPL |
| 803090 | 2015 KE_{86} | — | May 21, 2015 | Haleakala | Pan-STARRS 1 | VER | 1.9 km | MPC · JPL |
| 803091 | 2015 KM_{86} | — | May 21, 2015 | Haleakala | Pan-STARRS 1 | · | 970 m | MPC · JPL |
| 803092 | 2015 KS_{87} | — | April 18, 2015 | Kitt Peak | Spacewatch | · | 1.3 km | MPC · JPL |
| 803093 | 2015 KH_{88} | — | May 21, 2015 | Haleakala | Pan-STARRS 1 | · | 1.5 km | MPC · JPL |
| 803094 | 2015 KW_{88} | — | December 12, 2012 | Mount Lemmon | Mount Lemmon Survey | · | 1.9 km | MPC · JPL |
| 803095 | 2015 KV_{90} | — | May 21, 2015 | Haleakala | Pan-STARRS 1 | · | 1.5 km | MPC · JPL |
| 803096 | 2015 KX_{92} | — | October 23, 2011 | Haleakala | Pan-STARRS 1 | · | 2.1 km | MPC · JPL |
| 803097 | 2015 KK_{98} | — | May 21, 2015 | Haleakala | Pan-STARRS 1 | · | 1.9 km | MPC · JPL |
| 803098 | 2015 KU_{98} | — | May 21, 2015 | Haleakala | Pan-STARRS 1 | VER | 1.9 km | MPC · JPL |
| 803099 | 2015 KL_{99} | — | August 14, 2012 | Haleakala | Pan-STARRS 1 | · | 530 m | MPC · JPL |
| 803100 | 2015 KQ_{110} | — | May 21, 2015 | Haleakala | Pan-STARRS 1 | EOS | 1.2 km | MPC · JPL |

== 803101–803200 ==
back to top

| Designation | | | Discovery | | | Properties | | Ref |
| Permanent | Provisional | Named after | Date | Site | Discoverer(s) | Category | Diam. | Ref |
|---|---|---|---|---|---|---|---|---|
| 803101 | 2015 KV_{111} | — | May 18, 2015 | Haleakala | Pan-STARRS 1 | · | 1.8 km | MPC · JPL |
| 803102 | 2015 KK_{112} | — | May 21, 2015 | Haleakala | Pan-STARRS 1 | · | 2.2 km | MPC · JPL |
| 803103 | 2015 KP_{113} | — | September 16, 2012 | Kitt Peak | Spacewatch | · | 750 m | MPC · JPL |
| 803104 | 2015 KY_{113} | — | May 21, 2015 | Haleakala | Pan-STARRS 1 | EOS | 1.1 km | MPC · JPL |
| 803105 | 2015 KS_{114} | — | May 21, 2015 | Haleakala | Pan-STARRS 1 | · | 540 m | MPC · JPL |
| 803106 | 2015 KX_{114} | — | May 13, 2015 | Mount Lemmon | Mount Lemmon Survey | · | 1.6 km | MPC · JPL |
| 803107 | 2015 KS_{116} | — | May 21, 2015 | Haleakala | Pan-STARRS 1 | · | 860 m | MPC · JPL |
| 803108 | 2015 KP_{119} | — | April 18, 2015 | Haleakala | Pan-STARRS 1 | MAR | 1.0 km | MPC · JPL |
| 803109 | 2015 KD_{121} | — | May 22, 2015 | Haleakala | Pan-STARRS 1 | H | 390 m | MPC · JPL |
| 803110 | 2015 KR_{125} | — | March 28, 2015 | Haleakala | Pan-STARRS 1 | H | 420 m | MPC · JPL |
| 803111 | 2015 KG_{138} | — | March 22, 2015 | Haleakala | Pan-STARRS 1 | · | 780 m | MPC · JPL |
| 803112 | 2015 KR_{138} | — | March 31, 2015 | Haleakala | Pan-STARRS 1 | · | 1.6 km | MPC · JPL |
| 803113 | 2015 KH_{139} | — | May 18, 2015 | Haleakala | Pan-STARRS 2 | EUN | 930 m | MPC · JPL |
| 803114 | 2015 KB_{140} | — | May 24, 2015 | Haleakala | Pan-STARRS 1 | · | 1 km | MPC · JPL |
| 803115 | 2015 KW_{146} | — | April 25, 2015 | Haleakala | Pan-STARRS 1 | · | 2.0 km | MPC · JPL |
| 803116 | 2015 KZ_{146} | — | April 18, 2015 | Haleakala | Pan-STARRS 1 | · | 1.6 km | MPC · JPL |
| 803117 | 2015 KZ_{150} | — | April 25, 2015 | Haleakala | Pan-STARRS 1 | · | 2.6 km | MPC · JPL |
| 803118 | 2015 KR_{151} | — | April 20, 2015 | Haleakala | Pan-STARRS 1 | · | 730 m | MPC · JPL |
| 803119 | 2015 KV_{163} | — | May 26, 2015 | Haleakala | Pan-STARRS 1 | H | 360 m | MPC · JPL |
| 803120 | 2015 KA_{164} | — | May 21, 2015 | Haleakala | Pan-STARRS 1 | H | 410 m | MPC · JPL |
| 803121 | 2015 KD_{165} | — | September 19, 2003 | Palomar Mountain | NEAT | MAR | 940 m | MPC · JPL |
| 803122 | 2015 KZ_{165} | — | April 18, 2009 | Kitt Peak | Spacewatch | THM | 1.7 km | MPC · JPL |
| 803123 | 2015 KC_{179} | — | May 21, 2015 | Haleakala | Pan-STARRS 1 | · | 990 m | MPC · JPL |
| 803124 | 2015 KS_{179} | — | May 22, 2015 | Haleakala | Pan-STARRS 1 | · | 1.5 km | MPC · JPL |
| 803125 | 2015 KH_{180} | — | May 18, 2015 | Haleakala | Pan-STARRS 1 | H | 430 m | MPC · JPL |
| 803126 | 2015 KM_{180} | — | May 22, 2015 | Haleakala | Pan-STARRS 1 | · | 1.4 km | MPC · JPL |
| 803127 | 2015 KW_{181} | — | May 30, 2015 | Mount Lemmon | Mount Lemmon Survey | H | 550 m | MPC · JPL |
| 803128 | 2015 KX_{181} | — | June 2, 2016 | Haleakala | Pan-STARRS 1 | · | 2.7 km | MPC · JPL |
| 803129 | 2015 KP_{184} | — | May 24, 2015 | Haleakala | Pan-STARRS 1 | EUN | 900 m | MPC · JPL |
| 803130 | 2015 KY_{185} | — | May 21, 2015 | Haleakala | Pan-STARRS 1 | · | 2.0 km | MPC · JPL |
| 803131 | 2015 KQ_{186} | — | May 22, 2015 | Haleakala | Pan-STARRS 1 | · | 2.1 km | MPC · JPL |
| 803132 | 2015 KD_{187} | — | May 21, 2015 | Haleakala | Pan-STARRS 1 | EOS | 1.4 km | MPC · JPL |
| 803133 | 2015 KW_{187} | — | May 20, 2015 | Haleakala | Pan-STARRS 1 | · | 2.2 km | MPC · JPL |
| 803134 | 2015 KA_{188} | — | May 18, 2015 | Mount Lemmon | Mount Lemmon Survey | · | 1.4 km | MPC · JPL |
| 803135 | 2015 KM_{188} | — | May 22, 2015 | Haleakala | Pan-STARRS 1 | · | 1.2 km | MPC · JPL |
| 803136 | 2015 KP_{188} | — | May 21, 2015 | Haleakala | Pan-STARRS 1 | · | 1.3 km | MPC · JPL |
| 803137 | 2015 KV_{188} | — | May 25, 2015 | Haleakala | Pan-STARRS 1 | · | 1.2 km | MPC · JPL |
| 803138 | 2015 KR_{189} | — | May 22, 2015 | Haleakala | Pan-STARRS 1 | · | 1.9 km | MPC · JPL |
| 803139 | 2015 KT_{189} | — | May 26, 2015 | Haleakala | Pan-STARRS 1 | · | 1.7 km | MPC · JPL |
| 803140 | 2015 KZ_{189} | — | May 22, 2015 | Haleakala | Pan-STARRS 1 | · | 570 m | MPC · JPL |
| 803141 | 2015 KH_{190} | — | May 18, 2015 | Haleakala | Pan-STARRS 1 | · | 1.1 km | MPC · JPL |
| 803142 | 2015 KQ_{190} | — | May 26, 2015 | Mount Lemmon | Mount Lemmon Survey | · | 1.4 km | MPC · JPL |
| 803143 | 2015 KU_{190} | — | May 21, 2015 | Haleakala | Pan-STARRS 1 | · | 1.4 km | MPC · JPL |
| 803144 | 2015 KC_{191} | — | May 21, 2015 | Haleakala | Pan-STARRS 1 | EOS | 1.1 km | MPC · JPL |
| 803145 | 2015 KG_{191} | — | May 21, 2015 | Haleakala | Pan-STARRS 1 | critical | 1.5 km | MPC · JPL |
| 803146 | 2015 KC_{192} | — | February 24, 2014 | Haleakala | Pan-STARRS 1 | · | 1.2 km | MPC · JPL |
| 803147 | 2015 KK_{192} | — | May 25, 2015 | Haleakala | Pan-STARRS 1 | EOS | 1.4 km | MPC · JPL |
| 803148 | 2015 KU_{192} | — | May 18, 2015 | Haleakala | Pan-STARRS 1 | · | 2.1 km | MPC · JPL |
| 803149 | 2015 KA_{193} | — | May 21, 2015 | Haleakala | Pan-STARRS 1 | EOS | 1.2 km | MPC · JPL |
| 803150 | 2015 KB_{194} | — | May 25, 2015 | Haleakala | Pan-STARRS 1 | · | 1.3 km | MPC · JPL |
| 803151 | 2015 KD_{195} | — | May 21, 2015 | Haleakala | Pan-STARRS 1 | · | 1.5 km | MPC · JPL |
| 803152 | 2015 KM_{196} | — | May 21, 2015 | Haleakala | Pan-STARRS 1 | EOS | 1.1 km | MPC · JPL |
| 803153 | 2015 KN_{196} | — | May 21, 2015 | Haleakala | Pan-STARRS 1 | EMA | 2.0 km | MPC · JPL |
| 803154 | 2015 KU_{197} | — | May 21, 2015 | Haleakala | Pan-STARRS 1 | · | 1.3 km | MPC · JPL |
| 803155 | 2015 KX_{197} | — | May 25, 2015 | Haleakala | Pan-STARRS 1 | · | 1.4 km | MPC · JPL |
| 803156 | 2015 KA_{198} | — | May 25, 2015 | Mount Lemmon | Mount Lemmon Survey | · | 1.6 km | MPC · JPL |
| 803157 | 2015 KG_{198} | — | May 22, 2015 | Haleakala | Pan-STARRS 1 | · | 1.1 km | MPC · JPL |
| 803158 | 2015 KU_{198} | — | May 22, 2015 | Haleakala | Pan-STARRS 1 | · | 1.9 km | MPC · JPL |
| 803159 | 2015 KB_{199} | — | May 25, 2015 | Haleakala | Pan-STARRS 1 | H | 310 m | MPC · JPL |
| 803160 | 2015 KS_{199} | — | January 29, 2014 | Kitt Peak | Spacewatch | EOS | 1.4 km | MPC · JPL |
| 803161 | 2015 KR_{200} | — | May 21, 2015 | Haleakala | Pan-STARRS 1 | URS | 2.4 km | MPC · JPL |
| 803162 | 2015 KA_{201} | — | May 21, 2015 | Haleakala | Pan-STARRS 1 | URS | 2.2 km | MPC · JPL |
| 803163 | 2015 KB_{201} | — | May 21, 2015 | Haleakala | Pan-STARRS 1 | · | 2.3 km | MPC · JPL |
| 803164 | 2015 KE_{203} | — | May 21, 2015 | Haleakala | Pan-STARRS 1 | · | 1.8 km | MPC · JPL |
| 803165 | 2015 KR_{205} | — | May 21, 2015 | Haleakala | Pan-STARRS 1 | · | 1.5 km | MPC · JPL |
| 803166 | 2015 KQ_{207} | — | May 18, 2015 | Haleakala | Pan-STARRS 1 | EOS | 1.3 km | MPC · JPL |
| 803167 | 2015 KC_{208} | — | January 11, 2014 | Mount Lemmon | Mount Lemmon Survey | EUP | 2.4 km | MPC · JPL |
| 803168 | 2015 KQ_{208} | — | May 22, 2015 | Haleakala | Pan-STARRS 1 | · | 1.3 km | MPC · JPL |
| 803169 | 2015 KG_{209} | — | May 30, 2015 | Haleakala | Pan-STARRS 1 | · | 2.1 km | MPC · JPL |
| 803170 | 2015 KU_{209} | — | April 18, 2015 | Mount Lemmon | Mount Lemmon Survey | · | 1.3 km | MPC · JPL |
| 803171 | 2015 KV_{214} | — | June 19, 2015 | Haleakala | Pan-STARRS 1 | · | 1.7 km | MPC · JPL |
| 803172 | 2015 KM_{215} | — | May 21, 2015 | Haleakala | Pan-STARRS 1 | · | 1.1 km | MPC · JPL |
| 803173 | 2015 KS_{216} | — | May 24, 2015 | Haleakala | Pan-STARRS 1 | · | 1.6 km | MPC · JPL |
| 803174 | 2015 KC_{217} | — | August 29, 2016 | Mount Lemmon | Mount Lemmon Survey | · | 820 m | MPC · JPL |
| 803175 | 2015 KT_{217} | — | May 20, 2015 | Cerro Tololo | DECam | · | 1.8 km | MPC · JPL |
| 803176 | 2015 KK_{218} | — | May 21, 2015 | Haleakala | Pan-STARRS 1 | · | 1.4 km | MPC · JPL |
| 803177 | 2015 KQ_{220} | — | May 21, 2015 | Cerro Tololo | DECam | · | 1.8 km | MPC · JPL |
| 803178 | 2015 KA_{221} | — | May 20, 2015 | Cerro Tololo | DECam | · | 1.3 km | MPC · JPL |
| 803179 | 2015 KB_{221} | — | August 7, 2016 | Haleakala | Pan-STARRS 1 | VER | 1.6 km | MPC · JPL |
| 803180 | 2015 KH_{222} | — | May 20, 2015 | Cerro Tololo | DECam | EOS | 1.1 km | MPC · JPL |
| 803181 | 2015 KE_{232} | — | May 20, 2015 | Cerro Tololo | DECam | · | 1.9 km | MPC · JPL |
| 803182 | 2015 KF_{237} | — | May 20, 2015 | Cerro Tololo | DECam | · | 960 m | MPC · JPL |
| 803183 | 2015 KK_{237} | — | May 20, 2015 | Cerro Tololo | DECam | EOS | 1.4 km | MPC · JPL |
| 803184 | 2015 KN_{239} | — | May 22, 2015 | Cerro Tololo | DECam | · | 1.8 km | MPC · JPL |
| 803185 | 2015 KQ_{239} | — | May 20, 2015 | Cerro Tololo | DECam | · | 560 m | MPC · JPL |
| 803186 | 2015 KU_{239} | — | May 20, 2015 | Cerro Tololo | DECam | · | 2.5 km | MPC · JPL |
| 803187 | 2015 KQ_{240} | — | May 23, 2015 | Mount Lemmon | Mount Lemmon Survey | · | 2.0 km | MPC · JPL |
| 803188 | 2015 KY_{242} | — | May 26, 2015 | Haleakala | Pan-STARRS 1 | · | 1.9 km | MPC · JPL |
| 803189 | 2015 KS_{248} | — | July 11, 2016 | Haleakala | Pan-STARRS 1 | EOS | 1.1 km | MPC · JPL |
| 803190 | 2015 KU_{252} | — | November 19, 2012 | Kitt Peak | Spacewatch | · | 1.4 km | MPC · JPL |
| 803191 | 2015 KD_{255} | — | May 20, 2015 | Cerro Tololo | DECam | THM | 1.7 km | MPC · JPL |
| 803192 | 2015 KG_{265} | — | October 18, 2011 | Mount Lemmon | Mount Lemmon Survey | · | 1.7 km | MPC · JPL |
| 803193 | 2015 KJ_{266} | — | May 20, 2015 | Cerro Tololo | DECam | · | 1.1 km | MPC · JPL |
| 803194 | 2015 KM_{272} | — | May 20, 2015 | Cerro Tololo | DECam | · | 2.0 km | MPC · JPL |
| 803195 | 2015 KS_{274} | — | October 8, 2012 | Haleakala | Pan-STARRS 1 | · | 590 m | MPC · JPL |
| 803196 | 2015 KF_{276} | — | May 20, 2015 | Cerro Tololo | DECam | · | 2.2 km | MPC · JPL |
| 803197 | 2015 KK_{279} | — | May 20, 2015 | Cerro Tololo | DECam | · | 1.6 km | MPC · JPL |
| 803198 | 2015 KT_{285} | — | September 29, 2008 | Mount Lemmon | Mount Lemmon Survey | · | 1.1 km | MPC · JPL |
| 803199 | 2015 KM_{295} | — | February 21, 2009 | Kitt Peak | Spacewatch | · | 1.6 km | MPC · JPL |
| 803200 | 2015 KQ_{296} | — | May 20, 2015 | Cerro Tololo | DECam | · | 1.1 km | MPC · JPL |

== 803201–803300 ==
back to top

| Designation | | | Discovery | | | Properties | | Ref |
| Permanent | Provisional | Named after | Date | Site | Discoverer(s) | Category | Diam. | Ref |
|---|---|---|---|---|---|---|---|---|
| 803201 | 2015 KS_{311} | — | August 3, 2016 | Haleakala | Pan-STARRS 1 | · | 1.2 km | MPC · JPL |
| 803202 | 2015 KZ_{317} | — | May 20, 2015 | Cerro Tololo | DECam | · | 1.9 km | MPC · JPL |
| 803203 | 2015 KF_{324} | — | May 21, 2015 | Haleakala | Pan-STARRS 1 | · | 2.1 km | MPC · JPL |
| 803204 | 2015 KX_{324} | — | May 21, 2015 | Haleakala | Pan-STARRS 1 | · | 2.2 km | MPC · JPL |
| 803205 | 2015 KQ_{325} | — | May 20, 2015 | Cerro Tololo | DECam | · | 1.6 km | MPC · JPL |
| 803206 | 2015 KU_{325} | — | May 21, 2015 | Cerro Tololo | DECam | · | 1.4 km | MPC · JPL |
| 803207 | 2015 KY_{325} | — | May 24, 2015 | Mount Lemmon | Mount Lemmon Survey | · | 2.6 km | MPC · JPL |
| 803208 | 2015 KN_{326} | — | May 20, 2015 | Cerro Tololo | DECam | · | 1.5 km | MPC · JPL |
| 803209 | 2015 KG_{327} | — | July 8, 2016 | Haleakala | Pan-STARRS 1 | · | 1.2 km | MPC · JPL |
| 803210 | 2015 KQ_{327} | — | October 22, 2006 | Kitt Peak | Spacewatch | · | 2.1 km | MPC · JPL |
| 803211 | 2015 KA_{328} | — | May 20, 2015 | Cerro Tololo | DECam | EOS | 1.2 km | MPC · JPL |
| 803212 | 2015 KA_{329} | — | May 20, 2015 | Cerro Tololo | DECam | EOS | 1.1 km | MPC · JPL |
| 803213 | 2015 KL_{329} | — | May 21, 2015 | Haleakala | Pan-STARRS 1 | · | 1.6 km | MPC · JPL |
| 803214 | 2015 KL_{330} | — | May 21, 2015 | Cerro Tololo | DECam | · | 1.7 km | MPC · JPL |
| 803215 | 2015 KU_{330} | — | May 20, 2015 | Cerro Tololo | DECam | · | 1.6 km | MPC · JPL |
| 803216 | 2015 KY_{333} | — | May 21, 2015 | Haleakala | Pan-STARRS 1 | · | 1.2 km | MPC · JPL |
| 803217 | 2015 KE_{334} | — | May 20, 2015 | Cerro Tololo | DECam | · | 740 m | MPC · JPL |
| 803218 | 2015 KW_{346} | — | May 20, 2015 | Cerro Tololo | DECam | · | 1.9 km | MPC · JPL |
| 803219 | 2015 KK_{356} | — | May 20, 2015 | Cerro Tololo | DECam | · | 1.8 km | MPC · JPL |
| 803220 | 2015 KP_{359} | — | May 21, 2015 | Haleakala | Pan-STARRS 1 | · | 1.1 km | MPC · JPL |
| 803221 | 2015 KU_{368} | — | May 21, 2015 | Cerro Tololo | DECam | · | 1.9 km | MPC · JPL |
| 803222 | 2015 KQ_{369} | — | November 3, 2012 | Mount Lemmon | Mount Lemmon Survey | THM | 1.5 km | MPC · JPL |
| 803223 | 2015 KN_{370} | — | May 21, 2015 | Haleakala | Pan-STARRS 1 | · | 1.4 km | MPC · JPL |
| 803224 | 2015 KJ_{372} | — | May 21, 2015 | Haleakala | Pan-STARRS 1 | · | 1.7 km | MPC · JPL |
| 803225 | 2015 KM_{373} | — | May 20, 2015 | Cerro Tololo | DECam | · | 2.0 km | MPC · JPL |
| 803226 | 2015 KB_{457} | — | May 21, 2015 | Haleakala | Pan-STARRS 1 | L4 · critical | 5.5 km | MPC · JPL |
| 803227 | 2015 KL_{457} | — | May 19, 2015 | Cerro Tololo | DECam | · | 1.9 km | MPC · JPL |
| 803228 | 2015 LQ_{2} | — | April 16, 2015 | Mount Lemmon | Mount Lemmon Survey | · | 1.2 km | MPC · JPL |
| 803229 | 2015 LP_{4} | — | April 20, 2015 | Haleakala | Pan-STARRS 1 | · | 1.5 km | MPC · JPL |
| 803230 | 2015 LU_{6} | — | March 18, 2015 | Haleakala | Pan-STARRS 1 | H | 460 m | MPC · JPL |
| 803231 | 2015 LA_{7} | — | May 21, 2015 | Haleakala | Pan-STARRS 1 | H | 360 m | MPC · JPL |
| 803232 | 2015 LF_{8} | — | May 25, 2015 | Haleakala | Pan-STARRS 1 | · | 1.3 km | MPC · JPL |
| 803233 | 2015 LY_{10} | — | April 5, 2011 | Catalina | CSS | · | 1.0 km | MPC · JPL |
| 803234 | 2015 LT_{11} | — | May 22, 2015 | Haleakala | Pan-STARRS 1 | · | 2.1 km | MPC · JPL |
| 803235 | 2015 LQ_{12} | — | April 20, 2015 | Haleakala | Pan-STARRS 1 | · | 2.1 km | MPC · JPL |
| 803236 | 2015 LX_{19} | — | June 11, 2015 | Haleakala | Pan-STARRS 1 | · | 2.6 km | MPC · JPL |
| 803237 | 2015 LC_{31} | — | June 13, 2015 | Haleakala | Pan-STARRS 1 | · | 2.2 km | MPC · JPL |
| 803238 | 2015 LL_{31} | — | June 13, 2015 | Haleakala | Pan-STARRS 1 | · | 2.3 km | MPC · JPL |
| 803239 | 2015 LT_{33} | — | October 18, 2012 | Haleakala | Pan-STARRS 1 | · | 630 m | MPC · JPL |
| 803240 | 2015 LZ_{33} | — | June 13, 2015 | Haleakala | Pan-STARRS 1 | · | 560 m | MPC · JPL |
| 803241 | 2015 LJ_{34} | — | June 13, 2015 | Haleakala | Pan-STARRS 1 | · | 2.1 km | MPC · JPL |
| 803242 | 2015 LP_{34} | — | June 13, 2015 | Haleakala | Pan-STARRS 1 | · | 950 m | MPC · JPL |
| 803243 | 2015 LS_{45} | — | June 15, 2015 | Haleakala | Pan-STARRS 1 | · | 2.1 km | MPC · JPL |
| 803244 | 2015 LW_{45} | — | June 15, 2015 | Haleakala | Pan-STARRS 1 | · | 2.0 km | MPC · JPL |
| 803245 | 2015 LJ_{46} | — | September 16, 2010 | Kitt Peak | Spacewatch | · | 1.8 km | MPC · JPL |
| 803246 | 2015 LQ_{46} | — | June 6, 2015 | Haleakala | Pan-STARRS 1 | PHO | 700 m | MPC · JPL |
| 803247 | 2015 LC_{51} | — | June 15, 2015 | Haleakala | Pan-STARRS 1 | · | 2.4 km | MPC · JPL |
| 803248 | 2015 LG_{51} | — | June 13, 2015 | Haleakala | Pan-STARRS 1 | · | 1.7 km | MPC · JPL |
| 803249 | 2015 LH_{51} | — | June 11, 2015 | Haleakala | Pan-STARRS 1 | · | 2.0 km | MPC · JPL |
| 803250 | 2015 LN_{51} | — | June 7, 2015 | Haleakala | Pan-STARRS 1 | · | 1.7 km | MPC · JPL |
| 803251 | 2015 LO_{51} | — | June 15, 2015 | Haleakala | Pan-STARRS 1 | · | 1.8 km | MPC · JPL |
| 803252 | 2015 LQ_{51} | — | June 11, 2015 | Haleakala | Pan-STARRS 1 | · | 1.8 km | MPC · JPL |
| 803253 | 2015 LX_{51} | — | June 12, 2015 | Mount Lemmon | Mount Lemmon Survey | · | 1.1 km | MPC · JPL |
| 803254 | 2015 LE_{52} | — | June 15, 2015 | Haleakala | Pan-STARRS 1 | · | 1.8 km | MPC · JPL |
| 803255 | 2015 LT_{53} | — | June 11, 2015 | Haleakala | Pan-STARRS 1 | · | 1.2 km | MPC · JPL |
| 803256 | 2015 LX_{54} | — | June 12, 2015 | Haleakala | Pan-STARRS 1 | · | 2.4 km | MPC · JPL |
| 803257 | 2015 LF_{55} | — | June 11, 2015 | Haleakala | Pan-STARRS 1 | · | 690 m | MPC · JPL |
| 803258 | 2015 LV_{56} | — | June 11, 2015 | Haleakala | Pan-STARRS 1 | · | 1.7 km | MPC · JPL |
| 803259 | 2015 LA_{57} | — | June 11, 2015 | Haleakala | Pan-STARRS 1 | · | 1.6 km | MPC · JPL |
| 803260 | 2015 LS_{57} | — | June 10, 2015 | Haleakala | Pan-STARRS 1 | · | 1.6 km | MPC · JPL |
| 803261 | 2015 LU_{57} | — | June 15, 2015 | Haleakala | Pan-STARRS 1 | · | 2.0 km | MPC · JPL |
| 803262 | 2015 LA_{60} | — | June 15, 2015 | Haleakala | Pan-STARRS 1 | · | 2.3 km | MPC · JPL |
| 803263 | 2015 LM_{60} | — | June 11, 2015 | Haleakala | Pan-STARRS 1 | · | 1.8 km | MPC · JPL |
| 803264 | 2015 LG_{64} | — | June 13, 2015 | Haleakala | Pan-STARRS 1 | · | 1.8 km | MPC · JPL |
| 803265 | 2015 LL_{66} | — | June 11, 2015 | Haleakala | Pan-STARRS 1 | · | 1.1 km | MPC · JPL |
| 803266 | 2015 LM_{66} | — | June 11, 2015 | Haleakala | Pan-STARRS 1 | · | 1.4 km | MPC · JPL |
| 803267 | 2015 MF_{2} | — | December 2, 2008 | Mount Lemmon | Mount Lemmon Survey | H | 510 m | MPC · JPL |
| 803268 | 2015 MY_{2} | — | June 16, 2015 | Haleakala | Pan-STARRS 1 | · | 2.0 km | MPC · JPL |
| 803269 | 2015 MX_{6} | — | June 16, 2015 | Haleakala | Pan-STARRS 1 | · | 2.7 km | MPC · JPL |
| 803270 | 2015 MK_{13} | — | June 17, 2015 | Haleakala | Pan-STARRS 1 | · | 2.1 km | MPC · JPL |
| 803271 | 2015 MY_{14} | — | April 22, 2009 | Mount Lemmon | Mount Lemmon Survey | LIX | 2.1 km | MPC · JPL |
| 803272 | 2015 MJ_{16} | — | February 20, 2015 | Haleakala | Pan-STARRS 1 | H | 460 m | MPC · JPL |
| 803273 | 2015 MP_{17} | — | April 25, 2015 | Haleakala | Pan-STARRS 1 | · | 870 m | MPC · JPL |
| 803274 | 2015 MX_{17} | — | May 21, 2015 | Haleakala | Pan-STARRS 1 | EOS | 1.4 km | MPC · JPL |
| 803275 | 2015 MJ_{27} | — | May 12, 2015 | Mount Lemmon | Mount Lemmon Survey | EOS | 1.3 km | MPC · JPL |
| 803276 | 2015 MD_{32} | — | May 21, 2015 | Haleakala | Pan-STARRS 1 | · | 1.6 km | MPC · JPL |
| 803277 | 2015 MF_{32} | — | June 18, 2015 | Haleakala | Pan-STARRS 1 | H | 310 m | MPC · JPL |
| 803278 | 2015 ME_{35} | — | November 9, 2004 | Mauna Kea | Veillet, C. | HNS | 690 m | MPC · JPL |
| 803279 | 2015 MN_{35} | — | May 22, 2015 | Haleakala | Pan-STARRS 1 | · | 2.2 km | MPC · JPL |
| 803280 | 2015 MS_{35} | — | May 21, 2015 | Haleakala | Pan-STARRS 1 | · | 2.3 km | MPC · JPL |
| 803281 | 2015 MO_{36} | — | March 21, 2015 | Haleakala | Pan-STARRS 1 | · | 1.4 km | MPC · JPL |
| 803282 | 2015 MB_{38} | — | May 22, 2015 | Haleakala | Pan-STARRS 1 | · | 1.5 km | MPC · JPL |
| 803283 | 2015 MN_{38} | — | May 18, 2015 | Haleakala | Pan-STARRS 1 | EOS | 1.3 km | MPC · JPL |
| 803284 | 2015 MA_{40} | — | September 5, 2008 | Kitt Peak | Spacewatch | MAR | 700 m | MPC · JPL |
| 803285 | 2015 MM_{40} | — | May 26, 2015 | Mount Lemmon | Mount Lemmon Survey | · | 1.8 km | MPC · JPL |
| 803286 | 2015 MH_{41} | — | May 21, 2015 | Haleakala | Pan-STARRS 1 | EOS | 1.4 km | MPC · JPL |
| 803287 | 2015 MX_{47} | — | April 30, 2009 | Kitt Peak | Spacewatch | · | 2.0 km | MPC · JPL |
| 803288 | 2015 MR_{56} | — | October 2, 2008 | Kitt Peak | Spacewatch | · | 950 m | MPC · JPL |
| 803289 | 2015 MH_{60} | — | November 3, 2008 | Mount Lemmon | Mount Lemmon Survey | H | 330 m | MPC · JPL |
| 803290 | 2015 MK_{60} | — | June 20, 2015 | Haleakala | Pan-STARRS 1 | · | 1.8 km | MPC · JPL |
| 803291 | 2015 MR_{61} | — | June 20, 2015 | Haleakala | Pan-STARRS 1 | · | 1.9 km | MPC · JPL |
| 803292 | 2015 MT_{63} | — | February 26, 2014 | Haleakala | Pan-STARRS 1 | · | 1.8 km | MPC · JPL |
| 803293 | 2015 MY_{65} | — | April 28, 2011 | Mount Lemmon | Mount Lemmon Survey | · | 770 m | MPC · JPL |
| 803294 | 2015 MD_{72} | — | June 18, 2015 | Haleakala | Pan-STARRS 1 | · | 1.1 km | MPC · JPL |
| 803295 | 2015 MQ_{75} | — | July 26, 2011 | Haleakala | Pan-STARRS 1 | · | 950 m | MPC · JPL |
| 803296 | 2015 MY_{76} | — | June 22, 2015 | Haleakala | Pan-STARRS 1 | · | 2.0 km | MPC · JPL |
| 803297 | 2015 MH_{79} | — | June 18, 2015 | Haleakala | Pan-STARRS 1 | · | 1.6 km | MPC · JPL |
| 803298 | 2015 MV_{79} | — | June 12, 2015 | Mount Lemmon | Mount Lemmon Survey | TIR | 2.3 km | MPC · JPL |
| 803299 | 2015 MT_{86} | — | September 10, 2010 | Mount Lemmon | Mount Lemmon Survey | LIX | 2.3 km | MPC · JPL |
| 803300 | 2015 MO_{87} | — | April 29, 2014 | Haleakala | Pan-STARRS 1 | · | 2.4 km | MPC · JPL |

== 803301–803400 ==
back to top

| Designation | | | Discovery | | | Properties | | Ref |
| Permanent | Provisional | Named after | Date | Site | Discoverer(s) | Category | Diam. | Ref |
|---|---|---|---|---|---|---|---|---|
| 803301 | 2015 MD_{88} | — | June 22, 2015 | Haleakala | Pan-STARRS 1 | · | 1.8 km | MPC · JPL |
| 803302 | 2015 MG_{88} | — | June 22, 2015 | Haleakala | Pan-STARRS 1 | · | 1.4 km | MPC · JPL |
| 803303 | 2015 MJ_{88} | — | June 22, 2015 | Haleakala | Pan-STARRS 1 | · | 2.2 km | MPC · JPL |
| 803304 | 2015 MP_{90} | — | October 31, 2010 | Mount Lemmon | Mount Lemmon Survey | · | 2.6 km | MPC · JPL |
| 803305 | 2015 ME_{92} | — | May 30, 2015 | Haleakala | Pan-STARRS 1 | H | 380 m | MPC · JPL |
| 803306 | 2015 ML_{94} | — | June 23, 2015 | Haleakala | Pan-STARRS 1 | · | 2.0 km | MPC · JPL |
| 803307 | 2015 ME_{96} | — | January 13, 2008 | Mount Lemmon | Mount Lemmon Survey | · | 2.5 km | MPC · JPL |
| 803308 | 2015 MT_{96} | — | May 30, 1998 | Kitt Peak | Spacewatch | AMO · PHA | 580 m | MPC · JPL |
| 803309 | 2015 MC_{99} | — | June 23, 2015 | Haleakala | Pan-STARRS 1 | · | 2.1 km | MPC · JPL |
| 803310 | 2015 MM_{104} | — | June 13, 2015 | Haleakala | Pan-STARRS 1 | · | 930 m | MPC · JPL |
| 803311 | 2015 MW_{108} | — | June 26, 2015 | Haleakala | Pan-STARRS 1 | · | 1.1 km | MPC · JPL |
| 803312 | 2015 ME_{110} | — | June 20, 2015 | Haleakala | Pan-STARRS 1 | · | 2.4 km | MPC · JPL |
| 803313 | 2015 MM_{110} | — | June 15, 2015 | Haleakala | Pan-STARRS 1 | · | 2.0 km | MPC · JPL |
| 803314 | 2015 ME_{111} | — | June 20, 2015 | Haleakala | Pan-STARRS 1 | · | 590 m | MPC · JPL |
| 803315 | 2015 MT_{112} | — | June 26, 2015 | Haleakala | Pan-STARRS 1 | · | 1.3 km | MPC · JPL |
| 803316 | 2015 MJ_{113} | — | May 30, 2015 | Haleakala | Pan-STARRS 1 | · | 1.2 km | MPC · JPL |
| 803317 | 2015 MJ_{114} | — | May 7, 2014 | Haleakala | Pan-STARRS 1 | TIR | 2.1 km | MPC · JPL |
| 803318 | 2015 MR_{114} | — | June 27, 2015 | Haleakala | Pan-STARRS 1 | · | 1.9 km | MPC · JPL |
| 803319 | 2015 MY_{120} | — | June 27, 2015 | Haleakala | Pan-STARRS 1 | EUN | 870 m | MPC · JPL |
| 803320 | 2015 MJ_{121} | — | June 27, 2015 | Haleakala | Pan-STARRS 1 | · | 2.5 km | MPC · JPL |
| 803321 | 2015 MR_{121} | — | June 27, 2015 | Haleakala | Pan-STARRS 1 | · | 2.8 km | MPC · JPL |
| 803322 | 2015 MB_{125} | — | June 28, 2015 | Haleakala | Pan-STARRS 1 | · | 2.8 km | MPC · JPL |
| 803323 | 2015 MC_{126} | — | March 26, 2003 | Kitt Peak | Spacewatch | · | 1.9 km | MPC · JPL |
| 803324 | 2015 MV_{128} | — | June 29, 2015 | Haleakala | Pan-STARRS 1 | H | 420 m | MPC · JPL |
| 803325 | 2015 MW_{129} | — | June 29, 2015 | Haleakala | Pan-STARRS 1 | · | 2.2 km | MPC · JPL |
| 803326 | 2015 MF_{132} | — | June 16, 2015 | Haleakala | Pan-STARRS 1 | · | 1.8 km | MPC · JPL |
| 803327 | 2015 MF_{133} | — | June 25, 2015 | Haleakala | Pan-STARRS 1 | · | 1.7 km | MPC · JPL |
| 803328 | 2015 MP_{133} | — | June 27, 2015 | Haleakala | Pan-STARRS 1 | · | 2.0 km | MPC · JPL |
| 803329 | 2015 MK_{135} | — | February 19, 2013 | Kitt Peak | Spacewatch | ELF | 2.4 km | MPC · JPL |
| 803330 | 2015 MD_{136} | — | June 17, 2015 | Haleakala | Pan-STARRS 1 | BRG | 850 m | MPC · JPL |
| 803331 | 2015 MR_{137} | — | June 18, 2015 | Haleakala | Pan-STARRS 1 | (1298) | 1.8 km | MPC · JPL |
| 803332 | 2015 MH_{141} | — | June 14, 2015 | Mount Lemmon | Mount Lemmon Survey | · | 2.3 km | MPC · JPL |
| 803333 | 2015 MD_{142} | — | January 17, 2013 | Haleakala | Pan-STARRS 1 | TIR | 2.6 km | MPC · JPL |
| 803334 | 2015 MY_{143} | — | March 10, 2014 | Mount Lemmon | Mount Lemmon Survey | MAR | 710 m | MPC · JPL |
| 803335 | 2015 MA_{146} | — | June 26, 2015 | Haleakala | Pan-STARRS 1 | · | 1.1 km | MPC · JPL |
| 803336 | 2015 ME_{146} | — | June 26, 2015 | Haleakala | Pan-STARRS 1 | THM | 1.7 km | MPC · JPL |
| 803337 | 2015 MK_{148} | — | April 5, 2014 | Haleakala | Pan-STARRS 1 | · | 2.1 km | MPC · JPL |
| 803338 | 2015 MC_{149} | — | October 25, 2011 | Haleakala | Pan-STARRS 1 | · | 1.4 km | MPC · JPL |
| 803339 | 2015 MP_{149} | — | June 29, 2015 | Haleakala | Pan-STARRS 1 | · | 1.3 km | MPC · JPL |
| 803340 | 2015 MO_{150} | — | July 7, 2016 | Haleakala | Pan-STARRS 1 | · | 3.2 km | MPC · JPL |
| 803341 | 2015 MB_{152} | — | June 22, 2015 | Haleakala | Pan-STARRS 1 | · | 2.3 km | MPC · JPL |
| 803342 | 2015 MH_{156} | — | September 17, 2017 | Haleakala | Pan-STARRS 1 | · | 2.8 km | MPC · JPL |
| 803343 | 2015 MO_{156} | — | June 22, 2015 | Haleakala | Pan-STARRS 1 | · | 2.9 km | MPC · JPL |
| 803344 | 2015 MC_{160} | — | October 25, 2016 | Haleakala | Pan-STARRS 1 | AGN | 860 m | MPC · JPL |
| 803345 | 2015 ME_{160} | — | June 26, 2015 | Haleakala | Pan-STARRS 1 | · | 2.2 km | MPC · JPL |
| 803346 | 2015 MG_{164} | — | June 23, 2015 | Mount Lemmon | Mount Lemmon Survey | H | 360 m | MPC · JPL |
| 803347 | 2015 MH_{165} | — | June 26, 2015 | Haleakala | Pan-STARRS 1 | · | 2.1 km | MPC · JPL |
| 803348 | 2015 MR_{165} | — | June 26, 2015 | Haleakala | Pan-STARRS 1 | H | 450 m | MPC · JPL |
| 803349 | 2015 MT_{165} | — | June 20, 2015 | Haleakala | Pan-STARRS 1 | · | 2.3 km | MPC · JPL |
| 803350 | 2015 MU_{165} | — | June 23, 2015 | Haleakala | Pan-STARRS 1 | · | 2.5 km | MPC · JPL |
| 803351 | 2015 MY_{165} | — | June 26, 2015 | Haleakala | Pan-STARRS 1 | · | 1.7 km | MPC · JPL |
| 803352 | 2015 MC_{166} | — | June 26, 2015 | Haleakala | Pan-STARRS 1 | · | 1.7 km | MPC · JPL |
| 803353 | 2015 MN_{166} | — | June 18, 2015 | Haleakala | Pan-STARRS 1 | · | 1.4 km | MPC · JPL |
| 803354 | 2015 MN_{168} | — | June 18, 2015 | Haleakala | Pan-STARRS 1 | · | 2.2 km | MPC · JPL |
| 803355 | 2015 MQ_{169} | — | June 17, 2015 | Haleakala | Pan-STARRS 1 | ELF | 2.1 km | MPC · JPL |
| 803356 | 2015 MR_{170} | — | June 20, 2015 | Cerro Tololo-DECam | DECam | · | 910 m | MPC · JPL |
| 803357 | 2015 MO_{171} | — | June 18, 2015 | Haleakala | Pan-STARRS 1 | · | 1.4 km | MPC · JPL |
| 803358 | 2015 MS_{171} | — | June 26, 2015 | Haleakala | Pan-STARRS 1 | WIT | 630 m | MPC · JPL |
| 803359 | 2015 MD_{172} | — | June 20, 2015 | Haleakala | Pan-STARRS 1 | · | 2.2 km | MPC · JPL |
| 803360 | 2015 MF_{172} | — | June 18, 2015 | Haleakala | Pan-STARRS 1 | · | 1.9 km | MPC · JPL |
| 803361 | 2015 ML_{174} | — | June 18, 2015 | Haleakala | Pan-STARRS 1 | · | 1.1 km | MPC · JPL |
| 803362 | 2015 MP_{174} | — | June 22, 2015 | Haleakala | Pan-STARRS 1 | · | 1.3 km | MPC · JPL |
| 803363 | 2015 MN_{175} | — | June 18, 2015 | Haleakala | Pan-STARRS 1 | · | 990 m | MPC · JPL |
| 803364 | 2015 MR_{176} | — | June 18, 2015 | Haleakala | Pan-STARRS 1 | · | 860 m | MPC · JPL |
| 803365 | 2015 MX_{176} | — | June 23, 2015 | Haleakala | Pan-STARRS 1 | · | 1.9 km | MPC · JPL |
| 803366 | 2015 MT_{178} | — | June 20, 2015 | Haleakala | Pan-STARRS 1 | · | 1.2 km | MPC · JPL |
| 803367 | 2015 MS_{180} | — | June 28, 2015 | Haleakala | Pan-STARRS 1 | · | 890 m | MPC · JPL |
| 803368 | 2015 MT_{180} | — | June 19, 2015 | Haleakala | Pan-STARRS 1 | · | 2.0 km | MPC · JPL |
| 803369 | 2015 MZ_{180} | — | June 18, 2015 | Haleakala | Pan-STARRS 1 | · | 2.5 km | MPC · JPL |
| 803370 | 2015 MK_{181} | — | June 19, 2015 | Haleakala | Pan-STARRS 1 | · | 1.0 km | MPC · JPL |
| 803371 | 2015 ML_{181} | — | June 26, 2015 | Haleakala | Pan-STARRS 1 | · | 830 m | MPC · JPL |
| 803372 | 2015 MY_{182} | — | June 22, 2015 | Haleakala | Pan-STARRS 1 | EOS | 1.5 km | MPC · JPL |
| 803373 | 2015 MD_{183} | — | June 26, 2015 | Haleakala | Pan-STARRS 1 | VER | 2.2 km | MPC · JPL |
| 803374 | 2015 MW_{183} | — | June 18, 2015 | Haleakala | Pan-STARRS 1 | · | 1.9 km | MPC · JPL |
| 803375 | 2015 MX_{183} | — | June 17, 2015 | Mount Lemmon | Mount Lemmon Survey | URS | 2.2 km | MPC · JPL |
| 803376 | 2015 MM_{186} | — | June 22, 2015 | Haleakala | Pan-STARRS 1 | · | 2.0 km | MPC · JPL |
| 803377 | 2015 MO_{186} | — | June 22, 2015 | Haleakala | Pan-STARRS 2 | · | 1.9 km | MPC · JPL |
| 803378 | 2015 MN_{187} | — | June 27, 2015 | Haleakala | Pan-STARRS 1 | (43176) | 2.0 km | MPC · JPL |
| 803379 | 2015 MD_{188} | — | June 29, 2015 | Haleakala | Pan-STARRS 1 | · | 2.0 km | MPC · JPL |
| 803380 | 2015 MA_{189} | — | June 19, 2015 | Haleakala | Pan-STARRS 1 | · | 1.7 km | MPC · JPL |
| 803381 | 2015 MD_{189} | — | June 27, 2015 | Haleakala | Pan-STARRS 1 | · | 1.7 km | MPC · JPL |
| 803382 | 2015 MN_{190} | — | June 27, 2015 | Haleakala | Pan-STARRS 1 | EOS | 1.2 km | MPC · JPL |
| 803383 | 2015 MZ_{191} | — | June 29, 2015 | Haleakala | Pan-STARRS 1 | T_{j} (2.99) | 2.2 km | MPC · JPL |
| 803384 | 2015 MD_{192} | — | June 17, 2015 | Haleakala | Pan-STARRS 1 | · | 1.2 km | MPC · JPL |
| 803385 | 2015 ME_{194} | — | June 21, 2015 | Haleakala | Pan-STARRS 1 | · | 1.9 km | MPC · JPL |
| 803386 | 2015 MK_{194} | — | June 21, 2015 | Mount Lemmon | Mount Lemmon Survey | · | 1.1 km | MPC · JPL |
| 803387 | 2015 MX_{194} | — | June 26, 2015 | Haleakala | Pan-STARRS 1 | · | 970 m | MPC · JPL |
| 803388 | 2015 MV_{195} | — | June 26, 2015 | Haleakala | Pan-STARRS 1 | · | 1.9 km | MPC · JPL |
| 803389 | 2015 MJ_{196} | — | June 18, 2015 | Haleakala | Pan-STARRS 1 | · | 2.0 km | MPC · JPL |
| 803390 | 2015 MC_{201} | — | June 19, 2015 | Haleakala | Pan-STARRS 1 | · | 2.3 km | MPC · JPL |
| 803391 | 2015 MD_{202} | — | June 26, 2015 | Haleakala | Pan-STARRS 1 | EOS | 1.5 km | MPC · JPL |
| 803392 | 2015 MF_{202} | — | June 18, 2015 | Haleakala | Pan-STARRS 1 | URS | 2.0 km | MPC · JPL |
| 803393 | 2015 MG_{202} | — | June 26, 2015 | Haleakala | Pan-STARRS 1 | · | 2.0 km | MPC · JPL |
| 803394 | 2015 MS_{203} | — | June 27, 2015 | Haleakala | Pan-STARRS 2 | · | 1.0 km | MPC · JPL |
| 803395 | 2015 MY_{203} | — | June 26, 2015 | Haleakala | Pan-STARRS 1 | · | 1.2 km | MPC · JPL |
| 803396 | 2015 MW_{205} | — | June 18, 2015 | Haleakala | Pan-STARRS 1 | KON | 1.6 km | MPC · JPL |
| 803397 | 2015 ML_{208} | — | June 17, 2015 | Haleakala | Pan-STARRS 1 | · | 1.5 km | MPC · JPL |
| 803398 | 2015 MN_{211} | — | June 26, 2015 | Haleakala | Pan-STARRS 1 | · | 1.4 km | MPC · JPL |
| 803399 | 2015 NC_{9} | — | October 8, 2012 | Haleakala | Pan-STARRS 1 | · | 640 m | MPC · JPL |
| 803400 | 2015 NM_{9} | — | December 28, 2005 | Kitt Peak | Spacewatch | H | 490 m | MPC · JPL |

== 803401–803500 ==
back to top

| Designation | | | Discovery | | | Properties | | Ref |
| Permanent | Provisional | Named after | Date | Site | Discoverer(s) | Category | Diam. | Ref |
|---|---|---|---|---|---|---|---|---|
| 803401 | 2015 NS_{13} | — | June 25, 2015 | Haleakala | Pan-STARRS 1 | APO | 360 m | MPC · JPL |
| 803402 | 2015 ND_{15} | — | March 12, 2010 | Kitt Peak | Spacewatch | · | 830 m | MPC · JPL |
| 803403 | 2015 NH_{16} | — | July 12, 2015 | Haleakala | Pan-STARRS 1 | · | 2.2 km | MPC · JPL |
| 803404 | 2015 NP_{19} | — | June 17, 2015 | Haleakala | Pan-STARRS 1 | PHO | 680 m | MPC · JPL |
| 803405 | 2015 NK_{21} | — | March 30, 2015 | Haleakala | Pan-STARRS 1 | · | 700 m | MPC · JPL |
| 803406 | 2015 NO_{21} | — | May 14, 2015 | Haleakala | Pan-STARRS 1 | TIR | 2.1 km | MPC · JPL |
| 803407 | 2015 ND_{23} | — | July 12, 2015 | Haleakala | Pan-STARRS 1 | H | 420 m | MPC · JPL |
| 803408 | 2015 NV_{24} | — | February 26, 2009 | Kitt Peak | Spacewatch | · | 1.4 km | MPC · JPL |
| 803409 | 2015 NR_{27} | — | July 12, 2015 | Haleakala | Pan-STARRS 1 | · | 1.9 km | MPC · JPL |
| 803410 | 2015 NT_{27} | — | September 17, 2010 | Kitt Peak | Spacewatch | THM | 2.0 km | MPC · JPL |
| 803411 | 2015 NC_{28} | — | July 12, 2015 | Haleakala | Pan-STARRS 1 | EUN | 770 m | MPC · JPL |
| 803412 | 2015 NC_{29} | — | July 9, 2015 | Haleakala | Pan-STARRS 1 | · | 2.1 km | MPC · JPL |
| 803413 | 2015 NB_{30} | — | July 13, 2016 | Haleakala | Pan-STARRS 1 | · | 1.4 km | MPC · JPL |
| 803414 | 2015 NU_{30} | — | September 27, 2016 | Haleakala | Pan-STARRS 1 | · | 890 m | MPC · JPL |
| 803415 | 2015 NG_{31} | — | July 14, 2015 | Haleakala | Pan-STARRS 1 | · | 2.3 km | MPC · JPL |
| 803416 | 2015 NJ_{32} | — | July 7, 2015 | Haleakala | Pan-STARRS 1 | · | 1.8 km | MPC · JPL |
| 803417 | 2015 NX_{32} | — | July 9, 2015 | Haleakala | Pan-STARRS 1 | · | 2.4 km | MPC · JPL |
| 803418 | 2015 NW_{33} | — | July 9, 2015 | Haleakala | Pan-STARRS 1 | · | 1.3 km | MPC · JPL |
| 803419 | 2015 NT_{34} | — | July 9, 2015 | Haleakala | Pan-STARRS 1 | · | 900 m | MPC · JPL |
| 803420 | 2015 NB_{36} | — | July 12, 2015 | Haleakala | Pan-STARRS 1 | · | 2.9 km | MPC · JPL |
| 803421 | 2015 NU_{36} | — | July 12, 2015 | Haleakala | Pan-STARRS 1 | · | 2.1 km | MPC · JPL |
| 803422 | 2015 NT_{40} | — | July 15, 2015 | Haleakala | Pan-STARRS 1 | · | 2.1 km | MPC · JPL |
| 803423 | 2015 NK_{41} | — | July 7, 2015 | Haleakala | Pan-STARRS 1 | H | 340 m | MPC · JPL |
| 803424 | 2015 OL | — | September 30, 2008 | Catalina | CSS | · | 650 m | MPC · JPL |
| 803425 | 2015 OH_{2} | — | November 26, 2005 | Mount Lemmon | Mount Lemmon Survey | · | 540 m | MPC · JPL |
| 803426 | 2015 OO_{2} | — | June 21, 2015 | Mount Lemmon | Mount Lemmon Survey | · | 520 m | MPC · JPL |
| 803427 | 2015 OA_{4} | — | June 19, 2015 | Haleakala | Pan-STARRS 1 | · | 1.8 km | MPC · JPL |
| 803428 | 2015 OD_{4} | — | June 15, 2015 | Mount Lemmon | Mount Lemmon Survey | PHO | 760 m | MPC · JPL |
| 803429 | 2015 OG_{5} | — | September 29, 2010 | Mount Lemmon | Mount Lemmon Survey | · | 1.9 km | MPC · JPL |
| 803430 | 2015 OG_{9} | — | July 18, 2015 | Haleakala | Pan-STARRS 1 | · | 2.2 km | MPC · JPL |
| 803431 | 2015 OM_{13} | — | April 5, 2011 | Mount Lemmon | Mount Lemmon Survey | · | 560 m | MPC · JPL |
| 803432 | 2015 OP_{13} | — | June 29, 2015 | Haleakala | Pan-STARRS 1 | · | 540 m | MPC · JPL |
| 803433 | 2015 OB_{20} | — | July 18, 2015 | Haleakala | Pan-STARRS 1 | · | 2.2 km | MPC · JPL |
| 803434 | 2015 OJ_{20} | — | October 30, 2010 | Mount Lemmon | Mount Lemmon Survey | · | 1.8 km | MPC · JPL |
| 803435 | 2015 ON_{29} | — | July 23, 2015 | Haleakala | Pan-STARRS 1 | · | 1.1 km | MPC · JPL |
| 803436 | 2015 OU_{29} | — | February 11, 2008 | Kitt Peak | Spacewatch | · | 1.1 km | MPC · JPL |
| 803437 | 2015 OK_{30} | — | July 23, 2015 | Haleakala | Pan-STARRS 2 | T_{j} (2.99) | 2.6 km | MPC · JPL |
| 803438 | 2015 OV_{30} | — | October 10, 2008 | Mount Lemmon | Mount Lemmon Survey | NYS | 960 m | MPC · JPL |
| 803439 | 2015 OW_{33} | — | July 24, 2015 | Haleakala | Pan-STARRS 1 | · | 2.0 km | MPC · JPL |
| 803440 | 2015 OQ_{34} | — | June 17, 2015 | Haleakala | Pan-STARRS 1 | · | 1.9 km | MPC · JPL |
| 803441 | 2015 OE_{44} | — | October 8, 2012 | Haleakala | Pan-STARRS 1 | · | 710 m | MPC · JPL |
| 803442 | 2015 OO_{45} | — | October 21, 2012 | Kitt Peak | Spacewatch | · | 930 m | MPC · JPL |
| 803443 | 2015 OB_{47} | — | July 24, 2015 | Haleakala | Pan-STARRS 1 | · | 1.3 km | MPC · JPL |
| 803444 | 2015 OT_{49} | — | June 17, 2015 | Haleakala | Pan-STARRS 1 | · | 2.4 km | MPC · JPL |
| 803445 | 2015 OH_{56} | — | July 26, 2015 | Haleakala | Pan-STARRS 1 | · | 1.2 km | MPC · JPL |
| 803446 | 2015 OP_{58} | — | May 4, 2014 | Haleakala | Pan-STARRS 1 | · | 1.8 km | MPC · JPL |
| 803447 | 2015 OF_{59} | — | October 1, 2010 | Kitt Peak | Spacewatch | · | 2.3 km | MPC · JPL |
| 803448 | 2015 OM_{67} | — | June 17, 2015 | Haleakala | Pan-STARRS 1 | LIX | 2.1 km | MPC · JPL |
| 803449 | 2015 OG_{69} | — | June 28, 2015 | Haleakala | Pan-STARRS 1 | TIR | 2.3 km | MPC · JPL |
| 803450 | 2015 OT_{70} | — | July 27, 2015 | Haleakala | Pan-STARRS 1 | · | 1.1 km | MPC · JPL |
| 803451 | 2015 OS_{72} | — | June 28, 2015 | Haleakala | Pan-STARRS 1 | · | 1.4 km | MPC · JPL |
| 803452 | 2015 OU_{72} | — | July 27, 2015 | Haleakala | Pan-STARRS 1 | · | 2.4 km | MPC · JPL |
| 803453 | 2015 OC_{75} | — | March 5, 2013 | Haleakala | Pan-STARRS 1 | EUP | 3.0 km | MPC · JPL |
| 803454 | 2015 OB_{80} | — | February 9, 2014 | Haleakala | Pan-STARRS 1 | H | 400 m | MPC · JPL |
| 803455 | 2015 OJ_{80} | — | July 25, 2015 | Haleakala | Pan-STARRS 1 | H | 470 m | MPC · JPL |
| 803456 | 2015 OC_{81} | — | July 23, 2015 | Haleakala | Pan-STARRS 2 | H | 440 m | MPC · JPL |
| 803457 | 2015 OS_{81} | — | July 19, 2015 | Haleakala | Pan-STARRS 2 | · | 1.5 km | MPC · JPL |
| 803458 | 2015 OP_{83} | — | July 25, 2015 | Haleakala | Pan-STARRS 1 | · | 1.4 km | MPC · JPL |
| 803459 | 2015 OA_{84} | — | July 28, 2015 | Haleakala | Pan-STARRS 1 | · | 1.9 km | MPC · JPL |
| 803460 | 2015 OD_{84} | — | July 19, 2015 | Haleakala | Pan-STARRS 1 | · | 1.6 km | MPC · JPL |
| 803461 | 2015 OK_{84} | — | July 31, 2015 | Haleakala | Pan-STARRS 1 | · | 2.4 km | MPC · JPL |
| 803462 | 2015 OV_{88} | — | July 26, 2015 | Haleakala | Pan-STARRS 2 | · | 2.2 km | MPC · JPL |
| 803463 | 2015 OY_{89} | — | July 26, 2015 | Haleakala | Pan-STARRS 1 | · | 2.9 km | MPC · JPL |
| 803464 | 2015 OP_{92} | — | July 19, 2015 | Haleakala | Pan-STARRS 1 | · | 1.9 km | MPC · JPL |
| 803465 | 2015 OS_{92} | — | March 31, 2014 | Mount Lemmon | Mount Lemmon Survey | · | 1.2 km | MPC · JPL |
| 803466 | 2015 OO_{93} | — | July 19, 2015 | Haleakala | Pan-STARRS 1 | · | 2.6 km | MPC · JPL |
| 803467 | 2015 OT_{95} | — | May 4, 2014 | Haleakala | Pan-STARRS 1 | · | 2.2 km | MPC · JPL |
| 803468 | 2015 OG_{98} | — | July 24, 2015 | Haleakala | Pan-STARRS 1 | · | 2.5 km | MPC · JPL |
| 803469 | 2015 OV_{100} | — | July 25, 2015 | Haleakala | Pan-STARRS 1 | · | 2.2 km | MPC · JPL |
| 803470 | 2015 OH_{104} | — | July 27, 2015 | Haleakala | Pan-STARRS 2 | TIR | 2.1 km | MPC · JPL |
| 803471 | 2015 OF_{106} | — | July 26, 2015 | Haleakala | Pan-STARRS 1 | V | 530 m | MPC · JPL |
| 803472 | 2015 OY_{106} | — | July 25, 2015 | Haleakala | Pan-STARRS 1 | (194) | 1.1 km | MPC · JPL |
| 803473 | 2015 OG_{111} | — | July 19, 2015 | Haleakala | Pan-STARRS 1 | · | 940 m | MPC · JPL |
| 803474 | 2015 OO_{115} | — | July 23, 2015 | Haleakala | Pan-STARRS 1 | · | 2.3 km | MPC · JPL |
| 803475 | 2015 OZ_{115} | — | July 26, 2015 | Haleakala | Pan-STARRS 1 | · | 1.7 km | MPC · JPL |
| 803476 | 2015 OZ_{116} | — | July 25, 2015 | Haleakala | Pan-STARRS 1 | H | 440 m | MPC · JPL |
| 803477 | 2015 OT_{119} | — | July 19, 2015 | Haleakala | Pan-STARRS 1 | · | 2.7 km | MPC · JPL |
| 803478 | 2015 OZ_{120} | — | July 19, 2015 | Haleakala | Pan-STARRS 1 | EUN | 960 m | MPC · JPL |
| 803479 | 2015 OV_{123} | — | July 25, 2015 | Haleakala | Pan-STARRS 1 | V | 570 m | MPC · JPL |
| 803480 | 2015 ON_{124} | — | July 19, 2015 | Haleakala | Pan-STARRS 1 | · | 1.6 km | MPC · JPL |
| 803481 | 2015 OZ_{124} | — | July 19, 2015 | Haleakala | Pan-STARRS 1 | TIR | 1.5 km | MPC · JPL |
| 803482 | 2015 OK_{125} | — | July 18, 2015 | Haleakala | Pan-STARRS 1 | · | 1.7 km | MPC · JPL |
| 803483 | 2015 OF_{126} | — | July 23, 2015 | Haleakala | Pan-STARRS 1 | · | 2.4 km | MPC · JPL |
| 803484 | 2015 OU_{128} | — | July 19, 2015 | Haleakala | Pan-STARRS 1 | AGN | 850 m | MPC · JPL |
| 803485 | 2015 OF_{129} | — | July 30, 2015 | Haleakala | Pan-STARRS 1 | · | 840 m | MPC · JPL |
| 803486 | 2015 ON_{132} | — | July 27, 2015 | Haleakala | Pan-STARRS 1 | INA | 2.0 km | MPC · JPL |
| 803487 | 2015 OL_{133} | — | July 27, 2015 | Haleakala | Pan-STARRS 1 | HOF | 2.0 km | MPC · JPL |
| 803488 | 2015 OG_{134} | — | July 19, 2015 | Haleakala | Pan-STARRS 1 | · | 1.6 km | MPC · JPL |
| 803489 | 2015 OD_{135} | — | July 28, 2015 | Haleakala | Pan-STARRS 1 | · | 1.7 km | MPC · JPL |
| 803490 | 2015 OE_{135} | — | July 19, 2015 | Haleakala | Pan-STARRS 1 | THM | 1.8 km | MPC · JPL |
| 803491 | 2015 OZ_{137} | — | July 25, 2015 | Haleakala | Pan-STARRS 1 | HOF | 1.8 km | MPC · JPL |
| 803492 | 2015 OT_{138} | — | July 28, 2015 | Haleakala | Pan-STARRS 1 | HOF | 2.0 km | MPC · JPL |
| 803493 | 2015 OE_{139} | — | July 28, 2015 | Haleakala | Pan-STARRS 1 | · | 1.0 km | MPC · JPL |
| 803494 | 2015 OH_{142} | — | July 28, 2015 | Haleakala | Pan-STARRS 1 | · | 2.3 km | MPC · JPL |
| 803495 | 2015 OQ_{142} | — | July 23, 2015 | Haleakala | Pan-STARRS 2 | · | 2.3 km | MPC · JPL |
| 803496 | 2015 OL_{143} | — | July 19, 2015 | Haleakala | Pan-STARRS 1 | · | 970 m | MPC · JPL |
| 803497 | 2015 OA_{144} | — | July 19, 2015 | Haleakala | Pan-STARRS 1 | · | 1.1 km | MPC · JPL |
| 803498 | 2015 OC_{148} | — | July 19, 2015 | Haleakala | Pan-STARRS 1 | · | 2.5 km | MPC · JPL |
| 803499 | 2015 OR_{148} | — | July 19, 2015 | Haleakala | Pan-STARRS 1 | KOR | 1.1 km | MPC · JPL |
| 803500 | 2015 OA_{150} | — | July 24, 2015 | Haleakala | Pan-STARRS 1 | · | 2.2 km | MPC · JPL |

== 803501–803600 ==
back to top

| Designation | | | Discovery | | | Properties | | Ref |
| Permanent | Provisional | Named after | Date | Site | Discoverer(s) | Category | Diam. | Ref |
|---|---|---|---|---|---|---|---|---|
| 803501 | 2015 OZ_{150} | — | July 25, 2015 | Haleakala | Pan-STARRS 1 | GEF | 850 m | MPC · JPL |
| 803502 | 2015 OT_{152} | — | July 24, 2015 | Haleakala | Pan-STARRS 1 | VER | 1.9 km | MPC · JPL |
| 803503 | 2015 OC_{153} | — | July 24, 2015 | Haleakala | Pan-STARRS 1 | · | 1.8 km | MPC · JPL |
| 803504 | 2015 OJ_{153} | — | July 23, 2015 | Haleakala | Pan-STARRS 1 | · | 2.1 km | MPC · JPL |
| 803505 | 2015 OK_{153} | — | July 23, 2015 | Haleakala | Pan-STARRS 1 | LUT | 3.0 km | MPC · JPL |
| 803506 | 2015 OX_{153} | — | July 25, 2015 | Haleakala | Pan-STARRS 1 | THB | 2.8 km | MPC · JPL |
| 803507 | 2015 OB_{155} | — | July 24, 2015 | Haleakala | Pan-STARRS 1 | VER | 1.9 km | MPC · JPL |
| 803508 | 2015 OG_{155} | — | July 25, 2015 | Haleakala | Pan-STARRS 1 | URS | 2.1 km | MPC · JPL |
| 803509 | 2015 OO_{156} | — | July 24, 2015 | Haleakala | Pan-STARRS 1 | · | 1.8 km | MPC · JPL |
| 803510 | 2015 OX_{156} | — | July 25, 2015 | Haleakala | Pan-STARRS 1 | · | 2.1 km | MPC · JPL |
| 803511 | 2015 OA_{157} | — | July 24, 2015 | Haleakala | Pan-STARRS 1 | · | 1.5 km | MPC · JPL |
| 803512 | 2015 OO_{158} | — | July 23, 2015 | Haleakala | Pan-STARRS 1 | · | 2.2 km | MPC · JPL |
| 803513 | 2015 OC_{160} | — | July 18, 2015 | Haleakala | Pan-STARRS 1 | EOS | 1.6 km | MPC · JPL |
| 803514 | 2015 OG_{161} | — | July 25, 2015 | Haleakala | Pan-STARRS 1 | · | 1.3 km | MPC · JPL |
| 803515 | 2015 OO_{162} | — | July 19, 2015 | Haleakala | Pan-STARRS 1 | · | 2.4 km | MPC · JPL |
| 803516 | 2015 OF_{164} | — | July 19, 2015 | Haleakala | Pan-STARRS 1 | · | 1.3 km | MPC · JPL |
| 803517 | 2015 OJ_{164} | — | July 23, 2015 | Haleakala | Pan-STARRS 1 | · | 1.2 km | MPC · JPL |
| 803518 | 2015 OP_{164} | — | July 27, 2015 | Haleakala | Pan-STARRS 1 | · | 890 m | MPC · JPL |
| 803519 | 2015 OS_{165} | — | July 24, 2015 | Haleakala | Pan-STARRS 1 | EUN | 790 m | MPC · JPL |
| 803520 | 2015 OB_{166} | — | July 19, 2015 | Haleakala | Pan-STARRS 1 | HNS | 760 m | MPC · JPL |
| 803521 | 2015 OJ_{167} | — | July 25, 2015 | Haleakala | Pan-STARRS 1 | · | 2.7 km | MPC · JPL |
| 803522 | 2015 OA_{168} | — | July 19, 2015 | Haleakala | Pan-STARRS 1 | EOS | 1.1 km | MPC · JPL |
| 803523 | 2015 OV_{169} | — | July 25, 2015 | Haleakala | Pan-STARRS 1 | · | 1.7 km | MPC · JPL |
| 803524 | 2015 OD_{179} | — | December 30, 2008 | Kitt Peak | Spacewatch | · | 1.2 km | MPC · JPL |
| 803525 | 2015 OX_{180} | — | July 19, 2015 | Haleakala | Pan-STARRS 1 | · | 1.1 km | MPC · JPL |
| 803526 | 2015 OM_{181} | — | July 24, 2015 | Haleakala | Pan-STARRS 1 | · | 810 m | MPC · JPL |
| 803527 | 2015 OF_{184} | — | July 24, 2015 | Haleakala | Pan-STARRS 1 | · | 1.4 km | MPC · JPL |
| 803528 | 2015 OB_{191} | — | July 19, 2015 | Haleakala | Pan-STARRS 1 | · | 2.2 km | MPC · JPL |
| 803529 | 2015 PE_{7} | — | June 3, 2011 | Mount Lemmon | Mount Lemmon Survey | · | 1.1 km | MPC · JPL |
| 803530 | 2015 PJ_{8} | — | July 26, 2015 | Haleakala | Pan-STARRS 2 | · | 2.6 km | MPC · JPL |
| 803531 | 2015 PM_{8} | — | November 2, 2010 | Mount Lemmon | Mount Lemmon Survey | · | 1.8 km | MPC · JPL |
| 803532 | 2015 PG_{10} | — | October 20, 2006 | Palomar Mountain | NEAT | · | 1.4 km | MPC · JPL |
| 803533 | 2015 PP_{10} | — | July 19, 2015 | Haleakala | Pan-STARRS 1 | TEL | 880 m | MPC · JPL |
| 803534 | 2015 PS_{10} | — | October 24, 2011 | Haleakala | Pan-STARRS 1 | · | 1.3 km | MPC · JPL |
| 803535 | 2015 PE_{11} | — | October 14, 2007 | Mount Lemmon | Mount Lemmon Survey | (5) | 710 m | MPC · JPL |
| 803536 | 2015 PE_{12} | — | August 7, 2015 | Haleakala | Pan-STARRS 1 | VER | 2.2 km | MPC · JPL |
| 803537 | 2015 PT_{12} | — | June 17, 2015 | Haleakala | Pan-STARRS 1 | · | 2.2 km | MPC · JPL |
| 803538 | 2015 PJ_{14} | — | August 8, 2015 | Haleakala | Pan-STARRS 1 | · | 1.3 km | MPC · JPL |
| 803539 | 2015 PA_{18} | — | June 26, 2015 | Haleakala | Pan-STARRS 1 | · | 2.2 km | MPC · JPL |
| 803540 | 2015 PA_{19} | — | July 27, 2015 | Haleakala | Pan-STARRS 1 | · | 620 m | MPC · JPL |
| 803541 | 2015 PT_{19} | — | August 8, 2015 | Haleakala | Pan-STARRS 1 | · | 1.8 km | MPC · JPL |
| 803542 | 2015 PY_{19} | — | March 26, 2014 | Mount Lemmon | Mount Lemmon Survey | · | 1.7 km | MPC · JPL |
| 803543 | 2015 PM_{21} | — | July 24, 2015 | Haleakala | Pan-STARRS 1 | · | 1.3 km | MPC · JPL |
| 803544 | 2015 PW_{24} | — | August 8, 2015 | Haleakala | Pan-STARRS 1 | · | 1.3 km | MPC · JPL |
| 803545 | 2015 PV_{26} | — | June 26, 2015 | Haleakala | Pan-STARRS 1 | · | 1.8 km | MPC · JPL |
| 803546 | 2015 PN_{28} | — | February 26, 2014 | Haleakala | Pan-STARRS 1 | · | 1.9 km | MPC · JPL |
| 803547 | 2015 PF_{29} | — | June 24, 2015 | Haleakala | Pan-STARRS 2 | · | 1.4 km | MPC · JPL |
| 803548 | 2015 PQ_{31} | — | June 27, 2011 | Mount Lemmon | Mount Lemmon Survey | · | 930 m | MPC · JPL |
| 803549 | 2015 PX_{38} | — | October 29, 2010 | Mount Lemmon | Mount Lemmon Survey | · | 2.0 km | MPC · JPL |
| 803550 | 2015 PB_{40} | — | August 9, 2015 | Haleakala | Pan-STARRS 1 | EUN | 940 m | MPC · JPL |
| 803551 | 2015 PM_{48} | — | July 24, 2015 | Haleakala | Pan-STARRS 1 | · | 1.8 km | MPC · JPL |
| 803552 | 2015 PK_{50} | — | July 24, 2015 | Haleakala | Pan-STARRS 1 | H | 380 m | MPC · JPL |
| 803553 | 2015 PF_{61} | — | July 14, 2015 | Haleakala | Pan-STARRS 1 | H | 420 m | MPC · JPL |
| 803554 | 2015 PP_{61} | — | April 30, 2014 | Haleakala | Pan-STARRS 1 | · | 2.6 km | MPC · JPL |
| 803555 | 2015 PW_{61} | — | April 2, 2003 | Cerro Tololo | Deep Lens Survey | · | 2.0 km | MPC · JPL |
| 803556 | 2015 PN_{64} | — | July 14, 2015 | Haleakala | Pan-STARRS 1 | · | 1.6 km | MPC · JPL |
| 803557 | 2015 PP_{64} | — | June 26, 2015 | Haleakala | Pan-STARRS 1 | · | 1.0 km | MPC · JPL |
| 803558 | 2015 PS_{65} | — | June 18, 2015 | Haleakala | Pan-STARRS 1 | · | 2.1 km | MPC · JPL |
| 803559 | 2015 PT_{65} | — | February 2, 2008 | Mount Lemmon | Mount Lemmon Survey | · | 1.6 km | MPC · JPL |
| 803560 | 2015 PY_{65} | — | June 26, 2015 | Haleakala | Pan-STARRS 1 | · | 1.4 km | MPC · JPL |
| 803561 | 2015 PC_{66} | — | June 26, 2015 | Haleakala | Pan-STARRS 1 | · | 1.0 km | MPC · JPL |
| 803562 | 2015 PT_{67} | — | June 26, 2015 | Haleakala | Pan-STARRS 1 | · | 2.1 km | MPC · JPL |
| 803563 | 2015 PV_{67} | — | October 26, 2008 | Mount Lemmon | Mount Lemmon Survey | V | 590 m | MPC · JPL |
| 803564 | 2015 PH_{69} | — | June 26, 2015 | Haleakala | Pan-STARRS 1 | THM | 1.7 km | MPC · JPL |
| 803565 | 2015 PQ_{72} | — | June 18, 2015 | Haleakala | Pan-STARRS 1 | · | 950 m | MPC · JPL |
| 803566 | 2015 PA_{74} | — | August 10, 2015 | Haleakala | Pan-STARRS 1 | 3:2 | 3.6 km | MPC · JPL |
| 803567 | 2015 PB_{76} | — | August 10, 2015 | Haleakala | Pan-STARRS 1 | · | 1.1 km | MPC · JPL |
| 803568 | 2015 PN_{76} | — | February 5, 2013 | Mount Lemmon | Mount Lemmon Survey | · | 2.3 km | MPC · JPL |
| 803569 | 2015 PY_{78} | — | April 30, 2006 | Kitt Peak | Spacewatch | 3:2 · SHU | 3.7 km | MPC · JPL |
| 803570 | 2015 PB_{81} | — | July 27, 2015 | Haleakala | Pan-STARRS 1 | · | 1.4 km | MPC · JPL |
| 803571 | 2015 PH_{82} | — | April 5, 2014 | Haleakala | Pan-STARRS 1 | · | 2.0 km | MPC · JPL |
| 803572 | 2015 PV_{84} | — | July 15, 2010 | WISE | WISE | · | 2.4 km | MPC · JPL |
| 803573 | 2015 PW_{86} | — | June 26, 2015 | Haleakala | Pan-STARRS 1 | THM | 1.3 km | MPC · JPL |
| 803574 | 2015 PH_{93} | — | July 25, 2015 | Haleakala | Pan-STARRS 1 | · | 810 m | MPC · JPL |
| 803575 | 2015 PM_{94} | — | August 10, 2015 | Haleakala | Pan-STARRS 1 | PAD | 1.1 km | MPC · JPL |
| 803576 | 2015 PF_{95} | — | September 27, 2003 | Kitt Peak | Spacewatch | · | 690 m | MPC · JPL |
| 803577 | 2015 PW_{95} | — | July 27, 2015 | Haleakala | Pan-STARRS 1 | EUP | 2.3 km | MPC · JPL |
| 803578 | 2015 PL_{96} | — | August 10, 2015 | Haleakala | Pan-STARRS 1 | · | 2.1 km | MPC · JPL |
| 803579 | 2015 PP_{103} | — | July 25, 2015 | Haleakala | Pan-STARRS 1 | VER | 1.9 km | MPC · JPL |
| 803580 | 2015 PE_{107} | — | August 10, 2015 | Haleakala | Pan-STARRS 1 | · | 2.3 km | MPC · JPL |
| 803581 | 2015 PG_{112} | — | August 10, 2015 | Haleakala | Pan-STARRS 1 | · | 2.3 km | MPC · JPL |
| 803582 | 2015 PP_{112} | — | April 29, 2014 | Haleakala | Pan-STARRS 1 | · | 2.3 km | MPC · JPL |
| 803583 | 2015 PO_{118} | — | August 10, 2015 | Haleakala | Pan-STARRS 1 | · | 2.1 km | MPC · JPL |
| 803584 | 2015 PC_{119} | — | July 18, 2015 | Haleakala | Pan-STARRS 1 | URS | 2.1 km | MPC · JPL |
| 803585 | 2015 PJ_{120} | — | July 25, 2015 | Haleakala | Pan-STARRS 1 | T_{j} (2.98) | 2.2 km | MPC · JPL |
| 803586 | 2015 PA_{121} | — | August 10, 2015 | Haleakala | Pan-STARRS 1 | · | 2.3 km | MPC · JPL |
| 803587 | 2015 PE_{123} | — | August 10, 2015 | Haleakala | Pan-STARRS 1 | THM | 1.7 km | MPC · JPL |
| 803588 | 2015 PH_{123} | — | January 28, 2004 | Sacramento Peak | SDSS | PHO | 740 m | MPC · JPL |
| 803589 | 2015 PP_{124} | — | July 25, 2015 | Haleakala | Pan-STARRS 1 | · | 2.3 km | MPC · JPL |
| 803590 | 2015 PP_{126} | — | September 20, 2011 | Mount Lemmon | Mount Lemmon Survey | · | 1.1 km | MPC · JPL |
| 803591 | 2015 PB_{130} | — | March 28, 2014 | Mount Lemmon | Mount Lemmon Survey | · | 2.0 km | MPC · JPL |
| 803592 | 2015 PE_{136} | — | April 4, 2014 | Haleakala | Pan-STARRS 1 | · | 1.3 km | MPC · JPL |
| 803593 | 2015 PS_{136} | — | April 8, 2014 | Mount Lemmon | Mount Lemmon Survey | · | 2.5 km | MPC · JPL |
| 803594 | 2015 PG_{139} | — | May 17, 2009 | Mount Lemmon | Mount Lemmon Survey | · | 1.8 km | MPC · JPL |
| 803595 | 2015 PF_{143} | — | July 18, 2015 | Haleakala | Pan-STARRS 1 | EOS | 1.5 km | MPC · JPL |
| 803596 | 2015 PC_{144} | — | July 18, 2015 | Haleakala | Pan-STARRS 1 | · | 2.3 km | MPC · JPL |
| 803597 | 2015 PN_{148} | — | August 10, 2015 | Haleakala | Pan-STARRS 1 | · | 2.2 km | MPC · JPL |
| 803598 | 2015 PT_{151} | — | August 10, 2015 | Haleakala | Pan-STARRS 1 | AST | 1.4 km | MPC · JPL |
| 803599 | 2015 PN_{163} | — | March 24, 2014 | Haleakala | Pan-STARRS 1 | · | 1.1 km | MPC · JPL |
| 803600 | 2015 PA_{169} | — | February 10, 2014 | Haleakala | Pan-STARRS 1 | · | 1.8 km | MPC · JPL |

== 803601–803700 ==
back to top

| Designation | | | Discovery | | | Properties | | Ref |
| Permanent | Provisional | Named after | Date | Site | Discoverer(s) | Category | Diam. | Ref |
|---|---|---|---|---|---|---|---|---|
| 803601 | 2015 PY_{169} | — | July 18, 2015 | Haleakala | Pan-STARRS 1 | PHO | 720 m | MPC · JPL |
| 803602 | 2015 PS_{171} | — | August 10, 2015 | Haleakala | Pan-STARRS 1 | · | 1.6 km | MPC · JPL |
| 803603 | 2015 PF_{172} | — | July 25, 2015 | Haleakala | Pan-STARRS 1 | · | 2.0 km | MPC · JPL |
| 803604 | 2015 PW_{174} | — | July 24, 2015 | Haleakala | Pan-STARRS 1 | · | 780 m | MPC · JPL |
| 803605 | 2015 PD_{175} | — | July 24, 2015 | Haleakala | Pan-STARRS 1 | · | 2.0 km | MPC · JPL |
| 803606 | 2015 PW_{177} | — | July 24, 2015 | Haleakala | Pan-STARRS 1 | · | 1.2 km | MPC · JPL |
| 803607 | 2015 PO_{178} | — | July 24, 2015 | Haleakala | Pan-STARRS 1 | · | 2.0 km | MPC · JPL |
| 803608 | 2015 PN_{183} | — | April 14, 2007 | Kitt Peak | Spacewatch | NYS | 990 m | MPC · JPL |
| 803609 | 2015 PB_{186} | — | April 30, 2014 | Haleakala | Pan-STARRS 1 | · | 2.4 km | MPC · JPL |
| 803610 | 2015 PB_{188} | — | August 10, 2015 | Haleakala | Pan-STARRS 1 | · | 1.1 km | MPC · JPL |
| 803611 | 2015 PO_{189} | — | February 1, 2012 | Mount Lemmon | Mount Lemmon Survey | · | 2.1 km | MPC · JPL |
| 803612 | 2015 PL_{190} | — | October 21, 2006 | Mount Lemmon | Mount Lemmon Survey | · | 1.4 km | MPC · JPL |
| 803613 | 2015 PM_{191} | — | May 4, 2014 | Haleakala | Pan-STARRS 1 | · | 2.2 km | MPC · JPL |
| 803614 | 2015 PC_{196} | — | July 24, 2015 | Haleakala | Pan-STARRS 1 | · | 1.1 km | MPC · JPL |
| 803615 | 2015 PJ_{201} | — | July 24, 2015 | Haleakala | Pan-STARRS 1 | H | 390 m | MPC · JPL |
| 803616 | 2015 PZ_{204} | — | October 19, 2006 | Kitt Peak | Deep Ecliptic Survey | · | 1.1 km | MPC · JPL |
| 803617 | 2015 PB_{209} | — | November 3, 2010 | Mount Lemmon | Mount Lemmon Survey | · | 2.5 km | MPC · JPL |
| 803618 | 2015 PH_{209} | — | April 6, 2014 | Mount Lemmon | Mount Lemmon Survey | THB | 2.2 km | MPC · JPL |
| 803619 | 2015 PY_{210} | — | August 10, 2015 | Haleakala | Pan-STARRS 1 | · | 3.2 km | MPC · JPL |
| 803620 | 2015 PK_{211} | — | April 23, 2014 | Kitt Peak | Spacewatch | · | 2.9 km | MPC · JPL |
| 803621 | 2015 PO_{211} | — | August 10, 2015 | Haleakala | Pan-STARRS 1 | · | 2.6 km | MPC · JPL |
| 803622 | 2015 PT_{213} | — | August 10, 2015 | Haleakala | Pan-STARRS 1 | EUN | 840 m | MPC · JPL |
| 803623 | 2015 PC_{214} | — | October 23, 2011 | Haleakala | Pan-STARRS 1 | · | 890 m | MPC · JPL |
| 803624 | 2015 PX_{214} | — | September 18, 2010 | Kitt Peak | Spacewatch | · | 1.7 km | MPC · JPL |
| 803625 | 2015 PA_{216} | — | September 30, 2010 | Mount Lemmon | Mount Lemmon Survey | · | 2.3 km | MPC · JPL |
| 803626 | 2015 PZ_{219} | — | May 7, 2014 | Haleakala | Pan-STARRS 1 | URS | 2.0 km | MPC · JPL |
| 803627 | 2015 PC_{220} | — | May 21, 2014 | Haleakala | Pan-STARRS 1 | · | 1.9 km | MPC · JPL |
| 803628 | 2015 PZ_{220} | — | May 21, 2014 | Haleakala | Pan-STARRS 1 | · | 2.5 km | MPC · JPL |
| 803629 | 2015 PM_{222} | — | August 10, 2015 | Haleakala | Pan-STARRS 1 | · | 2.4 km | MPC · JPL |
| 803630 | 2015 PU_{222} | — | November 2, 2010 | Mount Lemmon | Mount Lemmon Survey | · | 2.6 km | MPC · JPL |
| 803631 | 2015 PO_{226} | — | July 28, 2015 | Haleakala | Pan-STARRS 1 | · | 2.2 km | MPC · JPL |
| 803632 | 2015 PK_{228} | — | February 5, 2009 | Mount Lemmon | Mount Lemmon Survey | H | 440 m | MPC · JPL |
| 803633 | 2015 PA_{231} | — | March 24, 2014 | Haleakala | Pan-STARRS 1 | · | 1.0 km | MPC · JPL |
| 803634 | 2015 PO_{232} | — | June 26, 2015 | Haleakala | Pan-STARRS 1 | · | 1.7 km | MPC · JPL |
| 803635 | 2015 PL_{235} | — | June 26, 2015 | Haleakala | Pan-STARRS 1 | · | 1.6 km | MPC · JPL |
| 803636 | 2015 PT_{237} | — | July 18, 2015 | Haleakala | Pan-STARRS 1 | VER | 2.0 km | MPC · JPL |
| 803637 | 2015 PT_{238} | — | August 10, 2015 | Haleakala | Pan-STARRS 1 | · | 1.4 km | MPC · JPL |
| 803638 | 2015 PF_{240} | — | August 10, 2015 | Haleakala | Pan-STARRS 1 | · | 1.4 km | MPC · JPL |
| 803639 | 2015 PQ_{241} | — | August 10, 2015 | Haleakala | Pan-STARRS 1 | · | 2.2 km | MPC · JPL |
| 803640 | 2015 PD_{244} | — | August 10, 2015 | Haleakala | Pan-STARRS 1 | · | 1.1 km | MPC · JPL |
| 803641 | 2015 PK_{244} | — | August 10, 2015 | Haleakala | Pan-STARRS 1 | THB | 1.8 km | MPC · JPL |
| 803642 | 2015 PX_{249} | — | October 14, 2010 | Mount Lemmon | Mount Lemmon Survey | · | 2.0 km | MPC · JPL |
| 803643 | 2015 PZ_{249} | — | August 10, 2015 | Haleakala | Pan-STARRS 1 | · | 2.1 km | MPC · JPL |
| 803644 | 2015 PN_{250} | — | May 6, 2014 | Haleakala | Pan-STARRS 1 | · | 2.5 km | MPC · JPL |
| 803645 | 2015 PA_{252} | — | October 1, 2003 | Kitt Peak | Spacewatch | · | 780 m | MPC · JPL |
| 803646 | 2015 PR_{253} | — | August 10, 2015 | Haleakala | Pan-STARRS 1 | · | 2.7 km | MPC · JPL |
| 803647 | 2015 PF_{264} | — | September 11, 2007 | Mount Lemmon | Mount Lemmon Survey | · | 830 m | MPC · JPL |
| 803648 | 2015 PF_{265} | — | February 26, 2008 | Mount Lemmon | Mount Lemmon Survey | · | 2.0 km | MPC · JPL |
| 803649 | 2015 PH_{266} | — | July 18, 2015 | Haleakala | Pan-STARRS 1 | EOS | 1.3 km | MPC · JPL |
| 803650 | 2015 PF_{268} | — | August 10, 2015 | Haleakala | Pan-STARRS 1 | · | 2.1 km | MPC · JPL |
| 803651 | 2015 PA_{269} | — | June 17, 2015 | Haleakala | Pan-STARRS 1 | · | 2.2 km | MPC · JPL |
| 803652 | 2015 PF_{275} | — | October 10, 2010 | Kitt Peak | Spacewatch | · | 2.2 km | MPC · JPL |
| 803653 | 2015 PZ_{283} | — | August 12, 2015 | Haleakala | Pan-STARRS 1 | · | 1.4 km | MPC · JPL |
| 803654 | 2015 PT_{284} | — | July 24, 2015 | Haleakala | Pan-STARRS 1 | · | 2.1 km | MPC · JPL |
| 803655 | 2015 PX_{289} | — | August 12, 2015 | Haleakala | Pan-STARRS 1 | · | 2.4 km | MPC · JPL |
| 803656 | 2015 PA_{291} | — | August 12, 2015 | Haleakala | Pan-STARRS 1 | · | 840 m | MPC · JPL |
| 803657 | 2015 PD_{292} | — | February 28, 2014 | Haleakala | Pan-STARRS 1 | · | 1.9 km | MPC · JPL |
| 803658 | 2015 PO_{300} | — | April 6, 2002 | Cerro Tololo | Deep Ecliptic Survey | MAS | 660 m | MPC · JPL |
| 803659 | 2015 PC_{312} | — | July 18, 2015 | Haleakala | Pan-STARRS 1 | H | 410 m | MPC · JPL |
| 803660 | 2015 PT_{313} | — | August 12, 2015 | Haleakala | Pan-STARRS 1 | 526 | 1.8 km | MPC · JPL |
| 803661 | 2015 PY_{313} | — | August 13, 2015 | XuYi | PMO NEO Survey Program | TIR | 2.1 km | MPC · JPL |
| 803662 | 2015 PP_{317} | — | April 8, 2014 | Mount Lemmon | Mount Lemmon Survey | · | 1.9 km | MPC · JPL |
| 803663 | 2015 PO_{318} | — | August 9, 2015 | Haleakala | Pan-STARRS 1 | · | 1.1 km | MPC · JPL |
| 803664 | 2015 PE_{319} | — | August 9, 2015 | Haleakala | Pan-STARRS 1 | · | 2.3 km | MPC · JPL |
| 803665 | 2015 PE_{321} | — | May 27, 2014 | Haleakala | Pan-STARRS 1 | · | 970 m | MPC · JPL |
| 803666 | 2015 PP_{323} | — | August 12, 2015 | Haleakala | Pan-STARRS 1 | · | 2.8 km | MPC · JPL |
| 803667 | 2015 PD_{325} | — | August 9, 2015 | Haleakala | Pan-STARRS 1 | EOS | 1.1 km | MPC · JPL |
| 803668 | 2015 PY_{325} | — | August 9, 2015 | Haleakala | Pan-STARRS 1 | V | 530 m | MPC · JPL |
| 803669 | 2015 PC_{327} | — | March 12, 2002 | Kitt Peak | Spacewatch | EUP | 2.6 km | MPC · JPL |
| 803670 | 2015 PB_{331} | — | August 14, 2015 | Haleakala | Pan-STARRS 1 | EUN | 870 m | MPC · JPL |
| 803671 | 2015 PG_{331} | — | August 14, 2015 | Haleakala | Pan-STARRS 1 | · | 700 m | MPC · JPL |
| 803672 | 2015 PL_{331} | — | August 9, 2015 | Haleakala | Pan-STARRS 1 | · | 1.2 km | MPC · JPL |
| 803673 | 2015 PU_{331} | — | August 9, 2015 | Haleakala | Pan-STARRS 1 | · | 1.1 km | MPC · JPL |
| 803674 | 2015 PK_{332} | — | August 12, 2015 | Haleakala | Pan-STARRS 1 | EOS | 1.5 km | MPC · JPL |
| 803675 | 2015 PR_{332} | — | August 10, 2015 | Haleakala | Pan-STARRS 2 | · | 870 m | MPC · JPL |
| 803676 | 2015 PF_{333} | — | August 10, 2015 | Haleakala | Pan-STARRS 1 | EUP | 2.0 km | MPC · JPL |
| 803677 | 2015 PA_{335} | — | August 14, 2015 | Haleakala | Pan-STARRS 1 | · | 2.6 km | MPC · JPL |
| 803678 | 2015 PO_{340} | — | August 14, 2015 | Haleakala | Pan-STARRS 1 | · | 1.1 km | MPC · JPL |
| 803679 | 2015 PM_{345} | — | August 9, 2015 | Haleakala | Pan-STARRS 1 | · | 1.7 km | MPC · JPL |
| 803680 | 2015 PV_{345} | — | August 12, 2015 | Haleakala | Pan-STARRS 1 | · | 980 m | MPC · JPL |
| 803681 | 2015 PN_{346} | — | August 13, 2015 | Kitt Peak | Spacewatch | VER | 1.9 km | MPC · JPL |
| 803682 | 2015 PG_{348} | — | August 12, 2015 | Haleakala | Pan-STARRS 1 | VER | 1.7 km | MPC · JPL |
| 803683 | 2015 PR_{348} | — | August 11, 2015 | Haleakala | Pan-STARRS 1 | · | 2.0 km | MPC · JPL |
| 803684 | 2015 PW_{349} | — | August 3, 2015 | Haleakala | Pan-STARRS 1 | · | 1.9 km | MPC · JPL |
| 803685 | 2015 PG_{351} | — | August 10, 2015 | Haleakala | Pan-STARRS 1 | · | 1.8 km | MPC · JPL |
| 803686 | 2015 PV_{359} | — | August 10, 2015 | Haleakala | Pan-STARRS 1 | · | 2.0 km | MPC · JPL |
| 803687 | 2015 PT_{363} | — | August 10, 2015 | Haleakala | Pan-STARRS 1 | KOR | 900 m | MPC · JPL |
| 803688 | 2015 QZ_{2} | — | January 17, 2013 | Haleakala | Pan-STARRS 1 | · | 1.1 km | MPC · JPL |
| 803689 | 2015 QT_{6} | — | July 23, 2015 | Haleakala | Pan-STARRS 1 | URS | 2.4 km | MPC · JPL |
| 803690 | 2015 QP_{7} | — | June 21, 2015 | Haleakala | Pan-STARRS 1 | · | 760 m | MPC · JPL |
| 803691 | 2015 QB_{11} | — | August 14, 2015 | Haleakala | Pan-STARRS 1 | · | 1.7 km | MPC · JPL |
| 803692 | 2015 QR_{15} | — | August 20, 2015 | Kitt Peak | Spacewatch | · | 1.9 km | MPC · JPL |
| 803693 | 2015 QW_{15} | — | August 20, 2015 | Kitt Peak | Spacewatch | EUN | 850 m | MPC · JPL |
| 803694 | 2015 QU_{17} | — | May 7, 2013 | Mount Lemmon | Mount Lemmon Survey | · | 2.0 km | MPC · JPL |
| 803695 | 2015 QG_{22} | — | February 20, 2002 | Kitt Peak | Spacewatch | EUP | 2.4 km | MPC · JPL |
| 803696 | 2015 QU_{24} | — | August 21, 2015 | Haleakala | Pan-STARRS 1 | VER | 1.8 km | MPC · JPL |
| 803697 | 2015 QW_{24} | — | March 29, 2008 | Catalina | CSS | THB | 2.5 km | MPC · JPL |
| 803698 | 2015 QK_{25} | — | August 21, 2015 | Haleakala | Pan-STARRS 1 | · | 2.1 km | MPC · JPL |
| 803699 | 2015 QM_{25} | — | May 7, 2014 | Haleakala | Pan-STARRS 1 | · | 1.7 km | MPC · JPL |
| 803700 | 2015 QP_{25} | — | June 25, 2015 | Haleakala | Pan-STARRS 1 | · | 2.0 km | MPC · JPL |

== 803701–803800 ==
back to top

| Designation | | | Discovery | | | Properties | | Ref |
| Permanent | Provisional | Named after | Date | Site | Discoverer(s) | Category | Diam. | Ref |
|---|---|---|---|---|---|---|---|---|
| 803701 | 2015 QZ_{26} | — | August 21, 2015 | Haleakala | Pan-STARRS 1 | · | 1.1 km | MPC · JPL |
| 803702 | 2015 QK_{28} | — | August 21, 2015 | Haleakala | Pan-STARRS 1 | · | 1.3 km | MPC · JPL |
| 803703 | 2015 QM_{29} | — | August 21, 2015 | Haleakala | Pan-STARRS 1 | · | 1.0 km | MPC · JPL |
| 803704 | 2015 QY_{29} | — | August 21, 2015 | Haleakala | Pan-STARRS 1 | AGN | 790 m | MPC · JPL |
| 803705 | 2015 QR_{31} | — | August 21, 2015 | Haleakala | Pan-STARRS 1 | · | 1.6 km | MPC · JPL |
| 803706 | 2015 QH_{32} | — | August 21, 2015 | Haleakala | Pan-STARRS 1 | EUN | 640 m | MPC · JPL |
| 803707 | 2015 QA_{33} | — | August 21, 2015 | Haleakala | Pan-STARRS 1 | · | 2.0 km | MPC · JPL |
| 803708 | 2015 QH_{33} | — | August 21, 2015 | Haleakala | Pan-STARRS 1 | · | 2.6 km | MPC · JPL |
| 803709 | 2015 QR_{38} | — | November 1, 2010 | Mount Lemmon | Mount Lemmon Survey | · | 1.9 km | MPC · JPL |
| 803710 | 2015 QF_{41} | — | August 21, 2015 | Haleakala | Pan-STARRS 1 | EOS | 1.2 km | MPC · JPL |
| 803711 | 2015 RQ_{1} | — | October 2, 2008 | Mount Lemmon | Mount Lemmon Survey | · | 870 m | MPC · JPL |
| 803712 | 2015 RA_{6} | — | July 19, 2015 | Haleakala | Pan-STARRS 2 | PHO | 810 m | MPC · JPL |
| 803713 | 2015 RS_{7} | — | August 10, 2015 | Haleakala | Pan-STARRS 1 | · | 2.2 km | MPC · JPL |
| 803714 | 2015 RK_{13} | — | April 4, 2014 | Haleakala | Pan-STARRS 1 | · | 2.0 km | MPC · JPL |
| 803715 | 2015 RD_{19} | — | July 30, 2015 | Haleakala | Pan-STARRS 1 | · | 1.2 km | MPC · JPL |
| 803716 | 2015 RH_{30} | — | September 8, 2015 | XuYi | PMO NEO Survey Program | H | 510 m | MPC · JPL |
| 803717 | 2015 RW_{33} | — | December 2, 2010 | Mount Lemmon | Mount Lemmon Survey | LUT | 2.9 km | MPC · JPL |
| 803718 | 2015 RM_{34} | — | September 9, 2015 | Haleakala | Pan-STARRS 1 | TIR | 2.0 km | MPC · JPL |
| 803719 | 2015 RO_{46} | — | September 10, 2015 | Haleakala | Pan-STARRS 1 | ELF | 2.1 km | MPC · JPL |
| 803720 | 2015 RT_{46} | — | April 17, 2013 | Cerro Tololo-DECam | DECam | · | 1.5 km | MPC · JPL |
| 803721 | 2015 RG_{48} | — | June 24, 2015 | Haleakala | Pan-STARRS 1 | · | 2.6 km | MPC · JPL |
| 803722 | 2015 RM_{55} | — | August 31, 2011 | Haleakala | Pan-STARRS 1 | · | 820 m | MPC · JPL |
| 803723 | 2015 RW_{59} | — | July 23, 2015 | Haleakala | Pan-STARRS 1 | · | 1.1 km | MPC · JPL |
| 803724 | 2015 RG_{60} | — | September 10, 2015 | Haleakala | Pan-STARRS 1 | · | 2.6 km | MPC · JPL |
| 803725 | 2015 RV_{61} | — | October 14, 2010 | Mount Lemmon | Mount Lemmon Survey | · | 1.5 km | MPC · JPL |
| 803726 | 2015 RJ_{65} | — | September 23, 2011 | Mount Lemmon | Mount Lemmon Survey | · | 650 m | MPC · JPL |
| 803727 | 2015 RK_{69} | — | March 28, 2014 | Haleakala | Pan-STARRS 1 | · | 1.8 km | MPC · JPL |
| 803728 | 2015 RG_{71} | — | June 26, 2015 | Haleakala | Pan-STARRS 1 | · | 1.7 km | MPC · JPL |
| 803729 | 2015 RM_{71} | — | August 12, 2015 | Haleakala | Pan-STARRS 1 | · | 2.2 km | MPC · JPL |
| 803730 | 2015 RW_{74} | — | October 4, 2004 | Kitt Peak | Spacewatch | THM | 1.6 km | MPC · JPL |
| 803731 | 2015 RW_{77} | — | September 10, 2015 | Haleakala | Pan-STARRS 1 | · | 700 m | MPC · JPL |
| 803732 | 2015 RW_{78} | — | September 10, 2015 | Haleakala | Pan-STARRS 1 | EUN | 730 m | MPC · JPL |
| 803733 | 2015 RA_{79} | — | December 22, 2008 | Mount Lemmon | Mount Lemmon Survey | · | 930 m | MPC · JPL |
| 803734 | 2015 RO_{87} | — | July 23, 2015 | Haleakala | Pan-STARRS 1 | · | 1.6 km | MPC · JPL |
| 803735 | 2015 RV_{88} | — | May 8, 2014 | Haleakala | Pan-STARRS 1 | · | 2.4 km | MPC · JPL |
| 803736 | 2015 RZ_{96} | — | July 25, 2011 | Haleakala | Pan-STARRS 1 | MAS | 580 m | MPC · JPL |
| 803737 | 2015 RH_{102} | — | June 27, 2015 | Haleakala | Pan-STARRS 1 | · | 870 m | MPC · JPL |
| 803738 | 2015 RD_{104} | — | June 2, 2015 | Cerro Tololo-DECam | DECam | · | 590 m | MPC · JPL |
| 803739 | 2015 RL_{106} | — | July 16, 2004 | Socorro | LINEAR | · | 870 m | MPC · JPL |
| 803740 | 2015 RM_{106} | — | July 30, 2015 | Haleakala | Pan-STARRS 1 | · | 1.8 km | MPC · JPL |
| 803741 | 2015 RG_{107} | — | August 12, 2015 | Haleakala | Pan-STARRS 1 | PHO | 770 m | MPC · JPL |
| 803742 | 2015 RR_{110} | — | May 20, 2014 | Haleakala | Pan-STARRS 1 | KOR | 1.1 km | MPC · JPL |
| 803743 | 2015 RH_{111} | — | September 9, 2015 | Haleakala | Pan-STARRS 1 | · | 900 m | MPC · JPL |
| 803744 | 2015 RW_{119} | — | March 15, 2009 | Kitt Peak | Spacewatch | H | 470 m | MPC · JPL |
| 803745 | 2015 RZ_{124} | — | February 15, 2013 | Haleakala | Pan-STARRS 1 | THM | 1.8 km | MPC · JPL |
| 803746 | 2015 RP_{130} | — | September 9, 2015 | Haleakala | Pan-STARRS 1 | · | 2.0 km | MPC · JPL |
| 803747 | 2015 RR_{133} | — | July 25, 2015 | Haleakala | Pan-STARRS 1 | · | 790 m | MPC · JPL |
| 803748 | 2015 RC_{138} | — | September 9, 2015 | Haleakala | Pan-STARRS 1 | · | 1.4 km | MPC · JPL |
| 803749 | 2015 RD_{150} | — | December 30, 2011 | Mount Lemmon | Mount Lemmon Survey | · | 1.1 km | MPC · JPL |
| 803750 | 2015 RY_{151} | — | January 10, 2013 | Haleakala | Pan-STARRS 1 | · | 900 m | MPC · JPL |
| 803751 | 2015 RW_{156} | — | March 8, 2013 | Haleakala | Pan-STARRS 1 | · | 1.4 km | MPC · JPL |
| 803752 | 2015 RC_{157} | — | March 1, 2009 | Kitt Peak | Spacewatch | · | 930 m | MPC · JPL |
| 803753 | 2015 RM_{169} | — | September 9, 2015 | Haleakala | Pan-STARRS 1 | · | 1.2 km | MPC · JPL |
| 803754 | 2015 RU_{171} | — | September 9, 2015 | Haleakala | Pan-STARRS 1 | · | 1.4 km | MPC · JPL |
| 803755 | 2015 RE_{177} | — | October 31, 2010 | Mount Lemmon | Mount Lemmon Survey | · | 2.1 km | MPC · JPL |
| 803756 | 2015 RY_{177} | — | March 16, 2010 | Mount Lemmon | Mount Lemmon Survey | · | 930 m | MPC · JPL |
| 803757 | 2015 RA_{183} | — | October 7, 2007 | Mount Lemmon | Mount Lemmon Survey | · | 550 m | MPC · JPL |
| 803758 | 2015 RP_{183} | — | September 18, 2006 | Kitt Peak | Spacewatch | · | 1.3 km | MPC · JPL |
| 803759 | 2015 RO_{193} | — | May 21, 2014 | Haleakala | Pan-STARRS 1 | · | 680 m | MPC · JPL |
| 803760 | 2015 RR_{195} | — | September 11, 2015 | Haleakala | Pan-STARRS 1 | H | 460 m | MPC · JPL |
| 803761 | 2015 RY_{197} | — | September 11, 2015 | Haleakala | Pan-STARRS 1 | AGN | 820 m | MPC · JPL |
| 803762 | 2015 RM_{199} | — | June 12, 2011 | Mount Lemmon | Mount Lemmon Survey | · | 1.1 km | MPC · JPL |
| 803763 | 2015 RD_{208} | — | February 26, 2014 | Haleakala | Pan-STARRS 1 | · | 970 m | MPC · JPL |
| 803764 | 2015 RZ_{210} | — | June 22, 2015 | Haleakala | Pan-STARRS 1 | · | 2.1 km | MPC · JPL |
| 803765 | 2015 RK_{228} | — | September 11, 2015 | Haleakala | Pan-STARRS 1 | · | 1.9 km | MPC · JPL |
| 803766 | 2015 RD_{229} | — | April 15, 2010 | Mount Lemmon | Mount Lemmon Survey | · | 810 m | MPC · JPL |
| 803767 | 2015 RZ_{230} | — | September 11, 2015 | Haleakala | Pan-STARRS 1 | · | 820 m | MPC · JPL |
| 803768 | 2015 RL_{231} | — | October 23, 2003 | Kitt Peak | Spacewatch | · | 2.3 km | MPC · JPL |
| 803769 | 2015 RR_{231} | — | September 11, 2015 | Haleakala | Pan-STARRS 1 | · | 1.3 km | MPC · JPL |
| 803770 | 2015 RG_{234} | — | September 11, 2015 | Haleakala | Pan-STARRS 1 | · | 1.0 km | MPC · JPL |
| 803771 | 2015 RY_{237} | — | April 25, 2006 | Kitt Peak | Spacewatch | H | 450 m | MPC · JPL |
| 803772 | 2015 RK_{238} | — | April 30, 2014 | Haleakala | Pan-STARRS 1 | · | 910 m | MPC · JPL |
| 803773 | 2015 RN_{241} | — | September 11, 2015 | Haleakala | Pan-STARRS 1 | · | 920 m | MPC · JPL |
| 803774 | 2015 RB_{243} | — | September 11, 2015 | Haleakala | Pan-STARRS 1 | H | 470 m | MPC · JPL |
| 803775 | 2015 RE_{245} | — | September 7, 2015 | Palomar Mountain | Palomar Transient Factory | · | 600 m | MPC · JPL |
| 803776 | 2015 RK_{253} | — | September 11, 2015 | Haleakala | Pan-STARRS 1 | KOR | 1.1 km | MPC · JPL |
| 803777 | 2015 RY_{256} | — | July 25, 2015 | Haleakala | Pan-STARRS 1 | · | 1.9 km | MPC · JPL |
| 803778 | 2015 RJ_{257} | — | September 9, 2015 | Haleakala | Pan-STARRS 1 | · | 940 m | MPC · JPL |
| 803779 | 2015 RH_{261} | — | September 9, 2015 | Haleakala | Pan-STARRS 1 | · | 830 m | MPC · JPL |
| 803780 | 2015 RA_{262} | — | August 9, 2015 | Haleakala | Pan-STARRS 1 | KOR | 1.1 km | MPC · JPL |
| 803781 | 2015 RO_{265} | — | September 9, 2015 | Haleakala | Pan-STARRS 1 | · | 1.5 km | MPC · JPL |
| 803782 | 2015 RX_{265} | — | November 8, 2010 | Kitt Peak | Spacewatch | · | 1.6 km | MPC · JPL |
| 803783 | 2015 RR_{270} | — | April 29, 2014 | Haleakala | Pan-STARRS 1 | · | 1.7 km | MPC · JPL |
| 803784 | 2015 RO_{272} | — | September 11, 2015 | Haleakala | Pan-STARRS 1 | · | 1.1 km | MPC · JPL |
| 803785 | 2015 RJ_{274} | — | October 17, 2010 | Mount Lemmon | Mount Lemmon Survey | · | 1.5 km | MPC · JPL |
| 803786 | 2015 RA_{282} | — | September 11, 2007 | Kitt Peak | Spacewatch | H | 440 m | MPC · JPL |
| 803787 | 2015 RC_{283} | — | September 9, 2015 | Haleakala | Pan-STARRS 1 | · | 780 m | MPC · JPL |
| 803788 | 2015 RA_{285} | — | September 9, 2015 | Haleakala | Pan-STARRS 1 | · | 900 m | MPC · JPL |
| 803789 | 2015 RH_{286} | — | September 12, 2015 | Haleakala | Pan-STARRS 1 | · | 1.0 km | MPC · JPL |
| 803790 | 2015 RL_{289} | — | September 9, 2015 | Haleakala | Pan-STARRS 1 | · | 1.2 km | MPC · JPL |
| 803791 | 2015 RP_{289} | — | September 9, 2015 | Haleakala | Pan-STARRS 1 | · | 1.4 km | MPC · JPL |
| 803792 | 2015 RE_{291} | — | January 27, 2017 | Haleakala | Pan-STARRS 1 | (10369) | 1.1 km | MPC · JPL |
| 803793 | 2015 RS_{294} | — | September 11, 2015 | Haleakala | Pan-STARRS 1 | · | 1.1 km | MPC · JPL |
| 803794 | 2015 RH_{301} | — | September 12, 2015 | Haleakala | Pan-STARRS 1 | · | 1.3 km | MPC · JPL |
| 803795 | 2015 RX_{302} | — | September 11, 2015 | Haleakala | Pan-STARRS 1 | · | 2.2 km | MPC · JPL |
| 803796 | 2015 RD_{304} | — | September 9, 2015 | Haleakala | Pan-STARRS 1 | · | 730 m | MPC · JPL |
| 803797 | 2015 RB_{305} | — | September 9, 2015 | Haleakala | Pan-STARRS 1 | · | 1.9 km | MPC · JPL |
| 803798 | 2015 RX_{305} | — | September 9, 2015 | Haleakala | Pan-STARRS 1 | · | 1.9 km | MPC · JPL |
| 803799 | 2015 RE_{306} | — | September 11, 2015 | Haleakala | Pan-STARRS 1 | MAR | 640 m | MPC · JPL |
| 803800 | 2015 RQ_{306} | — | September 10, 2015 | Haleakala | Pan-STARRS 1 | · | 2.1 km | MPC · JPL |

== 803801–803900 ==
back to top

| Designation | | | Discovery | | | Properties | | Ref |
| Permanent | Provisional | Named after | Date | Site | Discoverer(s) | Category | Diam. | Ref |
|---|---|---|---|---|---|---|---|---|
| 803801 | 2015 RC_{308} | — | September 9, 2015 | Haleakala | Pan-STARRS 1 | · | 1.6 km | MPC · JPL |
| 803802 | 2015 RD_{308} | — | September 9, 2015 | Haleakala | Pan-STARRS 1 | · | 2.5 km | MPC · JPL |
| 803803 | 2015 RG_{310} | — | September 9, 2015 | Haleakala | Pan-STARRS 1 | KOR | 1.1 km | MPC · JPL |
| 803804 | 2015 RL_{310} | — | September 11, 2015 | Haleakala | Pan-STARRS 1 | · | 1.9 km | MPC · JPL |
| 803805 | 2015 RR_{310} | — | September 10, 2015 | Haleakala | Pan-STARRS 1 | · | 1.4 km | MPC · JPL |
| 803806 | 2015 RX_{311} | — | September 10, 2015 | Haleakala | Pan-STARRS 1 | · | 2.5 km | MPC · JPL |
| 803807 | 2015 RR_{315} | — | September 9, 2015 | Haleakala | Pan-STARRS 1 | · | 1.4 km | MPC · JPL |
| 803808 | 2015 RJ_{316} | — | February 9, 2008 | Kitt Peak | Spacewatch | · | 1.3 km | MPC · JPL |
| 803809 | 2015 RO_{316} | — | September 9, 2015 | Haleakala | Pan-STARRS 1 | · | 870 m | MPC · JPL |
| 803810 | 2015 RC_{317} | — | September 10, 2015 | Haleakala | Pan-STARRS 1 | · | 1.7 km | MPC · JPL |
| 803811 | 2015 RX_{317} | — | September 9, 2015 | Haleakala | Pan-STARRS 1 | · | 2.1 km | MPC · JPL |
| 803812 | 2015 RU_{319} | — | October 31, 2011 | Mount Lemmon | Mount Lemmon Survey | · | 860 m | MPC · JPL |
| 803813 | 2015 RW_{319} | — | September 12, 2015 | Haleakala | Pan-STARRS 1 | · | 740 m | MPC · JPL |
| 803814 | 2015 RN_{323} | — | September 10, 2015 | Haleakala | Pan-STARRS 1 | · | 2.0 km | MPC · JPL |
| 803815 | 2015 RM_{325} | — | September 12, 2015 | Haleakala | Pan-STARRS 1 | · | 1.4 km | MPC · JPL |
| 803816 | 2015 RO_{327} | — | September 9, 2015 | Haleakala | Pan-STARRS 1 | · | 1.4 km | MPC · JPL |
| 803817 | 2015 RP_{327} | — | September 12, 2015 | Haleakala | Pan-STARRS 1 | · | 1.2 km | MPC · JPL |
| 803818 | 2015 RK_{333} | — | September 12, 2015 | Haleakala | Pan-STARRS 1 | · | 1.0 km | MPC · JPL |
| 803819 | 2015 RF_{335} | — | September 12, 2015 | Haleakala | Pan-STARRS 1 | · | 2.0 km | MPC · JPL |
| 803820 | 2015 RE_{336} | — | September 12, 2015 | Haleakala | Pan-STARRS 1 | · | 1.6 km | MPC · JPL |
| 803821 | 2015 RY_{342} | — | September 11, 2015 | Haleakala | Pan-STARRS 1 | THM | 1.7 km | MPC · JPL |
| 803822 | 2015 RA_{343} | — | September 12, 2015 | Haleakala | Pan-STARRS 1 | · | 1.1 km | MPC · JPL |
| 803823 | 2015 RV_{345} | — | September 4, 2015 | Kitt Peak | Spacewatch | · | 2.3 km | MPC · JPL |
| 803824 | 2015 RR_{347} | — | September 6, 2015 | Haleakala | Pan-STARRS 1 | · | 1.9 km | MPC · JPL |
| 803825 | 2015 RT_{349} | — | November 2, 2010 | Mount Lemmon | Mount Lemmon Survey | · | 2.1 km | MPC · JPL |
| 803826 | 2015 RO_{352} | — | September 12, 2015 | Haleakala | Pan-STARRS 1 | (260) | 2.6 km | MPC · JPL |
| 803827 | 2015 RN_{356} | — | September 12, 2015 | Haleakala | Pan-STARRS 1 | KON | 1.4 km | MPC · JPL |
| 803828 | 2015 RS_{360} | — | September 9, 2015 | Haleakala | Pan-STARRS 1 | · | 1.1 km | MPC · JPL |
| 803829 | 2015 RX_{360} | — | September 9, 2015 | Haleakala | Pan-STARRS 1 | VER | 2.0 km | MPC · JPL |
| 803830 | 2015 RD_{363} | — | September 9, 2015 | Haleakala | Pan-STARRS 1 | · | 980 m | MPC · JPL |
| 803831 | 2015 RN_{378} | — | March 24, 2014 | Haleakala | Pan-STARRS 1 | · | 1.3 km | MPC · JPL |
| 803832 | 2015 RU_{380} | — | September 5, 2015 | Haleakala | Pan-STARRS 1 | EOS | 1.3 km | MPC · JPL |
| 803833 | 2015 RZ_{380} | — | March 11, 2005 | Mount Lemmon | Mount Lemmon Survey | · | 810 m | MPC · JPL |
| 803834 | 2015 RA_{381} | — | September 9, 2015 | Haleakala | Pan-STARRS 1 | MAR | 700 m | MPC · JPL |
| 803835 | 2015 RF_{381} | — | March 5, 2013 | Mount Lemmon | Mount Lemmon Survey | EOS | 1.3 km | MPC · JPL |
| 803836 | 2015 RG_{382} | — | September 11, 2015 | Haleakala | Pan-STARRS 1 | · | 720 m | MPC · JPL |
| 803837 | 2015 RG_{385} | — | September 9, 2015 | Haleakala | Pan-STARRS 1 | · | 1.1 km | MPC · JPL |
| 803838 | 2015 RH_{385} | — | September 12, 2015 | Haleakala | Pan-STARRS 1 | · | 1.3 km | MPC · JPL |
| 803839 | 2015 RF_{392} | — | September 12, 2015 | Haleakala | Pan-STARRS 1 | · | 1.1 km | MPC · JPL |
| 803840 | 2015 SA_{2} | — | July 28, 2015 | Haleakala | Pan-STARRS 1 | · | 2.3 km | MPC · JPL |
| 803841 | 2015 SX_{3} | — | September 17, 2006 | Catalina | CSS | · | 1.5 km | MPC · JPL |
| 803842 | 2015 SO_{9} | — | September 23, 2008 | Mount Lemmon | Mount Lemmon Survey | · | 750 m | MPC · JPL |
| 803843 | 2015 SA_{19} | — | June 26, 2015 | Haleakala | Pan-STARRS 1 | DOR | 1.7 km | MPC · JPL |
| 803844 | 2015 SV_{21} | — | September 23, 2015 | Haleakala | Pan-STARRS 1 | H | 440 m | MPC · JPL |
| 803845 | 2015 SP_{33} | — | September 23, 2015 | Haleakala | Pan-STARRS 1 | · | 1.1 km | MPC · JPL |
| 803846 | 2015 SU_{33} | — | September 23, 2015 | Haleakala | Pan-STARRS 1 | · | 860 m | MPC · JPL |
| 803847 | 2015 SN_{35} | — | September 24, 2015 | Mount Lemmon | Mount Lemmon Survey | · | 980 m | MPC · JPL |
| 803848 | 2015 SU_{37} | — | September 23, 2015 | Haleakala | Pan-STARRS 1 | · | 1.6 km | MPC · JPL |
| 803849 | 2015 SR_{45} | — | September 19, 2015 | Haleakala | Pan-STARRS 1 | · | 2.0 km | MPC · JPL |
| 803850 | 2015 SE_{46} | — | September 23, 2015 | Haleakala | Pan-STARRS 1 | · | 1.1 km | MPC · JPL |
| 803851 | 2015 SW_{48} | — | September 23, 2015 | Mount Lemmon | Mount Lemmon Survey | · | 2.2 km | MPC · JPL |
| 803852 | 2015 SX_{49} | — | September 18, 2015 | Kitt Peak | Spacewatch | (260) | 2.3 km | MPC · JPL |
| 803853 | 2015 SY_{54} | — | September 23, 2015 | Haleakala | Pan-STARRS 1 | TIR | 2.0 km | MPC · JPL |
| 803854 | 2015 SH_{57} | — | September 23, 2015 | Haleakala | Pan-STARRS 1 | KON | 1.6 km | MPC · JPL |
| 803855 | 2015 TY | — | October 3, 2015 | Mount Lemmon | Mount Lemmon Survey | H | 420 m | MPC · JPL |
| 803856 | 2015 TL_{8} | — | August 13, 2015 | XuYi | PMO NEO Survey Program | · | 2.7 km | MPC · JPL |
| 803857 | 2015 TH_{9} | — | October 5, 2004 | Kitt Peak | Spacewatch | · | 2.7 km | MPC · JPL |
| 803858 | 2015 TT_{13} | — | July 28, 2015 | Haleakala | Pan-STARRS 1 | · | 2.3 km | MPC · JPL |
| 803859 | 2015 TL_{16} | — | September 17, 2004 | Kitt Peak | Spacewatch | · | 1.9 km | MPC · JPL |
| 803860 | 2015 TM_{17} | — | November 27, 2010 | Mount Lemmon | Mount Lemmon Survey | · | 2.5 km | MPC · JPL |
| 803861 | 2015 TN_{17} | — | October 2, 2015 | Haleakala | Pan-STARRS 1 | · | 2.1 km | MPC · JPL |
| 803862 | 2015 TP_{17} | — | November 9, 2007 | Kitt Peak | Spacewatch | EUN | 760 m | MPC · JPL |
| 803863 | 2015 TC_{21} | — | October 2, 2015 | Haleakala | Pan-STARRS 1 | H | 550 m | MPC · JPL |
| 803864 | 2015 TR_{21} | — | October 25, 2008 | Mount Lemmon | Mount Lemmon Survey | · | 680 m | MPC · JPL |
| 803865 | 2015 TE_{23} | — | October 6, 2015 | Oukaïmeden | C. Rinner | · | 1.0 km | MPC · JPL |
| 803866 | 2015 TM_{30} | — | October 15, 2007 | Kitt Peak | Spacewatch | · | 960 m | MPC · JPL |
| 803867 | 2015 TT_{32} | — | April 6, 2014 | Mount Lemmon | Mount Lemmon Survey | · | 1.8 km | MPC · JPL |
| 803868 | 2015 TK_{36} | — | July 19, 2015 | Haleakala | Pan-STARRS 1 | LIX | 2.8 km | MPC · JPL |
| 803869 | 2015 TA_{37} | — | May 25, 2003 | Kitt Peak | Spacewatch | LIX | 2.9 km | MPC · JPL |
| 803870 | 2015 TD_{37} | — | July 19, 2015 | Haleakala | Pan-STARRS 1 | · | 2.3 km | MPC · JPL |
| 803871 | 2015 TT_{37} | — | August 9, 2015 | Haleakala | Pan-STARRS 1 | · | 1.4 km | MPC · JPL |
| 803872 | 2015 TA_{44} | — | September 29, 2011 | Mount Lemmon | Mount Lemmon Survey | · | 1.0 km | MPC · JPL |
| 803873 | 2015 TA_{45} | — | September 18, 2015 | Mount Lemmon | Mount Lemmon Survey | · | 1.1 km | MPC · JPL |
| 803874 | 2015 TN_{48} | — | November 13, 2010 | Kitt Peak | Spacewatch | HYG | 2.3 km | MPC · JPL |
| 803875 | 2015 TN_{53} | — | July 23, 2015 | Haleakala | Pan-STARRS 1 | · | 1.6 km | MPC · JPL |
| 803876 | 2015 TC_{56} | — | September 18, 2015 | Mount Lemmon | Mount Lemmon Survey | · | 2.6 km | MPC · JPL |
| 803877 | 2015 TK_{66} | — | October 8, 2015 | Haleakala | Pan-STARRS 1 | · | 2.9 km | MPC · JPL |
| 803878 | 2015 TA_{67} | — | October 8, 2015 | Haleakala | Pan-STARRS 1 | · | 1.2 km | MPC · JPL |
| 803879 | 2015 TJ_{74} | — | October 8, 2015 | Haleakala | Pan-STARRS 1 | · | 880 m | MPC · JPL |
| 803880 | 2015 TZ_{77} | — | April 23, 2014 | Haleakala | Pan-STARRS 1 | H | 540 m | MPC · JPL |
| 803881 | 2015 TS_{80} | — | August 9, 2015 | Haleakala | Pan-STARRS 1 | · | 630 m | MPC · JPL |
| 803882 | 2015 TL_{87} | — | October 8, 2015 | Haleakala | Pan-STARRS 1 | · | 690 m | MPC · JPL |
| 803883 | 2015 TO_{88} | — | December 31, 2011 | Mount Lemmon | Mount Lemmon Survey | · | 930 m | MPC · JPL |
| 803884 | 2015 TQ_{91} | — | October 8, 2015 | Haleakala | Pan-STARRS 1 | · | 850 m | MPC · JPL |
| 803885 | 2015 TR_{94} | — | October 8, 2015 | Haleakala | Pan-STARRS 1 | · | 2.1 km | MPC · JPL |
| 803886 | 2015 TZ_{98} | — | October 8, 2015 | Haleakala | Pan-STARRS 1 | · | 1.4 km | MPC · JPL |
| 803887 | 2015 TV_{107} | — | October 8, 2015 | Haleakala | Pan-STARRS 1 | · | 1.1 km | MPC · JPL |
| 803888 | 2015 TQ_{110} | — | September 17, 2006 | Kitt Peak | Spacewatch | · | 1.1 km | MPC · JPL |
| 803889 | 2015 TY_{112} | — | October 8, 2015 | Haleakala | Pan-STARRS 1 | · | 690 m | MPC · JPL |
| 803890 | 2015 TL_{116} | — | October 8, 2015 | Haleakala | Pan-STARRS 1 | · | 960 m | MPC · JPL |
| 803891 | 2015 TV_{116} | — | September 19, 2015 | Haleakala | Pan-STARRS 1 | · | 1.2 km | MPC · JPL |
| 803892 | 2015 TO_{120} | — | October 8, 2015 | Haleakala | Pan-STARRS 1 | MAR | 660 m | MPC · JPL |
| 803893 | 2015 TX_{125} | — | October 8, 2015 | Haleakala | Pan-STARRS 1 | · | 810 m | MPC · JPL |
| 803894 | 2015 TP_{127} | — | October 8, 2015 | Haleakala | Pan-STARRS 1 | H | 400 m | MPC · JPL |
| 803895 | 2015 TV_{127} | — | September 12, 2015 | Haleakala | Pan-STARRS 1 | · | 1.3 km | MPC · JPL |
| 803896 | 2015 TT_{128} | — | October 8, 2015 | Haleakala | Pan-STARRS 1 | · | 780 m | MPC · JPL |
| 803897 | 2015 TG_{131} | — | September 12, 2015 | Haleakala | Pan-STARRS 1 | RAF | 670 m | MPC · JPL |
| 803898 | 2015 TQ_{133} | — | October 8, 2015 | Haleakala | Pan-STARRS 1 | · | 2.1 km | MPC · JPL |
| 803899 | 2015 TB_{135} | — | October 8, 2015 | Haleakala | Pan-STARRS 1 | · | 830 m | MPC · JPL |
| 803900 | 2015 TR_{139} | — | May 15, 2013 | Haleakala | Pan-STARRS 1 | · | 1.8 km | MPC · JPL |

== 803901–804000 ==
back to top

| Designation | | | Discovery | | | Properties | | Ref |
| Permanent | Provisional | Named after | Date | Site | Discoverer(s) | Category | Diam. | Ref |
|---|---|---|---|---|---|---|---|---|
| 803901 | 2015 TT_{142} | — | September 12, 2015 | Haleakala | Pan-STARRS 1 | KON | 1.5 km | MPC · JPL |
| 803902 | 2015 TE_{143} | — | October 8, 2015 | Haleakala | Pan-STARRS 1 | · | 970 m | MPC · JPL |
| 803903 | 2015 TU_{169} | — | October 9, 2015 | Haleakala | Pan-STARRS 1 | · | 2.6 km | MPC · JPL |
| 803904 | 2015 TY_{171} | — | October 9, 2015 | Haleakala | Pan-STARRS 1 | · | 2.3 km | MPC · JPL |
| 803905 | 2015 TG_{192} | — | July 23, 2015 | Haleakala | Pan-STARRS 1 | · | 2.2 km | MPC · JPL |
| 803906 | 2015 TB_{193} | — | July 23, 2015 | Haleakala | Pan-STARRS 1 | · | 810 m | MPC · JPL |
| 803907 | 2015 TJ_{195} | — | September 24, 2015 | Catalina | CSS | PHO | 810 m | MPC · JPL |
| 803908 | 2015 TX_{197} | — | August 12, 2015 | Haleakala | Pan-STARRS 1 | · | 970 m | MPC · JPL |
| 803909 | 2015 TN_{208} | — | July 25, 2015 | Haleakala | Pan-STARRS 1 | · | 1.1 km | MPC · JPL |
| 803910 | 2015 TA_{217} | — | September 11, 2015 | Haleakala | Pan-STARRS 1 | · | 1.2 km | MPC · JPL |
| 803911 | 2015 TM_{218} | — | January 6, 2006 | Kitt Peak | Spacewatch | · | 1.4 km | MPC · JPL |
| 803912 | 2015 TC_{220} | — | September 18, 2015 | Mount Lemmon | Mount Lemmon Survey | · | 2.0 km | MPC · JPL |
| 803913 | 2015 TW_{225} | — | October 10, 2015 | Haleakala | Pan-STARRS 1 | · | 990 m | MPC · JPL |
| 803914 | 2015 TG_{226} | — | September 10, 2015 | Haleakala | Pan-STARRS 1 | JUN | 690 m | MPC · JPL |
| 803915 | 2015 TW_{227} | — | October 10, 2015 | Haleakala | Pan-STARRS 1 | · | 920 m | MPC · JPL |
| 803916 | 2015 TT_{228} | — | November 9, 2007 | Kitt Peak | Spacewatch | HNS | 710 m | MPC · JPL |
| 803917 | 2015 TP_{230} | — | September 24, 2015 | Mount Lemmon | Mount Lemmon Survey | ADE | 1.4 km | MPC · JPL |
| 803918 | 2015 TR_{230} | — | October 3, 2005 | Kitt Peak | Spacewatch | BRA | 1.1 km | MPC · JPL |
| 803919 | 2015 TQ_{232} | — | August 12, 2015 | Haleakala | Pan-STARRS 1 | · | 1.2 km | MPC · JPL |
| 803920 | 2015 TK_{233} | — | September 24, 2015 | Mount Lemmon | Mount Lemmon Survey | · | 2.4 km | MPC · JPL |
| 803921 | 2015 TN_{236} | — | October 11, 2015 | Mount Lemmon | Mount Lemmon Survey | · | 980 m | MPC · JPL |
| 803922 | 2015 TA_{237} | — | January 30, 2008 | Mount Lemmon | Mount Lemmon Survey | · | 1.3 km | MPC · JPL |
| 803923 | 2015 TE_{237} | — | October 13, 2007 | Mount Lemmon | Mount Lemmon Survey | H | 370 m | MPC · JPL |
| 803924 | 2015 TH_{239} | — | June 20, 2012 | Kitt Peak | Spacewatch | H | 540 m | MPC · JPL |
| 803925 | 2015 TJ_{239} | — | May 18, 2015 | Haleakala | Pan-STARRS 1 | · | 840 m | MPC · JPL |
| 803926 | 2015 TM_{242} | — | May 6, 2014 | Mount Lemmon | Mount Lemmon Survey | H | 470 m | MPC · JPL |
| 803927 | 2015 TU_{243} | — | July 25, 2015 | Haleakala | Pan-STARRS 1 | · | 990 m | MPC · JPL |
| 803928 | 2015 TG_{244} | — | May 23, 2014 | Haleakala | Pan-STARRS 1 | · | 2.3 km | MPC · JPL |
| 803929 | 2015 TZ_{245} | — | October 10, 2015 | Haleakala | Pan-STARRS 1 | · | 2.1 km | MPC · JPL |
| 803930 | 2015 TM_{246} | — | October 2, 2015 | Mount Lemmon | Mount Lemmon Survey | · | 1.4 km | MPC · JPL |
| 803931 | 2015 TC_{248} | — | September 11, 2015 | Haleakala | Pan-STARRS 1 | THM | 1.9 km | MPC · JPL |
| 803932 | 2015 TD_{251} | — | October 10, 2015 | Haleakala | Pan-STARRS 1 | KOR | 980 m | MPC · JPL |
| 803933 | 2015 TU_{257} | — | May 27, 2014 | Haleakala | Pan-STARRS 1 | TIR | 2.5 km | MPC · JPL |
| 803934 | 2015 TW_{257} | — | May 10, 2014 | Haleakala | Pan-STARRS 1 | (895) | 2.9 km | MPC · JPL |
| 803935 | 2015 TD_{262} | — | October 12, 2015 | Haleakala | Pan-STARRS 1 | · | 1.5 km | MPC · JPL |
| 803936 | 2015 TS_{266} | — | September 6, 2015 | Haleakala | Pan-STARRS 1 | · | 2.3 km | MPC · JPL |
| 803937 | 2015 TP_{272} | — | May 1, 2009 | Kitt Peak | Spacewatch | H | 390 m | MPC · JPL |
| 803938 | 2015 TG_{280} | — | September 12, 2015 | Haleakala | Pan-STARRS 1 | · | 1.4 km | MPC · JPL |
| 803939 | 2015 TF_{283} | — | February 20, 2009 | Kitt Peak | Spacewatch | · | 1.2 km | MPC · JPL |
| 803940 | 2015 TO_{285} | — | May 3, 2014 | Kitt Peak | Spacewatch | TIR | 1.7 km | MPC · JPL |
| 803941 | 2015 TK_{290} | — | October 12, 2015 | Space Surveillance | Space Surveillance Telescope | H | 600 m | MPC · JPL |
| 803942 | 2015 TY_{290} | — | September 25, 2015 | Mount Lemmon | Mount Lemmon Survey | · | 2.3 km | MPC · JPL |
| 803943 | 2015 TD_{292} | — | October 8, 2015 | Mount Lemmon | Mount Lemmon Survey | T_{j} (2.99) · EUP | 2.6 km | MPC · JPL |
| 803944 | 2015 TA_{294} | — | October 18, 2011 | Kitt Peak | Spacewatch | · | 750 m | MPC · JPL |
| 803945 | 2015 TQ_{294} | — | October 2, 2015 | Mount Lemmon | Mount Lemmon Survey | · | 2.0 km | MPC · JPL |
| 803946 | 2015 TW_{296} | — | September 12, 2015 | Haleakala | Pan-STARRS 1 | · | 1.2 km | MPC · JPL |
| 803947 | 2015 TY_{298} | — | September 8, 2015 | XuYi | PMO NEO Survey Program | · | 1.1 km | MPC · JPL |
| 803948 | 2015 TF_{300} | — | September 9, 2015 | Haleakala | Pan-STARRS 1 | · | 1.1 km | MPC · JPL |
| 803949 | 2015 TW_{301} | — | October 12, 2015 | Haleakala | Pan-STARRS 1 | · | 1.1 km | MPC · JPL |
| 803950 | 2015 TZ_{301} | — | October 22, 2011 | Kitt Peak | Spacewatch | · | 900 m | MPC · JPL |
| 803951 | 2015 TG_{312} | — | July 26, 2014 | Haleakala | Pan-STARRS 1 | · | 1.1 km | MPC · JPL |
| 803952 | 2015 TC_{314} | — | September 12, 2015 | Haleakala | Pan-STARRS 1 | · | 700 m | MPC · JPL |
| 803953 | 2015 TL_{316} | — | September 12, 2004 | Kitt Peak | Spacewatch | · | 680 m | MPC · JPL |
| 803954 | 2015 TS_{317} | — | October 2, 2015 | Mount Lemmon | Mount Lemmon Survey | · | 1.1 km | MPC · JPL |
| 803955 | 2015 TN_{321} | — | August 16, 2009 | Kitt Peak | Spacewatch | · | 2.2 km | MPC · JPL |
| 803956 | 2015 TT_{321} | — | December 18, 2001 | Sacramento Peak | SDSS | H | 460 m | MPC · JPL |
| 803957 | 2015 TC_{326} | — | September 23, 2015 | Haleakala | Pan-STARRS 1 | · | 2.2 km | MPC · JPL |
| 803958 | 2015 TL_{327} | — | October 13, 2015 | Haleakala | Pan-STARRS 1 | · | 1.9 km | MPC · JPL |
| 803959 | 2015 TZ_{335} | — | October 10, 2015 | Kitt Peak | Spacewatch | · | 960 m | MPC · JPL |
| 803960 | 2015 TL_{339} | — | September 15, 2010 | Kitt Peak | Spacewatch | · | 1.7 km | MPC · JPL |
| 803961 | 2015 TS_{340} | — | November 12, 2010 | Mount Lemmon | Mount Lemmon Survey | · | 2.2 km | MPC · JPL |
| 803962 | 2015 TA_{341} | — | November 13, 2010 | Puebla de Don Fadrique | OAM | · | 2.1 km | MPC · JPL |
| 803963 | 2015 TO_{341} | — | November 11, 2010 | Mount Lemmon | Mount Lemmon Survey | · | 3.0 km | MPC · JPL |
| 803964 | 2015 TJ_{343} | — | September 9, 2015 | Haleakala | Pan-STARRS 1 | · | 1.0 km | MPC · JPL |
| 803965 | 2015 TU_{343} | — | April 9, 2003 | Kitt Peak | Spacewatch | MAS | 610 m | MPC · JPL |
| 803966 | 2015 TF_{347} | — | September 12, 2015 | Haleakala | Pan-STARRS 1 | · | 2.7 km | MPC · JPL |
| 803967 | 2015 TK_{351} | — | October 8, 2015 | Haleakala | Pan-STARRS 1 | H | 480 m | MPC · JPL |
| 803968 | 2015 TC_{353} | — | October 3, 2015 | Haleakala | Pan-STARRS 1 | H | 440 m | MPC · JPL |
| 803969 | 2015 TH_{353} | — | September 24, 2012 | Mount Lemmon | Mount Lemmon Survey | H | 430 m | MPC · JPL |
| 803970 | 2015 TM_{354} | — | October 8, 2015 | Haleakala | Pan-STARRS 1 | · | 1.2 km | MPC · JPL |
| 803971 | 2015 TA_{355} | — | October 8, 2015 | Haleakala | Pan-STARRS 1 | · | 1.1 km | MPC · JPL |
| 803972 | 2015 TC_{355} | — | October 8, 2015 | Haleakala | Pan-STARRS 1 | · | 1.1 km | MPC · JPL |
| 803973 | 2015 TD_{355} | — | October 8, 2015 | Haleakala | Pan-STARRS 1 | · | 840 m | MPC · JPL |
| 803974 | 2015 TG_{357} | — | October 10, 2015 | Haleakala | Pan-STARRS 1 | MAR | 680 m | MPC · JPL |
| 803975 | 2015 TG_{371} | — | February 3, 2012 | Haleakala | Pan-STARRS 1 | · | 1.2 km | MPC · JPL |
| 803976 | 2015 TD_{374} | — | October 8, 2015 | Haleakala | Pan-STARRS 1 | EUN | 740 m | MPC · JPL |
| 803977 | 2015 TA_{375} | — | October 26, 2011 | Haleakala | Pan-STARRS 1 | MAR | 570 m | MPC · JPL |
| 803978 | 2015 TL_{375} | — | October 9, 2015 | Haleakala | Pan-STARRS 1 | · | 1.7 km | MPC · JPL |
| 803979 | 2015 TO_{375} | — | October 9, 2015 | Haleakala | Pan-STARRS 1 | · | 1.3 km | MPC · JPL |
| 803980 | 2015 TG_{382} | — | October 10, 2015 | Haleakala | Pan-STARRS 1 | · | 1.2 km | MPC · JPL |
| 803981 | 2015 TJ_{383} | — | October 10, 2015 | Haleakala | Pan-STARRS 1 | · | 1.8 km | MPC · JPL |
| 803982 | 2015 TF_{384} | — | June 4, 2014 | Haleakala | Pan-STARRS 1 | · | 2.1 km | MPC · JPL |
| 803983 | 2015 TK_{384} | — | February 23, 2012 | Mount Lemmon | Mount Lemmon Survey | EOS | 1.3 km | MPC · JPL |
| 803984 | 2015 TS_{384} | — | October 12, 2015 | Haleakala | Pan-STARRS 1 | · | 1.5 km | MPC · JPL |
| 803985 | 2015 TV_{387} | — | October 9, 2015 | Haleakala | Pan-STARRS 1 | · | 950 m | MPC · JPL |
| 803986 | 2015 TQ_{388} | — | October 1, 2015 | Mount Lemmon | Mount Lemmon Survey | · | 950 m | MPC · JPL |
| 803987 | 2015 TL_{389} | — | October 10, 2015 | Haleakala | Pan-STARRS 1 | · | 780 m | MPC · JPL |
| 803988 | 2015 TK_{390} | — | October 14, 2015 | Mount Lemmon | Mount Lemmon Survey | · | 1.0 km | MPC · JPL |
| 803989 | 2015 TP_{390} | — | October 8, 2015 | Haleakala | Pan-STARRS 1 | · | 730 m | MPC · JPL |
| 803990 | 2015 TC_{391} | — | October 8, 2015 | Haleakala | Pan-STARRS 1 | · | 940 m | MPC · JPL |
| 803991 | 2015 TD_{391} | — | October 1, 2015 | Mount Lemmon | Mount Lemmon Survey | · | 2.3 km | MPC · JPL |
| 803992 | 2015 TP_{391} | — | October 9, 2015 | Haleakala | Pan-STARRS 1 | · | 2.0 km | MPC · JPL |
| 803993 | 2015 TP_{392} | — | October 10, 2015 | Haleakala | Pan-STARRS 1 | · | 1.0 km | MPC · JPL |
| 803994 | 2015 TC_{393} | — | October 13, 2015 | Haleakala | Pan-STARRS 1 | · | 1.0 km | MPC · JPL |
| 803995 | 2015 TL_{393} | — | October 13, 2015 | Haleakala | Pan-STARRS 1 | JUN | 710 m | MPC · JPL |
| 803996 | 2015 TW_{393} | — | October 8, 2015 | Haleakala | Pan-STARRS 1 | BAR | 770 m | MPC · JPL |
| 803997 | 2015 TZ_{393} | — | October 10, 2015 | Haleakala | Pan-STARRS 1 | · | 1.2 km | MPC · JPL |
| 803998 | 2015 TJ_{394} | — | October 9, 2015 | Haleakala | Pan-STARRS 1 | · | 1.1 km | MPC · JPL |
| 803999 | 2015 TQ_{394} | — | October 13, 2015 | Haleakala | Pan-STARRS 1 | EUN | 810 m | MPC · JPL |
| 804000 | 2015 TL_{398} | — | October 8, 2015 | Haleakala | Pan-STARRS 1 | critical | 1.2 km | MPC · JPL |

back to top
