= List of minor planets: 759001–760000 =

The following is a partial list of minor planets, running from minor-planet number 759001 through 760000, inclusive. The primary data for this and other partial lists is based on JPL's "Small-Body Orbital Elements" and data available from the Minor Planet Center. Critical list information is also provided by the MPC, unless otherwise specified from Lowell Observatory. A detailed description of the table's columns and additional sources are given on the main page including a complete list of every page in this series, and a statistical break-up on the dynamical classification of minor planets.

Also see the summary list of all named bodies in numerical and alphabetical order, and the corresponding naming citations for the number range of this particular list. New namings may only be added to this list after official publication, as the preannouncement of names is condemned by the Working Group for Small Bodies Nomenclature of the International Astronomical Union.

Near-Earth obj.	MBA (inner)	MBA (outer)	Centaur
Mars-crosser	MBA (middle)	Jupiter trojan	Trans-Neptunian obj.
Unclassified

== 759001–759100 ==
Designation			Discovery			Properties		Ref
Permanent	Provisional	Named after	Date	Site	Discoverer(s)	Category	Diam.	Ref
759001	2007 RU_{127}	—	September 12, 2007	Mount Lemmon	Mount Lemmon Survey	VER	1.8 km	MPC · JPL
759002	2007 RQ_{131}	—	September 12, 2007	Catalina	CSS	·	3.1 km	MPC · JPL
759003	2007 RG_{132}	—	September 12, 2007	Mount Lemmon	Mount Lemmon Survey	MAR	820 m	MPC · JPL
759004	2007 RR_{158}	—	September 12, 2007	Mount Lemmon	Mount Lemmon Survey	·	960 m	MPC · JPL
759005	2007 RB_{159}	—	September 12, 2007	Mount Lemmon	Mount Lemmon Survey	·	450 m	MPC · JPL
759006	2007 RY_{166}	—	September 10, 2007	Kitt Peak	Spacewatch	3:2 · SHU	4.0 km	MPC · JPL
759007	2007 RH_{167}	—	September 10, 2007	Kitt Peak	Spacewatch	·	1.8 km	MPC · JPL
759008	2007 RK_{167}	—	September 10, 2007	Kitt Peak	Spacewatch	·	2.0 km	MPC · JPL
759009	2007 RJ_{170}	—	August 10, 2007	Kitt Peak	Spacewatch	·	2.1 km	MPC · JPL
759010	2007 RY_{175}	—	September 8, 2007	Mount Lemmon	Mount Lemmon Survey	·	2.6 km	MPC · JPL
759011	2007 RT_{183}	—	September 12, 2007	Mount Lemmon	Mount Lemmon Survey	·	830 m	MPC · JPL
759012	2007 RQ_{197}	—	September 13, 2007	Mount Lemmon	Mount Lemmon Survey	·	1.9 km	MPC · JPL
759013	2007 RT_{197}	—	September 13, 2007	Mount Lemmon	Mount Lemmon Survey	·	1.9 km	MPC · JPL
759014	2007 RF_{201}	—	September 13, 2007	Kitt Peak	Spacewatch	·	920 m	MPC · JPL
759015	2007 RK_{202}	—	September 13, 2007	Kitt Peak	Spacewatch	(5)	670 m	MPC · JPL
759016	2007 RY_{202}	—	September 13, 2007	Kitt Peak	Spacewatch	JUN	660 m	MPC · JPL
759017	2007 RR_{203}	—	September 9, 2007	Mount Lemmon	Mount Lemmon Survey	·	1.9 km	MPC · JPL
759018	2007 RZ_{207}	—	September 10, 2007	Kitt Peak	Spacewatch	EOS	1.2 km	MPC · JPL
759019	2007 RE_{212}	—	September 11, 2007	Kitt Peak	Spacewatch	MAR	750 m	MPC · JPL
759020	2007 RM_{218}	—	September 14, 2007	Catalina	CSS	·	530 m	MPC · JPL
759021	2007 RR_{220}	—	September 14, 2007	Mount Lemmon	Mount Lemmon Survey	EOS	1.4 km	MPC · JPL
759022	2007 RO_{225}	—	August 23, 2007	Kitt Peak	Spacewatch	·	800 m	MPC · JPL
759023	2007 RR_{225}	—	September 10, 2007	Kitt Peak	Spacewatch	·	1.7 km	MPC · JPL
759024	2007 RH_{227}	—	September 10, 2007	Kitt Peak	Spacewatch	·	2.0 km	MPC · JPL
759025	2007 RT_{230}	—	September 11, 2007	Kitt Peak	Spacewatch	VER	2.0 km	MPC · JPL
759026	2007 RH_{244}	—	August 10, 2007	Kitt Peak	Spacewatch	·	480 m	MPC · JPL
759027	2007 RU_{247}	—	September 3, 2007	Catalina	CSS	·	2.5 km	MPC · JPL
759028	2007 RP_{248}	—	September 13, 2007	Mount Lemmon	Mount Lemmon Survey	·	1.0 km	MPC · JPL
759029	2007 RY_{249}	—	September 13, 2007	Kitt Peak	Spacewatch	·	1.1 km	MPC · JPL
759030	2007 RP_{250}	—	September 13, 2007	Kitt Peak	Spacewatch	·	1.8 km	MPC · JPL
759031	2007 RW_{251}	—	September 13, 2007	Kitt Peak	Spacewatch	·	2.0 km	MPC · JPL
759032	2007 RR_{252}	—	September 13, 2007	Mount Lemmon	Mount Lemmon Survey	·	2.0 km	MPC · JPL
759033	2007 RB_{255}	—	September 14, 2007	Kitt Peak	Spacewatch	·	480 m	MPC · JPL
759034	2007 RB_{261}	—	September 14, 2007	Kitt Peak	Spacewatch	·	600 m	MPC · JPL
759035	2007 RQ_{261}	—	September 10, 2007	Kitt Peak	Spacewatch	HYG	2.0 km	MPC · JPL
759036	2007 RT_{264}	—	September 15, 2007	Mount Lemmon	Mount Lemmon Survey	·	1 km	MPC · JPL
759037	2007 RT_{268}	—	September 10, 2007	Kitt Peak	Spacewatch	3:2	3.4 km	MPC · JPL
759038	2007 RS_{269}	—	March 5, 2006	Kitt Peak	Spacewatch	·	1.2 km	MPC · JPL
759039	2007 RN_{276}	—	February 4, 2005	Catalina	CSS	·	740 m	MPC · JPL
759040	2007 RV_{287}	—	September 10, 2007	Kitt Peak	Spacewatch	·	1.6 km	MPC · JPL
759041	2007 RJ_{288}	—	September 12, 2007	Mount Lemmon	Mount Lemmon Survey	·	2.1 km	MPC · JPL
759042	2007 RM_{293}	—	September 13, 2007	Mount Lemmon	Mount Lemmon Survey	MAS	540 m	MPC · JPL
759043	2007 RJ_{298}	—	September 9, 2007	Mount Lemmon	Mount Lemmon Survey	·	980 m	MPC · JPL
759044	2007 RB_{300}	—	September 13, 2007	Mount Lemmon	Mount Lemmon Survey	·	2.0 km	MPC · JPL
759045	2007 RG_{302}	—	September 14, 2007	Mount Lemmon	Mount Lemmon Survey	T_{j} (2.99) · 3:2	4.0 km	MPC · JPL
759046	2007 RL_{306}	—	September 14, 2007	Mauna Kea	P. A. Wiegert	EOS	1.4 km	MPC · JPL
759047	2007 RV_{317}	—	September 10, 2007	Catalina	CSS	·	2.2 km	MPC · JPL
759048	2007 RR_{320}	—	October 5, 2003	Kitt Peak	Spacewatch	BRG	1.2 km	MPC · JPL
759049	2007 RV_{321}	—	September 5, 2007	Mount Lemmon	Mount Lemmon Survey	·	2.2 km	MPC · JPL
759050	2007 RR_{324}	—	September 10, 2007	Mount Lemmon	Mount Lemmon Survey	·	3.3 km	MPC · JPL
759051	2007 RV_{325}	—	September 11, 2007	Mount Lemmon	Mount Lemmon Survey	·	1.9 km	MPC · JPL
759052	2007 RL_{328}	—	September 19, 2003	Kitt Peak	Spacewatch	(5)	930 m	MPC · JPL
759053	2007 RD_{330}	—	September 11, 2007	Mount Lemmon	Mount Lemmon Survey	·	1.1 km	MPC · JPL
759054	2007 RK_{330}	—	September 11, 2007	Mount Lemmon	Mount Lemmon Survey	·	520 m	MPC · JPL
759055	2007 RO_{331}	—	September 13, 2007	Mount Lemmon	Mount Lemmon Survey	THM	1.6 km	MPC · JPL
759056	2007 RV_{331}	—	September 13, 2007	Mount Lemmon	Mount Lemmon Survey	·	470 m	MPC · JPL
759057	2007 RJ_{332}	—	September 14, 2007	Mount Lemmon	Mount Lemmon Survey	·	500 m	MPC · JPL
759058	2007 RK_{332}	—	September 28, 1997	Kitt Peak	Spacewatch	·	420 m	MPC · JPL
759059	2007 RP_{334}	—	September 13, 2007	Mount Lemmon	Mount Lemmon Survey	·	1.3 km	MPC · JPL
759060	2007 RV_{334}	—	November 27, 2014	Haleakala	Pan-STARRS 1	·	440 m	MPC · JPL
759061	2007 RX_{334}	—	September 10, 2007	Kitt Peak	Spacewatch	TIR	2.4 km	MPC · JPL
759062	2007 RK_{335}	—	September 11, 2007	Mount Lemmon	Mount Lemmon Survey	·	1.4 km	MPC · JPL
759063	2007 RC_{340}	—	January 24, 2014	Haleakala	Pan-STARRS 1	·	1.3 km	MPC · JPL
759064	2007 RV_{341}	—	September 13, 2007	Kitt Peak	Spacewatch	·	2.5 km	MPC · JPL
759065	2007 RF_{342}	—	January 22, 2015	Haleakala	Pan-STARRS 1	·	1.4 km	MPC · JPL
759066	2007 RH_{343}	—	December 29, 2008	Mount Lemmon	Mount Lemmon Survey	·	650 m	MPC · JPL
759067	2007 RP_{343}	—	September 13, 2007	Kitt Peak	Spacewatch	·	1.6 km	MPC · JPL
759068	2007 RQ_{343}	—	September 14, 2007	Mount Lemmon	Mount Lemmon Survey	·	2.1 km	MPC · JPL
759069	2007 RR_{343}	—	September 15, 2007	Mount Lemmon	Mount Lemmon Survey	·	2.0 km	MPC · JPL
759070	2007 RY_{343}	—	September 13, 2007	Kitt Peak	Spacewatch	·	2.7 km	MPC · JPL
759071	2007 RX_{344}	—	December 28, 2013	Kitt Peak	Spacewatch	KOR	950 m	MPC · JPL
759072	2007 RB_{345}	—	October 24, 2011	Haleakala	Pan-STARRS 1	V	450 m	MPC · JPL
759073	2007 RE_{345}	—	September 25, 2014	Kitt Peak	Spacewatch	·	610 m	MPC · JPL
759074	2007 RJ_{345}	—	January 17, 2015	Haleakala	Pan-STARRS 1	·	1.8 km	MPC · JPL
759075	2007 RM_{345}	—	September 19, 2017	Haleakala	Pan-STARRS 1	·	460 m	MPC · JPL
759076	2007 RL_{346}	—	September 14, 2007	Mount Lemmon	Mount Lemmon Survey	·	2.2 km	MPC · JPL
759077	2007 RZ_{347}	—	January 18, 2015	Mount Lemmon	Mount Lemmon Survey	EOS	1.5 km	MPC · JPL
759078	2007 RK_{348}	—	September 10, 2007	Kitt Peak	Spacewatch	·	920 m	MPC · JPL
759079	2007 RO_{348}	—	September 14, 2007	Mount Lemmon	Mount Lemmon Survey	EOS	1.6 km	MPC · JPL
759080	2007 RR_{348}	—	September 4, 2007	Mount Lemmon	Mount Lemmon Survey	L4	5.8 km	MPC · JPL
759081	2007 RS_{349}	—	September 13, 2007	Mount Lemmon	Mount Lemmon Survey	·	2.7 km	MPC · JPL
759082	2007 RD_{351}	—	November 9, 2013	Haleakala	Pan-STARRS 1	·	1.6 km	MPC · JPL
759083	2007 RF_{351}	—	January 18, 2009	Mount Lemmon	Mount Lemmon Survey	HYG	2.0 km	MPC · JPL
759084	2007 RN_{351}	—	September 5, 2007	Mount Lemmon	Mount Lemmon Survey	·	2.3 km	MPC · JPL
759085	2007 RS_{351}	—	October 12, 2013	Kitt Peak	Spacewatch	VER	2.1 km	MPC · JPL
759086	2007 RN_{352}	—	January 17, 2015	Haleakala	Pan-STARRS 1	EOS	1.3 km	MPC · JPL
759087	2007 RP_{352}	—	January 2, 2012	Mount Lemmon	Mount Lemmon Survey	L4	7.3 km	MPC · JPL
759088	2007 RS_{353}	—	September 14, 2007	Catalina	CSS	·	580 m	MPC · JPL
759089	2007 RY_{353}	—	September 12, 2007	Mount Lemmon	Mount Lemmon Survey	·	1.8 km	MPC · JPL
759090	2007 RJ_{354}	—	September 12, 2007	Mount Lemmon	Mount Lemmon Survey	·	1.8 km	MPC · JPL
759091	2007 RS_{354}	—	September 13, 2007	Mount Lemmon	Mount Lemmon Survey	EOS	1.3 km	MPC · JPL
759092	2007 RT_{354}	—	September 13, 2007	Mount Lemmon	Mount Lemmon Survey	·	1.9 km	MPC · JPL
759093	2007 RF_{355}	—	September 14, 2007	Mount Lemmon	Mount Lemmon Survey	·	1.8 km	MPC · JPL
759094	2007 RN_{355}	—	September 13, 2007	Mount Lemmon	Mount Lemmon Survey	·	2.1 km	MPC · JPL
759095	2007 RQ_{355}	—	September 10, 2007	Mount Lemmon	Mount Lemmon Survey	·	1.1 km	MPC · JPL
759096	2007 RT_{355}	—	September 12, 2007	Mount Lemmon	Mount Lemmon Survey	EOS	1.2 km	MPC · JPL
759097	2007 RO_{356}	—	September 15, 2007	Mount Lemmon	Mount Lemmon Survey	·	2.4 km	MPC · JPL
759098	2007 RR_{356}	—	September 14, 2007	Mount Lemmon	Mount Lemmon Survey	·	1.9 km	MPC · JPL
759099	2007 RB_{359}	—	September 14, 2007	Catalina	CSS	·	2.1 km	MPC · JPL
759100	2007 RD_{359}	—	September 15, 2007	Lulin	LUSS	·	2.8 km	MPC · JPL

== 759101–759200 ==
back to top

Designation			Discovery			Properties		Ref
Permanent	Provisional	Named after	Date	Site	Discoverer(s)	Category	Diam.	Ref
759101	2007 RM_{359}	—	September 13, 2007	Kitt Peak	Spacewatch	·	2.2 km	MPC · JPL
759102	2007 RQ_{363}	—	September 10, 2007	Mount Lemmon	Mount Lemmon Survey	·	1.6 km	MPC · JPL
759103	2007 RR_{364}	—	September 10, 2007	Mount Lemmon	Mount Lemmon Survey	·	1.2 km	MPC · JPL
759104	2007 RE_{365}	—	September 13, 2007	Mount Lemmon	Mount Lemmon Survey	·	1.3 km	MPC · JPL
759105	2007 RW_{365}	—	September 10, 2007	Mount Lemmon	Mount Lemmon Survey	·	930 m	MPC · JPL
759106	2007 RJ_{367}	—	September 12, 2007	Mount Lemmon	Mount Lemmon Survey	·	1.0 km	MPC · JPL
759107	2007 RO_{367}	—	September 11, 2007	Mount Lemmon	Mount Lemmon Survey	·	2.7 km	MPC · JPL
759108	2007 RP_{367}	—	September 10, 2007	Mount Lemmon	Mount Lemmon Survey	·	2.1 km	MPC · JPL
759109	2007 RA_{368}	—	September 13, 2007	Mount Lemmon	Mount Lemmon Survey	·	2.3 km	MPC · JPL
759110	2007 RG_{368}	—	September 13, 2007	Catalina	CSS	·	1.7 km	MPC · JPL
759111	2007 RP_{368}	—	September 12, 2007	Mount Lemmon	Mount Lemmon Survey	3:2	3.4 km	MPC · JPL
759112	2007 RM_{369}	—	September 10, 2007	Mount Lemmon	Mount Lemmon Survey	·	1.9 km	MPC · JPL
759113	2007 RX_{370}	—	September 13, 2007	Kitt Peak	Spacewatch	·	2.1 km	MPC · JPL
759114	2007 RJ_{373}	—	September 14, 2007	Mount Lemmon	Mount Lemmon Survey	ELF	2.6 km	MPC · JPL
759115	2007 RW_{374}	—	September 11, 2007	Mount Lemmon	Mount Lemmon Survey	THM	1.7 km	MPC · JPL
759116	2007 RM_{376}	—	September 13, 2007	Mount Lemmon	Mount Lemmon Survey	EOS	1.5 km	MPC · JPL
759117	2007 RZ_{378}	—	September 14, 2007	Mount Lemmon	Mount Lemmon Survey	·	2.0 km	MPC · JPL
759118	2007 RH_{379}	—	August 24, 2007	Kitt Peak	Spacewatch	·	1.7 km	MPC · JPL
759119	2007 RW_{380}	—	September 14, 2007	Mount Lemmon	Mount Lemmon Survey	EOS	1.4 km	MPC · JPL
759120	2007 RB_{381}	—	November 7, 2013	Mount Lemmon	Mount Lemmon Survey	·	1.9 km	MPC · JPL
759121	2007 RK_{381}	—	September 15, 2007	Kitt Peak	Spacewatch	HYG	1.9 km	MPC · JPL
759122	2007 RV_{383}	—	September 13, 2007	Kitt Peak	Spacewatch	·	1.9 km	MPC · JPL
759123	2007 RO_{384}	—	September 13, 2007	Mount Lemmon	Mount Lemmon Survey	·	2.1 km	MPC · JPL
759124	2007 RH_{385}	—	September 13, 2007	Mount Lemmon	Mount Lemmon Survey	·	2.3 km	MPC · JPL
759125	2007 SG_{10}	—	September 10, 2007	Mount Lemmon	Mount Lemmon Survey	·	500 m	MPC · JPL
759126	2007 SP_{10}	—	September 11, 2007	Catalina	CSS	·	620 m	MPC · JPL
759127	2007 SZ_{18}	—	September 25, 2007	Mount Lemmon	Mount Lemmon Survey	THM	1.6 km	MPC · JPL
759128	2007 SU_{24}	—	September 19, 2007	Kitt Peak	Spacewatch	·	2.1 km	MPC · JPL
759129	2007 SN_{26}	—	August 2, 2011	Haleakala	Pan-STARRS 1	EUN	760 m	MPC · JPL
759130	2007 SZ_{26}	—	March 16, 2016	Haleakala	Pan-STARRS 1	·	2.2 km	MPC · JPL
759131	2007 SL_{27}	—	September 18, 2007	Mount Lemmon	Mount Lemmon Survey	MAR	710 m	MPC · JPL
759132	2007 SS_{27}	—	January 17, 2015	Haleakala	Pan-STARRS 1	·	2.4 km	MPC · JPL
759133	2007 SX_{27}	—	September 18, 2007	Kitt Peak	Spacewatch	·	2.2 km	MPC · JPL
759134	2007 SH_{28}	—	September 18, 2007	Kitt Peak	Spacewatch	·	2.3 km	MPC · JPL
759135	2007 SL_{28}	—	September 19, 2007	Kitt Peak	Spacewatch	·	1.9 km	MPC · JPL
759136	2007 SX_{28}	—	September 19, 2007	Kitt Peak	Spacewatch	EOS	1.3 km	MPC · JPL
759137	2007 TH_{5}	—	September 12, 2007	Mount Lemmon	Mount Lemmon Survey	·	1.8 km	MPC · JPL
759138	2007 TF_{19}	—	September 10, 2007	Mount Lemmon	Mount Lemmon Survey	·	1.9 km	MPC · JPL
759139	2007 TY_{22}	—	October 8, 2007	Mount Lemmon	Mount Lemmon Survey	·	1.1 km	MPC · JPL
759140	2007 TJ_{27}	—	October 4, 2007	Kitt Peak	Spacewatch	·	1.9 km	MPC · JPL
759141	2007 TH_{37}	—	October 4, 2007	Catalina	CSS	·	440 m	MPC · JPL
759142	2007 TT_{47}	—	October 4, 2007	Kitt Peak	Spacewatch	·	970 m	MPC · JPL
759143	2007 TL_{53}	—	October 4, 2007	Kitt Peak	Spacewatch	THM	1.6 km	MPC · JPL
759144	2007 TM_{54}	—	October 4, 2007	Kitt Peak	Spacewatch	EUP	2.2 km	MPC · JPL
759145	2007 TV_{56}	—	October 4, 2007	Kitt Peak	Spacewatch	·	1.9 km	MPC · JPL
759146	2007 TQ_{59}	—	February 4, 2005	Kitt Peak	Spacewatch	MAS	560 m	MPC · JPL
759147	2007 TZ_{59}	—	October 5, 2007	Kitt Peak	Spacewatch	·	1.9 km	MPC · JPL
759148	2007 TS_{62}	—	January 27, 2012	Mount Lemmon	Mount Lemmon Survey	·	570 m	MPC · JPL
759149	2007 TU_{63}	—	September 13, 2007	Mount Lemmon	Mount Lemmon Survey	·	530 m	MPC · JPL
759150	2007 TN_{69}	—	September 20, 2007	Catalina	CSS	(5)	1.1 km	MPC · JPL
759151	2007 TK_{75}	—	September 9, 2007	Kitt Peak	Spacewatch	·	2.1 km	MPC · JPL
759152	2007 TK_{81}	—	September 11, 2007	Mount Lemmon	Mount Lemmon Survey	HYG	2.0 km	MPC · JPL
759153	2007 TJ_{82}	—	August 10, 2007	Kitt Peak	Spacewatch	·	510 m	MPC · JPL
759154	2007 TA_{85}	—	October 8, 2007	Mount Lemmon	Mount Lemmon Survey	(5)	830 m	MPC · JPL
759155	2007 TZ_{89}	—	October 8, 2007	Mount Lemmon	Mount Lemmon Survey	3:2	4.0 km	MPC · JPL
759156	2007 TJ_{92}	—	October 5, 2007	Kitt Peak	Spacewatch	·	1.6 km	MPC · JPL
759157	2007 TQ_{96}	—	September 9, 2007	Mount Lemmon	Mount Lemmon Survey	VER	2.0 km	MPC · JPL
759158	2007 TX_{96}	—	September 13, 2007	Mount Lemmon	Mount Lemmon Survey	·	2.1 km	MPC · JPL
759159	2007 TP_{103}	—	September 15, 2007	Mount Lemmon	Mount Lemmon Survey	·	1.3 km	MPC · JPL
759160	2007 TW_{118}	—	October 9, 2007	Mount Lemmon	Mount Lemmon Survey	VER	2.1 km	MPC · JPL
759161	2007 TC_{138}	—	October 8, 2007	Mount Lemmon	Mount Lemmon Survey	·	980 m	MPC · JPL
759162	2007 TF_{140}	—	October 9, 2007	Mount Lemmon	Mount Lemmon Survey	MAS	580 m	MPC · JPL
759163	2007 TD_{141}	—	October 9, 2007	Mount Lemmon	Mount Lemmon Survey	·	1.9 km	MPC · JPL
759164	2007 TS_{141}	—	October 9, 2007	Mount Lemmon	Mount Lemmon Survey	·	530 m	MPC · JPL
759165	2007 TX_{168}	—	May 31, 2006	Mount Lemmon	Mount Lemmon Survey	·	1.9 km	MPC · JPL
759166	2007 TK_{169}	—	September 11, 2007	Catalina	CSS	·	1.6 km	MPC · JPL
759167	2007 TA_{179}	—	September 11, 2007	Mount Lemmon	Mount Lemmon Survey	THM	2.0 km	MPC · JPL
759168	2007 TC_{180}	—	October 7, 2007	Mount Lemmon	Mount Lemmon Survey	THM	1.6 km	MPC · JPL
759169	2007 TQ_{184}	—	September 13, 2007	Kitt Peak	Spacewatch	·	2.1 km	MPC · JPL
759170	2007 TG_{192}	—	October 5, 2007	Kitt Peak	Spacewatch	·	1.8 km	MPC · JPL
759171	2007 TG_{199}	—	October 8, 2007	Kitt Peak	Spacewatch	·	2.2 km	MPC · JPL
759172	2007 TL_{201}	—	September 15, 2007	Mount Lemmon	Mount Lemmon Survey	·	2.4 km	MPC · JPL
759173	2007 TO_{202}	—	September 15, 2007	Mount Lemmon	Mount Lemmon Survey	·	530 m	MPC · JPL
759174	2007 TU_{203}	—	October 8, 2007	Mount Lemmon	Mount Lemmon Survey	VER	2.1 km	MPC · JPL
759175	2007 TV_{203}	—	October 8, 2007	Mount Lemmon	Mount Lemmon Survey	·	2.3 km	MPC · JPL
759176	2007 TA_{208}	—	October 10, 2007	Mount Lemmon	Mount Lemmon Survey	·	2.0 km	MPC · JPL
759177	2007 TE_{211}	—	October 7, 2007	Kitt Peak	Spacewatch	·	850 m	MPC · JPL
759178	2007 TB_{220}	—	October 8, 2007	Mount Lemmon	Mount Lemmon Survey	EOS	1.5 km	MPC · JPL
759179	2007 TL_{223}	—	September 11, 2007	Mount Lemmon	Mount Lemmon Survey	·	500 m	MPC · JPL
759180	2007 TJ_{231}	—	October 8, 2007	Mount Lemmon	Mount Lemmon Survey	·	1.1 km	MPC · JPL
759181	2007 TY_{233}	—	October 8, 2007	Kitt Peak	Spacewatch	·	1.9 km	MPC · JPL
759182	2007 TR_{235}	—	October 9, 2007	Mount Lemmon	Mount Lemmon Survey	·	520 m	MPC · JPL
759183	2007 TK_{236}	—	October 9, 2007	Mount Lemmon	Mount Lemmon Survey	·	1.8 km	MPC · JPL
759184	2007 TE_{239}	—	October 10, 2007	Mount Lemmon	Mount Lemmon Survey	·	1.0 km	MPC · JPL
759185	2007 TF_{249}	—	October 11, 2007	Mount Lemmon	Mount Lemmon Survey	·	1.3 km	MPC · JPL
759186	2007 TS_{274}	—	September 10, 2007	Mount Lemmon	Mount Lemmon Survey	·	2.0 km	MPC · JPL
759187	2007 TV_{283}	—	October 8, 2007	Mount Lemmon	Mount Lemmon Survey	·	2.3 km	MPC · JPL
759188	2007 TZ_{284}	—	October 9, 2007	Mount Lemmon	Mount Lemmon Survey	THM	1.6 km	MPC · JPL
759189	2007 TC_{292}	—	September 9, 2007	Mount Lemmon	Mount Lemmon Survey	HYG	2.1 km	MPC · JPL
759190	2007 TJ_{293}	—	September 12, 2007	Kitt Peak	Spacewatch	·	2.2 km	MPC · JPL
759191	2007 TP_{296}	—	January 16, 2005	Mauna Kea	Veillet, C.	·	450 m	MPC · JPL
759192	2007 TJ_{302}	—	October 12, 2007	Kitt Peak	Spacewatch	·	430 m	MPC · JPL
759193	2007 TN_{304}	—	October 12, 2007	Mount Lemmon	Mount Lemmon Survey	·	1.1 km	MPC · JPL
759194	2007 TW_{308}	—	September 15, 2007	Kitt Peak	Spacewatch	·	480 m	MPC · JPL
759195	2007 TB_{309}	—	September 13, 2007	Mount Lemmon	Mount Lemmon Survey	·	2.1 km	MPC · JPL
759196	2007 TE_{309}	—	October 10, 2007	Mount Lemmon	Mount Lemmon Survey	3:2 · SHU	3.4 km	MPC · JPL
759197	2007 TO_{310}	—	March 11, 2005	Mount Lemmon	Mount Lemmon Survey	·	1.1 km	MPC · JPL
759198	2007 TJ_{314}	—	October 11, 2007	Mount Lemmon	Mount Lemmon Survey	·	1.7 km	MPC · JPL
759199	2007 TC_{315}	—	October 4, 2007	Kitt Peak	Spacewatch	THM	1.8 km	MPC · JPL
759200	2007 TP_{319}	—	October 12, 2007	Kitt Peak	Spacewatch	THM	1.7 km	MPC · JPL

== 759201–759300 ==
back to top

Designation			Discovery			Properties		Ref
Permanent	Provisional	Named after	Date	Site	Discoverer(s)	Category	Diam.	Ref
759201	2007 TQ_{326}	—	October 11, 2007	Kitt Peak	Spacewatch	·	430 m	MPC · JPL
759202	2007 TB_{329}	—	October 11, 2007	Kitt Peak	Spacewatch	·	1.9 km	MPC · JPL
759203	2007 TG_{332}	—	October 11, 2007	Kitt Peak	Spacewatch	·	500 m	MPC · JPL
759204	2007 TZ_{338}	—	October 15, 2007	Kitt Peak	Spacewatch	·	530 m	MPC · JPL
759205	2007 TG_{340}	—	October 8, 2007	Mount Lemmon	Mount Lemmon Survey	·	2.3 km	MPC · JPL
759206	2007 TH_{341}	—	October 9, 2007	Mount Lemmon	Mount Lemmon Survey	·	700 m	MPC · JPL
759207	2007 TW_{342}	—	October 10, 2007	Mount Lemmon	Mount Lemmon Survey	·	840 m	MPC · JPL
759208	2007 TW_{344}	—	October 11, 2007	Mount Lemmon	Mount Lemmon Survey	THM	1.8 km	MPC · JPL
759209	2007 TM_{346}	—	October 13, 2007	Mount Lemmon	Mount Lemmon Survey	EOS	1.4 km	MPC · JPL
759210	2007 TC_{358}	—	October 15, 2007	Mount Lemmon	Mount Lemmon Survey	·	2.2 km	MPC · JPL
759211	2007 TO_{360}	—	October 15, 2007	Mount Lemmon	Mount Lemmon Survey	·	2.2 km	MPC · JPL
759212	2007 TJ_{365}	—	October 9, 2007	Mount Lemmon	Mount Lemmon Survey	·	1.1 km	MPC · JPL
759213	2007 TU_{365}	—	October 9, 2007	Mount Lemmon	Mount Lemmon Survey	THM	1.7 km	MPC · JPL
759214	2007 TJ_{372}	—	September 13, 2007	Mount Lemmon	Mount Lemmon Survey	·	2.1 km	MPC · JPL
759215	2007 TV_{375}	—	September 9, 2007	Kitt Peak	Spacewatch	EOS	1.4 km	MPC · JPL
759216	2007 TO_{376}	—	October 10, 2007	Catalina	CSS	·	1.2 km	MPC · JPL
759217	2007 TT_{381}	—	October 14, 2007	Kitt Peak	Spacewatch	·	1.9 km	MPC · JPL
759218	2007 TP_{387}	—	September 11, 2007	Mount Lemmon	Mount Lemmon Survey	·	2.1 km	MPC · JPL
759219	2007 TL_{389}	—	October 13, 2007	Catalina	CSS	·	560 m	MPC · JPL
759220	2007 TL_{391}	—	October 4, 2007	Kitt Peak	Spacewatch	BRG	1.0 km	MPC · JPL
759221	2007 TE_{395}	—	October 15, 2007	Kitt Peak	Spacewatch	·	2.4 km	MPC · JPL
759222	2007 TR_{396}	—	October 15, 2007	Kitt Peak	Spacewatch	·	2.6 km	MPC · JPL
759223	2007 TL_{403}	—	October 15, 2007	Kitt Peak	Spacewatch	·	1.8 km	MPC · JPL
759224	2007 TO_{408}	—	October 14, 2007	Mount Lemmon	Mount Lemmon Survey	V	450 m	MPC · JPL
759225	2007 TR_{412}	—	October 14, 2007	Črni Vrh	Skvarč, J.	·	1.1 km	MPC · JPL
759226	2007 TF_{420}	—	September 15, 2007	Catalina	CSS	·	2.0 km	MPC · JPL
759227	2007 TP_{423}	—	October 6, 2007	Kitt Peak	Spacewatch	THM	1.9 km	MPC · JPL
759228	2007 TU_{423}	—	October 6, 2007	Kitt Peak	Spacewatch	·	1.4 km	MPC · JPL
759229	2007 TF_{431}	—	October 12, 2007	Kitt Peak	Spacewatch	·	2.1 km	MPC · JPL
759230	2007 TF_{432}	—	October 4, 2007	Kitt Peak	Spacewatch	·	1.5 km	MPC · JPL
759231	2007 TJ_{434}	—	October 8, 2007	Mount Lemmon	Mount Lemmon Survey	·	860 m	MPC · JPL
759232	2007 TM_{445}	—	September 12, 2007	Mount Lemmon	Mount Lemmon Survey	·	550 m	MPC · JPL
759233	2007 TU_{449}	—	October 10, 2007	Mount Lemmon	Mount Lemmon Survey	·	1.2 km	MPC · JPL
759234	2007 TL_{451}	—	October 15, 2007	Kitt Peak	Spacewatch	·	480 m	MPC · JPL
759235	2007 TF_{455}	—	October 10, 2007	Mount Lemmon	Mount Lemmon Survey	·	1.4 km	MPC · JPL
759236	2007 TF_{456}	—	October 15, 2007	Mount Lemmon	Mount Lemmon Survey	·	1.3 km	MPC · JPL
759237	2007 TS_{456}	—	May 7, 2002	Kitt Peak	Spacewatch	·	900 m	MPC · JPL
759238	2007 TO_{457}	—	October 9, 2007	Mount Lemmon	Mount Lemmon Survey	·	450 m	MPC · JPL
759239	2007 TB_{458}	—	October 10, 2007	Mount Lemmon	Mount Lemmon Survey	·	470 m	MPC · JPL
759240	2007 TM_{460}	—	October 13, 2007	Kitt Peak	Spacewatch	·	620 m	MPC · JPL
759241	2007 TD_{462}	—	May 23, 2014	Haleakala	Pan-STARRS 1	·	1 km	MPC · JPL
759242	2007 TJ_{463}	—	October 9, 2007	Kitt Peak	Spacewatch	·	2.1 km	MPC · JPL
759243	2007 TE_{465}	—	March 24, 2014	Haleakala	Pan-STARRS 1	MAR	720 m	MPC · JPL
759244	2007 TF_{467}	—	September 24, 2017	Haleakala	Pan-STARRS 1	·	540 m	MPC · JPL
759245	2007 TN_{467}	—	October 23, 2013	Haleakala	Pan-STARRS 1	·	2.6 km	MPC · JPL
759246	2007 TC_{469}	—	October 11, 2007	Mount Lemmon	Mount Lemmon Survey	·	2.4 km	MPC · JPL
759247	2007 TM_{469}	—	October 10, 2007	Mount Lemmon	Mount Lemmon Survey	·	2.6 km	MPC · JPL
759248	2007 TU_{469}	—	April 2, 2011	Kitt Peak	Spacewatch	·	2.6 km	MPC · JPL
759249	2007 TY_{469}	—	October 15, 2007	Mount Lemmon	Mount Lemmon Survey	·	2.1 km	MPC · JPL
759250	2007 TZ_{469}	—	November 27, 2013	Haleakala	Pan-STARRS 1	·	2.6 km	MPC · JPL
759251	2007 TF_{470}	—	August 14, 2015	Haleakala	Pan-STARRS 1	·	1.2 km	MPC · JPL
759252	2007 TH_{471}	—	September 5, 2013	Kitt Peak	Spacewatch	VER	2.1 km	MPC · JPL
759253	2007 TU_{471}	—	November 11, 2013	Kitt Peak	Spacewatch	VER	2.3 km	MPC · JPL
759254	2007 TW_{471}	—	October 15, 2007	Mount Lemmon	Mount Lemmon Survey	VER	2.2 km	MPC · JPL
759255	2007 TK_{472}	—	October 11, 2007	Kitt Peak	Spacewatch	·	2.2 km	MPC · JPL
759256	2007 TN_{472}	—	September 14, 2007	Mount Lemmon	Mount Lemmon Survey	·	1.9 km	MPC · JPL
759257	2007 TW_{472}	—	September 12, 2007	Kitt Peak	Spacewatch	·	2.0 km	MPC · JPL
759258	2007 TJ_{473}	—	October 8, 2007	Mount Lemmon	Mount Lemmon Survey	·	2.4 km	MPC · JPL
759259	2007 TO_{473}	—	October 15, 2007	Kitt Peak	Spacewatch	(1298)	1.9 km	MPC · JPL
759260	2007 TB_{474}	—	September 6, 2015	Kitt Peak	Spacewatch	(5)	790 m	MPC · JPL
759261	2007 TG_{474}	—	October 7, 2007	Mount Lemmon	Mount Lemmon Survey	·	1.3 km	MPC · JPL
759262	2007 TN_{474}	—	September 8, 2015	XuYi	PMO NEO Survey Program	·	1.4 km	MPC · JPL
759263	2007 TV_{474}	—	October 9, 2007	Mount Lemmon	Mount Lemmon Survey	·	1.3 km	MPC · JPL
759264	2007 TW_{474}	—	March 3, 2009	Kitt Peak	Spacewatch	·	1.1 km	MPC · JPL
759265	2007 TV_{475}	—	July 27, 2017	Haleakala	Pan-STARRS 1	·	1.6 km	MPC · JPL
759266	2007 TG_{477}	—	September 12, 2007	Mount Lemmon	Mount Lemmon Survey	·	2.2 km	MPC · JPL
759267	2007 TV_{477}	—	January 30, 2015	Haleakala	Pan-STARRS 1	T_{j} (2.98) · EUP	2.7 km	MPC · JPL
759268	2007 TA_{478}	—	October 8, 2007	Mount Lemmon	Mount Lemmon Survey	·	2.2 km	MPC · JPL
759269	2007 TJ_{478}	—	October 12, 2007	Mount Lemmon	Mount Lemmon Survey	·	2.5 km	MPC · JPL
759270	2007 TU_{478}	—	July 12, 2018	Haleakala	Pan-STARRS 1	·	2.1 km	MPC · JPL
759271	2007 TY_{478}	—	January 18, 2015	Mount Lemmon	Mount Lemmon Survey	·	2.2 km	MPC · JPL
759272	2007 TA_{479}	—	April 4, 2011	Kitt Peak	Spacewatch	·	1.9 km	MPC · JPL
759273	2007 TX_{479}	—	October 12, 2007	Kitt Peak	Spacewatch	·	2.1 km	MPC · JPL
759274	2007 TE_{481}	—	October 14, 2007	Mount Lemmon	Mount Lemmon Survey	MRX	820 m	MPC · JPL
759275	2007 TY_{481}	—	October 10, 2007	Kitt Peak	Spacewatch	EOS	1.4 km	MPC · JPL
759276	2007 TG_{482}	—	October 11, 2007	Mount Lemmon	Mount Lemmon Survey	·	2.2 km	MPC · JPL
759277	2007 TO_{482}	—	October 12, 2007	Kitt Peak	Spacewatch	EOS	1.4 km	MPC · JPL
759278	2007 TP_{482}	—	October 12, 2007	Kitt Peak	Spacewatch	·	1.0 km	MPC · JPL
759279	2007 TT_{482}	—	October 8, 2007	Mount Lemmon	Mount Lemmon Survey	·	1.0 km	MPC · JPL
759280	2007 TY_{482}	—	October 13, 2007	Mount Lemmon	Mount Lemmon Survey	·	540 m	MPC · JPL
759281	2007 TD_{484}	—	October 12, 2007	Mount Lemmon	Mount Lemmon Survey	·	1.1 km	MPC · JPL
759282	2007 TX_{484}	—	October 12, 2007	Mount Lemmon	Mount Lemmon Survey	·	590 m	MPC · JPL
759283	2007 TK_{485}	—	October 12, 2007	Mount Lemmon	Mount Lemmon Survey	·	2.7 km	MPC · JPL
759284	2007 TL_{485}	—	October 13, 2007	Kitt Peak	Spacewatch	THM	1.6 km	MPC · JPL
759285	2007 TN_{485}	—	October 12, 2007	Mount Lemmon	Mount Lemmon Survey	·	2.4 km	MPC · JPL
759286	2007 TF_{486}	—	October 10, 2007	Kitt Peak	Spacewatch	(5)	900 m	MPC · JPL
759287	2007 TH_{486}	—	October 10, 2007	Mount Lemmon	Mount Lemmon Survey	·	1.2 km	MPC · JPL
759288	2007 TN_{486}	—	October 9, 2007	Mount Lemmon	Mount Lemmon Survey	·	2.1 km	MPC · JPL
759289	2007 TB_{488}	—	October 10, 2007	Mount Lemmon	Mount Lemmon Survey	·	1.3 km	MPC · JPL
759290	2007 TX_{489}	—	October 14, 2007	Mount Lemmon	Mount Lemmon Survey	·	1.8 km	MPC · JPL
759291	2007 TO_{492}	—	October 10, 2007	Mount Lemmon	Mount Lemmon Survey	MIS	1.8 km	MPC · JPL
759292	2007 TJ_{493}	—	October 8, 2007	Mount Lemmon	Mount Lemmon Survey	·	1.6 km	MPC · JPL
759293	2007 TR_{493}	—	October 7, 2007	Mount Lemmon	Mount Lemmon Survey	·	2.5 km	MPC · JPL
759294	2007 TO_{494}	—	October 9, 2007	Mount Lemmon	Mount Lemmon Survey	·	2.0 km	MPC · JPL
759295	2007 TV_{494}	—	October 15, 2007	Mount Lemmon	Mount Lemmon Survey	·	770 m	MPC · JPL
759296	2007 TA_{495}	—	October 11, 2007	Kitt Peak	Spacewatch	·	2.0 km	MPC · JPL
759297	2007 TC_{495}	—	October 9, 2007	Mount Lemmon	Mount Lemmon Survey	·	530 m	MPC · JPL
759298	2007 TL_{495}	—	October 9, 2007	Mount Lemmon	Mount Lemmon Survey	·	2.2 km	MPC · JPL
759299	2007 TM_{495}	—	October 12, 2007	Mount Lemmon	Mount Lemmon Survey	VER	2.0 km	MPC · JPL
759300	2007 TR_{495}	—	October 9, 2007	Kitt Peak	Spacewatch	·	450 m	MPC · JPL

== 759301–759400 ==
back to top

Designation			Discovery			Properties		Ref
Permanent	Provisional	Named after	Date	Site	Discoverer(s)	Category	Diam.	Ref
759301	2007 TS_{495}	—	September 21, 2001	Apache Point	SDSS	·	2.3 km	MPC · JPL
759302	2007 TW_{495}	—	October 10, 2007	Mount Lemmon	Mount Lemmon Survey	·	1.9 km	MPC · JPL
759303	2007 TG_{497}	—	October 9, 2007	Mount Lemmon	Mount Lemmon Survey	EOS	1.4 km	MPC · JPL
759304	2007 TN_{497}	—	October 12, 2007	Mount Lemmon	Mount Lemmon Survey	·	2.2 km	MPC · JPL
759305	2007 TC_{500}	—	October 15, 2007	Kitt Peak	Spacewatch	VER	2.0 km	MPC · JPL
759306	2007 TM_{502}	—	October 11, 2007	Kitt Peak	Spacewatch	VER	2.2 km	MPC · JPL
759307	2007 TA_{504}	—	October 7, 2007	Mount Lemmon	Mount Lemmon Survey	·	440 m	MPC · JPL
759308	2007 TE_{505}	—	October 7, 2007	Mount Lemmon	Mount Lemmon Survey	·	960 m	MPC · JPL
759309	2007 TF_{505}	—	October 12, 2007	Mount Lemmon	Mount Lemmon Survey	·	1.1 km	MPC · JPL
759310	2007 TG_{505}	—	October 13, 2007	Mount Lemmon	Mount Lemmon Survey	·	1.3 km	MPC · JPL
759311	2007 TC_{506}	—	October 10, 2007	Kitt Peak	Spacewatch	3:2	3.7 km	MPC · JPL
759312	2007 TD_{506}	—	October 15, 2007	Mount Lemmon	Mount Lemmon Survey	·	2.2 km	MPC · JPL
759313	2007 TG_{507}	—	October 12, 2007	Mount Lemmon	Mount Lemmon Survey	VER	1.9 km	MPC · JPL
759314	2007 TM_{507}	—	October 12, 2007	Kitt Peak	Spacewatch	EUN	950 m	MPC · JPL
759315	2007 TB_{508}	—	October 8, 2007	Kitt Peak	Spacewatch	·	1.9 km	MPC · JPL
759316	2007 TU_{512}	—	October 7, 2007	Mount Lemmon	Mount Lemmon Survey	·	2.0 km	MPC · JPL
759317	2007 UE_{5}	—	October 10, 2007	Kitt Peak	Spacewatch	·	600 m	MPC · JPL
759318	2007 UM_{20}	—	October 18, 2007	Mount Lemmon	Mount Lemmon Survey	·	2.0 km	MPC · JPL
759319	2007 UT_{22}	—	October 7, 2007	Mount Lemmon	Mount Lemmon Survey	THM	1.8 km	MPC · JPL
759320	2007 UV_{22}	—	October 10, 2007	Kitt Peak	Spacewatch	·	1.8 km	MPC · JPL
759321	2007 UL_{23}	—	October 16, 2007	Kitt Peak	Spacewatch	·	1.2 km	MPC · JPL
759322	2007 UH_{29}	—	October 4, 2007	Kitt Peak	Spacewatch	·	980 m	MPC · JPL
759323	2007 UX_{36}	—	October 19, 2007	Catalina	CSS	·	2.2 km	MPC · JPL
759324	2007 UD_{39}	—	October 20, 2007	Mount Lemmon	Mount Lemmon Survey	·	2.4 km	MPC · JPL
759325	2007 UH_{45}	—	October 14, 2007	Kitt Peak	Spacewatch	(1547)	1.1 km	MPC · JPL
759326	2007 UD_{54}	—	October 8, 2007	Mount Lemmon	Mount Lemmon Survey	EUP	2.4 km	MPC · JPL
759327	2007 UK_{55}	—	October 18, 2007	Kitt Peak	Spacewatch	·	1.6 km	MPC · JPL
759328	2007 UA_{60}	—	October 16, 2007	Mount Lemmon	Mount Lemmon Survey	·	970 m	MPC · JPL
759329	2007 UN_{62}	—	October 13, 2007	Catalina	CSS	·	1.7 km	MPC · JPL
759330	2007 UA_{65}	—	October 30, 2007	Mount Lemmon	Mount Lemmon Survey	EOS	1.5 km	MPC · JPL
759331	2007 UG_{67}	—	October 18, 2007	Mount Lemmon	Mount Lemmon Survey	·	1.8 km	MPC · JPL
759332	2007 UV_{67}	—	September 12, 2007	Mount Lemmon	Mount Lemmon Survey	·	2.3 km	MPC · JPL
759333	2007 UE_{76}	—	October 31, 2007	Mount Lemmon	Mount Lemmon Survey	·	560 m	MPC · JPL
759334	2007 UC_{89}	—	October 19, 2007	Kitt Peak	Spacewatch	·	2.5 km	MPC · JPL
759335	2007 UH_{89}	—	September 22, 2001	Kitt Peak	Spacewatch	THM	1.7 km	MPC · JPL
759336	2007 UU_{92}	—	October 31, 2007	Mount Lemmon	Mount Lemmon Survey	·	2.3 km	MPC · JPL
759337	2007 UR_{99}	—	September 18, 2007	Mount Lemmon	Mount Lemmon Survey	·	500 m	MPC · JPL
759338	2007 UB_{102}	—	October 30, 2007	Kitt Peak	Spacewatch	·	720 m	MPC · JPL
759339	2007 UF_{108}	—	October 11, 2007	Kitt Peak	Spacewatch	·	2.4 km	MPC · JPL
759340	2007 UM_{110}	—	October 14, 2007	Kitt Peak	Spacewatch	·	520 m	MPC · JPL
759341	2007 UB_{112}	—	October 30, 2007	Mount Lemmon	Mount Lemmon Survey	·	2.4 km	MPC · JPL
759342	2007 UL_{113}	—	October 11, 2007	Kitt Peak	Spacewatch	·	1.2 km	MPC · JPL
759343	2007 UF_{118}	—	October 12, 2007	Kitt Peak	Spacewatch	·	1.7 km	MPC · JPL
759344	2007 UH_{118}	—	October 8, 2007	Kitt Peak	Spacewatch	·	1.0 km	MPC · JPL
759345	2007 UU_{119}	—	October 30, 2007	Mount Lemmon	Mount Lemmon Survey	·	1.1 km	MPC · JPL
759346	2007 UJ_{120}	—	October 9, 2007	Kitt Peak	Spacewatch	·	2.2 km	MPC · JPL
759347	2007 UW_{120}	—	October 30, 2007	Mount Lemmon	Mount Lemmon Survey	·	1.6 km	MPC · JPL
759348	2007 UH_{128}	—	October 20, 2007	Mount Lemmon	Mount Lemmon Survey	MRX	880 m	MPC · JPL
759349	2007 UZ_{131}	—	October 18, 2007	Kitt Peak	Spacewatch	THM	1.8 km	MPC · JPL
759350	2007 UD_{133}	—	October 21, 2007	Mount Lemmon	Mount Lemmon Survey	(5)	850 m	MPC · JPL
759351	2007 UP_{135}	—	October 20, 2007	Mount Lemmon	Mount Lemmon Survey	·	2.3 km	MPC · JPL
759352	2007 UU_{140}	—	October 20, 2007	Mount Lemmon	Mount Lemmon Survey	·	2.0 km	MPC · JPL
759353	2007 UB_{141}	—	October 21, 2007	Mount Lemmon	Mount Lemmon Survey	·	2.6 km	MPC · JPL
759354	2007 UJ_{145}	—	October 24, 2007	Mount Lemmon	Mount Lemmon Survey	·	520 m	MPC · JPL
759355	2007 UM_{146}	—	October 18, 2007	Mount Lemmon	Mount Lemmon Survey	·	1.1 km	MPC · JPL
759356	2007 UY_{146}	—	April 4, 2014	Haleakala	Pan-STARRS 1	·	1.3 km	MPC · JPL
759357	2007 UB_{150}	—	October 19, 2007	Mount Lemmon	Mount Lemmon Survey	·	1.4 km	MPC · JPL
759358	2007 UN_{150}	—	August 25, 2001	Kitt Peak	Spacewatch	THM	1.8 km	MPC · JPL
759359	2007 UT_{150}	—	October 16, 2007	Mount Lemmon	Mount Lemmon Survey	·	2.0 km	MPC · JPL
759360	2007 UV_{150}	—	April 1, 2016	Haleakala	Pan-STARRS 1	·	2.2 km	MPC · JPL
759361	2007 UH_{151}	—	October 20, 2007	Mount Lemmon	Mount Lemmon Survey	EOS	1.4 km	MPC · JPL
759362	2007 UM_{151}	—	October 30, 2007	Kitt Peak	Spacewatch	·	2.1 km	MPC · JPL
759363	2007 UH_{152}	—	October 16, 2007	Mount Lemmon	Mount Lemmon Survey	·	2.3 km	MPC · JPL
759364	2007 UX_{152}	—	February 26, 2014	Haleakala	Pan-STARRS 1	·	900 m	MPC · JPL
759365	2007 UD_{154}	—	October 16, 2007	Kitt Peak	Spacewatch	·	2.0 km	MPC · JPL
759366	2007 UT_{154}	—	March 13, 2015	Mount Lemmon	Mount Lemmon Survey	·	2.9 km	MPC · JPL
759367	2007 UA_{155}	—	October 21, 2007	Kitt Peak	Spacewatch	LIX	2.5 km	MPC · JPL
759368	2007 UR_{155}	—	October 20, 2007	Kitt Peak	Spacewatch	·	1.8 km	MPC · JPL
759369	2007 UZ_{155}	—	October 30, 2007	Kitt Peak	Spacewatch	·	980 m	MPC · JPL
759370	2007 UB_{156}	—	October 21, 2007	Mount Lemmon	Mount Lemmon Survey	·	1.8 km	MPC · JPL
759371	2007 UC_{156}	—	October 30, 2007	Mount Lemmon	Mount Lemmon Survey	·	2.2 km	MPC · JPL
759372	2007 UH_{156}	—	October 20, 2007	Mount Lemmon	Mount Lemmon Survey	EUP	2.5 km	MPC · JPL
759373	2007 UE_{157}	—	October 21, 2007	Mount Lemmon	Mount Lemmon Survey	·	2.4 km	MPC · JPL
759374	2007 UH_{157}	—	October 20, 2007	Mount Lemmon	Mount Lemmon Survey	·	2.2 km	MPC · JPL
759375	2007 UW_{157}	—	October 20, 2007	Mount Lemmon	Mount Lemmon Survey	EOS	1.3 km	MPC · JPL
759376	2007 UJ_{160}	—	October 18, 2007	Kitt Peak	Spacewatch	·	1.2 km	MPC · JPL
759377	2007 UN_{160}	—	October 20, 2007	Mount Lemmon	Mount Lemmon Survey	·	800 m	MPC · JPL
759378	2007 UO_{160}	—	October 20, 2007	Mount Lemmon	Mount Lemmon Survey	·	910 m	MPC · JPL
759379	2007 UV_{160}	—	October 19, 2003	Kitt Peak	Spacewatch	HNS	820 m	MPC · JPL
759380	2007 UX_{160}	—	October 20, 2007	Mount Lemmon	Mount Lemmon Survey	EOS	1.6 km	MPC · JPL
759381	2007 UD_{161}	—	October 16, 2007	Kitt Peak	Spacewatch	EUN	940 m	MPC · JPL
759382	2007 UR_{163}	—	October 20, 2007	Kitt Peak	Spacewatch	·	2.2 km	MPC · JPL
759383	2007 VP_{5}	—	November 2, 2007	Catalina	CSS	·	2.1 km	MPC · JPL
759384	2007 VU_{14}	—	November 1, 2007	Kitt Peak	Spacewatch	·	1.7 km	MPC · JPL
759385	2007 VR_{17}	—	November 1, 2007	Mount Lemmon	Mount Lemmon Survey	·	2.4 km	MPC · JPL
759386	2007 VP_{18}	—	October 7, 2007	Mount Lemmon	Mount Lemmon Survey	·	2.4 km	MPC · JPL
759387	2007 VQ_{20}	—	September 13, 2007	Mount Lemmon	Mount Lemmon Survey	THM	1.8 km	MPC · JPL
759388	2007 VV_{21}	—	October 12, 2007	Kitt Peak	Spacewatch	·	1.9 km	MPC · JPL
759389	2007 VA_{22}	—	October 12, 2007	Mount Lemmon	Mount Lemmon Survey	BRG	1.0 km	MPC · JPL
759390	2007 VM_{22}	—	October 12, 2007	Mount Lemmon	Mount Lemmon Survey	·	1.9 km	MPC · JPL
759391	2007 VO_{23}	—	October 8, 2007	Kitt Peak	Spacewatch	·	1.2 km	MPC · JPL
759392	2007 VY_{23}	—	November 2, 2007	Mount Lemmon	Mount Lemmon Survey	·	1.5 km	MPC · JPL
759393	2007 VZ_{23}	—	October 8, 2007	Mount Lemmon	Mount Lemmon Survey	·	1.0 km	MPC · JPL
759394	2007 VJ_{24}	—	November 2, 2007	Mount Lemmon	Mount Lemmon Survey	HNS	660 m	MPC · JPL
759395	2007 VN_{26}	—	November 2, 2007	Mount Lemmon	Mount Lemmon Survey	·	2.6 km	MPC · JPL
759396	2007 VW_{26}	—	November 2, 2007	Mount Lemmon	Mount Lemmon Survey	·	550 m	MPC · JPL
759397	2007 VS_{27}	—	November 2, 2007	Mount Lemmon	Mount Lemmon Survey	V	390 m	MPC · JPL
759398	2007 VV_{31}	—	November 2, 2007	Kitt Peak	Spacewatch	MAR	740 m	MPC · JPL
759399	2007 VL_{38}	—	November 2, 2007	Mount Lemmon	Mount Lemmon Survey	·	2.3 km	MPC · JPL
759400	2007 VW_{39}	—	October 19, 2007	Kitt Peak	Spacewatch	(1547)	980 m	MPC · JPL

== 759401–759500 ==
back to top

Designation			Discovery			Properties		Ref
Permanent	Provisional	Named after	Date	Site	Discoverer(s)	Category	Diam.	Ref
759401	2007 VY_{41}	—	October 8, 2007	Kitt Peak	Spacewatch	·	1.2 km	MPC · JPL
759402	2007 VJ_{55}	—	November 1, 2007	Kitt Peak	Spacewatch	·	1.9 km	MPC · JPL
759403	2007 VE_{57}	—	October 20, 2007	Mount Lemmon	Mount Lemmon Survey	·	1.9 km	MPC · JPL
759404	2007 VY_{65}	—	November 2, 2007	Mount Lemmon	Mount Lemmon Survey	·	940 m	MPC · JPL
759405	2007 VK_{70}	—	October 8, 2007	Mount Lemmon	Mount Lemmon Survey	·	1.7 km	MPC · JPL
759406	2007 VT_{73}	—	November 2, 2007	Kitt Peak	Spacewatch	·	1.2 km	MPC · JPL
759407	2007 VQ_{76}	—	November 3, 2007	Kitt Peak	Spacewatch	·	1.9 km	MPC · JPL
759408	2007 VG_{79}	—	November 3, 2007	Kitt Peak	Spacewatch	VER	2.0 km	MPC · JPL
759409	2007 VB_{81}	—	November 4, 2007	Kitt Peak	Spacewatch	·	2.3 km	MPC · JPL
759410	2007 VM_{89}	—	October 10, 2007	Mount Lemmon	Mount Lemmon Survey	·	2.9 km	MPC · JPL
759411	2007 VQ_{96}	—	October 10, 2007	Mount Lemmon	Mount Lemmon Survey	·	2.2 km	MPC · JPL
759412	2007 VJ_{97}	—	October 9, 2007	Kitt Peak	Spacewatch	·	2.4 km	MPC · JPL
759413	2007 VK_{97}	—	October 16, 2007	Mount Lemmon	Mount Lemmon Survey	(5)	770 m	MPC · JPL
759414	2007 VZ_{97}	—	November 1, 2007	Kitt Peak	Spacewatch	·	1.3 km	MPC · JPL
759415	2007 VX_{98}	—	November 2, 2007	Mount Lemmon	Mount Lemmon Survey	·	990 m	MPC · JPL
759416	2007 VD_{101}	—	November 2, 2007	Kitt Peak	Spacewatch	·	510 m	MPC · JPL
759417	2007 VV_{104}	—	October 14, 2007	Mount Lemmon	Mount Lemmon Survey	·	2.3 km	MPC · JPL
759418	2007 VM_{108}	—	November 3, 2007	Kitt Peak	Spacewatch	·	2.0 km	MPC · JPL
759419	2007 VX_{109}	—	November 3, 2007	Kitt Peak	Spacewatch	·	1.2 km	MPC · JPL
759420	2007 VW_{121}	—	November 5, 2007	Kitt Peak	Spacewatch	HYG	2.2 km	MPC · JPL
759421	2007 VC_{122}	—	October 18, 2007	Mount Lemmon	Mount Lemmon Survey	VER	2.0 km	MPC · JPL
759422	2007 VO_{122}	—	October 21, 2007	Mount Lemmon	Mount Lemmon Survey	·	2.3 km	MPC · JPL
759423	2007 VO_{129}	—	November 1, 2007	Mount Lemmon	Mount Lemmon Survey	·	2.0 km	MPC · JPL
759424	2007 VA_{131}	—	November 1, 2007	Mount Lemmon	Mount Lemmon Survey	·	2.1 km	MPC · JPL
759425	2007 VY_{131}	—	September 15, 2007	Kitt Peak	Spacewatch	·	2.0 km	MPC · JPL
759426	2007 VA_{132}	—	November 2, 2007	Mount Lemmon	Mount Lemmon Survey	HOF	1.9 km	MPC · JPL
759427	2007 VJ_{140}	—	November 4, 2007	Kitt Peak	Spacewatch	·	890 m	MPC · JPL
759428	2007 VY_{140}	—	October 8, 2007	Kitt Peak	Spacewatch	·	1.3 km	MPC · JPL
759429	2007 VX_{141}	—	October 20, 2007	Mount Lemmon	Mount Lemmon Survey	TIR	2.0 km	MPC · JPL
759430	2007 VA_{142}	—	October 20, 2007	Mount Lemmon	Mount Lemmon Survey	·	1.3 km	MPC · JPL
759431	2007 VL_{144}	—	November 4, 2007	Kitt Peak	Spacewatch	(5)	770 m	MPC · JPL
759432	2007 VV_{144}	—	November 4, 2007	Kitt Peak	Spacewatch	·	1.1 km	MPC · JPL
759433	2007 VY_{145}	—	November 4, 2007	Kitt Peak	Spacewatch	·	2.3 km	MPC · JPL
759434	2007 VQ_{150}	—	October 11, 2007	Kitt Peak	Spacewatch	EOS	1.7 km	MPC · JPL
759435	2007 VN_{155}	—	November 5, 2007	Kitt Peak	Spacewatch	V	480 m	MPC · JPL
759436	2007 VY_{155}	—	November 5, 2007	Kitt Peak	Spacewatch	·	1.0 km	MPC · JPL
759437	2007 VJ_{157}	—	October 20, 2007	Mount Lemmon	Mount Lemmon Survey	·	2.0 km	MPC · JPL
759438	2007 VQ_{161}	—	November 5, 2007	Kitt Peak	Spacewatch	·	1.9 km	MPC · JPL
759439	2007 VY_{161}	—	November 1, 2007	Kitt Peak	Spacewatch	·	2.5 km	MPC · JPL
759440	2007 VL_{163}	—	November 5, 2007	Kitt Peak	Spacewatch	(5)	770 m	MPC · JPL
759441	2007 VM_{170}	—	October 18, 2007	Mount Lemmon	Mount Lemmon Survey	·	1.9 km	MPC · JPL
759442	2007 VQ_{171}	—	October 9, 2007	Kitt Peak	Spacewatch	·	1.2 km	MPC · JPL
759443	2007 VV_{182}	—	November 8, 2007	Mount Lemmon	Mount Lemmon Survey	VER	1.9 km	MPC · JPL
759444	2007 VC_{183}	—	November 8, 2007	Mount Lemmon	Mount Lemmon Survey	·	1.4 km	MPC · JPL
759445	2007 VN_{186}	—	October 30, 2007	Mount Lemmon	Mount Lemmon Survey	·	870 m	MPC · JPL
759446	2007 VX_{195}	—	October 20, 2007	Kitt Peak	Spacewatch	·	2.4 km	MPC · JPL
759447	2007 VY_{198}	—	November 9, 2007	Mount Lemmon	Mount Lemmon Survey	EUN	950 m	MPC · JPL
759448	2007 VQ_{200}	—	October 30, 2007	Mount Lemmon	Mount Lemmon Survey	·	2.5 km	MPC · JPL
759449	2007 VP_{201}	—	November 9, 2007	Mount Lemmon	Mount Lemmon Survey	·	2.2 km	MPC · JPL
759450	2007 VW_{208}	—	November 6, 2007	Kitt Peak	Spacewatch	·	2.3 km	MPC · JPL
759451	2007 VB_{209}	—	October 9, 2007	Mount Lemmon	Mount Lemmon Survey	·	1.4 km	MPC · JPL
759452	2007 VM_{214}	—	October 20, 2007	Mount Lemmon	Mount Lemmon Survey	·	1.9 km	MPC · JPL
759453	2007 VR_{219}	—	November 9, 2007	Kitt Peak	Spacewatch	·	1.4 km	MPC · JPL
759454	2007 VB_{221}	—	November 12, 2007	Mount Lemmon	Mount Lemmon Survey	·	1.6 km	MPC · JPL
759455	2007 VQ_{225}	—	October 16, 2007	Kitt Peak	Spacewatch	THM	1.6 km	MPC · JPL
759456	2007 VV_{227}	—	October 10, 2007	Kitt Peak	Spacewatch	EUP	2.3 km	MPC · JPL
759457	2007 VA_{231}	—	November 7, 2007	Kitt Peak	Spacewatch	·	2.5 km	MPC · JPL
759458	2007 VQ_{233}	—	November 8, 2007	Kitt Peak	Spacewatch	EUP	2.9 km	MPC · JPL
759459	2007 VU_{233}	—	November 8, 2007	Kitt Peak	Spacewatch	·	1.3 km	MPC · JPL
759460	2007 VY_{233}	—	October 4, 2007	Kitt Peak	Spacewatch	·	2.0 km	MPC · JPL
759461	2007 VF_{235}	—	October 20, 2007	Mount Lemmon	Mount Lemmon Survey	TIR	2.1 km	MPC · JPL
759462	2007 VF_{247}	—	November 9, 2007	Kitt Peak	Spacewatch	LUT	3.5 km	MPC · JPL
759463	2007 VL_{248}	—	October 16, 2007	Mount Lemmon	Mount Lemmon Survey	·	2.3 km	MPC · JPL
759464	2007 VH_{257}	—	November 2, 2007	Mount Lemmon	Mount Lemmon Survey	·	2.2 km	MPC · JPL
759465	2007 VB_{258}	—	November 15, 2007	Mount Lemmon	Mount Lemmon Survey	·	2.5 km	MPC · JPL
759466	2007 VP_{258}	—	October 12, 2007	Mount Lemmon	Mount Lemmon Survey	VER	1.8 km	MPC · JPL
759467	2007 VR_{264}	—	November 13, 2007	Kitt Peak	Spacewatch	·	1.8 km	MPC · JPL
759468	2007 VG_{267}	—	April 28, 1993	Kitt Peak	Spacewatch	RAF	830 m	MPC · JPL
759469	2007 VA_{268}	—	November 14, 2007	Mount Lemmon	Mount Lemmon Survey	(5)	1.0 km	MPC · JPL
759470	2007 VK_{268}	—	October 12, 2007	Mount Lemmon	Mount Lemmon Survey	·	560 m	MPC · JPL
759471	2007 VG_{274}	—	October 15, 2007	Mount Lemmon	Mount Lemmon Survey	·	2.3 km	MPC · JPL
759472	2007 VL_{276}	—	September 25, 2007	Mount Lemmon	Mount Lemmon Survey	·	2.4 km	MPC · JPL
759473	2007 VT_{276}	—	November 4, 2007	Mount Lemmon	Mount Lemmon Survey	EOS	1.4 km	MPC · JPL
759474	2007 VO_{277}	—	October 7, 2007	Kitt Peak	Spacewatch	·	440 m	MPC · JPL
759475	2007 VD_{280}	—	November 14, 2007	Kitt Peak	Spacewatch	3:2	3.9 km	MPC · JPL
759476	2007 VO_{282}	—	November 14, 2007	Kitt Peak	Spacewatch	·	440 m	MPC · JPL
759477	2007 VZ_{282}	—	October 30, 2007	Kitt Peak	Spacewatch	·	2.0 km	MPC · JPL
759478	2007 VA_{284}	—	November 14, 2007	Kitt Peak	Spacewatch	THM	1.8 km	MPC · JPL
759479	2007 VO_{289}	—	November 13, 2007	Mount Lemmon	Mount Lemmon Survey	·	2.3 km	MPC · JPL
759480	2007 VZ_{302}	—	September 12, 2007	Catalina	CSS	·	1.4 km	MPC · JPL
759481	2007 VY_{318}	—	October 5, 2007	Kitt Peak	Spacewatch	·	1.3 km	MPC · JPL
759482	2007 VC_{319}	—	November 3, 2007	Kitt Peak	Spacewatch	·	2.1 km	MPC · JPL
759483	2007 VS_{320}	—	November 13, 2007	Catalina	CSS	·	1.2 km	MPC · JPL
759484	2007 VB_{326}	—	November 3, 2007	Mount Lemmon	Mount Lemmon Survey	ADE	1.5 km	MPC · JPL
759485	2007 VW_{327}	—	November 8, 2007	Socorro	LINEAR	·	2.6 km	MPC · JPL
759486	2007 VW_{337}	—	November 7, 2007	Kitt Peak	Spacewatch	3:2	3.5 km	MPC · JPL
759487	2007 VJ_{340}	—	October 20, 2007	Mount Lemmon	Mount Lemmon Survey	·	520 m	MPC · JPL
759488	2007 VF_{341}	—	October 25, 2007	Mount Lemmon	Mount Lemmon Survey	·	450 m	MPC · JPL
759489	2007 VO_{341}	—	November 9, 2007	Mount Lemmon	Mount Lemmon Survey	·	1.4 km	MPC · JPL
759490	2007 VJ_{344}	—	October 9, 2007	Mount Lemmon	Mount Lemmon Survey	·	530 m	MPC · JPL
759491	2007 VR_{344}	—	November 13, 2007	Kitt Peak	Spacewatch	·	540 m	MPC · JPL
759492	2007 VX_{344}	—	November 7, 2007	Mount Lemmon	Mount Lemmon Survey	·	1.3 km	MPC · JPL
759493	2007 VB_{345}	—	August 9, 2016	Haleakala	Pan-STARRS 1	EOS	1.3 km	MPC · JPL
759494	2007 VE_{345}	—	November 5, 2007	Mount Lemmon	Mount Lemmon Survey	·	590 m	MPC · JPL
759495	2007 VP_{345}	—	November 7, 2007	Kitt Peak	Spacewatch	·	1.0 km	MPC · JPL
759496	2007 VW_{345}	—	November 2, 2007	Mount Lemmon	Mount Lemmon Survey	(883)	460 m	MPC · JPL
759497	2007 VY_{345}	—	November 2, 2007	Mount Lemmon	Mount Lemmon Survey	·	1.5 km	MPC · JPL
759498	2007 VA_{346}	—	November 2, 2007	Kitt Peak	Spacewatch	EUN	900 m	MPC · JPL
759499	2007 VA_{347}	—	November 5, 2007	Kitt Peak	Spacewatch	MAR	800 m	MPC · JPL
759500	2007 VZ_{348}	—	November 7, 2007	Catalina	CSS	·	1.9 km	MPC · JPL

== 759501–759600 ==
back to top

Designation			Discovery			Properties		Ref
Permanent	Provisional	Named after	Date	Site	Discoverer(s)	Category	Diam.	Ref
759501	2007 VP_{349}	—	November 2, 2007	Mount Lemmon	Mount Lemmon Survey	·	1.5 km	MPC · JPL
759502	2007 VD_{350}	—	November 12, 2007	Mount Lemmon	Mount Lemmon Survey	·	810 m	MPC · JPL
759503	2007 VG_{350}	—	November 14, 2007	Kitt Peak	Spacewatch	·	2.5 km	MPC · JPL
759504	2007 VC_{351}	—	November 14, 2007	Kitt Peak	Spacewatch	·	2.2 km	MPC · JPL
759505	2007 VB_{352}	—	November 13, 2007	Mount Lemmon	Mount Lemmon Survey	·	2.5 km	MPC · JPL
759506	2007 VC_{352}	—	June 4, 2011	Mount Lemmon	Mount Lemmon Survey	·	2.5 km	MPC · JPL
759507	2007 VY_{352}	—	September 21, 2012	Mount Lemmon	Mount Lemmon Survey	·	2.2 km	MPC · JPL
759508	2007 VZ_{352}	—	November 27, 2013	Haleakala	Pan-STARRS 1	·	1.7 km	MPC · JPL
759509	2007 VA_{353}	—	July 13, 2018	Haleakala	Pan-STARRS 1	·	2.6 km	MPC · JPL
759510	2007 VH_{353}	—	November 5, 2007	Mount Lemmon	Mount Lemmon Survey	·	2.6 km	MPC · JPL
759511	2007 VL_{353}	—	April 10, 2016	Haleakala	Pan-STARRS 1	URS	2.4 km	MPC · JPL
759512	2007 VM_{353}	—	January 17, 2009	Kitt Peak	Spacewatch	·	2.2 km	MPC · JPL
759513	2007 VD_{354}	—	November 11, 2013	Mount Lemmon	Mount Lemmon Survey	·	2.5 km	MPC · JPL
759514	2007 VV_{354}	—	December 4, 2013	Haleakala	Pan-STARRS 1	·	1.9 km	MPC · JPL
759515	2007 VS_{355}	—	April 23, 2014	Cerro Tololo	DECam	·	930 m	MPC · JPL
759516	2007 VB_{356}	—	November 4, 2007	Mount Lemmon	Mount Lemmon Survey	·	620 m	MPC · JPL
759517	2007 VQ_{356}	—	November 9, 2007	Mount Lemmon	Mount Lemmon Survey	·	1.4 km	MPC · JPL
759518	2007 VU_{356}	—	June 25, 2017	Haleakala	Pan-STARRS 1	·	2.0 km	MPC · JPL
759519	2007 VZ_{356}	—	November 11, 2007	Mount Lemmon	Mount Lemmon Survey	LIX	2.7 km	MPC · JPL
759520	2007 VK_{357}	—	April 23, 2014	Haleakala	Pan-STARRS 1	·	1.5 km	MPC · JPL
759521	2007 VL_{357}	—	April 29, 2011	Mount Lemmon	Mount Lemmon Survey	·	2.3 km	MPC · JPL
759522	2007 VY_{357}	—	October 8, 2007	Mount Lemmon	Mount Lemmon Survey	AGN	980 m	MPC · JPL
759523	2007 VX_{359}	—	March 13, 2016	Haleakala	Pan-STARRS 1	·	2.3 km	MPC · JPL
759524	2007 VH_{360}	—	November 9, 2007	Kitt Peak	Spacewatch	·	510 m	MPC · JPL
759525	2007 VZ_{360}	—	February 27, 2015	Haleakala	Pan-STARRS 1	·	2.0 km	MPC · JPL
759526	2007 VU_{361}	—	March 10, 2016	Haleakala	Pan-STARRS 1	·	2.1 km	MPC · JPL
759527	2007 VK_{362}	—	October 14, 2013	Mount Lemmon	Mount Lemmon Survey	VER	2.1 km	MPC · JPL
759528	2007 VC_{363}	—	November 6, 2007	Kitt Peak	Spacewatch	·	1.5 km	MPC · JPL
759529	2007 VP_{363}	—	November 7, 2007	Catalina	CSS	·	990 m	MPC · JPL
759530	2007 VP_{364}	—	November 14, 2007	Kitt Peak	Spacewatch	(5)	790 m	MPC · JPL
759531	2007 VV_{364}	—	January 4, 2003	Kitt Peak	Deep Lens Survey	·	2.0 km	MPC · JPL
759532	2007 VL_{365}	—	November 12, 2007	Mount Lemmon	Mount Lemmon Survey	·	1.0 km	MPC · JPL
759533	2007 VO_{365}	—	November 5, 2007	Kitt Peak	Spacewatch	THM	1.7 km	MPC · JPL
759534	2007 VH_{366}	—	November 9, 2007	Mount Lemmon	Mount Lemmon Survey	·	2.5 km	MPC · JPL
759535	2007 VO_{366}	—	November 4, 2007	Mount Lemmon	Mount Lemmon Survey	·	2.1 km	MPC · JPL
759536	2007 VH_{367}	—	November 5, 2007	Mount Lemmon	Mount Lemmon Survey	·	2.0 km	MPC · JPL
759537	2007 VM_{367}	—	November 14, 2007	Kitt Peak	Spacewatch	·	1.8 km	MPC · JPL
759538	2007 VO_{367}	—	November 15, 2007	Mount Lemmon	Mount Lemmon Survey	·	2.2 km	MPC · JPL
759539	2007 VZ_{367}	—	November 8, 2007	Kitt Peak	Spacewatch	·	2.5 km	MPC · JPL
759540	2007 VE_{368}	—	November 3, 2007	Kitt Peak	Spacewatch	·	2.1 km	MPC · JPL
759541	2007 VS_{368}	—	November 7, 2007	Mount Lemmon	Mount Lemmon Survey	·	2.3 km	MPC · JPL
759542	2007 VC_{370}	—	November 1, 2007	Kitt Peak	Spacewatch	·	2.4 km	MPC · JPL
759543	2007 VQ_{372}	—	November 11, 2007	Mount Lemmon	Mount Lemmon Survey	BAR	1.3 km	MPC · JPL
759544	2007 VZ_{372}	—	November 3, 2007	Mount Lemmon	Mount Lemmon Survey	·	2.3 km	MPC · JPL
759545	2007 VP_{373}	—	November 11, 2007	Mount Lemmon	Mount Lemmon Survey	JUN	720 m	MPC · JPL
759546	2007 VW_{373}	—	November 15, 2007	Catalina	CSS	·	1.1 km	MPC · JPL
759547	2007 VH_{374}	—	November 3, 2007	Mount Lemmon	Mount Lemmon Survey	VER	1.7 km	MPC · JPL
759548	2007 VS_{375}	—	November 2, 2007	Mount Lemmon	Mount Lemmon Survey	·	2.3 km	MPC · JPL
759549	2007 VQ_{376}	—	November 5, 2007	Kitt Peak	Spacewatch	LUT	2.8 km	MPC · JPL
759550	2007 VA_{377}	—	November 7, 2007	Kitt Peak	Spacewatch	·	1 km	MPC · JPL
759551	2007 VX_{378}	—	November 15, 2007	Mount Lemmon	Mount Lemmon Survey	·	490 m	MPC · JPL
759552	2007 VZ_{378}	—	October 12, 2007	Kitt Peak	Spacewatch	KOR	960 m	MPC · JPL
759553	2007 VQ_{380}	—	November 3, 2007	Mount Lemmon	Mount Lemmon Survey	·	860 m	MPC · JPL
759554	2007 VP_{381}	—	November 13, 2007	Mount Lemmon	Mount Lemmon Survey	·	600 m	MPC · JPL
759555	2007 VE_{382}	—	November 9, 2007	Kitt Peak	Spacewatch	·	2.0 km	MPC · JPL
759556	2007 VH_{382}	—	November 9, 2007	Mount Lemmon	Mount Lemmon Survey	·	1.3 km	MPC · JPL
759557	2007 VM_{382}	—	November 4, 2007	Mount Lemmon	Mount Lemmon Survey	·	2.0 km	MPC · JPL
759558	2007 VH_{383}	—	November 9, 2007	Mount Lemmon	Mount Lemmon Survey	VER	2.1 km	MPC · JPL
759559	2007 VA_{384}	—	November 9, 2007	Mount Lemmon	Mount Lemmon Survey	·	1.4 km	MPC · JPL
759560	2007 VJ_{384}	—	November 5, 2007	Kitt Peak	Spacewatch	·	2.3 km	MPC · JPL
759561	2007 VN_{385}	—	November 8, 2007	Mount Lemmon	Mount Lemmon Survey	·	2.0 km	MPC · JPL
759562	2007 WL_{1}	—	September 11, 2001	Kitt Peak	Spacewatch	·	1.9 km	MPC · JPL
759563	2007 WE_{10}	—	November 17, 2007	Mount Lemmon	Mount Lemmon Survey	·	2.2 km	MPC · JPL
759564	2007 WC_{15}	—	November 9, 2007	Kitt Peak	Spacewatch	THB	2.1 km	MPC · JPL
759565	2007 WG_{17}	—	November 18, 2007	Mount Lemmon	Mount Lemmon Survey	·	1.3 km	MPC · JPL
759566	2007 WL_{17}	—	October 20, 2007	Mount Lemmon	Mount Lemmon Survey	·	2.7 km	MPC · JPL
759567	2007 WU_{22}	—	October 9, 2007	Kitt Peak	Spacewatch	·	2.3 km	MPC · JPL
759568	2007 WA_{28}	—	November 18, 2007	Mount Lemmon	Mount Lemmon Survey	·	1.8 km	MPC · JPL
759569	2007 WP_{32}	—	November 19, 2007	Mount Lemmon	Mount Lemmon Survey	HOF	2.0 km	MPC · JPL
759570	2007 WQ_{32}	—	November 19, 2007	Mount Lemmon	Mount Lemmon Survey	·	1.7 km	MPC · JPL
759571	2007 WZ_{32}	—	November 19, 2007	Mount Lemmon	Mount Lemmon Survey	·	920 m	MPC · JPL
759572	2007 WH_{33}	—	November 19, 2007	Mount Lemmon	Mount Lemmon Survey	AGN	920 m	MPC · JPL
759573	2007 WK_{35}	—	November 8, 2007	Kitt Peak	Spacewatch	·	2.4 km	MPC · JPL
759574	2007 WN_{40}	—	November 18, 2007	Mount Lemmon	Mount Lemmon Survey	·	520 m	MPC · JPL
759575	2007 WJ_{42}	—	November 8, 2007	Kitt Peak	Spacewatch	EUN	870 m	MPC · JPL
759576	2007 WW_{42}	—	October 20, 2007	Mount Lemmon	Mount Lemmon Survey	·	940 m	MPC · JPL
759577	2007 WC_{47}	—	November 3, 2007	Mount Lemmon	Mount Lemmon Survey	RAF	680 m	MPC · JPL
759578	2007 WK_{51}	—	November 4, 2007	Kitt Peak	Spacewatch	EOS	1.4 km	MPC · JPL
759579	2007 WP_{52}	—	November 20, 2007	Mount Lemmon	Mount Lemmon Survey	·	570 m	MPC · JPL
759580	2007 WN_{53}	—	November 2, 2007	Mount Lemmon	Mount Lemmon Survey	JUN	830 m	MPC · JPL
759581	2007 WV_{53}	—	November 18, 2007	Mount Lemmon	Mount Lemmon Survey	·	2.5 km	MPC · JPL
759582	2007 WP_{64}	—	November 19, 2007	Mount Lemmon	Mount Lemmon Survey	526	1.9 km	MPC · JPL
759583	2007 WC_{67}	—	February 18, 2015	Haleakala	Pan-STARRS 1	·	2.8 km	MPC · JPL
759584	2007 WT_{67}	—	November 19, 2007	Mount Lemmon	Mount Lemmon Survey	·	510 m	MPC · JPL
759585	2007 WX_{68}	—	November 8, 2007	Kitt Peak	Spacewatch	·	1.1 km	MPC · JPL
759586	2007 WF_{69}	—	September 21, 2012	Mount Lemmon	Mount Lemmon Survey	·	2.3 km	MPC · JPL
759587	2007 WG_{69}	—	October 7, 2016	Haleakala	Pan-STARRS 1	HOF	1.8 km	MPC · JPL
759588	2007 WX_{69}	—	January 4, 2013	Cerro Tololo-DECam	DECam	ADE	1.5 km	MPC · JPL
759589	2007 WE_{70}	—	June 27, 2015	Haleakala	Pan-STARRS 1	·	1.0 km	MPC · JPL
759590	2007 WP_{70}	—	December 23, 2016	Haleakala	Pan-STARRS 1	EUN	860 m	MPC · JPL
759591	2007 WR_{70}	—	February 10, 2016	Haleakala	Pan-STARRS 1	·	860 m	MPC · JPL
759592	2007 WD_{71}	—	October 10, 2018	Mount Lemmon	Mount Lemmon Survey	VER	2.0 km	MPC · JPL
759593	2007 WP_{71}	—	November 20, 2007	Kitt Peak	Spacewatch	VER	2.1 km	MPC · JPL
759594	2007 WS_{72}	—	November 17, 2007	Kitt Peak	Spacewatch	·	2.3 km	MPC · JPL
759595	2007 WG_{73}	—	November 17, 2007	Kitt Peak	Spacewatch	·	2.2 km	MPC · JPL
759596	2007 WC_{74}	—	October 14, 2007	Mount Lemmon	Mount Lemmon Survey	·	2.6 km	MPC · JPL
759597	2007 WW_{74}	—	November 17, 2007	Mount Lemmon	Mount Lemmon Survey	·	1.1 km	MPC · JPL
759598	2007 WP_{75}	—	November 20, 2007	Mount Lemmon	Mount Lemmon Survey	V	430 m	MPC · JPL
759599	2007 XC_{8}	—	November 14, 2007	Kitt Peak	Spacewatch	·	1.6 km	MPC · JPL
759600	2007 XA_{14}	—	December 5, 2007	Kitt Peak	Spacewatch	·	1.2 km	MPC · JPL

== 759601–759700 ==
back to top

Designation			Discovery			Properties		Ref
Permanent	Provisional	Named after	Date	Site	Discoverer(s)	Category	Diam.	Ref
759601	2007 XR_{19}	—	December 12, 2007	Socorro	LINEAR	TIR	2.3 km	MPC · JPL
759602	2007 XY_{40}	—	November 14, 2007	Kitt Peak	Spacewatch	·	480 m	MPC · JPL
759603	2007 XP_{62}	—	December 6, 2007	Kitt Peak	Spacewatch	·	2.5 km	MPC · JPL
759604	2007 XE_{63}	—	December 5, 2007	Kitt Peak	Spacewatch	(1547)	1.2 km	MPC · JPL
759605	2007 XS_{63}	—	December 4, 2007	Mount Lemmon	Mount Lemmon Survey	·	1.4 km	MPC · JPL
759606	2007 XK_{64}	—	December 3, 2007	Kitt Peak	Spacewatch	·	1.1 km	MPC · JPL
759607	2007 XP_{65}	—	December 5, 2007	Kitt Peak	Spacewatch	THM	1.5 km	MPC · JPL
759608	2007 XV_{65}	—	December 4, 2007	Mount Lemmon	Mount Lemmon Survey	·	2.1 km	MPC · JPL
759609	2007 XX_{65}	—	June 29, 2014	Mount Lemmon	Mount Lemmon Survey	·	1.3 km	MPC · JPL
759610	2007 XZ_{65}	—	November 18, 2007	Kitt Peak	Spacewatch	·	2.0 km	MPC · JPL
759611	2007 XE_{66}	—	January 10, 2013	Haleakala	Pan-STARRS 1	·	1.4 km	MPC · JPL
759612	2007 XL_{66}	—	November 8, 2007	Kitt Peak	Spacewatch	GEF	880 m	MPC · JPL
759613	2007 XP_{66}	—	November 8, 2007	Kitt Peak	Spacewatch	·	2.5 km	MPC · JPL
759614	2007 XU_{66}	—	December 3, 2007	Kitt Peak	Spacewatch	·	2.3 km	MPC · JPL
759615	2007 XX_{66}	—	December 5, 2007	Mount Lemmon	Mount Lemmon Survey	·	2.6 km	MPC · JPL
759616	2007 XL_{67}	—	February 4, 2013	Oukaïmeden	C. Rinner	·	1.0 km	MPC · JPL
759617	2007 XO_{67}	—	December 4, 2007	Kitt Peak	Spacewatch	·	1.5 km	MPC · JPL
759618	2007 XR_{67}	—	January 2, 2017	Haleakala	Pan-STARRS 1	·	1.2 km	MPC · JPL
759619	2007 XU_{67}	—	February 27, 2015	Mount Lemmon	Mount Lemmon Survey	·	2.9 km	MPC · JPL
759620	2007 XL_{68}	—	December 4, 2007	Kitt Peak	Spacewatch	THM	1.6 km	MPC · JPL
759621	2007 XV_{68}	—	December 14, 2007	Mount Lemmon	Mount Lemmon Survey	EUP	3.2 km	MPC · JPL
759622	2007 XX_{68}	—	December 4, 2007	Kitt Peak	Spacewatch	THM	1.5 km	MPC · JPL
759623	2007 XB_{69}	—	December 4, 2007	Kitt Peak	Spacewatch	·	2.2 km	MPC · JPL
759624	2007 XO_{69}	—	December 15, 2007	Mount Lemmon	Mount Lemmon Survey	·	2.3 km	MPC · JPL
759625	2007 XV_{70}	—	December 6, 2007	Kitt Peak	Spacewatch	·	970 m	MPC · JPL
759626	2007 XX_{70}	—	December 5, 2007	Kitt Peak	Spacewatch	·	2.3 km	MPC · JPL
759627	2007 XN_{72}	—	December 4, 2007	Kitt Peak	Spacewatch	EOS	1.5 km	MPC · JPL
759628	2007 YJ_{4}	—	November 9, 2007	Mount Lemmon	Mount Lemmon Survey	EUN	870 m	MPC · JPL
759629	2007 YA_{14}	—	September 14, 2018	Mount Lemmon	Mount Lemmon Survey	·	2.5 km	MPC · JPL
759630	2007 YN_{16}	—	December 5, 2007	Kitt Peak	Spacewatch	·	1.8 km	MPC · JPL
759631	2007 YC_{20}	—	December 16, 2007	Kitt Peak	Spacewatch	·	2.2 km	MPC · JPL
759632	2007 YV_{21}	—	November 11, 2007	Mount Lemmon	Mount Lemmon Survey	JUN	710 m	MPC · JPL
759633	2007 YF_{22}	—	December 4, 2007	Kitt Peak	Spacewatch	·	1.0 km	MPC · JPL
759634	2007 YQ_{26}	—	December 18, 2007	Mount Lemmon	Mount Lemmon Survey	HNS	880 m	MPC · JPL
759635	2007 YV_{27}	—	December 18, 2007	Kitt Peak	Spacewatch	TIR	2.3 km	MPC · JPL
759636	2007 YQ_{33}	—	December 6, 2007	Mount Lemmon	Mount Lemmon Survey	·	3.3 km	MPC · JPL
759637	2007 YY_{33}	—	December 28, 2007	Kitt Peak	Spacewatch	·	2.3 km	MPC · JPL
759638	2007 YQ_{35}	—	December 30, 2007	Mount Lemmon	Mount Lemmon Survey	·	1.8 km	MPC · JPL
759639	2007 YH_{38}	—	December 4, 2007	Kitt Peak	Spacewatch	T_{j} (2.98) · EUP	3.2 km	MPC · JPL
759640	2007 YO_{40}	—	December 16, 2007	Mount Lemmon	Mount Lemmon Survey	·	410 m	MPC · JPL
759641	2007 YR_{45}	—	December 30, 2007	Mount Lemmon	Mount Lemmon Survey	·	2.6 km	MPC · JPL
759642	2007 YB_{54}	—	December 31, 2007	Kitt Peak	Spacewatch	·	1.6 km	MPC · JPL
759643	2007 YX_{57}	—	December 20, 2007	Mount Lemmon	Mount Lemmon Survey	·	2.2 km	MPC · JPL
759644	2007 YF_{62}	—	December 30, 2007	Mount Lemmon	Mount Lemmon Survey	·	2.6 km	MPC · JPL
759645	2007 YZ_{64}	—	December 30, 2007	Mount Lemmon	Mount Lemmon Survey	·	1.3 km	MPC · JPL
759646	2007 YR_{66}	—	December 30, 2007	Mount Lemmon	Mount Lemmon Survey	·	1.2 km	MPC · JPL
759647	2007 YC_{70}	—	December 31, 2007	Mount Lemmon	Mount Lemmon Survey	·	1.5 km	MPC · JPL
759648	2007 YA_{76}	—	December 16, 2007	Mount Lemmon	Mount Lemmon Survey	·	2.6 km	MPC · JPL
759649	2007 YQ_{76}	—	December 18, 2007	Mount Lemmon	Mount Lemmon Survey	·	2.5 km	MPC · JPL
759650	2007 YJ_{77}	—	December 30, 2007	Mount Lemmon	Mount Lemmon Survey	·	1.5 km	MPC · JPL
759651	2007 YL_{77}	—	December 30, 2007	Mount Lemmon	Mount Lemmon Survey	·	480 m	MPC · JPL
759652	2007 YT_{77}	—	December 31, 2007	Mount Lemmon	Mount Lemmon Survey	·	1.0 km	MPC · JPL
759653	2007 YU_{78}	—	December 16, 2007	Kitt Peak	Spacewatch	·	1 km	MPC · JPL
759654	2007 YJ_{79}	—	December 30, 2007	Kitt Peak	Spacewatch	V	460 m	MPC · JPL
759655	2007 YC_{80}	—	September 12, 2016	Haleakala	Pan-STARRS 1	·	1.4 km	MPC · JPL
759656	2007 YE_{80}	—	August 1, 2017	Haleakala	Pan-STARRS 1	·	730 m	MPC · JPL
759657	2007 YQ_{80}	—	October 12, 2010	Mount Lemmon	Mount Lemmon Survey	·	470 m	MPC · JPL
759658	2007 YR_{81}	—	December 30, 2007	Mount Lemmon	Mount Lemmon Survey	·	1.1 km	MPC · JPL
759659	2007 YD_{82}	—	December 30, 2007	Kitt Peak	Spacewatch	·	2.7 km	MPC · JPL
759660	2007 YR_{82}	—	November 12, 2012	Mount Lemmon	Mount Lemmon Survey	·	1.8 km	MPC · JPL
759661	2007 YV_{83}	—	December 30, 2007	Mount Lemmon	Mount Lemmon Survey	·	1.2 km	MPC · JPL
759662	2007 YD_{84}	—	December 30, 2007	Mount Lemmon	Mount Lemmon Survey	·	1.2 km	MPC · JPL
759663	2007 YM_{84}	—	December 31, 2007	Kitt Peak	Spacewatch	·	570 m	MPC · JPL
759664	2007 YQ_{84}	—	February 14, 2013	Haleakala	Pan-STARRS 1	·	1.4 km	MPC · JPL
759665	2007 YA_{86}	—	July 24, 2017	Haleakala	Pan-STARRS 1	·	2.3 km	MPC · JPL
759666	2007 YB_{86}	—	December 31, 2007	Kitt Peak	Spacewatch	·	1.3 km	MPC · JPL
759667	2007 YM_{86}	—	December 30, 2007	Kitt Peak	Spacewatch	·	1.0 km	MPC · JPL
759668	2007 YK_{87}	—	November 2, 2011	Mount Lemmon	Mount Lemmon Survey	·	1.2 km	MPC · JPL
759669	2007 YU_{87}	—	December 23, 2012	Haleakala	Pan-STARRS 1	·	1.5 km	MPC · JPL
759670	2007 YZ_{87}	—	December 30, 2007	Kitt Peak	Spacewatch	·	2.4 km	MPC · JPL
759671	2007 YB_{88}	—	September 30, 2017	Haleakala	Pan-STARRS 1	EOS	1.3 km	MPC · JPL
759672	2007 YC_{88}	—	October 18, 2012	Haleakala	Pan-STARRS 1	·	2.2 km	MPC · JPL
759673	2007 YF_{88}	—	October 3, 2011	Catalina	CSS	·	1.6 km	MPC · JPL
759674	2007 YK_{88}	—	December 30, 2007	Mount Lemmon	Mount Lemmon Survey	(1547)	1.1 km	MPC · JPL
759675	2007 YR_{88}	—	October 24, 2011	Haleakala	Pan-STARRS 1	·	1.0 km	MPC · JPL
759676	2007 YS_{88}	—	October 10, 2015	Haleakala	Pan-STARRS 1	(29841)	1.1 km	MPC · JPL
759677	2007 YY_{88}	—	December 17, 2007	Mount Lemmon	Mount Lemmon Survey	HNS	820 m	MPC · JPL
759678	2007 YZ_{88}	—	October 13, 2017	Mount Lemmon	Mount Lemmon Survey	·	550 m	MPC · JPL
759679	2007 YL_{89}	—	May 24, 2017	Haleakala	Pan-STARRS 1	T_{j} (2.97) · EUP	2.8 km	MPC · JPL
759680	2007 YO_{91}	—	December 18, 2007	Mount Lemmon	Mount Lemmon Survey	·	1.5 km	MPC · JPL
759681	2007 YP_{91}	—	December 19, 2007	Mount Lemmon	Mount Lemmon Survey	·	2.2 km	MPC · JPL
759682	2007 YZ_{91}	—	December 30, 2007	Kitt Peak	Spacewatch	·	1.8 km	MPC · JPL
759683	2007 YL_{92}	—	December 30, 2007	Kitt Peak	Spacewatch	LIX	2.8 km	MPC · JPL
759684	2007 YP_{92}	—	December 16, 2007	Mount Lemmon	Mount Lemmon Survey	·	2.2 km	MPC · JPL
759685	2007 YW_{92}	—	December 17, 2007	Kitt Peak	Spacewatch	·	2.4 km	MPC · JPL
759686	2007 YX_{92}	—	December 31, 2007	Mount Lemmon	Mount Lemmon Survey	THM	1.9 km	MPC · JPL
759687	2007 YD_{93}	—	December 30, 2007	Mount Lemmon	Mount Lemmon Survey	·	1.5 km	MPC · JPL
759688	2007 YT_{93}	—	December 16, 2007	Mount Lemmon	Mount Lemmon Survey	·	470 m	MPC · JPL
759689	2007 YH_{94}	—	December 17, 2007	Mount Lemmon	Mount Lemmon Survey	·	2.5 km	MPC · JPL
759690	2007 YD_{95}	—	December 17, 2007	Kitt Peak	Spacewatch	·	2.8 km	MPC · JPL
759691	2007 YV_{95}	—	December 19, 2007	Kitt Peak	Spacewatch	THM	1.7 km	MPC · JPL
759692	2007 YA_{96}	—	December 30, 2007	Mount Lemmon	Mount Lemmon Survey	·	1.7 km	MPC · JPL
759693	2007 YS_{96}	—	December 18, 2007	Mount Lemmon	Mount Lemmon Survey	·	730 m	MPC · JPL
759694	2007 YH_{97}	—	December 17, 2007	Kitt Peak	Spacewatch	·	1.6 km	MPC · JPL
759695	2007 YX_{97}	—	December 30, 2007	Kitt Peak	Spacewatch	·	1.4 km	MPC · JPL
759696	2008 AE_{6}	—	December 18, 2007	Mount Lemmon	Mount Lemmon Survey	·	2.4 km	MPC · JPL
759697	2008 AH_{6}	—	December 18, 2007	Mount Lemmon	Mount Lemmon Survey	KON	1.8 km	MPC · JPL
759698	2008 AW_{8}	—	January 10, 2008	Kitt Peak	Spacewatch	·	1.8 km	MPC · JPL
759699	2008 AE_{10}	—	January 10, 2008	Mount Lemmon	Mount Lemmon Survey	EUN	1.0 km	MPC · JPL
759700	2008 AH_{12}	—	January 10, 2008	Mount Lemmon	Mount Lemmon Survey	HYG	2.0 km	MPC · JPL

== 759701–759800 ==
back to top

Designation			Discovery			Properties		Ref
Permanent	Provisional	Named after	Date	Site	Discoverer(s)	Category	Diam.	Ref
759701	2008 AO_{18}	—	January 10, 2008	Mount Lemmon	Mount Lemmon Survey	·	990 m	MPC · JPL
759702	2008 AH_{24}	—	January 10, 2008	Mount Lemmon	Mount Lemmon Survey	·	1.5 km	MPC · JPL
759703	2008 AD_{25}	—	August 19, 2006	Kitt Peak	Spacewatch	·	1.2 km	MPC · JPL
759704	2008 AT_{37}	—	January 10, 2008	Mount Lemmon	Mount Lemmon Survey	·	1.4 km	MPC · JPL
759705	2008 AA_{43}	—	December 4, 2007	Mount Lemmon	Mount Lemmon Survey	T_{j} (2.99) · EUP	3.2 km	MPC · JPL
759706	2008 AJ_{43}	—	December 6, 2007	Kitt Peak	Spacewatch	·	1.3 km	MPC · JPL
759707	2008 AB_{46}	—	December 18, 2007	Kitt Peak	Spacewatch	·	940 m	MPC · JPL
759708	2008 AW_{46}	—	December 5, 2007	Kitt Peak	Spacewatch	·	1.3 km	MPC · JPL
759709	2008 AR_{47}	—	December 20, 2007	Kitt Peak	Spacewatch	(1547)	1.1 km	MPC · JPL
759710	2008 AW_{49}	—	January 11, 2008	Kitt Peak	Spacewatch	·	900 m	MPC · JPL
759711	2008 AC_{51}	—	January 11, 2008	Kitt Peak	Spacewatch	·	1.0 km	MPC · JPL
759712	2008 AC_{52}	—	January 11, 2008	Kitt Peak	Spacewatch	(2076)	470 m	MPC · JPL
759713	2008 AH_{52}	—	January 11, 2008	Kitt Peak	Spacewatch	·	1.2 km	MPC · JPL
759714	2008 AY_{52}	—	January 11, 2008	Kitt Peak	Spacewatch	·	870 m	MPC · JPL
759715	2008 AD_{54}	—	January 11, 2008	Kitt Peak	Spacewatch	·	1.4 km	MPC · JPL
759716	2008 AM_{56}	—	January 11, 2008	Kitt Peak	Spacewatch	·	1.2 km	MPC · JPL
759717	2008 AN_{59}	—	January 11, 2008	Kitt Peak	Spacewatch	JUN	780 m	MPC · JPL
759718	2008 AV_{63}	—	January 11, 2008	Kitt Peak	Spacewatch	·	1.6 km	MPC · JPL
759719	2008 AT_{64}	—	November 11, 2007	Mount Lemmon	Mount Lemmon Survey	·	1.2 km	MPC · JPL
759720	2008 AQ_{65}	—	December 31, 2007	Kitt Peak	Spacewatch	·	1.3 km	MPC · JPL
759721	2008 AR_{67}	—	January 11, 2008	Kitt Peak	Spacewatch	·	2.0 km	MPC · JPL
759722	2008 AY_{67}	—	December 15, 2007	Mount Lemmon	Mount Lemmon Survey	·	1.1 km	MPC · JPL
759723	2008 AV_{75}	—	January 11, 2008	Kitt Peak	Spacewatch	·	950 m	MPC · JPL
759724	2008 AF_{84}	—	December 17, 2007	Mount Lemmon	Mount Lemmon Survey	·	2.6 km	MPC · JPL
759725	2008 AS_{85}	—	December 15, 2007	Mount Lemmon	Mount Lemmon Survey	THB	2.4 km	MPC · JPL
759726	2008 AR_{87}	—	December 30, 2007	Kitt Peak	Spacewatch	·	940 m	MPC · JPL
759727	2008 AT_{88}	—	December 30, 2007	Kitt Peak	Spacewatch	·	1.3 km	MPC · JPL
759728	2008 AH_{90}	—	December 15, 2007	Mount Lemmon	Mount Lemmon Survey	·	560 m	MPC · JPL
759729	2008 AX_{95}	—	January 14, 2008	Kitt Peak	Spacewatch	·	3.5 km	MPC · JPL
759730	2008 AB_{99}	—	January 14, 2008	Kitt Peak	Spacewatch	·	1.3 km	MPC · JPL
759731	2008 AH_{99}	—	January 14, 2008	Kitt Peak	Spacewatch	·	1.0 km	MPC · JPL
759732	2008 AL_{99}	—	January 14, 2008	Kitt Peak	Spacewatch	MAR	850 m	MPC · JPL
759733	2008 AR_{106}	—	December 30, 2007	Mount Lemmon	Mount Lemmon Survey	·	620 m	MPC · JPL
759734	2008 AF_{109}	—	January 11, 2008	Kitt Peak	Spacewatch	·	480 m	MPC · JPL
759735	2008 AC_{125}	—	January 14, 2008	Kitt Peak	Spacewatch	·	1.2 km	MPC · JPL
759736	2008 AO_{128}	—	January 14, 2008	Kitt Peak	Spacewatch	·	1.2 km	MPC · JPL
759737	2008 AV_{128}	—	January 1, 2008	Kitt Peak	Spacewatch	·	1.4 km	MPC · JPL
759738	2008 AR_{130}	—	January 6, 2008	Mauna Kea	P. A. Wiegert, A. M. Gilbert	EOS	1.4 km	MPC · JPL
759739	2008 AM_{132}	—	January 6, 2008	Mauna Kea	P. A. Wiegert, A. M. Gilbert	·	1.2 km	MPC · JPL
759740	2008 AQ_{132}	—	December 30, 2007	Mount Lemmon	Mount Lemmon Survey	·	980 m	MPC · JPL
759741	2008 AY_{134}	—	January 10, 2008	Mount Lemmon	Mount Lemmon Survey	·	2.3 km	MPC · JPL
759742	2008 AP_{141}	—	February 15, 2012	Haleakala	Pan-STARRS 1	·	550 m	MPC · JPL
759743	2008 AX_{141}	—	January 11, 2008	Kitt Peak	Spacewatch	VER	1.8 km	MPC · JPL
759744	2008 AC_{142}	—	January 20, 2012	Mount Lemmon	Mount Lemmon Survey	·	790 m	MPC · JPL
759745	2008 AP_{142}	—	January 11, 2008	Kitt Peak	Spacewatch	V	370 m	MPC · JPL
759746	2008 AG_{143}	—	January 15, 2008	Mount Lemmon	Mount Lemmon Survey	·	1.1 km	MPC · JPL
759747	2008 AM_{143}	—	January 15, 2008	Mount Lemmon	Mount Lemmon Survey	HNS	940 m	MPC · JPL
759748	2008 AQ_{143}	—	January 14, 2008	Kitt Peak	Spacewatch	·	2.5 km	MPC · JPL
759749	2008 AV_{143}	—	January 14, 2008	Kitt Peak	Spacewatch	·	950 m	MPC · JPL
759750	2008 AZ_{144}	—	August 26, 2012	Haleakala	Pan-STARRS 1	VER	2.0 km	MPC · JPL
759751	2008 AT_{145}	—	July 25, 2014	Haleakala	Pan-STARRS 1	·	1.0 km	MPC · JPL
759752	2008 AU_{145}	—	October 24, 2011	Kitt Peak	Spacewatch	·	1.4 km	MPC · JPL
759753	2008 AA_{146}	—	January 10, 2008	Kitt Peak	Spacewatch	EUN	910 m	MPC · JPL
759754	2008 AG_{147}	—	January 1, 2008	Kitt Peak	Spacewatch	·	1.2 km	MPC · JPL
759755	2008 AM_{147}	—	October 26, 2011	Haleakala	Pan-STARRS 1	MRX	790 m	MPC · JPL
759756	2008 AP_{147}	—	October 26, 2011	Haleakala	Pan-STARRS 1	·	1.3 km	MPC · JPL
759757	2008 AA_{148}	—	November 6, 2010	Mount Lemmon	Mount Lemmon Survey	·	500 m	MPC · JPL
759758	2008 AC_{148}	—	July 27, 2014	Haleakala	Pan-STARRS 1	·	1.4 km	MPC · JPL
759759	2008 AD_{148}	—	January 1, 2008	Kitt Peak	Spacewatch	·	1.4 km	MPC · JPL
759760	2008 AQ_{148}	—	September 14, 2013	Haleakala	Pan-STARRS 1	·	510 m	MPC · JPL
759761	2008 AE_{149}	—	January 1, 2008	Kitt Peak	Spacewatch	·	1.2 km	MPC · JPL
759762	2008 AC_{150}	—	January 15, 2008	Mount Lemmon	Mount Lemmon Survey	T_{j} (2.97)	3.0 km	MPC · JPL
759763	2008 AP_{150}	—	January 15, 2008	Kitt Peak	Spacewatch	·	2.6 km	MPC · JPL
759764	2008 AS_{150}	—	January 11, 2008	Kitt Peak	Spacewatch	·	1.1 km	MPC · JPL
759765	2008 AT_{150}	—	January 1, 2008	Kitt Peak	Spacewatch	·	2.7 km	MPC · JPL
759766	2008 AL_{151}	—	January 13, 2008	Kitt Peak	Spacewatch	·	1.1 km	MPC · JPL
759767	2008 AC_{152}	—	January 12, 2008	Kitt Peak	Spacewatch	·	1.3 km	MPC · JPL
759768	2008 AF_{153}	—	January 13, 2008	Kitt Peak	Spacewatch	·	1.4 km	MPC · JPL
759769	2008 AM_{156}	—	January 11, 2008	Kitt Peak	Spacewatch	·	640 m	MPC · JPL
759770	2008 AC_{158}	—	January 11, 2008	Kitt Peak	Spacewatch	·	1.3 km	MPC · JPL
759771	2008 AL_{158}	—	January 1, 2008	Kitt Peak	Spacewatch	EOS	1.4 km	MPC · JPL
759772	2008 BH_{11}	—	December 31, 2007	Kitt Peak	Spacewatch	·	1.9 km	MPC · JPL
759773	2008 BV_{16}	—	January 30, 2008	Vail	Observatory, Jarnac	·	1.1 km	MPC · JPL
759774	2008 BY_{17}	—	January 13, 2008	Kitt Peak	Spacewatch	T_{j} (2.98) · EUP	2.7 km	MPC · JPL
759775	2008 BJ_{18}	—	January 30, 2008	Mount Lemmon	Mount Lemmon Survey	·	1.2 km	MPC · JPL
759776	2008 BB_{26}	—	January 30, 2008	Kitt Peak	Spacewatch	·	1.1 km	MPC · JPL
759777	2008 BR_{26}	—	January 11, 2008	Mount Lemmon	Mount Lemmon Survey	·	1.2 km	MPC · JPL
759778	2008 BJ_{29}	—	December 30, 2007	Kitt Peak	Spacewatch	·	1.6 km	MPC · JPL
759779	2008 BD_{55}	—	January 16, 2008	Mount Lemmon	Mount Lemmon Survey	·	2.7 km	MPC · JPL
759780	2008 BF_{55}	—	January 30, 2004	Kitt Peak	Spacewatch	JUN	730 m	MPC · JPL
759781	2008 BJ_{56}	—	January 18, 2008	Mount Lemmon	Mount Lemmon Survey	·	1.6 km	MPC · JPL
759782	2008 BB_{58}	—	December 8, 2015	Mount Lemmon	Mount Lemmon Survey	·	970 m	MPC · JPL
759783	2008 BC_{58}	—	January 12, 2008	Kitt Peak	Spacewatch	·	1.1 km	MPC · JPL
759784	2008 BX_{58}	—	May 1, 2013	Palomar	Palomar Transient Factory	ADE	1.5 km	MPC · JPL
759785	2008 BM_{59}	—	January 30, 2008	Mount Lemmon	Mount Lemmon Survey	EUN	860 m	MPC · JPL
759786	2008 BO_{59}	—	August 28, 2016	Mount Lemmon	Mount Lemmon Survey	·	710 m	MPC · JPL
759787	2008 BD_{60}	—	January 30, 2008	Mount Lemmon	Mount Lemmon Survey	·	1.7 km	MPC · JPL
759788	2008 BZ_{60}	—	January 19, 2008	Kitt Peak	Spacewatch	·	2.5 km	MPC · JPL
759789	2008 BN_{62}	—	January 19, 2008	Mount Lemmon	Mount Lemmon Survey	VER	2.2 km	MPC · JPL
759790	2008 BX_{62}	—	January 18, 2008	Mount Lemmon	Mount Lemmon Survey	·	2.5 km	MPC · JPL
759791	2008 BD_{63}	—	January 16, 2008	Kitt Peak	Spacewatch	·	1.3 km	MPC · JPL
759792	2008 CX_{3}	—	February 2, 2008	Mount Lemmon	Mount Lemmon Survey	·	2.4 km	MPC · JPL
759793	2008 CS_{9}	—	February 2, 2008	Mount Lemmon	Mount Lemmon Survey	·	1.4 km	MPC · JPL
759794	2008 CZ_{13}	—	February 3, 2008	Kitt Peak	Spacewatch	·	1.2 km	MPC · JPL
759795	2008 CK_{40}	—	February 2, 2008	Mount Lemmon	Mount Lemmon Survey	AST	1.3 km	MPC · JPL
759796	2008 CY_{51}	—	February 7, 2008	Kitt Peak	Spacewatch	NEM	1.5 km	MPC · JPL
759797	2008 CG_{53}	—	February 7, 2008	Kitt Peak	Spacewatch	·	1.3 km	MPC · JPL
759798	2008 CO_{60}	—	February 7, 2008	Mount Lemmon	Mount Lemmon Survey	·	2.4 km	MPC · JPL
759799	2008 CD_{65}	—	February 8, 2008	Mount Lemmon	Mount Lemmon Survey	·	410 m	MPC · JPL
759800	2008 CG_{65}	—	February 8, 2008	Mount Lemmon	Mount Lemmon Survey	·	2.4 km	MPC · JPL

== 759801–759900 ==
back to top

Designation			Discovery			Properties		Ref
Permanent	Provisional	Named after	Date	Site	Discoverer(s)	Category	Diam.	Ref
759801	2008 CU_{67}	—	February 8, 2008	Mount Lemmon	Mount Lemmon Survey	·	2.8 km	MPC · JPL
759802	2008 CJ_{85}	—	February 7, 2008	Kitt Peak	Spacewatch	EUN	940 m	MPC · JPL
759803	2008 CT_{87}	—	February 7, 2008	Mount Lemmon	Mount Lemmon Survey	HNS	820 m	MPC · JPL
759804	2008 CA_{92}	—	February 8, 2008	Mount Lemmon	Mount Lemmon Survey	EUN	730 m	MPC · JPL
759805	2008 CS_{93}	—	February 8, 2008	Mount Lemmon	Mount Lemmon Survey	·	1.2 km	MPC · JPL
759806	2008 CD_{96}	—	January 1, 2008	Kitt Peak	Spacewatch	ADE	1.3 km	MPC · JPL
759807	2008 CE_{97}	—	February 9, 2008	Kitt Peak	Spacewatch	JUN	720 m	MPC · JPL
759808	2008 CY_{101}	—	December 31, 2007	Kitt Peak	Spacewatch	·	1.9 km	MPC · JPL
759809	2008 CA_{105}	—	February 9, 2008	Mount Lemmon	Mount Lemmon Survey	·	1.4 km	MPC · JPL
759810	2008 CB_{106}	—	February 9, 2008	Mount Lemmon	Mount Lemmon Survey	·	1.2 km	MPC · JPL
759811	2008 CD_{106}	—	February 9, 2008	Mount Lemmon	Mount Lemmon Survey	·	1.1 km	MPC · JPL
759812	2008 CD_{107}	—	February 9, 2008	Mount Lemmon	Mount Lemmon Survey	·	1.3 km	MPC · JPL
759813	2008 CJ_{123}	—	February 7, 2008	Mount Lemmon	Mount Lemmon Survey	·	1.1 km	MPC · JPL
759814	2008 CV_{123}	—	February 7, 2008	Mount Lemmon	Mount Lemmon Survey	·	1.1 km	MPC · JPL
759815	2008 CZ_{124}	—	September 17, 2006	Kitt Peak	Spacewatch	·	1.1 km	MPC · JPL
759816	2008 CF_{126}	—	February 8, 2008	Kitt Peak	Spacewatch	·	1.1 km	MPC · JPL
759817	2008 CD_{128}	—	February 8, 2008	Kitt Peak	Spacewatch	·	1.0 km	MPC · JPL
759818	2008 CR_{130}	—	February 8, 2008	Mount Lemmon	Mount Lemmon Survey	·	1.3 km	MPC · JPL
759819	2008 CU_{150}	—	February 9, 2008	Kitt Peak	Spacewatch	EUN	920 m	MPC · JPL
759820	2008 CA_{155}	—	February 9, 2008	Kitt Peak	Spacewatch	·	630 m	MPC · JPL
759821	2008 CG_{155}	—	February 9, 2008	Mount Lemmon	Mount Lemmon Survey	JUN	690 m	MPC · JPL
759822	2008 CP_{160}	—	February 9, 2008	Kitt Peak	Spacewatch	·	1.6 km	MPC · JPL
759823	2008 CF_{164}	—	February 10, 2008	Kitt Peak	Spacewatch	·	1.1 km	MPC · JPL
759824	2008 CP_{165}	—	February 10, 2008	Kitt Peak	Spacewatch	·	550 m	MPC · JPL
759825	2008 CP_{166}	—	December 17, 2007	Kitt Peak	Spacewatch	EUN	860 m	MPC · JPL
759826	2008 CO_{167}	—	January 18, 2008	Mount Lemmon	Mount Lemmon Survey	·	520 m	MPC · JPL
759827	2008 CE_{169}	—	January 31, 2008	Kitt Peak	Spacewatch	·	640 m	MPC · JPL
759828	2008 CX_{169}	—	October 29, 2006	Kitt Peak	Spacewatch	NEM	1.6 km	MPC · JPL
759829	2008 CS_{172}	—	October 27, 2006	Mount Lemmon	Mount Lemmon Survey	·	1.3 km	MPC · JPL
759830	2008 CV_{173}	—	February 13, 2008	Mount Lemmon	Mount Lemmon Survey	·	1.8 km	MPC · JPL
759831	2008 CM_{174}	—	February 13, 2008	Mount Lemmon	Mount Lemmon Survey	·	1.2 km	MPC · JPL
759832	2008 CJ_{197}	—	February 8, 2008	Kitt Peak	Spacewatch	·	2.0 km	MPC · JPL
759833	2008 CQ_{197}	—	February 9, 2008	Mount Lemmon	Mount Lemmon Survey	·	1.1 km	MPC · JPL
759834	2008 CJ_{198}	—	February 12, 2008	Kitt Peak	Spacewatch	THM	1.9 km	MPC · JPL
759835	2008 CA_{201}	—	February 11, 2008	Mount Lemmon	Mount Lemmon Survey	·	1.1 km	MPC · JPL
759836	2008 CM_{218}	—	February 8, 2008	Kitt Peak	Spacewatch	·	1.6 km	MPC · JPL
759837	2008 CP_{218}	—	February 13, 2008	Kitt Peak	Spacewatch	·	560 m	MPC · JPL
759838	2008 CB_{222}	—	October 13, 2010	Mount Lemmon	Mount Lemmon Survey	·	620 m	MPC · JPL
759839	2008 CX_{222}	—	February 9, 2008	Mount Lemmon	Mount Lemmon Survey	·	1.2 km	MPC · JPL
759840	2008 CN_{223}	—	January 13, 2008	Kitt Peak	Spacewatch	·	2.6 km	MPC · JPL
759841	2008 CB_{224}	—	January 24, 2015	Haleakala	Pan-STARRS 1	·	840 m	MPC · JPL
759842	2008 CG_{225}	—	January 16, 2015	Haleakala	Pan-STARRS 1	·	570 m	MPC · JPL
759843	2008 CD_{226}	—	February 9, 2008	Mount Lemmon	Mount Lemmon Survey	·	540 m	MPC · JPL
759844	2008 CL_{226}	—	February 12, 2008	Mount Lemmon	Mount Lemmon Survey	·	990 m	MPC · JPL
759845	2008 CP_{226}	—	February 10, 2008	Mount Lemmon	Mount Lemmon Survey	·	1.4 km	MPC · JPL
759846	2008 CF_{227}	—	February 11, 2008	Mount Lemmon	Mount Lemmon Survey	·	1.1 km	MPC · JPL
759847	2008 CH_{227}	—	February 2, 2008	Kitt Peak	Spacewatch	·	800 m	MPC · JPL
759848	2008 CJ_{227}	—	August 12, 2010	Kitt Peak	Spacewatch	·	1.3 km	MPC · JPL
759849	2008 CS_{227}	—	February 8, 2008	Kitt Peak	Spacewatch	·	1.8 km	MPC · JPL
759850	2008 CR_{229}	—	February 10, 2008	Mount Lemmon	Mount Lemmon Survey	·	660 m	MPC · JPL
759851	2008 CZ_{229}	—	August 10, 2010	Kitt Peak	Spacewatch	HNS	1.0 km	MPC · JPL
759852	2008 CF_{230}	—	November 8, 2015	Mount Lemmon	Mount Lemmon Survey	·	1.2 km	MPC · JPL
759853	2008 CH_{231}	—	August 24, 2011	Haleakala	Pan-STARRS 1	VER	2.0 km	MPC · JPL
759854	2008 CA_{232}	—	March 17, 2012	Kitt Peak	Spacewatch	·	880 m	MPC · JPL
759855	2008 CW_{233}	—	January 17, 2015	Haleakala	Pan-STARRS 1	·	580 m	MPC · JPL
759856	2008 CN_{234}	—	September 23, 2015	Haleakala	Pan-STARRS 1	·	1.2 km	MPC · JPL
759857	2008 CV_{235}	—	August 2, 2016	Haleakala	Pan-STARRS 1	URS	2.2 km	MPC · JPL
759858	2008 CG_{236}	—	February 10, 2008	Mount Lemmon	Mount Lemmon Survey	(2076)	660 m	MPC · JPL
759859	2008 CK_{236}	—	February 21, 2017	Haleakala	Pan-STARRS 1	·	1.4 km	MPC · JPL
759860	2008 CX_{236}	—	January 10, 2008	Kitt Peak	Spacewatch	·	830 m	MPC · JPL
759861	2008 CZ_{236}	—	February 9, 2008	Kitt Peak	Spacewatch	·	1.3 km	MPC · JPL
759862	2008 CA_{237}	—	April 10, 2013	Mount Lemmon	Mount Lemmon Survey	·	1.3 km	MPC · JPL
759863	2008 CM_{237}	—	February 14, 2008	Mount Lemmon	Mount Lemmon Survey	·	2.3 km	MPC · JPL
759864	2008 CJ_{238}	—	February 3, 2008	Kitt Peak	Spacewatch	·	1.4 km	MPC · JPL
759865	2008 CH_{239}	—	February 7, 2008	Kitt Peak	Spacewatch	·	840 m	MPC · JPL
759866	2008 CK_{239}	—	February 10, 2008	Mount Lemmon	Mount Lemmon Survey	·	1.2 km	MPC · JPL
759867	2008 CO_{239}	—	February 7, 2008	Mount Lemmon	Mount Lemmon Survey	·	890 m	MPC · JPL
759868	2008 CW_{240}	—	February 10, 2008	Kitt Peak	Spacewatch	·	1.4 km	MPC · JPL
759869	2008 CE_{241}	—	February 8, 2008	Mount Lemmon	Mount Lemmon Survey	NEM	1.7 km	MPC · JPL
759870	2008 CG_{241}	—	February 8, 2008	Kitt Peak	Spacewatch	·	1.1 km	MPC · JPL
759871	2008 CB_{245}	—	February 12, 2008	Kitt Peak	Spacewatch	·	1.4 km	MPC · JPL
759872	2008 CE_{245}	—	February 11, 2008	Mount Lemmon	Mount Lemmon Survey	·	2.7 km	MPC · JPL
759873	2008 CG_{245}	—	February 8, 2008	Mount Lemmon	Mount Lemmon Survey	·	1.2 km	MPC · JPL
759874	2008 CM_{245}	—	February 2, 2008	Mount Lemmon	Mount Lemmon Survey	·	750 m	MPC · JPL
759875	2008 CM_{248}	—	February 12, 2008	Kitt Peak	Spacewatch	·	1.8 km	MPC · JPL
759876	2008 CD_{249}	—	February 9, 2008	Mount Lemmon	Mount Lemmon Survey	V	440 m	MPC · JPL
759877	2008 CF_{249}	—	February 13, 2008	Mount Lemmon	Mount Lemmon Survey	·	1.3 km	MPC · JPL
759878	2008 DW_{10}	—	January 10, 2008	Kitt Peak	Spacewatch	V	420 m	MPC · JPL
759879	2008 DC_{22}	—	February 28, 2008	Mount Lemmon	Mount Lemmon Survey	MAR	790 m	MPC · JPL
759880	2008 DJ_{31}	—	January 11, 2008	Mount Lemmon	Mount Lemmon Survey	·	480 m	MPC · JPL
759881	2008 DG_{51}	—	January 19, 2008	Mount Lemmon	Mount Lemmon Survey	·	1.1 km	MPC · JPL
759882	2008 DP_{56}	—	February 13, 2008	Kitt Peak	Spacewatch	H	360 m	MPC · JPL
759883	2008 DE_{60}	—	February 9, 2008	Kitt Peak	Spacewatch	·	2.6 km	MPC · JPL
759884	2008 DE_{75}	—	February 28, 2008	Mount Lemmon	Mount Lemmon Survey	·	1.0 km	MPC · JPL
759885	2008 DD_{80}	—	February 27, 2008	Catalina	CSS	·	1.1 km	MPC · JPL
759886	2008 DJ_{89}	—	February 28, 2008	Kitt Peak	Spacewatch	·	1.8 km	MPC · JPL
759887	2008 DP_{90}	—	February 28, 2008	Mount Lemmon	Mount Lemmon Survey	MAS	550 m	MPC · JPL
759888	2008 DF_{91}	—	February 28, 2008	Kitt Peak	Spacewatch	NYS	700 m	MPC · JPL
759889	2008 DJ_{91}	—	February 29, 2008	Mount Lemmon	Mount Lemmon Survey	·	550 m	MPC · JPL
759890	2008 DA_{92}	—	February 28, 2008	Kitt Peak	Spacewatch	·	510 m	MPC · JPL
759891	2008 DB_{92}	—	December 2, 2010	Mount Lemmon	Mount Lemmon Survey	·	820 m	MPC · JPL
759892	2008 DF_{92}	—	April 12, 2013	Haleakala	Pan-STARRS 1	·	1.4 km	MPC · JPL
759893	2008 DM_{92}	—	February 1, 2012	Kitt Peak	Spacewatch	MAR	830 m	MPC · JPL
759894	2008 DH_{93}	—	February 28, 2008	Mount Lemmon	Mount Lemmon Survey	·	1.5 km	MPC · JPL
759895	2008 DP_{93}	—	July 25, 2014	Haleakala	Pan-STARRS 1	·	1.6 km	MPC · JPL
759896	2008 DV_{93}	—	January 21, 2015	Haleakala	Pan-STARRS 1	·	550 m	MPC · JPL
759897	2008 DD_{94}	—	February 26, 2008	Mount Lemmon	Mount Lemmon Survey	·	530 m	MPC · JPL
759898	2008 DW_{94}	—	August 26, 2013	Haleakala	Pan-STARRS 1	·	660 m	MPC · JPL
759899	2008 DK_{95}	—	February 26, 2008	Mount Lemmon	Mount Lemmon Survey	(5)	1.1 km	MPC · JPL
759900	2008 DC_{97}	—	February 28, 2008	Mount Lemmon	Mount Lemmon Survey	·	600 m	MPC · JPL

== 759901–760000 ==
back to top

Designation			Discovery			Properties		Ref
Permanent	Provisional	Named after	Date	Site	Discoverer(s)	Category	Diam.	Ref
759901	2008 EQ_{2}	—	January 13, 2008	Kitt Peak	Spacewatch	·	1.2 km	MPC · JPL
759902	2008 EO_{3}	—	March 1, 2008	Mount Lemmon	Mount Lemmon Survey	·	1.0 km	MPC · JPL
759903	2008 EP_{19}	—	March 2, 2008	Kitt Peak	Spacewatch	AGN	1.0 km	MPC · JPL
759904	2008 EP_{24}	—	March 3, 2008	Mount Lemmon	Mount Lemmon Survey	·	590 m	MPC · JPL
759905	2008 EQ_{24}	—	March 3, 2008	Mount Lemmon	Mount Lemmon Survey	·	1.5 km	MPC · JPL
759906	2008 EW_{33}	—	March 1, 2008	Mount Lemmon	Mount Lemmon Survey	·	1.4 km	MPC · JPL
759907	2008 EM_{38}	—	March 4, 2008	Kitt Peak	Spacewatch	·	1.4 km	MPC · JPL
759908	2008 EU_{39}	—	March 4, 2008	Kitt Peak	Spacewatch	·	900 m	MPC · JPL
759909	2008 EP_{50}	—	February 28, 2008	Mount Lemmon	Mount Lemmon Survey	·	1.8 km	MPC · JPL
759910	2008 EG_{59}	—	March 8, 2008	Mount Lemmon	Mount Lemmon Survey	·	2.1 km	MPC · JPL
759911	2008 EC_{66}	—	March 9, 2008	Mount Lemmon	Mount Lemmon Survey	·	1.4 km	MPC · JPL
759912	2008 EZ_{66}	—	February 29, 2008	Mount Lemmon	Mount Lemmon Survey	·	1.6 km	MPC · JPL
759913	2008 EP_{95}	—	March 6, 2008	Mount Lemmon	Mount Lemmon Survey	·	2.2 km	MPC · JPL
759914	2008 EZ_{95}	—	March 6, 2008	Mount Lemmon	Mount Lemmon Survey	·	1.1 km	MPC · JPL
759915	2008 EM_{102}	—	February 11, 2008	Mount Lemmon	Mount Lemmon Survey	·	1.2 km	MPC · JPL
759916	2008 EF_{113}	—	November 30, 2003	Kitt Peak	Spacewatch	·	550 m	MPC · JPL
759917	2008 EO_{113}	—	March 8, 2008	Mount Lemmon	Mount Lemmon Survey	BRA	1.3 km	MPC · JPL
759918	2008 EG_{119}	—	March 9, 2008	Mount Lemmon	Mount Lemmon Survey	·	1.2 km	MPC · JPL
759919	2008 EA_{124}	—	March 10, 2008	Kitt Peak	Spacewatch	DOR	1.6 km	MPC · JPL
759920	2008 EJ_{136}	—	February 28, 2008	Kitt Peak	Spacewatch	NYS	760 m	MPC · JPL
759921	2008 EY_{136}	—	March 11, 2008	Kitt Peak	Spacewatch	·	1.5 km	MPC · JPL
759922	2008 EX_{137}	—	March 11, 2008	Mount Lemmon	Mount Lemmon Survey	·	1.3 km	MPC · JPL
759923	2008 ER_{139}	—	March 11, 2008	Kitt Peak	Spacewatch	·	1.5 km	MPC · JPL
759924	2008 ER_{140}	—	March 12, 2008	Kitt Peak	Spacewatch	·	610 m	MPC · JPL
759925	2008 EO_{156}	—	March 8, 2008	Mount Lemmon	Mount Lemmon Survey	·	1.2 km	MPC · JPL
759926	2008 ET_{158}	—	March 11, 2008	Kitt Peak	Spacewatch	·	690 m	MPC · JPL
759927	2008 EX_{161}	—	March 10, 2008	Mount Lemmon	Mount Lemmon Survey	GEF	910 m	MPC · JPL
759928	2008 EM_{164}	—	March 11, 2008	Kitt Peak	Spacewatch	·	1.2 km	MPC · JPL
759929	2008 EE_{171}	—	March 4, 2008	Kitt Peak	Spacewatch	H	320 m	MPC · JPL
759930	2008 EW_{171}	—	March 12, 2008	Kitt Peak	Spacewatch	THB	2.0 km	MPC · JPL
759931	2008 EO_{173}	—	March 12, 2008	Mount Lemmon	Mount Lemmon Survey	·	640 m	MPC · JPL
759932	2008 EN_{175}	—	January 16, 2015	Haleakala	Pan-STARRS 1	·	950 m	MPC · JPL
759933	2008 EB_{176}	—	March 1, 2008	Kitt Peak	Spacewatch	·	1.5 km	MPC · JPL
759934	2008 EX_{176}	—	January 29, 2015	Haleakala	Pan-STARRS 1	·	530 m	MPC · JPL
759935	2008 ED_{177}	—	March 6, 2013	Haleakala	Pan-STARRS 1	·	1.6 km	MPC · JPL
759936	2008 EE_{177}	—	April 23, 2015	Haleakala	Pan-STARRS 1	·	540 m	MPC · JPL
759937	2008 EZ_{177}	—	March 5, 2008	Mount Lemmon	Mount Lemmon Survey	·	1.5 km	MPC · JPL
759938	2008 EB_{179}	—	December 8, 2010	Kitt Peak	Spacewatch	·	660 m	MPC · JPL
759939	2008 EM_{179}	—	March 6, 2008	Mount Lemmon	Mount Lemmon Survey	·	420 m	MPC · JPL
759940	2008 EB_{180}	—	January 21, 2012	Kitt Peak	Spacewatch	·	1.3 km	MPC · JPL
759941	2008 EG_{180}	—	March 1, 2008	Kitt Peak	Spacewatch	HNS	830 m	MPC · JPL
759942	2008 EO_{180}	—	March 11, 2008	Mount Lemmon	Mount Lemmon Survey	·	1.3 km	MPC · JPL
759943	2008 EP_{180}	—	March 13, 2008	Mount Lemmon	Mount Lemmon Survey	·	510 m	MPC · JPL
759944	2008 EZ_{180}	—	March 10, 2008	Kitt Peak	Spacewatch	·	1.5 km	MPC · JPL
759945	2008 ED_{182}	—	March 11, 2008	Mount Lemmon	Mount Lemmon Survey	·	800 m	MPC · JPL
759946	2008 EJ_{182}	—	November 12, 2015	Mount Lemmon	Mount Lemmon Survey	·	1.1 km	MPC · JPL
759947	2008 EQ_{182}	—	October 1, 2010	Mount Lemmon	Mount Lemmon Survey	·	620 m	MPC · JPL
759948	2008 EE_{183}	—	November 1, 2015	Mount Lemmon	Mount Lemmon Survey	·	1.1 km	MPC · JPL
759949	2008 EH_{184}	—	November 6, 2010	Mount Lemmon	Mount Lemmon Survey	·	550 m	MPC · JPL
759950	2008 EQ_{186}	—	February 17, 2015	Haleakala	Pan-STARRS 1	·	590 m	MPC · JPL
759951	2008 EB_{187}	—	April 5, 2014	Haleakala	Pan-STARRS 1	·	2.1 km	MPC · JPL
759952	2008 ED_{187}	—	March 2, 2008	Mount Lemmon	Mount Lemmon Survey	·	2.2 km	MPC · JPL
759953	2008 EJ_{187}	—	March 5, 2008	Mount Lemmon	Mount Lemmon Survey	·	710 m	MPC · JPL
759954	2008 EK_{188}	—	October 9, 2015	Haleakala	Pan-STARRS 1	·	1.4 km	MPC · JPL
759955	2008 EP_{188}	—	October 24, 2011	Haleakala	Pan-STARRS 1	·	1.6 km	MPC · JPL
759956	2008 EA_{189}	—	March 1, 2008	Kitt Peak	Spacewatch	·	1.5 km	MPC · JPL
759957	2008 EP_{189}	—	July 14, 2016	Haleakala	Pan-STARRS 1	·	2.3 km	MPC · JPL
759958	2008 EZ_{189}	—	March 4, 2008	Mount Lemmon	Mount Lemmon Survey	·	1.3 km	MPC · JPL
759959	2008 EH_{190}	—	March 5, 2008	Mount Lemmon	Mount Lemmon Survey	·	2.3 km	MPC · JPL
759960	2008 EN_{190}	—	March 10, 2008	Kitt Peak	Spacewatch	MRX	750 m	MPC · JPL
759961	2008 EU_{190}	—	March 10, 2008	Kitt Peak	Spacewatch	·	1.1 km	MPC · JPL
759962	2008 EH_{191}	—	March 10, 2008	Kitt Peak	Spacewatch	·	1.6 km	MPC · JPL
759963	2008 EO_{192}	—	March 6, 2008	Mount Lemmon	Mount Lemmon Survey	·	650 m	MPC · JPL
759964	2008 ER_{192}	—	March 5, 2008	Mount Lemmon	Mount Lemmon Survey	·	1.2 km	MPC · JPL
759965	2008 EJ_{195}	—	March 2, 2008	Mount Lemmon	Mount Lemmon Survey	·	2.9 km	MPC · JPL
759966	2008 EO_{195}	—	March 11, 2008	Kitt Peak	Spacewatch	·	850 m	MPC · JPL
759967	2008 EV_{197}	—	March 4, 2008	Kitt Peak	Spacewatch	·	590 m	MPC · JPL
759968	2008 EB_{199}	—	March 1, 2008	Mount Lemmon	Mount Lemmon Survey	EUP	3.0 km	MPC · JPL
759969	2008 FC_{1}	—	March 2, 2008	Kitt Peak	Spacewatch	·	700 m	MPC · JPL
759970	2008 FT_{1}	—	February 28, 2008	Kitt Peak	Spacewatch	·	1.3 km	MPC · JPL
759971	2008 FM_{4}	—	January 11, 2008	Mount Lemmon	Mount Lemmon Survey	·	600 m	MPC · JPL
759972	2008 FT_{11}	—	February 8, 2008	Kitt Peak	Spacewatch	·	1.3 km	MPC · JPL
759973	2008 FW_{20}	—	March 27, 2008	Kitt Peak	Spacewatch	·	1.3 km	MPC · JPL
759974	2008 FT_{30}	—	March 6, 2008	Kitt Peak	Spacewatch	·	540 m	MPC · JPL
759975	2008 FO_{36}	—	October 20, 2006	Kitt Peak	Spacewatch	·	1.0 km	MPC · JPL
759976	2008 FA_{48}	—	February 13, 2008	Mount Lemmon	Mount Lemmon Survey	·	620 m	MPC · JPL
759977	2008 FU_{80}	—	March 10, 2008	Kitt Peak	Spacewatch	·	670 m	MPC · JPL
759978	2008 FR_{86}	—	February 28, 2008	Kitt Peak	Spacewatch	·	1.6 km	MPC · JPL
759979	2008 FP_{88}	—	March 28, 2008	Mount Lemmon	Mount Lemmon Survey	·	1.8 km	MPC · JPL
759980	2008 FH_{93}	—	March 29, 2008	Mount Lemmon	Mount Lemmon Survey	HOF	1.9 km	MPC · JPL
759981	2008 FE_{94}	—	March 29, 2008	Kitt Peak	Spacewatch	·	740 m	MPC · JPL
759982	2008 FK_{95}	—	March 29, 2008	Mount Lemmon	Mount Lemmon Survey	·	770 m	MPC · JPL
759983	2008 FW_{121}	—	March 10, 2008	Mount Lemmon	Mount Lemmon Survey	·	630 m	MPC · JPL
759984	2008 FV_{122}	—	March 27, 2008	Kitt Peak	Spacewatch	·	540 m	MPC · JPL
759985	2008 FF_{132}	—	March 26, 2008	Mount Lemmon	Mount Lemmon Survey	·	720 m	MPC · JPL
759986	2008 FM_{136}	—	March 28, 2008	Kitt Peak	Spacewatch	·	620 m	MPC · JPL
759987	2008 FH_{139}	—	March 31, 2008	Kitt Peak	Spacewatch	NYS	730 m	MPC · JPL
759988	2008 FU_{140}	—	March 21, 2015	Haleakala	Pan-STARRS 1	·	540 m	MPC · JPL
759989	2008 FB_{142}	—	February 20, 2015	Haleakala	Pan-STARRS 1	PHO	830 m	MPC · JPL
759990	2008 FK_{142}	—	August 28, 2016	Mount Lemmon	Mount Lemmon Survey	·	870 m	MPC · JPL
759991	2008 FW_{144}	—	March 29, 2008	Kitt Peak	Spacewatch	·	1.6 km	MPC · JPL
759992	2008 FY_{144}	—	March 28, 2008	Mount Lemmon	Mount Lemmon Survey	·	1.2 km	MPC · JPL
759993	2008 FZ_{144}	—	February 10, 2008	Mount Lemmon	Mount Lemmon Survey	·	570 m	MPC · JPL
759994	2008 FD_{145}	—	March 31, 2008	Kitt Peak	Spacewatch	·	1.4 km	MPC · JPL
759995	2008 FH_{147}	—	March 31, 2008	Mount Lemmon	Mount Lemmon Survey	·	1.4 km	MPC · JPL
759996	2008 GB_{7}	—	April 1, 2008	Kitt Peak	Spacewatch	MAS	550 m	MPC · JPL
759997	2008 GS_{12}	—	March 12, 2008	Mount Lemmon	Mount Lemmon Survey	EOS	1.5 km	MPC · JPL
759998	2008 GM_{13}	—	April 3, 2008	Mount Lemmon	Mount Lemmon Survey	MAS	570 m	MPC · JPL
759999	2008 GU_{13}	—	April 3, 2008	Mount Lemmon	Mount Lemmon Survey	·	1.4 km	MPC · JPL
760000	2008 GD_{22}	—	April 1, 2008	Kitt Peak	Spacewatch	·	1.1 km	MPC · JPL

back to top
