= Musket Ball Cluster =

Collision of two galaxy clusters in the constellation Cancer

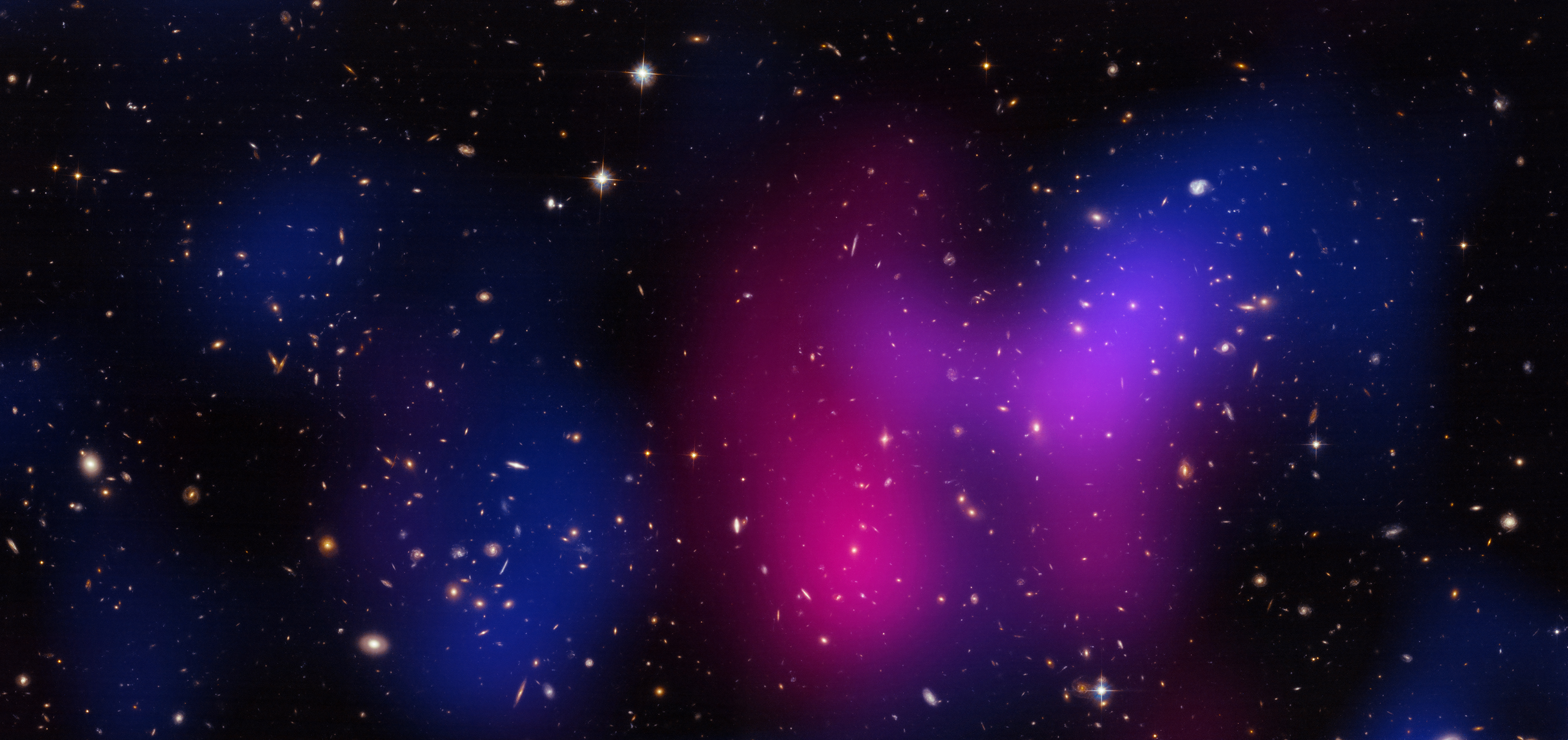

Observation data (Epoch J2000.0)
- Constellation(s): Cancer
- Right ascension: 09^{h} 16^{m} 10.9^{s}
- Declination: +29° 48′ 44″
- Redshift: 0.53

Other designations
- Musket Ball Cluster, DLSCL J0916.2+2951, SHELS J0916.2+2949

The Musket Ball Cluster (DLSCL J0916.2+2951) is a galaxy cluster that exhibits separation between its baryonic matter and dark matter components. The cluster is a recent merger of two galaxy clusters. It is named after the Bullet Cluster, as it is a slower collision, and older than the Bullet Cluster. This cluster is further along the process of merger than the Bullet Cluster, being some 500 million years older, at 700 million years old. The cluster was discovered in 2011 by the Deep Lens Survey. As of 2012, it is one of the few galaxy clusters to show a separation between its dark matter and baryonic matter components.

== Characteristics ==
As of 2012, it is one of seven galaxy clusters that exhibit a separation of dark matter and baryonic matter following cluster collision and merger. The separation between the galaxies and their dark matter components is on average 19,000 light-years (5,800 pc). This separation may indicate that dark matter may interact with itself, through a dark force (a force that only interacts with dark matter) or a set of dark forces. The galaxy cluster itself is some 8 million light-years (2.5 Mpc) across.

== See also ==
- Bullet Group

Other dissociative galaxy cluster mergers known at the time of discovery

- Bullet Cluster (2006)
- MACS J0025.4-1222 (2008)
- Abell 520 (2007)
- Abell 2744 (2011)
- Abell 2163 (2011)
- Abell 1759 (2011)
