= Bullet Group =

Merging galaxy group

Observation data (Epoch J2000.0)
- Constellation(s): Hydra
- Right ascension: 08^{h} 54^{m} 46.5480^{s}
- Declination: −01° 21′ 37.262″
- Redshift: 0.351
- Binding mass: (2.4±0.6)×10^{14} M_{☉}

Other designations
- Bullet Group, SL2S J08544-0121

The Bullet Group (SL2S J08544-0121) is a newly merging group of galaxies, a merger between two galaxy groups to form a new larger one, that recently had a high speed collision between the two component groups. The group exhibits separation between its dark matter and baryonic matter components. The galaxies occur in two clumps, while the gas has expanded into a billowing cloud encompassing all three clumps. As of 2014, it is one of the few galaxy clusters known to show separation between the dark matter and baryonic matter components. The group is named after the Bullet Cluster, a similar merging galaxy cluster, except on a smaller scale, being of groups instead of clusters. The bimodal distribution of galaxies was found at discovery in 2008. The galaxy group is a gravitational lens and strongly lenses a more distant galaxy behind it, at z=~1.2

== Characteristics ==
As of 2014, the group is the smallest mass object to exhibit separation between its dark matter and baryonic matter components.

The galaxy group is dominated by one elliptical galaxy, situated in one of the two concentrations, while the other node has two large bright galaxies, which do not dominate the group. The group has an apparent radius of 200 arcseconds, and a virial radius of 1 megaparsec.

== See also ==
- Musket Ball Cluster
