= Deep Lens Survey =

Gravitational lensing survey

- Alternative names: "Deep Gravitational Lensing Survey"

Minor planets discovered: 79
see § List of discovered minor planets

The Deep Lens Survey (DLS, short for "Deep Gravitational Lensing Survey") is an ultra-deep multi-band optical survey of seven 4 square degree fields. Mosaic CCD imagers at the National Optical Astronomy Observatory's Blanco (Cerro Tololo) and Mayall telescopes (Kitt Peak) are being used. The deep fields took five years to complete (2001–2006), in four bands: B, V, R, and z', to 29/29/29/28 mag per square arcsecond surface brightness. Optical transient events (including moving objects such as minor planets and comets) and supernova candidates are released in real time.

== Survey ==
The main goal of the survey is to produce unbiased maps of the large-scale structure of the mass distribution beyond the local universe, via very deep multicolor imaging of seven 2-degree fields and colour-redshifts. The shear of distant galaxies induced by the mass of foreground structures will be measured. These weak-lensing observations are sensitive to all forms of clumped mass and will yield unbiased mass maps with resolution of one arcmin in the plane of the sky (about 120 kpc/h at z = 0.2), in multiple redshift ranges. These maps will measure for the first time the change in large scale structure from z = 1 to the present epoch, and test the current theories of structure formation, which predict that mass in the low-redshift universe has a particular filamentary/sheetlike structure. These observations will directly constrain the clustering properties of matter, and, when compared with the results from microwave background anisotropy missions, will test the basic theory of structure formation via gravitational instability.

While this is the main goal of the survey, a wide-field imaging survey has a myriad of other uses. In addition, the group is acquiring the data in a way which makes it possible to detect variable objects on scales of hours to months, by spreading observations of individual subfields over 4 runs over two years.

== Discoveries ==
=== List of discovered minor planets ===
(46060) 2001 DL_{88}	26 February 2001	list
(89886) 2002 CT_{230}	14 February 2002	list
(104314) 2000 EC_{203}	5 March 2000	list
(107558) 2001 DK_{85}	23 February 2001	list
(107868) 2001 FT_{85}	26 March 2001	list
(114722) 2003 GN_{33}	3 April 2003	list
(143352) 2003 AB_{85}	7 January 2003	list
(144688) 2004 FG_{145}	29 March 2004	list
(147428) 2003 GM_{54}	1 April 2003	list
(148990) 2001 YX_{92}	17 December 2001	list
(154544) 2003 GP_{33}	4 April 2003	list
(156423) 2002 AD_{92}	12 January 2002	list
(159758) 2003 FZ_{122}	31 March 2003	list
(160842) 2000 YE_{142}	21 December 2000	list
(189839) 2003 AQ_{83}	4 January 2003	list
(193671) 2001 DV_{84}	23 February 2001	list
(196401) 2003 GM_{33}	3 April 2003	list
(205413) 2001 FX_{85}	26 March 2001	list
(208544) 2002 AE_{92}	12 January 2002	list
(216501) 2000 EP_{203}	5 March 2000	list
(220530) 2004 FT_{18}	26 March 2004	list
(223271) 2003 GY_{32}	1 April 2003	list
(223272) 2003 GC_{33}	1 April 2003	list
(226345) 2003 FM_{122}	31 March 2003	list
(231056) 2005 JG_{63}	3 May 2005	list

(231914) 2000 YT_{140}	19 December 2000	list
(242393) 2004 FO_{18}	26 March 2004	list
(242599) 2005 JG_{45}	2 May 2005	list
(244218) 2002 AA_{93}	14 January 2002	list
(245421) 2005 JW_{63}	4 May 2005	list
(245431) 2005 JX_{108}	6 May 2005	list
(252143) 2000 YK_{141}	20 December 2000	list
(257954) 2000 YY_{141}	20 December 2000	list
(264468) 2001 FY_{85}	26 March 2001	list
(267852) 2003 UJ_{283}	30 October 2003	list
(270019) 2001 FA_{86}	26 March 2001	list
(270473) 2002 DV_{4}	17 February 2002	list
(275636) 2000 EJ_{203}	5 March 2000	list
(283757) 2003 EU_{61}	8 March 2003	list
(285797) 2000 WN_{193}	24 November 2000	list
(285835) 2001 DW_{83}	23 February 2001	list
(287594) 2003 FK_{122}	31 March 2003	list
(297152) 2010 UQ_{56}	14 February 2002	list
(301831) 2011 QH_{14}	5 March 2000	list
(302421) 2002 CU_{230}	14 February 2002	list
(302806) 2003 AH_{83}	4 January 2003	list
(302864) 2003 GJ_{54}	1 April 2003	list
(306179) 2010 WA_{55}	2 April 2003	list
(306339) 2011 SQ_{129}	5 January 2003	list
(306581) 2000 ED_{204}	6 March 2000	list

(317662) 2003 FY_{122}	31 March 2003	list
(318601) 2005 JX_{45}	3 May 2005	list
(321876) 2010 SG_{7}	23 February 2001	list
(337289) 2000 WL_{194}	25 November 2000	list
(338450) 2003 EG_{55}	9 March 2003	list
(348151) 2004 FS_{18}	26 March 2004	list
(354650) 2005 JR_{45}	3 May 2005	list
(357315) 2003 FL_{122}	31 March 2003	list
(360809) 2005 JH_{63}	3 May 2005	list
(365944) 2012 AZ_{16}	9 March 2003	list
(368103) 2013 EN	3 May 2005	list
(370195) 2002 CU_{231}	15 February 2002	list
(370686) 2004 FS_{123}	26 March 2004	list
(385437) 2003 GH_{55}	1 April 2003	list
(393559) 2003 GO_{33}	3 April 2003	list
(397214) 2006 GU_{37}	2 April 2006	list
(415789) 2000 WO_{193}	24 November 2000	list
(416827) 2005 JU_{45}	3 May 2005	list
(416834) 2005 JY_{108}	6 May 2005	list
(416835) 2005 JA_{109}	6 May 2005	list
(427831) 2005 JQ_{108}	4 May 2005	list
(434011) 2000 YU_{140}	19 December 2000	list
(455743) 2005 JV_{45}	3 May 2005	list
(461503) 2003 FJ_{122}	31 March 2003	list
(461672) 2005 JM_{22}	6 May 2005	list

(464869) 2005 JL_{22}	4 May 2005	list
(464881) 2005 JF_{177}	5 May 2005	list
(468500) 2005 JR_{108}	6 May 2005	list
(481053) 2005 JP_{45}	3 May 2005	list

=== Galaxy clusters ===
Significant discoveries
Cluster	Date	Notes	Names	Refs
DLSCL J0916.2+2951	2012	This is a dissociative galaxy cluster merger with a large separation between the baryonic and dark matter components.	Musket Ball Cluster	
