= List of minor planets: 739001–740000 =

The following is a partial list of minor planets, running from minor-planet number 739001 through 740000, inclusive. The primary data for this and other partial lists is based on JPL's "Small-Body Orbital Elements" and data available from the Minor Planet Center. Critical list information is also provided by the MPC, unless otherwise specified from Lowell Observatory. A detailed description of the table's columns and additional sources are given on the main page including a complete list of every page in this series, and a statistical break-up on the dynamical classification of minor planets.

Also see the summary list of all named bodies in numerical and alphabetical order, and the corresponding naming citations for the number range of this particular list. New namings may only be added to this list after official publication, as the preannouncement of names is condemned by the Working Group for Small Bodies Nomenclature of the International Astronomical Union.

Near-Earth obj.	MBA (inner)	MBA (outer)	Centaur
Mars-crosser	MBA (middle)	Jupiter trojan	Trans-Neptunian obj.
Unclassified

== 739001–739100 ==
Designation			Discovery			Properties		Ref
Permanent	Provisional	Named after	Date	Site	Discoverer(s)	Category	Diam.	Ref
739001	2017 DG_{117}	—	November 19, 2009	Mount Lemmon	Mount Lemmon Survey	·	2.8 km	MPC · JPL
739002	2017 DW_{117}	—	January 13, 2010	WISE	WISE	·	3.2 km	MPC · JPL
739003	2017 DG_{118}	—	November 19, 2009	Mount Lemmon	Mount Lemmon Survey	·	3.4 km	MPC · JPL
739004	2017 DV_{118}	—	October 6, 2011	Catalina	CSS	JUN	1.1 km	MPC · JPL
739005	2017 DE_{120}	—	March 22, 2012	Mount Lemmon	Mount Lemmon Survey	·	1.8 km	MPC · JPL
739006	2017 DS_{120}	—	August 27, 2014	Haleakala	Pan-STARRS 1	·	1.7 km	MPC · JPL
739007	2017 DD_{123}	—	September 17, 2009	Kitt Peak	Spacewatch	·	1.6 km	MPC · JPL
739008	2017 DP_{130}	—	February 21, 2017	Mount Lemmon	Mount Lemmon Survey	·	1.5 km	MPC · JPL
739009	2017 DT_{130}	—	February 22, 2017	Haleakala	Pan-STARRS 1	EOS	1.4 km	MPC · JPL
739010	2017 DG_{132}	—	February 22, 2017	Mount Lemmon	Mount Lemmon Survey	·	1.6 km	MPC · JPL
739011	2017 DU_{141}	—	February 2, 2017	Haleakala	Pan-STARRS 1	·	2.4 km	MPC · JPL
739012	2017 DB_{147}	—	April 12, 2012	Haleakala	Pan-STARRS 1	·	1.7 km	MPC · JPL
739013	2017 DC_{155}	—	February 24, 2017	Haleakala	Pan-STARRS 1	·	1.5 km	MPC · JPL
739014	2017 EV_{7}	—	November 14, 2010	Mount Lemmon	Mount Lemmon Survey	·	2.6 km	MPC · JPL
739015	2017 EZ_{8}	—	September 28, 2009	Kitt Peak	Spacewatch	·	2.5 km	MPC · JPL
739016	2017 EA_{9}	—	October 2, 2015	Mount Lemmon	Mount Lemmon Survey	·	560 m	MPC · JPL
739017	2017 EG_{10}	—	January 27, 2010	WISE	WISE	·	2.8 km	MPC · JPL
739018	2017 EL_{10}	—	January 13, 2005	Kitt Peak	Spacewatch	T_{j} (2.98)	2.9 km	MPC · JPL
739019	2017 ED_{11}	—	December 11, 1998	Kitt Peak	Spacewatch	T_{j} (2.99)	4.7 km	MPC · JPL
739020	2017 ED_{12}	—	March 4, 2017	Mount Lemmon	Mount Lemmon Survey	H	470 m	MPC · JPL
739021	2017 EX_{12}	—	February 24, 2006	Kitt Peak	Spacewatch	·	3.0 km	MPC · JPL
739022	2017 EX_{13}	—	January 25, 2012	Haleakala	Pan-STARRS 1	·	2.1 km	MPC · JPL
739023	2017 ES_{14}	—	July 19, 2010	WISE	WISE	·	2.8 km	MPC · JPL
739024	2017 EW_{14}	—	January 20, 2001	Kitt Peak	Spacewatch	EOS	1.9 km	MPC · JPL
739025	2017 EY_{14}	—	May 10, 2010	WISE	WISE	·	1.7 km	MPC · JPL
739026	2017 EA_{15}	—	January 21, 2010	WISE	WISE	·	2.9 km	MPC · JPL
739027	2017 ET_{15}	—	February 21, 2010	WISE	WISE	·	4.5 km	MPC · JPL
739028	2017 EW_{16}	—	March 4, 2006	Kitt Peak	Spacewatch	·	2.1 km	MPC · JPL
739029	2017 ED_{17}	—	April 30, 2003	Kitt Peak	Spacewatch	·	960 m	MPC · JPL
739030	2017 EG_{17}	—	March 11, 2008	Mount Lemmon	Mount Lemmon Survey	·	3.1 km	MPC · JPL
739031	2017 EZ_{17}	—	February 28, 2012	Haleakala	Pan-STARRS 1	EOS	1.5 km	MPC · JPL
739032	2017 EK_{19}	—	September 12, 2015	Haleakala	Pan-STARRS 1	·	1.7 km	MPC · JPL
739033	2017 ET_{19}	—	February 2, 2010	WISE	WISE	·	4.7 km	MPC · JPL
739034	2017 EK_{20}	—	April 14, 2007	Kitt Peak	Spacewatch	·	2.4 km	MPC · JPL
739035	2017 EU_{20}	—	February 20, 2009	Mount Lemmon	Mount Lemmon Survey	·	1.1 km	MPC · JPL
739036	2017 EY_{21}	—	February 2, 2010	WISE	WISE	·	3.2 km	MPC · JPL
739037	2017 EF_{22}	—	March 1, 2010	WISE	WISE	·	4.3 km	MPC · JPL
739038	2017 EL_{22}	—	October 2, 1997	Caussols	ODAS	·	3.7 km	MPC · JPL
739039	2017 EY_{22}	—	June 17, 2007	Kitt Peak	Spacewatch	H	470 m	MPC · JPL
739040	2017 EY_{23}	—	July 23, 2010	WISE	WISE	·	2.4 km	MPC · JPL
739041	2017 EX_{24}	—	March 30, 2011	Mount Lemmon	Mount Lemmon Survey	·	2.6 km	MPC · JPL
739042	2017 EV_{28}	—	April 25, 2010	WISE	WISE	LUT	3.6 km	MPC · JPL
739043	2017 EJ_{31}	—	March 5, 2017	Haleakala	Pan-STARRS 1	·	2.1 km	MPC · JPL
739044	2017 FP_{3}	—	October 10, 2015	Haleakala	Pan-STARRS 1	(18466)	1.8 km	MPC · JPL
739045	2017 FX_{3}	—	September 21, 2003	Kitt Peak	Spacewatch	PHO	2.9 km	MPC · JPL
739046	2017 FG_{5}	—	April 9, 2010	Mount Lemmon	Mount Lemmon Survey	·	2.1 km	MPC · JPL
739047	2017 FU_{5}	—	March 13, 2010	Catalina	CSS	·	760 m	MPC · JPL
739048	2017 FA_{7}	—	September 26, 2006	Mount Lemmon	Mount Lemmon Survey	·	1.3 km	MPC · JPL
739049	2017 FW_{7}	—	February 21, 2017	Haleakala	Pan-STARRS 1	·	1.5 km	MPC · JPL
739050	2017 FM_{9}	—	January 29, 2010	WISE	WISE	·	3.6 km	MPC · JPL
739051	2017 FC_{10}	—	December 6, 2005	Mount Lemmon	Mount Lemmon Survey	·	2.2 km	MPC · JPL
739052	2017 FD_{10}	—	March 25, 2007	Mount Lemmon	Mount Lemmon Survey	·	3.4 km	MPC · JPL
739053	2017 FL_{10}	—	December 6, 2015	Mount Lemmon	Mount Lemmon Survey	·	1.6 km	MPC · JPL
739054	2017 FV_{13}	—	April 12, 2010	WISE	WISE	·	1.7 km	MPC · JPL
739055	2017 FB_{14}	—	March 29, 2012	Haleakala	Pan-STARRS 1	·	2.2 km	MPC · JPL
739056	2017 FO_{14}	—	February 7, 2011	Mount Lemmon	Mount Lemmon Survey	·	2.0 km	MPC · JPL
739057	2017 FS_{15}	—	January 26, 2011	Mount Lemmon	Mount Lemmon Survey	·	2.6 km	MPC · JPL
739058	2017 FT_{16}	—	January 26, 2006	Mount Lemmon	Mount Lemmon Survey	·	960 m	MPC · JPL
739059	2017 FT_{19}	—	April 1, 2012	Mount Lemmon	Mount Lemmon Survey	·	1.8 km	MPC · JPL
739060	2017 FW_{19}	—	November 12, 2001	Apache Point	SDSS Collaboration	·	1.4 km	MPC · JPL
739061	2017 FM_{24}	—	February 20, 2010	WISE	WISE	3:2	4.8 km	MPC · JPL
739062	2017 FH_{25}	—	April 26, 2006	Kitt Peak	Spacewatch	·	2.9 km	MPC · JPL
739063	2017 FJ_{25}	—	March 31, 2008	Mount Lemmon	Mount Lemmon Survey	·	2.1 km	MPC · JPL
739064	2017 FR_{26}	—	July 6, 2010	WISE	WISE	·	1.7 km	MPC · JPL
739065	2017 FT_{26}	—	March 12, 2011	Mount Lemmon	Mount Lemmon Survey	·	2.8 km	MPC · JPL
739066	2017 FS_{27}	—	December 12, 2006	Kitt Peak	Spacewatch	·	1.6 km	MPC · JPL
739067	2017 FN_{28}	—	March 3, 2010	WISE	WISE	·	1.7 km	MPC · JPL
739068	2017 FY_{28}	—	January 26, 2006	Kitt Peak	Spacewatch	·	3.3 km	MPC · JPL
739069	2017 FD_{29}	—	April 15, 2013	Haleakala	Pan-STARRS 1	·	1.7 km	MPC · JPL
739070	2017 FT_{30}	—	February 21, 2017	Haleakala	Pan-STARRS 1	·	2.3 km	MPC · JPL
739071	2017 FD_{31}	—	April 3, 2008	Mount Lemmon	Mount Lemmon Survey	·	1.5 km	MPC · JPL
739072	2017 FA_{32}	—	January 6, 2008	Mauna Kea	P. A. Wiegert, A. M. Gilbert	·	1.0 km	MPC · JPL
739073	2017 FL_{33}	—	October 22, 2014	Mount Lemmon	Mount Lemmon Survey	EOS	1.7 km	MPC · JPL
739074	2017 FN_{33}	—	September 24, 2008	Kitt Peak	Spacewatch	·	2.1 km	MPC · JPL
739075	2017 FX_{36}	—	February 9, 2005	La Silla	A. Boattini, H. Scholl	VER	2.3 km	MPC · JPL
739076	2017 FO_{38}	—	November 12, 2015	Mount Lemmon	Mount Lemmon Survey	·	2.7 km	MPC · JPL
739077	2017 FL_{39}	—	March 14, 2007	Kitt Peak	Spacewatch	EOS	1.4 km	MPC · JPL
739078	2017 FO_{41}	—	March 25, 2010	Kitt Peak	Spacewatch	·	1.8 km	MPC · JPL
739079	2017 FG_{42}	—	October 19, 2003	Apache Point	SDSS Collaboration	·	2.5 km	MPC · JPL
739080	2017 FY_{42}	—	November 17, 2004	Campo Imperatore	CINEOS	·	4.6 km	MPC · JPL
739081	2017 FB_{43}	—	January 11, 2011	Mount Lemmon	Mount Lemmon Survey	·	2.7 km	MPC · JPL
739082	2017 FD_{43}	—	February 18, 2010	WISE	WISE	·	2.6 km	MPC · JPL
739083	2017 FO_{43}	—	November 17, 2006	Mount Lemmon	Mount Lemmon Survey	·	3.1 km	MPC · JPL
739084	2017 FE_{44}	—	October 12, 1998	Kitt Peak	Spacewatch	·	2.9 km	MPC · JPL
739085	2017 FF_{44}	—	November 12, 2001	Apache Point	SDSS Collaboration	·	2.0 km	MPC · JPL
739086	2017 FH_{44}	—	March 15, 2012	Kitt Peak	Spacewatch	·	2.5 km	MPC · JPL
739087	2017 FT_{45}	—	February 24, 2012	Pla D'Arguines	R. Ferrando, Ferrando, M.	·	1.7 km	MPC · JPL
739088	2017 FV_{45}	—	November 6, 2009	Catalina	CSS	EOS	2.8 km	MPC · JPL
739089	2017 FS_{46}	—	January 4, 2006	Mount Lemmon	Mount Lemmon Survey	·	3.8 km	MPC · JPL
739090	2017 FR_{47}	—	July 8, 2014	Haleakala	Pan-STARRS 1	NYS	840 m	MPC · JPL
739091	2017 FV_{48}	—	January 23, 2010	WISE	WISE	ERI	2.0 km	MPC · JPL
739092	2017 FJ_{50}	—	March 25, 2006	Mount Lemmon	Mount Lemmon Survey	·	3.0 km	MPC · JPL
739093	2017 FL_{50}	—	April 24, 2000	Kitt Peak	Spacewatch	·	3.2 km	MPC · JPL
739094	2017 FU_{50}	—	October 24, 2009	Kitt Peak	Spacewatch	·	3.7 km	MPC · JPL
739095	2017 FH_{52}	—	May 15, 2009	Mount Lemmon	Mount Lemmon Survey	EUN	1.2 km	MPC · JPL
739096	2017 FL_{53}	—	February 6, 2010	WISE	WISE	EUP	4.4 km	MPC · JPL
739097	2017 FV_{55}	—	February 24, 2017	Haleakala	Pan-STARRS 1	EOS	1.6 km	MPC · JPL
739098	2017 FN_{56}	—	November 11, 2001	Apache Point	SDSS Collaboration	·	4.5 km	MPC · JPL
739099	2017 FJ_{60}	—	October 24, 2009	Kitt Peak	Spacewatch	·	2.0 km	MPC · JPL
739100	2017 FT_{60}	—	December 14, 2015	Haleakala	Pan-STARRS 1	·	1.6 km	MPC · JPL

== 739101–739200 ==
back to top

Designation			Discovery			Properties		Ref
Permanent	Provisional	Named after	Date	Site	Discoverer(s)	Category	Diam.	Ref
739101	2017 FP_{65}	—	March 19, 2007	Mount Lemmon	Mount Lemmon Survey	EOS	1.9 km	MPC · JPL
739102	2017 FQ_{65}	—	June 18, 2013	Haleakala	Pan-STARRS 1	·	1.6 km	MPC · JPL
739103	2017 FB_{66}	—	September 22, 2014	Haleakala	Pan-STARRS 1	·	2.1 km	MPC · JPL
739104	2017 FB_{68}	—	July 12, 2010	WISE	WISE	·	2.0 km	MPC · JPL
739105	2017 FK_{69}	—	September 29, 2005	Mount Lemmon	Mount Lemmon Survey	BRA	1.1 km	MPC · JPL
739106	2017 FN_{69}	—	January 2, 2012	Mount Lemmon	Mount Lemmon Survey	·	1.4 km	MPC · JPL
739107	2017 FR_{69}	—	March 11, 2008	Mount Lemmon	Mount Lemmon Survey	·	1.5 km	MPC · JPL
739108	2017 FZ_{69}	—	September 28, 2003	Kitt Peak	Spacewatch	·	2.1 km	MPC · JPL
739109	2017 FP_{70}	—	May 11, 2010	Mount Lemmon	Mount Lemmon Survey	·	960 m	MPC · JPL
739110	2017 FQ_{71}	—	November 7, 2005	Mauna Kea	A. Boattini	·	1.7 km	MPC · JPL
739111	2017 FD_{74}	—	February 11, 2010	WISE	WISE	·	2.5 km	MPC · JPL
739112	2017 FO_{77}	—	September 19, 2003	Kitt Peak	Spacewatch	·	2.0 km	MPC · JPL
739113	2017 FF_{80}	—	September 26, 2003	Apache Point	SDSS Collaboration	·	2.8 km	MPC · JPL
739114	2017 FJ_{81}	—	November 7, 2007	Kitt Peak	Spacewatch	PHO	2.1 km	MPC · JPL
739115	2017 FX_{81}	—	June 7, 2013	Haleakala	Pan-STARRS 1	·	1.4 km	MPC · JPL
739116	2017 FT_{82}	—	April 20, 2010	Kitt Peak	Spacewatch	·	1.7 km	MPC · JPL
739117	2017 FY_{82}	—	November 10, 2015	Mount Lemmon	Mount Lemmon Survey	·	2.0 km	MPC · JPL
739118	2017 FK_{84}	—	February 4, 2017	Mount Lemmon	Mount Lemmon Survey	DOR	1.8 km	MPC · JPL
739119	2017 FB_{85}	—	April 27, 2012	Mount Lemmon	Mount Lemmon Survey	·	2.2 km	MPC · JPL
739120	2017 FA_{87}	—	August 23, 2014	Haleakala	Pan-STARRS 1	615	1.1 km	MPC · JPL
739121	2017 FW_{87}	—	February 2, 2006	Kitt Peak	Spacewatch	EOS	2.0 km	MPC · JPL
739122	2017 FQ_{88}	—	October 28, 2014	Haleakala	Pan-STARRS 1	·	2.3 km	MPC · JPL
739123	2017 FB_{89}	—	November 17, 2014	Mount Lemmon	Mount Lemmon Survey	·	2.5 km	MPC · JPL
739124	2017 FK_{92}	—	May 4, 2000	Apache Point	SDSS Collaboration	·	2.7 km	MPC · JPL
739125	2017 FS_{92}	—	November 10, 2010	Mount Lemmon	Mount Lemmon Survey	·	4.6 km	MPC · JPL
739126	2017 FF_{93}	—	November 21, 2006	Mount Lemmon	Mount Lemmon Survey	·	2.0 km	MPC · JPL
739127	2017 FJ_{93}	—	March 30, 2012	Siding Spring	SSS	·	1.6 km	MPC · JPL
739128	2017 FE_{94}	—	October 27, 2009	Mount Lemmon	Mount Lemmon Survey	·	2.6 km	MPC · JPL
739129	2017 FP_{94}	—	April 16, 2007	Siding Spring	SSS	·	1.6 km	MPC · JPL
739130	2017 FQ_{95}	—	January 2, 2016	Mount Lemmon	Mount Lemmon Survey	·	2.3 km	MPC · JPL
739131	2017 FY_{95}	—	April 20, 2012	Mount Lemmon	Mount Lemmon Survey	·	2.1 km	MPC · JPL
739132	2017 FF_{97}	—	January 15, 2011	Mount Lemmon	Mount Lemmon Survey	THM	2.3 km	MPC · JPL
739133	2017 FR_{97}	—	January 12, 2010	WISE	WISE	NAE	4.7 km	MPC · JPL
739134	2017 FS_{99}	—	August 31, 2000	Kitt Peak	Spacewatch	·	1.7 km	MPC · JPL
739135	2017 FX_{99}	—	September 24, 2008	Mount Lemmon	Mount Lemmon Survey	·	2.5 km	MPC · JPL
739136	2017 FO_{100}	—	March 25, 2017	Mount Lemmon	Mount Lemmon Survey	·	2.4 km	MPC · JPL
739137	2017 FV_{100}	—	April 14, 2008	Kitt Peak	Spacewatch	·	1.8 km	MPC · JPL
739138	2017 FK_{103}	—	March 2, 2010	WISE	WISE	·	2.7 km	MPC · JPL
739139	2017 FN_{103}	—	September 16, 2009	Mount Lemmon	Mount Lemmon Survey	·	2.5 km	MPC · JPL
739140	2017 FF_{104}	—	February 25, 2011	Mount Lemmon	Mount Lemmon Survey	·	2.2 km	MPC · JPL
739141	2017 FL_{104}	—	December 5, 2015	Haleakala	Pan-STARRS 1	·	2.0 km	MPC · JPL
739142	2017 FG_{105}	—	September 28, 2008	Mount Lemmon	Mount Lemmon Survey	·	3.5 km	MPC · JPL
739143	2017 FV_{105}	—	February 2, 2017	Haleakala	Pan-STARRS 1	·	930 m	MPC · JPL
739144	2017 FU_{107}	—	February 6, 2010	WISE	WISE	EOS	3.3 km	MPC · JPL
739145	2017 FG_{108}	—	February 8, 2011	Mount Lemmon	Mount Lemmon Survey	·	2.6 km	MPC · JPL
739146	2017 FW_{108}	—	February 17, 2010	Mount Lemmon	Mount Lemmon Survey	·	720 m	MPC · JPL
739147	2017 FV_{110}	—	July 28, 2010	WISE	WISE	·	2.2 km	MPC · JPL
739148	2017 FS_{112}	—	January 30, 2006	Kitt Peak	Spacewatch	·	1.8 km	MPC · JPL
739149	2017 FG_{113}	—	February 25, 2007	Kitt Peak	Spacewatch	·	450 m	MPC · JPL
739150	2017 FQ_{113}	—	August 31, 2014	Mount Lemmon	Mount Lemmon Survey	KOR	1.0 km	MPC · JPL
739151	2017 FY_{114}	—	December 24, 2005	Kitt Peak	Spacewatch	·	1.3 km	MPC · JPL
739152	2017 FB_{115}	—	January 31, 2006	Kitt Peak	Spacewatch	EOS	1.5 km	MPC · JPL
739153	2017 FW_{116}	—	August 27, 2014	Haleakala	Pan-STARRS 1	KOR	1.1 km	MPC · JPL
739154	2017 FA_{118}	—	February 1, 2006	Kitt Peak	Spacewatch	·	2.6 km	MPC · JPL
739155	2017 FP_{118}	—	January 30, 2017	Haleakala	Pan-STARRS 1	·	2.8 km	MPC · JPL
739156	2017 FN_{119}	—	January 29, 2010	WISE	WISE	·	2.1 km	MPC · JPL
739157	2017 FZ_{119}	—	March 29, 2012	Haleakala	Pan-STARRS 1	·	1.9 km	MPC · JPL
739158	2017 FS_{120}	—	December 14, 2015	Mount Lemmon	Mount Lemmon Survey	·	2.4 km	MPC · JPL
739159	2017 FT_{120}	—	September 27, 2009	Mount Lemmon	Mount Lemmon Survey	·	2.4 km	MPC · JPL
739160	2017 FY_{120}	—	November 22, 2009	Catalina	CSS	·	4.4 km	MPC · JPL
739161	2017 FD_{122}	—	March 18, 2017	Haleakala	Pan-STARRS 1	·	1.5 km	MPC · JPL
739162	2017 FR_{122}	—	March 29, 2012	Mount Lemmon	Mount Lemmon Survey	·	1.4 km	MPC · JPL
739163	2017 FN_{123}	—	March 9, 2011	Mount Lemmon	Mount Lemmon Survey	·	2.4 km	MPC · JPL
739164	2017 FU_{123}	—	March 11, 2003	Palomar	NEAT	·	1.8 km	MPC · JPL
739165	2017 FZ_{126}	—	October 23, 2006	Mount Lemmon	Mount Lemmon Survey	·	2.1 km	MPC · JPL
739166	2017 FH_{129}	—	September 21, 2003	Kitt Peak	Spacewatch	·	1.4 km	MPC · JPL
739167	2017 FQ_{129}	—	January 16, 2010	WISE	WISE	·	2.2 km	MPC · JPL
739168	2017 FL_{130}	—	September 19, 2014	Haleakala	Pan-STARRS 1	·	1.7 km	MPC · JPL
739169	2017 FV_{131}	—	November 5, 2005	Mount Lemmon	Mount Lemmon Survey	KOR	1.1 km	MPC · JPL
739170	2017 FH_{132}	—	September 30, 2009	Mount Lemmon	Mount Lemmon Survey	·	2.5 km	MPC · JPL
739171	2017 FD_{134}	—	February 25, 2006	Kitt Peak	Spacewatch	THM	1.7 km	MPC · JPL
739172	2017 FH_{138}	—	August 27, 2014	Haleakala	Pan-STARRS 1	·	1.5 km	MPC · JPL
739173	2017 FV_{140}	—	March 17, 2012	Mount Lemmon	Mount Lemmon Survey	KOR	1.0 km	MPC · JPL
739174	2017 FL_{141}	—	November 5, 2005	Kitt Peak	Spacewatch	·	1.5 km	MPC · JPL
739175	2017 FS_{141}	—	January 8, 2011	Mount Lemmon	Mount Lemmon Survey	·	1.8 km	MPC · JPL
739176	2017 FQ_{142}	—	November 23, 2009	Mount Lemmon	Mount Lemmon Survey	·	2.3 km	MPC · JPL
739177	2017 FV_{142}	—	December 1, 2005	Kitt Peak	Wasserman, L. H., Millis, R. L.	·	1.7 km	MPC · JPL
739178	2017 FG_{143}	—	February 2, 2010	WISE	WISE	EOS	1.6 km	MPC · JPL
739179	2017 FJ_{143}	—	February 2, 2001	Kitt Peak	Spacewatch	·	2.7 km	MPC · JPL
739180	2017 FM_{143}	—	March 3, 2009	Kitt Peak	Spacewatch	3:2	5.6 km	MPC · JPL
739181	2017 FY_{143}	—	October 1, 2005	Mount Lemmon	Mount Lemmon Survey	AST	1.4 km	MPC · JPL
739182	2017 FZ_{143}	—	October 15, 2009	Mount Lemmon	Mount Lemmon Survey	·	1.5 km	MPC · JPL
739183	2017 FG_{146}	—	April 17, 2012	Kitt Peak	Spacewatch	·	1.6 km	MPC · JPL
739184	2017 FW_{146}	—	October 13, 2006	Kitt Peak	Spacewatch	·	1.6 km	MPC · JPL
739185	2017 FX_{146}	—	February 21, 2012	Kitt Peak	Spacewatch	EOS	1.6 km	MPC · JPL
739186	2017 FQ_{149}	—	March 28, 2017	Haleakala	Pan-STARRS 1	·	1.8 km	MPC · JPL
739187	2017 FJ_{150}	—	December 6, 2005	Kitt Peak	Spacewatch	·	1.7 km	MPC · JPL
739188	2017 FJ_{151}	—	October 21, 2009	Mount Lemmon	Mount Lemmon Survey	LIX	3.2 km	MPC · JPL
739189	2017 FX_{151}	—	February 10, 2010	WISE	WISE	·	2.8 km	MPC · JPL
739190	2017 FS_{157}	—	November 19, 2003	Kitt Peak	Spacewatch	·	2.9 km	MPC · JPL
739191	2017 FD_{158}	—	January 30, 2017	Haleakala	Pan-STARRS 1	·	2.5 km	MPC · JPL
739192	2017 FH_{158}	—	September 26, 2003	Apache Point	SDSS Collaboration	·	2.2 km	MPC · JPL
739193	2017 FM_{159}	—	April 24, 2007	Kitt Peak	Spacewatch	·	1.9 km	MPC · JPL
739194	2017 FN_{159}	—	July 27, 2014	Haleakala	Pan-STARRS 1	·	1.2 km	MPC · JPL
739195	2017 FU_{159}	—	September 12, 2010	Mount Lemmon	Mount Lemmon Survey	·	1.5 km	MPC · JPL
739196	2017 FX_{159}	—	October 2, 2014	Haleakala	Pan-STARRS 1	·	1.7 km	MPC · JPL
739197	2017 FK_{173}	—	November 17, 2014	Haleakala	Pan-STARRS 1	·	2.3 km	MPC · JPL
739198	2017 FJ_{174}	—	March 25, 2017	Mount Lemmon	Mount Lemmon Survey	·	1.6 km	MPC · JPL
739199	2017 FL_{174}	—	March 19, 2017	Mount Lemmon	Mount Lemmon Survey	·	1.1 km	MPC · JPL
739200	2017 FF_{178}	—	March 21, 2017	Haleakala	Pan-STARRS 1	·	2.3 km	MPC · JPL

== 739201–739300 ==
back to top

Designation			Discovery			Properties		Ref
Permanent	Provisional	Named after	Date	Site	Discoverer(s)	Category	Diam.	Ref
739201	2017 FJ_{180}	—	March 21, 2017	Haleakala	Pan-STARRS 1	EOS	1.4 km	MPC · JPL
739202	2017 FX_{181}	—	March 21, 2017	Haleakala	Pan-STARRS 1	·	2.0 km	MPC · JPL
739203	2017 FY_{181}	—	March 19, 2017	Mount Lemmon	Mount Lemmon Survey	EOS	1.5 km	MPC · JPL
739204	2017 GN_{1}	—	January 3, 2012	Kitt Peak	Spacewatch	·	1.4 km	MPC · JPL
739205	2017 GD_{2}	—	October 21, 2003	Kitt Peak	Spacewatch	·	4.6 km	MPC · JPL
739206	2017 GK_{2}	—	December 7, 2005	Kitt Peak	Spacewatch	·	2.1 km	MPC · JPL
739207	2017 GL_{2}	—	March 11, 2007	Kitt Peak	Spacewatch	·	2.3 km	MPC · JPL
739208	2017 GX_{3}	—	February 13, 2011	Mount Lemmon	Mount Lemmon Survey	·	2.1 km	MPC · JPL
739209	2017 GR_{7}	—	April 28, 2010	WISE	WISE	PHO	800 m	MPC · JPL
739210	2017 GQ_{10}	—	November 17, 2014	Haleakala	Pan-STARRS 1	·	3.1 km	MPC · JPL
739211	2017 GF_{14}	—	April 6, 2017	Mount Lemmon	Mount Lemmon Survey	·	2.7 km	MPC · JPL
739212	2017 GK_{17}	—	April 6, 2017	Haleakala	Pan-STARRS 1	·	1.6 km	MPC · JPL
739213	2017 GK_{19}	—	March 16, 2012	Kitt Peak	Spacewatch	EOS	1.4 km	MPC · JPL
739214	2017 GJ_{26}	—	April 6, 2017	Haleakala	Pan-STARRS 1	·	1.6 km	MPC · JPL
739215	2017 GE_{32}	—	April 6, 2017	Haleakala	Pan-STARRS 1	EUP	3.0 km	MPC · JPL
739216	2017 HO_{5}	—	March 2, 2011	Mount Lemmon	Mount Lemmon Survey	EOS	1.4 km	MPC · JPL
739217	2017 HQ_{6}	—	January 4, 2016	Haleakala	Pan-STARRS 1	·	2.1 km	MPC · JPL
739218	2017 HX_{6}	—	November 11, 2009	Kitt Peak	Spacewatch	·	1.8 km	MPC · JPL
739219	2017 HS_{7}	—	October 25, 2005	Kitt Peak	Spacewatch	·	1.8 km	MPC · JPL
739220	2017 HT_{7}	—	April 7, 2008	Kitt Peak	Spacewatch	HOF	2.3 km	MPC · JPL
739221	2017 HK_{8}	—	May 17, 2012	Mount Lemmon	Mount Lemmon Survey	·	1.9 km	MPC · JPL
739222	2017 HY_{9}	—	November 8, 2009	Kitt Peak	Spacewatch	·	2.7 km	MPC · JPL
739223	2017 HW_{10}	—	August 27, 2009	Kitt Peak	Spacewatch	·	2.9 km	MPC · JPL
739224	2017 HL_{12}	—	October 2, 2006	Mount Lemmon	Mount Lemmon Survey	·	4.5 km	MPC · JPL
739225	2017 HM_{13}	—	September 23, 2008	Mount Lemmon	Mount Lemmon Survey	·	2.7 km	MPC · JPL
739226	2017 HZ_{13}	—	February 12, 2010	WISE	WISE	EOS	2.8 km	MPC · JPL
739227	2017 HJ_{14}	—	September 27, 2006	Mount Lemmon	Mount Lemmon Survey	·	1.2 km	MPC · JPL
739228	2017 HO_{14}	—	April 1, 2012	Mount Lemmon	Mount Lemmon Survey	·	2.1 km	MPC · JPL
739229	2017 HF_{16}	—	April 19, 2017	Mount Lemmon	Mount Lemmon Survey	·	1.2 km	MPC · JPL
739230	2017 HZ_{16}	—	April 24, 2003	Kitt Peak	Spacewatch	·	1.7 km	MPC · JPL
739231	2017 HE_{19}	—	November 11, 2009	Mount Lemmon	Mount Lemmon Survey	HYG	3.3 km	MPC · JPL
739232	2017 HH_{19}	—	November 17, 2001	Kitt Peak	Deep Lens Survey	·	600 m	MPC · JPL
739233	2017 HT_{19}	—	April 1, 2017	Haleakala	Pan-STARRS 1	·	2.4 km	MPC · JPL
739234	2017 HJ_{30}	—	May 10, 2003	Kitt Peak	Spacewatch	·	810 m	MPC · JPL
739235	2017 HK_{31}	—	September 4, 2000	Kitt Peak	Spacewatch	·	570 m	MPC · JPL
739236	2017 HR_{33}	—	October 25, 2014	Mount Lemmon	Mount Lemmon Survey	·	1.4 km	MPC · JPL
739237	2017 HD_{34}	—	September 28, 2013	Mount Lemmon	Mount Lemmon Survey	VER	2.1 km	MPC · JPL
739238	2017 HS_{34}	—	August 23, 2007	Kitt Peak	Spacewatch	·	2.4 km	MPC · JPL
739239	2017 HT_{36}	—	October 2, 2013	Mount Lemmon	Mount Lemmon Survey	VER	2.0 km	MPC · JPL
739240	2017 HH_{41}	—	December 10, 2009	Mount Lemmon	Mount Lemmon Survey	·	2.3 km	MPC · JPL
739241	2017 HM_{41}	—	October 8, 2008	Kitt Peak	Spacewatch	·	1.6 km	MPC · JPL
739242	2017 HM_{42}	—	November 26, 2014	Haleakala	Pan-STARRS 1	·	2.7 km	MPC · JPL
739243	2017 HZ_{42}	—	September 19, 2007	Kitt Peak	Spacewatch	·	3.3 km	MPC · JPL
739244	2017 HZ_{43}	—	November 24, 2011	Haleakala	Pan-STARRS 1	ADE	1.4 km	MPC · JPL
739245	2017 HB_{44}	—	December 17, 2012	ASC-Kislovodsk	Nevski, V., Romas, E.	·	1.6 km	MPC · JPL
739246	2017 HT_{44}	—	April 29, 2000	Socorro	LINEAR	EUP	5.0 km	MPC · JPL
739247	2017 HV_{44}	—	October 26, 2008	Kitt Peak	Spacewatch	·	2.6 km	MPC · JPL
739248	2017 HO_{45}	—	March 12, 2011	Mount Lemmon	Mount Lemmon Survey	·	2.5 km	MPC · JPL
739249	2017 HW_{45}	—	December 3, 2015	Haleakala	Pan-STARRS 1	·	2.1 km	MPC · JPL
739250	2017 HD_{48}	—	April 2, 2010	WISE	WISE	EUP	3.0 km	MPC · JPL
739251	2017 HE_{48}	—	July 21, 2006	Mount Lemmon	Mount Lemmon Survey	·	5.0 km	MPC · JPL
739252	2017 HH_{51}	—	October 16, 2009	Mount Lemmon	Mount Lemmon Survey	KOR	1.0 km	MPC · JPL
739253	2017 HU_{61}	—	March 17, 2012	Mount Lemmon	Mount Lemmon Survey	·	1.4 km	MPC · JPL
739254	2017 HR_{70}	—	April 28, 2017	Haleakala	Pan-STARRS 1	·	2.3 km	MPC · JPL
739255	2017 HD_{73}	—	April 23, 2017	Mount Lemmon	Mount Lemmon Survey	·	2.7 km	MPC · JPL
739256	2017 HJ_{74}	—	April 26, 2017	Haleakala	Pan-STARRS 1	·	1.2 km	MPC · JPL
739257	2017 HS_{76}	—	October 22, 2014	Mount Lemmon	Mount Lemmon Survey	VER	2.0 km	MPC · JPL
739258	2017 HP_{79}	—	April 20, 2017	Haleakala	Pan-STARRS 1	·	730 m	MPC · JPL
739259	2017 JA_{1}	—	January 14, 2016	Haleakala	Pan-STARRS 1	·	2.3 km	MPC · JPL
739260	2017 JM_{1}	—	June 29, 1998	Kitt Peak	Spacewatch	·	570 m	MPC · JPL
739261	2017 JW_{3}	—	February 27, 2007	Kitt Peak	Spacewatch	·	1.7 km	MPC · JPL
739262	2017 JF_{4}	—	January 31, 2003	Kitt Peak	Spacewatch	ADE	2.4 km	MPC · JPL
739263	2017 JW_{4}	—	April 18, 2010	WISE	WISE	·	3.3 km	MPC · JPL
739264	2017 JF_{5}	—	August 14, 2007	Siding Spring	SSS	·	5.4 km	MPC · JPL
739265	2017 JX_{7}	—	May 1, 2017	Mount Lemmon	Mount Lemmon Survey	·	510 m	MPC · JPL
739266	2017 JK_{10}	—	May 6, 2017	Haleakala	Pan-STARRS 1	·	1.5 km	MPC · JPL
739267	2017 KZ	—	November 7, 2015	Mount Lemmon	Mount Lemmon Survey	·	560 m	MPC · JPL
739268	2017 KF_{1}	—	August 20, 2001	Cerro Tololo	Deep Ecliptic Survey	·	460 m	MPC · JPL
739269	2017 KA_{2}	—	January 7, 2016	Haleakala	Pan-STARRS 1	EOS	1.3 km	MPC · JPL
739270	2017 KQ_{5}	—	January 2, 2016	Mount Lemmon	Mount Lemmon Survey	·	3.3 km	MPC · JPL
739271	2017 KG_{6}	—	November 7, 2008	Mount Lemmon	Mount Lemmon Survey	·	600 m	MPC · JPL
739272	2017 KK_{6}	—	February 20, 2001	Apache Point	SDSS Collaboration	·	2.2 km	MPC · JPL
739273	2017 KJ_{7}	—	April 27, 2017	Haleakala	Pan-STARRS 1	·	1.4 km	MPC · JPL
739274	2017 KL_{7}	—	February 5, 2016	Haleakala	Pan-STARRS 1	·	2.1 km	MPC · JPL
739275	2017 KY_{9}	—	November 22, 2009	Kitt Peak	Spacewatch	·	2.8 km	MPC · JPL
739276	2017 KF_{10}	—	November 26, 2014	Haleakala	Pan-STARRS 1	·	2.5 km	MPC · JPL
739277	2017 KM_{14}	—	April 15, 2012	Haleakala	Pan-STARRS 1	·	2.3 km	MPC · JPL
739278	2017 KZ_{14}	—	October 13, 2010	Mount Lemmon	Mount Lemmon Survey	·	1.4 km	MPC · JPL
739279	2017 KL_{15}	—	September 6, 2008	Mount Lemmon	Mount Lemmon Survey	·	2.2 km	MPC · JPL
739280	2017 KD_{16}	—	October 29, 2002	Apache Point	SDSS Collaboration	·	2.5 km	MPC · JPL
739281	2017 KX_{16}	—	October 11, 2007	Kitt Peak	Spacewatch	(260)	3.8 km	MPC · JPL
739282	2017 KZ_{16}	—	October 14, 2014	Mount Lemmon	Mount Lemmon Survey	WIT	860 m	MPC · JPL
739283	2017 KL_{17}	—	November 18, 2003	Kitt Peak	Spacewatch	·	2.8 km	MPC · JPL
739284	2017 KU_{18}	—	November 25, 2009	Mount Lemmon	Mount Lemmon Survey	NAE	2.7 km	MPC · JPL
739285	2017 KA_{20}	—	October 10, 2008	Mount Lemmon	Mount Lemmon Survey	·	4.4 km	MPC · JPL
739286	2017 KC_{20}	—	August 28, 2014	Haleakala	Pan-STARRS 1	·	860 m	MPC · JPL
739287	2017 KS_{20}	—	October 5, 2013	Mount Lemmon	Mount Lemmon Survey	·	2.1 km	MPC · JPL
739288	2017 KU_{20}	—	January 18, 2004	Palomar	NEAT	·	3.3 km	MPC · JPL
739289	2017 KB_{21}	—	October 25, 2008	Kitt Peak	Spacewatch	·	4.4 km	MPC · JPL
739290	2017 KF_{21}	—	May 14, 2010	WISE	WISE	·	4.0 km	MPC · JPL
739291	2017 KQ_{21}	—	December 16, 2004	Kitt Peak	Spacewatch	EOS	4.4 km	MPC · JPL
739292	2017 KZ_{23}	—	December 13, 2015	Haleakala	Pan-STARRS 1	·	1.5 km	MPC · JPL
739293	2017 KH_{24}	—	October 23, 2008	Kitt Peak	Spacewatch	·	4.3 km	MPC · JPL
739294	2017 KC_{26}	—	December 18, 2012	Oukaïmeden	M. Ory	·	610 m	MPC · JPL
739295	2017 KG_{26}	—	July 18, 2010	WISE	WISE	·	1.1 km	MPC · JPL
739296	2017 KP_{28}	—	March 16, 2004	Siding Spring	SSS	·	1.9 km	MPC · JPL
739297	2017 KF_{33}	—	April 10, 2010	WISE	WISE	·	3.1 km	MPC · JPL
739298	2017 KL_{36}	—	May 2, 2006	Mount Lemmon	Mount Lemmon Survey	·	2.2 km	MPC · JPL
739299	2017 KG_{37}	—	January 6, 2010	Mount Lemmon	Mount Lemmon Survey	·	4.7 km	MPC · JPL
739300	2017 LR	—	November 8, 2007	Catalina	CSS	·	4.4 km	MPC · JPL

== 739301–739400 ==
back to top

Designation			Discovery			Properties		Ref
Permanent	Provisional	Named after	Date	Site	Discoverer(s)	Category	Diam.	Ref
739301	2017 MZ_{14}	—	June 25, 2017	Haleakala	Pan-STARRS 1	·	2.5 km	MPC · JPL
739302	2017 MZ_{22}	—	May 8, 2016	Mount Lemmon	Mount Lemmon Survey	·	2.4 km	MPC · JPL
739303	2017 NT	—	September 21, 2009	Kitt Peak	Spacewatch	·	1.4 km	MPC · JPL
739304	2017 NH_{5}	—	February 13, 2002	Apache Point	SDSS Collaboration	·	790 m	MPC · JPL
739305	2017 NU_{12}	—	July 1, 2017	Haleakala	Pan-STARRS 1	·	1.5 km	MPC · JPL
739306	2017 NW_{27}	—	January 18, 2015	Mount Lemmon	Mount Lemmon Survey	·	1.4 km	MPC · JPL
739307	2017 OU_{1}	—	November 11, 2004	Kitt Peak	Spacewatch	·	670 m	MPC · JPL
739308	2017 OB_{2}	—	August 1, 2000	Socorro	LINEAR	·	3.3 km	MPC · JPL
739309	2017 OZ_{5}	—	March 19, 2009	Mount Lemmon	Mount Lemmon Survey	CLA	2.0 km	MPC · JPL
739310	2017 OB_{7}	—	February 12, 2004	Kitt Peak	Spacewatch	THB	3.1 km	MPC · JPL
739311	2017 OM_{9}	—	July 15, 2017	Haleakala	Pan-STARRS 1	·	620 m	MPC · JPL
739312	2017 OP_{9}	—	March 21, 2010	Mount Lemmon	Mount Lemmon Survey	·	3.1 km	MPC · JPL
739313	2017 OV_{11}	—	November 7, 2007	Kitt Peak	Spacewatch	THM	3.7 km	MPC · JPL
739314	2017 OR_{13}	—	February 5, 2011	Haleakala	Pan-STARRS 1	·	1.4 km	MPC · JPL
739315	2017 OE_{17}	—	July 25, 2017	Haleakala	Pan-STARRS 1	·	1.6 km	MPC · JPL
739316	2017 OB_{18}	—	November 3, 2010	Kitt Peak	Spacewatch	V	480 m	MPC · JPL
739317	2017 OV_{20}	—	August 31, 2014	Haleakala	Pan-STARRS 1	·	590 m	MPC · JPL
739318	2017 OV_{22}	—	December 30, 2008	Kitt Peak	Spacewatch	·	540 m	MPC · JPL
739319	2017 OD_{26}	—	January 21, 2010	WISE	WISE	·	3.2 km	MPC · JPL
739320	2017 OC_{30}	—	August 13, 2012	Kitt Peak	Spacewatch	·	1.5 km	MPC · JPL
739321	2017 OV_{32}	—	January 27, 2010	WISE	WISE	·	4.7 km	MPC · JPL
739322	2017 OZ_{32}	—	July 26, 2010	WISE	WISE	·	3.2 km	MPC · JPL
739323	2017 OE_{34}	—	February 13, 2012	Haleakala	Pan-STARRS 1	V	430 m	MPC · JPL
739324	2017 OS_{35}	—	May 30, 2006	Mount Lemmon	Mount Lemmon Survey	·	2.8 km	MPC · JPL
739325	2017 OU_{35}	—	June 3, 2010	WISE	WISE	·	3.7 km	MPC · JPL
739326	2017 OL_{38}	—	June 1, 1997	Kitt Peak	Spacewatch	·	520 m	MPC · JPL
739327	2017 OH_{41}	—	March 20, 1999	Apache Point	SDSS Collaboration	TIR	2.2 km	MPC · JPL
739328	2017 OA_{42}	—	July 14, 2010	WISE	WISE	·	850 m	MPC · JPL
739329	2017 OH_{43}	—	October 11, 2012	Kitt Peak	Spacewatch	VER	2.3 km	MPC · JPL
739330	2017 OP_{45}	—	April 15, 2010	WISE	WISE	·	3.8 km	MPC · JPL
739331	2017 OZ_{52}	—	January 6, 2010	Kitt Peak	Spacewatch	·	2.3 km	MPC · JPL
739332	2017 OB_{57}	—	August 23, 2007	Kitt Peak	Spacewatch	·	1.8 km	MPC · JPL
739333	2017 OL_{58}	—	January 17, 2015	Haleakala	Pan-STARRS 1	·	1.3 km	MPC · JPL
739334	2017 OH_{59}	—	June 4, 2016	Mount Lemmon	Mount Lemmon Survey	EOS	1.5 km	MPC · JPL
739335	2017 OB_{61}	—	August 19, 2010	Kitt Peak	Spacewatch	·	620 m	MPC · JPL
739336	2017 OJ_{66}	—	July 30, 2017	Haleakala	Pan-STARRS 1	EOS	1.3 km	MPC · JPL
739337	2017 OT_{66}	—	May 12, 2010	Mount Lemmon	Mount Lemmon Survey	LIX	3.3 km	MPC · JPL
739338	2017 OW_{66}	—	September 19, 2010	Kitt Peak	Spacewatch	·	740 m	MPC · JPL
739339	2017 OZ_{88}	—	July 24, 2017	Haleakala	Pan-STARRS 1	·	1.5 km	MPC · JPL
739340	2017 OF_{89}	—	July 25, 2017	Haleakala	Pan-STARRS 1	EOS	1.5 km	MPC · JPL
739341	2017 OK_{89}	—	July 26, 2017	Haleakala	Pan-STARRS 1	·	540 m	MPC · JPL
739342	2017 OX_{104}	—	May 1, 2016	Cerro Tololo-DECam	DECam	·	750 m	MPC · JPL
739343	2017 OF_{134}	—	April 18, 2015	Cerro Tololo-DECam	DECam	·	2.4 km	MPC · JPL
739344	2017 PK_{16}	—	March 25, 1999	Kitt Peak	Spacewatch	·	1.2 km	MPC · JPL
739345	2017 PS_{21}	—	August 13, 2012	Haleakala	Pan-STARRS 1	KOR	1.1 km	MPC · JPL
739346	2017 PP_{22}	—	August 1, 2017	Haleakala	Pan-STARRS 1	·	2.1 km	MPC · JPL
739347	2017 PE_{25}	—	November 5, 2004	Palomar	NEAT	·	2.9 km	MPC · JPL
739348	2017 PP_{30}	—	January 16, 2010	WISE	WISE	·	3.3 km	MPC · JPL
739349	2017 PF_{31}	—	July 13, 2010	WISE	WISE	PHO	1.4 km	MPC · JPL
739350	2017 PT_{31}	—	September 28, 2006	Catalina	CSS	·	4.5 km	MPC · JPL
739351	2017 PD_{32}	—	September 3, 2008	Kitt Peak	Spacewatch	HOF	2.5 km	MPC · JPL
739352	2017 PF_{34}	—	May 23, 2001	Cerro Tololo	Deep Ecliptic Survey	·	5.1 km	MPC · JPL
739353	2017 PW_{34}	—	October 14, 2007	Mount Lemmon	Mount Lemmon Survey	·	600 m	MPC · JPL
739354	2017 PS_{37}	—	March 28, 2016	Cerro Tololo-DECam	DECam	·	880 m	MPC · JPL
739355	2017 PK_{41}	—	July 8, 2017	Haleakala	Pan-STARRS 1	·	1.7 km	MPC · JPL
739356	2017 PP_{41}	—	August 1, 2008	Dauban	F. Kugel, C. Rinner	·	1.9 km	MPC · JPL
739357	2017 QU	—	January 16, 2004	Kitt Peak	Spacewatch	·	3.4 km	MPC · JPL
739358	2017 QW	—	July 26, 2010	WISE	WISE	·	3.2 km	MPC · JPL
739359	2017 QL_{4}	—	June 21, 2010	WISE	WISE	ERI	2.0 km	MPC · JPL
739360	2017 QB_{5}	—	October 8, 2007	Anderson Mesa	LONEOS	·	630 m	MPC · JPL
739361	2017 QT_{5}	—	January 8, 2016	Haleakala	Pan-STARRS 1	·	560 m	MPC · JPL
739362	2017 QK_{14}	—	January 20, 2015	Haleakala	Pan-STARRS 1	AGN	890 m	MPC · JPL
739363	2017 QM_{15}	—	September 15, 2006	Kitt Peak	Spacewatch	THM	2.4 km	MPC · JPL
739364	2017 QS_{18}	—	November 26, 2014	Haleakala	Pan-STARRS 1	·	780 m	MPC · JPL
739365	2017 QA_{30}	—	February 20, 2015	Haleakala	Pan-STARRS 1	·	2.0 km	MPC · JPL
739366	2017 QL_{34}	—	March 13, 2012	Kitt Peak	Spacewatch	·	1.5 km	MPC · JPL
739367	2017 QA_{38}	—	July 30, 2017	Haleakala	Pan-STARRS 1	AEO	820 m	MPC · JPL
739368	2017 QU_{44}	—	November 17, 2014	Mount Lemmon	Mount Lemmon Survey	·	740 m	MPC · JPL
739369	2017 QE_{50}	—	February 10, 2016	Haleakala	Pan-STARRS 1	·	500 m	MPC · JPL
739370	2017 QC_{51}	—	August 14, 2006	Palomar	NEAT	·	1.3 km	MPC · JPL
739371	2017 QW_{55}	—	March 21, 2010	WISE	WISE	·	2.1 km	MPC · JPL
739372	2017 QR_{56}	—	November 28, 1994	Kitt Peak	Spacewatch	3:2 · SHU	4.9 km	MPC · JPL
739373	2017 QV_{56}	—	March 18, 2010	Mount Lemmon	Mount Lemmon Survey	·	3.1 km	MPC · JPL
739374	2017 QW_{56}	—	March 19, 2010	Kitt Peak	Spacewatch	·	3.3 km	MPC · JPL
739375	2017 QA_{57}	—	August 21, 2006	Kitt Peak	Spacewatch	·	2.9 km	MPC · JPL
739376	2017 QD_{59}	—	January 23, 2015	Haleakala	Pan-STARRS 1	KOR	1.3 km	MPC · JPL
739377	2017 QR_{62}	—	June 21, 2007	Mount Lemmon	Mount Lemmon Survey	·	740 m	MPC · JPL
739378	2017 QQ_{65}	—	December 21, 2008	Mount Lemmon	Mount Lemmon Survey	·	4.3 km	MPC · JPL
739379	2017 QG_{92}	—	August 22, 2017	Haleakala	Pan-STARRS 1	V	570 m	MPC · JPL
739380	2017 QR_{97}	—	August 10, 2010	Kitt Peak	Spacewatch	·	650 m	MPC · JPL
739381	2017 QB_{98}	—	August 24, 2017	Haleakala	Pan-STARRS 1	·	1.3 km	MPC · JPL
739382	2017 QZ_{115}	—	January 13, 2008	Kitt Peak	Spacewatch	·	2.5 km	MPC · JPL
739383	2017 QT_{122}	—	September 28, 2013	Piszkéstető	K. Sárneczky	MAR	790 m	MPC · JPL
739384	2017 QU_{133}	—	August 16, 2017	Haleakala	Pan-STARRS 1	·	1.6 km	MPC · JPL
739385	2017 QM_{137}	—	March 5, 2016	Haleakala	Pan-STARRS 1	·	550 m	MPC · JPL
739386	2017 QO_{143}	—	August 23, 2017	Haleakala	Pan-STARRS 1	PHO	610 m	MPC · JPL
739387	2017 RZ_{19}	—	August 6, 2012	Haleakala	Pan-STARRS 1	·	1.9 km	MPC · JPL
739388	2017 RV_{23}	—	July 30, 2017	Haleakala	Pan-STARRS 1	·	1.5 km	MPC · JPL
739389	2017 RK_{24}	—	October 10, 2005	Catalina	CSS	·	1.7 km	MPC · JPL
739390	2017 RA_{25}	—	August 30, 2017	Mount Lemmon	Mount Lemmon Survey	·	1.8 km	MPC · JPL
739391	2017 RO_{28}	—	February 6, 2010	Mount Lemmon	Mount Lemmon Survey	·	2.8 km	MPC · JPL
739392	2017 RW_{28}	—	October 9, 2007	Kitt Peak	Spacewatch	·	560 m	MPC · JPL
739393	2017 RG_{29}	—	February 14, 2010	Kitt Peak	Spacewatch	·	4.5 km	MPC · JPL
739394	2017 RK_{29}	—	January 2, 2012	Kitt Peak	Spacewatch	·	520 m	MPC · JPL
739395	2017 RJ_{30}	—	January 21, 2014	Mount Lemmon	Mount Lemmon Survey	·	2.7 km	MPC · JPL
739396	2017 RT_{30}	—	September 16, 2012	Mount Lemmon	Mount Lemmon Survey	·	1.4 km	MPC · JPL
739397	2017 RC_{31}	—	April 10, 2013	Haleakala	Pan-STARRS 1	(1338) (FLO)	470 m	MPC · JPL
739398	2017 RN_{31}	—	March 2, 2006	Kitt Peak	Spacewatch	615	1.2 km	MPC · JPL
739399	2017 RY_{33}	—	July 26, 2010	WISE	WISE	·	960 m	MPC · JPL
739400	2017 RR_{39}	—	April 30, 2016	Haleakala	Pan-STARRS 1	·	620 m	MPC · JPL

== 739401–739500 ==
back to top

Designation			Discovery			Properties		Ref
Permanent	Provisional	Named after	Date	Site	Discoverer(s)	Category	Diam.	Ref
739401	2017 RR_{47}	—	September 14, 2007	Mount Lemmon	Mount Lemmon Survey	·	1.4 km	MPC · JPL
739402	2017 RV_{49}	—	August 19, 2001	Cerro Tololo	Deep Ecliptic Survey	MAS	820 m	MPC · JPL
739403	2017 RZ_{61}	—	March 21, 2009	Mount Lemmon	Mount Lemmon Survey	·	930 m	MPC · JPL
739404	2017 RV_{63}	—	January 19, 2012	Haleakala	Pan-STARRS 1	·	540 m	MPC · JPL
739405	2017 RD_{73}	—	February 1, 2012	Mount Lemmon	Mount Lemmon Survey	·	670 m	MPC · JPL
739406	2017 RM_{73}	—	March 5, 2002	Apache Point	SDSS	·	1.2 km	MPC · JPL
739407	2017 RO_{75}	—	August 28, 2017	Mount Lemmon	Mount Lemmon Survey	·	960 m	MPC · JPL
739408	2017 RU_{76}	—	October 29, 2003	Kitt Peak	Spacewatch	·	1.6 km	MPC · JPL
739409	2017 RW_{86}	—	September 18, 2010	Mount Lemmon	Mount Lemmon Survey	·	770 m	MPC · JPL
739410	2017 RP_{88}	—	August 13, 2010	Kitt Peak	Spacewatch	·	570 m	MPC · JPL
739411	2017 RJ_{90}	—	August 31, 2017	Haleakala	Pan-STARRS 1	·	2.7 km	MPC · JPL
739412	2017 RA_{92}	—	January 27, 2012	Mount Lemmon	Mount Lemmon Survey	·	560 m	MPC · JPL
739413	2017 RZ_{94}	—	January 16, 2005	Mauna Kea	Veillet, C.	·	520 m	MPC · JPL
739414	2017 RD_{103}	—	May 31, 2006	Mount Lemmon	Mount Lemmon Survey	·	630 m	MPC · JPL
739415	2017 RN_{104}	—	June 4, 2010	WISE	WISE	·	2.3 km	MPC · JPL
739416	2017 RU_{105}	—	October 11, 2012	Haleakala	Pan-STARRS 1	EOS	1.3 km	MPC · JPL
739417	2017 RM_{106}	—	November 6, 2012	Mount Lemmon	Mount Lemmon Survey	·	2.6 km	MPC · JPL
739418	2017 RQ_{107}	—	December 19, 2001	Palomar	NEAT	·	2.5 km	MPC · JPL
739419	2017 RD_{123}	—	April 19, 2015	Cerro Tololo-DECam	DECam	EOS	1.4 km	MPC · JPL
739420	2017 SZ_{7}	—	September 16, 2017	Haleakala	Pan-STARRS 1	·	810 m	MPC · JPL
739421	2017 SA_{8}	—	April 12, 2010	WISE	WISE	·	2.0 km	MPC · JPL
739422	2017 SZ_{16}	—	February 15, 2010	WISE	WISE	·	1.7 km	MPC · JPL
739423	2017 SF_{22}	—	October 9, 2007	Kitt Peak	Spacewatch	·	4.9 km	MPC · JPL
739424	2017 SM_{23}	—	April 1, 2009	Kitt Peak	Spacewatch	V	520 m	MPC · JPL
739425	2017 SL_{24}	—	September 14, 2017	Haleakala	Pan-STARRS 1	·	2.4 km	MPC · JPL
739426	2017 SH_{25}	—	June 1, 2009	Mount Lemmon	Mount Lemmon Survey	·	770 m	MPC · JPL
739427	2017 SC_{29}	—	October 4, 1999	Kitt Peak	Spacewatch	·	850 m	MPC · JPL
739428	2017 SO_{33}	—	September 11, 2005	Junk Bond	D. Healy	·	1.1 km	MPC · JPL
739429	2017 SJ_{37}	—	October 22, 2003	Apache Point	SDSS	·	3.3 km	MPC · JPL
739430	2017 SA_{38}	—	August 15, 2017	Haleakala	Pan-STARRS 1	·	640 m	MPC · JPL
739431	2017 SC_{38}	—	March 9, 2003	Palomar	NEAT	URS	3.8 km	MPC · JPL
739432	2017 ST_{40}	—	January 15, 2008	Mount Lemmon	Mount Lemmon Survey	·	2.7 km	MPC · JPL
739433	2017 SC_{41}	—	October 19, 2003	Apache Point	SDSS	·	760 m	MPC · JPL
739434	2017 ST_{46}	—	October 8, 2012	Haleakala	Pan-STARRS 1	·	1.7 km	MPC · JPL
739435	2017 SM_{49}	—	October 9, 2005	Kitt Peak	Spacewatch	·	770 m	MPC · JPL
739436	2017 SO_{50}	—	November 1, 2007	Kitt Peak	Spacewatch	·	630 m	MPC · JPL
739437	2017 SM_{51}	—	January 1, 2008	Kitt Peak	Spacewatch	V	470 m	MPC · JPL
739438	2017 ST_{52}	—	November 27, 2009	Mount Lemmon	Mount Lemmon Survey	·	2.7 km	MPC · JPL
739439	2017 SC_{54}	—	May 28, 2010	WISE	WISE	·	4.1 km	MPC · JPL
739440	2017 SW_{54}	—	November 14, 2010	Mount Lemmon	Mount Lemmon Survey	·	970 m	MPC · JPL
739441	2017 SS_{55}	—	September 16, 2017	Haleakala	Pan-STARRS 1	·	1.3 km	MPC · JPL
739442	2017 SK_{57}	—	July 12, 2010	WISE	WISE	·	770 m	MPC · JPL
739443	2017 SE_{62}	—	April 9, 2010	Kitt Peak	Spacewatch	·	2.8 km	MPC · JPL
739444	2017 SK_{62}	—	September 19, 2003	Haleakala	NEAT	·	2.5 km	MPC · JPL
739445	2017 SP_{62}	—	August 6, 2010	WISE	WISE	·	2.5 km	MPC · JPL
739446	2017 SO_{64}	—	March 12, 2007	Kitt Peak	Spacewatch	·	1.8 km	MPC · JPL
739447	2017 SE_{68}	—	October 3, 2010	Kitt Peak	Spacewatch	·	750 m	MPC · JPL
739448	2017 SQ_{72}	—	August 29, 2006	Kitt Peak	Spacewatch	·	2.7 km	MPC · JPL
739449	2017 SS_{72}	—	January 30, 2008	Mount Lemmon	Mount Lemmon Survey	·	680 m	MPC · JPL
739450	2017 SD_{75}	—	March 21, 2015	Haleakala	Pan-STARRS 1	·	2.1 km	MPC · JPL
739451	2017 SK_{77}	—	September 30, 2006	Mount Lemmon	Mount Lemmon Survey	·	860 m	MPC · JPL
739452	2017 SX_{77}	—	March 21, 2002	Kitt Peak	Spacewatch	NYS	730 m	MPC · JPL
739453	2017 SJ_{78}	—	August 26, 2003	Cerro Tololo	Deep Ecliptic Survey	·	630 m	MPC · JPL
739454	2017 SW_{82}	—	July 31, 2006	Siding Spring	SSS	·	1.1 km	MPC · JPL
739455	2017 SO_{87}	—	August 28, 2006	Kitt Peak	Spacewatch	·	860 m	MPC · JPL
739456	2017 SD_{90}	—	November 5, 2007	Kitt Peak	Spacewatch	·	540 m	MPC · JPL
739457	2017 SA_{91}	—	September 21, 2009	Mount Lemmon	Mount Lemmon Survey	·	870 m	MPC · JPL
739458	2017 SU_{96}	—	January 16, 2009	Kitt Peak	Spacewatch	·	790 m	MPC · JPL
739459	2017 SD_{98}	—	July 26, 2010	WISE	WISE	·	3.3 km	MPC · JPL
739460	2017 SF_{98}	—	October 25, 2001	Apache Point	SDSS Collaboration	·	2.4 km	MPC · JPL
739461	2017 SZ_{100}	—	March 19, 2009	Mount Lemmon	Mount Lemmon Survey	·	920 m	MPC · JPL
739462	2017 SR_{104}	—	September 24, 2000	Socorro	LINEAR	THB	3.0 km	MPC · JPL
739463	2017 SY_{104}	—	September 19, 2017	Haleakala	Pan-STARRS 1	EOS	1.5 km	MPC · JPL
739464	2017 SA_{107}	—	September 29, 2000	Kitt Peak	Spacewatch	·	1.2 km	MPC · JPL
739465	2017 SF_{107}	—	September 4, 2000	Anderson Mesa	LONEOS	·	1.6 km	MPC · JPL
739466	2017 SZ_{107}	—	May 28, 2010	WISE	WISE	·	3.0 km	MPC · JPL
739467	2017 SA_{113}	—	January 25, 2003	Apache Point	SDSS Collaboration	THM	1.8 km	MPC · JPL
739468	2017 SL_{116}	—	October 30, 2014	Kitt Peak	Spacewatch	·	520 m	MPC · JPL
739469	2017 SK_{117}	—	February 13, 2008	Kitt Peak	Spacewatch	·	2.8 km	MPC · JPL
739470	2017 SL_{118}	—	April 30, 2008	Mount Lemmon	Mount Lemmon Survey	·	2.6 km	MPC · JPL
739471	2017 SV_{122}	—	October 22, 2014	Mount Lemmon	Mount Lemmon Survey	·	610 m	MPC · JPL
739472	2017 SA_{125}	—	December 25, 2005	Kitt Peak	Spacewatch	·	1.0 km	MPC · JPL
739473	2017 SK_{128}	—	October 30, 2010	Catalina	CSS	·	1.0 km	MPC · JPL
739474	2017 SE_{130}	—	September 23, 2006	Kitt Peak	Spacewatch	MAS	510 m	MPC · JPL
739475	2017 SY_{197}	—	March 20, 2015	Haleakala	Pan-STARRS 1	EOS	1.6 km	MPC · JPL
739476	2017 SH_{198}	—	September 19, 2017	Haleakala	Pan-STARRS 1	·	850 m	MPC · JPL
739477	2017 SH_{199}	—	September 26, 2017	Haleakala	Pan-STARRS 1	EOS	1.5 km	MPC · JPL
739478	2017 SM_{199}	—	April 18, 2015	Cerro Tololo-DECam	DECam	·	1.7 km	MPC · JPL
739479	2017 SC_{201}	—	September 26, 2017	Mount Lemmon	Mount Lemmon Survey	·	600 m	MPC · JPL
739480	2017 SQ_{201}	—	September 16, 2017	Haleakala	Pan-STARRS 1	·	1.3 km	MPC · JPL
739481	2017 SW_{204}	—	April 21, 2015	Cerro Tololo-DECam	DECam	·	2.6 km	MPC · JPL
739482	2017 SG_{244}	—	September 2, 2011	Haleakala	Pan-STARRS 1	·	2.3 km	MPC · JPL
739483	2017 SJ_{247}	—	March 24, 2012	Mount Lemmon	Mount Lemmon Survey	·	970 m	MPC · JPL
739484	2017 SG_{262}	—	September 23, 2017	Haleakala	Pan-STARRS 1	KOR	860 m	MPC · JPL
739485	2017 SD_{288}	—	September 16, 2017	Haleakala	Pan-STARRS 1	T_{j} (2.93)	3.2 km	MPC · JPL
739486	2017 TK_{8}	—	August 8, 2010	WISE	WISE	·	5.1 km	MPC · JPL
739487	2017 TE_{10}	—	February 12, 2008	Mount Lemmon	Mount Lemmon Survey	·	3.6 km	MPC · JPL
739488	2017 TJ_{12}	—	August 1, 2010	WISE	WISE	·	3.0 km	MPC · JPL
739489	2017 TU_{12}	—	April 20, 2009	Mount Lemmon	Mount Lemmon Survey	·	660 m	MPC · JPL
739490	2017 TX_{12}	—	February 3, 2012	Haleakala	Pan-STARRS 1	·	580 m	MPC · JPL
739491	2017 TE_{26}	—	October 14, 2017	Mount Lemmon	Mount Lemmon Survey	·	1.5 km	MPC · JPL
739492	2017 TE_{36}	—	April 18, 2015	Cerro Tololo-DECam	DECam	·	1.4 km	MPC · JPL
739493	2017 TK_{37}	—	November 23, 2012	Kitt Peak	Spacewatch	EOS	1.3 km	MPC · JPL
739494	2017 UH_{9}	—	October 4, 2013	Catalina	CSS	·	1.6 km	MPC · JPL
739495	2017 UG_{12}	—	August 3, 2017	Haleakala	Pan-STARRS 1	·	510 m	MPC · JPL
739496	2017 UX_{18}	—	December 28, 2000	Kitt Peak	Spacewatch	·	440 m	MPC · JPL
739497	2017 UZ_{19}	—	October 2, 2006	Mount Lemmon	Mount Lemmon Survey	·	870 m	MPC · JPL
739498	2017 UN_{21}	—	November 1, 2007	Mount Lemmon	Mount Lemmon Survey	·	2.8 km	MPC · JPL
739499	2017 UP_{21}	—	August 31, 2017	Haleakala	Pan-STARRS 1	PAD	1.1 km	MPC · JPL
739500	2017 UM_{30}	—	September 25, 2006	Mount Lemmon	Mount Lemmon Survey	EOS	1.5 km	MPC · JPL

== 739501–739600 ==
back to top

Designation			Discovery			Properties		Ref
Permanent	Provisional	Named after	Date	Site	Discoverer(s)	Category	Diam.	Ref
739501	2017 UD_{38}	—	September 28, 2006	Kitt Peak	Spacewatch	·	760 m	MPC · JPL
739502	2017 UU_{39}	—	December 30, 2007	Kitt Peak	Spacewatch	·	3.4 km	MPC · JPL
739503	2017 UV_{41}	—	January 9, 2013	Mount Lemmon	Mount Lemmon Survey	·	2.4 km	MPC · JPL
739504	2017 UO_{45}	—	November 28, 2013	Mount Lemmon	Mount Lemmon Survey	·	1.4 km	MPC · JPL
739505	2017 UN_{93}	—	April 18, 2015	Cerro Tololo-DECam	DECam	·	830 m	MPC · JPL
739506	2017 UR_{94}	—	October 19, 2017	Haleakala	Pan-STARRS 1	·	940 m	MPC · JPL
739507	2017 UB_{100}	—	May 20, 2015	Cerro Tololo-DECam	DECam	·	2.0 km	MPC · JPL
739508	2017 UC_{136}	—	October 23, 2017	Mount Lemmon	Mount Lemmon Survey	3:2	4.4 km	MPC · JPL
739509	2017 VO_{3}	—	September 19, 2003	Palomar	NEAT	·	1.9 km	MPC · JPL
739510	2017 VU_{4}	—	October 7, 2004	Socorro	LINEAR	EUN	3.7 km	MPC · JPL
739511	2017 VP_{6}	—	October 12, 1996	Kitt Peak	Spacewatch	·	1.2 km	MPC · JPL
739512	2017 VX_{10}	—	March 31, 2003	Apache Point	SDSS Collaboration	(1118)	4.9 km	MPC · JPL
739513	2017 VA_{16}	—	July 7, 2010	Kitt Peak	Spacewatch	·	700 m	MPC · JPL
739514	2017 VB_{16}	—	April 21, 2015	Cerro Tololo	DECam	·	1.1 km	MPC · JPL
739515	2017 VA_{20}	—	October 11, 2010	Mount Lemmon	Mount Lemmon Survey	·	620 m	MPC · JPL
739516	2017 VF_{25}	—	November 21, 2003	Kitt Peak	Spacewatch	·	640 m	MPC · JPL
739517	2017 VL_{31}	—	April 2, 2006	Kitt Peak	Spacewatch	·	730 m	MPC · JPL
739518	2017 VO_{31}	—	September 10, 2007	Mount Lemmon	Mount Lemmon Survey	·	610 m	MPC · JPL
739519	2017 VO_{32}	—	December 8, 2009	La Sagra	OAM	·	1.4 km	MPC · JPL
739520	2017 VZ_{32}	—	April 24, 2006	Kitt Peak	Spacewatch	·	710 m	MPC · JPL
739521	2017 VY_{33}	—	September 29, 1994	Kitt Peak	Spacewatch	·	3.8 km	MPC · JPL
739522	2017 VD_{43}	—	April 15, 2015	Mount Lemmon	Mount Lemmon Survey	KOR	960 m	MPC · JPL
739523	2017 VM_{44}	—	November 13, 2017	Haleakala	Pan-STARRS 1	·	940 m	MPC · JPL
739524	2017 WG_{10}	—	October 2, 2006	Mount Lemmon	Mount Lemmon Survey	EMA	3.0 km	MPC · JPL
739525	2017 WM_{12}	—	April 18, 2010	WISE	WISE	L5	10 km	MPC · JPL
739526	2017 WQ_{21}	—	October 26, 2013	Mount Lemmon	Mount Lemmon Survey	(5)	890 m	MPC · JPL
739527	2017 WR_{22}	—	July 7, 2005	Mauna Kea	Veillet, C.	NYS	860 m	MPC · JPL
739528	2017 WH_{43}	—	April 23, 2014	Cerro Tololo-DECam	DECam	VER	1.9 km	MPC · JPL
739529	2017 WL_{43}	—	May 20, 2015	Cerro Tololo-DECam	DECam	·	750 m	MPC · JPL
739530	2017 WE_{44}	—	November 20, 2017	Haleakala	Pan-STARRS 1	·	1.4 km	MPC · JPL
739531	2017 WO_{49}	—	November 21, 2017	Haleakala	Pan-STARRS 1	·	530 m	MPC · JPL
739532	2017 WV_{71}	—	December 27, 2013	Kitt Peak	Spacewatch	·	1.2 km	MPC · JPL
739533	2017 XL	—	May 26, 2003	Kitt Peak	Spacewatch	H	560 m	MPC · JPL
739534	2017 XW_{3}	—	October 17, 2010	Mount Lemmon	Mount Lemmon Survey	·	520 m	MPC · JPL
739535	2017 XZ_{5}	—	December 18, 2007	Mount Lemmon	Mount Lemmon Survey	·	530 m	MPC · JPL
739536	2017 XV_{11}	—	April 16, 2005	Kitt Peak	Spacewatch	·	3.4 km	MPC · JPL
739537	2017 XN_{12}	—	June 22, 2011	Mount Lemmon	Mount Lemmon Survey	·	1.4 km	MPC · JPL
739538	2017 XJ_{14}	—	May 1, 2009	Cerro Burek	I. de la Cueva	·	5.9 km	MPC · JPL
739539	2017 XK_{15}	—	November 2, 2010	Mount Lemmon	Mount Lemmon Survey	PHO	720 m	MPC · JPL
739540	2017 XA_{21}	—	October 23, 2013	Mount Lemmon	Mount Lemmon Survey	·	1.1 km	MPC · JPL
739541	2017 XB_{26}	—	January 13, 2004	Kitt Peak	Spacewatch	·	940 m	MPC · JPL
739542	2017 XS_{27}	—	August 18, 2006	Kitt Peak	Spacewatch	MAS	590 m	MPC · JPL
739543	2017 XD_{29}	—	October 31, 2006	Mount Lemmon	Mount Lemmon Survey	THM	1.7 km	MPC · JPL
739544	2017 XJ_{31}	—	October 21, 2012	Haleakala	Pan-STARRS 1	·	1.4 km	MPC · JPL
739545	2017 XQ_{36}	—	May 13, 2005	Mount Lemmon	Mount Lemmon Survey	·	1.5 km	MPC · JPL
739546	2017 XW_{40}	—	October 27, 2006	Mount Lemmon	Mount Lemmon Survey	MAS	480 m	MPC · JPL
739547	2017 XJ_{41}	—	January 27, 2015	Haleakala	Pan-STARRS 1	·	690 m	MPC · JPL
739548	2017 XP_{41}	—	April 1, 2003	Cerro Tololo	Deep Lens Survey	·	790 m	MPC · JPL
739549	2017 XA_{49}	—	November 15, 2006	Mount Lemmon	Mount Lemmon Survey	MAS	550 m	MPC · JPL
739550	2017 XH_{54}	—	October 12, 2010	Mount Lemmon	Mount Lemmon Survey	·	490 m	MPC · JPL
739551	2017 XJ_{54}	—	October 18, 2006	Kitt Peak	Spacewatch	·	850 m	MPC · JPL
739552	2017 XJ_{56}	—	September 9, 2013	Haleakala	Pan-STARRS 1	NYS	1.0 km	MPC · JPL
739553	2017 XM_{57}	—	May 11, 2007	Mount Lemmon	Mount Lemmon Survey	MAR	730 m	MPC · JPL
739554	2017 XW_{58}	—	September 2, 2005	Palomar	NEAT	EUP	4.9 km	MPC · JPL
739555	2017 XC_{60}	—	July 29, 2010	WISE	WISE	·	2.3 km	MPC · JPL
739556	2017 XR_{62}	—	April 13, 2010	WISE	WISE	·	2.9 km	MPC · JPL
739557	2017 XT_{62}	—	July 15, 2013	Haleakala	Pan-STARRS 1	·	760 m	MPC · JPL
739558	2017 XN_{70}	—	December 2, 2012	Mount Lemmon	Mount Lemmon Survey	·	1.3 km	MPC · JPL
739559	2017 XQ_{71}	—	December 14, 2017	Mount Lemmon	Mount Lemmon Survey	·	1.2 km	MPC · JPL
739560	2017 XL_{72}	—	April 21, 2015	Cerro Tololo-DECam	DECam	·	1.2 km	MPC · JPL
739561	2017 XL_{73}	—	May 20, 2015	Cerro Tololo-DECam	DECam	·	960 m	MPC · JPL
739562	2017 XS_{79}	—	April 5, 2010	Sandlot	G. Hug	·	1.2 km	MPC · JPL
739563	2017 XN_{83}	—	February 27, 2006	Mount Lemmon	Mount Lemmon Survey	(5)	1.1 km	MPC · JPL
739564	2017 YM	—	April 14, 2008	Mount Lemmon	Mount Lemmon Survey	L5	10 km	MPC · JPL
739565	2017 YF_{2}	—	November 25, 2008	Cerro Burek	I. de la Cueva	·	2.7 km	MPC · JPL
739566	2017 YU_{2}	—	May 25, 2010	WISE	WISE	EUP	3.3 km	MPC · JPL
739567	2017 YV_{9}	—	July 12, 2010	WISE	WISE	·	3.9 km	MPC · JPL
739568	2017 YJ_{10}	—	June 27, 2010	WISE	WISE	·	3.2 km	MPC · JPL
739569	2017 YL_{12}	—	November 2, 2007	Kitt Peak	Spacewatch	KOR	1.5 km	MPC · JPL
739570	2017 YP_{12}	—	November 22, 2006	Kitt Peak	Spacewatch	EOS	2.4 km	MPC · JPL
739571	2017 YC_{13}	—	April 15, 2010	Mount Lemmon	Mount Lemmon Survey	·	1.4 km	MPC · JPL
739572	2017 YP_{18}	—	March 5, 2013	Haleakala	Pan-STARRS 1	·	2.0 km	MPC · JPL
739573	2017 YQ_{19}	—	December 24, 2017	Haleakala	Pan-STARRS 1	·	1.0 km	MPC · JPL
739574	2017 YS_{24}	—	October 13, 2007	Mount Lemmon	Mount Lemmon Survey	·	1.4 km	MPC · JPL
739575	2017 YK_{27}	—	December 23, 2017	Haleakala	Pan-STARRS 1	·	1.1 km	MPC · JPL
739576	2017 YP_{28}	—	August 14, 2001	Haleakala	NEAT	·	1.2 km	MPC · JPL
739577	2017 YD_{30}	—	December 23, 2017	Haleakala	Pan-STARRS 1	MAR	670 m	MPC · JPL
739578	2017 YJ_{33}	—	December 24, 2017	Haleakala	Pan-STARRS 1	·	1.7 km	MPC · JPL
739579	2017 YF_{41}	—	December 27, 2017	Mount Lemmon	Mount Lemmon Survey	EUN	810 m	MPC · JPL
739580	2017 YE_{42}	—	December 25, 2017	Mount Lemmon	Mount Lemmon Survey	H	430 m	MPC · JPL
739581	2017 YY_{59}	—	December 23, 2017	Haleakala	Pan-STARRS 1	·	880 m	MPC · JPL
739582	2018 AK_{5}	—	February 10, 2008	Mount Lemmon	Mount Lemmon Survey	·	3.1 km	MPC · JPL
739583	2018 AS_{5}	—	July 23, 2010	WISE	WISE	·	3.7 km	MPC · JPL
739584	2018 AO_{7}	—	September 18, 2006	Kitt Peak	Spacewatch	·	650 m	MPC · JPL
739585	2018 AP_{7}	—	November 21, 2008	Kitt Peak	Spacewatch	·	1.6 km	MPC · JPL
739586	2018 AH_{8}	—	October 1, 2005	Kitt Peak	Spacewatch	V	550 m	MPC · JPL
739587	2018 AL_{8}	—	September 4, 2008	Kitt Peak	Spacewatch	·	1.0 km	MPC · JPL
739588	2018 AP_{8}	—	March 4, 2013	Haleakala	Pan-STARRS 1	·	3.1 km	MPC · JPL
739589	2018 AN_{9}	—	January 26, 2011	Mount Lemmon	Mount Lemmon Survey	·	720 m	MPC · JPL
739590	2018 AM_{11}	—	January 9, 2013	Mount Lemmon	Mount Lemmon Survey	H	450 m	MPC · JPL
739591	2018 AU_{13}	—	June 22, 2010	WISE	WISE	·	3.9 km	MPC · JPL
739592	2018 AF_{16}	—	November 2, 2010	Mount Lemmon	Mount Lemmon Survey	·	580 m	MPC · JPL
739593	2018 AO_{17}	—	February 20, 2014	Haleakala	Pan-STARRS 1	·	1.2 km	MPC · JPL
739594	2018 AU_{26}	—	January 15, 2018	Mount Lemmon	Mount Lemmon Survey	·	1.4 km	MPC · JPL
739595	2018 AB_{27}	—	January 9, 2018	Haleakala	Pan-STARRS 1	·	1.7 km	MPC · JPL
739596	2018 AC_{27}	—	January 14, 2018	Haleakala	Pan-STARRS 1	EUN	1.1 km	MPC · JPL
739597	2018 AD_{29}	—	January 13, 2018	Mount Lemmon	Mount Lemmon Survey	·	1.5 km	MPC · JPL
739598	2018 AH_{40}	—	January 14, 2018	Haleakala	Pan-STARRS 1	L5	6.8 km	MPC · JPL
739599	2018 AJ_{40}	—	January 15, 2018	Haleakala	Pan-STARRS 1	L5	7.0 km	MPC · JPL
739600	2018 AU_{44}	—	January 11, 2018	Haleakala	Pan-STARRS 1	·	1.2 km	MPC · JPL

== 739601–739700 ==
back to top

Designation			Discovery			Properties		Ref
Permanent	Provisional	Named after	Date	Site	Discoverer(s)	Category	Diam.	Ref
739601	2018 AN_{54}	—	January 14, 2018	Haleakala	Pan-STARRS 1	·	1.6 km	MPC · JPL
739602	2018 BR_{2}	—	February 22, 2006	Catalina	CSS	·	1.8 km	MPC · JPL
739603	2018 BV_{5}	—	February 2, 2006	Kitt Peak	Spacewatch	EUP	4.2 km	MPC · JPL
739604	2018 BN_{7}	—	October 13, 2005	Kitt Peak	Spacewatch	NYS	1.0 km	MPC · JPL
739605	2018 BB_{8}	—	December 31, 1999	Kitt Peak	Spacewatch	·	1.9 km	MPC · JPL
739606	2018 BC_{9}	—	February 15, 2010	WISE	WISE	·	5.0 km	MPC · JPL
739607	2018 BK_{9}	—	February 16, 2010	WISE	WISE	·	1.7 km	MPC · JPL
739608	2018 BX_{11}	—	January 15, 2005	Kitt Peak	Spacewatch	·	1.1 km	MPC · JPL
739609	2018 BZ_{15}	—	February 2, 2009	Kitt Peak	Spacewatch	·	1.5 km	MPC · JPL
739610	2018 BT_{18}	—	January 20, 2018	Haleakala	Pan-STARRS 1	L5	6.0 km	MPC · JPL
739611	2018 BQ_{19}	—	January 31, 2009	Mount Lemmon	Mount Lemmon Survey	·	1.8 km	MPC · JPL
739612	2018 BP_{21}	—	May 20, 2015	Cerro Tololo-DECam	DECam	·	820 m	MPC · JPL
739613	2018 BD_{24}	—	May 20, 2015	Cerro Tololo-DECam	DECam	·	690 m	MPC · JPL
739614	2018 BN_{30}	—	January 16, 2018	Haleakala	Pan-STARRS 1	·	1.7 km	MPC · JPL
739615	2018 CP_{1}	—	December 25, 2017	Haleakala	Pan-STARRS 1	H	540 m	MPC · JPL
739616	2018 CB_{4}	—	January 10, 2002	Cerro Tololo	Deep Lens Survey	EUN	1.2 km	MPC · JPL
739617	2018 CA_{5}	—	January 1, 2014	Mount Lemmon	Mount Lemmon Survey	·	1.6 km	MPC · JPL
739618	2018 CN_{8}	—	March 4, 2010	WISE	WISE	·	1.6 km	MPC · JPL
739619	2018 CU_{8}	—	September 24, 2006	Kitt Peak	Spacewatch	·	3.9 km	MPC · JPL
739620	2018 CQ_{9}	—	September 22, 2004	Kitt Peak	Spacewatch	·	1.7 km	MPC · JPL
739621	2018 CR_{9}	—	January 15, 2005	Catalina	CSS	·	3.7 km	MPC · JPL
739622	2018 CM_{10}	—	April 25, 2011	Mount Lemmon	Mount Lemmon Survey	PHO	2.7 km	MPC · JPL
739623	2018 CS_{10}	—	September 24, 2008	Mount Lemmon	Mount Lemmon Survey	·	2.3 km	MPC · JPL
739624	2018 CE_{11}	—	December 21, 2006	Mount Lemmon	Mount Lemmon Survey	·	4.7 km	MPC · JPL
739625	2018 CT_{15}	—	June 17, 2010	WISE	WISE	·	1.4 km	MPC · JPL
739626	2018 CA_{16}	—	November 30, 2005	Mount Lemmon	Mount Lemmon Survey	·	1.1 km	MPC · JPL
739627	2018 CZ_{19}	—	February 12, 2018	Haleakala	Pan-STARRS 1	L5	6.2 km	MPC · JPL
739628	2018 CJ_{21}	—	February 12, 2018	Haleakala	Pan-STARRS 1	·	1.1 km	MPC · JPL
739629	2018 CL_{21}	—	February 12, 2018	Haleakala	Pan-STARRS 1	·	890 m	MPC · JPL
739630	2018 CW_{21}	—	May 20, 2015	Cerro Tololo-DECam	DECam	·	660 m	MPC · JPL
739631	2018 CZ_{21}	—	February 12, 2018	Haleakala	Pan-STARRS 1	·	770 m	MPC · JPL
739632	2018 CC_{27}	—	April 18, 2015	Cerro Tololo-DECam	DECam	·	540 m	MPC · JPL
739633	2018 DO_{2}	—	November 11, 2006	Mount Lemmon	Mount Lemmon Survey	·	500 m	MPC · JPL
739634 Zhaojingyuan	2018 DW_{6}	Zhaojingyuan	February 16, 2018	Xingming	Yin, Q., X. Gao	·	1.4 km	MPC · JPL
739635	2018 DK_{7}	—	April 28, 2014	Cerro Tololo-DECam	DECam	·	1.7 km	MPC · JPL
739636	2018 EK_{5}	—	February 20, 2018	Haleakala	Pan-STARRS 1	PHO	660 m	MPC · JPL
739637	2018 EC_{6}	—	February 7, 2010	WISE	WISE	·	2.9 km	MPC · JPL
739638	2018 EU_{6}	—	January 1, 2009	XuYi	PMO NEO Survey Program	JUN	900 m	MPC · JPL
739639	2018 EK_{7}	—	February 15, 2004	Palomar	NEAT	·	4.9 km	MPC · JPL
739640	2018 EK_{9}	—	March 18, 2005	Catalina	CSS	·	1.3 km	MPC · JPL
739641	2018 FW_{8}	—	July 31, 2010	WISE	WISE	·	2.8 km	MPC · JPL
739642	2018 FJ_{14}	—	April 7, 2010	Kitt Peak	Spacewatch	·	1.1 km	MPC · JPL
739643	2018 FK_{16}	—	October 16, 2009	Catalina	CSS	·	720 m	MPC · JPL
739644	2018 FM_{19}	—	March 24, 2009	Mount Lemmon	Mount Lemmon Survey	·	1.6 km	MPC · JPL
739645	2018 FT_{23}	—	January 7, 2006	Kitt Peak	Spacewatch	·	860 m	MPC · JPL
739646	2018 FL_{25}	—	January 11, 2002	Kitt Peak	Spacewatch	KOR	1.4 km	MPC · JPL
739647	2018 FU_{28}	—	March 7, 1994	Kitt Peak	Spacewatch	·	600 m	MPC · JPL
739648	2018 FX_{29}	—	November 11, 2009	Kitt Peak	Spacewatch	·	860 m	MPC · JPL
739649	2018 FG_{34}	—	March 28, 2018	Mount Lemmon	Mount Lemmon Survey	EUN	980 m	MPC · JPL
739650	2018 FH_{34}	—	March 18, 2018	Haleakala	Pan-STARRS 1	·	1.4 km	MPC · JPL
739651	2018 FA_{35}	—	October 24, 2011	Haleakala	Pan-STARRS 1	·	2.1 km	MPC · JPL
739652	2018 FD_{39}	—	March 20, 2018	Mount Lemmon	Mount Lemmon Survey	·	1.7 km	MPC · JPL
739653	2018 FU_{44}	—	March 19, 2018	Mount Lemmon	Mount Lemmon Survey	·	1.5 km	MPC · JPL
739654	2018 FY_{45}	—	March 17, 2018	Mount Lemmon	Mount Lemmon Survey	H	370 m	MPC · JPL
739655	2018 FN_{50}	—	March 19, 2018	Mount Lemmon	Mount Lemmon Survey	·	1.5 km	MPC · JPL
739656	2018 FO_{50}	—	November 4, 2016	Haleakala	Pan-STARRS 1	·	1.3 km	MPC · JPL
739657	2018 FS_{50}	—	December 21, 2008	Mount Lemmon	Mount Lemmon Survey	·	1.1 km	MPC · JPL
739658	2018 GA_{3}	—	October 20, 2011	Haleakala	Pan-STARRS 1	H	480 m	MPC · JPL
739659	2018 GU_{6}	—	December 19, 2007	Mount Lemmon	Mount Lemmon Survey	(32418)	2.3 km	MPC · JPL
739660	2018 GM_{7}	—	September 30, 2011	Mount Lemmon	Mount Lemmon Survey	·	1.6 km	MPC · JPL
739661	2018 GE_{9}	—	April 25, 2007	Kitt Peak	Spacewatch	MAS	720 m	MPC · JPL
739662	2018 GK_{9}	—	March 20, 2018	Mount Lemmon	Mount Lemmon Survey	AGN	1.0 km	MPC · JPL
739663	2018 GJ_{10}	—	October 14, 2001	Apache Point	SDSS Collaboration	·	1.8 km	MPC · JPL
739664	2018 GR_{10}	—	May 28, 2014	Haleakala	Pan-STARRS 1	·	1.1 km	MPC · JPL
739665	2018 GF_{11}	—	April 15, 2007	Mount Lemmon	Mount Lemmon Survey	·	2.1 km	MPC · JPL
739666	2018 GS_{12}	—	April 2, 2005	Kitt Peak	Spacewatch	·	1.9 km	MPC · JPL
739667	2018 GC_{16}	—	April 12, 2018	Haleakala	Pan-STARRS 1	·	1.3 km	MPC · JPL
739668	2018 GR_{17}	—	April 14, 2018	Mount Lemmon	Mount Lemmon Survey	HNS	810 m	MPC · JPL
739669	2018 GB_{18}	—	April 12, 2018	Haleakala	Pan-STARRS 1	·	1.1 km	MPC · JPL
739670	2018 GM_{19}	—	April 14, 2018	Mount Lemmon	Mount Lemmon Survey	·	1.6 km	MPC · JPL
739671	2018 GU_{22}	—	April 14, 2018	Mount Lemmon	Mount Lemmon Survey	·	1.6 km	MPC · JPL
739672	2018 HN_{2}	—	November 22, 2006	Mount Lemmon	Mount Lemmon Survey	·	2.1 km	MPC · JPL
739673	2018 JL_{4}	—	April 12, 2005	Kitt Peak	Spacewatch	·	1.2 km	MPC · JPL
739674	2018 JW_{4}	—	April 26, 2009	Siding Spring	SSS	·	4.1 km	MPC · JPL
739675	2018 KR_{1}	—	May 19, 2010	WISE	WISE	PHO	1.1 km	MPC · JPL
739676	2018 KV_{3}	—	April 19, 2009	Mount Lemmon	Mount Lemmon Survey	·	1.7 km	MPC · JPL
739677	2018 KD_{4}	—	July 29, 2009	Kitt Peak	Spacewatch	·	1.6 km	MPC · JPL
739678	2018 KX_{7}	—	May 19, 2018	Haleakala	Pan-STARRS 1	EOS	1.3 km	MPC · JPL
739679	2018 LO	—	June 24, 1998	Socorro	LINEAR	·	2.0 km	MPC · JPL
739680	2018 LY_{1}	—	May 16, 2010	WISE	WISE	·	2.3 km	MPC · JPL
739681	2018 LJ_{2}	—	January 12, 2010	WISE	WISE	T_{j} (2.99) · EUP	3.6 km	MPC · JPL
739682	2018 LN_{3}	—	June 10, 2018	Haleakala	Pan-STARRS 2	H	440 m	MPC · JPL
739683	2018 LH_{9}	—	December 11, 2004	Kitt Peak	Spacewatch	·	5.1 km	MPC · JPL
739684	2018 LF_{10}	—	January 25, 2010	WISE	WISE	·	3.9 km	MPC · JPL
739685	2018 LT_{14}	—	June 12, 2010	WISE	WISE	·	1.2 km	MPC · JPL
739686	2018 LD_{22}	—	June 12, 2018	Haleakala	Pan-STARRS 1	H	430 m	MPC · JPL
739687	2018 LU_{29}	—	June 8, 2018	Haleakala	Pan-STARRS 1	MAR	660 m	MPC · JPL
739688	2018 LR_{48}	—	June 6, 2018	Haleakala	Pan-STARRS 1	·	1.5 km	MPC · JPL
739689	2018 MT_{1}	—	May 7, 2014	Haleakala	Pan-STARRS 1	·	890 m	MPC · JPL
739690	2018 MJ_{2}	—	February 21, 2012	Mount Lemmon	Mount Lemmon Survey	·	2.3 km	MPC · JPL
739691	2018 MH_{3}	—	March 16, 2012	Mount Lemmon	Mount Lemmon Survey	·	1.9 km	MPC · JPL
739692	2018 MX_{20}	—	May 9, 2014	Haleakala	Pan-STARRS 1	·	760 m	MPC · JPL
739693	2018 NY_{4}	—	November 2, 2008	Catalina	CSS	TIR	3.8 km	MPC · JPL
739694	2018 NA_{5}	—	January 12, 2010	Mount Lemmon	Mount Lemmon Survey	·	4.7 km	MPC · JPL
739695	2018 NS_{6}	—	January 28, 2011	Mount Lemmon	Mount Lemmon Survey	EOS	1.7 km	MPC · JPL
739696	2018 NC_{7}	—	September 6, 2013	Kitt Peak	Spacewatch	HYG	2.3 km	MPC · JPL
739697	2018 NO_{7}	—	September 28, 2003	Apache Point	SDSS	·	2.9 km	MPC · JPL
739698	2018 NM_{13}	—	October 13, 2010	Mount Lemmon	Mount Lemmon Survey	·	1.5 km	MPC · JPL
739699	2018 NY_{27}	—	July 8, 2018	Haleakala	Pan-STARRS 1	·	2.0 km	MPC · JPL
739700	2018 NA_{35}	—	July 10, 2018	Haleakala	Pan-STARRS 1	·	1.6 km	MPC · JPL

== 739701–739800 ==
back to top

Designation			Discovery			Properties		Ref
Permanent	Provisional	Named after	Date	Site	Discoverer(s)	Category	Diam.	Ref
739701	2018 NB_{39}	—	July 12, 2018	Haleakala	Pan-STARRS 2	EOS	1.6 km	MPC · JPL
739702	2018 PA	—	December 24, 2015	Haleakala	Pan-STARRS 1	PHO	1.5 km	MPC · JPL
739703	2018 PP_{1}	—	November 6, 2008	Mount Lemmon	Mount Lemmon Survey	·	2.9 km	MPC · JPL
739704	2018 PA_{2}	—	February 16, 2010	WISE	WISE	·	1.4 km	MPC · JPL
739705	2018 PS_{6}	—	June 10, 2010	WISE	WISE	·	1.0 km	MPC · JPL
739706	2018 PD_{12}	—	January 23, 2006	Kitt Peak	Spacewatch	·	1.8 km	MPC · JPL
739707	2018 PL_{15}	—	November 11, 2013	Mount Lemmon	Mount Lemmon Survey	·	3.0 km	MPC · JPL
739708	2018 PE_{16}	—	September 14, 2007	Kitt Peak	Spacewatch	HYG	2.8 km	MPC · JPL
739709	2018 PS_{27}	—	March 30, 2010	WISE	WISE	·	3.7 km	MPC · JPL
739710	2018 PH_{42}	—	July 12, 2018	Haleakala	Pan-STARRS 1	·	2.6 km	MPC · JPL
739711	2018 PH_{43}	—	August 7, 2018	Haleakala	Pan-STARRS 1	·	1.5 km	MPC · JPL
739712	2018 PL_{60}	—	January 8, 2016	Haleakala	Pan-STARRS 1	·	2.7 km	MPC · JPL
739713	2018 PR_{64}	—	May 1, 2011	Haleakala	Pan-STARRS 1	·	2.4 km	MPC · JPL
739714	2018 QM	—	April 12, 2015	Haleakala	Pan-STARRS 1	H	340 m	MPC · JPL
739715	2018 QO_{5}	—	January 8, 2008	Mauna Kea	F. Bernardi, M. Micheli	·	1.1 km	MPC · JPL
739716	2018 QP_{5}	—	November 17, 2008	Kitt Peak	Spacewatch	·	1.9 km	MPC · JPL
739717	2018 QY_{12}	—	September 15, 2013	Haleakala	Pan-STARRS 1	·	1.2 km	MPC · JPL
739718	2018 RJ	—	March 18, 2009	Catalina	CSS	H	580 m	MPC · JPL
739719	2018 RN_{11}	—	September 11, 2002	Palomar	NEAT	·	2.8 km	MPC · JPL
739720	2018 RG_{14}	—	March 10, 2008	Kitt Peak	Spacewatch	·	2.8 km	MPC · JPL
739721	2018 RW_{14}	—	May 27, 2010	WISE	WISE	·	2.8 km	MPC · JPL
739722	2018 RL_{19}	—	June 18, 2006	Kitt Peak	Spacewatch	·	2.6 km	MPC · JPL
739723	2018 RA_{21}	—	March 19, 2009	Mount Lemmon	Mount Lemmon Survey	·	4.3 km	MPC · JPL
739724	2018 RW_{21}	—	March 11, 2005	Mount Lemmon	Mount Lemmon Survey	·	2.3 km	MPC · JPL
739725	2018 RF_{22}	—	December 6, 2008	Kitt Peak	Spacewatch	·	2.7 km	MPC · JPL
739726	2018 RY_{22}	—	September 20, 1995	La Silla	C.-I. Lagerkvist	·	1.7 km	MPC · JPL
739727	2018 RG_{23}	—	November 27, 2009	Mount Lemmon	Mount Lemmon Survey	·	1.9 km	MPC · JPL
739728	2018 RR_{23}	—	October 27, 2008	Kitt Peak	Spacewatch	·	1.9 km	MPC · JPL
739729	2018 RM_{24}	—	March 20, 1999	Apache Point	SDSS Collaboration	·	3.0 km	MPC · JPL
739730	2018 RQ_{30}	—	March 17, 2005	Kitt Peak	Spacewatch	·	3.4 km	MPC · JPL
739731	2018 RJ_{31}	—	July 17, 2010	WISE	WISE	·	1.3 km	MPC · JPL
739732	2018 RR_{31}	—	October 11, 2007	Catalina	CSS	·	1.8 km	MPC · JPL
739733	2018 RW_{31}	—	January 22, 2002	Kitt Peak	Spacewatch	·	1.9 km	MPC · JPL
739734	2018 RL_{33}	—	October 3, 2006	Mount Lemmon	Mount Lemmon Survey	·	4.8 km	MPC · JPL
739735	2018 RO_{33}	—	March 14, 2005	Mount Lemmon	Mount Lemmon Survey	·	3.1 km	MPC · JPL
739736	2018 RU_{33}	—	October 10, 2002	Palomar	NEAT	·	2.8 km	MPC · JPL
739737	2018 RU_{34}	—	February 13, 2010	Mount Lemmon	Mount Lemmon Survey	·	3.6 km	MPC · JPL
739738	2018 RH_{35}	—	April 8, 2010	WISE	WISE	PHO	770 m	MPC · JPL
739739	2018 RJ_{38}	—	December 26, 2005	Kitt Peak	Spacewatch	DOR	3.1 km	MPC · JPL
739740	2018 RS_{48}	—	September 7, 2018	Mount Lemmon	Mount Lemmon Survey	·	1.6 km	MPC · JPL
739741	2018 RT_{48}	—	September 10, 2018	Mount Lemmon	Mount Lemmon Survey	·	2.8 km	MPC · JPL
739742	2018 RD_{55}	—	May 1, 2016	Cerro Tololo-DECam	DECam	·	2.4 km	MPC · JPL
739743	2018 RG_{56}	—	September 12, 2018	Mount Lemmon	Mount Lemmon Survey	·	1.3 km	MPC · JPL
739744	2018 RK_{57}	—	March 12, 2016	Haleakala	Pan-STARRS 1	·	2.3 km	MPC · JPL
739745	2018 RG_{62}	—	September 11, 2018	Mount Lemmon	Mount Lemmon Survey	VER	2.3 km	MPC · JPL
739746	2018 SZ_{1}	—	June 11, 2007	Siding Spring	SSS	PHO	1.4 km	MPC · JPL
739747	2018 SN_{5}	—	June 22, 2006	Kitt Peak	Spacewatch	·	3.4 km	MPC · JPL
739748	2018 SO_{6}	—	August 19, 2001	Socorro	LINEAR	EUP	4.4 km	MPC · JPL
739749	2018 SJ_{8}	—	September 6, 2018	Mount Lemmon	Mount Lemmon Survey	·	1.4 km	MPC · JPL
739750	2018 SP_{9}	—	January 25, 2006	Kitt Peak	Spacewatch	·	2.0 km	MPC · JPL
739751	2018 SH_{10}	—	October 16, 2007	Kitt Peak	Spacewatch	·	2.8 km	MPC · JPL
739752	2018 SW_{10}	—	February 28, 2006	Mount Lemmon	Mount Lemmon Survey	·	2.5 km	MPC · JPL
739753	2018 SE_{11}	—	July 19, 2010	WISE	WISE	·	1.3 km	MPC · JPL
739754	2018 SY_{11}	—	March 11, 2005	Mount Lemmon	Mount Lemmon Survey	·	3.4 km	MPC · JPL
739755	2018 SV_{12}	—	August 8, 2010	WISE	WISE	KRM	2.0 km	MPC · JPL
739756	2018 SG_{13}	—	January 27, 2003	Palomar	NEAT	·	4.2 km	MPC · JPL
739757	2018 SJ_{13}	—	March 15, 2010	WISE	WISE	·	4.1 km	MPC · JPL
739758	2018 SK_{13}	—	May 24, 2010	WISE	WISE	(1118)	3.1 km	MPC · JPL
739759	2018 SB_{17}	—	July 28, 2012	Haleakala	Pan-STARRS 1	·	2.1 km	MPC · JPL
739760	2018 SO_{19}	—	September 30, 2018	Mount Lemmon	Mount Lemmon Survey	·	1.5 km	MPC · JPL
739761	2018 TA_{10}	—	August 17, 2012	Haleakala	Pan-STARRS 1	·	2.2 km	MPC · JPL
739762	2018 TS_{11}	—	October 5, 2018	Mount Lemmon	Mount Lemmon Survey	EOS	1.6 km	MPC · JPL
739763	2018 TE_{12}	—	December 3, 2008	Mount Lemmon	Mount Lemmon Survey	·	4.3 km	MPC · JPL
739764	2018 TC_{13}	—	March 19, 2013	Haleakala	Pan-STARRS 1	V	700 m	MPC · JPL
739765	2018 TQ_{25}	—	October 4, 2018	Haleakala	Pan-STARRS 2	EOS	1.4 km	MPC · JPL
739766	2018 TX_{25}	—	May 3, 2016	Cerro Tololo-DECam	DECam	·	2.5 km	MPC · JPL
739767	2018 TB_{26}	—	May 1, 2016	Haleakala	Pan-STARRS 1	·	2.5 km	MPC · JPL
739768	2018 TH_{29}	—	October 6, 2018	Mount Lemmon	Mount Lemmon Survey	EOS	1.5 km	MPC · JPL
739769	2018 TE_{34}	—	October 10, 2018	Haleakala	Pan-STARRS 2	·	1.9 km	MPC · JPL
739770	2018 TF_{34}	—	March 5, 2016	Haleakala	Pan-STARRS 1	EOS	1.6 km	MPC · JPL
739771	2018 TG_{34}	—	June 25, 2017	Haleakala	Pan-STARRS 1	·	2.0 km	MPC · JPL
739772	2018 TL_{36}	—	February 23, 2015	Haleakala	Pan-STARRS 1	·	1.6 km	MPC · JPL
739773	2018 TQ_{44}	—	October 4, 2018	Haleakala	Pan-STARRS 2	TIR	2.4 km	MPC · JPL
739774	2018 UE_{2}	—	December 19, 2007	Mount Lemmon	Mount Lemmon Survey	H	440 m	MPC · JPL
739775	2018 UO_{2}	—	January 12, 2011	Mount Lemmon	Mount Lemmon Survey	H	550 m	MPC · JPL
739776	2018 UU_{3}	—	June 2, 2010	WISE	WISE	EUP	3.2 km	MPC · JPL
739777	2018 UJ_{5}	—	June 24, 2000	Kitt Peak	Spacewatch	ARM	4.2 km	MPC · JPL
739778	2018 UY_{6}	—	September 19, 2003	Campo Imperatore	CINEOS	·	2.3 km	MPC · JPL
739779	2018 UP_{10}	—	May 8, 2010	WISE	WISE	ULA	4.9 km	MPC · JPL
739780	2018 UV_{10}	—	October 22, 2003	Apache Point	SDSS	·	2.1 km	MPC · JPL
739781	2018 UE_{13}	—	July 11, 2010	WISE	WISE	·	3.6 km	MPC · JPL
739782	2018 UD_{26}	—	December 31, 2013	Mount Lemmon	Mount Lemmon Survey	·	2.5 km	MPC · JPL
739783	2018 UB_{38}	—	October 18, 2018	Mount Lemmon	Mount Lemmon Survey	EOS	1.5 km	MPC · JPL
739784	2018 UR_{41}	—	October 18, 2018	Mount Lemmon	Mount Lemmon Survey	·	1.7 km	MPC · JPL
739785	2018 VS_{13}	—	September 13, 2007	Mount Lemmon	Mount Lemmon Survey	·	2.3 km	MPC · JPL
739786	2018 VQ_{14}	—	February 16, 2015	Haleakala	Pan-STARRS 1	·	3.1 km	MPC · JPL
739787	2018 VY_{19}	—	December 11, 2013	Mount Lemmon	Mount Lemmon Survey	TIR	2.3 km	MPC · JPL
739788	2018 VB_{21}	—	October 9, 2004	Kitt Peak	Spacewatch	·	2.1 km	MPC · JPL
739789	2018 VP_{23}	—	November 27, 2013	Haleakala	Pan-STARRS 1	EOS	1.9 km	MPC · JPL
739790	2018 VF_{24}	—	May 23, 2001	Cerro Tololo	Deep Ecliptic Survey	·	3.3 km	MPC · JPL
739791	2018 VN_{25}	—	December 1, 2008	Kitt Peak	Spacewatch	·	2.9 km	MPC · JPL
739792	2018 VJ_{31}	—	January 3, 2009	Kitt Peak	Spacewatch	·	550 m	MPC · JPL
739793	2018 VN_{33}	—	December 1, 2008	Tzec Maun	E. Schwab	·	550 m	MPC · JPL
739794	2018 VY_{34}	—	February 22, 2014	Mount Lemmon	Mount Lemmon Survey	T_{j} (2.99) · EUP	3.7 km	MPC · JPL
739795	2018 VH_{43}	—	October 12, 2013	Mount Lemmon	Mount Lemmon Survey	·	2.1 km	MPC · JPL
739796	2018 VW_{43}	—	January 4, 2016	Haleakala	Pan-STARRS 1	(2076)	610 m	MPC · JPL
739797	2018 VT_{46}	—	November 30, 2008	Mount Lemmon	Mount Lemmon Survey	·	1.9 km	MPC · JPL
739798	2018 VP_{51}	—	November 24, 2000	Kitt Peak	Deep Lens Survey	·	1.6 km	MPC · JPL
739799	2018 VX_{55}	—	March 23, 2012	Mount Lemmon	Mount Lemmon Survey	·	1.3 km	MPC · JPL
739800	2018 VZ_{56}	—	February 27, 2015	Haleakala	Pan-STARRS 1	·	1.9 km	MPC · JPL

== 739801–739900 ==
back to top

Designation			Discovery			Properties		Ref
Permanent	Provisional	Named after	Date	Site	Discoverer(s)	Category	Diam.	Ref
739801	2018 VX_{63}	—	May 31, 2009	Mount Lemmon	Mount Lemmon Survey	H	510 m	MPC · JPL
739802	2018 VO_{70}	—	June 4, 2005	Kitt Peak	Spacewatch	·	3.6 km	MPC · JPL
739803	2018 VS_{70}	—	September 29, 2009	Mount Lemmon	Mount Lemmon Survey	·	1.7 km	MPC · JPL
739804	2018 VY_{73}	—	September 15, 2012	Catalina	CSS	·	2.6 km	MPC · JPL
739805	2018 VS_{75}	—	November 20, 2007	Mount Lemmon	Mount Lemmon Survey	·	4.0 km	MPC · JPL
739806	2018 VK_{77}	—	November 4, 2005	Kitt Peak	Spacewatch	·	1.8 km	MPC · JPL
739807	2018 VK_{79}	—	February 6, 2016	Haleakala	Pan-STARRS 1	·	700 m	MPC · JPL
739808	2018 VR_{80}	—	September 21, 2001	Apache Point	SDSS Collaboration	·	1.2 km	MPC · JPL
739809	2018 VU_{82}	—	January 1, 2009	Kitt Peak	Spacewatch	·	2.3 km	MPC · JPL
739810	2018 VE_{86}	—	January 31, 2009	Mount Lemmon	Mount Lemmon Survey	·	4.1 km	MPC · JPL
739811	2018 VX_{86}	—	June 16, 2010	WISE	WISE	·	3.9 km	MPC · JPL
739812	2018 VS_{87}	—	August 19, 2006	Kitt Peak	Spacewatch	·	2.1 km	MPC · JPL
739813	2018 VN_{93}	—	June 11, 2010	WISE	WISE	·	2.6 km	MPC · JPL
739814	2018 VD_{100}	—	December 4, 2005	Kitt Peak	Spacewatch	·	1.5 km	MPC · JPL
739815	2018 VX_{102}	—	October 23, 2009	Mount Lemmon	Mount Lemmon Survey	·	1.6 km	MPC · JPL
739816	2018 VB_{106}	—	February 1, 2006	Mount Lemmon	Mount Lemmon Survey	·	1.2 km	MPC · JPL
739817	2018 VL_{107}	—	April 17, 2005	Kitt Peak	Spacewatch	EOS	2.2 km	MPC · JPL
739818	2018 VB_{109}	—	November 11, 2009	Mount Lemmon	Mount Lemmon Survey	·	2.0 km	MPC · JPL
739819	2018 VN_{109}	—	February 8, 2008	Mount Lemmon	Mount Lemmon Survey	·	970 m	MPC · JPL
739820	2018 VG_{110}	—	September 21, 2001	Apache Point	SDSS Collaboration	·	2.4 km	MPC · JPL
739821	2018 VY_{110}	—	November 15, 2003	Kitt Peak	Spacewatch	·	930 m	MPC · JPL
739822	2018 VM_{111}	—	January 28, 2015	Haleakala	Pan-STARRS 1	VER	2.6 km	MPC · JPL
739823	2018 VM_{112}	—	September 15, 2007	Mount Lemmon	Mount Lemmon Survey	·	3.4 km	MPC · JPL
739824	2018 VB_{122}	—	November 7, 2018	Mount Lemmon	Mount Lemmon Survey	·	1.6 km	MPC · JPL
739825	2018 VD_{122}	—	October 10, 2018	Mount Lemmon	Mount Lemmon Survey	EOS	1.6 km	MPC · JPL
739826	2018 VH_{122}	—	November 7, 2018	Mount Lemmon	Mount Lemmon Survey	(31811)	2.2 km	MPC · JPL
739827	2018 VT_{122}	—	April 18, 2015	Cerro Tololo-DECam	DECam	TIR	2.0 km	MPC · JPL
739828	2018 VW_{122}	—	November 2, 2018	Mount Lemmon	Mount Lemmon Survey	·	3.0 km	MPC · JPL
739829	2018 VE_{123}	—	November 9, 2018	Mount Lemmon	Mount Lemmon Survey	·	3.1 km	MPC · JPL
739830	2018 VF_{128}	—	October 10, 2018	Mount Lemmon	Mount Lemmon Survey	·	1.5 km	MPC · JPL
739831	2018 VP_{128}	—	June 14, 2010	WISE	WISE	·	2.2 km	MPC · JPL
739832	2018 VY_{138}	—	March 27, 2015	Mount Lemmon	Mount Lemmon Survey	LUT	3.4 km	MPC · JPL
739833	2018 VX_{139}	—	July 25, 2017	Haleakala	Pan-STARRS 1	EMA	2.2 km	MPC · JPL
739834	2018 VV_{140}	—	November 9, 2018	Mount Lemmon	Mount Lemmon Survey	VER	2.1 km	MPC · JPL
739835	2018 VB_{141}	—	October 12, 2013	Mount Lemmon	Mount Lemmon Survey	·	1.9 km	MPC · JPL
739836	2018 WH_{5}	—	November 17, 2018	Mount Lemmon	Mount Lemmon Survey	·	3.0 km	MPC · JPL
739837	2018 WF_{13}	—	November 29, 2018	Mount Lemmon	Mount Lemmon Survey	·	1.1 km	MPC · JPL
739838	2018 XD_{8}	—	August 13, 2006	Palomar	NEAT	·	3.9 km	MPC · JPL
739839	2018 XS_{8}	—	November 26, 2009	Mount Lemmon	Mount Lemmon Survey	·	1.5 km	MPC · JPL
739840	2018 XG_{15}	—	January 19, 2010	WISE	WISE	·	2.4 km	MPC · JPL
739841	2018 XC_{16}	—	November 16, 2011	Kitt Peak	Spacewatch	·	570 m	MPC · JPL
739842	2018 XA_{18}	—	March 4, 2016	Haleakala	Pan-STARRS 1	RAF	880 m	MPC · JPL
739843	2018 XB_{18}	—	December 4, 2008	Catalina	CSS	TRE	2.8 km	MPC · JPL
739844	2018 XH_{18}	—	January 16, 2010	WISE	WISE	·	3.2 km	MPC · JPL
739845	2018 XR_{28}	—	September 18, 2017	Kitt Peak	Spacewatch	·	2.8 km	MPC · JPL
739846	2019 AY_{18}	—	April 12, 2010	WISE	WISE	·	2.2 km	MPC · JPL
739847	2019 AL_{20}	—	January 3, 1997	Kitt Peak	Spacewatch	·	4.2 km	MPC · JPL
739848	2019 AY_{21}	—	March 26, 2009	Kitt Peak	Spacewatch	·	600 m	MPC · JPL
739849	2019 AT_{22}	—	June 19, 2010	WISE	WISE	·	3.3 km	MPC · JPL
739850	2019 AW_{24}	—	November 13, 2004	Catalina	CSS	·	2.8 km	MPC · JPL
739851	2019 AA_{25}	—	September 17, 2009	Catalina	CSS	·	2.0 km	MPC · JPL
739852	2019 AJ_{25}	—	October 18, 2009	Mount Lemmon	Mount Lemmon Survey	T_{j} (2.98) · 3:2	4.9 km	MPC · JPL
739853	2019 AZ_{25}	—	September 26, 2003	Apache Point	SDSS Collaboration	AGN	910 m	MPC · JPL
739854	2019 AJ_{26}	—	May 10, 2007	Catalina	CSS	·	3.6 km	MPC · JPL
739855	2019 AN_{27}	—	July 8, 2003	Palomar	NEAT	·	740 m	MPC · JPL
739856	2019 AZ_{28}	—	July 17, 2010	WISE	WISE	EUP	4.9 km	MPC · JPL
739857	2019 AG_{30}	—	March 31, 2010	WISE	WISE	·	5.0 km	MPC · JPL
739858	2019 AD_{31}	—	January 25, 2010	WISE	WISE	·	2.1 km	MPC · JPL
739859	2019 AR_{31}	—	October 31, 2006	Mount Lemmon	Mount Lemmon Survey	·	5.4 km	MPC · JPL
739860	2019 AZ_{34}	—	January 9, 2019	Haleakala	Pan-STARRS 1	·	520 m	MPC · JPL
739861	2019 AB_{36}	—	January 11, 2008	Kitt Peak	Spacewatch	·	920 m	MPC · JPL
739862	2019 AP_{36}	—	December 7, 2005	Kitt Peak	Spacewatch	MIS	1.8 km	MPC · JPL
739863	2019 AU_{36}	—	May 18, 2010	WISE	WISE	·	3.2 km	MPC · JPL
739864	2019 AZ_{36}	—	February 1, 2009	Mount Lemmon	Mount Lemmon Survey	·	580 m	MPC · JPL
739865	2019 AE_{38}	—	March 26, 2010	WISE	WISE	·	2.2 km	MPC · JPL
739866	2019 AF_{39}	—	December 16, 2007	Mount Lemmon	Mount Lemmon Survey	·	5.1 km	MPC · JPL
739867	2019 AJ_{43}	—	October 16, 2014	Mount Lemmon	Mount Lemmon Survey	·	940 m	MPC · JPL
739868	2019 AL_{43}	—	December 24, 2006	Kitt Peak	Spacewatch	·	1.5 km	MPC · JPL
739869	2019 AH_{44}	—	November 13, 2006	Mount Lemmon	Mount Lemmon Survey	·	3.6 km	MPC · JPL
739870	2019 AP_{44}	—	December 5, 2007	Catalina	CSS	·	3.0 km	MPC · JPL
739871	2019 AA_{52}	—	January 14, 2019	Haleakala	Pan-STARRS 1	·	1.1 km	MPC · JPL
739872	2019 AC_{55}	—	September 15, 2017	Haleakala	Pan-STARRS 1	·	970 m	MPC · JPL
739873	2019 AK_{55}	—	April 17, 2015	Cerro Tololo-DECam	DECam	·	1.5 km	MPC · JPL
739874	2019 AJ_{59}	—	January 7, 2019	Haleakala	Pan-STARRS 1	VER	2.2 km	MPC · JPL
739875	2019 AM_{61}	—	April 18, 2015	Cerro Tololo-DECam	DECam	·	1.9 km	MPC · JPL
739876	2019 AF_{62}	—	January 8, 2019	Haleakala	Pan-STARRS 1	·	1.2 km	MPC · JPL
739877	2019 AZ_{81}	—	January 29, 2003	Apache Point	SDSS Collaboration	EOS	1.7 km	MPC · JPL
739878	2019 AJ_{91}	—	November 26, 2014	Haleakala	Pan-STARRS 1	V	470 m	MPC · JPL
739879	2019 AR_{91}	—	April 18, 2015	Cerro Tololo-DECam	DECam	KON	1.7 km	MPC · JPL
739880	2019 BL_{5}	—	May 15, 2010	WISE	WISE	·	2.6 km	MPC · JPL
739881	2019 BB_{7}	—	November 18, 2008	Kitt Peak	Spacewatch	DOR	2.9 km	MPC · JPL
739882	2019 BO_{10}	—	January 16, 2019	Haleakala	Pan-STARRS 1	VER	2.3 km	MPC · JPL
739883	2019 CT_{6}	—	February 26, 2009	Mount Lemmon	Mount Lemmon Survey	·	1.5 km	MPC · JPL
739884	2019 CY_{7}	—	September 6, 2008	Kitt Peak	Spacewatch	3:2	4.3 km	MPC · JPL
739885	2019 CN_{10}	—	February 13, 2010	WISE	WISE	·	1.6 km	MPC · JPL
739886	2019 CK_{13}	—	February 4, 2019	Haleakala	Pan-STARRS 1	V	500 m	MPC · JPL
739887	2019 CR_{26}	—	February 9, 2019	Mount Lemmon	Mount Lemmon Survey	·	760 m	MPC · JPL
739888	2019 EV	—	February 25, 2009	Siding Spring	SSS	PHO	1.1 km	MPC · JPL
739889	2019 FB_{4}	—	February 2, 2006	Kitt Peak	Spacewatch	·	2.0 km	MPC · JPL
739890	2019 FD_{4}	—	January 7, 2006	Kitt Peak	Spacewatch	·	2.2 km	MPC · JPL
739891	2019 FX_{4}	—	March 27, 2006	Siding Spring	SSS	·	1.9 km	MPC · JPL
739892	2019 FG_{18}	—	March 31, 2019	Mount Lemmon	Mount Lemmon Survey	AEO	1.1 km	MPC · JPL
739893	2019 FG_{20}	—	August 24, 2011	Haleakala	Pan-STARRS 1	L5	7.4 km	MPC · JPL
739894	2019 GT_{6}	—	April 25, 2006	Kitt Peak	Spacewatch	·	640 m	MPC · JPL
739895	2019 GA_{7}	—	March 28, 2010	WISE	WISE	·	2.7 km	MPC · JPL
739896	2019 GQ_{7}	—	November 2, 2007	Mount Lemmon	Mount Lemmon Survey	·	690 m	MPC · JPL
739897	2019 GW_{7}	—	January 16, 2005	Kitt Peak	Spacewatch	L5	10 km	MPC · JPL
739898	2019 GX_{7}	—	March 29, 2012	Catalina	CSS	·	630 m	MPC · JPL
739899	2019 GH_{8}	—	April 15, 2010	Catalina	CSS	·	2.2 km	MPC · JPL
739900	2019 GP_{8}	—	February 13, 2002	Kitt Peak	Spacewatch	·	1.4 km	MPC · JPL

== 739901–740000 ==
back to top

Designation			Discovery			Properties		Ref
Permanent	Provisional	Named after	Date	Site	Discoverer(s)	Category	Diam.	Ref
739901	2019 GP_{9}	—	March 23, 2006	Mount Lemmon	Mount Lemmon Survey	·	870 m	MPC · JPL
739902	2019 GU_{13}	—	February 21, 2002	Kitt Peak	Spacewatch	·	1 km	MPC · JPL
739903	2019 GX_{16}	—	September 14, 1999	Kitt Peak	Spacewatch	·	1.1 km	MPC · JPL
739904	2019 GL_{35}	—	November 7, 2005	Mauna Kea	A. Boattini	·	850 m	MPC · JPL
739905	2019 GY_{48}	—	February 1, 2006	Kitt Peak	Spacewatch	·	1.1 km	MPC · JPL
739906	2019 GZ_{49}	—	April 3, 2019	Haleakala	Pan-STARRS 1	·	1.1 km	MPC · JPL
739907	2019 GF_{50}	—	April 2, 2019	Haleakala	Pan-STARRS 1	·	800 m	MPC · JPL
739908	2019 GM_{50}	—	April 2, 2019	Haleakala	Pan-STARRS 1	L5	6.9 km	MPC · JPL
739909	2019 GR_{50}	—	April 7, 2019	Haleakala	Pan-STARRS 1	L5	5.6 km	MPC · JPL
739910	2019 GR_{52}	—	April 6, 2019	Haleakala	Pan-STARRS 1	L5	7.4 km	MPC · JPL
739911	2019 GP_{56}	—	April 15, 2019	Mount Lemmon	Mount Lemmon Survey	JUN	910 m	MPC · JPL
739912	2019 GH_{58}	—	April 3, 2019	Haleakala	Pan-STARRS 1	·	1.3 km	MPC · JPL
739913	2019 GN_{58}	—	April 3, 2019	Haleakala	Pan-STARRS 1	L5	6.3 km	MPC · JPL
739914	2019 GO_{58}	—	April 7, 2019	Haleakala	Pan-STARRS 1	L5	9.3 km	MPC · JPL
739915	2019 GW_{69}	—	April 3, 2019	Cerro Tololo	DECam	KOR	930 m	MPC · JPL
739916	2019 GL_{73}	—	April 4, 2019	Haleakala	Pan-STARRS 1	·	700 m	MPC · JPL
739917	2019 GY_{101}	—	April 25, 2015	Haleakala	Pan-STARRS 1	·	980 m	MPC · JPL
739918	2019 GP_{114}	—	August 10, 2015	Haleakala	Pan-STARRS 1	·	2.3 km	MPC · JPL
739919	2019 GW_{124}	—	October 17, 2012	Mount Lemmon	Mount Lemmon Survey	·	1.4 km	MPC · JPL
739920	2019 GW_{177}	—	April 2, 2019	Haleakala	Pan-STARRS 1	L5	5.8 km	MPC · JPL
739921	2019 HX	—	April 24, 2014	Mount Lemmon	Mount Lemmon Survey	·	2.5 km	MPC · JPL
739922	2019 HZ	—	November 6, 2005	Mount Lemmon	Mount Lemmon Survey	·	3.7 km	MPC · JPL
739923	2019 HD_{3}	—	December 11, 2012	Mount Lemmon	Mount Lemmon Survey	H	650 m	MPC · JPL
739924	2019 HD_{5}	—	December 31, 2013	Mount Lemmon	Mount Lemmon Survey	·	920 m	MPC · JPL
739925	2019 JZ_{5}	—	January 17, 2010	WISE	WISE	L4	10 km	MPC · JPL
739926	2019 JQ_{9}	—	March 4, 2010	Kitt Peak	Spacewatch	·	1.3 km	MPC · JPL
739927	2019 JD_{13}	—	August 28, 2016	Mount Lemmon	Mount Lemmon Survey	·	920 m	MPC · JPL
739928	2019 JK_{16}	—	February 26, 2014	Haleakala	Pan-STARRS 1	AGN	970 m	MPC · JPL
739929	2019 JM_{16}	—	May 5, 2010	WISE	WISE	·	2.0 km	MPC · JPL
739930	2019 JF_{24}	—	June 5, 2016	Haleakala	Pan-STARRS 1	PHO	620 m	MPC · JPL
739931	2019 JA_{59}	—	May 2, 2008	Kitt Peak	Spacewatch	·	830 m	MPC · JPL
739932	2019 JY_{61}	—	May 1, 2019	Haleakala	Pan-STARRS 1	·	1.0 km	MPC · JPL
739933	2019 JC_{62}	—	May 12, 2019	Haleakala	Pan-STARRS 1	·	1.3 km	MPC · JPL
739934	2019 JD_{62}	—	November 28, 2005	Kitt Peak	Spacewatch	·	2.8 km	MPC · JPL
739935	2019 JH_{63}	—	May 5, 2019	Cerro Tololo-DECam	DECam	(5)	1.2 km	MPC · JPL
739936	2019 JL_{63}	—	May 1, 2019	Haleakala	Pan-STARRS 1	·	870 m	MPC · JPL
739937	2019 JX_{65}	—	May 2, 2019	Haleakala	Pan-STARRS 1	·	900 m	MPC · JPL
739938	2019 JS_{66}	—	May 10, 2019	Haleakala	Pan-STARRS 1	·	2.7 km	MPC · JPL
739939	2019 JE_{75}	—	May 8, 2019	Haleakala	Pan-STARRS 1	·	900 m	MPC · JPL
739940	2019 JW_{113}	—	February 26, 2014	Haleakala	Pan-STARRS 1	·	1.4 km	MPC · JPL
739941	2019 KO_{3}	—	October 23, 2013	Haleakala	Pan-STARRS 1	L5	7.2 km	MPC · JPL
739942	2019 KS_{4}	—	January 27, 2006	Kitt Peak	Spacewatch	L5	9.4 km	MPC · JPL
739943	2019 KG_{5}	—	February 2, 2010	WISE	WISE	L4	10 km	MPC · JPL
739944	2019 KA_{7}	—	May 31, 2010	WISE	WISE	·	4.1 km	MPC · JPL
739945	2019 KH_{9}	—	May 4, 2008	Kitt Peak	Spacewatch	·	2.2 km	MPC · JPL
739946	2019 KR_{19}	—	May 27, 2019	Haleakala	Pan-STARRS 1	·	860 m	MPC · JPL
739947	2019 KU_{19}	—	May 29, 2019	Haleakala	Pan-STARRS 1	·	1.4 km	MPC · JPL
739948	2019 KW_{19}	—	April 23, 2014	Cerro Tololo-DECam	DECam	AST	1.2 km	MPC · JPL
739949	2019 KH_{26}	—	January 31, 2015	Haleakala	Pan-STARRS 1	·	1.2 km	MPC · JPL
739950	2019 KB_{29}	—	May 25, 2019	Haleakala	Pan-STARRS 1	·	950 m	MPC · JPL
739951	2019 LH	—	December 24, 2011	Mount Lemmon	Mount Lemmon Survey	L4 · 006	10 km	MPC · JPL
739952	2019 MA_{1}	—	February 9, 2008	Mount Lemmon	Mount Lemmon Survey	T_{j} (2.87)	3.3 km	MPC · JPL
739953	2019 MK_{3}	—	April 30, 2008	Kitt Peak	Spacewatch	L5	9.9 km	MPC · JPL
739954	2019 MS_{11}	—	June 28, 2019	Haleakala	Pan-STARRS 1	·	1.5 km	MPC · JPL
739955	2019 MX_{11}	—	June 28, 2019	Haleakala	Pan-STARRS 1	HOF	2.2 km	MPC · JPL
739956	2019 ML_{18}	—	June 30, 2019	Haleakala	Pan-STARRS 1	·	1.2 km	MPC · JPL
739957	2019 MR_{18}	—	June 30, 2019	Haleakala	Pan-STARRS 2	·	1.7 km	MPC · JPL
739958	2019 MY_{18}	—	June 28, 2019	Haleakala	Pan-STARRS 1	·	1.5 km	MPC · JPL
739959	2019 MN_{28}	—	September 24, 2015	Mount Lemmon	Mount Lemmon Survey	·	1.4 km	MPC · JPL
739960	2019 NX	—	January 26, 2006	Kitt Peak	Spacewatch	L5	9.4 km	MPC · JPL
739961	2019 NN_{27}	—	January 25, 2010	WISE	WISE	·	1.4 km	MPC · JPL
739962	2019 NK_{30}	—	March 20, 1999	Apache Point	SDSS Collaboration	·	1.7 km	MPC · JPL
739963	2019 NL_{35}	—	July 4, 2019	Haleakala	Pan-STARRS 1	HOF	2.2 km	MPC · JPL
739964	2019 NG_{37}	—	July 4, 2019	Haleakala	Pan-STARRS 1	·	2.7 km	MPC · JPL
739965	2019 NG_{38}	—	July 7, 2019	Haleakala	Pan-STARRS 1	·	1.8 km	MPC · JPL
739966	2019 NP_{38}	—	July 5, 2019	Mount Lemmon	Mount Lemmon Survey	GEF	1.1 km	MPC · JPL
739967	2019 NN_{51}	—	June 29, 2019	Haleakala	Pan-STARRS 1	·	1.3 km	MPC · JPL
739968	2019 NZ_{58}	—	July 2, 2019	Haleakala	Pan-STARRS 1	L4	6.9 km	MPC · JPL
739969	2019 NP_{64}	—	July 6, 2019	Cerro Tololo-DECam	DECam	HOF	2.1 km	MPC · JPL
739970	2019 NQ_{64}	—	July 28, 2015	Haleakala	Pan-STARRS 1	·	1.5 km	MPC · JPL
739971	2019 NE_{78}	—	September 11, 2015	Haleakala	Pan-STARRS 1	HOF	2.1 km	MPC · JPL
739972	2019 NJ_{78}	—	July 2, 2019	Haleakala	Pan-STARRS 1	·	1.6 km	MPC · JPL
739973	2019 NL_{80}	—	July 6, 2019	Haleakala	Pan-STARRS 1	·	1.4 km	MPC · JPL
739974	2019 NK_{82}	—	July 27, 2014	Haleakala	Pan-STARRS 1	·	1.4 km	MPC · JPL
739975	2019 NZ_{82}	—	July 7, 2019	Haleakala	Pan-STARRS 1	·	1.6 km	MPC · JPL
739976	2019 NQ_{86}	—	March 21, 2015	Haleakala	Pan-STARRS 1	·	550 m	MPC · JPL
739977	2019 OE_{3}	—	September 26, 2000	Apache Point	SDSS Collaboration	L5	9.1 km	MPC · JPL
739978	2019 OK_{4}	—	July 4, 2005	Palomar	NEAT	·	2.3 km	MPC · JPL
739979	2019 OW_{8}	—	September 1, 2002	Palomar	NEAT	·	2.3 km	MPC · JPL
739980	2019 OA_{9}	—	February 28, 2008	Mount Lemmon	Mount Lemmon Survey	·	1.7 km	MPC · JPL
739981	2019 OY_{12}	—	March 13, 2010	WISE	WISE	·	3.8 km	MPC · JPL
739982	2019 OM_{15}	—	August 29, 2005	Palomar	NEAT	·	2.1 km	MPC · JPL
739983	2019 OZ_{15}	—	November 19, 2003	Kitt Peak	Spacewatch	·	4.4 km	MPC · JPL
739984	2019 OF_{18}	—	November 17, 2006	Kitt Peak	Spacewatch	·	1.9 km	MPC · JPL
739985	2019 OP_{28}	—	July 28, 2019	Haleakala	Pan-STARRS 1	L4	7.8 km	MPC · JPL
739986	2019 OA_{39}	—	July 28, 2019	Haleakala	Pan-STARRS 1	L4	6.8 km	MPC · JPL
739987	2019 PJ_{7}	—	August 8, 2019	Haleakala	Pan-STARRS 2	KOR	920 m	MPC · JPL
739988	2019 PP_{7}	—	September 14, 2014	Mount Lemmon	Mount Lemmon Survey	·	1.9 km	MPC · JPL
739989	2019 PJ_{13}	—	January 16, 2010	WISE	WISE	·	2.4 km	MPC · JPL
739990	2019 PA_{20}	—	November 20, 2009	Mount Lemmon	Mount Lemmon Survey	·	690 m	MPC · JPL
739991	2019 PQ_{28}	—	October 29, 2005	Kitt Peak	Spacewatch	·	980 m	MPC · JPL
739992	2019 PS_{28}	—	April 10, 2013	Haleakala	Pan-STARRS 1	·	1.1 km	MPC · JPL
739993	2019 PR_{65}	—	August 9, 2019	Haleakala	Pan-STARRS 1	·	1.4 km	MPC · JPL
739994	2019 QK_{10}	—	February 13, 2008	Kitt Peak	Spacewatch	·	1.4 km	MPC · JPL
739995	2019 QS_{10}	—	October 20, 2007	Kitt Peak	Spacewatch	(5)	700 m	MPC · JPL
739996	2019 QM_{20}	—	November 1, 2015	Mount Lemmon	Mount Lemmon Survey	ADE	1.8 km	MPC · JPL
739997	2019 RD_{17}	—	November 10, 1999	Kitt Peak	Spacewatch	·	620 m	MPC · JPL
739998	2019 RG_{28}	—	September 4, 2019	Mount Lemmon	Mount Lemmon Survey	·	1.5 km	MPC · JPL
739999	2019 RM_{28}	—	September 6, 2019	Haleakala	Pan-STARRS 1	·	1.9 km	MPC · JPL
740000	2019 RR_{28}	—	September 5, 2019	Mount Lemmon	Mount Lemmon Survey	·	1.5 km	MPC · JPL

back to top

== Meaning of names ==
As minor planet discoveries are confirmed, they are given a permanent number by the IAU's Minor Planet Center (MPC), and the discoverers can then submit names for them, following the IAU's naming conventions. The list below concerns those minor planets in the specified number-range that have received names, and explains the meanings of those names.

Official naming citations of newly named small Solar System bodies are approved and published in a bulletin by IAU's Working Group for Small Bodies Nomenclature (WGSBN). Before May 2021, citations were published in MPC's Minor Planet Circulars for many decades. Recent citations can also be found on the JPL Small-Body Database (SBDB). Until his death in 2016, German astronomer Lutz D. Schmadel compiled these citations into the Dictionary of Minor Planet Names (DMP) and regularly updated the collection.

Based on Paul Herget's The Names of the Minor Planets, Schmadel also researched the unclear origin of numerous asteroids, most of which had been named prior to World War II. This article incorporates text from this source, which is in the public domain: SBDB New namings may only be added to this list below after official publication as the preannouncement of names is condemned. The WGSBN publishes a comprehensive guideline for the naming rules of non-cometary small Solar System bodies.

Named minor planet	Provisional	This minor planet was named for...	Ref · Catalog
739634 Zhaojingyuan	2018 DW_{6}	Zhao Jingyuan, Chinese amateur astronomer.	IAU · 739634
