= List of minor planets: 461001–462000 =

The following is a partial list of minor planets, running from minor-planet number 461001 through 462000, inclusive. The primary data for this and other partial lists is based on JPL's "Small-Body Orbital Elements" and data available from the Minor Planet Center. Critical list information is also provided by the MPC, unless otherwise specified from Lowell Observatory. A detailed description of the table's columns and additional sources are given on the main page including a complete list of every page in this series, and a statistical break-up on the dynamical classification of minor planets.

Also see the summary list of all named bodies in numerical and alphabetical order, and the corresponding naming citations for the number range of this particular list. New namings may only be added to this list after official publication, as the preannouncement of names is condemned by the Working Group for Small Bodies Nomenclature of the International Astronomical Union.

Near-Earth obj.	MBA (inner)	MBA (outer)	Centaur
Mars-crosser	MBA (middle)	Jupiter trojan	Trans-Neptunian obj.
Unclassified

== 461001–461100 ==
Designation			Discovery			Properties		Ref
Permanent	Provisional	Named after	Date	Site	Discoverer(s)	Category	Diam.	Ref
461001	2014 WN_{361}	—	October 3, 2006	Mount Lemmon	Mount Lemmon Survey	·	2.7 km	MPC · JPL
461002	2014 WZ_{361}	—	March 2, 2005	Socorro	LINEAR	PHO	1.5 km	MPC · JPL
461003	2014 WG_{367}	—	February 11, 2004	Kitt Peak	Spacewatch	T_{j} (2.98)	4.5 km	MPC · JPL
461004	2014 WZ_{372}	—	March 10, 2011	Kitt Peak	Spacewatch	·	3.0 km	MPC · JPL
461005	2014 WE_{377}	—	October 24, 2008	Kitt Peak	Spacewatch	VER	2.5 km	MPC · JPL
461006	2014 WE_{382}	—	January 8, 2010	Mount Lemmon	Mount Lemmon Survey	LIX	3.3 km	MPC · JPL
461007	2014 WH_{382}	—	February 9, 2005	Kitt Peak	Spacewatch	·	1.4 km	MPC · JPL
461008	2014 WM_{382}	—	September 21, 2009	Kitt Peak	Spacewatch	·	1.5 km	MPC · JPL
461009	2014 WT_{385}	—	May 22, 2006	Kitt Peak	Spacewatch	HYG	2.6 km	MPC · JPL
461010	2014 WF_{387}	—	February 27, 2006	Kitt Peak	Spacewatch	·	3.6 km	MPC · JPL
461011	2014 WM_{388}	—	February 10, 2008	Kitt Peak	Spacewatch	·	1.7 km	MPC · JPL
461012	2014 WR_{388}	—	November 17, 2009	Mount Lemmon	Mount Lemmon Survey	·	3.3 km	MPC · JPL
461013	2014 WV_{388}	—	August 25, 2008	Siding Spring	SSS	T_{j} (2.94)	4.1 km	MPC · JPL
461014	2014 WR_{392}	—	January 10, 2002	Campo Imperatore	CINEOS	ADE	2.1 km	MPC · JPL
461015	2014 WP_{396}	—	January 30, 2006	Kitt Peak	Spacewatch	·	2.3 km	MPC · JPL
461016	2014 WS_{398}	—	July 29, 2008	Kitt Peak	Spacewatch	·	3.3 km	MPC · JPL
461017	2014 WC_{399}	—	June 8, 2007	Kitt Peak	Spacewatch	·	3.8 km	MPC · JPL
461018	2014 WP_{401}	—	October 19, 2007	Kitt Peak	Spacewatch	CYB	4.0 km	MPC · JPL
461019	2014 WW_{401}	—	January 22, 2006	Mount Lemmon	Mount Lemmon Survey	KOR	1.2 km	MPC · JPL
461020	2014 WE_{406}	—	December 28, 2005	Mount Lemmon	Mount Lemmon Survey	·	1.8 km	MPC · JPL
461021	2014 WQ_{407}	—	October 7, 2008	Kitt Peak	Spacewatch	·	3.1 km	MPC · JPL
461022	2014 WO_{421}	—	January 15, 2005	Kitt Peak	Spacewatch	·	2.9 km	MPC · JPL
461023	2014 WU_{429}	—	December 18, 2009	Mount Lemmon	Mount Lemmon Survey	·	2.5 km	MPC · JPL
461024	2014 WV_{430}	—	December 1, 2003	Kitt Peak	Spacewatch	·	3.1 km	MPC · JPL
461025	2014 WJ_{432}	—	October 28, 2008	Kitt Peak	Spacewatch	·	3.5 km	MPC · JPL
461026	2014 WY_{444}	—	December 18, 2003	Socorro	LINEAR	·	3.2 km	MPC · JPL
461027	2014 WS_{445}	—	October 12, 1998	Kitt Peak	Spacewatch	·	1.8 km	MPC · JPL
461028	2014 WA_{457}	—	November 25, 2005	Kitt Peak	Spacewatch	PAD	1.5 km	MPC · JPL
461029	2014 WK_{463}	—	October 6, 2008	Mount Lemmon	Mount Lemmon Survey	·	2.9 km	MPC · JPL
461030	2014 WN_{475}	—	May 22, 2006	Kitt Peak	Spacewatch	·	4.2 km	MPC · JPL
461031	2014 WR_{475}	—	May 3, 2006	Kitt Peak	Spacewatch	·	4.6 km	MPC · JPL
461032	2014 WM_{482}	—	October 29, 2005	Catalina	CSS	·	1.9 km	MPC · JPL
461033	2014 WW_{489}	—	April 10, 2002	Socorro	LINEAR	·	2.2 km	MPC · JPL
461034	2014 WU_{490}	—	November 30, 1995	Kitt Peak	Spacewatch	BRA	1.5 km	MPC · JPL
461035	2014 WW_{490}	—	December 27, 2006	Mount Lemmon	Mount Lemmon Survey	·	1.6 km	MPC · JPL
461036	2014 WB_{491}	—	March 26, 2006	Kitt Peak	Spacewatch	·	2.9 km	MPC · JPL
461037	2014 WD_{493}	—	October 9, 2007	Mount Lemmon	Mount Lemmon Survey	·	3.9 km	MPC · JPL
461038	2014 WB_{499}	—	November 19, 1998	Kitt Peak	Spacewatch	·	4.4 km	MPC · JPL
461039	2014 WX_{499}	—	November 8, 2009	Catalina	CSS	·	2.1 km	MPC · JPL
461040	2014 WT_{501}	—	February 13, 2010	Socorro	LINEAR	·	2.5 km	MPC · JPL
461041	2014 WC_{503}	—	December 4, 2005	Kitt Peak	Spacewatch	HOF	2.9 km	MPC · JPL
461042	2014 WE_{503}	—	August 31, 2000	Socorro	LINEAR	·	2.0 km	MPC · JPL
461043	2014 WL_{503}	—	October 9, 2008	Catalina	CSS	·	3.4 km	MPC · JPL
461044	2014 WT_{504}	—	September 26, 2009	Kitt Peak	Spacewatch	·	3.0 km	MPC · JPL
461045	2014 XO_{8}	—	October 1, 2003	Anderson Mesa	LONEOS	·	3.9 km	MPC · JPL
461046	2014 XZ_{12}	—	November 20, 2001	Socorro	LINEAR	·	1.8 km	MPC · JPL
461047	2014 XC_{15}	—	December 16, 2004	Kitt Peak	Spacewatch	·	1.5 km	MPC · JPL
461048	2014 XA_{17}	—	October 26, 2003	Kitt Peak	Spacewatch	·	3.5 km	MPC · JPL
461049	2014 XF_{17}	—	September 29, 2008	Mount Lemmon	Mount Lemmon Survey	EOS	1.9 km	MPC · JPL
461050	2014 XN_{17}	—	May 1, 2012	Mount Lemmon	Mount Lemmon Survey	·	2.8 km	MPC · JPL
461051	2014 XG_{18}	—	June 10, 2007	Kitt Peak	Spacewatch	·	2.2 km	MPC · JPL
461052	2014 XG_{19}	—	October 23, 2009	Kitt Peak	Spacewatch	·	3.0 km	MPC · JPL
461053	2014 XQ_{25}	—	September 30, 2003	Kitt Peak	Spacewatch	·	2.4 km	MPC · JPL
461054	2014 XR_{25}	—	December 28, 2005	Kitt Peak	Spacewatch	·	2.2 km	MPC · JPL
461055	2014 XP_{26}	—	December 29, 1997	Kitt Peak	Spacewatch	·	4.8 km	MPC · JPL
461056	2014 XF_{28}	—	January 5, 2006	Catalina	CSS	HOF	3.4 km	MPC · JPL
461057	2014 XS_{38}	—	November 26, 2003	Kitt Peak	Spacewatch	EOS	1.8 km	MPC · JPL
461058	2014 YQ_{5}	—	November 14, 1996	Kitt Peak	Spacewatch	·	4.0 km	MPC · JPL
461059	2014 YC_{11}	—	February 11, 2011	Mount Lemmon	Mount Lemmon Survey	AGN	1.2 km	MPC · JPL
461060	2014 YF_{11}	—	September 30, 2008	Catalina	CSS	EOS	2.0 km	MPC · JPL
461061	2014 YE_{13}	—	October 1, 2009	Mount Lemmon	Mount Lemmon Survey	·	2.0 km	MPC · JPL
461062	2014 YG_{17}	—	October 8, 2005	Anderson Mesa	LONEOS	·	2.0 km	MPC · JPL
461063	2014 YP_{19}	—	November 19, 2009	Kitt Peak	Spacewatch	·	2.8 km	MPC · JPL
461064	2014 YW_{20}	—	July 3, 1995	Kitt Peak	Spacewatch	·	1.8 km	MPC · JPL
461065	2014 YR_{23}	—	October 28, 2008	Mount Lemmon	Mount Lemmon Survey	·	3.5 km	MPC · JPL
461066	2014 YS_{23}	—	March 29, 2010	WISE	WISE	·	4.6 km	MPC · JPL
461067	2014 YC_{26}	—	October 28, 2005	Mount Lemmon	Mount Lemmon Survey	·	2.3 km	MPC · JPL
461068	2014 YW_{27}	—	April 11, 2005	Kitt Peak	Spacewatch	HYG	2.8 km	MPC · JPL
461069	2014 YK_{29}	—	November 18, 2008	Kitt Peak	Spacewatch	·	3.1 km	MPC · JPL
461070	2014 YT_{37}	—	April 11, 2007	Kitt Peak	Spacewatch	·	2.5 km	MPC · JPL
461071	2014 YT_{42}	—	February 1, 2005	Kitt Peak	Spacewatch	EOS	2.2 km	MPC · JPL
461072	2014 YR_{44}	—	December 27, 2005	Mount Lemmon	Mount Lemmon Survey	GEF	1.6 km	MPC · JPL
461073	2015 AX	—	April 6, 2011	Mount Lemmon	Mount Lemmon Survey	·	3.2 km	MPC · JPL
461074	2015 AU_{3}	—	January 22, 1993	Kitt Peak	Spacewatch	·	2.5 km	MPC · JPL
461075	2015 AA_{4}	—	January 4, 2010	Kitt Peak	Spacewatch	·	2.7 km	MPC · JPL
461076	2015 AN_{10}	—	September 18, 2007	Kitt Peak	Spacewatch	·	3.6 km	MPC · JPL
461077	2015 AM_{11}	—	September 13, 2007	Mount Lemmon	Mount Lemmon Survey	·	3.2 km	MPC · JPL
461078	2015 AZ_{26}	—	December 3, 2008	Mount Lemmon	Mount Lemmon Survey	·	2.6 km	MPC · JPL
461079	2015 AE_{33}	—	February 12, 2004	Kitt Peak	Spacewatch	·	3.1 km	MPC · JPL
461080	2015 AW_{34}	—	May 9, 2006	Mount Lemmon	Mount Lemmon Survey	·	3.1 km	MPC · JPL
461081	2015 AJ_{49}	—	January 4, 2010	Kitt Peak	Spacewatch	·	3.3 km	MPC · JPL
461082	2015 AJ_{86}	—	July 21, 2003	Campo Imperatore	CINEOS	·	3.7 km	MPC · JPL
461083	2015 AX_{91}	—	August 10, 2012	Kitt Peak	Spacewatch	·	3.0 km	MPC · JPL
461084	2015 AX_{130}	—	February 2, 2006	Mount Lemmon	Mount Lemmon Survey	KOR	1.9 km	MPC · JPL
461085	2015 AK_{145}	—	April 6, 2005	Kitt Peak	Spacewatch	·	2.3 km	MPC · JPL
461086	2015 AU_{175}	—	May 7, 2011	Kitt Peak	Spacewatch	EOS	1.8 km	MPC · JPL
461087	2015 AA_{185}	—	January 19, 2004	Kitt Peak	Spacewatch	·	3.1 km	MPC · JPL
461088	2015 AW_{198}	—	March 20, 2007	Kitt Peak	Spacewatch	HOF	3.5 km	MPC · JPL
461089	2015 AL_{214}	—	December 26, 2006	Kitt Peak	Spacewatch	·	4.6 km	MPC · JPL
461090	2015 AE_{257}	—	December 25, 2005	Kitt Peak	Spacewatch	·	2.4 km	MPC · JPL
461091	2015 AP_{273}	—	April 19, 2010	WISE	WISE	·	3.9 km	MPC · JPL
461092	2015 BR_{5}	—	December 9, 2004	Catalina	CSS	·	2.7 km	MPC · JPL
461093	2015 BJ_{37}	—	December 10, 2004	Socorro	LINEAR	·	3.2 km	MPC · JPL
461094	2015 BX_{38}	—	March 15, 2004	Kitt Peak	Spacewatch	CYB	3.8 km	MPC · JPL
461095	2015 BY_{56}	—	March 3, 2005	Catalina	CSS	·	3.4 km	MPC · JPL
461096	2015 BH_{62}	—	May 16, 2010	WISE	WISE	·	3.3 km	MPC · JPL
461097	2015 BU_{74}	—	February 16, 2010	Kitt Peak	Spacewatch	EOS	2.5 km	MPC · JPL
461098	2015 BP_{75}	—	January 15, 2004	Kitt Peak	Spacewatch	·	2.9 km	MPC · JPL
461099	2015 BR_{97}	—	June 12, 2004	Siding Spring	SSS	·	1.9 km	MPC · JPL
461100	2015 BA_{108}	—	October 14, 2009	Mount Lemmon	Mount Lemmon Survey	AGN	1.4 km	MPC · JPL

== 461101–461200 ==
back to top

Designation			Discovery			Properties		Ref
Permanent	Provisional	Named after	Date	Site	Discoverer(s)	Category	Diam.	Ref
461101	2015 BF_{114}	—	May 5, 2010	WISE	WISE	·	4.2 km	MPC · JPL
461102	2015 BU_{206}	—	September 16, 2009	Catalina	CSS	·	2.3 km	MPC · JPL
461103	2015 BJ_{207}	—	January 22, 2004	Socorro	LINEAR	·	2.0 km	MPC · JPL
461104	2015 BH_{214}	—	May 9, 2010	WISE	WISE	·	4.7 km	MPC · JPL
461105	2015 BJ_{218}	—	February 13, 2010	Mount Lemmon	Mount Lemmon Survey	·	3.3 km	MPC · JPL
461106	2015 BT_{218}	—	September 11, 2007	Kitt Peak	Spacewatch	·	4.0 km	MPC · JPL
461107	2015 BU_{222}	—	November 17, 2007	Kitt Peak	Spacewatch	CYB	4.7 km	MPC · JPL
461108	2015 BO_{227}	—	February 13, 2010	Catalina	CSS	·	3.6 km	MPC · JPL
461109	2015 BF_{368}	—	September 26, 1995	Kitt Peak	Spacewatch	·	3.2 km	MPC · JPL
461110	2015 BX_{413}	—	March 13, 2010	Kitt Peak	Spacewatch	·	3.1 km	MPC · JPL
461111	2015 BZ_{516}	—	February 22, 2006	Anderson Mesa	LONEOS	·	2.9 km	MPC · JPL
461112	2015 CO_{8}	—	February 15, 2010	Kitt Peak	Spacewatch	·	2.9 km	MPC · JPL
461113	2015 CR_{35}	—	April 5, 2000	Kitt Peak	Spacewatch	EOS	2.2 km	MPC · JPL
461114	2015 CG_{36}	—	February 15, 2004	Socorro	LINEAR	VER	3.5 km	MPC · JPL
461115	2015 DG_{22}	—	January 20, 1996	Kitt Peak	Spacewatch	GEF	1.4 km	MPC · JPL
461116	2015 DL_{117}	—	October 3, 2013	Kitt Peak	Spacewatch	EOS	2.0 km	MPC · JPL
461117	2015 DD_{145}	—	February 3, 2009	Mount Lemmon	Mount Lemmon Survey	CYB	4.9 km	MPC · JPL
461118	2015 DR_{146}	—	December 21, 2003	Kitt Peak	Spacewatch	·	3.4 km	MPC · JPL
461119	2015 DX_{147}	—	August 26, 2001	Kitt Peak	Spacewatch	·	3.0 km	MPC · JPL
461120	2015 DE_{177}	—	May 3, 1994	Kitt Peak	Spacewatch	·	4.1 km	MPC · JPL
461121	2015 DC_{178}	—	February 10, 2002	Socorro	LINEAR	·	1.3 km	MPC · JPL
461122	2015 FY	—	February 9, 2010	Kitt Peak	Spacewatch	·	3.8 km	MPC · JPL
461123	2015 OL_{22}	—	August 3, 2010	WISE	WISE	·	2.2 km	MPC · JPL
461124	2015 RX_{73}	—	September 13, 2007	Mount Lemmon	Mount Lemmon Survey	·	600 m	MPC · JPL
461125	2015 RC_{83}	—	November 2, 2007	Mount Lemmon	Mount Lemmon Survey	·	3.0 km	MPC · JPL
461126	2015 RH_{116}	—	January 13, 1996	Kitt Peak	Spacewatch	·	2.5 km	MPC · JPL
461127	2015 RD_{151}	—	October 11, 2007	Mount Lemmon	Mount Lemmon Survey	·	1.1 km	MPC · JPL
461128	2015 RX_{196}	—	October 21, 2006	Mount Lemmon	Mount Lemmon Survey	·	1.9 km	MPC · JPL
461129	2015 RK_{234}	—	February 1, 2012	Kitt Peak	Spacewatch	EOS	2.1 km	MPC · JPL
461130	2015 RJ_{235}	—	January 5, 2006	Kitt Peak	Spacewatch	·	3.0 km	MPC · JPL
461131	2015 TS_{2}	—	September 24, 2008	Kitt Peak	Spacewatch	·	1.0 km	MPC · JPL
461132	2015 TL_{77}	—	June 29, 2010	WISE	WISE	·	2.6 km	MPC · JPL
461133	2015 TZ_{82}	—	September 26, 2005	Kitt Peak	Spacewatch	·	2.1 km	MPC · JPL
461134	2015 TO_{86}	—	October 2, 2006	Mount Lemmon	Mount Lemmon Survey	·	1.2 km	MPC · JPL
461135	2015 TU_{88}	—	April 18, 2007	Mount Lemmon	Mount Lemmon Survey	·	1.0 km	MPC · JPL
461136	2015 TC_{102}	—	May 11, 2007	Mount Lemmon	Mount Lemmon Survey	·	3.6 km	MPC · JPL
461137	2015 TH_{102}	—	December 7, 2004	Socorro	LINEAR	·	2.9 km	MPC · JPL
461138	2015 TU_{103}	—	June 5, 2013	Mount Lemmon	Mount Lemmon Survey	·	3.0 km	MPC · JPL
461139	2015 TH_{105}	—	September 12, 2007	Catalina	CSS	·	1.4 km	MPC · JPL
461140	2015 TV_{105}	—	September 22, 2009	Mount Lemmon	Mount Lemmon Survey	·	4.2 km	MPC · JPL
461141	2015 TD_{106}	—	May 15, 1996	Kitt Peak	Spacewatch	·	2.7 km	MPC · JPL
461142	2015 TG_{106}	—	May 14, 2004	Kitt Peak	Spacewatch	·	740 m	MPC · JPL
461143	2015 TH_{109}	—	January 20, 2009	Kitt Peak	Spacewatch	·	1.1 km	MPC · JPL
461144	2015 TU_{110}	—	September 30, 2003	Kitt Peak	Spacewatch	·	2.7 km	MPC · JPL
461145	2015 TA_{111}	—	April 12, 2002	Kitt Peak	Spacewatch	EOS	2.2 km	MPC · JPL
461146	2015 TC_{111}	—	October 27, 2005	Catalina	CSS	·	2.0 km	MPC · JPL
461147	2015 TS_{111}	—	January 8, 2000	Kitt Peak	Spacewatch	·	860 m	MPC · JPL
461148	2015 TD_{112}	—	January 23, 2006	Mount Lemmon	Mount Lemmon Survey	V	570 m	MPC · JPL
461149	2015 TO_{112}	—	November 20, 2008	Kitt Peak	Spacewatch	PHO	2.1 km	MPC · JPL
461150	2015 TN_{114}	—	March 16, 2007	Mount Lemmon	Mount Lemmon Survey	·	2.2 km	MPC · JPL
461151	2015 TT_{114}	—	December 6, 2010	Mount Lemmon	Mount Lemmon Survey	·	2.5 km	MPC · JPL
461152	2015 TY_{114}	—	September 2, 2008	Kitt Peak	Spacewatch	CYB	2.9 km	MPC · JPL
461153	2015 TC_{115}	—	March 11, 2007	Mount Lemmon	Mount Lemmon Survey	·	660 m	MPC · JPL
461154	2015 TS_{115}	—	March 10, 2000	Kitt Peak	Spacewatch	·	1.2 km	MPC · JPL
461155	2015 TH_{116}	—	February 27, 2009	Mount Lemmon	Mount Lemmon Survey	PHO	820 m	MPC · JPL
461156	2015 TS_{116}	—	January 10, 2008	Kitt Peak	Spacewatch	·	1.3 km	MPC · JPL
461157	2015 TD_{117}	—	January 29, 2011	Mount Lemmon	Mount Lemmon Survey	·	2.5 km	MPC · JPL
461158	2015 TE_{117}	—	April 2, 2006	Kitt Peak	Spacewatch	·	4.9 km	MPC · JPL
461159	2015 TW_{119}	—	February 6, 2011	Kitt Peak	Spacewatch	·	2.7 km	MPC · JPL
461160	2015 TB_{120}	—	January 5, 2002	Kitt Peak	Spacewatch	·	2.2 km	MPC · JPL
461161	2015 TD_{126}	—	April 11, 2008	Kitt Peak	Spacewatch	·	2.9 km	MPC · JPL
461162	2015 TO_{138}	—	April 4, 2008	Mount Lemmon	Mount Lemmon Survey	·	1.9 km	MPC · JPL
461163	2015 TY_{142}	—	October 27, 2005	Catalina	CSS	·	2.3 km	MPC · JPL
461164	2015 TZ_{146}	—	February 27, 2006	Kitt Peak	Spacewatch	·	1.3 km	MPC · JPL
461165	2015 TY_{179}	—	January 28, 2006	Mount Lemmon	Mount Lemmon Survey	·	2.0 km	MPC · JPL
461166	2015 TY_{183}	—	July 28, 2009	Kitt Peak	Spacewatch	·	1.6 km	MPC · JPL
461167	2015 TF_{184}	—	December 10, 2010	Kitt Peak	Spacewatch	·	3.4 km	MPC · JPL
461168	2015 TH_{224}	—	December 2, 2004	Kitt Peak	Spacewatch	·	1.9 km	MPC · JPL
461169	2015 TK_{224}	—	August 23, 2004	Kitt Peak	Spacewatch	·	970 m	MPC · JPL
461170	2015 TX_{232}	—	January 23, 2006	Catalina	CSS	·	2.9 km	MPC · JPL
461171	2015 TY_{304}	—	December 21, 2005	Kitt Peak	Spacewatch	·	2.5 km	MPC · JPL
461172	2015 TE_{321}	—	January 17, 2004	Kitt Peak	Spacewatch	·	900 m	MPC · JPL
461173	2015 UQ_{11}	—	September 15, 2006	Kitt Peak	Spacewatch	·	1.3 km	MPC · JPL
461174	2015 UZ_{46}	—	September 29, 2003	Kitt Peak	Spacewatch	·	5.3 km	MPC · JPL
461175	2015 US_{48}	—	January 16, 2010	WISE	WISE	·	3.1 km	MPC · JPL
461176	2015 UJ_{66}	—	April 25, 2007	Mount Lemmon	Mount Lemmon Survey	·	3.7 km	MPC · JPL
461177	2015 UW_{77}	—	October 10, 2004	Kitt Peak	Spacewatch	·	1.1 km	MPC · JPL
461178	2015 UH_{79}	—	February 14, 2008	Catalina	CSS	·	1.6 km	MPC · JPL
461179	2015 VE_{4}	—	December 14, 2004	Campo Imperatore	CINEOS	·	3.4 km	MPC · JPL
461180	2015 VA_{42}	—	March 11, 2008	Mount Lemmon	Mount Lemmon Survey	·	1.4 km	MPC · JPL
461181	2015 VG_{42}	—	January 22, 2006	Anderson Mesa	LONEOS	EOS	2.7 km	MPC · JPL
461182	2015 VB_{63}	—	August 28, 2009	Kitt Peak	Spacewatch	·	2.2 km	MPC · JPL
461183	2015 VO_{63}	—	December 3, 2004	Kitt Peak	Spacewatch	·	4.5 km	MPC · JPL
461184	2015 VS_{65}	—	September 15, 2007	Mount Lemmon	Mount Lemmon Survey	·	1.4 km	MPC · JPL
461185	2015 VH_{72}	—	April 30, 2009	Kitt Peak	Spacewatch	·	1.8 km	MPC · JPL
461186	2015 VL_{72}	—	April 1, 2012	Mount Lemmon	Mount Lemmon Survey	EOS	1.7 km	MPC · JPL
461187	2015 VE_{78}	—	November 3, 2008	Mount Lemmon	Mount Lemmon Survey	·	750 m	MPC · JPL
461188	2015 VZ_{95}	—	September 25, 2000	Socorro	LINEAR	·	1.1 km	MPC · JPL
461189	2015 VG_{97}	—	April 20, 2004	Kitt Peak	Spacewatch	·	2.0 km	MPC · JPL
461190	2015 VH_{97}	—	September 19, 2009	Kitt Peak	Spacewatch	·	2.9 km	MPC · JPL
461191	2015 VY_{98}	—	December 4, 2007	Kitt Peak	Spacewatch	·	960 m	MPC · JPL
461192	2015 VA_{99}	—	October 21, 2003	Kitt Peak	Spacewatch	·	4.2 km	MPC · JPL
461193	2015 VK_{100}	—	December 26, 2005	Kitt Peak	Spacewatch	·	1.9 km	MPC · JPL
461194	2015 VO_{101}	—	December 6, 2005	Kitt Peak	Spacewatch	·	1.9 km	MPC · JPL
461195	2015 VV_{102}	—	April 7, 2008	Kitt Peak	Spacewatch	·	2.2 km	MPC · JPL
461196	2015 VR_{103}	—	September 18, 2009	Mount Lemmon	Mount Lemmon Survey	·	1.9 km	MPC · JPL
461197	2015 VU_{106}	—	February 25, 2006	Kitt Peak	Spacewatch	·	1.3 km	MPC · JPL
461198	2015 VW_{112}	—	October 2, 2006	Mount Lemmon	Mount Lemmon Survey	MIS	2.5 km	MPC · JPL
461199	2015 VF_{113}	—	May 2, 2008	Kitt Peak	Spacewatch	EOS	2.3 km	MPC · JPL
461200	2015 VP_{113}	—	February 6, 2008	Catalina	CSS	·	1.7 km	MPC · JPL

== 461201–461300 ==
back to top

Designation			Discovery			Properties		Ref
Permanent	Provisional	Named after	Date	Site	Discoverer(s)	Category	Diam.	Ref
461201	2015 VN_{116}	—	February 28, 2008	Mount Lemmon	Mount Lemmon Survey	AGN	1.4 km	MPC · JPL
461202	2015 VA_{118}	—	November 20, 2008	Kitt Peak	Spacewatch	·	1.8 km	MPC · JPL
461203	2015 VW_{118}	—	December 1, 1994	Kitt Peak	Spacewatch	·	560 m	MPC · JPL
461204	2015 VO_{120}	—	November 17, 2011	Kitt Peak	Spacewatch	(5)	990 m	MPC · JPL
461205	2015 VW_{120}	—	December 31, 1999	Kitt Peak	Spacewatch	·	2.4 km	MPC · JPL
461206	2015 VG_{121}	—	January 5, 2006	Kitt Peak	Spacewatch	EOS	2.0 km	MPC · JPL
461207	2015 VH_{123}	—	October 12, 2004	Kitt Peak	Spacewatch	·	900 m	MPC · JPL
461208	2015 VM_{125}	—	November 7, 2002	Socorro	LINEAR	·	1.5 km	MPC · JPL
461209	2015 VV_{126}	—	October 23, 2004	Kitt Peak	Spacewatch	·	3.9 km	MPC · JPL
461210	2015 VX_{127}	—	November 4, 2004	Kitt Peak	Spacewatch	·	1.5 km	MPC · JPL
461211	2015 VK_{128}	—	October 10, 2004	Socorro	LINEAR	EOS	2.3 km	MPC · JPL
461212	2015 VD_{129}	—	November 5, 2010	Kitt Peak	Spacewatch	·	1.8 km	MPC · JPL
461213	2015 VY_{129}	—	May 9, 2007	Anderson Mesa	LONEOS	·	3.2 km	MPC · JPL
461214	2015 VE_{130}	—	December 19, 2004	Mount Lemmon	Mount Lemmon Survey	·	3.3 km	MPC · JPL
461215	2015 VB_{133}	—	April 13, 2013	Kitt Peak	Spacewatch	·	3.1 km	MPC · JPL
461216	2015 VF_{134}	—	October 17, 2006	Mount Lemmon	Mount Lemmon Survey	·	1.7 km	MPC · JPL
461217	2015 VT_{134}	—	June 6, 2005	Kitt Peak	Spacewatch	·	2.0 km	MPC · JPL
461218	2015 VN_{135}	—	December 8, 2004	Socorro	LINEAR	·	2.9 km	MPC · JPL
461219	2015 VP_{135}	—	January 18, 2009	Mount Lemmon	Mount Lemmon Survey	·	1.1 km	MPC · JPL
461220	2015 VU_{139}	—	January 20, 2002	Kitt Peak	Spacewatch	·	1.4 km	MPC · JPL
461221	2015 VC_{140}	—	September 18, 2009	Kitt Peak	Spacewatch	·	3.5 km	MPC · JPL
461222	2015 VN_{141}	—	October 8, 2007	Mount Lemmon	Mount Lemmon Survey	3:2	3.7 km	MPC · JPL
461223	2015 VV_{143}	—	October 6, 2008	Mount Lemmon	Mount Lemmon Survey	PHO	1.4 km	MPC · JPL
461224	2015 VO_{144}	—	September 28, 2003	Anderson Mesa	LONEOS	TIR	4.0 km	MPC · JPL
461225	2015 VP_{144}	—	September 20, 2006	Kitt Peak	Spacewatch	·	1.5 km	MPC · JPL
461226	2015 VM_{148}	—	January 19, 2004	Anderson Mesa	LONEOS	(5)	1.1 km	MPC · JPL
461227	2015 VJ_{150}	—	March 3, 2000	Socorro	LINEAR	·	3.9 km	MPC · JPL
461228	2015 WL_{2}	—	April 4, 2005	Mount Lemmon	Mount Lemmon Survey	·	1.4 km	MPC · JPL
461229	2015 WO_{3}	—	August 27, 2009	Catalina	CSS	·	2.4 km	MPC · JPL
461230	2015 WP_{3}	—	September 14, 2010	Kitt Peak	Spacewatch	·	2.2 km	MPC · JPL
461231	2015 WF_{4}	—	December 1, 2010	Mount Lemmon	Mount Lemmon Survey	·	2.8 km	MPC · JPL
461232	2015 WJ_{4}	—	January 27, 2010	WISE	WISE	·	3.1 km	MPC · JPL
461233	2015 WZ_{4}	—	May 10, 2007	Mount Lemmon	Mount Lemmon Survey	·	3.0 km	MPC · JPL
461234	2015 WE_{6}	—	March 29, 2009	Siding Spring	SSS	JUN	1.6 km	MPC · JPL
461235	2015 WJ_{6}	—	September 10, 2004	Kitt Peak	Spacewatch	·	1.7 km	MPC · JPL
461236	2015 WL_{6}	—	November 20, 2004	Kitt Peak	Spacewatch	·	3.0 km	MPC · JPL
461237	2015 WP_{6}	—	January 16, 2009	Kitt Peak	Spacewatch	NYS	1.1 km	MPC · JPL
461238	2015 WQ_{6}	—	January 26, 2004	Anderson Mesa	LONEOS	·	1.5 km	MPC · JPL
461239	2015 WC_{10}	—	December 11, 2004	Socorro	LINEAR	·	1.2 km	MPC · JPL
461240	2015 WW_{13}	—	August 31, 2005	Kitt Peak	Spacewatch	KOR	1.3 km	MPC · JPL
461241	2015 WG_{14}	—	December 19, 2004	Mount Lemmon	Mount Lemmon Survey	NYS	1.1 km	MPC · JPL
461242	2015 WL_{14}	—	November 20, 2009	Mount Lemmon	Mount Lemmon Survey	T_{j} (2.99)	3.3 km	MPC · JPL
461243	2015 WP_{14}	—	March 4, 2008	Mount Lemmon	Mount Lemmon Survey	·	1.4 km	MPC · JPL
461244	2015 WQ_{15}	—	November 9, 2001	Socorro	LINEAR	·	1.7 km	MPC · JPL
461245	2015 WU_{15}	—	December 5, 1997	Caussols	ODAS	·	1.5 km	MPC · JPL
461246	2015 WZ_{15}	—	December 21, 2004	Catalina	CSS	·	1.3 km	MPC · JPL
461247	2015 WJ_{16}	—	October 8, 2004	Socorro	LINEAR	·	1.3 km	MPC · JPL
461248	2015 XG_{2}	—	December 28, 2005	Kitt Peak	Spacewatch	·	1.6 km	MPC · JPL
461249	2015 XL_{2}	—	November 18, 2004	Campo Imperatore	CINEOS	MAS	710 m	MPC · JPL
461250	2015 XP_{2}	—	September 25, 2009	Catalina	CSS	EOS	2.3 km	MPC · JPL
461251	2015 XV_{5}	—	December 31, 2005	Kitt Peak	Spacewatch	·	2.4 km	MPC · JPL
461252	2015 XN_{6}	—	November 13, 2007	Mount Lemmon	Mount Lemmon Survey	·	1.3 km	MPC · JPL
461253	2015 XC_{7}	—	November 14, 1998	Kitt Peak	Spacewatch	VER	2.6 km	MPC · JPL
461254	2015 XF_{9}	—	April 18, 2007	Mount Lemmon	Mount Lemmon Survey	·	3.4 km	MPC · JPL
461255	2015 XK_{9}	—	September 30, 2009	Mount Lemmon	Mount Lemmon Survey	·	3.0 km	MPC · JPL
461256	2015 XR_{9}	—	November 7, 2010	Mount Lemmon	Mount Lemmon Survey	·	4.7 km	MPC · JPL
461257	2015 XM_{10}	—	December 6, 2005	Mount Lemmon	Mount Lemmon Survey	EOS	1.6 km	MPC · JPL
461258	2015 XC_{13}	—	November 8, 2010	Kitt Peak	Spacewatch	EOS	1.6 km	MPC · JPL
461259	2015 XZ_{29}	—	January 8, 2011	Mount Lemmon	Mount Lemmon Survey	·	3.4 km	MPC · JPL
461260	2015 XB_{42}	—	October 13, 2004	Kitt Peak	Spacewatch	·	2.1 km	MPC · JPL
461261	2015 XZ_{43}	—	September 16, 2009	Kitt Peak	Spacewatch	·	2.7 km	MPC · JPL
461262	2015 XY_{44}	—	April 12, 2002	Socorro	LINEAR	·	1.5 km	MPC · JPL
461263	2015 XY_{50}	—	April 13, 2013	Kitt Peak	Spacewatch	·	2.3 km	MPC · JPL
461264	2015 XM_{53}	—	December 5, 2010	Mount Lemmon	Mount Lemmon Survey	·	3.4 km	MPC · JPL
461265	2015 XS_{56}	—	September 18, 2003	Kitt Peak	Spacewatch	·	3.2 km	MPC · JPL
461266	2015 XD_{58}	—	March 5, 2008	Kitt Peak	Spacewatch	AGN	940 m	MPC · JPL
461267	2015 XG_{58}	—	March 6, 2008	Mount Lemmon	Mount Lemmon Survey	·	1.5 km	MPC · JPL
461268	2015 XC_{59}	—	March 4, 2008	Mount Lemmon	Mount Lemmon Survey	·	1.8 km	MPC · JPL
461269	2015 XU_{60}	—	September 29, 2009	Mount Lemmon	Mount Lemmon Survey	·	5.0 km	MPC · JPL
461270	2015 XX_{60}	—	January 7, 2006	Mount Lemmon	Mount Lemmon Survey	EOS	2.0 km	MPC · JPL
461271	2015 XF_{61}	—	September 1, 1997	Kleť	J. Tichá, M. Tichý	(2076)	930 m	MPC · JPL
461272	2015 XM_{62}	—	September 29, 2003	Kitt Peak	Spacewatch	·	3.0 km	MPC · JPL
461273	2015 XY_{62}	—	January 18, 2008	Mount Lemmon	Mount Lemmon Survey	·	1.4 km	MPC · JPL
461274	2015 XB_{63}	—	September 16, 2009	Catalina	CSS	·	3.8 km	MPC · JPL
461275	2015 XK_{63}	—	January 19, 2005	Kitt Peak	Spacewatch	·	1.3 km	MPC · JPL
461276	2015 XS_{63}	—	October 9, 2004	Kitt Peak	Spacewatch	·	2.3 km	MPC · JPL
461277	2015 XB_{65}	—	August 18, 2006	Anderson Mesa	LONEOS	·	1.3 km	MPC · JPL
461278	2015 XG_{65}	—	February 1, 2009	Kitt Peak	Spacewatch	·	1.2 km	MPC · JPL
461279	2015 XP_{65}	—	January 19, 2010	WISE	WISE	VER	3.5 km	MPC · JPL
461280	2015 XK_{67}	—	October 22, 2006	Kitt Peak	Spacewatch	·	1.6 km	MPC · JPL
461281	2015 XW_{67}	—	May 16, 2005	Mount Lemmon	Mount Lemmon Survey	·	2.1 km	MPC · JPL
461282	2015 XX_{68}	—	November 28, 1994	Kitt Peak	Spacewatch	·	990 m	MPC · JPL
461283	2015 XY_{68}	—	December 31, 2005	Kitt Peak	Spacewatch	·	2.0 km	MPC · JPL
461284	2015 XZ_{68}	—	March 25, 2012	Mount Lemmon	Mount Lemmon Survey	EOS	2.2 km	MPC · JPL
461285	2015 XF_{69}	—	November 4, 2004	Kitt Peak	Spacewatch	·	1.1 km	MPC · JPL
461286	2015 XK_{69}	—	December 1, 2005	Kitt Peak	Spacewatch	·	640 m	MPC · JPL
461287	2015 XF_{73}	—	October 31, 2008	Kitt Peak	Spacewatch	·	700 m	MPC · JPL
461288	2015 XM_{76}	—	January 23, 2006	Kitt Peak	Spacewatch	·	3.3 km	MPC · JPL
461289	2015 XL_{77}	—	January 24, 1996	Kitt Peak	Spacewatch	EOS	2.1 km	MPC · JPL
461290	2015 XM_{81}	—	January 28, 2006	Mount Lemmon	Mount Lemmon Survey	EOS	2.2 km	MPC · JPL
461291	2015 XR_{96}	—	January 19, 2012	Mount Lemmon	Mount Lemmon Survey	·	1.8 km	MPC · JPL
461292	2015 XW_{96}	—	August 10, 2010	Kitt Peak	Spacewatch	·	1.4 km	MPC · JPL
461293	2015 XM_{97}	—	December 20, 2009	Mount Lemmon	Mount Lemmon Survey	·	730 m	MPC · JPL
461294	2015 XS_{100}	—	January 30, 2008	Mount Lemmon	Mount Lemmon Survey	·	1.5 km	MPC · JPL
461295	2015 XA_{106}	—	December 19, 2004	Kitt Peak	Spacewatch	·	3.3 km	MPC · JPL
461296	2015 XO_{110}	—	December 9, 2004	Kitt Peak	Spacewatch	·	3.9 km	MPC · JPL
461297	2015 XV_{111}	—	June 13, 2008	Kitt Peak	Spacewatch	·	3.0 km	MPC · JPL
461298	2015 XB_{118}	—	April 26, 2006	Kitt Peak	Spacewatch	·	4.2 km	MPC · JPL
461299	2015 XM_{134}	—	November 11, 2010	Mount Lemmon	Mount Lemmon Survey	·	1.7 km	MPC · JPL
461300	2015 XO_{135}	—	December 14, 2006	Kitt Peak	Spacewatch	AGN	1.1 km	MPC · JPL

== 461301–461400 ==
back to top

Designation			Discovery			Properties		Ref
Permanent	Provisional	Named after	Date	Site	Discoverer(s)	Category	Diam.	Ref
461301	2015 XD_{139}	—	March 10, 2005	Mount Lemmon	Mount Lemmon Survey	·	1.1 km	MPC · JPL
461302	2015 XH_{140}	—	October 2, 2010	Kitt Peak	Spacewatch	AST	1.3 km	MPC · JPL
461303	2015 XZ_{141}	—	April 14, 2004	Kitt Peak	Spacewatch	·	1.8 km	MPC · JPL
461304	2015 XY_{142}	—	February 27, 2006	Kitt Peak	Spacewatch	·	730 m	MPC · JPL
461305	2015 XO_{146}	—	March 12, 2008	Mount Lemmon	Mount Lemmon Survey	HOF	2.5 km	MPC · JPL
461306	2015 XA_{166}	—	October 8, 2007	Mount Lemmon	Mount Lemmon Survey	PHO	740 m	MPC · JPL
461307	2015 XJ_{167}	—	March 14, 2010	WISE	WISE	·	2.7 km	MPC · JPL
461308	2015 XC_{170}	—	December 15, 2004	Kitt Peak	Spacewatch	·	2.7 km	MPC · JPL
461309	2015 XG_{170}	—	December 15, 2006	Kitt Peak	Spacewatch	·	1.9 km	MPC · JPL
461310	2015 XJ_{170}	—	December 2, 2010	Mount Lemmon	Mount Lemmon Survey	EOS	1.8 km	MPC · JPL
461311	2015 XD_{172}	—	July 13, 2010	Kitt Peak	Spacewatch	·	2.4 km	MPC · JPL
461312	2015 XH_{174}	—	December 3, 2010	Kitt Peak	Spacewatch	·	3.2 km	MPC · JPL
461313	2015 XG_{176}	—	February 29, 2008	Kitt Peak	Spacewatch	WIT	1.1 km	MPC · JPL
461314	2015 XS_{179}	—	January 2, 2009	Mount Lemmon	Mount Lemmon Survey	V	670 m	MPC · JPL
461315	2015 XF_{195}	—	June 27, 2005	Mount Lemmon	Mount Lemmon Survey	·	1.5 km	MPC · JPL
461316	2015 XN_{196}	—	January 19, 2004	Kitt Peak	Spacewatch	·	1.1 km	MPC · JPL
461317	2015 XM_{203}	—	October 1, 2003	Kitt Peak	Spacewatch	·	2.9 km	MPC · JPL
461318	2015 XT_{203}	—	January 6, 2005	Socorro	LINEAR	MAS	750 m	MPC · JPL
461319	2015 XC_{235}	—	October 8, 2004	Kitt Peak	Spacewatch	·	2.0 km	MPC · JPL
461320	2015 XH_{235}	—	November 26, 2005	Kitt Peak	Spacewatch	·	1.5 km	MPC · JPL
461321	2015 XL_{245}	—	December 9, 2004	Kitt Peak	Spacewatch	·	2.1 km	MPC · JPL
461322	2015 XB_{246}	—	November 18, 2009	Catalina	CSS	·	3.9 km	MPC · JPL
461323	2015 XS_{260}	—	November 6, 2010	Mount Lemmon	Mount Lemmon Survey	·	2.0 km	MPC · JPL
461324	2015 XH_{262}	—	October 15, 2004	Mount Lemmon	Mount Lemmon Survey	·	2.0 km	MPC · JPL
461325	2015 XN_{262}	—	November 20, 2000	Kitt Peak	Spacewatch	·	2.0 km	MPC · JPL
461326	2015 XO_{262}	—	May 16, 2009	Kitt Peak	Spacewatch	·	1.9 km	MPC · JPL
461327	2015 XG_{263}	—	February 20, 2006	Kitt Peak	Spacewatch	·	1.0 km	MPC · JPL
461328	2015 XA_{266}	—	December 5, 2005	Mount Lemmon	Mount Lemmon Survey	KOR	1.2 km	MPC · JPL
461329	2015 XJ_{266}	—	August 31, 2005	Kitt Peak	Spacewatch	AGN	900 m	MPC · JPL
461330	2015 XC_{276}	—	October 31, 2005	Mount Lemmon	Mount Lemmon Survey	·	2.1 km	MPC · JPL
461331	2015 XX_{278}	—	December 19, 2004	Mount Lemmon	Mount Lemmon Survey	·	3.0 km	MPC · JPL
461332	2015 XV_{309}	—	January 10, 2008	Mount Lemmon	Mount Lemmon Survey	·	1.2 km	MPC · JPL
461333	2015 XM_{311}	—	August 30, 2005	Kitt Peak	Spacewatch	AGN	910 m	MPC · JPL
461334	2015 XS_{311}	—	February 12, 2004	Kitt Peak	Spacewatch	(5)	1.1 km	MPC · JPL
461335	2015 XY_{312}	—	March 28, 2008	Mount Lemmon	Mount Lemmon Survey	·	1.6 km	MPC · JPL
461336	2015 XM_{313}	—	December 8, 1999	Kitt Peak	Spacewatch	·	2.5 km	MPC · JPL
461337	2015 XM_{322}	—	September 29, 2005	Mount Lemmon	Mount Lemmon Survey	·	2.0 km	MPC · JPL
461338	2015 XY_{337}	—	January 11, 2005	Socorro	LINEAR	·	1.4 km	MPC · JPL
461339	6365 P-L	—	September 24, 1960	Palomar	C. J. van Houten, I. van Houten-Groeneveld, T. Gehrels	·	600 m	MPC · JPL
461340	3073 T-2	—	September 30, 1973	Palomar	C. J. van Houten, I. van Houten-Groeneveld, T. Gehrels	·	830 m	MPC · JPL
461341	1995 SC_{41}	—	September 25, 1995	Kitt Peak	Spacewatch	·	1.5 km	MPC · JPL
461342	1995 SX_{42}	—	September 25, 1995	Kitt Peak	Spacewatch	MAS	580 m	MPC · JPL
461343	1995 SG_{76}	—	September 20, 1995	Kitt Peak	Spacewatch	HOF	2.2 km	MPC · JPL
461344	1995 SV_{79}	—	September 21, 1995	Kitt Peak	Spacewatch	·	1.5 km	MPC · JPL
461345	1995 UQ_{31}	—	October 21, 1995	Kitt Peak	Spacewatch	·	2.1 km	MPC · JPL
461346	1995 UD_{39}	—	October 22, 1995	Kitt Peak	Spacewatch	NYS	990 m	MPC · JPL
461347	1995 UL_{40}	—	October 17, 1995	Kitt Peak	Spacewatch	·	1.5 km	MPC · JPL
461348	1995 WA_{14}	—	November 16, 1995	Kitt Peak	Spacewatch	·	2.2 km	MPC · JPL
461349	1997 SU_{13}	—	September 28, 1997	Kitt Peak	Spacewatch	EOS	2.1 km	MPC · JPL
461350	1998 PY	—	August 14, 1998	Woomera	F. B. Zoltowski	·	2.1 km	MPC · JPL
461351	1998 WW_{37}	—	October 12, 1998	Kitt Peak	Spacewatch	L4	10 km	MPC · JPL
461352	1999 FR_{65}	—	March 20, 1999	Apache Point	SDSS	PHO	900 m	MPC · JPL
461353	1999 LS_{7}	—	June 8, 1999	Socorro	LINEAR	APO · PHA	210 m	MPC · JPL
461354	1999 UO_{28}	—	October 31, 1999	Kitt Peak	Spacewatch	MAS	730 m	MPC · JPL
461355	1999 UM_{55}	—	October 20, 1999	Kitt Peak	Spacewatch	·	940 m	MPC · JPL
461356	1999 VN_{46}	—	October 14, 1999	Socorro	LINEAR	H	600 m	MPC · JPL
461357	2000 AF_{226}	—	January 4, 2000	Kitt Peak	Spacewatch	·	1.7 km	MPC · JPL
461358	2000 BA_{51}	—	January 16, 2000	Kitt Peak	Spacewatch	·	3.0 km	MPC · JPL
461359	2000 CV_{97}	—	February 5, 2000	Kitt Peak	Spacewatch	·	610 m	MPC · JPL
461360	2000 EH_{23}	—	March 3, 2000	Kitt Peak	Spacewatch	·	2.0 km	MPC · JPL
461361	2000 FH_{14}	—	March 30, 2000	Kitt Peak	Spacewatch	·	640 m	MPC · JPL
461362	2000 FR_{52}	—	March 29, 2000	Kitt Peak	Spacewatch	·	2.9 km	MPC · JPL
461363	2000 GQ_{148}	—	April 5, 2000	Socorro	LINEAR	T_{j} (2.9)	10 km	MPC · JPL
461364	2000 HL_{16}	—	April 24, 2000	Kitt Peak	Spacewatch	·	3.6 km	MPC · JPL
461365	2000 JF_{1}	—	May 6, 2000	Socorro	LINEAR	AMO	490 m	MPC · JPL
461366	2000 LJ_{7}	—	May 29, 2000	Kitt Peak	Spacewatch	RAF	890 m	MPC · JPL
461367	2000 QX_{160}	—	August 31, 2000	Socorro	LINEAR	·	840 m	MPC · JPL
461368	2000 RL_{107}	—	September 3, 2000	Apache Point	SDSS	·	1.6 km	MPC · JPL
461369	2000 SK_{9}	—	September 23, 2000	Socorro	LINEAR	·	1.2 km	MPC · JPL
461370	2000 SF_{64}	—	September 24, 2000	Socorro	LINEAR	·	1.7 km	MPC · JPL
461371	2000 SN_{171}	—	September 5, 2000	Socorro	LINEAR	·	890 m	MPC · JPL
461372	2000 SM_{321}	—	September 28, 2000	Kitt Peak	Spacewatch	·	1.7 km	MPC · JPL
461373	2000 TW_{49}	—	October 1, 2000	Anderson Mesa	LONEOS	·	1.8 km	MPC · JPL
461374	2000 WS_{21}	—	October 27, 2000	Socorro	LINEAR	·	960 m	MPC · JPL
461375	2001 FC_{102}	—	March 17, 2001	Socorro	LINEAR	·	2.9 km	MPC · JPL
461376	2001 FA_{126}	—	March 29, 2001	Kitt Peak	Spacewatch	·	1 km	MPC · JPL
461377	2001 FR_{127}	—	March 27, 2001	Haleakala	NEAT	·	430 m	MPC · JPL
461378	2001 FB_{140}	—	March 21, 2001	Haleakala	NEAT	·	1.4 km	MPC · JPL
461379	2001 FC_{199}	—	March 21, 2001	Kitt Peak	SKADS	KOR	1.1 km	MPC · JPL
461380	2001 FT_{199}	—	March 21, 2001	Kitt Peak	SKADS	·	1.1 km	MPC · JPL
461381	2001 HS	—	April 16, 2001	Saint-Véran	St. Veran	MAS	880 m	MPC · JPL
461382	2001 MO_{28}	—	June 26, 2001	Palomar	NEAT	·	1.6 km	MPC · JPL
461383	2001 OR_{28}	—	July 18, 2001	Palomar	NEAT	·	1.2 km	MPC · JPL
461384	2001 OM_{53}	—	July 21, 2001	Palomar	NEAT	·	3.1 km	MPC · JPL
461385	2001 PJ_{14}	—	July 27, 2001	Anderson Mesa	LONEOS	·	1.7 km	MPC · JPL
461386	2001 PZ_{31}	—	August 10, 2001	Palomar	NEAT	·	1.1 km	MPC · JPL
461387	2001 QS_{92}	—	August 22, 2001	Socorro	LINEAR	·	3.6 km	MPC · JPL
461388	2001 RB_{29}	—	September 7, 2001	Socorro	LINEAR	·	990 m	MPC · JPL
461389	2001 RE_{61}	—	September 12, 2001	Socorro	LINEAR	·	2.3 km	MPC · JPL
461390	2001 RG_{140}	—	September 12, 2001	Socorro	LINEAR	·	650 m	MPC · JPL
461391	2001 RD_{146}	—	August 1, 2001	Palomar	NEAT	·	1.8 km	MPC · JPL
461392	2001 RC_{150}	—	September 11, 2001	Anderson Mesa	LONEOS	·	3.6 km	MPC · JPL
461393	2001 SJ_{23}	—	August 27, 2001	Palomar	NEAT	·	1.3 km	MPC · JPL
461394	2001 SS_{24}	—	September 16, 2001	Socorro	LINEAR	·	1.5 km	MPC · JPL
461395	2001 SB_{64}	—	September 17, 2001	Socorro	LINEAR	·	1.8 km	MPC · JPL
461396	2001 SF_{125}	—	September 16, 2001	Socorro	LINEAR	·	1.2 km	MPC · JPL
461397	2001 SD_{170}	—	September 20, 2001	Socorro	LINEAR	AMO +1km	800 m	MPC · JPL
461398	2001 SQ_{180}	—	September 19, 2001	Socorro	LINEAR	T_{j} (2.98)	4.5 km	MPC · JPL
461399	2001 SC_{183}	—	September 19, 2001	Socorro	LINEAR	·	1.5 km	MPC · JPL
461400	2001 SC_{203}	—	September 19, 2001	Socorro	LINEAR	·	1.0 km	MPC · JPL

== 461401–461500 ==
back to top

Designation			Discovery			Properties		Ref
Permanent	Provisional	Named after	Date	Site	Discoverer(s)	Category	Diam.	Ref
461401	2001 SX_{238}	—	September 19, 2001	Socorro	LINEAR	EUN	1.0 km	MPC · JPL
461402	2001 SK_{264}	—	September 25, 2001	Socorro	LINEAR	H	560 m	MPC · JPL
461403	2001 SR_{264}	—	September 21, 2001	Socorro	LINEAR	H	350 m	MPC · JPL
461404	2001 SU_{269}	—	September 19, 2001	Kitt Peak	Spacewatch	·	1.1 km	MPC · JPL
461405	2001 SG_{293}	—	September 18, 2001	Kitt Peak	Spacewatch	·	3.1 km	MPC · JPL
461406	2001 SA_{309}	—	September 22, 2001	Socorro	LINEAR	·	1.1 km	MPC · JPL
461407	2001 SP_{323}	—	September 18, 2001	Anderson Mesa	LONEOS	·	1.5 km	MPC · JPL
461408	2001 SC_{356}	—	December 18, 2001	Kitt Peak	Spacewatch	·	1.5 km	MPC · JPL
461409	2001 TK_{25}	—	October 14, 2001	Socorro	LINEAR	EUN	1.1 km	MPC · JPL
461410	2001 TS_{47}	—	October 14, 2001	Cima Ekar	ADAS	·	1.5 km	MPC · JPL
461411	2001 TL_{90}	—	October 14, 2001	Socorro	LINEAR	H	520 m	MPC · JPL
461412	2001 TB_{93}	—	October 14, 2001	Socorro	LINEAR	EUN	1.3 km	MPC · JPL
461413	2001 TC_{132}	—	October 11, 2001	Palomar	NEAT	BRG	1.3 km	MPC · JPL
461414	2001 TA_{140}	—	October 10, 2001	Palomar	NEAT	H	580 m	MPC · JPL
461415	2001 TY_{145}	—	September 16, 2001	Socorro	LINEAR	·	1.6 km	MPC · JPL
461416	2001 TB_{176}	—	October 14, 2001	Socorro	LINEAR	(5)	1.1 km	MPC · JPL
461417	2001 TH_{214}	—	October 13, 2001	Palomar	NEAT	·	1.7 km	MPC · JPL
461418	2001 TY_{214}	—	October 13, 2001	Palomar	NEAT	·	2.0 km	MPC · JPL
461419	2001 UH_{1}	—	October 16, 2001	Kleť	M. Tichý	·	1.2 km	MPC · JPL
461420	2001 UE_{2}	—	October 17, 2001	Socorro	LINEAR	H	570 m	MPC · JPL
461421	2001 UH_{28}	—	October 16, 2001	Socorro	LINEAR	JUN	990 m	MPC · JPL
461422	2001 UZ_{115}	—	October 22, 2001	Socorro	LINEAR	·	1.6 km	MPC · JPL
461423	2001 UL_{178}	—	October 23, 2001	Palomar	NEAT	·	1.6 km	MPC · JPL
461424	2001 UQ_{199}	—	October 19, 2001	Palomar	NEAT	MAR	960 m	MPC · JPL
461425	2001 UB_{202}	—	October 13, 2001	Socorro	LINEAR	·	670 m	MPC · JPL
461426	2001 UN_{209}	—	October 20, 2001	Palomar	NEAT	EUN	970 m	MPC · JPL
461427	2001 UW_{225}	—	October 16, 2001	Palomar	NEAT	·	1.2 km	MPC · JPL
461428	2001 VZ_{5}	—	November 9, 2001	Socorro	LINEAR	·	1.3 km	MPC · JPL
461429	2001 VU_{12}	—	November 10, 2001	Socorro	LINEAR	H	650 m	MPC · JPL
461430	2001 VF_{21}	—	October 21, 2001	Socorro	LINEAR	JUN	1.3 km	MPC · JPL
461431	2001 VR_{21}	—	November 9, 2001	Socorro	LINEAR	·	1.9 km	MPC · JPL
461432	2001 WT_{15}	—	November 26, 2001	Socorro	LINEAR	·	2.8 km	MPC · JPL
461433	2001 WT_{69}	—	November 9, 2001	Socorro	LINEAR	·	1.7 km	MPC · JPL
461434	2001 XK_{72}	—	November 17, 2001	Socorro	LINEAR	CLO	1.8 km	MPC · JPL
461435	2001 XB_{141}	—	December 14, 2001	Socorro	LINEAR	·	690 m	MPC · JPL
461436	2002 AH_{53}	—	December 18, 2001	Socorro	LINEAR	·	2.0 km	MPC · JPL
461437	2002 AC_{77}	—	January 8, 2002	Socorro	LINEAR	·	1.6 km	MPC · JPL
461438	2002 AX_{146}	—	December 18, 2001	Kitt Peak	Spacewatch	·	2.3 km	MPC · JPL
461439	2002 CT_{208}	—	February 10, 2002	Socorro	LINEAR	·	1.9 km	MPC · JPL
461440	2002 CR_{311}	—	February 11, 2002	Socorro	LINEAR	·	2.2 km	MPC · JPL
461441	2002 EJ_{90}	—	March 12, 2002	Socorro	LINEAR	·	2.3 km	MPC · JPL
461442	2002 EW_{92}	—	February 10, 2002	Kitt Peak	Spacewatch	·	760 m	MPC · JPL
461443	2002 EO_{107}	—	March 9, 2002	Kitt Peak	Spacewatch	·	630 m	MPC · JPL
461444	2002 EB_{142}	—	March 12, 2002	Palomar	NEAT	·	2.5 km	MPC · JPL
461445	2002 GL_{6}	—	March 14, 2002	Kitt Peak	Spacewatch	·	2.0 km	MPC · JPL
461446	2002 GU_{26}	—	April 11, 2002	Palomar	NEAT	PHO	930 m	MPC · JPL
461447	2002 GY_{62}	—	April 8, 2002	Palomar	NEAT	·	1.9 km	MPC · JPL
461448	2002 GV_{101}	—	April 10, 2002	Socorro	LINEAR	·	730 m	MPC · JPL
461449	2002 GL_{103}	—	April 10, 2002	Socorro	LINEAR	·	880 m	MPC · JPL
461450	2002 GO_{191}	—	May 9, 2007	Mount Lemmon	Mount Lemmon Survey	·	2.7 km	MPC · JPL
461451	2002 JC_{96}	—	May 11, 2002	Socorro	LINEAR	·	980 m	MPC · JPL
461452	2002 NQ	—	July 4, 2002	Kitt Peak	Spacewatch	·	2.1 km	MPC · JPL
461453	2002 NH_{79}	—	April 17, 2009	Kitt Peak	Spacewatch	·	1.6 km	MPC · JPL
461454	2002 PD_{28}	—	July 7, 2002	Kitt Peak	Spacewatch	·	1.1 km	MPC · JPL
461455	2002 PX_{51}	—	August 8, 2002	Palomar	NEAT	·	1.4 km	MPC · JPL
461456	2002 PR_{52}	—	August 8, 2002	Palomar	NEAT	·	2.8 km	MPC · JPL
461457	2002 PJ_{166}	—	August 14, 2002	Palomar	R. Matson	EOS	1.9 km	MPC · JPL
461458	2002 PL_{194}	—	August 11, 2002	Palomar	NEAT	·	3.3 km	MPC · JPL
461459	2002 PF_{198}	—	March 19, 2009	Mount Lemmon	Mount Lemmon Survey	·	1.0 km	MPC · JPL
461460	2002 QO_{17}	—	July 7, 2002	Kitt Peak	Spacewatch	·	1.5 km	MPC · JPL
461461	2002 QL_{39}	—	August 30, 2002	Kitt Peak	Spacewatch	·	2.7 km	MPC · JPL
461462	2002 QC_{50}	—	August 16, 2002	Palomar	NEAT	·	1.6 km	MPC · JPL
461463	2002 QS_{52}	—	August 29, 2002	Palomar	NEAT	·	2.2 km	MPC · JPL
461464	2002 QY_{75}	—	August 30, 2002	Palomar	NEAT	·	2.6 km	MPC · JPL
461465	2002 QT_{81}	—	August 19, 2002	Palomar	NEAT	EOS	1.8 km	MPC · JPL
461466	2002 QC_{118}	—	August 29, 2002	Kitt Peak	Spacewatch	·	2.3 km	MPC · JPL
461467	2002 QG_{118}	—	August 19, 2002	Palomar	NEAT	EOS	2.0 km	MPC · JPL
461468	2002 QW_{136}	—	September 13, 2002	Palomar	NEAT	·	2.0 km	MPC · JPL
461469	2002 QU_{139}	—	August 16, 2002	Haleakala	NEAT	·	2.5 km	MPC · JPL
461470	2002 QB_{143}	—	August 28, 2002	Palomar	NEAT	·	2.5 km	MPC · JPL
461471	2002 QJ_{152}	—	October 10, 2008	Mount Lemmon	Mount Lemmon Survey	EOS	1.5 km	MPC · JPL
461472	2002 RO_{53}	—	September 5, 2002	Socorro	LINEAR	PHO	960 m	MPC · JPL
461473	2002 RC_{89}	—	September 5, 2002	Socorro	LINEAR	NYS	1.0 km	MPC · JPL
461474	2002 RR_{142}	—	September 11, 2002	Palomar	NEAT	·	850 m	MPC · JPL
461475	2002 RS_{147}	—	September 7, 2002	Socorro	LINEAR	·	3.2 km	MPC · JPL
461476	2002 RW_{159}	—	September 12, 2002	Palomar	NEAT	EOS	2.1 km	MPC · JPL
461477	2002 RE_{227}	—	September 14, 2002	Palomar	NEAT	LIX	3.1 km	MPC · JPL
461478	2002 RQ_{239}	—	September 14, 2002	Palomar	NEAT	V	700 m	MPC · JPL
461479	2002 RG_{252}	—	October 5, 2002	Apache Point	SDSS	EOS	1.7 km	MPC · JPL
461480	2002 RQ_{252}	—	September 15, 2002	Palomar	NEAT	·	1.5 km	MPC · JPL
461481	2002 RB_{266}	—	September 13, 2002	Palomar	NEAT	HYG	2.6 km	MPC · JPL
461482	2002 RM_{268}	—	September 4, 2002	Palomar	NEAT	NYS	1.1 km	MPC · JPL
461483	2002 RJ_{291}	—	October 2, 2006	Mount Lemmon	Mount Lemmon Survey	·	1.2 km	MPC · JPL
461484	2002 RK_{292}	—	September 12, 2002	Palomar	NEAT	·	3.1 km	MPC · JPL
461485	2002 SB_{25}	—	September 28, 2002	Haleakala	NEAT	NYS	1.4 km	MPC · JPL
461486	2002 SC_{65}	—	September 27, 2002	Palomar	NEAT	·	3.5 km	MPC · JPL
461487	2002 TZ_{234}	—	October 6, 2002	Socorro	LINEAR	TIR	2.8 km	MPC · JPL
461488	2002 TT_{247}	—	October 10, 2002	Socorro	LINEAR	T_{j} (2.98)	3.2 km	MPC · JPL
461489	2002 TW_{303}	—	October 4, 2002	Apache Point	SDSS	·	2.9 km	MPC · JPL
461490	2002 TL_{318}	—	October 5, 2002	Apache Point	SDSS	·	2.3 km	MPC · JPL
461491	2002 TK_{345}	—	October 5, 2002	Apache Point	SDSS	·	2.5 km	MPC · JPL
461492	2002 UH_{75}	—	October 31, 2002	Palomar	NEAT	·	2.9 km	MPC · JPL
461493	2002 VH_{140}	—	January 16, 2004	Kitt Peak	Spacewatch	·	3.5 km	MPC · JPL
461494	2002 WN_{8}	—	November 24, 2002	Palomar	NEAT	·	1.4 km	MPC · JPL
461495	2002 XP_{117}	—	December 10, 2002	Palomar	NEAT	·	1.3 km	MPC · JPL
461496	2003 AA_{67}	—	January 7, 2003	Socorro	LINEAR	·	1.3 km	MPC · JPL
461497	2003 BM_{6}	—	January 7, 2003	Socorro	LINEAR	·	2.9 km	MPC · JPL
461498	2003 BW_{80}	—	January 30, 2003	Anderson Mesa	LONEOS	·	1.6 km	MPC · JPL
461499	2003 BL_{81}	—	January 31, 2003	Socorro	LINEAR	·	1.3 km	MPC · JPL
461500	2003 BC_{87}	—	January 26, 2003	Kitt Peak	Spacewatch	·	1.2 km	MPC · JPL

== 461501–461600 ==
back to top

Designation			Discovery			Properties		Ref
Permanent	Provisional	Named after	Date	Site	Discoverer(s)	Category	Diam.	Ref
461501	2003 FT_{3}	—	March 26, 2003	Anderson Mesa	LONEOS	AMO	650 m	MPC · JPL
461502	2003 FN_{103}	—	March 24, 2003	Kitt Peak	Spacewatch	H	590 m	MPC · JPL
461503	2003 FJ_{122}	—	March 31, 2003	Cerro Tololo	Deep Lens Survey	·	3.0 km	MPC · JPL
461504	2003 HE_{16}	—	April 25, 2003	Campo Imperatore	CINEOS	·	2.1 km	MPC · JPL
461505	2003 KB_{5}	—	May 22, 2003	Kitt Peak	Spacewatch	·	590 m	MPC · JPL
461506	2003 QE_{29}	—	August 23, 2003	Haleakala	NEAT	·	1.3 km	MPC · JPL
461507	2003 QQ_{44}	—	August 23, 2003	Palomar	NEAT	·	690 m	MPC · JPL
461508	2003 RY_{12}	—	August 20, 2003	Palomar	NEAT	·	1.0 km	MPC · JPL
461509	2003 RR_{17}	—	September 15, 2003	Palomar	NEAT	·	2.2 km	MPC · JPL
461510	2003 RG_{19}	—	September 15, 2003	Anderson Mesa	LONEOS	·	790 m	MPC · JPL
461511	2003 SJ_{1}	—	September 16, 2003	Kitt Peak	Spacewatch	V	530 m	MPC · JPL
461512	2003 ST_{27}	—	September 18, 2003	Palomar	NEAT	·	1.2 km	MPC · JPL
461513	2003 SD_{34}	—	September 18, 2003	Kitt Peak	Spacewatch	V	680 m	MPC · JPL
461514	2003 SE_{34}	—	September 18, 2003	Socorro	LINEAR	·	1.0 km	MPC · JPL
461515	2003 SJ_{65}	—	September 18, 2003	Anderson Mesa	LONEOS	·	1.2 km	MPC · JPL
461516	2003 SD_{119}	—	September 16, 2003	Palomar	NEAT	·	1.4 km	MPC · JPL
461517	2003 SL_{126}	—	September 19, 2003	Kitt Peak	Spacewatch	H	550 m	MPC · JPL
461518	2003 SC_{157}	—	September 19, 2003	Anderson Mesa	LONEOS	·	1.1 km	MPC · JPL
461519	2003 SD_{160}	—	September 20, 2003	Socorro	LINEAR	·	2.3 km	MPC · JPL
461520	2003 SL_{161}	—	September 18, 2003	Socorro	LINEAR	·	800 m	MPC · JPL
461521	2003 SE_{214}	—	September 26, 2003	Desert Eagle	W. K. Y. Yeung	·	1.1 km	MPC · JPL
461522	2003 SG_{229}	—	September 27, 2003	Kitt Peak	Spacewatch	H	490 m	MPC · JPL
461523	2003 SX_{243}	—	September 28, 2003	Kitt Peak	Spacewatch	·	2.0 km	MPC · JPL
461524	2003 SS_{264}	—	September 22, 2003	Anderson Mesa	LONEOS	·	1.1 km	MPC · JPL
461525	2003 SW_{290}	—	September 28, 2003	Kitt Peak	Spacewatch	NYS	1.1 km	MPC · JPL
461526	2003 SZ_{299}	—	September 17, 2003	Palomar	NEAT	·	970 m	MPC · JPL
461527	2003 SM_{323}	—	September 16, 2003	Kitt Peak	Spacewatch	·	700 m	MPC · JPL
461528	2003 SJ_{325}	—	September 17, 2003	Kitt Peak	Spacewatch	EOS	1.6 km	MPC · JPL
461529	2003 SE_{334}	—	September 22, 2003	Kitt Peak	Spacewatch	NYS	810 m	MPC · JPL
461530	2003 ST_{336}	—	September 27, 2003	Apache Point	SDSS	EOS	2.0 km	MPC · JPL
461531	2003 SY_{359}	—	September 21, 2003	Kitt Peak	Spacewatch	·	1.0 km	MPC · JPL
461532	2003 ST_{366}	—	September 20, 2003	Kitt Peak	Spacewatch	EOS	1.5 km	MPC · JPL
461533	2003 SH_{401}	—	September 26, 2003	Apache Point	SDSS	·	2.4 km	MPC · JPL
461534	2003 SL_{403}	—	September 16, 2003	Kitt Peak	Spacewatch	KOR	1.2 km	MPC · JPL
461535	2003 SR_{406}	—	September 27, 2003	Apache Point	SDSS	EOS	1.7 km	MPC · JPL
461536	2003 SB_{421}	—	November 14, 1998	Kitt Peak	Spacewatch	·	2.0 km	MPC · JPL
461537	2003 TS_{17}	—	October 15, 2003	Palomar	NEAT	·	1.1 km	MPC · JPL
461538	2003 TY_{40}	—	October 2, 2003	Kitt Peak	Spacewatch	·	2.1 km	MPC · JPL
461539	2003 TV_{46}	—	October 3, 2003	Kitt Peak	Spacewatch	·	1.8 km	MPC · JPL
461540	2003 UA_{105}	—	October 18, 2003	Kitt Peak	Spacewatch	·	2.5 km	MPC · JPL
461541	2003 UN_{130}	—	October 18, 2003	Palomar	NEAT	·	1.1 km	MPC · JPL
461542	2003 UO_{152}	—	October 22, 2003	Kitt Peak	Spacewatch	·	1.2 km	MPC · JPL
461543	2003 UF_{205}	—	September 20, 2003	Campo Imperatore	CINEOS	·	2.0 km	MPC · JPL
461544	2003 UE_{258}	—	October 19, 2003	Kitt Peak	Spacewatch	·	1.2 km	MPC · JPL
461545	2003 UP_{345}	—	September 18, 2003	Kitt Peak	Spacewatch	·	2.0 km	MPC · JPL
461546	2003 UE_{364}	—	October 20, 2003	Kitt Peak	Spacewatch	V	650 m	MPC · JPL
461547	2003 UU_{401}	—	October 23, 2003	Apache Point	SDSS	·	860 m	MPC · JPL
461548	2003 VN_{3}	—	October 20, 2003	Kitt Peak	Spacewatch	·	820 m	MPC · JPL
461549	2003 VP_{3}	—	November 15, 2003	Kitt Peak	Spacewatch	·	4.1 km	MPC · JPL
461550	2003 WO_{5}	—	November 18, 2003	Palomar	NEAT	·	3.1 km	MPC · JPL
461551	2003 WG_{17}	—	November 18, 2003	Palomar	NEAT	·	3.1 km	MPC · JPL
461552	2003 WH_{32}	—	October 28, 2003	Socorro	LINEAR	·	1.1 km	MPC · JPL
461553	2003 WJ_{44}	—	September 23, 1997	Kitt Peak	Spacewatch	·	2.3 km	MPC · JPL
461554	2003 WH_{45}	—	November 20, 2003	Socorro	LINEAR	TIR	3.1 km	MPC · JPL
461555	2003 WG_{101}	—	November 21, 2003	Socorro	LINEAR	·	3.8 km	MPC · JPL
461556	2003 WU_{162}	—	November 30, 2003	Kitt Peak	Spacewatch	·	2.6 km	MPC · JPL
461557	2003 WQ_{173}	—	November 18, 2003	Kitt Peak	Spacewatch	·	2.3 km	MPC · JPL
461558	2003 XZ_{39}	—	December 14, 2003	Kitt Peak	Spacewatch	LIX	3.2 km	MPC · JPL
461559	2003 YW_{38}	—	December 19, 2003	Socorro	LINEAR	·	3.7 km	MPC · JPL
461560	2003 YQ_{130}	—	December 28, 2003	Socorro	LINEAR	·	2.9 km	MPC · JPL
461561	2004 BK_{127}	—	January 16, 2004	Kitt Peak	Spacewatch	·	2.6 km	MPC · JPL
461562	2004 BY_{141}	—	January 19, 2004	Kitt Peak	Spacewatch	·	2.3 km	MPC · JPL
461563	2004 DG_{33}	—	February 18, 2004	Socorro	LINEAR	·	3.4 km	MPC · JPL
461564	2004 DX_{76}	—	February 18, 2004	Kitt Peak	Spacewatch	·	2.1 km	MPC · JPL
461565	2004 EO_{11}	—	March 10, 2004	Palomar	NEAT	·	1.3 km	MPC · JPL
461566	2004 EL_{62}	—	March 12, 2004	Palomar	NEAT	·	1.1 km	MPC · JPL
461567	2004 FK_{121}	—	March 23, 2004	Socorro	LINEAR	·	1.2 km	MPC · JPL
461568	2004 GV_{78}	—	April 11, 2004	Palomar	NEAT	CYB	2.0 km	MPC · JPL
461569	2004 HT_{55}	—	April 24, 2004	Socorro	LINEAR	·	1.6 km	MPC · JPL
461570	2004 JA_{55}	—	May 10, 2004	Kitt Peak	Spacewatch	·	1.5 km	MPC · JPL
461571	2004 NC_{14}	—	July 11, 2004	Socorro	LINEAR	·	1.3 km	MPC · JPL
461572	2004 NT_{29}	—	July 14, 2004	Socorro	LINEAR	·	1.9 km	MPC · JPL
461573	2004 OA_{13}	—	June 14, 2004	Palomar	NEAT	·	1.5 km	MPC · JPL
461574	2004 PD	—	August 4, 2004	Palomar	NEAT	·	1.8 km	MPC · JPL
461575	2004 PP_{2}	—	August 8, 2004	Palomar	NEAT	·	770 m	MPC · JPL
461576	2004 PA_{3}	—	August 3, 2004	Siding Spring	SSS	·	810 m	MPC · JPL
461577	2004 PN_{12}	—	August 7, 2004	Palomar	NEAT	·	2.6 km	MPC · JPL
461578	2004 PG_{21}	—	August 7, 2004	Palomar	NEAT	·	3.3 km	MPC · JPL
461579	2004 PU_{26}	—	August 9, 2004	Socorro	LINEAR	·	740 m	MPC · JPL
461580	2004 PB_{72}	—	August 8, 2004	Socorro	LINEAR	·	1.3 km	MPC · JPL
461581	2004 PM_{114}	—	August 9, 2004	Palomar	NEAT	JUN	1.1 km	MPC · JPL
461582	2004 RL_{40}	—	August 25, 2004	Kitt Peak	Spacewatch	AGN	1 km	MPC · JPL
461583	2004 RF_{43}	—	August 8, 2004	Anderson Mesa	LONEOS	·	1.5 km	MPC · JPL
461584	2004 RT_{67}	—	September 8, 2004	Socorro	LINEAR	·	1.6 km	MPC · JPL
461585	2004 RR_{110}	—	September 11, 2004	Socorro	LINEAR	·	1.5 km	MPC · JPL
461586	2004 RR_{145}	—	August 26, 2004	Catalina	CSS	·	630 m	MPC · JPL
461587	2004 RL_{180}	—	September 10, 2004	Socorro	LINEAR	·	1.8 km	MPC · JPL
461588	2004 RM_{235}	—	September 10, 2004	Socorro	LINEAR	GEF	1.1 km	MPC · JPL
461589	2004 RB_{251}	—	September 14, 2004	Socorro	LINEAR	·	650 m	MPC · JPL
461590	2004 RS_{251}	—	September 11, 2004	Kitt Peak	Spacewatch	·	630 m	MPC · JPL
461591	2004 RM_{269}	—	September 11, 2004	Kitt Peak	Spacewatch	·	530 m	MPC · JPL
461592	2004 RK_{299}	—	September 11, 2004	Kitt Peak	Spacewatch	·	1.8 km	MPC · JPL
461593	2004 RS_{329}	—	September 15, 2004	Kitt Peak	Spacewatch	H	530 m	MPC · JPL
461594	2004 RP_{331}	—	September 15, 2004	Socorro	LINEAR	·	1.8 km	MPC · JPL
461595	2004 RM_{335}	—	September 15, 2004	Siding Spring	SSS	H	550 m	MPC · JPL
461596	2004 SA_{21}	—	September 21, 2004	Socorro	LINEAR	H	550 m	MPC · JPL
461597	2004 SC_{28}	—	September 16, 2004	Kitt Peak	Spacewatch	·	2.3 km	MPC · JPL
461598	2004 TW_{5}	—	October 5, 2004	Kitt Peak	Spacewatch	·	2.0 km	MPC · JPL
461599	2004 TV_{45}	—	October 4, 2004	Kitt Peak	Spacewatch	·	610 m	MPC · JPL
461600	2004 TO_{54}	—	October 4, 2004	Kitt Peak	Spacewatch	·	630 m	MPC · JPL

== 461601–461700 ==
back to top

Designation			Discovery			Properties		Ref
Permanent	Provisional	Named after	Date	Site	Discoverer(s)	Category	Diam.	Ref
461601	2004 TO_{111}	—	October 7, 2004	Kitt Peak	Spacewatch	·	750 m	MPC · JPL
461602	2004 TG_{166}	—	October 7, 2004	Kitt Peak	Spacewatch	·	2.0 km	MPC · JPL
461603	2004 TM_{184}	—	October 7, 2004	Kitt Peak	Spacewatch	·	2.0 km	MPC · JPL
461604	2004 TA_{186}	—	October 7, 2004	Kitt Peak	Spacewatch	·	2.2 km	MPC · JPL
461605	2004 TO_{195}	—	October 7, 2004	Kitt Peak	Spacewatch	·	610 m	MPC · JPL
461606	2004 TJ_{227}	—	September 22, 2004	Kitt Peak	Spacewatch	AGN	1.0 km	MPC · JPL
461607	2004 TA_{322}	—	October 11, 2004	Kitt Peak	Spacewatch	·	720 m	MPC · JPL
461608	2004 TH_{336}	—	October 10, 2004	Kitt Peak	Spacewatch	·	630 m	MPC · JPL
461609	2004 UZ_{9}	—	October 30, 2004	Palomar	NEAT	H	620 m	MPC · JPL
461610	2004 XA_{94}	—	December 11, 2004	Kitt Peak	Spacewatch	·	3.0 km	MPC · JPL
461611	2004 YP_{13}	—	December 19, 2004	Mount Lemmon	Mount Lemmon Survey	EOS	2.0 km	MPC · JPL
461612	2005 AT_{5}	—	January 6, 2005	Catalina	CSS	·	1.5 km	MPC · JPL
461613	2005 AQ_{8}	—	December 15, 2004	Kitt Peak	Spacewatch	·	700 m	MPC · JPL
461614	2005 AU_{23}	—	January 7, 2005	Kitt Peak	Spacewatch	V	580 m	MPC · JPL
461615	2005 AA_{28}	—	January 6, 2005	Socorro	LINEAR	H	640 m	MPC · JPL
461616	2005 AQ_{39}	—	January 13, 2005	Kitt Peak	Spacewatch	·	2.3 km	MPC · JPL
461617	2005 AP_{47}	—	January 13, 2005	Socorro	LINEAR	·	1.0 km	MPC · JPL
461618	2005 AY_{66}	—	January 13, 2005	Catalina	CSS	·	930 m	MPC · JPL
461619	2005 AY_{74}	—	January 15, 2005	Kitt Peak	Spacewatch	·	2.5 km	MPC · JPL
461620	2005 BE_{40}	—	January 16, 2005	Mauna Kea	Veillet, C.	NYS	870 m	MPC · JPL
461621	2005 BS_{48}	—	January 19, 2005	Kitt Peak	Spacewatch	·	920 m	MPC · JPL
461622	2005 CA_{57}	—	January 16, 2005	Kitt Peak	Spacewatch	·	2.8 km	MPC · JPL
461623	2005 CA_{71}	—	February 1, 2005	Kitt Peak	Spacewatch	·	2.4 km	MPC · JPL
461624	2005 DA	—	February 2, 2005	Kitt Peak	Spacewatch	·	790 m	MPC · JPL
461625	2005 EM_{36}	—	March 4, 2005	Catalina	CSS	·	1.0 km	MPC · JPL
461626	2005 EG_{75}	—	March 3, 2005	Kitt Peak	Spacewatch	·	2.6 km	MPC · JPL
461627	2005 ES_{75}	—	March 3, 2005	Kitt Peak	Spacewatch	MAS	680 m	MPC · JPL
461628	2005 EW_{124}	—	February 5, 2005	Palomar	NEAT	·	1.1 km	MPC · JPL
461629	2005 EO_{127}	—	March 9, 2005	Kitt Peak	Spacewatch	·	790 m	MPC · JPL
461630	2005 ES_{155}	—	March 8, 2005	Mount Lemmon	Mount Lemmon Survey	NYS	1.1 km	MPC · JPL
461631	2005 EE_{157}	—	March 9, 2005	Mount Lemmon	Mount Lemmon Survey	·	2.7 km	MPC · JPL
461632	2005 EP_{165}	—	March 4, 2005	Mount Lemmon	Mount Lemmon Survey	NYS	840 m	MPC · JPL
461633	2005 EV_{168}	—	March 11, 2005	Mount Lemmon	Mount Lemmon Survey	NYS	900 m	MPC · JPL
461634	2005 EF_{169}	—	March 10, 2005	Catalina	CSS	T_{j} (2.89)	1.4 km	MPC · JPL
461635	2005 EM_{176}	—	March 8, 2005	Catalina	CSS	·	2.8 km	MPC · JPL
461636	2005 ET_{197}	—	March 11, 2005	Catalina	CSS	·	4.4 km	MPC · JPL
461637	2005 EE_{208}	—	March 4, 2005	Kitt Peak	Spacewatch	MAS	700 m	MPC · JPL
461638	2005 ET_{224}	—	March 9, 2005	Catalina	CSS	·	2.9 km	MPC · JPL
461639	2005 ED_{225}	—	March 13, 2005	Socorro	LINEAR	·	1.6 km	MPC · JPL
461640	2005 EL_{225}	—	March 11, 2005	Mayhill	Lowe, A.	·	2.9 km	MPC · JPL
461641	2005 EB_{240}	—	March 11, 2005	Kitt Peak	Spacewatch	·	860 m	MPC · JPL
461642	2005 EV_{243}	—	March 4, 2005	Mount Lemmon	Mount Lemmon Survey	·	4.6 km	MPC · JPL
461643	2005 EZ_{247}	—	March 12, 2005	Kitt Peak	Spacewatch	·	3.8 km	MPC · JPL
461644	2005 EL_{262}	—	March 13, 2005	Mount Lemmon	Mount Lemmon Survey	·	730 m	MPC · JPL
461645	2005 ET_{268}	—	March 14, 2005	Mount Lemmon	Mount Lemmon Survey	THB	3.7 km	MPC · JPL
461646	2005 EZ_{280}	—	March 10, 2005	Anderson Mesa	LONEOS	·	2.5 km	MPC · JPL
461647	2005 EC_{305}	—	March 11, 2005	Kitt Peak	M. W. Buie	·	1.2 km	MPC · JPL
461648	2005 EX_{306}	—	March 8, 2005	Mount Lemmon	Mount Lemmon Survey	·	3.0 km	MPC · JPL
461649	2005 GN	—	April 1, 2005	Catalina	CSS	·	2.4 km	MPC · JPL
461650 Paisdezső	2005 GP_{9}	Paisdezső	April 3, 2005	Piszkéstető	K. Sárneczky	PHO	1.2 km	MPC · JPL
461651	2005 GM_{11}	—	April 1, 2005	Anderson Mesa	LONEOS	·	1.3 km	MPC · JPL
461652	2005 GM_{15}	—	March 9, 2005	Mount Lemmon	Mount Lemmon Survey	NYS	860 m	MPC · JPL
461653	2005 GN_{15}	—	April 2, 2005	Mount Lemmon	Mount Lemmon Survey	H	440 m	MPC · JPL
461654	2005 GN_{24}	—	April 2, 2005	Mount Lemmon	Mount Lemmon Survey	MAS	550 m	MPC · JPL
461655	2005 GB_{43}	—	April 5, 2005	Anderson Mesa	LONEOS	·	3.8 km	MPC · JPL
461656	2005 GH_{43}	—	March 18, 2005	Catalina	CSS	·	1.0 km	MPC · JPL
461657	2005 GE_{48}	—	April 5, 2005	Mount Lemmon	Mount Lemmon Survey	THM	2.2 km	MPC · JPL
461658	2005 GQ_{57}	—	April 6, 2005	Mount Lemmon	Mount Lemmon Survey	·	3.1 km	MPC · JPL
461659	2005 GT_{67}	—	April 2, 2005	Mount Lemmon	Mount Lemmon Survey	·	3.5 km	MPC · JPL
461660	2005 GR_{121}	—	April 6, 2005	Mount Lemmon	Mount Lemmon Survey	V	560 m	MPC · JPL
461661	2005 GY_{123}	—	March 4, 2005	Mount Lemmon	Mount Lemmon Survey	·	2.5 km	MPC · JPL
461662	2005 GG_{134}	—	April 7, 2005	Mount Lemmon	Mount Lemmon Survey	MAS	680 m	MPC · JPL
461663	2005 GT_{169}	—	April 12, 2005	Kitt Peak	Spacewatch	·	2.5 km	MPC · JPL
461664	2005 GD_{177}	—	April 15, 2005	Kitt Peak	Spacewatch	NYS	1.2 km	MPC · JPL
461665	2005 GM_{179}	—	March 18, 2005	Catalina	CSS	·	1.4 km	MPC · JPL
461666	2005 GO_{182}	—	April 1, 2005	Kitt Peak	Spacewatch	THM	2.4 km	MPC · JPL
461667	2005 GO_{187}	—	April 12, 2005	Kitt Peak	M. W. Buie	·	2.1 km	MPC · JPL
461668	2005 GY_{190}	—	April 12, 2005	Kitt Peak	M. W. Buie	MAS	540 m	MPC · JPL
461669	2005 GX_{227}	—	April 13, 2005	Catalina	CSS	THB	2.8 km	MPC · JPL
461670	2005 HU_{5}	—	April 17, 2005	Kitt Peak	Spacewatch	·	1.3 km	MPC · JPL
461671	2005 JB_{4}	—	May 3, 2005	Kitt Peak	Spacewatch	T_{j} (2.98)	4.1 km	MPC · JPL
461672	2005 JM_{22}	—	May 6, 2005	Kitt Peak	Deep Lens Survey	PHO	960 m	MPC · JPL
461673	2005 JB_{34}	—	May 4, 2005	Kitt Peak	Spacewatch	·	2.5 km	MPC · JPL
461674	2005 JO_{45}	—	May 7, 2005	Catalina	CSS	T_{j} (2.91)	3.4 km	MPC · JPL
461675	2005 JX_{85}	—	April 11, 2005	Mount Lemmon	Mount Lemmon Survey	NYS	890 m	MPC · JPL
461676	2005 JY_{89}	—	May 11, 2005	Socorro	LINEAR	·	3.6 km	MPC · JPL
461677	2005 JN_{100}	—	April 30, 2005	Kitt Peak	Spacewatch	·	1.1 km	MPC · JPL
461678	2005 JU_{129}	—	May 3, 2005	Kitt Peak	Spacewatch	NYS	1.3 km	MPC · JPL
461679	2005 LU_{2}	—	June 2, 2005	Catalina	CSS	·	1.1 km	MPC · JPL
461680	2005 LD_{8}	—	June 6, 2005	Siding Spring	SSS	·	1.5 km	MPC · JPL
461681	2005 LP_{14}	—	June 5, 2005	Kitt Peak	Spacewatch	·	3.4 km	MPC · JPL
461682	2005 MF_{4}	—	June 16, 2005	Kitt Peak	Spacewatch	THB	2.5 km	MPC · JPL
461683	2005 MT_{9}	—	June 28, 2005	Palomar	NEAT	·	1.7 km	MPC · JPL
461684	2005 MY_{13}	—	June 2, 2005	Catalina	CSS	·	1.2 km	MPC · JPL
461685	2005 MF_{17}	—	June 15, 2005	Mount Lemmon	Mount Lemmon Survey	·	1.5 km	MPC · JPL
461686	2005 MV_{19}	—	June 29, 2005	Kitt Peak	Spacewatch	PHO	870 m	MPC · JPL
461687	2005 MQ_{49}	—	May 14, 2005	Kitt Peak	Spacewatch	·	2.8 km	MPC · JPL
461688	2005 NV_{23}	—	July 4, 2005	Kitt Peak	Spacewatch	EUN	1.2 km	MPC · JPL
461689	2005 NB_{68}	—	June 14, 2005	Mount Lemmon	Mount Lemmon Survey	(5)	1.1 km	MPC · JPL
461690	2005 NG_{125}	—	July 4, 2005	Palomar	NEAT	·	1.5 km	MPC · JPL
461691	2005 QH_{4}	—	July 9, 2005	Catalina	CSS	·	1.7 km	MPC · JPL
461692	2005 QN_{7}	—	October 15, 2001	Palomar	NEAT	·	1.2 km	MPC · JPL
461693	2005 QX_{83}	—	August 29, 2005	Anderson Mesa	LONEOS	·	2.1 km	MPC · JPL
461694	2005 QV_{116}	—	August 28, 2005	Kitt Peak	Spacewatch	·	1.3 km	MPC · JPL
461695	2005 QA_{126}	—	August 28, 2005	Kitt Peak	Spacewatch	·	1.0 km	MPC · JPL
461696	2005 QT_{128}	—	August 28, 2005	Kitt Peak	Spacewatch	·	1.3 km	MPC · JPL
461697	2005 QK_{139}	—	August 28, 2005	Kitt Peak	Spacewatch	·	1.5 km	MPC · JPL
461698	2005 QJ_{157}	—	August 30, 2005	Palomar	NEAT	·	1.6 km	MPC · JPL
461699	2005 QA_{161}	—	August 28, 2005	Kitt Peak	Spacewatch	·	2.2 km	MPC · JPL
461700	2005 QW_{174}	—	August 31, 2005	Socorro	LINEAR	·	2.0 km	MPC · JPL

== 461701–461800 ==
back to top

Designation			Discovery			Properties		Ref
Permanent	Provisional	Named after	Date	Site	Discoverer(s)	Category	Diam.	Ref
461701	2005 RO_{13}	—	September 1, 2005	Kitt Peak	Spacewatch	·	910 m	MPC · JPL
461702	2005 RA_{31}	—	July 30, 2005	Palomar	NEAT	·	1.7 km	MPC · JPL
461703	2005 RJ_{32}	—	September 13, 2005	Kitt Peak	Spacewatch	·	1.2 km	MPC · JPL
461704	2005 SL_{17}	—	September 26, 2005	Kitt Peak	Spacewatch	·	1.4 km	MPC · JPL
461705	2005 SV_{40}	—	September 24, 2005	Kitt Peak	Spacewatch	·	2.0 km	MPC · JPL
461706	2005 SX_{44}	—	September 24, 2005	Kitt Peak	Spacewatch	·	1.9 km	MPC · JPL
461707	2005 SS_{46}	—	September 24, 2005	Kitt Peak	Spacewatch	MAR	970 m	MPC · JPL
461708	2005 SA_{62}	—	September 26, 2005	Kitt Peak	Spacewatch	·	1.2 km	MPC · JPL
461709	2005 SG_{67}	—	September 27, 2005	Kitt Peak	Spacewatch	(5)	1.3 km	MPC · JPL
461710	2005 SK_{74}	—	September 24, 2005	Kitt Peak	Spacewatch	·	1.2 km	MPC · JPL
461711	2005 SS_{83}	—	September 24, 2005	Kitt Peak	Spacewatch	MRX	930 m	MPC · JPL
461712	2005 SJ_{84}	—	September 24, 2005	Kitt Peak	Spacewatch	·	1.2 km	MPC · JPL
461713	2005 SY_{99}	—	September 25, 2005	Kitt Peak	Spacewatch	·	1.8 km	MPC · JPL
461714	2005 ST_{117}	—	August 31, 2005	Palomar	NEAT	EUN	1.2 km	MPC · JPL
461715	2005 SY_{118}	—	September 28, 2005	Palomar	NEAT	·	1.6 km	MPC · JPL
461716	2005 SA_{139}	—	September 25, 2005	Kitt Peak	Spacewatch	·	1.3 km	MPC · JPL
461717	2005 SQ_{160}	—	September 27, 2005	Kitt Peak	Spacewatch	·	1.1 km	MPC · JPL
461718	2005 SW_{161}	—	September 27, 2005	Kitt Peak	Spacewatch	·	1.4 km	MPC · JPL
461719	2005 SE_{166}	—	September 28, 2005	Palomar	NEAT	·	1.5 km	MPC · JPL
461720	2005 SF_{175}	—	September 29, 2005	Kitt Peak	Spacewatch	·	1.6 km	MPC · JPL
461721	2005 SF_{211}	—	September 30, 2005	Palomar	NEAT	·	2.4 km	MPC · JPL
461722	2005 SO_{216}	—	September 30, 2005	Mount Lemmon	Mount Lemmon Survey	·	1.3 km	MPC · JPL
461723	2005 SK_{230}	—	September 30, 2005	Mount Lemmon	Mount Lemmon Survey	·	1.3 km	MPC · JPL
461724	2005 TU_{31}	—	October 1, 2005	Kitt Peak	Spacewatch	·	940 m	MPC · JPL
461725	2005 TM_{35}	—	October 1, 2005	Kitt Peak	Spacewatch	·	1.4 km	MPC · JPL
461726	2005 TH_{58}	—	October 1, 2005	Mount Lemmon	Mount Lemmon Survey	MIS	2.7 km	MPC · JPL
461727	2005 TM_{66}	—	September 26, 2005	Kitt Peak	Spacewatch	·	1.2 km	MPC · JPL
461728	2005 TX_{91}	—	August 31, 2005	Kitt Peak	Spacewatch	EUN	1.1 km	MPC · JPL
461729	2005 TS_{99}	—	October 3, 2005	Catalina	CSS	·	1.7 km	MPC · JPL
461730	2005 TU_{118}	—	September 26, 2005	Kitt Peak	Spacewatch	·	1.2 km	MPC · JPL
461731	2005 TB_{144}	—	September 24, 2005	Kitt Peak	Spacewatch	·	1.3 km	MPC · JPL
461732	2005 TP_{158}	—	October 9, 2005	Kitt Peak	Spacewatch	·	1.3 km	MPC · JPL
461733	2005 TY_{159}	—	September 26, 2005	Kitt Peak	Spacewatch	·	1.5 km	MPC · JPL
461734	2005 TO_{166}	—	October 9, 2005	Kitt Peak	Spacewatch	·	1.3 km	MPC · JPL
461735	2005 TG_{191}	—	October 1, 2005	Anderson Mesa	LONEOS	·	1.7 km	MPC · JPL
461736	2005 TH_{196}	—	October 9, 2005	Kitt Peak	Spacewatch	·	1.4 km	MPC · JPL
461737	2005 UN_{3}	—	October 14, 2005	Anderson Mesa	LONEOS	·	1.8 km	MPC · JPL
461738	2005 UY_{11}	—	April 25, 2003	Kitt Peak	Spacewatch	·	1.8 km	MPC · JPL
461739	2005 UY_{30}	—	October 5, 2005	Kitt Peak	Spacewatch	·	1.8 km	MPC · JPL
461740	2005 UA_{59}	—	October 24, 2005	Kitt Peak	Spacewatch	·	1.9 km	MPC · JPL
461741	2005 UD_{62}	—	October 25, 2005	Mount Lemmon	Mount Lemmon Survey	·	1.6 km	MPC · JPL
461742	2005 UX_{95}	—	October 22, 2005	Kitt Peak	Spacewatch	·	910 m	MPC · JPL
461743	2005 UW_{107}	—	October 22, 2005	Kitt Peak	Spacewatch	·	1.5 km	MPC · JPL
461744	2005 UK_{128}	—	October 1, 2005	Mount Lemmon	Mount Lemmon Survey	·	2.0 km	MPC · JPL
461745	2005 UE_{134}	—	October 25, 2005	Kitt Peak	Spacewatch	·	1.5 km	MPC · JPL
461746	2005 UW_{152}	—	October 26, 2005	Kitt Peak	Spacewatch	·	1.7 km	MPC · JPL
461747	2005 UV_{155}	—	October 26, 2005	Anderson Mesa	LONEOS	·	1.8 km	MPC · JPL
461748	2005 UU_{166}	—	October 24, 2005	Kitt Peak	Spacewatch	·	1.2 km	MPC · JPL
461749	2005 UM_{170}	—	October 24, 2005	Kitt Peak	Spacewatch	GEF	1.3 km	MPC · JPL
461750	2005 UB_{172}	—	October 24, 2005	Kitt Peak	Spacewatch	·	1.2 km	MPC · JPL
461751	2005 UX_{187}	—	October 27, 2005	Kitt Peak	Spacewatch	·	1.7 km	MPC · JPL
461752	2005 UP_{195}	—	October 1, 2005	Mount Lemmon	Mount Lemmon Survey	·	1.9 km	MPC · JPL
461753	2005 UP_{219}	—	October 25, 2005	Kitt Peak	Spacewatch	·	1.8 km	MPC · JPL
461754	2005 UY_{225}	—	October 25, 2005	Kitt Peak	Spacewatch	·	1.8 km	MPC · JPL
461755	2005 UA_{230}	—	October 25, 2005	Kitt Peak	Spacewatch	GEF	1.1 km	MPC · JPL
461756	2005 UF_{231}	—	October 25, 2005	Mount Lemmon	Mount Lemmon Survey	·	1.6 km	MPC · JPL
461757	2005 UC_{237}	—	October 25, 2005	Kitt Peak	Spacewatch	·	1.4 km	MPC · JPL
461758	2005 UG_{240}	—	October 25, 2005	Kitt Peak	Spacewatch	·	2.7 km	MPC · JPL
461759	2005 UM_{250}	—	October 2, 2005	Palomar	NEAT	EUN	1.2 km	MPC · JPL
461760	2005 UR_{250}	—	October 23, 2005	Catalina	CSS	·	1.7 km	MPC · JPL
461761	2005 UG_{256}	—	September 29, 2005	Kitt Peak	Spacewatch	·	1.7 km	MPC · JPL
461762	2005 UW_{266}	—	October 27, 2005	Kitt Peak	Spacewatch	·	1.3 km	MPC · JPL
461763	2005 UB_{268}	—	October 27, 2005	Mount Lemmon	Mount Lemmon Survey	·	2.2 km	MPC · JPL
461764	2005 UW_{284}	—	October 26, 2005	Kitt Peak	Spacewatch	·	2.0 km	MPC · JPL
461765	2005 US_{288}	—	October 26, 2005	Kitt Peak	Spacewatch	·	1.4 km	MPC · JPL
461766	2005 UO_{292}	—	October 26, 2005	Kitt Peak	Spacewatch	·	2.0 km	MPC · JPL
461767	2005 UK_{301}	—	October 26, 2005	Kitt Peak	Spacewatch	·	1.4 km	MPC · JPL
461768	2005 UU_{309}	—	October 28, 2005	Mount Lemmon	Mount Lemmon Survey	·	1.5 km	MPC · JPL
461769	2005 UN_{322}	—	October 27, 2005	Mount Lemmon	Mount Lemmon Survey	·	1.1 km	MPC · JPL
461770	2005 UT_{328}	—	October 22, 2005	Kitt Peak	Spacewatch	WIT	810 m	MPC · JPL
461771	2005 UC_{377}	—	October 27, 2005	Kitt Peak	Spacewatch	·	1.7 km	MPC · JPL
461772	2005 UL_{381}	—	October 25, 2005	Kitt Peak	Spacewatch	·	1.5 km	MPC · JPL
461773	2005 UB_{384}	—	May 22, 2003	Kitt Peak	Spacewatch	·	1.8 km	MPC · JPL
461774	2005 US_{386}	—	October 30, 2005	Catalina	CSS	·	2.5 km	MPC · JPL
461775	2005 UL_{387}	—	October 30, 2005	Mount Lemmon	Mount Lemmon Survey	·	1.7 km	MPC · JPL
461776	2005 UE_{390}	—	October 29, 2005	Mount Lemmon	Mount Lemmon Survey	·	1.4 km	MPC · JPL
461777	2005 UA_{415}	—	October 25, 2005	Kitt Peak	Spacewatch	WIT	860 m	MPC · JPL
461778	2005 UP_{430}	—	October 28, 2005	Kitt Peak	Spacewatch	·	1.9 km	MPC · JPL
461779	2005 UM_{460}	—	October 28, 2005	Mount Lemmon	Mount Lemmon Survey	EUN	1.3 km	MPC · JPL
461780	2005 UE_{487}	—	September 30, 2005	Anderson Mesa	LONEOS	·	1.7 km	MPC · JPL
461781	2005 VJ_{9}	—	October 28, 2005	Kitt Peak	Spacewatch	AGN	1.1 km	MPC · JPL
461782	2005 VS_{11}	—	October 26, 2005	Kitt Peak	Spacewatch	·	1.9 km	MPC · JPL
461783	2005 VE_{15}	—	November 1, 2005	Socorro	LINEAR	·	2.8 km	MPC · JPL
461784	2005 VH_{19}	—	October 1, 2005	Mount Lemmon	Mount Lemmon Survey	·	1.9 km	MPC · JPL
461785	2005 VQ_{23}	—	November 1, 2005	Kitt Peak	Spacewatch	·	1.5 km	MPC · JPL
461786	2005 VF_{24}	—	November 1, 2005	Kitt Peak	Spacewatch	·	1.4 km	MPC · JPL
461787	2005 VP_{33}	—	November 2, 2005	Mount Lemmon	Mount Lemmon Survey	·	1.5 km	MPC · JPL
461788	2005 VW_{35}	—	November 3, 2005	Mount Lemmon	Mount Lemmon Survey	EUN	1.5 km	MPC · JPL
461789	2005 VL_{48}	—	November 5, 2005	Mount Lemmon	Mount Lemmon Survey	·	1.4 km	MPC · JPL
461790	2005 VD_{54}	—	October 25, 2005	Kitt Peak	Spacewatch	·	1.3 km	MPC · JPL
461791	2005 VM_{67}	—	November 1, 2005	Mount Lemmon	Mount Lemmon Survey	·	1.5 km	MPC · JPL
461792	2005 VU_{105}	—	March 27, 2003	Kitt Peak	Spacewatch	·	1.6 km	MPC · JPL
461793	2005 VE_{127}	—	September 30, 2005	Mount Lemmon	Mount Lemmon Survey	·	1.2 km	MPC · JPL
461794	2005 VW_{131}	—	November 1, 2005	Apache Point	A. C. Becker	·	1.3 km	MPC · JPL
461795	2005 WX_{13}	—	November 22, 2005	Kitt Peak	Spacewatch	EUN	1.2 km	MPC · JPL
461796	2005 WF_{30}	—	November 21, 2005	Kitt Peak	Spacewatch	·	2.3 km	MPC · JPL
461797	2005 WC_{83}	—	November 25, 2005	Mount Lemmon	Mount Lemmon Survey	·	1.3 km	MPC · JPL
461798	2005 WR_{92}	—	November 25, 2005	Mount Lemmon	Mount Lemmon Survey	·	590 m	MPC · JPL
461799	2005 WF_{116}	—	November 30, 2005	Socorro	LINEAR	·	2.0 km	MPC · JPL
461800	2005 XK_{49}	—	December 2, 2005	Kitt Peak	Spacewatch	·	590 m	MPC · JPL

== 461801–461900 ==
back to top

Designation			Discovery			Properties		Ref
Permanent	Provisional	Named after	Date	Site	Discoverer(s)	Category	Diam.	Ref
461801	2005 YH_{5}	—	November 29, 2005	Kitt Peak	Spacewatch	AGN	1.1 km	MPC · JPL
461802	2005 YE_{13}	—	December 22, 2005	Kitt Peak	Spacewatch	·	1.9 km	MPC · JPL
461803	2005 YG_{14}	—	December 22, 2005	Kitt Peak	Spacewatch	·	1.8 km	MPC · JPL
461804	2005 YM_{17}	—	October 1, 2005	Mount Lemmon	Mount Lemmon Survey	MRX	940 m	MPC · JPL
461805	2005 YY_{26}	—	December 22, 2005	Kitt Peak	Spacewatch	·	1.9 km	MPC · JPL
461806	2005 YL_{43}	—	December 24, 2005	Kitt Peak	Spacewatch	GEF	1.4 km	MPC · JPL
461807	2005 YG_{67}	—	March 23, 2003	Apache Point	SDSS	·	520 m	MPC · JPL
461808	2005 YZ_{73}	—	December 24, 2005	Kitt Peak	Spacewatch	AGN	1.1 km	MPC · JPL
461809	2005 YU_{76}	—	December 24, 2005	Kitt Peak	Spacewatch	·	3.1 km	MPC · JPL
461810	2005 YP_{132}	—	December 26, 2005	Kitt Peak	Spacewatch	·	630 m	MPC · JPL
461811	2005 YK_{179}	—	December 26, 2005	Mount Lemmon	Mount Lemmon Survey	·	2.1 km	MPC · JPL
461812	2005 YW_{193}	—	December 30, 2005	Kitt Peak	Spacewatch	·	470 m	MPC · JPL
461813	2005 YJ_{204}	—	December 25, 2005	Mount Lemmon	Mount Lemmon Survey	·	1.7 km	MPC · JPL
461814	2005 YB_{227}	—	December 8, 2005	Kitt Peak	Spacewatch	·	1.6 km	MPC · JPL
461815	2005 YF_{258}	—	December 21, 2005	Kitt Peak	Spacewatch	·	2.5 km	MPC · JPL
461816	2006 AP_{39}	—	December 2, 2005	Mount Lemmon	Mount Lemmon Survey	·	1.9 km	MPC · JPL
461817	2006 AH_{42}	—	January 6, 2006	Kitt Peak	Spacewatch	·	560 m	MPC · JPL
461818	2006 AH_{50}	—	December 4, 2005	Mount Lemmon	Mount Lemmon Survey	·	2.7 km	MPC · JPL
461819	2006 AX_{50}	—	December 28, 2005	Kitt Peak	Spacewatch	KOR	1.0 km	MPC · JPL
461820	2006 AU_{78}	—	January 4, 2006	Kitt Peak	Spacewatch	AGN	1.3 km	MPC · JPL
461821	2006 BD_{42}	—	January 23, 2006	Kitt Peak	Spacewatch	·	3.5 km	MPC · JPL
461822	2006 BB_{72}	—	January 23, 2006	Kitt Peak	Spacewatch	·	1.7 km	MPC · JPL
461823	2006 BD_{73}	—	January 23, 2006	Kitt Peak	Spacewatch	·	2.1 km	MPC · JPL
461824	2006 BE_{76}	—	January 23, 2006	Kitt Peak	Spacewatch	·	1.2 km	MPC · JPL
461825	2006 BP_{76}	—	January 23, 2006	Kitt Peak	Spacewatch	·	740 m	MPC · JPL
461826	2006 BN_{129}	—	January 7, 2006	Mount Lemmon	Mount Lemmon Survey	·	530 m	MPC · JPL
461827	2006 BG_{130}	—	January 26, 2006	Kitt Peak	Spacewatch	·	710 m	MPC · JPL
461828	2006 BH_{135}	—	January 27, 2006	Mount Lemmon	Mount Lemmon Survey	·	680 m	MPC · JPL
461829	2006 BS_{175}	—	January 27, 2006	Kitt Peak	Spacewatch	·	2.4 km	MPC · JPL
461830	2006 BA_{182}	—	January 27, 2006	Mount Lemmon	Mount Lemmon Survey	·	560 m	MPC · JPL
461831	2006 BD_{207}	—	January 31, 2006	Mount Lemmon	Mount Lemmon Survey	·	1.4 km	MPC · JPL
461832	2006 BR_{263}	—	January 31, 2006	Kitt Peak	Spacewatch	KOR	1.2 km	MPC · JPL
461833	2006 BH_{276}	—	January 31, 2006	Kitt Peak	Spacewatch	L5	9.4 km	MPC · JPL
461834	2006 BT_{281}	—	January 23, 2006	Kitt Peak	Spacewatch	·	600 m	MPC · JPL
461835	2006 BB_{284}	—	January 30, 2006	Kitt Peak	Spacewatch	·	1.4 km	MPC · JPL
461836	2006 CH	—	February 1, 2006	Catalina	CSS	·	770 m	MPC · JPL
461837	2006 DQ_{24}	—	January 30, 2006	Kitt Peak	Spacewatch	·	520 m	MPC · JPL
461838	2006 DU_{35}	—	February 7, 2006	Mount Lemmon	Mount Lemmon Survey	·	580 m	MPC · JPL
461839	2006 DB_{133}	—	February 25, 2006	Kitt Peak	Spacewatch	·	580 m	MPC · JPL
461840	2006 DD_{138}	—	February 25, 2006	Kitt Peak	Spacewatch	·	1.5 km	MPC · JPL
461841	2006 DD_{143}	—	February 25, 2006	Kitt Peak	Spacewatch	KOR	1.2 km	MPC · JPL
461842	2006 DK_{147}	—	February 25, 2006	Mount Lemmon	Mount Lemmon Survey	EOS	1.5 km	MPC · JPL
461843	2006 DN_{174}	—	February 2, 2006	Mount Lemmon	Mount Lemmon Survey	L5	9.6 km	MPC · JPL
461844	2006 DC_{180}	—	February 22, 2006	Catalina	CSS	·	650 m	MPC · JPL
461845	2006 DD_{189}	—	February 27, 2006	Kitt Peak	Spacewatch	·	820 m	MPC · JPL
461846	2006 ET_{18}	—	March 2, 2006	Kitt Peak	Spacewatch	·	1.6 km	MPC · JPL
461847	2006 EX_{49}	—	March 4, 2006	Kitt Peak	Spacewatch	H	360 m	MPC · JPL
461848	2006 ER_{50}	—	February 2, 2006	Mount Lemmon	Mount Lemmon Survey	·	590 m	MPC · JPL
461849	2006 EX_{62}	—	March 5, 2006	Kitt Peak	Spacewatch	·	700 m	MPC · JPL
461850	2006 FK_{15}	—	March 23, 2006	Mount Lemmon	Mount Lemmon Survey	·	520 m	MPC · JPL
461851	2006 FT_{29}	—	March 24, 2006	Mount Lemmon	Mount Lemmon Survey	·	610 m	MPC · JPL
461852	2006 GY_{2}	—	April 9, 2006	Socorro	LINEAR	APO · PHA · moon	590 m	MPC · JPL
461853	2006 GN_{5}	—	April 2, 2006	Kitt Peak	Spacewatch	·	830 m	MPC · JPL
461854	2006 GA_{19}	—	April 2, 2006	Kitt Peak	Spacewatch	·	750 m	MPC · JPL
461855	2006 GK_{28}	—	April 2, 2006	Kitt Peak	Spacewatch	·	490 m	MPC · JPL
461856	2006 GO_{46}	—	April 8, 2006	Kitt Peak	Spacewatch	·	3.9 km	MPC · JPL
461857	2006 HM_{15}	—	April 20, 2006	Kitt Peak	Spacewatch	·	2.3 km	MPC · JPL
461858	2006 HX_{18}	—	April 18, 2006	Kitt Peak	Spacewatch	·	1.8 km	MPC · JPL
461859	2006 HP_{21}	—	April 20, 2006	Kitt Peak	Spacewatch	·	1.8 km	MPC · JPL
461860	2006 HE_{32}	—	April 19, 2006	Kitt Peak	Spacewatch	·	710 m	MPC · JPL
461861	2006 HW_{39}	—	April 21, 2006	Kitt Peak	Spacewatch	·	770 m	MPC · JPL
461862	2006 HE_{52}	—	March 25, 2006	Kitt Peak	Spacewatch	H	570 m	MPC · JPL
461863	2006 HV_{72}	—	April 25, 2006	Kitt Peak	Spacewatch	·	2.7 km	MPC · JPL
461864	2006 HP_{80}	—	April 26, 2006	Kitt Peak	Spacewatch	·	520 m	MPC · JPL
461865	2006 HM_{83}	—	April 26, 2006	Kitt Peak	Spacewatch	·	1.5 km	MPC · JPL
461866	2006 HA_{94}	—	April 29, 2006	Kitt Peak	Spacewatch	·	3.2 km	MPC · JPL
461867	2006 HT_{95}	—	April 30, 2006	Kitt Peak	Spacewatch	·	650 m	MPC · JPL
461868	2006 HV_{95}	—	April 30, 2006	Kitt Peak	Spacewatch	THM	1.8 km	MPC · JPL
461869	2006 HA_{97}	—	April 30, 2006	Kitt Peak	Spacewatch	VER	2.3 km	MPC · JPL
461870	2006 HQ_{104}	—	April 30, 2006	Kitt Peak	Spacewatch	·	3.3 km	MPC · JPL
461871	2006 HU_{106}	—	April 30, 2006	Kitt Peak	Spacewatch	·	1.8 km	MPC · JPL
461872	2006 HY_{152}	—	April 26, 2006	Kitt Peak	Spacewatch	·	510 m	MPC · JPL
461873	2006 JZ_{4}	—	March 27, 2006	Siding Spring	SSS	PHO	1.3 km	MPC · JPL
461874	2006 JP_{9}	—	May 1, 2006	Kitt Peak	Spacewatch	·	640 m	MPC · JPL
461875	2006 JE_{11}	—	May 1, 2006	Kitt Peak	Spacewatch	EOS	1.7 km	MPC · JPL
461876	2006 JM_{22}	—	May 2, 2006	Kitt Peak	Spacewatch	H	570 m	MPC · JPL
461877	2006 JT_{32}	—	April 21, 2006	Kitt Peak	Spacewatch	·	2.1 km	MPC · JPL
461878	2006 JB_{34}	—	April 24, 2006	Mount Lemmon	Mount Lemmon Survey	·	610 m	MPC · JPL
461879	2006 JM_{39}	—	April 26, 2006	Mount Lemmon	Mount Lemmon Survey	·	2.2 km	MPC · JPL
461880	2006 JB_{43}	—	May 2, 2006	Kitt Peak	Spacewatch	·	2.7 km	MPC · JPL
461881	2006 JQ_{48}	—	May 8, 2006	Kitt Peak	Spacewatch	·	3.3 km	MPC · JPL
461882	2006 JY_{53}	—	May 7, 2006	Mount Lemmon	Mount Lemmon Survey	·	650 m	MPC · JPL
461883	2006 KP_{3}	—	March 25, 2006	Kitt Peak	Spacewatch	·	660 m	MPC · JPL
461884	2006 KO_{7}	—	May 9, 2006	Mount Lemmon	Mount Lemmon Survey	·	2.2 km	MPC · JPL
461885	2006 KE_{8}	—	May 19, 2006	Mount Lemmon	Mount Lemmon Survey	·	690 m	MPC · JPL
461886	2006 KT_{15}	—	May 20, 2006	Kitt Peak	Spacewatch	·	2.8 km	MPC · JPL
461887	2006 KB_{30}	—	May 7, 2006	Mount Lemmon	Mount Lemmon Survey	·	540 m	MPC · JPL
461888	2006 KJ_{30}	—	May 20, 2006	Kitt Peak	Spacewatch	·	560 m	MPC · JPL
461889	2006 KA_{31}	—	May 5, 2006	Kitt Peak	Spacewatch	·	1.6 km	MPC · JPL
461890	2006 KR_{32}	—	May 20, 2006	Kitt Peak	Spacewatch	·	2.0 km	MPC · JPL
461891	2006 KV_{33}	—	May 20, 2006	Kitt Peak	Spacewatch	·	4.4 km	MPC · JPL
461892	2006 KG_{67}	—	May 8, 2006	Mount Lemmon	Mount Lemmon Survey	·	700 m	MPC · JPL
461893	2006 KD_{73}	—	May 23, 2006	Kitt Peak	Spacewatch	EOS	1.6 km	MPC · JPL
461894	2006 KN_{88}	—	May 24, 2006	Kitt Peak	Spacewatch	·	2.7 km	MPC · JPL
461895	2006 KU_{89}	—	May 29, 2006	Socorro	LINEAR	·	3.0 km	MPC · JPL
461896	2006 KM_{90}	—	May 24, 2006	Mount Lemmon	Mount Lemmon Survey	·	820 m	MPC · JPL
461897	2006 KG_{93}	—	May 25, 2006	Kitt Peak	Spacewatch	·	690 m	MPC · JPL
461898	2006 KR_{96}	—	May 25, 2006	Kitt Peak	Spacewatch	·	3.1 km	MPC · JPL
461899	2006 LN_{6}	—	June 4, 2006	Mount Lemmon	Mount Lemmon Survey	·	2.9 km	MPC · JPL
461900	2006 MX_{11}	—	May 8, 2006	Mount Lemmon	Mount Lemmon Survey	·	3.0 km	MPC · JPL

== 461901–462000 ==
back to top

Designation			Discovery			Properties		Ref
Permanent	Provisional	Named after	Date	Site	Discoverer(s)	Category	Diam.	Ref
461901	2006 OR_{5}	—	July 22, 2006	Mount Lemmon	Mount Lemmon Survey	·	1.3 km	MPC · JPL
461902	2006 OT_{13}	—	July 25, 2006	Palomar	NEAT	NYS	1.1 km	MPC · JPL
461903	2006 PL_{11}	—	August 13, 2006	Palomar	NEAT	MAS	620 m	MPC · JPL
461904	2006 PG_{20}	—	August 14, 2006	Siding Spring	SSS	·	3.7 km	MPC · JPL
461905	2006 PL_{22}	—	August 15, 2006	Lulin	Lin, C.-S., Q. Ye	·	1.2 km	MPC · JPL
461906	2006 PK_{24}	—	August 12, 2006	Palomar	NEAT	·	1.2 km	MPC · JPL
461907	2006 QF_{2}	—	August 17, 2006	Palomar	NEAT	·	1.2 km	MPC · JPL
461908	2006 QW_{27}	—	August 20, 2006	Palomar	NEAT	H	570 m	MPC · JPL
461909	2006 QL_{53}	—	August 25, 2006	Socorro	LINEAR	·	1.2 km	MPC · JPL
461910	2006 QX_{95}	—	August 16, 2006	Palomar	NEAT	·	2.8 km	MPC · JPL
461911	2006 QS_{123}	—	August 28, 2006	Catalina	CSS	·	1.2 km	MPC · JPL
461912	2006 RG_{2}	—	September 14, 2006	Catalina	CSS	APO	760 m	MPC · JPL
461913	2006 RQ_{20}	—	July 21, 2006	Mount Lemmon	Mount Lemmon Survey	·	920 m	MPC · JPL
461914	2006 RD_{38}	—	September 12, 2006	Catalina	CSS	·	2.9 km	MPC · JPL
461915	2006 RM_{59}	—	September 15, 2006	Kitt Peak	Spacewatch	H	490 m	MPC · JPL
461916	2006 RX_{72}	—	September 15, 2006	Kitt Peak	Spacewatch	·	1.0 km	MPC · JPL
461917	2006 RX_{97}	—	September 15, 2006	Kitt Peak	Spacewatch	H	440 m	MPC · JPL
461918	2006 RJ_{108}	—	September 14, 2006	Mauna Kea	Masiero, J.	·	350 m	MPC · JPL
461919	2006 SR_{1}	—	September 16, 2006	Kitt Peak	Spacewatch	·	1.1 km	MPC · JPL
461920	2006 SD_{18}	—	September 17, 2006	Kitt Peak	Spacewatch	·	740 m	MPC · JPL
461921	2006 ST_{25}	—	September 16, 2006	Anderson Mesa	LONEOS	·	970 m	MPC · JPL
461922	2006 SF_{29}	—	September 17, 2006	Kitt Peak	Spacewatch	V	610 m	MPC · JPL
461923	2006 SS_{56}	—	July 28, 2006	Siding Spring	SSS	·	4.3 km	MPC · JPL
461924	2006 ST_{65}	—	September 19, 2006	Kitt Peak	Spacewatch	·	3.3 km	MPC · JPL
461925	2006 SM_{100}	—	September 19, 2006	Kitt Peak	Spacewatch	·	1.1 km	MPC · JPL
461926	2006 SA_{143}	—	September 19, 2006	Kitt Peak	Spacewatch	·	1.3 km	MPC · JPL
461927	2006 SA_{149}	—	September 19, 2006	Kitt Peak	Spacewatch	·	1.6 km	MPC · JPL
461928	2006 SF_{149}	—	September 19, 2006	Kitt Peak	Spacewatch	·	810 m	MPC · JPL
461929	2006 SB_{157}	—	September 23, 2006	Kitt Peak	Spacewatch	MAS	520 m	MPC · JPL
461930	2006 SA_{160}	—	September 23, 2006	Kitt Peak	Spacewatch	·	1.2 km	MPC · JPL
461931	2006 SY_{161}	—	September 24, 2006	Kitt Peak	Spacewatch	·	1.0 km	MPC · JPL
461932	2006 SG_{163}	—	September 24, 2006	Kitt Peak	Spacewatch	(5)	890 m	MPC · JPL
461933	2006 SC_{174}	—	March 8, 2005	Mount Lemmon	Mount Lemmon Survey	MAS	710 m	MPC · JPL
461934	2006 SS_{211}	—	September 18, 2006	Catalina	CSS	·	970 m	MPC · JPL
461935	2006 SQ_{214}	—	September 27, 2006	Socorro	LINEAR	H	570 m	MPC · JPL
461936	2006 SP_{215}	—	September 17, 2006	Kitt Peak	Spacewatch	·	860 m	MPC · JPL
461937	2006 SW_{247}	—	August 29, 2006	Catalina	CSS	H	540 m	MPC · JPL
461938	2006 ST_{252}	—	September 26, 2006	Kitt Peak	Spacewatch	·	2.7 km	MPC · JPL
461939	2006 SM_{275}	—	September 27, 2006	Mount Lemmon	Mount Lemmon Survey	·	1.1 km	MPC · JPL
461940	2006 SH_{286}	—	September 19, 2006	Catalina	CSS	·	5.3 km	MPC · JPL
461941	2006 SA_{299}	—	September 26, 2006	Kitt Peak	Spacewatch	·	830 m	MPC · JPL
461942	2006 SX_{314}	—	September 17, 2006	Kitt Peak	Spacewatch	(5)	930 m	MPC · JPL
461943	2006 SM_{326}	—	September 27, 2006	Kitt Peak	Spacewatch	·	820 m	MPC · JPL
461944	2006 SR_{365}	—	September 30, 2006	Mount Lemmon	Mount Lemmon Survey	·	1.2 km	MPC · JPL
461945	2006 SX_{365}	—	September 30, 2006	Mount Lemmon	Mount Lemmon Survey	·	910 m	MPC · JPL
461946	2006 SF_{393}	—	September 28, 2006	Mount Lemmon	Mount Lemmon Survey	·	1.3 km	MPC · JPL
461947	2006 SO_{402}	—	September 25, 2006	Mount Lemmon	Mount Lemmon Survey	·	1.4 km	MPC · JPL
461948	2006 SQ_{402}	—	September 25, 2006	Mount Lemmon	Mount Lemmon Survey	·	1.3 km	MPC · JPL
461949	2006 TM_{5}	—	October 2, 2006	Mount Lemmon	Mount Lemmon Survey	·	790 m	MPC · JPL
461950	2006 TP_{9}	—	October 13, 2006	Eskridge	Farpoint	·	3.2 km	MPC · JPL
461951	2006 TT_{24}	—	October 12, 2006	Kitt Peak	Spacewatch	·	1.1 km	MPC · JPL
461952	2006 TC_{43}	—	October 12, 2006	Kitt Peak	Spacewatch	·	1.2 km	MPC · JPL
461953	2006 TY_{49}	—	October 12, 2006	Palomar	NEAT	·	1.4 km	MPC · JPL
461954	2006 TP_{79}	—	October 13, 2006	Kitt Peak	Spacewatch	(5)	910 m	MPC · JPL
461955	2006 TV_{87}	—	October 13, 2006	Kitt Peak	Spacewatch	·	1.2 km	MPC · JPL
461956	2006 TO_{90}	—	October 13, 2006	Kitt Peak	Spacewatch	(5)	1.1 km	MPC · JPL
461957	2006 UY_{28}	—	September 26, 2006	Mount Lemmon	Mount Lemmon Survey	·	1.1 km	MPC · JPL
461958	2006 UW_{51}	—	September 28, 2006	Mount Lemmon	Mount Lemmon Survey	PHO	1 km	MPC · JPL
461959	2006 UV_{53}	—	September 27, 2006	Mount Lemmon	Mount Lemmon Survey	·	1 km	MPC · JPL
461960	2006 UR_{61}	—	October 19, 2006	Catalina	CSS	MAR	1.4 km	MPC · JPL
461961	2006 UO_{62}	—	October 19, 2006	Kitt Peak	Spacewatch	·	1.2 km	MPC · JPL
461962	2006 UF_{64}	—	October 23, 2006	Socorro	LINEAR	·	1.4 km	MPC · JPL
461963	2006 UK_{84}	—	September 28, 2006	Mount Lemmon	Mount Lemmon Survey	·	1.0 km	MPC · JPL
461964	2006 UB_{107}	—	September 30, 2006	Mount Lemmon	Mount Lemmon Survey	·	1.5 km	MPC · JPL
461965	2006 UQ_{111}	—	October 11, 2006	Kitt Peak	Spacewatch	·	1.0 km	MPC · JPL
461966	2006 UQ_{122}	—	October 19, 2006	Kitt Peak	Spacewatch	(5)	760 m	MPC · JPL
461967	2006 UR_{129}	—	September 27, 2006	Mount Lemmon	Mount Lemmon Survey	·	940 m	MPC · JPL
461968	2006 UJ_{148}	—	September 30, 2006	Mount Lemmon	Mount Lemmon Survey	·	1.0 km	MPC · JPL
461969	2006 UD_{159}	—	September 19, 2006	Kitt Peak	Spacewatch	(5)	950 m	MPC · JPL
461970	2006 UU_{165}	—	October 21, 2006	Mount Lemmon	Mount Lemmon Survey	·	1.2 km	MPC · JPL
461971	2006 UF_{201}	—	October 21, 2006	Kitt Peak	Spacewatch	·	830 m	MPC · JPL
461972	2006 UG_{235}	—	October 23, 2006	Kitt Peak	Spacewatch	·	1.1 km	MPC · JPL
461973	2006 UA_{252}	—	October 27, 2006	Mount Lemmon	Mount Lemmon Survey	·	1.2 km	MPC · JPL
461974	2006 UA_{330}	—	October 16, 2006	Apache Point	A. C. Becker	·	2.7 km	MPC · JPL
461975	2006 UD_{334}	—	October 16, 2006	Kitt Peak	Spacewatch	·	760 m	MPC · JPL
461976	2006 UQ_{345}	—	October 23, 2006	Mount Lemmon	Mount Lemmon Survey	·	1.9 km	MPC · JPL
461977	2006 VD_{31}	—	September 28, 2006	Mount Lemmon	Mount Lemmon Survey	·	1.0 km	MPC · JPL
461978	2006 VG_{61}	—	September 27, 2006	Mount Lemmon	Mount Lemmon Survey	·	1.0 km	MPC · JPL
461979	2006 VH_{71}	—	September 28, 2006	Mount Lemmon	Mount Lemmon Survey	·	790 m	MPC · JPL
461980	2006 VG_{78}	—	October 23, 2006	Mount Lemmon	Mount Lemmon Survey	·	1.3 km	MPC · JPL
461981 Chuyouhua	2006 VO_{81}	Chuyouhua	November 12, 2006	Lulin	H.-C. Lin, Q. Ye	·	1.1 km	MPC · JPL
461982	2006 VQ_{111}	—	November 13, 2006	Kitt Peak	Spacewatch	·	1.2 km	MPC · JPL
461983	2006 VW_{116}	—	October 4, 2006	Mount Lemmon	Mount Lemmon Survey	BRG	1.2 km	MPC · JPL
461984	2006 VP_{124}	—	October 20, 2006	Mount Lemmon	Mount Lemmon Survey	·	1.5 km	MPC · JPL
461985	2006 VL_{151}	—	November 9, 2006	Palomar	NEAT	·	1.0 km	MPC · JPL
461986	2006 VN_{169}	—	November 11, 2006	Kitt Peak	Spacewatch	·	1.0 km	MPC · JPL
461987	2006 VZ_{169}	—	November 11, 2006	Kitt Peak	Spacewatch	·	930 m	MPC · JPL
461988	2006 WK	—	September 27, 2006	Mount Lemmon	Mount Lemmon Survey	EUN	1.4 km	MPC · JPL
461989	2006 WZ_{35}	—	October 23, 2006	Mount Lemmon	Mount Lemmon Survey	·	950 m	MPC · JPL
461990	2006 WM_{41}	—	November 16, 2006	Kitt Peak	Spacewatch	(5)	1.0 km	MPC · JPL
461991	2006 WR_{42}	—	November 16, 2006	Kitt Peak	Spacewatch	·	1.0 km	MPC · JPL
461992	2006 WD_{55}	—	November 16, 2006	Kitt Peak	Spacewatch	·	2.7 km	MPC · JPL
461993	2006 WA_{94}	—	October 22, 2006	Mount Lemmon	Mount Lemmon Survey	·	940 m	MPC · JPL
461994	2006 WJ_{95}	—	September 28, 2006	Mount Lemmon	Mount Lemmon Survey	·	960 m	MPC · JPL
461995	2006 WA_{109}	—	November 19, 2006	Kitt Peak	Spacewatch	·	1.3 km	MPC · JPL
461996	2006 WB_{112}	—	November 19, 2006	Kitt Peak	Spacewatch	(5)	1.2 km	MPC · JPL
461997	2006 WS_{130}	—	October 11, 2006	Siding Spring	SSS	H	830 m	MPC · JPL
461998	2006 WW_{139}	—	November 11, 2006	Kitt Peak	Spacewatch	·	1.5 km	MPC · JPL
461999	2006 WM_{143}	—	November 20, 2006	Kitt Peak	Spacewatch	·	990 m	MPC · JPL
462000	2006 WM_{146}	—	November 10, 2006	Kitt Peak	Spacewatch	·	1.6 km	MPC · JPL

back to top

== Meaning of names ==
As minor planet discoveries are confirmed, they are given a permanent number by the IAU's Minor Planet Center (MPC), and the discoverers can then submit names for them, following the IAU's naming conventions. The list below concerns those minor planets in the specified number-range that have received names, and explains the meanings of those names.

Official naming citations of newly named small Solar System bodies are approved and published in a bulletin by IAU's Working Group for Small Bodies Nomenclature (WGSBN). Before May 2021, citations were published in MPC's Minor Planet Circulars for many decades. Recent citations can also be found on the JPL Small-Body Database (SBDB). Until his death in 2016, German astronomer Lutz D. Schmadel compiled these citations into the Dictionary of Minor Planet Names (DMP) and regularly updated the collection.

Based on Paul Herget's The Names of the Minor Planets, Schmadel also researched the unclear origin of numerous asteroids, most of which had been named prior to World War II. This article incorporates text from this source, which is in the public domain: SBDB New namings may only be added to this list below after official publication as the preannouncement of names is condemned. The WGSBN publishes a comprehensive guideline for the naming rules of non-cometary small Solar System bodies.

Named minor planet	Provisional	This minor planet was named for...	Ref · Catalog
461650 Paisdezső	2005 GP_{9}	Dezső Pais (1886–1973) was a prominent figure of Hungarian historical linguistics. His special fields were phonology, lexicology, and cultural history, the study of personal names and toponomy. He was the initiator of studies concerning the history of standard Hungarian.	IAU · 461650
461981 Chuyouhua	2006 VO_{81}	You-Hua Chu (born 1953) is an astronomer, and was director of Academia Sinica's Institute of Astronomy and Astrophysics in Taiwan from 2014 to 2020.	IAU · 461981
