= Meanings of minor-planet names: 141001–142000 =

As minor planet discoveries are confirmed, they are given a permanent number by the IAU's Minor Planet Center (MPC), and the discoverers can then submit names for them, following the IAU's naming conventions. The list below concerns those minor planets in the specified number-range that have received names, and explains the meanings of those names.

Official naming citations of newly named small Solar System bodies are approved and published in a bulletin by IAU's Working Group for Small Bodies Nomenclature (WGSBN). Before May 2021, citations were published in MPC's Minor Planet Circulars for many decades. Recent citations can also be found on the JPL Small-Body Database (SBDB). Until his death in 2016, German astronomer Lutz D. Schmadel compiled these citations into the Dictionary of Minor Planet Names (DMP) and regularly updated the collection.

Based on Paul Herget's The Names of the Minor Planets, Schmadel also researched the unclear origin of numerous asteroids, most of which had been named prior to World War II. This article incorporates text from this source, which is in the public domain: SBDB New namings may only be added to this list below after official publication as the preannouncement of names is condemned. The WGSBN publishes a comprehensive guideline for the naming rules of non-cometary small Solar System bodies.

== 141001–141100 ==
Named minor planet	Provisional	This minor planet was named for...	Ref · Catalog
There are no named minor planets in this number range

== 141101–141200 ==
back to top

Named minor planet	Provisional	This minor planet was named for...	Ref · Catalog
141128 Ghyoot	2001 XR_{88}	Herman Ghyoot (born 1941), founder and first president of the Public Observatory Beisbroek (Volkssterrenwacht vzw Beisbroek; Observatoire de Beisbroek) in Bruges, Belgium (also see 121313 Tamsin).	IAU · 141128

== 141201–141300 ==
back to top

Named minor planet	Provisional	This minor planet was named for...	Ref · Catalog
There are no named minor planets in this number range

== 141301–141400 ==
back to top

Named minor planet	Provisional	This minor planet was named for...	Ref · Catalog
There are no named minor planets in this number range

== 141401–141500 ==
back to top

Named minor planet	Provisional	This minor planet was named for...	Ref · Catalog
141414 Bochanski	2002 AK_{205}	John Bochanski (born 1980), an American astronomer with the Sloan Digital Sky Survey, is known for his research on the luminosity function of low-mass stars and the structure of the Milky Way.	JPL · 141414
141496 Bartkevicius	2002 ED_{13}	Antanas Bartkevičius (born 1940), Lithuanian astronomer and professor in astronomy at the Vilnius Pedagogical University	JPL · 141496

== 141501–141600 ==
back to top

Named minor planet	Provisional	This minor planet was named for...	Ref · Catalog
There are no named minor planets in this number range

== 141601–141700 ==
back to top

Named minor planet	Provisional	This minor planet was named for...	Ref · Catalog
There are no named minor planets in this number range

== 141701–141800 ==
back to top

Named minor planet	Provisional	This minor planet was named for...	Ref · Catalog
141772 Lucapeyron	2002 NM_{5}	Luca G. Peyron, Italian priest, professor of theology and scientific journalist.	IAU · 141772

== 141801–141900 ==
back to top

Named minor planet	Provisional	This minor planet was named for...	Ref · Catalog
There are no named minor planets in this number range

== 141901–142000 ==
back to top

Named minor planet	Provisional	This minor planet was named for...	Ref · Catalog
141995 Rossbeyer	2002 PU_{154}	Ross A. Beyer (born 1975) is an American research scientist at Ames Research Center, who was a member of the geology science team for the New Horizons mission to Pluto.	JPL · 141995

back to top

Preceded by 140,001–141,000	Meanings of minor-planet names List of minor planets: 141,001–142,000	Succeeded by 142,001–143,000
