= List of minor planets: 141001–142000 =

The following is a partial list of minor planets, running from minor-planet number 141001 through 142000, inclusive. The primary data for this and other partial lists is based on JPL's "Small-Body Orbital Elements" and data available from the Minor Planet Center. Critical list information is also provided by the MPC, unless otherwise specified from Lowell Observatory. A detailed description of the table's columns and additional sources are given on the main page including a complete list of every page in this series, and a statistical break-up on the dynamical classification of minor planets.

Also see the summary list of all named bodies in numerical and alphabetical order, and the corresponding naming citations for the number range of this particular list. New namings may only be added to this list after official publication, as the preannouncement of names is condemned by the Working Group for Small Bodies Nomenclature of the International Astronomical Union.

| Near-Earth obj. | MBA (inner) | MBA (outer) | Centaur |
| Mars-crosser | MBA (middle) | Jupiter trojan | Trans-Neptunian obj. |
| Unclassified |

== 141001–141100 ==
| Designation | | | Discovery | | | Properties | | Ref |
| Permanent | Provisional | Named after | Date | Site | Discoverer(s) | Category | Diam. | Ref |
|---|---|---|---|---|---|---|---|---|
| 141001 | 2001 WX_{30} | — | November 17, 2001 | Socorro | LINEAR | · | 3.5 km | MPC · JPL |
| 141002 | 2001 WY_{30} | — | November 17, 2001 | Socorro | LINEAR | · | 8.2 km | MPC · JPL |
| 141003 | 2001 WL_{31} | — | November 17, 2001 | Socorro | LINEAR | · | 3.0 km | MPC · JPL |
| 141004 | 2001 WR_{31} | — | November 17, 2001 | Socorro | LINEAR | EOS | 3.3 km | MPC · JPL |
| 141005 | 2001 WP_{32} | — | November 17, 2001 | Socorro | LINEAR | KOR | 2.6 km | MPC · JPL |
| 141006 | 2001 WS_{32} | — | November 17, 2001 | Socorro | LINEAR | (5) | 2.8 km | MPC · JPL |
| 141007 | 2001 WD_{33} | — | November 17, 2001 | Socorro | LINEAR | · | 2.5 km | MPC · JPL |
| 141008 | 2001 WA_{34} | — | November 17, 2001 | Socorro | LINEAR | · | 2.2 km | MPC · JPL |
| 141009 | 2001 WQ_{34} | — | November 17, 2001 | Socorro | LINEAR | TEL | 2.8 km | MPC · JPL |
| 141010 | 2001 WT_{35} | — | November 17, 2001 | Socorro | LINEAR | · | 3.9 km | MPC · JPL |
| 141011 | 2001 WN_{38} | — | November 17, 2001 | Socorro | LINEAR | · | 4.8 km | MPC · JPL |
| 141012 | 2001 WD_{42} | — | November 18, 2001 | Socorro | LINEAR | KOR | 2.0 km | MPC · JPL |
| 141013 | 2001 WO_{43} | — | November 18, 2001 | Socorro | LINEAR | URS | 5.8 km | MPC · JPL |
| 141014 | 2001 WJ_{44} | — | November 18, 2001 | Socorro | LINEAR | · | 2.5 km | MPC · JPL |
| 141015 | 2001 WT_{44} | — | November 18, 2001 | Socorro | LINEAR | · | 3.2 km | MPC · JPL |
| 141016 | 2001 WS_{45} | — | November 19, 2001 | Socorro | LINEAR | · | 5.2 km | MPC · JPL |
| 141017 | 2001 WY_{45} | — | November 19, 2001 | Socorro | LINEAR | · | 4.2 km | MPC · JPL |
| 141018 | 2001 WC_{47} | — | November 20, 2001 | Socorro | LINEAR | AMO | 550 m | MPC · JPL |
| 141019 | 2001 WX_{47} | — | November 19, 2001 | Anderson Mesa | LONEOS | · | 2.3 km | MPC · JPL |
| 141020 | 2001 WY_{50} | — | November 18, 2001 | Socorro | LINEAR | · | 4.5 km | MPC · JPL |
| 141021 | 2001 WQ_{51} | — | November 19, 2001 | Socorro | LINEAR | KOR | 2.5 km | MPC · JPL |
| 141022 | 2001 WS_{51} | — | November 19, 2001 | Socorro | LINEAR | · | 3.6 km | MPC · JPL |
| 141023 | 2001 WV_{51} | — | November 19, 2001 | Socorro | LINEAR | KOR | 2.0 km | MPC · JPL |
| 141024 | 2001 WA_{52} | — | November 19, 2001 | Socorro | LINEAR | · | 5.6 km | MPC · JPL |
| 141025 | 2001 WR_{52} | — | November 19, 2001 | Socorro | LINEAR | TIR | 5.2 km | MPC · JPL |
| 141026 | 2001 WH_{55} | — | November 19, 2001 | Socorro | LINEAR | · | 3.0 km | MPC · JPL |
| 141027 | 2001 WR_{55} | — | November 19, 2001 | Socorro | LINEAR | · | 2.9 km | MPC · JPL |
| 141028 | 2001 WG_{58} | — | November 19, 2001 | Socorro | LINEAR | · | 2.9 km | MPC · JPL |
| 141029 | 2001 WD_{59} | — | November 19, 2001 | Socorro | LINEAR | KOR | 1.9 km | MPC · JPL |
| 141030 | 2001 WN_{59} | — | November 19, 2001 | Socorro | LINEAR | · | 6.9 km | MPC · JPL |
| 141031 | 2001 WT_{60} | — | November 19, 2001 | Socorro | LINEAR | · | 4.4 km | MPC · JPL |
| 141032 | 2001 WG_{62} | — | November 19, 2001 | Socorro | LINEAR | · | 6.4 km | MPC · JPL |
| 141033 | 2001 WS_{63} | — | November 19, 2001 | Socorro | LINEAR | · | 2.8 km | MPC · JPL |
| 141034 | 2001 WJ_{66} | — | November 20, 2001 | Socorro | LINEAR | · | 3.4 km | MPC · JPL |
| 141035 | 2001 WS_{66} | — | November 20, 2001 | Socorro | LINEAR | HYG | 3.9 km | MPC · JPL |
| 141036 | 2001 WU_{67} | — | November 20, 2001 | Socorro | LINEAR | · | 2.8 km | MPC · JPL |
| 141037 | 2001 WZ_{70} | — | November 20, 2001 | Socorro | LINEAR | · | 4.0 km | MPC · JPL |
| 141038 | 2001 WW_{72} | — | November 20, 2001 | Socorro | LINEAR | · | 3.5 km | MPC · JPL |
| 141039 | 2001 WO_{73} | — | November 20, 2001 | Socorro | LINEAR | KOR | 2.0 km | MPC · JPL |
| 141040 | 2001 WM_{75} | — | November 20, 2001 | Socorro | LINEAR | EOS | 3.3 km | MPC · JPL |
| 141041 | 2001 WW_{75} | — | November 20, 2001 | Socorro | LINEAR | · | 2.7 km | MPC · JPL |
| 141042 | 2001 WS_{76} | — | November 20, 2001 | Socorro | LINEAR | · | 5.5 km | MPC · JPL |
| 141043 | 2001 WT_{79} | — | November 20, 2001 | Socorro | LINEAR | · | 4.4 km | MPC · JPL |
| 141044 | 2001 WL_{80} | — | November 20, 2001 | Socorro | LINEAR | · | 3.2 km | MPC · JPL |
| 141045 | 2001 WE_{83} | — | November 20, 2001 | Socorro | LINEAR | · | 4.1 km | MPC · JPL |
| 141046 | 2001 WR_{89} | — | November 20, 2001 | Socorro | LINEAR | LIX | 5.7 km | MPC · JPL |
| 141047 | 2001 WY_{90} | — | November 21, 2001 | Socorro | LINEAR | · | 3.2 km | MPC · JPL |
| 141048 | 2001 WR_{91} | — | November 21, 2001 | Socorro | LINEAR | · | 5.7 km | MPC · JPL |
| 141049 | 2001 WM_{97} | — | November 18, 2001 | Socorro | LINEAR | · | 5.8 km | MPC · JPL |
| 141050 | 2001 WN_{99} | — | November 18, 2001 | Socorro | LINEAR | · | 4.9 km | MPC · JPL |
| 141051 | 2001 WW_{101} | — | November 18, 2001 | Kitt Peak | Spacewatch | THM | 4.1 km | MPC · JPL |
| 141052 | 2001 XR_{1} | — | December 9, 2001 | Socorro | LINEAR | APO +1km | 1.1 km | MPC · JPL |
| 141053 | 2001 XT_{1} | — | December 9, 2001 | Socorro | LINEAR | APO · PHA | 600 m | MPC · JPL |
| 141054 | 2001 XW_{2} | — | December 8, 2001 | Socorro | LINEAR | H | 1.2 km | MPC · JPL |
| 141055 | 2001 XT_{3} | — | December 9, 2001 | Socorro | LINEAR | H | 1.2 km | MPC · JPL |
| 141056 | 2001 XV_{4} | — | December 9, 2001 | Socorro | LINEAR | AMO · APO +1km | 1.2 km | MPC · JPL |
| 141057 | 2001 XS_{5} | — | December 7, 2001 | Socorro | LINEAR | · | 5.1 km | MPC · JPL |
| 141058 | 2001 XE_{6} | — | December 7, 2001 | Socorro | LINEAR | THM | 4.2 km | MPC · JPL |
| 141059 | 2001 XQ_{6} | — | December 8, 2001 | Socorro | LINEAR | · | 4.6 km | MPC · JPL |
| 141060 | 2001 XB_{7} | — | December 7, 2001 | Socorro | LINEAR | · | 5.0 km | MPC · JPL |
| 141061 | 2001 XN_{9} | — | December 9, 2001 | Socorro | LINEAR | HYG | 4.8 km | MPC · JPL |
| 141062 | 2001 XS_{10} | — | December 10, 2001 | Kitt Peak | Spacewatch | · | 3.0 km | MPC · JPL |
| 141063 | 2001 XZ_{11} | — | December 9, 2001 | Socorro | LINEAR | · | 4.2 km | MPC · JPL |
| 141064 | 2001 XD_{12} | — | December 9, 2001 | Socorro | LINEAR | H | 1.4 km | MPC · JPL |
| 141065 | 2001 XS_{12} | — | December 9, 2001 | Socorro | LINEAR | EOS | 3.0 km | MPC · JPL |
| 141066 | 2001 XF_{13} | — | December 9, 2001 | Socorro | LINEAR | · | 5.9 km | MPC · JPL |
| 141067 | 2001 XV_{13} | — | December 9, 2001 | Socorro | LINEAR | TEL | 2.7 km | MPC · JPL |
| 141068 | 2001 XR_{14} | — | December 9, 2001 | Socorro | LINEAR | · | 8.1 km | MPC · JPL |
| 141069 | 2001 XX_{14} | — | December 9, 2001 | Socorro | LINEAR | · | 6.4 km | MPC · JPL |
| 141070 | 2001 XN_{15} | — | December 10, 2001 | Socorro | LINEAR | · | 6.8 km | MPC · JPL |
| 141071 | 2001 XM_{17} | — | December 9, 2001 | Socorro | LINEAR | · | 7.5 km | MPC · JPL |
| 141072 | 2001 XF_{19} | — | December 9, 2001 | Socorro | LINEAR | · | 5.4 km | MPC · JPL |
| 141073 | 2001 XW_{21} | — | December 9, 2001 | Socorro | LINEAR | DOR | 4.0 km | MPC · JPL |
| 141074 | 2001 XA_{22} | — | December 9, 2001 | Socorro | LINEAR | · | 6.3 km | MPC · JPL |
| 141075 | 2001 XT_{22} | — | December 9, 2001 | Socorro | LINEAR | EOS | 3.6 km | MPC · JPL |
| 141076 | 2001 XE_{25} | — | December 10, 2001 | Socorro | LINEAR | · | 6.5 km | MPC · JPL |
| 141077 | 2001 XB_{27} | — | December 10, 2001 | Socorro | LINEAR | · | 5.4 km | MPC · JPL |
| 141078 | 2001 XQ_{30} | — | December 11, 2001 | Socorro | LINEAR | AMO | 660 m | MPC · JPL |
| 141079 | 2001 XS_{30} | — | December 11, 2001 | Socorro | LINEAR | APO +1km | 1.0 km | MPC · JPL |
| 141080 | 2001 XV_{33} | — | December 7, 2001 | Socorro | LINEAR | EOS | 3.1 km | MPC · JPL |
| 141081 | 2001 XF_{34} | — | December 9, 2001 | Socorro | LINEAR | EOS | 3.2 km | MPC · JPL |
| 141082 | 2001 XT_{34} | — | December 9, 2001 | Socorro | LINEAR | · | 4.4 km | MPC · JPL |
| 141083 | 2001 XE_{35} | — | December 13, 2001 | Palomar | NEAT | EOS | 3.4 km | MPC · JPL |
| 141084 | 2001 XJ_{35} | — | December 9, 2001 | Socorro | LINEAR | · | 5.3 km | MPC · JPL |
| 141085 | 2001 XQ_{35} | — | December 9, 2001 | Socorro | LINEAR | EOS | 5.6 km | MPC · JPL |
| 141086 | 2001 XQ_{36} | — | December 9, 2001 | Socorro | LINEAR | EOS | 3.3 km | MPC · JPL |
| 141087 | 2001 XK_{37} | — | December 9, 2001 | Socorro | LINEAR | · | 5.5 km | MPC · JPL |
| 141088 | 2001 XR_{39} | — | December 9, 2001 | Socorro | LINEAR | · | 6.2 km | MPC · JPL |
| 141089 | 2001 XA_{40} | — | December 9, 2001 | Socorro | LINEAR | · | 5.1 km | MPC · JPL |
| 141090 | 2001 XJ_{42} | — | December 9, 2001 | Socorro | LINEAR | · | 8.6 km | MPC · JPL |
| 141091 | 2001 XZ_{42} | — | December 9, 2001 | Socorro | LINEAR | EUP · slow | 6.2 km | MPC · JPL |
| 141092 | 2001 XJ_{43} | — | December 9, 2001 | Socorro | LINEAR | · | 4.1 km | MPC · JPL |
| 141093 | 2001 XS_{44} | — | December 9, 2001 | Socorro | LINEAR | · | 4.5 km | MPC · JPL |
| 141094 | 2001 XL_{45} | — | December 9, 2001 | Socorro | LINEAR | VER | 6.2 km | MPC · JPL |
| 141095 | 2001 XW_{46} | — | December 9, 2001 | Socorro | LINEAR | · | 8.1 km | MPC · JPL |
| 141096 | 2001 XB_{48} | — | December 9, 2001 | Socorro | LINEAR | H | 1.1 km | MPC · JPL |
| 141097 | 2001 XN_{50} | — | December 10, 2001 | Socorro | LINEAR | URS | 6.8 km | MPC · JPL |
| 141098 | 2001 XO_{52} | — | December 10, 2001 | Socorro | LINEAR | · | 4.9 km | MPC · JPL |
| 141099 | 2001 XJ_{53} | — | December 10, 2001 | Socorro | LINEAR | · | 3.7 km | MPC · JPL |
| 141100 | 2001 XV_{53} | — | December 10, 2001 | Socorro | LINEAR | THM | 4.4 km | MPC · JPL |

== 141101–141200 ==
back to top

| Designation | | | Discovery | | | Properties | | Ref |
| Permanent | Provisional | Named after | Date | Site | Discoverer(s) | Category | Diam. | Ref |
|---|---|---|---|---|---|---|---|---|
| 141101 | 2001 XY_{53} | — | December 10, 2001 | Socorro | LINEAR | · | 5.0 km | MPC · JPL |
| 141102 | 2001 XE_{54} | — | December 10, 2001 | Socorro | LINEAR | KOR | 2.6 km | MPC · JPL |
| 141103 | 2001 XM_{56} | — | December 10, 2001 | Socorro | LINEAR | · | 2.6 km | MPC · JPL |
| 141104 | 2001 XB_{57} | — | December 10, 2001 | Socorro | LINEAR | · | 4.2 km | MPC · JPL |
| 141105 | 2001 XK_{57} | — | December 10, 2001 | Socorro | LINEAR | · | 6.2 km | MPC · JPL |
| 141106 | 2001 XP_{57} | — | December 10, 2001 | Socorro | LINEAR | · | 7.6 km | MPC · JPL |
| 141107 | 2001 XF_{58} | — | December 10, 2001 | Socorro | LINEAR | · | 5.0 km | MPC · JPL |
| 141108 | 2001 XG_{58} | — | December 10, 2001 | Socorro | LINEAR | THM | 4.3 km | MPC · JPL |
| 141109 | 2001 XZ_{59} | — | December 10, 2001 | Socorro | LINEAR | · | 5.5 km | MPC · JPL |
| 141110 | 2001 XY_{62} | — | December 10, 2001 | Socorro | LINEAR | · | 3.7 km | MPC · JPL |
| 141111 | 2001 XR_{64} | — | December 10, 2001 | Socorro | LINEAR | · | 3.5 km | MPC · JPL |
| 141112 | 2001 XV_{65} | — | December 10, 2001 | Socorro | LINEAR | · | 4.5 km | MPC · JPL |
| 141113 | 2001 XN_{69} | — | December 11, 2001 | Socorro | LINEAR | · | 2.8 km | MPC · JPL |
| 141114 | 2001 XX_{72} | — | December 11, 2001 | Socorro | LINEAR | · | 4.3 km | MPC · JPL |
| 141115 | 2001 XO_{73} | — | December 11, 2001 | Socorro | LINEAR | · | 4.1 km | MPC · JPL |
| 141116 | 2001 XU_{73} | — | December 11, 2001 | Socorro | LINEAR | MRX | 1.9 km | MPC · JPL |
| 141117 | 2001 XJ_{80} | — | December 11, 2001 | Socorro | LINEAR | · | 4.1 km | MPC · JPL |
| 141118 | 2001 XW_{80} | — | December 11, 2001 | Socorro | LINEAR | · | 4.9 km | MPC · JPL |
| 141119 | 2001 XQ_{81} | — | December 11, 2001 | Socorro | LINEAR | · | 4.7 km | MPC · JPL |
| 141120 | 2001 XT_{81} | — | December 11, 2001 | Socorro | LINEAR | · | 2.7 km | MPC · JPL |
| 141121 | 2001 XB_{82} | — | December 11, 2001 | Socorro | LINEAR | · | 2.3 km | MPC · JPL |
| 141122 | 2001 XC_{82} | — | December 11, 2001 | Socorro | LINEAR | · | 5.7 km | MPC · JPL |
| 141123 | 2001 XM_{82} | — | December 11, 2001 | Socorro | LINEAR | · | 2.6 km | MPC · JPL |
| 141124 | 2001 XU_{82} | — | December 11, 2001 | Socorro | LINEAR | · | 1.5 km | MPC · JPL |
| 141125 | 2001 XJ_{83} | — | December 11, 2001 | Socorro | LINEAR | · | 5.2 km | MPC · JPL |
| 141126 | 2001 XT_{83} | — | December 11, 2001 | Socorro | LINEAR | HYG | 4.7 km | MPC · JPL |
| 141127 | 2001 XC_{85} | — | December 11, 2001 | Socorro | LINEAR | · | 5.9 km | MPC · JPL |
| 141128 Ghyoot | 2001 XR_{88} | Ghyoot | December 10, 2001 | Uccle | T. Pauwels | HYG | 4.4 km | MPC · JPL |
| 141129 | 2001 XA_{90} | — | December 10, 2001 | Socorro | LINEAR | · | 7.0 km | MPC · JPL |
| 141130 | 2001 XE_{90} | — | December 10, 2001 | Socorro | LINEAR | · | 3.4 km | MPC · JPL |
| 141131 | 2001 XG_{90} | — | December 10, 2001 | Socorro | LINEAR | V | 1.0 km | MPC · JPL |
| 141132 | 2001 XL_{91} | — | December 10, 2001 | Socorro | LINEAR | · | 5.4 km | MPC · JPL |
| 141133 | 2001 XM_{91} | — | December 10, 2001 | Socorro | LINEAR | EOS | 3.1 km | MPC · JPL |
| 141134 | 2001 XO_{91} | — | December 10, 2001 | Socorro | LINEAR | THM | 5.0 km | MPC · JPL |
| 141135 | 2001 XD_{92} | — | December 10, 2001 | Socorro | LINEAR | · | 6.1 km | MPC · JPL |
| 141136 | 2001 XX_{92} | — | December 10, 2001 | Socorro | LINEAR | · | 4.4 km | MPC · JPL |
| 141137 | 2001 XY_{93} | — | December 10, 2001 | Socorro | LINEAR | EOS | 3.2 km | MPC · JPL |
| 141138 | 2001 XC_{94} | — | December 10, 2001 | Socorro | LINEAR | · | 5.4 km | MPC · JPL |
| 141139 | 2001 XQ_{95} | — | December 10, 2001 | Socorro | LINEAR | THM | 5.0 km | MPC · JPL |
| 141140 | 2001 XZ_{95} | — | December 10, 2001 | Socorro | LINEAR | · | 3.1 km | MPC · JPL |
| 141141 | 2001 XH_{96} | — | December 10, 2001 | Socorro | LINEAR | EOS | 3.9 km | MPC · JPL |
| 141142 | 2001 XF_{97} | — | December 10, 2001 | Socorro | LINEAR | HNS | 2.8 km | MPC · JPL |
| 141143 | 2001 XL_{98} | — | December 10, 2001 | Socorro | LINEAR | EOS | 3.3 km | MPC · JPL |
| 141144 | 2001 XU_{99} | — | December 10, 2001 | Socorro | LINEAR | HYG | 5.8 km | MPC · JPL |
| 141145 | 2001 XQ_{104} | — | December 14, 2001 | Kitt Peak | Spacewatch | · | 3.6 km | MPC · JPL |
| 141146 | 2001 XU_{105} | — | December 10, 2001 | Socorro | LINEAR | · | 4.8 km | MPC · JPL |
| 141147 | 2001 XT_{106} | — | December 10, 2001 | Socorro | LINEAR | · | 4.1 km | MPC · JPL |
| 141148 | 2001 XV_{106} | — | December 10, 2001 | Socorro | LINEAR | · | 3.3 km | MPC · JPL |
| 141149 | 2001 XB_{107} | — | December 10, 2001 | Socorro | LINEAR | · | 5.5 km | MPC · JPL |
| 141150 | 2001 XK_{109} | — | December 11, 2001 | Socorro | LINEAR | · | 4.8 km | MPC · JPL |
| 141151 | 2001 XG_{110} | — | December 11, 2001 | Socorro | LINEAR | · | 4.1 km | MPC · JPL |
| 141152 | 2001 XX_{111} | — | December 11, 2001 | Socorro | LINEAR | · | 6.6 km | MPC · JPL |
| 141153 | 2001 XB_{112} | — | December 11, 2001 | Socorro | LINEAR | · | 3.2 km | MPC · JPL |
| 141154 | 2001 XZ_{113} | — | December 13, 2001 | Socorro | LINEAR | TIR | 4.2 km | MPC · JPL |
| 141155 | 2001 XN_{114} | — | December 13, 2001 | Socorro | LINEAR | · | 4.4 km | MPC · JPL |
| 141156 | 2001 XN_{116} | — | December 13, 2001 | Socorro | LINEAR | · | 3.7 km | MPC · JPL |
| 141157 | 2001 XR_{120} | — | December 14, 2001 | Socorro | LINEAR | · | 3.1 km | MPC · JPL |
| 141158 | 2001 XZ_{120} | — | December 14, 2001 | Socorro | LINEAR | · | 5.4 km | MPC · JPL |
| 141159 | 2001 XF_{122} | — | December 14, 2001 | Socorro | LINEAR | · | 2.5 km | MPC · JPL |
| 141160 | 2001 XS_{124} | — | December 14, 2001 | Socorro | LINEAR | · | 3.5 km | MPC · JPL |
| 141161 | 2001 XE_{125} | — | December 14, 2001 | Socorro | LINEAR | THM | 3.7 km | MPC · JPL |
| 141162 | 2001 XL_{127} | — | December 14, 2001 | Socorro | LINEAR | THM | 4.3 km | MPC · JPL |
| 141163 | 2001 XY_{128} | — | December 14, 2001 | Socorro | LINEAR | · | 3.9 km | MPC · JPL |
| 141164 | 2001 XH_{136} | — | December 14, 2001 | Socorro | LINEAR | · | 4.1 km | MPC · JPL |
| 141165 | 2001 XT_{139} | — | December 14, 2001 | Socorro | LINEAR | · | 5.3 km | MPC · JPL |
| 141166 | 2001 XL_{142} | — | December 14, 2001 | Socorro | LINEAR | · | 3.1 km | MPC · JPL |
| 141167 | 2001 XT_{145} | — | December 14, 2001 | Socorro | LINEAR | HYG | 4.9 km | MPC · JPL |
| 141168 | 2001 XV_{145} | — | December 14, 2001 | Socorro | LINEAR | MRX | 1.7 km | MPC · JPL |
| 141169 | 2001 XQ_{146} | — | December 14, 2001 | Socorro | LINEAR | · | 5.2 km | MPC · JPL |
| 141170 | 2001 XX_{147} | — | December 14, 2001 | Socorro | LINEAR | · | 3.3 km | MPC · JPL |
| 141171 | 2001 XT_{148} | — | December 14, 2001 | Socorro | LINEAR | · | 3.8 km | MPC · JPL |
| 141172 | 2001 XL_{150} | — | December 14, 2001 | Socorro | LINEAR | · | 2.9 km | MPC · JPL |
| 141173 | 2001 XQ_{151} | — | December 14, 2001 | Socorro | LINEAR | · | 3.0 km | MPC · JPL |
| 141174 | 2001 XS_{151} | — | December 14, 2001 | Socorro | LINEAR | fast | 3.1 km | MPC · JPL |
| 141175 | 2001 XT_{151} | — | December 14, 2001 | Socorro | LINEAR | · | 3.7 km | MPC · JPL |
| 141176 | 2001 XV_{151} | — | December 14, 2001 | Socorro | LINEAR | · | 3.4 km | MPC · JPL |
| 141177 | 2001 XD_{152} | — | December 14, 2001 | Socorro | LINEAR | · | 6.8 km | MPC · JPL |
| 141178 | 2001 XH_{153} | — | December 14, 2001 | Socorro | LINEAR | · | 4.5 km | MPC · JPL |
| 141179 | 2001 XR_{159} | — | December 14, 2001 | Socorro | LINEAR | EOS | 3.6 km | MPC · JPL |
| 141180 | 2001 XF_{160} | — | December 14, 2001 | Socorro | LINEAR | TIR · | 7.8 km | MPC · JPL |
| 141181 | 2001 XT_{168} | — | December 14, 2001 | Socorro | LINEAR | THM | 4.7 km | MPC · JPL |
| 141182 | 2001 XC_{169} | — | December 14, 2001 | Socorro | LINEAR | · | 6.4 km | MPC · JPL |
| 141183 | 2001 XP_{171} | — | December 14, 2001 | Socorro | LINEAR | · | 2.8 km | MPC · JPL |
| 141184 | 2001 XA_{173} | — | December 14, 2001 | Socorro | LINEAR | HYG | 5.2 km | MPC · JPL |
| 141185 | 2001 XB_{173} | — | December 14, 2001 | Socorro | LINEAR | · | 3.4 km | MPC · JPL |
| 141186 | 2001 XD_{175} | — | December 14, 2001 | Socorro | LINEAR | · | 3.9 km | MPC · JPL |
| 141187 | 2001 XE_{175} | — | December 14, 2001 | Socorro | LINEAR | · | 5.8 km | MPC · JPL |
| 141188 | 2001 XH_{176} | — | December 14, 2001 | Socorro | LINEAR | · | 4.5 km | MPC · JPL |
| 141189 | 2001 XV_{179} | — | December 14, 2001 | Socorro | LINEAR | VER | 5.6 km | MPC · JPL |
| 141190 | 2001 XV_{181} | — | December 14, 2001 | Socorro | LINEAR | MRX | 1.9 km | MPC · JPL |
| 141191 | 2001 XA_{182} | — | December 14, 2001 | Socorro | LINEAR | · | 4.9 km | MPC · JPL |
| 141192 | 2001 XM_{183} | — | December 14, 2001 | Socorro | LINEAR | · | 3.4 km | MPC · JPL |
| 141193 | 2001 XD_{184} | — | December 14, 2001 | Socorro | LINEAR | · | 4.8 km | MPC · JPL |
| 141194 | 2001 XE_{186} | — | December 14, 2001 | Socorro | LINEAR | · | 4.0 km | MPC · JPL |
| 141195 | 2001 XS_{188} | — | December 14, 2001 | Socorro | LINEAR | HYG | 3.8 km | MPC · JPL |
| 141196 | 2001 XX_{189} | — | December 14, 2001 | Socorro | LINEAR | · | 4.1 km | MPC · JPL |
| 141197 | 2001 XV_{192} | — | December 14, 2001 | Socorro | LINEAR | · | 2.6 km | MPC · JPL |
| 141198 | 2001 XR_{199} | — | December 14, 2001 | Socorro | LINEAR | · | 3.4 km | MPC · JPL |
| 141199 | 2001 XF_{203} | — | December 11, 2001 | Socorro | LINEAR | · | 3.6 km | MPC · JPL |
| 141200 | 2001 XP_{203} | — | December 11, 2001 | Socorro | LINEAR | · | 3.1 km | MPC · JPL |

== 141201–141300 ==
back to top

| Designation | | | Discovery | | | Properties | | Ref |
| Permanent | Provisional | Named after | Date | Site | Discoverer(s) | Category | Diam. | Ref |
|---|---|---|---|---|---|---|---|---|
| 141201 | 2001 XD_{206} | — | December 11, 2001 | Socorro | LINEAR | · | 6.3 km | MPC · JPL |
| 141202 | 2001 XV_{207} | — | December 11, 2001 | Socorro | LINEAR | · | 4.7 km | MPC · JPL |
| 141203 | 2001 XB_{208} | — | December 11, 2001 | Socorro | LINEAR | EOS | 3.2 km | MPC · JPL |
| 141204 | 2001 XJ_{208} | — | December 11, 2001 | Socorro | LINEAR | PAD | 2.7 km | MPC · JPL |
| 141205 | 2001 XP_{209} | — | December 11, 2001 | Socorro | LINEAR | EOS | 3.5 km | MPC · JPL |
| 141206 | 2001 XX_{209} | — | December 11, 2001 | Socorro | LINEAR | · | 5.5 km | MPC · JPL |
| 141207 | 2001 XF_{210} | — | December 11, 2001 | Socorro | LINEAR | · | 5.3 km | MPC · JPL |
| 141208 | 2001 XG_{212} | — | December 11, 2001 | Socorro | LINEAR | · | 5.7 km | MPC · JPL |
| 141209 | 2001 XO_{212} | — | December 11, 2001 | Socorro | LINEAR | · | 5.1 km | MPC · JPL |
| 141210 | 2001 XS_{212} | — | December 11, 2001 | Socorro | LINEAR | · | 9.4 km | MPC · JPL |
| 141211 | 2001 XJ_{218} | — | December 15, 2001 | Socorro | LINEAR | · | 4.3 km | MPC · JPL |
| 141212 | 2001 XK_{218} | — | December 15, 2001 | Socorro | LINEAR | · | 2.6 km | MPC · JPL |
| 141213 | 2001 XY_{218} | — | December 15, 2001 | Socorro | LINEAR | · | 4.0 km | MPC · JPL |
| 141214 | 2001 XC_{219} | — | December 15, 2001 | Socorro | LINEAR | KOR | 2.2 km | MPC · JPL |
| 141215 | 2001 XO_{219} | — | December 15, 2001 | Socorro | LINEAR | · | 6.9 km | MPC · JPL |
| 141216 | 2001 XC_{220} | — | December 15, 2001 | Socorro | LINEAR | EOS | 3.0 km | MPC · JPL |
| 141217 | 2001 XN_{220} | — | December 15, 2001 | Socorro | LINEAR | · | 5.1 km | MPC · JPL |
| 141218 | 2001 XV_{220} | — | December 15, 2001 | Socorro | LINEAR | · | 6.9 km | MPC · JPL |
| 141219 | 2001 XC_{221} | — | December 15, 2001 | Socorro | LINEAR | · | 3.1 km | MPC · JPL |
| 141220 | 2001 XW_{221} | — | December 15, 2001 | Socorro | LINEAR | WIT | 1.9 km | MPC · JPL |
| 141221 | 2001 XX_{223} | — | December 15, 2001 | Socorro | LINEAR | · | 4.7 km | MPC · JPL |
| 141222 | 2001 XM_{225} | — | December 15, 2001 | Socorro | LINEAR | · | 3.0 km | MPC · JPL |
| 141223 | 2001 XZ_{225} | — | December 15, 2001 | Socorro | LINEAR | · | 3.0 km | MPC · JPL |
| 141224 | 2001 XK_{226} | — | December 15, 2001 | Socorro | LINEAR | · | 3.0 km | MPC · JPL |
| 141225 | 2001 XH_{227} | — | December 15, 2001 | Socorro | LINEAR | · | 5.8 km | MPC · JPL |
| 141226 | 2001 XJ_{230} | — | December 15, 2001 | Socorro | LINEAR | THM | 3.6 km | MPC · JPL |
| 141227 | 2001 XD_{232} | — | December 15, 2001 | Socorro | LINEAR | KOR | 2.5 km | MPC · JPL |
| 141228 | 2001 XA_{233} | — | December 15, 2001 | Socorro | LINEAR | HYG | 3.6 km | MPC · JPL |
| 141229 | 2001 XE_{234} | — | December 15, 2001 | Socorro | LINEAR | · | 4.3 km | MPC · JPL |
| 141230 | 2001 XS_{234} | — | December 15, 2001 | Socorro | LINEAR | · | 3.5 km | MPC · JPL |
| 141231 | 2001 XF_{235} | — | December 15, 2001 | Socorro | LINEAR | · | 5.5 km | MPC · JPL |
| 141232 | 2001 XY_{236} | — | December 15, 2001 | Socorro | LINEAR | · | 3.0 km | MPC · JPL |
| 141233 | 2001 XC_{237} | — | December 15, 2001 | Socorro | LINEAR | · | 6.1 km | MPC · JPL |
| 141234 | 2001 XC_{245} | — | December 15, 2001 | Socorro | LINEAR | · | 4.4 km | MPC · JPL |
| 141235 | 2001 XG_{246} | — | December 15, 2001 | Socorro | LINEAR | · | 5.8 km | MPC · JPL |
| 141236 | 2001 XA_{248} | — | December 13, 2001 | Palomar | NEAT | THM | 4.1 km | MPC · JPL |
| 141237 | 2001 XE_{251} | — | December 14, 2001 | Socorro | LINEAR | fast | 2.8 km | MPC · JPL |
| 141238 | 2001 XG_{251} | — | December 14, 2001 | Socorro | LINEAR | HYG | 5.3 km | MPC · JPL |
| 141239 | 2001 XQ_{251} | — | December 14, 2001 | Socorro | LINEAR | · | 4.6 km | MPC · JPL |
| 141240 | 2001 XQ_{252} | — | December 14, 2001 | Socorro | LINEAR | THM | 3.5 km | MPC · JPL |
| 141241 | 2001 XK_{256} | — | December 7, 2001 | Socorro | LINEAR | VER | 4.8 km | MPC · JPL |
| 141242 | 2001 XV_{257} | — | December 7, 2001 | Palomar | NEAT | slow | 4.0 km | MPC · JPL |
| 141243 | 2001 XA_{258} | — | December 7, 2001 | Palomar | NEAT | · | 9.1 km | MPC · JPL |
| 141244 | 2001 XM_{259} | — | December 8, 2001 | Anderson Mesa | LONEOS | · | 6.6 km | MPC · JPL |
| 141245 | 2001 XX_{259} | — | December 9, 2001 | Anderson Mesa | LONEOS | · | 4.2 km | MPC · JPL |
| 141246 | 2001 XK_{263} | — | December 14, 2001 | Palomar | NEAT | EOS | 3.3 km | MPC · JPL |
| 141247 | 2001 XU_{263} | — | December 14, 2001 | Anderson Mesa | LONEOS | · | 3.7 km | MPC · JPL |
| 141248 | 2001 XE_{266} | — | December 9, 2001 | Socorro | LINEAR | · | 5.7 km | MPC · JPL |
| 141249 | 2001 YP_{5} | — | December 17, 2001 | Cima Ekar | ADAS | (8737) | 5.4 km | MPC · JPL |
| 141250 | 2001 YP_{6} | — | December 20, 2001 | Cima Ekar | ADAS | · | 4.5 km | MPC · JPL |
| 141251 | 2001 YR_{8} | — | December 17, 2001 | Socorro | LINEAR | · | 8.4 km | MPC · JPL |
| 141252 | 2001 YU_{8} | — | December 17, 2001 | Socorro | LINEAR | LUT | 7.8 km | MPC · JPL |
| 141253 | 2001 YD_{9} | — | December 17, 2001 | Socorro | LINEAR | · | 4.5 km | MPC · JPL |
| 141254 | 2001 YT_{10} | — | December 17, 2001 | Socorro | LINEAR | · | 3.3 km | MPC · JPL |
| 141255 | 2001 YD_{12} | — | December 17, 2001 | Socorro | LINEAR | KOR | 2.4 km | MPC · JPL |
| 141256 | 2001 YO_{14} | — | December 17, 2001 | Socorro | LINEAR | TEL | 3.4 km | MPC · JPL |
| 141257 | 2001 YK_{20} | — | December 18, 2001 | Socorro | LINEAR | KOR | 2.3 km | MPC · JPL |
| 141258 | 2001 YL_{20} | — | December 18, 2001 | Socorro | LINEAR | · | 4.6 km | MPC · JPL |
| 141259 | 2001 YV_{20} | — | December 18, 2001 | Socorro | LINEAR | · | 7.3 km | MPC · JPL |
| 141260 | 2001 YL_{21} | — | December 18, 2001 | Socorro | LINEAR | · | 5.1 km | MPC · JPL |
| 141261 | 2001 YN_{21} | — | December 18, 2001 | Socorro | LINEAR | VER | 4.2 km | MPC · JPL |
| 141262 | 2001 YT_{25} | — | December 18, 2001 | Socorro | LINEAR | · | 4.1 km | MPC · JPL |
| 141263 | 2001 YW_{25} | — | December 18, 2001 | Socorro | LINEAR | EOS | 3.3 km | MPC · JPL |
| 141264 | 2001 YJ_{27} | — | December 18, 2001 | Socorro | LINEAR | · | 3.3 km | MPC · JPL |
| 141265 | 2001 YE_{28} | — | December 18, 2001 | Socorro | LINEAR | · | 5.9 km | MPC · JPL |
| 141266 | 2001 YZ_{31} | — | December 18, 2001 | Socorro | LINEAR | EOS | 3.2 km | MPC · JPL |
| 141267 | 2001 YB_{32} | — | December 18, 2001 | Socorro | LINEAR | HYG | 4.8 km | MPC · JPL |
| 141268 | 2001 YG_{32} | — | December 18, 2001 | Socorro | LINEAR | EOS | 3.7 km | MPC · JPL |
| 141269 | 2001 YK_{32} | — | December 18, 2001 | Socorro | LINEAR | EOS | 2.9 km | MPC · JPL |
| 141270 | 2001 YA_{38} | — | December 18, 2001 | Socorro | LINEAR | EOS | 2.9 km | MPC · JPL |
| 141271 | 2001 YA_{39} | — | December 18, 2001 | Socorro | LINEAR | · | 2.4 km | MPC · JPL |
| 141272 | 2001 YJ_{42} | — | December 18, 2001 | Socorro | LINEAR | · | 4.3 km | MPC · JPL |
| 141273 | 2001 YM_{42} | — | December 18, 2001 | Socorro | LINEAR | · | 3.3 km | MPC · JPL |
| 141274 | 2001 YY_{42} | — | December 18, 2001 | Socorro | LINEAR | THM | 5.0 km | MPC · JPL |
| 141275 | 2001 YH_{43} | — | December 18, 2001 | Socorro | LINEAR | · | 3.0 km | MPC · JPL |
| 141276 | 2001 YR_{46} | — | December 18, 2001 | Socorro | LINEAR | · | 3.2 km | MPC · JPL |
| 141277 | 2001 YT_{47} | — | December 18, 2001 | Socorro | LINEAR | · | 5.1 km | MPC · JPL |
| 141278 | 2001 YW_{52} | — | December 18, 2001 | Socorro | LINEAR | · | 4.2 km | MPC · JPL |
| 141279 | 2001 YQ_{53} | — | December 18, 2001 | Socorro | LINEAR | THM | 7.8 km | MPC · JPL |
| 141280 | 2001 YS_{53} | — | December 18, 2001 | Socorro | LINEAR | · | 8.7 km | MPC · JPL |
| 141281 | 2001 YD_{56} | — | December 18, 2001 | Socorro | LINEAR | · | 5.4 km | MPC · JPL |
| 141282 | 2001 YU_{58} | — | December 18, 2001 | Socorro | LINEAR | · | 4.8 km | MPC · JPL |
| 141283 | 2001 YV_{58} | — | December 18, 2001 | Socorro | LINEAR | · | 4.9 km | MPC · JPL |
| 141284 | 2001 YX_{59} | — | December 18, 2001 | Socorro | LINEAR | (21885) | 5.0 km | MPC · JPL |
| 141285 | 2001 YC_{65} | — | December 18, 2001 | Socorro | LINEAR | THM | 3.5 km | MPC · JPL |
| 141286 | 2001 YF_{67} | — | December 18, 2001 | Socorro | LINEAR | · | 6.4 km | MPC · JPL |
| 141287 | 2001 YL_{69} | — | December 18, 2001 | Socorro | LINEAR | THM | 6.9 km | MPC · JPL |
| 141288 | 2001 YK_{71} | — | December 18, 2001 | Socorro | LINEAR | EOS | 3.8 km | MPC · JPL |
| 141289 | 2001 YX_{72} | — | December 18, 2001 | Socorro | LINEAR | EUN | 2.6 km | MPC · JPL |
| 141290 | 2001 YT_{74} | — | December 18, 2001 | Socorro | LINEAR | · | 4.5 km | MPC · JPL |
| 141291 | 2001 YO_{81} | — | December 18, 2001 | Socorro | LINEAR | · | 3.6 km | MPC · JPL |
| 141292 | 2001 YR_{81} | — | December 18, 2001 | Socorro | LINEAR | · | 4.6 km | MPC · JPL |
| 141293 | 2001 YD_{86} | — | December 18, 2001 | Socorro | LINEAR | HYG | 4.2 km | MPC · JPL |
| 141294 | 2001 YK_{90} | — | December 18, 2001 | Socorro | LINEAR | · | 6.2 km | MPC · JPL |
| 141295 | 2001 YD_{91} | — | December 17, 2001 | Palomar | NEAT | · | 4.6 km | MPC · JPL |
| 141296 | 2001 YV_{91} | — | December 17, 2001 | Palomar | NEAT | · | 5.4 km | MPC · JPL |
| 141297 | 2001 YZ_{93} | — | December 17, 2001 | Anderson Mesa | LONEOS | H | 980 m | MPC · JPL |
| 141298 | 2001 YH_{99} | — | December 17, 2001 | Socorro | LINEAR | · | 2.9 km | MPC · JPL |
| 141299 | 2001 YO_{99} | — | December 17, 2001 | Socorro | LINEAR | · | 6.6 km | MPC · JPL |
| 141300 | 2001 YK_{104} | — | December 17, 2001 | Socorro | LINEAR | · | 5.4 km | MPC · JPL |

== 141301–141400 ==
back to top

| Designation | | | Discovery | | | Properties | | Ref |
| Permanent | Provisional | Named after | Date | Site | Discoverer(s) | Category | Diam. | Ref |
|---|---|---|---|---|---|---|---|---|
| 141301 | 2001 YL_{104} | — | December 17, 2001 | Socorro | LINEAR | · | 5.1 km | MPC · JPL |
| 141302 | 2001 YU_{106} | — | December 17, 2001 | Socorro | LINEAR | HYG | 8.6 km | MPC · JPL |
| 141303 | 2001 YD_{108} | — | December 17, 2001 | Socorro | LINEAR | · | 4.6 km | MPC · JPL |
| 141304 | 2001 YS_{108} | — | December 18, 2001 | Socorro | LINEAR | EOS | 3.9 km | MPC · JPL |
| 141305 | 2001 YB_{111} | — | December 18, 2001 | Anderson Mesa | LONEOS | DOR | 5.2 km | MPC · JPL |
| 141306 | 2001 YJ_{111} | — | December 18, 2001 | Anderson Mesa | LONEOS | · | 6.1 km | MPC · JPL |
| 141307 | 2001 YK_{112} | — | December 18, 2001 | Anderson Mesa | LONEOS | SYL · CYB | 8.1 km | MPC · JPL |
| 141308 | 2001 YT_{119} | — | December 19, 2001 | Socorro | LINEAR | HYG | 5.2 km | MPC · JPL |
| 141309 | 2001 YP_{120} | — | December 20, 2001 | Socorro | LINEAR | · | 6.4 km | MPC · JPL |
| 141310 | 2001 YC_{121} | — | December 17, 2001 | Socorro | LINEAR | · | 2.4 km | MPC · JPL |
| 141311 | 2001 YD_{121} | — | December 17, 2001 | Socorro | LINEAR | · | 8.9 km | MPC · JPL |
| 141312 | 2001 YU_{121} | — | December 17, 2001 | Socorro | LINEAR | fast | 4.2 km | MPC · JPL |
| 141313 | 2001 YK_{122} | — | December 17, 2001 | Socorro | LINEAR | · | 5.9 km | MPC · JPL |
| 141314 | 2001 YR_{122} | — | December 17, 2001 | Socorro | LINEAR | · | 3.7 km | MPC · JPL |
| 141315 | 2001 YZ_{124} | — | December 17, 2001 | Socorro | LINEAR | · | 2.5 km | MPC · JPL |
| 141316 | 2001 YX_{125} | — | December 17, 2001 | Socorro | LINEAR | · | 5.9 km | MPC · JPL |
| 141317 | 2001 YB_{127} | — | December 17, 2001 | Socorro | LINEAR | HYG | 5.5 km | MPC · JPL |
| 141318 | 2001 YU_{127} | — | December 17, 2001 | Socorro | LINEAR | EUP | 8.5 km | MPC · JPL |
| 141319 | 2001 YC_{128} | — | December 17, 2001 | Socorro | LINEAR | · | 7.1 km | MPC · JPL |
| 141320 | 2001 YA_{129} | — | December 17, 2001 | Socorro | LINEAR | EOS | 3.3 km | MPC · JPL |
| 141321 | 2001 YL_{130} | — | December 17, 2001 | Socorro | LINEAR | HYG | 3.7 km | MPC · JPL |
| 141322 | 2001 YN_{130} | — | December 17, 2001 | Socorro | LINEAR | EOS | 3.3 km | MPC · JPL |
| 141323 | 2001 YZ_{131} | — | December 19, 2001 | Socorro | LINEAR | · | 5.7 km | MPC · JPL |
| 141324 | 2001 YV_{133} | — | December 20, 2001 | Kitt Peak | Spacewatch | CYB | 5.4 km | MPC · JPL |
| 141325 | 2001 YK_{134} | — | December 17, 2001 | Socorro | LINEAR | · | 6.4 km | MPC · JPL |
| 141326 | 2001 YM_{136} | — | December 22, 2001 | Socorro | LINEAR | · | 7.9 km | MPC · JPL |
| 141327 | 2001 YB_{137} | — | December 22, 2001 | Socorro | LINEAR | · | 4.6 km | MPC · JPL |
| 141328 | 2001 YB_{138} | — | December 20, 2001 | Palomar | NEAT | · | 4.3 km | MPC · JPL |
| 141329 | 2001 YR_{144} | — | December 17, 2001 | Socorro | LINEAR | HYG | 4.6 km | MPC · JPL |
| 141330 | 2001 YX_{145} | — | December 18, 2001 | Anderson Mesa | LONEOS | · | 3.8 km | MPC · JPL |
| 141331 | 2001 YF_{146} | — | December 18, 2001 | Socorro | LINEAR | · | 3.7 km | MPC · JPL |
| 141332 | 2001 YB_{153} | — | December 19, 2001 | Anderson Mesa | LONEOS | URS | 6.6 km | MPC · JPL |
| 141333 | 2001 YD_{153} | — | December 19, 2001 | Anderson Mesa | LONEOS | · | 6.1 km | MPC · JPL |
| 141334 | 2001 YP_{154} | — | December 19, 2001 | Socorro | LINEAR | · | 4.3 km | MPC · JPL |
| 141335 | 2001 YP_{156} | — | December 20, 2001 | Palomar | NEAT | · | 6.3 km | MPC · JPL |
| 141336 | 2002 AH_{2} | — | January 3, 2002 | Socorro | LINEAR | EUP | 8.5 km | MPC · JPL |
| 141337 | 2002 AO_{2} | — | January 5, 2002 | Socorro | LINEAR | H | 890 m | MPC · JPL |
| 141338 | 2002 AD_{4} | — | January 6, 2002 | Socorro | LINEAR | H | 1.1 km | MPC · JPL |
| 141339 | 2002 AZ_{4} | — | January 5, 2002 | Cima Ekar | ADAS | H | 1.0 km | MPC · JPL |
| 141340 | 2002 AE_{5} | — | January 8, 2002 | Oaxaca | Roe, J. M. | · | 3.1 km | MPC · JPL |
| 141341 | 2002 AZ_{6} | — | January 9, 2002 | Cima Ekar | ADAS | · | 5.8 km | MPC · JPL |
| 141342 | 2002 AN_{9} | — | January 11, 2002 | Desert Eagle | W. K. Y. Yeung | HYG | 5.3 km | MPC · JPL |
| 141343 | 2002 AK_{13} | — | January 9, 2002 | Haleakala | NEAT | slow | 6.1 km | MPC · JPL |
| 141344 | 2002 AD_{15} | — | January 6, 2002 | Socorro | LINEAR | TIR | 5.7 km | MPC · JPL |
| 141345 | 2002 AQ_{15} | — | January 7, 2002 | Socorro | LINEAR | · | 8.5 km | MPC · JPL |
| 141346 | 2002 AF_{16} | — | January 4, 2002 | Haleakala | NEAT | · | 4.6 km | MPC · JPL |
| 141347 | 2002 AR_{18} | — | January 8, 2002 | Needville | Needville | EUP | 6.3 km | MPC · JPL |
| 141348 | 2002 AJ_{19} | — | January 8, 2002 | Socorro | LINEAR | GEF | 2.2 km | MPC · JPL |
| 141349 | 2002 AO_{22} | — | January 7, 2002 | Haleakala | NEAT | · | 3.5 km | MPC · JPL |
| 141350 | 2002 AR_{22} | — | January 8, 2002 | Haleakala | NEAT | · | 4.1 km | MPC · JPL |
| 141351 | 2002 AE_{25} | — | January 8, 2002 | Palomar | NEAT | HYG | 4.9 km | MPC · JPL |
| 141352 | 2002 AD_{27} | — | January 14, 2002 | Desert Eagle | W. K. Y. Yeung | · | 6.4 km | MPC · JPL |
| 141353 | 2002 AD_{28} | — | January 7, 2002 | Anderson Mesa | LONEOS | · | 5.3 km | MPC · JPL |
| 141354 | 2002 AJ_{29} | — | January 14, 2002 | Anderson Mesa | LONEOS | AMO +1km | 1.2 km | MPC · JPL |
| 141355 | 2002 AK_{29} | — | January 8, 2002 | Socorro | LINEAR | EUN | 3.5 km | MPC · JPL |
| 141356 | 2002 AN_{29} | — | January 8, 2002 | Socorro | LINEAR | GEF | 2.1 km | MPC · JPL |
| 141357 | 2002 AU_{29} | — | January 8, 2002 | Socorro | LINEAR | · | 4.8 km | MPC · JPL |
| 141358 | 2002 AZ_{32} | — | January 12, 2002 | Oaxaca | Roe, J. M. | · | 6.2 km | MPC · JPL |
| 141359 | 2002 AN_{36} | — | January 9, 2002 | Socorro | LINEAR | H | 980 m | MPC · JPL |
| 141360 | 2002 AV_{36} | — | January 9, 2002 | Socorro | LINEAR | PAD | 3.1 km | MPC · JPL |
| 141361 | 2002 AK_{37} | — | January 9, 2002 | Socorro | LINEAR | · | 4.6 km | MPC · JPL |
| 141362 | 2002 AP_{37} | — | January 9, 2002 | Socorro | LINEAR | · | 4.2 km | MPC · JPL |
| 141363 | 2002 AJ_{38} | — | January 9, 2002 | Socorro | LINEAR | · | 1.3 km | MPC · JPL |
| 141364 | 2002 AM_{38} | — | January 9, 2002 | Socorro | LINEAR | AGN | 2.6 km | MPC · JPL |
| 141365 | 2002 AE_{39} | — | January 9, 2002 | Socorro | LINEAR | HYG | 5.3 km | MPC · JPL |
| 141366 | 2002 AJ_{44} | — | January 9, 2002 | Socorro | LINEAR | KOR | 1.8 km | MPC · JPL |
| 141367 | 2002 AL_{44} | — | January 9, 2002 | Socorro | LINEAR | · | 930 m | MPC · JPL |
| 141368 | 2002 AB_{45} | — | January 9, 2002 | Socorro | LINEAR | HYG | 6.0 km | MPC · JPL |
| 141369 | 2002 AX_{45} | — | January 9, 2002 | Socorro | LINEAR | THM | 3.5 km | MPC · JPL |
| 141370 | 2002 AG_{48} | — | January 9, 2002 | Socorro | LINEAR | · | 4.9 km | MPC · JPL |
| 141371 | 2002 AJ_{49} | — | January 9, 2002 | Socorro | LINEAR | · | 3.9 km | MPC · JPL |
| 141372 | 2002 AA_{52} | — | January 9, 2002 | Socorro | LINEAR | · | 3.9 km | MPC · JPL |
| 141373 | 2002 AS_{52} | — | January 9, 2002 | Socorro | LINEAR | · | 7.1 km | MPC · JPL |
| 141374 | 2002 AW_{52} | — | January 9, 2002 | Socorro | LINEAR | HYG | 4.6 km | MPC · JPL |
| 141375 | 2002 AL_{57} | — | January 9, 2002 | Socorro | LINEAR | · | 2.4 km | MPC · JPL |
| 141376 | 2002 AZ_{60} | — | January 11, 2002 | Socorro | LINEAR | H | 920 m | MPC · JPL |
| 141377 | 2002 AJ_{64} | — | January 11, 2002 | Socorro | LINEAR | (45637) · CYB | 8.3 km | MPC · JPL |
| 141378 | 2002 AW_{65} | — | January 12, 2002 | Socorro | LINEAR | · | 4.8 km | MPC · JPL |
| 141379 | 2002 AP_{66} | — | January 12, 2002 | Socorro | LINEAR | · | 5.5 km | MPC · JPL |
| 141380 | 2002 AF_{68} | — | January 11, 2002 | Kitt Peak | Spacewatch | · | 6.4 km | MPC · JPL |
| 141381 | 2002 AP_{69} | — | January 8, 2002 | Socorro | LINEAR | EOS | 3.9 km | MPC · JPL |
| 141382 | 2002 AW_{71} | — | January 8, 2002 | Socorro | LINEAR | · | 4.8 km | MPC · JPL |
| 141383 | 2002 AY_{71} | — | January 8, 2002 | Socorro | LINEAR | KOR | 2.6 km | MPC · JPL |
| 141384 | 2002 AV_{74} | — | January 8, 2002 | Socorro | LINEAR | · | 3.3 km | MPC · JPL |
| 141385 | 2002 AK_{75} | — | January 8, 2002 | Socorro | LINEAR | · | 3.1 km | MPC · JPL |
| 141386 | 2002 AV_{79} | — | January 8, 2002 | Socorro | LINEAR | · | 4.1 km | MPC · JPL |
| 141387 | 2002 AV_{80} | — | January 9, 2002 | Socorro | LINEAR | EOS | 3.3 km | MPC · JPL |
| 141388 | 2002 AQ_{85} | — | January 9, 2002 | Socorro | LINEAR | · | 6.8 km | MPC · JPL |
| 141389 | 2002 AU_{85} | — | January 9, 2002 | Socorro | LINEAR | · | 3.0 km | MPC · JPL |
| 141390 | 2002 AH_{87} | — | January 9, 2002 | Socorro | LINEAR | · | 6.4 km | MPC · JPL |
| 141391 | 2002 AA_{106} | — | January 9, 2002 | Socorro | LINEAR | · | 2.8 km | MPC · JPL |
| 141392 | 2002 AO_{108} | — | January 9, 2002 | Socorro | LINEAR | · | 4.5 km | MPC · JPL |
| 141393 | 2002 AU_{108} | — | January 9, 2002 | Socorro | LINEAR | KOR | 2.3 km | MPC · JPL |
| 141394 | 2002 AS_{109} | — | January 9, 2002 | Socorro | LINEAR | CYB | 4.2 km | MPC · JPL |
| 141395 | 2002 AX_{128} | — | January 14, 2002 | Desert Eagle | W. K. Y. Yeung | · | 4.9 km | MPC · JPL |
| 141396 | 2002 AC_{129} | — | January 13, 2002 | Socorro | LINEAR | PHO | 2.7 km | MPC · JPL |
| 141397 | 2002 AS_{129} | — | January 15, 2002 | Kingsnake | J. V. McClusky | · | 5.9 km | MPC · JPL |
| 141398 | 2002 AV_{129} | — | January 15, 2002 | Kingsnake | J. V. McClusky | H | 830 m | MPC · JPL |
| 141399 | 2002 AN_{131} | — | January 8, 2002 | Socorro | LINEAR | H | 1.0 km | MPC · JPL |
| 141400 | 2002 AD_{132} | — | January 8, 2002 | Socorro | LINEAR | · | 6.0 km | MPC · JPL |

== 141401–141500 ==
back to top

| Designation | | | Discovery | | | Properties | | Ref |
| Permanent | Provisional | Named after | Date | Site | Discoverer(s) | Category | Diam. | Ref |
|---|---|---|---|---|---|---|---|---|
| 141401 | 2002 AD_{134} | — | January 9, 2002 | Socorro | LINEAR | · | 3.6 km | MPC · JPL |
| 141402 | 2002 AE_{145} | — | January 13, 2002 | Socorro | LINEAR | THM | 3.0 km | MPC · JPL |
| 141403 | 2002 AH_{149} | — | January 14, 2002 | Socorro | LINEAR | THM | 2.9 km | MPC · JPL |
| 141404 | 2002 AV_{150} | — | January 14, 2002 | Socorro | LINEAR | HYG | 6.8 km | MPC · JPL |
| 141405 | 2002 AP_{152} | — | January 14, 2002 | Socorro | LINEAR | THM | 3.8 km | MPC · JPL |
| 141406 | 2002 AR_{162} | — | January 13, 2002 | Socorro | LINEAR | · | 1.7 km | MPC · JPL |
| 141407 | 2002 AC_{165} | — | January 13, 2002 | Socorro | LINEAR | · | 4.1 km | MPC · JPL |
| 141408 | 2002 AH_{172} | — | January 14, 2002 | Socorro | LINEAR | · | 3.2 km | MPC · JPL |
| 141409 | 2002 AV_{177} | — | January 14, 2002 | Socorro | LINEAR | MAS | 1.1 km | MPC · JPL |
| 141410 | 2002 AZ_{179} | — | January 6, 2002 | Socorro | LINEAR | (7605) | 9.5 km | MPC · JPL |
| 141411 | 2002 AB_{182} | — | January 5, 2002 | Palomar | NEAT | · | 4.6 km | MPC · JPL |
| 141412 | 2002 AW_{184} | — | January 8, 2002 | Palomar | NEAT | · | 5.4 km | MPC · JPL |
| 141413 | 2002 AM_{199} | — | January 8, 2002 | Socorro | LINEAR | · | 3.3 km | MPC · JPL |
| 141414 Bochanski | 2002 AK_{205} | Bochanski | January 8, 2002 | Apache Point | SDSS | EOS | 3.4 km | MPC · JPL |
| 141415 | 2002 BR_{4} | — | January 19, 2002 | Anderson Mesa | LONEOS | T_{j} (2.98) | 6.3 km | MPC · JPL |
| 141416 | 2002 BR_{19} | — | January 21, 2002 | Palomar | NEAT | · | 6.5 km | MPC · JPL |
| 141417 | 2002 BM_{20} | — | January 22, 2002 | Socorro | LINEAR | H | 1.2 km | MPC · JPL |
| 141418 | 2002 BD_{21} | — | January 25, 2002 | Socorro | LINEAR | H | 890 m | MPC · JPL |
| 141419 | 2002 BM_{21} | — | January 25, 2002 | Socorro | LINEAR | (895) | 7.8 km | MPC · JPL |
| 141420 | 2002 BG_{24} | — | January 23, 2002 | Socorro | LINEAR | CYB | 6.8 km | MPC · JPL |
| 141421 | 2002 BB_{29} | — | January 20, 2002 | Anderson Mesa | LONEOS | · | 8.0 km | MPC · JPL |
| 141422 | 2002 BU_{29} | — | January 21, 2002 | Anderson Mesa | LONEOS | · | 7.6 km | MPC · JPL |
| 141423 | 2002 BZ_{29} | — | January 21, 2002 | Anderson Mesa | LONEOS | · | 6.9 km | MPC · JPL |
| 141424 | 2002 CD | — | February 1, 2002 | Socorro | LINEAR | ATE | 260 m | MPC · JPL |
| 141425 | 2002 CV_{1} | — | February 3, 2002 | Palomar | NEAT | · | 1.9 km | MPC · JPL |
| 141426 | 2002 CX_{6} | — | February 1, 2002 | Socorro | LINEAR | H | 980 m | MPC · JPL |
| 141427 | 2002 CB_{7} | — | February 1, 2002 | Socorro | LINEAR | H | 680 m | MPC · JPL |
| 141428 | 2002 CR_{7} | — | February 6, 2002 | Desert Eagle | W. K. Y. Yeung | NYS | 1.9 km | MPC · JPL |
| 141429 | 2002 CL_{9} | — | February 6, 2002 | Kitt Peak | Spacewatch | AGN | 2.1 km | MPC · JPL |
| 141430 | 2002 CO_{10} | — | February 6, 2002 | Socorro | LINEAR | H | 990 m | MPC · JPL |
| 141431 | 2002 CS_{10} | — | February 6, 2002 | Socorro | LINEAR | H | 1.3 km | MPC · JPL |
| 141432 | 2002 CQ_{11} | — | February 6, 2002 | Socorro | LINEAR | ATE · PHA | 240 m | MPC · JPL |
| 141433 | 2002 CX_{12} | — | February 8, 2002 | Fountain Hills | C. W. Juels, P. R. Holvorcem | · | 2.6 km | MPC · JPL |
| 141434 | 2002 CP_{14} | — | February 9, 2002 | Pla D'Arguines | R. Ferrando | · | 4.6 km | MPC · JPL |
| 141435 | 2002 CU_{20} | — | February 4, 2002 | Palomar | NEAT | EOS | 3.1 km | MPC · JPL |
| 141436 | 2002 CZ_{20} | — | February 4, 2002 | Palomar | NEAT | · | 1.7 km | MPC · JPL |
| 141437 | 2002 CQ_{26} | — | February 6, 2002 | Socorro | LINEAR | · | 7.3 km | MPC · JPL |
| 141438 | 2002 CC_{29} | — | February 6, 2002 | Socorro | LINEAR | EOS | 3.8 km | MPC · JPL |
| 141439 | 2002 CQ_{29} | — | February 6, 2002 | Socorro | LINEAR | · | 5.8 km | MPC · JPL |
| 141440 | 2002 CC_{31} | — | February 6, 2002 | Socorro | LINEAR | HYG | 4.3 km | MPC · JPL |
| 141441 | 2002 CB_{33} | — | February 6, 2002 | Socorro | LINEAR | · | 1.5 km | MPC · JPL |
| 141442 | 2002 CJ_{34} | — | February 6, 2002 | Socorro | LINEAR | · | 3.7 km | MPC · JPL |
| 141443 | 2002 CX_{42} | — | February 12, 2002 | Fountain Hills | C. W. Juels, P. R. Holvorcem | · | 5.4 km | MPC · JPL |
| 141444 | 2002 CU_{45} | — | February 8, 2002 | Palomar | NEAT | H | 1.1 km | MPC · JPL |
| 141445 | 2002 CA_{55} | — | February 7, 2002 | Socorro | LINEAR | · | 4.6 km | MPC · JPL |
| 141446 | 2002 CC_{58} | — | February 7, 2002 | Kitt Peak | Spacewatch | · | 4.0 km | MPC · JPL |
| 141447 | 2002 CW_{59} | — | February 13, 2002 | Socorro | LINEAR | AMO +1km | 1.3 km | MPC · JPL |
| 141448 | 2002 CF_{61} | — | February 6, 2002 | Socorro | LINEAR | · | 5.6 km | MPC · JPL |
| 141449 | 2002 CZ_{64} | — | February 6, 2002 | Socorro | LINEAR | EOS | 3.1 km | MPC · JPL |
| 141450 | 2002 CT_{66} | — | February 7, 2002 | Socorro | LINEAR | · | 3.7 km | MPC · JPL |
| 141451 | 2002 CQ_{80} | — | February 7, 2002 | Socorro | LINEAR | · | 4.4 km | MPC · JPL |
| 141452 | 2002 CV_{83} | — | February 7, 2002 | Socorro | LINEAR | · | 3.2 km | MPC · JPL |
| 141453 | 2002 CE_{87} | — | February 7, 2002 | Socorro | LINEAR | · | 1.0 km | MPC · JPL |
| 141454 | 2002 CW_{92} | — | February 7, 2002 | Socorro | LINEAR | · | 3.7 km | MPC · JPL |
| 141455 | 2002 CE_{95} | — | February 7, 2002 | Socorro | LINEAR | · | 1.9 km | MPC · JPL |
| 141456 | 2002 CP_{95} | — | February 7, 2002 | Socorro | LINEAR | · | 1.3 km | MPC · JPL |
| 141457 | 2002 CG_{98} | — | February 7, 2002 | Socorro | LINEAR | · | 970 m | MPC · JPL |
| 141458 | 2002 CB_{100} | — | February 7, 2002 | Socorro | LINEAR | · | 5.4 km | MPC · JPL |
| 141459 | 2002 CQ_{100} | — | February 7, 2002 | Socorro | LINEAR | KOR | 2.9 km | MPC · JPL |
| 141460 | 2002 CM_{111} | — | February 7, 2002 | Socorro | LINEAR | · | 5.0 km | MPC · JPL |
| 141461 | 2002 CU_{119} | — | February 7, 2002 | Socorro | LINEAR | · | 4.6 km | MPC · JPL |
| 141462 | 2002 CB_{121} | — | February 7, 2002 | Socorro | LINEAR | KOR | 2.2 km | MPC · JPL |
| 141463 | 2002 CC_{127} | — | February 7, 2002 | Socorro | LINEAR | THB | 5.3 km | MPC · JPL |
| 141464 | 2002 CS_{140} | — | February 8, 2002 | Socorro | LINEAR | EOS | 3.7 km | MPC · JPL |
| 141465 | 2002 CC_{141} | — | February 8, 2002 | Socorro | LINEAR | HYG | 5.8 km | MPC · JPL |
| 141466 | 2002 CU_{145} | — | February 9, 2002 | Socorro | LINEAR | H | 920 m | MPC · JPL |
| 141467 | 2002 CO_{152} | — | February 7, 2002 | Haleakala | NEAT | · | 8.0 km | MPC · JPL |
| 141468 | 2002 CL_{161} | — | February 8, 2002 | Socorro | LINEAR | · | 1.2 km | MPC · JPL |
| 141469 | 2002 CO_{163} | — | February 8, 2002 | Socorro | LINEAR | NYS | 1.5 km | MPC · JPL |
| 141470 | 2002 CH_{183} | — | February 10, 2002 | Socorro | LINEAR | · | 3.6 km | MPC · JPL |
| 141471 | 2002 CW_{205} | — | February 10, 2002 | Socorro | LINEAR | · | 1.5 km | MPC · JPL |
| 141472 | 2002 CQ_{207} | — | February 10, 2002 | Socorro | LINEAR | · | 2.5 km | MPC · JPL |
| 141473 | 2002 CE_{215} | — | February 10, 2002 | Socorro | LINEAR | · | 3.6 km | MPC · JPL |
| 141474 | 2002 CM_{219} | — | February 10, 2002 | Socorro | LINEAR | · | 3.2 km | MPC · JPL |
| 141475 | 2002 CM_{236} | — | February 13, 2002 | Kitt Peak | Spacewatch | EOS | 3.7 km | MPC · JPL |
| 141476 | 2002 CD_{241} | — | February 11, 2002 | Socorro | LINEAR | · | 3.6 km | MPC · JPL |
| 141477 | 2002 CP_{245} | — | February 13, 2002 | Kitt Peak | Spacewatch | · | 970 m | MPC · JPL |
| 141478 | 2002 CN_{256} | — | February 4, 2002 | Anderson Mesa | LONEOS | · | 6.0 km | MPC · JPL |
| 141479 | 2002 CA_{265} | — | February 8, 2002 | Kitt Peak | Spacewatch | ERI | 3.2 km | MPC · JPL |
| 141480 | 2002 CD_{273} | — | February 8, 2002 | Anderson Mesa | LONEOS | ERI | 2.9 km | MPC · JPL |
| 141481 | 2002 CM_{288} | — | February 10, 2002 | Socorro | LINEAR | CYB | 4.7 km | MPC · JPL |
| 141482 | 2002 DV_{1} | — | February 19, 2002 | Socorro | LINEAR | H | 930 m | MPC · JPL |
| 141483 | 2002 DP_{2} | — | February 19, 2002 | Socorro | LINEAR | H | 1.2 km | MPC · JPL |
| 141484 | 2002 DB_{4} | — | February 26, 2002 | Anderson Mesa | LONEOS | ATE +1km | 1.0 km | MPC · JPL |
| 141485 | 2002 DG_{8} | — | February 19, 2002 | Socorro | LINEAR | · | 6.3 km | MPC · JPL |
| 141486 | 2002 DZ_{10} | — | February 19, 2002 | Socorro | LINEAR | · | 10 km | MPC · JPL |
| 141487 | 2002 DP_{16} | — | February 20, 2002 | Kitt Peak | Spacewatch | · | 1.3 km | MPC · JPL |
| 141488 | 2002 DK_{18} | — | February 21, 2002 | Socorro | LINEAR | H | 1.2 km | MPC · JPL |
| 141489 | 2002 DR_{18} | — | February 22, 2002 | Palomar | NEAT | · | 830 m | MPC · JPL |
| 141490 | 2002 EH | — | March 3, 2002 | Socorro | LINEAR | H | 970 m | MPC · JPL |
| 141491 | 2002 EL | — | March 4, 2002 | Socorro | LINEAR | H | 1.5 km | MPC · JPL |
| 141492 | 2002 EB_{7} | — | March 6, 2002 | Siding Spring | R. H. McNaught | · | 860 m | MPC · JPL |
| 141493 | 2002 ES_{7} | — | March 12, 2002 | Socorro | LINEAR | · | 1.2 km | MPC · JPL |
| 141494 | 2002 EB_{9} | — | March 13, 2002 | Socorro | LINEAR | H | 1.0 km | MPC · JPL |
| 141495 | 2002 EZ_{11} | — | March 15, 2002 | Palomar | NEAT | APO · PHA | 720 m | MPC · JPL |
| 141496 Bartkevičius | 2002 ED_{13} | Bartkevičius | March 15, 2002 | Moletai | K. Černis, Zdanavicius, J. | · | 1.9 km | MPC · JPL |
| 141497 | 2002 EW_{13} | — | March 3, 2002 | Haleakala | NEAT | THM | 5.8 km | MPC · JPL |
| 141498 | 2002 EZ_{16} | — | March 8, 2002 | Mauna Kea | D. J. Tholen | ATE | 730 m | MPC · JPL |
| 141499 | 2002 ES_{20} | — | March 9, 2002 | Socorro | LINEAR | · | 1.2 km | MPC · JPL |
| 141500 | 2002 EO_{37} | — | March 9, 2002 | Kitt Peak | Spacewatch | · | 1.6 km | MPC · JPL |

== 141501–141600 ==
back to top

| Designation | | | Discovery | | | Properties | | Ref |
| Permanent | Provisional | Named after | Date | Site | Discoverer(s) | Category | Diam. | Ref |
|---|---|---|---|---|---|---|---|---|
| 141501 | 2002 ES_{42} | — | March 12, 2002 | Socorro | LINEAR | · | 1.7 km | MPC · JPL |
| 141502 | 2002 ET_{46} | — | March 11, 2002 | Haleakala | NEAT | NYS | 1.7 km | MPC · JPL |
| 141503 | 2002 EW_{58} | — | March 13, 2002 | Socorro | LINEAR | 3:2 | 11 km | MPC · JPL |
| 141504 | 2002 ET_{66} | — | March 13, 2002 | Socorro | LINEAR | HYG | 6.6 km | MPC · JPL |
| 141505 | 2002 ED_{73} | — | March 13, 2002 | Socorro | LINEAR | · | 1.0 km | MPC · JPL |
| 141506 | 2002 EO_{74} | — | March 13, 2002 | Socorro | LINEAR | · | 1.1 km | MPC · JPL |
| 141507 | 2002 ER_{79} | — | March 10, 2002 | Haleakala | NEAT | · | 1.3 km | MPC · JPL |
| 141508 | 2002 EY_{79} | — | March 12, 2002 | Palomar | NEAT | · | 5.0 km | MPC · JPL |
| 141509 | 2002 ET_{84} | — | March 9, 2002 | Socorro | LINEAR | · | 1.2 km | MPC · JPL |
| 141510 | 2002 EU_{88} | — | March 9, 2002 | Socorro | LINEAR | · | 3.5 km | MPC · JPL |
| 141511 | 2002 EK_{90} | — | March 12, 2002 | Socorro | LINEAR | THM | 3.6 km | MPC · JPL |
| 141512 | 2002 EO_{90} | — | March 12, 2002 | Socorro | LINEAR | · | 1.0 km | MPC · JPL |
| 141513 | 2002 EZ_{93} | — | March 14, 2002 | Socorro | LINEAR | SYL · CYB | 7.0 km | MPC · JPL |
| 141514 | 2002 EC_{94} | — | March 14, 2002 | Socorro | LINEAR | THM | 4.7 km | MPC · JPL |
| 141515 | 2002 EU_{97} | — | March 12, 2002 | Socorro | LINEAR | EOS | 3.5 km | MPC · JPL |
| 141516 | 2002 ER_{98} | — | March 13, 2002 | Socorro | LINEAR | · | 1.3 km | MPC · JPL |
| 141517 | 2002 EG_{102} | — | March 6, 2002 | Palomar | NEAT | · | 1.2 km | MPC · JPL |
| 141518 | 2002 EB_{136} | — | March 12, 2002 | Kitt Peak | Spacewatch | HIL · 3:2 | 9.2 km | MPC · JPL |
| 141519 | 2002 ED_{137} | — | March 12, 2002 | Palomar | NEAT | · | 3.9 km | MPC · JPL |
| 141520 | 2002 EL_{144} | — | March 13, 2002 | Kitt Peak | Spacewatch | · | 1.8 km | MPC · JPL |
| 141521 | 2002 ER_{144} | — | March 13, 2002 | Kitt Peak | Spacewatch | NYS | 2.1 km | MPC · JPL |
| 141522 | 2002 EF_{147} | — | March 14, 2002 | Palomar | NEAT | · | 6.7 km | MPC · JPL |
| 141523 | 2002 EQ_{149} | — | March 15, 2002 | Palomar | NEAT | L4 | 10 km | MPC · JPL |
| 141524 | 2002 FE_{5} | — | March 20, 2002 | Socorro | LINEAR | H | 1.2 km | MPC · JPL |
| 141525 | 2002 FV_{5} | — | March 21, 2002 | Socorro | LINEAR | APO +1km · PHA | 860 m | MPC · JPL |
| 141526 | 2002 FA_{6} | — | March 21, 2002 | Anderson Mesa | LONEOS | APO | 320 m | MPC · JPL |
| 141527 | 2002 FG_{7} | — | March 28, 2002 | Haleakala | NEAT | APO · PHA | 580 m | MPC · JPL |
| 141528 | 2002 FN_{21} | — | March 19, 2002 | Socorro | LINEAR | · | 5.0 km | MPC · JPL |
| 141529 | 2002 FG_{24} | — | March 19, 2002 | Palomar | NEAT | TIR | 5.6 km | MPC · JPL |
| 141530 | 2002 FE_{37} | — | March 30, 2002 | Palomar | NEAT | H | 1.1 km | MPC · JPL |
| 141531 | 2002 GB | — | April 1, 2002 | Socorro | LINEAR | ATE | 300 m | MPC · JPL |
| 141532 | 2002 GE_{3} | — | April 6, 2002 | Socorro | LINEAR | · | 1.4 km | MPC · JPL |
| 141533 | 2002 GG_{3} | — | April 6, 2002 | Socorro | LINEAR | H | 1.2 km | MPC · JPL |
| 141534 | 2002 GJ_{3} | — | April 8, 2002 | Socorro | LINEAR | H | 1.3 km | MPC · JPL |
| 141535 | 2002 GG_{5} | — | April 10, 2002 | Socorro | LINEAR | · | 1.4 km | MPC · JPL |
| 141536 | 2002 GM_{7} | — | April 14, 2002 | Desert Eagle | W. K. Y. Yeung | · | 1.2 km | MPC · JPL |
| 141537 | 2002 GY_{10} | — | April 10, 2002 | Socorro | LINEAR | slow | 1.2 km | MPC · JPL |
| 141538 | 2002 GA_{11} | — | April 10, 2002 | Socorro | LINEAR | · | 1.4 km | MPC · JPL |
| 141539 | 2002 GA_{14} | — | April 14, 2002 | Socorro | LINEAR | · | 890 m | MPC · JPL |
| 141540 | 2002 GC_{14} | — | April 14, 2002 | Socorro | LINEAR | · | 1.4 km | MPC · JPL |
| 141541 | 2002 GL_{14} | — | April 14, 2002 | Socorro | LINEAR | · | 1.5 km | MPC · JPL |
| 141542 | 2002 GO_{18} | — | April 12, 2002 | Haleakala | NEAT | · | 1.2 km | MPC · JPL |
| 141543 | 2002 GX_{22} | — | April 14, 2002 | Haleakala | NEAT | · | 1.1 km | MPC · JPL |
| 141544 | 2002 GY_{22} | — | April 15, 2002 | Palomar | NEAT | HYG | 6.1 km | MPC · JPL |
| 141545 | 2002 GH_{26} | — | April 14, 2002 | Socorro | LINEAR | · | 1.5 km | MPC · JPL |
| 141546 | 2002 GD_{45} | — | April 4, 2002 | Palomar | NEAT | · | 4.8 km | MPC · JPL |
| 141547 | 2002 GS_{46} | — | April 5, 2002 | Anderson Mesa | LONEOS | · | 960 m | MPC · JPL |
| 141548 | 2002 GW_{46} | — | April 5, 2002 | Palomar | NEAT | · | 1.8 km | MPC · JPL |
| 141549 | 2002 GT_{50} | — | April 5, 2002 | Anderson Mesa | LONEOS | · | 1.1 km | MPC · JPL |
| 141550 | 2002 GW_{52} | — | April 5, 2002 | Anderson Mesa | LONEOS | · | 970 m | MPC · JPL |
| 141551 | 2002 GO_{55} | — | April 5, 2002 | Anderson Mesa | LONEOS | · | 950 m | MPC · JPL |
| 141552 | 2002 GC_{56} | — | April 5, 2002 | Anderson Mesa | LONEOS | · | 980 m | MPC · JPL |
| 141553 | 2002 GL_{58} | — | April 8, 2002 | Palomar | NEAT | · | 1.3 km | MPC · JPL |
| 141554 | 2002 GV_{58} | — | April 8, 2002 | Palomar | NEAT | · | 1.2 km | MPC · JPL |
| 141555 | 2002 GW_{67} | — | April 8, 2002 | Palomar | NEAT | · | 960 m | MPC · JPL |
| 141556 | 2002 GT_{69} | — | April 8, 2002 | Palomar | NEAT | · | 1.5 km | MPC · JPL |
| 141557 | 2002 GY_{69} | — | April 8, 2002 | Palomar | NEAT | 3:2 · SHU | 11 km | MPC · JPL |
| 141558 | 2002 GZ_{73} | — | April 9, 2002 | Anderson Mesa | LONEOS | · | 1.3 km | MPC · JPL |
| 141559 | 2002 GQ_{76} | — | April 7, 2002 | Bergisch Gladbach | W. Bickel | · | 1.9 km | MPC · JPL |
| 141560 | 2002 GE_{78} | — | April 9, 2002 | Socorro | LINEAR | NYS | 1.4 km | MPC · JPL |
| 141561 | 2002 GL_{79} | — | April 10, 2002 | Socorro | LINEAR | · | 1.5 km | MPC · JPL |
| 141562 | 2002 GY_{86} | — | April 10, 2002 | Palomar | NEAT | · | 4.8 km | MPC · JPL |
| 141563 | 2002 GQ_{94} | — | April 9, 2002 | Socorro | LINEAR | · | 2.2 km | MPC · JPL |
| 141564 | 2002 GE_{101} | — | April 10, 2002 | Socorro | LINEAR | · | 2.6 km | MPC · JPL |
| 141565 | 2002 GS_{103} | — | April 10, 2002 | Socorro | LINEAR | · | 1.1 km | MPC · JPL |
| 141566 | 2002 GB_{107} | — | April 11, 2002 | Socorro | LINEAR | · | 1.2 km | MPC · JPL |
| 141567 | 2002 GC_{108} | — | April 11, 2002 | Socorro | LINEAR | · | 1.3 km | MPC · JPL |
| 141568 | 2002 GG_{111} | — | April 10, 2002 | Socorro | LINEAR | · | 1.3 km | MPC · JPL |
| 141569 | 2002 GT_{111} | — | April 10, 2002 | Socorro | LINEAR | · | 1.0 km | MPC · JPL |
| 141570 | 2002 GT_{125} | — | April 12, 2002 | Socorro | LINEAR | · | 980 m | MPC · JPL |
| 141571 | 2002 GA_{127} | — | April 12, 2002 | Palomar | NEAT | · | 2.1 km | MPC · JPL |
| 141572 | 2002 GB_{128} | — | April 12, 2002 | Socorro | LINEAR | · | 5.0 km | MPC · JPL |
| 141573 | 2002 GC_{132} | — | April 12, 2002 | Socorro | LINEAR | NEM · slow | 3.2 km | MPC · JPL |
| 141574 | 2002 GZ_{137} | — | April 12, 2002 | Palomar | NEAT | · | 5.3 km | MPC · JPL |
| 141575 | 2002 GD_{142} | — | April 13, 2002 | Palomar | NEAT | · | 2.2 km | MPC · JPL |
| 141576 | 2002 GH_{142} | — | April 13, 2002 | Palomar | NEAT | · | 2.3 km | MPC · JPL |
| 141577 | 2002 GS_{149} | — | April 14, 2002 | Socorro | LINEAR | L4 | 15 km | MPC · JPL |
| 141578 | 2002 GT_{159} | — | April 14, 2002 | Socorro | LINEAR | · | 950 m | MPC · JPL |
| 141579 | 2002 GJ_{161} | — | April 15, 2002 | Anderson Mesa | LONEOS | · | 1.4 km | MPC · JPL |
| 141580 | 2002 GU_{164} | — | April 14, 2002 | Palomar | NEAT | · | 2.2 km | MPC · JPL |
| 141581 | 2002 GQ_{167} | — | April 9, 2002 | Socorro | LINEAR | · | 1.3 km | MPC · JPL |
| 141582 | 2002 GC_{169} | — | April 9, 2002 | Socorro | LINEAR | · | 1.3 km | MPC · JPL |
| 141583 | 2002 GB_{171} | — | April 10, 2002 | Socorro | LINEAR | · | 3.6 km | MPC · JPL |
| 141584 | 2002 GU_{178} | — | April 15, 2002 | Palomar | NEAT | L4 | 20 km | MPC · JPL |
| 141585 | 2002 HE | — | April 16, 2002 | Socorro | LINEAR | H | 1.4 km | MPC · JPL |
| 141586 | 2002 HQ | — | April 16, 2002 | Desert Eagle | W. K. Y. Yeung | (2076) | 1.7 km | MPC · JPL |
| 141587 | 2002 HW_{2} | — | April 16, 2002 | Socorro | LINEAR | · | 1.2 km | MPC · JPL |
| 141588 | 2002 HY_{2} | — | April 16, 2002 | Socorro | LINEAR | · | 1.1 km | MPC · JPL |
| 141589 | 2002 HA_{3} | — | April 16, 2002 | Socorro | LINEAR | · | 1.1 km | MPC · JPL |
| 141590 | 2002 HS_{6} | — | April 18, 2002 | Palomar | NEAT | · | 1.2 km | MPC · JPL |
| 141591 | 2002 HC_{9} | — | April 16, 2002 | Socorro | LINEAR | · | 1.0 km | MPC · JPL |
| 141592 | 2002 HN_{10} | — | April 18, 2002 | Socorro | LINEAR | · | 2.1 km | MPC · JPL |
| 141593 | 2002 HK_{12} | — | April 30, 2002 | Palomar | NEAT | APO · PHA | 770 m | MPC · JPL |
| 141594 | 2002 HN_{12} | — | April 30, 2002 | Needville | J. Dellinger | · | 780 m | MPC · JPL |
| 141595 | 2002 HY_{12} | — | April 21, 2002 | Socorro | LINEAR | H | 1.4 km | MPC · JPL |
| 141596 | 2002 HA_{14} | — | April 21, 2002 | Socorro | LINEAR | PHO | 2.2 km | MPC · JPL |
| 141597 | 2002 HG_{17} | — | April 19, 2002 | Kitt Peak | Spacewatch | · | 2.8 km | MPC · JPL |
| 141598 | 2002 JJ | — | May 3, 2002 | Desert Eagle | W. K. Y. Yeung | · | 1.9 km | MPC · JPL |
| 141599 | 2002 JL | — | May 3, 2002 | Desert Eagle | W. K. Y. Yeung | · | 1.3 km | MPC · JPL |
| 141600 | 2002 JA_{2} | — | May 4, 2002 | Desert Eagle | W. K. Y. Yeung | · | 1.7 km | MPC · JPL |

== 141601–141700 ==
back to top

| Designation | | | Discovery | | | Properties | | Ref |
| Permanent | Provisional | Named after | Date | Site | Discoverer(s) | Category | Diam. | Ref |
|---|---|---|---|---|---|---|---|---|
| 141601 | 2002 JS_{4} | — | May 5, 2002 | Socorro | LINEAR | PHO | 2.0 km | MPC · JPL |
| 141602 | 2002 JT_{4} | — | May 5, 2002 | Socorro | LINEAR | H | 1.1 km | MPC · JPL |
| 141603 | 2002 JX_{4} | — | May 5, 2002 | Desert Eagle | W. K. Y. Yeung | · | 1.1 km | MPC · JPL |
| 141604 | 2002 JB_{5} | — | May 5, 2002 | Desert Eagle | W. K. Y. Yeung | · | 1.6 km | MPC · JPL |
| 141605 | 2002 JC_{10} | — | May 6, 2002 | Socorro | LINEAR | H | 1.3 km | MPC · JPL |
| 141606 | 2002 JD_{10} | — | May 6, 2002 | Socorro | LINEAR | PHO | 1.6 km | MPC · JPL |
| 141607 | 2002 JG_{11} | — | May 2, 2002 | Anderson Mesa | LONEOS | · | 6.4 km | MPC · JPL |
| 141608 | 2002 JY_{11} | — | May 6, 2002 | Anderson Mesa | LONEOS | · | 1.4 km | MPC · JPL |
| 141609 | 2002 JB_{12} | — | May 6, 2002 | Anderson Mesa | LONEOS | · | 1.5 km | MPC · JPL |
| 141610 | 2002 JK_{12} | — | May 4, 2002 | Desert Eagle | W. K. Y. Yeung | · | 1.2 km | MPC · JPL |
| 141611 | 2002 JP_{12} | — | May 6, 2002 | Desert Eagle | W. K. Y. Yeung | · | 2.0 km | MPC · JPL |
| 141612 | 2002 JA_{13} | — | May 8, 2002 | Desert Eagle | W. K. Y. Yeung | · | 1.2 km | MPC · JPL |
| 141613 | 2002 JZ_{14} | — | May 8, 2002 | Socorro | LINEAR | · | 1.2 km | MPC · JPL |
| 141614 | 2002 JV_{15} | — | May 8, 2002 | Socorro | LINEAR | APO · PHA | 440 m | MPC · JPL |
| 141615 | 2002 JQ_{17} | — | May 7, 2002 | Palomar | NEAT | · | 2.1 km | MPC · JPL |
| 141616 | 2002 JU_{20} | — | May 7, 2002 | Palomar | NEAT | · | 1.3 km | MPC · JPL |
| 141617 | 2002 JQ_{24} | — | May 8, 2002 | Socorro | LINEAR | · | 1.3 km | MPC · JPL |
| 141618 | 2002 JH_{25} | — | May 8, 2002 | Socorro | LINEAR | · | 1.7 km | MPC · JPL |
| 141619 | 2002 JH_{26} | — | May 8, 2002 | Socorro | LINEAR | · | 1.4 km | MPC · JPL |
| 141620 | 2002 JR_{30} | — | May 9, 2002 | Socorro | LINEAR | · | 1.4 km | MPC · JPL |
| 141621 | 2002 JY_{32} | — | May 9, 2002 | Socorro | LINEAR | · | 1.1 km | MPC · JPL |
| 141622 | 2002 JH_{33} | — | May 9, 2002 | Socorro | LINEAR | · | 1.2 km | MPC · JPL |
| 141623 | 2002 JJ_{34} | — | May 9, 2002 | Socorro | LINEAR | · | 3.6 km | MPC · JPL |
| 141624 | 2002 JP_{34} | — | May 9, 2002 | Socorro | LINEAR | · | 1.3 km | MPC · JPL |
| 141625 | 2002 JY_{34} | — | May 9, 2002 | Socorro | LINEAR | · | 1.2 km | MPC · JPL |
| 141626 | 2002 JA_{37} | — | May 9, 2002 | Anderson Mesa | LONEOS | PHO | 1.2 km | MPC · JPL |
| 141627 | 2002 JM_{37} | — | May 8, 2002 | Haleakala | NEAT | · | 1.3 km | MPC · JPL |
| 141628 | 2002 JR_{38} | — | May 9, 2002 | Palomar | NEAT | · | 1.2 km | MPC · JPL |
| 141629 | 2002 JM_{43} | — | May 9, 2002 | Socorro | LINEAR | (2076) | 1.3 km | MPC · JPL |
| 141630 | 2002 JY_{48} | — | May 9, 2002 | Socorro | LINEAR | · | 1.5 km | MPC · JPL |
| 141631 | 2002 JL_{49} | — | May 9, 2002 | Socorro | LINEAR | · | 1.5 km | MPC · JPL |
| 141632 | 2002 JT_{49} | — | May 9, 2002 | Socorro | LINEAR | · | 1.3 km | MPC · JPL |
| 141633 | 2002 JQ_{50} | — | May 9, 2002 | Socorro | LINEAR | · | 1.3 km | MPC · JPL |
| 141634 | 2002 JC_{51} | — | May 9, 2002 | Socorro | LINEAR | · | 1.7 km | MPC · JPL |
| 141635 | 2002 JV_{51} | — | May 9, 2002 | Socorro | LINEAR | · | 1.4 km | MPC · JPL |
| 141636 | 2002 JF_{52} | — | May 9, 2002 | Socorro | LINEAR | · | 1.4 km | MPC · JPL |
| 141637 | 2002 JJ_{53} | — | May 9, 2002 | Socorro | LINEAR | · | 1.0 km | MPC · JPL |
| 141638 | 2002 JA_{55} | — | May 9, 2002 | Socorro | LINEAR | V | 1.2 km | MPC · JPL |
| 141639 | 2002 JB_{55} | — | May 9, 2002 | Socorro | LINEAR | · | 1.1 km | MPC · JPL |
| 141640 | 2002 JL_{55} | — | May 9, 2002 | Socorro | LINEAR | · | 1.4 km | MPC · JPL |
| 141641 | 2002 JZ_{55} | — | May 9, 2002 | Socorro | LINEAR | · | 980 m | MPC · JPL |
| 141642 | 2002 JK_{56} | — | May 9, 2002 | Socorro | LINEAR | · | 1.2 km | MPC · JPL |
| 141643 | 2002 JU_{56} | — | May 9, 2002 | Socorro | LINEAR | · | 780 m | MPC · JPL |
| 141644 | 2002 JV_{59} | — | May 9, 2002 | Socorro | LINEAR | · | 1.1 km | MPC · JPL |
| 141645 | 2002 JW_{59} | — | May 9, 2002 | Socorro | LINEAR | · | 1.5 km | MPC · JPL |
| 141646 | 2002 JS_{62} | — | May 8, 2002 | Socorro | LINEAR | · | 1.8 km | MPC · JPL |
| 141647 | 2002 JT_{62} | — | May 8, 2002 | Socorro | LINEAR | · | 1.3 km | MPC · JPL |
| 141648 | 2002 JJ_{64} | — | May 9, 2002 | Socorro | LINEAR | NYS | 1.6 km | MPC · JPL |
| 141649 | 2002 JW_{65} | — | May 9, 2002 | Socorro | LINEAR | PHO | 2.0 km | MPC · JPL |
| 141650 | 2002 JD_{66} | — | May 9, 2002 | Socorro | LINEAR | · | 1.1 km | MPC · JPL |
| 141651 | 2002 JO_{67} | — | May 9, 2002 | Socorro | LINEAR | · | 1.3 km | MPC · JPL |
| 141652 | 2002 JL_{71} | — | May 8, 2002 | Socorro | LINEAR | · | 1.3 km | MPC · JPL |
| 141653 | 2002 JN_{71} | — | May 8, 2002 | Socorro | LINEAR | · | 1.5 km | MPC · JPL |
| 141654 | 2002 JS_{71} | — | May 8, 2002 | Socorro | LINEAR | · | 1.5 km | MPC · JPL |
| 141655 | 2002 JP_{73} | — | May 8, 2002 | Socorro | LINEAR | · | 1.2 km | MPC · JPL |
| 141656 | 2002 JQ_{73} | — | May 8, 2002 | Socorro | LINEAR | · | 1.5 km | MPC · JPL |
| 141657 | 2002 JS_{75} | — | May 10, 2002 | Socorro | LINEAR | · | 1.1 km | MPC · JPL |
| 141658 | 2002 JC_{76} | — | May 11, 2002 | Socorro | LINEAR | · | 1.1 km | MPC · JPL |
| 141659 | 2002 JB_{79} | — | May 11, 2002 | Socorro | LINEAR | · | 1.2 km | MPC · JPL |
| 141660 | 2002 JK_{81} | — | May 11, 2002 | Socorro | LINEAR | · | 1.2 km | MPC · JPL |
| 141661 | 2002 JR_{82} | — | May 11, 2002 | Socorro | LINEAR | · | 1.4 km | MPC · JPL |
| 141662 | 2002 JX_{83} | — | May 11, 2002 | Socorro | LINEAR | · | 640 m | MPC · JPL |
| 141663 | 2002 JX_{86} | — | May 11, 2002 | Socorro | LINEAR | · | 1.2 km | MPC · JPL |
| 141664 | 2002 JQ_{88} | — | May 11, 2002 | Socorro | LINEAR | · | 1.2 km | MPC · JPL |
| 141665 | 2002 JG_{89} | — | May 11, 2002 | Socorro | LINEAR | · | 980 m | MPC · JPL |
| 141666 | 2002 JV_{92} | — | May 11, 2002 | Socorro | LINEAR | · | 1.7 km | MPC · JPL |
| 141667 | 2002 JN_{93} | — | May 11, 2002 | Socorro | LINEAR | · | 1.1 km | MPC · JPL |
| 141668 | 2002 JR_{94} | — | May 11, 2002 | Socorro | LINEAR | · | 1.5 km | MPC · JPL |
| 141669 | 2002 JV_{95} | — | May 11, 2002 | Socorro | LINEAR | · | 990 m | MPC · JPL |
| 141670 | 2002 JS_{100} | — | May 15, 2002 | Socorro | LINEAR | AMO +1km | 1.5 km | MPC · JPL |
| 141671 | 2002 JV_{101} | — | May 9, 2002 | Socorro | LINEAR | PHO | 1.2 km | MPC · JPL |
| 141672 | 2002 JP_{103} | — | May 10, 2002 | Socorro | LINEAR | · | 930 m | MPC · JPL |
| 141673 | 2002 JB_{105} | — | May 12, 2002 | Socorro | LINEAR | · | 1.1 km | MPC · JPL |
| 141674 | 2002 JC_{105} | — | May 12, 2002 | Socorro | LINEAR | · | 1.1 km | MPC · JPL |
| 141675 | 2002 JO_{105} | — | May 12, 2002 | Socorro | LINEAR | · | 1.7 km | MPC · JPL |
| 141676 | 2002 JV_{105} | — | May 12, 2002 | Socorro | LINEAR | · | 1.4 km | MPC · JPL |
| 141677 | 2002 JC_{110} | — | May 11, 2002 | Socorro | LINEAR | · | 1.2 km | MPC · JPL |
| 141678 | 2002 JM_{111} | — | May 11, 2002 | Socorro | LINEAR | · | 1.5 km | MPC · JPL |
| 141679 | 2002 JW_{111} | — | May 11, 2002 | Socorro | LINEAR | · | 1.4 km | MPC · JPL |
| 141680 | 2002 JT_{112} | — | May 13, 2002 | Socorro | LINEAR | · | 1.5 km | MPC · JPL |
| 141681 | 2002 JU_{112} | — | May 13, 2002 | Socorro | LINEAR | · | 1.2 km | MPC · JPL |
| 141682 | 2002 JZ_{112} | — | May 15, 2002 | Socorro | LINEAR | · | 1.4 km | MPC · JPL |
| 141683 | 2002 JG_{125} | — | May 7, 2002 | Palomar | NEAT | · | 1.5 km | MPC · JPL |
| 141684 | 2002 JS_{126} | — | May 7, 2002 | Palomar | NEAT | · | 1.5 km | MPC · JPL |
| 141685 | 2002 JG_{130} | — | May 8, 2002 | Socorro | LINEAR | · | 1.1 km | MPC · JPL |
| 141686 | 2002 JX_{130} | — | May 8, 2002 | Kitt Peak | Spacewatch | · | 720 m | MPC · JPL |
| 141687 | 2002 JB_{132} | — | May 9, 2002 | Socorro | LINEAR | · | 1.3 km | MPC · JPL |
| 141688 | 2002 JE_{133} | — | May 9, 2002 | Socorro | LINEAR | · | 1.8 km | MPC · JPL |
| 141689 | 2002 JN_{139} | — | May 10, 2002 | Palomar | NEAT | · | 1.3 km | MPC · JPL |
| 141690 | 2002 JM_{143} | — | May 13, 2002 | Socorro | LINEAR | · | 960 m | MPC · JPL |
| 141691 | 2002 JB_{146} | — | May 15, 2002 | Socorro | LINEAR | MAR | 1.8 km | MPC · JPL |
| 141692 | 2002 JN_{146} | — | May 15, 2002 | Haleakala | NEAT | · | 1.6 km | MPC · JPL |
| 141693 | 2002 JZ_{146} | — | May 7, 2002 | Palomar | NEAT | V | 1.1 km | MPC · JPL |
| 141694 | 2002 JW_{147} | — | May 11, 2002 | Socorro | LINEAR | · | 1.1 km | MPC · JPL |
| 141695 | 2002 KU_{2} | — | May 18, 2002 | Palomar | NEAT | · | 780 m | MPC · JPL |
| 141696 | 2002 KE_{4} | — | May 18, 2002 | Socorro | LINEAR | PHO | 1.7 km | MPC · JPL |
| 141697 | 2002 KQ_{5} | — | May 16, 2002 | Socorro | LINEAR | · | 1.1 km | MPC · JPL |
| 141698 | 2002 KP_{8} | — | May 29, 2002 | Haleakala | NEAT | · | 1.2 km | MPC · JPL |
| 141699 | 2002 KY_{10} | — | May 16, 2002 | Palomar | NEAT | · | 4.3 km | MPC · JPL |
| 141700 | 2002 KJ_{11} | — | May 17, 2002 | Palomar | NEAT | · | 1.4 km | MPC · JPL |

== 141701–141800 ==
back to top

| Designation | | | Discovery | | | Properties | | Ref |
| Permanent | Provisional | Named after | Date | Site | Discoverer(s) | Category | Diam. | Ref |
|---|---|---|---|---|---|---|---|---|
| 141701 | 2002 KM_{15} | — | May 30, 2002 | Palomar | NEAT | 3:2 · SHU | 5.1 km | MPC · JPL |
| 141702 | 2002 LG_{4} | — | June 5, 2002 | Socorro | LINEAR | · | 1.0 km | MPC · JPL |
| 141703 | 2002 LJ_{4} | — | June 5, 2002 | Socorro | LINEAR | · | 1.5 km | MPC · JPL |
| 141704 | 2002 LK_{4} | — | June 5, 2002 | Socorro | LINEAR | · | 1.5 km | MPC · JPL |
| 141705 | 2002 LA_{5} | — | June 4, 2002 | Palomar | NEAT | · | 1.4 km | MPC · JPL |
| 141706 | 2002 LC_{6} | — | June 7, 2002 | Kitt Peak | Spacewatch | · | 2.6 km | MPC · JPL |
| 141707 | 2002 LD_{7} | — | June 2, 2002 | Palomar | NEAT | · | 1.5 km | MPC · JPL |
| 141708 | 2002 LU_{7} | — | June 6, 2002 | Socorro | LINEAR | · | 1.2 km | MPC · JPL |
| 141709 | 2002 LP_{8} | — | June 5, 2002 | Socorro | LINEAR | · | 1.3 km | MPC · JPL |
| 141710 | 2002 LQ_{8} | — | June 5, 2002 | Socorro | LINEAR | · | 1.8 km | MPC · JPL |
| 141711 | 2002 LX_{9} | — | June 5, 2002 | Socorro | LINEAR | · | 1.4 km | MPC · JPL |
| 141712 | 2002 LY_{9} | — | June 5, 2002 | Socorro | LINEAR | · | 1.5 km | MPC · JPL |
| 141713 | 2002 LB_{10} | — | June 5, 2002 | Socorro | LINEAR | · | 1.0 km | MPC · JPL |
| 141714 | 2002 LS_{12} | — | June 5, 2002 | Socorro | LINEAR | · | 1.6 km | MPC · JPL |
| 141715 | 2002 LJ_{13} | — | June 6, 2002 | Socorro | LINEAR | · | 2.6 km | MPC · JPL |
| 141716 | 2002 LU_{13} | — | June 6, 2002 | Socorro | LINEAR | · | 1.1 km | MPC · JPL |
| 141717 | 2002 LC_{14} | — | June 6, 2002 | Socorro | LINEAR | NYS | 1.2 km | MPC · JPL |
| 141718 | 2002 LV_{17} | — | June 6, 2002 | Socorro | LINEAR | · | 1.6 km | MPC · JPL |
| 141719 | 2002 LA_{19} | — | June 6, 2002 | Socorro | LINEAR | · | 1.6 km | MPC · JPL |
| 141720 | 2002 LS_{19} | — | June 6, 2002 | Socorro | LINEAR | · | 1.4 km | MPC · JPL |
| 141721 | 2002 LY_{19} | — | June 6, 2002 | Socorro | LINEAR | NYS | 1.9 km | MPC · JPL |
| 141722 | 2002 LS_{20} | — | June 6, 2002 | Socorro | LINEAR | · | 1.3 km | MPC · JPL |
| 141723 | 2002 LB_{21} | — | June 6, 2002 | Socorro | LINEAR | · | 1.1 km | MPC · JPL |
| 141724 | 2002 LG_{21} | — | June 6, 2002 | Socorro | LINEAR | · | 1.7 km | MPC · JPL |
| 141725 | 2002 LU_{21} | — | June 8, 2002 | Socorro | LINEAR | · | 1.2 km | MPC · JPL |
| 141726 | 2002 LA_{22} | — | June 8, 2002 | Socorro | LINEAR | MAS | 1.1 km | MPC · JPL |
| 141727 | 2002 LQ_{22} | — | June 8, 2002 | Socorro | LINEAR | · | 1.5 km | MPC · JPL |
| 141728 | 2002 LK_{23} | — | June 8, 2002 | Socorro | LINEAR | · | 1.5 km | MPC · JPL |
| 141729 | 2002 LN_{23} | — | June 8, 2002 | Socorro | LINEAR | PHO | 5.6 km | MPC · JPL |
| 141730 | 2002 LY_{23} | — | June 8, 2002 | Socorro | LINEAR | · | 2.3 km | MPC · JPL |
| 141731 | 2002 LF_{24} | — | June 9, 2002 | Desert Eagle | W. K. Y. Yeung | · | 1.8 km | MPC · JPL |
| 141732 | 2002 LU_{25} | — | June 5, 2002 | Socorro | LINEAR | · | 1.7 km | MPC · JPL |
| 141733 | 2002 LN_{27} | — | June 8, 2002 | Socorro | LINEAR | ERI | 2.6 km | MPC · JPL |
| 141734 | 2002 LK_{28} | — | June 9, 2002 | Socorro | LINEAR | · | 1.3 km | MPC · JPL |
| 141735 | 2002 LO_{28} | — | June 9, 2002 | Socorro | LINEAR | · | 1.3 km | MPC · JPL |
| 141736 | 2002 LC_{29} | — | June 9, 2002 | Socorro | LINEAR | · | 1.5 km | MPC · JPL |
| 141737 | 2002 LD_{29} | — | June 9, 2002 | Socorro | LINEAR | · | 2.0 km | MPC · JPL |
| 141738 | 2002 LM_{29} | — | June 9, 2002 | Socorro | LINEAR | · | 1.4 km | MPC · JPL |
| 141739 | 2002 LO_{30} | — | June 2, 2002 | Palomar | NEAT | · | 1.1 km | MPC · JPL |
| 141740 | 2002 LO_{31} | — | June 6, 2002 | Socorro | LINEAR | · | 1.5 km | MPC · JPL |
| 141741 | 2002 LP_{36} | — | June 9, 2002 | Socorro | LINEAR | PHO | 2.2 km | MPC · JPL |
| 141742 | 2002 LT_{36} | — | June 9, 2002 | Socorro | LINEAR | · | 1.7 km | MPC · JPL |
| 141743 | 2002 LD_{37} | — | June 10, 2002 | Socorro | LINEAR | V | 1.1 km | MPC · JPL |
| 141744 | 2002 LZ_{37} | — | June 12, 2002 | Socorro | LINEAR | H | 1.0 km | MPC · JPL |
| 141745 | 2002 LA_{40} | — | June 10, 2002 | Socorro | LINEAR | PHO | 1.5 km | MPC · JPL |
| 141746 | 2002 LO_{44} | — | June 4, 2002 | Palomar | NEAT | NYS | 1.3 km | MPC · JPL |
| 141747 | 2002 LO_{45} | — | June 6, 2002 | Kitt Peak | Spacewatch | · | 1.4 km | MPC · JPL |
| 141748 | 2002 LK_{47} | — | June 11, 2002 | Socorro | LINEAR | · | 1.4 km | MPC · JPL |
| 141749 | 2002 LW_{47} | — | June 13, 2002 | Socorro | LINEAR | PHO | 1.7 km | MPC · JPL |
| 141750 | 2002 LG_{50} | — | June 8, 2002 | Haleakala | NEAT | · | 1.2 km | MPC · JPL |
| 141751 | 2002 LM_{51} | — | June 9, 2002 | Socorro | LINEAR | EUN | 3.2 km | MPC · JPL |
| 141752 | 2002 LK_{52} | — | June 9, 2002 | Socorro | LINEAR | · | 2.2 km | MPC · JPL |
| 141753 | 2002 LL_{53} | — | June 9, 2002 | Palomar | NEAT | · | 1.4 km | MPC · JPL |
| 141754 | 2002 LU_{53} | — | June 10, 2002 | Socorro | LINEAR | · | 1.3 km | MPC · JPL |
| 141755 | 2002 LN_{55} | — | June 11, 2002 | Socorro | LINEAR | · | 1.2 km | MPC · JPL |
| 141756 | 2002 LP_{58} | — | June 8, 2002 | Haleakala | NEAT | · | 1.5 km | MPC · JPL |
| 141757 | 2002 LY_{58} | — | June 8, 2002 | Socorro | LINEAR | V | 1.0 km | MPC · JPL |
| 141758 | 2002 LK_{60} | — | June 12, 2002 | Socorro | LINEAR | · | 1.8 km | MPC · JPL |
| 141759 | 2002 LC_{61} | — | June 11, 2002 | Palomar | NEAT | · | 1.0 km | MPC · JPL |
| 141760 | 2002 LQ_{61} | — | June 11, 2002 | Palomar | NEAT | · | 1.6 km | MPC · JPL |
| 141761 | 2002 MC | — | June 16, 2002 | Socorro | LINEAR | AMO +1km | 1.2 km | MPC · JPL |
| 141762 | 2002 MR | — | June 18, 2002 | Reedy Creek | J. Broughton | NYS | 1.9 km | MPC · JPL |
| 141763 | 2002 ML_{1} | — | June 19, 2002 | Socorro | LINEAR | PHO | 1.6 km | MPC · JPL |
| 141764 | 2002 MG_{2} | — | June 16, 2002 | Palomar | NEAT | · | 1.1 km | MPC · JPL |
| 141765 | 2002 MP_{3} | — | June 30, 2002 | Palomar | NEAT | AMO +1km | 1.9 km | MPC · JPL |
| 141766 | 2002 MB_{4} | — | June 17, 2002 | Palomar | NEAT | NYS | 1.5 km | MPC · JPL |
| 141767 | 2002 NL_{1} | — | July 4, 2002 | Palomar | NEAT | MAS | 1.3 km | MPC · JPL |
| 141768 | 2002 NG_{2} | — | July 4, 2002 | Palomar | NEAT | V | 1.2 km | MPC · JPL |
| 141769 | 2002 NN_{2} | — | July 6, 2002 | Palomar | NEAT | · | 5.5 km | MPC · JPL |
| 141770 | 2002 NS_{2} | — | July 8, 2002 | Reedy Creek | J. Broughton | NYS | 1.7 km | MPC · JPL |
| 141771 | 2002 NC_{4} | — | July 1, 2002 | Palomar | NEAT | NYS | 1.3 km | MPC · JPL |
| 141772 Lucapeyron | 2002 NM_{5} | Lucapeyron | July 10, 2002 | Campo Imperatore | CINEOS | · | 1.2 km | MPC · JPL |
| 141773 | 2002 NW_{6} | — | July 8, 2002 | Palomar | NEAT | V | 1.1 km | MPC · JPL |
| 141774 | 2002 NG_{8} | — | July 9, 2002 | Socorro | LINEAR | PHO | 1.5 km | MPC · JPL |
| 141775 | 2002 NR_{8} | — | July 1, 2002 | Palomar | NEAT | · | 2.1 km | MPC · JPL |
| 141776 | 2002 NY_{8} | — | July 1, 2002 | Palomar | NEAT | · | 1.9 km | MPC · JPL |
| 141777 | 2002 ND_{10} | — | July 4, 2002 | Palomar | NEAT | · | 1.9 km | MPC · JPL |
| 141778 | 2002 NE_{10} | — | July 4, 2002 | Palomar | NEAT | NYS | 1.7 km | MPC · JPL |
| 141779 | 2002 NP_{10} | — | July 4, 2002 | Palomar | NEAT | NYS | 1.5 km | MPC · JPL |
| 141780 | 2002 NY_{11} | — | July 4, 2002 | Kitt Peak | Spacewatch | · | 1.8 km | MPC · JPL |
| 141781 | 2002 NG_{12} | — | July 4, 2002 | Palomar | NEAT | · | 1.8 km | MPC · JPL |
| 141782 | 2002 NN_{12} | — | July 4, 2002 | Palomar | NEAT | NYS | 2.1 km | MPC · JPL |
| 141783 | 2002 NY_{12} | — | July 4, 2002 | Palomar | NEAT | NYS | 1.4 km | MPC · JPL |
| 141784 | 2002 NV_{13} | — | July 4, 2002 | Palomar | NEAT | · | 2.6 km | MPC · JPL |
| 141785 | 2002 ND_{14} | — | July 4, 2002 | Palomar | NEAT | · | 1.9 km | MPC · JPL |
| 141786 | 2002 NW_{14} | — | July 5, 2002 | Socorro | LINEAR | · | 1.1 km | MPC · JPL |
| 141787 | 2002 NE_{20} | — | July 9, 2002 | Socorro | LINEAR | (31811) | 4.3 km | MPC · JPL |
| 141788 | 2002 NL_{20} | — | July 9, 2002 | Socorro | LINEAR | V | 910 m | MPC · JPL |
| 141789 | 2002 NS_{20} | — | July 9, 2002 | Socorro | LINEAR | · | 6.1 km | MPC · JPL |
| 141790 | 2002 NP_{21} | — | July 9, 2002 | Socorro | LINEAR | · | 1.2 km | MPC · JPL |
| 141791 | 2002 NK_{22} | — | July 9, 2002 | Socorro | LINEAR | · | 1.7 km | MPC · JPL |
| 141792 | 2002 NH_{23} | — | July 9, 2002 | Socorro | LINEAR | · | 930 m | MPC · JPL |
| 141793 | 2002 NK_{23} | — | July 9, 2002 | Socorro | LINEAR | · | 1.3 km | MPC · JPL |
| 141794 | 2002 NP_{23} | — | July 9, 2002 | Socorro | LINEAR | · | 1.1 km | MPC · JPL |
| 141795 | 2002 NJ_{26} | — | July 9, 2002 | Socorro | LINEAR | · | 1.8 km | MPC · JPL |
| 141796 | 2002 NO_{26} | — | July 9, 2002 | Socorro | LINEAR | V | 1.4 km | MPC · JPL |
| 141797 | 2002 ND_{29} | — | July 13, 2002 | Haleakala | NEAT | · | 2.2 km | MPC · JPL |
| 141798 | 2002 NQ_{30} | — | July 6, 2002 | Anderson Mesa | LONEOS | · | 1.9 km | MPC · JPL |
| 141799 | 2002 NS_{31} | — | July 9, 2002 | Palomar | NEAT | · | 1.3 km | MPC · JPL |
| 141800 | 2002 NO_{33} | — | July 14, 2002 | Socorro | LINEAR | EUN | 2.4 km | MPC · JPL |

== 141801–141900 ==
back to top

| Designation | | | Discovery | | | Properties | | Ref |
| Permanent | Provisional | Named after | Date | Site | Discoverer(s) | Category | Diam. | Ref |
|---|---|---|---|---|---|---|---|---|
| 141801 | 2002 NH_{35} | — | July 9, 2002 | Socorro | LINEAR | · | 2.0 km | MPC · JPL |
| 141802 | 2002 NV_{35} | — | July 9, 2002 | Socorro | LINEAR | V | 840 m | MPC · JPL |
| 141803 | 2002 NY_{35} | — | July 9, 2002 | Socorro | LINEAR | V | 1.2 km | MPC · JPL |
| 141804 | 2002 NJ_{36} | — | July 9, 2002 | Socorro | LINEAR | · | 2.5 km | MPC · JPL |
| 141805 | 2002 NO_{36} | — | July 9, 2002 | Socorro | LINEAR | · | 1.8 km | MPC · JPL |
| 141806 | 2002 NF_{38} | — | July 9, 2002 | Socorro | LINEAR | · | 3.2 km | MPC · JPL |
| 141807 | 2002 NM_{38} | — | July 9, 2002 | Socorro | LINEAR | · | 3.5 km | MPC · JPL |
| 141808 | 2002 NV_{38} | — | July 14, 2002 | Socorro | LINEAR | fast | 1.7 km | MPC · JPL |
| 141809 | 2002 NB_{39} | — | July 11, 2002 | Socorro | LINEAR | · | 3.6 km | MPC · JPL |
| 141810 | 2002 NB_{40} | — | July 14, 2002 | Palomar | NEAT | · | 1.2 km | MPC · JPL |
| 141811 | 2002 NL_{42} | — | July 14, 2002 | Palomar | NEAT | NYS | 1.6 km | MPC · JPL |
| 141812 | 2002 NE_{43} | — | July 15, 2002 | Palomar | NEAT | · | 1.4 km | MPC · JPL |
| 141813 | 2002 NN_{44} | — | July 12, 2002 | Palomar | NEAT | · | 2.4 km | MPC · JPL |
| 141814 | 2002 NP_{44} | — | July 12, 2002 | Palomar | NEAT | · | 1.7 km | MPC · JPL |
| 141815 | 2002 NX_{44} | — | July 12, 2002 | Palomar | NEAT | · | 2.2 km | MPC · JPL |
| 141816 | 2002 NY_{45} | — | July 13, 2002 | Palomar | NEAT | NYS | 1.5 km | MPC · JPL |
| 141817 | 2002 ND_{46} | — | July 13, 2002 | Palomar | NEAT | · | 2.1 km | MPC · JPL |
| 141818 | 2002 NH_{46} | — | July 13, 2002 | Palomar | NEAT | · | 980 m | MPC · JPL |
| 141819 | 2002 NA_{49} | — | July 14, 2002 | Palomar | NEAT | V | 1.1 km | MPC · JPL |
| 141820 | 2002 ND_{51} | — | July 4, 2002 | Palomar | NEAT | NYS | 1.8 km | MPC · JPL |
| 141821 | 2002 NN_{51} | — | July 5, 2002 | Socorro | LINEAR | · | 2.1 km | MPC · JPL |
| 141822 | 2002 NO_{53} | — | July 14, 2002 | Palomar | NEAT | · | 1.7 km | MPC · JPL |
| 141823 | 2002 NS_{53} | — | July 14, 2002 | Palomar | NEAT | · | 1.2 km | MPC · JPL |
| 141824 | 2002 NU_{53} | — | July 14, 2002 | Palomar | NEAT | · | 1.0 km | MPC · JPL |
| 141825 | 2002 NG_{54} | — | July 5, 2002 | Socorro | LINEAR | V | 1.2 km | MPC · JPL |
| 141826 | 2002 NH_{54} | — | July 5, 2002 | Socorro | LINEAR | · | 2.5 km | MPC · JPL |
| 141827 | 2002 NO_{54} | — | July 5, 2002 | Socorro | LINEAR | · | 1.9 km | MPC · JPL |
| 141828 | 2002 NV_{59} | — | July 8, 2002 | Palomar | NEAT | · | 1.8 km | MPC · JPL |
| 141829 | 2002 OC | — | July 16, 2002 | Reedy Creek | J. Broughton | · | 1.9 km | MPC · JPL |
| 141830 | 2002 OH | — | July 16, 2002 | Palomar | NEAT | · | 1.9 km | MPC · JPL |
| 141831 | 2002 OV_{4} | — | July 17, 2002 | Palomar | NEAT | · | 1.6 km | MPC · JPL |
| 141832 | 2002 OY_{7} | — | July 18, 2002 | Palomar | NEAT | · | 1.8 km | MPC · JPL |
| 141833 | 2002 ON_{8} | — | July 19, 2002 | Palomar | NEAT | · | 2.0 km | MPC · JPL |
| 141834 | 2002 OT_{9} | — | July 21, 2002 | Palomar | NEAT | · | 2.5 km | MPC · JPL |
| 141835 | 2002 OB_{11} | — | July 22, 2002 | Palomar | NEAT | NYS | 1.5 km | MPC · JPL |
| 141836 | 2002 ON_{16} | — | July 18, 2002 | Socorro | LINEAR | · | 1.3 km | MPC · JPL |
| 141837 | 2002 OT_{16} | — | July 18, 2002 | Socorro | LINEAR | · | 2.0 km | MPC · JPL |
| 141838 | 2002 OE_{17} | — | July 18, 2002 | Socorro | LINEAR | · | 2.1 km | MPC · JPL |
| 141839 | 2002 OT_{20} | — | July 22, 2002 | Palomar | NEAT | NYS | 2.0 km | MPC · JPL |
| 141840 | 2002 OU_{20} | — | July 22, 2002 | Palomar | NEAT | NYS | 1.8 km | MPC · JPL |
| 141841 | 2002 OD_{21} | — | July 22, 2002 | Palomar | NEAT | · | 1.9 km | MPC · JPL |
| 141842 | 2002 OS_{21} | — | July 18, 2002 | Palomar | NEAT | MAS | 1.1 km | MPC · JPL |
| 141843 | 2002 OE_{22} | — | July 22, 2002 | Palomar | NEAT | · | 1.5 km | MPC · JPL |
| 141844 | 2002 OL_{22} | — | July 31, 2002 | Reedy Creek | J. Broughton | NYS | 2.2 km | MPC · JPL |
| 141845 | 2002 OJ_{23} | — | July 26, 2002 | Palomar | NEAT | · | 990 m | MPC · JPL |
| 141846 | 2002 OE_{26} | — | July 17, 2002 | Palomar | NEAT | · | 2.2 km | MPC · JPL |
| 141847 | 2002 OG_{26} | — | July 30, 2002 | Haleakala | NEAT | · | 1.7 km | MPC · JPL |
| 141848 | 2002 OE_{27} | — | July 18, 2002 | Palomar | NEAT | · | 880 m | MPC · JPL |
| 141849 | 2002 PC | — | August 1, 2002 | Reedy Creek | J. Broughton | · | 2.2 km | MPC · JPL |
| 141850 | 2002 PY_{4} | — | August 4, 2002 | Palomar | NEAT | · | 3.9 km | MPC · JPL |
| 141851 | 2002 PM_{6} | — | August 6, 2002 | Socorro | LINEAR | APO +1km · PHA | 970 m | MPC · JPL |
| 141852 | 2002 PU_{8} | — | August 5, 2002 | Palomar | NEAT | · | 1.2 km | MPC · JPL |
| 141853 | 2002 PD_{9} | — | August 5, 2002 | Palomar | NEAT | · | 2.0 km | MPC · JPL |
| 141854 | 2002 PU_{9} | — | August 5, 2002 | Palomar | NEAT | · | 2.2 km | MPC · JPL |
| 141855 | 2002 PP_{10} | — | August 5, 2002 | Palomar | NEAT | · | 2.0 km | MPC · JPL |
| 141856 | 2002 PW_{11} | — | August 3, 2002 | Palomar | NEAT | · | 1.1 km | MPC · JPL |
| 141857 | 2002 PS_{14} | — | August 6, 2002 | Palomar | NEAT | · | 2.2 km | MPC · JPL |
| 141858 | 2002 PO_{17} | — | August 6, 2002 | Palomar | NEAT | NYS | 1.7 km | MPC · JPL |
| 141859 | 2002 PC_{18} | — | August 6, 2002 | Palomar | NEAT | NYS | 1.5 km | MPC · JPL |
| 141860 | 2002 PW_{20} | — | August 6, 2002 | Palomar | NEAT | · | 850 m | MPC · JPL |
| 141861 | 2002 PD_{22} | — | August 6, 2002 | Palomar | NEAT | V | 910 m | MPC · JPL |
| 141862 | 2002 PA_{23} | — | August 6, 2002 | Palomar | NEAT | · | 1.5 km | MPC · JPL |
| 141863 | 2002 PJ_{24} | — | August 6, 2002 | Palomar | NEAT | MAS | 1.1 km | MPC · JPL |
| 141864 | 2002 PC_{28} | — | August 6, 2002 | Palomar | NEAT | NYS | 1.7 km | MPC · JPL |
| 141865 | 2002 PN_{28} | — | August 6, 2002 | Palomar | NEAT | · | 2.1 km | MPC · JPL |
| 141866 | 2002 PL_{30} | — | August 6, 2002 | Palomar | NEAT | SUL | 2.9 km | MPC · JPL |
| 141867 | 2002 PY_{30} | — | August 6, 2002 | Palomar | NEAT | NYS | 1.4 km | MPC · JPL |
| 141868 | 2002 PN_{31} | — | August 6, 2002 | Palomar | NEAT | · | 1.6 km | MPC · JPL |
| 141869 | 2002 PK_{32} | — | August 6, 2002 | Palomar | NEAT | NYS | 1.7 km | MPC · JPL |
| 141870 | 2002 PB_{33} | — | August 6, 2002 | Palomar | NEAT | (2076) | 1.0 km | MPC · JPL |
| 141871 | 2002 PZ_{33} | — | August 6, 2002 | Campo Imperatore | CINEOS | MAS | 1.1 km | MPC · JPL |
| 141872 | 2002 PB_{34} | — | August 6, 2002 | Campo Imperatore | CINEOS | NYS | 2.8 km | MPC · JPL |
| 141873 | 2002 PM_{34} | — | August 4, 2002 | Socorro | LINEAR | BAR | 3.0 km | MPC · JPL |
| 141874 | 2002 PO_{34} | — | August 6, 2002 | Palomar | NEAT | AMO +1km | 970 m | MPC · JPL |
| 141875 | 2002 PQ_{35} | — | August 6, 2002 | Palomar | NEAT | MAS | 1.0 km | MPC · JPL |
| 141876 | 2002 PW_{35} | — | August 6, 2002 | Palomar | NEAT | · | 1.2 km | MPC · JPL |
| 141877 | 2002 PX_{38} | — | August 6, 2002 | Palomar | NEAT | NYS | 1.9 km | MPC · JPL |
| 141878 | 2002 PT_{43} | — | August 5, 2002 | Socorro | LINEAR | · | 2.7 km | MPC · JPL |
| 141879 | 2002 PG_{48} | — | August 10, 2002 | Socorro | LINEAR | V | 1.0 km | MPC · JPL |
| 141880 | 2002 PC_{49} | — | August 10, 2002 | Socorro | LINEAR | EUN | 2.2 km | MPC · JPL |
| 141881 | 2002 PM_{49} | — | August 10, 2002 | Socorro | LINEAR | · | 2.2 km | MPC · JPL |
| 141882 | 2002 PO_{50} | — | August 10, 2002 | Socorro | LINEAR | · | 2.7 km | MPC · JPL |
| 141883 | 2002 PZ_{50} | — | August 10, 2002 | Socorro | LINEAR | · | 4.5 km | MPC · JPL |
| 141884 | 2002 PT_{52} | — | August 8, 2002 | Palomar | NEAT | · | 2.1 km | MPC · JPL |
| 141885 | 2002 PZ_{52} | — | August 8, 2002 | Palomar | NEAT | NYS | 2.0 km | MPC · JPL |
| 141886 | 2002 PK_{53} | — | August 8, 2002 | Palomar | NEAT | MAS | 1.1 km | MPC · JPL |
| 141887 | 2002 PR_{53} | — | August 8, 2002 | Palomar | NEAT | · | 1.7 km | MPC · JPL |
| 141888 | 2002 PB_{54} | — | August 8, 2002 | Palomar | NEAT | MAS | 1.1 km | MPC · JPL |
| 141889 | 2002 PU_{54} | — | August 5, 2002 | Socorro | LINEAR | EUN | 2.5 km | MPC · JPL |
| 141890 | 2002 PD_{55} | — | August 9, 2002 | Socorro | LINEAR | NYS | 1.9 km | MPC · JPL |
| 141891 | 2002 PG_{55} | — | August 9, 2002 | Socorro | LINEAR | V | 1.2 km | MPC · JPL |
| 141892 | 2002 PU_{55} | — | August 9, 2002 | Socorro | LINEAR | V | 1.1 km | MPC · JPL |
| 141893 | 2002 PA_{56} | — | August 9, 2002 | Socorro | LINEAR | · | 1.2 km | MPC · JPL |
| 141894 | 2002 PC_{56} | — | August 9, 2002 | Socorro | LINEAR | · | 2.5 km | MPC · JPL |
| 141895 | 2002 PP_{56} | — | August 9, 2002 | Socorro | LINEAR | · | 2.2 km | MPC · JPL |
| 141896 | 2002 PG_{57} | — | August 9, 2002 | Socorro | LINEAR | V | 1.7 km | MPC · JPL |
| 141897 | 2002 PC_{60} | — | August 10, 2002 | Socorro | LINEAR | NYS | 2.4 km | MPC · JPL |
| 141898 | 2002 PC_{62} | — | August 8, 2002 | Palomar | NEAT | · | 1.5 km | MPC · JPL |
| 141899 | 2002 PY_{62} | — | August 8, 2002 | Palomar | NEAT | · | 1.9 km | MPC · JPL |
| 141900 | 2002 PN_{64} | — | August 3, 2002 | Palomar | NEAT | · | 1.1 km | MPC · JPL |

== 141901–142000 ==
back to top

| Designation | | | Discovery | | | Properties | | Ref |
| Permanent | Provisional | Named after | Date | Site | Discoverer(s) | Category | Diam. | Ref |
|---|---|---|---|---|---|---|---|---|
| 141901 | 2002 PO_{65} | — | August 5, 2002 | Palomar | NEAT | · | 1.9 km | MPC · JPL |
| 141902 | 2002 PB_{67} | — | August 6, 2002 | Palomar | NEAT | · | 1.5 km | MPC · JPL |
| 141903 | 2002 PE_{68} | — | August 6, 2002 | Palomar | NEAT | · | 1.5 km | MPC · JPL |
| 141904 | 2002 PH_{70} | — | August 11, 2002 | Socorro | LINEAR | · | 4.0 km | MPC · JPL |
| 141905 | 2002 PG_{72} | — | August 12, 2002 | Socorro | LINEAR | · | 4.1 km | MPC · JPL |
| 141906 | 2002 PJ_{73} | — | August 12, 2002 | Socorro | LINEAR | · | 1.9 km | MPC · JPL |
| 141907 | 2002 PG_{75} | — | August 12, 2002 | Socorro | LINEAR | · | 2.0 km | MPC · JPL |
| 141908 | 2002 PC_{77} | — | August 11, 2002 | Palomar | NEAT | · | 1.8 km | MPC · JPL |
| 141909 | 2002 PA_{78} | — | August 11, 2002 | Palomar | NEAT | · | 1.5 km | MPC · JPL |
| 141910 | 2002 PL_{78} | — | August 11, 2002 | Palomar | NEAT | · | 1.2 km | MPC · JPL |
| 141911 | 2002 PQ_{79} | — | August 13, 2002 | Fountain Hills | C. W. Juels, P. R. Holvorcem | · | 1.5 km | MPC · JPL |
| 141912 | 2002 PN_{80} | — | August 11, 2002 | Palomar | NEAT | · | 2.2 km | MPC · JPL |
| 141913 | 2002 PP_{80} | — | August 11, 2002 | Palomar | NEAT | NYS | 1.5 km | MPC · JPL |
| 141914 | 2002 PW_{80} | — | August 11, 2002 | Palomar | NEAT | KOR | 2.2 km | MPC · JPL |
| 141915 | 2002 PX_{80} | — | August 11, 2002 | Palomar | NEAT | · | 3.3 km | MPC · JPL |
| 141916 | 2002 PF_{82} | — | August 9, 2002 | Socorro | LINEAR | · | 1.5 km | MPC · JPL |
| 141917 | 2002 PK_{82} | — | August 9, 2002 | Socorro | LINEAR | · | 1.7 km | MPC · JPL |
| 141918 | 2002 PS_{82} | — | August 10, 2002 | Socorro | LINEAR | · | 4.0 km | MPC · JPL |
| 141919 | 2002 PT_{82} | — | August 10, 2002 | Socorro | LINEAR | NYS | 2.3 km | MPC · JPL |
| 141920 | 2002 PU_{82} | — | August 10, 2002 | Socorro | LINEAR | · | 2.1 km | MPC · JPL |
| 141921 | 2002 PY_{82} | — | August 10, 2002 | Socorro | LINEAR | · | 2.5 km | MPC · JPL |
| 141922 | 2002 PC_{84} | — | August 10, 2002 | Socorro | LINEAR | NYS | 2.2 km | MPC · JPL |
| 141923 | 2002 PS_{84} | — | August 10, 2002 | Socorro | LINEAR | NYS | 2.4 km | MPC · JPL |
| 141924 | 2002 PU_{84} | — | August 10, 2002 | Socorro | LINEAR | NYS | 2.2 km | MPC · JPL |
| 141925 | 2002 PX_{85} | — | August 13, 2002 | Socorro | LINEAR | · | 2.0 km | MPC · JPL |
| 141926 | 2002 PV_{86} | — | August 14, 2002 | Reedy Creek | J. Broughton | NYS | 2.2 km | MPC · JPL |
| 141927 | 2002 PY_{86} | — | August 13, 2002 | El Centro | W. K. Y. Yeung | · | 2.1 km | MPC · JPL |
| 141928 | 2002 PA_{87} | — | August 4, 2002 | Palomar | NEAT | · | 2.0 km | MPC · JPL |
| 141929 | 2002 PD_{88} | — | August 12, 2002 | Socorro | LINEAR | MAS | 1.0 km | MPC · JPL |
| 141930 | 2002 PH_{88} | — | August 12, 2002 | Socorro | LINEAR | · | 2.2 km | MPC · JPL |
| 141931 | 2002 PN_{92} | — | August 14, 2002 | Socorro | LINEAR | · | 2.4 km | MPC · JPL |
| 141932 | 2002 PC_{94} | — | August 11, 2002 | Haleakala | NEAT | NYS | 1.5 km | MPC · JPL |
| 141933 | 2002 PF_{94} | — | August 11, 2002 | Haleakala | NEAT | · | 2.5 km | MPC · JPL |
| 141934 | 2002 PL_{94} | — | August 12, 2002 | Socorro | LINEAR | · | 1.8 km | MPC · JPL |
| 141935 | 2002 PN_{94} | — | August 12, 2002 | Haleakala | NEAT | · | 3.2 km | MPC · JPL |
| 141936 | 2002 PM_{95} | — | August 14, 2002 | Socorro | LINEAR | NYS | 1.9 km | MPC · JPL |
| 141937 | 2002 PS_{95} | — | August 14, 2002 | Socorro | LINEAR | · | 2.0 km | MPC · JPL |
| 141938 | 2002 PV_{95} | — | August 14, 2002 | Socorro | LINEAR | NYS | 2.0 km | MPC · JPL |
| 141939 | 2002 PH_{96} | — | August 14, 2002 | Socorro | LINEAR | MAS | 1.2 km | MPC · JPL |
| 141940 | 2002 PJ_{96} | — | August 14, 2002 | Socorro | LINEAR | · | 2.2 km | MPC · JPL |
| 141941 | 2002 PW_{97} | — | August 14, 2002 | Socorro | LINEAR | · | 2.1 km | MPC · JPL |
| 141942 | 2002 PU_{99} | — | August 14, 2002 | Socorro | LINEAR | NYS | 1.6 km | MPC · JPL |
| 141943 | 2002 PF_{100} | — | August 14, 2002 | Socorro | LINEAR | · | 2.3 km | MPC · JPL |
| 141944 | 2002 PZ_{101} | — | August 12, 2002 | Socorro | LINEAR | · | 4.0 km | MPC · JPL |
| 141945 | 2002 PR_{106} | — | August 12, 2002 | Socorro | LINEAR | · | 2.2 km | MPC · JPL |
| 141946 | 2002 PF_{107} | — | August 12, 2002 | Anderson Mesa | LONEOS | · | 1.1 km | MPC · JPL |
| 141947 | 2002 PN_{108} | — | August 13, 2002 | Socorro | LINEAR | · | 1.7 km | MPC · JPL |
| 141948 | 2002 PK_{110} | — | August 13, 2002 | Socorro | LINEAR | · | 2.2 km | MPC · JPL |
| 141949 | 2002 PN_{110} | — | August 13, 2002 | Anderson Mesa | LONEOS | · | 6.6 km | MPC · JPL |
| 141950 | 2002 PC_{111} | — | August 13, 2002 | Anderson Mesa | LONEOS | · | 1.3 km | MPC · JPL |
| 141951 | 2002 PH_{111} | — | August 14, 2002 | Palomar | NEAT | · | 1.9 km | MPC · JPL |
| 141952 | 2002 PR_{111} | — | August 14, 2002 | Socorro | LINEAR | V | 1.2 km | MPC · JPL |
| 141953 | 2002 PU_{113} | — | August 12, 2002 | Socorro | LINEAR | MAS | 1.1 km | MPC · JPL |
| 141954 | 2002 PZ_{113} | — | August 12, 2002 | Anderson Mesa | LONEOS | MAS | 1.1 km | MPC · JPL |
| 141955 | 2002 PP_{115} | — | August 13, 2002 | Anderson Mesa | LONEOS | · | 2.6 km | MPC · JPL |
| 141956 | 2002 PS_{115} | — | August 13, 2002 | Socorro | LINEAR | · | 4.6 km | MPC · JPL |
| 141957 | 2002 PU_{116} | — | August 14, 2002 | Anderson Mesa | LONEOS | · | 2.2 km | MPC · JPL |
| 141958 | 2002 PV_{116} | — | August 14, 2002 | Anderson Mesa | LONEOS | ERI | 2.5 km | MPC · JPL |
| 141959 | 2002 PV_{117} | — | August 12, 2002 | Haleakala | NEAT | · | 1.0 km | MPC · JPL |
| 141960 | 2002 PF_{118} | — | August 13, 2002 | Anderson Mesa | LONEOS | · | 1.9 km | MPC · JPL |
| 141961 | 2002 PL_{119} | — | August 13, 2002 | Anderson Mesa | LONEOS | V | 1.1 km | MPC · JPL |
| 141962 | 2002 PC_{120} | — | August 13, 2002 | Anderson Mesa | LONEOS | V | 830 m | MPC · JPL |
| 141963 | 2002 PL_{120} | — | August 13, 2002 | Anderson Mesa | LONEOS | V | 1.3 km | MPC · JPL |
| 141964 | 2002 PV_{120} | — | August 13, 2002 | Anderson Mesa | LONEOS | · | 1.1 km | MPC · JPL |
| 141965 | 2002 PA_{121} | — | August 13, 2002 | Anderson Mesa | LONEOS | V | 1.0 km | MPC · JPL |
| 141966 | 2002 PV_{122} | — | August 14, 2002 | Anderson Mesa | LONEOS | · | 2.3 km | MPC · JPL |
| 141967 | 2002 PD_{124} | — | August 13, 2002 | Socorro | LINEAR | · | 2.2 km | MPC · JPL |
| 141968 | 2002 PL_{124} | — | August 13, 2002 | Anderson Mesa | LONEOS | MAS | 1.4 km | MPC · JPL |
| 141969 | 2002 PO_{124} | — | August 13, 2002 | Anderson Mesa | LONEOS | PHO | 3.5 km | MPC · JPL |
| 141970 | 2002 PL_{125} | — | August 14, 2002 | Socorro | LINEAR | MAS | 1.1 km | MPC · JPL |
| 141971 | 2002 PM_{125} | — | August 14, 2002 | Socorro | LINEAR | · | 1.7 km | MPC · JPL |
| 141972 | 2002 PO_{125} | — | August 14, 2002 | Socorro | LINEAR | V | 1.4 km | MPC · JPL |
| 141973 | 2002 PR_{125} | — | August 14, 2002 | Socorro | LINEAR | · | 2.4 km | MPC · JPL |
| 141974 | 2002 PO_{126} | — | August 14, 2002 | Socorro | LINEAR | · | 2.4 km | MPC · JPL |
| 141975 | 2002 PS_{126} | — | August 14, 2002 | Socorro | LINEAR | NYS | 1.8 km | MPC · JPL |
| 141976 | 2002 PE_{127} | — | August 14, 2002 | Socorro | LINEAR | (5) | 2.5 km | MPC · JPL |
| 141977 | 2002 PZ_{127} | — | August 14, 2002 | Socorro | LINEAR | V | 1.1 km | MPC · JPL |
| 141978 | 2002 PZ_{128} | — | August 14, 2002 | Socorro | LINEAR | · | 4.9 km | MPC · JPL |
| 141979 | 2002 PU_{129} | — | August 15, 2002 | Anderson Mesa | LONEOS | (5) | 1.9 km | MPC · JPL |
| 141980 | 2002 PZ_{130} | — | August 6, 2002 | Palomar | NEAT | NYS | 2.0 km | MPC · JPL |
| 141981 | 2002 PT_{131} | — | August 15, 2002 | Socorro | LINEAR | · | 3.7 km | MPC · JPL |
| 141982 | 2002 PC_{132} | — | August 13, 2002 | Socorro | LINEAR | · | 2.0 km | MPC · JPL |
| 141983 | 2002 PJ_{132} | — | August 14, 2002 | Socorro | LINEAR | · | 2.2 km | MPC · JPL |
| 141984 | 2002 PK_{133} | — | August 14, 2002 | Socorro | LINEAR | · | 1.5 km | MPC · JPL |
| 141985 | 2002 PH_{134} | — | August 14, 2002 | Socorro | LINEAR | NYS | 2.1 km | MPC · JPL |
| 141986 | 2002 PX_{136} | — | August 15, 2002 | Anderson Mesa | LONEOS | · | 1.6 km | MPC · JPL |
| 141987 | 2002 PQ_{138} | — | August 11, 2002 | Socorro | LINEAR | · | 1.8 km | MPC · JPL |
| 141988 | 2002 PB_{139} | — | August 12, 2002 | Socorro | LINEAR | · | 2.2 km | MPC · JPL |
| 141989 | 2002 PC_{139} | — | August 12, 2002 | Socorro | LINEAR | · | 3.4 km | MPC · JPL |
| 141990 | 2002 PG_{139} | — | August 12, 2002 | Socorro | LINEAR | BRG | 2.9 km | MPC · JPL |
| 141991 | 2002 PO_{139} | — | August 12, 2002 | Haleakala | NEAT | · | 2.5 km | MPC · JPL |
| 141992 | 2002 PA_{140} | — | August 13, 2002 | Bergisch Gladbach | W. Bickel | NYS | 2.4 km | MPC · JPL |
| 141993 | 2002 PQ_{140} | — | August 15, 2002 | Bergisch Gladbach | W. Bickel | MAS | 1.1 km | MPC · JPL |
| 141994 | 2002 PP_{151} | — | August 8, 2002 | Palomar | NEAT | · | 1.8 km | MPC · JPL |
| 141995 Rossbeyer | 2002 PU_{154} | Rossbeyer | August 12, 2002 | Cerro Tololo | M. W. Buie | · | 1.5 km | MPC · JPL |
| 141996 | 2002 PG_{156} | — | August 8, 2002 | Palomar | S. F. Hönig | MAS | 950 m | MPC · JPL |
| 141997 | 2002 PK_{156} | — | August 8, 2002 | Palomar | S. F. Hönig | · | 1.6 km | MPC · JPL |
| 141998 | 2002 PE_{157} | — | August 8, 2002 | Palomar | S. F. Hönig | NYS | 2.2 km | MPC · JPL |
| 141999 | 2002 PJ_{157} | — | August 8, 2002 | Palomar | S. F. Hönig | V | 830 m | MPC · JPL |
| 142000 | 2002 PZ_{158} | — | August 8, 2002 | Palomar | S. F. Hönig | V | 920 m | MPC · JPL |

back to top

== See also ==
- Meanings of minor-planet names: 141001–142000
