= Stony Ridge =

Stony Ridge may refer to:

- 10168 Stony Ridge, a main-belt asteroid
- Stony Ridge, Ohio, a census-designated place in the United States
- Stony Ridge Observatory, an astronomical observatory in California
