= List of minor planets: 144001–145000 =

The following is a partial list of minor planets, running from minor-planet number 144001 through 145000, inclusive. The primary data for this and other partial lists is based on JPL's "Small-Body Orbital Elements" and data available from the Minor Planet Center. Critical list information is also provided by the MPC, unless otherwise specified from Lowell Observatory. A detailed description of the table's columns and additional sources are given on the main page including a complete list of every page in this series, and a statistical break-up on the dynamical classification of minor planets.

Also see the summary list of all named bodies in numerical and alphabetical order, and the corresponding naming citations for the number range of this particular list. New namings may only be added to this list after official publication, as the preannouncement of names is condemned by the Working Group for Small Bodies Nomenclature of the International Astronomical Union.

Near-Earth obj.	MBA (inner)	MBA (outer)	Centaur
Mars-crosser	MBA (middle)	Jupiter trojan	Trans-Neptunian obj.
Unclassified

== 144001–144100 ==
Designation			Discovery			Properties		Ref
Permanent	Provisional	Named after	Date	Site	Discoverer(s)	Category	Diam.	Ref
144001	2004 AC_{5}	—	January 13, 2004	Anderson Mesa	LONEOS	·	1.2 km	MPC · JPL
144002	2004 AY_{5}	—	January 13, 2004	Anderson Mesa	LONEOS	·	2.8 km	MPC · JPL
144003	2004 AS_{6}	—	January 15, 2004	Kitt Peak	Spacewatch	·	2.9 km	MPC · JPL
144004	2004 AH_{7}	—	January 13, 2004	Anderson Mesa	LONEOS	·	1.5 km	MPC · JPL
144005	2004 AB_{8}	—	January 13, 2004	Palomar	NEAT	·	1.7 km	MPC · JPL
144006	2004 AB_{9}	—	January 14, 2004	Palomar	NEAT	·	2.1 km	MPC · JPL
144007	2004 AP_{9}	—	January 14, 2004	Palomar	NEAT	·	5.5 km	MPC · JPL
144008	2004 AQ_{10}	—	January 15, 2004	Kitt Peak	Spacewatch	·	1.2 km	MPC · JPL
144009	2004 AX_{11}	—	January 13, 2004	Anderson Mesa	LONEOS	(5)	2.5 km	MPC · JPL
144010	2004 AG_{22}	—	January 15, 2004	Kitt Peak	Spacewatch	·	2.5 km	MPC · JPL
144011	2004 BT_{2}	—	January 16, 2004	Palomar	NEAT	NYS	1.4 km	MPC · JPL
144012	2004 BM_{3}	—	January 16, 2004	Palomar	NEAT	·	2.5 km	MPC · JPL
144013	2004 BH_{4}	—	January 16, 2004	Palomar	NEAT	·	2.3 km	MPC · JPL
144014	2004 BM_{4}	—	January 16, 2004	Palomar	NEAT	·	1.7 km	MPC · JPL
144015	2004 BG_{6}	—	January 16, 2004	Kitt Peak	Spacewatch	(17392)	2.2 km	MPC · JPL
144016	2004 BC_{8}	—	January 17, 2004	Kitt Peak	Spacewatch	·	1.8 km	MPC · JPL
144017	2004 BS_{9}	—	January 16, 2004	Palomar	NEAT	MAS	1.4 km	MPC · JPL
144018	2004 BW_{10}	—	January 17, 2004	Haleakala	NEAT	·	5.1 km	MPC · JPL
144019	2004 BK_{12}	—	January 17, 2004	Palomar	NEAT	·	1.6 km	MPC · JPL
144020	2004 BO_{12}	—	January 17, 2004	Palomar	NEAT	·	3.0 km	MPC · JPL
144021	2004 BX_{12}	—	January 17, 2004	Palomar	NEAT	·	1.4 km	MPC · JPL
144022	2004 BW_{13}	—	January 17, 2004	Palomar	NEAT	·	1.1 km	MPC · JPL
144023	2004 BZ_{13}	—	January 17, 2004	Palomar	NEAT	·	980 m	MPC · JPL
144024	2004 BA_{14}	—	January 17, 2004	Palomar	NEAT	·	2.0 km	MPC · JPL
144025	2004 BC_{15}	—	January 16, 2004	Kitt Peak	Spacewatch	·	1.9 km	MPC · JPL
144026	2004 BP_{15}	—	January 17, 2004	Kitt Peak	Spacewatch	NYS	2.2 km	MPC · JPL
144027	2004 BB_{19}	—	January 16, 2004	Palomar	NEAT	·	3.3 km	MPC · JPL
144028	2004 BF_{20}	—	January 19, 2004	Socorro	LINEAR	PHO	2.2 km	MPC · JPL
144029	2004 BM_{20}	—	January 16, 2004	Catalina	CSS	·	2.5 km	MPC · JPL
144030	2004 BP_{20}	—	January 16, 2004	Catalina	CSS	V	980 m	MPC · JPL
144031	2004 BA_{21}	—	January 16, 2004	Kitt Peak	Spacewatch	·	1.4 km	MPC · JPL
144032	2004 BN_{22}	—	January 17, 2004	Palomar	NEAT	·	2.1 km	MPC · JPL
144033	2004 BO_{22}	—	January 17, 2004	Palomar	NEAT	V	1.2 km	MPC · JPL
144034	2004 BM_{23}	—	January 18, 2004	Palomar	NEAT	·	2.6 km	MPC · JPL
144035	2004 BA_{24}	—	January 19, 2004	Anderson Mesa	LONEOS	·	1.9 km	MPC · JPL
144036	2004 BE_{24}	—	January 19, 2004	Anderson Mesa	LONEOS	·	1.8 km	MPC · JPL
144037	2004 BL_{24}	—	January 19, 2004	Anderson Mesa	LONEOS	·	1.2 km	MPC · JPL
144038	2004 BT_{24}	—	January 19, 2004	Kitt Peak	Spacewatch	MAS	1.1 km	MPC · JPL
144039	2004 BL_{25}	—	January 19, 2004	Catalina	CSS	NYS · fast	2.0 km	MPC · JPL
144040	2004 BV_{25}	—	January 19, 2004	Kitt Peak	Spacewatch	(29841)	2.2 km	MPC · JPL
144041	2004 BG_{26}	—	January 21, 2004	Socorro	LINEAR	·	1.9 km	MPC · JPL
144042	2004 BM_{26}	—	January 21, 2004	Socorro	LINEAR	·	920 m	MPC · JPL
144043	2004 BT_{26}	—	January 16, 2004	Kitt Peak	Spacewatch	·	1.2 km	MPC · JPL
144044	2004 BD_{27}	—	January 21, 2004	Socorro	LINEAR	·	2.2 km	MPC · JPL
144045	2004 BK_{27}	—	January 19, 2004	Socorro	LINEAR	·	2.3 km	MPC · JPL
144046	2004 BC_{28}	—	January 18, 2004	Palomar	NEAT	MAS	1.5 km	MPC · JPL
144047	2004 BD_{28}	—	January 18, 2004	Palomar	NEAT	NYS	2.3 km	MPC · JPL
144048	2004 BW_{29}	—	January 18, 2004	Palomar	NEAT	·	4.3 km	MPC · JPL
144049	2004 BY_{29}	—	January 18, 2004	Palomar	NEAT	·	3.0 km	MPC · JPL
144050	2004 BD_{30}	—	January 18, 2004	Palomar	NEAT	NYS	1.8 km	MPC · JPL
144051	2004 BF_{30}	—	January 18, 2004	Palomar	NEAT	·	2.2 km	MPC · JPL
144052	2004 BO_{30}	—	January 18, 2004	Palomar	NEAT	NYS	2.3 km	MPC · JPL
144053	2004 BZ_{30}	—	January 18, 2004	Palomar	NEAT	·	4.0 km	MPC · JPL
144054	2004 BM_{34}	—	January 19, 2004	Catalina	CSS	·	2.3 km	MPC · JPL
144055	2004 BR_{34}	—	January 19, 2004	Kitt Peak	Spacewatch	NYS	1.5 km	MPC · JPL
144056	2004 BH_{35}	—	January 19, 2004	Kitt Peak	Spacewatch	NYS	1.6 km	MPC · JPL
144057	2004 BJ_{36}	—	January 19, 2004	Kitt Peak	Spacewatch	NYS	2.1 km	MPC · JPL
144058	2004 BV_{37}	—	January 19, 2004	Catalina	CSS	·	3.2 km	MPC · JPL
144059	2004 BL_{40}	—	January 21, 2004	Socorro	LINEAR	·	1.4 km	MPC · JPL
144060	2004 BR_{41}	—	January 19, 2004	Socorro	LINEAR	slow	4.9 km	MPC · JPL
144061	2004 BB_{42}	—	January 19, 2004	Catalina	CSS	·	1.9 km	MPC · JPL
144062	2004 BF_{42}	—	January 19, 2004	Catalina	CSS	·	1.2 km	MPC · JPL
144063	2004 BU_{42}	—	January 19, 2004	Catalina	CSS	NYS	1.7 km	MPC · JPL
144064	2004 BE_{43}	—	January 22, 2004	Socorro	LINEAR	NYS	1.5 km	MPC · JPL
144065	2004 BS_{43}	—	January 22, 2004	Socorro	LINEAR	·	1.3 km	MPC · JPL
144066	2004 BD_{44}	—	January 22, 2004	Socorro	LINEAR	NYS	2.4 km	MPC · JPL
144067	2004 BP_{44}	—	January 22, 2004	Palomar	NEAT	·	2.5 km	MPC · JPL
144068	2004 BO_{45}	—	January 21, 2004	Socorro	LINEAR	·	3.5 km	MPC · JPL
144069	2004 BQ_{45}	—	January 21, 2004	Socorro	LINEAR	·	2.5 km	MPC · JPL
144070	2004 BV_{46}	—	January 21, 2004	Socorro	LINEAR	V	1.2 km	MPC · JPL
144071	2004 BY_{46}	—	January 21, 2004	Socorro	LINEAR	·	3.3 km	MPC · JPL
144072	2004 BE_{47}	—	January 21, 2004	Socorro	LINEAR	·	2.9 km	MPC · JPL
144073	2004 BB_{48}	—	January 21, 2004	Socorro	LINEAR	·	1.2 km	MPC · JPL
144074	2004 BQ_{48}	—	January 21, 2004	Socorro	LINEAR	·	1.6 km	MPC · JPL
144075	2004 BS_{48}	—	January 21, 2004	Socorro	LINEAR	·	2.1 km	MPC · JPL
144076	2004 BY_{48}	—	January 21, 2004	Socorro	LINEAR	·	1.2 km	MPC · JPL
144077	2004 BJ_{49}	—	January 21, 2004	Socorro	LINEAR	·	1.9 km	MPC · JPL
144078	2004 BM_{49}	—	January 21, 2004	Socorro	LINEAR	·	1.7 km	MPC · JPL
144079	2004 BH_{50}	—	January 21, 2004	Socorro	LINEAR	MAR	2.1 km	MPC · JPL
144080	2004 BL_{50}	—	January 21, 2004	Socorro	LINEAR	·	1.6 km	MPC · JPL
144081	2004 BR_{50}	—	January 21, 2004	Socorro	LINEAR	NYS	2.3 km	MPC · JPL
144082	2004 BP_{51}	—	January 21, 2004	Socorro	LINEAR	·	3.5 km	MPC · JPL
144083	2004 BR_{51}	—	January 21, 2004	Socorro	LINEAR	·	1.4 km	MPC · JPL
144084	2004 BX_{51}	—	January 21, 2004	Socorro	LINEAR	NYS	1.4 km	MPC · JPL
144085	2004 BO_{52}	—	January 21, 2004	Socorro	LINEAR	·	1.5 km	MPC · JPL
144086	2004 BF_{54}	—	January 22, 2004	Socorro	LINEAR	·	1.5 km	MPC · JPL
144087	2004 BR_{54}	—	January 22, 2004	Socorro	LINEAR	·	1.9 km	MPC · JPL
144088	2004 BV_{54}	—	January 22, 2004	Socorro	LINEAR	·	1.5 km	MPC · JPL
144089	2004 BV_{55}	—	January 22, 2004	Socorro	LINEAR	GEF	2.5 km	MPC · JPL
144090	2004 BN_{56}	—	January 23, 2004	Anderson Mesa	LONEOS	·	2.5 km	MPC · JPL
144091	2004 BP_{56}	—	January 23, 2004	Anderson Mesa	LONEOS	VER	3.7 km	MPC · JPL
144092	2004 BX_{56}	—	January 23, 2004	Socorro	LINEAR	·	1.8 km	MPC · JPL
144093	2004 BZ_{56}	—	January 23, 2004	Socorro	LINEAR	MAS	1.1 km	MPC · JPL
144094	2004 BC_{58}	—	January 23, 2004	Socorro	LINEAR	·	2.4 km	MPC · JPL
144095	2004 BO_{58}	—	January 23, 2004	Socorro	LINEAR	·	1.9 km	MPC · JPL
144096 Wiesendangen	2004 BV_{58}	Wiesendangen	January 23, 2004	Winterthur	M. Griesser	·	1.2 km	MPC · JPL
144097	2004 BB_{59}	—	January 23, 2004	Anderson Mesa	LONEOS	·	3.3 km	MPC · JPL
144098	2004 BE_{59}	—	January 23, 2004	Socorro	LINEAR	·	3.4 km	MPC · JPL
144099	2004 BO_{61}	—	January 22, 2004	Palomar	NEAT	·	2.8 km	MPC · JPL
144100	2004 BN_{62}	—	January 22, 2004	Socorro	LINEAR	PHO	1.9 km	MPC · JPL

== 144101–144200 ==
back to top

Designation			Discovery			Properties		Ref
Permanent	Provisional	Named after	Date	Site	Discoverer(s)	Category	Diam.	Ref
144101	2004 BX_{65}	—	January 22, 2004	Socorro	LINEAR	MIS	3.7 km	MPC · JPL
144102	2004 BH_{66}	—	January 22, 2004	Socorro	LINEAR	V	1 km	MPC · JPL
144103	2004 BS_{68}	—	January 27, 2004	Socorro	LINEAR	PHO	2.0 km	MPC · JPL
144104	2004 BN_{69}	—	January 27, 2004	Goodricke-Pigott	R. A. Tucker	·	3.6 km	MPC · JPL
144105	2004 BV_{69}	—	January 20, 2004	Socorro	LINEAR	·	1.3 km	MPC · JPL
144106	2004 BW_{70}	—	January 22, 2004	Socorro	LINEAR	TIR	3.8 km	MPC · JPL
144107	2004 BZ_{70}	—	January 22, 2004	Socorro	LINEAR	NYS	2.1 km	MPC · JPL
144108	2004 BV_{71}	—	January 23, 2004	Socorro	LINEAR	PAD	2.5 km	MPC · JPL
144109	2004 BA_{72}	—	January 23, 2004	Socorro	LINEAR	V	1.2 km	MPC · JPL
144110	2004 BN_{72}	—	January 23, 2004	Socorro	LINEAR	V	1.8 km	MPC · JPL
144111	2004 BO_{72}	—	January 23, 2004	Socorro	LINEAR	V	1.3 km	MPC · JPL
144112	2004 BM_{75}	—	January 23, 2004	Anderson Mesa	LONEOS	·	2.0 km	MPC · JPL
144113	2004 BN_{75}	—	January 23, 2004	Anderson Mesa	LONEOS	·	2.4 km	MPC · JPL
144114	2004 BW_{75}	—	January 23, 2004	Socorro	LINEAR	·	2.0 km	MPC · JPL
144115	2004 BR_{76}	—	January 25, 2004	Haleakala	NEAT	·	2.3 km	MPC · JPL
144116	2004 BB_{77}	—	January 21, 2004	Socorro	LINEAR	·	2.3 km	MPC · JPL
144117	2004 BU_{79}	—	January 23, 2004	Socorro	LINEAR	V · slow	1.2 km	MPC · JPL
144118	2004 BP_{81}	—	January 26, 2004	Anderson Mesa	LONEOS	·	2.2 km	MPC · JPL
144119	2004 BC_{82}	—	January 27, 2004	Kitt Peak	Spacewatch	HOF	3.3 km	MPC · JPL
144120	2004 BE_{82}	—	January 27, 2004	Anderson Mesa	LONEOS	·	1.5 km	MPC · JPL
144121	2004 BK_{82}	—	January 27, 2004	Anderson Mesa	LONEOS	·	3.1 km	MPC · JPL
144122	2004 BX_{82}	—	January 23, 2004	Anderson Mesa	LONEOS	·	2.7 km	MPC · JPL
144123	2004 BC_{84}	—	January 24, 2004	Socorro	LINEAR	·	2.3 km	MPC · JPL
144124	2004 BR_{86}	—	January 28, 2004	Catalina	CSS	·	2.9 km	MPC · JPL
144125	2004 BS_{86}	—	January 22, 2004	Socorro	LINEAR	·	1.1 km	MPC · JPL
144126	2004 BJ_{88}	—	January 23, 2004	Socorro	LINEAR	·	3.7 km	MPC · JPL
144127	2004 BM_{88}	—	January 23, 2004	Socorro	LINEAR	·	3.2 km	MPC · JPL
144128	2004 BW_{88}	—	January 23, 2004	Socorro	LINEAR	·	2.3 km	MPC · JPL
144129	2004 BA_{89}	—	January 23, 2004	Socorro	LINEAR	·	2.3 km	MPC · JPL
144130	2004 BM_{89}	—	January 23, 2004	Socorro	LINEAR	·	1.8 km	MPC · JPL
144131	2004 BN_{89}	—	January 23, 2004	Socorro	LINEAR	·	3.6 km	MPC · JPL
144132	2004 BO_{89}	—	January 23, 2004	Socorro	LINEAR	·	1.9 km	MPC · JPL
144133	2004 BT_{89}	—	January 23, 2004	Socorro	LINEAR	·	3.6 km	MPC · JPL
144134	2004 BZ_{89}	—	January 23, 2004	Socorro	LINEAR	(2076)	1.1 km	MPC · JPL
144135	2004 BE_{90}	—	January 23, 2004	Socorro	LINEAR	·	1.7 km	MPC · JPL
144136	2004 BN_{90}	—	January 24, 2004	Socorro	LINEAR	·	2.0 km	MPC · JPL
144137	2004 BW_{90}	—	January 24, 2004	Socorro	LINEAR	·	3.7 km	MPC · JPL
144138	2004 BB_{91}	—	January 24, 2004	Socorro	LINEAR	·	3.5 km	MPC · JPL
144139	2004 BC_{91}	—	January 24, 2004	Socorro	LINEAR	·	1.4 km	MPC · JPL
144140	2004 BH_{92}	—	January 26, 2004	Anderson Mesa	LONEOS	·	2.2 km	MPC · JPL
144141	2004 BS_{92}	—	January 27, 2004	Anderson Mesa	LONEOS	RAF	1.6 km	MPC · JPL
144142	2004 BU_{92}	—	January 27, 2004	Anderson Mesa	LONEOS	·	2.2 km	MPC · JPL
144143	2004 BG_{93}	—	January 27, 2004	Anderson Mesa	LONEOS	·	3.5 km	MPC · JPL
144144	2004 BK_{93}	—	January 27, 2004	Catalina	CSS	·	2.8 km	MPC · JPL
144145	2004 BT_{93}	—	January 28, 2004	Socorro	LINEAR	·	3.0 km	MPC · JPL
144146	2004 BW_{93}	—	January 28, 2004	Socorro	LINEAR	·	1.4 km	MPC · JPL
144147	2004 BE_{94}	—	January 28, 2004	Haleakala	NEAT	·	5.9 km	MPC · JPL
144148	2004 BX_{94}	—	January 28, 2004	Socorro	LINEAR	·	3.2 km	MPC · JPL
144149	2004 BK_{95}	—	January 28, 2004	Socorro	LINEAR	·	3.6 km	MPC · JPL
144150	2004 BS_{95}	—	January 16, 2004	Palomar	NEAT	·	2.2 km	MPC · JPL
144151	2004 BP_{96}	—	January 24, 2004	Socorro	LINEAR	·	1.1 km	MPC · JPL
144152	2004 BY_{96}	—	January 24, 2004	Socorro	LINEAR	·	2.1 km	MPC · JPL
144153	2004 BL_{97}	—	January 26, 2004	Anderson Mesa	LONEOS	·	2.2 km	MPC · JPL
144154	2004 BN_{98}	—	January 27, 2004	Kitt Peak	Spacewatch	·	2.7 km	MPC · JPL
144155	2004 BP_{98}	—	January 27, 2004	Kitt Peak	Spacewatch	EMA	4.8 km	MPC · JPL
144156	2004 BE_{99}	—	January 27, 2004	Kitt Peak	Spacewatch	·	4.6 km	MPC · JPL
144157	2004 BQ_{99}	—	January 27, 2004	Kitt Peak	Spacewatch	NYS	1.5 km	MPC · JPL
144158	2004 BR_{99}	—	January 27, 2004	Kitt Peak	Spacewatch	·	4.9 km	MPC · JPL
144159	2004 BH_{100}	—	January 28, 2004	Socorro	LINEAR	KOR	2.0 km	MPC · JPL
144160	2004 BU_{100}	—	January 28, 2004	Kitt Peak	Spacewatch	·	2.4 km	MPC · JPL
144161	2004 BP_{101}	—	January 28, 2004	Socorro	LINEAR	·	4.7 km	MPC · JPL
144162	2004 BA_{102}	—	January 29, 2004	Socorro	LINEAR	·	2.3 km	MPC · JPL
144163	2004 BV_{103}	—	January 23, 2004	Socorro	LINEAR	NYS	2.1 km	MPC · JPL
144164	2004 BY_{103}	—	January 23, 2004	Socorro	LINEAR	·	2.7 km	MPC · JPL
144165	2004 BZ_{105}	—	January 26, 2004	Anderson Mesa	LONEOS	·	3.0 km	MPC · JPL
144166	2004 BE_{106}	—	January 26, 2004	Anderson Mesa	LONEOS	·	2.3 km	MPC · JPL
144167	2004 BQ_{106}	—	January 26, 2004	Anderson Mesa	LONEOS	·	4.9 km	MPC · JPL
144168	2004 BF_{107}	—	January 28, 2004	Catalina	CSS	·	3.2 km	MPC · JPL
144169	2004 BX_{107}	—	January 28, 2004	Catalina	CSS	·	2.3 km	MPC · JPL
144170	2004 BK_{108}	—	January 28, 2004	Catalina	CSS	·	2.0 km	MPC · JPL
144171	2004 BR_{108}	—	January 28, 2004	Catalina	CSS	·	1.2 km	MPC · JPL
144172	2004 BK_{110}	—	January 28, 2004	Catalina	CSS	PHO	1.9 km	MPC · JPL
144173	2004 BK_{111}	—	January 29, 2004	Catalina	CSS	·	3.4 km	MPC · JPL
144174	2004 BW_{111}	—	January 23, 2004	Socorro	LINEAR	·	1.8 km	MPC · JPL
144175	2004 BZ_{111}	—	January 24, 2004	Socorro	LINEAR	·	4.1 km	MPC · JPL
144176	2004 BN_{113}	—	January 28, 2004	Socorro	LINEAR	·	4.6 km	MPC · JPL
144177	2004 BV_{113}	—	January 28, 2004	Socorro	LINEAR	·	3.1 km	MPC · JPL
144178	2004 BD_{114}	—	January 29, 2004	Socorro	LINEAR	NYS	1.9 km	MPC · JPL
144179	2004 BO_{114}	—	January 29, 2004	Anderson Mesa	LONEOS	ERI	2.4 km	MPC · JPL
144180	2004 BP_{114}	—	January 29, 2004	Anderson Mesa	LONEOS	·	5.6 km	MPC · JPL
144181	2004 BT_{115}	—	January 30, 2004	Catalina	CSS	·	2.8 km	MPC · JPL
144182	2004 BX_{115}	—	January 26, 2004	Anderson Mesa	LONEOS	·	1.9 km	MPC · JPL
144183	2004 BC_{116}	—	January 26, 2004	Anderson Mesa	LONEOS	·	1.7 km	MPC · JPL
144184	2004 BZ_{116}	—	January 28, 2004	Catalina	CSS	V	1.2 km	MPC · JPL
144185	2004 BC_{117}	—	January 28, 2004	Catalina	CSS	·	3.8 km	MPC · JPL
144186	2004 BQ_{119}	—	January 30, 2004	Catalina	CSS	·	2.6 km	MPC · JPL
144187	2004 BU_{119}	—	January 30, 2004	Catalina	CSS	(194)	3.4 km	MPC · JPL
144188	2004 BW_{119}	—	January 30, 2004	Anderson Mesa	LONEOS	·	2.4 km	MPC · JPL
144189	2004 BX_{119}	—	January 30, 2004	Socorro	LINEAR	·	2.0 km	MPC · JPL
144190	2004 BB_{120}	—	January 30, 2004	Catalina	CSS	·	2.6 km	MPC · JPL
144191	2004 BQ_{121}	—	January 17, 2004	Palomar	NEAT	(23255)	6.6 km	MPC · JPL
144192	2004 BT_{123}	—	January 22, 2004	Mauna Kea	Allen, L.	·	3.6 km	MPC · JPL
144193	2004 BY_{123}	—	January 16, 2004	Palomar	NEAT	·	3.1 km	MPC · JPL
144194	2004 BA_{124}	—	January 17, 2004	Palomar	NEAT	·	2.5 km	MPC · JPL
144195	2004 BV_{127}	—	January 16, 2004	Kitt Peak	Spacewatch	·	2.2 km	MPC · JPL
144196	2004 BX_{135}	—	January 19, 2004	Kitt Peak	Spacewatch	·	1.6 km	MPC · JPL
144197	2004 BZ_{139}	—	January 19, 2004	Kitt Peak	Spacewatch	MAS	900 m	MPC · JPL
144198	2004 BN_{147}	—	January 22, 2004	Socorro	LINEAR	·	1.7 km	MPC · JPL
144199	2004 BV_{161}	—	January 30, 2004	Kitt Peak	Spacewatch	·	1.8 km	MPC · JPL
144200	2004 CH	—	February 2, 2004	Socorro	LINEAR	·	5.2 km	MPC · JPL

== 144201–144300 ==
back to top

Designation			Discovery			Properties		Ref
Permanent	Provisional	Named after	Date	Site	Discoverer(s)	Category	Diam.	Ref
144201	2004 CO_{1}	—	February 11, 2004	Desert Eagle	W. K. Y. Yeung	·	2.7 km	MPC · JPL
144202	2004 CR_{1}	—	February 11, 2004	Desert Eagle	W. K. Y. Yeung	·	2.6 km	MPC · JPL
144203	2004 CD_{7}	—	February 10, 2004	Palomar	NEAT	·	2.2 km	MPC · JPL
144204	2004 CF_{7}	—	February 10, 2004	Palomar	NEAT	·	3.2 km	MPC · JPL
144205	2004 CS_{7}	—	February 10, 2004	Catalina	CSS	·	1.9 km	MPC · JPL
144206	2004 CB_{9}	—	February 11, 2004	Kitt Peak	Spacewatch	NYS	1.7 km	MPC · JPL
144207	2004 CT_{9}	—	February 11, 2004	Kitt Peak	Spacewatch	·	3.2 km	MPC · JPL
144208	2004 CS_{10}	—	February 11, 2004	Palomar	NEAT	·	6.7 km	MPC · JPL
144209	2004 CB_{12}	—	February 11, 2004	Palomar	NEAT	·	3.6 km	MPC · JPL
144210	2004 CH_{12}	—	February 11, 2004	Catalina	CSS	·	2.3 km	MPC · JPL
144211	2004 CM_{12}	—	February 11, 2004	Catalina	CSS	MAS	1.2 km	MPC · JPL
144212	2004 CS_{13}	—	February 11, 2004	Palomar	NEAT	·	2.9 km	MPC · JPL
144213	2004 CD_{14}	—	February 11, 2004	Anderson Mesa	LONEOS	THM	4.3 km	MPC · JPL
144214	2004 CE_{15}	—	February 11, 2004	Palomar	NEAT	·	1.7 km	MPC · JPL
144215	2004 CJ_{15}	—	February 11, 2004	Kitt Peak	Spacewatch	·	2.3 km	MPC · JPL
144216	2004 CW_{16}	—	February 11, 2004	Kitt Peak	Spacewatch	·	2.2 km	MPC · JPL
144217	2004 CD_{18}	—	February 10, 2004	Palomar	NEAT	·	3.4 km	MPC · JPL
144218	2004 CF_{18}	—	February 10, 2004	Palomar	NEAT	·	2.6 km	MPC · JPL
144219	2004 CS_{22}	—	February 12, 2004	Kitt Peak	Spacewatch	·	930 m	MPC · JPL
144220	2004 CX_{22}	—	February 12, 2004	Kitt Peak	Spacewatch	·	2.2 km	MPC · JPL
144221	2004 CS_{26}	—	February 11, 2004	Catalina	CSS	·	1.6 km	MPC · JPL
144222	2004 CA_{27}	—	February 11, 2004	Palomar	NEAT	·	1.7 km	MPC · JPL
144223	2004 CH_{33}	—	February 12, 2004	Kitt Peak	Spacewatch	·	3.2 km	MPC · JPL
144224	2004 CQ_{35}	—	February 11, 2004	Catalina	CSS	EUN	1.7 km	MPC · JPL
144225	2004 CL_{37}	—	February 12, 2004	Desert Eagle	W. K. Y. Yeung	NYS	2.2 km	MPC · JPL
144226	2004 CZ_{37}	—	February 13, 2004	Palomar	NEAT	·	2.1 km	MPC · JPL
144227	2004 CU_{41}	—	February 14, 2004	Haleakala	NEAT	·	3.6 km	MPC · JPL
144228	2004 CN_{43}	—	February 12, 2004	Kitt Peak	Spacewatch	·	2.6 km	MPC · JPL
144229	2004 CU_{49}	—	February 11, 2004	Kitt Peak	Spacewatch	·	1.3 km	MPC · JPL
144230	2004 CA_{51}	—	February 15, 2004	Haleakala	NEAT	·	2.0 km	MPC · JPL
144231	2004 CV_{52}	—	February 10, 2004	Catalina	CSS	NYS	2.7 km	MPC · JPL
144232	2004 CN_{54}	—	February 11, 2004	Anderson Mesa	LONEOS	·	2.3 km	MPC · JPL
144233	2004 CO_{54}	—	February 11, 2004	Anderson Mesa	LONEOS	·	1.8 km	MPC · JPL
144234	2004 CO_{55}	—	February 12, 2004	Palomar	NEAT	·	1.9 km	MPC · JPL
144235	2004 CP_{58}	—	February 10, 2004	Palomar	NEAT	·	2.2 km	MPC · JPL
144236	2004 CU_{65}	—	February 15, 2004	Socorro	LINEAR	·	2.0 km	MPC · JPL
144237	2004 CA_{73}	—	February 13, 2004	Kitt Peak	Spacewatch	·	1.9 km	MPC · JPL
144238	2004 CJ_{73}	—	February 14, 2004	Palomar	NEAT	·	2.8 km	MPC · JPL
144239	2004 CS_{73}	—	February 15, 2004	Socorro	LINEAR	·	1.1 km	MPC · JPL
144240	2004 CC_{74}	—	February 10, 2004	Palomar	NEAT	·	1.8 km	MPC · JPL
144241	2004 CD_{74}	—	February 10, 2004	Palomar	NEAT	MAS	1.4 km	MPC · JPL
144242	2004 CE_{74}	—	February 10, 2004	Palomar	NEAT	·	4.7 km	MPC · JPL
144243	2004 CA_{76}	—	February 11, 2004	Kitt Peak	Spacewatch	·	1.4 km	MPC · JPL
144244	2004 CW_{76}	—	February 11, 2004	Palomar	NEAT	·	2.7 km	MPC · JPL
144245	2004 CU_{78}	—	February 11, 2004	Palomar	NEAT	·	3.2 km	MPC · JPL
144246	2004 CZ_{78}	—	February 11, 2004	Palomar	NEAT	·	2.2 km	MPC · JPL
144247	2004 CG_{79}	—	February 11, 2004	Palomar	NEAT	KOR	2.3 km	MPC · JPL
144248	2004 CE_{80}	—	February 11, 2004	Palomar	NEAT	·	3.1 km	MPC · JPL
144249	2004 CV_{82}	—	February 12, 2004	Kitt Peak	Spacewatch	·	1.9 km	MPC · JPL
144250	2004 CQ_{83}	—	February 12, 2004	Kitt Peak	Spacewatch	·	3.7 km	MPC · JPL
144251	2004 CU_{83}	—	February 12, 2004	Kitt Peak	Spacewatch	HOF	3.7 km	MPC · JPL
144252	2004 CC_{84}	—	February 12, 2004	Kitt Peak	Spacewatch	·	5.4 km	MPC · JPL
144253	2004 CV_{84}	—	February 13, 2004	Kitt Peak	Spacewatch	·	1.7 km	MPC · JPL
144254	2004 CD_{86}	—	February 14, 2004	Kitt Peak	Spacewatch	·	3.4 km	MPC · JPL
144255	2004 CF_{87}	—	February 11, 2004	Palomar	NEAT	·	1.7 km	MPC · JPL
144256	2004 CL_{87}	—	February 11, 2004	Catalina	CSS	·	1.8 km	MPC · JPL
144257	2004 CH_{89}	—	February 11, 2004	Kitt Peak	Spacewatch	PHO	1.6 km	MPC · JPL
144258	2004 CN_{90}	—	February 12, 2004	Palomar	NEAT	·	3.2 km	MPC · JPL
144259	2004 CY_{92}	—	February 15, 2004	Socorro	LINEAR	·	1.9 km	MPC · JPL
144260	2004 CK_{93}	—	February 15, 2004	Socorro	LINEAR	·	4.8 km	MPC · JPL
144261	2004 CX_{93}	—	February 11, 2004	Catalina	CSS	·	2.3 km	MPC · JPL
144262	2004 CY_{93}	—	February 11, 2004	Palomar	NEAT	·	2.1 km	MPC · JPL
144263	2004 CR_{94}	—	February 12, 2004	Palomar	NEAT	·	3.2 km	MPC · JPL
144264	2004 CF_{95}	—	February 13, 2004	Palomar	NEAT	AGN	2.1 km	MPC · JPL
144265	2004 CH_{95}	—	February 13, 2004	Palomar	NEAT	MAR	3.6 km	MPC · JPL
144266	2004 CZ_{95}	—	February 14, 2004	Kitt Peak	Spacewatch	·	2.1 km	MPC · JPL
144267	2004 CE_{96}	—	February 14, 2004	Kitt Peak	Spacewatch	·	7.0 km	MPC · JPL
144268	2004 CG_{96}	—	February 14, 2004	Kitt Peak	Spacewatch	·	4.0 km	MPC · JPL
144269	2004 CJ_{96}	—	February 14, 2004	Kitt Peak	Spacewatch	NYS	1.7 km	MPC · JPL
144270	2004 CM_{96}	—	February 15, 2004	Socorro	LINEAR	·	2.3 km	MPC · JPL
144271	2004 CY_{96}	—	February 12, 2004	Palomar	NEAT	·	5.1 km	MPC · JPL
144272	2004 CA_{97}	—	February 13, 2004	Palomar	NEAT	·	2.7 km	MPC · JPL
144273	2004 CG_{97}	—	February 13, 2004	Palomar	NEAT	·	9.4 km	MPC · JPL
144274	2004 CQ_{97}	—	February 14, 2004	Socorro	LINEAR	·	3.0 km	MPC · JPL
144275	2004 CY_{98}	—	February 14, 2004	Catalina	CSS	HYG	4.6 km	MPC · JPL
144276	2004 CN_{99}	—	February 15, 2004	Catalina	CSS	·	2.0 km	MPC · JPL
144277	2004 CO_{100}	—	February 15, 2004	Catalina	CSS	·	1.9 km	MPC · JPL
144278	2004 CU_{100}	—	February 15, 2004	Catalina	CSS	NYS	1.6 km	MPC · JPL
144279	2004 CG_{101}	—	February 15, 2004	Catalina	CSS	·	3.6 km	MPC · JPL
144280	2004 CH_{101}	—	February 15, 2004	Catalina	CSS	EUN	1.6 km	MPC · JPL
144281	2004 CW_{103}	—	February 12, 2004	Palomar	NEAT	·	4.1 km	MPC · JPL
144282	2004 CO_{104}	—	February 13, 2004	Palomar	NEAT	·	6.0 km	MPC · JPL
144283	2004 CY_{106}	—	February 14, 2004	Palomar	NEAT	·	4.2 km	MPC · JPL
144284	2004 CP_{107}	—	February 14, 2004	Kitt Peak	Spacewatch	MAS	1.2 km	MPC · JPL
144285	2004 CT_{108}	—	February 15, 2004	Catalina	CSS	·	3.0 km	MPC · JPL
144286	2004 CF_{109}	—	February 15, 2004	Catalina	CSS	·	3.6 km	MPC · JPL
144287	2004 CE_{110}	—	February 14, 2004	Palomar	NEAT	·	4.1 km	MPC · JPL
144288	2004 CY_{110}	—	February 13, 2004	Kitt Peak	Spacewatch	MAS	1.2 km	MPC · JPL
144289	2004 CD_{113}	—	February 13, 2004	Anderson Mesa	LONEOS	(5)	2.2 km	MPC · JPL
144290	2004 CO_{116}	—	February 11, 2004	Palomar	NEAT	·	2.0 km	MPC · JPL
144291	2004 CS_{116}	—	February 11, 2004	Palomar	NEAT	·	3.5 km	MPC · JPL
144292	2004 CX_{116}	—	February 11, 2004	Kitt Peak	Spacewatch	·	1.6 km	MPC · JPL
144293	2004 CH_{121}	—	February 12, 2004	Palomar	NEAT	·	2.8 km	MPC · JPL
144294	2004 CQ_{121}	—	February 12, 2004	Kitt Peak	Spacewatch	·	2.1 km	MPC · JPL
144295	2004 CK_{128}	—	February 14, 2004	Kitt Peak	Spacewatch	·	1.5 km	MPC · JPL
144296 Steviewonder	2004 DF	Steviewonder	February 16, 2004	Desert Eagle	W. K. Y. Yeung	·	2.5 km	MPC · JPL
144297	2004 DS	—	February 16, 2004	Kitt Peak	Spacewatch	·	1.2 km	MPC · JPL
144298	2004 DY	—	February 16, 2004	Socorro	LINEAR	·	3.7 km	MPC · JPL
144299	2004 DA_{3}	—	February 16, 2004	Kitt Peak	Spacewatch	MAR	1.7 km	MPC · JPL
144300	2004 DC_{3}	—	February 16, 2004	Kitt Peak	Spacewatch	·	2.1 km	MPC · JPL

== 144301–144400 ==
back to top

Designation			Discovery			Properties		Ref
Permanent	Provisional	Named after	Date	Site	Discoverer(s)	Category	Diam.	Ref
144301	2004 DK_{4}	—	February 16, 2004	Kvistaberg	Uppsala-DLR Asteroid Survey	ERI	3.3 km	MPC · JPL
144302	2004 DV_{4}	—	February 16, 2004	Kitt Peak	Spacewatch	·	2.2 km	MPC · JPL
144303 Mirellabreschi	2004 DD_{7}	Mirellabreschi	February 16, 2004	San Marcello	L. Tesi, Fagioli, G.	·	1.8 km	MPC · JPL
144304	2004 DS_{7}	—	February 17, 2004	Kitt Peak	Spacewatch	·	2.3 km	MPC · JPL
144305	2004 DT_{8}	—	February 17, 2004	Kitt Peak	Spacewatch	·	1.9 km	MPC · JPL
144306	2004 DC_{11}	—	February 16, 2004	Kitt Peak	Spacewatch	NYS	2.1 km	MPC · JPL
144307	2004 DL_{11}	—	February 16, 2004	Kitt Peak	Spacewatch	·	1.7 km	MPC · JPL
144308	2004 DV_{11}	—	February 17, 2004	Kitt Peak	Spacewatch	MAS	1.1 km	MPC · JPL
144309	2004 DR_{12}	—	February 16, 2004	Catalina	CSS	·	1.5 km	MPC · JPL
144310	2004 DZ_{12}	—	February 16, 2004	Catalina	CSS	RAF	1.6 km	MPC · JPL
144311	2004 DJ_{14}	—	February 16, 2004	Catalina	CSS	·	3.2 km	MPC · JPL
144312	2004 DO_{14}	—	February 16, 2004	Kitt Peak	Spacewatch	NYS	1.5 km	MPC · JPL
144313	2004 DW_{15}	—	February 17, 2004	Socorro	LINEAR	·	4.1 km	MPC · JPL
144314	2004 DF_{16}	—	February 17, 2004	Kitt Peak	Spacewatch	NYS	2.0 km	MPC · JPL
144315	2004 DM_{16}	—	February 17, 2004	Haleakala	NEAT	·	2.7 km	MPC · JPL
144316	2004 DX_{16}	—	February 18, 2004	Socorro	LINEAR	·	1.4 km	MPC · JPL
144317	2004 DT_{17}	—	February 18, 2004	Kitt Peak	Spacewatch	·	6.0 km	MPC · JPL
144318	2004 DL_{18}	—	February 18, 2004	Haleakala	NEAT	·	1.6 km	MPC · JPL
144319	2004 DR_{18}	—	February 18, 2004	Haleakala	NEAT	·	3.1 km	MPC · JPL
144320	2004 DS_{18}	—	February 18, 2004	Haleakala	NEAT	·	1.8 km	MPC · JPL
144321	2004 DJ_{19}	—	February 17, 2004	Socorro	LINEAR	·	2.3 km	MPC · JPL
144322	2004 DK_{20}	—	February 17, 2004	Catalina	CSS	·	2.0 km	MPC · JPL
144323	2004 DN_{20}	—	February 17, 2004	Catalina	CSS	·	2.6 km	MPC · JPL
144324	2004 DO_{20}	—	February 17, 2004	Socorro	LINEAR	NYS	2.4 km	MPC · JPL
144325	2004 DX_{20}	—	February 17, 2004	Socorro	LINEAR	·	1.9 km	MPC · JPL
144326	2004 DZ_{21}	—	February 17, 2004	Catalina	CSS	·	1.7 km	MPC · JPL
144327	2004 DD_{22}	—	February 17, 2004	Catalina	CSS	NYS	2.3 km	MPC · JPL
144328	2004 DU_{22}	—	February 18, 2004	Socorro	LINEAR	·	1.4 km	MPC · JPL
144329	2004 DD_{23}	—	February 18, 2004	Socorro	LINEAR	·	3.6 km	MPC · JPL
144330	2004 DE_{24}	—	February 19, 2004	Socorro	LINEAR	·	1.3 km	MPC · JPL
144331	2004 DR_{24}	—	February 19, 2004	Socorro	LINEAR	V	1.2 km	MPC · JPL
144332	2004 DV_{24}	—	February 21, 2004	Haleakala	NEAT	AMO · APO +1km · PHA	1.7 km	MPC · JPL
144333 Marcinkiewicz	2004 DT_{25}	Marcinkiewicz	February 20, 2004	Altschwendt	W. Ries	·	3.3 km	MPC · JPL
144334	2004 DM_{26}	—	February 16, 2004	Kitt Peak	Spacewatch	·	2.4 km	MPC · JPL
144335	2004 DS_{28}	—	February 17, 2004	Kitt Peak	Spacewatch	·	2.6 km	MPC · JPL
144336	2004 DE_{30}	—	February 17, 2004	Socorro	LINEAR	·	5.0 km	MPC · JPL
144337	2004 DG_{30}	—	February 17, 2004	Socorro	LINEAR	·	1.9 km	MPC · JPL
144338	2004 DO_{30}	—	February 17, 2004	Socorro	LINEAR	BRA	3.1 km	MPC · JPL
144339	2004 DY_{31}	—	February 17, 2004	Kitt Peak	Spacewatch	EOS	3.0 km	MPC · JPL
144340	2004 DG_{32}	—	February 18, 2004	Socorro	LINEAR	·	2.0 km	MPC · JPL
144341	2004 DS_{32}	—	February 18, 2004	Socorro	LINEAR	·	1.7 km	MPC · JPL
144342	2004 DW_{32}	—	February 18, 2004	Socorro	LINEAR	·	2.2 km	MPC · JPL
144343	2004 DM_{33}	—	February 18, 2004	Socorro	LINEAR	MAS	1.4 km	MPC · JPL
144344	2004 DQ_{33}	—	February 18, 2004	Socorro	LINEAR	·	2.0 km	MPC · JPL
144345	2004 DJ_{34}	—	February 18, 2004	Haleakala	NEAT	·	2.6 km	MPC · JPL
144346	2004 DH_{35}	—	February 19, 2004	Socorro	LINEAR	V	1.3 km	MPC · JPL
144347	2004 DO_{36}	—	February 19, 2004	Socorro	LINEAR	·	2.8 km	MPC · JPL
144348	2004 DR_{36}	—	February 19, 2004	Socorro	LINEAR	NYS	1.8 km	MPC · JPL
144349	2004 DU_{36}	—	February 19, 2004	Socorro	LINEAR	MAR	2.5 km	MPC · JPL
144350	2004 DV_{36}	—	February 19, 2004	Socorro	LINEAR	·	2.6 km	MPC · JPL
144351	2004 DY_{36}	—	February 19, 2004	Socorro	LINEAR	(5)	1.6 km	MPC · JPL
144352	2004 DY_{37}	—	February 19, 2004	Socorro	LINEAR	EOS	3.2 km	MPC · JPL
144353	2004 DY_{39}	—	February 16, 2004	Kitt Peak	Spacewatch	MAS	1.1 km	MPC · JPL
144354	2004 DB_{41}	—	February 18, 2004	Socorro	LINEAR	·	5.9 km	MPC · JPL
144355	2004 DH_{41}	—	February 18, 2004	Haleakala	NEAT	·	5.4 km	MPC · JPL
144356	2004 DJ_{41}	—	February 18, 2004	Haleakala	NEAT	·	5.8 km	MPC · JPL
144357	2004 DB_{42}	—	February 19, 2004	Socorro	LINEAR	·	1.8 km	MPC · JPL
144358	2004 DD_{42}	—	February 19, 2004	Socorro	LINEAR	·	1.7 km	MPC · JPL
144359	2004 DJ_{42}	—	February 19, 2004	Socorro	LINEAR	·	2.0 km	MPC · JPL
144360	2004 DF_{44}	—	February 17, 2004	Socorro	LINEAR	EUP	6.7 km	MPC · JPL
144361	2004 DV_{44}	—	February 19, 2004	Socorro	LINEAR	·	1.2 km	MPC · JPL
144362 Swantner	2004 DG_{45}	Swantner	February 26, 2004	Jornada	Dixon, D. S.	·	4.4 km	MPC · JPL
144363	2004 DX_{46}	—	February 19, 2004	Socorro	LINEAR	EOS	3.5 km	MPC · JPL
144364	2004 DE_{47}	—	February 19, 2004	Socorro	LINEAR	·	3.7 km	MPC · JPL
144365	2004 DN_{47}	—	February 19, 2004	Socorro	LINEAR	·	2.1 km	MPC · JPL
144366	2004 DA_{48}	—	February 19, 2004	Socorro	LINEAR	KOR	2.4 km	MPC · JPL
144367	2004 DG_{48}	—	February 19, 2004	Socorro	LINEAR	·	3.4 km	MPC · JPL
144368	2004 DK_{48}	—	February 19, 2004	Socorro	LINEAR	·	1.7 km	MPC · JPL
144369	2004 DW_{48}	—	February 19, 2004	Socorro	LINEAR	·	3.0 km	MPC · JPL
144370	2004 DH_{49}	—	February 19, 2004	Socorro	LINEAR	·	1.8 km	MPC · JPL
144371	2004 DJ_{49}	—	February 19, 2004	Socorro	LINEAR	PAD	2.8 km	MPC · JPL
144372	2004 DN_{51}	—	February 23, 2004	Socorro	LINEAR	·	1.8 km	MPC · JPL
144373	2004 DX_{52}	—	February 20, 2004	Haleakala	NEAT	·	2.4 km	MPC · JPL
144374	2004 DF_{55}	—	February 22, 2004	Kitt Peak	Spacewatch	·	1.4 km	MPC · JPL
144375	2004 DL_{56}	—	February 22, 2004	Kitt Peak	Spacewatch	BRA	2.1 km	MPC · JPL
144376	2004 DR_{59}	—	February 25, 2004	Socorro	LINEAR	·	3.3 km	MPC · JPL
144377	2004 DW_{59}	—	February 26, 2004	Desert Eagle	W. K. Y. Yeung	·	830 m	MPC · JPL
144378	2004 DK_{60}	—	February 26, 2004	Socorro	LINEAR	·	3.0 km	MPC · JPL
144379	2004 DW_{60}	—	February 26, 2004	Socorro	LINEAR	VER	3.8 km	MPC · JPL
144380	2004 DC_{61}	—	February 26, 2004	Socorro	LINEAR	·	1.6 km	MPC · JPL
144381	2004 DK_{61}	—	February 26, 2004	Socorro	LINEAR	EUN	2.0 km	MPC · JPL
144382	2004 DZ_{62}	—	February 29, 2004	Kitt Peak	Spacewatch	·	2.1 km	MPC · JPL
144383	2004 DK_{65}	—	February 22, 2004	Kitt Peak	M. W. Buie	·	1.6 km	MPC · JPL
144384	2004 DZ_{65}	—	February 23, 2004	Socorro	LINEAR	·	3.0 km	MPC · JPL
144385	2004 DJ_{69}	—	February 26, 2004	Kitt Peak	M. W. Buie	·	4.7 km	MPC · JPL
144386 Emmabirath	2004 DB_{71}	Emmabirath	February 27, 2004	Kitt Peak	M. W. Buie	·	820 m	MPC · JPL
144387	2004 DT_{71}	—	February 16, 2004	Socorro	LINEAR	·	2.5 km	MPC · JPL
144388	2004 DD_{72}	—	February 16, 2004	Kitt Peak	Spacewatch	·	4.0 km	MPC · JPL
144389	2004 DT_{72}	—	February 16, 2004	Kitt Peak	Spacewatch	·	2.3 km	MPC · JPL
144390	2004 DK_{75}	—	February 17, 2004	Kitt Peak	Spacewatch	·	1.5 km	MPC · JPL
144391	2004 EK	—	March 11, 2004	Needville	J. Dellinger	KOR	2.2 km	MPC · JPL
144392	2004 EO_{1}	—	March 10, 2004	Palomar	NEAT	·	3.2 km	MPC · JPL
144393	2004 EW_{1}	—	March 11, 2004	Palomar	NEAT	·	2.0 km	MPC · JPL
144394	2004 EO_{2}	—	March 13, 2004	Palomar	NEAT	·	2.8 km	MPC · JPL
144395	2004 ER_{2}	—	March 13, 2004	Palomar	NEAT	·	2.6 km	MPC · JPL
144396	2004 EG_{3}	—	March 10, 2004	Palomar	NEAT	·	4.2 km	MPC · JPL
144397	2004 EP_{3}	—	March 10, 2004	Palomar	NEAT	·	3.0 km	MPC · JPL
144398	2004 EY_{4}	—	March 11, 2004	Palomar	NEAT	·	3.3 km	MPC · JPL
144399	2004 ES_{6}	—	March 12, 2004	Palomar	NEAT	·	3.0 km	MPC · JPL
144400	2004 EZ_{6}	—	March 12, 2004	Palomar	NEAT	·	1.3 km	MPC · JPL

== 144401–144500 ==
back to top

Designation			Discovery			Properties		Ref
Permanent	Provisional	Named after	Date	Site	Discoverer(s)	Category	Diam.	Ref
144401	2004 ED_{7}	—	March 12, 2004	Palomar	NEAT	·	2.1 km	MPC · JPL
144402	2004 EG_{7}	—	March 12, 2004	Palomar	NEAT	THM	4.5 km	MPC · JPL
144403	2004 EH_{7}	—	March 12, 2004	Palomar	NEAT	(5)	1.9 km	MPC · JPL
144404	2004 EK_{7}	—	March 12, 2004	Palomar	NEAT	·	2.2 km	MPC · JPL
144405	2004 EP_{7}	—	March 12, 2004	Palomar	NEAT	VER	6.2 km	MPC · JPL
144406	2004 EQ_{8}	—	March 13, 2004	Palomar	NEAT	·	2.8 km	MPC · JPL
144407	2004 EV_{8}	—	March 13, 2004	Palomar	NEAT	526	3.8 km	MPC · JPL
144408	2004 EZ_{8}	—	March 14, 2004	Palomar	NEAT	EOS	4.1 km	MPC · JPL
144409	2004 EC_{9}	—	March 14, 2004	Palomar	NEAT	·	2.4 km	MPC · JPL
144410	2004 EF_{9}	—	March 14, 2004	Palomar	NEAT	·	3.3 km	MPC · JPL
144411	2004 EW_{9}	—	March 15, 2004	Palomar	NEAT	APO +1km	1.7 km	MPC · JPL
144412	2004 EH_{10}	—	March 14, 2004	Kitt Peak	Spacewatch	·	3.2 km	MPC · JPL
144413	2004 EF_{11}	—	March 10, 2004	Palomar	NEAT	·	1.4 km	MPC · JPL
144414	2004 EM_{11}	—	March 10, 2004	Palomar	NEAT	·	4.3 km	MPC · JPL
144415	2004 ES_{11}	—	March 10, 2004	Palomar	NEAT	·	2.9 km	MPC · JPL
144416	2004 EZ_{11}	—	March 11, 2004	Palomar	NEAT	·	1.5 km	MPC · JPL
144417	2004 EU_{12}	—	March 11, 2004	Palomar	NEAT	·	4.6 km	MPC · JPL
144418	2004 EF_{14}	—	March 11, 2004	Palomar	NEAT	·	2.0 km	MPC · JPL
144419	2004 ER_{14}	—	March 11, 2004	Palomar	NEAT	BRA	3.8 km	MPC · JPL
144420	2004 ET_{14}	—	March 11, 2004	Palomar	NEAT	·	4.0 km	MPC · JPL
144421	2004 EU_{16}	—	March 12, 2004	Palomar	NEAT	·	5.6 km	MPC · JPL
144422	2004 EL_{18}	—	March 13, 2004	Palomar	NEAT	EUN	2.4 km	MPC · JPL
144423	2004 ET_{18}	—	March 14, 2004	Kitt Peak	Spacewatch	·	3.4 km	MPC · JPL
144424	2004 EU_{19}	—	March 14, 2004	Kitt Peak	Spacewatch	·	2.9 km	MPC · JPL
144425	2004 EH_{20}	—	March 15, 2004	Socorro	LINEAR	(7744)	2.4 km	MPC · JPL
144426	2004 EG_{23}	—	March 15, 2004	Catalina	CSS	·	5.6 km	MPC · JPL
144427	2004 EC_{26}	—	March 14, 2004	Socorro	LINEAR	·	2.4 km	MPC · JPL
144428	2004 EC_{27}	—	March 14, 2004	Catalina	CSS	·	2.1 km	MPC · JPL
144429	2004 EK_{28}	—	March 15, 2004	Kitt Peak	Spacewatch	·	4.1 km	MPC · JPL
144430	2004 EM_{31}	—	March 14, 2004	Palomar	NEAT	·	3.9 km	MPC · JPL
144431	2004 EP_{31}	—	March 14, 2004	Palomar	NEAT	·	2.5 km	MPC · JPL
144432	2004 EP_{32}	—	March 15, 2004	Palomar	NEAT	·	4.1 km	MPC · JPL
144433	2004 EC_{33}	—	March 15, 2004	Palomar	NEAT	MAR	1.7 km	MPC · JPL
144434	2004 EF_{33}	—	March 15, 2004	Palomar	NEAT	·	5.2 km	MPC · JPL
144435	2004 EV_{33}	—	March 11, 2004	Palomar	NEAT	KOR	2.8 km	MPC · JPL
144436	2004 ED_{34}	—	March 12, 2004	Palomar	NEAT	·	1.6 km	MPC · JPL
144437	2004 EH_{34}	—	March 12, 2004	Palomar	NEAT	AGN	2.1 km	MPC · JPL
144438	2004 EA_{35}	—	March 12, 2004	Palomar	NEAT	·	1.2 km	MPC · JPL
144439	2004 EB_{35}	—	March 12, 2004	Palomar	NEAT	·	3.5 km	MPC · JPL
144440	2004 EC_{35}	—	March 12, 2004	Palomar	NEAT	·	4.5 km	MPC · JPL
144441	2004 EM_{35}	—	March 12, 2004	Palomar	NEAT	·	4.7 km	MPC · JPL
144442	2004 EA_{37}	—	March 13, 2004	Palomar	NEAT	EOS	4.0 km	MPC · JPL
144443	2004 EG_{38}	—	March 14, 2004	Catalina	CSS	·	5.5 km	MPC · JPL
144444	2004 EN_{38}	—	March 14, 2004	Kitt Peak	Spacewatch	·	3.1 km	MPC · JPL
144445	2004 EQ_{38}	—	March 14, 2004	Kitt Peak	Spacewatch	·	4.1 km	MPC · JPL
144446	2004 EA_{39}	—	March 14, 2004	Catalina	CSS	TIR	3.4 km	MPC · JPL
144447	2004 EG_{39}	—	March 15, 2004	Kitt Peak	Spacewatch	·	3.0 km	MPC · JPL
144448	2004 EJ_{40}	—	March 15, 2004	Kitt Peak	Spacewatch	·	2.7 km	MPC · JPL
144449	2004 EV_{40}	—	March 15, 2004	Catalina	CSS	·	1.5 km	MPC · JPL
144450	2004 EX_{40}	—	March 15, 2004	Catalina	CSS	·	2.9 km	MPC · JPL
144451	2004 EA_{41}	—	March 15, 2004	Kitt Peak	Spacewatch	HOF	4.0 km	MPC · JPL
144452	2004 EC_{41}	—	March 15, 2004	Kitt Peak	Spacewatch	·	4.9 km	MPC · JPL
144453	2004 EQ_{41}	—	March 15, 2004	Catalina	CSS	·	2.5 km	MPC · JPL
144454	2004 EC_{42}	—	March 15, 2004	Catalina	CSS	·	1.8 km	MPC · JPL
144455	2004 EF_{42}	—	March 15, 2004	Catalina	CSS	BRA	2.4 km	MPC · JPL
144456	2004 EZ_{42}	—	March 15, 2004	Catalina	CSS	KOR	2.5 km	MPC · JPL
144457	2004 EQ_{43}	—	March 15, 2004	Catalina	CSS	·	5.1 km	MPC · JPL
144458	2004 ET_{43}	—	March 11, 2004	Palomar	NEAT	·	1.7 km	MPC · JPL
144459	2004 EW_{43}	—	March 12, 2004	Palomar	NEAT	fast	4.3 km	MPC · JPL
144460	2004 EZ_{43}	—	March 12, 2004	Palomar	NEAT	·	2.3 km	MPC · JPL
144461	2004 EO_{44}	—	March 14, 2004	Kitt Peak	Spacewatch	NYS	1.3 km	MPC · JPL
144462	2004 EP_{47}	—	March 15, 2004	Catalina	CSS	·	3.3 km	MPC · JPL
144463	2004 EA_{48}	—	March 15, 2004	Socorro	LINEAR	·	5.0 km	MPC · JPL
144464	2004 EL_{48}	—	March 15, 2004	Socorro	LINEAR	·	2.6 km	MPC · JPL
144465	2004 EM_{48}	—	March 15, 2004	Socorro	LINEAR	WIT	1.8 km	MPC · JPL
144466	2004 EO_{49}	—	March 15, 2004	Catalina	CSS	·	2.9 km	MPC · JPL
144467	2004 EV_{51}	—	March 15, 2004	Socorro	LINEAR	·	1.9 km	MPC · JPL
144468	2004 ET_{52}	—	March 15, 2004	Catalina	CSS	·	2.2 km	MPC · JPL
144469	2004 EC_{55}	—	March 14, 2004	Palomar	NEAT	·	6.2 km	MPC · JPL
144470	2004 ED_{55}	—	March 14, 2004	Palomar	NEAT	·	3.3 km	MPC · JPL
144471	2004 EE_{55}	—	March 14, 2004	Palomar	NEAT	·	2.8 km	MPC · JPL
144472	2004 EW_{55}	—	March 14, 2004	Palomar	NEAT	·	3.9 km	MPC · JPL
144473	2004 ED_{56}	—	March 14, 2004	Palomar	NEAT	·	3.8 km	MPC · JPL
144474	2004 EE_{56}	—	March 14, 2004	Palomar	NEAT	·	1.4 km	MPC · JPL
144475	2004 EJ_{56}	—	March 14, 2004	Palomar	NEAT	·	6.0 km	MPC · JPL
144476	2004 EK_{56}	—	March 14, 2004	Palomar	NEAT	·	3.1 km	MPC · JPL
144477	2004 EL_{56}	—	March 14, 2004	Palomar	NEAT	·	4.5 km	MPC · JPL
144478	2004 ER_{56}	—	March 14, 2004	Palomar	NEAT	·	1.8 km	MPC · JPL
144479	2004 EW_{57}	—	March 15, 2004	Kitt Peak	Spacewatch	URS · fast	5.3 km	MPC · JPL
144480	2004 ET_{58}	—	March 15, 2004	Palomar	NEAT	·	7.3 km	MPC · JPL
144481	2004 EV_{58}	—	March 15, 2004	Palomar	NEAT	·	7.9 km	MPC · JPL
144482	2004 EW_{59}	—	March 15, 2004	Catalina	CSS	·	5.1 km	MPC · JPL
144483	2004 EE_{60}	—	March 15, 2004	Palomar	NEAT	·	3.8 km	MPC · JPL
144484	2004 ER_{61}	—	March 12, 2004	Palomar	NEAT	KOR	2.2 km	MPC · JPL
144485	2004 ES_{61}	—	March 12, 2004	Palomar	NEAT	·	2.9 km	MPC · JPL
144486	2004 EC_{63}	—	March 13, 2004	Palomar	NEAT	·	3.0 km	MPC · JPL
144487	2004 EO_{63}	—	March 13, 2004	Palomar	NEAT	NYS	1.5 km	MPC · JPL
144488	2004 EP_{63}	—	March 13, 2004	Palomar	NEAT	·	3.3 km	MPC · JPL
144489	2004 EW_{63}	—	March 13, 2004	Palomar	NEAT	·	4.9 km	MPC · JPL
144490	2004 EX_{63}	—	March 13, 2004	Palomar	NEAT	·	3.0 km	MPC · JPL
144491	2004 EF_{65}	—	March 14, 2004	Socorro	LINEAR	·	7.6 km	MPC · JPL
144492	2004 EQ_{65}	—	March 14, 2004	Socorro	LINEAR	EUN	2.8 km	MPC · JPL
144493	2004 ES_{65}	—	March 14, 2004	Kitt Peak	Spacewatch	·	1.6 km	MPC · JPL
144494	2004 EW_{65}	—	March 14, 2004	Kitt Peak	Spacewatch	·	2.4 km	MPC · JPL
144495	2004 EP_{66}	—	March 14, 2004	Palomar	NEAT	·	1.3 km	MPC · JPL
144496 Reingard	2004 EZ_{66}	Reingard	March 14, 2004	Wildberg	R. Apitzsch	ADE	3.2 km	MPC · JPL
144497	2004 EO_{67}	—	March 15, 2004	Kitt Peak	Spacewatch	AGN	1.6 km	MPC · JPL
144498	2004 ES_{67}	—	March 15, 2004	Kitt Peak	Spacewatch	·	1.5 km	MPC · JPL
144499	2004 EE_{68}	—	March 15, 2004	Socorro	LINEAR	KOR	2.4 km	MPC · JPL
144500	2004 EV_{68}	—	March 15, 2004	Socorro	LINEAR	·	2.7 km	MPC · JPL

== 144501–144600 ==
back to top

Designation			Discovery			Properties		Ref
Permanent	Provisional	Named after	Date	Site	Discoverer(s)	Category	Diam.	Ref
144501	2004 EF_{69}	—	March 15, 2004	Socorro	LINEAR	TIR	4.7 km	MPC · JPL
144502	2004 EO_{69}	—	March 15, 2004	Kitt Peak	Spacewatch	·	2.2 km	MPC · JPL
144503	2004 EY_{69}	—	March 15, 2004	Kitt Peak	Spacewatch	·	2.8 km	MPC · JPL
144504	2004 EA_{70}	—	March 15, 2004	Kitt Peak	Spacewatch	·	3.0 km	MPC · JPL
144505	2004 ES_{71}	—	March 15, 2004	Catalina	CSS	·	2.3 km	MPC · JPL
144506	2004 EY_{71}	—	March 15, 2004	Socorro	LINEAR	·	1.5 km	MPC · JPL
144507	2004 EZ_{71}	—	March 15, 2004	Catalina	CSS	·	2.6 km	MPC · JPL
144508	2004 EC_{72}	—	March 15, 2004	Catalina	CSS	·	5.2 km	MPC · JPL
144509	2004 ER_{73}	—	March 15, 2004	Kitt Peak	Spacewatch	·	4.5 km	MPC · JPL
144510	2004 EM_{75}	—	March 14, 2004	Kitt Peak	Spacewatch	·	3.1 km	MPC · JPL
144511	2004 EO_{75}	—	March 14, 2004	Kitt Peak	Spacewatch	·	4.3 km	MPC · JPL
144512	2004 EQ_{75}	—	March 14, 2004	Kitt Peak	Spacewatch	·	5.8 km	MPC · JPL
144513	2004 ES_{75}	—	March 14, 2004	Palomar	NEAT	·	4.9 km	MPC · JPL
144514	2004 ET_{75}	—	March 14, 2004	Palomar	NEAT	·	3.5 km	MPC · JPL
144515	2004 EY_{76}	—	March 15, 2004	Catalina	CSS	·	2.6 km	MPC · JPL
144516	2004 EH_{77}	—	March 15, 2004	Socorro	LINEAR	·	2.1 km	MPC · JPL
144517	2004 EN_{77}	—	March 15, 2004	Catalina	CSS	·	3.5 km	MPC · JPL
144518	2004 EF_{78}	—	March 15, 2004	Catalina	CSS	·	4.0 km	MPC · JPL
144519	2004 EM_{78}	—	March 15, 2004	Catalina	CSS	·	3.6 km	MPC · JPL
144520	2004 EO_{78}	—	March 15, 2004	Catalina	CSS	·	1.5 km	MPC · JPL
144521	2004 ED_{79}	—	March 15, 2004	Palomar	NEAT	·	6.9 km	MPC · JPL
144522	2004 EF_{79}	—	March 15, 2004	Catalina	CSS	HNS	2.2 km	MPC · JPL
144523	2004 EK_{79}	—	March 15, 2004	Catalina	CSS	·	2.4 km	MPC · JPL
144524	2004 ER_{79}	—	March 15, 2004	Palomar	NEAT	fast	3.8 km	MPC · JPL
144525	2004 EF_{80}	—	March 14, 2004	Socorro	LINEAR	·	2.6 km	MPC · JPL
144526	2004 ER_{80}	—	March 15, 2004	Socorro	LINEAR	·	2.5 km	MPC · JPL
144527	2004 EX_{80}	—	March 15, 2004	Socorro	LINEAR	·	3.2 km	MPC · JPL
144528	2004 EF_{81}	—	March 15, 2004	Socorro	LINEAR	·	5.4 km	MPC · JPL
144529	2004 EH_{81}	—	March 15, 2004	Socorro	LINEAR	·	6.6 km	MPC · JPL
144530	2004 EG_{82}	—	March 15, 2004	Desert Eagle	W. K. Y. Yeung	·	4.0 km	MPC · JPL
144531	2004 EN_{82}	—	March 15, 2004	Kitt Peak	Spacewatch	EUN	3.0 km	MPC · JPL
144532	2004 EX_{82}	—	March 13, 2004	Palomar	NEAT	·	6.7 km	MPC · JPL
144533	2004 EB_{83}	—	March 14, 2004	Socorro	LINEAR	·	3.3 km	MPC · JPL
144534	2004 EM_{83}	—	March 14, 2004	Kitt Peak	Spacewatch	·	1.6 km	MPC · JPL
144535	2004 ER_{83}	—	March 14, 2004	Kitt Peak	Spacewatch	·	3.2 km	MPC · JPL
144536	2004 EZ_{83}	—	March 14, 2004	Palomar	NEAT	·	2.6 km	MPC · JPL
144537	2004 EB_{84}	—	March 14, 2004	Kitt Peak	Spacewatch	·	3.0 km	MPC · JPL
144538	2004 EQ_{84}	—	March 15, 2004	Socorro	LINEAR	·	1.6 km	MPC · JPL
144539	2004 EZ_{85}	—	March 15, 2004	Socorro	LINEAR	·	3.4 km	MPC · JPL
144540	2004 EV_{86}	—	March 15, 2004	Kitt Peak	Spacewatch	NYS	1.9 km	MPC · JPL
144541	2004 EZ_{93}	—	March 15, 2004	Socorro	LINEAR	·	4.6 km	MPC · JPL
144542	2004 EQ_{94}	—	March 15, 2004	Socorro	LINEAR	NAE	4.1 km	MPC · JPL
144543	2004 EV_{94}	—	March 15, 2004	Socorro	LINEAR	·	4.4 km	MPC · JPL
144544	2004 EM_{95}	—	March 15, 2004	Catalina	CSS	NYS	2.0 km	MPC · JPL
144545	2004 EZ_{95}	—	March 14, 2004	Socorro	LINEAR	MAR	1.8 km	MPC · JPL
144546	2004 EP_{101}	—	March 15, 2004	Kitt Peak	Spacewatch	·	3.3 km	MPC · JPL
144547	2004 ED_{103}	—	March 15, 2004	Kitt Peak	Spacewatch	·	2.6 km	MPC · JPL
144548	2004 ED_{105}	—	March 15, 2004	Kitt Peak	Spacewatch	·	4.5 km	MPC · JPL
144549	2004 EJ_{112}	—	March 15, 2004	Socorro	LINEAR	EOS	3.2 km	MPC · JPL
144550	2004 EJ_{114}	—	March 9, 2004	Palomar	NEAT	·	4.3 km	MPC · JPL
144551	2004 EL_{115}	—	March 14, 2004	Socorro	LINEAR	·	1.8 km	MPC · JPL
144552 Jackiesue	2004 FS_{4}	Jackiesue	March 19, 2004	Antares	R. Holmes	·	3.6 km	MPC · JPL
144553	2004 FB_{6}	—	March 23, 2004	Emerald Lane	L. Ball	·	3.1 km	MPC · JPL
144554	2004 FP_{6}	—	March 16, 2004	Catalina	CSS	·	4.5 km	MPC · JPL
144555	2004 FQ_{8}	—	March 16, 2004	Socorro	LINEAR	NYS	1.7 km	MPC · JPL
144556	2004 FT_{8}	—	March 16, 2004	Socorro	LINEAR	·	4.8 km	MPC · JPL
144557	2004 FW_{8}	—	March 16, 2004	Socorro	LINEAR	·	4.2 km	MPC · JPL
144558	2004 FU_{9}	—	March 16, 2004	Kitt Peak	Spacewatch	·	2.7 km	MPC · JPL
144559	2004 FK_{10}	—	March 16, 2004	Campo Imperatore	CINEOS	·	3.0 km	MPC · JPL
144560	2004 FH_{12}	—	March 16, 2004	Catalina	CSS	EOS	3.2 km	MPC · JPL
144561	2004 FK_{12}	—	March 16, 2004	Socorro	LINEAR	·	3.2 km	MPC · JPL
144562	2004 FS_{12}	—	March 16, 2004	Catalina	CSS	·	1.8 km	MPC · JPL
144563	2004 FV_{12}	—	March 16, 2004	Catalina	CSS	(2076)	2.0 km	MPC · JPL
144564	2004 FE_{13}	—	March 16, 2004	Catalina	CSS	slow	2.7 km	MPC · JPL
144565	2004 FH_{13}	—	March 16, 2004	Catalina	CSS	DOR	5.2 km	MPC · JPL
144566	2004 FT_{13}	—	March 16, 2004	Socorro	LINEAR	NEM	4.0 km	MPC · JPL
144567	2004 FE_{14}	—	March 16, 2004	Kitt Peak	Spacewatch	·	3.0 km	MPC · JPL
144568	2004 FN_{14}	—	March 16, 2004	Catalina	CSS	·	3.9 km	MPC · JPL
144569	2004 FO_{14}	—	March 16, 2004	Catalina	CSS	·	5.2 km	MPC · JPL
144570	2004 FX_{18}	—	March 16, 2004	Valmeca	Valmeca	·	3.5 km	MPC · JPL
144571	2004 FA_{20}	—	March 16, 2004	Socorro	LINEAR	·	1.8 km	MPC · JPL
144572	2004 FH_{20}	—	March 16, 2004	Socorro	LINEAR	·	2.3 km	MPC · JPL
144573	2004 FG_{21}	—	March 16, 2004	Socorro	LINEAR	HYG	5.5 km	MPC · JPL
144574	2004 FS_{22}	—	March 16, 2004	Campo Imperatore	CINEOS	·	2.2 km	MPC · JPL
144575	2004 FR_{25}	—	March 17, 2004	Socorro	LINEAR	·	5.6 km	MPC · JPL
144576	2004 FH_{27}	—	March 17, 2004	Kitt Peak	Spacewatch	·	1.5 km	MPC · JPL
144577	2004 FB_{28}	—	March 17, 2004	Kitt Peak	Spacewatch	·	2.1 km	MPC · JPL
144578	2004 FH_{28}	—	March 18, 2004	Socorro	LINEAR	·	3.4 km	MPC · JPL
144579	2004 FO_{32}	—	March 30, 2004	Kitt Peak	Spacewatch	·	2.3 km	MPC · JPL
144580	2004 FY_{32}	—	March 16, 2004	Catalina	CSS	·	1.7 km	MPC · JPL
144581	2004 FG_{34}	—	March 16, 2004	Socorro	LINEAR	MAS	1.2 km	MPC · JPL
144582	2004 FG_{35}	—	March 16, 2004	Kitt Peak	Spacewatch	·	1.2 km	MPC · JPL
144583	2004 FR_{35}	—	March 16, 2004	Socorro	LINEAR	EOS	2.8 km	MPC · JPL
144584	2004 FV_{35}	—	March 16, 2004	Socorro	LINEAR	·	7.7 km	MPC · JPL
144585	2004 FJ_{38}	—	March 17, 2004	Socorro	LINEAR	MRX	1.8 km	MPC · JPL
144586	2004 FP_{38}	—	March 17, 2004	Socorro	LINEAR	·	2.9 km	MPC · JPL
144587	2004 FV_{38}	—	March 17, 2004	Socorro	LINEAR	·	2.7 km	MPC · JPL
144588	2004 FY_{38}	—	March 17, 2004	Socorro	LINEAR	·	2.7 km	MPC · JPL
144589	2004 FJ_{41}	—	March 18, 2004	Socorro	LINEAR	·	3.4 km	MPC · JPL
144590	2004 FM_{41}	—	March 18, 2004	Socorro	LINEAR	·	2.7 km	MPC · JPL
144591	2004 FV_{41}	—	March 16, 2004	Kitt Peak	Spacewatch	·	2.0 km	MPC · JPL
144592	2004 FG_{42}	—	March 17, 2004	Kitt Peak	Spacewatch	·	3.6 km	MPC · JPL
144593	2004 FB_{44}	—	March 16, 2004	Socorro	LINEAR	·	2.6 km	MPC · JPL
144594	2004 FD_{44}	—	March 16, 2004	Socorro	LINEAR	·	2.0 km	MPC · JPL
144595	2004 FQ_{44}	—	March 16, 2004	Socorro	LINEAR	·	1.7 km	MPC · JPL
144596	2004 FR_{44}	—	March 16, 2004	Socorro	LINEAR	·	1.5 km	MPC · JPL
144597	2004 FS_{44}	—	March 16, 2004	Socorro	LINEAR	VER	6.1 km	MPC · JPL
144598	2004 FY_{44}	—	March 16, 2004	Socorro	LINEAR	·	6.0 km	MPC · JPL
144599	2004 FZ_{44}	—	March 16, 2004	Socorro	LINEAR	(13314)	4.3 km	MPC · JPL
144600	2004 FM_{45}	—	March 16, 2004	Socorro	LINEAR	·	2.2 km	MPC · JPL

== 144601–144700 ==
back to top

Designation			Discovery			Properties		Ref
Permanent	Provisional	Named after	Date	Site	Discoverer(s)	Category	Diam.	Ref
144601	2004 FH_{46}	—	March 17, 2004	Kitt Peak	Spacewatch	·	2.5 km	MPC · JPL
144602	2004 FV_{47}	—	March 18, 2004	Socorro	LINEAR	·	1.8 km	MPC · JPL
144603	2004 FZ_{47}	—	March 18, 2004	Socorro	LINEAR	·	3.0 km	MPC · JPL
144604	2004 FW_{48}	—	March 18, 2004	Socorro	LINEAR	·	1.8 km	MPC · JPL
144605	2004 FX_{49}	—	March 18, 2004	Socorro	LINEAR	·	2.1 km	MPC · JPL
144606	2004 FF_{50}	—	March 18, 2004	Socorro	LINEAR	·	6.3 km	MPC · JPL
144607	2004 FW_{51}	—	March 19, 2004	Socorro	LINEAR	·	2.7 km	MPC · JPL
144608	2004 FN_{52}	—	March 19, 2004	Socorro	LINEAR	·	3.2 km	MPC · JPL
144609	2004 FT_{52}	—	March 19, 2004	Socorro	LINEAR	·	2.5 km	MPC · JPL
144610	2004 FV_{52}	—	March 19, 2004	Socorro	LINEAR	·	3.1 km	MPC · JPL
144611	2004 FZ_{52}	—	March 19, 2004	Socorro	LINEAR	·	1.3 km	MPC · JPL
144612	2004 FD_{56}	—	March 16, 2004	Socorro	LINEAR	·	3.9 km	MPC · JPL
144613	2004 FJ_{58}	—	March 17, 2004	Socorro	LINEAR	·	3.9 km	MPC · JPL
144614	2004 FM_{61}	—	March 19, 2004	Socorro	LINEAR	KOR	2.5 km	MPC · JPL
144615	2004 FD_{62}	—	March 19, 2004	Socorro	LINEAR	MIS	5.1 km	MPC · JPL
144616	2004 FJ_{62}	—	March 19, 2004	Socorro	LINEAR	·	1.9 km	MPC · JPL
144617	2004 FD_{63}	—	March 19, 2004	Socorro	LINEAR	·	3.3 km	MPC · JPL
144618	2004 FB_{65}	—	March 19, 2004	Socorro	LINEAR	·	3.4 km	MPC · JPL
144619	2004 FR_{65}	—	March 19, 2004	Socorro	LINEAR	·	2.3 km	MPC · JPL
144620	2004 FU_{65}	—	March 19, 2004	Socorro	LINEAR	KOR	2.3 km	MPC · JPL
144621	2004 FU_{66}	—	March 20, 2004	Socorro	LINEAR	·	2.7 km	MPC · JPL
144622	2004 FZ_{66}	—	March 20, 2004	Socorro	LINEAR	PAD	2.9 km	MPC · JPL
144623	2004 FO_{68}	—	March 21, 2004	Kitt Peak	Spacewatch	·	2.5 km	MPC · JPL
144624	2004 FP_{68}	—	March 21, 2004	Kitt Peak	Spacewatch	·	5.3 km	MPC · JPL
144625	2004 FK_{69}	—	March 16, 2004	Kitt Peak	Spacewatch	·	2.9 km	MPC · JPL
144626	2004 FG_{70}	—	March 16, 2004	Kitt Peak	Spacewatch	·	5.5 km	MPC · JPL
144627	2004 FK_{71}	—	March 17, 2004	Kitt Peak	Spacewatch	·	3.1 km	MPC · JPL
144628	2004 FE_{77}	—	March 18, 2004	Socorro	LINEAR	·	1.5 km	MPC · JPL
144629	2004 FJ_{77}	—	March 18, 2004	Socorro	LINEAR	·	3.0 km	MPC · JPL
144630	2004 FU_{77}	—	March 18, 2004	Socorro	LINEAR	·	2.6 km	MPC · JPL
144631	2004 FX_{77}	—	March 19, 2004	Socorro	LINEAR	·	1.6 km	MPC · JPL
144632	2004 FM_{79}	—	March 19, 2004	Kitt Peak	Spacewatch	·	1.9 km	MPC · JPL
144633 Georgecarroll	2004 FH_{80}	Georgecarroll	March 21, 2004	Stony Ridge	Stony Ridge	EUN	3.4 km	MPC · JPL
144634	2004 FJ_{80}	—	March 22, 2004	Socorro	LINEAR	·	3.5 km	MPC · JPL
144635	2004 FG_{85}	—	March 18, 2004	Kitt Peak	Spacewatch	MAR	2.0 km	MPC · JPL
144636	2004 FP_{88}	—	March 20, 2004	Kitt Peak	Spacewatch	NEM	3.2 km	MPC · JPL
144637	2004 FS_{90}	—	March 20, 2004	Siding Spring	SSS	·	3.0 km	MPC · JPL
144638	2004 FB_{93}	—	March 19, 2004	Socorro	LINEAR	·	4.1 km	MPC · JPL
144639	2004 FH_{93}	—	March 20, 2004	Socorro	LINEAR	·	4.0 km	MPC · JPL
144640	2004 FO_{93}	—	March 22, 2004	Socorro	LINEAR	·	3.8 km	MPC · JPL
144641	2004 FN_{94}	—	March 23, 2004	Kitt Peak	Spacewatch	·	1.6 km	MPC · JPL
144642	2004 FO_{96}	—	March 23, 2004	Socorro	LINEAR	·	2.6 km	MPC · JPL
144643	2004 FV_{97}	—	March 23, 2004	Socorro	LINEAR	·	4.8 km	MPC · JPL
144644	2004 FT_{99}	—	March 22, 2004	Socorro	LINEAR	·	2.8 km	MPC · JPL
144645	2004 FZ_{100}	—	March 23, 2004	Socorro	LINEAR	·	2.6 km	MPC · JPL
144646	2004 FB_{102}	—	March 19, 2004	Socorro	LINEAR	·	4.6 km	MPC · JPL
144647	2004 FT_{102}	—	March 23, 2004	Kitt Peak	Spacewatch	·	1.7 km	MPC · JPL
144648	2004 FH_{105}	—	March 24, 2004	Siding Spring	SSS	EUP	6.3 km	MPC · JPL
144649	2004 FO_{105}	—	March 24, 2004	Siding Spring	SSS	EUN	2.5 km	MPC · JPL
144650	2004 FX_{105}	—	March 25, 2004	Socorro	LINEAR	·	2.6 km	MPC · JPL
144651	2004 FE_{106}	—	March 26, 2004	Kitt Peak	Spacewatch	·	1.5 km	MPC · JPL
144652	2004 FF_{106}	—	March 26, 2004	Kitt Peak	Spacewatch	·	6.0 km	MPC · JPL
144653	2004 FD_{108}	—	March 23, 2004	Socorro	LINEAR	·	2.6 km	MPC · JPL
144654	2004 FV_{108}	—	March 23, 2004	Kitt Peak	Spacewatch	WIT	1.6 km	MPC · JPL
144655	2004 FE_{110}	—	March 24, 2004	Anderson Mesa	LONEOS	·	2.5 km	MPC · JPL
144656	2004 FS_{110}	—	March 25, 2004	Anderson Mesa	LONEOS	615	2.0 km	MPC · JPL
144657	2004 FO_{112}	—	March 26, 2004	Kitt Peak	Spacewatch	·	1.4 km	MPC · JPL
144658	2004 FF_{116}	—	March 23, 2004	Socorro	LINEAR	EOS	3.6 km	MPC · JPL
144659	2004 FP_{116}	—	March 23, 2004	Socorro	LINEAR	TIR	4.2 km	MPC · JPL
144660	2004 FO_{117}	—	March 27, 2004	Socorro	LINEAR	·	3.7 km	MPC · JPL
144661	2004 FU_{117}	—	March 22, 2004	Socorro	LINEAR	HOF	5.0 km	MPC · JPL
144662	2004 FA_{121}	—	March 23, 2004	Socorro	LINEAR	·	2.2 km	MPC · JPL
144663	2004 FT_{121}	—	March 24, 2004	Anderson Mesa	LONEOS	·	2.1 km	MPC · JPL
144664	2004 FV_{122}	—	March 26, 2004	Socorro	LINEAR	·	3.4 km	MPC · JPL
144665	2004 FO_{125}	—	March 27, 2004	Socorro	LINEAR	EOS	2.7 km	MPC · JPL
144666	2004 FQ_{125}	—	March 27, 2004	Socorro	LINEAR	·	1.8 km	MPC · JPL
144667	2004 FQ_{127}	—	March 27, 2004	Socorro	LINEAR	THM	4.1 km	MPC · JPL
144668	2004 FK_{128}	—	March 27, 2004	Catalina	CSS	·	2.7 km	MPC · JPL
144669	2004 FN_{129}	—	March 16, 2004	Socorro	LINEAR	·	3.5 km	MPC · JPL
144670	2004 FB_{130}	—	March 21, 2004	Kitt Peak	Spacewatch	·	3.5 km	MPC · JPL
144671	2004 FE_{130}	—	March 22, 2004	Anderson Mesa	LONEOS	·	7.8 km	MPC · JPL
144672	2004 FS_{130}	—	March 22, 2004	Anderson Mesa	LONEOS	EUP	8.1 km	MPC · JPL
144673	2004 FA_{131}	—	March 22, 2004	Anderson Mesa	LONEOS	·	8.0 km	MPC · JPL
144674	2004 FN_{131}	—	March 22, 2004	Anderson Mesa	LONEOS	·	1.9 km	MPC · JPL
144675	2004 FZ_{132}	—	March 23, 2004	Socorro	LINEAR	·	5.9 km	MPC · JPL
144676	2004 FU_{134}	—	March 26, 2004	Socorro	LINEAR	·	6.4 km	MPC · JPL
144677	2004 FM_{136}	—	March 27, 2004	Anderson Mesa	LONEOS	ADE	3.5 km	MPC · JPL
144678	2004 FG_{137}	—	March 29, 2004	Kitt Peak	Spacewatch	·	3.2 km	MPC · JPL
144679	2004 FH_{140}	—	March 27, 2004	Anderson Mesa	LONEOS	·	3.0 km	MPC · JPL
144680	2004 FP_{140}	—	March 27, 2004	Anderson Mesa	LONEOS	MRX	1.7 km	MPC · JPL
144681	2004 FR_{141}	—	March 27, 2004	Socorro	LINEAR	·	2.3 km	MPC · JPL
144682	2004 FN_{142}	—	March 27, 2004	Socorro	LINEAR	·	3.0 km	MPC · JPL
144683	2004 FS_{142}	—	March 27, 2004	Socorro	LINEAR	HYG	4.9 km	MPC · JPL
144684	2004 FA_{143}	—	March 27, 2004	Socorro	LINEAR	·	4.3 km	MPC · JPL
144685	2004 FE_{144}	—	March 29, 2004	Catalina	CSS	BRA	3.0 km	MPC · JPL
144686	2004 FG_{144}	—	March 29, 2004	Catalina	CSS	·	8.2 km	MPC · JPL
144687	2004 FE_{145}	—	March 29, 2004	Socorro	LINEAR	MAR	2.0 km	MPC · JPL
144688	2004 FG_{145}	—	March 29, 2004	Kitt Peak	Deep Lens Survey	·	2.4 km	MPC · JPL
144689	2004 FD_{146}	—	March 31, 2004	Socorro	LINEAR	THM	6.8 km	MPC · JPL
144690	2004 FV_{147}	—	March 16, 2004	Palomar	NEAT	·	7.0 km	MPC · JPL
144691	2004 FR_{154}	—	March 17, 2004	Socorro	LINEAR	·	3.4 km	MPC · JPL
144692 Katemary	2004 GC	Katemary	April 9, 2004	Wrightwood	J. W. Young	·	2.3 km	MPC · JPL
144693	2004 GF	—	April 8, 2004	Siding Spring	SSS	·	2.6 km	MPC · JPL
144694	2004 GL_{1}	—	April 10, 2004	Catalina	CSS	(31811)	5.0 km	MPC · JPL
144695	2004 GY_{2}	—	April 8, 2004	Siding Spring	SSS	·	7.0 km	MPC · JPL
144696	2004 GZ_{3}	—	April 11, 2004	Palomar	NEAT	·	2.2 km	MPC · JPL
144697	2004 GZ_{5}	—	April 12, 2004	Kitt Peak	Spacewatch	·	1.9 km	MPC · JPL
144698	2004 GX_{10}	—	April 8, 2004	Palomar	NEAT	·	2.9 km	MPC · JPL
144699	2004 GE_{11}	—	April 12, 2004	Siding Spring	SSS	·	4.1 km	MPC · JPL
144700	2004 GF_{13}	—	April 12, 2004	Kitt Peak	Spacewatch	·	4.1 km	MPC · JPL

== 144701–144800 ==
back to top

Designation			Discovery			Properties		Ref
Permanent	Provisional	Named after	Date	Site	Discoverer(s)	Category	Diam.	Ref
144701	2004 GF_{14}	—	April 13, 2004	Catalina	CSS	·	3.8 km	MPC · JPL
144702	2004 GS_{15}	—	April 9, 2004	Palomar	NEAT	EUN	2.6 km	MPC · JPL
144703	2004 GY_{15}	—	April 9, 2004	Siding Spring	SSS	·	2.4 km	MPC · JPL
144704	2004 GA_{17}	—	April 10, 2004	Palomar	NEAT	JUN	2.0 km	MPC · JPL
144705	2004 GE_{18}	—	April 12, 2004	Catalina	CSS	·	3.7 km	MPC · JPL
144706	2004 GF_{18}	—	April 12, 2004	Palomar	NEAT	·	4.2 km	MPC · JPL
144707	2004 GG_{18}	—	April 12, 2004	Catalina	CSS	·	5.8 km	MPC · JPL
144708	2004 GM_{18}	—	April 13, 2004	Catalina	CSS	EOS	4.1 km	MPC · JPL
144709	2004 GL_{21}	—	April 11, 2004	Palomar	NEAT	·	2.6 km	MPC · JPL
144710	2004 GR_{21}	—	April 11, 2004	Palomar	NEAT	·	2.6 km	MPC · JPL
144711	2004 GV_{21}	—	April 12, 2004	Catalina	CSS	·	4.5 km	MPC · JPL
144712	2004 GN_{22}	—	April 12, 2004	Palomar	NEAT	·	2.8 km	MPC · JPL
144713	2004 GF_{23}	—	April 12, 2004	Kitt Peak	Spacewatch	·	1.2 km	MPC · JPL
144714	2004 GH_{24}	—	April 13, 2004	Catalina	CSS	GEF	2.4 km	MPC · JPL
144715	2004 GN_{26}	—	April 14, 2004	Anderson Mesa	LONEOS	·	3.7 km	MPC · JPL
144716 Scotttucker	2004 GW_{28}	Scotttucker	April 13, 2004	Goodricke-Pigott	Reddy, V.	·	3.9 km	MPC · JPL
144717	2004 GG_{29}	—	April 12, 2004	Palomar	NEAT	·	3.0 km	MPC · JPL
144718	2004 GR_{30}	—	April 12, 2004	Anderson Mesa	LONEOS	·	2.2 km	MPC · JPL
144719	2004 GC_{31}	—	April 13, 2004	Kitt Peak	Spacewatch	·	3.1 km	MPC · JPL
144720	2004 GE_{32}	—	April 12, 2004	Palomar	NEAT	·	3.8 km	MPC · JPL
144721	2004 GD_{34}	—	April 12, 2004	Palomar	NEAT	·	5.6 km	MPC · JPL
144722	2004 GL_{34}	—	April 13, 2004	Palomar	NEAT	·	2.8 km	MPC · JPL
144723	2004 GQ_{34}	—	April 13, 2004	Kitt Peak	Spacewatch	·	2.1 km	MPC · JPL
144724	2004 GX_{34}	—	April 13, 2004	Palomar	NEAT	TIR	4.6 km	MPC · JPL
144725	2004 GL_{35}	—	April 13, 2004	Kitt Peak	Spacewatch	·	2.6 km	MPC · JPL
144726	2004 GN_{35}	—	April 13, 2004	Palomar	NEAT	·	3.4 km	MPC · JPL
144727	2004 GS_{36}	—	April 13, 2004	Palomar	NEAT	·	4.1 km	MPC · JPL
144728	2004 GE_{37}	—	April 14, 2004	Anderson Mesa	LONEOS	·	3.9 km	MPC · JPL
144729	2004 GU_{37}	—	April 14, 2004	Anderson Mesa	LONEOS	·	4.2 km	MPC · JPL
144730	2004 GZ_{38}	—	April 15, 2004	Anderson Mesa	LONEOS	·	5.0 km	MPC · JPL
144731	2004 GA_{39}	—	April 15, 2004	Anderson Mesa	LONEOS	GEF	1.6 km	MPC · JPL
144732	2004 GN_{40}	—	April 12, 2004	Anderson Mesa	LONEOS	THM	3.7 km	MPC · JPL
144733	2004 GS_{40}	—	April 12, 2004	Palomar	NEAT	·	3.1 km	MPC · JPL
144734	2004 GM_{41}	—	April 13, 2004	Kitt Peak	Spacewatch	KOR	2.1 km	MPC · JPL
144735	2004 GB_{42}	—	April 14, 2004	Kitt Peak	Spacewatch	·	3.4 km	MPC · JPL
144736	2004 GG_{42}	—	April 14, 2004	Kitt Peak	Spacewatch	·	4.6 km	MPC · JPL
144737	2004 GY_{42}	—	April 15, 2004	Socorro	LINEAR	·	3.9 km	MPC · JPL
144738	2004 GB_{50}	—	April 12, 2004	Kitt Peak	Spacewatch	·	2.5 km	MPC · JPL
144739	2004 GM_{50}	—	April 12, 2004	Kitt Peak	Spacewatch	·	2.8 km	MPC · JPL
144740	2004 GU_{51}	—	April 13, 2004	Kitt Peak	Spacewatch	·	4.7 km	MPC · JPL
144741	2004 GL_{59}	—	April 12, 2004	Anderson Mesa	LONEOS	·	4.1 km	MPC · JPL
144742	2004 GZ_{60}	—	April 15, 2004	Anderson Mesa	LONEOS	·	2.7 km	MPC · JPL
144743	2004 GD_{61}	—	April 15, 2004	Anderson Mesa	LONEOS	fast	3.7 km	MPC · JPL
144744	2004 GC_{62}	—	April 13, 2004	Kitt Peak	Spacewatch	·	2.6 km	MPC · JPL
144745	2004 GR_{65}	—	April 13, 2004	Kitt Peak	Spacewatch	·	2.0 km	MPC · JPL
144746	2004 GA_{67}	—	April 13, 2004	Kitt Peak	Spacewatch	·	2.6 km	MPC · JPL
144747	2004 GX_{74}	—	April 15, 2004	Palomar	NEAT	·	2.4 km	MPC · JPL
144748	2004 GR_{80}	—	April 13, 2004	Kitt Peak	Spacewatch	·	1.7 km	MPC · JPL
144749	2004 GF_{83}	—	April 14, 2004	Kitt Peak	Spacewatch	KOR	2.1 km	MPC · JPL
144750	2004 GN_{87}	—	April 15, 2004	Socorro	LINEAR	·	3.7 km	MPC · JPL
144751	2004 GZ_{87}	—	April 13, 2004	Palomar	NEAT	·	3.4 km	MPC · JPL
144752 Plungė	2004 HK	Plungė	April 16, 2004	Moletai	K. Černis, Zdanavicius, J.	·	2.9 km	MPC · JPL
144753	2004 HF_{1}	—	April 16, 2004	Socorro	LINEAR	·	3.7 km	MPC · JPL
144754	2004 HH_{2}	—	April 16, 2004	Kitt Peak	Spacewatch	·	1.8 km	MPC · JPL
144755	2004 HO_{3}	—	April 16, 2004	Siding Spring	SSS	·	7.2 km	MPC · JPL
144756	2004 HX_{4}	—	April 16, 2004	Palomar	NEAT	·	2.1 km	MPC · JPL
144757	2004 HJ_{5}	—	April 17, 2004	Socorro	LINEAR	·	2.1 km	MPC · JPL
144758	2004 HR_{7}	—	April 19, 2004	Socorro	LINEAR	·	3.2 km	MPC · JPL
144759	2004 HH_{9}	—	April 17, 2004	Socorro	LINEAR	·	2.3 km	MPC · JPL
144760	2004 HQ_{9}	—	April 17, 2004	Socorro	LINEAR	·	3.8 km	MPC · JPL
144761	2004 HX_{9}	—	April 17, 2004	Socorro	LINEAR	·	2.4 km	MPC · JPL
144762	2004 HR_{10}	—	April 17, 2004	Socorro	LINEAR	·	4.0 km	MPC · JPL
144763	2004 HU_{11}	—	April 19, 2004	Socorro	LINEAR	·	4.5 km	MPC · JPL
144764	2004 HB_{16}	—	April 16, 2004	Socorro	LINEAR	NAE	5.9 km	MPC · JPL
144765	2004 HH_{17}	—	April 16, 2004	Socorro	LINEAR	·	2.5 km	MPC · JPL
144766	2004 HS_{17}	—	April 17, 2004	Socorro	LINEAR	EOS	3.4 km	MPC · JPL
144767	2004 HR_{19}	—	April 20, 2004	Kitt Peak	Spacewatch	·	3.3 km	MPC · JPL
144768	2004 HB_{20}	—	April 20, 2004	Kitt Peak	Spacewatch	MAR	2.7 km	MPC · JPL
144769 Zachariassen	2004 HO_{20}	Zachariassen	April 19, 2004	Jarnac	Glinos, T., D. H. Levy	·	3.7 km	MPC · JPL
144770	2004 HM_{22}	—	April 16, 2004	Kitt Peak	Spacewatch	KOR	2.1 km	MPC · JPL
144771	2004 HQ_{22}	—	April 16, 2004	Kitt Peak	Spacewatch	AGN	1.7 km	MPC · JPL
144772	2004 HB_{25}	—	April 19, 2004	Socorro	LINEAR	·	4.6 km	MPC · JPL
144773	2004 HG_{25}	—	April 19, 2004	Socorro	LINEAR	·	2.8 km	MPC · JPL
144774	2004 HQ_{25}	—	April 19, 2004	Socorro	LINEAR	·	2.2 km	MPC · JPL
144775	2004 HT_{25}	—	April 19, 2004	Socorro	LINEAR	·	4.8 km	MPC · JPL
144776	2004 HN_{26}	—	April 20, 2004	Socorro	LINEAR	·	3.8 km	MPC · JPL
144777	2004 HR_{27}	—	April 20, 2004	Socorro	LINEAR	·	3.9 km	MPC · JPL
144778	2004 HA_{28}	—	April 20, 2004	Socorro	LINEAR	·	5.8 km	MPC · JPL
144779	2004 HV_{28}	—	April 20, 2004	Socorro	LINEAR	·	2.9 km	MPC · JPL
144780	2004 HJ_{29}	—	April 21, 2004	Kitt Peak	Spacewatch	·	4.1 km	MPC · JPL
144781	2004 HZ_{29}	—	April 21, 2004	Socorro	LINEAR	·	1.6 km	MPC · JPL
144782	2004 HH_{30}	—	April 21, 2004	Socorro	LINEAR	·	4.5 km	MPC · JPL
144783	2004 HO_{30}	—	April 21, 2004	Socorro	LINEAR	·	3.7 km	MPC · JPL
144784	2004 HR_{30}	—	April 21, 2004	Socorro	LINEAR	·	2.6 km	MPC · JPL
144785	2004 HC_{31}	—	April 22, 2004	Reedy Creek	J. Broughton	·	3.5 km	MPC · JPL
144786	2004 HT_{35}	—	April 20, 2004	Socorro	LINEAR	·	3.2 km	MPC · JPL
144787	2004 HQ_{38}	—	April 23, 2004	Catalina	CSS	·	4.3 km	MPC · JPL
144788	2004 HX_{42}	—	April 20, 2004	Socorro	LINEAR	EOS	2.9 km	MPC · JPL
144789	2004 HF_{43}	—	April 20, 2004	Socorro	LINEAR	WIT	1.5 km	MPC · JPL
144790	2004 HT_{43}	—	April 21, 2004	Socorro	LINEAR	·	5.4 km	MPC · JPL
144791	2004 HY_{43}	—	April 21, 2004	Socorro	LINEAR	·	1.8 km	MPC · JPL
144792	2004 HD_{46}	—	April 21, 2004	Siding Spring	SSS	EUP	7.3 km	MPC · JPL
144793	2004 HD_{47}	—	April 22, 2004	Catalina	CSS	·	3.0 km	MPC · JPL
144794	2004 HF_{47}	—	April 22, 2004	Catalina	CSS	EOS	3.6 km	MPC · JPL
144795	2004 HV_{47}	—	April 22, 2004	Siding Spring	SSS	·	5.4 km	MPC · JPL
144796	2004 HV_{48}	—	April 22, 2004	Siding Spring	SSS	·	3.3 km	MPC · JPL
144797	2004 HM_{49}	—	April 23, 2004	Kitt Peak	Spacewatch	(45637) · CYB	6.4 km	MPC · JPL
144798	2004 HX_{50}	—	April 23, 2004	Siding Spring	SSS	·	3.6 km	MPC · JPL
144799	2004 HX_{54}	—	April 21, 2004	Socorro	LINEAR	EUN	2.4 km	MPC · JPL
144800	2004 HC_{55}	—	April 23, 2004	Socorro	LINEAR	·	4.5 km	MPC · JPL

== 144801–144900 ==
back to top

Designation			Discovery			Properties		Ref
Permanent	Provisional	Named after	Date	Site	Discoverer(s)	Category	Diam.	Ref
144801	2004 HF_{55}	—	April 23, 2004	Catalina	CSS	·	1.9 km	MPC · JPL
144802	2004 HH_{55}	—	April 23, 2004	Catalina	CSS	·	7.1 km	MPC · JPL
144803	2004 HL_{56}	—	April 25, 2004	Anderson Mesa	LONEOS	·	8.7 km	MPC · JPL
144804	2004 HU_{58}	—	April 24, 2004	Kitt Peak	Spacewatch	·	2.6 km	MPC · JPL
144805	2004 HD_{59}	—	April 24, 2004	Kitt Peak	Spacewatch	·	6.9 km	MPC · JPL
144806	2004 HC_{61}	—	April 25, 2004	Socorro	LINEAR	·	5.5 km	MPC · JPL
144807	2004 HV_{63}	—	April 16, 2004	Palomar	NEAT	·	2.3 km	MPC · JPL
144808	2004 HD_{64}	—	April 25, 2004	Haleakala	NEAT	·	4.4 km	MPC · JPL
144809	2004 HV_{72}	—	April 28, 2004	Kitt Peak	Spacewatch	·	4.1 km	MPC · JPL
144810	2004 HE_{74}	—	April 28, 2004	Kitt Peak	Spacewatch	·	5.6 km	MPC · JPL
144811	2004 HK_{74}	—	April 29, 2004	Haleakala	NEAT	·	2.8 km	MPC · JPL
144812	2004 JX	—	May 10, 2004	Desert Eagle	W. K. Y. Yeung	·	4.4 km	MPC · JPL
144813	2004 JU_{1}	—	May 10, 2004	Reedy Creek	J. Broughton	·	4.8 km	MPC · JPL
144814	2004 JL_{2}	—	May 12, 2004	Desert Eagle	W. K. Y. Yeung	·	4.2 km	MPC · JPL
144815	2004 JP_{2}	—	May 8, 2004	Palomar	NEAT	·	2.8 km	MPC · JPL
144816	2004 JL_{4}	—	May 10, 2004	Catalina	CSS	·	4.0 km	MPC · JPL
144817	2004 JB_{5}	—	May 12, 2004	Reedy Creek	J. Broughton	·	4.2 km	MPC · JPL
144818	2004 JD_{5}	—	May 12, 2004	Reedy Creek	J. Broughton	VER	4.8 km	MPC · JPL
144819	2004 JS_{5}	—	May 12, 2004	Palomar	NEAT	EOS	4.0 km	MPC · JPL
144820	2004 JW_{5}	—	May 10, 2004	Palomar	NEAT	·	4.5 km	MPC · JPL
144821	2004 JB_{6}	—	May 12, 2004	Socorro	LINEAR	PHO	4.6 km	MPC · JPL
144822	2004 JF_{12}	—	May 13, 2004	Palomar	NEAT	·	5.8 km	MPC · JPL
144823	2004 JU_{13}	—	May 9, 2004	Kitt Peak	Spacewatch	THM	3.7 km	MPC · JPL
144824	2004 JZ_{13}	—	May 9, 2004	Palomar	NEAT	EOS	3.7 km	MPC · JPL
144825	2004 JB_{15}	—	May 9, 2004	Haleakala	NEAT	·	5.0 km	MPC · JPL
144826	2004 JP_{15}	—	May 10, 2004	Palomar	NEAT	·	2.5 km	MPC · JPL
144827	2004 JF_{16}	—	May 11, 2004	Anderson Mesa	LONEOS	·	3.0 km	MPC · JPL
144828	2004 JL_{16}	—	May 11, 2004	Anderson Mesa	LONEOS	DOR	3.9 km	MPC · JPL
144829	2004 JV_{16}	—	May 11, 2004	Anderson Mesa	LONEOS	·	1.8 km	MPC · JPL
144830	2004 JQ_{17}	—	May 12, 2004	Siding Spring	SSS	·	4.2 km	MPC · JPL
144831	2004 JN_{21}	—	May 9, 2004	Kitt Peak	Spacewatch	·	3.1 km	MPC · JPL
144832	2004 JE_{23}	—	May 13, 2004	Kitt Peak	Spacewatch	·	5.2 km	MPC · JPL
144833	2004 JM_{24}	—	May 15, 2004	Socorro	LINEAR	·	3.3 km	MPC · JPL
144834	2004 JR_{24}	—	May 15, 2004	Socorro	LINEAR	ADE	4.7 km	MPC · JPL
144835	2004 JC_{26}	—	May 15, 2004	Socorro	LINEAR	·	3.9 km	MPC · JPL
144836	2004 JR_{28}	—	May 13, 2004	Kitt Peak	Spacewatch	·	5.2 km	MPC · JPL
144837	2004 JG_{29}	—	May 15, 2004	Socorro	LINEAR	·	4.6 km	MPC · JPL
144838	2004 JM_{30}	—	May 15, 2004	Socorro	LINEAR	NYS	2.3 km	MPC · JPL
144839	2004 JJ_{31}	—	May 15, 2004	Socorro	LINEAR	·	3.3 km	MPC · JPL
144840	2004 JX_{35}	—	May 13, 2004	Palomar	NEAT	L4	12 km	MPC · JPL
144841	2004 JB_{37}	—	May 13, 2004	Kitt Peak	Spacewatch	·	5.7 km	MPC · JPL
144842	2004 JF_{37}	—	May 13, 2004	Palomar	NEAT	·	7.0 km	MPC · JPL
144843	2004 JH_{38}	—	May 14, 2004	Kitt Peak	Spacewatch	·	2.6 km	MPC · JPL
144844	2004 JD_{41}	—	May 15, 2004	Socorro	LINEAR	·	1.7 km	MPC · JPL
144845	2004 JM_{42}	—	May 15, 2004	Socorro	LINEAR	THM	3.1 km	MPC · JPL
144846	2004 JW_{46}	—	May 13, 2004	Kitt Peak	Spacewatch	KOR	1.7 km	MPC · JPL
144847	2004 JP_{49}	—	May 13, 2004	Kitt Peak	Spacewatch	HYG	3.2 km	MPC · JPL
144848	2004 KB_{3}	—	May 16, 2004	Kitt Peak	Spacewatch	EOS	2.8 km	MPC · JPL
144849	2004 KG_{3}	—	May 16, 2004	Socorro	LINEAR	EOS	3.5 km	MPC · JPL
144850	2004 KY_{5}	—	May 17, 2004	Socorro	LINEAR	·	2.5 km	MPC · JPL
144851	2004 KK_{7}	—	May 20, 2004	Needville	W. G. Dillon, D. Wells	3:2	8.5 km	MPC · JPL
144852	2004 KU_{7}	—	May 17, 2004	Socorro	LINEAR	EOS	4.5 km	MPC · JPL
144853	2004 KW_{8}	—	May 18, 2004	Socorro	LINEAR	·	3.2 km	MPC · JPL
144854	2004 KA_{10}	—	May 19, 2004	Socorro	LINEAR	fast	4.3 km	MPC · JPL
144855	2004 KF_{10}	—	May 19, 2004	Siding Spring	SSS	·	4.1 km	MPC · JPL
144856	2004 KH_{10}	—	May 20, 2004	Kitt Peak	Spacewatch	·	2.4 km	MPC · JPL
144857	2004 LT_{7}	—	June 11, 2004	Socorro	LINEAR	·	2.6 km	MPC · JPL
144858	2004 LT_{9}	—	June 13, 2004	Socorro	LINEAR	·	4.1 km	MPC · JPL
144859	2004 LG_{10}	—	June 8, 2004	Kitt Peak	Spacewatch	MAS	1.2 km	MPC · JPL
144860	2004 LJ_{11}	—	June 11, 2004	Kitt Peak	Spacewatch	·	2.3 km	MPC · JPL
144861	2004 LA_{12}	—	June 14, 2004	Palomar	NEAT	T_{j} (2.78) · APO +1km	3.0 km	MPC · JPL
144862	2004 LK_{13}	—	June 11, 2004	Socorro	LINEAR	·	6.6 km	MPC · JPL
144863	2004 LW_{13}	—	June 11, 2004	Socorro	LINEAR	EOS	3.2 km	MPC · JPL
144864	2004 LC_{15}	—	June 11, 2004	Socorro	LINEAR	·	4.4 km	MPC · JPL
144865	2004 LD_{15}	—	June 11, 2004	Socorro	LINEAR	URS	4.3 km	MPC · JPL
144866	2004 LX_{16}	—	June 14, 2004	Socorro	LINEAR	T_{j} (2.95)	7.8 km	MPC · JPL
144867	2004 LA_{17}	—	June 14, 2004	Socorro	LINEAR	·	2.2 km	MPC · JPL
144868	2004 LW_{29}	—	June 14, 2004	Kitt Peak	Spacewatch	EOS	3.4 km	MPC · JPL
144869	2004 MQ	—	June 16, 2004	Socorro	LINEAR	·	2.6 km	MPC · JPL
144870	2004 MA_{8}	—	June 29, 2004	Siding Spring	SSS	T_{j} (2.88)	7.2 km	MPC · JPL
144871	2004 NN_{1}	—	July 9, 2004	Socorro	LINEAR	·	3.7 km	MPC · JPL
144872	2004 NN_{12}	—	July 11, 2004	Socorro	LINEAR	EOS	3.3 km	MPC · JPL
144873	2004 NT_{19}	—	July 14, 2004	Socorro	LINEAR	·	4.3 km	MPC · JPL
144874	2004 NV_{30}	—	July 9, 2004	Anderson Mesa	LONEOS	MAS	1.5 km	MPC · JPL
144875	2004 OX	—	July 16, 2004	Reedy Creek	J. Broughton	·	2.0 km	MPC · JPL
144876	2004 OB_{1}	—	July 16, 2004	Socorro	LINEAR	·	3.5 km	MPC · JPL
144877	2004 OS_{5}	—	July 17, 2004	Socorro	LINEAR	EOS ·	3.7 km	MPC · JPL
144878	2004 RO_{13}	—	September 6, 2004	Goodricke-Pigott	Goodricke-Pigott	·	5.6 km	MPC · JPL
144879	2004 RS_{39}	—	September 7, 2004	Kitt Peak	Spacewatch	·	3.9 km	MPC · JPL
144880	2004 RU_{56}	—	September 8, 2004	Socorro	LINEAR	HYG	5.3 km	MPC · JPL
144881	2004 RM_{99}	—	September 8, 2004	Socorro	LINEAR	slow	6.1 km	MPC · JPL
144882	2004 RP_{106}	—	September 8, 2004	Palomar	NEAT	·	3.7 km	MPC · JPL
144883	2004 RM_{110}	—	September 11, 2004	Socorro	LINEAR	H	840 m	MPC · JPL
144884	2004 RQ_{113}	—	September 7, 2004	Socorro	LINEAR	·	4.3 km	MPC · JPL
144885	2004 RH_{116}	—	September 7, 2004	Socorro	LINEAR	(45637) · CYB	6.8 km	MPC · JPL
144886	2004 RJ_{141}	—	September 8, 2004	Socorro	LINEAR	KOR	2.4 km	MPC · JPL
144887	2004 RD_{165}	—	September 9, 2004	Uccle	P. De Cat, E. W. Elst	·	4.8 km	MPC · JPL
144888	2004 RZ_{192}	—	September 10, 2004	Socorro	LINEAR	·	6.3 km	MPC · JPL
144889	2004 RZ_{213}	—	September 11, 2004	Socorro	LINEAR	·	7.2 km	MPC · JPL
144890	2004 RG_{288}	—	September 15, 2004	7300 Observatory	W. K. Y. Yeung	(5)	2.3 km	MPC · JPL
144891	2004 RC_{289}	—	September 14, 2004	Socorro	LINEAR	H	910 m	MPC · JPL
144892	2004 SJ_{3}	—	September 17, 2004	Kitt Peak	Spacewatch	·	3.4 km	MPC · JPL
144893	2004 ST_{4}	—	September 17, 2004	Socorro	LINEAR	·	1.2 km	MPC · JPL
144894	2004 SY_{5}	—	September 17, 2004	Kitt Peak	Spacewatch	3:2	9.8 km	MPC · JPL
144895	2004 TO_{65}	—	October 5, 2004	Palomar	NEAT	GEF	2.0 km	MPC · JPL
144896	2004 TT_{308}	—	October 10, 2004	Kitt Peak	Spacewatch	·	1.1 km	MPC · JPL
144897	2004 UX_{10}	—	October 20, 2004	Apache Point	A. C. Becker, Puckett, A. W., Kubica, J.	other TNO	398 km	MPC · JPL
144898	2004 VD_{17}	—	November 7, 2004	Socorro	LINEAR	APO · PHA	590 m	MPC · JPL
144899	2004 VX_{34}	—	November 3, 2004	Kitt Peak	Spacewatch	·	4.0 km	MPC · JPL
144900	2004 VG_{64}	—	November 13, 2004	Catalina	CSS	ATE +1km · PHA	790 m	MPC · JPL

== 144901–145000 ==
back to top

Designation			Discovery			Properties		Ref
Permanent	Provisional	Named after	Date	Site	Discoverer(s)	Category	Diam.	Ref
144901	2004 WG_{1}	—	November 19, 2004	Socorro	LINEAR	APO +1km	2.2 km	MPC · JPL
144902	2004 XO_{12}	—	December 8, 2004	Socorro	LINEAR	V	1.1 km	MPC · JPL
144903	2004 XD_{22}	—	December 8, 2004	Socorro	LINEAR	·	5.1 km	MPC · JPL
144904	2004 XD_{26}	—	December 9, 2004	Kitt Peak	Spacewatch	NEM	3.3 km	MPC · JPL
144905	2004 XY_{27}	—	December 10, 2004	Socorro	LINEAR	·	4.1 km	MPC · JPL
144906	2004 XE_{128}	—	December 14, 2004	Socorro	LINEAR	·	2.0 km	MPC · JPL
144907 Whitehorne	2004 YS_{3}	Whitehorne	December 16, 2004	Jarnac	Glinos, T., D. H. Levy, Levy, W.	·	2.9 km	MPC · JPL
144908	2004 YH_{32}	—	December 18, 2004	Siding Spring	SSS	T_{j} (1.03) · damocloid · critical · unusual	10 km	MPC · JPL
144909	2004 YO_{33}	—	December 16, 2004	Socorro	LINEAR	·	3.5 km	MPC · JPL
144910	2005 AX_{15}	—	January 6, 2005	Socorro	LINEAR	KOR	2.5 km	MPC · JPL
144911	2005 AS_{27}	—	January 15, 2005	Socorro	LINEAR	H	1.3 km	MPC · JPL
144912	2005 AY_{32}	—	January 11, 2005	Socorro	LINEAR	·	4.3 km	MPC · JPL
144913	2005 AB_{39}	—	January 13, 2005	Kitt Peak	Spacewatch	·	3.1 km	MPC · JPL
144914	2005 AK_{40}	—	January 15, 2005	Socorro	LINEAR	KOR	2.1 km	MPC · JPL
144915	2005 AQ_{45}	—	January 7, 2005	Catalina	CSS	PHO	2.2 km	MPC · JPL
144916	2005 AY_{69}	—	January 15, 2005	Kitt Peak	Spacewatch	·	4.1 km	MPC · JPL
144917	2005 BJ_{6}	—	January 16, 2005	Socorro	LINEAR	·	1.3 km	MPC · JPL
144918	2005 BV_{26}	—	January 19, 2005	Kitt Peak	Spacewatch	·	1.3 km	MPC · JPL
144919	2005 BA_{27}	—	January 16, 2005	Socorro	LINEAR	H	1.5 km	MPC · JPL
144920	2005 BN_{29}	—	January 17, 2005	Catalina	CSS	H	940 m	MPC · JPL
144921	2005 CE_{25}	—	February 4, 2005	Palomar	NEAT	·	1.5 km	MPC · JPL
144922	2005 CK_{38}	—	February 3, 2005	Socorro	LINEAR	AMO +1km	1.2 km	MPC · JPL
144923	2005 CQ_{43}	—	February 2, 2005	Catalina	CSS	·	1.8 km	MPC · JPL
144924	2005 CX_{48}	—	February 2, 2005	Socorro	LINEAR	·	7.9 km	MPC · JPL
144925	2005 CO_{50}	—	February 2, 2005	Socorro	LINEAR	(2076)	1.3 km	MPC · JPL
144926	2005 CL_{51}	—	February 2, 2005	Kitt Peak	Spacewatch	·	1.4 km	MPC · JPL
144927	2005 CF_{52}	—	February 2, 2005	Kitt Peak	Spacewatch	·	1.3 km	MPC · JPL
144928	2005 CH_{52}	—	February 2, 2005	Kitt Peak	Spacewatch	·	1.5 km	MPC · JPL
144929	2005 CP_{61}	—	February 9, 2005	Anderson Mesa	LONEOS	H	1.0 km	MPC · JPL
144930	2005 CZ_{67}	—	February 2, 2005	Socorro	LINEAR	MAS	1.4 km	MPC · JPL
144931	2005 ED_{2}	—	March 2, 2005	Catalina	CSS	H	1.1 km	MPC · JPL
144932	2005 EQ_{7}	—	March 1, 2005	Kitt Peak	Spacewatch	NYS	1.7 km	MPC · JPL
144933	2005 EA_{8}	—	March 1, 2005	Kitt Peak	Spacewatch	·	1.3 km	MPC · JPL
144934	2005 EZ_{9}	—	March 2, 2005	Kitt Peak	Spacewatch	MAS	1.1 km	MPC · JPL
144935	2005 ES_{10}	—	March 2, 2005	Kitt Peak	Spacewatch	V	1.1 km	MPC · JPL
144936	2005 EQ_{13}	—	March 3, 2005	Kitt Peak	Spacewatch	NYS	1.4 km	MPC · JPL
144937	2005 EP_{15}	—	March 3, 2005	Kitt Peak	Spacewatch	·	1.8 km	MPC · JPL
144938	2005 EC_{16}	—	March 3, 2005	Kitt Peak	Spacewatch	·	1.9 km	MPC · JPL
144939	2005 EJ_{16}	—	March 3, 2005	Kitt Peak	Spacewatch	·	1.1 km	MPC · JPL
144940	2005 EO_{19}	—	March 3, 2005	Kitt Peak	Spacewatch	·	2.6 km	MPC · JPL
144941	2005 EW_{23}	—	March 3, 2005	Catalina	CSS	·	2.4 km	MPC · JPL
144942	2005 EB_{24}	—	March 3, 2005	Goodricke-Pigott	R. A. Tucker	·	1.4 km	MPC · JPL
144943	2005 EG_{24}	—	March 3, 2005	Catalina	CSS	·	3.9 km	MPC · JPL
144944	2005 EY_{26}	—	March 3, 2005	Catalina	CSS	·	1.7 km	MPC · JPL
144945	2005 EC_{29}	—	March 3, 2005	Catalina	CSS	H	940 m	MPC · JPL
144946	2005 EJ_{31}	—	March 1, 2005	Kitt Peak	Spacewatch	·	2.4 km	MPC · JPL
144947	2005 ES_{31}	—	March 3, 2005	Kitt Peak	Spacewatch	TIR	3.0 km	MPC · JPL
144948	2005 EB_{32}	—	March 3, 2005	Catalina	CSS	(18466)	1.9 km	MPC · JPL
144949	2005 EG_{35}	—	March 3, 2005	Kitt Peak	Spacewatch	NYS	1.6 km	MPC · JPL
144950	2005 EQ_{35}	—	March 4, 2005	Catalina	CSS	V	990 m	MPC · JPL
144951	2005 EE_{37}	—	March 4, 2005	Catalina	CSS	PHO	2.2 km	MPC · JPL
144952	2005 EC_{38}	—	March 4, 2005	Kitt Peak	Spacewatch	·	1.5 km	MPC · JPL
144953	2005 ER_{41}	—	March 1, 2005	Kitt Peak	Spacewatch	V	1.2 km	MPC · JPL
144954	2005 EH_{44}	—	March 3, 2005	Kitt Peak	Spacewatch	NYS	2.1 km	MPC · JPL
144955	2005 ER_{45}	—	March 3, 2005	Kitt Peak	Spacewatch	·	4.8 km	MPC · JPL
144956	2005 EM_{47}	—	March 3, 2005	Kitt Peak	Spacewatch	·	1.8 km	MPC · JPL
144957	2005 EW_{47}	—	March 3, 2005	Catalina	CSS	·	1.5 km	MPC · JPL
144958	2005 EV_{50}	—	March 3, 2005	Catalina	CSS	V	1.1 km	MPC · JPL
144959	2005 EX_{58}	—	March 4, 2005	Kitt Peak	Spacewatch	NYS	1.3 km	MPC · JPL
144960	2005 EN_{77}	—	March 3, 2005	Catalina	CSS	·	1.5 km	MPC · JPL
144961	2005 EP_{77}	—	March 3, 2005	Catalina	CSS	V	980 m	MPC · JPL
144962	2005 EZ_{77}	—	March 3, 2005	Catalina	CSS	NYS	2.0 km	MPC · JPL
144963	2005 EZ_{79}	—	March 3, 2005	Socorro	LINEAR	·	2.1 km	MPC · JPL
144964	2005 EC_{80}	—	March 3, 2005	Catalina	CSS	V	1.0 km	MPC · JPL
144965	2005 EA_{86}	—	March 4, 2005	Socorro	LINEAR	NYS	2.0 km	MPC · JPL
144966	2005 EA_{90}	—	March 8, 2005	Anderson Mesa	LONEOS	·	2.3 km	MPC · JPL
144967	2005 EX_{92}	—	March 8, 2005	Socorro	LINEAR	V	1.9 km	MPC · JPL
144968	2005 EY_{93}	—	March 8, 2005	Socorro	LINEAR	EUP	6.9 km	MPC · JPL
144969	2005 EH_{95}	—	March 1, 2005	Catalina	CSS	H	1.1 km	MPC · JPL
144970	2005 EE_{101}	—	March 3, 2005	Catalina	CSS	·	2.2 km	MPC · JPL
144971	2005 EY_{108}	—	March 4, 2005	Catalina	CSS	·	1.5 km	MPC · JPL
144972	2005 EM_{119}	—	March 7, 2005	Goodricke-Pigott	R. A. Tucker	·	1.4 km	MPC · JPL
144973	2005 EP_{124}	—	March 8, 2005	Anderson Mesa	LONEOS	·	1.3 km	MPC · JPL
144974	2005 EH_{125}	—	March 8, 2005	Mount Lemmon	Mount Lemmon Survey	slow	1.2 km	MPC · JPL
144975	2005 EB_{126}	—	March 8, 2005	Mount Lemmon	Mount Lemmon Survey	NYS	2.2 km	MPC · JPL
144976	2005 EV_{126}	—	March 8, 2005	Mount Lemmon	Mount Lemmon Survey	·	1.4 km	MPC · JPL
144977	2005 EC_{127}	—	March 9, 2005	Kitt Peak	Spacewatch	fast	1.0 km	MPC · JPL
144978	2005 EY_{131}	—	March 9, 2005	Catalina	CSS	H	1.1 km	MPC · JPL
144979	2005 EE_{137}	—	March 9, 2005	Mount Lemmon	Mount Lemmon Survey	·	2.4 km	MPC · JPL
144980	2005 EK_{139}	—	March 9, 2005	Mount Lemmon	Mount Lemmon Survey	MIS	3.8 km	MPC · JPL
144981	2005 EM_{142}	—	March 10, 2005	Catalina	CSS	·	1.2 km	MPC · JPL
144982	2005 EZ_{142}	—	March 10, 2005	Catalina	CSS	·	1.9 km	MPC · JPL
144983	2005 EM_{148}	—	March 10, 2005	Kitt Peak	Spacewatch	·	1.5 km	MPC · JPL
144984	2005 EK_{150}	—	March 10, 2005	Kitt Peak	Spacewatch	·	1.0 km	MPC · JPL
144985	2005 EE_{152}	—	March 10, 2005	Kitt Peak	Spacewatch	·	1.8 km	MPC · JPL
144986	2005 ET_{154}	—	March 8, 2005	Mount Lemmon	Mount Lemmon Survey	NYS	1.6 km	MPC · JPL
144987	2005 EQ_{155}	—	March 8, 2005	Mount Lemmon	Mount Lemmon Survey	·	1.1 km	MPC · JPL
144988	2005 EC_{164}	—	March 10, 2005	Mount Lemmon	Mount Lemmon Survey	NYS	1.8 km	MPC · JPL
144989	2005 EV_{171}	—	March 7, 2005	Socorro	LINEAR	·	1.9 km	MPC · JPL
144990	2005 ES_{179}	—	March 9, 2005	Kitt Peak	Spacewatch	·	1.3 km	MPC · JPL
144991	2005 EH_{182}	—	March 9, 2005	Anderson Mesa	LONEOS	·	4.9 km	MPC · JPL
144992	2005 EM_{182}	—	March 9, 2005	Anderson Mesa	LONEOS	·	1.1 km	MPC · JPL
144993	2005 EH_{185}	—	March 9, 2005	Siding Spring	SSS	·	2.0 km	MPC · JPL
144994	2005 EO_{186}	—	March 10, 2005	Catalina	CSS	·	1.5 km	MPC · JPL
144995	2005 EA_{187}	—	March 10, 2005	Mount Lemmon	Mount Lemmon Survey	·	1.7 km	MPC · JPL
144996	2005 EA_{188}	—	March 10, 2005	Mount Lemmon	Mount Lemmon Survey	·	990 m	MPC · JPL
144997	2005 EH_{196}	—	March 11, 2005	Mount Lemmon	Mount Lemmon Survey	·	1.4 km	MPC · JPL
144998	2005 EY_{198}	—	March 11, 2005	Mount Lemmon	Mount Lemmon Survey	·	1.1 km	MPC · JPL
144999	2005 EJ_{199}	—	March 11, 2005	Kitt Peak	Spacewatch	·	4.2 km	MPC · JPL
145000	2005 EH_{200}	—	March 12, 2005	Anderson Mesa	LONEOS	·	1.6 km	MPC · JPL

back to top

== See also ==
- Meanings of minor-planet names: 144001–145000
