= Meanings of minor-planet names: 144001–145000 =

As minor planet discoveries are confirmed, they are given a permanent number by the IAU's Minor Planet Center (MPC), and the discoverers can then submit names for them, following the IAU's naming conventions. The list below concerns those minor planets in the specified number-range that have received names, and explains the meanings of those names.

Official naming citations of newly named small Solar System bodies are approved and published in a bulletin by IAU's Working Group for Small Bodies Nomenclature (WGSBN). Before May 2021, citations were published in MPC's Minor Planet Circulars for many decades. Recent citations can also be found on the JPL Small-Body Database (SBDB). Until his death in 2016, German astronomer Lutz D. Schmadel compiled these citations into the Dictionary of Minor Planet Names (DMP) and regularly updated the collection.

Based on Paul Herget's The Names of the Minor Planets, Schmadel also researched the unclear origin of numerous asteroids, most of which had been named prior to World War II. This article incorporates text from this source, which is in the public domain: SBDB New namings may only be added to this list below after official publication as the preannouncement of names is condemned. The WGSBN publishes a comprehensive guideline for the naming rules of non-cometary small Solar System bodies.

== 144001–144100 ==
| Named minor planet | Provisional | This minor planet was named for... | Ref · Catalog |
|---|---|---|---|
| 144096 Wiesendangen | 2004 BV_{58} | Wiesendangen, Switzerland, home of the discoverer Markus Griesser and his family | JPL · 144096 |

== 144101–144200 ==
back to top

| Named minor planet | Provisional | This minor planet was named for... | Ref · Catalog |
|---|---|---|---|
There are no named minor planets in this number range

== 144201–144300 ==
back to top

| Named minor planet | Provisional | This minor planet was named for... | Ref · Catalog |
|---|---|---|---|
| 144296 Steviewonder | 2004 DF | Stevie Wonder (born 1950) is the stage name of Stevland Hardaway Morris. He is a blind American songwriter, singer and multi-instrumentalist. He has recorded more than 30 U.S. top ten hits and received 25 Grammy Awards. | JPL · 144296 |

== 144301–144400 ==
back to top

| Named minor planet | Provisional | This minor planet was named for... | Ref · Catalog |
|---|---|---|---|
| 144303 Mirellabreschi | 2004 DD_{7} | Mirella Breschi (born 1940), wife of the Italian amateur astronomer Giancarlo Fagioli who co-discovered this minor planet | JPL · 144303 |
| 144333 Marcinkiewicz | 2004 DT_{25} | Ekhard Marcinkiewicz (born 1928), Austrian amateur solar astronomer (Src) | JPL · 144333 |
| 144362 Swantner | 2004 DG_{45} | William H. Swantner (born 1943), an American optical engineer, instrumental for the construction of the imaging system used at the Jornada Observatory in Las Cruces, New Mexico, where this minor planet was discovered. | IAU · 144362 |
| 144386 Emmabirath | 2004 DB_{71} | Emma M. Birath (born 1974) is a data analyst at Southwest Research Institute Boulder, Colorado. She built instrument software sequences for the New Horizons Mission to Pluto. | JPL · 144386 |

== 144401–144500 ==
back to top

| Named minor planet | Provisional | This minor planet was named for... | Ref · Catalog |
|---|---|---|---|
| 144496 Reingard | 2004 EZ_{66} | Reingard Apitzsch (born 1947), wife of the German discoverer Rolf Apitzsch | JPL · 144496 |

== 144501–144600 ==
back to top

| Named minor planet | Provisional | This minor planet was named for... | Ref · Catalog |
|---|---|---|---|
| 144552 Jackiesue | 2004 FS_{4} | Jackie Sue Holmes (born 1959), wife of American amateur astronomer Robert Holmes who discovered this minor planet. She is active in the business component of the Astronomical Research Institute (H21) in Illinois. | JPL · 144552 |

== 144601–144700 ==
back to top

| Named minor planet | Provisional | This minor planet was named for... | Ref · Catalog |
|---|---|---|---|
| 144633 Georgecarroll | 2004 FH_{80} | George Carroll (1902–1983), American builder of precision instruments, heliostats, and telescopes. This minor planet was discovered using one of his telescopes at the Stony Ridge Observatory, California. | JPL · 144633 |
| 144692 Katemary | 2004 GC | Katelyn Anne Marie Young (born 1999), granddaughter of the American astronomer James Whitney Young who discovered this minor planet | JPL · 144692 |

== 144701–144800 ==
back to top

| Named minor planet | Provisional | This minor planet was named for... | Ref · Catalog |
|---|---|---|---|
| 144716 Scotttucker | 2004 GW_{28} | Scott Robert Tucker (born 1978) is a Tucson-based, self-trained optical designer and fabricator of telescopes and astronomical instruments. He is also an experienced astrophotographer and astronomy communicator. | JPL · 144716 |
| 144752 Plungė | 2004 HK | The Lithuanian town of Plungė, native town of Elena Petreikytė-Černienė, a former teacher of astronomy and wife of astronomer Kazimieras Černis who co-discovered this minor planet | JPL · 144752 |
| 144769 Zachariassen | 2004 HO_{20} | Rayan Zachariassen (born 1963), a Canadian computer scientist | JPL · 144769 |

== 144801–144900 ==
back to top

| Named minor planet | Provisional | This minor planet was named for... | Ref · Catalog |
|---|---|---|---|
There are no named minor planets in this number range

== 144901–145000 ==
back to top

| Named minor planet | Provisional | This minor planet was named for... | Ref · Catalog |
|---|---|---|---|
| 144907 Whitehorne | 2004 YS_{3} | Mary Lou Whitehorne, Canadian second vice-president of the Royal Astronomical Society of Canada (Src) | JPL · 144907 |

back to top

| Preceded by 143,001–144,000 | Meanings of minor-planet names List of minor planets: 144,001–145,000 | Succeeded by 145,001–146,000 |
