= Stony Ridge Observatory =

Observatory in California, US

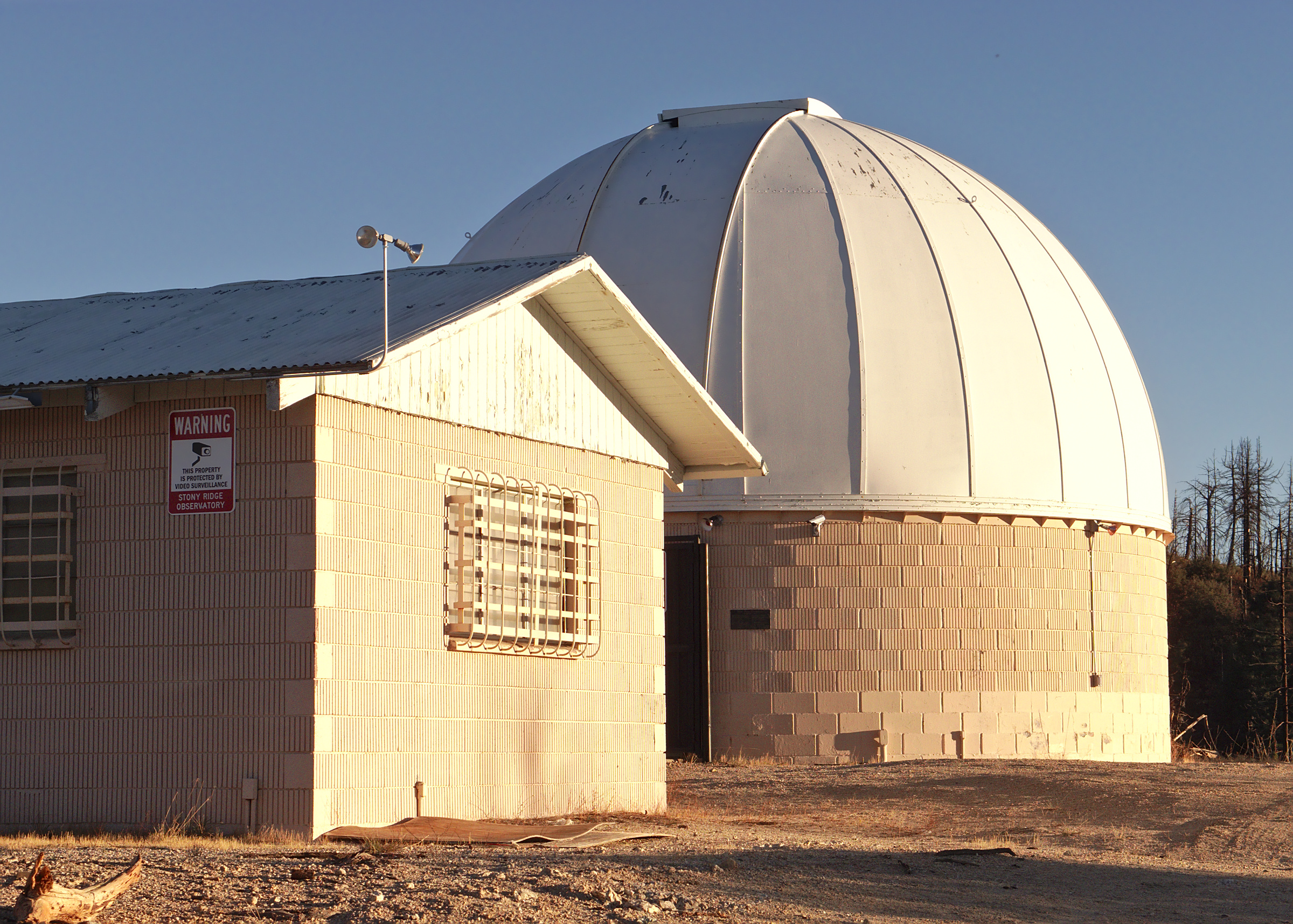
- Site in 2014
- Organization: Stony Ridge Observatory, Inc.
- Observatory code: 671
- Location: Angeles National Forest; Los Angeles Co., CA, USA
- Coordinates: 34°18′5.6″N 117°59′52.4″W
- Altitude: 1,730 m (5,676 ft)
- Established: 1957
- Website: Stony Ridge Observatory

Telescopes
- Newtonian-Cassegrain reflector optical: 760 mm (30 in) f/6

Stony Ridge Observatory is an astronomical observatory built by and for amateur astronomers in the mountains of Los Angeles County, California, in 1957. When installed, its 760 mm (30 in) Newtonian-Cassegrain likely ranked as 8th largest of all telescopes in California, and one of the largest amateur telescopes in the United States. The telescope is designed so that one of four Newtonian foci, or a Cassegrain focus, can be used. Asteroids 10168 Stony Ridge, 144633 Georgecarroll and 327030 Alanmaclure, were discovered at the observatory, and other scientific research (including an extensive lunar photography and mapping project in cooperation with Lockheed upon which the decision on the lunar lander touchdown site was based) has been conducted there. The observatory also has a 12-inch Cassegrain telescope and a number of accessory items, including CCD cameras and computer equipment.

Facilities include an administration building with a small galley and bunkroom, the dome containing the 30-inch telescope, and a vault-style outhouse. The facility has Edison electric power and a landline telephone connection, but water must be carried in. Stony Ridge is located on a remote, restricted-access site north of Mt. Wilson, near Charlton Flat in the Angeles National Forest. In September 2009, Stony Ridge was at risk of being lost to a wildfire but escaped with minimal fire damage to one side of the outhouse building, although nearby ground cover was burned away, and the foliage of surrounding Coulter pines was destroyed.

Recent restoration projects, completed in mid-2017, included: Re-installation of the original, George Carroll-designed right ascension and declination drive systems; installation of a Software Bisque-based "go to" system which will point the telescope at a computer-selected celestial object too faint to be seen with the naked eye or the telelescope's finder scopes; stripping and re-aluminization of the primary and secondary mirrors, which were significantly deteriorated by age, as well as smoke and heat from the infamous Station Fire, which burned more than 200 square miles of the Angeles National Forest surrounding the observatory in 2009.

== See also ==
- List of astronomical observatories
