= List of minor planets: 143001–144000 =

The following is a partial list of minor planets, running from minor-planet number 143001 through 144000, inclusive. The primary data for this and other partial lists is based on JPL's "Small-Body Orbital Elements" and data available from the Minor Planet Center. Critical list information is also provided by the MPC, unless otherwise specified from Lowell Observatory. A detailed description of the table's columns and additional sources are given on the main page including a complete list of every page in this series, and a statistical break-up on the dynamical classification of minor planets.

Also see the summary list of all named bodies in numerical and alphabetical order, and the corresponding naming citations for the number range of this particular list. New namings may only be added to this list after official publication, as the preannouncement of names is condemned by the Working Group for Small Bodies Nomenclature of the International Astronomical Union.

Near-Earth obj.	MBA (inner)	MBA (outer)	Centaur
Mars-crosser	MBA (middle)	Jupiter trojan	Trans-Neptunian obj.
Unclassified

== 143001–143100 ==
Designation			Discovery			Properties		Ref
Permanent	Provisional	Named after	Date	Site	Discoverer(s)	Category	Diam.	Ref
143001	2002 VO_{101}	—	November 11, 2002	Socorro	LINEAR	·	2.4 km	MPC · JPL
143002	2002 VQ_{101}	—	November 11, 2002	Socorro	LINEAR	·	2.4 km	MPC · JPL
143003	2002 VC_{102}	—	November 11, 2002	Socorro	LINEAR	PHO	4.5 km	MPC · JPL
143004	2002 VD_{103}	—	November 12, 2002	Socorro	LINEAR	·	2.8 km	MPC · JPL
143005	2002 VG_{103}	—	November 12, 2002	Socorro	LINEAR	·	2.7 km	MPC · JPL
143006	2002 VK_{103}	—	November 12, 2002	Socorro	LINEAR	·	2.0 km	MPC · JPL
143007	2002 VO_{103}	—	November 12, 2002	Socorro	LINEAR	EUN	2.1 km	MPC · JPL
143008	2002 VQ_{103}	—	November 12, 2002	Socorro	LINEAR	PAD	4.5 km	MPC · JPL
143009	2002 VX_{103}	—	November 12, 2002	Socorro	LINEAR	WIT	2.1 km	MPC · JPL
143010	2002 VB_{104}	—	November 12, 2002	Socorro	LINEAR	·	3.6 km	MPC · JPL
143011	2002 VJ_{104}	—	November 12, 2002	Socorro	LINEAR	·	2.3 km	MPC · JPL
143012	2002 VG_{105}	—	November 12, 2002	Socorro	LINEAR	(5)	2.1 km	MPC · JPL
143013	2002 VJ_{106}	—	November 12, 2002	Socorro	LINEAR	·	3.8 km	MPC · JPL
143014	2002 VT_{106}	—	November 12, 2002	Socorro	LINEAR	·	3.0 km	MPC · JPL
143015	2002 VN_{108}	—	November 12, 2002	Socorro	LINEAR	(5)	2.7 km	MPC · JPL
143016	2002 VQ_{108}	—	November 12, 2002	Socorro	LINEAR	·	3.4 km	MPC · JPL
143017	2002 VW_{108}	—	November 12, 2002	Socorro	LINEAR	EUN	2.2 km	MPC · JPL
143018	2002 VA_{109}	—	November 12, 2002	Socorro	LINEAR	·	2.1 km	MPC · JPL
143019	2002 VC_{109}	—	November 12, 2002	Socorro	LINEAR	EUN	2.5 km	MPC · JPL
143020	2002 VF_{110}	—	November 12, 2002	Socorro	LINEAR	·	3.2 km	MPC · JPL
143021	2002 VG_{110}	—	November 12, 2002	Socorro	LINEAR	·	3.9 km	MPC · JPL
143022	2002 VO_{110}	—	November 12, 2002	Socorro	LINEAR	·	2.8 km	MPC · JPL
143023	2002 VV_{110}	—	November 13, 2002	Palomar	NEAT	·	2.3 km	MPC · JPL
143024	2002 VO_{112}	—	November 13, 2002	Palomar	NEAT	HNS	2.8 km	MPC · JPL
143025	2002 VA_{113}	—	November 13, 2002	Palomar	NEAT	NYS	1.5 km	MPC · JPL
143026	2002 VC_{114}	—	November 13, 2002	Palomar	NEAT	·	2.4 km	MPC · JPL
143027	2002 VN_{114}	—	November 13, 2002	Palomar	NEAT	·	4.0 km	MPC · JPL
143028	2002 VK_{115}	—	November 11, 2002	Anderson Mesa	LONEOS	·	3.5 km	MPC · JPL
143029	2002 VZ_{118}	—	November 12, 2002	Socorro	LINEAR	NYS ·	3.1 km	MPC · JPL
143030	2002 VD_{119}	—	November 12, 2002	Socorro	LINEAR	(5)	2.6 km	MPC · JPL
143031	2002 VH_{119}	—	November 12, 2002	Socorro	LINEAR	·	2.1 km	MPC · JPL
143032	2002 VO_{119}	—	November 12, 2002	Socorro	LINEAR	(5)	1.9 km	MPC · JPL
143033	2002 VN_{121}	—	November 13, 2002	Socorro	LINEAR	·	4.0 km	MPC · JPL
143034	2002 VQ_{121}	—	November 13, 2002	Socorro	LINEAR	·	2.8 km	MPC · JPL
143035	2002 VS_{121}	—	November 13, 2002	Palomar	NEAT	slow	2.6 km	MPC · JPL
143036	2002 VT_{121}	—	November 13, 2002	Palomar	NEAT	·	2.5 km	MPC · JPL
143037	2002 VU_{121}	—	November 13, 2002	Palomar	NEAT	·	2.0 km	MPC · JPL
143038	2002 VE_{122}	—	November 13, 2002	Palomar	NEAT	·	2.5 km	MPC · JPL
143039	2002 VF_{122}	—	November 13, 2002	Palomar	NEAT	EUN	3.1 km	MPC · JPL
143040	2002 VX_{123}	—	November 14, 2002	Socorro	LINEAR	·	2.1 km	MPC · JPL
143041	2002 VB_{127}	—	November 13, 2002	Palomar	NEAT	·	2.7 km	MPC · JPL
143042	2002 VW_{127}	—	November 14, 2002	Palomar	NEAT	·	5.6 km	MPC · JPL
143043	2002 VH_{128}	—	November 14, 2002	Socorro	LINEAR	NYS	1.5 km	MPC · JPL
143044	2002 VO_{128}	—	November 14, 2002	Socorro	LINEAR	·	1.9 km	MPC · JPL
143045	2002 VJ_{129}	—	November 6, 2002	Socorro	LINEAR	·	3.1 km	MPC · JPL
143046	2002 VR_{131}	—	November 5, 2002	Nyukasa	National Aerospace Laboratory of Japan	·	2.0 km	MPC · JPL
143047	2002 VW_{131}	—	November 5, 2002	Nyukasa	National Aerospace Laboratory of Japan	KOR	2.0 km	MPC · JPL
143048 Margaretpenston	2002 VR_{132}	Margaretpenston	November 2, 2002	La Palma	A. Fitzsimmons, Williams, I. P.	·	2.1 km	MPC · JPL
143049	2002 VY_{134}	—	November 7, 2002	Anderson Mesa	LONEOS	·	1.8 km	MPC · JPL
143050	2002 VM_{135}	—	November 7, 2002	Socorro	LINEAR	EUN	2.2 km	MPC · JPL
143051	2002 WO_{1}	—	November 23, 2002	Palomar	NEAT	·	2.8 km	MPC · JPL
143052	2002 WY_{2}	—	November 24, 2002	Wrightwood	J. W. Young	·	2.0 km	MPC · JPL
143053	2002 WG_{3}	—	November 24, 2002	Palomar	NEAT	·	3.4 km	MPC · JPL
143054	2002 WH_{5}	—	November 24, 2002	Palomar	NEAT	KOR	2.2 km	MPC · JPL
143055	2002 WQ_{5}	—	November 23, 2002	Palomar	NEAT	·	4.0 km	MPC · JPL
143056	2002 WB_{6}	—	November 24, 2002	Palomar	NEAT	EUN	2.4 km	MPC · JPL
143057	2002 WO_{8}	—	November 24, 2002	Palomar	NEAT	MRX	1.9 km	MPC · JPL
143058	2002 WT_{8}	—	November 24, 2002	Palomar	NEAT	·	2.7 km	MPC · JPL
143059	2002 WQ_{10}	—	November 24, 2002	Palomar	NEAT	·	2.1 km	MPC · JPL
143060	2002 WF_{11}	—	November 27, 2002	Anderson Mesa	LONEOS	·	2.2 km	MPC · JPL
143061	2002 WH_{11}	—	November 23, 2002	Palomar	NEAT	·	3.2 km	MPC · JPL
143062	2002 WK_{11}	—	November 26, 2002	Kitt Peak	Spacewatch	·	4.7 km	MPC · JPL
143063	2002 WZ_{11}	—	November 27, 2002	Anderson Mesa	LONEOS	·	2.9 km	MPC · JPL
143064	2002 WC_{12}	—	November 27, 2002	Anderson Mesa	LONEOS	·	3.8 km	MPC · JPL
143065	2002 WF_{12}	—	November 27, 2002	Anderson Mesa	LONEOS	·	2.4 km	MPC · JPL
143066	2002 WZ_{13}	—	November 28, 2002	Anderson Mesa	LONEOS	·	2.6 km	MPC · JPL
143067	2002 WM_{14}	—	November 28, 2002	Anderson Mesa	LONEOS	·	3.4 km	MPC · JPL
143068	2002 WC_{15}	—	November 28, 2002	Anderson Mesa	LONEOS	·	6.1 km	MPC · JPL
143069	2002 WM_{15}	—	November 28, 2002	Anderson Mesa	LONEOS	EUN	2.2 km	MPC · JPL
143070	2002 WB_{16}	—	November 28, 2002	Anderson Mesa	LONEOS	NEM	3.5 km	MPC · JPL
143071	2002 WE_{16}	—	November 28, 2002	Haleakala	NEAT	·	3.3 km	MPC · JPL
143072	2002 WJ_{16}	—	November 28, 2002	Haleakala	NEAT	·	2.2 km	MPC · JPL
143073	2002 WD_{17}	—	November 28, 2002	Haleakala	NEAT	(5)	1.9 km	MPC · JPL
143074	2002 WK_{19}	—	November 25, 2002	Palomar	S. F. Hönig	·	1.8 km	MPC · JPL
143075	2002 WP_{20}	—	November 29, 2002	Farpoint	Farpoint	·	4.0 km	MPC · JPL
143076	2002 WE_{21}	—	November 24, 2002	Palomar	NEAT	EUN	1.9 km	MPC · JPL
143077	2002 XX_{1}	—	December 1, 2002	Socorro	LINEAR	·	4.0 km	MPC · JPL
143078	2002 XM_{2}	—	December 1, 2002	Socorro	LINEAR	·	3.4 km	MPC · JPL
143079	2002 XC_{3}	—	December 1, 2002	Socorro	LINEAR	·	3.3 km	MPC · JPL
143080	2002 XQ_{3}	—	December 2, 2002	Socorro	LINEAR	·	1.7 km	MPC · JPL
143081	2002 XC_{5}	—	December 1, 2002	Socorro	LINEAR	·	2.2 km	MPC · JPL
143082	2002 XJ_{6}	—	December 1, 2002	Socorro	LINEAR	·	2.2 km	MPC · JPL
143083	2002 XV_{6}	—	December 1, 2002	Haleakala	NEAT	·	3.5 km	MPC · JPL
143084	2002 XX_{6}	—	December 1, 2002	Haleakala	NEAT	·	2.8 km	MPC · JPL
143085	2002 XQ_{7}	—	December 2, 2002	Socorro	LINEAR	·	2.2 km	MPC · JPL
143086	2002 XN_{8}	—	December 2, 2002	Socorro	LINEAR	·	3.7 km	MPC · JPL
143087	2002 XP_{9}	—	December 2, 2002	Socorro	LINEAR	RAF	2.3 km	MPC · JPL
143088	2002 XT_{9}	—	December 2, 2002	Socorro	LINEAR	slow	2.5 km	MPC · JPL
143089	2002 XZ_{9}	—	December 2, 2002	Socorro	LINEAR	·	2.5 km	MPC · JPL
143090	2002 XC_{10}	—	December 2, 2002	Socorro	LINEAR	·	4.5 km	MPC · JPL
143091	2002 XB_{13}	—	December 3, 2002	Haleakala	NEAT	V	1.0 km	MPC · JPL
143092	2002 XD_{13}	—	December 3, 2002	Haleakala	NEAT	·	2.9 km	MPC · JPL
143093	2002 XD_{14}	—	December 5, 2002	Socorro	LINEAR	·	3.0 km	MPC · JPL
143094	2002 XA_{15}	—	December 7, 2002	Desert Eagle	W. K. Y. Yeung	·	1.8 km	MPC · JPL
143095	2002 XB_{15}	—	December 7, 2002	Desert Eagle	W. K. Y. Yeung	·	2.8 km	MPC · JPL
143096	2002 XJ_{15}	—	December 2, 2002	Socorro	LINEAR	·	3.4 km	MPC · JPL
143097	2002 XN_{17}	—	December 5, 2002	Socorro	LINEAR	·	2.8 km	MPC · JPL
143098	2002 XF_{18}	—	December 5, 2002	Socorro	LINEAR	AGN	2.4 km	MPC · JPL
143099	2002 XW_{18}	—	December 5, 2002	Socorro	LINEAR	·	5.6 km	MPC · JPL
143100	2002 XQ_{19}	—	December 2, 2002	Socorro	LINEAR	·	3.3 km	MPC · JPL

== 143101–143200 ==
back to top

Designation			Discovery			Properties		Ref
Permanent	Provisional	Named after	Date	Site	Discoverer(s)	Category	Diam.	Ref
143101	2002 XB_{20}	—	December 2, 2002	Socorro	LINEAR	·	5.2 km	MPC · JPL
143102	2002 XS_{20}	—	December 2, 2002	Socorro	LINEAR	·	2.8 km	MPC · JPL
143103	2002 XK_{21}	—	December 2, 2002	Socorro	LINEAR	·	2.1 km	MPC · JPL
143104	2002 XL_{21}	—	December 2, 2002	Socorro	LINEAR	·	2.0 km	MPC · JPL
143105	2002 XS_{21}	—	December 2, 2002	Socorro	LINEAR	fast	5.0 km	MPC · JPL
143106	2002 XN_{22}	—	December 3, 2002	Palomar	NEAT	·	4.4 km	MPC · JPL
143107	2002 XU_{23}	—	December 5, 2002	Palomar	NEAT	·	3.8 km	MPC · JPL
143108	2002 XV_{23}	—	December 5, 2002	Socorro	LINEAR	·	3.4 km	MPC · JPL
143109	2002 XL_{24}	—	December 5, 2002	Socorro	LINEAR	·	1.8 km	MPC · JPL
143110	2002 XP_{24}	—	December 5, 2002	Socorro	LINEAR	·	4.5 km	MPC · JPL
143111	2002 XS_{24}	—	December 5, 2002	Socorro	LINEAR	·	1.9 km	MPC · JPL
143112	2002 XW_{24}	—	December 5, 2002	Socorro	LINEAR	EUN	2.1 km	MPC · JPL
143113	2002 XJ_{25}	—	December 5, 2002	Socorro	LINEAR	·	5.1 km	MPC · JPL
143114	2002 XK_{26}	—	December 3, 2002	Palomar	NEAT	·	4.6 km	MPC · JPL
143115	2002 XG_{27}	—	December 5, 2002	Socorro	LINEAR	(5)	2.1 km	MPC · JPL
143116	2002 XT_{27}	—	December 5, 2002	Socorro	LINEAR	slow	3.0 km	MPC · JPL
143117	2002 XZ_{27}	—	December 5, 2002	Socorro	LINEAR	·	1.6 km	MPC · JPL
143118	2002 XJ_{28}	—	December 5, 2002	Socorro	LINEAR	·	2.4 km	MPC · JPL
143119	2002 XL_{28}	—	December 5, 2002	Socorro	LINEAR	·	3.0 km	MPC · JPL
143120	2002 XQ_{28}	—	December 5, 2002	Socorro	LINEAR	·	2.6 km	MPC · JPL
143121	2002 XF_{29}	—	December 5, 2002	Kitt Peak	Spacewatch	GEF ·	4.0 km	MPC · JPL
143122	2002 XH_{31}	—	December 6, 2002	Socorro	LINEAR	·	3.2 km	MPC · JPL
143123	2002 XS_{31}	—	December 6, 2002	Socorro	LINEAR	WIT	1.4 km	MPC · JPL
143124	2002 XU_{31}	—	December 6, 2002	Socorro	LINEAR	·	3.1 km	MPC · JPL
143125	2002 XY_{31}	—	December 6, 2002	Socorro	LINEAR	·	1.9 km	MPC · JPL
143126	2002 XV_{32}	—	December 6, 2002	Socorro	LINEAR	·	5.4 km	MPC · JPL
143127	2002 XW_{32}	—	December 6, 2002	Socorro	LINEAR	·	3.6 km	MPC · JPL
143128	2002 XU_{33}	—	December 5, 2002	Socorro	LINEAR	·	2.9 km	MPC · JPL
143129	2002 XA_{34}	—	December 5, 2002	Socorro	LINEAR	slow	2.9 km	MPC · JPL
143130	2002 XF_{34}	—	December 5, 2002	Socorro	LINEAR	(12739)	2.8 km	MPC · JPL
143131	2002 XE_{35}	—	December 7, 2002	Kitt Peak	Spacewatch	EOS	3.6 km	MPC · JPL
143132	2002 XN_{35}	—	December 5, 2002	Socorro	LINEAR	·	3.2 km	MPC · JPL
143133	2002 XB_{36}	—	December 5, 2002	Socorro	LINEAR	·	2.0 km	MPC · JPL
143134	2002 XS_{37}	—	December 8, 2002	Palomar	NEAT	·	3.1 km	MPC · JPL
143135	2002 XY_{37}	—	December 6, 2002	Socorro	LINEAR	TRE	5.4 km	MPC · JPL
143136	2002 XC_{38}	—	December 6, 2002	Socorro	LINEAR	·	2.6 km	MPC · JPL
143137	2002 XK_{38}	—	December 6, 2002	Socorro	LINEAR	(5)	1.7 km	MPC · JPL
143138	2002 XU_{38}	—	December 7, 2002	Socorro	LINEAR	·	5.8 km	MPC · JPL
143139 Kučáková	2002 XC_{39}	Kučáková	December 7, 2002	Ondřejov	P. Pravec, P. Kušnirák	·	4.4 km	MPC · JPL
143140	2002 XT_{39}	—	December 10, 2002	Socorro	LINEAR	V	1.5 km	MPC · JPL
143141	2002 XY_{40}	—	December 6, 2002	Socorro	LINEAR	EUN	3.6 km	MPC · JPL
143142	2002 XF_{41}	—	December 6, 2002	Socorro	LINEAR	·	5.7 km	MPC · JPL
143143	2002 XH_{41}	—	December 6, 2002	Socorro	LINEAR	EUN	2.4 km	MPC · JPL
143144	2002 XU_{41}	—	December 6, 2002	Socorro	LINEAR	·	2.2 km	MPC · JPL
143145	2002 XC_{42}	—	December 6, 2002	Socorro	LINEAR	V	1.2 km	MPC · JPL
143146	2002 XL_{42}	—	December 6, 2002	Socorro	LINEAR	·	4.3 km	MPC · JPL
143147	2002 XT_{42}	—	December 8, 2002	Kitt Peak	Spacewatch	·	2.1 km	MPC · JPL
143148	2002 XO_{43}	—	December 6, 2002	Socorro	LINEAR	MAR	1.6 km	MPC · JPL
143149	2002 XC_{44}	—	December 6, 2002	Socorro	LINEAR	PAD	3.4 km	MPC · JPL
143150	2002 XJ_{45}	—	December 10, 2002	Socorro	LINEAR	·	2.8 km	MPC · JPL
143151	2002 XC_{46}	—	December 10, 2002	Palomar	NEAT	·	6.7 km	MPC · JPL
143152	2002 XE_{48}	—	December 10, 2002	Socorro	LINEAR	·	1.8 km	MPC · JPL
143153	2002 XV_{48}	—	December 10, 2002	Socorro	LINEAR	·	4.2 km	MPC · JPL
143154	2002 XA_{50}	—	December 10, 2002	Socorro	LINEAR	·	2.1 km	MPC · JPL
143155	2002 XS_{50}	—	December 10, 2002	Socorro	LINEAR	KOR	2.0 km	MPC · JPL
143156	2002 XC_{51}	—	December 10, 2002	Socorro	LINEAR	·	1.8 km	MPC · JPL
143157	2002 XN_{51}	—	December 10, 2002	Socorro	LINEAR	·	3.9 km	MPC · JPL
143158	2002 XO_{54}	—	December 10, 2002	Palomar	NEAT	·	2.1 km	MPC · JPL
143159	2002 XR_{54}	—	December 10, 2002	Palomar	NEAT	·	2.9 km	MPC · JPL
143160	2002 XP_{55}	—	December 10, 2002	Palomar	NEAT	·	2.5 km	MPC · JPL
143161	2002 XA_{56}	—	December 8, 2002	Haleakala	NEAT	RAF	2.6 km	MPC · JPL
143162	2002 XQ_{57}	—	December 10, 2002	Palomar	NEAT	·	8.1 km	MPC · JPL
143163	2002 XY_{57}	—	December 11, 2002	Socorro	LINEAR	(5)	1.9 km	MPC · JPL
143164	2002 XF_{58}	—	December 11, 2002	Socorro	LINEAR	·	2.3 km	MPC · JPL
143165	2002 XO_{58}	—	December 11, 2002	Socorro	LINEAR	·	2.7 km	MPC · JPL
143166	2002 XZ_{59}	—	December 10, 2002	Socorro	LINEAR	·	3.8 km	MPC · JPL
143167	2002 XC_{60}	—	December 10, 2002	Socorro	LINEAR	·	4.7 km	MPC · JPL
143168	2002 XO_{62}	—	December 11, 2002	Socorro	LINEAR	·	5.4 km	MPC · JPL
143169	2002 XZ_{62}	—	December 11, 2002	Socorro	LINEAR	·	3.8 km	MPC · JPL
143170	2002 XJ_{64}	—	December 11, 2002	Socorro	LINEAR	·	2.2 km	MPC · JPL
143171	2002 XH_{65}	—	December 12, 2002	Socorro	LINEAR	·	7.7 km	MPC · JPL
143172	2002 XA_{67}	—	December 10, 2002	Kitt Peak	Spacewatch	·	2.4 km	MPC · JPL
143173	2002 XF_{67}	—	December 10, 2002	Palomar	NEAT	EUN	3.4 km	MPC · JPL
143174	2002 XD_{68}	—	December 11, 2002	Palomar	NEAT	·	1.9 km	MPC · JPL
143175	2002 XJ_{68}	—	December 12, 2002	Palomar	NEAT	·	4.7 km	MPC · JPL
143176	2002 XB_{73}	—	December 11, 2002	Socorro	LINEAR	EUN	4.1 km	MPC · JPL
143177	2002 XF_{73}	—	December 11, 2002	Socorro	LINEAR	(5)	3.9 km	MPC · JPL
143178	2002 XN_{73}	—	December 11, 2002	Socorro	LINEAR	·	5.0 km	MPC · JPL
143179	2002 XB_{74}	—	December 11, 2002	Socorro	LINEAR	·	4.6 km	MPC · JPL
143180	2002 XE_{75}	—	December 11, 2002	Socorro	LINEAR	·	3.8 km	MPC · JPL
143181	2002 XU_{75}	—	December 11, 2002	Socorro	LINEAR	·	3.7 km	MPC · JPL
143182	2002 XL_{76}	—	December 11, 2002	Socorro	LINEAR	·	1.9 km	MPC · JPL
143183	2002 XE_{77}	—	December 11, 2002	Socorro	LINEAR	·	3.5 km	MPC · JPL
143184	2002 XK_{77}	—	December 11, 2002	Socorro	LINEAR	·	3.3 km	MPC · JPL
143185	2002 XS_{77}	—	December 11, 2002	Socorro	LINEAR	·	4.1 km	MPC · JPL
143186	2002 XP_{78}	—	December 11, 2002	Socorro	LINEAR	(5)	1.5 km	MPC · JPL
143187	2002 XT_{78}	—	December 11, 2002	Socorro	LINEAR	·	2.5 km	MPC · JPL
143188	2002 XW_{78}	—	December 11, 2002	Socorro	LINEAR	·	3.1 km	MPC · JPL
143189	2002 XB_{79}	—	December 11, 2002	Socorro	LINEAR	·	2.5 km	MPC · JPL
143190	2002 XQ_{80}	—	December 11, 2002	Socorro	LINEAR	·	3.4 km	MPC · JPL
143191	2002 XO_{81}	—	December 11, 2002	Socorro	LINEAR	(5)	2.5 km	MPC · JPL
143192	2002 XB_{83}	—	December 13, 2002	Palomar	NEAT	·	5.2 km	MPC · JPL
143193	2002 XV_{83}	—	December 13, 2002	Palomar	NEAT	·	2.1 km	MPC · JPL
143194	2002 XT_{84}	—	December 11, 2002	Palomar	NEAT	·	4.4 km	MPC · JPL
143195	2002 XW_{84}	—	December 14, 2002	Socorro	LINEAR	ADE	4.5 km	MPC · JPL
143196	2002 XE_{85}	—	December 11, 2002	Socorro	LINEAR	·	4.8 km	MPC · JPL
143197	2002 XL_{86}	—	December 11, 2002	Socorro	LINEAR	EUN	2.4 km	MPC · JPL
143198	2002 XH_{87}	—	December 11, 2002	Socorro	LINEAR	·	2.0 km	MPC · JPL
143199	2002 XJ_{87}	—	December 11, 2002	Socorro	LINEAR	·	3.7 km	MPC · JPL
143200	2002 XV_{87}	—	December 12, 2002	Palomar	NEAT	·	4.8 km	MPC · JPL

== 143201–143300 ==
back to top

Designation			Discovery			Properties		Ref
Permanent	Provisional	Named after	Date	Site	Discoverer(s)	Category	Diam.	Ref
143201	2002 XC_{88}	—	December 12, 2002	Palomar	NEAT	·	5.3 km	MPC · JPL
143202	2002 XS_{89}	—	December 14, 2002	Socorro	LINEAR	·	3.8 km	MPC · JPL
143203	2002 XX_{89}	—	December 14, 2002	Socorro	LINEAR	·	4.3 km	MPC · JPL
143204	2002 XF_{90}	—	December 14, 2002	Socorro	LINEAR	·	4.9 km	MPC · JPL
143205	2002 XQ_{92}	—	December 5, 2002	Kitt Peak	M. W. Buie	·	1.3 km	MPC · JPL
143206	2002 XS_{92}	—	December 5, 2002	Kitt Peak	M. W. Buie	·	2.6 km	MPC · JPL
143207	2002 XD_{101}	—	December 5, 2002	Socorro	LINEAR	·	2.5 km	MPC · JPL
143208	2002 XG_{101}	—	December 5, 2002	Socorro	LINEAR	·	4.5 km	MPC · JPL
143209	2002 XR_{105}	—	December 5, 2002	Socorro	LINEAR	·	2.1 km	MPC · JPL
143210	2002 XE_{107}	—	December 5, 2002	Socorro	LINEAR	V	1.3 km	MPC · JPL
143211	2002 XO_{109}	—	December 6, 2002	Socorro	LINEAR	·	2.7 km	MPC · JPL
143212	2002 YG	—	December 27, 2002	Anderson Mesa	LONEOS	·	4.2 km	MPC · JPL
143213	2002 YS	—	December 27, 2002	Anderson Mesa	LONEOS	·	4.7 km	MPC · JPL
143214	2002 YY	—	December 27, 2002	Anderson Mesa	LONEOS	·	1.4 km	MPC · JPL
143215	2002 YE_{1}	—	December 27, 2002	Anderson Mesa	LONEOS	·	5.2 km	MPC · JPL
143216	2002 YP_{1}	—	December 27, 2002	Anderson Mesa	LONEOS	·	2.4 km	MPC · JPL
143217	2002 YA_{3}	—	December 28, 2002	Ametlla de Mar	Ametlla de Mar	·	3.9 km	MPC · JPL
143218	2002 YL_{3}	—	December 27, 2002	Anderson Mesa	LONEOS	·	2.2 km	MPC · JPL
143219	2002 YY_{3}	—	December 28, 2002	Socorro	LINEAR	·	2.9 km	MPC · JPL
143220	2002 YY_{4}	—	December 28, 2002	Socorro	LINEAR	·	4.6 km	MPC · JPL
143221	2002 YL_{6}	—	December 28, 2002	Anderson Mesa	LONEOS	·	4.8 km	MPC · JPL
143222	2002 YB_{10}	—	December 31, 2002	Socorro	LINEAR	·	3.0 km	MPC · JPL
143223	2002 YN_{11}	—	December 30, 2002	Socorro	LINEAR	·	6.6 km	MPC · JPL
143224	2002 YX_{12}	—	December 31, 2002	Socorro	LINEAR	·	2.2 km	MPC · JPL
143225	2002 YF_{13}	—	December 31, 2002	Socorro	LINEAR	AGN	1.9 km	MPC · JPL
143226	2002 YA_{16}	—	December 31, 2002	Socorro	LINEAR	NYS	1.8 km	MPC · JPL
143227	2002 YK_{17}	—	December 31, 2002	Socorro	LINEAR	·	2.2 km	MPC · JPL
143228	2002 YV_{17}	—	December 31, 2002	Socorro	LINEAR	·	1.5 km	MPC · JPL
143229	2002 YY_{17}	—	December 31, 2002	Socorro	LINEAR	·	1.8 km	MPC · JPL
143230	2002 YK_{18}	—	December 31, 2002	Socorro	LINEAR	·	2.6 km	MPC · JPL
143231	2002 YO_{18}	—	December 31, 2002	Socorro	LINEAR	·	2.6 km	MPC · JPL
143232	2002 YU_{19}	—	December 31, 2002	Socorro	LINEAR	·	2.2 km	MPC · JPL
143233	2002 YK_{20}	—	December 31, 2002	Socorro	LINEAR	·	3.0 km	MPC · JPL
143234	2002 YT_{20}	—	December 31, 2002	Socorro	LINEAR	·	2.0 km	MPC · JPL
143235	2002 YZ_{20}	—	December 31, 2002	Socorro	LINEAR	MAS	1.2 km	MPC · JPL
143236	2002 YA_{21}	—	December 31, 2002	Socorro	LINEAR	·	3.7 km	MPC · JPL
143237	2002 YB_{21}	—	December 31, 2002	Socorro	LINEAR	·	2.0 km	MPC · JPL
143238	2002 YF_{21}	—	December 31, 2002	Socorro	LINEAR	·	2.1 km	MPC · JPL
143239	2002 YC_{22}	—	December 31, 2002	Socorro	LINEAR	·	3.4 km	MPC · JPL
143240	2002 YC_{24}	—	December 31, 2002	Socorro	LINEAR	·	4.3 km	MPC · JPL
143241	2002 YV_{24}	—	December 31, 2002	Socorro	LINEAR	PHO	2.5 km	MPC · JPL
143242	2002 YM_{25}	—	December 31, 2002	Socorro	LINEAR	·	2.6 km	MPC · JPL
143243	2002 YA_{26}	—	December 31, 2002	Socorro	LINEAR	T_{j} (2.93) · CYB	9.6 km	MPC · JPL
143244	2002 YJ_{26}	—	December 31, 2002	Socorro	LINEAR	GEF	2.1 km	MPC · JPL
143245	2002 YG_{27}	—	December 31, 2002	Socorro	LINEAR	NYS	2.7 km	MPC · JPL
143246	2002 YK_{27}	—	December 31, 2002	Socorro	LINEAR	EOS	4.1 km	MPC · JPL
143247	2002 YJ_{28}	—	December 31, 2002	Socorro	LINEAR	·	2.7 km	MPC · JPL
143248	2002 YS_{28}	—	December 31, 2002	Socorro	LINEAR	·	3.1 km	MPC · JPL
143249	2002 YP_{29}	—	December 31, 2002	Socorro	LINEAR	NYS	2.1 km	MPC · JPL
143250	2002 YU_{30}	—	December 31, 2002	Socorro	LINEAR	EOS	3.6 km	MPC · JPL
143251	2002 YY_{30}	—	December 31, 2002	Socorro	LINEAR	KOR	2.3 km	MPC · JPL
143252	2002 YG_{31}	—	December 31, 2002	Socorro	LINEAR	GEF	2.5 km	MPC · JPL
143253	2002 YL_{31}	—	December 31, 2002	Socorro	LINEAR	NYS	1.8 km	MPC · JPL
143254	2002 YL_{35}	—	December 31, 2002	Socorro	LINEAR	·	2.8 km	MPC · JPL
143255	2002 YV_{35}	—	December 31, 2002	Socorro	LINEAR	·	1.7 km	MPC · JPL
143256	2002 YZ_{35}	—	December 31, 2002	Socorro	LINEAR	LEO	4.4 km	MPC · JPL
143257	2003 AE	—	January 1, 2003	Socorro	LINEAR	·	1.9 km	MPC · JPL
143258	2003 AU_{1}	—	January 2, 2003	Socorro	LINEAR	·	2.6 km	MPC · JPL
143259	2003 AO_{2}	—	January 2, 2003	Socorro	LINEAR	PHO	2.1 km	MPC · JPL
143260	2003 AA_{6}	—	January 1, 2003	Socorro	LINEAR	·	4.0 km	MPC · JPL
143261	2003 AB_{7}	—	January 2, 2003	Socorro	LINEAR	RAF	2.5 km	MPC · JPL
143262	2003 AF_{7}	—	January 2, 2003	Socorro	LINEAR	MAR	2.8 km	MPC · JPL
143263	2003 AQ_{7}	—	January 2, 2003	Socorro	LINEAR	·	6.4 km	MPC · JPL
143264	2003 AW_{9}	—	January 4, 2003	Kitt Peak	Spacewatch	·	5.6 km	MPC · JPL
143265	2003 AN_{10}	—	January 1, 2003	Socorro	LINEAR	·	4.4 km	MPC · JPL
143266	2003 AF_{11}	—	January 1, 2003	Socorro	LINEAR	ADE	5.1 km	MPC · JPL
143267	2003 AJ_{11}	—	January 1, 2003	Socorro	LINEAR	·	6.8 km	MPC · JPL
143268	2003 AA_{12}	—	January 1, 2003	Socorro	LINEAR	JUN	1.8 km	MPC · JPL
143269	2003 AK_{12}	—	January 1, 2003	Socorro	LINEAR	·	2.9 km	MPC · JPL
143270	2003 AG_{13}	—	January 1, 2003	Socorro	LINEAR	·	4.9 km	MPC · JPL
143271	2003 AF_{14}	—	January 2, 2003	Socorro	LINEAR	PHO	2.5 km	MPC · JPL
143272	2003 AN_{14}	—	January 2, 2003	Socorro	LINEAR	·	3.0 km	MPC · JPL
143273	2003 AB_{15}	—	January 2, 2003	Anderson Mesa	LONEOS	·	3.2 km	MPC · JPL
143274	2003 AU_{15}	—	January 4, 2003	Socorro	LINEAR	·	2.9 km	MPC · JPL
143275	2003 AJ_{16}	—	January 1, 2003	Socorro	LINEAR	·	3.4 km	MPC · JPL
143276	2003 AA_{18}	—	January 5, 2003	Anderson Mesa	LONEOS	EUN	2.5 km	MPC · JPL
143277	2003 AG_{19}	—	January 4, 2003	Anderson Mesa	LONEOS	·	2.8 km	MPC · JPL
143278	2003 AK_{21}	—	January 5, 2003	Socorro	LINEAR	·	5.5 km	MPC · JPL
143279	2003 AW_{24}	—	January 4, 2003	Socorro	LINEAR	·	2.5 km	MPC · JPL
143280	2003 AB_{25}	—	January 4, 2003	Socorro	LINEAR	·	2.5 km	MPC · JPL
143281	2003 AJ_{25}	—	January 4, 2003	Socorro	LINEAR	·	2.4 km	MPC · JPL
143282	2003 AL_{25}	—	January 4, 2003	Socorro	LINEAR	·	2.9 km	MPC · JPL
143283	2003 AX_{25}	—	January 4, 2003	Socorro	LINEAR	CYB	8.1 km	MPC · JPL
143284	2003 AA_{26}	—	January 4, 2003	Socorro	LINEAR	MAS	1.4 km	MPC · JPL
143285	2003 AS_{26}	—	January 4, 2003	Socorro	LINEAR	·	3.9 km	MPC · JPL
143286	2003 AT_{29}	—	January 4, 2003	Socorro	LINEAR	·	3.8 km	MPC · JPL
143287	2003 AL_{30}	—	January 4, 2003	Socorro	LINEAR	·	3.7 km	MPC · JPL
143288	2003 AK_{33}	—	January 5, 2003	Socorro	LINEAR	·	4.3 km	MPC · JPL
143289	2003 AL_{33}	—	January 5, 2003	Socorro	LINEAR	·	1.7 km	MPC · JPL
143290	2003 AW_{33}	—	January 5, 2003	Kitt Peak	Spacewatch	EOS	5.3 km	MPC · JPL
143291	2003 AZ_{33}	—	January 5, 2003	Socorro	LINEAR	·	2.6 km	MPC · JPL
143292	2003 AO_{34}	—	January 7, 2003	Socorro	LINEAR	·	1.9 km	MPC · JPL
143293	2003 AS_{34}	—	January 7, 2003	Socorro	LINEAR	·	2.3 km	MPC · JPL
143294	2003 AV_{34}	—	January 7, 2003	Socorro	LINEAR	(5)	2.6 km	MPC · JPL
143295	2003 AA_{35}	—	January 7, 2003	Socorro	LINEAR	·	4.8 km	MPC · JPL
143296	2003 AF_{36}	—	January 7, 2003	Socorro	LINEAR	·	2.5 km	MPC · JPL
143297	2003 AU_{37}	—	January 7, 2003	Socorro	LINEAR	NYS	2.2 km	MPC · JPL
143298	2003 AW_{38}	—	January 7, 2003	Socorro	LINEAR	·	3.2 km	MPC · JPL
143299	2003 AC_{39}	—	January 7, 2003	Socorro	LINEAR	·	1.9 km	MPC · JPL
143300	2003 AD_{39}	—	January 7, 2003	Socorro	LINEAR	·	3.6 km	MPC · JPL

== 143301–143400 ==
back to top

Designation			Discovery			Properties		Ref
Permanent	Provisional	Named after	Date	Site	Discoverer(s)	Category	Diam.	Ref
143301	2003 AO_{39}	—	January 7, 2003	Socorro	LINEAR	·	2.5 km	MPC · JPL
143302	2003 AZ_{39}	—	January 7, 2003	Socorro	LINEAR	·	4.0 km	MPC · JPL
143303	2003 AF_{40}	—	January 7, 2003	Socorro	LINEAR	·	4.2 km	MPC · JPL
143304	2003 AU_{40}	—	January 7, 2003	Socorro	LINEAR	·	5.1 km	MPC · JPL
143305	2003 AD_{41}	—	January 7, 2003	Socorro	LINEAR	·	2.5 km	MPC · JPL
143306	2003 AE_{41}	—	January 7, 2003	Socorro	LINEAR	·	3.4 km	MPC · JPL
143307	2003 AK_{41}	—	January 7, 2003	Socorro	LINEAR	·	2.1 km	MPC · JPL
143308	2003 AQ_{41}	—	January 7, 2003	Socorro	LINEAR	·	1.9 km	MPC · JPL
143309	2003 AM_{42}	—	January 7, 2003	Socorro	LINEAR	·	1.7 km	MPC · JPL
143310	2003 AV_{42}	—	January 5, 2003	Socorro	LINEAR	·	5.4 km	MPC · JPL
143311	2003 AW_{45}	—	January 5, 2003	Socorro	LINEAR	·	1.9 km	MPC · JPL
143312	2003 AB_{47}	—	January 5, 2003	Socorro	LINEAR	·	2.3 km	MPC · JPL
143313	2003 AC_{47}	—	January 5, 2003	Socorro	LINEAR	EOS	4.9 km	MPC · JPL
143314	2003 AL_{47}	—	January 5, 2003	Socorro	LINEAR	·	2.2 km	MPC · JPL
143315	2003 AQ_{48}	—	January 5, 2003	Socorro	LINEAR	EOS	3.7 km	MPC · JPL
143316	2003 AY_{48}	—	January 5, 2003	Socorro	LINEAR	·	3.2 km	MPC · JPL
143317	2003 AS_{51}	—	January 5, 2003	Socorro	LINEAR	AGN	2.0 km	MPC · JPL
143318	2003 AQ_{53}	—	January 5, 2003	Socorro	LINEAR	·	3.9 km	MPC · JPL
143319	2003 AV_{54}	—	January 5, 2003	Socorro	LINEAR	HOF	4.9 km	MPC · JPL
143320	2003 AY_{56}	—	January 5, 2003	Socorro	LINEAR	·	6.4 km	MPC · JPL
143321	2003 AP_{57}	—	January 5, 2003	Socorro	LINEAR	·	2.8 km	MPC · JPL
143322	2003 AV_{57}	—	January 5, 2003	Socorro	LINEAR	·	3.0 km	MPC · JPL
143323	2003 AE_{58}	—	January 5, 2003	Socorro	LINEAR	·	2.6 km	MPC · JPL
143324	2003 AO_{60}	—	January 7, 2003	Socorro	LINEAR	·	2.1 km	MPC · JPL
143325	2003 AX_{61}	—	January 7, 2003	Socorro	LINEAR	·	3.4 km	MPC · JPL
143326	2003 AL_{62}	—	January 8, 2003	Socorro	LINEAR	·	5.8 km	MPC · JPL
143327	2003 AV_{63}	—	January 8, 2003	Socorro	LINEAR	EOS	4.0 km	MPC · JPL
143328	2003 AD_{64}	—	January 7, 2003	Socorro	LINEAR	·	2.3 km	MPC · JPL
143329	2003 AP_{64}	—	January 7, 2003	Socorro	LINEAR	EUN	2.0 km	MPC · JPL
143330	2003 AL_{65}	—	January 7, 2003	Socorro	LINEAR	·	3.4 km	MPC · JPL
143331	2003 AN_{65}	—	January 7, 2003	Socorro	LINEAR	·	4.1 km	MPC · JPL
143332	2003 AD_{66}	—	January 7, 2003	Socorro	LINEAR	·	1.7 km	MPC · JPL
143333	2003 AJ_{66}	—	January 7, 2003	Socorro	LINEAR	·	3.3 km	MPC · JPL
143334	2003 AK_{70}	—	January 10, 2003	Socorro	LINEAR	TIR	4.8 km	MPC · JPL
143335	2003 AA_{72}	—	January 10, 2003	Socorro	LINEAR	·	3.1 km	MPC · JPL
143336	2003 AV_{73}	—	January 10, 2003	Socorro	LINEAR	·	3.2 km	MPC · JPL
143337	2003 AW_{73}	—	January 10, 2003	Socorro	LINEAR	·	5.2 km	MPC · JPL
143338	2003 AX_{73}	—	January 10, 2003	Socorro	LINEAR	·	3.2 km	MPC · JPL
143339	2003 AZ_{73}	—	January 10, 2003	Socorro	LINEAR	EUN	2.3 km	MPC · JPL
143340	2003 AC_{74}	—	January 10, 2003	Socorro	LINEAR	DOR	8.4 km	MPC · JPL
143341	2003 AV_{75}	—	January 10, 2003	Socorro	LINEAR	·	5.8 km	MPC · JPL
143342	2003 AW_{75}	—	January 10, 2003	Socorro	LINEAR	·	3.3 km	MPC · JPL
143343	2003 AH_{76}	—	January 10, 2003	Socorro	LINEAR	DOR	4.6 km	MPC · JPL
143344	2003 AT_{77}	—	January 10, 2003	Socorro	LINEAR	·	3.8 km	MPC · JPL
143345	2003 AF_{78}	—	January 10, 2003	Socorro	LINEAR	·	2.5 km	MPC · JPL
143346	2003 AS_{78}	—	January 10, 2003	Kitt Peak	Spacewatch	·	3.3 km	MPC · JPL
143347	2003 AR_{80}	—	January 11, 2003	Socorro	LINEAR	·	3.5 km	MPC · JPL
143348	2003 AE_{81}	—	January 12, 2003	Anderson Mesa	LONEOS	·	3.3 km	MPC · JPL
143349	2003 AG_{81}	—	January 10, 2003	Socorro	LINEAR	ADE	5.8 km	MPC · JPL
143350	2003 AW_{81}	—	January 12, 2003	Anderson Mesa	LONEOS	·	4.0 km	MPC · JPL
143351	2003 AD_{84}	—	January 11, 2003	Kitt Peak	Spacewatch	·	1.3 km	MPC · JPL
143352	2003 AB_{85}	—	January 7, 2003	Kitt Peak	Deep Lens Survey	·	4.1 km	MPC · JPL
143353	2003 AP_{86}	—	January 1, 2003	Socorro	LINEAR	(5)	1.7 km	MPC · JPL
143354	2003 AS_{87}	—	January 1, 2003	Socorro	LINEAR	·	5.6 km	MPC · JPL
143355	2003 AD_{88}	—	January 2, 2003	Socorro	LINEAR	·	5.1 km	MPC · JPL
143356	2003 AK_{92}	—	January 7, 2003	Socorro	LINEAR	·	7.4 km	MPC · JPL
143357	2003 AS_{92}	—	January 10, 2003	Goodricke-Pigott	Goodricke-Pigott	·	3.9 km	MPC · JPL
143358	2003 BF	—	January 18, 2003	Palomar	NEAT	·	2.7 km	MPC · JPL
143359	2003 BV	—	January 24, 2003	Palomar	NEAT	·	6.1 km	MPC · JPL
143360	2003 BB_{2}	—	January 25, 2003	Anderson Mesa	LONEOS	·	2.5 km	MPC · JPL
143361	2003 BP_{2}	—	January 26, 2003	Kitt Peak	Spacewatch	(5)	2.4 km	MPC · JPL
143362	2003 BC_{6}	—	January 23, 2003	Kvistaberg	Uppsala-DLR Asteroid Survey	·	6.9 km	MPC · JPL
143363	2003 BK_{6}	—	January 24, 2003	Palomar	NEAT	·	4.6 km	MPC · JPL
143364	2003 BL_{6}	—	January 24, 2003	Palomar	NEAT	·	5.2 km	MPC · JPL
143365	2003 BH_{7}	—	January 25, 2003	Anderson Mesa	LONEOS	·	3.5 km	MPC · JPL
143366	2003 BL_{7}	—	January 25, 2003	Palomar	NEAT	·	2.9 km	MPC · JPL
143367	2003 BA_{8}	—	January 26, 2003	Palomar	NEAT	EUN	2.2 km	MPC · JPL
143368	2003 BT_{8}	—	January 26, 2003	Anderson Mesa	LONEOS	·	5.5 km	MPC · JPL
143369	2003 BB_{9}	—	January 26, 2003	Anderson Mesa	LONEOS	·	6.6 km	MPC · JPL
143370	2003 BJ_{9}	—	January 26, 2003	Palomar	NEAT	NYS	1.9 km	MPC · JPL
143371	2003 BN_{10}	—	January 26, 2003	Anderson Mesa	LONEOS	EOS	3.7 km	MPC · JPL
143372	2003 BB_{11}	—	January 26, 2003	Anderson Mesa	LONEOS	·	5.2 km	MPC · JPL
143373	2003 BK_{12}	—	January 26, 2003	Anderson Mesa	LONEOS	·	3.8 km	MPC · JPL
143374	2003 BE_{13}	—	January 26, 2003	Haleakala	NEAT	NYS	2.7 km	MPC · JPL
143375	2003 BG_{13}	—	January 26, 2003	Haleakala	NEAT	EOS	3.7 km	MPC · JPL
143376	2003 BB_{15}	—	January 26, 2003	Haleakala	NEAT	·	6.5 km	MPC · JPL
143377	2003 BD_{15}	—	January 26, 2003	Haleakala	NEAT	·	5.3 km	MPC · JPL
143378	2003 BU_{16}	—	January 26, 2003	Haleakala	NEAT	·	3.3 km	MPC · JPL
143379	2003 BA_{18}	—	January 27, 2003	Socorro	LINEAR	(5)	1.9 km	MPC · JPL
143380	2003 BH_{19}	—	January 26, 2003	Anderson Mesa	LONEOS	·	4.2 km	MPC · JPL
143381	2003 BC_{21}	—	January 27, 2003	Haleakala	NEAT	AMO +1km	2.0 km	MPC · JPL
143382	2003 BT_{21}	—	January 27, 2003	Anderson Mesa	LONEOS	·	1.4 km	MPC · JPL
143383	2003 BR_{24}	—	January 25, 2003	Palomar	NEAT	·	4.0 km	MPC · JPL
143384	2003 BZ_{24}	—	January 25, 2003	Palomar	NEAT	EOS	3.2 km	MPC · JPL
143385	2003 BR_{25}	—	January 26, 2003	Palomar	NEAT	EUN	2.6 km	MPC · JPL
143386	2003 BY_{25}	—	January 26, 2003	Palomar	NEAT	·	6.9 km	MPC · JPL
143387	2003 BG_{26}	—	January 26, 2003	Palomar	NEAT	JUN	1.7 km	MPC · JPL
143388	2003 BN_{26}	—	January 26, 2003	Palomar	NEAT	·	4.3 km	MPC · JPL
143389	2003 BK_{27}	—	January 26, 2003	Anderson Mesa	LONEOS	·	5.7 km	MPC · JPL
143390	2003 BN_{27}	—	January 26, 2003	Anderson Mesa	LONEOS	(5)	2.2 km	MPC · JPL
143391	2003 BM_{28}	—	January 26, 2003	Haleakala	NEAT	DOR	4.7 km	MPC · JPL
143392	2003 BT_{28}	—	January 27, 2003	Anderson Mesa	LONEOS	ADE	4.1 km	MPC · JPL
143393	2003 BX_{28}	—	January 27, 2003	Socorro	LINEAR	·	2.6 km	MPC · JPL
143394	2003 BG_{29}	—	January 27, 2003	Anderson Mesa	LONEOS	·	3.9 km	MPC · JPL
143395	2003 BU_{29}	—	January 27, 2003	Socorro	LINEAR	·	5.8 km	MPC · JPL
143396	2003 BP_{30}	—	January 27, 2003	Socorro	LINEAR	·	3.5 km	MPC · JPL
143397	2003 BC_{32}	—	January 27, 2003	Palomar	NEAT	·	1.1 km	MPC · JPL
143398	2003 BE_{34}	—	January 25, 2003	La Silla	A. Boattini, H. Scholl	EOS	3.2 km	MPC · JPL
143399	2003 BU_{34}	—	January 27, 2003	Anderson Mesa	LONEOS	·	3.4 km	MPC · JPL
143400	2003 BX_{34}	—	January 27, 2003	Socorro	LINEAR	·	4.3 km	MPC · JPL

== 143401–143500 ==
back to top

Designation			Discovery			Properties		Ref
Permanent	Provisional	Named after	Date	Site	Discoverer(s)	Category	Diam.	Ref
143401	2003 BF_{37}	—	January 28, 2003	Kitt Peak	Spacewatch	·	5.7 km	MPC · JPL
143402	2003 BL_{42}	—	January 28, 2003	Socorro	LINEAR	·	6.7 km	MPC · JPL
143403	2003 BT_{42}	—	January 29, 2003	Palomar	NEAT	·	3.9 km	MPC · JPL
143404	2003 BD_{44}	—	January 30, 2003	Anderson Mesa	LONEOS	APO +1km · PHA	1.4 km	MPC · JPL
143405	2003 BE_{44}	—	January 26, 2003	Palomar	NEAT	EUN	2.6 km	MPC · JPL
143406	2003 BV_{44}	—	January 27, 2003	Anderson Mesa	LONEOS	NYS	2.9 km	MPC · JPL
143407	2003 BJ_{45}	—	January 28, 2003	Haleakala	NEAT	·	3.1 km	MPC · JPL
143408	2003 BS_{45}	—	January 29, 2003	Kitt Peak	Spacewatch	·	3.0 km	MPC · JPL
143409	2003 BQ_{46}	—	January 28, 2003	Socorro	LINEAR	AMO +1km	940 m	MPC · JPL
143410	2003 BJ_{47}	—	January 30, 2003	Socorro	LINEAR	·	3.9 km	MPC · JPL
143411	2003 BS_{48}	—	January 26, 2003	Anderson Mesa	LONEOS	(11097) · CYB	5.0 km	MPC · JPL
143412	2003 BV_{48}	—	January 26, 2003	Kitt Peak	Spacewatch	·	3.3 km	MPC · JPL
143413	2003 BF_{49}	—	January 26, 2003	Haleakala	NEAT	CYB	9.3 km	MPC · JPL
143414	2003 BQ_{50}	—	January 27, 2003	Socorro	LINEAR	·	3.0 km	MPC · JPL
143415	2003 BF_{51}	—	January 27, 2003	Socorro	LINEAR	·	3.8 km	MPC · JPL
143416	2003 BG_{51}	—	January 27, 2003	Socorro	LINEAR	·	1.8 km	MPC · JPL
143417	2003 BN_{52}	—	January 27, 2003	Socorro	LINEAR	·	7.0 km	MPC · JPL
143418	2003 BA_{53}	—	January 27, 2003	Anderson Mesa	LONEOS	DOR	4.9 km	MPC · JPL
143419	2003 BQ_{53}	—	January 27, 2003	Anderson Mesa	LONEOS	HOF	5.1 km	MPC · JPL
143420	2003 BQ_{55}	—	January 28, 2003	Kitt Peak	Spacewatch	·	3.8 km	MPC · JPL
143421	2003 BG_{56}	—	January 28, 2003	Haleakala	NEAT	MRX	1.7 km	MPC · JPL
143422	2003 BJ_{56}	—	January 28, 2003	Haleakala	NEAT	VER	6.1 km	MPC · JPL
143423	2003 BL_{56}	—	January 28, 2003	Haleakala	NEAT	BRA	2.3 km	MPC · JPL
143424	2003 BB_{57}	—	January 27, 2003	Socorro	LINEAR	·	3.7 km	MPC · JPL
143425	2003 BG_{57}	—	January 27, 2003	Socorro	LINEAR	EOS	2.8 km	MPC · JPL
143426	2003 BR_{57}	—	January 27, 2003	Socorro	LINEAR	·	4.9 km	MPC · JPL
143427	2003 BF_{58}	—	January 27, 2003	Socorro	LINEAR	MAS	1.5 km	MPC · JPL
143428	2003 BV_{58}	—	January 27, 2003	Socorro	LINEAR	EMA	4.4 km	MPC · JPL
143429	2003 BW_{58}	—	January 27, 2003	Socorro	LINEAR	THM	4.5 km	MPC · JPL
143430	2003 BF_{60}	—	January 27, 2003	Socorro	LINEAR	(5)	2.6 km	MPC · JPL
143431	2003 BC_{62}	—	January 28, 2003	Palomar	NEAT	·	3.9 km	MPC · JPL
143432	2003 BU_{62}	—	January 28, 2003	Palomar	NEAT	·	6.1 km	MPC · JPL
143433	2003 BX_{62}	—	January 28, 2003	Palomar	NEAT	·	2.5 km	MPC · JPL
143434	2003 BY_{62}	—	January 28, 2003	Socorro	LINEAR	EOS	3.4 km	MPC · JPL
143435	2003 BD_{64}	—	January 29, 2003	Palomar	NEAT	ADE	4.9 km	MPC · JPL
143436	2003 BX_{66}	—	January 30, 2003	Anderson Mesa	LONEOS	·	3.8 km	MPC · JPL
143437	2003 BY_{66}	—	January 30, 2003	Anderson Mesa	LONEOS	·	5.3 km	MPC · JPL
143438	2003 BB_{67}	—	January 30, 2003	Haleakala	NEAT	·	4.2 km	MPC · JPL
143439	2003 BM_{67}	—	January 27, 2003	Anderson Mesa	LONEOS	·	3.3 km	MPC · JPL
143440	2003 BV_{70}	—	January 31, 2003	Kitt Peak	Spacewatch	THM	2.9 km	MPC · JPL
143441	2003 BM_{72}	—	January 28, 2003	Palomar	NEAT	VER	5.0 km	MPC · JPL
143442	2003 BK_{73}	—	January 29, 2003	Socorro	LINEAR	·	3.0 km	MPC · JPL
143443	2003 BV_{73}	—	January 29, 2003	Palomar	NEAT	·	4.8 km	MPC · JPL
143444	2003 BO_{74}	—	January 29, 2003	Palomar	NEAT	DOR	4.2 km	MPC · JPL
143445	2003 BV_{74}	—	January 29, 2003	Palomar	NEAT	·	3.7 km	MPC · JPL
143446	2003 BY_{75}	—	January 29, 2003	Palomar	NEAT	slow	5.7 km	MPC · JPL
143447	2003 BO_{78}	—	January 31, 2003	Socorro	LINEAR	TEL	2.2 km	MPC · JPL
143448	2003 BY_{78}	—	January 31, 2003	Palomar	NEAT	·	1.6 km	MPC · JPL
143449	2003 BG_{79}	—	January 31, 2003	Anderson Mesa	LONEOS	EOS	3.8 km	MPC · JPL
143450	2003 BU_{79}	—	January 31, 2003	Socorro	LINEAR	GEF ·	2.7 km	MPC · JPL
143451	2003 BR_{80}	—	January 31, 2003	Socorro	LINEAR	·	4.5 km	MPC · JPL
143452	2003 BX_{81}	—	January 31, 2003	Socorro	LINEAR	·	3.9 km	MPC · JPL
143453	2003 BO_{82}	—	January 31, 2003	Socorro	LINEAR	·	3.8 km	MPC · JPL
143454	2003 BB_{83}	—	January 31, 2003	Socorro	LINEAR	·	3.3 km	MPC · JPL
143455	2003 BL_{83}	—	January 31, 2003	Socorro	LINEAR	·	5.0 km	MPC · JPL
143456	2003 BU_{83}	—	January 31, 2003	Socorro	LINEAR	EOS	4.0 km	MPC · JPL
143457	2003 BM_{85}	—	January 31, 2003	Goodricke-Pigott	Kessel, J. W.	EOS	3.1 km	MPC · JPL
143458	2003 BF_{86}	—	January 24, 2003	La Silla	La Silla	·	4.5 km	MPC · JPL
143459	2003 BG_{88}	—	January 27, 2003	Socorro	LINEAR	·	5.4 km	MPC · JPL
143460	2003 BQ_{88}	—	January 27, 2003	Socorro	LINEAR	EUN	2.2 km	MPC · JPL
143461	2003 BK_{89}	—	January 28, 2003	Socorro	LINEAR	LUT	6.6 km	MPC · JPL
143462	2003 BN_{89}	—	January 28, 2003	Socorro	LINEAR	·	5.7 km	MPC · JPL
143463	2003 BG_{90}	—	January 28, 2003	Socorro	LINEAR	·	2.1 km	MPC · JPL
143464	2003 BB_{91}	—	January 31, 2003	Socorro	LINEAR	TIR	5.8 km	MPC · JPL
143465	2003 CT	—	February 1, 2003	Palomar	NEAT	EUN	4.9 km	MPC · JPL
143466	2003 CW_{2}	—	February 2, 2003	Socorro	LINEAR	BRA	3.6 km	MPC · JPL
143467	2003 CH_{3}	—	February 2, 2003	Socorro	LINEAR	·	2.5 km	MPC · JPL
143468	2003 CP_{3}	—	February 1, 2003	Palomar	NEAT	·	7.1 km	MPC · JPL
143469	2003 CZ_{3}	—	February 3, 2003	Palomar	NEAT	·	3.9 km	MPC · JPL
143470	2003 CZ_{4}	—	February 1, 2003	Socorro	LINEAR	NAE	5.8 km	MPC · JPL
143471	2003 CT_{5}	—	February 1, 2003	Socorro	LINEAR	EOS	3.6 km	MPC · JPL
143472	2003 CJ_{6}	—	February 1, 2003	Socorro	LINEAR	HYG	5.0 km	MPC · JPL
143473	2003 CR_{6}	—	February 1, 2003	Socorro	LINEAR	·	2.2 km	MPC · JPL
143474	2003 CX_{6}	—	February 1, 2003	Socorro	LINEAR	HYG	5.9 km	MPC · JPL
143475	2003 CB_{8}	—	February 1, 2003	Socorro	LINEAR	·	2.2 km	MPC · JPL
143476	2003 CB_{9}	—	February 2, 2003	Anderson Mesa	LONEOS	EOS	3.3 km	MPC · JPL
143477	2003 CC_{10}	—	February 2, 2003	Haleakala	NEAT	·	3.4 km	MPC · JPL
143478	2003 CJ_{10}	—	February 2, 2003	Socorro	LINEAR	·	2.3 km	MPC · JPL
143479	2003 CP_{10}	—	February 3, 2003	Palomar	NEAT	·	4.2 km	MPC · JPL
143480	2003 CU_{10}	—	February 3, 2003	Anderson Mesa	LONEOS	EOS	3.6 km	MPC · JPL
143481	2003 CB_{11}	—	February 3, 2003	Haleakala	NEAT	·	8.0 km	MPC · JPL
143482	2003 CU_{12}	—	February 2, 2003	Palomar	NEAT	·	3.7 km	MPC · JPL
143483	2003 CF_{13}	—	February 3, 2003	Palomar	NEAT	·	6.0 km	MPC · JPL
143484	2003 CY_{13}	—	February 3, 2003	Kitt Peak	Spacewatch	AGN	1.7 km	MPC · JPL
143485	2003 CV_{14}	—	February 3, 2003	Haleakala	NEAT	·	2.0 km	MPC · JPL
143486	2003 CJ_{15}	—	February 4, 2003	Anderson Mesa	LONEOS	LUT	9.4 km	MPC · JPL
143487	2003 CR_{20}	—	February 11, 2003	Haleakala	NEAT	APO · PHA	580 m	MPC · JPL
143488	2003 CX_{21}	—	February 3, 2003	Socorro	LINEAR	·	2.3 km	MPC · JPL
143489	2003 DS	—	February 21, 2003	Palomar	NEAT	EOS	3.1 km	MPC · JPL
143490	2003 DL_{3}	—	February 22, 2003	Palomar	NEAT	·	4.3 km	MPC · JPL
143491	2003 DO_{3}	—	February 22, 2003	Palomar	NEAT	·	4.7 km	MPC · JPL
143492	2003 DP_{4}	—	February 22, 2003	Kleť	Kleť	EOS	4.8 km	MPC · JPL
143493	2003 DF_{5}	—	February 19, 2003	Palomar	NEAT	·	3.6 km	MPC · JPL
143494	2003 DB_{8}	—	February 22, 2003	Palomar	NEAT	·	5.4 km	MPC · JPL
143495	2003 DW_{9}	—	February 24, 2003	Uccle	T. Pauwels	·	7.7 km	MPC · JPL
143496	2003 DU_{10}	—	February 26, 2003	Campo Imperatore	CINEOS	·	5.4 km	MPC · JPL
143497	2003 DB_{11}	—	February 23, 2003	Kitt Peak	Spacewatch	·	7.4 km	MPC · JPL
143498	2003 DJ_{12}	—	February 25, 2003	Campo Imperatore	CINEOS	THM	4.4 km	MPC · JPL
143499	2003 DQ_{12}	—	February 26, 2003	Campo Imperatore	CINEOS	·	6.0 km	MPC · JPL
143500	2003 DU_{13}	—	February 25, 2003	Haleakala	NEAT	EOS	3.1 km	MPC · JPL

== 143501–143600 ==
back to top

Designation			Discovery			Properties		Ref
Permanent	Provisional	Named after	Date	Site	Discoverer(s)	Category	Diam.	Ref
143501	2003 DY_{13}	—	February 26, 2003	Haleakala	NEAT	·	4.6 km	MPC · JPL
143502	2003 DS_{14}	—	February 25, 2003	Haleakala	NEAT	·	2.9 km	MPC · JPL
143503	2003 DC_{15}	—	February 26, 2003	Socorro	LINEAR	·	4.0 km	MPC · JPL
143504	2003 DL_{17}	—	February 22, 2003	Goodricke-Pigott	Kessel, J. W.	·	5.5 km	MPC · JPL
143505	2003 DM_{17}	—	February 22, 2003	Goodricke-Pigott	Kessel, J. W.	·	3.4 km	MPC · JPL
143506	2003 DO_{17}	—	February 22, 2003	Goodricke-Pigott	Kessel, J. W.	VER	6.0 km	MPC · JPL
143507	2003 DL_{20}	—	February 22, 2003	Palomar	NEAT	·	3.4 km	MPC · JPL
143508	2003 DJ_{22}	—	February 24, 2003	Needville	J. Dellinger, Dillon, W. G.	·	3.3 km	MPC · JPL
143509	2003 EG_{1}	—	March 5, 2003	Socorro	LINEAR	EOS ·	5.8 km	MPC · JPL
143510	2003 EN_{4}	—	March 6, 2003	Desert Eagle	W. K. Y. Yeung	·	2.7 km	MPC · JPL
143511	2003 EZ_{5}	—	March 6, 2003	Anderson Mesa	LONEOS	·	5.6 km	MPC · JPL
143512	2003 ED_{7}	—	March 6, 2003	Anderson Mesa	LONEOS	·	7.1 km	MPC · JPL
143513	2003 EH_{7}	—	March 6, 2003	Anderson Mesa	LONEOS	·	5.7 km	MPC · JPL
143514	2003 EN_{8}	—	March 6, 2003	Anderson Mesa	LONEOS	·	8.9 km	MPC · JPL
143515	2003 EX_{8}	—	March 6, 2003	Socorro	LINEAR	·	6.1 km	MPC · JPL
143516	2003 EP_{9}	—	March 6, 2003	Anderson Mesa	LONEOS	·	5.5 km	MPC · JPL
143517	2003 ES_{9}	—	March 6, 2003	Anderson Mesa	LONEOS	·	2.4 km	MPC · JPL
143518	2003 ED_{10}	—	March 6, 2003	Anderson Mesa	LONEOS	·	3.8 km	MPC · JPL
143519	2003 EV_{11}	—	March 6, 2003	Socorro	LINEAR	·	5.9 km	MPC · JPL
143520	2003 EJ_{12}	—	March 6, 2003	Socorro	LINEAR	·	4.5 km	MPC · JPL
143521	2003 EY_{12}	—	March 6, 2003	Socorro	LINEAR	·	4.0 km	MPC · JPL
143522	2003 EG_{13}	—	March 6, 2003	Palomar	NEAT	HYG	5.5 km	MPC · JPL
143523	2003 EH_{13}	—	March 6, 2003	Palomar	NEAT	EOS	4.5 km	MPC · JPL
143524	2003 ET_{13}	—	March 6, 2003	Palomar	NEAT	·	5.2 km	MPC · JPL
143525	2003 EZ_{14}	—	March 7, 2003	Socorro	LINEAR	·	5.2 km	MPC · JPL
143526	2003 EG_{15}	—	March 7, 2003	Socorro	LINEAR	·	4.5 km	MPC · JPL
143527	2003 EN_{16}	—	March 8, 2003	Kitt Peak	Spacewatch	AMO	660 m	MPC · JPL
143528	2003 ET_{18}	—	March 6, 2003	Anderson Mesa	LONEOS	·	4.8 km	MPC · JPL
143529	2003 EU_{18}	—	March 6, 2003	Anderson Mesa	LONEOS	VER	5.1 km	MPC · JPL
143530	2003 EE_{19}	—	March 6, 2003	Anderson Mesa	LONEOS	EOS	3.1 km	MPC · JPL
143531	2003 EC_{20}	—	March 6, 2003	Anderson Mesa	LONEOS	·	2.8 km	MPC · JPL
143532	2003 EK_{20}	—	March 6, 2003	Anderson Mesa	LONEOS	·	5.1 km	MPC · JPL
143533	2003 ER_{20}	—	March 6, 2003	Anderson Mesa	LONEOS	·	2.6 km	MPC · JPL
143534	2003 EC_{21}	—	March 6, 2003	Anderson Mesa	LONEOS	·	5.9 km	MPC · JPL
143535	2003 EZ_{22}	—	March 6, 2003	Socorro	LINEAR	THM	5.6 km	MPC · JPL
143536	2003 EZ_{23}	—	March 6, 2003	Socorro	LINEAR	·	4.5 km	MPC · JPL
143537	2003 EV_{24}	—	March 6, 2003	Socorro	LINEAR	·	3.3 km	MPC · JPL
143538	2003 EG_{25}	—	March 6, 2003	Anderson Mesa	LONEOS	EOS	3.7 km	MPC · JPL
143539	2003 EN_{25}	—	March 6, 2003	Anderson Mesa	LONEOS	·	5.0 km	MPC · JPL
143540	2003 ED_{27}	—	March 6, 2003	Anderson Mesa	LONEOS	·	3.1 km	MPC · JPL
143541	2003 EL_{27}	—	March 6, 2003	Socorro	LINEAR	·	8.7 km	MPC · JPL
143542	2003 EC_{30}	—	March 6, 2003	Palomar	NEAT	THM	4.1 km	MPC · JPL
143543	2003 EW_{30}	—	March 6, 2003	Palomar	NEAT	·	3.9 km	MPC · JPL
143544	2003 EX_{30}	—	March 6, 2003	Palomar	NEAT	EOS	3.1 km	MPC · JPL
143545	2003 EA_{31}	—	March 6, 2003	Palomar	NEAT	·	4.8 km	MPC · JPL
143546	2003 EG_{31}	—	March 6, 2003	Palomar	NEAT	·	4.4 km	MPC · JPL
143547	2003 ES_{31}	—	March 7, 2003	Socorro	LINEAR	·	6.0 km	MPC · JPL
143548	2003 ER_{35}	—	March 7, 2003	Socorro	LINEAR	·	2.5 km	MPC · JPL
143549	2003 EU_{36}	—	March 8, 2003	Anderson Mesa	LONEOS	·	3.9 km	MPC · JPL
143550	2003 EC_{37}	—	March 8, 2003	Anderson Mesa	LONEOS	EUN	3.2 km	MPC · JPL
143551	2003 EH_{37}	—	March 8, 2003	Anderson Mesa	LONEOS	TIR	3.4 km	MPC · JPL
143552	2003 ET_{37}	—	March 8, 2003	Anderson Mesa	LONEOS	·	3.4 km	MPC · JPL
143553	2003 EG_{38}	—	March 8, 2003	Anderson Mesa	LONEOS	·	10 km	MPC · JPL
143554	2003 ED_{39}	—	March 8, 2003	Socorro	LINEAR	·	2.4 km	MPC · JPL
143555	2003 EH_{39}	—	March 8, 2003	Socorro	LINEAR	ADE	3.9 km	MPC · JPL
143556	2003 ED_{40}	—	March 8, 2003	Kitt Peak	Spacewatch	HYG	3.8 km	MPC · JPL
143557	2003 ER_{40}	—	March 8, 2003	Anderson Mesa	LONEOS	TIR	5.9 km	MPC · JPL
143558	2003 ET_{42}	—	March 9, 2003	Kitt Peak	Spacewatch	·	8.5 km	MPC · JPL
143559	2003 ET_{43}	—	March 6, 2003	Socorro	LINEAR	·	1.8 km	MPC · JPL
143560	2003 EV_{44}	—	March 7, 2003	Anderson Mesa	LONEOS	EMA	5.2 km	MPC · JPL
143561	2003 EP_{45}	—	March 7, 2003	Socorro	LINEAR	AEO	1.7 km	MPC · JPL
143562	2003 EZ_{45}	—	March 7, 2003	Socorro	LINEAR	·	3.2 km	MPC · JPL
143563	2003 EQ_{46}	—	March 8, 2003	Anderson Mesa	LONEOS	·	4.1 km	MPC · JPL
143564	2003 ER_{47}	—	March 9, 2003	Anderson Mesa	LONEOS	·	5.5 km	MPC · JPL
143565	2003 EW_{48}	—	March 9, 2003	Socorro	LINEAR	·	3.9 km	MPC · JPL
143566	2003 EP_{51}	—	March 9, 2003	Socorro	LINEAR	THM	5.4 km	MPC · JPL
143567	2003 ET_{51}	—	March 10, 2003	Anderson Mesa	LONEOS	·	6.0 km	MPC · JPL
143568	2003 EX_{52}	—	March 8, 2003	Socorro	LINEAR	·	4.0 km	MPC · JPL
143569	2003 EB_{53}	—	March 8, 2003	Anderson Mesa	LONEOS	JUN	2.4 km	MPC · JPL
143570	2003 ER_{53}	—	March 9, 2003	Socorro	LINEAR	·	5.5 km	MPC · JPL
143571	2003 EX_{57}	—	March 9, 2003	Socorro	LINEAR	(18466)	4.5 km	MPC · JPL
143572	2003 ET_{58}	—	March 10, 2003	Socorro	LINEAR	·	7.0 km	MPC · JPL
143573	2003 EU_{58}	—	March 11, 2003	Palomar	NEAT	·	6.7 km	MPC · JPL
143574	2003 EC_{59}	—	March 11, 2003	Socorro	LINEAR	HNS	2.6 km	MPC · JPL
143575	2003 EB_{60}	—	March 12, 2003	Desert Moon	Stevens, B. L.	EOS	3.1 km	MPC · JPL
143576	2003 FS_{1}	—	March 24, 2003	Socorro	LINEAR	·	4.0 km	MPC · JPL
143577	2003 FG_{2}	—	March 23, 2003	Vicques	M. Ory	·	4.4 km	MPC · JPL
143578	2003 FA_{5}	—	March 24, 2003	Črni Vrh	Mikuž, H., Matičič, S.	·	7.5 km	MPC · JPL
143579 Dérimiksa	2003 FE_{7}	Dérimiksa	March 28, 2003	Piszkéstető	K. Sárneczky	NEM	3.9 km	MPC · JPL
143580	2003 FO_{9}	—	March 21, 2003	Haleakala	NEAT	·	4.0 km	MPC · JPL
143581	2003 FV_{12}	—	March 23, 2003	Kitt Peak	Spacewatch	·	6.1 km	MPC · JPL
143582	2003 FQ_{13}	—	March 23, 2003	Kitt Peak	Spacewatch	·	4.9 km	MPC · JPL
143583	2003 FY_{13}	—	March 23, 2003	Kitt Peak	Spacewatch	·	4.8 km	MPC · JPL
143584	2003 FS_{23}	—	March 23, 2003	Kitt Peak	Spacewatch	HYG	6.6 km	MPC · JPL
143585	2003 FF_{24}	—	March 23, 2003	Kitt Peak	Spacewatch	·	4.9 km	MPC · JPL
143586	2003 FD_{26}	—	March 24, 2003	Kitt Peak	Spacewatch	·	4.1 km	MPC · JPL
143587	2003 FY_{28}	—	March 24, 2003	Haleakala	NEAT	·	3.5 km	MPC · JPL
143588	2003 FN_{45}	—	March 24, 2003	Kitt Peak	Spacewatch	THM	3.7 km	MPC · JPL
143589	2003 FJ_{46}	—	March 24, 2003	Kitt Peak	Spacewatch	(5)	1.9 km	MPC · JPL
143590	2003 FU_{50}	—	March 25, 2003	Palomar	NEAT	·	5.0 km	MPC · JPL
143591	2003 FF_{51}	—	March 25, 2003	Palomar	NEAT	·	5.1 km	MPC · JPL
143592	2003 FS_{52}	—	March 25, 2003	Haleakala	NEAT	·	4.6 km	MPC · JPL
143593	2003 FG_{61}	—	March 26, 2003	Palomar	NEAT	·	5.1 km	MPC · JPL
143594	2003 FD_{62}	—	March 26, 2003	Kitt Peak	Spacewatch	·	4.2 km	MPC · JPL
143595	2003 FL_{62}	—	March 26, 2003	Palomar	NEAT	·	5.5 km	MPC · JPL
143596	2003 FN_{62}	—	March 26, 2003	Kitt Peak	Spacewatch	·	3.9 km	MPC · JPL
143597	2003 FZ_{65}	—	March 26, 2003	Kitt Peak	Spacewatch	·	1.5 km	MPC · JPL
143598	2003 FV_{75}	—	March 27, 2003	Palomar	NEAT	·	3.4 km	MPC · JPL
143599	2003 FM_{78}	—	March 27, 2003	Kitt Peak	Spacewatch	·	1.3 km	MPC · JPL
143600	2003 FW_{78}	—	March 27, 2003	Socorro	LINEAR	MIS	4.5 km	MPC · JPL

== 143601–143700 ==
back to top

Designation			Discovery			Properties		Ref
Permanent	Provisional	Named after	Date	Site	Discoverer(s)	Category	Diam.	Ref
143601	2003 FZ_{78}	—	March 27, 2003	Socorro	LINEAR	HYG	4.6 km	MPC · JPL
143602	2003 FW_{81}	—	March 27, 2003	Socorro	LINEAR	·	5.0 km	MPC · JPL
143603	2003 FM_{89}	—	March 29, 2003	Anderson Mesa	LONEOS	HYG	6.3 km	MPC · JPL
143604	2003 FK_{91}	—	March 29, 2003	Anderson Mesa	LONEOS	(5)	2.1 km	MPC · JPL
143605	2003 FP_{91}	—	March 29, 2003	Anderson Mesa	LONEOS	LUT	8.2 km	MPC · JPL
143606	2003 FZ_{92}	—	March 29, 2003	Anderson Mesa	LONEOS	·	6.3 km	MPC · JPL
143607	2003 FD_{94}	—	March 29, 2003	Anderson Mesa	LONEOS	·	8.2 km	MPC · JPL
143608	2003 FD_{112}	—	March 31, 2003	Socorro	LINEAR	·	4.9 km	MPC · JPL
143609	2003 FL_{114}	—	March 31, 2003	Socorro	LINEAR	THB	8.0 km	MPC · JPL
143610	2003 FA_{117}	—	March 24, 2003	Kitt Peak	Spacewatch	·	3.6 km	MPC · JPL
143611	2003 FP_{117}	—	March 25, 2003	Palomar	NEAT	·	4.0 km	MPC · JPL
143612	2003 FQ_{120}	—	March 24, 2003	Kitt Peak	Spacewatch	·	1.8 km	MPC · JPL
143613	2003 FD_{121}	—	March 25, 2003	Anderson Mesa	LONEOS	·	3.8 km	MPC · JPL
143614	2003 GO_{2}	—	April 1, 2003	Socorro	LINEAR	·	4.3 km	MPC · JPL
143615	2003 GK_{4}	—	April 1, 2003	Socorro	LINEAR	·	1.7 km	MPC · JPL
143616	2003 GA_{11}	—	April 1, 2003	Socorro	LINEAR	·	5.2 km	MPC · JPL
143617	2003 GH_{12}	—	April 1, 2003	Socorro	LINEAR	·	4.8 km	MPC · JPL
143618	2003 GQ_{28}	—	April 7, 2003	Uccle	T. Pauwels	·	4.5 km	MPC · JPL
143619	2003 GC_{49}	—	April 9, 2003	Kitt Peak	Spacewatch	·	4.5 km	MPC · JPL
143620	2003 GM_{50}	—	April 4, 2003	Haleakala	NEAT	URS	7.6 km	MPC · JPL
143621	2003 GE_{55}	—	April 4, 2003	Kitt Peak	Spacewatch	3:2 · SHU	8.3 km	MPC · JPL
143622 Robertbloch	2003 HG	Robertbloch	April 22, 2003	Vicques	M. Ory	V	940 m	MPC · JPL
143623	2003 HJ_{3}	—	April 24, 2003	Anderson Mesa	LONEOS	·	3.3 km	MPC · JPL
143624	2003 HM_{16}	—	April 27, 2003	Socorro	LINEAR	APO +1km	2.1 km	MPC · JPL
143625	2003 HJ_{26}	—	April 25, 2003	Anderson Mesa	LONEOS	·	8.4 km	MPC · JPL
143626 Sevialdo	2003 HU_{27}	Sevialdo	April 25, 2003	Campo Imperatore	CINEOS	·	4.5 km	MPC · JPL
143627	2003 HJ_{28}	—	April 26, 2003	Haleakala	NEAT	·	5.8 km	MPC · JPL
143628	2003 HG_{31}	—	April 26, 2003	Kitt Peak	Spacewatch	MAS	950 m	MPC · JPL
143629	2003 HS_{32}	—	April 29, 2003	Socorro	LINEAR	·	6.8 km	MPC · JPL
143630	2003 HA_{33}	—	April 29, 2003	Anderson Mesa	LONEOS	·	1.1 km	MPC · JPL
143631	2003 HS_{35}	—	April 27, 2003	Socorro	LINEAR	CYB	7.2 km	MPC · JPL
143632	2003 HA_{37}	—	April 26, 2003	Haleakala	NEAT	·	5.2 km	MPC · JPL
143633	2003 HX_{53}	—	April 22, 2003	Bergisch Gladbach	W. Bickel	THM	3.3 km	MPC · JPL
143634	2003 HR_{54}	—	April 24, 2003	Haleakala	NEAT	·	7.0 km	MPC · JPL
143635	2003 HU_{54}	—	April 24, 2003	Haleakala	NEAT	·	7.5 km	MPC · JPL
143636	2003 KO_{19}	—	May 30, 2003	Anderson Mesa	LONEOS	·	8.5 km	MPC · JPL
143637	2003 LP_{6}	—	June 12, 2003	Socorro	LINEAR	APO +1km	1.7 km	MPC · JPL
143638	2003 MU_{8}	—	June 28, 2003	Socorro	LINEAR	·	3.8 km	MPC · JPL
143639	2003 MK_{9}	—	June 30, 2003	Socorro	LINEAR	H	1.1 km	MPC · JPL
143640	2003 NR_{4}	—	July 5, 2003	Socorro	LINEAR	H	890 m	MPC · JPL
143641 Sapello	2003 NK_{5}	Sapello	July 5, 2003	Mount Graham	Ryan, W. H., Martinez, C. T.	·	1.1 km	MPC · JPL
143642	2003 NV_{6}	—	July 7, 2003	Reedy Creek	J. Broughton	·	3.1 km	MPC · JPL
143643	2003 NP_{7}	—	July 7, 2003	Palomar	NEAT	AMO	770 m	MPC · JPL
143644	2003 OE_{3}	—	July 23, 2003	Wise	Polishook, D.	NYS	1.9 km	MPC · JPL
143645	2003 OP_{4}	—	July 22, 2003	Haleakala	NEAT	EUP	8.8 km	MPC · JPL
143646	2003 OO_{7}	—	July 25, 2003	Palomar	NEAT	V	1.1 km	MPC · JPL
143647	2003 OZ_{13}	—	July 27, 2003	Haleakala	NEAT	H	1.1 km	MPC · JPL
143648	2003 QP_{17}	—	August 22, 2003	Palomar	NEAT	·	7.4 km	MPC · JPL
143649	2003 QQ_{47}	—	August 24, 2003	Socorro	LINEAR	APO +1km · PHA · moon	1.2 km	MPC · JPL
143650	2003 QZ_{61}	—	August 23, 2003	Socorro	LINEAR	·	2.5 km	MPC · JPL
143651	2003 QO_{104}	—	August 31, 2003	Haleakala	NEAT	AMO · APO +1km · PHA · slow	2.1 km	MPC · JPL
143652	2003 RW_{12}	—	September 14, 2003	Haleakala	NEAT	(5)	1.6 km	MPC · JPL
143653	2003 RT_{13}	—	September 15, 2003	Haleakala	NEAT	H	890 m	MPC · JPL
143654	2003 SH_{11}	—	September 17, 2003	Socorro	LINEAR	PHO	1.8 km	MPC · JPL
143655	2003 SE_{18}	—	September 16, 2003	Kitt Peak	Spacewatch	H	860 m	MPC · JPL
143656	2003 SJ_{39}	—	September 16, 2003	Palomar	NEAT	·	3.2 km	MPC · JPL
143657	2003 SA_{45}	—	September 16, 2003	Anderson Mesa	LONEOS	·	1.0 km	MPC · JPL
143658	2003 SB_{45}	—	September 16, 2003	Anderson Mesa	LONEOS	3:2	6.8 km	MPC · JPL
143659	2003 SR_{55}	—	September 16, 2003	Anderson Mesa	LONEOS	·	920 m	MPC · JPL
143660	2003 SJ_{70}	—	September 17, 2003	Kitt Peak	Spacewatch	·	920 m	MPC · JPL
143661	2003 SM_{73}	—	September 18, 2003	Kitt Peak	Spacewatch	·	1.2 km	MPC · JPL
143662	2003 SP_{84}	—	September 20, 2003	Socorro	LINEAR	H	920 m	MPC · JPL
143663	2003 SW_{88}	—	September 18, 2003	Anderson Mesa	LONEOS	H	910 m	MPC · JPL
143664	2003 SM_{93}	—	September 18, 2003	Kitt Peak	Spacewatch	·	3.4 km	MPC · JPL
143665	2003 SP_{98}	—	September 19, 2003	Kitt Peak	Spacewatch	·	2.7 km	MPC · JPL
143666	2003 SR_{109}	—	September 20, 2003	Kitt Peak	Spacewatch	·	1.5 km	MPC · JPL
143667	2003 SQ_{125}	—	September 19, 2003	Socorro	LINEAR	·	4.0 km	MPC · JPL
143668	2003 SF_{128}	—	September 20, 2003	Socorro	LINEAR	·	1.1 km	MPC · JPL
143669	2003 SO_{140}	—	September 19, 2003	Palomar	NEAT	H	1.0 km	MPC · JPL
143670	2003 SJ_{145}	—	September 20, 2003	Campo Imperatore	CINEOS	·	1.2 km	MPC · JPL
143671	2003 SW_{151}	—	September 18, 2003	Palomar	NEAT	·	6.2 km	MPC · JPL
143672	2003 SN_{155}	—	September 19, 2003	Anderson Mesa	LONEOS	·	1.2 km	MPC · JPL
143673	2003 SO_{195}	—	September 20, 2003	Palomar	NEAT	·	2.6 km	MPC · JPL
143674	2003 SB_{210}	—	September 25, 2003	Haleakala	NEAT	·	1.3 km	MPC · JPL
143675	2003 SJ_{214}	—	September 26, 2003	Desert Eagle	W. K. Y. Yeung	KOR	2.1 km	MPC · JPL
143676	2003 SK_{214}	—	September 26, 2003	Desert Eagle	W. K. Y. Yeung	·	1.1 km	MPC · JPL
143677	2003 SW_{220}	—	September 29, 2003	Desert Eagle	W. K. Y. Yeung	·	1.3 km	MPC · JPL
143678	2003 SA_{224}	—	September 30, 2003	Socorro	LINEAR	AMO +1km	1.9 km	MPC · JPL
143679	2003 SK_{236}	—	September 26, 2003	Socorro	LINEAR	KOR	2.1 km	MPC · JPL
143680	2003 SU_{242}	—	September 27, 2003	Kitt Peak	Spacewatch	·	2.0 km	MPC · JPL
143681	2003 SX_{255}	—	September 27, 2003	Kitt Peak	Spacewatch	·	950 m	MPC · JPL
143682	2003 SQ_{266}	—	September 29, 2003	Socorro	LINEAR	MAS	1.2 km	MPC · JPL
143683	2003 SV_{280}	—	September 18, 2003	Palomar	NEAT	·	1.4 km	MPC · JPL
143684	2003 SS_{293}	—	September 27, 2003	Socorro	LINEAR	·	980 m	MPC · JPL
143685	2003 SS_{317}	—	September 25, 2003	Mauna Kea	Mauna Kea	res · 3:4	90 km	MPC · JPL
143686	2003 TW_{11}	—	October 14, 2003	Anderson Mesa	LONEOS	V	1.1 km	MPC · JPL
143687	2003 TP_{18}	—	October 15, 2003	Anderson Mesa	LONEOS	·	1.3 km	MPC · JPL
143688	2003 TH_{30}	—	October 1, 2003	Kitt Peak	Spacewatch	·	730 m	MPC · JPL
143689	2003 UQ_{9}	—	October 19, 2003	Kitt Peak	Spacewatch	·	1.3 km	MPC · JPL
143690	2003 UK_{13}	—	October 16, 2003	Kitt Peak	Spacewatch	·	1.0 km	MPC · JPL
143691	2003 UQ_{15}	—	October 16, 2003	Anderson Mesa	LONEOS	·	1.4 km	MPC · JPL
143692	2003 UF_{20}	—	October 21, 2003	Socorro	LINEAR	·	1.4 km	MPC · JPL
143693	2003 UM_{21}	—	October 19, 2003	Anderson Mesa	LONEOS	·	1.2 km	MPC · JPL
143694	2003 UK_{24}	—	October 22, 2003	Kitt Peak	Spacewatch	·	1.5 km	MPC · JPL
143695	2003 UQ_{40}	—	October 16, 2003	Anderson Mesa	LONEOS	·	1.3 km	MPC · JPL
143696	2003 UU_{40}	—	October 16, 2003	Anderson Mesa	LONEOS	·	1.1 km	MPC · JPL
143697	2003 UP_{44}	—	October 18, 2003	Kitt Peak	Spacewatch	·	920 m	MPC · JPL
143698	2003 UB_{55}	—	October 18, 2003	Palomar	NEAT	·	1.4 km	MPC · JPL
143699	2003 UN_{55}	—	October 18, 2003	Palomar	NEAT	·	1.3 km	MPC · JPL
143700	2003 UF_{57}	—	October 26, 2003	Kvistaberg	Uppsala-DLR Asteroid Survey	·	1.0 km	MPC · JPL

== 143701–143800 ==
back to top

Designation			Discovery			Properties		Ref
Permanent	Provisional	Named after	Date	Site	Discoverer(s)	Category	Diam.	Ref
143701	2003 UV_{79}	—	October 19, 2003	Haleakala	NEAT	·	3.5 km	MPC · JPL
143702	2003 UG_{91}	—	October 20, 2003	Socorro	LINEAR	·	920 m	MPC · JPL
143703	2003 UQ_{101}	—	October 20, 2003	Socorro	LINEAR	·	1.2 km	MPC · JPL
143704	2003 UV_{109}	—	October 19, 2003	Palomar	NEAT	·	1.1 km	MPC · JPL
143705	2003 UR_{115}	—	October 20, 2003	Palomar	NEAT	V	1.8 km	MPC · JPL
143706	2003 UG_{117}	—	October 21, 2003	Socorro	LINEAR	·	1.8 km	MPC · JPL
143707	2003 UY_{117}	—	October 22, 2003	Kitt Peak	Spacewatch	res · 2:5	235 km	MPC · JPL
143708	2003 UV_{126}	—	October 20, 2003	Palomar	NEAT	·	6.1 km	MPC · JPL
143709	2003 UM_{132}	—	October 19, 2003	Palomar	NEAT	·	1.1 km	MPC · JPL
143710	2003 UG_{134}	—	October 20, 2003	Palomar	NEAT	·	1.1 km	MPC · JPL
143711	2003 UR_{136}	—	October 21, 2003	Socorro	LINEAR	KOR	2.2 km	MPC · JPL
143712	2003 UD_{142}	—	October 18, 2003	Anderson Mesa	LONEOS	·	3.6 km	MPC · JPL
143713	2003 UF_{143}	—	October 18, 2003	Anderson Mesa	LONEOS	·	1.5 km	MPC · JPL
143714	2003 UL_{158}	—	October 20, 2003	Kitt Peak	Spacewatch	·	1.2 km	MPC · JPL
143715	2003 UT_{158}	—	October 20, 2003	Kitt Peak	Spacewatch	·	1.3 km	MPC · JPL
143716	2003 UM_{164}	—	October 21, 2003	Socorro	LINEAR	·	1.4 km	MPC · JPL
143717	2003 UF_{165}	—	October 21, 2003	Palomar	NEAT	·	1.0 km	MPC · JPL
143718	2003 UX_{167}	—	October 22, 2003	Socorro	LINEAR	·	2.1 km	MPC · JPL
143719	2003 UU_{177}	—	October 21, 2003	Palomar	NEAT	PAD · slow	2.5 km	MPC · JPL
143720	2003 US_{182}	—	October 21, 2003	Palomar	NEAT	MAS	1.2 km	MPC · JPL
143721	2003 UB_{184}	—	October 21, 2003	Palomar	NEAT	·	1.1 km	MPC · JPL
143722	2003 UM_{188}	—	October 22, 2003	Socorro	LINEAR	·	1.2 km	MPC · JPL
143723	2003 UW_{199}	—	October 21, 2003	Socorro	LINEAR	·	4.9 km	MPC · JPL
143724	2003 UJ_{200}	—	October 21, 2003	Socorro	LINEAR	KOR	2.3 km	MPC · JPL
143725	2003 UX_{200}	—	October 21, 2003	Socorro	LINEAR	·	1.6 km	MPC · JPL
143726	2003 UG_{201}	—	October 21, 2003	Socorro	LINEAR	·	2.9 km	MPC · JPL
143727	2003 UB_{204}	—	October 21, 2003	Kitt Peak	Spacewatch	·	1.4 km	MPC · JPL
143728	2003 UE_{206}	—	October 22, 2003	Socorro	LINEAR	·	1.4 km	MPC · JPL
143729	2003 UX_{209}	—	October 23, 2003	Anderson Mesa	LONEOS	V	1.0 km	MPC · JPL
143730	2003 UJ_{211}	—	October 23, 2003	Kitt Peak	Spacewatch	(2076)	1.5 km	MPC · JPL
143731	2003 UH_{213}	—	October 23, 2003	Haleakala	NEAT	V · slow	1.0 km	MPC · JPL
143732	2003 UD_{217}	—	October 21, 2003	Socorro	LINEAR	·	940 m	MPC · JPL
143733	2003 UB_{220}	—	October 21, 2003	Socorro	LINEAR	·	1.9 km	MPC · JPL
143734	2003 UK_{222}	—	October 22, 2003	Socorro	LINEAR	·	1.3 km	MPC · JPL
143735	2003 US_{223}	—	October 22, 2003	Socorro	LINEAR	(2076)	1.4 km	MPC · JPL
143736	2003 UM_{226}	—	October 22, 2003	Kitt Peak	Spacewatch	·	1.3 km	MPC · JPL
143737	2003 UJ_{236}	—	October 22, 2003	Haleakala	NEAT	H	1.5 km	MPC · JPL
143738	2003 UK_{239}	—	October 24, 2003	Socorro	LINEAR	MRX	1.6 km	MPC · JPL
143739	2003 UB_{246}	—	October 24, 2003	Socorro	LINEAR	·	1.3 km	MPC · JPL
143740	2003 UF_{247}	—	October 24, 2003	Socorro	LINEAR	·	1.1 km	MPC · JPL
143741	2003 UX_{248}	—	October 25, 2003	Socorro	LINEAR	·	1.1 km	MPC · JPL
143742	2003 UZ_{250}	—	October 25, 2003	Socorro	LINEAR	·	1.1 km	MPC · JPL
143743	2003 UJ_{253}	—	October 27, 2003	Socorro	LINEAR	·	1.3 km	MPC · JPL
143744	2003 UD_{258}	—	October 25, 2003	Socorro	LINEAR	·	1.6 km	MPC · JPL
143745	2003 UC_{259}	—	October 25, 2003	Socorro	LINEAR	·	1.9 km	MPC · JPL
143746	2003 UD_{259}	—	October 25, 2003	Socorro	LINEAR	V	1.1 km	MPC · JPL
143747	2003 UQ_{259}	—	October 25, 2003	Socorro	LINEAR	·	2.0 km	MPC · JPL
143748	2003 UA_{262}	—	October 26, 2003	Kitt Peak	Spacewatch	·	1.6 km	MPC · JPL
143749	2003 UR_{266}	—	October 28, 2003	Socorro	LINEAR	·	980 m	MPC · JPL
143750 Shyamkumar	2003 UJ_{288}	Shyamkumar	October 23, 2003	Kitt Peak	M. W. Buie	·	3.3 km	MPC · JPL
143751	2003 US_{292}	—	October 24, 2003	Kitt Peak	M. W. Buie	res · 3:5	80 km	MPC · JPL
143752	2003 VJ_{1}	—	November 5, 2003	Socorro	LINEAR	PHO	2.0 km	MPC · JPL
143753	2003 VN_{8}	—	November 15, 2003	Palomar	NEAT	·	3.0 km	MPC · JPL
143754	2003 VB_{11}	—	November 15, 2003	Palomar	NEAT	·	1.4 km	MPC · JPL
143755	2003 VG_{11}	—	November 15, 2003	Palomar	NEAT	·	1.2 km	MPC · JPL
143756	2003 WF_{4}	—	November 16, 2003	Catalina	CSS	NYS	1.7 km	MPC · JPL
143757	2003 WX_{5}	—	November 18, 2003	Palomar	NEAT	·	1.4 km	MPC · JPL
143758	2003 WY_{10}	—	November 18, 2003	Palomar	NEAT	·	1.1 km	MPC · JPL
143759	2003 WC_{11}	—	November 18, 2003	Palomar	NEAT	(2076)	1.3 km	MPC · JPL
143760	2003 WX_{11}	—	November 18, 2003	Palomar	NEAT	·	1.2 km	MPC · JPL
143761	2003 WS_{22}	—	November 16, 2003	Catalina	CSS	·	1.5 km	MPC · JPL
143762	2003 WJ_{29}	—	November 18, 2003	Kitt Peak	Spacewatch	·	1.4 km	MPC · JPL
143763	2003 WQ_{29}	—	November 18, 2003	Kitt Peak	Spacewatch	V	1.2 km	MPC · JPL
143764	2003 WS_{30}	—	November 18, 2003	Kitt Peak	Spacewatch	V	1.2 km	MPC · JPL
143765	2003 WP_{31}	—	November 18, 2003	Palomar	NEAT	·	1.3 km	MPC · JPL
143766	2003 WZ_{33}	—	November 19, 2003	Kitt Peak	Spacewatch	·	3.6 km	MPC · JPL
143767	2003 WZ_{35}	—	November 19, 2003	Catalina	CSS	·	960 m	MPC · JPL
143768	2003 WH_{36}	—	November 19, 2003	Kitt Peak	Spacewatch	·	1.2 km	MPC · JPL
143769	2003 WM_{37}	—	November 19, 2003	Socorro	LINEAR	V	1.2 km	MPC · JPL
143770	2003 WR_{37}	—	November 19, 2003	Socorro	LINEAR	·	1.3 km	MPC · JPL
143771	2003 WS_{39}	—	November 19, 2003	Kitt Peak	Spacewatch	·	1.2 km	MPC · JPL
143772	2003 WF_{41}	—	November 19, 2003	Kitt Peak	Spacewatch	·	940 m	MPC · JPL
143773	2003 WY_{42}	—	November 16, 2003	Catalina	CSS	·	1.1 km	MPC · JPL
143774	2003 WF_{43}	—	November 18, 2003	Catalina	CSS	·	1.8 km	MPC · JPL
143775	2003 WR_{57}	—	November 18, 2003	Kitt Peak	Spacewatch	·	1.4 km	MPC · JPL
143776	2003 WG_{59}	—	November 18, 2003	Kitt Peak	Spacewatch	·	1.1 km	MPC · JPL
143777	2003 WL_{66}	—	November 19, 2003	Kitt Peak	Spacewatch	·	1.2 km	MPC · JPL
143778	2003 WG_{67}	—	November 19, 2003	Kitt Peak	Spacewatch	·	1.5 km	MPC · JPL
143779	2003 WN_{67}	—	November 19, 2003	Kitt Peak	Spacewatch	·	1.4 km	MPC · JPL
143780	2003 WT_{67}	—	November 19, 2003	Kitt Peak	Spacewatch	·	1.5 km	MPC · JPL
143781	2003 WE_{68}	—	November 19, 2003	Kitt Peak	Spacewatch	·	1.3 km	MPC · JPL
143782	2003 WU_{68}	—	November 19, 2003	Kitt Peak	Spacewatch	V	950 m	MPC · JPL
143783	2003 WC_{74}	—	November 20, 2003	Socorro	LINEAR	·	1.2 km	MPC · JPL
143784	2003 WU_{74}	—	November 20, 2003	Socorro	LINEAR	ADE	5.7 km	MPC · JPL
143785	2003 WR_{76}	—	November 19, 2003	Kitt Peak	Spacewatch	V	1.2 km	MPC · JPL
143786	2003 WZ_{90}	—	November 18, 2003	Kitt Peak	Spacewatch	·	890 m	MPC · JPL
143787	2003 WO_{91}	—	November 18, 2003	Palomar	NEAT	·	1.3 km	MPC · JPL
143788	2003 WL_{92}	—	November 18, 2003	Palomar	NEAT	·	1.2 km	MPC · JPL
143789	2003 WR_{92}	—	November 19, 2003	Anderson Mesa	LONEOS	·	1.3 km	MPC · JPL
143790	2003 WE_{96}	—	November 19, 2003	Anderson Mesa	LONEOS	·	1.2 km	MPC · JPL
143791	2003 WT_{103}	—	November 21, 2003	Socorro	LINEAR	·	1.2 km	MPC · JPL
143792	2003 WL_{104}	—	November 21, 2003	Socorro	LINEAR	·	940 m	MPC · JPL
143793	2003 WQ_{104}	—	November 21, 2003	Socorro	LINEAR	·	1.7 km	MPC · JPL
143794	2003 WY_{104}	—	November 21, 2003	Socorro	LINEAR	·	2.4 km	MPC · JPL
143795	2003 WO_{105}	—	November 21, 2003	Socorro	LINEAR	·	1.6 km	MPC · JPL
143796	2003 WP_{107}	—	November 23, 2003	Socorro	LINEAR	·	1.6 km	MPC · JPL
143797	2003 WA_{112}	—	November 20, 2003	Socorro	LINEAR	·	1.6 km	MPC · JPL
143798	2003 WC_{113}	—	November 20, 2003	Socorro	LINEAR	·	1.2 km	MPC · JPL
143799	2003 WJ_{113}	—	November 20, 2003	Socorro	LINEAR	3:2	8.1 km	MPC · JPL
143800	2003 WM_{115}	—	November 20, 2003	Socorro	LINEAR	·	1.3 km	MPC · JPL

== 143801–143900 ==
back to top

Designation			Discovery			Properties		Ref
Permanent	Provisional	Named after	Date	Site	Discoverer(s)	Category	Diam.	Ref
143801	2003 WR_{116}	—	November 20, 2003	Socorro	LINEAR	·	1.6 km	MPC · JPL
143802	2003 WV_{117}	—	November 20, 2003	Socorro	LINEAR	·	1.8 km	MPC · JPL
143803	2003 WA_{119}	—	November 20, 2003	Socorro	LINEAR	·	1.6 km	MPC · JPL
143804	2003 WE_{119}	—	November 20, 2003	Socorro	LINEAR	·	1.1 km	MPC · JPL
143805	2003 WZ_{122}	—	November 20, 2003	Socorro	LINEAR	·	1.5 km	MPC · JPL
143806	2003 WD_{123}	—	November 20, 2003	Socorro	LINEAR	·	1.6 km	MPC · JPL
143807	2003 WY_{126}	—	November 20, 2003	Socorro	LINEAR	·	1.4 km	MPC · JPL
143808	2003 WG_{127}	—	November 20, 2003	Socorro	LINEAR	·	1.5 km	MPC · JPL
143809	2003 WN_{127}	—	November 20, 2003	Socorro	LINEAR	·	1.3 km	MPC · JPL
143810	2003 WR_{127}	—	November 20, 2003	Socorro	LINEAR	EUN	3.2 km	MPC · JPL
143811	2003 WE_{130}	—	November 21, 2003	Socorro	LINEAR	·	1.0 km	MPC · JPL
143812	2003 WW_{131}	—	November 19, 2003	Anderson Mesa	LONEOS	·	1.6 km	MPC · JPL
143813	2003 WO_{136}	—	November 21, 2003	Socorro	LINEAR	·	1.7 km	MPC · JPL
143814	2003 WP_{136}	—	November 21, 2003	Socorro	LINEAR	·	1.3 km	MPC · JPL
143815	2003 WR_{136}	—	November 21, 2003	Socorro	LINEAR	·	1.6 km	MPC · JPL
143816	2003 WC_{137}	—	November 21, 2003	Socorro	LINEAR	·	1.9 km	MPC · JPL
143817	2003 WJ_{137}	—	November 21, 2003	Socorro	LINEAR	·	1.2 km	MPC · JPL
143818	2003 WF_{138}	—	November 21, 2003	Socorro	LINEAR	·	1.1 km	MPC · JPL
143819	2003 WJ_{138}	—	November 21, 2003	Socorro	LINEAR	·	1.9 km	MPC · JPL
143820	2003 WS_{139}	—	November 21, 2003	Socorro	LINEAR	·	1.2 km	MPC · JPL
143821	2003 WR_{141}	—	November 21, 2003	Socorro	LINEAR	·	1.4 km	MPC · JPL
143822	2003 WC_{142}	—	November 21, 2003	Socorro	LINEAR	·	4.0 km	MPC · JPL
143823	2003 WU_{142}	—	November 21, 2003	Socorro	LINEAR	·	2.1 km	MPC · JPL
143824	2003 WX_{145}	—	November 21, 2003	Socorro	LINEAR	·	970 m	MPC · JPL
143825	2003 WK_{147}	—	November 23, 2003	Kitt Peak	Spacewatch	·	1.3 km	MPC · JPL
143826	2003 WH_{148}	—	November 24, 2003	Anderson Mesa	LONEOS	·	1.5 km	MPC · JPL
143827	2003 WM_{150}	—	November 24, 2003	Anderson Mesa	LONEOS	·	1.7 km	MPC · JPL
143828	2003 WP_{150}	—	November 24, 2003	Anderson Mesa	LONEOS	·	1.6 km	MPC · JPL
143829	2003 WP_{151}	—	November 19, 2003	Socorro	LINEAR	·	1.3 km	MPC · JPL
143830	2003 WV_{152}	—	November 26, 2003	Socorro	LINEAR	PHO	2.0 km	MPC · JPL
143831	2003 WH_{157}	—	November 30, 2003	Socorro	LINEAR	·	1.3 km	MPC · JPL
143832	2003 WQ_{159}	—	November 29, 2003	Catalina	CSS	·	7.0 km	MPC · JPL
143833	2003 WB_{161}	—	November 30, 2003	Kitt Peak	Spacewatch	NYS	2.2 km	MPC · JPL
143834	2003 WV_{167}	—	November 19, 2003	Palomar	NEAT	·	1.2 km	MPC · JPL
143835	2003 WG_{181}	—	November 20, 2003	Socorro	LINEAR	·	1.3 km	MPC · JPL
143836	2003 XL_{1}	—	December 1, 2003	Kitt Peak	Spacewatch	·	1.4 km	MPC · JPL
143837	2003 XO_{7}	—	December 1, 2003	Socorro	LINEAR	·	1.7 km	MPC · JPL
143838	2003 XT_{7}	—	December 3, 2003	Socorro	LINEAR	V	1.1 km	MPC · JPL
143839	2003 XL_{16}	—	December 14, 2003	Palomar	NEAT	·	1.3 km	MPC · JPL
143840	2003 XA_{18}	—	December 14, 2003	Kitt Peak	Spacewatch	·	1.7 km	MPC · JPL
143841	2003 XN_{20}	—	December 14, 2003	Kitt Peak	Spacewatch	·	1.2 km	MPC · JPL
143842	2003 XY_{24}	—	December 1, 2003	Socorro	LINEAR	·	1.1 km	MPC · JPL
143843	2003 XG_{36}	—	December 3, 2003	Socorro	LINEAR	·	1.5 km	MPC · JPL
143844	2003 XW_{37}	—	December 4, 2003	Socorro	LINEAR	·	1.2 km	MPC · JPL
143845	2003 XT_{38}	—	December 4, 2003	Socorro	LINEAR	·	1.3 km	MPC · JPL
143846	2003 YA_{3}	—	December 16, 2003	Anderson Mesa	LONEOS	·	1.3 km	MPC · JPL
143847	2003 YO_{4}	—	December 17, 2003	Kitt Peak	Spacewatch	·	1.4 km	MPC · JPL
143848	2003 YZ_{5}	—	December 16, 2003	Anderson Mesa	LONEOS	·	3.3 km	MPC · JPL
143849	2003 YG_{6}	—	December 17, 2003	Socorro	LINEAR	·	1.6 km	MPC · JPL
143850	2003 YV_{6}	—	December 17, 2003	Socorro	LINEAR	(2076)	1.4 km	MPC · JPL
143851	2003 YK_{7}	—	December 17, 2003	Palomar	NEAT	·	1.6 km	MPC · JPL
143852	2003 YR_{7}	—	December 20, 2003	Nashville	Clingan, R.	·	1.7 km	MPC · JPL
143853	2003 YX_{7}	—	December 20, 2003	Socorro	LINEAR	·	2.0 km	MPC · JPL
143854	2003 YT_{8}	—	December 19, 2003	Socorro	LINEAR	·	1.2 km	MPC · JPL
143855	2003 YC_{9}	—	December 20, 2003	Socorro	LINEAR	·	1.6 km	MPC · JPL
143856	2003 YN_{10}	—	December 17, 2003	Socorro	LINEAR	·	1.6 km	MPC · JPL
143857	2003 YU_{11}	—	December 17, 2003	Socorro	LINEAR	·	1.7 km	MPC · JPL
143858	2003 YH_{12}	—	December 17, 2003	Socorro	LINEAR	EUN	5.3 km	MPC · JPL
143859	2003 YD_{13}	—	December 17, 2003	Anderson Mesa	LONEOS	·	2.1 km	MPC · JPL
143860	2003 YL_{13}	—	December 17, 2003	Anderson Mesa	LONEOS	·	1.3 km	MPC · JPL
143861	2003 YP_{13}	—	December 17, 2003	Catalina	CSS	ERI	3.5 km	MPC · JPL
143862	2003 YW_{13}	—	December 17, 2003	Catalina	CSS	·	1.5 km	MPC · JPL
143863	2003 YC_{15}	—	December 17, 2003	Socorro	LINEAR	V	1.3 km	MPC · JPL
143864	2003 YN_{15}	—	December 17, 2003	Socorro	LINEAR	·	1.8 km	MPC · JPL
143865	2003 YG_{16}	—	December 17, 2003	Anderson Mesa	LONEOS	·	1.7 km	MPC · JPL
143866	2003 YH_{16}	—	December 17, 2003	Anderson Mesa	LONEOS	·	1.4 km	MPC · JPL
143867	2003 YZ_{16}	—	December 17, 2003	Palomar	NEAT	·	3.3 km	MPC · JPL
143868	2003 YA_{18}	—	December 16, 2003	Anderson Mesa	LONEOS	·	2.1 km	MPC · JPL
143869	2003 YM_{20}	—	December 17, 2003	Kitt Peak	Spacewatch	·	1.9 km	MPC · JPL
143870	2003 YO_{22}	—	December 18, 2003	Socorro	LINEAR	·	1.4 km	MPC · JPL
143871	2003 YK_{23}	—	December 17, 2003	Socorro	LINEAR	V	990 m	MPC · JPL
143872	2003 YU_{23}	—	December 17, 2003	Anderson Mesa	LONEOS	V	910 m	MPC · JPL
143873	2003 YC_{24}	—	December 17, 2003	Socorro	LINEAR	ADE	4.3 km	MPC · JPL
143874	2003 YO_{24}	—	December 17, 2003	Kitt Peak	Spacewatch	V	1.2 km	MPC · JPL
143875	2003 YR_{24}	—	December 17, 2003	Kitt Peak	Spacewatch	·	1.7 km	MPC · JPL
143876	2003 YE_{26}	—	December 18, 2003	Socorro	LINEAR	·	1.9 km	MPC · JPL
143877	2003 YF_{26}	—	December 18, 2003	Socorro	LINEAR	·	1.4 km	MPC · JPL
143878	2003 YG_{27}	—	December 16, 2003	Črni Vrh	Mikuž, H.	·	1.7 km	MPC · JPL
143879	2003 YV_{27}	—	December 17, 2003	Socorro	LINEAR	·	2.4 km	MPC · JPL
143880	2003 YZ_{28}	—	December 17, 2003	Palomar	NEAT	·	1.3 km	MPC · JPL
143881	2003 YO_{29}	—	December 17, 2003	Kitt Peak	Spacewatch	NYS	1.9 km	MPC · JPL
143882	2003 YP_{29}	—	December 17, 2003	Kitt Peak	Spacewatch	·	1.2 km	MPC · JPL
143883	2003 YB_{32}	—	December 18, 2003	Kitt Peak	Spacewatch	·	1.8 km	MPC · JPL
143884	2003 YD_{34}	—	December 17, 2003	Kitt Peak	Spacewatch	·	1.3 km	MPC · JPL
143885	2003 YW_{34}	—	December 18, 2003	Socorro	LINEAR	·	1.5 km	MPC · JPL
143886	2003 YE_{35}	—	December 18, 2003	Haleakala	NEAT	·	1.9 km	MPC · JPL
143887	2003 YJ_{36}	—	December 18, 2003	Socorro	LINEAR	·	1.2 km	MPC · JPL
143888	2003 YL_{40}	—	December 19, 2003	Kitt Peak	Spacewatch	·	2.2 km	MPC · JPL
143889	2003 YR_{40}	—	December 19, 2003	Kitt Peak	Spacewatch	·	2.3 km	MPC · JPL
143890	2003 YE_{43}	—	December 19, 2003	Kitt Peak	Spacewatch	·	2.1 km	MPC · JPL
143891	2003 YP_{43}	—	December 19, 2003	Socorro	LINEAR	NYS	1.9 km	MPC · JPL
143892	2003 YU_{43}	—	December 19, 2003	Socorro	LINEAR	·	1.9 km	MPC · JPL
143893	2003 YS_{44}	—	December 19, 2003	Kitt Peak	Spacewatch	·	1.9 km	MPC · JPL
143894	2003 YT_{45}	—	December 17, 2003	Socorro	LINEAR	·	1.5 km	MPC · JPL
143895	2003 YY_{50}	—	December 18, 2003	Socorro	LINEAR	·	2.1 km	MPC · JPL
143896	2003 YN_{55}	—	December 19, 2003	Socorro	LINEAR	·	1.8 km	MPC · JPL
143897	2003 YV_{55}	—	December 19, 2003	Socorro	LINEAR	·	2.4 km	MPC · JPL
143898	2003 YG_{56}	—	December 19, 2003	Socorro	LINEAR	V	1.2 km	MPC · JPL
143899	2003 YK_{56}	—	December 19, 2003	Socorro	LINEAR	NYS	2.1 km	MPC · JPL
143900	2003 YJ_{58}	—	December 19, 2003	Socorro	LINEAR	·	4.0 km	MPC · JPL

== 143901–144000 ==
back to top

Designation			Discovery			Properties		Ref
Permanent	Provisional	Named after	Date	Site	Discoverer(s)	Category	Diam.	Ref
143901	2003 YR_{60}	—	December 19, 2003	Kitt Peak	Spacewatch	·	1.6 km	MPC · JPL
143902	2003 YR_{61}	—	December 19, 2003	Socorro	LINEAR	V	1.3 km	MPC · JPL
143903	2003 YZ_{61}	—	December 19, 2003	Socorro	LINEAR	·	1.5 km	MPC · JPL
143904	2003 YM_{62}	—	December 19, 2003	Socorro	LINEAR	·	1.8 km	MPC · JPL
143905	2003 YS_{62}	—	December 19, 2003	Socorro	LINEAR	·	2.1 km	MPC · JPL
143906	2003 YW_{62}	—	December 19, 2003	Socorro	LINEAR	·	1.8 km	MPC · JPL
143907	2003 YV_{63}	—	December 19, 2003	Socorro	LINEAR	V	1.2 km	MPC · JPL
143908	2003 YR_{65}	—	December 19, 2003	Socorro	LINEAR	V	1.1 km	MPC · JPL
143909	2003 YS_{66}	—	December 20, 2003	Socorro	LINEAR	ERI	2.5 km	MPC · JPL
143910	2003 YD_{69}	—	December 20, 2003	Socorro	LINEAR	·	1.3 km	MPC · JPL
143911	2003 YJ_{69}	—	December 20, 2003	Socorro	LINEAR	·	2.9 km	MPC · JPL
143912	2003 YN_{70}	—	December 19, 2003	Socorro	LINEAR	·	1.3 km	MPC · JPL
143913	2003 YF_{74}	—	December 18, 2003	Socorro	LINEAR	NYS	2.4 km	MPC · JPL
143914	2003 YA_{75}	—	December 18, 2003	Socorro	LINEAR	·	1.4 km	MPC · JPL
143915	2003 YC_{79}	—	December 18, 2003	Socorro	LINEAR	NYS	2.1 km	MPC · JPL
143916	2003 YE_{79}	—	December 18, 2003	Socorro	LINEAR	·	1.5 km	MPC · JPL
143917	2003 YN_{79}	—	December 18, 2003	Socorro	LINEAR	·	2.9 km	MPC · JPL
143918	2003 YP_{79}	—	December 18, 2003	Socorro	LINEAR	·	1.7 km	MPC · JPL
143919	2003 YW_{80}	—	December 18, 2003	Socorro	LINEAR	·	3.2 km	MPC · JPL
143920	2003 YF_{82}	—	December 18, 2003	Socorro	LINEAR	·	1.1 km	MPC · JPL
143921	2003 YW_{85}	—	December 19, 2003	Socorro	LINEAR	V	1.1 km	MPC · JPL
143922	2003 YU_{87}	—	December 19, 2003	Socorro	LINEAR	V	1.1 km	MPC · JPL
143923	2003 YE_{89}	—	December 19, 2003	Socorro	LINEAR	·	3.8 km	MPC · JPL
143924	2003 YH_{89}	—	December 19, 2003	Socorro	LINEAR	·	2.2 km	MPC · JPL
143925	2003 YO_{89}	—	December 19, 2003	Socorro	LINEAR	·	3.1 km	MPC · JPL
143926	2003 YX_{89}	—	December 19, 2003	Kitt Peak	Spacewatch	·	2.5 km	MPC · JPL
143927	2003 YE_{90}	—	December 19, 2003	Kitt Peak	Spacewatch	·	2.2 km	MPC · JPL
143928	2003 YU_{90}	—	December 20, 2003	Socorro	LINEAR	·	1.4 km	MPC · JPL
143929	2003 YP_{91}	—	December 20, 2003	Socorro	LINEAR	·	1.2 km	MPC · JPL
143930	2003 YP_{98}	—	December 19, 2003	Kitt Peak	Spacewatch	·	1.5 km	MPC · JPL
143931	2003 YD_{102}	—	December 19, 2003	Socorro	LINEAR	·	1.7 km	MPC · JPL
143932	2003 YF_{102}	—	December 19, 2003	Socorro	LINEAR	·	2.2 km	MPC · JPL
143933	2003 YC_{104}	—	December 21, 2003	Socorro	LINEAR	·	1.0 km	MPC · JPL
143934	2003 YD_{105}	—	December 21, 2003	Socorro	LINEAR	·	1.9 km	MPC · JPL
143935	2003 YE_{105}	—	December 22, 2003	Socorro	LINEAR	·	1.2 km	MPC · JPL
143936	2003 YR_{105}	—	December 22, 2003	Socorro	LINEAR	·	1.7 km	MPC · JPL
143937	2003 YK_{106}	—	December 22, 2003	Socorro	LINEAR	V	1.2 km	MPC · JPL
143938	2003 YV_{106}	—	December 22, 2003	Catalina	CSS	·	1.4 km	MPC · JPL
143939	2003 YC_{107}	—	December 22, 2003	Kitt Peak	Spacewatch	·	1.4 km	MPC · JPL
143940	2003 YW_{113}	—	December 24, 2003	Socorro	LINEAR	·	1.1 km	MPC · JPL
143941	2003 YE_{115}	—	December 27, 2003	Socorro	LINEAR	·	1.1 km	MPC · JPL
143942	2003 YF_{115}	—	December 27, 2003	Socorro	LINEAR	·	1.3 km	MPC · JPL
143943	2003 YH_{115}	—	December 27, 2003	Socorro	LINEAR	·	2.3 km	MPC · JPL
143944	2003 YP_{115}	—	December 27, 2003	Socorro	LINEAR	·	1.6 km	MPC · JPL
143945	2003 YZ_{115}	—	December 27, 2003	Socorro	LINEAR	·	2.1 km	MPC · JPL
143946	2003 YB_{117}	—	December 27, 2003	Socorro	LINEAR	V	1.1 km	MPC · JPL
143947	2003 YQ_{117}	—	December 26, 2003	Haleakala	NEAT	APO +1km	3.0 km	MPC · JPL
143948	2003 YJ_{118}	—	December 23, 2003	Socorro	LINEAR	·	1.3 km	MPC · JPL
143949	2003 YO_{119}	—	December 27, 2003	Socorro	LINEAR	·	1.3 km	MPC · JPL
143950	2003 YR_{120}	—	December 27, 2003	Socorro	LINEAR	V	1.2 km	MPC · JPL
143951	2003 YC_{121}	—	December 27, 2003	Socorro	LINEAR	V	1.1 km	MPC · JPL
143952	2003 YL_{121}	—	December 28, 2003	Socorro	LINEAR	·	1.3 km	MPC · JPL
143953	2003 YL_{122}	—	December 27, 2003	Kitt Peak	Spacewatch	·	1.2 km	MPC · JPL
143954	2003 YY_{122}	—	December 27, 2003	Socorro	LINEAR	·	2.7 km	MPC · JPL
143955	2003 YC_{123}	—	December 27, 2003	Socorro	LINEAR	NYS	1.9 km	MPC · JPL
143956	2003 YL_{123}	—	December 27, 2003	Haleakala	NEAT	NYS	1.7 km	MPC · JPL
143957	2003 YB_{125}	—	December 27, 2003	Socorro	LINEAR	·	2.4 km	MPC · JPL
143958	2003 YD_{126}	—	December 27, 2003	Socorro	LINEAR	·	1.5 km	MPC · JPL
143959	2003 YG_{126}	—	December 27, 2003	Socorro	LINEAR	·	1.1 km	MPC · JPL
143960	2003 YX_{126}	—	December 27, 2003	Socorro	LINEAR	·	1.5 km	MPC · JPL
143961	2003 YU_{128}	—	December 27, 2003	Socorro	LINEAR	·	2.6 km	MPC · JPL
143962	2003 YT_{129}	—	December 27, 2003	Socorro	LINEAR	V	1.1 km	MPC · JPL
143963	2003 YA_{130}	—	December 27, 2003	Socorro	LINEAR	·	2.6 km	MPC · JPL
143964	2003 YD_{130}	—	December 27, 2003	Socorro	LINEAR	V	1.5 km	MPC · JPL
143965	2003 YC_{133}	—	December 28, 2003	Socorro	LINEAR	V	1.2 km	MPC · JPL
143966	2003 YE_{133}	—	December 28, 2003	Socorro	LINEAR	·	1.4 km	MPC · JPL
143967	2003 YR_{134}	—	December 28, 2003	Socorro	LINEAR	·	2.4 km	MPC · JPL
143968	2003 YN_{136}	—	December 17, 2003	Kitt Peak	Spacewatch	·	3.0 km	MPC · JPL
143969	2003 YS_{136}	—	December 18, 2003	Palomar	NEAT	·	1.3 km	MPC · JPL
143970	2003 YJ_{138}	—	December 27, 2003	Socorro	LINEAR	·	2.5 km	MPC · JPL
143971	2003 YV_{138}	—	December 27, 2003	Socorro	LINEAR	·	3.5 km	MPC · JPL
143972	2003 YK_{142}	—	December 28, 2003	Socorro	LINEAR	EUN	2.2 km	MPC · JPL
143973	2003 YP_{142}	—	December 28, 2003	Kitt Peak	Spacewatch	·	1.8 km	MPC · JPL
143974	2003 YA_{143}	—	December 28, 2003	Socorro	LINEAR	·	5.5 km	MPC · JPL
143975	2003 YP_{143}	—	December 28, 2003	Socorro	LINEAR	EUN	2.3 km	MPC · JPL
143976	2003 YG_{144}	—	December 28, 2003	Socorro	LINEAR	·	1.2 km	MPC · JPL
143977	2003 YM_{145}	—	December 28, 2003	Socorro	LINEAR	·	2.4 km	MPC · JPL
143978	2003 YS_{145}	—	December 28, 2003	Socorro	LINEAR	·	3.9 km	MPC · JPL
143979	2003 YF_{146}	—	December 28, 2003	Socorro	LINEAR	·	2.9 km	MPC · JPL
143980	2003 YT_{148}	—	December 29, 2003	Socorro	LINEAR	EUN	2.0 km	MPC · JPL
143981	2003 YH_{150}	—	December 29, 2003	Socorro	LINEAR	·	1.2 km	MPC · JPL
143982	2003 YK_{150}	—	December 29, 2003	Anderson Mesa	LONEOS	·	1.4 km	MPC · JPL
143983	2003 YE_{152}	—	December 29, 2003	Socorro	LINEAR	·	3.3 km	MPC · JPL
143984	2003 YZ_{152}	—	December 29, 2003	Catalina	CSS	EUN	2.5 km	MPC · JPL
143985	2003 YT_{153}	—	December 29, 2003	Catalina	CSS	·	5.1 km	MPC · JPL
143986	2003 YB_{154}	—	December 29, 2003	Catalina	CSS	EUN	2.1 km	MPC · JPL
143987	2003 YS_{154}	—	December 29, 2003	Socorro	LINEAR	·	3.9 km	MPC · JPL
143988	2003 YT_{154}	—	December 29, 2003	Socorro	LINEAR	(194)	4.0 km	MPC · JPL
143989	2003 YY_{158}	—	December 17, 2003	Socorro	LINEAR	·	2.1 km	MPC · JPL
143990	2003 YN_{175}	—	December 19, 2003	Kitt Peak	Spacewatch	·	2.0 km	MPC · JPL
143991	2003 YO_{179}	—	December 17, 2003	Mauna Kea	Mauna Kea	cubewano (hot)	352 km	MPC · JPL
143992	2004 AF	—	January 5, 2004	Socorro	LINEAR	APO +1km · PHA	2.1 km	MPC · JPL
143993	2004 AG_{2}	—	January 13, 2004	Anderson Mesa	LONEOS	·	2.1 km	MPC · JPL
143994	2004 AU_{2}	—	January 13, 2004	Anderson Mesa	LONEOS	·	1.9 km	MPC · JPL
143995	2004 AJ_{3}	—	January 13, 2004	Anderson Mesa	LONEOS	·	2.2 km	MPC · JPL
143996	2004 AN_{3}	—	January 13, 2004	Anderson Mesa	LONEOS	·	1.2 km	MPC · JPL
143997	2004 AU_{3}	—	January 13, 2004	Anderson Mesa	LONEOS	·	1.9 km	MPC · JPL
143998	2004 AQ_{4}	—	January 12, 2004	Palomar	NEAT	·	1.3 km	MPC · JPL
143999	2004 AR_{4}	—	January 12, 2004	Palomar	NEAT	·	3.0 km	MPC · JPL
144000	2004 AV_{4}	—	January 12, 2004	Palomar	NEAT	·	1.4 km	MPC · JPL

back to top

== See also ==
- Meanings of minor-planet names: 143001–144000
