= Meanings of minor-planet names: 143001–144000 =

As minor planet discoveries are confirmed, they are given a permanent number by the IAU's Minor Planet Center (MPC), and the discoverers can then submit names for them, following the IAU's naming conventions. The list below concerns those minor planets in the specified number-range that have received names, and explains the meanings of those names.

Official naming citations of newly named small Solar System bodies are approved and published in a bulletin by IAU's Working Group for Small Bodies Nomenclature (WGSBN). Before May 2021, citations were published in MPC's Minor Planet Circulars for many decades. Recent citations can also be found on the JPL Small-Body Database (SBDB). Until his death in 2016, German astronomer Lutz D. Schmadel compiled these citations into the Dictionary of Minor Planet Names (DMP) and regularly updated the collection.

Based on Paul Herget's The Names of the Minor Planets, Schmadel also researched the unclear origin of numerous asteroids, most of which had been named prior to World War II. This article incorporates text from this source, which is in the public domain: SBDB New namings may only be added to this list below after official publication as the preannouncement of names is condemned. The WGSBN publishes a comprehensive guideline for the naming rules of non-cometary small Solar System bodies.

== 143001–143100 ==
Named minor planet	Provisional	This minor planet was named for...	Ref · Catalog
143048 Margaretpenston	2002 VR_{132}	Margaret Penston (born 1941), the past president of the Society for Popular Astronomy based in the United Kingdom	JPL · 143048

== 143101–143200 ==
back to top

Named minor planet	Provisional	This minor planet was named for...	Ref · Catalog
143139 Kučáková	2002 XC_{39}	Hana Kučáková (b. 1981), a Czech astronomer.	IAU · 143139

== 143201–143300 ==
back to top

Named minor planet	Provisional	This minor planet was named for...	Ref · Catalog
There are no named minor planets in this number range

== 143301–143400 ==
back to top

Named minor planet	Provisional	This minor planet was named for...	Ref · Catalog
There are no named minor planets in this number range

== 143401–143500 ==
back to top

Named minor planet	Provisional	This minor planet was named for...	Ref · Catalog
There are no named minor planets in this number range

== 143501–143600 ==
back to top

Named minor planet	Provisional	This minor planet was named for...	Ref · Catalog
143579 Dérimiksa	2003 FE_{7}	Miksa Déri (1854–1938), a Hungarian electrical engineer.	JPL · 143579

== 143601–143700 ==
back to top

Named minor planet	Provisional	This minor planet was named for...	Ref · Catalog
143622 Robertbloch	2003 HG	Robert Bloch (1922–1994), a Swiss art, literature and music benefactor, founder of the "Fondation Anne et Robert Bloch"	JPL · 143622
143626 Sevialdo	2003 HU_{27}	Aldo Sevi, Italian amateur astronomer who was one of the first members of the Gruppo Astrofili Montelupo.	JPL · 143626
143641 Sapello	2003 NK_{5}	Sapello, New Mexico	JPL · 143641

== 143701–143800 ==
back to top

Named minor planet	Provisional	This minor planet was named for...	Ref · Catalog
143750 Shyamkumar	2003 UJ_{288}	Shyamkumar Bhaskaran (b. 1963), an American navigation specialist at the Jet Propulsion Laboratory.	IAU · 143750

== 143801–143900 ==
back to top

Named minor planet	Provisional	This minor planet was named for...	Ref · Catalog
There are no named minor planets in this number range

== 143901–144000 ==
back to top

Named minor planet	Provisional	This minor planet was named for...	Ref · Catalog
There are no named minor planets in this number range

back to top

Preceded by 142,001–143,000	Meanings of minor-planet names List of minor planets: 143,001–144,000	Succeeded by 144,001–145,000
