= (143649) 2003 QQ47 =

Asteroid

(143649) 2003 QQ_{47}
Discovery
- Discovered by: LINEAR
- Discovery site: Lincoln Lab's ETS
- Discovery date: 24 August 2003

Designations
- Minor planet category: NEO; PHA; APO

Orbital characteristics
- Epoch 13 January 2016 (JD 2457400.5)
- Uncertainty parameter 0
- Observation arc: 4285 days (11.73 yr)
- Aphelion: 1.28834 AU (192.733 Gm)
- Perihelion: 0.882430 AU (132.0096 Gm)
- Semi-major axis: 1.08538 AU (162.371 Gm)
- Eccentricity: 0.18699
- Orbital period (sidereal): 1.13 yr (413.02 d)
- Average orbital speed: 28.34 km/s
- Mean anomaly: 264.755°
- Mean motion: 0° 52^{m} 17.846^{s} / day
- Inclination: 62.1021°
- Longitude of ascending node: 0.997990°
- Argument of perihelion: 104.999°
- Known satellites: S/2021 (143649) 1
- Earth MOID: 0.00253637 AU (379,436 km)

Physical characteristics
- Mean diameter: 0.995±0.42 km (system); 0.94±0.40 km (primary); 0.31±0.13 km (secondary)
- Mass: 2.0×10^{12} kg
- Synodic rotation period: 2.6446±0.0007 h
- Absolute magnitude (H): 17.4

(143649) 2003 QQ_{47} is a kilometer-sized asteroid and synchronous binary system, classified as a near-Earth object and potentially hazardous asteroid of the Apollo group. It became briefly notable upon its discovery in late August 2003, when media outlets played up a very preliminary report that it had a 1 in 250,000 chance of impacting into Earth on 21 March 2014. The discovery of a companion, approximately 310 meters (1,000 ft) in diameter, was announced in September 2021.

== Description ==
2003 QQ_{47} was discovered on 24 August 2003. It was added to the Sentry Risk Table on 30 August 2003. By 31 August 2003 (with an observation arc of 7 days) the odds of an impact on 21 March 2014 were already reduced to 1 in 1.7 million. The asteroid was removed from the Sentry Risk Table on 14 September 2003, indicating there is no risk of an impact by it in the next 100 years.

2003 QQ_{47} safely passed within 0.1283 AU (19,190,000 km; 11,930,000 mi) of Earth on 26 March 2014. With an observation arc of 10 years and an orbital uncertainty of 0, its orbit and future close approaches are well-determined.

== Preliminary reports ==
On 3 September 2003 a NASA press release wrote,

Newly discovered asteroid 2003 QQ_{47} has received considerable media attention over the last few days because it had a small chance of colliding with the Earth in the year 2014 and was rated a "1" on the Torino Impact Hazard Scale, which goes from 0 to 10. The odds of collision in 2014, as estimated by JPL's Sentry impact monitoring system, peaked at 1 chance in 250,000, a result which was posted on our Impact Risk Page on Saturday, August 30, 2003. Impact events at the Torino Scale 1 level certainly merit careful monitoring by astronomers, but these events do not warrant public concern. In fact, each year several newly discovered asteroids reach Torino Scale 1 for a brief period after discovery; 2003 QQ_{47} is the fourth such case this year.

On September 2, 2003, new measurements of 2003 QQ_{47}'s position allowed us to narrow our prediction of its path in 2014, and thus we could rule out any Earth impact possibilities for 2014.

2003 QQ_{47} has a diameter of approximately 1.24 km, and a mass of approximately 2.0×10^{12} kg. If it were to hit the Earth, it would be a major event, with an energy of approximately 350,000 megatons of TNT (1.5 ZJ), enough to cause global damage.

Sara Russell, a meteorite researcher at London's Natural History Museum, told the BBC on 2 September 2003 that she was not worried that 2003 QQ_{47} would be a danger; "The odds are very, very low ... We have to keep some kind of perspective", she said.

As a result of the press coverage of asteroids such as 2003 QQ_{47}, astronomers are now planning to re-word the Torino scale, or to phase it out completely in favour of a scale that is less likely to generate false alarms that may reduce public confidence in genuine alerts.

== Binary system ==
A minor-planet moon orbiting (143649) 2003 QQ_{47} was first detected on 29 August 2021, by Petr Pravec, Peter Kušnirák, Kamil Hornoch, and others using photometric data from ESO's La Silla Observatory in Chile. The discovery was announced on 17 September 2021. The secondary measures a third the size of its primary (D_{s}/D_{p}-ratio of 0.33), resulting in a mean-diameter of approximately 310 meters. It is estimated to be tidally locked, orbiting 1.4 kilometers (4,600 ft) from the primary every 13.065 hours. The primary has a rotation period of 2.6446±0.0007 hours and a derived diameter of 0.94±0.40 kilometers, for a resulting effective diameter (system) of 0.995±0.42 kilometers.

== In fiction ==
- The asteroid was mentioned in Anonymous Rex (Les Reptilians) (2004) as the asteroid which the dinosaurs were counting on to destroy human civilization.
- The Korean drama My Love from the Star also mentions it as the asteroid that will allow Do Min-joon to travel back to his home planet.
