= List of minor planets: 142001–143000 =

The following is a partial list of minor planets, running from minor-planet number 142001 through 143000, inclusive. The primary data for this and other partial lists is based on JPL's "Small-Body Orbital Elements" and data available from the Minor Planet Center. Critical list information is also provided by the MPC, unless otherwise specified from Lowell Observatory. A detailed description of the table's columns and additional sources are given on the main page including a complete list of every page in this series, and a statistical break-up on the dynamical classification of minor planets.

Also see the summary list of all named bodies in numerical and alphabetical order, and the corresponding naming citations for the number range of this particular list. New namings may only be added to this list after official publication, as the preannouncement of names is condemned by the Working Group for Small Bodies Nomenclature of the International Astronomical Union.

Near-Earth obj.	MBA (inner)	MBA (outer)	Centaur
Mars-crosser	MBA (middle)	Jupiter trojan	Trans-Neptunian obj.
Unclassified

== 142001–142100 ==
Designation			Discovery			Properties		Ref
Permanent	Provisional	Named after	Date	Site	Discoverer(s)	Category	Diam.	Ref
142001	2002 PW_{159}	—	August 8, 2002	Palomar	S. F. Hönig	MAS	1.1 km	MPC · JPL
142002	2002 PM_{160}	—	August 8, 2002	Palomar	S. F. Hönig	·	860 m	MPC · JPL
142003	2002 PP_{160}	—	August 8, 2002	Palomar	S. F. Hönig	·	1.1 km	MPC · JPL
142004	2002 PE_{161}	—	August 8, 2002	Palomar	S. F. Hönig	·	1.5 km	MPC · JPL
142005	2002 PS_{161}	—	August 8, 2002	Palomar	S. F. Hönig	NYS	2.0 km	MPC · JPL
142006	2002 PG_{162}	—	August 8, 2002	Palomar	S. F. Hönig	MAS	800 m	MPC · JPL
142007	2002 PJ_{162}	—	August 8, 2002	Palomar	S. F. Hönig	·	1.5 km	MPC · JPL
142008	2002 PT_{162}	—	August 8, 2002	Palomar	S. F. Hönig	(5)	2.1 km	MPC · JPL
142009	2002 PS_{163}	—	August 8, 2002	Palomar	S. F. Hönig	·	2.6 km	MPC · JPL
142010	2002 PX_{163}	—	August 8, 2002	Palomar	S. F. Hönig	·	1.6 km	MPC · JPL
142011	2002 PW_{164}	—	August 9, 2002	Haleakala	Lowe, A.	·	3.1 km	MPC · JPL
142012	2002 PF_{165}	—	August 8, 2002	Palomar	S. F. Hönig	·	1.7 km	MPC · JPL
142013	2002 PC_{167}	—	August 8, 2002	Palomar	NEAT	NYS	1.6 km	MPC · JPL
142014 Neirinck	2002 PA_{168}	Neirinck	August 8, 2002	Palomar	NEAT	·	1.7 km	MPC · JPL
142015	2002 PW_{169}	—	August 11, 2002	Haleakala	NEAT	·	1.6 km	MPC · JPL
142016	2002 PD_{172}	—	August 8, 2002	Palomar	NEAT	·	1.5 km	MPC · JPL
142017	2002 PB_{173}	—	August 7, 2002	Palomar	NEAT	·	3.8 km	MPC · JPL
142018	2002 PK_{173}	—	August 8, 2002	Palomar	NEAT	·	1.5 km	MPC · JPL
142019	2002 PG_{174}	—	August 8, 2002	Palomar	NEAT	V	980 m	MPC · JPL
142020 Xinghaishiyan	2002 PH_{178}	Xinghaishiyan	August 15, 2002	Palomar	NEAT	·	2.4 km	MPC · JPL
142021	2002 QB_{1}	—	August 16, 2002	Haleakala	NEAT	·	1.6 km	MPC · JPL
142022	2002 QE_{1}	—	August 16, 2002	Haleakala	NEAT	·	1.1 km	MPC · JPL
142023	2002 QY_{2}	—	August 16, 2002	Palomar	NEAT	·	1.6 km	MPC · JPL
142024	2002 QO_{3}	—	August 16, 2002	Palomar	NEAT	·	2.1 km	MPC · JPL
142025	2002 QR_{4}	—	August 16, 2002	Palomar	NEAT	·	1.9 km	MPC · JPL
142026	2002 QY_{4}	—	August 16, 2002	Palomar	NEAT	·	2.0 km	MPC · JPL
142027	2002 QM_{5}	—	August 16, 2002	Palomar	NEAT	·	1.9 km	MPC · JPL
142028	2002 QU_{5}	—	August 17, 2002	Anderson Mesa	LONEOS	PHO	2.3 km	MPC · JPL
142029	2002 QE_{6}	—	August 17, 2002	Socorro	LINEAR	PHO	2.6 km	MPC · JPL
142030	2002 QG_{6}	—	August 17, 2002	Socorro	LINEAR	·	2.4 km	MPC · JPL
142031	2002 QR_{6}	—	August 20, 2002	Kvistaberg	Uppsala-DLR Asteroid Survey	·	1.7 km	MPC · JPL
142032	2002 QN_{7}	—	August 16, 2002	Palomar	NEAT	NYS	1.9 km	MPC · JPL
142033	2002 QY_{7}	—	August 19, 2002	Palomar	NEAT	·	1.3 km	MPC · JPL
142034	2002 QJ_{8}	—	August 19, 2002	Palomar	NEAT	NYS	3.3 km	MPC · JPL
142035	2002 QT_{9}	—	August 20, 2002	Palomar	NEAT	·	1.7 km	MPC · JPL
142036	2002 QH_{11}	—	August 26, 2002	Palomar	NEAT	·	1.6 km	MPC · JPL
142037	2002 QJ_{13}	—	August 26, 2002	Palomar	NEAT	·	2.1 km	MPC · JPL
142038	2002 QS_{13}	—	August 26, 2002	Palomar	NEAT	·	2.0 km	MPC · JPL
142039	2002 QX_{13}	—	August 26, 2002	Palomar	NEAT	·	2.4 km	MPC · JPL
142040	2002 QE_{15}	—	August 26, 2002	Socorro	LINEAR	AMO +1km	1.2 km	MPC · JPL
142041	2002 QR_{15}	—	August 21, 2002	Palomar	NEAT	·	2.8 km	MPC · JPL
142042	2002 QS_{15}	—	August 21, 2002	Palomar	NEAT	NYS	1.9 km	MPC · JPL
142043	2002 QX_{15}	—	August 27, 2002	Socorro	LINEAR	PHO	4.6 km	MPC · JPL
142044	2002 QZ_{15}	—	August 27, 2002	Palomar	NEAT	V	860 m	MPC · JPL
142045	2002 QD_{16}	—	August 26, 2002	Palomar	NEAT	·	1.5 km	MPC · JPL
142046	2002 QK_{16}	—	August 26, 2002	Palomar	NEAT	·	1.2 km	MPC · JPL
142047	2002 QK_{18}	—	August 28, 2002	Palomar	NEAT	·	1.9 km	MPC · JPL
142048	2002 QU_{18}	—	August 26, 2002	Palomar	NEAT	·	1.7 km	MPC · JPL
142049	2002 QK_{20}	—	August 28, 2002	Palomar	NEAT	·	2.3 km	MPC · JPL
142050	2002 QP_{20}	—	August 28, 2002	Palomar	NEAT	NYS	2.2 km	MPC · JPL
142051	2002 QQ_{20}	—	August 28, 2002	Palomar	NEAT	·	2.0 km	MPC · JPL
142052	2002 QS_{20}	—	August 28, 2002	Palomar	NEAT	V	1.2 km	MPC · JPL
142053	2002 QL_{21}	—	August 28, 2002	Palomar	NEAT	NYS	1.9 km	MPC · JPL
142054	2002 QB_{22}	—	August 27, 2002	Palomar	NEAT	CLA	2.6 km	MPC · JPL
142055	2002 QP_{23}	—	August 28, 2002	Palomar	NEAT	MAS	1.4 km	MPC · JPL
142056	2002 QA_{24}	—	August 28, 2002	Palomar	NEAT	·	2.2 km	MPC · JPL
142057	2002 QZ_{25}	—	August 29, 2002	Kitt Peak	Spacewatch	·	1.3 km	MPC · JPL
142058	2002 QM_{27}	—	August 28, 2002	Palomar	NEAT	MAS	1.1 km	MPC · JPL
142059	2002 QH_{29}	—	August 29, 2002	Palomar	NEAT	·	1.5 km	MPC · JPL
142060	2002 QH_{30}	—	August 29, 2002	Palomar	NEAT	V	930 m	MPC · JPL
142061	2002 QP_{31}	—	August 29, 2002	Palomar	NEAT	V	1.1 km	MPC · JPL
142062	2002 QR_{32}	—	August 29, 2002	Palomar	NEAT	·	2.5 km	MPC · JPL
142063	2002 QS_{32}	—	August 29, 2002	Palomar	NEAT	MAS	1.1 km	MPC · JPL
142064	2002 QY_{32}	—	August 29, 2002	Palomar	NEAT	V	1.1 km	MPC · JPL
142065	2002 QL_{33}	—	August 29, 2002	Palomar	NEAT	·	1.2 km	MPC · JPL
142066	2002 QC_{35}	—	August 29, 2002	Palomar	NEAT	NYS	1.6 km	MPC · JPL
142067	2002 QV_{35}	—	August 29, 2002	Palomar	NEAT	·	3.2 km	MPC · JPL
142068	2002 QA_{36}	—	August 29, 2002	Palomar	NEAT	NYS	1.8 km	MPC · JPL
142069	2002 QH_{36}	—	August 30, 2002	Palomar	NEAT	·	3.5 km	MPC · JPL
142070	2002 QO_{36}	—	August 28, 2002	Palomar	NEAT	MAS	1.3 km	MPC · JPL
142071	2002 QX_{36}	—	August 30, 2002	Kitt Peak	Spacewatch	·	1.8 km	MPC · JPL
142072	2002 QF_{39}	—	August 30, 2002	Kitt Peak	Spacewatch	·	1.6 km	MPC · JPL
142073	2002 QQ_{41}	—	August 29, 2002	Palomar	NEAT	·	2.0 km	MPC · JPL
142074	2002 QW_{41}	—	August 29, 2002	Palomar	NEAT	·	1.7 km	MPC · JPL
142075	2002 QK_{42}	—	August 30, 2002	Palomar	NEAT	·	1.7 km	MPC · JPL
142076	2002 QQ_{42}	—	August 30, 2002	Palomar	NEAT	·	2.3 km	MPC · JPL
142077	2002 QB_{43}	—	August 30, 2002	Palomar	NEAT	·	2.1 km	MPC · JPL
142078	2002 QZ_{43}	—	August 30, 2002	Palomar	NEAT	·	1.4 km	MPC · JPL
142079	2002 QB_{44}	—	August 30, 2002	Palomar	NEAT	V	1.3 km	MPC · JPL
142080	2002 QT_{44}	—	August 30, 2002	Kitt Peak	Spacewatch	(5)	1.7 km	MPC · JPL
142081	2002 QD_{46}	—	August 29, 2002	Palomar	NEAT	·	1.9 km	MPC · JPL
142082	2002 QQ_{46}	—	August 31, 2002	Socorro	LINEAR	MAS	1.1 km	MPC · JPL
142083	2002 QK_{47}	—	August 30, 2002	Anderson Mesa	LONEOS	·	1.6 km	MPC · JPL
142084 Jamesdaniel	2002 QU_{47}	Jamesdaniel	August 29, 2002	Wrightwood	J. W. Young	MAS	1.1 km	MPC · JPL
142085	2002 QB_{48}	—	August 29, 2002	Palomar	S. F. Hönig	MAS	890 m	MPC · JPL
142086	2002 QK_{50}	—	August 16, 2002	Palomar	Lowe, A.	·	1.6 km	MPC · JPL
142087	2002 QM_{50}	—	August 16, 2002	Palomar	Lowe, A.	·	1.6 km	MPC · JPL
142088	2002 QN_{50}	—	August 30, 2002	Palomar	R. Matson	·	1.4 km	MPC · JPL
142089	2002 QE_{52}	—	August 29, 2002	Palomar	S. F. Hönig	·	1.7 km	MPC · JPL
142090	2002 QL_{52}	—	August 29, 2002	Palomar	S. F. Hönig	·	2.3 km	MPC · JPL
142091 Omerblaes	2002 QW_{52}	Omerblaes	August 29, 2002	Palomar	S. F. Hönig	V	980 m	MPC · JPL
142092	2002 QT_{53}	—	August 29, 2002	Palomar	S. F. Hönig	·	3.1 km	MPC · JPL
142093	2002 QM_{54}	—	August 29, 2002	Palomar	S. F. Hönig	NYS	1.4 km	MPC · JPL
142094	2002 QR_{55}	—	August 29, 2002	Palomar	S. F. Hönig	·	1.2 km	MPC · JPL
142095	2002 QR_{58}	—	August 18, 2002	Palomar	NEAT	V	940 m	MPC · JPL
142096	2002 QR_{59}	—	August 26, 2002	Palomar	NEAT	·	1.6 km	MPC · JPL
142097	2002 QG_{62}	—	August 29, 2002	Palomar	NEAT	·	2.8 km	MPC · JPL
142098	2002 QU_{63}	—	August 17, 2002	Palomar	NEAT	·	2.6 km	MPC · JPL
142099	2002 QO_{64}	—	August 30, 2002	Palomar	NEAT	KOR	2.1 km	MPC · JPL
142100	2002 QE_{66}	—	August 29, 2002	Palomar	NEAT	MAS	820 m	MPC · JPL

== 142101–142200 ==
back to top

Designation			Discovery			Properties		Ref
Permanent	Provisional	Named after	Date	Site	Discoverer(s)	Category	Diam.	Ref
142101	2002 QJ_{68}	—	August 18, 2002	Palomar	NEAT	·	1.2 km	MPC · JPL
142102	2002 QP_{69}	—	August 18, 2002	Palomar	NEAT	·	1.7 km	MPC · JPL
142103	2002 QV_{74}	—	August 18, 2002	Palomar	NEAT	·	920 m	MPC · JPL
142104	2002 QM_{78}	—	August 30, 2002	Palomar	NEAT	·	1.4 km	MPC · JPL
142105	2002 QX_{83}	—	August 19, 2002	Palomar	NEAT	·	1.7 km	MPC · JPL
142106 Nengshun	2002 QZ_{83}	Nengshun	August 30, 2002	Nanchuan	Q. Ye	V	1.1 km	MPC · JPL
142107	2002 QG_{86}	—	August 17, 2002	Palomar	NEAT	·	1.3 km	MPC · JPL
142108	2002 QJ_{86}	—	August 17, 2002	Palomar	NEAT	·	4.3 km	MPC · JPL
142109	2002 QD_{92}	—	August 18, 2002	Palomar	NEAT	·	1.7 km	MPC · JPL
142110	2002 RO	—	September 2, 2002	Ondřejov	P. Kušnirák, P. Pravec	·	1.9 km	MPC · JPL
142111	2002 RU_{1}	—	September 4, 2002	Anderson Mesa	LONEOS	·	1.9 km	MPC · JPL
142112	2002 RS_{2}	—	September 4, 2002	Anderson Mesa	LONEOS	MAS	1.3 km	MPC · JPL
142113	2002 RS_{3}	—	September 1, 2002	Haleakala	NEAT	NYS	1.4 km	MPC · JPL
142114	2002 RA_{4}	—	September 2, 2002	Haleakala	NEAT	·	2.0 km	MPC · JPL
142115	2002 RC_{5}	—	September 3, 2002	Palomar	NEAT	·	2.3 km	MPC · JPL
142116	2002 RE_{5}	—	September 3, 2002	Palomar	NEAT	·	2.7 km	MPC · JPL
142117	2002 RY_{5}	—	September 1, 2002	Anderson Mesa	LONEOS	MAS	1.4 km	MPC · JPL
142118	2002 RE_{6}	—	September 1, 2002	Haleakala	NEAT	·	1.9 km	MPC · JPL
142119	2002 RD_{7}	—	September 2, 2002	Kitt Peak	Spacewatch	·	1.4 km	MPC · JPL
142120	2002 RM_{7}	—	September 3, 2002	Haleakala	NEAT	NYS ·	1.6 km	MPC · JPL
142121	2002 RD_{8}	—	September 3, 2002	Haleakala	NEAT	·	2.8 km	MPC · JPL
142122	2002 RG_{8}	—	September 3, 2002	Haleakala	NEAT	·	1.8 km	MPC · JPL
142123	2002 RA_{9}	—	September 4, 2002	Palomar	NEAT	·	1.2 km	MPC · JPL
142124	2002 RP_{9}	—	September 4, 2002	Palomar	NEAT	·	2.1 km	MPC · JPL
142125	2002 RR_{9}	—	September 4, 2002	Palomar	NEAT	V	1.2 km	MPC · JPL
142126	2002 RT_{9}	—	September 4, 2002	Palomar	NEAT	NYS	1.5 km	MPC · JPL
142127	2002 RY_{9}	—	September 4, 2002	Palomar	NEAT	·	1.8 km	MPC · JPL
142128	2002 RE_{10}	—	September 4, 2002	Palomar	NEAT	·	2.2 km	MPC · JPL
142129	2002 RD_{11}	—	September 4, 2002	Palomar	NEAT	·	2.0 km	MPC · JPL
142130	2002 RU_{11}	—	September 4, 2002	Anderson Mesa	LONEOS	·	2.5 km	MPC · JPL
142131	2002 RV_{11}	—	September 4, 2002	Anderson Mesa	LONEOS	NYS	2.4 km	MPC · JPL
142132	2002 RW_{13}	—	September 4, 2002	Anderson Mesa	LONEOS	·	2.4 km	MPC · JPL
142133	2002 RY_{13}	—	September 4, 2002	Anderson Mesa	LONEOS	(5)	1.4 km	MPC · JPL
142134	2002 RH_{14}	—	September 4, 2002	Anderson Mesa	LONEOS	·	1.8 km	MPC · JPL
142135	2002 RY_{14}	—	September 4, 2002	Anderson Mesa	LONEOS	·	2.5 km	MPC · JPL
142136	2002 RZ_{14}	—	September 4, 2002	Anderson Mesa	LONEOS	·	1.7 km	MPC · JPL
142137	2002 RN_{15}	—	September 4, 2002	Anderson Mesa	LONEOS	V	1.2 km	MPC · JPL
142138	2002 RQ_{16}	—	September 4, 2002	Anderson Mesa	LONEOS	·	1.3 km	MPC · JPL
142139	2002 RR_{16}	—	September 4, 2002	Anderson Mesa	LONEOS	·	1.8 km	MPC · JPL
142140	2002 RA_{17}	—	September 4, 2002	Anderson Mesa	LONEOS	NYS	1.6 km	MPC · JPL
142141	2002 RT_{17}	—	September 4, 2002	Anderson Mesa	LONEOS	·	1.7 km	MPC · JPL
142142	2002 RW_{17}	—	September 4, 2002	Anderson Mesa	LONEOS	·	2.2 km	MPC · JPL
142143	2002 RM_{18}	—	September 4, 2002	Anderson Mesa	LONEOS	MAS	1.3 km	MPC · JPL
142144	2002 RX_{18}	—	September 4, 2002	Anderson Mesa	LONEOS	·	1.6 km	MPC · JPL
142145	2002 RD_{19}	—	September 4, 2002	Anderson Mesa	LONEOS	V	1.2 km	MPC · JPL
142146	2002 RZ_{19}	—	September 4, 2002	Anderson Mesa	LONEOS	·	2.6 km	MPC · JPL
142147	2002 RR_{20}	—	September 4, 2002	Anderson Mesa	LONEOS	NYS	2.0 km	MPC · JPL
142148	2002 RD_{21}	—	September 4, 2002	Anderson Mesa	LONEOS	·	2.5 km	MPC · JPL
142149	2002 RR_{21}	—	September 4, 2002	Anderson Mesa	LONEOS	·	1.8 km	MPC · JPL
142150	2002 RT_{21}	—	September 4, 2002	Anderson Mesa	LONEOS	MAS	1.5 km	MPC · JPL
142151	2002 RN_{24}	—	September 4, 2002	Anderson Mesa	LONEOS	·	1.6 km	MPC · JPL
142152	2002 RO_{24}	—	September 4, 2002	Anderson Mesa	LONEOS	(5)	1.9 km	MPC · JPL
142153	2002 RS_{24}	—	September 4, 2002	Anderson Mesa	LONEOS	V	1.4 km	MPC · JPL
142154	2002 RM_{28}	—	September 5, 2002	Ondřejov	P. Kušnirák	NYS	1.8 km	MPC · JPL
142155	2002 RT_{28}	—	September 6, 2002	Emerald Lane	L. Ball	·	2.4 km	MPC · JPL
142156	2002 RX_{29}	—	September 4, 2002	Anderson Mesa	LONEOS	·	2.1 km	MPC · JPL
142157	2002 RB_{30}	—	September 4, 2002	Anderson Mesa	LONEOS	·	2.6 km	MPC · JPL
142158	2002 RS_{30}	—	September 4, 2002	Anderson Mesa	LONEOS	·	1.4 km	MPC · JPL
142159	2002 RT_{30}	—	September 4, 2002	Anderson Mesa	LONEOS	·	2.0 km	MPC · JPL
142160	2002 RN_{31}	—	September 4, 2002	Anderson Mesa	LONEOS	V	1.2 km	MPC · JPL
142161	2002 RR_{31}	—	September 4, 2002	Anderson Mesa	LONEOS	(5)	2.3 km	MPC · JPL
142162	2002 RY_{31}	—	September 4, 2002	Anderson Mesa	LONEOS	·	2.5 km	MPC · JPL
142163	2002 RF_{32}	—	September 4, 2002	Anderson Mesa	LONEOS	·	2.0 km	MPC · JPL
142164	2002 RG_{32}	—	September 4, 2002	Anderson Mesa	LONEOS	·	2.5 km	MPC · JPL
142165	2002 RF_{33}	—	September 4, 2002	Anderson Mesa	LONEOS	V	1.1 km	MPC · JPL
142166	2002 RK_{34}	—	September 4, 2002	Anderson Mesa	LONEOS	NYS	2.0 km	MPC · JPL
142167	2002 RM_{34}	—	September 4, 2002	Anderson Mesa	LONEOS	·	2.6 km	MPC · JPL
142168	2002 RC_{35}	—	September 4, 2002	Anderson Mesa	LONEOS	·	2.3 km	MPC · JPL
142169	2002 RS_{35}	—	September 5, 2002	Anderson Mesa	LONEOS	(194)	2.5 km	MPC · JPL
142170	2002 RP_{36}	—	September 5, 2002	Socorro	LINEAR	·	2.0 km	MPC · JPL
142171	2002 RE_{38}	—	September 5, 2002	Socorro	LINEAR	·	1.8 km	MPC · JPL
142172	2002 RK_{39}	—	September 5, 2002	Socorro	LINEAR	·	2.6 km	MPC · JPL
142173	2002 RN_{39}	—	September 5, 2002	Socorro	LINEAR	·	2.7 km	MPC · JPL
142174	2002 RO_{39}	—	September 5, 2002	Socorro	LINEAR	MAS	1.1 km	MPC · JPL
142175	2002 RB_{40}	—	September 5, 2002	Socorro	LINEAR	NYS	1.9 km	MPC · JPL
142176	2002 RE_{40}	—	September 5, 2002	Socorro	LINEAR	·	5.2 km	MPC · JPL
142177	2002 RT_{40}	—	September 5, 2002	Socorro	LINEAR	·	3.9 km	MPC · JPL
142178	2002 RW_{41}	—	September 5, 2002	Socorro	LINEAR	·	1.6 km	MPC · JPL
142179	2002 RL_{43}	—	September 5, 2002	Socorro	LINEAR	NYS	2.3 km	MPC · JPL
142180	2002 RN_{43}	—	September 5, 2002	Socorro	LINEAR	V	1.0 km	MPC · JPL
142181	2002 RP_{45}	—	September 5, 2002	Socorro	LINEAR	NYS	2.4 km	MPC · JPL
142182	2002 RW_{45}	—	September 5, 2002	Socorro	LINEAR	·	1.3 km	MPC · JPL
142183	2002 RP_{46}	—	September 5, 2002	Socorro	LINEAR	MAS	1.5 km	MPC · JPL
142184	2002 RC_{47}	—	September 5, 2002	Socorro	LINEAR	·	2.3 km	MPC · JPL
142185	2002 RV_{47}	—	September 5, 2002	Socorro	LINEAR	NYS	4.1 km	MPC · JPL
142186	2002 RW_{47}	—	September 5, 2002	Socorro	LINEAR	·	1.9 km	MPC · JPL
142187	2002 RZ_{47}	—	September 5, 2002	Socorro	LINEAR	MAS	1.3 km	MPC · JPL
142188	2002 RC_{49}	—	September 5, 2002	Socorro	LINEAR	MAS	1.6 km	MPC · JPL
142189	2002 RO_{49}	—	September 5, 2002	Socorro	LINEAR	NYS	2.5 km	MPC · JPL
142190	2002 RN_{50}	—	September 5, 2002	Socorro	LINEAR	·	2.5 km	MPC · JPL
142191	2002 RV_{50}	—	September 5, 2002	Socorro	LINEAR	·	2.0 km	MPC · JPL
142192	2002 RU_{51}	—	September 5, 2002	Socorro	LINEAR	·	2.6 km	MPC · JPL
142193	2002 RU_{52}	—	September 5, 2002	Anderson Mesa	LONEOS	·	1.5 km	MPC · JPL
142194	2002 RF_{53}	—	September 5, 2002	Socorro	LINEAR	·	2.4 km	MPC · JPL
142195	2002 RK_{54}	—	September 5, 2002	Socorro	LINEAR	V	1.1 km	MPC · JPL
142196	2002 RP_{54}	—	September 5, 2002	Socorro	LINEAR	·	1.7 km	MPC · JPL
142197	2002 RT_{55}	—	September 5, 2002	Anderson Mesa	LONEOS	·	1.5 km	MPC · JPL
142198	2002 RN_{56}	—	September 5, 2002	Anderson Mesa	LONEOS	V	1.3 km	MPC · JPL
142199	2002 RC_{57}	—	September 5, 2002	Anderson Mesa	LONEOS	·	2.6 km	MPC · JPL
142200	2002 RF_{57}	—	September 5, 2002	Anderson Mesa	LONEOS	·	2.0 km	MPC · JPL

== 142201–142300 ==
back to top

Designation			Discovery			Properties		Ref
Permanent	Provisional	Named after	Date	Site	Discoverer(s)	Category	Diam.	Ref
142201	2002 RN_{57}	—	September 5, 2002	Anderson Mesa	LONEOS	·	2.3 km	MPC · JPL
142202	2002 RY_{57}	—	September 5, 2002	Anderson Mesa	LONEOS	·	1.7 km	MPC · JPL
142203	2002 RJ_{58}	—	September 5, 2002	Anderson Mesa	LONEOS	·	2.1 km	MPC · JPL
142204	2002 RH_{59}	—	September 5, 2002	Anderson Mesa	LONEOS	·	2.3 km	MPC · JPL
142205	2002 RP_{60}	—	September 5, 2002	Anderson Mesa	LONEOS	·	1.9 km	MPC · JPL
142206	2002 RD_{61}	—	September 5, 2002	Socorro	LINEAR	JUN	1.8 km	MPC · JPL
142207	2002 RY_{61}	—	September 5, 2002	Socorro	LINEAR	·	2.5 km	MPC · JPL
142208	2002 RT_{62}	—	September 5, 2002	Socorro	LINEAR	(5)	2.2 km	MPC · JPL
142209	2002 RX_{62}	—	September 5, 2002	Socorro	LINEAR	·	2.1 km	MPC · JPL
142210	2002 RG_{63}	—	September 5, 2002	Socorro	LINEAR	·	2.1 km	MPC · JPL
142211	2002 RH_{63}	—	September 5, 2002	Socorro	LINEAR	V	1.5 km	MPC · JPL
142212	2002 RG_{64}	—	September 5, 2002	Socorro	LINEAR	·	3.6 km	MPC · JPL
142213	2002 RN_{65}	—	September 5, 2002	Socorro	LINEAR	·	4.8 km	MPC · JPL
142214	2002 RW_{65}	—	September 5, 2002	Socorro	LINEAR	EUN	3.0 km	MPC · JPL
142215	2002 RD_{68}	—	September 4, 2002	Anderson Mesa	LONEOS	·	2.0 km	MPC · JPL
142216	2002 RW_{69}	—	September 4, 2002	Anderson Mesa	LONEOS	·	1.7 km	MPC · JPL
142217	2002 RG_{70}	—	September 4, 2002	Palomar	NEAT	·	2.2 km	MPC · JPL
142218	2002 RG_{72}	—	September 5, 2002	Socorro	LINEAR	MAS	1.4 km	MPC · JPL
142219	2002 RS_{72}	—	September 5, 2002	Socorro	LINEAR	·	2.3 km	MPC · JPL
142220	2002 RD_{73}	—	September 5, 2002	Socorro	LINEAR	·	2.0 km	MPC · JPL
142221	2002 RL_{73}	—	September 5, 2002	Socorro	LINEAR	·	2.1 km	MPC · JPL
142222	2002 RP_{74}	—	September 5, 2002	Socorro	LINEAR	NYS	1.3 km	MPC · JPL
142223	2002 RE_{75}	—	September 5, 2002	Socorro	LINEAR	·	1.8 km	MPC · JPL
142224	2002 RF_{75}	—	September 5, 2002	Socorro	LINEAR	·	1.6 km	MPC · JPL
142225	2002 RP_{76}	—	September 5, 2002	Socorro	LINEAR	·	1.7 km	MPC · JPL
142226	2002 RE_{77}	—	September 5, 2002	Socorro	LINEAR	·	2.5 km	MPC · JPL
142227	2002 RA_{81}	—	September 5, 2002	Socorro	LINEAR	·	2.0 km	MPC · JPL
142228	2002 RB_{81}	—	September 5, 2002	Socorro	LINEAR	MAS	1.5 km	MPC · JPL
142229	2002 RE_{81}	—	September 5, 2002	Socorro	LINEAR	·	1.7 km	MPC · JPL
142230	2002 RR_{81}	—	September 5, 2002	Socorro	LINEAR	·	2.1 km	MPC · JPL
142231	2002 RZ_{82}	—	September 5, 2002	Socorro	LINEAR	·	1.9 km	MPC · JPL
142232	2002 RN_{83}	—	September 5, 2002	Socorro	LINEAR	·	1.6 km	MPC · JPL
142233	2002 RZ_{84}	—	September 5, 2002	Socorro	LINEAR	·	1.9 km	MPC · JPL
142234	2002 RH_{85}	—	September 5, 2002	Socorro	LINEAR	·	1.9 km	MPC · JPL
142235	2002 RA_{89}	—	September 5, 2002	Socorro	LINEAR	MAS	890 m	MPC · JPL
142236	2002 RE_{89}	—	September 5, 2002	Socorro	LINEAR	·	2.6 km	MPC · JPL
142237	2002 RA_{90}	—	September 5, 2002	Socorro	LINEAR	·	1.7 km	MPC · JPL
142238	2002 RE_{90}	—	September 5, 2002	Socorro	LINEAR	·	1.7 km	MPC · JPL
142239	2002 RJ_{93}	—	September 5, 2002	Anderson Mesa	LONEOS	·	2.5 km	MPC · JPL
142240	2002 RE_{96}	—	September 5, 2002	Socorro	LINEAR	·	1.8 km	MPC · JPL
142241	2002 RT_{96}	—	September 5, 2002	Socorro	LINEAR	MAS	1.2 km	MPC · JPL
142242	2002 RP_{97}	—	September 5, 2002	Socorro	LINEAR	·	1.6 km	MPC · JPL
142243	2002 RQ_{99}	—	September 5, 2002	Socorro	LINEAR	HYG	6.9 km	MPC · JPL
142244	2002 RD_{100}	—	September 5, 2002	Socorro	LINEAR	·	2.9 km	MPC · JPL
142245	2002 RL_{100}	—	September 5, 2002	Socorro	LINEAR	·	1.6 km	MPC · JPL
142246	2002 RR_{100}	—	September 5, 2002	Socorro	LINEAR	·	2.5 km	MPC · JPL
142247	2002 RS_{100}	—	September 5, 2002	Socorro	LINEAR	MAS	1.5 km	MPC · JPL
142248	2002 RX_{100}	—	September 5, 2002	Socorro	LINEAR	·	2.2 km	MPC · JPL
142249	2002 RE_{102}	—	September 5, 2002	Socorro	LINEAR	·	2.2 km	MPC · JPL
142250	2002 RO_{102}	—	September 5, 2002	Socorro	LINEAR	·	2.3 km	MPC · JPL
142251	2002 RX_{102}	—	September 5, 2002	Socorro	LINEAR	·	5.0 km	MPC · JPL
142252	2002 RA_{104}	—	September 5, 2002	Socorro	LINEAR	·	3.5 km	MPC · JPL
142253	2002 RN_{104}	—	September 5, 2002	Socorro	LINEAR	·	2.0 km	MPC · JPL
142254	2002 RQ_{105}	—	September 5, 2002	Socorro	LINEAR	·	2.6 km	MPC · JPL
142255	2002 RQ_{106}	—	September 5, 2002	Socorro	LINEAR	·	2.8 km	MPC · JPL
142256	2002 RS_{106}	—	September 5, 2002	Socorro	LINEAR	·	4.6 km	MPC · JPL
142257	2002 RT_{106}	—	September 5, 2002	Socorro	LINEAR	·	4.2 km	MPC · JPL
142258	2002 RZ_{106}	—	September 5, 2002	Socorro	LINEAR	·	3.5 km	MPC · JPL
142259	2002 RD_{107}	—	September 5, 2002	Socorro	LINEAR	·	3.2 km	MPC · JPL
142260	2002 RL_{107}	—	September 5, 2002	Socorro	LINEAR	(5)	1.9 km	MPC · JPL
142261	2002 RS_{107}	—	September 5, 2002	Socorro	LINEAR	(5)	2.4 km	MPC · JPL
142262	2002 RW_{107}	—	September 5, 2002	Socorro	LINEAR	·	2.4 km	MPC · JPL
142263	2002 RP_{108}	—	September 5, 2002	Haleakala	NEAT	·	1.6 km	MPC · JPL
142264	2002 RW_{108}	—	September 5, 2002	Haleakala	NEAT	NYS ·	1.9 km	MPC · JPL
142265	2002 RO_{111}	—	September 6, 2002	Socorro	LINEAR	·	2.9 km	MPC · JPL
142266	2002 RQ_{111}	—	September 6, 2002	Socorro	LINEAR	·	2.0 km	MPC · JPL
142267	2002 RN_{113}	—	September 5, 2002	Socorro	LINEAR	·	1.8 km	MPC · JPL
142268	2002 RW_{113}	—	September 5, 2002	Socorro	LINEAR	·	2.2 km	MPC · JPL
142269	2002 RE_{114}	—	September 5, 2002	Socorro	LINEAR	NYS	2.0 km	MPC · JPL
142270	2002 RJ_{114}	—	September 5, 2002	Socorro	LINEAR	·	1.5 km	MPC · JPL
142271	2002 RY_{114}	—	September 6, 2002	Socorro	LINEAR	·	1.3 km	MPC · JPL
142272	2002 RB_{115}	—	September 6, 2002	Socorro	LINEAR	·	5.9 km	MPC · JPL
142273	2002 RD_{115}	—	September 6, 2002	Socorro	LINEAR	EUN	2.6 km	MPC · JPL
142274	2002 RO_{115}	—	September 6, 2002	Socorro	LINEAR	·	3.7 km	MPC · JPL
142275 Simonyi	2002 RQ_{117}	Simonyi	September 8, 2002	Piszkéstető	K. Sárneczky	HNS	1.6 km	MPC · JPL
142276	2002 RX_{118}	—	September 1, 2002	Palomar	NEAT	·	1.9 km	MPC · JPL
142277	2002 RJ_{119}	—	September 6, 2002	Socorro	LINEAR	·	2.3 km	MPC · JPL
142278	2002 RY_{120}	—	September 7, 2002	Socorro	LINEAR	NYS	2.0 km	MPC · JPL
142279	2002 RH_{121}	—	September 7, 2002	Socorro	LINEAR	·	4.1 km	MPC · JPL
142280	2002 RR_{121}	—	September 7, 2002	Socorro	LINEAR	·	2.0 km	MPC · JPL
142281	2002 RJ_{122}	—	September 8, 2002	Haleakala	NEAT	·	1.8 km	MPC · JPL
142282	2002 RT_{128}	—	September 10, 2002	Palomar	NEAT	PHO	4.7 km	MPC · JPL
142283	2002 RJ_{130}	—	September 9, 2002	Palomar	NEAT	·	2.2 km	MPC · JPL
142284	2002 RO_{132}	—	September 11, 2002	Haleakala	NEAT	·	1.8 km	MPC · JPL
142285	2002 RR_{132}	—	September 10, 2002	Needville	P. G. A. Garossino, L. Casady	V	1.2 km	MPC · JPL
142286	2002 RB_{134}	—	September 10, 2002	Palomar	NEAT	·	2.5 km	MPC · JPL
142287	2002 RZ_{134}	—	September 10, 2002	Haleakala	NEAT	·	2.5 km	MPC · JPL
142288	2002 RW_{135}	—	September 11, 2002	Haleakala	NEAT	·	2.3 km	MPC · JPL
142289	2002 RJ_{137}	—	September 12, 2002	Goodricke-Pigott	R. A. Tucker	EUN	1.9 km	MPC · JPL
142290	2002 RB_{138}	—	September 10, 2002	Haleakala	NEAT	·	3.5 km	MPC · JPL
142291 Dompfaff	2002 RE_{138}	Dompfaff	September 12, 2002	Hoher List	E. W. Elst	·	1.6 km	MPC · JPL
142292	2002 RF_{142}	—	September 11, 2002	Palomar	NEAT	V	930 m	MPC · JPL
142293	2002 RH_{142}	—	September 11, 2002	Palomar	NEAT	·	1.9 km	MPC · JPL
142294	2002 RY_{142}	—	September 11, 2002	Palomar	NEAT	·	2.7 km	MPC · JPL
142295	2002 RV_{143}	—	September 11, 2002	Palomar	NEAT	·	1.9 km	MPC · JPL
142296	2002 RP_{144}	—	September 11, 2002	Palomar	NEAT	·	2.1 km	MPC · JPL
142297	2002 RF_{145}	—	September 11, 2002	Palomar	NEAT	SUL	3.6 km	MPC · JPL
142298	2002 RO_{145}	—	September 11, 2002	Palomar	NEAT	MAS	1.2 km	MPC · JPL
142299	2002 RO_{147}	—	September 11, 2002	Palomar	NEAT	·	1.7 km	MPC · JPL
142300	2002 RY_{148}	—	September 11, 2002	Haleakala	NEAT	V	1.2 km	MPC · JPL

== 142301–142400 ==
back to top

Designation			Discovery			Properties		Ref
Permanent	Provisional	Named after	Date	Site	Discoverer(s)	Category	Diam.	Ref
142301	2002 RT_{149}	—	September 11, 2002	Haleakala	NEAT	V	1.3 km	MPC · JPL
142302	2002 RR_{150}	—	September 11, 2002	Haleakala	NEAT	·	1.7 km	MPC · JPL
142303	2002 RW_{153}	—	September 13, 2002	Kitt Peak	Spacewatch	·	2.2 km	MPC · JPL
142304	2002 RZ_{154}	—	September 10, 2002	Haleakala	NEAT	·	2.1 km	MPC · JPL
142305	2002 RN_{155}	—	September 11, 2002	Palomar	NEAT	V	1.0 km	MPC · JPL
142306	2002 RL_{157}	—	September 11, 2002	Palomar	NEAT	·	3.0 km	MPC · JPL
142307	2002 RS_{158}	—	September 11, 2002	Palomar	NEAT	MIS	2.4 km	MPC · JPL
142308	2002 RJ_{162}	—	September 12, 2002	Palomar	NEAT	·	2.0 km	MPC · JPL
142309	2002 RZ_{162}	—	September 12, 2002	Palomar	NEAT	·	1.4 km	MPC · JPL
142310	2002 RE_{164}	—	September 12, 2002	Palomar	NEAT	·	1.6 km	MPC · JPL
142311	2002 RR_{164}	—	September 12, 2002	Palomar	NEAT	·	1.9 km	MPC · JPL
142312	2002 RU_{164}	—	September 12, 2002	Palomar	NEAT	·	1.5 km	MPC · JPL
142313	2002 RD_{165}	—	September 12, 2002	Palomar	NEAT	NYS	1.3 km	MPC · JPL
142314	2002 RH_{165}	—	September 13, 2002	Palomar	NEAT	·	1.7 km	MPC · JPL
142315	2002 RU_{165}	—	September 13, 2002	Palomar	NEAT	·	2.4 km	MPC · JPL
142316	2002 RB_{166}	—	September 13, 2002	Palomar	NEAT	NYS	1.2 km	MPC · JPL
142317	2002 RE_{166}	—	September 13, 2002	Palomar	NEAT	·	2.4 km	MPC · JPL
142318	2002 RQ_{166}	—	September 13, 2002	Socorro	LINEAR	·	1.6 km	MPC · JPL
142319	2002 RD_{168}	—	September 13, 2002	Palomar	NEAT	NYS	1.8 km	MPC · JPL
142320	2002 RH_{169}	—	September 13, 2002	Palomar	NEAT	EUN	1.8 km	MPC · JPL
142321	2002 RO_{171}	—	September 13, 2002	Socorro	LINEAR	·	3.3 km	MPC · JPL
142322	2002 RX_{171}	—	September 13, 2002	Kitt Peak	Spacewatch	·	1.3 km	MPC · JPL
142323	2002 RW_{172}	—	September 13, 2002	Socorro	LINEAR	·	2.0 km	MPC · JPL
142324	2002 RC_{173}	—	September 13, 2002	Socorro	LINEAR	·	2.5 km	MPC · JPL
142325 (12112019)	2002 RB_{175}	—	September 13, 2002	Palomar	NEAT	(2076)	1.1 km	MPC · JPL
142326	2002 RZ_{176}	—	September 13, 2002	Palomar	NEAT	·	1.4 km	MPC · JPL
142327	2002 RH_{180}	—	September 14, 2002	Kitt Peak	Spacewatch	·	1.6 km	MPC · JPL
142328	2002 RL_{180}	—	September 14, 2002	Palomar	NEAT	NYS	1.6 km	MPC · JPL
142329	2002 RW_{182}	—	September 11, 2002	Palomar	NEAT	MAR	1.3 km	MPC · JPL
142330	2002 RE_{185}	—	September 12, 2002	Palomar	NEAT	·	1.9 km	MPC · JPL
142331	2002 RL_{186}	—	September 12, 2002	Palomar	NEAT	·	1.6 km	MPC · JPL
142332	2002 RG_{187}	—	September 13, 2002	Palomar	NEAT	V	1.3 km	MPC · JPL
142333	2002 RX_{187}	—	September 12, 2002	Palomar	NEAT	·	2.2 km	MPC · JPL
142334	2002 RM_{189}	—	September 14, 2002	Palomar	NEAT	V	850 m	MPC · JPL
142335	2002 RU_{189}	—	September 14, 2002	Palomar	NEAT	V	1.1 km	MPC · JPL
142336	2002 RL_{190}	—	September 14, 2002	Palomar	NEAT	NYS	1.3 km	MPC · JPL
142337	2002 RR_{195}	—	September 12, 2002	Palomar	NEAT	·	1.5 km	MPC · JPL
142338	2002 RT_{199}	—	September 13, 2002	Palomar	NEAT	·	1.3 km	MPC · JPL
142339	2002 RX_{201}	—	September 13, 2002	Anderson Mesa	LONEOS	V	1.3 km	MPC · JPL
142340	2002 RP_{202}	—	September 13, 2002	Palomar	NEAT	·	2.7 km	MPC · JPL
142341	2002 RM_{203}	—	September 14, 2002	Palomar	NEAT	V	970 m	MPC · JPL
142342	2002 RR_{203}	—	September 14, 2002	Palomar	NEAT	·	1.7 km	MPC · JPL
142343	2002 RK_{204}	—	September 14, 2002	Palomar	NEAT	NYS	2.0 km	MPC · JPL
142344	2002 RM_{205}	—	September 14, 2002	Palomar	NEAT	·	2.5 km	MPC · JPL
142345	2002 RC_{207}	—	September 14, 2002	Palomar	NEAT	MAR	1.4 km	MPC · JPL
142346	2002 RN_{207}	—	September 14, 2002	Palomar	NEAT	MAS	1.4 km	MPC · JPL
142347	2002 RT_{208}	—	September 13, 2002	Kitt Peak	Spacewatch	·	1.5 km	MPC · JPL
142348	2002 RX_{211}	—	September 9, 2002	Haleakala	NEAT	AMO	770 m	MPC · JPL
142349	2002 RR_{212}	—	September 15, 2002	Haleakala	NEAT	·	3.8 km	MPC · JPL
142350	2002 RA_{213}	—	September 12, 2002	Haleakala	NEAT	·	2.3 km	MPC · JPL
142351	2002 RJ_{213}	—	September 13, 2002	Anderson Mesa	LONEOS	·	2.9 km	MPC · JPL
142352	2002 RW_{214}	—	September 13, 2002	Socorro	LINEAR	·	1.7 km	MPC · JPL
142353	2002 RC_{217}	—	September 14, 2002	Palomar	NEAT	·	1.4 km	MPC · JPL
142354	2002 RL_{217}	—	September 14, 2002	Palomar	NEAT	·	1.6 km	MPC · JPL
142355	2002 RT_{218}	—	September 14, 2002	Haleakala	NEAT	·	3.2 km	MPC · JPL
142356	2002 RX_{218}	—	September 15, 2002	Palomar	NEAT	·	2.0 km	MPC · JPL
142357	2002 RE_{219}	—	September 15, 2002	Palomar	NEAT	NYS	1.8 km	MPC · JPL
142358	2002 RW_{220}	—	September 15, 2002	Palomar	NEAT	·	2.1 km	MPC · JPL
142359	2002 RP_{223}	—	September 13, 2002	Haleakala	NEAT	·	2.0 km	MPC · JPL
142360	2002 RL_{224}	—	September 13, 2002	Palomar	NEAT	·	1.5 km	MPC · JPL
142361	2002 RO_{225}	—	September 13, 2002	Palomar	NEAT	MAR	1.5 km	MPC · JPL
142362	2002 RD_{226}	—	September 13, 2002	Haleakala	NEAT	·	1.6 km	MPC · JPL
142363	2002 RH_{227}	—	September 14, 2002	Palomar	NEAT	·	1.4 km	MPC · JPL
142364	2002 RD_{228}	—	September 14, 2002	Haleakala	NEAT	V	1.3 km	MPC · JPL
142365	2002 RT_{228}	—	September 14, 2002	Haleakala	NEAT	V	1.2 km	MPC · JPL
142366	2002 RD_{230}	—	September 14, 2002	Haleakala	NEAT	·	2.4 km	MPC · JPL
142367	2002 RC_{233}	—	September 14, 2002	Haleakala	R. Matson	·	1.5 km	MPC · JPL
142368 Majden	2002 RH_{233}	Majden	September 14, 2002	Palomar	R. Matson	·	1.3 km	MPC · JPL
142369 Johnhodges	2002 RE_{234}	Johnhodges	September 14, 2002	Palomar	R. Matson	·	1.9 km	MPC · JPL
142370	2002 RZ_{239}	—	September 15, 2002	Palomar	S. F. Hönig	·	1.5 km	MPC · JPL
142371	2002 RB_{240}	—	September 8, 2002	Haleakala	R. Matson	·	1.1 km	MPC · JPL
142372	2002 RN_{243}	—	September 14, 2002	Palomar	NEAT	·	2.5 km	MPC · JPL
142373	2002 RJ_{244}	—	September 14, 2002	Palomar	NEAT	·	1.3 km	MPC · JPL
142374	2002 RX_{246}	—	September 14, 2002	Palomar	NEAT	·	1.6 km	MPC · JPL
142375	2002 RL_{247}	—	September 9, 2002	Palomar	NEAT	·	1.8 km	MPC · JPL
142376	2002 RM_{248}	—	September 14, 2002	Palomar	NEAT	·	1.6 km	MPC · JPL
142377	2002 RW_{249}	—	September 13, 2002	Palomar	NEAT	·	1.8 km	MPC · JPL
142378	2002 SJ_{1}	—	September 27, 2002	Ametlla de Mar	Ametlla de Mar	(5)	1.6 km	MPC · JPL
142379	2002 SN_{3}	—	September 26, 2002	Palomar	NEAT	·	1.4 km	MPC · JPL
142380	2002 SB_{5}	—	September 27, 2002	Palomar	NEAT	(5)	1.9 km	MPC · JPL
142381	2002 SE_{5}	—	September 27, 2002	Palomar	NEAT	MRX	1.8 km	MPC · JPL
142382	2002 SS_{5}	—	September 27, 2002	Palomar	NEAT	(5)	1.8 km	MPC · JPL
142383	2002 SX_{6}	—	September 27, 2002	Palomar	NEAT	NYS	1.8 km	MPC · JPL
142384	2002 SX_{8}	—	September 27, 2002	Palomar	NEAT	·	1.7 km	MPC · JPL
142385	2002 SZ_{8}	—	September 27, 2002	Palomar	NEAT	·	1.7 km	MPC · JPL
142386	2002 SU_{9}	—	September 27, 2002	Palomar	NEAT	EUN	2.2 km	MPC · JPL
142387	2002 SV_{10}	—	September 27, 2002	Palomar	NEAT	·	2.2 km	MPC · JPL
142388	2002 SL_{11}	—	September 27, 2002	Palomar	NEAT	·	2.0 km	MPC · JPL
142389	2002 SQ_{11}	—	September 27, 2002	Palomar	NEAT	·	2.1 km	MPC · JPL
142390	2002 SR_{12}	—	September 27, 2002	Palomar	NEAT	·	2.4 km	MPC · JPL
142391	2002 SY_{13}	—	September 27, 2002	Palomar	NEAT	·	2.1 km	MPC · JPL
142392	2002 SO_{17}	—	September 26, 2002	Palomar	NEAT	·	2.2 km	MPC · JPL
142393	2002 SW_{17}	—	September 26, 2002	Palomar	NEAT	·	2.2 km	MPC · JPL
142394	2002 SK_{18}	—	September 28, 2002	Haleakala	NEAT	V	1.5 km	MPC · JPL
142395	2002 ST_{18}	—	September 26, 2002	Palomar	NEAT	MAS	1 km	MPC · JPL
142396	2002 SW_{18}	—	September 26, 2002	Palomar	NEAT	MAS	1.1 km	MPC · JPL
142397	2002 SM_{19}	—	September 28, 2002	Haleakala	NEAT	·	1.3 km	MPC · JPL
142398	2002 SP_{19}	—	September 28, 2002	Goodricke-Pigott	R. A. Tucker	·	2.8 km	MPC · JPL
142399	2002 SQ_{19}	—	September 28, 2002	Goodricke-Pigott	R. A. Tucker	·	2.3 km	MPC · JPL
142400	2002 SE_{20}	—	September 26, 2002	Palomar	NEAT	MAS	1.3 km	MPC · JPL

== 142401–142500 ==
back to top

Designation			Discovery			Properties		Ref
Permanent	Provisional	Named after	Date	Site	Discoverer(s)	Category	Diam.	Ref
142401 Simonhook	2002 SH_{23}	Simonhook	September 27, 2002	Palomar	NEAT	PHO	1.7 km	MPC · JPL
142402	2002 SH_{24}	—	September 27, 2002	Anderson Mesa	LONEOS	V	1.1 km	MPC · JPL
142403	2002 SQ_{24}	—	September 28, 2002	Palomar	NEAT	·	2.1 km	MPC · JPL
142404	2002 SX_{24}	—	September 28, 2002	Haleakala	NEAT	·	2.5 km	MPC · JPL
142405	2002 SQ_{25}	—	September 28, 2002	Haleakala	NEAT	·	3.3 km	MPC · JPL
142406	2002 SH_{26}	—	September 28, 2002	Haleakala	NEAT	·	2.4 km	MPC · JPL
142407	2002 SA_{27}	—	September 29, 2002	Haleakala	NEAT	·	2.2 km	MPC · JPL
142408 Trebur	2002 SU_{27}	Trebur	September 30, 2002	Michael Adrian	Kretlow, M.	·	2.3 km	MPC · JPL
142409	2002 SJ_{29}	—	September 28, 2002	Palomar	NEAT	NYS	1.6 km	MPC · JPL
142410	2002 SA_{30}	—	September 28, 2002	Haleakala	NEAT	·	2.0 km	MPC · JPL
142411	2002 SC_{30}	—	September 28, 2002	Haleakala	NEAT	·	2.1 km	MPC · JPL
142412	2002 SO_{30}	—	September 28, 2002	Haleakala	NEAT	·	4.0 km	MPC · JPL
142413	2002 SR_{30}	—	September 28, 2002	Haleakala	NEAT	·	1.9 km	MPC · JPL
142414	2002 SS_{31}	—	September 28, 2002	Haleakala	NEAT	·	2.2 km	MPC · JPL
142415	2002 SD_{32}	—	September 28, 2002	Haleakala	NEAT	·	2.3 km	MPC · JPL
142416	2002 SF_{32}	—	September 28, 2002	Haleakala	NEAT	·	2.0 km	MPC · JPL
142417	2002 SX_{32}	—	September 28, 2002	Haleakala	NEAT	·	2.8 km	MPC · JPL
142418	2002 SN_{33}	—	September 28, 2002	Haleakala	NEAT	·	1.9 km	MPC · JPL
142419	2002 SC_{34}	—	September 29, 2002	Haleakala	NEAT	·	2.1 km	MPC · JPL
142420	2002 SQ_{34}	—	September 29, 2002	Haleakala	NEAT	·	3.2 km	MPC · JPL
142421	2002 SW_{35}	—	September 29, 2002	Haleakala	NEAT	EUN	2.3 km	MPC · JPL
142422	2002 SY_{35}	—	September 29, 2002	Haleakala	NEAT	·	2.6 km	MPC · JPL
142423	2002 SZ_{35}	—	September 29, 2002	Haleakala	NEAT	(5)	2.0 km	MPC · JPL
142424	2002 SC_{36}	—	September 29, 2002	Haleakala	NEAT	·	2.1 km	MPC · JPL
142425	2002 SQ_{37}	—	September 29, 2002	Haleakala	NEAT	ADE	3.4 km	MPC · JPL
142426	2002 SH_{39}	—	September 30, 2002	Socorro	LINEAR	·	2.1 km	MPC · JPL
142427	2002 SY_{39}	—	September 30, 2002	Haleakala	NEAT	·	3.2 km	MPC · JPL
142428	2002 SH_{41}	—	September 30, 2002	Haleakala	NEAT	NYS	1.9 km	MPC · JPL
142429	2002 SH_{43}	—	September 28, 2002	Haleakala	NEAT	NYS	1.4 km	MPC · JPL
142430	2002 SA_{44}	—	September 29, 2002	Haleakala	NEAT	·	1.9 km	MPC · JPL
142431	2002 SO_{44}	—	September 29, 2002	Haleakala	NEAT	·	1.8 km	MPC · JPL
142432	2002 SD_{45}	—	September 29, 2002	Haleakala	NEAT	NYS	1.9 km	MPC · JPL
142433	2002 SY_{45}	—	September 29, 2002	Haleakala	NEAT	·	3.1 km	MPC · JPL
142434	2002 SE_{46}	—	September 29, 2002	Haleakala	NEAT	(5)	1.6 km	MPC · JPL
142435	2002 SC_{47}	—	September 30, 2002	Socorro	LINEAR	·	2.1 km	MPC · JPL
142436	2002 SK_{48}	—	September 30, 2002	Socorro	LINEAR	·	2.2 km	MPC · JPL
142437	2002 SA_{49}	—	September 30, 2002	Socorro	LINEAR	·	1.9 km	MPC · JPL
142438	2002 ST_{50}	—	September 30, 2002	Haleakala	NEAT	MAR	2.7 km	MPC · JPL
142439	2002 SW_{53}	—	September 21, 2002	Palomar	NEAT	slow	2.4 km	MPC · JPL
142440	2002 SM_{55}	—	September 30, 2002	Socorro	LINEAR	·	1.9 km	MPC · JPL
142441	2002 SQ_{55}	—	September 30, 2002	Socorro	LINEAR	V	1.3 km	MPC · JPL
142442	2002 SQ_{56}	—	September 30, 2002	Socorro	LINEAR	·	1.9 km	MPC · JPL
142443	2002 SW_{56}	—	September 30, 2002	Socorro	LINEAR	·	2.5 km	MPC · JPL
142444	2002 SL_{57}	—	September 30, 2002	Haleakala	NEAT	·	2.1 km	MPC · JPL
142445	2002 SR_{58}	—	September 30, 2002	Socorro	LINEAR	MAS	990 m	MPC · JPL
142446	2002 SV_{58}	—	September 30, 2002	Socorro	LINEAR	·	1.9 km	MPC · JPL
142447	2002 ST_{59}	—	September 16, 2002	Haleakala	NEAT	·	1.9 km	MPC · JPL
142448	2002 SS_{60}	—	September 16, 2002	Palomar	NEAT	·	1.9 km	MPC · JPL
142449	2002 TB	—	October 1, 2002	Ondřejov	P. Pravec	·	3.1 km	MPC · JPL
142450	2002 TV	—	October 1, 2002	Anderson Mesa	LONEOS	·	2.0 km	MPC · JPL
142451	2002 TG_{1}	—	October 1, 2002	Anderson Mesa	LONEOS	·	1.5 km	MPC · JPL
142452	2002 TP_{1}	—	October 1, 2002	Anderson Mesa	LONEOS	·	3.5 km	MPC · JPL
142453	2002 TS_{1}	—	October 1, 2002	Anderson Mesa	LONEOS	·	2.2 km	MPC · JPL
142454	2002 TW_{1}	—	October 1, 2002	Anderson Mesa	LONEOS	·	1.8 km	MPC · JPL
142455	2002 TT_{2}	—	October 1, 2002	Anderson Mesa	LONEOS	V	1.3 km	MPC · JPL
142456	2002 TQ_{3}	—	October 1, 2002	Anderson Mesa	LONEOS	·	2.8 km	MPC · JPL
142457	2002 TX_{4}	—	October 1, 2002	Socorro	LINEAR	·	3.1 km	MPC · JPL
142458	2002 TZ_{5}	—	October 1, 2002	Anderson Mesa	LONEOS	NYS	2.4 km	MPC · JPL
142459	2002 TD_{6}	—	October 1, 2002	Socorro	LINEAR	·	2.1 km	MPC · JPL
142460	2002 TJ_{6}	—	October 1, 2002	Anderson Mesa	LONEOS	·	3.0 km	MPC · JPL
142461	2002 TD_{7}	—	October 1, 2002	Anderson Mesa	LONEOS	·	3.0 km	MPC · JPL
142462	2002 TT_{7}	—	October 1, 2002	Haleakala	NEAT	·	2.1 km	MPC · JPL
142463	2002 TH_{8}	—	October 1, 2002	Haleakala	NEAT	·	1.7 km	MPC · JPL
142464	2002 TC_{9}	—	October 2, 2002	Socorro	LINEAR	AMO	890 m	MPC · JPL
142465	2002 TJ_{9}	—	October 1, 2002	Anderson Mesa	LONEOS	·	2.1 km	MPC · JPL
142466	2002 TO_{9}	—	October 1, 2002	Socorro	LINEAR	·	2.4 km	MPC · JPL
142467	2002 TV_{9}	—	October 1, 2002	Anderson Mesa	LONEOS	·	2.1 km	MPC · JPL
142468	2002 TU_{11}	—	October 1, 2002	Anderson Mesa	LONEOS	·	2.1 km	MPC · JPL
142469	2002 TY_{11}	—	October 1, 2002	Anderson Mesa	LONEOS	·	2.2 km	MPC · JPL
142470	2002 TE_{13}	—	October 1, 2002	Anderson Mesa	LONEOS	3:2 · SHU	7.8 km	MPC · JPL
142471	2002 TN_{13}	—	October 1, 2002	Anderson Mesa	LONEOS	·	1.9 km	MPC · JPL
142472	2002 TH_{14}	—	October 1, 2002	Socorro	LINEAR	·	2.0 km	MPC · JPL
142473	2002 TF_{15}	—	October 1, 2002	Kleť	Kleť	·	2.0 km	MPC · JPL
142474	2002 TF_{17}	—	October 2, 2002	Socorro	LINEAR	·	2.0 km	MPC · JPL
142475	2002 TG_{17}	—	October 2, 2002	Socorro	LINEAR	·	5.1 km	MPC · JPL
142476	2002 TW_{17}	—	October 2, 2002	Socorro	LINEAR	·	2.2 km	MPC · JPL
142477	2002 TT_{19}	—	October 2, 2002	Socorro	LINEAR	·	1.6 km	MPC · JPL
142478	2002 TB_{20}	—	October 2, 2002	Socorro	LINEAR	·	1.5 km	MPC · JPL
142479	2002 TB_{21}	—	October 2, 2002	Socorro	LINEAR	·	3.2 km	MPC · JPL
142480	2002 TP_{21}	—	October 2, 2002	Socorro	LINEAR	·	2.2 km	MPC · JPL
142481	2002 TU_{22}	—	October 2, 2002	Socorro	LINEAR	·	2.7 km	MPC · JPL
142482	2002 TX_{22}	—	October 2, 2002	Socorro	LINEAR	V	1.1 km	MPC · JPL
142483	2002 TQ_{24}	—	October 2, 2002	Socorro	LINEAR	·	2.8 km	MPC · JPL
142484	2002 TY_{24}	—	October 2, 2002	Socorro	LINEAR	·	2.2 km	MPC · JPL
142485	2002 TJ_{25}	—	October 2, 2002	Socorro	LINEAR	V	1.4 km	MPC · JPL
142486	2002 TK_{25}	—	October 2, 2002	Socorro	LINEAR	·	1.9 km	MPC · JPL
142487	2002 TC_{27}	—	October 2, 2002	Socorro	LINEAR	·	4.1 km	MPC · JPL
142488	2002 TK_{27}	—	October 2, 2002	Socorro	LINEAR	·	1.7 km	MPC · JPL
142489	2002 TO_{28}	—	October 2, 2002	Socorro	LINEAR	NYS	2.3 km	MPC · JPL
142490	2002 TU_{28}	—	October 2, 2002	Socorro	LINEAR	NYS	2.2 km	MPC · JPL
142491	2002 TB_{29}	—	October 2, 2002	Socorro	LINEAR	·	2.4 km	MPC · JPL
142492	2002 TC_{29}	—	October 2, 2002	Socorro	LINEAR	·	2.4 km	MPC · JPL
142493	2002 TY_{29}	—	October 2, 2002	Socorro	LINEAR	(5)	1.8 km	MPC · JPL
142494	2002 TG_{30}	—	October 2, 2002	Socorro	LINEAR	·	3.1 km	MPC · JPL
142495	2002 TP_{30}	—	October 2, 2002	Socorro	LINEAR	NYS	1.9 km	MPC · JPL
142496	2002 TK_{31}	—	October 2, 2002	Socorro	LINEAR	·	2.1 km	MPC · JPL
142497	2002 TL_{31}	—	October 2, 2002	Socorro	LINEAR	(5)	1.7 km	MPC · JPL
142498	2002 TY_{31}	—	October 2, 2002	Socorro	LINEAR	·	2.1 km	MPC · JPL
142499	2002 TE_{32}	—	October 2, 2002	Socorro	LINEAR	·	2.4 km	MPC · JPL
142500	2002 TM_{32}	—	October 2, 2002	Socorro	LINEAR	·	1.4 km	MPC · JPL

== 142501–142600 ==
back to top

Designation			Discovery			Properties		Ref
Permanent	Provisional	Named after	Date	Site	Discoverer(s)	Category	Diam.	Ref
142501	2002 TX_{32}	—	October 2, 2002	Socorro	LINEAR	·	1.8 km	MPC · JPL
142502	2002 TA_{34}	—	October 2, 2002	Socorro	LINEAR	·	1.6 km	MPC · JPL
142503	2002 TT_{34}	—	October 2, 2002	Socorro	LINEAR	·	2.2 km	MPC · JPL
142504	2002 TS_{35}	—	October 2, 2002	Socorro	LINEAR	·	3.2 km	MPC · JPL
142505	2002 TT_{35}	—	October 2, 2002	Socorro	LINEAR	·	1.7 km	MPC · JPL
142506	2002 TC_{36}	—	October 2, 2002	Socorro	LINEAR	·	4.6 km	MPC · JPL
142507	2002 TN_{36}	—	October 2, 2002	Socorro	LINEAR	·	3.1 km	MPC · JPL
142508	2002 TP_{36}	—	October 2, 2002	Socorro	LINEAR	HNS	2.0 km	MPC · JPL
142509	2002 TJ_{37}	—	October 2, 2002	Socorro	LINEAR	·	1.7 km	MPC · JPL
142510	2002 TM_{37}	—	October 2, 2002	Socorro	LINEAR	·	1.7 km	MPC · JPL
142511	2002 TE_{38}	—	October 2, 2002	Socorro	LINEAR	·	2.1 km	MPC · JPL
142512	2002 TG_{39}	—	October 2, 2002	Socorro	LINEAR	RAF	2.1 km	MPC · JPL
142513	2002 TK_{39}	—	October 2, 2002	Socorro	LINEAR	·	4.1 km	MPC · JPL
142514	2002 TU_{39}	—	October 2, 2002	Socorro	LINEAR	·	2.6 km	MPC · JPL
142515	2002 TZ_{39}	—	October 2, 2002	Socorro	LINEAR	ADE	5.6 km	MPC · JPL
142516	2002 TD_{40}	—	October 2, 2002	Socorro	LINEAR	·	2.6 km	MPC · JPL
142517	2002 TJ_{40}	—	October 2, 2002	Socorro	LINEAR	·	2.9 km	MPC · JPL
142518	2002 TP_{40}	—	October 2, 2002	Socorro	LINEAR	·	2.7 km	MPC · JPL
142519	2002 TJ_{41}	—	October 2, 2002	Socorro	LINEAR	·	1.6 km	MPC · JPL
142520	2002 TO_{41}	—	October 2, 2002	Socorro	LINEAR	·	1.5 km	MPC · JPL
142521	2002 TL_{42}	—	October 2, 2002	Socorro	LINEAR	·	2.7 km	MPC · JPL
142522	2002 TM_{43}	—	October 2, 2002	Socorro	LINEAR	(5)	2.1 km	MPC · JPL
142523	2002 TO_{43}	—	October 2, 2002	Socorro	LINEAR	MAS	1.0 km	MPC · JPL
142524	2002 TT_{44}	—	October 2, 2002	Socorro	LINEAR	·	1.6 km	MPC · JPL
142525	2002 TA_{45}	—	October 2, 2002	Socorro	LINEAR	·	1.9 km	MPC · JPL
142526	2002 TD_{45}	—	October 2, 2002	Socorro	LINEAR	·	3.0 km	MPC · JPL
142527	2002 TF_{45}	—	October 2, 2002	Socorro	LINEAR	·	2.3 km	MPC · JPL
142528	2002 TL_{45}	—	October 2, 2002	Socorro	LINEAR	·	2.2 km	MPC · JPL
142529	2002 TG_{47}	—	October 2, 2002	Socorro	LINEAR	ADE	3.7 km	MPC · JPL
142530	2002 TL_{47}	—	October 2, 2002	Socorro	LINEAR	·	3.7 km	MPC · JPL
142531	2002 TN_{47}	—	October 2, 2002	Socorro	LINEAR	·	2.4 km	MPC · JPL
142532	2002 TU_{47}	—	October 2, 2002	Socorro	LINEAR	·	3.4 km	MPC · JPL
142533	2002 TR_{48}	—	October 2, 2002	Socorro	LINEAR	·	1.6 km	MPC · JPL
142534	2002 TY_{48}	—	October 2, 2002	Socorro	LINEAR	·	4.3 km	MPC · JPL
142535	2002 TD_{49}	—	October 2, 2002	Socorro	LINEAR	·	1.9 km	MPC · JPL
142536	2002 TE_{49}	—	October 2, 2002	Socorro	LINEAR	·	4.3 km	MPC · JPL
142537	2002 TV_{50}	—	October 2, 2002	Socorro	LINEAR	MAR	2.6 km	MPC · JPL
142538	2002 TX_{50}	—	October 2, 2002	Socorro	LINEAR	·	2.0 km	MPC · JPL
142539	2002 TD_{51}	—	October 2, 2002	Socorro	LINEAR	·	2.5 km	MPC · JPL
142540	2002 TN_{51}	—	October 2, 2002	Socorro	LINEAR	·	2.7 km	MPC · JPL
142541	2002 TR_{51}	—	October 2, 2002	Socorro	LINEAR	(5)	3.1 km	MPC · JPL
142542	2002 TS_{51}	—	October 2, 2002	Socorro	LINEAR	·	1.8 km	MPC · JPL
142543	2002 TT_{51}	—	October 2, 2002	Socorro	LINEAR	·	2.7 km	MPC · JPL
142544	2002 TB_{52}	—	October 2, 2002	Socorro	LINEAR	GEF	2.0 km	MPC · JPL
142545	2002 TK_{52}	—	October 2, 2002	Socorro	LINEAR	·	2.2 km	MPC · JPL
142546	2002 TS_{52}	—	October 2, 2002	Socorro	LINEAR	·	2.9 km	MPC · JPL
142547	2002 TT_{52}	—	October 2, 2002	Socorro	LINEAR	fast	1.9 km	MPC · JPL
142548	2002 TG_{53}	—	October 2, 2002	Socorro	LINEAR	·	2.2 km	MPC · JPL
142549	2002 TJ_{53}	—	October 2, 2002	Socorro	LINEAR	·	5.8 km	MPC · JPL
142550	2002 TK_{53}	—	October 2, 2002	Socorro	LINEAR	(5)	2.1 km	MPC · JPL
142551	2002 TV_{53}	—	October 2, 2002	Socorro	LINEAR	(5)	3.8 km	MPC · JPL
142552	2002 TO_{54}	—	October 2, 2002	Socorro	LINEAR	·	1.8 km	MPC · JPL
142553	2002 TX_{54}	—	October 2, 2002	Socorro	LINEAR	·	2.7 km	MPC · JPL
142554	2002 TX_{56}	—	October 2, 2002	Haleakala	NEAT	MAR	1.8 km	MPC · JPL
142555	2002 TB_{58}	—	October 3, 2002	Socorro	LINEAR	AMO +1km	1.9 km	MPC · JPL
142556	2002 TK_{58}	—	October 1, 2002	Anderson Mesa	LONEOS	·	2.4 km	MPC · JPL
142557	2002 TS_{60}	—	October 5, 2002	Socorro	LINEAR	·	3.6 km	MPC · JPL
142558 Rosarno	2002 TP_{61}	Rosarno	October 3, 2002	Campo Imperatore	CINEOS	V	1.1 km	MPC · JPL
142559	2002 TO_{64}	—	October 5, 2002	Fountain Hills	C. W. Juels, P. R. Holvorcem	EUN	3.0 km	MPC · JPL
142560	2002 TW_{67}	—	October 5, 2002	Socorro	LINEAR	HNS	3.5 km	MPC · JPL
142561	2002 TX_{68}	—	October 8, 2002	Palomar	NEAT	AMO +1km	810 m	MPC · JPL
142562 Graetz	2002 TL_{69}	Graetz	October 10, 2002	Michael Adrian	Kretlow, M.	·	1.9 km	MPC · JPL
142563	2002 TR_{69}	—	October 10, 2002	Socorro	LINEAR	AMO +1km	860 m	MPC · JPL
142564	2002 TR_{70}	—	October 3, 2002	Palomar	NEAT	EUN	2.2 km	MPC · JPL
142565	2002 TN_{75}	—	October 1, 2002	Anderson Mesa	LONEOS	·	3.6 km	MPC · JPL
142566	2002 TH_{77}	—	October 1, 2002	Anderson Mesa	LONEOS	(5)	1.5 km	MPC · JPL
142567	2002 TQ_{78}	—	October 1, 2002	Socorro	LINEAR	HNS	1.8 km	MPC · JPL
142568	2002 TV_{78}	—	October 1, 2002	Socorro	LINEAR	(5)	2.8 km	MPC · JPL
142569	2002 TA_{79}	—	October 1, 2002	Socorro	LINEAR	·	5.3 km	MPC · JPL
142570	2002 TG_{79}	—	October 1, 2002	Socorro	LINEAR	·	1.7 km	MPC · JPL
142571	2002 TA_{80}	—	October 1, 2002	Socorro	LINEAR	·	2.6 km	MPC · JPL
142572	2002 TG_{81}	—	October 1, 2002	Socorro	LINEAR	·	3.5 km	MPC · JPL
142573	2002 TC_{82}	—	October 1, 2002	Haleakala	NEAT	·	2.7 km	MPC · JPL
142574	2002 TS_{82}	—	October 2, 2002	Socorro	LINEAR	·	2.4 km	MPC · JPL
142575	2002 TP_{85}	—	October 2, 2002	Haleakala	NEAT	GEF	2.4 km	MPC · JPL
142576	2002 TZ_{85}	—	October 2, 2002	Campo Imperatore	CINEOS	·	1.9 km	MPC · JPL
142577	2002 TC_{86}	—	October 2, 2002	Campo Imperatore	CINEOS	(5)	1.8 km	MPC · JPL
142578	2002 TB_{88}	—	October 3, 2002	Socorro	LINEAR	·	1.6 km	MPC · JPL
142579	2002 TK_{88}	—	October 3, 2002	Palomar	NEAT	·	2.2 km	MPC · JPL
142580	2002 TM_{89}	—	October 3, 2002	Palomar	NEAT	·	3.6 km	MPC · JPL
142581	2002 TH_{90}	—	October 3, 2002	Palomar	NEAT	HOF	3.7 km	MPC · JPL
142582	2002 TE_{95}	—	October 3, 2002	Socorro	LINEAR	·	2.5 km	MPC · JPL
142583	2002 TE_{96}	—	October 3, 2002	Socorro	LINEAR	·	4.4 km	MPC · JPL
142584	2002 TF_{96}	—	October 3, 2002	Socorro	LINEAR	·	5.9 km	MPC · JPL
142585	2002 TH_{96}	—	October 3, 2002	Palomar	NEAT	·	6.9 km	MPC · JPL
142586	2002 TL_{100}	—	October 4, 2002	Socorro	LINEAR	·	2.2 km	MPC · JPL
142587	2002 TZ_{101}	—	October 4, 2002	Socorro	LINEAR	·	2.2 km	MPC · JPL
142588	2002 TD_{102}	—	October 4, 2002	Socorro	LINEAR	·	2.6 km	MPC · JPL
142589	2002 TY_{103}	—	October 4, 2002	Socorro	LINEAR	·	2.2 km	MPC · JPL
142590	2002 TB_{105}	—	October 4, 2002	Socorro	LINEAR	·	1.2 km	MPC · JPL
142591	2002 TG_{108}	—	October 1, 2002	Socorro	LINEAR	·	4.5 km	MPC · JPL
142592	2002 TL_{108}	—	October 1, 2002	Haleakala	NEAT	·	2.3 km	MPC · JPL
142593	2002 TK_{109}	—	October 2, 2002	Haleakala	NEAT	NYS	1.9 km	MPC · JPL
142594	2002 TZ_{109}	—	October 2, 2002	Haleakala	NEAT	PHO	2.5 km	MPC · JPL
142595	2002 TF_{111}	—	October 2, 2002	Campo Imperatore	CINEOS	EUN	2.3 km	MPC · JPL
142596	2002 TG_{112}	—	October 3, 2002	Socorro	LINEAR	·	1.9 km	MPC · JPL
142597	2002 TQ_{112}	—	October 3, 2002	Socorro	LINEAR	MAS	1.3 km	MPC · JPL
142598	2002 TY_{112}	—	October 3, 2002	Palomar	NEAT	·	3.9 km	MPC · JPL
142599	2002 TY_{115}	—	October 3, 2002	Palomar	NEAT	EUN	1.9 km	MPC · JPL
142600	2002 TG_{116}	—	October 3, 2002	Palomar	NEAT	·	2.6 km	MPC · JPL

== 142601–142700 ==
back to top

Designation			Discovery			Properties		Ref
Permanent	Provisional	Named after	Date	Site	Discoverer(s)	Category	Diam.	Ref
142601	2002 TF_{117}	—	October 3, 2002	Palomar	NEAT	EUN	2.2 km	MPC · JPL
142602	2002 TB_{118}	—	October 3, 2002	Palomar	NEAT	·	1.8 km	MPC · JPL
142603	2002 TR_{124}	—	October 4, 2002	Socorro	LINEAR	·	5.7 km	MPC · JPL
142604	2002 TJ_{125}	—	October 4, 2002	Socorro	LINEAR	·	1.9 km	MPC · JPL
142605	2002 TQ_{125}	—	October 4, 2002	Palomar	NEAT	V	1.3 km	MPC · JPL
142606	2002 TX_{125}	—	October 4, 2002	Socorro	LINEAR	·	1.7 km	MPC · JPL
142607	2002 TC_{126}	—	October 4, 2002	Palomar	NEAT	ADE	5.2 km	MPC · JPL
142608	2002 TE_{126}	—	October 4, 2002	Palomar	NEAT	MAR	1.8 km	MPC · JPL
142609	2002 TJ_{131}	—	October 4, 2002	Socorro	LINEAR	·	2.7 km	MPC · JPL
142610	2002 TU_{132}	—	October 4, 2002	Socorro	LINEAR	·	1.7 km	MPC · JPL
142611	2002 TT_{135}	—	October 4, 2002	Anderson Mesa	LONEOS	MAR	2.3 km	MPC · JPL
142612	2002 TQ_{136}	—	October 4, 2002	Anderson Mesa	LONEOS	EUN	2.4 km	MPC · JPL
142613	2002 TH_{137}	—	October 4, 2002	Anderson Mesa	LONEOS	·	3.2 km	MPC · JPL
142614	2002 TV_{138}	—	October 4, 2002	Anderson Mesa	LONEOS	·	1.5 km	MPC · JPL
142615	2002 TW_{138}	—	October 4, 2002	Anderson Mesa	LONEOS	·	2.6 km	MPC · JPL
142616	2002 TX_{143}	—	October 4, 2002	Socorro	LINEAR	·	2.3 km	MPC · JPL
142617	2002 TE_{146}	—	October 4, 2002	Socorro	LINEAR	·	3.1 km	MPC · JPL
142618	2002 TF_{146}	—	October 4, 2002	Socorro	LINEAR	·	2.0 km	MPC · JPL
142619	2002 TR_{146}	—	October 4, 2002	Socorro	LINEAR	·	1.6 km	MPC · JPL
142620	2002 TL_{154}	—	October 5, 2002	Socorro	LINEAR	·	1.6 km	MPC · JPL
142621	2002 TU_{157}	—	October 5, 2002	Palomar	NEAT	·	1.9 km	MPC · JPL
142622	2002 TK_{158}	—	October 5, 2002	Palomar	NEAT	·	2.4 km	MPC · JPL
142623	2002 TT_{160}	—	October 5, 2002	Palomar	NEAT	·	3.9 km	MPC · JPL
142624	2002 TU_{160}	—	October 5, 2002	Palomar	NEAT	·	3.3 km	MPC · JPL
142625	2002 TO_{165}	—	October 2, 2002	Haleakala	NEAT	·	2.2 km	MPC · JPL
142626	2002 TQ_{168}	—	October 3, 2002	Palomar	NEAT	·	4.6 km	MPC · JPL
142627	2002 TZ_{169}	—	October 3, 2002	Palomar	NEAT	·	2.2 km	MPC · JPL
142628	2002 TL_{171}	—	October 3, 2002	Palomar	NEAT	·	2.3 km	MPC · JPL
142629	2002 TU_{173}	—	October 4, 2002	Socorro	LINEAR	·	2.6 km	MPC · JPL
142630	2002 TV_{175}	—	October 4, 2002	Socorro	LINEAR	·	3.2 km	MPC · JPL
142631	2002 TX_{175}	—	October 4, 2002	Anderson Mesa	LONEOS	·	2.7 km	MPC · JPL
142632	2002 TU_{177}	—	October 11, 2002	Palomar	NEAT	HNS	2.5 km	MPC · JPL
142633	2002 TC_{178}	—	October 11, 2002	Palomar	NEAT	·	3.0 km	MPC · JPL
142634	2002 TL_{179}	—	October 13, 2002	Palomar	NEAT	·	2.4 km	MPC · JPL
142635	2002 TY_{179}	—	October 14, 2002	Socorro	LINEAR	·	3.5 km	MPC · JPL
142636	2002 TS_{181}	—	October 3, 2002	Socorro	LINEAR	·	2.6 km	MPC · JPL
142637	2002 TL_{183}	—	October 4, 2002	Socorro	LINEAR	NYS	2.0 km	MPC · JPL
142638	2002 TN_{184}	—	October 4, 2002	Socorro	LINEAR	·	2.1 km	MPC · JPL
142639	2002 TO_{186}	—	October 4, 2002	Socorro	LINEAR	·	2.6 km	MPC · JPL
142640	2002 TK_{187}	—	October 4, 2002	Socorro	LINEAR	·	3.6 km	MPC · JPL
142641	2002 TU_{187}	—	October 4, 2002	Socorro	LINEAR	·	1.5 km	MPC · JPL
142642	2002 TX_{187}	—	October 4, 2002	Socorro	LINEAR	·	2.8 km	MPC · JPL
142643	2002 TS_{188}	—	October 4, 2002	Socorro	LINEAR	RAF	1.5 km	MPC · JPL
142644	2002 TT_{188}	—	October 4, 2002	Socorro	LINEAR	·	2.0 km	MPC · JPL
142645	2002 TX_{188}	—	October 4, 2002	Socorro	LINEAR	·	2.2 km	MPC · JPL
142646	2002 TG_{190}	—	October 14, 2002	Farpoint	G. Hug	·	2.7 km	MPC · JPL
142647	2002 TH_{190}	—	October 14, 2002	Farpoint	G. Hug	ADE	3.6 km	MPC · JPL
142648	2002 TC_{191}	—	October 1, 2002	Socorro	LINEAR	·	4.7 km	MPC · JPL
142649	2002 TA_{192}	—	October 5, 2002	Anderson Mesa	LONEOS	·	3.8 km	MPC · JPL
142650	2002 TH_{192}	—	October 5, 2002	Anderson Mesa	LONEOS	·	2.4 km	MPC · JPL
142651	2002 TR_{192}	—	October 5, 2002	Anderson Mesa	LONEOS	EUN	2.1 km	MPC · JPL
142652	2002 TY_{196}	—	October 4, 2002	Socorro	LINEAR	·	2.3 km	MPC · JPL
142653	2002 TM_{197}	—	October 4, 2002	Socorro	LINEAR	·	3.2 km	MPC · JPL
142654	2002 TP_{200}	—	October 4, 2002	Socorro	LINEAR	V	1.3 km	MPC · JPL
142655	2002 TB_{203}	—	October 4, 2002	Socorro	LINEAR	·	2.2 km	MPC · JPL
142656	2002 TF_{203}	—	October 4, 2002	Socorro	LINEAR	·	2.0 km	MPC · JPL
142657	2002 TJ_{203}	—	October 4, 2002	Socorro	LINEAR	·	1.8 km	MPC · JPL
142658	2002 TY_{203}	—	October 4, 2002	Socorro	LINEAR	MAR	2.3 km	MPC · JPL
142659	2002 TH_{206}	—	October 4, 2002	Socorro	LINEAR	·	1.7 km	MPC · JPL
142660	2002 TC_{207}	—	October 4, 2002	Socorro	LINEAR	(5)	3.4 km	MPC · JPL
142661	2002 TU_{207}	—	October 4, 2002	Socorro	LINEAR	·	5.1 km	MPC · JPL
142662	2002 TN_{208}	—	October 4, 2002	Socorro	LINEAR	·	2.1 km	MPC · JPL
142663	2002 TD_{209}	—	October 6, 2002	Socorro	LINEAR	·	2.6 km	MPC · JPL
142664	2002 TK_{210}	—	October 7, 2002	Socorro	LINEAR	·	2.4 km	MPC · JPL
142665	2002 TK_{212}	—	October 7, 2002	Haleakala	NEAT	·	3.0 km	MPC · JPL
142666	2002 TR_{213}	—	October 3, 2002	Socorro	LINEAR	·	1.4 km	MPC · JPL
142667	2002 TB_{214}	—	October 3, 2002	Socorro	LINEAR	·	2.2 km	MPC · JPL
142668	2002 TG_{214}	—	October 4, 2002	Socorro	LINEAR	·	2.0 km	MPC · JPL
142669	2002 TU_{218}	—	October 5, 2002	Socorro	LINEAR	·	1.7 km	MPC · JPL
142670	2002 TN_{219}	—	October 5, 2002	Socorro	LINEAR	·	3.1 km	MPC · JPL
142671	2002 TV_{219}	—	October 5, 2002	Socorro	LINEAR	·	3.7 km	MPC · JPL
142672	2002 TW_{219}	—	October 5, 2002	Socorro	LINEAR	·	4.1 km	MPC · JPL
142673	2002 TY_{219}	—	October 5, 2002	Palomar	NEAT	·	2.1 km	MPC · JPL
142674	2002 TB_{221}	—	October 6, 2002	Socorro	LINEAR	·	3.8 km	MPC · JPL
142675	2002 TN_{222}	—	October 7, 2002	Socorro	LINEAR	·	3.4 km	MPC · JPL
142676	2002 TU_{223}	—	October 7, 2002	Anderson Mesa	LONEOS	NYS	1.8 km	MPC · JPL
142677	2002 TA_{224}	—	October 8, 2002	Anderson Mesa	LONEOS	·	2.4 km	MPC · JPL
142678	2002 TC_{224}	—	October 8, 2002	Anderson Mesa	LONEOS	·	2.1 km	MPC · JPL
142679	2002 TT_{225}	—	October 8, 2002	Anderson Mesa	LONEOS	·	1.8 km	MPC · JPL
142680	2002 TF_{227}	—	October 8, 2002	Anderson Mesa	LONEOS	·	2.6 km	MPC · JPL
142681	2002 TM_{228}	—	October 7, 2002	Socorro	LINEAR	·	2.4 km	MPC · JPL
142682	2002 TR_{228}	—	October 7, 2002	Haleakala	NEAT	MAR	1.5 km	MPC · JPL
142683	2002 TC_{232}	—	October 6, 2002	Socorro	LINEAR	·	2.2 km	MPC · JPL
142684	2002 TN_{232}	—	October 6, 2002	Socorro	LINEAR	MAR	2.1 km	MPC · JPL
142685	2002 TL_{233}	—	October 6, 2002	Socorro	LINEAR	·	3.1 km	MPC · JPL
142686	2002 TJ_{235}	—	October 6, 2002	Socorro	LINEAR	·	4.0 km	MPC · JPL
142687	2002 TX_{235}	—	October 6, 2002	Socorro	LINEAR	·	2.6 km	MPC · JPL
142688	2002 TU_{238}	—	October 7, 2002	Socorro	LINEAR	·	3.8 km	MPC · JPL
142689	2002 TL_{240}	—	October 9, 2002	Socorro	LINEAR	·	5.4 km	MPC · JPL
142690	2002 TR_{241}	—	October 7, 2002	Haleakala	NEAT	·	2.0 km	MPC · JPL
142691	2002 TT_{241}	—	October 7, 2002	Haleakala	NEAT	·	2.8 km	MPC · JPL
142692	2002 TY_{242}	—	October 9, 2002	Socorro	LINEAR	(5)	1.8 km	MPC · JPL
142693	2002 TZ_{242}	—	October 9, 2002	Socorro	LINEAR	·	2.0 km	MPC · JPL
142694	2002 TW_{243}	—	October 9, 2002	Socorro	LINEAR	·	1.3 km	MPC · JPL
142695	2002 TU_{245}	—	October 9, 2002	Anderson Mesa	LONEOS	·	2.0 km	MPC · JPL
142696	2002 TM_{246}	—	October 9, 2002	Socorro	LINEAR	·	2.2 km	MPC · JPL
142697	2002 TT_{246}	—	October 9, 2002	Socorro	LINEAR	·	1.6 km	MPC · JPL
142698	2002 TO_{248}	—	October 7, 2002	Palomar	NEAT	·	1.8 km	MPC · JPL
142699	2002 TU_{251}	—	October 8, 2002	Anderson Mesa	LONEOS	·	1.8 km	MPC · JPL
142700	2002 TK_{254}	—	October 9, 2002	Anderson Mesa	LONEOS	·	4.8 km	MPC · JPL

== 142701–142800 ==
back to top

Designation			Discovery			Properties		Ref
Permanent	Provisional	Named after	Date	Site	Discoverer(s)	Category	Diam.	Ref
142701	2002 TL_{254}	—	October 9, 2002	Anderson Mesa	LONEOS	·	2.2 km	MPC · JPL
142702	2002 TY_{254}	—	October 9, 2002	Anderson Mesa	LONEOS	(5)	1.9 km	MPC · JPL
142703	2002 TJ_{256}	—	October 9, 2002	Socorro	LINEAR	(12739)	2.5 km	MPC · JPL
142704	2002 TM_{256}	—	October 9, 2002	Socorro	LINEAR	·	2.2 km	MPC · JPL
142705	2002 TE_{257}	—	October 9, 2002	Socorro	LINEAR	PAD	3.0 km	MPC · JPL
142706	2002 TB_{258}	—	October 9, 2002	Socorro	LINEAR	(5)	2.2 km	MPC · JPL
142707	2002 TV_{259}	—	October 9, 2002	Socorro	LINEAR	(5)	1.5 km	MPC · JPL
142708	2002 TH_{260}	—	October 9, 2002	Socorro	LINEAR	(5)	1.6 km	MPC · JPL
142709	2002 TS_{260}	—	October 9, 2002	Socorro	LINEAR	JUN	1.8 km	MPC · JPL
142710	2002 TO_{261}	—	October 9, 2002	Kitt Peak	Spacewatch	·	3.5 km	MPC · JPL
142711	2002 TE_{263}	—	October 10, 2002	Socorro	LINEAR	·	2.4 km	MPC · JPL
142712	2002 TQ_{264}	—	October 10, 2002	Socorro	LINEAR	·	1.5 km	MPC · JPL
142713	2002 TW_{264}	—	October 10, 2002	Socorro	LINEAR	·	2.6 km	MPC · JPL
142714	2002 TQ_{265}	—	October 10, 2002	Socorro	LINEAR	(5)	2.6 km	MPC · JPL
142715	2002 TJ_{266}	—	October 10, 2002	Socorro	LINEAR	EUN	3.2 km	MPC · JPL
142716	2002 TU_{266}	—	October 10, 2002	Socorro	LINEAR	(5)	2.0 km	MPC · JPL
142717	2002 TC_{270}	—	October 9, 2002	Socorro	LINEAR	·	3.6 km	MPC · JPL
142718	2002 TF_{275}	—	October 9, 2002	Socorro	LINEAR	·	3.6 km	MPC · JPL
142719	2002 TZ_{276}	—	October 9, 2002	Socorro	LINEAR	·	2.2 km	MPC · JPL
142720	2002 TJ_{277}	—	October 10, 2002	Palomar	NEAT	·	2.2 km	MPC · JPL
142721	2002 TJ_{279}	—	October 10, 2002	Socorro	LINEAR	·	3.3 km	MPC · JPL
142722	2002 TO_{279}	—	October 10, 2002	Socorro	LINEAR	HNS	1.9 km	MPC · JPL
142723	2002 TW_{279}	—	October 10, 2002	Socorro	LINEAR	·	3.5 km	MPC · JPL
142724	2002 TY_{279}	—	October 10, 2002	Socorro	LINEAR	·	3.1 km	MPC · JPL
142725	2002 TC_{281}	—	October 10, 2002	Socorro	LINEAR	·	3.3 km	MPC · JPL
142726	2002 TH_{281}	—	October 10, 2002	Socorro	LINEAR	·	2.0 km	MPC · JPL
142727	2002 TN_{283}	—	October 10, 2002	Socorro	LINEAR	MAR	2.7 km	MPC · JPL
142728	2002 TQ_{283}	—	October 10, 2002	Socorro	LINEAR	·	4.2 km	MPC · JPL
142729	2002 TD_{284}	—	October 10, 2002	Socorro	LINEAR	·	2.6 km	MPC · JPL
142730	2002 TN_{284}	—	October 10, 2002	Socorro	LINEAR	RAF	2.0 km	MPC · JPL
142731	2002 TA_{285}	—	October 10, 2002	Socorro	LINEAR	MAR	2.2 km	MPC · JPL
142732	2002 TZ_{285}	—	October 10, 2002	Socorro	LINEAR	·	2.8 km	MPC · JPL
142733	2002 TO_{286}	—	October 10, 2002	Socorro	LINEAR	·	2.6 km	MPC · JPL
142734	2002 TS_{286}	—	October 10, 2002	Socorro	LINEAR	HNS	2.0 km	MPC · JPL
142735	2002 TV_{286}	—	October 10, 2002	Socorro	LINEAR	·	3.4 km	MPC · JPL
142736	2002 TJ_{289}	—	October 10, 2002	Socorro	LINEAR	·	2.4 km	MPC · JPL
142737	2002 TB_{290}	—	October 10, 2002	Socorro	LINEAR	·	2.9 km	MPC · JPL
142738	2002 TD_{290}	—	October 10, 2002	Socorro	LINEAR	·	6.3 km	MPC · JPL
142739	2002 TK_{290}	—	October 10, 2002	Socorro	LINEAR	(23255)	5.8 km	MPC · JPL
142740	2002 TC_{291}	—	October 10, 2002	Socorro	LINEAR	AGN	2.1 km	MPC · JPL
142741	2002 TE_{291}	—	October 10, 2002	Socorro	LINEAR	·	1.4 km	MPC · JPL
142742	2002 TZ_{291}	—	October 10, 2002	Socorro	LINEAR	EUN	2.4 km	MPC · JPL
142743	2002 TD_{292}	—	October 10, 2002	Socorro	LINEAR	(5)	1.8 km	MPC · JPL
142744	2002 TL_{293}	—	October 10, 2002	Socorro	LINEAR	·	2.8 km	MPC · JPL
142745	2002 TQ_{293}	—	October 10, 2002	Socorro	LINEAR	·	3.7 km	MPC · JPL
142746	2002 TS_{294}	—	October 12, 2002	Socorro	LINEAR	·	2.7 km	MPC · JPL
142747	2002 TJ_{295}	—	October 13, 2002	Palomar	NEAT	EUN	2.0 km	MPC · JPL
142748	2002 TW_{295}	—	October 13, 2002	Palomar	NEAT	·	4.8 km	MPC · JPL
142749	2002 TS_{296}	—	October 11, 2002	Socorro	LINEAR	·	1.8 km	MPC · JPL
142750	2002 TZ_{297}	—	October 12, 2002	Socorro	LINEAR	·	2.1 km	MPC · JPL
142751	2002 TG_{300}	—	October 15, 2002	Palomar	NEAT	CLA	2.2 km	MPC · JPL
142752 Boroski	2002 TD_{312}	Boroski	October 4, 2002	Apache Point	SDSS	·	2.3 km	MPC · JPL
142753 Briegel	2002 TG_{316}	Briegel	October 4, 2002	Apache Point	SDSS	MAR	1.7 km	MPC · JPL
142754 Brunner	2002 TR_{317}	Brunner	October 5, 2002	Apache Point	SDSS	·	1.8 km	MPC · JPL
142755 Castander	2002 TA_{318}	Castander	October 5, 2002	Apache Point	SDSS	·	1.4 km	MPC · JPL
142756 Chiu	2002 TF_{319}	Chiu	October 5, 2002	Apache Point	SDSS	·	2.3 km	MPC · JPL
142757 Collinge	2002 TS_{335}	Collinge	October 5, 2002	Apache Point	SDSS	·	1.7 km	MPC · JPL
142758 Connolly	2002 TH_{358}	Connolly	October 10, 2002	Apache Point	SDSS	MAS	1.3 km	MPC · JPL
142759 Covey	2002 TQ_{358}	Covey	October 10, 2002	Apache Point	SDSS	MAS	1.3 km	MPC · JPL
142760 Csabai	2002 TN_{361}	Csabai	October 10, 2002	Apache Point	SDSS	·	1.8 km	MPC · JPL
142761	2002 UU_{2}	—	October 28, 2002	Socorro	LINEAR	·	3.5 km	MPC · JPL
142762	2002 UF_{3}	—	October 28, 2002	Palomar	NEAT	·	3.1 km	MPC · JPL
142763	2002 UU_{3}	—	October 29, 2002	Palomar	NEAT	PHO	1.6 km	MPC · JPL
142764	2002 UV_{4}	—	October 29, 2002	Socorro	LINEAR	BAR	1.8 km	MPC · JPL
142765	2002 UX_{4}	—	October 29, 2002	Socorro	LINEAR	GAL	2.7 km	MPC · JPL
142766	2002 UA_{5}	—	October 26, 2002	Haleakala	NEAT	GEF	1.8 km	MPC · JPL
142767	2002 UU_{5}	—	October 28, 2002	Palomar	NEAT	·	1.9 km	MPC · JPL
142768	2002 UA_{6}	—	October 28, 2002	Palomar	NEAT	·	3.9 km	MPC · JPL
142769	2002 UB_{6}	—	October 28, 2002	Palomar	NEAT	·	4.1 km	MPC · JPL
142770	2002 UM_{6}	—	October 28, 2002	Palomar	NEAT	·	3.9 km	MPC · JPL
142771	2002 UQ_{6}	—	October 28, 2002	Palomar	NEAT	·	8.0 km	MPC · JPL
142772	2002 UU_{7}	—	October 28, 2002	Palomar	NEAT	·	2.8 km	MPC · JPL
142773	2002 UZ_{7}	—	October 28, 2002	Palomar	NEAT	·	3.4 km	MPC · JPL
142774	2002 UD_{8}	—	October 28, 2002	Palomar	NEAT	·	2.6 km	MPC · JPL
142775	2002 UP_{8}	—	October 28, 2002	Palomar	NEAT	JUN	1.6 km	MPC · JPL
142776	2002 UQ_{8}	—	October 28, 2002	Palomar	NEAT	·	3.2 km	MPC · JPL
142777	2002 UX_{8}	—	October 28, 2002	Palomar	NEAT	·	4.0 km	MPC · JPL
142778	2002 UJ_{9}	—	October 28, 2002	Palomar	NEAT	·	3.3 km	MPC · JPL
142779	2002 UQ_{9}	—	October 28, 2002	Kitt Peak	Spacewatch	·	2.4 km	MPC · JPL
142780	2002 UN_{10}	—	October 28, 2002	Haleakala	NEAT	·	2.7 km	MPC · JPL
142781	2002 UM_{11}	—	October 30, 2002	Socorro	LINEAR	AMO +1km	1.6 km	MPC · JPL
142782	2002 UK_{12}	—	October 29, 2002	Goodricke-Pigott	Goodricke-Pigott	·	2.1 km	MPC · JPL
142783	2002 UQ_{13}	—	October 28, 2002	Haleakala	NEAT	GEF	2.2 km	MPC · JPL
142784	2002 UZ_{13}	—	October 29, 2002	Socorro	LINEAR	·	7.9 km	MPC · JPL
142785	2002 UG_{14}	—	October 29, 2002	Palomar	NEAT	·	1.8 km	MPC · JPL
142786	2002 UB_{15}	—	October 30, 2002	Socorro	LINEAR	·	2.0 km	MPC · JPL
142787	2002 UD_{15}	—	October 30, 2002	Socorro	LINEAR	·	4.8 km	MPC · JPL
142788	2002 UD_{16}	—	October 30, 2002	Palomar	NEAT	EUN	2.1 km	MPC · JPL
142789	2002 UM_{16}	—	October 30, 2002	Socorro	LINEAR	·	2.1 km	MPC · JPL
142790	2002 UX_{16}	—	October 30, 2002	Haleakala	NEAT	·	3.4 km	MPC · JPL
142791	2002 UQ_{19}	—	October 30, 2002	Haleakala	NEAT	·	3.7 km	MPC · JPL
142792	2002 UR_{19}	—	October 30, 2002	Haleakala	NEAT	·	3.1 km	MPC · JPL
142793	2002 UW_{19}	—	October 30, 2002	Haleakala	NEAT	·	5.2 km	MPC · JPL
142794	2002 UZ_{19}	—	October 28, 2002	Kitt Peak	Spacewatch	NYS	1.9 km	MPC · JPL
142795	2002 UG_{20}	—	October 28, 2002	Palomar	NEAT	·	5.7 km	MPC · JPL
142796	2002 UH_{20}	—	October 28, 2002	Palomar	NEAT	NEM	4.2 km	MPC · JPL
142797	2002 UP_{20}	—	October 28, 2002	Haleakala	NEAT	·	2.3 km	MPC · JPL
142798	2002 UT_{20}	—	October 28, 2002	Haleakala	NEAT	·	2.4 km	MPC · JPL
142799	2002 UA_{23}	—	October 30, 2002	Haleakala	NEAT	·	2.7 km	MPC · JPL
142800	2002 UT_{23}	—	October 28, 2002	Palomar	NEAT	·	2.2 km	MPC · JPL

== 142801–142900 ==
back to top

Designation			Discovery			Properties		Ref
Permanent	Provisional	Named after	Date	Site	Discoverer(s)	Category	Diam.	Ref
142801	2002 US_{26}	—	October 31, 2002	Socorro	LINEAR	·	2.4 km	MPC · JPL
142802	2002 UG_{27}	—	October 31, 2002	Palomar	NEAT	·	2.0 km	MPC · JPL
142803	2002 UM_{27}	—	October 31, 2002	Palomar	NEAT	·	1.9 km	MPC · JPL
142804	2002 UT_{27}	—	October 31, 2002	Palomar	NEAT	·	3.2 km	MPC · JPL
142805	2002 UT_{28}	—	October 31, 2002	Socorro	LINEAR	·	2.6 km	MPC · JPL
142806	2002 UJ_{29}	—	October 31, 2002	Socorro	LINEAR	·	3.8 km	MPC · JPL
142807	2002 UN_{31}	—	October 30, 2002	Haleakala	NEAT	·	2.8 km	MPC · JPL
142808	2002 UQ_{33}	—	October 31, 2002	Anderson Mesa	LONEOS	·	2.0 km	MPC · JPL
142809	2002 US_{34}	—	October 31, 2002	Anderson Mesa	LONEOS	AGN	2.0 km	MPC · JPL
142810	2002 UB_{36}	—	October 31, 2002	Socorro	LINEAR	MAR	2.2 km	MPC · JPL
142811	2002 UX_{36}	—	October 31, 2002	Kvistaberg	Uppsala-DLR Asteroid Survey	·	2.7 km	MPC · JPL
142812	2002 UL_{37}	—	October 31, 2002	Anderson Mesa	LONEOS	·	2.9 km	MPC · JPL
142813	2002 UP_{38}	—	October 31, 2002	Anderson Mesa	LONEOS	(5)	1.8 km	MPC · JPL
142814	2002 UR_{38}	—	October 31, 2002	Palomar	NEAT	MAS	1.1 km	MPC · JPL
142815	2002 US_{39}	—	October 31, 2002	Palomar	NEAT	·	3.2 km	MPC · JPL
142816	2002 UQ_{40}	—	October 31, 2002	Socorro	LINEAR	·	2.6 km	MPC · JPL
142817	2002 UV_{45}	—	October 31, 2002	Socorro	LINEAR	·	2.2 km	MPC · JPL
142818	2002 UT_{46}	—	October 31, 2002	Socorro	LINEAR	·	1.7 km	MPC · JPL
142819	2002 UX_{46}	—	October 31, 2002	Socorro	LINEAR	·	2.6 km	MPC · JPL
142820	2002 UU_{49}	—	October 31, 2002	Socorro	LINEAR	·	3.6 km	MPC · JPL
142821	2002 UB_{50}	—	October 31, 2002	Socorro	LINEAR	·	4.3 km	MPC · JPL
142822 Czarapata	2002 US_{65}	Czarapata	October 30, 2002	Apache Point	SDSS	MAS	1.3 km	MPC · JPL
142823	2002 VY_{3}	—	November 1, 2002	Palomar	NEAT	·	3.6 km	MPC · JPL
142824	2002 VE_{6}	—	November 2, 2002	Haleakala	NEAT	·	3.6 km	MPC · JPL
142825	2002 VV_{6}	—	November 1, 2002	Palomar	NEAT	·	3.2 km	MPC · JPL
142826	2002 VF_{9}	—	November 1, 2002	Palomar	NEAT	·	1.9 km	MPC · JPL
142827	2002 VK_{10}	—	November 1, 2002	Palomar	NEAT	·	4.0 km	MPC · JPL
142828	2002 VW_{10}	—	November 1, 2002	Palomar	NEAT	·	3.3 km	MPC · JPL
142829	2002 VZ_{10}	—	November 1, 2002	Palomar	NEAT	·	1.9 km	MPC · JPL
142830	2002 VG_{11}	—	November 1, 2002	Palomar	NEAT	·	3.0 km	MPC · JPL
142831	2002 VT_{11}	—	November 1, 2002	Palomar	NEAT	V	1.3 km	MPC · JPL
142832	2002 VZ_{11}	—	November 1, 2002	Haleakala	NEAT	WIT	1.9 km	MPC · JPL
142833	2002 VC_{12}	—	November 2, 2002	Kvistaberg	Uppsala-DLR Asteroid Survey	·	2.1 km	MPC · JPL
142834	2002 VD_{12}	—	November 2, 2002	Kvistaberg	Uppsala-DLR Asteroid Survey	·	3.6 km	MPC · JPL
142835	2002 VK_{12}	—	November 4, 2002	Anderson Mesa	LONEOS	MRX	1.8 km	MPC · JPL
142836	2002 VN_{12}	—	November 4, 2002	Anderson Mesa	LONEOS	·	2.9 km	MPC · JPL
142837	2002 VH_{13}	—	November 4, 2002	Palomar	NEAT	·	2.4 km	MPC · JPL
142838	2002 VZ_{15}	—	November 4, 2002	Anderson Mesa	LONEOS	·	3.3 km	MPC · JPL
142839	2002 VQ_{16}	—	November 5, 2002	Socorro	LINEAR	·	2.3 km	MPC · JPL
142840	2002 VV_{16}	—	November 5, 2002	Socorro	LINEAR	·	2.1 km	MPC · JPL
142841	2002 VY_{17}	—	November 2, 2002	Anderson Mesa	LONEOS	·	3.4 km	MPC · JPL
142842	2002 VG_{18}	—	November 2, 2002	Haleakala	NEAT	·	1.6 km	MPC · JPL
142843	2002 VW_{18}	—	November 4, 2002	Anderson Mesa	LONEOS	(5)	1.8 km	MPC · JPL
142844	2002 VQ_{21}	—	November 5, 2002	Socorro	LINEAR	PHO	2.3 km	MPC · JPL
142845	2002 VZ_{21}	—	November 5, 2002	Socorro	LINEAR	·	4.6 km	MPC · JPL
142846	2002 VD_{22}	—	November 5, 2002	Socorro	LINEAR	·	2.3 km	MPC · JPL
142847	2002 VB_{23}	—	November 5, 2002	Socorro	LINEAR	·	2.4 km	MPC · JPL
142848	2002 VD_{23}	—	November 5, 2002	Socorro	LINEAR	·	2.2 km	MPC · JPL
142849	2002 VF_{23}	—	November 5, 2002	Socorro	LINEAR	·	2.6 km	MPC · JPL
142850	2002 VX_{23}	—	November 5, 2002	Socorro	LINEAR	·	1.7 km	MPC · JPL
142851	2002 VE_{24}	—	November 5, 2002	Socorro	LINEAR	·	3.9 km	MPC · JPL
142852	2002 VM_{24}	—	November 5, 2002	Socorro	LINEAR	·	1.8 km	MPC · JPL
142853	2002 VS_{24}	—	November 5, 2002	Socorro	LINEAR	·	3.2 km	MPC · JPL
142854	2002 VA_{25}	—	November 5, 2002	Socorro	LINEAR	·	2.1 km	MPC · JPL
142855	2002 VC_{26}	—	November 5, 2002	Socorro	LINEAR	HOF	4.1 km	MPC · JPL
142856	2002 VS_{26}	—	November 5, 2002	Socorro	LINEAR	(5)	2.3 km	MPC · JPL
142857	2002 VF_{27}	—	November 5, 2002	Socorro	LINEAR	·	3.0 km	MPC · JPL
142858	2002 VV_{27}	—	November 5, 2002	Anderson Mesa	LONEOS	·	3.1 km	MPC · JPL
142859	2002 VB_{28}	—	November 5, 2002	Anderson Mesa	LONEOS	·	3.3 km	MPC · JPL
142860	2002 VJ_{28}	—	November 5, 2002	Anderson Mesa	LONEOS	·	1.9 km	MPC · JPL
142861	2002 VU_{28}	—	November 5, 2002	Anderson Mesa	LONEOS	MAS	1.3 km	MPC · JPL
142862	2002 VW_{28}	—	November 5, 2002	Anderson Mesa	LONEOS	·	2.2 km	MPC · JPL
142863	2002 VC_{29}	—	November 5, 2002	Anderson Mesa	LONEOS	·	2.4 km	MPC · JPL
142864	2002 VR_{29}	—	November 5, 2002	Socorro	LINEAR	·	2.0 km	MPC · JPL
142865	2002 VY_{29}	—	November 5, 2002	Socorro	LINEAR	·	3.0 km	MPC · JPL
142866	2002 VV_{30}	—	November 5, 2002	Socorro	LINEAR	NEM	3.9 km	MPC · JPL
142867	2002 VW_{31}	—	November 5, 2002	Socorro	LINEAR	AGN	2.2 km	MPC · JPL
142868	2002 VB_{32}	—	November 5, 2002	Socorro	LINEAR	(5)	2.3 km	MPC · JPL
142869	2002 VG_{32}	—	November 5, 2002	Socorro	LINEAR	·	2.1 km	MPC · JPL
142870	2002 VQ_{32}	—	November 5, 2002	Socorro	LINEAR	MAS	1.3 km	MPC · JPL
142871	2002 VL_{33}	—	November 5, 2002	Socorro	LINEAR	NEM	3.0 km	MPC · JPL
142872	2002 VZ_{33}	—	November 5, 2002	Socorro	LINEAR	·	3.0 km	MPC · JPL
142873	2002 VJ_{34}	—	November 5, 2002	Socorro	LINEAR	(5)	1.3 km	MPC · JPL
142874	2002 VU_{34}	—	November 5, 2002	Socorro	LINEAR	·	3.5 km	MPC · JPL
142875	2002 VW_{34}	—	November 5, 2002	Socorro	LINEAR	·	3.9 km	MPC · JPL
142876	2002 VO_{35}	—	November 5, 2002	Socorro	LINEAR	MRX	2.0 km	MPC · JPL
142877	2002 VH_{36}	—	November 5, 2002	Socorro	LINEAR	·	3.2 km	MPC · JPL
142878	2002 VQ_{37}	—	November 4, 2002	Haleakala	NEAT	·	4.6 km	MPC · JPL
142879	2002 VX_{38}	—	November 5, 2002	Socorro	LINEAR	V	1.3 km	MPC · JPL
142880	2002 VS_{39}	—	November 5, 2002	Socorro	LINEAR	·	4.1 km	MPC · JPL
142881	2002 VH_{40}	—	November 5, 2002	Socorro	LINEAR	·	2.4 km	MPC · JPL
142882	2002 VB_{41}	—	November 2, 2002	Haleakala	NEAT	EUN	2.6 km	MPC · JPL
142883	2002 VQ_{41}	—	November 5, 2002	Palomar	NEAT	PAD	2.9 km	MPC · JPL
142884	2002 VC_{42}	—	November 5, 2002	Palomar	NEAT	·	1.5 km	MPC · JPL
142885	2002 VT_{42}	—	November 3, 2002	Haleakala	NEAT	·	1.5 km	MPC · JPL
142886	2002 VG_{43}	—	November 4, 2002	Palomar	NEAT	·	4.3 km	MPC · JPL
142887	2002 VH_{43}	—	November 4, 2002	Palomar	NEAT	·	1.9 km	MPC · JPL
142888	2002 VO_{43}	—	November 4, 2002	Palomar	NEAT	·	3.5 km	MPC · JPL
142889	2002 VC_{45}	—	November 5, 2002	Socorro	LINEAR	·	3.4 km	MPC · JPL
142890	2002 VK_{45}	—	November 5, 2002	Socorro	LINEAR	·	3.6 km	MPC · JPL
142891	2002 VT_{45}	—	November 5, 2002	Palomar	NEAT	·	3.2 km	MPC · JPL
142892	2002 VZ_{45}	—	November 5, 2002	Socorro	LINEAR	·	1.5 km	MPC · JPL
142893	2002 VA_{46}	—	November 5, 2002	Socorro	LINEAR	·	2.0 km	MPC · JPL
142894	2002 VN_{46}	—	November 5, 2002	Palomar	NEAT	·	2.3 km	MPC · JPL
142895	2002 VQ_{46}	—	November 5, 2002	Palomar	NEAT	(5)	3.9 km	MPC · JPL
142896	2002 VG_{47}	—	November 5, 2002	Anderson Mesa	LONEOS	HNS	1.8 km	MPC · JPL
142897	2002 VT_{47}	—	November 5, 2002	Socorro	LINEAR	·	3.1 km	MPC · JPL
142898	2002 VV_{47}	—	November 5, 2002	Socorro	LINEAR	EUN	3.1 km	MPC · JPL
142899	2002 VA_{48}	—	November 5, 2002	Socorro	LINEAR	·	2.8 km	MPC · JPL
142900	2002 VR_{48}	—	November 5, 2002	Socorro	LINEAR	·	4.7 km	MPC · JPL

== 142901–143000 ==
back to top

Designation			Discovery			Properties		Ref
Permanent	Provisional	Named after	Date	Site	Discoverer(s)	Category	Diam.	Ref
142901	2002 VG_{49}	—	November 5, 2002	Anderson Mesa	LONEOS	AGN	2.2 km	MPC · JPL
142902	2002 VK_{49}	—	November 5, 2002	Anderson Mesa	LONEOS	·	3.9 km	MPC · JPL
142903	2002 VY_{49}	—	November 5, 2002	Anderson Mesa	LONEOS	·	1.5 km	MPC · JPL
142904	2002 VD_{50}	—	November 5, 2002	Anderson Mesa	LONEOS	(5)	2.6 km	MPC · JPL
142905	2002 VJ_{50}	—	November 5, 2002	Anderson Mesa	LONEOS	NYS	2.1 km	MPC · JPL
142906	2002 VE_{51}	—	November 6, 2002	Anderson Mesa	LONEOS	·	2.0 km	MPC · JPL
142907	2002 VA_{52}	—	November 6, 2002	Anderson Mesa	LONEOS	·	5.0 km	MPC · JPL
142908	2002 VC_{52}	—	November 6, 2002	Anderson Mesa	LONEOS	·	2.9 km	MPC · JPL
142909	2002 VL_{52}	—	November 6, 2002	Anderson Mesa	LONEOS	·	2.2 km	MPC · JPL
142910	2002 VC_{53}	—	November 6, 2002	Socorro	LINEAR	(12739)	3.2 km	MPC · JPL
142911	2002 VJ_{53}	—	November 6, 2002	Socorro	LINEAR	·	2.8 km	MPC · JPL
142912	2002 VL_{54}	—	November 6, 2002	Anderson Mesa	LONEOS	JUN	1.7 km	MPC · JPL
142913	2002 VN_{55}	—	November 6, 2002	Socorro	LINEAR	·	1.8 km	MPC · JPL
142914	2002 VW_{55}	—	November 6, 2002	Socorro	LINEAR	·	6.6 km	MPC · JPL
142915	2002 VD_{56}	—	November 6, 2002	Anderson Mesa	LONEOS	·	4.4 km	MPC · JPL
142916	2002 VH_{56}	—	November 6, 2002	Anderson Mesa	LONEOS	·	2.2 km	MPC · JPL
142917	2002 VP_{56}	—	November 6, 2002	Anderson Mesa	LONEOS	·	3.9 km	MPC · JPL
142918	2002 VT_{56}	—	November 6, 2002	Socorro	LINEAR	(5)	2.3 km	MPC · JPL
142919	2002 VA_{57}	—	November 6, 2002	Kitt Peak	Spacewatch	·	2.7 km	MPC · JPL
142920	2002 VG_{57}	—	November 6, 2002	Haleakala	NEAT	·	3.1 km	MPC · JPL
142921	2002 VQ_{57}	—	November 6, 2002	Haleakala	NEAT	·	1.5 km	MPC · JPL
142922	2002 VC_{58}	—	November 6, 2002	Haleakala	NEAT	·	3.4 km	MPC · JPL
142923	2002 VF_{58}	—	November 6, 2002	Haleakala	NEAT	·	3.8 km	MPC · JPL
142924	2002 VR_{58}	—	November 6, 2002	Haleakala	NEAT	·	2.2 km	MPC · JPL
142925	2002 VU_{58}	—	November 6, 2002	Haleakala	NEAT	(5)	2.6 km	MPC · JPL
142926	2002 VD_{60}	—	November 3, 2002	Haleakala	NEAT	·	2.4 km	MPC · JPL
142927	2002 VF_{60}	—	November 3, 2002	Haleakala	NEAT	·	1.3 km	MPC · JPL
142928	2002 VK_{60}	—	November 3, 2002	Haleakala	NEAT	·	2.6 km	MPC · JPL
142929	2002 VS_{61}	—	November 5, 2002	Socorro	LINEAR	·	2.4 km	MPC · JPL
142930	2002 VR_{63}	—	November 6, 2002	Anderson Mesa	LONEOS	·	3.2 km	MPC · JPL
142931	2002 VT_{63}	—	November 6, 2002	Anderson Mesa	LONEOS	·	3.2 km	MPC · JPL
142932	2002 VH_{64}	—	November 6, 2002	Socorro	LINEAR	·	1.4 km	MPC · JPL
142933	2002 VR_{65}	—	November 7, 2002	Socorro	LINEAR	·	2.4 km	MPC · JPL
142934	2002 VX_{65}	—	November 7, 2002	Socorro	LINEAR	·	2.8 km	MPC · JPL
142935	2002 VX_{66}	—	November 6, 2002	Socorro	LINEAR	·	1.5 km	MPC · JPL
142936	2002 VZ_{66}	—	November 6, 2002	Socorro	LINEAR	·	1.6 km	MPC · JPL
142937	2002 VC_{68}	—	November 7, 2002	Kitt Peak	Spacewatch	·	2.2 km	MPC · JPL
142938	2002 VN_{68}	—	November 7, 2002	Socorro	LINEAR	·	2.3 km	MPC · JPL
142939	2002 VP_{68}	—	November 7, 2002	Socorro	LINEAR	EUN	2.1 km	MPC · JPL
142940	2002 VX_{68}	—	November 7, 2002	Anderson Mesa	LONEOS	·	5.4 km	MPC · JPL
142941	2002 VC_{69}	—	November 8, 2002	Socorro	LINEAR	·	1.9 km	MPC · JPL
142942	2002 VG_{69}	—	November 8, 2002	Socorro	LINEAR	·	2.3 km	MPC · JPL
142943	2002 VK_{69}	—	November 8, 2002	Socorro	LINEAR	·	3.1 km	MPC · JPL
142944	2002 VT_{69}	—	November 7, 2002	Socorro	LINEAR	·	2.8 km	MPC · JPL
142945	2002 VB_{70}	—	November 7, 2002	Socorro	LINEAR	·	1.4 km	MPC · JPL
142946	2002 VD_{70}	—	November 7, 2002	Socorro	LINEAR	·	2.2 km	MPC · JPL
142947	2002 VK_{72}	—	November 7, 2002	Socorro	LINEAR	·	2.8 km	MPC · JPL
142948	2002 VQ_{72}	—	November 7, 2002	Socorro	LINEAR	·	1.7 km	MPC · JPL
142949	2002 VB_{73}	—	November 7, 2002	Socorro	LINEAR	·	2.4 km	MPC · JPL
142950	2002 VS_{73}	—	November 7, 2002	Socorro	LINEAR	·	3.5 km	MPC · JPL
142951	2002 VU_{73}	—	November 7, 2002	Socorro	LINEAR	·	2.5 km	MPC · JPL
142952	2002 VF_{75}	—	November 7, 2002	Socorro	LINEAR	(5)	1.7 km	MPC · JPL
142953	2002 VQ_{75}	—	November 7, 2002	Socorro	LINEAR	·	3.8 km	MPC · JPL
142954	2002 VD_{77}	—	November 7, 2002	Socorro	LINEAR	·	1.5 km	MPC · JPL
142955	2002 VQ_{77}	—	November 7, 2002	Socorro	LINEAR	·	1.9 km	MPC · JPL
142956	2002 VT_{77}	—	November 7, 2002	Socorro	LINEAR	·	2.5 km	MPC · JPL
142957	2002 VX_{77}	—	November 7, 2002	Socorro	LINEAR	(5)	1.6 km	MPC · JPL
142958	2002 VA_{78}	—	November 7, 2002	Socorro	LINEAR	·	3.0 km	MPC · JPL
142959	2002 VP_{78}	—	November 7, 2002	Socorro	LINEAR	·	3.0 km	MPC · JPL
142960	2002 VJ_{79}	—	November 7, 2002	Socorro	LINEAR	·	3.9 km	MPC · JPL
142961	2002 VQ_{79}	—	November 7, 2002	Socorro	LINEAR	·	4.2 km	MPC · JPL
142962	2002 VY_{79}	—	November 7, 2002	Socorro	LINEAR	·	4.0 km	MPC · JPL
142963	2002 VH_{80}	—	November 7, 2002	Socorro	LINEAR	·	2.0 km	MPC · JPL
142964	2002 VO_{80}	—	November 7, 2002	Socorro	LINEAR	·	3.4 km	MPC · JPL
142965	2002 VA_{81}	—	November 7, 2002	Socorro	LINEAR	·	4.3 km	MPC · JPL
142966	2002 VE_{81}	—	November 7, 2002	Socorro	LINEAR	·	2.4 km	MPC · JPL
142967	2002 VT_{81}	—	November 7, 2002	Socorro	LINEAR	·	1.8 km	MPC · JPL
142968	2002 VX_{81}	—	November 7, 2002	Socorro	LINEAR	·	1.8 km	MPC · JPL
142969	2002 VF_{82}	—	November 7, 2002	Socorro	LINEAR	(5)	1.9 km	MPC · JPL
142970	2002 VG_{82}	—	November 7, 2002	Socorro	LINEAR	·	3.4 km	MPC · JPL
142971	2002 VQ_{82}	—	November 7, 2002	Socorro	LINEAR	·	4.2 km	MPC · JPL
142972	2002 VY_{82}	—	November 7, 2002	Socorro	LINEAR	(5)	2.2 km	MPC · JPL
142973	2002 VK_{83}	—	November 7, 2002	Socorro	LINEAR	·	2.4 km	MPC · JPL
142974	2002 VO_{83}	—	November 7, 2002	Socorro	LINEAR	V	1.1 km	MPC · JPL
142975	2002 VM_{84}	—	November 7, 2002	Socorro	LINEAR	·	4.8 km	MPC · JPL
142976	2002 VN_{84}	—	November 7, 2002	Socorro	LINEAR	·	4.4 km	MPC · JPL
142977	2002 VT_{84}	—	November 7, 2002	Socorro	LINEAR	(5)	2.3 km	MPC · JPL
142978	2002 VU_{84}	—	November 7, 2002	Socorro	LINEAR	·	2.3 km	MPC · JPL
142979	2002 VX_{84}	—	November 7, 2002	Socorro	LINEAR	·	5.4 km	MPC · JPL
142980	2002 VZ_{84}	—	November 8, 2002	Socorro	LINEAR	V	1.1 km	MPC · JPL
142981	2002 VK_{85}	—	November 8, 2002	Socorro	LINEAR	·	5.8 km	MPC · JPL
142982	2002 VD_{87}	—	November 8, 2002	Socorro	LINEAR	PAD	4.5 km	MPC · JPL
142983	2002 VO_{87}	—	November 8, 2002	Socorro	LINEAR	MAR	1.4 km	MPC · JPL
142984	2002 VA_{88}	—	November 8, 2002	Socorro	LINEAR	·	1.4 km	MPC · JPL
142985	2002 VF_{88}	—	November 10, 2002	Socorro	LINEAR	·	2.3 km	MPC · JPL
142986	2002 VP_{89}	—	November 11, 2002	Socorro	LINEAR	·	5.6 km	MPC · JPL
142987	2002 VZ_{89}	—	November 11, 2002	Socorro	LINEAR	·	3.0 km	MPC · JPL
142988	2002 VD_{90}	—	November 11, 2002	Socorro	LINEAR	KOR	2.3 km	MPC · JPL
142989	2002 VK_{90}	—	November 11, 2002	Anderson Mesa	LONEOS	·	2.3 km	MPC · JPL
142990	2002 VZ_{92}	—	November 11, 2002	Socorro	LINEAR	(5)	3.2 km	MPC · JPL
142991	2002 VG_{93}	—	November 11, 2002	Socorro	LINEAR	(5)	2.0 km	MPC · JPL
142992	2002 VZ_{93}	—	November 12, 2002	Socorro	LINEAR	·	2.0 km	MPC · JPL
142993	2002 VA_{94}	—	November 12, 2002	Socorro	LINEAR	·	4.4 km	MPC · JPL
142994	2002 VB_{94}	—	November 12, 2002	Socorro	LINEAR	(5)	2.9 km	MPC · JPL
142995	2002 VL_{94}	—	November 12, 2002	Socorro	LINEAR	(5)	2.1 km	MPC · JPL
142996	2002 VZ_{95}	—	November 11, 2002	Anderson Mesa	LONEOS	·	3.3 km	MPC · JPL
142997	2002 VR_{96}	—	November 11, 2002	Socorro	LINEAR	·	2.8 km	MPC · JPL
142998	2002 VP_{97}	—	November 12, 2002	Socorro	LINEAR	·	2.9 km	MPC · JPL
142999	2002 VZ_{98}	—	November 13, 2002	Socorro	LINEAR	·	8.2 km	MPC · JPL
143000	2002 VL_{101}	—	November 11, 2002	Socorro	LINEAR	·	2.4 km	MPC · JPL

back to top

== See also ==
- Meanings of minor-planet names: 142001–143000
