= Meanings of minor-planet names: 142001–143000 =

As minor planet discoveries are confirmed, they are given a permanent number by the IAU's Minor Planet Center (MPC), and the discoverers can then submit names for them, following the IAU's naming conventions. The list below concerns those minor planets in the specified number-range that have received names, and explains the meanings of those names.

Official naming citations of newly named small Solar System bodies are approved and published in a bulletin by IAU's Working Group for Small Bodies Nomenclature (WGSBN). Before May 2021, citations were published in MPC's Minor Planet Circulars for many decades. Recent citations can also be found on the JPL Small-Body Database (SBDB). Until his death in 2016, German astronomer Lutz D. Schmadel compiled these citations into the Dictionary of Minor Planet Names (DMP) and regularly updated the collection.

Based on Paul Herget's The Names of the Minor Planets, Schmadel also researched the unclear origin of numerous asteroids, most of which had been named prior to World War II. This article incorporates text from this source, which is in the public domain: SBDB New namings may only be added to this list below after official publication as the preannouncement of names is condemned. The WGSBN publishes a comprehensive guideline for the naming rules of non-cometary small Solar System bodies.

== 142001–142100 ==
Named minor planet	Provisional	This minor planet was named for...	Ref · Catalog
142014 Neirinck	2002 PA_{168}	Pierre Neirinck (1926–), French-British head of the Satellite Orbits Group at Appleton Laboratory in the UK during the 1970s	JPL · 142014
142020 Xinghaishiyan	2002 PH_{178}	Xinghaishiyan, motto of The Suzhou Industry Park Xinghai Experimental Senior School, meaning "All stars shine brilliantly; All rivers flow to the Sea" and an educational philosophy "to make everyone a star". Xing means "star", hai means "sea", and shiyan means "experimental"	JPL · 142020
142084 Jamesdaniel	2002 QU_{47}	James Sealy (1951–1978) and Daniel Sealy (born 1957), sons of Robert and Hazel Sealy, friends of American astronomer James Whitney Young who discovered this minor planet (also see 147397 Bobhazel)	JPL · 142084
142091 Omerblaes	2002 QW_{52}	Omer Michael Blaes (born 1961), an astrophysicist at the University of California Santa Barbara.	JPL · 142091

== 142101–142200 ==
back to top

Named minor planet	Provisional	This minor planet was named for...	Ref · Catalog
142106 Nengshun	2002 QZ_{83}	Ye Nengshun (1894–1952), a great-grandfather of Chinese astronomer Ye Quan-Zhi, who discovered this minor planet	JPL · 142106

== 142201–142300 ==
back to top

Named minor planet	Provisional	This minor planet was named for...	Ref · Catalog
142275 Simonyi	2002 RQ_{117}	Károly Simonyi (1916–2001), a professor of electrical engineering at the Technical University of Budapest.	JPL · 142275
142291 Dompfaff	2002 RE_{138}	"Dompfaff" is the common name for a cardinal (priest) in the German catholic liturgy. It is also the name of the endangered Eurasian bullfinch, a beautiful small bird with a red breast. It appears regularly in the Eifel (Ardennes) near the Hoher List Observatory during winter.	JPL · 142291

== 142301–142400 ==
back to top

Named minor planet	Provisional	This minor planet was named for...	Ref · Catalog
142368 Majden	2002 RH_{233}	Edward Majden (born 1939), Canadian amateur astronomer, recorder of meteor spectra, associate member of the Meteorites and Impacts Advisory Committee, and winner of the 2006 Chant Medal by the Royal Astronomical Society of Canada †	JPL · 142368
142369 Johnhodges	2002 RE_{234}	John V. Hodges (1918–1983), active member and later observatory director of the Regina Astronomical Society	JPL · 142369

== 142401–142500 ==
back to top

Named minor planet	Provisional	This minor planet was named for...	Ref · Catalog
142401 Simonhook	2002 SH_{23}	Simon Hook (b. 1961), Principal Investigator of the ECOSTRESS instrument on the International Space Station and was manager of the Science Division at JPL from 2015–2022.	IAU · 142401
142408 Trebur	2002 SU_{27}	The German municipality of Trebur, home of the Michael Adrian Observatory (239), where this minor planet was discovered	JPL · 142408

== 142501–142600 ==
back to top

Named minor planet	Provisional	This minor planet was named for...	Ref · Catalog
142558 Rosarno	2002 TP_{61}	Rosarno, small town in the Italian region of Calabria.	IAU · 142558
142562 Graetz	2002 TL_{69}	Paul Graetz (1889–1937), German Army officer, the first person to cross southern Africa by automobile (1907–1909)	JPL · 142562

== 142601–142700 ==
back to top

Named minor planet	Provisional	This minor planet was named for...	Ref · Catalog
There are no named minor planets in this number range

== 142701–142800 ==
back to top

Named minor planet	Provisional	This minor planet was named for...	Ref · Catalog
142752 Boroski	2002 TD_{312}	William Boroski (born 1960), American astronomer and contributor to the Sloan Digital Sky Survey	JPL · 142752
142753 Briegel	2002 TG_{316}	Charlie Briegel (born 1949), American computer scientist with the Sloan Digital Sky Survey	JPL · 142753
142754 Brunner	2002 TR_{317}	Robert Brunner (born 1968), American astrophysicist with the Sloan Digital Sky Survey	JPL · 142754
142755 Castander	2002 TA_{318}	Francisco J. Castander (born 1968), Spanish astronomer with the Sloan Digital Sky Survey	JPL · 142755
142756 Chiu	2002 TF_{319}	Kuenley Chiu (born 1975), American astronomer with the Sloan Digital Sky Survey	JPL · 142756
142757 Collinge	2002 TS_{335}	Matthew Collinge (born 1979), American astronomer with the Sloan Digital Sky Survey	JPL · 142757
142758 Connolly	2002 TH_{358}	Andy Connolly (born 1966), American astronomer with the Sloan Digital Sky Survey	JPL · 142758
142759 Covey	2002 TQ_{358}	Kevin Covey (born 1977), American astronomer at Lowell Observatory and contributor to the Sloan Digital Sky Survey	JPL · 142759
142760 Csabai	2002 TN_{361}	István Csabai (born 1965), Hungarian physicist with the Sloan Digital Sky Survey	JPL · 142760

== 142801–142900 ==
back to top

Named minor planet	Provisional	This minor planet was named for...	Ref · Catalog
142822 Czarapata	2002 US_{65}	Paul Czarapata (born 1947), American astronomer with the Sloan Digital Sky Survey	JPL · 142822

== 142901–143000 ==
back to top

Named minor planet	Provisional	This minor planet was named for...	Ref · Catalog
There are no named minor planets in this number range

back to top

Preceded by 141,001–142,000	Meanings of minor-planet names List of minor planets: 142,001–143,000	Succeeded by 143,001–144,000
