= List of minor planets: 479001–480000 =

The following is a partial list of minor planets, running from minor-planet number 479001 through 480000, inclusive. The primary data for this and other partial lists is based on JPL's "Small-Body Orbital Elements" and data available from the Minor Planet Center. Critical list information is also provided by the MPC, unless otherwise specified from Lowell Observatory. A detailed description of the table's columns and additional sources are given on the main page including a complete list of every page in this series, and a statistical break-up on the dynamical classification of minor planets.

Also see the summary list of all named bodies in numerical and alphabetical order, and the corresponding naming citations for the number range of this particular list. New namings may only be added to this list after official publication, as the preannouncement of names is condemned by the Working Group for Small Bodies Nomenclature of the International Astronomical Union.

| Near-Earth obj. | MBA (inner) | MBA (outer) | Centaur |
| Mars-crosser | MBA (middle) | Jupiter trojan | Trans-Neptunian obj. |
| Unclassified |

== 479001–479100 ==
| Designation | | | Discovery | | | Properties | | Ref |
| Permanent | Provisional | Named after | Date | Site | Discoverer(s) | Category | Diam. | Ref |
|---|---|---|---|---|---|---|---|---|
| 479001 | 2012 XX_{137} | — | September 25, 2012 | Mount Lemmon | Mount Lemmon Survey | · | 1.1 km | MPC · JPL |
| 479002 | 2012 XF_{140} | — | February 26, 2010 | WISE | WISE | · | 2.2 km | MPC · JPL |
| 479003 | 2012 XT_{141} | — | October 19, 2003 | Kitt Peak | Spacewatch | · | 1.3 km | MPC · JPL |
| 479004 | 2012 XX_{143} | — | January 16, 2009 | Mount Lemmon | Mount Lemmon Survey | · | 900 m | MPC · JPL |
| 479005 | 2012 XF_{144} | — | October 17, 2006 | Kitt Peak | Spacewatch | · | 3.3 km | MPC · JPL |
| 479006 | 2012 XH_{146} | — | May 9, 2011 | Mount Lemmon | Mount Lemmon Survey | · | 1.4 km | MPC · JPL |
| 479007 | 2012 XN_{146} | — | November 8, 2008 | Mount Lemmon | Mount Lemmon Survey | · | 940 m | MPC · JPL |
| 479008 | 2012 XZ_{146} | — | January 1, 2009 | Mount Lemmon | Mount Lemmon Survey | · | 1.3 km | MPC · JPL |
| 479009 | 2012 XG_{147} | — | April 14, 2010 | WISE | WISE | · | 2.1 km | MPC · JPL |
| 479010 | 2012 XO_{147} | — | December 3, 2012 | Mount Lemmon | Mount Lemmon Survey | · | 1.9 km | MPC · JPL |
| 479011 | 2012 XG_{149} | — | February 18, 2010 | WISE | WISE | · | 3.1 km | MPC · JPL |
| 479012 | 2012 XK_{151} | — | November 13, 2012 | Mount Lemmon | Mount Lemmon Survey | · | 2.9 km | MPC · JPL |
| 479013 | 2012 XD_{152} | — | December 22, 2003 | Socorro | LINEAR | · | 2.1 km | MPC · JPL |
| 479014 | 2012 XJ_{152} | — | December 19, 2001 | Socorro | LINEAR | · | 3.3 km | MPC · JPL |
| 479015 | 2012 XC_{154} | — | November 25, 2006 | Kitt Peak | Spacewatch | TIR | 2.8 km | MPC · JPL |
| 479016 | 2012 XF_{156} | — | January 6, 2005 | Catalina | CSS | · | 1.3 km | MPC · JPL |
| 479017 | 2012 YG_{1} | — | December 12, 2012 | Mount Lemmon | Mount Lemmon Survey | · | 3.0 km | MPC · JPL |
| 479018 | 2012 YW_{1} | — | November 12, 2012 | Mount Lemmon | Mount Lemmon Survey | · | 2.9 km | MPC · JPL |
| 479019 | 2012 YL_{3} | — | August 14, 2007 | Siding Spring | SSS | · | 1.8 km | MPC · JPL |
| 479020 | 2012 YH_{8} | — | December 11, 2012 | Catalina | CSS | · | 2.5 km | MPC · JPL |
| 479021 | 2013 AC_{2} | — | March 15, 2004 | Kitt Peak | Spacewatch | · | 1.5 km | MPC · JPL |
| 479022 | 2013 AY_{11} | — | December 6, 2012 | Mount Lemmon | Mount Lemmon Survey | · | 2.0 km | MPC · JPL |
| 479023 | 2013 AZ_{11} | — | November 3, 1999 | Socorro | LINEAR | · | 1.4 km | MPC · JPL |
| 479024 | 2013 AL_{12} | — | May 18, 2010 | WISE | WISE | · | 4.4 km | MPC · JPL |
| 479025 | 2013 AP_{12} | — | January 3, 2013 | Mount Lemmon | Mount Lemmon Survey | · | 2.7 km | MPC · JPL |
| 479026 | 2013 AP_{13} | — | June 20, 2010 | WISE | WISE | CYB | 4.2 km | MPC · JPL |
| 479027 | 2013 AQ_{17} | — | November 14, 2012 | Mount Lemmon | Mount Lemmon Survey | (1547) | 1.5 km | MPC · JPL |
| 479028 | 2013 AC_{19} | — | March 2, 2008 | Mount Lemmon | Mount Lemmon Survey | · | 3.0 km | MPC · JPL |
| 479029 | 2013 AZ_{19} | — | November 12, 2012 | Mount Lemmon | Mount Lemmon Survey | · | 2.1 km | MPC · JPL |
| 479030 | 2013 AD_{20} | — | October 31, 1999 | Socorro | LINEAR | · | 1.8 km | MPC · JPL |
| 479031 | 2013 AK_{22} | — | January 13, 2002 | Kitt Peak | Spacewatch | · | 2.9 km | MPC · JPL |
| 479032 | 2013 AX_{22} | — | January 5, 2013 | Mount Lemmon | Mount Lemmon Survey | · | 2.3 km | MPC · JPL |
| 479033 | 2013 AC_{23} | — | December 10, 2012 | Mount Lemmon | Mount Lemmon Survey | · | 1.7 km | MPC · JPL |
| 479034 | 2013 AL_{25} | — | December 11, 2012 | Mount Lemmon | Mount Lemmon Survey | · | 2.4 km | MPC · JPL |
| 479035 | 2013 AK_{28} | — | December 19, 2007 | Kitt Peak | Spacewatch | · | 1.8 km | MPC · JPL |
| 479036 | 2013 AC_{30} | — | September 22, 2003 | Kitt Peak | Spacewatch | · | 1.3 km | MPC · JPL |
| 479037 | 2013 AY_{32} | — | May 16, 2010 | WISE | WISE | · | 4.2 km | MPC · JPL |
| 479038 | 2013 AC_{33} | — | December 17, 2007 | Kitt Peak | Spacewatch | · | 2.4 km | MPC · JPL |
| 479039 | 2013 AL_{33} | — | January 31, 2009 | Mount Lemmon | Mount Lemmon Survey | · | 1.6 km | MPC · JPL |
| 479040 | 2013 AX_{35} | — | December 12, 2012 | Kitt Peak | Spacewatch | · | 3.6 km | MPC · JPL |
| 479041 | 2013 AJ_{37} | — | January 10, 2008 | Kitt Peak | Spacewatch | · | 1.7 km | MPC · JPL |
| 479042 | 2013 AS_{37} | — | July 6, 2005 | Kitt Peak | Spacewatch | EOS | 1.9 km | MPC · JPL |
| 479043 | 2013 AR_{39} | — | November 15, 2006 | Mount Lemmon | Mount Lemmon Survey | · | 1.4 km | MPC · JPL |
| 479044 | 2013 AJ_{40} | — | September 12, 2010 | Mount Lemmon | Mount Lemmon Survey | · | 3.3 km | MPC · JPL |
| 479045 | 2013 AR_{41} | — | March 6, 2008 | Mount Lemmon | Mount Lemmon Survey | VER | 2.1 km | MPC · JPL |
| 479046 | 2013 AN_{44} | — | December 16, 2007 | Mount Lemmon | Mount Lemmon Survey | · | 2.0 km | MPC · JPL |
| 479047 | 2013 AJ_{45} | — | January 11, 2008 | Kitt Peak | Spacewatch | · | 2.5 km | MPC · JPL |
| 479048 | 2013 AF_{46} | — | February 2, 2008 | Kitt Peak | Spacewatch | EMA | 2.9 km | MPC · JPL |
| 479049 | 2013 AX_{47} | — | March 18, 2009 | Mount Lemmon | Mount Lemmon Survey | · | 1.8 km | MPC · JPL |
| 479050 | 2013 AF_{48} | — | December 29, 2008 | Mount Lemmon | Mount Lemmon Survey | · | 1.9 km | MPC · JPL |
| 479051 | 2013 AD_{50} | — | March 19, 2009 | Mount Lemmon | Mount Lemmon Survey | EOS | 2.3 km | MPC · JPL |
| 479052 | 2013 AU_{52} | — | February 11, 2004 | Anderson Mesa | LONEOS | · | 1.8 km | MPC · JPL |
| 479053 | 2013 AJ_{53} | — | November 12, 2012 | Mount Lemmon | Mount Lemmon Survey | · | 4.6 km | MPC · JPL |
| 479054 | 2013 AB_{56} | — | March 9, 2008 | Catalina | CSS | · | 3.2 km | MPC · JPL |
| 479055 | 2013 AG_{56} | — | February 8, 2008 | Kitt Peak | Spacewatch | · | 2.4 km | MPC · JPL |
| 479056 | 2013 AO_{56} | — | December 16, 2007 | Mount Lemmon | Mount Lemmon Survey | TRE | 2.3 km | MPC · JPL |
| 479057 | 2013 AS_{56} | — | October 3, 2002 | Socorro | LINEAR | · | 2.1 km | MPC · JPL |
| 479058 | 2013 AR_{57} | — | February 7, 2008 | Mount Lemmon | Mount Lemmon Survey | EOS | 1.8 km | MPC · JPL |
| 479059 | 2013 AR_{64} | — | January 14, 2008 | Kitt Peak | Spacewatch | · | 2.4 km | MPC · JPL |
| 479060 | 2013 AX_{68} | — | January 21, 2002 | Kitt Peak | Spacewatch | · | 4.3 km | MPC · JPL |
| 479061 | 2013 AA_{69} | — | January 15, 2004 | Kitt Peak | Spacewatch | AEO | 850 m | MPC · JPL |
| 479062 | 2013 AU_{75} | — | September 13, 2007 | Catalina | CSS | · | 1.4 km | MPC · JPL |
| 479063 | 2013 AK_{78} | — | January 18, 2008 | Kitt Peak | Spacewatch | TEL | 1.2 km | MPC · JPL |
| 479064 | 2013 AQ_{78} | — | October 16, 2007 | Catalina | CSS | · | 1.8 km | MPC · JPL |
| 479065 | 2013 AY_{78} | — | September 14, 2007 | Catalina | CSS | · | 1.9 km | MPC · JPL |
| 479066 | 2013 AP_{81} | — | January 10, 2008 | Kitt Peak | Spacewatch | · | 1.4 km | MPC · JPL |
| 479067 | 2013 AV_{82} | — | October 3, 2003 | Kitt Peak | Spacewatch | · | 1.3 km | MPC · JPL |
| 479068 | 2013 AB_{83} | — | December 6, 2007 | Kitt Peak | Spacewatch | · | 2.3 km | MPC · JPL |
| 479069 | 2013 AJ_{83} | — | October 3, 2006 | Mount Lemmon | Mount Lemmon Survey | TEL | 1.4 km | MPC · JPL |
| 479070 | 2013 AY_{84} | — | September 19, 2006 | Kitt Peak | Spacewatch | KOR | 1.1 km | MPC · JPL |
| 479071 | 2013 AK_{85} | — | December 4, 2007 | Kitt Peak | Spacewatch | · | 1.4 km | MPC · JPL |
| 479072 | 2013 AC_{87} | — | June 1, 2009 | Mount Lemmon | Mount Lemmon Survey | · | 4.6 km | MPC · JPL |
| 479073 | 2013 AX_{87} | — | November 13, 2012 | Mount Lemmon | Mount Lemmon Survey | · | 3.1 km | MPC · JPL |
| 479074 | 2013 AK_{90} | — | August 8, 1996 | La Silla | E. W. Elst | · | 4.4 km | MPC · JPL |
| 479075 | 2013 AA_{91} | — | March 2, 2009 | Mount Lemmon | Mount Lemmon Survey | · | 1.7 km | MPC · JPL |
| 479076 | 2013 AT_{92} | — | October 14, 2007 | Catalina | CSS | · | 1.9 km | MPC · JPL |
| 479077 | 2013 AE_{93} | — | November 2, 2007 | Kitt Peak | Spacewatch | MRX | 970 m | MPC · JPL |
| 479078 | 2013 AR_{93} | — | January 9, 2013 | Catalina | CSS | · | 3.8 km | MPC · JPL |
| 479079 | 2013 AE_{95} | — | December 13, 1999 | Kitt Peak | Spacewatch | · | 1.1 km | MPC · JPL |
| 479080 | 2013 AK_{96} | — | November 9, 2007 | Kitt Peak | Spacewatch | · | 1.9 km | MPC · JPL |
| 479081 | 2013 AE_{99} | — | April 10, 2010 | WISE | WISE | · | 2.2 km | MPC · JPL |
| 479082 | 2013 AQ_{99} | — | September 13, 2007 | Kitt Peak | Spacewatch | · | 1.7 km | MPC · JPL |
| 479083 | 2013 AU_{100} | — | September 20, 2011 | Kitt Peak | Spacewatch | · | 2.7 km | MPC · JPL |
| 479084 | 2013 AL_{101} | — | November 20, 2007 | Mount Lemmon | Mount Lemmon Survey | · | 1.5 km | MPC · JPL |
| 479085 | 2013 AF_{104} | — | September 22, 2006 | Catalina | CSS | · | 2.8 km | MPC · JPL |
| 479086 | 2013 AQ_{105} | — | March 17, 2004 | Kitt Peak | Spacewatch | · | 1.8 km | MPC · JPL |
| 479087 | 2013 AS_{108} | — | October 22, 2006 | Mount Lemmon | Mount Lemmon Survey | · | 3.4 km | MPC · JPL |
| 479088 | 2013 AO_{110} | — | January 19, 2008 | Mount Lemmon | Mount Lemmon Survey | (43176) | 3.5 km | MPC · JPL |
| 479089 | 2013 AM_{116} | — | March 7, 2008 | Kitt Peak | Spacewatch | · | 2.7 km | MPC · JPL |
| 479090 | 2013 AU_{116} | — | January 5, 2013 | Kitt Peak | Spacewatch | · | 3.2 km | MPC · JPL |
| 479091 | 2013 AF_{117} | — | January 10, 2008 | Mount Lemmon | Mount Lemmon Survey | · | 1.6 km | MPC · JPL |
| 479092 | 2013 AF_{118} | — | September 12, 2007 | Mount Lemmon | Mount Lemmon Survey | · | 1.7 km | MPC · JPL |
| 479093 | 2013 AV_{119} | — | November 7, 2007 | Kitt Peak | Spacewatch | · | 1.7 km | MPC · JPL |
| 479094 | 2013 AY_{119} | — | December 30, 2007 | Kitt Peak | Spacewatch | EOS | 1.8 km | MPC · JPL |
| 479095 | 2013 AM_{120} | — | September 28, 2011 | Kitt Peak | Spacewatch | · | 1.5 km | MPC · JPL |
| 479096 | 2013 AC_{121} | — | November 7, 2007 | Kitt Peak | Spacewatch | · | 3.2 km | MPC · JPL |
| 479097 | 2013 AU_{123} | — | February 6, 2002 | Kitt Peak | Spacewatch | · | 3.1 km | MPC · JPL |
| 479098 | 2013 AU_{128} | — | January 20, 2008 | Kitt Peak | Spacewatch | · | 2.7 km | MPC · JPL |
| 479099 | 2013 AT_{130} | — | November 2, 2007 | Mount Lemmon | Mount Lemmon Survey | AGN | 1.1 km | MPC · JPL |
| 479100 | 2013 AR_{135} | — | January 30, 2008 | Mount Lemmon | Mount Lemmon Survey | · | 1.9 km | MPC · JPL |

== 479101–479200 ==
back to top

| Designation | | | Discovery | | | Properties | | Ref |
| Permanent | Provisional | Named after | Date | Site | Discoverer(s) | Category | Diam. | Ref |
|---|---|---|---|---|---|---|---|---|
| 479101 | 2013 AN_{142} | — | October 3, 2011 | XuYi | PMO NEO Survey Program | · | 2.4 km | MPC · JPL |
| 479102 | 2013 AE_{153} | — | October 15, 2007 | Mount Lemmon | Mount Lemmon Survey | · | 1.4 km | MPC · JPL |
| 479103 | 2013 AW_{154} | — | October 2, 2006 | Mount Lemmon | Mount Lemmon Survey | EOS | 1.3 km | MPC · JPL |
| 479104 | 2013 AN_{156} | — | November 19, 2006 | Kitt Peak | Spacewatch | · | 3.0 km | MPC · JPL |
| 479105 | 2013 AP_{160} | — | September 19, 2011 | Catalina | CSS | · | 2.2 km | MPC · JPL |
| 479106 | 2013 AE_{163} | — | November 16, 2001 | Kitt Peak | Spacewatch | · | 1.6 km | MPC · JPL |
| 479107 | 2013 AS_{163} | — | September 12, 2007 | Catalina | CSS | · | 1.7 km | MPC · JPL |
| 479108 | 2013 AU_{164} | — | October 20, 2011 | Mount Lemmon | Mount Lemmon Survey | EOS | 1.7 km | MPC · JPL |
| 479109 | 2013 AH_{168} | — | April 21, 2009 | Kitt Peak | Spacewatch | · | 2.5 km | MPC · JPL |
| 479110 | 2013 AO_{168} | — | September 23, 2011 | Kitt Peak | Spacewatch | EMA | 2.6 km | MPC · JPL |
| 479111 | 2013 AH_{169} | — | September 26, 2005 | Kitt Peak | Spacewatch | · | 2.9 km | MPC · JPL |
| 479112 | 2013 AQ_{170} | — | October 12, 2007 | Kitt Peak | Spacewatch | · | 1.4 km | MPC · JPL |
| 479113 | 2013 AS_{177} | — | November 7, 2007 | Catalina | CSS | · | 1.8 km | MPC · JPL |
| 479114 | 2013 AR_{182} | — | May 20, 2005 | Mount Lemmon | Mount Lemmon Survey | · | 1.9 km | MPC · JPL |
| 479115 | 2013 BO_{2} | — | January 13, 2005 | Kitt Peak | Spacewatch | · | 1.1 km | MPC · JPL |
| 479116 | 2013 BU_{9} | — | April 29, 2009 | Mount Lemmon | Mount Lemmon Survey | · | 2.1 km | MPC · JPL |
| 479117 | 2013 BY_{14} | — | February 2, 2008 | Kitt Peak | Spacewatch | · | 1.9 km | MPC · JPL |
| 479118 | 2013 BK_{19} | — | December 15, 2007 | Mount Lemmon | Mount Lemmon Survey | DOR | 2.0 km | MPC · JPL |
| 479119 | 2013 BN_{19} | — | October 15, 2007 | Kitt Peak | Spacewatch | · | 1.6 km | MPC · JPL |
| 479120 | 2013 BU_{20} | — | January 10, 2008 | Mount Lemmon | Mount Lemmon Survey | · | 2.5 km | MPC · JPL |
| 479121 | 2013 BY_{20} | — | February 10, 2008 | Mount Lemmon | Mount Lemmon Survey | · | 2.1 km | MPC · JPL |
| 479122 | 2013 BZ_{20} | — | January 8, 2000 | Kitt Peak | Spacewatch | · | 1.6 km | MPC · JPL |
| 479123 | 2013 BR_{22} | — | August 29, 2006 | Kitt Peak | Spacewatch | · | 1.9 km | MPC · JPL |
| 479124 | 2013 BW_{23} | — | May 24, 2010 | WISE | WISE | · | 3.3 km | MPC · JPL |
| 479125 | 2013 BR_{25} | — | September 17, 2006 | Kitt Peak | Spacewatch | · | 1.3 km | MPC · JPL |
| 479126 | 2013 BD_{26} | — | June 16, 2010 | WISE | WISE | · | 4.1 km | MPC · JPL |
| 479127 | 2013 BA_{27} | — | October 13, 2007 | Mount Lemmon | Mount Lemmon Survey | · | 1.5 km | MPC · JPL |
| 479128 | 2013 BH_{28} | — | November 17, 2006 | Kitt Peak | Spacewatch | · | 2.1 km | MPC · JPL |
| 479129 | 2013 BB_{30} | — | October 20, 2006 | Mount Lemmon | Mount Lemmon Survey | · | 2.4 km | MPC · JPL |
| 479130 | 2013 BA_{37} | — | January 8, 1999 | Kitt Peak | Spacewatch | DOR | 2.2 km | MPC · JPL |
| 479131 | 2013 BN_{38} | — | October 14, 2007 | Mount Lemmon | Mount Lemmon Survey | DOR | 2.0 km | MPC · JPL |
| 479132 | 2013 BM_{39} | — | February 2, 2008 | Mount Lemmon | Mount Lemmon Survey | · | 1.6 km | MPC · JPL |
| 479133 | 2013 BS_{41} | — | January 21, 2002 | Kitt Peak | Spacewatch | · | 3.1 km | MPC · JPL |
| 479134 | 2013 BC_{48} | — | February 10, 2002 | Socorro | LINEAR | · | 3.2 km | MPC · JPL |
| 479135 | 2013 BZ_{48} | — | March 1, 2005 | Kitt Peak | Spacewatch | · | 1.3 km | MPC · JPL |
| 479136 | 2013 BD_{51} | — | January 7, 2013 | Kitt Peak | Spacewatch | · | 1.3 km | MPC · JPL |
| 479137 | 2013 BE_{51} | — | February 8, 2008 | Mount Lemmon | Mount Lemmon Survey | · | 2.6 km | MPC · JPL |
| 479138 | 2013 BK_{54} | — | September 8, 2011 | Kitt Peak | Spacewatch | AGN | 1.1 km | MPC · JPL |
| 479139 | 2013 BY_{54} | — | March 11, 2008 | Mount Lemmon | Mount Lemmon Survey | · | 3.1 km | MPC · JPL |
| 479140 | 2013 BM_{57} | — | December 20, 2007 | Kitt Peak | Spacewatch | · | 1.9 km | MPC · JPL |
| 479141 | 2013 BU_{57} | — | December 7, 2012 | Mount Lemmon | Mount Lemmon Survey | · | 2.1 km | MPC · JPL |
| 479142 | 2013 BY_{58} | — | November 2, 2007 | Mount Lemmon | Mount Lemmon Survey | · | 1.6 km | MPC · JPL |
| 479143 | 2013 BU_{61} | — | January 18, 2013 | Kitt Peak | Spacewatch | · | 2.8 km | MPC · JPL |
| 479144 | 2013 BZ_{62} | — | February 12, 2008 | Mount Lemmon | Mount Lemmon Survey | · | 3.1 km | MPC · JPL |
| 479145 | 2013 BP_{65} | — | December 29, 2003 | Anderson Mesa | LONEOS | · | 1.7 km | MPC · JPL |
| 479146 | 2013 BF_{67} | — | March 1, 2008 | Kitt Peak | Spacewatch | · | 3.4 km | MPC · JPL |
| 479147 | 2013 BZ_{70} | — | January 22, 2013 | Mount Lemmon | Mount Lemmon Survey | · | 2.7 km | MPC · JPL |
| 479148 | 2013 BN_{71} | — | September 24, 2011 | Mount Lemmon | Mount Lemmon Survey | AGN | 1.2 km | MPC · JPL |
| 479149 | 2013 BG_{73} | — | December 15, 2006 | Kitt Peak | Spacewatch | · | 3.5 km | MPC · JPL |
| 479150 | 2013 BH_{74} | — | August 30, 2005 | Kitt Peak | Spacewatch | · | 3.3 km | MPC · JPL |
| 479151 | 2013 BJ_{74} | — | February 2, 2008 | Kitt Peak | Spacewatch | · | 3.3 km | MPC · JPL |
| 479152 | 2013 BP_{76} | — | January 9, 2013 | Kitt Peak | Spacewatch | · | 3.2 km | MPC · JPL |
| 479153 | 2013 BR_{79} | — | January 10, 2007 | Kitt Peak | Spacewatch | · | 3.1 km | MPC · JPL |
| 479154 | 2013 CG | — | December 11, 2012 | Mount Lemmon | Mount Lemmon Survey | · | 3.3 km | MPC · JPL |
| 479155 | 2013 CD_{6} | — | October 23, 2011 | Mount Lemmon | Mount Lemmon Survey | · | 2.3 km | MPC · JPL |
| 479156 | 2013 CN_{6} | — | December 4, 2007 | Kitt Peak | Spacewatch | · | 1.6 km | MPC · JPL |
| 479157 | 2013 CS_{6} | — | March 6, 2008 | Mount Lemmon | Mount Lemmon Survey | VER | 3.6 km | MPC · JPL |
| 479158 | 2013 CH_{8} | — | October 9, 2007 | Catalina | CSS | · | 1.5 km | MPC · JPL |
| 479159 | 2013 CL_{14} | — | June 7, 2010 | WISE | WISE | · | 4.8 km | MPC · JPL |
| 479160 | 2013 CU_{14} | — | November 1, 2006 | Mount Lemmon | Mount Lemmon Survey | · | 1.7 km | MPC · JPL |
| 479161 | 2013 CB_{15} | — | February 1, 2013 | Kitt Peak | Spacewatch | EOS | 1.3 km | MPC · JPL |
| 479162 | 2013 CO_{17} | — | September 17, 2010 | Mount Lemmon | Mount Lemmon Survey | VER | 2.6 km | MPC · JPL |
| 479163 | 2013 CX_{20} | — | October 22, 2006 | Mount Lemmon | Mount Lemmon Survey | · | 2.5 km | MPC · JPL |
| 479164 | 2013 CM_{21} | — | November 3, 2011 | Mount Lemmon | Mount Lemmon Survey | · | 3.2 km | MPC · JPL |
| 479165 | 2013 CY_{24} | — | May 20, 2010 | WISE | WISE | VER | 3.4 km | MPC · JPL |
| 479166 | 2013 CF_{29} | — | February 10, 2002 | Kitt Peak | Spacewatch | EOS | 2.0 km | MPC · JPL |
| 479167 | 2013 CT_{29} | — | October 25, 2011 | XuYi | PMO NEO Survey Program | · | 2.6 km | MPC · JPL |
| 479168 | 2013 CC_{30} | — | January 1, 2008 | Kitt Peak | Spacewatch | HOF | 2.4 km | MPC · JPL |
| 479169 | 2013 CS_{31} | — | March 3, 2008 | XuYi | PMO NEO Survey Program | · | 2.6 km | MPC · JPL |
| 479170 | 2013 CQ_{34} | — | February 24, 2008 | Mount Lemmon | Mount Lemmon Survey | · | 3.6 km | MPC · JPL |
| 479171 | 2013 CB_{37} | — | October 20, 2007 | Mount Lemmon | Mount Lemmon Survey | · | 1.4 km | MPC · JPL |
| 479172 | 2013 CC_{40} | — | February 7, 2008 | Mount Lemmon | Mount Lemmon Survey | · | 3.0 km | MPC · JPL |
| 479173 | 2013 CZ_{44} | — | December 17, 2007 | Catalina | CSS | · | 2.1 km | MPC · JPL |
| 479174 | 2013 CF_{45} | — | February 5, 2013 | Kitt Peak | Spacewatch | · | 2.3 km | MPC · JPL |
| 479175 | 2013 CO_{45} | — | September 19, 2010 | Kitt Peak | Spacewatch | EOS | 2.0 km | MPC · JPL |
| 479176 | 2013 CO_{50} | — | March 2, 2009 | Kitt Peak | Spacewatch | · | 1.1 km | MPC · JPL |
| 479177 | 2013 CE_{51} | — | February 12, 2004 | Kitt Peak | Spacewatch | · | 1.4 km | MPC · JPL |
| 479178 | 2013 CP_{52} | — | November 19, 2003 | Campo Imperatore | CINEOS | (5) | 1.3 km | MPC · JPL |
| 479179 | 2013 CR_{53} | — | March 26, 2006 | Mount Lemmon | Mount Lemmon Survey | 3:2 | 5.8 km | MPC · JPL |
| 479180 | 2013 CU_{53} | — | January 12, 2002 | Kitt Peak | Spacewatch | · | 3.0 km | MPC · JPL |
| 479181 | 2013 CA_{55} | — | October 4, 2005 | Catalina | CSS | · | 6.4 km | MPC · JPL |
| 479182 | 2013 CL_{56} | — | May 3, 2010 | WISE | WISE | · | 3.6 km | MPC · JPL |
| 479183 | 2013 CY_{56} | — | June 18, 2010 | WISE | WISE | · | 3.8 km | MPC · JPL |
| 479184 | 2013 CC_{59} | — | January 23, 2013 | Mount Lemmon | Mount Lemmon Survey | BRA | 1.4 km | MPC · JPL |
| 479185 | 2013 CW_{60} | — | September 12, 2005 | Kitt Peak | Spacewatch | · | 2.6 km | MPC · JPL |
| 479186 | 2013 CB_{63} | — | January 20, 2013 | Kitt Peak | Spacewatch | · | 3.1 km | MPC · JPL |
| 479187 | 2013 CH_{66} | — | February 8, 2002 | Kitt Peak | Spacewatch | · | 2.3 km | MPC · JPL |
| 479188 | 2013 CS_{66} | — | December 8, 2012 | Mount Lemmon | Mount Lemmon Survey | · | 2.8 km | MPC · JPL |
| 479189 | 2013 CV_{66} | — | March 26, 2008 | Mount Lemmon | Mount Lemmon Survey | · | 1.9 km | MPC · JPL |
| 479190 | 2013 CE_{67} | — | August 28, 2005 | Kitt Peak | Spacewatch | · | 2.7 km | MPC · JPL |
| 479191 | 2013 CH_{69} | — | September 23, 2011 | Kitt Peak | Spacewatch | · | 2.3 km | MPC · JPL |
| 479192 | 2013 CY_{71} | — | January 14, 2002 | Kitt Peak | Spacewatch | · | 2.6 km | MPC · JPL |
| 479193 | 2013 CG_{72} | — | January 22, 2013 | Mount Lemmon | Mount Lemmon Survey | · | 3.1 km | MPC · JPL |
| 479194 | 2013 CR_{72} | — | December 13, 2006 | Mount Lemmon | Mount Lemmon Survey | · | 3.8 km | MPC · JPL |
| 479195 | 2013 CE_{73} | — | January 4, 2013 | Kitt Peak | Spacewatch | · | 3.8 km | MPC · JPL |
| 479196 | 2013 CN_{80} | — | December 28, 2003 | Socorro | LINEAR | JUN | 960 m | MPC · JPL |
| 479197 | 2013 CA_{83} | — | January 10, 2007 | Mount Lemmon | Mount Lemmon Survey | · | 2.5 km | MPC · JPL |
| 479198 | 2013 CK_{83} | — | September 3, 2010 | Mount Lemmon | Mount Lemmon Survey | · | 3.1 km | MPC · JPL |
| 479199 | 2013 CA_{85} | — | March 23, 2003 | Kitt Peak | Spacewatch | · | 2.8 km | MPC · JPL |
| 479200 | 2013 CW_{86} | — | October 31, 2005 | Kitt Peak | Spacewatch | · | 3.1 km | MPC · JPL |

== 479201–479300 ==
back to top

| Designation | | | Discovery | | | Properties | | Ref |
| Permanent | Provisional | Named after | Date | Site | Discoverer(s) | Category | Diam. | Ref |
|---|---|---|---|---|---|---|---|---|
| 479201 | 2013 CS_{90} | — | February 2, 2008 | Kitt Peak | Spacewatch | · | 2.3 km | MPC · JPL |
| 479202 | 2013 CT_{101} | — | July 21, 2006 | Mount Lemmon | Mount Lemmon Survey | · | 2.3 km | MPC · JPL |
| 479203 | 2013 CN_{103} | — | November 14, 2006 | Kitt Peak | Spacewatch | · | 2.2 km | MPC · JPL |
| 479204 | 2013 CK_{107} | — | October 18, 2011 | Mount Lemmon | Mount Lemmon Survey | · | 1.9 km | MPC · JPL |
| 479205 | 2013 CQ_{109} | — | January 11, 2008 | Mount Lemmon | Mount Lemmon Survey | · | 2.0 km | MPC · JPL |
| 479206 | 2013 CB_{119} | — | January 14, 2002 | Kitt Peak | Spacewatch | · | 2.3 km | MPC · JPL |
| 479207 | 2013 CM_{124} | — | February 10, 1996 | Kitt Peak | Spacewatch | · | 4.8 km | MPC · JPL |
| 479208 | 2013 CO_{126} | — | September 2, 2010 | Mount Lemmon | Mount Lemmon Survey | · | 2.9 km | MPC · JPL |
| 479209 | 2013 CV_{127} | — | July 11, 2010 | WISE | WISE | · | 3.5 km | MPC · JPL |
| 479210 | 2013 CG_{128} | — | February 2, 2009 | Catalina | CSS | · | 1.6 km | MPC · JPL |
| 479211 | 2013 CH_{130} | — | September 24, 2011 | Mount Lemmon | Mount Lemmon Survey | · | 1.8 km | MPC · JPL |
| 479212 | 2013 CS_{132} | — | January 19, 2004 | Kitt Peak | Spacewatch | AEO | 1.2 km | MPC · JPL |
| 479213 | 2013 CZ_{155} | — | September 30, 2010 | Mount Lemmon | Mount Lemmon Survey | · | 3.3 km | MPC · JPL |
| 479214 | 2013 CD_{156} | — | February 10, 2002 | Socorro | LINEAR | · | 4.6 km | MPC · JPL |
| 479215 | 2013 CU_{159} | — | February 13, 2008 | Mount Lemmon | Mount Lemmon Survey | · | 1.8 km | MPC · JPL |
| 479216 | 2013 CS_{160} | — | November 1, 2011 | Catalina | CSS | · | 2.5 km | MPC · JPL |
| 479217 | 2013 CK_{163} | — | September 29, 2010 | Kitt Peak | Spacewatch | · | 3.1 km | MPC · JPL |
| 479218 | 2013 CC_{169} | — | February 10, 2002 | Socorro | LINEAR | · | 2.3 km | MPC · JPL |
| 479219 | 2013 CO_{177} | — | September 12, 2010 | Mount Lemmon | Mount Lemmon Survey | · | 2.8 km | MPC · JPL |
| 479220 | 2013 CR_{177} | — | September 11, 2010 | Catalina | CSS | · | 3.3 km | MPC · JPL |
| 479221 | 2013 CG_{178} | — | March 15, 2004 | Kitt Peak | Spacewatch | · | 1.9 km | MPC · JPL |
| 479222 | 2013 CV_{178} | — | February 15, 2002 | Kitt Peak | Spacewatch | · | 2.2 km | MPC · JPL |
| 479223 | 2013 CW_{178} | — | September 23, 2011 | Kitt Peak | Spacewatch | EMA | 2.8 km | MPC · JPL |
| 479224 | 2013 CY_{178} | — | November 8, 2007 | Kitt Peak | Spacewatch | AEO | 1.0 km | MPC · JPL |
| 479225 | 2013 CF_{180} | — | April 14, 2008 | Catalina | CSS | · | 2.7 km | MPC · JPL |
| 479226 | 2013 CD_{184} | — | October 10, 2007 | Catalina | CSS | JUN | 1.1 km | MPC · JPL |
| 479227 | 2013 CT_{188} | — | January 19, 2013 | Kitt Peak | Spacewatch | · | 1.7 km | MPC · JPL |
| 479228 | 2013 CK_{189} | — | November 20, 2012 | Mount Lemmon | Mount Lemmon Survey | · | 2.0 km | MPC · JPL |
| 479229 | 2013 CL_{189} | — | November 4, 2007 | Mount Lemmon | Mount Lemmon Survey | · | 1.8 km | MPC · JPL |
| 479230 | 2013 CM_{189} | — | December 17, 2001 | Socorro | LINEAR | · | 2.7 km | MPC · JPL |
| 479231 | 2013 CX_{189} | — | February 4, 2000 | Kitt Peak | Spacewatch | · | 2.1 km | MPC · JPL |
| 479232 | 2013 CS_{193} | — | November 2, 2011 | Mount Lemmon | Mount Lemmon Survey | EOS | 1.4 km | MPC · JPL |
| 479233 | 2013 CM_{205} | — | January 19, 2013 | Kitt Peak | Spacewatch | · | 2.4 km | MPC · JPL |
| 479234 | 2013 CT_{205} | — | January 30, 2008 | Mount Lemmon | Mount Lemmon Survey | · | 2.1 km | MPC · JPL |
| 479235 | 2013 CV_{205} | — | February 8, 2008 | Kitt Peak | Spacewatch | · | 1.7 km | MPC · JPL |
| 479236 | 2013 CD_{212} | — | February 9, 2008 | Kitt Peak | Spacewatch | · | 1.8 km | MPC · JPL |
| 479237 | 2013 CH_{214} | — | October 19, 2011 | Kitt Peak | Spacewatch | · | 2.5 km | MPC · JPL |
| 479238 | 2013 DN_{7} | — | May 3, 2010 | WISE | WISE | NAE | 3.4 km | MPC · JPL |
| 479239 | 2013 DC_{8} | — | April 29, 2010 | WISE | WISE | EOS | 4.6 km | MPC · JPL |
| 479240 | 2013 DU_{8} | — | July 18, 2010 | WISE | WISE | · | 3.7 km | MPC · JPL |
| 479241 | 2013 DH_{11} | — | November 13, 2006 | Catalina | CSS | · | 1.9 km | MPC · JPL |
| 479242 | 2013 DO_{12} | — | December 15, 2006 | Mount Lemmon | Mount Lemmon Survey | · | 3.1 km | MPC · JPL |
| 479243 | 2013 DP_{16} | — | March 14, 2004 | Socorro | LINEAR | · | 1.9 km | MPC · JPL |
| 479244 | 2013 EO_{1} | — | September 2, 2010 | Mount Lemmon | Mount Lemmon Survey | · | 2.7 km | MPC · JPL |
| 479245 | 2013 EE_{3} | — | June 17, 2010 | WISE | WISE | · | 4.5 km | MPC · JPL |
| 479246 | 2013 EX_{7} | — | September 5, 2010 | Mount Lemmon | Mount Lemmon Survey | · | 3.3 km | MPC · JPL |
| 479247 | 2013 EB_{11} | — | December 9, 2006 | Kitt Peak | Spacewatch | LIX | 3.5 km | MPC · JPL |
| 479248 | 2013 EV_{16} | — | January 30, 2008 | Mount Lemmon | Mount Lemmon Survey | · | 1.8 km | MPC · JPL |
| 479249 | 2013 EB_{37} | — | June 8, 2010 | WISE | WISE | · | 4.0 km | MPC · JPL |
| 479250 | 2013 EJ_{40} | — | November 30, 2003 | Kitt Peak | Spacewatch | · | 1.5 km | MPC · JPL |
| 479251 | 2013 EV_{57} | — | February 5, 2013 | Kitt Peak | Spacewatch | VER | 2.9 km | MPC · JPL |
| 479252 | 2013 EL_{69} | — | September 1, 2010 | Mount Lemmon | Mount Lemmon Survey | · | 3.4 km | MPC · JPL |
| 479253 | 2013 EK_{70} | — | January 19, 2002 | Kitt Peak | Spacewatch | · | 2.0 km | MPC · JPL |
| 479254 | 2013 ED_{81} | — | April 9, 2002 | Kitt Peak | Spacewatch | · | 2.7 km | MPC · JPL |
| 479255 | 2013 ER_{86} | — | March 11, 2013 | Kitt Peak | Spacewatch | · | 2.9 km | MPC · JPL |
| 479256 | 2013 EF_{90} | — | May 20, 2010 | WISE | WISE | T_{j} (2.99) | 4.4 km | MPC · JPL |
| 479257 | 2013 ES_{90} | — | September 15, 2007 | Mount Lemmon | Mount Lemmon Survey | · | 2.2 km | MPC · JPL |
| 479258 | 2013 EH_{101} | — | October 27, 2005 | Kitt Peak | Spacewatch | · | 3.9 km | MPC · JPL |
| 479259 | 2013 EU_{101} | — | November 28, 1999 | Kitt Peak | Spacewatch | · | 2.8 km | MPC · JPL |
| 479260 | 2013 ER_{102} | — | October 8, 2010 | Kitt Peak | Spacewatch | · | 3.8 km | MPC · JPL |
| 479261 | 2013 EP_{110} | — | May 1, 2003 | Kitt Peak | Spacewatch | · | 2.1 km | MPC · JPL |
| 479262 | 2013 EK_{111} | — | January 28, 2007 | Mount Lemmon | Mount Lemmon Survey | · | 2.4 km | MPC · JPL |
| 479263 | 2013 EN_{111} | — | March 13, 2013 | Kitt Peak | Spacewatch | EOS | 2.5 km | MPC · JPL |
| 479264 | 2013 EN_{112} | — | December 2, 2005 | Mount Lemmon | Mount Lemmon Survey | · | 3.1 km | MPC · JPL |
| 479265 | 2013 ET_{119} | — | October 10, 2005 | Catalina | CSS | · | 4.7 km | MPC · JPL |
| 479266 | 2013 EV_{121} | — | February 12, 2002 | Kitt Peak | Spacewatch | · | 2.4 km | MPC · JPL |
| 479267 | 2013 EE_{122} | — | April 15, 2008 | Mount Lemmon | Mount Lemmon Survey | · | 1.6 km | MPC · JPL |
| 479268 | 2013 FL_{1} | — | January 13, 2002 | Kitt Peak | Spacewatch | · | 2.4 km | MPC · JPL |
| 479269 | 2013 FO_{1} | — | March 4, 2008 | Mount Lemmon | Mount Lemmon Survey | · | 2.6 km | MPC · JPL |
| 479270 | 2013 FD_{3} | — | October 27, 2005 | Kitt Peak | Spacewatch | EOS | 2.4 km | MPC · JPL |
| 479271 | 2013 FU_{6} | — | January 3, 2012 | Mount Lemmon | Mount Lemmon Survey | · | 3.7 km | MPC · JPL |
| 479272 | 2013 FT_{19} | — | March 29, 2008 | Kitt Peak | Spacewatch | · | 2.5 km | MPC · JPL |
| 479273 | 2013 FS_{22} | — | March 13, 2002 | Socorro | LINEAR | · | 3.0 km | MPC · JPL |
| 479274 | 2013 FR_{25} | — | March 11, 2008 | Catalina | CSS | · | 2.6 km | MPC · JPL |
| 479275 | 2013 FX_{26} | — | September 26, 2005 | Kitt Peak | Spacewatch | · | 2.2 km | MPC · JPL |
| 479276 | 2013 GR_{2} | — | September 29, 2010 | Mount Lemmon | Mount Lemmon Survey | · | 3.7 km | MPC · JPL |
| 479277 | 2013 GW_{10} | — | March 13, 2007 | Catalina | CSS | THB | 3.1 km | MPC · JPL |
| 479278 | 2013 GC_{12} | — | October 7, 2004 | Kitt Peak | Spacewatch | · | 5.3 km | MPC · JPL |
| 479279 | 2013 GK_{12} | — | March 17, 2013 | Catalina | CSS | H | 600 m | MPC · JPL |
| 479280 | 2013 GG_{18} | — | November 30, 2011 | Kitt Peak | Spacewatch | · | 2.1 km | MPC · JPL |
| 479281 | 2013 GR_{22} | — | February 27, 2007 | Catalina | CSS | T_{j} (2.98) | 4.3 km | MPC · JPL |
| 479282 | 2013 GM_{34} | — | October 24, 2005 | Kitt Peak | Spacewatch | · | 3.0 km | MPC · JPL |
| 479283 | 2013 GO_{39} | — | April 3, 2008 | Kitt Peak | Spacewatch | · | 2.5 km | MPC · JPL |
| 479284 | 2013 GK_{45} | — | October 1, 2005 | Kitt Peak | Spacewatch | · | 2.0 km | MPC · JPL |
| 479285 | 2013 GK_{46} | — | October 2, 2005 | Mount Lemmon | Mount Lemmon Survey | · | 3.1 km | MPC · JPL |
| 479286 | 2013 GM_{46} | — | October 3, 1999 | Kitt Peak | Spacewatch | · | 5.3 km | MPC · JPL |
| 479287 | 2013 GY_{56} | — | March 11, 2007 | Kitt Peak | Spacewatch | THM | 2.2 km | MPC · JPL |
| 479288 | 2013 GE_{69} | — | March 14, 2005 | Mount Lemmon | Mount Lemmon Survey | · | 400 m | MPC · JPL |
| 479289 | 2013 GL_{76} | — | March 12, 2008 | Kitt Peak | Spacewatch | · | 1.7 km | MPC · JPL |
| 479290 | 2013 GD_{83} | — | December 8, 2005 | Kitt Peak | Spacewatch | · | 3.8 km | MPC · JPL |
| 479291 | 2013 GH_{91} | — | April 27, 2009 | Mount Lemmon | Mount Lemmon Survey | · | 1.9 km | MPC · JPL |
| 479292 | 2013 GQ_{91} | — | February 10, 2008 | Mount Lemmon | Mount Lemmon Survey | · | 2.4 km | MPC · JPL |
| 479293 | 2013 GG_{95} | — | March 10, 2007 | Mount Lemmon | Mount Lemmon Survey | · | 3.4 km | MPC · JPL |
| 479294 | 2013 GN_{102} | — | October 12, 2005 | Kitt Peak | Spacewatch | LIX | 3.0 km | MPC · JPL |
| 479295 | 2013 GT_{103} | — | February 23, 2007 | Catalina | CSS | · | 3.8 km | MPC · JPL |
| 479296 | 2013 GF_{136} | — | October 25, 2005 | Kitt Peak | Spacewatch | · | 2.5 km | MPC · JPL |
| 479297 | 2013 HS_{15} | — | May 5, 2002 | Socorro | LINEAR | · | 3.7 km | MPC · JPL |
| 479298 | 2013 HY_{26} | — | October 31, 2005 | Mount Lemmon | Mount Lemmon Survey | · | 2.6 km | MPC · JPL |
| 479299 | 2013 HU_{53} | — | May 3, 2008 | Mount Lemmon | Mount Lemmon Survey | · | 2.0 km | MPC · JPL |
| 479300 | 2013 HC_{140} | — | September 7, 2000 | Kitt Peak | Spacewatch | · | 2.7 km | MPC · JPL |

== 479301–479400 ==
back to top

| Designation | | | Discovery | | | Properties | | Ref |
| Permanent | Provisional | Named after | Date | Site | Discoverer(s) | Category | Diam. | Ref |
|---|---|---|---|---|---|---|---|---|
| 479301 | 2013 HD_{144} | — | November 17, 2004 | Campo Imperatore | CINEOS | CYB | 4.1 km | MPC · JPL |
| 479302 | 2013 JT_{14} | — | May 5, 2008 | Mount Lemmon | Mount Lemmon Survey | H | 420 m | MPC · JPL |
| 479303 | 2013 JL_{17} | — | October 18, 2001 | Socorro | LINEAR | H | 600 m | MPC · JPL |
| 479304 | 2013 JX_{17} | — | April 7, 2008 | Mount Lemmon | Mount Lemmon Survey | H | 520 m | MPC · JPL |
| 479305 | 2013 JM_{20} | — | November 21, 2009 | Mount Lemmon | Mount Lemmon Survey | H | 510 m | MPC · JPL |
| 479306 | 2013 JD_{33} | — | October 24, 2005 | Kitt Peak | Spacewatch | T_{j} (2.99) | 4.1 km | MPC · JPL |
| 479307 | 2013 KF_{3} | — | September 19, 2001 | Socorro | LINEAR | H | 580 m | MPC · JPL |
| 479308 | 2013 LZ_{6} | — | November 3, 2011 | Kitt Peak | Spacewatch | H | 390 m | MPC · JPL |
| 479309 | 2013 LK_{17} | — | December 2, 2005 | Kitt Peak | Spacewatch | · | 3.0 km | MPC · JPL |
| 479310 | 2013 MA | — | June 9, 2013 | Mount Lemmon | Mount Lemmon Survey | H | 460 m | MPC · JPL |
| 479311 | 2013 ME_{7} | — | September 27, 2006 | Mount Lemmon | Mount Lemmon Survey | H | 530 m | MPC · JPL |
| 479312 | 2013 MS_{7} | — | January 2, 2003 | Socorro | LINEAR | · | 2.8 km | MPC · JPL |
| 479313 | 2013 NC_{2} | — | December 28, 2011 | Catalina | CSS | H | 550 m | MPC · JPL |
| 479314 | 2013 OQ_{3} | — | March 17, 2007 | Catalina | CSS | · | 490 m | MPC · JPL |
| 479315 | 2013 PS_{6} | — | June 10, 2013 | Mount Lemmon | Mount Lemmon Survey | H | 560 m | MPC · JPL |
| 479316 | 2013 PF_{44} | — | January 30, 2004 | Kitt Peak | Spacewatch | H | 350 m | MPC · JPL |
| 479317 | 2013 PB_{47} | — | August 9, 2013 | Kitt Peak | Spacewatch | H | 460 m | MPC · JPL |
| 479318 | 2013 QJ_{11} | — | October 8, 2008 | Catalina | CSS | H | 540 m | MPC · JPL |
| 479319 | 2013 QQ_{17} | — | March 14, 2012 | Catalina | CSS | H | 570 m | MPC · JPL |
| 479320 | 2013 RW_{12} | — | January 20, 2009 | Catalina | CSS | H | 480 m | MPC · JPL |
| 479321 | 2013 SL_{24} | — | May 13, 2004 | Socorro | LINEAR | H | 650 m | MPC · JPL |
| 479322 | 2013 SO_{39} | — | November 27, 2010 | Mount Lemmon | Mount Lemmon Survey | · | 590 m | MPC · JPL |
| 479323 | 2013 SL_{50} | — | September 15, 2006 | Kitt Peak | Spacewatch | · | 610 m | MPC · JPL |
| 479324 | 2013 SB_{71} | — | October 9, 2010 | Mount Lemmon | Mount Lemmon Survey | · | 580 m | MPC · JPL |
| 479325 | 2013 TV_{5} | — | October 3, 2013 | Catalina | CSS | APO · fast | 510 m | MPC · JPL |
| 479326 | 2013 TG_{25} | — | September 14, 2013 | Mount Lemmon | Mount Lemmon Survey | · | 650 m | MPC · JPL |
| 479327 | 2013 TS_{37} | — | December 30, 2007 | Kitt Peak | Spacewatch | · | 660 m | MPC · JPL |
| 479328 | 2013 TY_{49} | — | October 30, 2010 | Kitt Peak | Spacewatch | · | 710 m | MPC · JPL |
| 479329 | 2013 TP_{84} | — | December 4, 2010 | Mount Lemmon | Mount Lemmon Survey | · | 750 m | MPC · JPL |
| 479330 | 2013 TM_{89} | — | September 18, 2003 | Kitt Peak | Spacewatch | · | 620 m | MPC · JPL |
| 479331 | 2013 TX_{113} | — | October 3, 2013 | Kitt Peak | Spacewatch | · | 1.4 km | MPC · JPL |
| 479332 | 2013 TU_{124} | — | April 4, 2005 | Catalina | CSS | · | 830 m | MPC · JPL |
| 479333 | 2013 WU | — | November 21, 2000 | Socorro | LINEAR | H | 650 m | MPC · JPL |
| 479334 | 2013 WC_{4} | — | December 15, 2006 | Kitt Peak | Spacewatch | NYS | 840 m | MPC · JPL |
| 479335 | 2013 WR_{4} | — | February 2, 2008 | Kitt Peak | Spacewatch | · | 590 m | MPC · JPL |
| 479336 | 2013 WM_{9} | — | October 20, 2003 | Kitt Peak | Spacewatch | · | 400 m | MPC · JPL |
| 479337 | 2013 WS_{10} | — | October 18, 2000 | Kitt Peak | Spacewatch | · | 690 m | MPC · JPL |
| 479338 | 2013 WK_{19} | — | January 8, 2011 | Mount Lemmon | Mount Lemmon Survey | V | 520 m | MPC · JPL |
| 479339 | 2013 WP_{26} | — | October 23, 2006 | Kitt Peak | Spacewatch | V | 640 m | MPC · JPL |
| 479340 | 2013 WD_{28} | — | April 2, 2005 | Kitt Peak | Spacewatch | · | 580 m | MPC · JPL |
| 479341 | 2013 WP_{35} | — | October 7, 2013 | Mount Lemmon | Mount Lemmon Survey | · | 490 m | MPC · JPL |
| 479342 | 2013 WX_{47} | — | November 5, 2007 | Mount Lemmon | Mount Lemmon Survey | · | 980 m | MPC · JPL |
| 479343 | 2013 WY_{48} | — | February 26, 2008 | Mount Lemmon | Mount Lemmon Survey | · | 780 m | MPC · JPL |
| 479344 | 2013 WT_{64} | — | October 4, 2006 | Mount Lemmon | Mount Lemmon Survey | · | 840 m | MPC · JPL |
| 479345 | 2013 WY_{67} | — | November 27, 2013 | Haleakala | Pan-STARRS 1 | APO | 510 m | MPC · JPL |
| 479346 | 2013 WV_{72} | — | December 10, 2010 | Mount Lemmon | Mount Lemmon Survey | · | 730 m | MPC · JPL |
| 479347 | 2013 WW_{73} | — | October 22, 2006 | Mount Lemmon | Mount Lemmon Survey | · | 590 m | MPC · JPL |
| 479348 | 2013 WF_{74} | — | January 10, 2010 | Siding Spring | SSS | · | 2.6 km | MPC · JPL |
| 479349 | 2013 WG_{85} | — | October 20, 1998 | Kitt Peak | Spacewatch | · | 920 m | MPC · JPL |
| 479350 | 2013 WZ_{91} | — | August 28, 2006 | Kitt Peak | Spacewatch | · | 620 m | MPC · JPL |
| 479351 | 2013 WY_{92} | — | November 28, 2013 | Mount Lemmon | Mount Lemmon Survey | · | 900 m | MPC · JPL |
| 479352 | 2013 WA_{95} | — | December 2, 2010 | Mount Lemmon | Mount Lemmon Survey | · | 1.3 km | MPC · JPL |
| 479353 | 2013 WZ_{97} | — | December 23, 2006 | Mount Lemmon | Mount Lemmon Survey | · | 1.2 km | MPC · JPL |
| 479354 | 2013 WK_{106} | — | December 10, 2006 | Socorro | LINEAR | PHO | 1.4 km | MPC · JPL |
| 479355 | 2013 WL_{106} | — | February 11, 2011 | Mount Lemmon | Mount Lemmon Survey | · | 870 m | MPC · JPL |
| 479356 | 2013 XZ_{1} | — | October 16, 2003 | Kitt Peak | Spacewatch | · | 1.9 km | MPC · JPL |
| 479357 | 2013 XP_{2} | — | February 15, 2008 | Siding Spring | SSS | · | 1.0 km | MPC · JPL |
| 479358 | 2013 XN_{8} | — | September 9, 2008 | Kitt Peak | Spacewatch | · | 1.1 km | MPC · JPL |
| 479359 | 2013 XO_{8} | — | December 30, 2007 | Kitt Peak | Spacewatch | · | 820 m | MPC · JPL |
| 479360 | 2013 XU_{8} | — | October 2, 2009 | Mount Lemmon | Mount Lemmon Survey | · | 2.2 km | MPC · JPL |
| 479361 | 2013 XV_{12} | — | February 21, 2007 | Mount Lemmon | Mount Lemmon Survey | NYS | 1.0 km | MPC · JPL |
| 479362 | 2013 XW_{12} | — | December 11, 2006 | Kitt Peak | Spacewatch | · | 540 m | MPC · JPL |
| 479363 | 2013 XY_{12} | — | November 16, 2006 | Kitt Peak | Spacewatch | · | 810 m | MPC · JPL |
| 479364 | 2013 XF_{15} | — | August 29, 2009 | Kitt Peak | Spacewatch | MAS | 530 m | MPC · JPL |
| 479365 | 2013 XK_{15} | — | October 31, 2013 | Mount Lemmon | Mount Lemmon Survey | · | 760 m | MPC · JPL |
| 479366 | 2013 XS_{15} | — | November 16, 2006 | Kitt Peak | Spacewatch | · | 670 m | MPC · JPL |
| 479367 | 2013 XH_{16} | — | December 24, 2006 | Kitt Peak | Spacewatch | · | 960 m | MPC · JPL |
| 479368 | 2013 XJ_{16} | — | April 11, 2012 | Mount Lemmon | Mount Lemmon Survey | · | 630 m | MPC · JPL |
| 479369 | 2013 XA_{18} | — | October 28, 1995 | Kitt Peak | Spacewatch | · | 780 m | MPC · JPL |
| 479370 | 2013 XX_{19} | — | February 9, 2007 | Kitt Peak | Spacewatch | MAS | 690 m | MPC · JPL |
| 479371 | 2013 XB_{20} | — | October 14, 2009 | Mount Lemmon | Mount Lemmon Survey | · | 1.3 km | MPC · JPL |
| 479372 | 2013 XF_{20} | — | October 10, 2012 | Mount Lemmon | Mount Lemmon Survey | · | 1.6 km | MPC · JPL |
| 479373 | 2013 XL_{20} | — | December 21, 2006 | Kitt Peak | Spacewatch | · | 840 m | MPC · JPL |
| 479374 | 2013 XR_{20} | — | January 11, 2011 | Kitt Peak | Spacewatch | · | 630 m | MPC · JPL |
| 479375 | 2013 XD_{21} | — | December 24, 2006 | Kitt Peak | Spacewatch | PHO | 980 m | MPC · JPL |
| 479376 | 2013 XZ_{23} | — | November 26, 2013 | Mount Lemmon | Mount Lemmon Survey | · | 1.2 km | MPC · JPL |
| 479377 | 2013 XQ_{24} | — | January 15, 2005 | Kitt Peak | Spacewatch | · | 1.9 km | MPC · JPL |
| 479378 | 2013 XA_{25} | — | October 17, 2009 | Mount Lemmon | Mount Lemmon Survey | · | 1.1 km | MPC · JPL |
| 479379 | 2013 YM_{1} | — | October 10, 2012 | Mount Lemmon | Mount Lemmon Survey | · | 2.1 km | MPC · JPL |
| 479380 | 2013 YT_{1} | — | April 15, 2010 | Mount Lemmon | Mount Lemmon Survey | DOR | 2.3 km | MPC · JPL |
| 479381 | 2013 YR_{3} | — | February 25, 2011 | Mount Lemmon | Mount Lemmon Survey | · | 820 m | MPC · JPL |
| 479382 | 2013 YA_{4} | — | November 21, 2009 | Mount Lemmon | Mount Lemmon Survey | · | 1.5 km | MPC · JPL |
| 479383 | 2013 YC_{5} | — | October 4, 2006 | Mount Lemmon | Mount Lemmon Survey | · | 520 m | MPC · JPL |
| 479384 | 2013 YN_{7} | — | October 22, 2006 | Kitt Peak | Spacewatch | · | 610 m | MPC · JPL |
| 479385 | 2013 YV_{8} | — | November 1, 1999 | Kitt Peak | Spacewatch | · | 580 m | MPC · JPL |
| 479386 | 2013 YZ_{10} | — | November 14, 1998 | Kitt Peak | Spacewatch | · | 980 m | MPC · JPL |
| 479387 | 2013 YD_{11} | — | July 30, 2008 | Kitt Peak | Spacewatch | · | 1.5 km | MPC · JPL |
| 479388 | 2013 YF_{11} | — | September 19, 2009 | Mount Lemmon | Mount Lemmon Survey | · | 630 m | MPC · JPL |
| 479389 | 2013 YN_{11} | — | January 31, 2010 | WISE | WISE | PHO | 1.3 km | MPC · JPL |
| 479390 | 2013 YR_{13} | — | January 27, 2010 | WISE | WISE | PHO | 3.5 km | MPC · JPL |
| 479391 | 2013 YA_{16} | — | November 27, 2009 | Mount Lemmon | Mount Lemmon Survey | · | 2.0 km | MPC · JPL |
| 479392 | 2013 YM_{16} | — | November 23, 2009 | Mount Lemmon | Mount Lemmon Survey | · | 800 m | MPC · JPL |
| 479393 | 2013 YX_{20} | — | October 20, 2003 | Kitt Peak | Spacewatch | · | 620 m | MPC · JPL |
| 479394 | 2013 YE_{24} | — | October 21, 2009 | Mount Lemmon | Mount Lemmon Survey | PHO | 1.0 km | MPC · JPL |
| 479395 | 2013 YS_{26} | — | March 16, 2010 | Catalina | CSS | · | 2.3 km | MPC · JPL |
| 479396 | 2013 YF_{27} | — | December 27, 2006 | Mount Lemmon | Mount Lemmon Survey | MAS | 800 m | MPC · JPL |
| 479397 | 2013 YA_{28} | — | October 21, 2006 | Mount Lemmon | Mount Lemmon Survey | · | 560 m | MPC · JPL |
| 479398 | 2013 YN_{28} | — | March 2, 2011 | Kitt Peak | Spacewatch | · | 1.0 km | MPC · JPL |
| 479399 | 2013 YJ_{29} | — | September 17, 2013 | Mount Lemmon | Mount Lemmon Survey | (5) | 1.3 km | MPC · JPL |
| 479400 | 2013 YY_{29} | — | August 16, 2009 | Kitt Peak | Spacewatch | · | 640 m | MPC · JPL |

== 479401–479500 ==
back to top

| Designation | | | Discovery | | | Properties | | Ref |
| Permanent | Provisional | Named after | Date | Site | Discoverer(s) | Category | Diam. | Ref |
|---|---|---|---|---|---|---|---|---|
| 479401 | 2013 YZ_{29} | — | January 10, 2007 | Mount Lemmon | Mount Lemmon Survey | · | 750 m | MPC · JPL |
| 479402 | 2013 YB_{33} | — | February 23, 2007 | Kitt Peak | Spacewatch | · | 1 km | MPC · JPL |
| 479403 | 2013 YL_{33} | — | December 18, 2003 | Socorro | LINEAR | PHO | 780 m | MPC · JPL |
| 479404 | 2013 YY_{34} | — | September 22, 2009 | Kitt Peak | Spacewatch | · | 940 m | MPC · JPL |
| 479405 | 2013 YY_{41} | — | February 21, 2007 | Mount Lemmon | Mount Lemmon Survey | · | 1 km | MPC · JPL |
| 479406 | 2013 YM_{42} | — | April 30, 2006 | Kitt Peak | Spacewatch | · | 1.8 km | MPC · JPL |
| 479407 | 2013 YR_{47} | — | January 15, 2010 | Catalina | CSS | (194) | 2.1 km | MPC · JPL |
| 479408 | 2013 YQ_{49} | — | February 26, 2003 | Campo Imperatore | CINEOS | · | 1.0 km | MPC · JPL |
| 479409 | 2013 YV_{49} | — | January 7, 2010 | Kitt Peak | Spacewatch | MAR | 990 m | MPC · JPL |
| 479410 | 2013 YV_{58} | — | September 24, 2008 | Mount Lemmon | Mount Lemmon Survey | · | 1.6 km | MPC · JPL |
| 479411 | 2013 YU_{60} | — | November 16, 2009 | Mount Lemmon | Mount Lemmon Survey | V | 540 m | MPC · JPL |
| 479412 | 2013 YG_{61} | — | August 25, 2004 | Kitt Peak | Spacewatch | · | 1.4 km | MPC · JPL |
| 479413 | 2013 YR_{65} | — | June 3, 2011 | Mount Lemmon | Mount Lemmon Survey | EUN | 1.3 km | MPC · JPL |
| 479414 | 2013 YY_{66} | — | December 15, 2006 | Kitt Peak | Spacewatch | · | 770 m | MPC · JPL |
| 479415 | 2013 YR_{72} | — | April 11, 2010 | WISE | WISE | LIX | 3.4 km | MPC · JPL |
| 479416 | 2013 YV_{72} | — | February 21, 2007 | Mount Lemmon | Mount Lemmon Survey | · | 1.1 km | MPC · JPL |
| 479417 | 2013 YG_{73} | — | October 9, 2005 | Kitt Peak | Spacewatch | · | 1.2 km | MPC · JPL |
| 479418 | 2013 YT_{74} | — | December 21, 2006 | Kitt Peak | Spacewatch | · | 620 m | MPC · JPL |
| 479419 | 2013 YY_{75} | — | December 21, 2006 | Mount Lemmon | Mount Lemmon Survey | · | 600 m | MPC · JPL |
| 479420 | 2013 YS_{76} | — | March 25, 2000 | Kitt Peak | Spacewatch | NYS | 980 m | MPC · JPL |
| 479421 | 2013 YT_{77} | — | October 30, 2005 | Kitt Peak | Spacewatch | · | 1.1 km | MPC · JPL |
| 479422 | 2013 YR_{78} | — | September 24, 2005 | Kitt Peak | Spacewatch | NYS | 1.2 km | MPC · JPL |
| 479423 | 2013 YG_{80} | — | October 5, 2005 | Kitt Peak | Spacewatch | MAS | 600 m | MPC · JPL |
| 479424 | 2013 YV_{82} | — | November 27, 2006 | Mount Lemmon | Mount Lemmon Survey | · | 840 m | MPC · JPL |
| 479425 | 2013 YX_{83} | — | April 26, 2011 | Mount Lemmon | Mount Lemmon Survey | · | 1.1 km | MPC · JPL |
| 479426 | 2013 YK_{84} | — | October 26, 2009 | Kitt Peak | Spacewatch | V | 550 m | MPC · JPL |
| 479427 | 2013 YW_{86} | — | March 9, 2007 | Catalina | CSS | · | 880 m | MPC · JPL |
| 479428 | 2013 YR_{88} | — | April 24, 2007 | Mount Lemmon | Mount Lemmon Survey | · | 1.5 km | MPC · JPL |
| 479429 | 2013 YE_{90} | — | September 29, 2005 | Mount Lemmon | Mount Lemmon Survey | · | 870 m | MPC · JPL |
| 479430 | 2013 YQ_{90} | — | December 28, 2013 | Kitt Peak | Spacewatch | · | 1.5 km | MPC · JPL |
| 479431 | 2013 YW_{90} | — | February 8, 2007 | Kitt Peak | Spacewatch | · | 610 m | MPC · JPL |
| 479432 | 2013 YC_{93} | — | March 28, 2011 | Mount Lemmon | Mount Lemmon Survey | · | 730 m | MPC · JPL |
| 479433 | 2013 YG_{95} | — | December 4, 2005 | Kitt Peak | Spacewatch | · | 1.8 km | MPC · JPL |
| 479434 | 2013 YC_{99} | — | September 18, 2009 | Kitt Peak | Spacewatch | NYS | 860 m | MPC · JPL |
| 479435 | 2013 YT_{99} | — | August 28, 2009 | Kitt Peak | Spacewatch | · | 950 m | MPC · JPL |
| 479436 | 2013 YD_{100} | — | March 12, 2007 | Mount Lemmon | Mount Lemmon Survey | MAS | 650 m | MPC · JPL |
| 479437 | 2013 YD_{101} | — | August 28, 2005 | Kitt Peak | Spacewatch | · | 920 m | MPC · JPL |
| 479438 | 2013 YM_{101} | — | June 13, 2005 | Mount Lemmon | Mount Lemmon Survey | · | 3.5 km | MPC · JPL |
| 479439 | 2013 YM_{104} | — | November 4, 2005 | Catalina | CSS | · | 1.4 km | MPC · JPL |
| 479440 | 2013 YF_{109} | — | December 24, 2013 | Mount Lemmon | Mount Lemmon Survey | MAR | 1.1 km | MPC · JPL |
| 479441 | 2013 YH_{109} | — | December 14, 2006 | Kitt Peak | Spacewatch | V | 720 m | MPC · JPL |
| 479442 | 2013 YM_{109} | — | April 2, 2011 | Kitt Peak | Spacewatch | · | 1.3 km | MPC · JPL |
| 479443 | 2013 YH_{110} | — | September 30, 2003 | Kitt Peak | Spacewatch | · | 2.2 km | MPC · JPL |
| 479444 | 2013 YD_{111} | — | December 28, 2013 | Kitt Peak | Spacewatch | V | 550 m | MPC · JPL |
| 479445 | 2013 YE_{114} | — | April 8, 2003 | Kitt Peak | Spacewatch | MAS | 640 m | MPC · JPL |
| 479446 | 2013 YQ_{115} | — | August 30, 2005 | Kitt Peak | Spacewatch | NYS | 1 km | MPC · JPL |
| 479447 | 2013 YL_{117} | — | September 26, 2005 | Kitt Peak | Spacewatch | MAS | 730 m | MPC · JPL |
| 479448 | 2013 YM_{118} | — | April 25, 2004 | Kitt Peak | Spacewatch | · | 930 m | MPC · JPL |
| 479449 | 2013 YT_{120} | — | January 27, 2007 | Kitt Peak | Spacewatch | MAS | 490 m | MPC · JPL |
| 479450 | 2013 YZ_{120} | — | September 15, 2009 | Kitt Peak | Spacewatch | · | 610 m | MPC · JPL |
| 479451 | 2013 YJ_{121} | — | March 12, 2010 | WISE | WISE | · | 2.3 km | MPC · JPL |
| 479452 | 2013 YB_{123} | — | December 15, 2006 | Mount Lemmon | Mount Lemmon Survey | · | 900 m | MPC · JPL |
| 479453 | 2013 YX_{123} | — | December 13, 2006 | Kitt Peak | Spacewatch | · | 610 m | MPC · JPL |
| 479454 | 2013 YT_{124} | — | December 13, 1998 | Kitt Peak | Spacewatch | · | 1.2 km | MPC · JPL |
| 479455 | 2013 YD_{125} | — | December 30, 2013 | Mount Lemmon | Mount Lemmon Survey | V | 640 m | MPC · JPL |
| 479456 | 2013 YG_{126} | — | November 2, 2006 | Mount Lemmon | Mount Lemmon Survey | · | 670 m | MPC · JPL |
| 479457 | 2013 YL_{129} | — | November 10, 2006 | Kitt Peak | Spacewatch | · | 600 m | MPC · JPL |
| 479458 | 2013 YM_{129} | — | December 21, 2005 | Kitt Peak | Spacewatch | · | 1.4 km | MPC · JPL |
| 479459 | 2013 YS_{129} | — | December 8, 2006 | Socorro | LINEAR | · | 1.3 km | MPC · JPL |
| 479460 | 2013 YC_{131} | — | April 24, 2011 | Mount Lemmon | Mount Lemmon Survey | · | 970 m | MPC · JPL |
| 479461 | 2013 YL_{132} | — | February 16, 2004 | Kitt Peak | Spacewatch | · | 630 m | MPC · JPL |
| 479462 | 2013 YD_{133} | — | December 31, 2013 | Mount Lemmon | Mount Lemmon Survey | BAP | 960 m | MPC · JPL |
| 479463 | 2013 YC_{135} | — | January 28, 2004 | Kitt Peak | Spacewatch | · | 820 m | MPC · JPL |
| 479464 | 2013 YK_{137} | — | September 23, 2009 | Mount Lemmon | Mount Lemmon Survey | V | 490 m | MPC · JPL |
| 479465 | 2013 YD_{139} | — | May 13, 2011 | Mount Lemmon | Mount Lemmon Survey | · | 1.4 km | MPC · JPL |
| 479466 | 2013 YB_{140} | — | January 27, 2007 | Kitt Peak | Spacewatch | · | 870 m | MPC · JPL |
| 479467 | 2013 YY_{146} | — | February 8, 2011 | Mount Lemmon | Mount Lemmon Survey | · | 850 m | MPC · JPL |
| 479468 | 2013 YJ_{149} | — | August 22, 1995 | Kitt Peak | Spacewatch | · | 720 m | MPC · JPL |
| 479469 | 2014 AC_{1} | — | May 16, 2010 | WISE | WISE | · | 3.3 km | MPC · JPL |
| 479470 | 2014 AP_{1} | — | October 24, 2009 | Kitt Peak | Spacewatch | NYS | 800 m | MPC · JPL |
| 479471 | 2014 AS_{1} | — | December 14, 2003 | Kitt Peak | Spacewatch | · | 780 m | MPC · JPL |
| 479472 | 2014 AV_{1} | — | December 30, 2005 | Mount Lemmon | Mount Lemmon Survey | · | 920 m | MPC · JPL |
| 479473 | 2014 AW_{1} | — | November 16, 2006 | Kitt Peak | Spacewatch | · | 550 m | MPC · JPL |
| 479474 | 2014 AH_{2} | — | November 25, 2009 | Kitt Peak | Spacewatch | · | 1.0 km | MPC · JPL |
| 479475 | 2014 AC_{6} | — | February 26, 2007 | Mount Lemmon | Mount Lemmon Survey | · | 1.2 km | MPC · JPL |
| 479476 | 2014 AJ_{6} | — | January 25, 2007 | Kitt Peak | Spacewatch | · | 660 m | MPC · JPL |
| 479477 | 2014 AY_{6} | — | January 6, 2010 | Kitt Peak | Spacewatch | (5) | 990 m | MPC · JPL |
| 479478 | 2014 AB_{8} | — | March 26, 2011 | Mount Lemmon | Mount Lemmon Survey | · | 800 m | MPC · JPL |
| 479479 | 2014 AE_{14} | — | May 11, 2010 | WISE | WISE | · | 1.7 km | MPC · JPL |
| 479480 | 2014 AZ_{19} | — | September 19, 2001 | Socorro | LINEAR | NYS | 1.2 km | MPC · JPL |
| 479481 | 2014 AQ_{22} | — | March 14, 2010 | Catalina | CSS | EUN | 1.4 km | MPC · JPL |
| 479482 | 2014 AW_{25} | — | October 1, 2008 | Kitt Peak | Spacewatch | · | 1.2 km | MPC · JPL |
| 479483 | 2014 AY_{25} | — | November 9, 1999 | Socorro | LINEAR | · | 670 m | MPC · JPL |
| 479484 | 2014 AF_{26} | — | November 1, 2013 | Mount Lemmon | Mount Lemmon Survey | EUN | 1.2 km | MPC · JPL |
| 479485 | 2014 AR_{26} | — | November 29, 1999 | Kitt Peak | Spacewatch | · | 780 m | MPC · JPL |
| 479486 | 2014 AD_{28} | — | June 16, 2010 | WISE | WISE | · | 2.4 km | MPC · JPL |
| 479487 | 2014 AH_{28} | — | November 2, 2008 | Mount Lemmon | Mount Lemmon Survey | · | 1.5 km | MPC · JPL |
| 479488 | 2014 AZ_{31} | — | December 13, 2006 | Kitt Peak | Spacewatch | · | 860 m | MPC · JPL |
| 479489 | 2014 AG_{33} | — | February 16, 2007 | Mount Lemmon | Mount Lemmon Survey | V | 660 m | MPC · JPL |
| 479490 | 2014 AZ_{33} | — | February 14, 2010 | Mount Lemmon | Mount Lemmon Survey | · | 1.3 km | MPC · JPL |
| 479491 | 2014 AC_{34} | — | September 14, 2006 | Kitt Peak | Spacewatch | · | 530 m | MPC · JPL |
| 479492 | 2014 AE_{36} | — | December 24, 2013 | Mount Lemmon | Mount Lemmon Survey | · | 870 m | MPC · JPL |
| 479493 | 2014 AN_{36} | — | November 28, 2013 | Mount Lemmon | Mount Lemmon Survey | EUN | 970 m | MPC · JPL |
| 479494 | 2014 AU_{41} | — | September 13, 2007 | Mount Lemmon | Mount Lemmon Survey | · | 1.6 km | MPC · JPL |
| 479495 | 2014 AA_{42} | — | February 15, 2010 | Kitt Peak | Spacewatch | · | 1.4 km | MPC · JPL |
| 479496 | 2014 AN_{42} | — | November 27, 2009 | Mount Lemmon | Mount Lemmon Survey | · | 1.4 km | MPC · JPL |
| 479497 | 2014 AB_{43} | — | January 10, 1997 | Kitt Peak | Spacewatch | · | 1.7 km | MPC · JPL |
| 479498 | 2014 AB_{44} | — | March 16, 2005 | Mount Lemmon | Mount Lemmon Survey | · | 2.2 km | MPC · JPL |
| 479499 | 2014 AY_{47} | — | January 27, 2007 | Mount Lemmon | Mount Lemmon Survey | · | 760 m | MPC · JPL |
| 479500 | 2014 AW_{49} | — | September 18, 2006 | Kitt Peak | Spacewatch | · | 570 m | MPC · JPL |

== 479501–479600 ==
back to top

| Designation | | | Discovery | | | Properties | | Ref |
| Permanent | Provisional | Named after | Date | Site | Discoverer(s) | Category | Diam. | Ref |
|---|---|---|---|---|---|---|---|---|
| 479501 | 2014 AC_{53} | — | February 18, 2007 | Catalina | CSS | PHO | 1.3 km | MPC · JPL |
| 479502 | 2014 AR_{53} | — | October 8, 2008 | Mount Lemmon | Mount Lemmon Survey | JUN | 980 m | MPC · JPL |
| 479503 | 2014 AW_{54} | — | November 28, 2013 | Mount Lemmon | Mount Lemmon Survey | · | 2.2 km | MPC · JPL |
| 479504 | 2014 BR_{2} | — | January 14, 2011 | Mount Lemmon | Mount Lemmon Survey | · | 1.6 km | MPC · JPL |
| 479505 | 2014 BK_{4} | — | September 19, 2006 | Kitt Peak | Spacewatch | · | 650 m | MPC · JPL |
| 479506 | 2014 BF_{7} | — | March 10, 2007 | Mount Lemmon | Mount Lemmon Survey | MAS | 590 m | MPC · JPL |
| 479507 | 2014 BX_{7} | — | December 31, 2013 | Kitt Peak | Spacewatch | · | 1.9 km | MPC · JPL |
| 479508 | 2014 BA_{10} | — | September 14, 2005 | Kitt Peak | Spacewatch | · | 1.1 km | MPC · JPL |
| 479509 | 2014 BO_{12} | — | December 25, 2006 | Kitt Peak | Spacewatch | · | 780 m | MPC · JPL |
| 479510 | 2014 BP_{12} | — | October 23, 2012 | Mount Lemmon | Mount Lemmon Survey | · | 1.7 km | MPC · JPL |
| 479511 | 2014 BV_{15} | — | March 2, 1998 | Kitt Peak | Spacewatch | · | 2.5 km | MPC · JPL |
| 479512 | 2014 BJ_{17} | — | November 19, 2006 | Catalina | CSS | · | 660 m | MPC · JPL |
| 479513 | 2014 BY_{17} | — | December 4, 2008 | Kitt Peak | Spacewatch | · | 2.1 km | MPC · JPL |
| 479514 | 2014 BP_{20} | — | December 28, 2005 | Kitt Peak | Spacewatch | · | 1.2 km | MPC · JPL |
| 479515 | 2014 BV_{20} | — | January 16, 2005 | Kitt Peak | Spacewatch | · | 1.9 km | MPC · JPL |
| 479516 | 2014 BW_{21} | — | January 9, 2014 | Mount Lemmon | Mount Lemmon Survey | · | 1.4 km | MPC · JPL |
| 479517 | 2014 BY_{22} | — | October 5, 2004 | Kitt Peak | Spacewatch | · | 1.1 km | MPC · JPL |
| 479518 | 2014 BT_{27} | — | October 24, 2005 | Kitt Peak | Spacewatch | · | 890 m | MPC · JPL |
| 479519 | 2014 BW_{28} | — | November 21, 2006 | Mount Lemmon | Mount Lemmon Survey | NYS | 670 m | MPC · JPL |
| 479520 | 2014 BC_{29} | — | September 3, 2008 | Kitt Peak | Spacewatch | · | 1.6 km | MPC · JPL |
| 479521 | 2014 BQ_{29} | — | January 28, 2007 | Kitt Peak | Spacewatch | · | 760 m | MPC · JPL |
| 479522 | 2014 BT_{29} | — | February 14, 2010 | Mount Lemmon | Mount Lemmon Survey | · | 1.6 km | MPC · JPL |
| 479523 | 2014 BD_{30} | — | December 22, 2008 | Kitt Peak | Spacewatch | · | 1.9 km | MPC · JPL |
| 479524 | 2014 BQ_{30} | — | January 1, 2014 | Mount Lemmon | Mount Lemmon Survey | · | 3.0 km | MPC · JPL |
| 479525 | 2014 BA_{34} | — | February 2, 2006 | Mount Lemmon | Mount Lemmon Survey | · | 1.3 km | MPC · JPL |
| 479526 | 2014 BE_{34} | — | January 7, 2010 | Kitt Peak | Spacewatch | · | 1.6 km | MPC · JPL |
| 479527 | 2014 BL_{34} | — | September 20, 2009 | Kitt Peak | Spacewatch | · | 610 m | MPC · JPL |
| 479528 | 2014 BW_{35} | — | December 30, 2013 | Mount Lemmon | Mount Lemmon Survey | · | 860 m | MPC · JPL |
| 479529 | 2014 BX_{35} | — | October 25, 2005 | Kitt Peak | Spacewatch | · | 960 m | MPC · JPL |
| 479530 | 2014 BL_{36} | — | October 11, 2001 | Palomar | NEAT | · | 1.1 km | MPC · JPL |
| 479531 | 2014 BW_{36} | — | May 27, 2011 | Kitt Peak | Spacewatch | V | 720 m | MPC · JPL |
| 479532 | 2014 BS_{37} | — | March 5, 2008 | Mount Lemmon | Mount Lemmon Survey | CYB | 3.8 km | MPC · JPL |
| 479533 | 2014 BV_{37} | — | February 19, 2009 | Catalina | CSS | · | 3.8 km | MPC · JPL |
| 479534 | 2014 BS_{38} | — | November 13, 2012 | Mount Lemmon | Mount Lemmon Survey | · | 1.7 km | MPC · JPL |
| 479535 | 2014 BU_{38} | — | December 20, 2009 | Kitt Peak | Spacewatch | V | 760 m | MPC · JPL |
| 479536 | 2014 BR_{39} | — | November 22, 2005 | Kitt Peak | Spacewatch | · | 930 m | MPC · JPL |
| 479537 | 2014 BS_{39} | — | November 25, 2005 | Mount Lemmon | Mount Lemmon Survey | MAS | 690 m | MPC · JPL |
| 479538 | 2014 BX_{39} | — | January 9, 2007 | Kitt Peak | Spacewatch | · | 850 m | MPC · JPL |
| 479539 | 2014 BP_{40} | — | September 25, 2008 | Kitt Peak | Spacewatch | · | 1.3 km | MPC · JPL |
| 479540 | 2014 BS_{41} | — | September 22, 2008 | Mount Lemmon | Mount Lemmon Survey | · | 1.0 km | MPC · JPL |
| 479541 | 2014 BT_{42} | — | October 7, 2005 | Kitt Peak | Spacewatch | NYS | 1.2 km | MPC · JPL |
| 479542 | 2014 BC_{46} | — | March 12, 2010 | Mount Lemmon | Mount Lemmon Survey | · | 1.5 km | MPC · JPL |
| 479543 | 2014 BR_{46} | — | December 10, 2005 | Kitt Peak | Spacewatch | · | 1.1 km | MPC · JPL |
| 479544 | 2014 BO_{47} | — | December 15, 2006 | Kitt Peak | Spacewatch | · | 670 m | MPC · JPL |
| 479545 | 2014 BH_{53} | — | December 25, 2006 | Kitt Peak | Spacewatch | V | 720 m | MPC · JPL |
| 479546 | 2014 BU_{53} | — | February 21, 2007 | Mount Lemmon | Mount Lemmon Survey | · | 940 m | MPC · JPL |
| 479547 | 2014 BZ_{54} | — | January 11, 2010 | Kitt Peak | Spacewatch | · | 830 m | MPC · JPL |
| 479548 | 2014 BG_{55} | — | January 7, 2010 | Kitt Peak | Spacewatch | · | 2.2 km | MPC · JPL |
| 479549 | 2014 BV_{55} | — | January 24, 2007 | Catalina | CSS | · | 740 m | MPC · JPL |
| 479550 | 2014 BS_{58} | — | January 10, 2007 | Mount Lemmon | Mount Lemmon Survey | · | 630 m | MPC · JPL |
| 479551 | 2014 BU_{60} | — | December 21, 2006 | Mount Lemmon | Mount Lemmon Survey | · | 610 m | MPC · JPL |
| 479552 | 2014 BG_{61} | — | November 9, 2009 | Kitt Peak | Spacewatch | · | 1.4 km | MPC · JPL |
| 479553 Garyzema | 2014 BY_{63} | Garyzema | December 20, 2009 | Mount Lemmon | Mount Lemmon Survey | · | 2.0 km | MPC · JPL |
| 479554 | 2014 CA | — | December 13, 2013 | Mount Lemmon | Mount Lemmon Survey | · | 1.1 km | MPC · JPL |
| 479555 | 2014 CD | — | March 15, 2010 | Catalina | CSS | · | 1.5 km | MPC · JPL |
| 479556 | 2014 CK | — | October 9, 2008 | Mount Lemmon | Mount Lemmon Survey | · | 2.1 km | MPC · JPL |
| 479557 | 2014 CY | — | May 6, 2003 | Kitt Peak | Spacewatch | · | 1.3 km | MPC · JPL |
| 479558 | 2014 CP_{3} | — | October 11, 2012 | Mount Lemmon | Mount Lemmon Survey | · | 2.3 km | MPC · JPL |
| 479559 | 2014 CT_{3} | — | August 6, 1997 | Caussols | ODAS | · | 2.3 km | MPC · JPL |
| 479560 | 2014 CB_{4} | — | March 26, 2003 | Kitt Peak | Spacewatch | · | 1.3 km | MPC · JPL |
| 479561 | 2014 CG_{5} | — | March 15, 2007 | Kitt Peak | Spacewatch | NYS | 990 m | MPC · JPL |
| 479562 | 2014 CN_{5} | — | December 27, 2006 | Kitt Peak | Spacewatch | · | 690 m | MPC · JPL |
| 479563 | 2014 CU_{5} | — | May 17, 2010 | WISE | WISE | · | 3.7 km | MPC · JPL |
| 479564 | 2014 CF_{6} | — | April 28, 2011 | Mount Lemmon | Mount Lemmon Survey | · | 1.1 km | MPC · JPL |
| 479565 | 2014 CP_{6} | — | May 23, 2011 | Mount Lemmon | Mount Lemmon Survey | · | 1.1 km | MPC · JPL |
| 479566 | 2014 CF_{7} | — | December 20, 2009 | Mount Lemmon | Mount Lemmon Survey | · | 1.1 km | MPC · JPL |
| 479567 | 2014 CC_{8} | — | September 7, 2004 | Kitt Peak | Spacewatch | · | 1 km | MPC · JPL |
| 479568 | 2014 CE_{8} | — | September 16, 2006 | Catalina | CSS | · | 3.2 km | MPC · JPL |
| 479569 | 2014 CO_{8} | — | February 10, 2010 | Kitt Peak | Spacewatch | · | 1.2 km | MPC · JPL |
| 479570 | 2014 CB_{9} | — | December 25, 2009 | Kitt Peak | Spacewatch | · | 1.3 km | MPC · JPL |
| 479571 | 2014 CV_{9} | — | May 2, 2010 | WISE | WISE | · | 2.1 km | MPC · JPL |
| 479572 | 2014 CU_{11} | — | February 22, 2009 | Siding Spring | SSS | · | 3.4 km | MPC · JPL |
| 479573 | 2014 CY_{11} | — | October 29, 2005 | Kitt Peak | Spacewatch | · | 860 m | MPC · JPL |
| 479574 | 2014 CC_{12} | — | September 18, 2012 | Mount Lemmon | Mount Lemmon Survey | · | 1.3 km | MPC · JPL |
| 479575 | 2014 CM_{12} | — | April 15, 1997 | Kitt Peak | Spacewatch | · | 1.5 km | MPC · JPL |
| 479576 | 2014 CN_{15} | — | September 21, 2008 | Kitt Peak | Spacewatch | · | 1.3 km | MPC · JPL |
| 479577 | 2014 CW_{15} | — | October 8, 2008 | Mount Lemmon | Mount Lemmon Survey | (5) | 1.7 km | MPC · JPL |
| 479578 | 2014 CB_{16} | — | September 17, 2012 | Mount Lemmon | Mount Lemmon Survey | JUN | 1.0 km | MPC · JPL |
| 479579 | 2014 CS_{17} | — | November 18, 2009 | Mount Lemmon | Mount Lemmon Survey | · | 970 m | MPC · JPL |
| 479580 | 2014 CC_{18} | — | September 18, 2003 | Kitt Peak | Spacewatch | MRX | 1.1 km | MPC · JPL |
| 479581 | 2014 CK_{18} | — | February 11, 2008 | Mount Lemmon | Mount Lemmon Survey | · | 3.3 km | MPC · JPL |
| 479582 | 2014 CS_{18} | — | February 3, 2000 | Kitt Peak | Spacewatch | · | 1.9 km | MPC · JPL |
| 479583 | 2014 CV_{18} | — | October 24, 2005 | Kitt Peak | Spacewatch | · | 1.0 km | MPC · JPL |
| 479584 | 2014 CF_{20} | — | December 10, 2006 | Kitt Peak | Spacewatch | · | 660 m | MPC · JPL |
| 479585 | 2014 CB_{21} | — | January 16, 2005 | Kitt Peak | Spacewatch | · | 2.4 km | MPC · JPL |
| 479586 | 2014 CC_{22} | — | September 15, 2012 | Kitt Peak | Spacewatch | · | 1.4 km | MPC · JPL |
| 479587 | 2014 CK_{22} | — | January 13, 1996 | Kitt Peak | Spacewatch | V | 800 m | MPC · JPL |
| 479588 | 2014 CL_{22} | — | March 25, 2006 | Kitt Peak | Spacewatch | (5) | 1.4 km | MPC · JPL |
| 479589 | 2014 CM_{22} | — | April 20, 2007 | Kitt Peak | Spacewatch | · | 1.1 km | MPC · JPL |
| 479590 | 2014 CN_{22} | — | May 31, 2010 | WISE | WISE | · | 1.4 km | MPC · JPL |
| 479591 | 2014 DV | — | April 22, 2007 | Mount Lemmon | Mount Lemmon Survey | NYS | 1.2 km | MPC · JPL |
| 479592 | 2014 DD_{4} | — | January 16, 2008 | Mount Lemmon | Mount Lemmon Survey | · | 4.9 km | MPC · JPL |
| 479593 | 2014 DE_{4} | — | September 9, 2007 | Kitt Peak | Spacewatch | · | 1.8 km | MPC · JPL |
| 479594 | 2014 DS_{4} | — | March 21, 2010 | WISE | WISE | PHO | 2.2 km | MPC · JPL |
| 479595 | 2014 DG_{5} | — | December 16, 2007 | Kitt Peak | Spacewatch | · | 2.2 km | MPC · JPL |
| 479596 | 2014 DH_{5} | — | January 3, 2014 | Mount Lemmon | Mount Lemmon Survey | · | 2.2 km | MPC · JPL |
| 479597 | 2014 DN_{6} | — | October 1, 2005 | Mount Lemmon | Mount Lemmon Survey | · | 940 m | MPC · JPL |
| 479598 | 2014 DW_{7} | — | January 17, 2005 | Kitt Peak | Spacewatch | · | 1.6 km | MPC · JPL |
| 479599 | 2014 DY_{8} | — | October 29, 2005 | Mount Lemmon | Mount Lemmon Survey | MAS | 660 m | MPC · JPL |
| 479600 | 2014 DZ_{8} | — | September 3, 2007 | Catalina | CSS | · | 2.1 km | MPC · JPL |

== 479601–479700 ==
back to top

| Designation | | | Discovery | | | Properties | | Ref |
| Permanent | Provisional | Named after | Date | Site | Discoverer(s) | Category | Diam. | Ref |
|---|---|---|---|---|---|---|---|---|
| 479601 | 2014 DU_{9} | — | February 14, 2010 | Kitt Peak | Spacewatch | EUN | 1.1 km | MPC · JPL |
| 479602 | 2014 DM_{10} | — | February 12, 2004 | Kitt Peak | Spacewatch | · | 2.5 km | MPC · JPL |
| 479603 | 2014 DW_{10} | — | February 15, 2010 | WISE | WISE | · | 1.0 km | MPC · JPL |
| 479604 | 2014 DG_{13} | — | September 29, 2005 | Kitt Peak | Spacewatch | TIR | 3.3 km | MPC · JPL |
| 479605 | 2014 DR_{15} | — | April 9, 2010 | Catalina | CSS | · | 2.0 km | MPC · JPL |
| 479606 | 2014 DM_{16} | — | January 2, 2009 | Mount Lemmon | Mount Lemmon Survey | · | 2.1 km | MPC · JPL |
| 479607 | 2014 DY_{18} | — | December 31, 2002 | Kitt Peak | Spacewatch | · | 1.1 km | MPC · JPL |
| 479608 | 2014 DJ_{19} | — | January 10, 2010 | Kitt Peak | Spacewatch | · | 1.0 km | MPC · JPL |
| 479609 | 2014 DN_{19} | — | January 28, 2014 | Mount Lemmon | Mount Lemmon Survey | · | 1.6 km | MPC · JPL |
| 479610 | 2014 DJ_{20} | — | October 23, 2005 | Catalina | CSS | · | 1.1 km | MPC · JPL |
| 479611 | 2014 DT_{20} | — | April 22, 2007 | Mount Lemmon | Mount Lemmon Survey | NYS | 1.1 km | MPC · JPL |
| 479612 | 2014 DH_{21} | — | March 25, 2006 | Kitt Peak | Spacewatch | · | 1.2 km | MPC · JPL |
| 479613 | 2014 DC_{24} | — | September 20, 2003 | Kitt Peak | Spacewatch | · | 2.3 km | MPC · JPL |
| 479614 | 2014 DD_{26} | — | March 12, 2010 | Kitt Peak | Spacewatch | · | 1.4 km | MPC · JPL |
| 479615 | 2014 DL_{26} | — | January 18, 2008 | Mount Lemmon | Mount Lemmon Survey | · | 2.8 km | MPC · JPL |
| 479616 | 2014 DP_{26} | — | January 26, 2006 | Mount Lemmon | Mount Lemmon Survey | · | 1.1 km | MPC · JPL |
| 479617 | 2014 DU_{26} | — | October 21, 2009 | Mount Lemmon | Mount Lemmon Survey | · | 1.6 km | MPC · JPL |
| 479618 | 2014 DD_{29} | — | November 23, 2009 | Kitt Peak | Spacewatch | NYS | 880 m | MPC · JPL |
| 479619 | 2014 DM_{29} | — | December 16, 2007 | Mount Lemmon | Mount Lemmon Survey | · | 2.7 km | MPC · JPL |
| 479620 | 2014 DP_{30} | — | December 10, 2005 | Kitt Peak | Spacewatch | · | 1.2 km | MPC · JPL |
| 479621 | 2014 DQ_{30} | — | May 5, 1997 | Kitt Peak | Spacewatch | · | 1.7 km | MPC · JPL |
| 479622 | 2014 DH_{32} | — | October 9, 2012 | Mount Lemmon | Mount Lemmon Survey | · | 1.4 km | MPC · JPL |
| 479623 | 2014 DY_{32} | — | December 19, 2009 | Kitt Peak | Spacewatch | · | 1.2 km | MPC · JPL |
| 479624 | 2014 DJ_{34} | — | December 22, 2008 | Mount Lemmon | Mount Lemmon Survey | (18466) | 2.3 km | MPC · JPL |
| 479625 | 2014 DV_{34} | — | February 17, 2010 | Kitt Peak | Spacewatch | · | 1.1 km | MPC · JPL |
| 479626 | 2014 DX_{35} | — | February 27, 2006 | Kitt Peak | Spacewatch | · | 1.1 km | MPC · JPL |
| 479627 | 2014 DP_{36} | — | December 5, 2005 | Kitt Peak | Spacewatch | · | 960 m | MPC · JPL |
| 479628 | 2014 DH_{38} | — | March 13, 2005 | Catalina | CSS | · | 1.7 km | MPC · JPL |
| 479629 | 2014 DM_{39} | — | May 24, 2011 | Mount Lemmon | Mount Lemmon Survey | MAR | 1.1 km | MPC · JPL |
| 479630 | 2014 DO_{39} | — | September 10, 2007 | Mount Lemmon | Mount Lemmon Survey | · | 2.3 km | MPC · JPL |
| 479631 | 2014 DZ_{40} | — | December 6, 2008 | Kitt Peak | Spacewatch | · | 1.5 km | MPC · JPL |
| 479632 | 2014 DH_{41} | — | November 24, 2009 | Mount Lemmon | Mount Lemmon Survey | · | 730 m | MPC · JPL |
| 479633 | 2014 DM_{42} | — | May 1, 2006 | Kitt Peak | Spacewatch | · | 1.6 km | MPC · JPL |
| 479634 | 2014 DP_{43} | — | January 19, 2004 | Kitt Peak | Spacewatch | 615 | 1.3 km | MPC · JPL |
| 479635 | 2014 DT_{44} | — | April 2, 2006 | Kitt Peak | Spacewatch | · | 1.4 km | MPC · JPL |
| 479636 | 2014 DD_{45} | — | October 27, 2009 | Mount Lemmon | Mount Lemmon Survey | V | 700 m | MPC · JPL |
| 479637 | 2014 DF_{46} | — | February 24, 2009 | Mount Lemmon | Mount Lemmon Survey | · | 2.5 km | MPC · JPL |
| 479638 | 2014 DN_{46} | — | November 8, 2008 | Kitt Peak | Spacewatch | · | 1.2 km | MPC · JPL |
| 479639 | 2014 DA_{47} | — | November 18, 2001 | Kitt Peak | Spacewatch | NYS | 1.0 km | MPC · JPL |
| 479640 | 2014 DH_{47} | — | March 10, 2005 | Mount Lemmon | Mount Lemmon Survey | · | 1.7 km | MPC · JPL |
| 479641 | 2014 DT_{47} | — | October 15, 2007 | Mount Lemmon | Mount Lemmon Survey | · | 2.1 km | MPC · JPL |
| 479642 | 2014 DC_{48} | — | May 15, 2010 | WISE | WISE | · | 2.6 km | MPC · JPL |
| 479643 | 2014 DY_{49} | — | March 10, 2007 | Mount Lemmon | Mount Lemmon Survey | · | 900 m | MPC · JPL |
| 479644 | 2014 DN_{53} | — | September 17, 1995 | Kitt Peak | Spacewatch | ADE | 1.3 km | MPC · JPL |
| 479645 | 2014 DX_{53} | — | April 19, 2006 | Mount Lemmon | Mount Lemmon Survey | · | 930 m | MPC · JPL |
| 479646 | 2014 DM_{55} | — | September 30, 2011 | Kitt Peak | Spacewatch | · | 1.7 km | MPC · JPL |
| 479647 | 2014 DV_{57} | — | March 31, 2009 | Mount Lemmon | Mount Lemmon Survey | EOS | 1.7 km | MPC · JPL |
| 479648 | 2014 DW_{57} | — | November 13, 2012 | Mount Lemmon | Mount Lemmon Survey | HOF | 2.4 km | MPC · JPL |
| 479649 | 2014 DZ_{57} | — | November 11, 2012 | Catalina | CSS | · | 1.4 km | MPC · JPL |
| 479650 | 2014 DU_{59} | — | October 22, 2003 | Kitt Peak | Spacewatch | · | 1.7 km | MPC · JPL |
| 479651 | 2014 DC_{60} | — | November 10, 2004 | Kitt Peak | Spacewatch | · | 1.2 km | MPC · JPL |
| 479652 | 2014 DO_{60} | — | February 1, 2005 | Kitt Peak | Spacewatch | · | 1.6 km | MPC · JPL |
| 479653 | 2014 DB_{61} | — | April 8, 2003 | Kitt Peak | Spacewatch | · | 2.7 km | MPC · JPL |
| 479654 | 2014 DA_{62} | — | March 3, 2005 | Catalina | CSS | · | 2.4 km | MPC · JPL |
| 479655 | 2014 DZ_{62} | — | August 9, 2007 | Kitt Peak | Spacewatch | · | 1.6 km | MPC · JPL |
| 479656 | 2014 DJ_{63} | — | November 14, 2006 | Kitt Peak | Spacewatch | · | 2.9 km | MPC · JPL |
| 479657 | 2014 DM_{64} | — | March 18, 2010 | Kitt Peak | Spacewatch | · | 1 km | MPC · JPL |
| 479658 | 2014 DX_{66} | — | April 1, 2005 | Kitt Peak | Spacewatch | · | 1.6 km | MPC · JPL |
| 479659 | 2014 DY_{66} | — | November 19, 2003 | Kitt Peak | Spacewatch | WIT | 1.0 km | MPC · JPL |
| 479660 | 2014 DA_{67} | — | November 3, 2007 | Mount Lemmon | Mount Lemmon Survey | · | 1.8 km | MPC · JPL |
| 479661 | 2014 DM_{67} | — | September 26, 2012 | Mount Lemmon | Mount Lemmon Survey | (5) | 1.1 km | MPC · JPL |
| 479662 | 2014 DN_{68} | — | January 10, 2008 | Mount Lemmon | Mount Lemmon Survey | HYG | 2.7 km | MPC · JPL |
| 479663 | 2014 DZ_{68} | — | October 15, 2007 | Mount Lemmon | Mount Lemmon Survey | · | 2.0 km | MPC · JPL |
| 479664 | 2014 DW_{71} | — | December 6, 2012 | Mount Lemmon | Mount Lemmon Survey | · | 2.1 km | MPC · JPL |
| 479665 | 2014 DG_{73} | — | March 13, 2007 | Mount Lemmon | Mount Lemmon Survey | · | 900 m | MPC · JPL |
| 479666 | 2014 DQ_{75} | — | March 18, 2004 | Kitt Peak | Spacewatch | · | 2.4 km | MPC · JPL |
| 479667 | 2014 DV_{75} | — | January 8, 2010 | Mount Lemmon | Mount Lemmon Survey | · | 1.3 km | MPC · JPL |
| 479668 | 2014 DA_{77} | — | December 4, 2007 | Mount Lemmon | Mount Lemmon Survey | · | 3.2 km | MPC · JPL |
| 479669 | 2014 DP_{77} | — | September 19, 2007 | Kitt Peak | Spacewatch | · | 1.6 km | MPC · JPL |
| 479670 | 2014 DW_{78} | — | November 11, 2004 | Goodricke-Pigott | R. A. Tucker | · | 1.3 km | MPC · JPL |
| 479671 | 2014 DL_{79} | — | October 1, 2011 | Kitt Peak | Spacewatch | · | 3.2 km | MPC · JPL |
| 479672 | 2014 DW_{79} | — | April 20, 2009 | Mount Lemmon | Mount Lemmon Survey | · | 1.7 km | MPC · JPL |
| 479673 | 2014 DK_{81} | — | October 1, 2005 | Kitt Peak | Spacewatch | · | 920 m | MPC · JPL |
| 479674 | 2014 DD_{82} | — | September 10, 2007 | Mount Lemmon | Mount Lemmon Survey | AGN | 1.1 km | MPC · JPL |
| 479675 | 2014 DB_{83} | — | November 8, 2007 | Kitt Peak | Spacewatch | EOS | 1.8 km | MPC · JPL |
| 479676 | 2014 DJ_{83} | — | September 10, 2007 | Mount Lemmon | Mount Lemmon Survey | · | 1.5 km | MPC · JPL |
| 479677 | 2014 DK_{83} | — | February 10, 1996 | Kitt Peak | Spacewatch | · | 1.9 km | MPC · JPL |
| 479678 | 2014 DS_{83} | — | October 27, 2005 | Kitt Peak | Spacewatch | · | 960 m | MPC · JPL |
| 479679 | 2014 DA_{84} | — | March 18, 2010 | Mount Lemmon | Mount Lemmon Survey | · | 1.2 km | MPC · JPL |
| 479680 | 2014 DN_{85} | — | November 19, 2007 | Mount Lemmon | Mount Lemmon Survey | EOS | 2.0 km | MPC · JPL |
| 479681 | 2014 DV_{85} | — | October 25, 2008 | Kitt Peak | Spacewatch | · | 1.4 km | MPC · JPL |
| 479682 | 2014 DE_{87} | — | September 11, 2004 | Kitt Peak | Spacewatch | · | 810 m | MPC · JPL |
| 479683 | 2014 DX_{87} | — | March 14, 2010 | Kitt Peak | Spacewatch | · | 1.3 km | MPC · JPL |
| 479684 | 2014 DB_{90} | — | November 17, 2007 | Kitt Peak | Spacewatch | · | 2.2 km | MPC · JPL |
| 479685 | 2014 DM_{90} | — | September 26, 1995 | Kitt Peak | Spacewatch | · | 1.7 km | MPC · JPL |
| 479686 | 2014 DY_{90} | — | September 13, 2007 | Mount Lemmon | Mount Lemmon Survey | · | 1.8 km | MPC · JPL |
| 479687 | 2014 DJ_{91} | — | September 13, 2007 | Mount Lemmon | Mount Lemmon Survey | · | 1.9 km | MPC · JPL |
| 479688 | 2014 DT_{91} | — | June 19, 2006 | Mount Lemmon | Mount Lemmon Survey | AGN | 1.4 km | MPC · JPL |
| 479689 | 2014 DW_{93} | — | February 1, 2005 | Kitt Peak | Spacewatch | · | 1.7 km | MPC · JPL |
| 479690 | 2014 DE_{97} | — | February 24, 2006 | Kitt Peak | Spacewatch | · | 980 m | MPC · JPL |
| 479691 | 2014 DN_{103} | — | September 12, 2007 | Mount Lemmon | Mount Lemmon Survey | · | 1.9 km | MPC · JPL |
| 479692 | 2014 DK_{104} | — | January 11, 2010 | Kitt Peak | Spacewatch | NYS | 1.0 km | MPC · JPL |
| 479693 | 2014 DR_{104} | — | November 16, 2006 | Kitt Peak | Spacewatch | · | 2.4 km | MPC · JPL |
| 479694 | 2014 DW_{104} | — | March 3, 2009 | Mount Lemmon | Mount Lemmon Survey | EOS | 1.3 km | MPC · JPL |
| 479695 | 2014 DN_{109} | — | March 9, 2005 | Catalina | CSS | · | 1.7 km | MPC · JPL |
| 479696 | 2014 DS_{109} | — | September 10, 2007 | Kitt Peak | Spacewatch | · | 1.7 km | MPC · JPL |
| 479697 | 2014 DY_{111} | — | October 21, 2008 | Kitt Peak | Spacewatch | (29841) | 1.3 km | MPC · JPL |
| 479698 | 2014 DY_{113} | — | September 13, 2007 | Mount Lemmon | Mount Lemmon Survey | · | 1.5 km | MPC · JPL |
| 479699 | 2014 DA_{114} | — | October 10, 2007 | Mount Lemmon | Mount Lemmon Survey | · | 2.1 km | MPC · JPL |
| 479700 | 2014 DT_{114} | — | January 4, 2010 | Kitt Peak | Spacewatch | NYS | 1.1 km | MPC · JPL |

== 479701–479800 ==
back to top

| Designation | | | Discovery | | | Properties | | Ref |
| Permanent | Provisional | Named after | Date | Site | Discoverer(s) | Category | Diam. | Ref |
|---|---|---|---|---|---|---|---|---|
| 479701 | 2014 DB_{116} | — | February 2, 2008 | Kitt Peak | Spacewatch | · | 3.2 km | MPC · JPL |
| 479702 | 2014 DQ_{116} | — | September 5, 1999 | Kitt Peak | Spacewatch | MAR | 950 m | MPC · JPL |
| 479703 | 2014 DV_{116} | — | September 11, 2007 | Kitt Peak | Spacewatch | · | 1.4 km | MPC · JPL |
| 479704 | 2014 DB_{117} | — | March 31, 2009 | Kitt Peak | Spacewatch | · | 2.5 km | MPC · JPL |
| 479705 | 2014 DJ_{119} | — | March 3, 2005 | Catalina | CSS | · | 2.1 km | MPC · JPL |
| 479706 | 2014 DL_{119} | — | March 15, 2004 | Kitt Peak | Spacewatch | · | 1.9 km | MPC · JPL |
| 479707 | 2014 DR_{119} | — | April 2, 2005 | Kitt Peak | Spacewatch | AGN | 1.1 km | MPC · JPL |
| 479708 | 2014 DU_{119} | — | May 9, 2006 | Mount Lemmon | Mount Lemmon Survey | · | 1.6 km | MPC · JPL |
| 479709 | 2014 DN_{120} | — | July 29, 2008 | Mount Lemmon | Mount Lemmon Survey | V | 740 m | MPC · JPL |
| 479710 | 2014 DO_{120} | — | February 16, 2010 | WISE | WISE | · | 2.1 km | MPC · JPL |
| 479711 | 2014 DB_{125} | — | August 28, 2005 | Kitt Peak | Spacewatch | · | 4.8 km | MPC · JPL |
| 479712 | 2014 DZ_{125} | — | September 10, 2007 | Mount Lemmon | Mount Lemmon Survey | MAR | 1.2 km | MPC · JPL |
| 479713 | 2014 DW_{127} | — | October 26, 2012 | Mount Lemmon | Mount Lemmon Survey | · | 1.4 km | MPC · JPL |
| 479714 | 2014 DZ_{128} | — | November 1, 2007 | Mount Lemmon | Mount Lemmon Survey | AGN | 1.1 km | MPC · JPL |
| 479715 | 2014 DA_{129} | — | December 29, 2008 | Kitt Peak | Spacewatch | · | 1.4 km | MPC · JPL |
| 479716 | 2014 DH_{129} | — | October 21, 2007 | Kitt Peak | Spacewatch | · | 2.2 km | MPC · JPL |
| 479717 | 2014 DJ_{129} | — | February 19, 2009 | Kitt Peak | Spacewatch | · | 1.9 km | MPC · JPL |
| 479718 | 2014 DM_{130} | — | January 3, 2014 | Mount Lemmon | Mount Lemmon Survey | · | 2.7 km | MPC · JPL |
| 479719 | 2014 DS_{130} | — | October 12, 2007 | Kitt Peak | Spacewatch | · | 1.7 km | MPC · JPL |
| 479720 | 2014 DX_{131} | — | November 1, 2005 | Mount Lemmon | Mount Lemmon Survey | MAS | 660 m | MPC · JPL |
| 479721 | 2014 DM_{132} | — | October 2, 2006 | Mount Lemmon | Mount Lemmon Survey | · | 2.3 km | MPC · JPL |
| 479722 | 2014 DZ_{132} | — | September 12, 2007 | Mount Lemmon | Mount Lemmon Survey | · | 1.7 km | MPC · JPL |
| 479723 | 2014 DO_{133} | — | October 21, 2007 | Kitt Peak | Spacewatch | · | 2.0 km | MPC · JPL |
| 479724 | 2014 DA_{134} | — | October 1, 2005 | Mount Lemmon | Mount Lemmon Survey | · | 780 m | MPC · JPL |
| 479725 | 2014 DE_{134} | — | October 14, 2007 | Mount Lemmon | Mount Lemmon Survey | · | 1.8 km | MPC · JPL |
| 479726 | 2014 DE_{136} | — | October 16, 2007 | Mount Lemmon | Mount Lemmon Survey | KOR | 1.3 km | MPC · JPL |
| 479727 | 2014 DP_{136} | — | January 6, 2010 | Kitt Peak | Spacewatch | · | 1 km | MPC · JPL |
| 479728 | 2014 DR_{136} | — | March 19, 2010 | Mount Lemmon | Mount Lemmon Survey | · | 2.2 km | MPC · JPL |
| 479729 | 2014 DJ_{137} | — | February 1, 2009 | Kitt Peak | Spacewatch | · | 1.8 km | MPC · JPL |
| 479730 | 2014 DU_{137} | — | February 2, 2009 | Mount Lemmon | Mount Lemmon Survey | · | 1.6 km | MPC · JPL |
| 479731 | 2014 DA_{138} | — | October 8, 2007 | Mount Lemmon | Mount Lemmon Survey | · | 1.8 km | MPC · JPL |
| 479732 | 2014 DP_{138} | — | September 23, 2011 | Kitt Peak | Spacewatch | · | 3.1 km | MPC · JPL |
| 479733 | 2014 DM_{139} | — | March 8, 2005 | Mount Lemmon | Mount Lemmon Survey | · | 1.7 km | MPC · JPL |
| 479734 | 2014 DN_{140} | — | March 16, 2005 | Kitt Peak | Spacewatch | · | 1.9 km | MPC · JPL |
| 479735 | 2014 DV_{140} | — | March 25, 2010 | Mount Lemmon | Mount Lemmon Survey | · | 1.0 km | MPC · JPL |
| 479736 | 2014 DA_{142} | — | October 9, 2004 | Kitt Peak | Spacewatch | · | 1.0 km | MPC · JPL |
| 479737 | 2014 DD_{142} | — | December 16, 1995 | Kitt Peak | Spacewatch | · | 770 m | MPC · JPL |
| 479738 | 2014 EM_{2} | — | September 11, 2007 | Kitt Peak | Spacewatch | · | 1.8 km | MPC · JPL |
| 479739 | 2014 ET_{2} | — | October 21, 2008 | Lulin | LUSS | · | 1.1 km | MPC · JPL |
| 479740 | 2014 EG_{4} | — | September 14, 2006 | Kitt Peak | Spacewatch | · | 2.7 km | MPC · JPL |
| 479741 | 2014 EE_{5} | — | September 5, 2008 | Kitt Peak | Spacewatch | · | 1.0 km | MPC · JPL |
| 479742 | 2014 ER_{6} | — | April 19, 2009 | Kitt Peak | Spacewatch | · | 2.6 km | MPC · JPL |
| 479743 | 2014 EK_{8} | — | March 12, 2010 | WISE | WISE | · | 1.7 km | MPC · JPL |
| 479744 | 2014 EL_{9} | — | December 18, 2004 | Mount Lemmon | Mount Lemmon Survey | · | 1.5 km | MPC · JPL |
| 479745 | 2014 EZ_{9} | — | December 22, 2008 | Mount Lemmon | Mount Lemmon Survey | · | 2.1 km | MPC · JPL |
| 479746 | 2014 EQ_{10} | — | January 13, 2005 | Kitt Peak | Spacewatch | · | 1.5 km | MPC · JPL |
| 479747 | 2014 EA_{12} | — | March 31, 2003 | Kitt Peak | Spacewatch | · | 1.2 km | MPC · JPL |
| 479748 | 2014 EE_{12} | — | November 28, 2005 | Kitt Peak | Spacewatch | · | 1.1 km | MPC · JPL |
| 479749 | 2014 EZ_{12} | — | February 20, 2009 | Mount Lemmon | Mount Lemmon Survey | · | 1.8 km | MPC · JPL |
| 479750 | 2014 EA_{16} | — | October 23, 2003 | Kitt Peak | Spacewatch | · | 1.7 km | MPC · JPL |
| 479751 | 2014 EY_{16} | — | January 7, 2006 | Mount Lemmon | Mount Lemmon Survey | MAS | 630 m | MPC · JPL |
| 479752 | 2014 EO_{17} | — | November 10, 2009 | Kitt Peak | Spacewatch | ERI | 1.4 km | MPC · JPL |
| 479753 | 2014 EF_{18} | — | September 3, 2008 | Kitt Peak | Spacewatch | · | 1 km | MPC · JPL |
| 479754 | 2014 EG_{19} | — | October 11, 2007 | Mount Lemmon | Mount Lemmon Survey | · | 1.9 km | MPC · JPL |
| 479755 | 2014 ER_{20} | — | January 28, 2006 | Kitt Peak | Spacewatch | · | 1.5 km | MPC · JPL |
| 479756 | 2014 ED_{22} | — | January 10, 2014 | Mount Lemmon | Mount Lemmon Survey | · | 950 m | MPC · JPL |
| 479757 | 2014 EH_{22} | — | September 7, 2004 | Kitt Peak | Spacewatch | · | 940 m | MPC · JPL |
| 479758 | 2014 EU_{22} | — | August 28, 2006 | Kitt Peak | Spacewatch | KOR | 1.3 km | MPC · JPL |
| 479759 | 2014 EN_{23} | — | November 6, 2012 | Kitt Peak | Spacewatch | · | 1.8 km | MPC · JPL |
| 479760 | 2014 EF_{25} | — | November 23, 2012 | Kitt Peak | Spacewatch | · | 1.7 km | MPC · JPL |
| 479761 | 2014 EJ_{25} | — | October 6, 2008 | Mount Lemmon | Mount Lemmon Survey | · | 1.4 km | MPC · JPL |
| 479762 | 2014 EN_{25} | — | February 23, 2006 | Anderson Mesa | LONEOS | · | 1.4 km | MPC · JPL |
| 479763 | 2014 EG_{26} | — | January 7, 2009 | Kitt Peak | Spacewatch | · | 1.4 km | MPC · JPL |
| 479764 | 2014 EM_{26} | — | November 15, 1995 | Kitt Peak | Spacewatch | · | 1.4 km | MPC · JPL |
| 479765 | 2014 EP_{26} | — | February 27, 2009 | Kitt Peak | Spacewatch | KOR | 1.5 km | MPC · JPL |
| 479766 | 2014 EW_{26} | — | April 11, 2005 | Kitt Peak | Spacewatch | · | 1.8 km | MPC · JPL |
| 479767 | 2014 EX_{26} | — | October 5, 2004 | Kitt Peak | Spacewatch | (5) | 930 m | MPC · JPL |
| 479768 | 2014 EG_{28} | — | December 3, 2012 | Mount Lemmon | Mount Lemmon Survey | · | 1.9 km | MPC · JPL |
| 479769 | 2014 EL_{28} | — | September 19, 2003 | Kitt Peak | Spacewatch | · | 1.7 km | MPC · JPL |
| 479770 | 2014 EO_{29} | — | March 14, 2010 | Kitt Peak | Spacewatch | · | 1.6 km | MPC · JPL |
| 479771 | 2014 EF_{30} | — | October 2, 2008 | Mount Lemmon | Mount Lemmon Survey | · | 960 m | MPC · JPL |
| 479772 | 2014 EX_{30} | — | September 30, 2003 | Kitt Peak | Spacewatch | · | 1.9 km | MPC · JPL |
| 479773 | 2014 EK_{31} | — | February 2, 2009 | Kitt Peak | Spacewatch | · | 2.2 km | MPC · JPL |
| 479774 | 2014 EM_{32} | — | January 12, 2008 | Mount Lemmon | Mount Lemmon Survey | · | 3.1 km | MPC · JPL |
| 479775 | 2014 EP_{32} | — | March 4, 2005 | Mount Lemmon | Mount Lemmon Survey | · | 1.7 km | MPC · JPL |
| 479776 | 2014 EB_{33} | — | January 17, 2009 | Kitt Peak | Spacewatch | · | 2.2 km | MPC · JPL |
| 479777 | 2014 ES_{34} | — | April 9, 2010 | Mount Lemmon | Mount Lemmon Survey | · | 1.3 km | MPC · JPL |
| 479778 | 2014 EY_{34} | — | May 26, 2010 | WISE | WISE | · | 5.0 km | MPC · JPL |
| 479779 | 2014 EB_{36} | — | May 4, 2009 | Mount Lemmon | Mount Lemmon Survey | · | 3.7 km | MPC · JPL |
| 479780 | 2014 EN_{36} | — | January 16, 2005 | Kitt Peak | Spacewatch | · | 1.2 km | MPC · JPL |
| 479781 | 2014 ER_{38} | — | March 2, 2009 | Mount Lemmon | Mount Lemmon Survey | EOS | 1.9 km | MPC · JPL |
| 479782 | 2014 EV_{39} | — | December 30, 2007 | Kitt Peak | Spacewatch | EOS | 1.9 km | MPC · JPL |
| 479783 | 2014 EK_{44} | — | February 20, 2009 | Mount Lemmon | Mount Lemmon Survey | · | 2.6 km | MPC · JPL |
| 479784 | 2014 EP_{44} | — | February 22, 2010 | WISE | WISE | · | 3.6 km | MPC · JPL |
| 479785 | 2014 EE_{45} | — | December 7, 2012 | Mount Lemmon | Mount Lemmon Survey | · | 3.1 km | MPC · JPL |
| 479786 | 2014 EV_{45} | — | December 19, 2004 | Mount Lemmon | Mount Lemmon Survey | · | 1.4 km | MPC · JPL |
| 479787 | 2014 EM_{47} | — | November 18, 2001 | Kitt Peak | Spacewatch | · | 2.3 km | MPC · JPL |
| 479788 | 2014 EN_{48} | — | October 15, 2012 | Catalina | CSS | MAR | 1.2 km | MPC · JPL |
| 479789 | 2014 EO_{48} | — | September 20, 2003 | Campo Imperatore | CINEOS | · | 2.4 km | MPC · JPL |
| 479790 | 2014 ET_{49} | — | December 3, 2007 | Kitt Peak | Spacewatch | · | 3.2 km | MPC · JPL |
| 479791 | 2014 ES_{50} | — | February 7, 2010 | WISE | WISE | · | 2.2 km | MPC · JPL |
| 479792 | 2014 EB_{51} | — | October 30, 2005 | Mount Lemmon | Mount Lemmon Survey | NYS | 1.2 km | MPC · JPL |
| 479793 | 2014 FD_{1} | — | September 30, 2006 | Mount Lemmon | Mount Lemmon Survey | · | 2.1 km | MPC · JPL |
| 479794 | 2014 FS_{5} | — | January 31, 2009 | Kitt Peak | Spacewatch | AGN | 1.1 km | MPC · JPL |
| 479795 | 2014 FW_{5} | — | March 2, 2009 | Mount Lemmon | Mount Lemmon Survey | · | 3.5 km | MPC · JPL |
| 479796 | 2014 FH_{6} | — | March 18, 2009 | Kitt Peak | Spacewatch | · | 2.7 km | MPC · JPL |
| 479797 | 2014 FF_{8} | — | March 31, 2009 | Mount Lemmon | Mount Lemmon Survey | · | 2.4 km | MPC · JPL |
| 479798 | 2014 FW_{8} | — | November 18, 2003 | Kitt Peak | Spacewatch | WIT | 1.1 km | MPC · JPL |
| 479799 | 2014 FK_{15} | — | March 16, 2005 | Mount Lemmon | Mount Lemmon Survey | · | 1.7 km | MPC · JPL |
| 479800 | 2014 FP_{16} | — | April 9, 2005 | Mount Lemmon | Mount Lemmon Survey | · | 1.6 km | MPC · JPL |

== 479801–479900 ==
back to top

| Designation | | | Discovery | | | Properties | | Ref |
| Permanent | Provisional | Named after | Date | Site | Discoverer(s) | Category | Diam. | Ref |
|---|---|---|---|---|---|---|---|---|
| 479801 | 2014 FB_{20} | — | February 26, 2003 | Campo Imperatore | CINEOS | · | 4.4 km | MPC · JPL |
| 479802 | 2014 FD_{27} | — | March 19, 2009 | Mount Lemmon | Mount Lemmon Survey | · | 2.3 km | MPC · JPL |
| 479803 | 2014 FU_{27} | — | October 28, 1994 | Kitt Peak | Spacewatch | · | 1.6 km | MPC · JPL |
| 479804 | 2014 FD_{28} | — | October 12, 2006 | Kitt Peak | Spacewatch | · | 2.0 km | MPC · JPL |
| 479805 | 2014 FN_{28} | — | October 26, 2012 | Mount Lemmon | Mount Lemmon Survey | · | 1.9 km | MPC · JPL |
| 479806 | 2014 FC_{30} | — | September 17, 2006 | Kitt Peak | Spacewatch | · | 1.8 km | MPC · JPL |
| 479807 | 2014 FQ_{30} | — | March 19, 2007 | Mount Lemmon | Mount Lemmon Survey | · | 910 m | MPC · JPL |
| 479808 | 2014 FL_{31} | — | January 24, 2010 | WISE | WISE | ADE | 3.3 km | MPC · JPL |
| 479809 | 2014 FG_{34} | — | August 30, 2005 | Kitt Peak | Spacewatch | · | 2.3 km | MPC · JPL |
| 479810 | 2014 FK_{35} | — | May 4, 2010 | WISE | WISE | · | 5.4 km | MPC · JPL |
| 479811 | 2014 FW_{35} | — | October 22, 2006 | Mount Lemmon | Mount Lemmon Survey | · | 3.0 km | MPC · JPL |
| 479812 | 2014 FY_{35} | — | March 29, 2009 | Catalina | CSS | · | 2.3 km | MPC · JPL |
| 479813 | 2014 FB_{36} | — | March 16, 2010 | Mount Lemmon | Mount Lemmon Survey | (5) | 1.0 km | MPC · JPL |
| 479814 | 2014 FD_{36} | — | February 20, 2009 | Kitt Peak | Spacewatch | · | 2.1 km | MPC · JPL |
| 479815 | 2014 FN_{36} | — | October 19, 2012 | Mount Lemmon | Mount Lemmon Survey | JUN | 940 m | MPC · JPL |
| 479816 | 2014 FD_{39} | — | April 11, 2005 | Kitt Peak | Spacewatch | · | 1.6 km | MPC · JPL |
| 479817 | 2014 FN_{46} | — | October 22, 2006 | Kitt Peak | Spacewatch | · | 2.9 km | MPC · JPL |
| 479818 | 2014 FJ_{51} | — | January 1, 2009 | Mount Lemmon | Mount Lemmon Survey | EUN | 1.4 km | MPC · JPL |
| 479819 | 2014 FS_{51} | — | November 13, 2012 | Kitt Peak | Spacewatch | · | 1.7 km | MPC · JPL |
| 479820 | 2014 FP_{53} | — | October 2, 2006 | Mount Lemmon | Mount Lemmon Survey | · | 2.2 km | MPC · JPL |
| 479821 | 2014 FL_{57} | — | December 21, 2008 | Mount Lemmon | Mount Lemmon Survey | · | 1.8 km | MPC · JPL |
| 479822 | 2014 FA_{58} | — | September 11, 2007 | Mount Lemmon | Mount Lemmon Survey | · | 1.4 km | MPC · JPL |
| 479823 | 2014 FR_{62} | — | December 1, 2008 | Mount Lemmon | Mount Lemmon Survey | · | 3.1 km | MPC · JPL |
| 479824 | 2014 FZ_{62} | — | September 4, 2008 | Kitt Peak | Spacewatch | · | 1.4 km | MPC · JPL |
| 479825 | 2014 FF_{63} | — | February 2, 2008 | Catalina | CSS | · | 3.8 km | MPC · JPL |
| 479826 | 2014 FE_{64} | — | September 19, 2006 | Catalina | CSS | · | 1.9 km | MPC · JPL |
| 479827 | 2014 FG_{64} | — | October 30, 2008 | Kitt Peak | Spacewatch | · | 1.3 km | MPC · JPL |
| 479828 | 2014 FR_{64} | — | March 15, 2010 | Kitt Peak | Spacewatch | · | 1.3 km | MPC · JPL |
| 479829 | 2014 FV_{64} | — | January 10, 2013 | Mount Lemmon | Mount Lemmon Survey | NAE | 2.9 km | MPC · JPL |
| 479830 | 2014 FY_{64} | — | June 28, 2010 | WISE | WISE | LIX | 3.6 km | MPC · JPL |
| 479831 | 2014 FQ_{65} | — | March 9, 2005 | Mount Lemmon | Mount Lemmon Survey | · | 1.8 km | MPC · JPL |
| 479832 | 2014 FC_{66} | — | September 7, 2008 | Mount Lemmon | Mount Lemmon Survey | (1547) | 1.6 km | MPC · JPL |
| 479833 | 2014 FM_{66} | — | November 26, 2003 | Kitt Peak | Spacewatch | · | 2.0 km | MPC · JPL |
| 479834 | 2014 FU_{66} | — | January 9, 2008 | Mount Lemmon | Mount Lemmon Survey | T_{j} (2.99) | 3.5 km | MPC · JPL |
| 479835 | 2014 FW_{67} | — | April 2, 2009 | Mount Lemmon | Mount Lemmon Survey | · | 2.5 km | MPC · JPL |
| 479836 | 2014 GD_{1} | — | November 4, 1999 | Kitt Peak | Spacewatch | · | 1.7 km | MPC · JPL |
| 479837 | 2014 GL_{3} | — | October 10, 2007 | Kitt Peak | Spacewatch | · | 1.7 km | MPC · JPL |
| 479838 | 2014 GR_{3} | — | March 19, 2009 | Mount Lemmon | Mount Lemmon Survey | · | 2.6 km | MPC · JPL |
| 479839 | 2014 GL_{4} | — | January 1, 2008 | Kitt Peak | Spacewatch | · | 2.3 km | MPC · JPL |
| 479840 | 2014 GF_{5} | — | September 26, 2011 | Mount Lemmon | Mount Lemmon Survey | · | 1.6 km | MPC · JPL |
| 479841 | 2014 GL_{8} | — | October 12, 2005 | Kitt Peak | Spacewatch | MAS | 680 m | MPC · JPL |
| 479842 | 2014 GM_{11} | — | January 20, 2009 | Mount Lemmon | Mount Lemmon Survey | · | 1.9 km | MPC · JPL |
| 479843 | 2014 GY_{12} | — | September 20, 2003 | Kitt Peak | Spacewatch | · | 2.0 km | MPC · JPL |
| 479844 | 2014 GE_{15} | — | September 29, 2011 | Kitt Peak | Spacewatch | · | 3.1 km | MPC · JPL |
| 479845 | 2014 GH_{18} | — | October 13, 2005 | Kitt Peak | Spacewatch | · | 3.8 km | MPC · JPL |
| 479846 | 2014 GS_{18} | — | November 21, 2008 | Mount Lemmon | Mount Lemmon Survey | (5) | 1.1 km | MPC · JPL |
| 479847 | 2014 GT_{18} | — | March 22, 2009 | Catalina | CSS | · | 2.5 km | MPC · JPL |
| 479848 | 2014 GV_{18} | — | May 28, 2006 | Kitt Peak | Spacewatch | · | 3.3 km | MPC · JPL |
| 479849 | 2014 GD_{21} | — | January 29, 2009 | Mount Lemmon | Mount Lemmon Survey | · | 2.0 km | MPC · JPL |
| 479850 | 2014 GZ_{22} | — | March 29, 2004 | Kitt Peak | Spacewatch | · | 2.7 km | MPC · JPL |
| 479851 | 2014 GA_{26} | — | December 22, 2008 | Mount Lemmon | Mount Lemmon Survey | · | 1.8 km | MPC · JPL |
| 479852 | 2014 GR_{26} | — | September 9, 2007 | Mount Lemmon | Mount Lemmon Survey | · | 1.6 km | MPC · JPL |
| 479853 | 2014 GQ_{27} | — | May 16, 2005 | Mount Lemmon | Mount Lemmon Survey | DOR | 2.1 km | MPC · JPL |
| 479854 | 2014 GV_{27} | — | April 5, 2008 | Kitt Peak | Spacewatch | · | 3.4 km | MPC · JPL |
| 479855 | 2014 GG_{28} | — | October 11, 2005 | Kitt Peak | Spacewatch | EOS | 1.7 km | MPC · JPL |
| 479856 | 2014 GD_{29} | — | September 15, 2006 | Kitt Peak | Spacewatch | HOF | 2.3 km | MPC · JPL |
| 479857 | 2014 GX_{30} | — | February 18, 2008 | Mount Lemmon | Mount Lemmon Survey | EOS | 1.8 km | MPC · JPL |
| 479858 | 2014 GT_{31} | — | April 21, 1993 | Kitt Peak | Spacewatch | EUN | 1.1 km | MPC · JPL |
| 479859 | 2014 GW_{31} | — | December 3, 2012 | Catalina | CSS | EUN | 1.3 km | MPC · JPL |
| 479860 | 2014 GB_{32} | — | December 30, 2008 | Catalina | CSS | · | 1.9 km | MPC · JPL |
| 479861 | 2014 GC_{32} | — | February 17, 2010 | Kitt Peak | Spacewatch | · | 1.6 km | MPC · JPL |
| 479862 | 2014 GA_{36} | — | November 18, 2007 | Mount Lemmon | Mount Lemmon Survey | AGN | 1.4 km | MPC · JPL |
| 479863 | 2014 GE_{36} | — | February 28, 2009 | Kitt Peak | Spacewatch | AGN | 1.3 km | MPC · JPL |
| 479864 | 2014 GC_{37} | — | April 8, 2010 | Kitt Peak | Spacewatch | · | 1.8 km | MPC · JPL |
| 479865 | 2014 GM_{38} | — | April 19, 2009 | Kitt Peak | Spacewatch | · | 3.7 km | MPC · JPL |
| 479866 | 2014 GY_{38} | — | September 1, 2010 | Mount Lemmon | Mount Lemmon Survey | · | 2.7 km | MPC · JPL |
| 479867 | 2014 GJ_{39} | — | January 16, 2004 | Kitt Peak | Spacewatch | · | 2.3 km | MPC · JPL |
| 479868 | 2014 GS_{39} | — | May 4, 2009 | Mount Lemmon | Mount Lemmon Survey | · | 3.1 km | MPC · JPL |
| 479869 | 2014 GF_{40} | — | October 16, 2012 | Mount Lemmon | Mount Lemmon Survey | · | 1.0 km | MPC · JPL |
| 479870 | 2014 GG_{40} | — | November 17, 2011 | Mount Lemmon | Mount Lemmon Survey | · | 2.6 km | MPC · JPL |
| 479871 | 2014 GV_{40} | — | December 31, 2007 | Kitt Peak | Spacewatch | · | 2.0 km | MPC · JPL |
| 479872 | 2014 GQ_{41} | — | September 29, 2005 | Kitt Peak | Spacewatch | · | 2.7 km | MPC · JPL |
| 479873 | 2014 GR_{44} | — | November 20, 2003 | Socorro | LINEAR | · | 2.4 km | MPC · JPL |
| 479874 | 2014 GR_{46} | — | November 18, 2003 | Kitt Peak | Spacewatch | · | 1.6 km | MPC · JPL |
| 479875 | 2014 GX_{46} | — | February 19, 2001 | Anderson Mesa | LONEOS | · | 1.3 km | MPC · JPL |
| 479876 | 2014 GD_{51} | — | March 27, 2009 | Catalina | CSS | BRA | 1.6 km | MPC · JPL |
| 479877 | 2014 HK_{1} | — | November 5, 2005 | Anderson Mesa | LONEOS | · | 4.6 km | MPC · JPL |
| 479878 | 2014 HX_{3} | — | April 16, 2005 | Kitt Peak | Spacewatch | · | 1.7 km | MPC · JPL |
| 479879 | 2014 HE_{6} | — | March 11, 2003 | Kitt Peak | Spacewatch | · | 3.4 km | MPC · JPL |
| 479880 | 2014 HF_{6} | — | October 28, 2006 | Mount Lemmon | Mount Lemmon Survey | · | 2.3 km | MPC · JPL |
| 479881 | 2014 HO_{6} | — | June 21, 2010 | WISE | WISE | · | 3.1 km | MPC · JPL |
| 479882 | 2014 HL_{7} | — | March 8, 2005 | Kitt Peak | Spacewatch | JUN | 900 m | MPC · JPL |
| 479883 | 2014 HM_{8} | — | October 1, 1995 | Kitt Peak | Spacewatch | · | 2.4 km | MPC · JPL |
| 479884 | 2014 HO_{9} | — | February 9, 2008 | Kitt Peak | Spacewatch | · | 2.2 km | MPC · JPL |
| 479885 | 2014 HX_{9} | — | April 21, 2009 | Kitt Peak | Spacewatch | · | 2.4 km | MPC · JPL |
| 479886 | 2014 HC_{12} | — | November 3, 2011 | Kitt Peak | Spacewatch | · | 2.0 km | MPC · JPL |
| 479887 | 2014 HA_{16} | — | April 20, 2004 | Kitt Peak | Spacewatch | · | 1.6 km | MPC · JPL |
| 479888 | 2014 HP_{16} | — | February 2, 2009 | Mount Lemmon | Mount Lemmon Survey | · | 1.4 km | MPC · JPL |
| 479889 | 2014 HM_{19} | — | February 13, 2008 | Mount Lemmon | Mount Lemmon Survey | · | 2.6 km | MPC · JPL |
| 479890 | 2014 HK_{22} | — | March 3, 2008 | XuYi | PMO NEO Survey Program | · | 3.2 km | MPC · JPL |
| 479891 | 2014 HL_{24} | — | April 1, 2005 | Kitt Peak | Spacewatch | · | 1.8 km | MPC · JPL |
| 479892 | 2014 HP_{25} | — | November 1, 2007 | Mount Lemmon | Mount Lemmon Survey | · | 1.4 km | MPC · JPL |
| 479893 | 2014 HS_{25} | — | October 1, 2011 | Kitt Peak | Spacewatch | · | 2.1 km | MPC · JPL |
| 479894 | 2014 HH_{26} | — | November 1, 2005 | Kitt Peak | Spacewatch | · | 3.1 km | MPC · JPL |
| 479895 | 2014 HM_{26} | — | January 27, 2006 | Catalina | CSS | PHO | 1.1 km | MPC · JPL |
| 479896 | 2014 HY_{26} | — | May 15, 2009 | Kitt Peak | Spacewatch | · | 2.6 km | MPC · JPL |
| 479897 | 2014 HY_{27} | — | November 2, 2008 | Mount Lemmon | Mount Lemmon Survey | · | 2.3 km | MPC · JPL |
| 479898 | 2014 HC_{33} | — | June 28, 2010 | WISE | WISE | · | 2.8 km | MPC · JPL |
| 479899 | 2014 HS_{34} | — | March 21, 2009 | Catalina | CSS | NEM | 2.4 km | MPC · JPL |
| 479900 | 2014 HQ_{36} | — | September 10, 2004 | Kitt Peak | Spacewatch | · | 3.0 km | MPC · JPL |

== 479901–480000 ==
back to top

| Designation | | | Discovery | | | Properties | | Ref |
| Permanent | Provisional | Named after | Date | Site | Discoverer(s) | Category | Diam. | Ref |
|---|---|---|---|---|---|---|---|---|
| 479901 | 2014 HT_{37} | — | January 15, 2008 | Mount Lemmon | Mount Lemmon Survey | · | 1.8 km | MPC · JPL |
| 479902 | 2014 HK_{40} | — | April 22, 2009 | Mount Lemmon | Mount Lemmon Survey | · | 2.7 km | MPC · JPL |
| 479903 | 2014 HR_{40} | — | September 24, 2000 | Kitt Peak | Spacewatch | EOS | 1.5 km | MPC · JPL |
| 479904 | 2014 HW_{42} | — | November 8, 2007 | Kitt Peak | Spacewatch | · | 1.9 km | MPC · JPL |
| 479905 | 2014 HF_{43} | — | October 20, 1995 | Kitt Peak | Spacewatch | MAR | 1.1 km | MPC · JPL |
| 479906 | 2014 HB_{44} | — | October 10, 2007 | Mount Lemmon | Mount Lemmon Survey | · | 1.7 km | MPC · JPL |
| 479907 | 2014 HV_{44} | — | December 31, 2007 | Mount Lemmon | Mount Lemmon Survey | · | 1.7 km | MPC · JPL |
| 479908 | 2014 HC_{45} | — | April 10, 2005 | Kitt Peak | Spacewatch | · | 1.9 km | MPC · JPL |
| 479909 | 2014 HN_{45} | — | November 4, 2005 | Mount Lemmon | Mount Lemmon Survey | VER | 4.8 km | MPC · JPL |
| 479910 | 2014 HF_{46} | — | October 27, 2005 | Kitt Peak | Spacewatch | · | 2.9 km | MPC · JPL |
| 479911 | 2014 HE_{47} | — | March 19, 2009 | Mount Lemmon | Mount Lemmon Survey | · | 1.9 km | MPC · JPL |
| 479912 | 2014 HF_{47} | — | March 23, 2006 | Kitt Peak | Spacewatch | 3:2 | 6.0 km | MPC · JPL |
| 479913 | 2014 HJ_{47} | — | October 20, 2011 | Mount Lemmon | Mount Lemmon Survey | AGN | 1 km | MPC · JPL |
| 479914 | 2014 HO_{49} | — | October 7, 2007 | Mount Lemmon | Mount Lemmon Survey | · | 1.5 km | MPC · JPL |
| 479915 | 2014 HF_{50} | — | January 15, 2013 | Catalina | CSS | · | 2.3 km | MPC · JPL |
| 479916 | 2014 HD_{52} | — | October 25, 2011 | Haleakala | Pan-STARRS 1 | · | 3.3 km | MPC · JPL |
| 479917 | 2014 HN_{52} | — | March 10, 2008 | Kitt Peak | Spacewatch | · | 2.9 km | MPC · JPL |
| 479918 | 2014 HY_{55} | — | April 8, 2010 | Kitt Peak | Spacewatch | · | 1.2 km | MPC · JPL |
| 479919 | 2014 HH_{68} | — | October 20, 2011 | Mount Lemmon | Mount Lemmon Survey | · | 2.9 km | MPC · JPL |
| 479920 | 2014 HO_{77} | — | November 8, 2007 | Mount Lemmon | Mount Lemmon Survey | · | 1.8 km | MPC · JPL |
| 479921 | 2014 HQ_{96} | — | March 6, 2008 | Mount Lemmon | Mount Lemmon Survey | · | 3.2 km | MPC · JPL |
| 479922 | 2014 HV_{97} | — | March 5, 2008 | Mount Lemmon | Mount Lemmon Survey | EOS | 1.5 km | MPC · JPL |
| 479923 | 2014 HH_{100} | — | March 31, 2008 | Mount Lemmon | Mount Lemmon Survey | · | 4.4 km | MPC · JPL |
| 479924 | 2014 HJ_{110} | — | July 29, 2008 | Kitt Peak | Spacewatch | 3:2 · (3561) | 4.6 km | MPC · JPL |
| 479925 | 2014 HW_{121} | — | November 2, 2007 | Mount Lemmon | Mount Lemmon Survey | · | 1.5 km | MPC · JPL |
| 479926 | 2014 HG_{122} | — | August 22, 2004 | Kitt Peak | Spacewatch | · | 3.4 km | MPC · JPL |
| 479927 | 2014 HX_{122} | — | December 31, 2007 | Mount Lemmon | Mount Lemmon Survey | · | 1.7 km | MPC · JPL |
| 479928 | 2014 HZ_{125} | — | November 17, 2007 | Kitt Peak | Spacewatch | HOF | 2.1 km | MPC · JPL |
| 479929 | 2014 HR_{126} | — | October 16, 2006 | Kitt Peak | Spacewatch | · | 1.4 km | MPC · JPL |
| 479930 | 2014 HE_{128} | — | October 23, 2011 | Kitt Peak | Spacewatch | · | 3.5 km | MPC · JPL |
| 479931 | 2014 HL_{128} | — | September 14, 2005 | Catalina | CSS | · | 2.4 km | MPC · JPL |
| 479932 | 2014 HO_{130} | — | December 4, 2012 | Mount Lemmon | Mount Lemmon Survey | · | 2.3 km | MPC · JPL |
| 479933 | 2014 HP_{130} | — | October 9, 2012 | Mount Lemmon | Mount Lemmon Survey | · | 1.4 km | MPC · JPL |
| 479934 | 2014 HF_{136} | — | February 3, 2001 | Kitt Peak | Spacewatch | · | 1.1 km | MPC · JPL |
| 479935 | 2014 HL_{141} | — | March 3, 2009 | Kitt Peak | Spacewatch | · | 2.1 km | MPC · JPL |
| 479936 | 2014 HU_{141} | — | December 15, 2007 | Kitt Peak | Spacewatch | AGN | 1.0 km | MPC · JPL |
| 479937 | 2014 HH_{142} | — | November 9, 2007 | Kitt Peak | Spacewatch | AGN | 950 m | MPC · JPL |
| 479938 | 2014 HT_{145} | — | October 14, 2007 | Mount Lemmon | Mount Lemmon Survey | · | 2.2 km | MPC · JPL |
| 479939 | 2014 HN_{150} | — | September 18, 2006 | Anderson Mesa | LONEOS | KOR | 1.8 km | MPC · JPL |
| 479940 | 2014 HQ_{150} | — | December 5, 2007 | Kitt Peak | Spacewatch | KOR | 1.4 km | MPC · JPL |
| 479941 | 2014 HV_{150} | — | October 27, 2005 | Kitt Peak | Spacewatch | VER | 2.4 km | MPC · JPL |
| 479942 | 2014 HL_{153} | — | March 9, 2008 | Mount Lemmon | Mount Lemmon Survey | EOS | 1.4 km | MPC · JPL |
| 479943 | 2014 HL_{155} | — | September 29, 2011 | Kitt Peak | Spacewatch | · | 2.6 km | MPC · JPL |
| 479944 | 2014 HZ_{155} | — | October 30, 2011 | Kitt Peak | Spacewatch | VER | 2.3 km | MPC · JPL |
| 479945 | 2014 HU_{161} | — | February 4, 2009 | Catalina | CSS | EUN | 1.3 km | MPC · JPL |
| 479946 | 2014 HQ_{163} | — | October 8, 2012 | Mount Lemmon | Mount Lemmon Survey | · | 1.5 km | MPC · JPL |
| 479947 | 2014 HV_{167} | — | June 10, 2010 | WISE | WISE | · | 3.8 km | MPC · JPL |
| 479948 | 2014 HF_{169} | — | October 21, 2011 | Mount Lemmon | Mount Lemmon Survey | · | 2.9 km | MPC · JPL |
| 479949 | 2014 HD_{172} | — | October 20, 2011 | Mount Lemmon | Mount Lemmon Survey | · | 1.8 km | MPC · JPL |
| 479950 | 2014 HL_{176} | — | November 7, 2007 | Kitt Peak | Spacewatch | · | 1.7 km | MPC · JPL |
| 479951 | 2014 HW_{178} | — | September 18, 2003 | Kitt Peak | Spacewatch | EUN | 1.0 km | MPC · JPL |
| 479952 | 2014 HH_{181} | — | February 20, 2009 | Mount Lemmon | Mount Lemmon Survey | · | 1.7 km | MPC · JPL |
| 479953 | 2014 HX_{181} | — | February 2, 2009 | Mount Lemmon | Mount Lemmon Survey | · | 1.6 km | MPC · JPL |
| 479954 | 2014 HG_{182} | — | October 2, 2006 | Mount Lemmon | Mount Lemmon Survey | · | 2.4 km | MPC · JPL |
| 479955 | 2014 HP_{182} | — | October 19, 2007 | Catalina | CSS | · | 2.4 km | MPC · JPL |
| 479956 | 2014 HP_{185} | — | May 21, 2010 | WISE | WISE | · | 2.7 km | MPC · JPL |
| 479957 | 2014 HP_{188} | — | November 22, 2005 | Kitt Peak | Spacewatch | T_{j} (2.98) | 4.1 km | MPC · JPL |
| 479958 | 2014 HA_{195} | — | October 31, 2005 | Mount Lemmon | Mount Lemmon Survey | · | 4.0 km | MPC · JPL |
| 479959 | 2014 JC_{4} | — | September 14, 2010 | Mount Lemmon | Mount Lemmon Survey | · | 2.9 km | MPC · JPL |
| 479960 | 2014 JA_{8} | — | November 18, 2011 | Kitt Peak | Spacewatch | · | 2.9 km | MPC · JPL |
| 479961 | 2014 JM_{10} | — | November 1, 2011 | Mount Lemmon | Mount Lemmon Survey | · | 2.8 km | MPC · JPL |
| 479962 | 2014 JS_{10} | — | June 10, 2010 | WISE | WISE | EOS | 2.8 km | MPC · JPL |
| 479963 | 2014 JN_{11} | — | November 16, 2006 | Mount Lemmon | Mount Lemmon Survey | · | 1.9 km | MPC · JPL |
| 479964 | 2014 JU_{11} | — | January 30, 2009 | Catalina | CSS | · | 1.3 km | MPC · JPL |
| 479965 | 2014 JJ_{17} | — | April 8, 2003 | Kitt Peak | Spacewatch | · | 4.1 km | MPC · JPL |
| 479966 | 2014 JO_{27} | — | December 1, 2006 | Mount Lemmon | Mount Lemmon Survey | · | 4.6 km | MPC · JPL |
| 479967 | 2014 JM_{31} | — | April 2, 2009 | Mount Lemmon | Mount Lemmon Survey | BRA | 1.5 km | MPC · JPL |
| 479968 | 2014 JZ_{35} | — | November 4, 2005 | Kitt Peak | Spacewatch | · | 3.1 km | MPC · JPL |
| 479969 | 2014 JF_{36} | — | April 24, 2000 | Kitt Peak | Spacewatch | · | 2.2 km | MPC · JPL |
| 479970 | 2014 JN_{36} | — | January 17, 2013 | Mount Lemmon | Mount Lemmon Survey | · | 2.7 km | MPC · JPL |
| 479971 | 2014 JT_{37} | — | May 17, 2009 | Mount Lemmon | Mount Lemmon Survey | EOS | 1.5 km | MPC · JPL |
| 479972 | 2014 JB_{38} | — | April 28, 2008 | Kitt Peak | Spacewatch | · | 3.0 km | MPC · JPL |
| 479973 | 2014 JJ_{39} | — | June 15, 2010 | Mount Lemmon | Mount Lemmon Survey | · | 1.6 km | MPC · JPL |
| 479974 | 2014 JV_{42} | — | April 1, 2008 | Kitt Peak | Spacewatch | ELF | 3.1 km | MPC · JPL |
| 479975 | 2014 JM_{43} | — | April 10, 2008 | Catalina | CSS | · | 4.3 km | MPC · JPL |
| 479976 | 2014 JL_{45} | — | April 19, 2009 | Mount Lemmon | Mount Lemmon Survey | · | 1.8 km | MPC · JPL |
| 479977 | 2014 JS_{45} | — | February 12, 2008 | Mount Lemmon | Mount Lemmon Survey | HYG | 2.3 km | MPC · JPL |
| 479978 | 2014 JB_{47} | — | September 30, 2005 | Mount Lemmon | Mount Lemmon Survey | · | 3.2 km | MPC · JPL |
| 479979 | 2014 JB_{53} | — | June 25, 2010 | WISE | WISE | · | 4.2 km | MPC · JPL |
| 479980 | 2014 JE_{58} | — | February 9, 2008 | Mount Lemmon | Mount Lemmon Survey | · | 2.2 km | MPC · JPL |
| 479981 | 2014 JJ_{59} | — | May 3, 2014 | Mount Lemmon | Mount Lemmon Survey | · | 2.9 km | MPC · JPL |
| 479982 | 2014 JZ_{63} | — | November 2, 2011 | Kitt Peak | Spacewatch | EOS | 1.6 km | MPC · JPL |
| 479983 | 2014 JJ_{64} | — | December 4, 2012 | Mount Lemmon | Mount Lemmon Survey | EUN | 1.3 km | MPC · JPL |
| 479984 | 2014 JK_{65} | — | February 14, 2004 | Kitt Peak | Spacewatch | · | 2.0 km | MPC · JPL |
| 479985 | 2014 JD_{72} | — | September 15, 2007 | Mount Lemmon | Mount Lemmon Survey | · | 2.1 km | MPC · JPL |
| 479986 | 2014 JV_{77} | — | December 11, 2012 | Mount Lemmon | Mount Lemmon Survey | ADE | 2.2 km | MPC · JPL |
| 479987 | 2014 JE_{79} | — | March 29, 2008 | Catalina | CSS | · | 4.1 km | MPC · JPL |
| 479988 | 2014 KH_{1} | — | November 4, 2007 | Mount Lemmon | Mount Lemmon Survey | · | 2.7 km | MPC · JPL |
| 479989 | 2014 KT_{8} | — | October 27, 2012 | Mount Lemmon | Mount Lemmon Survey | · | 1.0 km | MPC · JPL |
| 479990 | 2014 KT_{18} | — | May 1, 2000 | Kitt Peak | Spacewatch | MRX | 1.1 km | MPC · JPL |
| 479991 | 2014 KQ_{22} | — | October 13, 2006 | Kitt Peak | Spacewatch | EOS | 1.8 km | MPC · JPL |
| 479992 | 2014 KT_{22} | — | January 17, 2009 | Kitt Peak | Spacewatch | · | 1.9 km | MPC · JPL |
| 479993 | 2014 KN_{23} | — | October 10, 2007 | Mount Lemmon | Mount Lemmon Survey | · | 2.0 km | MPC · JPL |
| 479994 | 2014 KW_{30} | — | October 1, 2010 | Mount Lemmon | Mount Lemmon Survey | · | 2.2 km | MPC · JPL |
| 479995 | 2014 KB_{41} | — | October 27, 2005 | Mount Lemmon | Mount Lemmon Survey | · | 3.1 km | MPC · JPL |
| 479996 | 2014 KD_{42} | — | November 19, 2006 | Kitt Peak | Spacewatch | EOS | 2.1 km | MPC · JPL |
| 479997 | 2014 KT_{62} | — | October 11, 2005 | Kitt Peak | Spacewatch | · | 2.3 km | MPC · JPL |
| 479998 | 2014 KA_{63} | — | October 16, 2007 | Mount Lemmon | Mount Lemmon Survey | DOR | 2.6 km | MPC · JPL |
| 479999 | 2014 KH_{64} | — | December 5, 2005 | Mount Lemmon | Mount Lemmon Survey | · | 3.4 km | MPC · JPL |
| 480000 | 2014 KR_{65} | — | March 5, 2013 | Catalina | CSS | EOS | 2.3 km | MPC · JPL |

back to top

== Meaning of names ==
As minor planet discoveries are confirmed, they are given a permanent number by the IAU's Minor Planet Center (MPC), and the discoverers can then submit names for them, following the IAU's naming conventions. The list below concerns those minor planets in the specified number-range that have received names, and explains the meanings of those names.

Official naming citations of newly named small Solar System bodies are approved and published in a bulletin by IAU's Working Group for Small Bodies Nomenclature (WGSBN). Before May 2021, citations were published in MPC's Minor Planet Circulars for many decades. Recent citations can also be found on the JPL Small-Body Database (SBDB). Until his death in 2016, German astronomer Lutz D. Schmadel compiled these citations into the Dictionary of Minor Planet Names (DMP) and regularly updated the collection.

Based on Paul Herget's The Names of the Minor Planets, Schmadel also researched the unclear origin of numerous asteroids, most of which had been named prior to World War II. This article incorporates text from this source, which is in the public domain: SBDB New namings may only be added to this list below after official publication as the preannouncement of names is condemned. The WGSBN publishes a comprehensive guideline for the naming rules of non-cometary small Solar System bodies.

| Named minor planet | Provisional | This minor planet was named for... | Ref · Catalog |
|---|---|---|---|
| 479553 Garyzema | 2014 BY_{63} | Gary Gene Zema (1953–2019) was an American musician and computer programmer from Belle Vernon, Pennsylvania. He played tuba and baritone horn, and was a singer and band leader in On The Lam, Zlatne Uste and Cornerstone Chorale. | JPL · 479553 |
