= List of minor planets: 411001–412000 =

The following is a partial list of minor planets, running from minor-planet number 411001 through 412000, inclusive. The primary data for this and other partial lists is based on JPL's "Small-Body Orbital Elements" and data available from the Minor Planet Center. Critical list information is also provided by the MPC, unless otherwise specified from Lowell Observatory. A detailed description of the table's columns and additional sources are given on the main page including a complete list of every page in this series, and a statistical break-up on the dynamical classification of minor planets.

Also see the summary list of all named bodies in numerical and alphabetical order, and the corresponding naming citations for the number range of this particular list. New namings may only be added to this list after official publication, as the preannouncement of names is condemned by the Working Group for Small Bodies Nomenclature of the International Astronomical Union.

Near-Earth obj.	MBA (inner)	MBA (outer)	Centaur
Mars-crosser	MBA (middle)	Jupiter trojan	Trans-Neptunian obj.
Unclassified

== 411001–411100 ==
Designation			Discovery			Properties		Ref
Permanent	Provisional	Named after	Date	Site	Discoverer(s)	Category	Diam.	Ref
411001	2009 UA_{52}	—	October 22, 2009	Mount Lemmon	Mount Lemmon Survey	·	3.0 km	MPC · JPL
411002	2009 UC_{54}	—	October 23, 2009	Mount Lemmon	Mount Lemmon Survey	·	1.7 km	MPC · JPL
411003	2009 UZ_{59}	—	January 7, 2006	Kitt Peak	Spacewatch	KOR	1.5 km	MPC · JPL
411004	2009 UG_{63}	—	October 17, 2009	Mount Lemmon	Mount Lemmon Survey	·	3.7 km	MPC · JPL
411005	2009 US_{69}	—	October 21, 2009	Mount Lemmon	Mount Lemmon Survey	·	2.4 km	MPC · JPL
411006	2009 UF_{70}	—	September 29, 2009	Mount Lemmon	Mount Lemmon Survey	EOS	1.5 km	MPC · JPL
411007	2009 UL_{71}	—	September 18, 2009	Mount Lemmon	Mount Lemmon Survey	·	4.0 km	MPC · JPL
411008	2009 UU_{73}	—	September 27, 2009	Mount Lemmon	Mount Lemmon Survey	·	2.3 km	MPC · JPL
411009	2009 UY_{79}	—	December 28, 1994	Kitt Peak	Spacewatch	·	2.3 km	MPC · JPL
411010	2009 UD_{80}	—	October 22, 2009	Mount Lemmon	Mount Lemmon Survey	EOS	2.3 km	MPC · JPL
411011	2009 UK_{82}	—	October 23, 2009	Kitt Peak	Spacewatch	·	3.3 km	MPC · JPL
411012	2009 UZ_{82}	—	September 18, 2009	Mount Lemmon	Mount Lemmon Survey	(21885)	3.9 km	MPC · JPL
411013	2009 UY_{85}	—	October 24, 2009	Mount Lemmon	Mount Lemmon Survey	·	2.1 km	MPC · JPL
411014	2009 UG_{90}	—	October 23, 2009	Socorro	LINEAR	·	2.7 km	MPC · JPL
411015	2009 UV_{93}	—	April 18, 2007	Mount Lemmon	Mount Lemmon Survey	EOS	2.1 km	MPC · JPL
411016	2009 UX_{96}	—	October 22, 2009	Mount Lemmon	Mount Lemmon Survey	·	2.5 km	MPC · JPL
411017	2009 UP_{97}	—	October 23, 2009	Mount Lemmon	Mount Lemmon Survey	·	3.6 km	MPC · JPL
411018	2009 UF_{98}	—	September 22, 2009	Mount Lemmon	Mount Lemmon Survey	·	2.4 km	MPC · JPL
411019	2009 UG_{99}	—	October 23, 2009	Mount Lemmon	Mount Lemmon Survey	·	2.7 km	MPC · JPL
411020	2009 UJ_{101}	—	October 23, 2009	Mount Lemmon	Mount Lemmon Survey	·	2.1 km	MPC · JPL
411021	2009 UG_{103}	—	September 21, 2009	Mount Lemmon	Mount Lemmon Survey	·	3.1 km	MPC · JPL
411022	2009 US_{105}	—	October 21, 2009	Mount Lemmon	Mount Lemmon Survey	EOS	2.0 km	MPC · JPL
411023	2009 UX_{105}	—	October 21, 2009	Mount Lemmon	Mount Lemmon Survey	·	4.3 km	MPC · JPL
411024	2009 UA_{106}	—	October 21, 2009	Mount Lemmon	Mount Lemmon Survey	EMA	4.3 km	MPC · JPL
411025	2009 UY_{107}	—	October 23, 2009	Kitt Peak	Spacewatch	EOS	1.9 km	MPC · JPL
411026	2009 UM_{110}	—	September 22, 2009	Mount Lemmon	Mount Lemmon Survey	·	2.5 km	MPC · JPL
411027	2009 UO_{110}	—	October 23, 2009	Kitt Peak	Spacewatch	·	2.8 km	MPC · JPL
411028	2009 UP_{110}	—	October 23, 2009	Kitt Peak	Spacewatch	·	3.0 km	MPC · JPL
411029	2009 UD_{111}	—	April 22, 2007	Mount Lemmon	Mount Lemmon Survey	EMA	3.4 km	MPC · JPL
411030	2009 UA_{117}	—	October 14, 2009	XuYi	PMO NEO Survey Program	·	2.9 km	MPC · JPL
411031	2009 UN_{119}	—	September 15, 2009	Kitt Peak	Spacewatch	EOS	1.6 km	MPC · JPL
411032	2009 UU_{123}	—	October 26, 2009	Mount Lemmon	Mount Lemmon Survey	·	3.3 km	MPC · JPL
411033	2009 UC_{124}	—	October 26, 2009	Mount Lemmon	Mount Lemmon Survey	·	3.7 km	MPC · JPL
411034	2009 UY_{128}	—	October 29, 2009	Bisei SG Center	BATTeRS	·	3.7 km	MPC · JPL
411035	2009 UY_{130}	—	October 16, 2009	Catalina	CSS	·	2.3 km	MPC · JPL
411036	2009 UR_{135}	—	October 17, 2009	Catalina	CSS	·	3.9 km	MPC · JPL
411037	2009 UP_{136}	—	October 24, 2009	Catalina	CSS	·	5.2 km	MPC · JPL
411038	2009 UC_{137}	—	October 27, 2009	Catalina	CSS	TIR	2.7 km	MPC · JPL
411039	2009 US_{140}	—	October 26, 2009	Kitt Peak	Spacewatch	·	3.1 km	MPC · JPL
411040	2009 UM_{142}	—	October 18, 2009	Mount Lemmon	Mount Lemmon Survey	VER	2.9 km	MPC · JPL
411041	2009 UF_{145}	—	October 16, 2009	Catalina	CSS	·	4.9 km	MPC · JPL
411042	2009 UP_{150}	—	October 18, 2009	Mount Lemmon	Mount Lemmon Survey	·	2.2 km	MPC · JPL
411043	2009 UB_{153}	—	October 24, 2009	Catalina	CSS	·	2.8 km	MPC · JPL
411044	2009 VY_{7}	—	October 21, 2009	Mount Lemmon	Mount Lemmon Survey	EOS	2.4 km	MPC · JPL
411045	2009 VO_{12}	—	November 8, 2009	Mount Lemmon	Mount Lemmon Survey	·	2.9 km	MPC · JPL
411046	2009 VU_{17}	—	November 8, 2009	Mount Lemmon	Mount Lemmon Survey	THM	2.1 km	MPC · JPL
411047	2009 VS_{20}	—	November 9, 2009	Mount Lemmon	Mount Lemmon Survey	·	2.6 km	MPC · JPL
411048	2009 VN_{21}	—	November 9, 2009	Mount Lemmon	Mount Lemmon Survey	EOS	2.3 km	MPC · JPL
411049	2009 VA_{25}	—	November 10, 2009	Dauban	Kugel, F.	EOS	2.2 km	MPC · JPL
411050	2009 VS_{27}	—	October 30, 2009	Mount Lemmon	Mount Lemmon Survey	·	2.0 km	MPC · JPL
411051	2009 VZ_{27}	—	November 8, 2009	Catalina	CSS	EOS	2.4 km	MPC · JPL
411052	2009 VP_{29}	—	November 9, 2009	Catalina	CSS	·	2.0 km	MPC · JPL
411053	2009 VD_{32}	—	November 9, 2009	Mount Lemmon	Mount Lemmon Survey	THM	1.6 km	MPC · JPL
411054	2009 VN_{38}	—	November 9, 2009	Kitt Peak	Spacewatch	·	2.0 km	MPC · JPL
411055	2009 VC_{44}	—	November 12, 2009	La Sagra	OAM	·	3.5 km	MPC · JPL
411056	2009 VY_{44}	—	November 14, 2009	Mayhill	Lowe, A.	·	4.9 km	MPC · JPL
411057	2009 VB_{46}	—	October 24, 2009	Kitt Peak	Spacewatch	·	2.3 km	MPC · JPL
411058	2009 VD_{48}	—	November 9, 2009	Mount Lemmon	Mount Lemmon Survey	·	2.3 km	MPC · JPL
411059	2009 VY_{49}	—	November 11, 2009	La Sagra	OAM	·	2.9 km	MPC · JPL
411060	2009 VZ_{49}	—	November 11, 2009	La Sagra	OAM	·	2.7 km	MPC · JPL
411061	2009 VE_{52}	—	November 10, 2009	Kitt Peak	Spacewatch	·	4.2 km	MPC · JPL
411062	2009 VJ_{53}	—	November 10, 2009	Mount Lemmon	Mount Lemmon Survey	·	5.3 km	MPC · JPL
411063	2009 VF_{58}	—	November 15, 2009	Catalina	CSS	·	1.9 km	MPC · JPL
411064	2009 VH_{59}	—	November 8, 2009	Catalina	CSS	·	2.6 km	MPC · JPL
411065	2009 VT_{60}	—	October 23, 2009	Mount Lemmon	Mount Lemmon Survey	·	2.8 km	MPC · JPL
411066	2009 VU_{60}	—	November 8, 2009	Kitt Peak	Spacewatch	·	3.4 km	MPC · JPL
411067	2009 VO_{61}	—	November 8, 2009	Kitt Peak	Spacewatch	·	3.9 km	MPC · JPL
411068	2009 VQ_{61}	—	November 8, 2009	Kitt Peak	Spacewatch	·	2.0 km	MPC · JPL
411069	2009 VL_{64}	—	September 23, 2009	Kitt Peak	Spacewatch	EOS	2.1 km	MPC · JPL
411070	2009 VG_{65}	—	November 9, 2009	Kitt Peak	Spacewatch	·	4.7 km	MPC · JPL
411071	2009 VK_{65}	—	November 9, 2009	Kitt Peak	Spacewatch	EOS	2.1 km	MPC · JPL
411072	2009 VK_{66}	—	November 9, 2009	Kitt Peak	Spacewatch	·	1.9 km	MPC · JPL
411073	2009 VM_{66}	—	November 9, 2009	Kitt Peak	Spacewatch	·	1.7 km	MPC · JPL
411074	2009 VM_{70}	—	October 17, 2009	Mount Lemmon	Mount Lemmon Survey	·	4.6 km	MPC · JPL
411075	2009 VH_{76}	—	November 15, 2009	Catalina	CSS	·	3.6 km	MPC · JPL
411076	2009 VU_{76}	—	October 14, 2009	Catalina	CSS	·	3.0 km	MPC · JPL
411077	2009 VR_{81}	—	November 8, 2009	Kitt Peak	Spacewatch	·	2.9 km	MPC · JPL
411078	2009 VG_{84}	—	October 17, 2009	Mount Lemmon	Mount Lemmon Survey	CYB	4.6 km	MPC · JPL
411079	2009 VK_{86}	—	September 21, 2003	Kitt Peak	Spacewatch	·	2.6 km	MPC · JPL
411080	2009 VF_{88}	—	October 26, 2009	Mount Lemmon	Mount Lemmon Survey	·	2.3 km	MPC · JPL
411081	2009 VL_{89}	—	November 11, 2009	Kitt Peak	Spacewatch	EOS ·	3.2 km	MPC · JPL
411082	2009 VB_{90}	—	October 15, 2009	Kitt Peak	Spacewatch	EOS	1.8 km	MPC · JPL
411083	2009 VU_{96}	—	October 26, 2009	Mount Lemmon	Mount Lemmon Survey	·	2.6 km	MPC · JPL
411084	2009 VR_{98}	—	March 25, 2006	Kitt Peak	Spacewatch	·	2.4 km	MPC · JPL
411085	2009 VQ_{99}	—	November 9, 2009	Mount Lemmon	Mount Lemmon Survey	·	3.7 km	MPC · JPL
411086	2009 VE_{100}	—	November 9, 2009	Mount Lemmon	Mount Lemmon Survey	·	3.4 km	MPC · JPL
411087	2009 VN_{104}	—	September 21, 2009	Mount Lemmon	Mount Lemmon Survey	H	570 m	MPC · JPL
411088	2009 VA_{111}	—	November 10, 2009	Kitt Peak	Spacewatch	·	6.6 km	MPC · JPL
411089	2009 VJ_{111}	—	November 11, 2009	La Sagra	OAM	·	3.5 km	MPC · JPL
411090	2009 VC_{112}	—	November 9, 2009	Catalina	CSS	·	3.3 km	MPC · JPL
411091	2009 VA_{116}	—	November 9, 2009	Mount Lemmon	Mount Lemmon Survey	HYG	2.6 km	MPC · JPL
411092	2009 WX_{1}	—	September 15, 2009	Kitt Peak	Spacewatch	·	2.5 km	MPC · JPL
411093	2009 WF_{2}	—	September 15, 2009	Kitt Peak	Spacewatch	·	1.9 km	MPC · JPL
411094	2009 WE_{8}	—	November 18, 2009	Saint-Sulpice	B. Christophe	·	3.5 km	MPC · JPL
411095	2009 WA_{26}	—	November 23, 2009	Mayhill	Lowe, A.	·	2.9 km	MPC · JPL
411096	2009 WM_{28}	—	October 12, 1998	Kitt Peak	Spacewatch	THM	1.9 km	MPC · JPL
411097	2009 WS_{29}	—	October 26, 2009	Kitt Peak	Spacewatch	·	3.6 km	MPC · JPL
411098	2009 WJ_{32}	—	November 16, 2009	Kitt Peak	Spacewatch	CYB	5.2 km	MPC · JPL
411099	2009 WE_{33}	—	November 8, 2009	Kitt Peak	Spacewatch	·	4.0 km	MPC · JPL
411100	2009 WK_{35}	—	November 17, 2009	Kitt Peak	Spacewatch	INA	3.1 km	MPC · JPL

== 411101–411200 ==
back to top

Designation			Discovery			Properties		Ref
Permanent	Provisional	Named after	Date	Site	Discoverer(s)	Category	Diam.	Ref
411101	2009 WU_{37}	—	October 26, 2009	Mount Lemmon	Mount Lemmon Survey	T_{j} (2.99)	4.6 km	MPC · JPL
411102	2009 WB_{40}	—	November 17, 2009	Kitt Peak	Spacewatch	·	4.1 km	MPC · JPL
411103	2009 WL_{41}	—	November 17, 2009	Mount Lemmon	Mount Lemmon Survey	·	2.2 km	MPC · JPL
411104	2009 WR_{43}	—	November 17, 2009	Kitt Peak	Spacewatch	·	4.2 km	MPC · JPL
411105	2009 WF_{49}	—	November 19, 2009	Mount Lemmon	Mount Lemmon Survey	·	3.3 km	MPC · JPL
411106	2009 WG_{49}	—	October 1, 2009	Mount Lemmon	Mount Lemmon Survey	·	3.3 km	MPC · JPL
411107	2009 WA_{51}	—	November 20, 2009	Mount Lemmon	Mount Lemmon Survey	·	4.0 km	MPC · JPL
411108	2009 WK_{71}	—	November 18, 2009	Kitt Peak	Spacewatch	·	1.9 km	MPC · JPL
411109	2009 WS_{71}	—	November 18, 2009	Kitt Peak	Spacewatch	·	3.3 km	MPC · JPL
411110	2009 WZ_{72}	—	November 18, 2009	Kitt Peak	Spacewatch	·	2.3 km	MPC · JPL
411111	2009 WV_{76}	—	February 14, 2005	Kitt Peak	Spacewatch	·	3.0 km	MPC · JPL
411112	2009 WB_{82}	—	December 25, 2005	Kitt Peak	Spacewatch	·	1.9 km	MPC · JPL
411113	2009 WP_{83}	—	November 19, 2009	Kitt Peak	Spacewatch	·	3.6 km	MPC · JPL
411114	2009 WR_{86}	—	September 6, 2008	Mount Lemmon	Mount Lemmon Survey	·	2.5 km	MPC · JPL
411115	2009 WL_{98}	—	November 8, 2009	Kitt Peak	Spacewatch	EMA	4.3 km	MPC · JPL
411116	2009 WC_{111}	—	November 17, 2009	Mount Lemmon	Mount Lemmon Survey	EOS	1.6 km	MPC · JPL
411117	2009 WO_{122}	—	October 22, 2003	Socorro	LINEAR	·	3.5 km	MPC · JPL
411118	2009 WE_{124}	—	September 22, 2009	Mount Lemmon	Mount Lemmon Survey	·	3.3 km	MPC · JPL
411119	2009 WJ_{130}	—	November 9, 2009	Kitt Peak	Spacewatch	HYG	2.8 km	MPC · JPL
411120	2009 WL_{134}	—	November 22, 2009	Catalina	CSS	·	3.7 km	MPC · JPL
411121	2009 WY_{143}	—	November 19, 2009	Kitt Peak	Spacewatch	·	3.1 km	MPC · JPL
411122	2009 WN_{155}	—	November 20, 2009	La Sagra	OAM	·	3.5 km	MPC · JPL
411123	2009 WZ_{163}	—	November 21, 2009	Kitt Peak	Spacewatch	·	2.9 km	MPC · JPL
411124	2009 WK_{172}	—	November 22, 2009	Mount Lemmon	Mount Lemmon Survey	·	3.8 km	MPC · JPL
411125	2009 WQ_{190}	—	September 22, 2003	Kitt Peak	Spacewatch	THM	1.8 km	MPC · JPL
411126	2009 WJ_{191}	—	November 24, 2009	Mount Lemmon	Mount Lemmon Survey	·	3.5 km	MPC · JPL
411127	2009 WF_{193}	—	September 22, 2009	Mount Lemmon	Mount Lemmon Survey	·	2.7 km	MPC · JPL
411128	2009 WE_{206}	—	March 16, 2007	Mount Lemmon	Mount Lemmon Survey	·	3.0 km	MPC · JPL
411129	2009 WS_{207}	—	November 17, 2009	Kitt Peak	Spacewatch	·	1.9 km	MPC · JPL
411130	2009 WU_{209}	—	November 17, 2009	Catalina	CSS	·	4.3 km	MPC · JPL
411131	2009 WA_{216}	—	August 21, 2003	Campo Imperatore	CINEOS	EOS	2.1 km	MPC · JPL
411132	2009 WD_{218}	—	November 18, 2009	Mount Lemmon	Mount Lemmon Survey	·	2.9 km	MPC · JPL
411133	2009 WO_{218}	—	November 16, 2009	Kitt Peak	Spacewatch	·	4.6 km	MPC · JPL
411134	2009 WT_{220}	—	November 16, 2009	Mount Lemmon	Mount Lemmon Survey	·	3.0 km	MPC · JPL
411135	2009 WV_{220}	—	November 16, 2009	Mount Lemmon	Mount Lemmon Survey	·	2.9 km	MPC · JPL
411136	2009 WZ_{229}	—	September 18, 2009	Mount Lemmon	Mount Lemmon Survey	·	2.7 km	MPC · JPL
411137	2009 WA_{232}	—	November 17, 2009	Mount Lemmon	Mount Lemmon Survey	·	5.0 km	MPC · JPL
411138	2009 WG_{237}	—	November 17, 2009	Kitt Peak	Spacewatch	·	3.0 km	MPC · JPL
411139	2009 WN_{249}	—	November 17, 2009	Catalina	CSS	·	4.2 km	MPC · JPL
411140	2009 WU_{249}	—	November 17, 2009	Kitt Peak	Spacewatch	·	3.1 km	MPC · JPL
411141	2009 WW_{252}	—	November 27, 2009	Kitt Peak	Spacewatch	·	2.6 km	MPC · JPL
411142	2009 WZ_{262}	—	November 23, 2009	Mount Lemmon	Mount Lemmon Survey	·	2.9 km	MPC · JPL
411143	2009 XL	—	December 6, 2009	Bisei SG Center	BATTeRS	THM	2.8 km	MPC · JPL
411144	2009 XV_{2}	—	December 12, 2009	Mayhill	Nevski, V.	·	2.3 km	MPC · JPL
411145	2009 XZ_{10}	—	October 27, 2005	Kitt Peak	Spacewatch	·	1.3 km	MPC · JPL
411146	2009 XQ_{23}	—	September 22, 2009	Mount Lemmon	Mount Lemmon Survey	·	3.9 km	MPC · JPL
411147	2009 YB_{14}	—	November 21, 2009	Mount Lemmon	Mount Lemmon Survey	·	2.0 km	MPC · JPL
411148	2009 YN_{22}	—	October 15, 2009	Mount Lemmon	Mount Lemmon Survey	·	2.4 km	MPC · JPL
411149	2009 YD_{24}	—	December 16, 2009	Mount Lemmon	Mount Lemmon Survey	·	4.6 km	MPC · JPL
411150	2010 AV_{4}	—	January 4, 2010	Kitt Peak	Spacewatch	·	3.0 km	MPC · JPL
411151	2010 AY_{10}	—	November 26, 2003	Kitt Peak	Spacewatch	EOS ·	2.4 km	MPC · JPL
411152	2010 AS_{39}	—	January 6, 2010	Socorro	LINEAR	·	5.0 km	MPC · JPL
411153	2010 AV_{41}	—	September 30, 2009	Mount Lemmon	Mount Lemmon Survey	·	3.1 km	MPC · JPL
411154	2010 AM_{84}	—	September 18, 2009	Kitt Peak	Spacewatch	·	5.1 km	MPC · JPL
411155	2010 AP_{110}	—	January 13, 2010	WISE	WISE	·	3.8 km	MPC · JPL
411156	2010 AZ_{111}	—	September 29, 2009	Mount Lemmon	Mount Lemmon Survey	·	3.3 km	MPC · JPL
411157	2010 AY_{134}	—	January 15, 2010	WISE	WISE	·	2.4 km	MPC · JPL
411158	2010 AL_{136}	—	September 21, 2009	Mount Lemmon	Mount Lemmon Survey	·	5.1 km	MPC · JPL
411159	2010 BN_{5}	—	January 24, 2010	Moletai	K. Černis, Zdanavicius, J.	·	4.4 km	MPC · JPL
411160	2010 BP_{31}	—	January 18, 2010	WISE	WISE	·	2.9 km	MPC · JPL
411161	2010 BM_{88}	—	March 2, 2006	Kitt Peak	Spacewatch	·	3.6 km	MPC · JPL
411162	2010 BW_{95}	—	January 27, 2010	WISE	WISE	·	3.6 km	MPC · JPL
411163	2010 BG_{104}	—	April 20, 2007	Kitt Peak	Spacewatch	·	2.6 km	MPC · JPL
411164	2010 CK_{145}	—	October 8, 2008	Mount Lemmon	Mount Lemmon Survey	·	1.4 km	MPC · JPL
411165	2010 DF_{1}	—	February 17, 2010	Kitt Peak	Spacewatch	APO	160 m	MPC · JPL
411166	2010 DU_{18}	—	February 16, 2010	WISE	WISE	·	1.5 km	MPC · JPL
411167	2010 DV_{19}	—	May 3, 2006	Kitt Peak	Spacewatch	·	3.9 km	MPC · JPL
411168	2010 DD_{29}	—	September 29, 1997	Kitt Peak	Spacewatch	·	3.7 km	MPC · JPL
411169	2010 EC_{34}	—	February 14, 2010	Mount Lemmon	Mount Lemmon Survey	H	560 m	MPC · JPL
411170	2010 EW_{80}	—	April 15, 2007	Catalina	CSS	·	710 m	MPC · JPL
411171	2010 EO_{82}	—	March 12, 2010	Kitt Peak	Spacewatch	·	730 m	MPC · JPL
411172	2010 EK_{83}	—	March 12, 2010	Kitt Peak	Spacewatch	·	860 m	MPC · JPL
411173	2010 EY_{103}	—	March 15, 2010	Mount Lemmon	Mount Lemmon Survey	·	580 m	MPC · JPL
411174	2010 FZ_{15}	—	March 18, 2010	Kitt Peak	Spacewatch	·	770 m	MPC · JPL
411175	2010 FJ_{34}	—	March 8, 2005	Catalina	CSS	·	5.1 km	MPC · JPL
411176	2010 FU_{54}	—	March 21, 2010	Kitt Peak	Spacewatch	·	590 m	MPC · JPL
411177	2010 FO_{79}	—	March 15, 2010	Kitt Peak	Spacewatch	·	2.7 km	MPC · JPL
411178	2010 FN_{87}	—	March 19, 2010	Kitt Peak	Spacewatch	·	780 m	MPC · JPL
411179	2010 GS_{32}	—	April 8, 2010	Mount Lemmon	Mount Lemmon Survey	·	620 m	MPC · JPL
411180	2010 GM_{98}	—	April 10, 2010	Mount Lemmon	Mount Lemmon Survey	·	650 m	MPC · JPL
411181	2010 GH_{118}	—	January 27, 2006	Kitt Peak	Spacewatch	·	690 m	MPC · JPL
411182	2010 GQ_{137}	—	April 18, 2007	Mount Lemmon	Mount Lemmon Survey	·	620 m	MPC · JPL
411183	2010 GD_{144}	—	April 11, 2010	Kitt Peak	Spacewatch	·	700 m	MPC · JPL
411184	2010 HU_{10}	—	April 17, 2010	WISE	WISE	·	2.3 km	MPC · JPL
411185	2010 HE_{48}	—	April 24, 2010	WISE	WISE	·	1.5 km	MPC · JPL
411186	2010 JP_{1}	—	May 4, 2010	Kitt Peak	Spacewatch	PHO	1.0 km	MPC · JPL
411187	2010 JO_{40}	—	January 30, 2006	Kitt Peak	Spacewatch	·	770 m	MPC · JPL
411188	2010 JC_{43}	—	April 8, 2010	Kitt Peak	Spacewatch	·	1.6 km	MPC · JPL
411189	2010 JV_{45}	—	May 7, 2010	Kitt Peak	Spacewatch	·	1.2 km	MPC · JPL
411190	2010 JF_{66}	—	May 9, 2010	WISE	WISE	·	2.0 km	MPC · JPL
411191	2010 JZ_{84}	—	May 6, 2010	Mount Lemmon	Mount Lemmon Survey	·	580 m	MPC · JPL
411192	2010 JE_{116}	—	May 7, 2010	Mount Lemmon	Mount Lemmon Survey	·	910 m	MPC · JPL
411193	2010 JE_{148}	—	April 15, 2010	Kitt Peak	Spacewatch	·	1.2 km	MPC · JPL
411194	2010 JT_{171}	—	May 5, 2010	La Sagra	OAM	PHO	1.2 km	MPC · JPL
411195	2010 KW_{3}	—	May 16, 2010	WISE	WISE	·	1.6 km	MPC · JPL
411196	2010 KU_{47}	—	May 21, 2010	WISE	WISE	·	1.6 km	MPC · JPL
411197	2010 KJ_{110}	—	May 29, 2010	WISE	WISE	·	1.9 km	MPC · JPL
411198	2010 KD_{116}	—	May 30, 2010	WISE	WISE	·	1.9 km	MPC · JPL
411199	2010 KW_{117}	—	May 19, 2010	Catalina	CSS	·	1.2 km	MPC · JPL
411200	2010 KB_{118}	—	May 17, 2010	Nogales	Tenagra II	·	1.1 km	MPC · JPL

== 411201–411300 ==
back to top

Designation			Discovery			Properties		Ref
Permanent	Provisional	Named after	Date	Site	Discoverer(s)	Category	Diam.	Ref
411201	2010 LJ_{14}	—	June 5, 2010	Kitt Peak	Spacewatch	AMO +1km · slow	660 m	MPC · JPL
411202	2010 LU_{17}	—	June 3, 2010	WISE	WISE	·	3.2 km	MPC · JPL
411203	2010 LL_{35}	—	June 5, 2010	Kitt Peak	Spacewatch	·	1.7 km	MPC · JPL
411204	2010 LZ_{51}	—	June 8, 2010	WISE	WISE	·	3.8 km	MPC · JPL
411205	2010 LV_{79}	—	June 10, 2010	WISE	WISE	JUN	1.5 km	MPC · JPL
411206	2010 LL_{110}	—	May 7, 2010	Mount Lemmon	Mount Lemmon Survey	·	870 m	MPC · JPL
411207	2010 LN_{110}	—	June 11, 2010	Mount Lemmon	Mount Lemmon Survey	·	850 m	MPC · JPL
411208	2010 MM_{97}	—	August 30, 2006	Anderson Mesa	LONEOS	NYS	1.9 km	MPC · JPL
411209	2010 MO_{97}	—	October 4, 2006	Mount Lemmon	Mount Lemmon Survey	·	1.7 km	MPC · JPL
411210	2010 NZ_{6}	—	July 7, 2010	Kitt Peak	Spacewatch	·	1.1 km	MPC · JPL
411211	2010 NU_{14}	—	July 5, 2010	WISE	WISE	·	2.7 km	MPC · JPL
411212	2010 NV_{22}	—	July 6, 2010	WISE	WISE	·	3.1 km	MPC · JPL
411213	2010 NU_{25}	—	July 7, 2010	WISE	WISE	·	3.4 km	MPC · JPL
411214	2010 NC_{63}	—	July 11, 2010	WISE	WISE	ADE	2.0 km	MPC · JPL
411215	2010 NP_{68}	—	July 14, 2010	WISE	WISE	·	1.5 km	MPC · JPL
411216	2010 NM_{69}	—	November 10, 2006	Kitt Peak	Spacewatch	·	1.7 km	MPC · JPL
411217	2010 ND_{87}	—	November 18, 2006	Catalina	CSS	(194)	2.7 km	MPC · JPL
411218	2010 NS_{103}	—	July 12, 2010	WISE	WISE	·	2.7 km	MPC · JPL
411219	2010 OE_{14}	—	July 17, 2010	WISE	WISE	·	3.0 km	MPC · JPL
411220	2010 OO_{19}	—	October 21, 2006	Kitt Peak	Spacewatch	·	2.1 km	MPC · JPL
411221	2010 OV_{28}	—	July 19, 2010	WISE	WISE	ADE	2.6 km	MPC · JPL
411222	2010 OV_{37}	—	October 20, 2006	Mount Lemmon	Mount Lemmon Survey	·	2.0 km	MPC · JPL
411223	2010 OO_{49}	—	November 17, 2006	Mount Lemmon	Mount Lemmon Survey	ADE	1.9 km	MPC · JPL
411224	2010 OL_{74}	—	October 30, 2006	Catalina	CSS	·	2.4 km	MPC · JPL
411225	2010 OZ_{86}	—	May 4, 2010	Catalina	CSS	PHO	2.2 km	MPC · JPL
411226	2010 OO_{106}	—	November 20, 2006	Catalina	CSS	·	2.9 km	MPC · JPL
411227	2010 OV_{108}	—	July 29, 2010	WISE	WISE	·	2.0 km	MPC · JPL
411228	2010 PW_{1}	—	October 18, 2003	Kitt Peak	Spacewatch	·	1.3 km	MPC · JPL
411229	2010 PD_{49}	—	March 28, 2008	Mount Lemmon	Mount Lemmon Survey	·	2.5 km	MPC · JPL
411230	2010 PB_{52}	—	June 18, 2010	Mount Lemmon	Mount Lemmon Survey	·	2.4 km	MPC · JPL
411231	2010 PG_{57}	—	August 3, 2010	La Sagra	OAM	·	1.8 km	MPC · JPL
411232	2010 PX_{61}	—	August 10, 2010	Kitt Peak	Spacewatch	·	1.6 km	MPC · JPL
411233	2010 PH_{62}	—	August 10, 2010	Kitt Peak	Spacewatch	·	1.1 km	MPC · JPL
411234	2010 PH_{65}	—	August 10, 2010	Kitt Peak	Spacewatch	KON	2.4 km	MPC · JPL
411235	2010 PX_{73}	—	August 10, 2010	Kitt Peak	Spacewatch	NYS	1.2 km	MPC · JPL
411236	2010 PP_{75}	—	August 13, 2010	Kitt Peak	Spacewatch	·	1.3 km	MPC · JPL
411237	2010 PE_{80}	—	August 12, 2010	Kitt Peak	Spacewatch	·	1.0 km	MPC · JPL
411238	2010 QK_{2}	—	March 3, 2009	Mount Lemmon	Mount Lemmon Survey	·	1.5 km	MPC · JPL
411239	2010 QK_{6}	—	August 20, 2010	La Sagra	OAM	·	1.3 km	MPC · JPL
411240	2010 RG_{9}	—	June 20, 2010	Mount Lemmon	Mount Lemmon Survey	NYS	1.2 km	MPC · JPL
411241	2010 RF_{23}	—	September 3, 2010	Mount Lemmon	Mount Lemmon Survey	·	1.6 km	MPC · JPL
411242	2010 RF_{39}	—	December 21, 2007	Mount Lemmon	Mount Lemmon Survey	PHO	1.2 km	MPC · JPL
411243	2010 RY_{40}	—	September 3, 2010	Piszkéstető	K. Sárneczky, Kuli, Z.	·	1.3 km	MPC · JPL
411244	2010 RB_{62}	—	September 6, 2010	Kitt Peak	Spacewatch	·	1.5 km	MPC · JPL
411245	2010 RZ_{68}	—	July 21, 2006	Catalina	CSS	·	1.5 km	MPC · JPL
411246	2010 RM_{73}	—	November 14, 1995	Kitt Peak	Spacewatch	NYS	1 km	MPC · JPL
411247	2010 RP_{75}	—	October 18, 2006	Kitt Peak	Spacewatch	(5)	1.0 km	MPC · JPL
411248	2010 RL_{80}	—	December 17, 2003	Kitt Peak	Spacewatch	·	1.3 km	MPC · JPL
411249	2010 RY_{82}	—	April 30, 2005	Kitt Peak	Spacewatch	V	750 m	MPC · JPL
411250	2010 RB_{86}	—	September 2, 2010	Mount Lemmon	Mount Lemmon Survey	·	1.1 km	MPC · JPL
411251	2010 RO_{90}	—	March 28, 2009	Kitt Peak	Spacewatch	·	1.3 km	MPC · JPL
411252	2010 RX_{92}	—	August 13, 2010	Kitt Peak	Spacewatch	EUN	950 m	MPC · JPL
411253	2010 RU_{104}	—	April 18, 2009	Mount Lemmon	Mount Lemmon Survey	EUN	870 m	MPC · JPL
411254	2010 RF_{109}	—	March 9, 2005	Mount Lemmon	Mount Lemmon Survey	·	1.3 km	MPC · JPL
411255	2010 RW_{110}	—	September 19, 2006	Kitt Peak	Spacewatch	EUN	960 m	MPC · JPL
411256	2010 RU_{118}	—	March 1, 2008	Mount Lemmon	Mount Lemmon Survey	·	1.5 km	MPC · JPL
411257	2010 RA_{120}	—	July 5, 2005	Kitt Peak	Spacewatch	·	1.5 km	MPC · JPL
411258	2010 RS_{120}	—	September 11, 2010	Catalina	CSS	·	1.7 km	MPC · JPL
411259	2010 RQ_{122}	—	May 3, 2005	Kitt Peak	Spacewatch	·	1.1 km	MPC · JPL
411260	2010 RQ_{123}	—	September 10, 2010	Kitt Peak	Spacewatch	·	1.7 km	MPC · JPL
411261	2010 RJ_{124}	—	September 11, 2010	Kitt Peak	Spacewatch	·	1.7 km	MPC · JPL
411262	2010 RD_{125}	—	August 18, 2006	Kitt Peak	Spacewatch	·	880 m	MPC · JPL
411263	2010 RV_{126}	—	September 12, 2010	Kitt Peak	Spacewatch	·	970 m	MPC · JPL
411264	2010 RZ_{127}	—	September 14, 2010	Kitt Peak	Spacewatch	·	1.3 km	MPC · JPL
411265	2010 RP_{139}	—	August 13, 2010	Kitt Peak	Spacewatch	·	970 m	MPC · JPL
411266	2010 RW_{139}	—	May 30, 2006	Mount Lemmon	Mount Lemmon Survey	NYS	1.1 km	MPC · JPL
411267	2010 RS_{144}	—	October 20, 2006	Kitt Peak	Spacewatch	·	1.1 km	MPC · JPL
411268	2010 RW_{148}	—	September 25, 2006	Kitt Peak	Spacewatch	·	1.9 km	MPC · JPL
411269	2010 RJ_{153}	—	October 3, 2006	Mount Lemmon	Mount Lemmon Survey	·	1.1 km	MPC · JPL
411270	2010 RR_{155}	—	May 9, 2005	Kitt Peak	Spacewatch	·	1.0 km	MPC · JPL
411271	2010 RF_{158}	—	September 28, 2006	Catalina	CSS	·	1.2 km	MPC · JPL
411272	2010 RM_{160}	—	September 16, 2006	Catalina	CSS	·	830 m	MPC · JPL
411273	2010 RB_{175}	—	September 9, 2010	Kitt Peak	Spacewatch	·	1.2 km	MPC · JPL
411274	2010 RW_{176}	—	September 26, 2006	Kitt Peak	Spacewatch	(5)	880 m	MPC · JPL
411275	2010 SK_{2}	—	April 5, 2000	Socorro	LINEAR	·	1.8 km	MPC · JPL
411276	2010 ST_{2}	—	September 16, 2010	Mount Lemmon	Mount Lemmon Survey	·	1.4 km	MPC · JPL
411277	2010 SN_{6}	—	September 16, 2010	Mount Lemmon	Mount Lemmon Survey	·	1.4 km	MPC · JPL
411278	2010 SL_{10}	—	August 6, 2010	Kitt Peak	Spacewatch	·	2.2 km	MPC · JPL
411279	2010 SK_{11}	—	September 18, 2010	Mount Lemmon	Mount Lemmon Survey	·	1.7 km	MPC · JPL
411280	2010 SL_{13}	—	September 19, 2010	Kitt Peak	Spacewatch	AMO	490 m	MPC · JPL
411281	2010 SY_{29}	—	March 13, 2005	Kitt Peak	Spacewatch	·	1.6 km	MPC · JPL
411282	2010 SP_{30}	—	November 2, 2006	Mount Lemmon	Mount Lemmon Survey	·	1.5 km	MPC · JPL
411283	2010 SZ_{32}	—	September 28, 2006	Mount Lemmon	Mount Lemmon Survey	·	1.3 km	MPC · JPL
411284	2010 SG_{36}	—	April 15, 2008	Mount Lemmon	Mount Lemmon Survey	·	1.5 km	MPC · JPL
411285	2010 TM_{1}	—	February 2, 2008	Mount Lemmon	Mount Lemmon Survey	·	1.2 km	MPC · JPL
411286	2010 TF_{6}	—	May 17, 2009	Mount Lemmon	Mount Lemmon Survey	·	1.1 km	MPC · JPL
411287	2010 TE_{12}	—	September 16, 2010	Catalina	CSS	·	1.8 km	MPC · JPL
411288	2010 TH_{13}	—	February 10, 2008	Kitt Peak	Spacewatch	·	1.0 km	MPC · JPL
411289	2010 TR_{14}	—	July 12, 2010	WISE	WISE	·	2.1 km	MPC · JPL
411290	2010 TJ_{15}	—	March 4, 2008	Kitt Peak	Spacewatch	·	1.2 km	MPC · JPL
411291	2010 TP_{17}	—	October 3, 2010	Kitt Peak	Spacewatch	·	2.0 km	MPC · JPL
411292	2010 TS_{37}	—	September 10, 2010	Mount Lemmon	Mount Lemmon Survey	·	980 m	MPC · JPL
411293	2010 TU_{55}	—	September 2, 2010	Mount Lemmon	Mount Lemmon Survey	·	1.1 km	MPC · JPL
411294	2010 TT_{69}	—	October 3, 2006	Mount Lemmon	Mount Lemmon Survey	·	1.7 km	MPC · JPL
411295	2010 TF_{76}	—	November 1, 2006	Kitt Peak	Spacewatch	(5)	780 m	MPC · JPL
411296	2010 TH_{79}	—	September 30, 2006	Mount Lemmon	Mount Lemmon Survey	·	1.2 km	MPC · JPL
411297	2010 TH_{80}	—	October 4, 2006	Mount Lemmon	Mount Lemmon Survey	·	1.2 km	MPC · JPL
411298	2010 TV_{83}	—	September 19, 2006	Kitt Peak	Spacewatch	·	1.2 km	MPC · JPL
411299	2010 TD_{88}	—	September 17, 2006	Kitt Peak	Spacewatch	·	840 m	MPC · JPL
411300	2010 TT_{92}	—	April 19, 2009	Mount Lemmon	Mount Lemmon Survey	PHO	910 m	MPC · JPL

== 411301–411400 ==
back to top

Designation			Discovery			Properties		Ref
Permanent	Provisional	Named after	Date	Site	Discoverer(s)	Category	Diam.	Ref
411301	2010 TP_{97}	—	September 19, 2010	Kitt Peak	Spacewatch	·	1.1 km	MPC · JPL
411302	2010 TR_{97}	—	October 23, 2006	Kitt Peak	Spacewatch	·	1.4 km	MPC · JPL
411303	2010 TQ_{113}	—	September 30, 2006	Mount Lemmon	Mount Lemmon Survey	EUN	1.1 km	MPC · JPL
411304	2010 TL_{114}	—	April 13, 2004	Kitt Peak	Spacewatch	·	2.0 km	MPC · JPL
411305	2010 TS_{116}	—	October 9, 2010	Kitt Peak	Spacewatch	·	1.4 km	MPC · JPL
411306	2010 TG_{118}	—	November 18, 2006	Kitt Peak	Spacewatch	·	1.8 km	MPC · JPL
411307	2010 TL_{131}	—	October 3, 2006	Mount Lemmon	Mount Lemmon Survey	·	1.1 km	MPC · JPL
411308	2010 TY_{139}	—	September 17, 2010	Mount Lemmon	Mount Lemmon Survey	·	1.9 km	MPC · JPL
411309	2010 TV_{143}	—	October 11, 2010	Mount Lemmon	Mount Lemmon Survey	·	2.3 km	MPC · JPL
411310	2010 TF_{144}	—	October 4, 2006	Mount Lemmon	Mount Lemmon Survey	·	730 m	MPC · JPL
411311	2010 TJ_{146}	—	November 17, 2006	Kitt Peak	Spacewatch	·	1.1 km	MPC · JPL
411312	2010 TX_{146}	—	November 19, 2001	Socorro	LINEAR	HOF	2.4 km	MPC · JPL
411313	2010 TY_{147}	—	May 18, 2009	Mount Lemmon	Mount Lemmon Survey	·	1.8 km	MPC · JPL
411314	2010 TJ_{149}	—	December 4, 2007	Kitt Peak	Spacewatch	·	760 m	MPC · JPL
411315	2010 TJ_{162}	—	April 9, 2003	Kitt Peak	Spacewatch	·	1.7 km	MPC · JPL
411316	2010 TA_{168}	—	September 17, 2010	Mount Lemmon	Mount Lemmon Survey	(5)	1.1 km	MPC · JPL
411317	2010 TN_{178}	—	February 12, 2004	Kitt Peak	Spacewatch	NYS	920 m	MPC · JPL
411318	2010 UU	—	September 18, 2010	Mount Lemmon	Mount Lemmon Survey	·	1.3 km	MPC · JPL
411319	2010 UD_{4}	—	October 4, 2006	Mount Lemmon	Mount Lemmon Survey	·	1.1 km	MPC · JPL
411320	2010 UC_{6}	—	April 27, 2009	Kitt Peak	Spacewatch	·	1.9 km	MPC · JPL
411321	2010 UZ_{11}	—	March 6, 2008	Mount Lemmon	Mount Lemmon Survey	·	1.4 km	MPC · JPL
411322	2010 UG_{12}	—	September 17, 2010	Mount Lemmon	Mount Lemmon Survey	EUN	1.4 km	MPC · JPL
411323	2010 UY_{15}	—	November 23, 2006	Kitt Peak	Spacewatch	(5)	1.4 km	MPC · JPL
411324	2010 UO_{16}	—	October 8, 2010	Catalina	CSS	·	1.6 km	MPC · JPL
411325	2010 UT_{21}	—	December 26, 2006	Kitt Peak	Spacewatch	·	1.6 km	MPC · JPL
411326	2010 UU_{21}	—	September 27, 2006	Mount Lemmon	Mount Lemmon Survey	(5)	1.2 km	MPC · JPL
411327	2010 UZ_{27}	—	November 20, 2006	Kitt Peak	Spacewatch	·	1.4 km	MPC · JPL
411328	2010 UW_{28}	—	December 27, 2006	Kitt Peak	Spacewatch	·	1.1 km	MPC · JPL
411329	2010 UM_{30}	—	September 30, 2006	Mount Lemmon	Mount Lemmon Survey	HNS	1.1 km	MPC · JPL
411330	2010 UN_{34}	—	November 17, 2006	Kitt Peak	Spacewatch	(5)	1.0 km	MPC · JPL
411331	2010 UM_{36}	—	October 21, 2006	Mount Lemmon	Mount Lemmon Survey	EUN	1.4 km	MPC · JPL
411332	2010 UA_{37}	—	October 29, 2010	Mount Lemmon	Mount Lemmon Survey	BRG	2.1 km	MPC · JPL
411333	2010 UD_{37}	—	September 10, 2005	Anderson Mesa	LONEOS	·	2.4 km	MPC · JPL
411334	2010 UN_{49}	—	August 24, 2001	Kitt Peak	Spacewatch	·	1.2 km	MPC · JPL
411335	2010 UL_{52}	—	October 28, 2010	Mount Lemmon	Mount Lemmon Survey	·	2.1 km	MPC · JPL
411336	2010 UN_{53}	—	October 4, 2006	Mount Lemmon	Mount Lemmon Survey	·	2.1 km	MPC · JPL
411337	2010 UP_{53}	—	October 29, 2010	Kitt Peak	Spacewatch	·	1.6 km	MPC · JPL
411338	2010 UA_{56}	—	December 26, 2006	Catalina	CSS	·	2.1 km	MPC · JPL
411339	2010 UY_{56}	—	July 13, 2010	WISE	WISE	·	1.7 km	MPC · JPL
411340	2010 UU_{58}	—	October 29, 2010	Kitt Peak	Spacewatch	EOS	2.4 km	MPC · JPL
411341	2010 UB_{60}	—	October 29, 2010	Kitt Peak	Spacewatch	·	1.5 km	MPC · JPL
411342	2010 UJ_{64}	—	August 24, 2001	Kitt Peak	Spacewatch	·	1.2 km	MPC · JPL
411343	2010 US_{64}	—	March 5, 2008	Kitt Peak	Spacewatch	·	1.6 km	MPC · JPL
411344	2010 UE_{65}	—	November 15, 2006	Kitt Peak	Spacewatch	·	1.0 km	MPC · JPL
411345	2010 UR_{66}	—	October 1, 2005	Kitt Peak	Spacewatch	·	2.2 km	MPC · JPL
411346	2010 UY_{70}	—	October 29, 2010	Catalina	CSS	·	1.7 km	MPC · JPL
411347	2010 UR_{73}	—	September 16, 2010	Catalina	CSS	·	2.0 km	MPC · JPL
411348	2010 UA_{75}	—	December 31, 2002	Socorro	LINEAR	·	1.8 km	MPC · JPL
411349	2010 UP_{75}	—	October 7, 2005	Kitt Peak	Spacewatch	·	1.9 km	MPC · JPL
411350	2010 UG_{76}	—	August 19, 2006	Kitt Peak	Spacewatch	·	1.4 km	MPC · JPL
411351	2010 UO_{76}	—	October 30, 2010	Catalina	CSS	EUN	1.3 km	MPC · JPL
411352	2010 UE_{77}	—	October 30, 2010	Kitt Peak	Spacewatch	·	1.5 km	MPC · JPL
411353	2010 UQ_{78}	—	November 18, 2006	Kitt Peak	Spacewatch	·	950 m	MPC · JPL
411354	2010 UR_{81}	—	February 13, 2008	Mount Lemmon	Mount Lemmon Survey	(5)	1.2 km	MPC · JPL
411355	2010 UV_{82}	—	October 29, 2010	Kitt Peak	Spacewatch	·	1.9 km	MPC · JPL
411356	2010 US_{83}	—	October 9, 2010	Catalina	CSS	ADE	2.1 km	MPC · JPL
411357	2010 UV_{83}	—	April 30, 2009	Mount Lemmon	Mount Lemmon Survey	·	2.2 km	MPC · JPL
411358	2010 UQ_{84}	—	April 14, 2004	Kitt Peak	Spacewatch	·	2.0 km	MPC · JPL
411359	2010 UK_{87}	—	October 18, 2006	Kitt Peak	Spacewatch	·	890 m	MPC · JPL
411360	2010 UC_{88}	—	August 12, 2010	Kitt Peak	Spacewatch	·	1.5 km	MPC · JPL
411361	2010 UR_{89}	—	September 27, 2006	Mount Lemmon	Mount Lemmon Survey	·	1.1 km	MPC · JPL
411362	2010 US_{93}	—	October 13, 2010	Mount Lemmon	Mount Lemmon Survey	·	1.9 km	MPC · JPL
411363	2010 UO_{94}	—	January 10, 2003	Socorro	LINEAR	·	2.0 km	MPC · JPL
411364	2010 UO_{97}	—	December 14, 2001	Socorro	LINEAR	AEO	1.2 km	MPC · JPL
411365	2010 UY_{101}	—	October 31, 2010	Mount Lemmon	Mount Lemmon Survey	·	2.3 km	MPC · JPL
411366	2010 UF_{102}	—	September 11, 2010	Mount Lemmon	Mount Lemmon Survey	·	1.7 km	MPC · JPL
411367	2010 UP_{107}	—	February 13, 2008	Kitt Peak	Spacewatch	(5)	1.3 km	MPC · JPL
411368	2010 VM_{14}	—	November 1, 2010	Catalina	CSS	·	1.8 km	MPC · JPL
411369	2010 VT_{19}	—	September 16, 2010	Mount Lemmon	Mount Lemmon Survey	(5)	1.3 km	MPC · JPL
411370	2010 VR_{27}	—	May 29, 2009	Mount Lemmon	Mount Lemmon Survey	EUN	1.3 km	MPC · JPL
411371	2010 VL_{30}	—	November 1, 1999	Kitt Peak	Spacewatch	·	1.3 km	MPC · JPL
411372	2010 VM_{32}	—	May 11, 2008	Kitt Peak	Spacewatch	·	1.9 km	MPC · JPL
411373	2010 VS_{47}	—	November 2, 2010	Kitt Peak	Spacewatch	·	2.2 km	MPC · JPL
411374	2010 VD_{50}	—	September 1, 2005	Kitt Peak	Spacewatch	·	1.8 km	MPC · JPL
411375	2010 VF_{51}	—	November 12, 2001	Socorro	LINEAR	·	2.3 km	MPC · JPL
411376	2010 VH_{53}	—	November 3, 2010	Mount Lemmon	Mount Lemmon Survey	DOR	2.5 km	MPC · JPL
411377	2010 VP_{57}	—	December 9, 2006	Kitt Peak	Spacewatch	·	1.4 km	MPC · JPL
411378	2010 VN_{62}	—	December 12, 2006	Mount Lemmon	Mount Lemmon Survey	·	2.0 km	MPC · JPL
411379	2010 VS_{62}	—	December 24, 2006	Kitt Peak	Spacewatch	·	1.2 km	MPC · JPL
411380	2010 VH_{63}	—	September 20, 2001	Kitt Peak	Spacewatch	·	1.5 km	MPC · JPL
411381	2010 VK_{65}	—	April 24, 2003	Kitt Peak	Spacewatch	·	1.8 km	MPC · JPL
411382	2010 VE_{68}	—	November 11, 2006	Mount Lemmon	Mount Lemmon Survey	(5)	1.1 km	MPC · JPL
411383	2010 VF_{70}	—	November 22, 2006	Kitt Peak	Spacewatch	·	1.2 km	MPC · JPL
411384	2010 VQ_{70}	—	November 5, 2010	Catalina	CSS	·	1.3 km	MPC · JPL
411385	2010 VW_{73}	—	January 24, 2007	Kitt Peak	Spacewatch	AEO	1.0 km	MPC · JPL
411386	2010 VU_{78}	—	November 17, 2006	Mount Lemmon	Mount Lemmon Survey	·	1.2 km	MPC · JPL
411387	2010 VD_{82}	—	October 5, 2005	Mount Lemmon	Mount Lemmon Survey	·	2.0 km	MPC · JPL
411388	2010 VN_{86}	—	November 24, 2006	Mount Lemmon	Mount Lemmon Survey	·	1.4 km	MPC · JPL
411389	2010 VH_{87}	—	October 13, 2010	Mount Lemmon	Mount Lemmon Survey	·	1.3 km	MPC · JPL
411390	2010 VQ_{87}	—	January 10, 2003	Socorro	LINEAR	·	1.4 km	MPC · JPL
411391	2010 VW_{87}	—	September 26, 2005	Kitt Peak	Spacewatch	·	1.7 km	MPC · JPL
411392	2010 VO_{93}	—	November 7, 2010	Mount Lemmon	Mount Lemmon Survey	·	1.7 km	MPC · JPL
411393	2010 VA_{97}	—	November 2, 2010	Mount Lemmon	Mount Lemmon Survey	·	1.5 km	MPC · JPL
411394	2010 VO_{102}	—	January 27, 2007	Kitt Peak	Spacewatch	·	1.5 km	MPC · JPL
411395	2010 VM_{103}	—	November 17, 2001	Kitt Peak	Spacewatch	·	2.5 km	MPC · JPL
411396	2010 VM_{104}	—	October 28, 2010	Mount Lemmon	Mount Lemmon Survey	·	2.5 km	MPC · JPL
411397	2010 VE_{106}	—	April 3, 2008	Mount Lemmon	Mount Lemmon Survey	·	1.5 km	MPC · JPL
411398	2010 VF_{106}	—	October 28, 2010	Mount Lemmon	Mount Lemmon Survey	·	1.8 km	MPC · JPL
411399	2010 VS_{106}	—	October 15, 2001	Socorro	LINEAR	HNS	1.8 km	MPC · JPL
411400	2010 VC_{112}	—	September 5, 2010	Mount Lemmon	Mount Lemmon Survey	(5)	1.2 km	MPC · JPL

== 411401–411500 ==
back to top

Designation			Discovery			Properties		Ref
Permanent	Provisional	Named after	Date	Site	Discoverer(s)	Category	Diam.	Ref
411401	2010 VX_{113}	—	December 26, 2006	Kitt Peak	Spacewatch	·	970 m	MPC · JPL
411402	2010 VY_{115}	—	October 30, 2010	Kitt Peak	Spacewatch	·	2.4 km	MPC · JPL
411403	2010 VK_{116}	—	October 30, 2010	Kitt Peak	Spacewatch	ADE	2.3 km	MPC · JPL
411404	2010 VF_{120}	—	January 10, 2007	Mount Lemmon	Mount Lemmon Survey	·	1.5 km	MPC · JPL
411405	2010 VC_{123}	—	October 29, 2010	Mount Lemmon	Mount Lemmon Survey	·	1.4 km	MPC · JPL
411406	2010 VW_{129}	—	October 17, 2010	Mount Lemmon	Mount Lemmon Survey	·	1.5 km	MPC · JPL
411407	2010 VD_{137}	—	October 19, 2010	Mount Lemmon	Mount Lemmon Survey	·	960 m	MPC · JPL
411408	2010 VK_{141}	—	July 10, 2005	Kitt Peak	Spacewatch	·	1.1 km	MPC · JPL
411409	2010 VF_{153}	—	December 1, 2006	Kitt Peak	Spacewatch	(5)	1.4 km	MPC · JPL
411410	2010 VK_{159}	—	November 8, 2010	Mount Lemmon	Mount Lemmon Survey	·	1.8 km	MPC · JPL
411411	2010 VP_{165}	—	March 31, 2008	Kitt Peak	Spacewatch	·	1.6 km	MPC · JPL
411412	2010 VN_{168}	—	August 24, 2001	Kitt Peak	Spacewatch	·	1.4 km	MPC · JPL
411413	2010 VS_{170}	—	November 1, 2010	Kitt Peak	Spacewatch	·	1.8 km	MPC · JPL
411414	2010 VR_{171}	—	November 1, 2010	Kitt Peak	Spacewatch	·	2.3 km	MPC · JPL
411415	2010 VS_{174}	—	September 11, 2010	Mount Lemmon	Mount Lemmon Survey	·	1.4 km	MPC · JPL
411416	2010 VS_{176}	—	July 11, 2005	Mount Lemmon	Mount Lemmon Survey	·	1.9 km	MPC · JPL
411417	2010 VC_{192}	—	October 30, 2010	Kitt Peak	Spacewatch	·	1.3 km	MPC · JPL
411418	2010 VA_{198}	—	November 2, 2010	Mount Lemmon	Mount Lemmon Survey	·	1.8 km	MPC · JPL
411419	2010 VD_{200}	—	June 30, 2005	Kitt Peak	Spacewatch	·	2.2 km	MPC · JPL
411420	2010 VW_{200}	—	September 30, 1997	Kitt Peak	Spacewatch	·	1.4 km	MPC · JPL
411421	2010 VC_{201}	—	November 12, 2010	Mount Lemmon	Mount Lemmon Survey	·	1.5 km	MPC · JPL
411422	2010 VA_{204}	—	November 14, 2006	Catalina	CSS	·	1.7 km	MPC · JPL
411423	2010 VR_{205}	—	March 8, 2008	Kitt Peak	Spacewatch	WIT	950 m	MPC · JPL
411424	2010 VB_{207}	—	November 20, 2006	Kitt Peak	Spacewatch	·	1.3 km	MPC · JPL
411425	2010 VT_{208}	—	October 17, 2010	Mount Lemmon	Mount Lemmon Survey	·	1.5 km	MPC · JPL
411426	2010 VK_{209}	—	October 4, 2006	Mount Lemmon	Mount Lemmon Survey	·	1.2 km	MPC · JPL
411427	2010 VR_{212}	—	April 3, 2008	Mount Lemmon	Mount Lemmon Survey	MAR	830 m	MPC · JPL
411428	2010 VU_{212}	—	November 17, 2006	Kitt Peak	Spacewatch	MAR	1.6 km	MPC · JPL
411429	2010 WO_{2}	—	March 29, 2008	Kitt Peak	Spacewatch	·	2.0 km	MPC · JPL
411430	2010 WE_{4}	—	April 28, 2004	Kitt Peak	Spacewatch	WIT	960 m	MPC · JPL
411431	2010 WE_{6}	—	September 28, 2006	Mount Lemmon	Mount Lemmon Survey	·	1.1 km	MPC · JPL
411432	2010 WG_{8}	—	October 10, 2005	Catalina	CSS	WAT	2.2 km	MPC · JPL
411433	2010 WO_{13}	—	January 28, 2007	Mount Lemmon	Mount Lemmon Survey	MRX	1.0 km	MPC · JPL
411434	2010 WQ_{16}	—	December 27, 2006	Mount Lemmon	Mount Lemmon Survey	·	1.6 km	MPC · JPL
411435	2010 WT_{16}	—	November 23, 2006	Mount Lemmon	Mount Lemmon Survey	·	2.0 km	MPC · JPL
411436	2010 WY_{18}	—	November 13, 2010	Kitt Peak	Spacewatch	·	1.5 km	MPC · JPL
411437	2010 WK_{31}	—	November 10, 2010	Mount Lemmon	Mount Lemmon Survey	·	1.5 km	MPC · JPL
411438	2010 WG_{35}	—	December 26, 2006	Kitt Peak	Spacewatch	·	2.0 km	MPC · JPL
411439	2010 WW_{35}	—	December 27, 2006	Mount Lemmon	Mount Lemmon Survey	NEM	2.2 km	MPC · JPL
411440	2010 WR_{41}	—	September 19, 2001	Socorro	LINEAR	·	1.6 km	MPC · JPL
411441	2010 WB_{42}	—	October 1, 2005	Mount Lemmon	Mount Lemmon Survey	·	1.8 km	MPC · JPL
411442	2010 WK_{45}	—	October 9, 2005	Kitt Peak	Spacewatch	·	1.8 km	MPC · JPL
411443	2010 WX_{49}	—	October 31, 2010	Kitt Peak	Spacewatch	·	2.1 km	MPC · JPL
411444	2010 WF_{50}	—	November 1, 2010	Kitt Peak	Spacewatch	·	1.7 km	MPC · JPL
411445	2010 WU_{54}	—	October 6, 2005	Kitt Peak	Spacewatch	HOF	2.2 km	MPC · JPL
411446	2010 WM_{55}	—	November 29, 2005	Mount Lemmon	Mount Lemmon Survey	·	2.1 km	MPC · JPL
411447	2010 WF_{60}	—	November 12, 2010	Kitt Peak	Spacewatch	EUN	1.4 km	MPC · JPL
411448	2010 WY_{63}	—	October 24, 2005	Kitt Peak	Spacewatch	·	1.7 km	MPC · JPL
411449	2010 WU_{65}	—	November 28, 2010	Mount Lemmon	Mount Lemmon Survey	·	3.8 km	MPC · JPL
411450	2010 WF_{66}	—	December 27, 2006	Catalina	CSS	·	1.8 km	MPC · JPL
411451	2010 WN_{71}	—	October 23, 2006	Mount Lemmon	Mount Lemmon Survey	·	1.4 km	MPC · JPL
411452	2010 WO_{71}	—	September 26, 2005	Catalina	CSS	·	2.5 km	MPC · JPL
411453	2010 WZ_{72}	—	October 29, 2010	Kitt Peak	Spacewatch	·	1.7 km	MPC · JPL
411454	2010 WK_{73}	—	November 30, 2010	Mount Lemmon	Mount Lemmon Survey	EOS	2.2 km	MPC · JPL
411455	2010 WN_{74}	—	May 4, 2009	Kitt Peak	Spacewatch	EUN	1.4 km	MPC · JPL
411456	2010 WO_{74}	—	June 17, 2010	Mount Lemmon	Mount Lemmon Survey	·	1.7 km	MPC · JPL
411457	2010 XN_{3}	—	November 17, 2006	Kitt Peak	Spacewatch	·	2.4 km	MPC · JPL
411458	2010 XV_{9}	—	November 20, 2006	Kitt Peak	Spacewatch	·	1 km	MPC · JPL
411459	2010 XO_{11}	—	January 19, 2008	Mount Lemmon	Mount Lemmon Survey	·	2.5 km	MPC · JPL
411460	2010 XC_{14}	—	September 18, 2010	Kitt Peak	Spacewatch	·	3.9 km	MPC · JPL
411461	2010 XQ_{19}	—	April 11, 2008	Mount Lemmon	Mount Lemmon Survey	·	1.5 km	MPC · JPL
411462	2010 XO_{22}	—	October 29, 2010	Kitt Peak	Spacewatch	·	2.5 km	MPC · JPL
411463	2010 XU_{28}	—	October 12, 2005	Kitt Peak	Spacewatch	·	1.9 km	MPC · JPL
411464	2010 XE_{30}	—	October 28, 2010	Mount Lemmon	Mount Lemmon Survey	·	1.2 km	MPC · JPL
411465	2010 XU_{38}	—	November 18, 2006	Kitt Peak	Spacewatch	(194)	1.5 km	MPC · JPL
411466	2010 XW_{38}	—	December 15, 2001	Socorro	LINEAR	·	2.5 km	MPC · JPL
411467	2010 XX_{38}	—	December 24, 2006	Kitt Peak	Spacewatch	·	1.2 km	MPC · JPL
411468	2010 XL_{41}	—	December 16, 2006	Kitt Peak	Spacewatch	·	1.4 km	MPC · JPL
411469	2010 XQ_{57}	—	July 10, 2005	Kitt Peak	Spacewatch	·	1.5 km	MPC · JPL
411470	2010 XU_{72}	—	December 10, 2006	Kitt Peak	Spacewatch	·	2.0 km	MPC · JPL
411471	2010 XM_{77}	—	October 6, 2005	Mount Lemmon	Mount Lemmon Survey	·	1.6 km	MPC · JPL
411472	2010 YV_{1}	—	February 27, 2006	Catalina	CSS	·	4.1 km	MPC · JPL
411473	2010 YL_{2}	—	October 26, 2009	Mount Lemmon	Mount Lemmon Survey	·	2.7 km	MPC · JPL
411474	2010 YK_{4}	—	September 17, 2009	Mount Lemmon	Mount Lemmon Survey	VER	3.2 km	MPC · JPL
411475	2011 AC	—	December 13, 1999	Socorro	LINEAR	·	2.6 km	MPC · JPL
411476	2011 AS_{22}	—	September 24, 2009	Catalina	CSS	EOS	2.5 km	MPC · JPL
411477	2011 AF_{26}	—	November 25, 2005	Catalina	CSS	GEF	1.3 km	MPC · JPL
411478	2011 AF_{27}	—	February 25, 2006	Catalina	CSS	·	4.7 km	MPC · JPL
411479	2011 AD_{35}	—	December 17, 2001	Socorro	LINEAR	·	2.3 km	MPC · JPL
411480	2011 AW_{37}	—	December 8, 2010	Mount Lemmon	Mount Lemmon Survey	TEL	1.1 km	MPC · JPL
411481	2011 AP_{38}	—	October 18, 1998	Kitt Peak	Spacewatch	THM	2.3 km	MPC · JPL
411482	2011 AA_{39}	—	December 30, 2005	Kitt Peak	Spacewatch	·	1.8 km	MPC · JPL
411483	2011 AA_{43}	—	November 5, 2010	Mount Lemmon	Mount Lemmon Survey	·	2.4 km	MPC · JPL
411484	2011 AF_{44}	—	October 21, 2009	Mount Lemmon	Mount Lemmon Survey	·	1.7 km	MPC · JPL
411485	2011 AY_{44}	—	October 22, 2009	Mount Lemmon	Mount Lemmon Survey	·	2.3 km	MPC · JPL
411486	2011 AO_{45}	—	March 25, 2007	Mount Lemmon	Mount Lemmon Survey	·	4.8 km	MPC · JPL
411487	2011 AF_{47}	—	April 25, 2007	Kitt Peak	Spacewatch	EOS	2.4 km	MPC · JPL
411488	2011 AV_{48}	—	November 10, 2009	Kitt Peak	Spacewatch	·	2.6 km	MPC · JPL
411489	2011 AJ_{50}	—	December 6, 2010	Mount Lemmon	Mount Lemmon Survey	EOS	1.9 km	MPC · JPL
411490	2011 AG_{52}	—	December 7, 2010	Mount Lemmon	Mount Lemmon Survey	·	2.7 km	MPC · JPL
411491	2011 AR_{54}	—	November 21, 2005	Kitt Peak	Spacewatch	·	1.7 km	MPC · JPL
411492	2011 AW_{59}	—	January 12, 2011	Mount Lemmon	Mount Lemmon Survey	·	2.4 km	MPC · JPL
411493	2011 AX_{59}	—	August 7, 2008	Kitt Peak	Spacewatch	·	2.6 km	MPC · JPL
411494	2011 AQ_{60}	—	December 6, 2010	Mount Lemmon	Mount Lemmon Survey	·	1.8 km	MPC · JPL
411495	2011 AJ_{63}	—	December 9, 2010	Mount Lemmon	Mount Lemmon Survey	·	3.1 km	MPC · JPL
411496	2011 AK_{63}	—	September 18, 2003	Kitt Peak	Spacewatch	·	2.5 km	MPC · JPL
411497	2011 AG_{70}	—	January 13, 2011	Mount Lemmon	Mount Lemmon Survey	EOS	2.2 km	MPC · JPL
411498	2011 AW_{72}	—	December 10, 2010	Mount Lemmon	Mount Lemmon Survey	·	2.2 km	MPC · JPL
411499	2011 AB_{73}	—	January 17, 2007	Catalina	CSS	·	1.6 km	MPC · JPL
411500	2011 AJ_{73}	—	November 24, 2006	Mount Lemmon	Mount Lemmon Survey	·	1.0 km	MPC · JPL

== 411501–411600 ==
back to top

Designation			Discovery			Properties		Ref
Permanent	Provisional	Named after	Date	Site	Discoverer(s)	Category	Diam.	Ref
411501	2011 AN_{73}	—	July 29, 2008	Mount Lemmon	Mount Lemmon Survey	EOS	2.5 km	MPC · JPL
411502	2011 AV_{76}	—	November 7, 2010	Mount Lemmon	Mount Lemmon Survey	·	2.8 km	MPC · JPL
411503	2011 AK_{77}	—	January 10, 2011	Catalina	CSS	·	3.3 km	MPC · JPL
411504	2011 AK_{78}	—	February 3, 2000	Kitt Peak	Spacewatch	HYG	2.5 km	MPC · JPL
411505	2011 BU_{6}	—	December 11, 2001	Socorro	LINEAR	·	1.2 km	MPC · JPL
411506	2011 BY_{8}	—	December 13, 1999	Kitt Peak	Spacewatch	·	2.4 km	MPC · JPL
411507	2011 BT_{10}	—	December 16, 2004	Socorro	LINEAR	LIX	3.9 km	MPC · JPL
411508	2011 BT_{13}	—	January 27, 2006	Mount Lemmon	Mount Lemmon Survey	·	1.9 km	MPC · JPL
411509	2011 BG_{15}	—	January 18, 2010	WISE	WISE	·	3.5 km	MPC · JPL
411510	2011 BR_{18}	—	October 15, 1993	Kitt Peak	Spacewatch	·	2.2 km	MPC · JPL
411511	2011 BN_{22}	—	November 9, 2009	Catalina	CSS	·	2.5 km	MPC · JPL
411512	2011 BX_{26}	—	January 14, 2011	Kitt Peak	Spacewatch	·	3.7 km	MPC · JPL
411513	2011 BA_{33}	—	January 16, 2000	Kitt Peak	Spacewatch	·	1.9 km	MPC · JPL
411514	2011 BZ_{36}	—	July 30, 2008	Mount Lemmon	Mount Lemmon Survey	VER	2.8 km	MPC · JPL
411515	2011 BA_{38}	—	January 28, 2011	Mount Lemmon	Mount Lemmon Survey	VER	2.8 km	MPC · JPL
411516	2011 BL_{38}	—	September 4, 2008	Kitt Peak	Spacewatch	·	3.6 km	MPC · JPL
411517	2011 BT_{42}	—	November 23, 2009	Mount Lemmon	Mount Lemmon Survey	·	2.5 km	MPC · JPL
411518	2011 BS_{47}	—	March 5, 1997	Kitt Peak	Spacewatch	·	2.1 km	MPC · JPL
411519	2011 BA_{49}	—	February 24, 2006	Kitt Peak	Spacewatch	·	1.8 km	MPC · JPL
411520	2011 BF_{51}	—	December 15, 2004	Kitt Peak	Spacewatch	HYG	3.2 km	MPC · JPL
411521	2011 BZ_{55}	—	January 14, 2011	Kitt Peak	Spacewatch	·	2.0 km	MPC · JPL
411522	2011 BJ_{56}	—	December 5, 2010	Mount Lemmon	Mount Lemmon Survey	·	3.0 km	MPC · JPL
411523	2011 BR_{78}	—	October 4, 2003	Kitt Peak	Spacewatch	·	3.4 km	MPC · JPL
411524	2011 BZ_{80}	—	January 26, 2006	Kitt Peak	Spacewatch	·	2.3 km	MPC · JPL
411525	2011 BV_{81}	—	December 17, 1999	Kitt Peak	Spacewatch	·	2.9 km	MPC · JPL
411526	2011 BY_{81}	—	March 25, 2006	Mount Lemmon	Mount Lemmon Survey	·	3.5 km	MPC · JPL
411527	2011 BZ_{82}	—	November 25, 2005	Catalina	CSS	·	2.1 km	MPC · JPL
411528	2011 BF_{89}	—	April 24, 2007	Mount Lemmon	Mount Lemmon Survey	·	2.3 km	MPC · JPL
411529	2011 BD_{92}	—	December 11, 2004	Kitt Peak	Spacewatch	·	3.2 km	MPC · JPL
411530	2011 BX_{93}	—	September 3, 2008	Kitt Peak	Spacewatch	·	3.3 km	MPC · JPL
411531	2011 BD_{96}	—	October 2, 2009	Mount Lemmon	Mount Lemmon Survey	NAE	2.9 km	MPC · JPL
411532	2011 BK_{101}	—	January 25, 2010	WISE	WISE	VER	2.8 km	MPC · JPL
411533	2011 BX_{102}	—	January 8, 2011	Mount Lemmon	Mount Lemmon Survey	·	3.0 km	MPC · JPL
411534	2011 BM_{107}	—	November 16, 2009	Kitt Peak	Spacewatch	CYB	2.7 km	MPC · JPL
411535	2011 BQ_{114}	—	October 2, 2009	Mount Lemmon	Mount Lemmon Survey	EOS	1.9 km	MPC · JPL
411536	2011 BS_{114}	—	January 27, 2000	Kitt Peak	Spacewatch	(31811)	2.7 km	MPC · JPL
411537	2011 BF_{115}	—	December 5, 2010	Mount Lemmon	Mount Lemmon Survey	·	4.2 km	MPC · JPL
411538	2011 BR_{116}	—	October 26, 2005	Kitt Peak	Spacewatch	AEO	1.2 km	MPC · JPL
411539	2011 BW_{119}	—	November 1, 2010	Mount Lemmon	Mount Lemmon Survey	GEF	1.5 km	MPC · JPL
411540	2011 BK_{122}	—	January 10, 2011	Kitt Peak	Spacewatch	·	3.7 km	MPC · JPL
411541	2011 BM_{124}	—	September 2, 2008	Kitt Peak	Spacewatch	·	2.8 km	MPC · JPL
411542	2011 BQ_{136}	—	January 8, 2011	Mount Lemmon	Mount Lemmon Survey	·	2.4 km	MPC · JPL
411543	2011 BK_{143}	—	December 8, 2010	Mount Lemmon	Mount Lemmon Survey	·	2.8 km	MPC · JPL
411544	2011 CW_{1}	—	March 30, 2000	Kitt Peak	Spacewatch	·	2.8 km	MPC · JPL
411545	2011 CD_{5}	—	January 8, 2006	Mount Lemmon	Mount Lemmon Survey	·	2.2 km	MPC · JPL
411546	2011 CQ_{6}	—	November 11, 2009	Kitt Peak	Spacewatch	·	3.0 km	MPC · JPL
411547	2011 CX_{13}	—	October 4, 1996	Kitt Peak	Spacewatch	·	4.8 km	MPC · JPL
411548	2011 CE_{15}	—	January 14, 2011	Kitt Peak	Spacewatch	·	3.2 km	MPC · JPL
411549	2011 CV_{30}	—	February 2, 2006	Kitt Peak	Spacewatch	·	2.9 km	MPC · JPL
411550	2011 CB_{43}	—	December 8, 2005	Kitt Peak	Spacewatch	·	2.3 km	MPC · JPL
411551	2011 CF_{44}	—	September 10, 2004	Kitt Peak	Spacewatch	·	2.3 km	MPC · JPL
411552	2011 CE_{47}	—	October 5, 2000	Kitt Peak	Spacewatch	(18466)	3.0 km	MPC · JPL
411553	2011 CD_{51}	—	March 14, 2007	Catalina	CSS	·	1.7 km	MPC · JPL
411554	2011 CX_{58}	—	February 1, 2000	Kitt Peak	Spacewatch	THM	2.3 km	MPC · JPL
411555	2011 CA_{60}	—	February 2, 2006	Kitt Peak	Spacewatch	·	2.3 km	MPC · JPL
411556	2011 CA_{64}	—	April 2, 2006	Kitt Peak	Spacewatch	THM	2.1 km	MPC · JPL
411557	2011 CC_{70}	—	December 1, 2010	Catalina	CSS	·	4.1 km	MPC · JPL
411558	2011 CF_{74}	—	January 8, 2006	Mount Lemmon	Mount Lemmon Survey	·	2.0 km	MPC · JPL
411559	2011 CH_{75}	—	September 20, 2003	Kitt Peak	Spacewatch	·	3.7 km	MPC · JPL
411560	2011 CK_{76}	—	October 1, 2009	Mount Lemmon	Mount Lemmon Survey	LIX	3.8 km	MPC · JPL
411561	2011 CV_{78}	—	May 21, 2006	Kitt Peak	Spacewatch	·	3.1 km	MPC · JPL
411562	2011 CN_{79}	—	September 26, 1995	Kitt Peak	Spacewatch	GEF	1.1 km	MPC · JPL
411563	2011 CJ_{87}	—	December 12, 2004	Kitt Peak	Spacewatch	·	3.1 km	MPC · JPL
411564	2011 CG_{101}	—	October 24, 2009	Kitt Peak	Spacewatch	HYG	2.6 km	MPC · JPL
411565	2011 CR_{105}	—	January 18, 2005	Kitt Peak	Spacewatch	·	2.7 km	MPC · JPL
411566	2011 CE_{109}	—	December 20, 2004	Mount Lemmon	Mount Lemmon Survey	·	4.0 km	MPC · JPL
411567	2011 CV_{110}	—	September 6, 2008	Mount Lemmon	Mount Lemmon Survey	·	3.0 km	MPC · JPL
411568	2011 DA_{22}	—	April 2, 2006	Anderson Mesa	LONEOS	·	3.6 km	MPC · JPL
411569	2011 DD_{48}	—	March 14, 2000	Kitt Peak	Spacewatch	LIX	3.1 km	MPC · JPL
411570	2011 DM_{48}	—	October 21, 2003	Kitt Peak	Spacewatch	·	2.6 km	MPC · JPL
411571	2011 DS_{49}	—	February 9, 2005	Mount Lemmon	Mount Lemmon Survey	·	4.8 km	MPC · JPL
411572	2011 DE_{50}	—	November 1, 2000	Socorro	LINEAR	·	2.8 km	MPC · JPL
411573	2011 DG_{50}	—	April 3, 2000	Kitt Peak	Spacewatch	·	3.2 km	MPC · JPL
411574	2011 DH_{51}	—	September 27, 2003	Kitt Peak	Spacewatch	TIR	3.4 km	MPC · JPL
411575	2011 ED_{7}	—	January 28, 2011	Mount Lemmon	Mount Lemmon Survey	·	3.1 km	MPC · JPL
411576	2011 EU_{8}	—	October 15, 2009	Catalina	CSS	·	2.6 km	MPC · JPL
411577	2011 EG_{11}	—	April 24, 2006	Anderson Mesa	LONEOS	·	3.0 km	MPC · JPL
411578	2011 ED_{16}	—	November 19, 2009	Mount Lemmon	Mount Lemmon Survey	·	1.8 km	MPC · JPL
411579	2011 EM_{17}	—	September 21, 2003	Kitt Peak	Spacewatch	·	3.6 km	MPC · JPL
411580	2011 EO_{19}	—	February 25, 2006	Mount Lemmon	Mount Lemmon Survey	EMA	3.2 km	MPC · JPL
411581	2011 EP_{21}	—	December 12, 2004	Kitt Peak	Spacewatch	·	3.4 km	MPC · JPL
411582	2011 EO_{26}	—	October 12, 2009	Mount Lemmon	Mount Lemmon Survey	·	3.0 km	MPC · JPL
411583	2011 EN_{36}	—	March 3, 2005	Kitt Peak	Spacewatch	·	2.6 km	MPC · JPL
411584	2011 ES_{41}	—	October 24, 2003	Socorro	LINEAR	·	4.6 km	MPC · JPL
411585	2011 EF_{50}	—	November 15, 2003	Kitt Peak	Spacewatch	·	4.0 km	MPC · JPL
411586	2011 ED_{58}	—	January 8, 2010	Kitt Peak	Spacewatch	CYB	3.7 km	MPC · JPL
411587	2011 EY_{58}	—	November 26, 2003	Kitt Peak	Spacewatch	·	3.1 km	MPC · JPL
411588	2011 EJ_{63}	—	September 30, 2009	Mount Lemmon	Mount Lemmon Survey	LIX	3.8 km	MPC · JPL
411589	2011 EE_{71}	—	November 23, 2009	Catalina	CSS	·	3.0 km	MPC · JPL
411590	2011 EY_{73}	—	November 21, 2005	Kitt Peak	Spacewatch	·	2.2 km	MPC · JPL
411591	2011 EQ_{76}	—	January 15, 2005	Kitt Peak	Spacewatch	LIX	3.8 km	MPC · JPL
411592	2011 ED_{77}	—	February 11, 2010	WISE	WISE	(895)	5.4 km	MPC · JPL
411593	2011 FU	—	October 2, 2008	Catalina	CSS	·	4.1 km	MPC · JPL
411594	2011 FQ_{4}	—	March 9, 2005	Mount Lemmon	Mount Lemmon Survey	EOS	2.5 km	MPC · JPL
411595	2011 FA_{15}	—	September 27, 1998	Kitt Peak	Spacewatch	·	2.7 km	MPC · JPL
411596	2011 FM_{62}	—	December 21, 2004	Catalina	CSS	·	2.9 km	MPC · JPL
411597	2011 FU_{73}	—	March 2, 2010	WISE	WISE	·	3.6 km	MPC · JPL
411598	2011 FU_{94}	—	September 27, 2003	Kitt Peak	Spacewatch	·	2.4 km	MPC · JPL
411599	2011 FA_{127}	—	January 31, 2010	WISE	WISE	EUP	4.5 km	MPC · JPL
411600	2011 FK_{130}	—	December 14, 2004	Kitt Peak	Spacewatch	·	2.2 km	MPC · JPL

== 411601–411700 ==
back to top

Designation			Discovery			Properties		Ref
Permanent	Provisional	Named after	Date	Site	Discoverer(s)	Category	Diam.	Ref
411601	2011 FE_{154}	—	November 23, 2006	Kitt Peak	Spacewatch	·	740 m	MPC · JPL
411602	2011 GY_{45}	—	October 6, 2008	Mount Lemmon	Mount Lemmon Survey	·	3.6 km	MPC · JPL
411603	2011 GT_{59}	—	October 20, 2003	Kitt Peak	Spacewatch	·	3.5 km	MPC · JPL
411604	2011 GD_{75}	—	September 23, 2008	Mount Lemmon	Mount Lemmon Survey	·	3.1 km	MPC · JPL
411605	2011 GA_{77}	—	September 24, 2008	Kitt Peak	Spacewatch	·	3.0 km	MPC · JPL
411606	2011 GP_{86}	—	February 28, 2010	WISE	WISE	·	4.0 km	MPC · JPL
411607	2011 HZ_{85}	—	April 29, 2006	Kitt Peak	Spacewatch	·	2.4 km	MPC · JPL
411608	2011 JU_{24}	—	April 8, 2011	Kitt Peak	Spacewatch	·	3.7 km	MPC · JPL
411609	2011 JF_{27}	—	November 4, 2007	Mount Lemmon	Mount Lemmon Survey	H	510 m	MPC · JPL
411610	2011 OM_{59}	—	October 22, 2003	Kitt Peak	Spacewatch	·	2.1 km	MPC · JPL
411611	2011 QF_{14}	—	August 22, 2011	La Sagra	OAM	AMO	360 m	MPC · JPL
411612	2011 QE_{31}	—	May 15, 2010	WISE	WISE	·	3.1 km	MPC · JPL
411613	2011 SZ_{84}	—	September 21, 2011	Kitt Peak	Spacewatch	·	1.1 km	MPC · JPL
411614	2011 SU_{105}	—	November 21, 2008	Mount Lemmon	Mount Lemmon Survey	·	550 m	MPC · JPL
411615	2011 SN_{141}	—	September 18, 1995	Kitt Peak	Spacewatch	·	470 m	MPC · JPL
411616	2011 SK_{142}	—	September 21, 2011	Kitt Peak	Spacewatch	·	790 m	MPC · JPL
411617	2011 SN_{183}	—	October 29, 2005	Kitt Peak	Spacewatch	·	780 m	MPC · JPL
411618	2011 SB_{188}	—	September 22, 2011	Kitt Peak	Spacewatch	·	700 m	MPC · JPL
411619	2011 UA_{8}	—	December 22, 2008	Kitt Peak	Spacewatch	·	390 m	MPC · JPL
411620	2011 UJ_{27}	—	March 16, 2010	Catalina	CSS	PHO	1.0 km	MPC · JPL
411621	2011 UZ_{29}	—	October 18, 2011	Mount Lemmon	Mount Lemmon Survey	·	560 m	MPC · JPL
411622	2011 UE_{37}	—	February 2, 2009	Kitt Peak	Spacewatch	·	620 m	MPC · JPL
411623	2011 UM_{38}	—	December 5, 2005	Kitt Peak	Spacewatch	·	770 m	MPC · JPL
411624	2011 UQ_{56}	—	February 2, 2006	Mount Lemmon	Mount Lemmon Survey	·	840 m	MPC · JPL
411625	2011 US_{61}	—	November 17, 2001	Socorro	LINEAR	·	590 m	MPC · JPL
411626	2011 UW_{72}	—	October 18, 2011	Mount Lemmon	Mount Lemmon Survey	·	890 m	MPC · JPL
411627	2011 UV_{79}	—	October 19, 2011	Kitt Peak	Spacewatch	·	620 m	MPC · JPL
411628	2011 UW_{89}	—	October 21, 2011	Mount Lemmon	Mount Lemmon Survey	PHO	960 m	MPC · JPL
411629	2011 UW_{113}	—	May 4, 2010	Catalina	CSS	·	890 m	MPC · JPL
411630	2011 UW_{134}	—	December 30, 2008	Mount Lemmon	Mount Lemmon Survey	·	1.0 km	MPC · JPL
411631	2011 UD_{156}	—	December 31, 2008	Kitt Peak	Spacewatch	·	720 m	MPC · JPL
411632	2011 UY_{162}	—	December 30, 2008	Mount Lemmon	Mount Lemmon Survey	·	670 m	MPC · JPL
411633	2011 UJ_{187}	—	November 24, 2008	Mount Lemmon	Mount Lemmon Survey	·	1.0 km	MPC · JPL
411634	2011 UM_{202}	—	December 14, 2004	Kitt Peak	Spacewatch	V	700 m	MPC · JPL
411635	2011 UQ_{231}	—	March 13, 2010	Kitt Peak	Spacewatch	·	590 m	MPC · JPL
411636	2011 UZ_{245}	—	October 26, 2011	Kitt Peak	Spacewatch	·	590 m	MPC · JPL
411637	2011 UO_{246}	—	September 23, 2011	Kitt Peak	Spacewatch	·	680 m	MPC · JPL
411638	2011 UH_{247}	—	January 26, 2006	Kitt Peak	Spacewatch	·	660 m	MPC · JPL
411639	2011 UW_{261}	—	October 16, 2007	Mount Lemmon	Mount Lemmon Survey	V	550 m	MPC · JPL
411640	2011 UY_{268}	—	September 21, 2011	Kitt Peak	Spacewatch	·	590 m	MPC · JPL
411641	2011 UB_{269}	—	October 19, 2011	Kitt Peak	Spacewatch	·	630 m	MPC · JPL
411642	2011 UE_{279}	—	December 30, 2008	Kitt Peak	Spacewatch	·	570 m	MPC · JPL
411643	2011 UW_{292}	—	December 30, 2008	Mount Lemmon	Mount Lemmon Survey	·	1.0 km	MPC · JPL
411644	2011 UP_{296}	—	January 7, 2006	Kitt Peak	Spacewatch	·	630 m	MPC · JPL
411645	2011 UH_{311}	—	March 31, 2010	WISE	WISE	ADE	3.5 km	MPC · JPL
411646	2011 UX_{321}	—	October 31, 2011	XuYi	PMO NEO Survey Program	·	1 km	MPC · JPL
411647	2011 US_{347}	—	September 29, 2011	Kitt Peak	Spacewatch	·	630 m	MPC · JPL
411648	2011 US_{349}	—	January 17, 2009	Catalina	CSS	·	690 m	MPC · JPL
411649	2011 US_{351}	—	September 20, 2011	Mount Lemmon	Mount Lemmon Survey	·	760 m	MPC · JPL
411650	2011 UW_{358}	—	December 22, 2008	Catalina	CSS	·	990 m	MPC · JPL
411651	2011 UU_{359}	—	February 27, 2006	Kitt Peak	Spacewatch	·	860 m	MPC · JPL
411652	2011 VX_{11}	—	December 31, 2008	Kitt Peak	Spacewatch	·	620 m	MPC · JPL
411653	2011 VC_{14}	—	December 10, 2004	Kitt Peak	Spacewatch	NYS	1.0 km	MPC · JPL
411654	2011 VG_{20}	—	May 12, 2010	Kitt Peak	Spacewatch	·	800 m	MPC · JPL
411655	2011 WW_{4}	—	August 1, 1995	Kitt Peak	Spacewatch	AMO	690 m	MPC · JPL
411656	2011 WR_{8}	—	December 22, 2008	Mount Lemmon	Mount Lemmon Survey	·	590 m	MPC · JPL
411657	2011 WG_{15}	—	May 4, 2009	Mount Lemmon	Mount Lemmon Survey	ARM	4.1 km	MPC · JPL
411658	2011 WD_{19}	—	November 17, 2011	Kitt Peak	Spacewatch	·	900 m	MPC · JPL
411659	2011 WL_{19}	—	November 17, 2011	Kitt Peak	Spacewatch	·	1.0 km	MPC · JPL
411660	2011 WE_{21}	—	October 11, 2007	Kitt Peak	Spacewatch	·	1.3 km	MPC · JPL
411661	2011 WM_{29}	—	October 15, 2007	Mount Lemmon	Mount Lemmon Survey	·	800 m	MPC · JPL
411662	2011 WJ_{48}	—	March 9, 2005	Kitt Peak	Spacewatch	·	960 m	MPC · JPL
411663	2011 WC_{59}	—	September 22, 2001	Kitt Peak	Spacewatch	·	530 m	MPC · JPL
411664	2011 WJ_{61}	—	November 30, 2008	Mount Lemmon	Mount Lemmon Survey	·	790 m	MPC · JPL
411665	2011 WL_{63}	—	January 30, 2009	Mount Lemmon	Mount Lemmon Survey	·	800 m	MPC · JPL
411666	2011 WC_{67}	—	September 17, 2004	Anderson Mesa	LONEOS	·	860 m	MPC · JPL
411667	2011 WZ_{68}	—	October 2, 2000	Anderson Mesa	LONEOS	·	1.1 km	MPC · JPL
411668	2011 WQ_{71}	—	November 20, 2004	Kitt Peak	Spacewatch	·	820 m	MPC · JPL
411669	2011 WA_{80}	—	October 30, 2011	Mount Lemmon	Mount Lemmon Survey	·	810 m	MPC · JPL
411670	2011 WR_{86}	—	January 22, 2006	Mount Lemmon	Mount Lemmon Survey	·	570 m	MPC · JPL
411671	2011 WZ_{97}	—	November 24, 2008	Mount Lemmon	Mount Lemmon Survey	·	610 m	MPC · JPL
411672	2011 WR_{102}	—	August 10, 2004	Socorro	LINEAR	·	620 m	MPC · JPL
411673	2011 WQ_{105}	—	December 22, 2008	Kitt Peak	Spacewatch	·	470 m	MPC · JPL
411674	2011 WP_{112}	—	October 28, 2011	Mount Lemmon	Mount Lemmon Survey	·	710 m	MPC · JPL
411675	2011 WG_{116}	—	October 15, 1995	Kitt Peak	Spacewatch	·	680 m	MPC · JPL
411676	2011 WS_{120}	—	January 18, 2009	Catalina	CSS	·	700 m	MPC · JPL
411677	2011 WZ_{134}	—	March 2, 2009	Mount Lemmon	Mount Lemmon Survey	·	1.0 km	MPC · JPL
411678	2011 WK_{137}	—	December 5, 2007	Kitt Peak	Spacewatch	·	1.3 km	MPC · JPL
411679	2011 YT_{1}	—	October 19, 2007	Mount Lemmon	Mount Lemmon Survey	·	910 m	MPC · JPL
411680	2011 YK_{8}	—	February 20, 2009	Mount Lemmon	Mount Lemmon Survey	·	1.3 km	MPC · JPL
411681	2011 YJ_{11}	—	January 29, 2009	Mount Lemmon	Mount Lemmon Survey	·	830 m	MPC · JPL
411682	2011 YT_{16}	—	September 9, 2007	Kitt Peak	Spacewatch	·	800 m	MPC · JPL
411683	2011 YC_{17}	—	February 1, 2005	Kitt Peak	Spacewatch	NYS	930 m	MPC · JPL
411684	2011 YQ_{23}	—	December 19, 2004	Mount Lemmon	Mount Lemmon Survey	·	1.3 km	MPC · JPL
411685	2011 YO_{25}	—	December 24, 2011	Catalina	CSS	·	2.8 km	MPC · JPL
411686	2011 YW_{25}	—	April 4, 2005	Catalina	CSS	·	1.5 km	MPC · JPL
411687	2011 YZ_{25}	—	December 25, 2011	Kitt Peak	Spacewatch	·	1.1 km	MPC · JPL
411688	2011 YT_{31}	—	February 4, 2005	Mount Lemmon	Mount Lemmon Survey	·	940 m	MPC · JPL
411689	2011 YW_{33}	—	February 2, 2009	Kitt Peak	Spacewatch	·	750 m	MPC · JPL
411690	2011 YN_{35}	—	December 26, 2011	Kitt Peak	Spacewatch	·	2.9 km	MPC · JPL
411691	2011 YG_{37}	—	December 26, 2011	Kitt Peak	Spacewatch	·	1.6 km	MPC · JPL
411692	2011 YV_{40}	—	January 18, 2008	Mount Lemmon	Mount Lemmon Survey	·	1.1 km	MPC · JPL
411693	2011 YD_{41}	—	April 30, 2006	Kitt Peak	Spacewatch	·	630 m	MPC · JPL
411694	2011 YS_{41}	—	May 6, 2006	Mount Lemmon	Mount Lemmon Survey	V	730 m	MPC · JPL
411695	2011 YB_{49}	—	January 19, 2005	Kitt Peak	Spacewatch	·	1.2 km	MPC · JPL
411696	2011 YR_{50}	—	March 11, 2005	Mount Lemmon	Mount Lemmon Survey	NYS	1.3 km	MPC · JPL
411697	2011 YH_{51}	—	January 19, 2008	Mount Lemmon	Mount Lemmon Survey	·	1.3 km	MPC · JPL
411698	2011 YM_{53}	—	November 19, 2003	Kitt Peak	Spacewatch	MAS	720 m	MPC · JPL
411699	2011 YM_{57}	—	January 3, 2001	Kitt Peak	Spacewatch	·	1.1 km	MPC · JPL
411700	2011 YV_{57}	—	March 12, 2008	Mount Lemmon	Mount Lemmon Survey	·	2.6 km	MPC · JPL

== 411701–411800 ==
back to top

Designation			Discovery			Properties		Ref
Permanent	Provisional	Named after	Date	Site	Discoverer(s)	Category	Diam.	Ref
411701	2011 YH_{60}	—	November 19, 2007	Kitt Peak	Spacewatch	CLA	1.4 km	MPC · JPL
411702	2011 YO_{60}	—	September 17, 2006	Kitt Peak	Spacewatch	·	1.1 km	MPC · JPL
411703	2011 YT_{67}	—	October 21, 2006	Kitt Peak	Spacewatch	·	1.4 km	MPC · JPL
411704	2011 YU_{67}	—	April 18, 2009	Kitt Peak	Spacewatch	·	1.4 km	MPC · JPL
411705	2011 YN_{69}	—	April 16, 2004	Siding Spring	SSS	·	2.0 km	MPC · JPL
411706	2011 YS_{69}	—	March 1, 2005	Catalina	CSS	·	1.4 km	MPC · JPL
411707	2011 YB_{70}	—	May 2, 2008	Siding Spring	SSS	·	2.3 km	MPC · JPL
411708	2011 YR_{78}	—	December 16, 2007	Kitt Peak	Spacewatch	·	1.3 km	MPC · JPL
411709	2011 YU_{78}	—	October 30, 1999	Kitt Peak	Spacewatch	·	1.2 km	MPC · JPL
411710	2012 AQ_{2}	—	October 10, 2007	Mount Lemmon	Mount Lemmon Survey	·	680 m	MPC · JPL
411711	2012 AX_{4}	—	January 1, 2008	Mount Lemmon	Mount Lemmon Survey	PHO	1.4 km	MPC · JPL
411712	2012 AK_{8}	—	November 14, 2007	Kitt Peak	Spacewatch	MAS	670 m	MPC · JPL
411713	2012 AY_{18}	—	November 18, 2006	Mount Lemmon	Mount Lemmon Survey	·	2.4 km	MPC · JPL
411714	2012 AU_{20}	—	October 18, 2007	Kitt Peak	Spacewatch	MAS	630 m	MPC · JPL
411715	2012 AU_{23}	—	November 6, 2007	Mount Lemmon	Mount Lemmon Survey	·	1.4 km	MPC · JPL
411716	2012 BE_{4}	—	January 10, 2008	Mount Lemmon	Mount Lemmon Survey	·	1.5 km	MPC · JPL
411717 Cherylreed	2012 BL_{8}	Cherylreed	February 12, 2004	Kitt Peak	Spacewatch	·	1.3 km	MPC · JPL
411718	2012 BP_{14}	—	August 12, 2010	Kitt Peak	Spacewatch	V	810 m	MPC · JPL
411719	2012 BU_{14}	—	November 18, 2007	Mount Lemmon	Mount Lemmon Survey	MAS	610 m	MPC · JPL
411720	2012 BS_{15}	—	October 2, 2003	Kitt Peak	Spacewatch	·	1.2 km	MPC · JPL
411721	2012 BL_{19}	—	September 11, 2007	Mount Lemmon	Mount Lemmon Survey	·	970 m	MPC · JPL
411722	2012 BC_{21}	—	September 2, 2010	Mount Lemmon	Mount Lemmon Survey	·	1.3 km	MPC · JPL
411723	2012 BM_{21}	—	February 20, 2001	Kitt Peak	Spacewatch	MAS	770 m	MPC · JPL
411724	2012 BK_{26}	—	October 30, 2010	Catalina	CSS	·	2.4 km	MPC · JPL
411725	2012 BH_{28}	—	December 16, 2007	Kitt Peak	Spacewatch	·	2.8 km	MPC · JPL
411726	2012 BQ_{29}	—	February 23, 2001	Kitt Peak	Spacewatch	NYS	1.0 km	MPC · JPL
411727	2012 BG_{38}	—	March 11, 2005	Mount Lemmon	Mount Lemmon Survey	NYS	1.0 km	MPC · JPL
411728	2012 BT_{41}	—	November 20, 2007	Mount Lemmon	Mount Lemmon Survey	·	1.1 km	MPC · JPL
411729	2012 BU_{51}	—	October 14, 2001	Apache Point	SDSS	·	1.6 km	MPC · JPL
411730	2012 BA_{52}	—	November 7, 2007	Mount Lemmon	Mount Lemmon Survey	·	1.1 km	MPC · JPL
411731	2012 BN_{52}	—	September 26, 2006	Mount Lemmon	Mount Lemmon Survey	·	1.2 km	MPC · JPL
411732	2012 BE_{54}	—	November 11, 2007	Mount Lemmon	Mount Lemmon Survey	NYS	1.2 km	MPC · JPL
411733	2012 BK_{54}	—	January 16, 2001	Kitt Peak	Spacewatch	V	780 m	MPC · JPL
411734	2012 BP_{55}	—	August 30, 2005	Kitt Peak	Spacewatch	·	2.0 km	MPC · JPL
411735	2012 BE_{56}	—	April 30, 2008	Kitt Peak	Spacewatch	·	1.9 km	MPC · JPL
411736	2012 BF_{56}	—	October 1, 2005	Mount Lemmon	Mount Lemmon Survey	·	2.0 km	MPC · JPL
411737	2012 BA_{69}	—	May 20, 2005	Mount Lemmon	Mount Lemmon Survey	·	1.1 km	MPC · JPL
411738	2012 BB_{70}	—	April 2, 2005	Kitt Peak	Spacewatch	(6769)	1.2 km	MPC · JPL
411739	2012 BG_{70}	—	April 7, 2005	Kitt Peak	Spacewatch	MAS	770 m	MPC · JPL
411740	2012 BV_{72}	—	December 27, 2011	Mount Lemmon	Mount Lemmon Survey	·	2.5 km	MPC · JPL
411741	2012 BV_{82}	—	December 19, 2003	Kitt Peak	Spacewatch	·	1.6 km	MPC · JPL
411742	2012 BY_{83}	—	October 31, 2010	Mount Lemmon	Mount Lemmon Survey	·	2.8 km	MPC · JPL
411743	2012 BN_{87}	—	August 10, 2010	Kitt Peak	Spacewatch	NYS	1.6 km	MPC · JPL
411744	2012 BF_{88}	—	February 13, 2004	Kitt Peak	Spacewatch	·	1.1 km	MPC · JPL
411745	2012 BM_{89}	—	November 13, 2007	Kitt Peak	Spacewatch	·	1.0 km	MPC · JPL
411746	2012 BM_{94}	—	September 30, 2003	Kitt Peak	Spacewatch	MAS	640 m	MPC · JPL
411747	2012 BG_{95}	—	January 29, 2009	Mount Lemmon	Mount Lemmon Survey	·	840 m	MPC · JPL
411748	2012 BA_{96}	—	December 16, 2007	Kitt Peak	Spacewatch	BRG	1.5 km	MPC · JPL
411749	2012 BM_{100}	—	December 20, 2004	Mount Lemmon	Mount Lemmon Survey	·	600 m	MPC · JPL
411750	2012 BE_{104}	—	February 2, 2000	Socorro	LINEAR	·	1.1 km	MPC · JPL
411751	2012 BH_{107}	—	January 29, 1995	Kitt Peak	Spacewatch	·	2.7 km	MPC · JPL
411752	2012 BS_{108}	—	September 27, 2003	Kitt Peak	Spacewatch	NYS	870 m	MPC · JPL
411753	2012 BT_{108}	—	October 22, 2006	Kitt Peak	Spacewatch	(5)	1.1 km	MPC · JPL
411754	2012 BA_{109}	—	November 13, 2007	Mount Lemmon	Mount Lemmon Survey	·	2.0 km	MPC · JPL
411755	2012 BD_{109}	—	December 13, 2006	Mount Lemmon	Mount Lemmon Survey	HOF	2.3 km	MPC · JPL
411756	2012 BR_{109}	—	November 19, 2003	Socorro	LINEAR	·	1.4 km	MPC · JPL
411757	2012 BT_{109}	—	January 18, 2012	Kitt Peak	Spacewatch	ADE	2.5 km	MPC · JPL
411758	2012 BV_{109}	—	December 1, 2003	Kitt Peak	Spacewatch	·	2.4 km	MPC · JPL
411759	2012 BP_{110}	—	October 29, 2010	Kitt Peak	Spacewatch	·	1.8 km	MPC · JPL
411760	2012 BB_{120}	—	January 12, 2008	Kitt Peak	Spacewatch	·	1.1 km	MPC · JPL
411761	2012 BB_{122}	—	January 30, 2012	Kitt Peak	Spacewatch	·	2.4 km	MPC · JPL
411762	2012 BZ_{124}	—	November 23, 2006	Mount Lemmon	Mount Lemmon Survey	·	1.4 km	MPC · JPL
411763	2012 BV_{126}	—	February 17, 2007	Kitt Peak	Spacewatch	·	2.1 km	MPC · JPL
411764	2012 BT_{128}	—	November 16, 1998	Kitt Peak	Spacewatch	·	1.2 km	MPC · JPL
411765	2012 BV_{129}	—	November 19, 2003	Socorro	LINEAR	·	1.6 km	MPC · JPL
411766	2012 BJ_{130}	—	October 8, 2010	Kitt Peak	Spacewatch	·	1.1 km	MPC · JPL
411767	2012 BN_{132}	—	March 30, 2008	Catalina	CSS	EUN	1.5 km	MPC · JPL
411768	2012 BW_{132}	—	November 8, 2007	Kitt Peak	Spacewatch	NYS	1.1 km	MPC · JPL
411769	2012 BH_{133}	—	November 2, 2010	Mount Lemmon	Mount Lemmon Survey	·	2.7 km	MPC · JPL
411770	2012 BE_{134}	—	December 5, 1997	Caussols	ODAS	·	850 m	MPC · JPL
411771	2012 BY_{137}	—	October 29, 2010	Mount Lemmon	Mount Lemmon Survey	·	1.7 km	MPC · JPL
411772	2012 BY_{141}	—	February 22, 2004	Kitt Peak	Spacewatch	·	990 m	MPC · JPL
411773	2012 BZ_{143}	—	February 26, 2009	Kitt Peak	Spacewatch	·	680 m	MPC · JPL
411774	2012 BX_{146}	—	September 23, 2005	Kitt Peak	Spacewatch	·	2.0 km	MPC · JPL
411775	2012 BJ_{148}	—	March 28, 2008	Mount Lemmon	Mount Lemmon Survey	·	1.5 km	MPC · JPL
411776	2012 BW_{148}	—	January 29, 2012	Mount Lemmon	Mount Lemmon Survey	·	1.5 km	MPC · JPL
411777	2012 BM_{149}	—	September 30, 2003	Kitt Peak	Spacewatch	MAS	700 m	MPC · JPL
411778	2012 CZ_{6}	—	January 14, 2012	Kitt Peak	Spacewatch	·	2.8 km	MPC · JPL
411779	2012 CO_{7}	—	March 5, 2008	Kitt Peak	Spacewatch	·	1.6 km	MPC · JPL
411780	2012 CW_{7}	—	January 4, 2012	Mount Lemmon	Mount Lemmon Survey	·	2.9 km	MPC · JPL
411781	2012 CM_{9}	—	October 29, 2010	Mount Lemmon	Mount Lemmon Survey	·	1.4 km	MPC · JPL
411782	2012 CA_{10}	—	October 11, 2010	Mount Lemmon	Mount Lemmon Survey	·	1.3 km	MPC · JPL
411783	2012 CW_{10}	—	September 28, 2003	Kitt Peak	Spacewatch	MAS	680 m	MPC · JPL
411784	2012 CZ_{11}	—	January 30, 2012	Kitt Peak	Spacewatch	·	2.7 km	MPC · JPL
411785	2012 CJ_{13}	—	April 19, 2007	Mount Lemmon	Mount Lemmon Survey	·	2.4 km	MPC · JPL
411786	2012 CD_{16}	—	February 27, 2008	Mount Lemmon	Mount Lemmon Survey	·	1.2 km	MPC · JPL
411787	2012 CO_{16}	—	June 19, 2010	Mount Lemmon	Mount Lemmon Survey	·	1.2 km	MPC · JPL
411788	2012 CU_{17}	—	November 14, 2007	Kitt Peak	Spacewatch	MAS	560 m	MPC · JPL
411789	2012 CX_{20}	—	November 19, 2006	Kitt Peak	Spacewatch	·	2.2 km	MPC · JPL
411790	2012 CB_{23}	—	October 11, 2010	Mount Lemmon	Mount Lemmon Survey	·	1.6 km	MPC · JPL
411791	2012 CZ_{25}	—	September 30, 2003	Kitt Peak	Spacewatch	·	1.2 km	MPC · JPL
411792	2012 CQ_{33}	—	December 31, 1994	Kitt Peak	Spacewatch	(5)	1.4 km	MPC · JPL
411793	2012 CB_{34}	—	November 30, 2003	Kitt Peak	Spacewatch	·	1.2 km	MPC · JPL
411794	2012 CB_{40}	—	February 17, 2007	Mount Lemmon	Mount Lemmon Survey	·	1.7 km	MPC · JPL
411795	2012 CJ_{44}	—	March 10, 2007	Mount Lemmon	Mount Lemmon Survey	·	3.8 km	MPC · JPL
411796	2012 CO_{44}	—	October 27, 2003	Kitt Peak	Spacewatch	·	1.4 km	MPC · JPL
411797	2012 CY_{50}	—	January 15, 2008	Mount Lemmon	Mount Lemmon Survey	·	1.1 km	MPC · JPL
411798	2012 CO_{51}	—	October 13, 2006	Kitt Peak	Spacewatch	·	1.3 km	MPC · JPL
411799	2012 CD_{57}	—	October 9, 2007	Kitt Peak	Spacewatch	·	780 m	MPC · JPL
411800	2012 CF_{57}	—	November 19, 2003	Socorro	LINEAR	·	1.5 km	MPC · JPL

== 411801–411900 ==
back to top

Designation			Discovery			Properties		Ref
Permanent	Provisional	Named after	Date	Site	Discoverer(s)	Category	Diam.	Ref
411801	2012 CM_{57}	—	February 14, 2008	Catalina	CSS	·	1.7 km	MPC · JPL
411802	2012 DW_{2}	—	January 10, 2007	Kitt Peak	Spacewatch	·	2.3 km	MPC · JPL
411803	2012 DQ_{3}	—	December 27, 2006	Mount Lemmon	Mount Lemmon Survey	·	2.5 km	MPC · JPL
411804	2012 DF_{6}	—	February 13, 2008	Mount Lemmon	Mount Lemmon Survey	EUN	1.1 km	MPC · JPL
411805	2012 DY_{9}	—	September 15, 2007	Mount Lemmon	Mount Lemmon Survey	·	940 m	MPC · JPL
411806	2012 DD_{12}	—	May 23, 2003	Kitt Peak	Spacewatch	·	2.4 km	MPC · JPL
411807	2012 DA_{18}	—	August 19, 2006	Kitt Peak	Spacewatch	NYS	1.4 km	MPC · JPL
411808	2012 DN_{22}	—	January 2, 2011	Mount Lemmon	Mount Lemmon Survey	EOS	2.3 km	MPC · JPL
411809	2012 DX_{24}	—	November 1, 2005	Mount Lemmon	Mount Lemmon Survey	·	2.4 km	MPC · JPL
411810	2012 DA_{25}	—	January 25, 2007	Catalina	CSS	·	2.6 km	MPC · JPL
411811	2012 DU_{25}	—	February 4, 2006	Catalina	CSS	·	4.4 km	MPC · JPL
411812	2012 DT_{27}	—	March 2, 2001	Anderson Mesa	LONEOS	·	1.5 km	MPC · JPL
411813	2012 DX_{27}	—	February 24, 2003	Campo Imperatore	CINEOS	·	2.3 km	MPC · JPL
411814	2012 DK_{28}	—	October 5, 2005	Mount Lemmon	Mount Lemmon Survey	·	1.8 km	MPC · JPL
411815	2012 DG_{30}	—	March 14, 2007	Mount Lemmon	Mount Lemmon Survey	·	2.1 km	MPC · JPL
411816	2012 DP_{31}	—	November 3, 2011	Mount Lemmon	Mount Lemmon Survey	·	3.4 km	MPC · JPL
411817	2012 DF_{33}	—	November 20, 2007	Mount Lemmon	Mount Lemmon Survey	·	1.7 km	MPC · JPL
411818	2012 DR_{33}	—	March 9, 2005	Mount Lemmon	Mount Lemmon Survey	·	1.3 km	MPC · JPL
411819	2012 DO_{34}	—	February 23, 2012	Kitt Peak	Spacewatch	·	2.9 km	MPC · JPL
411820	2012 DZ_{36}	—	September 28, 2003	Anderson Mesa	LONEOS	·	3.8 km	MPC · JPL
411821	2012 DB_{37}	—	July 27, 2009	Kitt Peak	Spacewatch	·	1.8 km	MPC · JPL
411822	2012 DO_{40}	—	March 18, 2007	Kitt Peak	Spacewatch	·	1.6 km	MPC · JPL
411823	2012 DT_{41}	—	November 6, 2010	Mount Lemmon	Mount Lemmon Survey	·	2.5 km	MPC · JPL
411824	2012 DP_{43}	—	December 13, 2006	Mount Lemmon	Mount Lemmon Survey	·	1.9 km	MPC · JPL
411825	2012 DC_{44}	—	February 22, 2012	Kitt Peak	Spacewatch	·	3.0 km	MPC · JPL
411826	2012 DH_{44}	—	October 9, 2010	Kitt Peak	Spacewatch	·	1.7 km	MPC · JPL
411827	2012 DW_{45}	—	January 22, 2006	Mount Lemmon	Mount Lemmon Survey	·	2.4 km	MPC · JPL
411828	2012 DA_{47}	—	March 27, 2004	Kitt Peak	Spacewatch	·	1.5 km	MPC · JPL
411829	2012 DD_{47}	—	March 4, 2008	Mount Lemmon	Mount Lemmon Survey	·	1.8 km	MPC · JPL
411830	2012 DL_{47}	—	December 27, 2011	Mount Lemmon	Mount Lemmon Survey	·	4.2 km	MPC · JPL
411831	2012 DX_{47}	—	February 25, 2012	Kitt Peak	Spacewatch	·	3.4 km	MPC · JPL
411832	2012 DS_{48}	—	January 19, 2012	Kitt Peak	Spacewatch	·	3.0 km	MPC · JPL
411833	2012 DA_{50}	—	February 21, 2007	Kitt Peak	Spacewatch	·	1.9 km	MPC · JPL
411834	2012 DT_{50}	—	September 11, 2004	Kitt Peak	Spacewatch	KOR	1.5 km	MPC · JPL
411835	2012 DZ_{50}	—	November 11, 2010	Kitt Peak	Spacewatch	·	1.6 km	MPC · JPL
411836	2012 DO_{51}	—	September 18, 2003	Kitt Peak	Spacewatch	·	4.2 km	MPC · JPL
411837	2012 DY_{52}	—	November 17, 1999	Kitt Peak	Spacewatch	·	2.0 km	MPC · JPL
411838	2012 DY_{54}	—	March 27, 2003	Kitt Peak	Spacewatch	·	1.9 km	MPC · JPL
411839	2012 DU_{55}	—	January 28, 2007	Kitt Peak	Spacewatch	·	2.8 km	MPC · JPL
411840	2012 DW_{55}	—	November 2, 2006	Mount Lemmon	Mount Lemmon Survey	·	1.7 km	MPC · JPL
411841	2012 DU_{56}	—	November 27, 2010	Mount Lemmon	Mount Lemmon Survey	·	1.8 km	MPC · JPL
411842	2012 DP_{57}	—	October 2, 1999	Kitt Peak	Spacewatch	·	1.2 km	MPC · JPL
411843	2012 DU_{58}	—	October 17, 2010	Mount Lemmon	Mount Lemmon Survey	·	1.6 km	MPC · JPL
411844	2012 DF_{59}	—	November 5, 2010	Kitt Peak	Spacewatch	·	2.0 km	MPC · JPL
411845	2012 DU_{61}	—	November 26, 2005	Kitt Peak	Spacewatch	EOS	2.6 km	MPC · JPL
411846	2012 DD_{63}	—	October 6, 2000	Kitt Peak	Spacewatch	·	610 m	MPC · JPL
411847	2012 DP_{65}	—	March 16, 2004	Campo Imperatore	CINEOS	·	1.2 km	MPC · JPL
411848	2012 DW_{72}	—	April 6, 2008	Kitt Peak	Spacewatch	·	1.1 km	MPC · JPL
411849	2012 DZ_{72}	—	September 17, 2009	Kitt Peak	Spacewatch	·	2.7 km	MPC · JPL
411850	2012 DP_{74}	—	December 19, 2007	Mount Lemmon	Mount Lemmon Survey	·	1.5 km	MPC · JPL
411851	2012 DV_{74}	—	December 5, 2007	Catalina	CSS	·	1.1 km	MPC · JPL
411852	2012 DC_{75}	—	October 14, 2010	Mount Lemmon	Mount Lemmon Survey	KOR	1.2 km	MPC · JPL
411853	2012 DU_{75}	—	September 3, 2008	Kitt Peak	Spacewatch	·	3.9 km	MPC · JPL
411854	2012 DU_{76}	—	March 31, 2003	Kitt Peak	Spacewatch	·	2.4 km	MPC · JPL
411855	2012 DX_{76}	—	September 16, 2001	Socorro	LINEAR	·	2.1 km	MPC · JPL
411856	2012 DR_{82}	—	October 27, 2005	Kitt Peak	Spacewatch	·	2.0 km	MPC · JPL
411857	2012 DH_{83}	—	September 29, 2005	Kitt Peak	Spacewatch	·	1.5 km	MPC · JPL
411858	2012 DL_{83}	—	February 8, 2008	Mount Lemmon	Mount Lemmon Survey	·	1.2 km	MPC · JPL
411859	2012 DF_{84}	—	February 21, 2007	Mount Lemmon	Mount Lemmon Survey	KOR	1.4 km	MPC · JPL
411860	2012 DP_{86}	—	April 16, 2001	Anderson Mesa	LONEOS	·	1.7 km	MPC · JPL
411861	2012 DY_{86}	—	August 28, 2009	Kitt Peak	Spacewatch	·	2.0 km	MPC · JPL
411862	2012 DY_{90}	—	January 24, 2001	Kitt Peak	Spacewatch	MAS	670 m	MPC · JPL
411863	2012 DK_{92}	—	April 6, 1999	Kitt Peak	Spacewatch	·	1.6 km	MPC · JPL
411864	2012 DT_{92}	—	January 24, 2007	Mount Lemmon	Mount Lemmon Survey	·	1.5 km	MPC · JPL
411865	2012 DL_{95}	—	November 12, 2007	Mount Lemmon	Mount Lemmon Survey	·	970 m	MPC · JPL
411866	2012 DQ_{95}	—	March 20, 2007	Mount Lemmon	Mount Lemmon Survey	·	1.5 km	MPC · JPL
411867	2012 DX_{96}	—	February 23, 2007	Kitt Peak	Spacewatch	·	2.4 km	MPC · JPL
411868	2012 EE	—	July 25, 2010	WISE	WISE	KON	2.6 km	MPC · JPL
411869	2012 EO	—	February 24, 2008	Mount Lemmon	Mount Lemmon Survey	·	1.2 km	MPC · JPL
411870	2012 ES	—	October 17, 2009	Mount Lemmon	Mount Lemmon Survey	·	1.8 km	MPC · JPL
411871	2012 EV	—	November 2, 2010	Mount Lemmon	Mount Lemmon Survey	·	1.4 km	MPC · JPL
411872	2012 EG_{1}	—	March 27, 2003	Kitt Peak	Spacewatch	AGN	1.3 km	MPC · JPL
411873	2012 EN_{2}	—	August 16, 2009	Kitt Peak	Spacewatch	·	3.3 km	MPC · JPL
411874	2012 EW_{2}	—	April 19, 2004	Kitt Peak	Spacewatch	·	1.6 km	MPC · JPL
411875	2012 EW_{4}	—	January 25, 2010	WISE	WISE	·	4.0 km	MPC · JPL
411876	2012 EE_{7}	—	November 18, 2006	Mount Lemmon	Mount Lemmon Survey	MAR	1.2 km	MPC · JPL
411877	2012 FQ	—	March 26, 2008	Kitt Peak	Spacewatch	·	1.3 km	MPC · JPL
411878	2012 FN_{5}	—	November 14, 2010	Mount Lemmon	Mount Lemmon Survey	·	1.9 km	MPC · JPL
411879	2012 FP_{8}	—	March 4, 2012	Mount Lemmon	Mount Lemmon Survey	·	2.9 km	MPC · JPL
411880	2012 FS_{10}	—	March 9, 2008	Kitt Peak	Spacewatch	·	950 m	MPC · JPL
411881	2012 FO_{11}	—	October 17, 2010	Catalina	CSS	·	1.6 km	MPC · JPL
411882	2012 FQ_{15}	—	October 10, 2010	Mount Lemmon	Mount Lemmon Survey	·	1.7 km	MPC · JPL
411883	2012 FT_{25}	—	December 29, 2005	Kitt Peak	Spacewatch	·	1.8 km	MPC · JPL
411884	2012 FX_{25}	—	March 14, 2007	Kitt Peak	Spacewatch	·	1.9 km	MPC · JPL
411885	2012 FQ_{26}	—	October 28, 1995	Kitt Peak	Spacewatch	·	1.8 km	MPC · JPL
411886	2012 FF_{28}	—	October 30, 2005	Mount Lemmon	Mount Lemmon Survey	·	1.5 km	MPC · JPL
411887	2012 FA_{29}	—	September 30, 2005	Mount Lemmon	Mount Lemmon Survey	·	1.7 km	MPC · JPL
411888	2012 FK_{32}	—	February 7, 2006	Mount Lemmon	Mount Lemmon Survey	·	2.9 km	MPC · JPL
411889	2012 FE_{33}	—	September 19, 2003	Kitt Peak	Spacewatch	·	2.8 km	MPC · JPL
411890	2012 FJ_{35}	—	October 8, 2005	Kitt Peak	Spacewatch	·	1.7 km	MPC · JPL
411891	2012 FK_{36}	—	March 15, 2007	Mount Lemmon	Mount Lemmon Survey	·	2.6 km	MPC · JPL
411892	2012 FT_{36}	—	September 27, 2009	Kitt Peak	Spacewatch	·	2.5 km	MPC · JPL
411893	2012 FD_{39}	—	December 20, 2006	Mount Lemmon	Mount Lemmon Survey	·	1.9 km	MPC · JPL
411894	2012 FC_{40}	—	January 28, 2006	Mount Lemmon	Mount Lemmon Survey	EOS	2.3 km	MPC · JPL
411895	2012 FH_{40}	—	October 9, 2004	Kitt Peak	Spacewatch	·	3.4 km	MPC · JPL
411896	2012 FQ_{40}	—	May 2, 2008	Mount Lemmon	Mount Lemmon Survey	·	1.9 km	MPC · JPL
411897	2012 FV_{40}	—	April 22, 2007	Mount Lemmon	Mount Lemmon Survey	·	2.5 km	MPC · JPL
411898	2012 FN_{41}	—	September 30, 2005	Mount Lemmon	Mount Lemmon Survey	·	1.8 km	MPC · JPL
411899	2012 FF_{42}	—	October 10, 2004	Kitt Peak	Spacewatch	KOR	1.7 km	MPC · JPL
411900	2012 FK_{46}	—	April 14, 2008	Mount Lemmon	Mount Lemmon Survey	·	1.3 km	MPC · JPL

== 411901–412000 ==
back to top

Designation			Discovery			Properties		Ref
Permanent	Provisional	Named after	Date	Site	Discoverer(s)	Category	Diam.	Ref
411901	2012 FF_{47}	—	October 27, 2005	Mount Lemmon	Mount Lemmon Survey	·	2.2 km	MPC · JPL
411902	2012 FA_{54}	—	March 17, 1996	Kitt Peak	Spacewatch	·	2.6 km	MPC · JPL
411903	2012 FJ_{54}	—	September 1, 2005	Kitt Peak	Spacewatch	·	1.6 km	MPC · JPL
411904	2012 FU_{56}	—	October 12, 1993	Kitt Peak	Spacewatch	EOS	2.0 km	MPC · JPL
411905	2012 FQ_{59}	—	October 7, 2004	Kitt Peak	Spacewatch	·	3.1 km	MPC · JPL
411906	2012 FU_{59}	—	September 21, 2003	Kitt Peak	Spacewatch	AEG	3.6 km	MPC · JPL
411907	2012 FP_{61}	—	September 17, 2009	Mount Lemmon	Mount Lemmon Survey	VER	2.3 km	MPC · JPL
411908	2012 FY_{62}	—	February 26, 2007	Mount Lemmon	Mount Lemmon Survey	·	2.0 km	MPC · JPL
411909	2012 FK_{63}	—	May 13, 1997	Kitt Peak	Spacewatch	PHO	910 m	MPC · JPL
411910	2012 FN_{63}	—	March 15, 2007	Kitt Peak	Spacewatch	BRA	1.8 km	MPC · JPL
411911	2012 FO_{65}	—	April 12, 1999	Kitt Peak	Spacewatch	·	1.6 km	MPC · JPL
411912	2012 FS_{66}	—	November 13, 2010	Mount Lemmon	Mount Lemmon Survey	·	1.5 km	MPC · JPL
411913	2012 FZ_{66}	—	March 9, 2007	Kitt Peak	Spacewatch	·	1.9 km	MPC · JPL
411914	2012 FD_{67}	—	April 2, 1995	Kitt Peak	Spacewatch	·	1.3 km	MPC · JPL
411915	2012 FS_{68}	—	December 15, 2010	Mount Lemmon	Mount Lemmon Survey	·	1.7 km	MPC · JPL
411916	2012 FT_{68}	—	September 16, 2003	Kitt Peak	Spacewatch	EUP	4.0 km	MPC · JPL
411917	2012 FZ_{68}	—	December 1, 2005	Kitt Peak	Spacewatch	·	2.2 km	MPC · JPL
411918	2012 FK_{69}	—	November 11, 2001	Socorro	LINEAR	HNS	1.4 km	MPC · JPL
411919	2012 FF_{70}	—	January 16, 2011	Mount Lemmon	Mount Lemmon Survey	·	2.2 km	MPC · JPL
411920	2012 FG_{70}	—	August 23, 1998	Kitt Peak	Spacewatch	EOS	2.4 km	MPC · JPL
411921	2012 FR_{73}	—	September 20, 2009	Mount Lemmon	Mount Lemmon Survey	·	3.7 km	MPC · JPL
411922	2012 FR_{74}	—	August 23, 2001	Anderson Mesa	LONEOS	HNS	1.5 km	MPC · JPL
411923	2012 FZ_{75}	—	February 2, 2006	Kitt Peak	Spacewatch	·	3.2 km	MPC · JPL
411924	2012 FD_{82}	—	November 6, 2005	Mount Lemmon	Mount Lemmon Survey	·	2.8 km	MPC · JPL
411925	2012 FE_{82}	—	April 23, 2007	Kitt Peak	Spacewatch	·	5.7 km	MPC · JPL
411926	2012 FN_{83}	—	November 11, 2004	Kitt Peak	Spacewatch	LIX	4.4 km	MPC · JPL
411927	2012 GB_{1}	—	October 12, 1998	Kitt Peak	Spacewatch	·	3.0 km	MPC · JPL
411928	2012 GP_{2}	—	November 10, 2009	Mount Lemmon	Mount Lemmon Survey	VER	3.1 km	MPC · JPL
411929	2012 GX_{2}	—	November 9, 1993	Kitt Peak	Spacewatch	·	2.9 km	MPC · JPL
411930	2012 GX_{3}	—	March 16, 2012	Kitt Peak	Spacewatch	CYB	3.4 km	MPC · JPL
411931	2012 GS_{7}	—	January 23, 2006	Catalina	CSS	LIX	3.7 km	MPC · JPL
411932	2012 GQ_{8}	—	October 1, 2005	Mount Lemmon	Mount Lemmon Survey	·	1.9 km	MPC · JPL
411933	2012 GL_{9}	—	September 26, 2005	Kitt Peak	Spacewatch	·	2.0 km	MPC · JPL
411934	2012 GB_{10}	—	April 18, 2007	Kitt Peak	Spacewatch	EOS	1.6 km	MPC · JPL
411935	2012 GO_{10}	—	September 29, 2008	Kitt Peak	Spacewatch	·	3.2 km	MPC · JPL
411936	2012 GY_{12}	—	March 19, 2001	Anderson Mesa	LONEOS	TIR	3.5 km	MPC · JPL
411937	2012 GH_{19}	—	October 2, 2003	Kitt Peak	Spacewatch	VER	3.2 km	MPC · JPL
411938	2012 GY_{19}	—	April 25, 2007	Kitt Peak	Spacewatch	EOS	1.9 km	MPC · JPL
411939	2012 GV_{21}	—	November 22, 2006	Mount Lemmon	Mount Lemmon Survey	·	1.5 km	MPC · JPL
411940	2012 GA_{22}	—	October 23, 2009	Mount Lemmon	Mount Lemmon Survey	·	2.1 km	MPC · JPL
411941	2012 GY_{23}	—	February 22, 2006	Anderson Mesa	LONEOS	·	3.2 km	MPC · JPL
411942	2012 GD_{24}	—	December 8, 2010	Kitt Peak	Spacewatch	HYG	2.7 km	MPC · JPL
411943	2012 GZ_{25}	—	February 26, 2012	Kitt Peak	Spacewatch	·	3.0 km	MPC · JPL
411944	2012 GY_{29}	—	October 24, 2003	Kitt Peak	Spacewatch	VER	2.7 km	MPC · JPL
411945	2012 GS_{30}	—	February 10, 2007	Catalina	CSS	·	2.5 km	MPC · JPL
411946	2012 GB_{36}	—	October 22, 2003	Kitt Peak	Spacewatch	EOS	3.2 km	MPC · JPL
411947	2012 GE_{37}	—	November 17, 2004	Campo Imperatore	CINEOS	·	2.5 km	MPC · JPL
411948	2012 GR_{37}	—	November 20, 2009	Kitt Peak	Spacewatch	CYB	5.1 km	MPC · JPL
411949	2012 HB_{6}	—	February 24, 2006	Catalina	CSS	·	4.3 km	MPC · JPL
411950	2012 HY_{14}	—	February 1, 2006	Kitt Peak	Spacewatch	EOS	2.8 km	MPC · JPL
411951	2012 HE_{15}	—	April 25, 2007	Kitt Peak	Spacewatch	EOS	1.9 km	MPC · JPL
411952	2012 HX_{16}	—	September 6, 2008	Catalina	CSS	EOS	2.1 km	MPC · JPL
411953	2012 HJ_{18}	—	January 16, 2007	Catalina	CSS	EUN	1.6 km	MPC · JPL
411954	2012 HS_{19}	—	March 31, 2003	Anderson Mesa	LONEOS	·	2.0 km	MPC · JPL
411955	2012 HS_{21}	—	May 25, 2006	Mount Lemmon	Mount Lemmon Survey	TIR	2.6 km	MPC · JPL
411956	2012 HG_{28}	—	January 8, 2010	Mount Lemmon	Mount Lemmon Survey	·	3.5 km	MPC · JPL
411957	2012 HS_{30}	—	December 10, 2004	Kitt Peak	Spacewatch	EOS	1.8 km	MPC · JPL
411958	2012 HH_{34}	—	November 22, 2009	Catalina	CSS	·	2.5 km	MPC · JPL
411959	2012 HS_{36}	—	November 27, 2009	Mount Lemmon	Mount Lemmon Survey	·	3.4 km	MPC · JPL
411960	2012 HZ_{37}	—	December 11, 2004	Kitt Peak	Spacewatch	·	2.8 km	MPC · JPL
411961	2012 HM_{38}	—	September 16, 2009	Kitt Peak	Spacewatch	·	2.5 km	MPC · JPL
411962	2012 HD_{42}	—	September 17, 2009	Mount Lemmon	Mount Lemmon Survey	·	2.3 km	MPC · JPL
411963	2012 HC_{44}	—	September 21, 2008	Mount Lemmon	Mount Lemmon Survey	·	4.2 km	MPC · JPL
411964	2012 HB_{45}	—	September 5, 2008	Kitt Peak	Spacewatch	·	3.3 km	MPC · JPL
411965	2012 HJ_{46}	—	November 9, 2004	Catalina	CSS	·	2.1 km	MPC · JPL
411966	2012 HO_{46}	—	November 25, 2009	Mount Lemmon	Mount Lemmon Survey	·	4.2 km	MPC · JPL
411967	2012 HW_{47}	—	September 28, 2008	Catalina	CSS	(7605)	3.5 km	MPC · JPL
411968	2012 HH_{49}	—	April 22, 2012	Kitt Peak	Spacewatch	EOS	2.1 km	MPC · JPL
411969	2012 HV_{50}	—	November 17, 2009	Catalina	CSS	·	4.7 km	MPC · JPL
411970	2012 HE_{52}	—	March 18, 2007	Kitt Peak	Spacewatch	·	2.6 km	MPC · JPL
411971	2012 HZ_{53}	—	September 10, 2004	Kitt Peak	Spacewatch	·	2.0 km	MPC · JPL
411972	2012 HU_{56}	—	February 25, 2006	Kitt Peak	Spacewatch	·	2.4 km	MPC · JPL
411973	2012 HU_{58}	—	May 10, 2007	Mount Lemmon	Mount Lemmon Survey	·	2.6 km	MPC · JPL
411974	2012 HY_{58}	—	January 13, 2010	Mount Lemmon	Mount Lemmon Survey	·	4.5 km	MPC · JPL
411975	2012 HV_{59}	—	October 23, 2009	Mount Lemmon	Mount Lemmon Survey	·	2.2 km	MPC · JPL
411976	2012 HF_{64}	—	October 27, 2003	Kitt Peak	Spacewatch	EOS	2.2 km	MPC · JPL
411977	2012 HT_{65}	—	October 13, 2010	Kitt Peak	Spacewatch	·	2.9 km	MPC · JPL
411978	2012 HN_{66}	—	February 1, 2010	WISE	WISE	·	3.9 km	MPC · JPL
411979	2012 HV_{69}	—	March 8, 2003	Anderson Mesa	LONEOS	·	2.6 km	MPC · JPL
411980	2012 HK_{74}	—	May 17, 2002	Kitt Peak	Spacewatch	·	2.4 km	MPC · JPL
411981	2012 HJ_{78}	—	April 9, 2006	Mount Lemmon	Mount Lemmon Survey	·	3.4 km	MPC · JPL
411982	2012 JN_{2}	—	November 6, 2005	Mount Lemmon	Mount Lemmon Survey	·	2.7 km	MPC · JPL
411983	2012 JD_{3}	—	November 5, 2003	Anderson Mesa	LONEOS	·	3.9 km	MPC · JPL
411984	2012 JN_{8}	—	October 29, 2008	Mount Lemmon	Mount Lemmon Survey	·	3.2 km	MPC · JPL
411985	2012 JF_{16}	—	March 11, 2010	WISE	WISE	·	4.5 km	MPC · JPL
411986	2012 JY_{16}	—	December 12, 2004	Kitt Peak	Spacewatch	·	3.3 km	MPC · JPL
411987	2012 JG_{18}	—	January 31, 2006	Kitt Peak	Spacewatch	·	2.4 km	MPC · JPL
411988	2012 JJ_{23}	—	April 19, 2006	Kitt Peak	Spacewatch	·	3.8 km	MPC · JPL
411989	2012 JY_{23}	—	December 11, 2004	Kitt Peak	Spacewatch	·	3.5 km	MPC · JPL
411990	2012 JB_{27}	—	December 24, 2006	Mount Lemmon	Mount Lemmon Survey	HNS	1.5 km	MPC · JPL
411991	2012 JY_{38}	—	June 8, 2007	Kitt Peak	Spacewatch	EOS	1.8 km	MPC · JPL
411992	2012 JG_{40}	—	February 21, 2007	Catalina	CSS	·	2.0 km	MPC · JPL
411993	2012 JQ_{40}	—	October 1, 2003	Kitt Peak	Spacewatch	TIR	2.9 km	MPC · JPL
411994	2012 JX_{45}	—	December 16, 2004	Kitt Peak	Spacewatch	·	3.6 km	MPC · JPL
411995	2012 JF_{52}	—	January 31, 2006	Kitt Peak	Spacewatch	KOR ·	4.8 km	MPC · JPL
411996	2012 JW_{52}	—	September 22, 2009	Mount Lemmon	Mount Lemmon Survey	·	4.7 km	MPC · JPL
411997	2012 JH_{61}	—	November 19, 2003	Kitt Peak	Spacewatch	·	4.3 km	MPC · JPL
411998	2012 KA_{9}	—	January 8, 2003	Socorro	LINEAR	·	1.4 km	MPC · JPL
411999	2012 KE_{12}	—	August 26, 2008	Siding Spring	SSS	·	4.9 km	MPC · JPL
412000	2012 KG_{16}	—	October 1, 2008	Mount Lemmon	Mount Lemmon Survey	·	3.3 km	MPC · JPL

back to top

== Meaning of names ==
As minor planet discoveries are confirmed, they are given a permanent number by the IAU's Minor Planet Center (MPC), and the discoverers can then submit names for them, following the IAU's naming conventions. The list below concerns those minor planets in the specified number-range that have received names, and explains the meanings of those names.

Official naming citations of newly named small Solar System bodies are approved and published in a bulletin by IAU's Working Group for Small Bodies Nomenclature (WGSBN). Before May 2021, citations were published in MPC's Minor Planet Circulars for many decades. Recent citations can also be found on the JPL Small-Body Database (SBDB). Until his death in 2016, German astronomer Lutz D. Schmadel compiled these citations into the Dictionary of Minor Planet Names (DMP) and regularly updated the collection.

Based on Paul Herget's The Names of the Minor Planets, Schmadel also researched the unclear origin of numerous asteroids, most of which had been named prior to World War II. This article incorporates text from this source, which is in the public domain: SBDB New namings may only be added to this list below after official publication as the preannouncement of names is condemned. The WGSBN publishes a comprehensive guideline for the naming rules of non-cometary small Solar System bodies.

Named minor planet	Provisional	This minor planet was named for...	Ref · Catalog
411717 Cherylreed	2012 BL_{8}	Cheryl Reed (b. 1960) is a Program Director at Northrop Grumman, after a long career spent at the Johns Hopkins University Applied Physics Laboratory. She has been involved in the program management of numerous space missions, and led the Double Asteroid Redirection Test from its conception to its confirmation as NASA's first planetary defense test mission.	IAU · 411717
