= List of minor planets: 446001–447000 =

The following is a partial list of minor planets, running from minor-planet number 446001 through 447000, inclusive. The primary data for this and other partial lists is based on JPL's "Small-Body Orbital Elements" and data available from the Minor Planet Center. Critical list information is also provided by the MPC, unless otherwise specified from Lowell Observatory. A detailed description of the table's columns and additional sources are given on the main page including a complete list of every page in this series, and a statistical break-up on the dynamical classification of minor planets.

Also see the summary list of all named bodies in numerical and alphabetical order, and the corresponding naming citations for the number range of this particular list. New namings may only be added to this list after official publication, as the preannouncement of names is condemned by the Working Group for Small Bodies Nomenclature of the International Astronomical Union.

Near-Earth obj.	MBA (inner)	MBA (outer)	Centaur
Mars-crosser	MBA (middle)	Jupiter trojan	Trans-Neptunian obj.
Unclassified

== 446001–446100 ==
Designation			Discovery			Properties		Ref
Permanent	Provisional	Named after	Date	Site	Discoverer(s)	Category	Diam.	Ref
446001	2013 CD_{23}	—	August 29, 2006	Catalina	CSS	·	4.4 km	MPC · JPL
446002	2013 CE_{26}	—	January 7, 2013	Kitt Peak	Spacewatch	·	1.6 km	MPC · JPL
446003	2013 CZ_{26}	—	September 28, 2003	Kitt Peak	Spacewatch	(5)	960 m	MPC · JPL
446004	2013 CO_{29}	—	January 18, 2013	Mount Lemmon	Mount Lemmon Survey	·	2.5 km	MPC · JPL
446005	2013 CO_{34}	—	March 3, 2009	Mount Lemmon	Mount Lemmon Survey	·	1.1 km	MPC · JPL
446006	2013 CR_{34}	—	February 6, 2000	Catalina	CSS	·	1.6 km	MPC · JPL
446007	2013 CC_{35}	—	April 22, 2009	Mount Lemmon	Mount Lemmon Survey	·	1.8 km	MPC · JPL
446008	2013 CP_{37}	—	December 6, 2008	Kitt Peak	Spacewatch	·	1.9 km	MPC · JPL
446009	2013 CB_{39}	—	November 20, 2007	Mount Lemmon	Mount Lemmon Survey	·	1.6 km	MPC · JPL
446010	2013 CB_{40}	—	March 3, 2006	Kitt Peak	Spacewatch	·	1.8 km	MPC · JPL
446011	2013 CJ_{41}	—	October 10, 2007	Mount Lemmon	Mount Lemmon Survey	·	1.2 km	MPC · JPL
446012	2013 CY_{46}	—	October 31, 2011	Mount Lemmon	Mount Lemmon Survey	·	1.8 km	MPC · JPL
446013	2013 CW_{47}	—	April 4, 2005	Catalina	CSS	·	1.9 km	MPC · JPL
446014	2013 CN_{51}	—	February 17, 2004	Kitt Peak	Spacewatch	·	2.5 km	MPC · JPL
446015	2013 CS_{52}	—	October 3, 2003	Kitt Peak	Spacewatch	EUN	1.4 km	MPC · JPL
446016	2013 CK_{53}	—	October 29, 2008	Mount Lemmon	Mount Lemmon Survey	MAR	1.2 km	MPC · JPL
446017	2013 CP_{53}	—	November 3, 2007	Mount Lemmon	Mount Lemmon Survey	·	1.2 km	MPC · JPL
446018	2013 CS_{53}	—	February 7, 2013	Kitt Peak	Spacewatch	·	2.7 km	MPC · JPL
446019	2013 CX_{53}	—	April 17, 2005	Kitt Peak	Spacewatch	·	1.1 km	MPC · JPL
446020	2013 CH_{56}	—	December 1, 2008	Kitt Peak	Spacewatch	NYS	1.1 km	MPC · JPL
446021	2013 CC_{57}	—	January 17, 2013	Catalina	CSS	·	2.3 km	MPC · JPL
446022	2013 CV_{57}	—	September 30, 2003	Kitt Peak	Spacewatch	·	1.2 km	MPC · JPL
446023	2013 CL_{60}	—	December 30, 2008	Mount Lemmon	Mount Lemmon Survey	·	1.3 km	MPC · JPL
446024	2013 CV_{64}	—	October 10, 2007	Mount Lemmon	Mount Lemmon Survey	·	1.3 km	MPC · JPL
446025	2013 CQ_{65}	—	December 2, 2008	Kitt Peak	Spacewatch	·	1.2 km	MPC · JPL
446026	2013 CY_{68}	—	November 5, 2007	Kitt Peak	Spacewatch	·	1.2 km	MPC · JPL
446027	2013 CD_{73}	—	October 5, 2004	Kitt Peak	Spacewatch	MAS	570 m	MPC · JPL
446028	2013 CH_{74}	—	November 9, 2007	Kitt Peak	Spacewatch	MRX	1.1 km	MPC · JPL
446029	2013 CQ_{78}	—	October 14, 2004	Kitt Peak	Spacewatch	V	800 m	MPC · JPL
446030	2013 CR_{78}	—	October 10, 2007	Kitt Peak	Spacewatch	·	1.6 km	MPC · JPL
446031	2013 CC_{81}	—	April 12, 2004	Kitt Peak	Spacewatch	DOR	2.1 km	MPC · JPL
446032	2013 CY_{83}	—	January 10, 2008	Mount Lemmon	Mount Lemmon Survey	·	1.9 km	MPC · JPL
446033	2013 CU_{86}	—	February 27, 2009	Kitt Peak	Spacewatch	(5)	1.1 km	MPC · JPL
446034	2013 CA_{90}	—	February 22, 2009	Kitt Peak	Spacewatch	·	1.3 km	MPC · JPL
446035	2013 CV_{94}	—	September 17, 2006	Kitt Peak	Spacewatch	·	1.6 km	MPC · JPL
446036	2013 CK_{95}	—	March 19, 2009	Mount Lemmon	Mount Lemmon Survey	·	1.2 km	MPC · JPL
446037	2013 CN_{95}	—	March 18, 2004	Kitt Peak	Spacewatch	·	1.8 km	MPC · JPL
446038	2013 CZ_{100}	—	January 17, 2013	Mount Lemmon	Mount Lemmon Survey	·	2.5 km	MPC · JPL
446039	2013 CW_{102}	—	November 4, 2007	Mount Lemmon	Mount Lemmon Survey	NEM	2.6 km	MPC · JPL
446040	2013 CS_{103}	—	February 22, 2007	Mount Lemmon	Mount Lemmon Survey	·	2.7 km	MPC · JPL
446041	2013 CH_{105}	—	March 8, 2008	Mount Lemmon	Mount Lemmon Survey	·	3.6 km	MPC · JPL
446042	2013 CU_{105}	—	September 26, 2006	Mount Lemmon	Mount Lemmon Survey	·	1.3 km	MPC · JPL
446043	2013 CP_{106}	—	January 19, 2004	Kitt Peak	Spacewatch	·	1.4 km	MPC · JPL
446044	2013 CR_{106}	—	January 15, 2009	Kitt Peak	Spacewatch	MAS	720 m	MPC · JPL
446045	2013 CG_{107}	—	August 23, 2004	Kitt Peak	Spacewatch	·	3.3 km	MPC · JPL
446046	2013 CU_{108}	—	August 27, 2006	Kitt Peak	Spacewatch	·	1.7 km	MPC · JPL
446047	2013 CX_{111}	—	May 1, 2006	Kitt Peak	Spacewatch	·	1.3 km	MPC · JPL
446048	2013 CB_{114}	—	November 5, 2007	Kitt Peak	Spacewatch	·	1.4 km	MPC · JPL
446049	2013 CA_{115}	—	March 17, 2004	Kitt Peak	Spacewatch	AGN	1.1 km	MPC · JPL
446050	2013 CP_{118}	—	December 5, 2008	Kitt Peak	Spacewatch	NYS	1.3 km	MPC · JPL
446051	2013 CU_{118}	—	October 18, 2007	Kitt Peak	Spacewatch	(5)	1.3 km	MPC · JPL
446052	2013 CL_{120}	—	September 12, 2007	Catalina	CSS	·	1.1 km	MPC · JPL
446053	2013 CT_{120}	—	February 10, 2002	Socorro	LINEAR	MAS	850 m	MPC · JPL
446054	2013 CC_{121}	—	February 29, 2004	Kitt Peak	Spacewatch	AEO	1.1 km	MPC · JPL
446055	2013 CL_{122}	—	December 15, 2007	Kitt Peak	Spacewatch	·	1.7 km	MPC · JPL
446056	2013 CD_{124}	—	September 27, 2011	Mount Lemmon	Mount Lemmon Survey	·	1.7 km	MPC · JPL
446057	2013 CE_{124}	—	February 29, 2004	Kitt Peak	Spacewatch	·	1.9 km	MPC · JPL
446058	2013 CE_{126}	—	September 16, 2009	Kitt Peak	Spacewatch	·	3.4 km	MPC · JPL
446059	2013 CU_{132}	—	February 3, 2009	Kitt Peak	Spacewatch	·	1.3 km	MPC · JPL
446060	2013 CQ_{134}	—	March 14, 2004	Socorro	LINEAR	526	2.7 km	MPC · JPL
446061	2013 CP_{135}	—	April 24, 2000	Kitt Peak	Spacewatch	·	1.6 km	MPC · JPL
446062	2013 CU_{135}	—	February 24, 2006	Anderson Mesa	LONEOS	PHO	1.0 km	MPC · JPL
446063	2013 CX_{136}	—	April 15, 2001	Kitt Peak	Spacewatch	·	1.7 km	MPC · JPL
446064	2013 CC_{137}	—	November 19, 2007	Kitt Peak	Spacewatch	·	1.2 km	MPC · JPL
446065	2013 CS_{148}	—	November 20, 2004	Kitt Peak	Spacewatch	·	1.2 km	MPC · JPL
446066	2013 CR_{150}	—	October 7, 2005	Kitt Peak	Spacewatch	·	2.7 km	MPC · JPL
446067	2013 CP_{151}	—	October 19, 2006	Kitt Peak	Spacewatch	AGN	1.2 km	MPC · JPL
446068	2013 CQ_{151}	—	August 27, 2006	Kitt Peak	Spacewatch	·	1.6 km	MPC · JPL
446069	2013 CO_{155}	—	December 31, 2007	Kitt Peak	Spacewatch	·	1.6 km	MPC · JPL
446070	2013 CV_{156}	—	September 19, 2006	Catalina	CSS	·	2.6 km	MPC · JPL
446071	2013 CC_{159}	—	February 14, 2013	Kitt Peak	Spacewatch	·	1.8 km	MPC · JPL
446072	2013 CE_{159}	—	October 16, 2006	Catalina	CSS	·	2.1 km	MPC · JPL
446073	2013 CC_{162}	—	November 15, 1998	Kitt Peak	Spacewatch	·	1.4 km	MPC · JPL
446074	2013 CV_{162}	—	April 9, 2008	Kitt Peak	Spacewatch	·	2.2 km	MPC · JPL
446075	2013 CR_{166}	—	April 24, 2009	Mount Lemmon	Mount Lemmon Survey	·	1.6 km	MPC · JPL
446076	2013 CD_{168}	—	November 2, 2011	Mount Lemmon	Mount Lemmon Survey	·	1.5 km	MPC · JPL
446077	2013 CE_{169}	—	November 17, 2004	Campo Imperatore	CINEOS	NYS	1.2 km	MPC · JPL
446078	2013 CA_{170}	—	February 19, 2009	Kitt Peak	Spacewatch	·	1.1 km	MPC · JPL
446079	2013 CV_{170}	—	April 8, 2008	Mount Lemmon	Mount Lemmon Survey	·	2.5 km	MPC · JPL
446080	2013 CV_{171}	—	October 2, 2006	Mount Lemmon	Mount Lemmon Survey	·	1.9 km	MPC · JPL
446081	2013 CW_{172}	—	February 8, 2013	XuYi	PMO NEO Survey Program	·	2.8 km	MPC · JPL
446082	2013 CQ_{174}	—	September 14, 2006	Kitt Peak	Spacewatch	MRX	1.1 km	MPC · JPL
446083	2013 CT_{177}	—	December 29, 2003	Kitt Peak	Spacewatch	·	1.6 km	MPC · JPL
446084	2013 CX_{178}	—	October 20, 2007	Mount Lemmon	Mount Lemmon Survey	·	1.3 km	MPC · JPL
446085	2013 CW_{179}	—	December 1, 2008	Mount Lemmon	Mount Lemmon Survey	·	1.6 km	MPC · JPL
446086	2013 CZ_{179}	—	December 14, 2004	Kitt Peak	Spacewatch	·	1.0 km	MPC · JPL
446087	2013 CN_{183}	—	November 3, 2005	Mount Lemmon	Mount Lemmon Survey	·	2.1 km	MPC · JPL
446088	2013 CK_{185}	—	September 15, 2007	Mount Lemmon	Mount Lemmon Survey	·	1.4 km	MPC · JPL
446089	2013 CD_{186}	—	September 10, 2007	Kitt Peak	Spacewatch	·	1 km	MPC · JPL
446090	2013 CF_{186}	—	October 2, 2003	Kitt Peak	Spacewatch	·	1.1 km	MPC · JPL
446091	2013 CV_{186}	—	September 23, 2006	Kitt Peak	Spacewatch	·	2.4 km	MPC · JPL
446092	2013 CE_{187}	—	April 16, 2005	Kitt Peak	Spacewatch	·	1.1 km	MPC · JPL
446093	2013 CX_{188}	—	October 10, 2007	Mount Lemmon	Mount Lemmon Survey	(5)	1.4 km	MPC · JPL
446094	2013 CN_{190}	—	May 25, 2006	Mount Lemmon	Mount Lemmon Survey	V	770 m	MPC · JPL
446095	2013 CR_{190}	—	December 16, 2007	Mount Lemmon	Mount Lemmon Survey	·	2.0 km	MPC · JPL
446096	2013 CC_{191}	—	November 16, 2000	Kitt Peak	Spacewatch	PHO	1.3 km	MPC · JPL
446097	2013 CW_{197}	—	March 10, 2002	Kitt Peak	Spacewatch	·	2.2 km	MPC · JPL
446098	2013 CO_{206}	—	May 7, 2005	Kitt Peak	Spacewatch	·	1.5 km	MPC · JPL
446099	2013 CP_{208}	—	September 28, 2006	Mount Lemmon	Mount Lemmon Survey	·	1.7 km	MPC · JPL
446100	2013 CN_{215}	—	September 12, 2010	Mount Lemmon	Mount Lemmon Survey	·	2.6 km	MPC · JPL

== 446101–446200 ==
back to top

Designation			Discovery			Properties		Ref
Permanent	Provisional	Named after	Date	Site	Discoverer(s)	Category	Diam.	Ref
446101	2013 CC_{216}	—	October 21, 2011	Kitt Peak	Spacewatch	WIT	920 m	MPC · JPL
446102	2013 DN_{2}	—	December 4, 2007	Kitt Peak	Spacewatch	·	1.9 km	MPC · JPL
446103	2013 DC_{3}	—	July 27, 2009	Catalina	CSS	·	4.3 km	MPC · JPL
446104	2013 DF_{3}	—	March 18, 2009	Kitt Peak	Spacewatch	·	1.0 km	MPC · JPL
446105	2013 DN_{4}	—	August 29, 2011	Siding Spring	SSS	·	970 m	MPC · JPL
446106	2013 DQ_{4}	—	February 13, 2004	Kitt Peak	Spacewatch	·	2.0 km	MPC · JPL
446107	2013 DR_{4}	—	January 12, 2008	Kitt Peak	Spacewatch	·	2.2 km	MPC · JPL
446108	2013 DU_{4}	—	March 29, 2000	Kitt Peak	Spacewatch	·	1.5 km	MPC · JPL
446109	2013 DG_{5}	—	January 17, 2013	Mount Lemmon	Mount Lemmon Survey	·	1.1 km	MPC · JPL
446110	2013 DT_{6}	—	November 19, 2003	Kitt Peak	Spacewatch	·	1.6 km	MPC · JPL
446111	2013 DJ_{11}	—	February 28, 2009	Kitt Peak	Spacewatch	·	1.4 km	MPC · JPL
446112	2013 DM_{13}	—	January 31, 2009	Kitt Peak	Spacewatch	GEF	1.3 km	MPC · JPL
446113	2013 DT_{15}	—	June 15, 2009	Mount Lemmon	Mount Lemmon Survey	·	3.2 km	MPC · JPL
446114	2013 EK_{1}	—	March 8, 2000	Kitt Peak	Spacewatch	EUN	1.4 km	MPC · JPL
446115	2013 EZ_{1}	—	February 11, 2002	Socorro	LINEAR	MAS	780 m	MPC · JPL
446116	2013 EL_{6}	—	November 9, 2007	Kitt Peak	Spacewatch	·	1.3 km	MPC · JPL
446117	2013 ES_{6}	—	October 28, 2006	Mount Lemmon	Mount Lemmon Survey	KOR	1.1 km	MPC · JPL
446118	2013 ER_{7}	—	February 26, 2008	Mount Lemmon	Mount Lemmon Survey	·	1.6 km	MPC · JPL
446119	2013 EW_{8}	—	September 30, 2005	Mount Lemmon	Mount Lemmon Survey	·	1.7 km	MPC · JPL
446120	2013 EB_{9}	—	October 5, 2002	Kitt Peak	Spacewatch	·	1.5 km	MPC · JPL
446121	2013 EH_{9}	—	January 22, 2013	Mount Lemmon	Mount Lemmon Survey	EOS	1.8 km	MPC · JPL
446122	2013 EG_{12}	—	February 7, 2008	Kitt Peak	Spacewatch	·	1.8 km	MPC · JPL
446123	2013 EW_{19}	—	October 3, 2006	Mount Lemmon	Mount Lemmon Survey	HOF	2.6 km	MPC · JPL
446124	2013 EN_{21}	—	March 8, 2008	Kitt Peak	Spacewatch	·	2.5 km	MPC · JPL
446125	2013 EM_{22}	—	March 9, 2002	Kitt Peak	Spacewatch	·	2.8 km	MPC · JPL
446126	2013 EF_{30}	—	May 3, 2002	Kitt Peak	Spacewatch	·	3.6 km	MPC · JPL
446127	2013 EJ_{32}	—	November 9, 2007	Mount Lemmon	Mount Lemmon Survey	·	1.4 km	MPC · JPL
446128	2013 EW_{32}	—	January 21, 2002	Socorro	LINEAR	·	3.2 km	MPC · JPL
446129	2013 EC_{33}	—	December 16, 2007	Mount Lemmon	Mount Lemmon Survey	·	2.4 km	MPC · JPL
446130	2013 ES_{33}	—	September 21, 2001	Socorro	LINEAR	·	3.1 km	MPC · JPL
446131	2013 EB_{35}	—	March 11, 2008	Kitt Peak	Spacewatch	·	3.1 km	MPC · JPL
446132	2013 EL_{47}	—	March 10, 2000	Kitt Peak	Spacewatch	·	1.2 km	MPC · JPL
446133	2013 EV_{48}	—	December 27, 2006	Mount Lemmon	Mount Lemmon Survey	KOR	1.3 km	MPC · JPL
446134	2013 EF_{51}	—	December 1, 1994	Kitt Peak	Spacewatch	EOS	2.0 km	MPC · JPL
446135	2013 ET_{55}	—	February 14, 2013	Kitt Peak	Spacewatch	EOS	1.8 km	MPC · JPL
446136	2013 EV_{60}	—	October 17, 2006	Mount Lemmon	Mount Lemmon Survey	KOR	1.5 km	MPC · JPL
446137	2013 EB_{65}	—	April 6, 2008	Catalina	CSS	EOS	2.5 km	MPC · JPL
446138	2013 EW_{70}	—	February 1, 2008	Kitt Peak	Spacewatch	KOR	1.4 km	MPC · JPL
446139	2013 EA_{72}	—	January 10, 2008	Mount Lemmon	Mount Lemmon Survey	·	2.2 km	MPC · JPL
446140	2013 EG_{78}	—	September 28, 2006	Kitt Peak	Spacewatch	AGN	1.2 km	MPC · JPL
446141	2013 EZ_{79}	—	September 13, 2004	Kitt Peak	Spacewatch	·	1.0 km	MPC · JPL
446142	2013 EN_{80}	—	April 13, 2008	Mount Lemmon	Mount Lemmon Survey	·	3.0 km	MPC · JPL
446143	2013 EW_{83}	—	November 18, 2003	Kitt Peak	Spacewatch	·	1.2 km	MPC · JPL
446144	2013 EE_{86}	—	February 5, 2013	Kitt Peak	Spacewatch	·	2.4 km	MPC · JPL
446145	2013 EB_{93}	—	February 1, 2013	Kitt Peak	Spacewatch	·	4.1 km	MPC · JPL
446146	2013 EV_{94}	—	February 28, 2008	Mount Lemmon	Mount Lemmon Survey	·	1.7 km	MPC · JPL
446147	2013 EA_{95}	—	February 19, 2009	Kitt Peak	Spacewatch	·	1.4 km	MPC · JPL
446148	2013 ED_{97}	—	January 30, 2008	Mount Lemmon	Mount Lemmon Survey	·	1.9 km	MPC · JPL
446149	2013 ED_{99}	—	February 26, 2008	Mount Lemmon	Mount Lemmon Survey	·	1.7 km	MPC · JPL
446150	2013 EO_{102}	—	March 11, 2013	Kitt Peak	Spacewatch	VER	2.8 km	MPC · JPL
446151	2013 EW_{104}	—	March 10, 2008	Kitt Peak	Spacewatch	·	1.7 km	MPC · JPL
446152	2013 EZ_{104}	—	March 13, 2007	Mount Lemmon	Mount Lemmon Survey	HYG	3.0 km	MPC · JPL
446153	2013 EP_{106}	—	October 16, 2006	Catalina	CSS	NEM	2.3 km	MPC · JPL
446154	2013 EB_{109}	—	December 30, 2007	Catalina	CSS	MAR	1.4 km	MPC · JPL
446155	2013 ES_{110}	—	April 19, 2009	Mount Lemmon	Mount Lemmon Survey	·	1.8 km	MPC · JPL
446156	2013 EZ_{113}	—	November 1, 2005	Mount Lemmon	Mount Lemmon Survey	·	2.5 km	MPC · JPL
446157	2013 EJ_{114}	—	March 28, 2008	Kitt Peak	Spacewatch	·	3.5 km	MPC · JPL
446158	2013 EK_{115}	—	August 4, 2010	WISE	WISE	CYB	4.0 km	MPC · JPL
446159	2013 EA_{117}	—	March 29, 2008	Mount Lemmon	Mount Lemmon Survey	·	1.4 km	MPC · JPL
446160	2013 EP_{117}	—	October 12, 2007	Mount Lemmon	Mount Lemmon Survey	(5)	1.2 km	MPC · JPL
446161	2013 EH_{118}	—	March 19, 2004	Socorro	LINEAR	·	2.3 km	MPC · JPL
446162	2013 EC_{119}	—	September 30, 1997	Kitt Peak	Spacewatch	·	2.0 km	MPC · JPL
446163	2013 EE_{119}	—	February 6, 2002	Socorro	LINEAR	·	2.3 km	MPC · JPL
446164	2013 ED_{120}	—	October 20, 2006	Mount Lemmon	Mount Lemmon Survey	HOF	2.8 km	MPC · JPL
446165	2013 EF_{122}	—	September 11, 2004	Kitt Peak	Spacewatch	·	2.5 km	MPC · JPL
446166	2013 EX_{122}	—	April 5, 2003	Kitt Peak	Spacewatch	·	1.8 km	MPC · JPL
446167	2013 EB_{123}	—	March 21, 2002	Kitt Peak	Spacewatch	·	3.5 km	MPC · JPL
446168	2013 EO_{123}	—	December 13, 2004	Kitt Peak	Spacewatch	·	1.1 km	MPC · JPL
446169	2013 EP_{124}	—	November 4, 2004	Catalina	CSS	·	1.1 km	MPC · JPL
446170	2013 EQ_{124}	—	March 30, 2008	Kitt Peak	Spacewatch	·	3.8 km	MPC · JPL
446171	2013 ED_{125}	—	April 14, 2008	Kitt Peak	Spacewatch	·	1.9 km	MPC · JPL
446172	2013 ED_{126}	—	February 8, 2007	Mount Lemmon	Mount Lemmon Survey	·	3.3 km	MPC · JPL
446173	2013 EC_{128}	—	April 25, 2003	Kitt Peak	Spacewatch	EOS	4.6 km	MPC · JPL
446174	2013 EX_{133}	—	September 30, 2005	Mount Lemmon	Mount Lemmon Survey	KOR	1.1 km	MPC · JPL
446175	2013 ER_{143}	—	October 24, 2011	Mount Lemmon	Mount Lemmon Survey	AGN	880 m	MPC · JPL
446176	2013 FD_{2}	—	April 7, 2008	Mount Lemmon	Mount Lemmon Survey	EOS	1.6 km	MPC · JPL
446177	2013 FN_{2}	—	April 13, 2008	Mount Lemmon	Mount Lemmon Survey	·	3.2 km	MPC · JPL
446178	2013 FC_{6}	—	July 6, 2010	WISE	WISE	·	3.6 km	MPC · JPL
446179	2013 FE_{7}	—	February 13, 2008	Mount Lemmon	Mount Lemmon Survey	MRX	1.1 km	MPC · JPL
446180	2013 FS_{9}	—	March 11, 2013	Mount Lemmon	Mount Lemmon Survey	·	2.9 km	MPC · JPL
446181	2013 FL_{10}	—	January 28, 2007	Kitt Peak	Spacewatch	THM	2.2 km	MPC · JPL
446182	2013 FQ_{11}	—	October 19, 2006	Kitt Peak	Spacewatch	AGN	1.1 km	MPC · JPL
446183	2013 FR_{11}	—	October 3, 2010	Kitt Peak	Spacewatch	·	2.4 km	MPC · JPL
446184	2013 FZ_{15}	—	March 10, 2007	Mount Lemmon	Mount Lemmon Survey	·	3.1 km	MPC · JPL
446185	2013 FF_{17}	—	January 27, 2007	Mount Lemmon	Mount Lemmon Survey	·	2.5 km	MPC · JPL
446186	2013 FM_{17}	—	September 26, 2005	Kitt Peak	Spacewatch	KOR	1.3 km	MPC · JPL
446187	2013 FV_{17}	—	September 30, 2006	Mount Lemmon	Mount Lemmon Survey	·	2.3 km	MPC · JPL
446188	2013 FX_{18}	—	March 31, 2013	Mount Lemmon	Mount Lemmon Survey	·	4.0 km	MPC · JPL
446189	2013 FA_{20}	—	October 27, 2005	Kitt Peak	Spacewatch	·	2.5 km	MPC · JPL
446190	2013 FM_{20}	—	November 30, 2005	Kitt Peak	Spacewatch	·	3.0 km	MPC · JPL
446191	2013 FB_{23}	—	October 13, 2006	Kitt Peak	Spacewatch	·	1.8 km	MPC · JPL
446192	2013 FQ_{25}	—	March 31, 2009	Mount Lemmon	Mount Lemmon Survey	·	2.0 km	MPC · JPL
446193	2013 FZ_{26}	—	September 7, 2004	Kitt Peak	Spacewatch	·	2.4 km	MPC · JPL
446194	2013 FC_{27}	—	March 27, 2009	Mount Lemmon	Mount Lemmon Survey	·	1.7 km	MPC · JPL
446195	2013 FJ_{27}	—	December 29, 2011	Mount Lemmon	Mount Lemmon Survey	·	2.3 km	MPC · JPL
446196	2013 GL	—	April 17, 2005	Kitt Peak	Spacewatch	·	1.5 km	MPC · JPL
446197	2013 GN	—	December 24, 2005	Kitt Peak	Spacewatch	·	3.0 km	MPC · JPL
446198	2013 GS	—	February 29, 2000	Socorro	LINEAR	·	1.5 km	MPC · JPL
446199	2013 GU_{1}	—	October 26, 2001	Kitt Peak	Spacewatch	HOF	2.7 km	MPC · JPL
446200	2013 GG_{2}	—	November 3, 2005	Mount Lemmon	Mount Lemmon Survey	·	2.9 km	MPC · JPL

== 446201–446300 ==
back to top

Designation			Discovery			Properties		Ref
Permanent	Provisional	Named after	Date	Site	Discoverer(s)	Category	Diam.	Ref
446201	2013 GK_{5}	—	December 16, 2007	Mount Lemmon	Mount Lemmon Survey	NEM	2.2 km	MPC · JPL
446202	2013 GA_{6}	—	March 5, 2008	Mount Lemmon	Mount Lemmon Survey	·	2.4 km	MPC · JPL
446203	2013 GW_{9}	—	October 27, 2005	Kitt Peak	Spacewatch	·	2.8 km	MPC · JPL
446204	2013 GW_{14}	—	September 6, 1996	Kitt Peak	Spacewatch	HOF	2.6 km	MPC · JPL
446205	2013 GA_{17}	—	April 28, 2004	Kitt Peak	Spacewatch	AST	3.2 km	MPC · JPL
446206	2013 GJ_{17}	—	May 28, 2003	Kitt Peak	Spacewatch	EOS	2.2 km	MPC · JPL
446207	2013 GD_{24}	—	November 7, 2010	Mount Lemmon	Mount Lemmon Survey	·	3.0 km	MPC · JPL
446208	2013 GE_{24}	—	March 8, 2008	Kitt Peak	Spacewatch	·	2.3 km	MPC · JPL
446209	2013 GH_{29}	—	March 16, 2004	Kitt Peak	Spacewatch	AEO	1.1 km	MPC · JPL
446210	2013 GF_{31}	—	December 16, 2007	Catalina	CSS	·	3.1 km	MPC · JPL
446211	2013 GA_{36}	—	March 31, 2009	Kitt Peak	Spacewatch	RAF	930 m	MPC · JPL
446212	2013 GD_{41}	—	March 23, 2004	Kitt Peak	Spacewatch	·	2.3 km	MPC · JPL
446213	2013 GL_{45}	—	February 23, 2007	Kitt Peak	Spacewatch	·	2.6 km	MPC · JPL
446214	2013 GD_{50}	—	March 12, 2007	Kitt Peak	Spacewatch	·	3.1 km	MPC · JPL
446215	2013 GN_{50}	—	February 6, 1997	Kitt Peak	Spacewatch	·	2.3 km	MPC · JPL
446216	2013 GU_{50}	—	September 29, 2011	Mount Lemmon	Mount Lemmon Survey	ADE	1.8 km	MPC · JPL
446217	2013 GU_{52}	—	December 4, 2005	Kitt Peak	Spacewatch	·	2.6 km	MPC · JPL
446218	2013 GA_{56}	—	November 22, 2005	Kitt Peak	Spacewatch	·	2.5 km	MPC · JPL
446219	2013 GB_{56}	—	January 17, 2007	Kitt Peak	Spacewatch	·	2.4 km	MPC · JPL
446220	2013 GG_{56}	—	January 29, 2007	Kitt Peak	Spacewatch	·	2.4 km	MPC · JPL
446221	2013 GQ_{58}	—	April 12, 2005	Kitt Peak	Spacewatch	·	1.5 km	MPC · JPL
446222	2013 GL_{60}	—	January 28, 2007	Mount Lemmon	Mount Lemmon Survey	·	2.1 km	MPC · JPL
446223	2013 GJ_{64}	—	November 30, 2005	Mount Lemmon	Mount Lemmon Survey	·	3.0 km	MPC · JPL
446224	2013 GT_{69}	—	November 10, 1996	Kitt Peak	Spacewatch	KOR	1.8 km	MPC · JPL
446225	2013 GF_{75}	—	September 19, 2006	Kitt Peak	Spacewatch	·	1.5 km	MPC · JPL
446226	2013 GP_{77}	—	October 4, 1999	Kitt Peak	Spacewatch	·	2.6 km	MPC · JPL
446227	2013 GM_{87}	—	March 13, 2007	Kitt Peak	Spacewatch	·	3.9 km	MPC · JPL
446228	2013 GW_{88}	—	April 17, 1996	Kitt Peak	Spacewatch	·	2.9 km	MPC · JPL
446229	2013 GH_{94}	—	May 3, 2008	Mount Lemmon	Mount Lemmon Survey	·	3.0 km	MPC · JPL
446230	2013 GQ_{100}	—	November 30, 2005	Kitt Peak	Spacewatch	·	3.1 km	MPC · JPL
446231	2013 GA_{106}	—	March 28, 2008	Mount Lemmon	Mount Lemmon Survey	·	2.1 km	MPC · JPL
446232	2013 GR_{106}	—	September 19, 2006	Kitt Peak	Spacewatch	·	1.6 km	MPC · JPL
446233	2013 GH_{108}	—	October 25, 2005	Kitt Peak	Spacewatch	EOS	2.1 km	MPC · JPL
446234	2013 GG_{115}	—	August 25, 2004	Kitt Peak	Spacewatch	·	2.7 km	MPC · JPL
446235	2013 GQ_{115}	—	November 11, 2010	Catalina	CSS	·	3.1 km	MPC · JPL
446236	2013 GG_{118}	—	October 12, 2004	Kitt Peak	Spacewatch	·	3.1 km	MPC · JPL
446237	2013 GL_{118}	—	February 27, 2007	Kitt Peak	Spacewatch	THM	2.3 km	MPC · JPL
446238	2013 GV_{121}	—	October 19, 2006	Catalina	CSS	·	2.1 km	MPC · JPL
446239	2013 GV_{127}	—	September 10, 2004	Kitt Peak	Spacewatch	·	2.7 km	MPC · JPL
446240	2013 GO_{129}	—	May 2, 2008	Catalina	CSS	·	4.2 km	MPC · JPL
446241	2013 HW_{4}	—	March 13, 2008	Catalina	CSS	·	3.4 km	MPC · JPL
446242	2013 HY_{8}	—	June 23, 2009	Mount Lemmon	Mount Lemmon Survey	·	3.8 km	MPC · JPL
446243	2013 HY_{9}	—	November 25, 2005	Catalina	CSS	·	3.0 km	MPC · JPL
446244	2013 HE_{17}	—	October 28, 2010	Kitt Peak	Spacewatch	·	3.9 km	MPC · JPL
446245	2013 HG_{33}	—	December 13, 2006	Kitt Peak	Spacewatch	·	2.2 km	MPC · JPL
446246	2013 HT_{35}	—	October 1, 2003	Kitt Peak	Spacewatch	CYB	3.4 km	MPC · JPL
446247	2013 HS_{42}	—	November 3, 2010	Mount Lemmon	Mount Lemmon Survey	·	3.5 km	MPC · JPL
446248	2013 HW_{48}	—	February 23, 2007	Mount Lemmon	Mount Lemmon Survey	·	1.4 km	MPC · JPL
446249	2013 HG_{55}	—	October 11, 2004	Kitt Peak	Spacewatch	VER	2.7 km	MPC · JPL
446250	2013 HU_{57}	—	October 25, 2005	Mount Lemmon	Mount Lemmon Survey	EOS	1.9 km	MPC · JPL
446251	2013 HX_{58}	—	September 4, 2010	Kitt Peak	Spacewatch	·	3.4 km	MPC · JPL
446252	2013 HP_{69}	—	March 12, 2007	Mount Lemmon	Mount Lemmon Survey	·	2.5 km	MPC · JPL
446253	2013 HM_{70}	—	September 15, 2009	Kitt Peak	Spacewatch	·	3.1 km	MPC · JPL
446254	2013 HY_{70}	—	April 24, 2008	Kitt Peak	Spacewatch	·	2.2 km	MPC · JPL
446255	2013 HB_{80}	—	September 17, 2006	Kitt Peak	Spacewatch	·	1.2 km	MPC · JPL
446256	2013 HA_{87}	—	January 10, 2008	Kitt Peak	Spacewatch	·	1.3 km	MPC · JPL
446257	2013 HL_{97}	—	May 28, 2008	Mount Lemmon	Mount Lemmon Survey	·	3.0 km	MPC · JPL
446258	2013 HO_{97}	—	October 5, 2004	Kitt Peak	Spacewatch	·	2.5 km	MPC · JPL
446259	2013 HE_{103}	—	November 11, 2005	Kitt Peak	Spacewatch	·	1.9 km	MPC · JPL
446260	2013 HS_{109}	—	October 24, 2005	Kitt Peak	Spacewatch	THM	1.9 km	MPC · JPL
446261	2013 HU_{144}	—	March 2, 2000	Kitt Peak	Spacewatch	·	1.3 km	MPC · JPL
446262	2013 JU_{10}	—	November 21, 1998	Kitt Peak	Spacewatch	·	2.0 km	MPC · JPL
446263	2013 JC_{33}	—	October 30, 2006	Mount Lemmon	Mount Lemmon Survey	·	4.2 km	MPC · JPL
446264	2013 JK_{50}	—	September 16, 2009	Mount Lemmon	Mount Lemmon Survey	·	2.9 km	MPC · JPL
446265	2013 JQ_{58}	—	November 3, 2011	Kitt Peak	Spacewatch	·	1.1 km	MPC · JPL
446266	2013 KV	—	December 1, 2005	Kitt Peak	Spacewatch	·	3.2 km	MPC · JPL
446267	2013 KD_{14}	—	December 8, 2010	Kitt Peak	Spacewatch	·	3.6 km	MPC · JPL
446268	2013 LD_{32}	—	March 12, 2007	Kitt Peak	Spacewatch	·	3.0 km	MPC · JPL
446269	2013 ST_{20}	—	November 17, 2008	Catalina	CSS	H	600 m	MPC · JPL
446270	2013 YM_{123}	—	February 26, 2011	Kitt Peak	Spacewatch	·	640 m	MPC · JPL
446271	2014 AP_{46}	—	December 6, 2010	Catalina	CSS	H	690 m	MPC · JPL
446272	2014 BA_{6}	—	February 22, 2011	Kitt Peak	Spacewatch	·	550 m	MPC · JPL
446273	2014 BM_{6}	—	February 21, 2007	Kitt Peak	Spacewatch	·	940 m	MPC · JPL
446274	2014 BM_{22}	—	February 25, 2007	Mount Lemmon	Mount Lemmon Survey	NYS	1.0 km	MPC · JPL
446275	2014 BP_{24}	—	October 9, 2005	Kitt Peak	Spacewatch	·	710 m	MPC · JPL
446276	2014 CC_{3}	—	March 23, 2006	Catalina	CSS	H	470 m	MPC · JPL
446277	2014 CW_{13}	—	January 31, 2006	Anderson Mesa	LONEOS	H	620 m	MPC · JPL
446278	2014 DT_{2}	—	October 8, 2007	Catalina	CSS	H	680 m	MPC · JPL
446279	2014 DZ_{15}	—	March 13, 2010	Catalina	CSS	·	1.2 km	MPC · JPL
446280	2014 DM_{21}	—	March 25, 2006	Kitt Peak	Spacewatch	H	630 m	MPC · JPL
446281	2014 DH_{33}	—	March 29, 2004	Kitt Peak	Spacewatch	·	590 m	MPC · JPL
446282	2014 DW_{33}	—	May 28, 2008	Mount Lemmon	Mount Lemmon Survey	·	850 m	MPC · JPL
446283	2014 DB_{35}	—	January 28, 2007	Mount Lemmon	Mount Lemmon Survey	·	650 m	MPC · JPL
446284	2014 DU_{38}	—	February 25, 2007	Mount Lemmon	Mount Lemmon Survey	NYS	1.0 km	MPC · JPL
446285	2014 DU_{41}	—	April 2, 2006	Kitt Peak	Spacewatch	·	1.1 km	MPC · JPL
446286	2014 DK_{57}	—	September 29, 2008	Kitt Peak	Spacewatch	·	1.0 km	MPC · JPL
446287	2014 DF_{59}	—	March 27, 2011	Mount Lemmon	Mount Lemmon Survey	·	740 m	MPC · JPL
446288	2014 DW_{68}	—	April 19, 1998	Kitt Peak	Spacewatch	·	1.3 km	MPC · JPL
446289	2014 DT_{70}	—	March 22, 2004	Socorro	LINEAR	·	740 m	MPC · JPL
446290	2014 DJ_{72}	—	December 20, 2009	Kitt Peak	Spacewatch	·	750 m	MPC · JPL
446291	2014 DN_{100}	—	March 9, 2003	Kitt Peak	Spacewatch	·	1.4 km	MPC · JPL
446292	2014 DK_{106}	—	April 9, 2006	Kitt Peak	Spacewatch	(5)	960 m	MPC · JPL
446293	2014 DJ_{108}	—	March 21, 2010	Kitt Peak	Spacewatch	·	1.3 km	MPC · JPL
446294	2014 DG_{109}	—	October 26, 2008	Kitt Peak	Spacewatch	·	1.7 km	MPC · JPL
446295	2014 DC_{111}	—	January 2, 2009	Mount Lemmon	Mount Lemmon Survey	·	1.6 km	MPC · JPL
446296	2014 DC_{121}	—	April 18, 2007	Kitt Peak	Spacewatch	NYS	1.1 km	MPC · JPL
446297	2014 DE_{121}	—	April 5, 2000	Anderson Mesa	LONEOS	·	770 m	MPC · JPL
446298	2014 DU_{139}	—	February 14, 2010	Mount Lemmon	Mount Lemmon Survey	EUN	1.1 km	MPC · JPL
446299	2014 EH_{4}	—	May 26, 2009	Mount Lemmon	Mount Lemmon Survey	·	2.6 km	MPC · JPL
446300	2014 EE_{7}	—	March 16, 2007	Kitt Peak	Spacewatch	·	900 m	MPC · JPL

== 446301–446400 ==
back to top

Designation			Discovery			Properties		Ref
Permanent	Provisional	Named after	Date	Site	Discoverer(s)	Category	Diam.	Ref
446301	2014 ED_{8}	—	February 21, 2007	Kitt Peak	Spacewatch	·	740 m	MPC · JPL
446302	2014 EJ_{10}	—	April 19, 2007	Mount Lemmon	Mount Lemmon Survey	NYS	850 m	MPC · JPL
446303	2014 EC_{14}	—	June 26, 2011	Mount Lemmon	Mount Lemmon Survey	NYS	1.2 km	MPC · JPL
446304	2014 EN_{14}	—	August 28, 2005	Kitt Peak	Spacewatch	·	700 m	MPC · JPL
446305	2014 EH_{17}	—	May 6, 2010	Catalina	CSS	·	2.2 km	MPC · JPL
446306	2014 EB_{28}	—	January 25, 2007	Kitt Peak	Spacewatch	·	690 m	MPC · JPL
446307	2014 EB_{47}	—	March 19, 2007	Mount Lemmon	Mount Lemmon Survey	·	1.1 km	MPC · JPL
446308	2014 EN_{49}	—	October 24, 2005	Kitt Peak	Spacewatch	MAS	820 m	MPC · JPL
446309	2014 EL_{51}	—	April 11, 2007	Kitt Peak	Spacewatch	·	850 m	MPC · JPL
446310	2014 FU_{6}	—	January 28, 2011	Catalina	CSS	H	850 m	MPC · JPL
446311	2014 FC_{10}	—	September 14, 2007	Mount Lemmon	Mount Lemmon Survey	RAF	780 m	MPC · JPL
446312	2014 FT_{12}	—	March 10, 2007	Mount Lemmon	Mount Lemmon Survey	·	630 m	MPC · JPL
446313	2014 FF_{15}	—	March 26, 2003	Kitt Peak	Spacewatch	MAS	680 m	MPC · JPL
446314	2014 FJ_{17}	—	December 25, 2005	Mount Lemmon	Mount Lemmon Survey	·	1.2 km	MPC · JPL
446315	2014 FL_{17}	—	October 30, 2008	Kitt Peak	Spacewatch	·	1.7 km	MPC · JPL
446316	2014 FU_{20}	—	October 16, 2012	Mount Lemmon	Mount Lemmon Survey	·	650 m	MPC · JPL
446317	2014 FT_{22}	—	July 25, 2008	Siding Spring	SSS	·	810 m	MPC · JPL
446318	2014 FH_{32}	—	September 12, 2007	Mount Lemmon	Mount Lemmon Survey	·	820 m	MPC · JPL
446319	2014 FC_{35}	—	September 13, 2007	Mount Lemmon	Mount Lemmon Survey	·	1.1 km	MPC · JPL
446320	2014 FK_{36}	—	September 14, 2005	Catalina	CSS	·	890 m	MPC · JPL
446321	2014 FH_{37}	—	March 23, 2003	Kitt Peak	Spacewatch	NYS	1.0 km	MPC · JPL
446322	2014 FM_{37}	—	April 8, 2003	Kitt Peak	Spacewatch	·	1.0 km	MPC · JPL
446323	2014 FJ_{41}	—	March 14, 2005	Mount Lemmon	Mount Lemmon Survey	·	1.5 km	MPC · JPL
446324	2014 FC_{49}	—	January 22, 2010	WISE	WISE	·	2.1 km	MPC · JPL
446325	2014 FK_{50}	—	May 4, 2010	Catalina	CSS	·	1.5 km	MPC · JPL
446326	2014 FW_{63}	—	September 30, 2005	Mount Lemmon	Mount Lemmon Survey	·	760 m	MPC · JPL
446327	2014 FX_{63}	—	February 21, 2007	Mount Lemmon	Mount Lemmon Survey	NYS	1.1 km	MPC · JPL
446328	2014 FJ_{64}	—	December 6, 2005	Kitt Peak	Spacewatch	·	970 m	MPC · JPL
446329	2014 FP_{64}	—	March 20, 2001	Anderson Mesa	LONEOS	H	560 m	MPC · JPL
446330	2014 FW_{65}	—	December 2, 2005	Kitt Peak	Spacewatch	NYS	1.1 km	MPC · JPL
446331	2014 FY_{65}	—	March 20, 2010	Mount Lemmon	Mount Lemmon Survey	·	1.3 km	MPC · JPL
446332	2014 FB_{66}	—	January 30, 2006	Kitt Peak	Spacewatch	PHO	1.2 km	MPC · JPL
446333	2014 GT_{1}	—	September 13, 2007	Mount Lemmon	Mount Lemmon Survey	·	1.0 km	MPC · JPL
446334	2014 GN_{12}	—	July 1, 2011	Mount Lemmon	Mount Lemmon Survey	·	750 m	MPC · JPL
446335	2014 GF_{16}	—	October 21, 1995	Kitt Peak	Spacewatch	·	1.3 km	MPC · JPL
446336	2014 GQ_{16}	—	March 8, 2008	Catalina	CSS	·	2.9 km	MPC · JPL
446337	2014 GB_{29}	—	October 4, 2004	Kitt Peak	Spacewatch	THB	2.9 km	MPC · JPL
446338	2014 GQ_{33}	—	December 20, 2009	Mount Lemmon	Mount Lemmon Survey	NYS	970 m	MPC · JPL
446339	2014 GS_{35}	—	October 13, 2005	Kitt Peak	Spacewatch	·	2.1 km	MPC · JPL
446340	2014 GT_{38}	—	February 21, 2007	Kitt Peak	Spacewatch	·	820 m	MPC · JPL
446341	2014 GR_{40}	—	March 23, 2003	Kitt Peak	Spacewatch	·	2.2 km	MPC · JPL
446342	2014 GL_{46}	—	July 6, 1997	Kitt Peak	Spacewatch	·	1.4 km	MPC · JPL
446343	2014 GE_{47}	—	December 5, 2005	Kitt Peak	Spacewatch	NYS	1.0 km	MPC · JPL
446344	2014 GA_{49}	—	September 12, 2007	Catalina	CSS	H	680 m	MPC · JPL
446345	2014 HA_{4}	—	September 2, 2008	Kitt Peak	Spacewatch	·	950 m	MPC · JPL
446346	2014 HQ_{5}	—	December 5, 2005	Mount Lemmon	Mount Lemmon Survey	MAS	610 m	MPC · JPL
446347	2014 HZ_{7}	—	February 11, 2008	Mount Lemmon	Mount Lemmon Survey	·	3.3 km	MPC · JPL
446348	2014 HF_{8}	—	May 19, 2010	Catalina	CSS	EUN	1.1 km	MPC · JPL
446349	2014 HM_{9}	—	February 16, 2010	Kitt Peak	Spacewatch	MAS	590 m	MPC · JPL
446350	2014 HJ_{10}	—	October 21, 2006	Mount Lemmon	Mount Lemmon Survey	KOR	1.1 km	MPC · JPL
446351	2014 HQ_{11}	—	December 1, 2005	Mount Lemmon	Mount Lemmon Survey	·	690 m	MPC · JPL
446352	2014 HB_{12}	—	February 10, 2010	Kitt Peak	Spacewatch	NYS	960 m	MPC · JPL
446353	2014 HN_{13}	—	March 18, 2010	Kitt Peak	Spacewatch	·	1.6 km	MPC · JPL
446354	2014 HS_{13}	—	March 20, 2010	Kitt Peak	Spacewatch	·	1.5 km	MPC · JPL
446355	2014 HT_{19}	—	March 22, 2014	Kitt Peak	Spacewatch	·	2.3 km	MPC · JPL
446356	2014 HP_{20}	—	May 8, 2005	Mount Lemmon	Mount Lemmon Survey	·	1.8 km	MPC · JPL
446357	2014 HG_{21}	—	December 15, 2007	Mount Lemmon	Mount Lemmon Survey	AGN	1.2 km	MPC · JPL
446358	2014 HM_{22}	—	January 19, 2012	Mount Lemmon	Mount Lemmon Survey	·	2.8 km	MPC · JPL
446359	2014 HL_{23}	—	March 12, 2010	Catalina	CSS	PHO	1.0 km	MPC · JPL
446360	2014 HA_{24}	—	May 16, 2010	Kitt Peak	Spacewatch	·	1.0 km	MPC · JPL
446361	2014 HH_{24}	—	July 2, 2011	Mount Lemmon	Mount Lemmon Survey	·	1.3 km	MPC · JPL
446362	2014 HW_{24}	—	March 18, 2010	Mount Lemmon	Mount Lemmon Survey	·	1.0 km	MPC · JPL
446363	2014 HU_{26}	—	October 27, 2008	Kitt Peak	Spacewatch	·	1.0 km	MPC · JPL
446364	2014 HH_{28}	—	March 13, 2005	Kitt Peak	Spacewatch	·	1.7 km	MPC · JPL
446365	2014 HG_{32}	—	November 13, 2007	Kitt Peak	Spacewatch	MIS	2.7 km	MPC · JPL
446366	2014 HR_{34}	—	April 6, 2014	Kitt Peak	Spacewatch	·	1.6 km	MPC · JPL
446367	2014 HW_{34}	—	September 15, 2007	Mount Lemmon	Mount Lemmon Survey	V	680 m	MPC · JPL
446368	2014 HX_{37}	—	April 20, 2007	Kitt Peak	Spacewatch	V	700 m	MPC · JPL
446369	2014 HW_{38}	—	April 29, 2003	Kitt Peak	Spacewatch	·	2.8 km	MPC · JPL
446370	2014 HC_{40}	—	June 28, 2005	Kitt Peak	Spacewatch	GEF	1.1 km	MPC · JPL
446371	2014 HE_{41}	—	January 18, 2013	Mount Lemmon	Mount Lemmon Survey	HOF	2.2 km	MPC · JPL
446372	2014 HO_{44}	—	October 20, 2007	Kitt Peak	Spacewatch	·	1.5 km	MPC · JPL
446373	2014 HS_{44}	—	January 23, 2006	Kitt Peak	Spacewatch	NYS	1.0 km	MPC · JPL
446374	2014 HH_{50}	—	October 10, 1996	Kitt Peak	Spacewatch	·	2.3 km	MPC · JPL
446375	2014 HP_{55}	—	October 8, 2007	Mount Lemmon	Mount Lemmon Survey	·	1.4 km	MPC · JPL
446376	2014 HP_{72}	—	May 21, 2006	Mount Lemmon	Mount Lemmon Survey	·	1.1 km	MPC · JPL
446377	2014 HK_{109}	—	February 12, 2004	Kitt Peak	Spacewatch	·	2.1 km	MPC · JPL
446378	2014 HK_{123}	—	February 14, 2010	Kitt Peak	Spacewatch	·	1.5 km	MPC · JPL
446379	2014 HJ_{128}	—	January 18, 2008	Kitt Peak	Spacewatch	H	710 m	MPC · JPL
446380	2014 HR_{131}	—	January 28, 2009	Kitt Peak	Spacewatch	·	1.8 km	MPC · JPL
446381	2014 HW_{136}	—	December 21, 2008	Catalina	CSS	·	1.1 km	MPC · JPL
446382	2014 HK_{138}	—	October 28, 2008	Kitt Peak	Spacewatch	NYS	1.1 km	MPC · JPL
446383	2014 HV_{138}	—	March 8, 2005	Mount Lemmon	Mount Lemmon Survey	·	1.1 km	MPC · JPL
446384	2014 HZ_{152}	—	September 24, 2000	Socorro	LINEAR	·	1.4 km	MPC · JPL
446385	2014 HQ_{153}	—	October 19, 2006	Kitt Peak	Spacewatch	KOR	1.2 km	MPC · JPL
446386	2014 HH_{155}	—	July 10, 2010	WISE	WISE	·	2.4 km	MPC · JPL
446387	2014 HK_{159}	—	March 27, 2008	Mount Lemmon	Mount Lemmon Survey	·	2.2 km	MPC · JPL
446388	2014 HT_{162}	—	February 15, 2010	Mount Lemmon	Mount Lemmon Survey	·	1.1 km	MPC · JPL
446389	2014 HA_{169}	—	September 18, 2003	Kitt Peak	Spacewatch	·	920 m	MPC · JPL
446390	2014 HD_{175}	—	November 17, 2011	Kitt Peak	Spacewatch	·	2.1 km	MPC · JPL
446391	2014 HL_{175}	—	March 1, 2005	Kitt Peak	Spacewatch	·	1.6 km	MPC · JPL
446392	2014 HS_{175}	—	February 2, 2001	Kitt Peak	Spacewatch	·	1.3 km	MPC · JPL
446393	2014 HW_{175}	—	March 24, 2003	Kitt Peak	Spacewatch	·	1 km	MPC · JPL
446394	2014 HP_{176}	—	June 10, 2010	Mount Lemmon	Mount Lemmon Survey	·	2.0 km	MPC · JPL
446395	2014 HU_{178}	—	October 23, 2006	Mount Lemmon	Mount Lemmon Survey	(18466)	2.3 km	MPC · JPL
446396	2014 HR_{179}	—	November 7, 2007	Kitt Peak	Spacewatch	·	1.3 km	MPC · JPL
446397	2014 HR_{182}	—	February 16, 2010	Mount Lemmon	Mount Lemmon Survey	·	1.2 km	MPC · JPL
446398	2014 HQ_{183}	—	November 30, 2011	Kitt Peak	Spacewatch	·	2.3 km	MPC · JPL
446399	2014 HR_{183}	—	November 23, 1997	Kitt Peak	Spacewatch	·	1.6 km	MPC · JPL
446400	2014 HD_{185}	—	September 30, 2011	Kitt Peak	Spacewatch	·	1.3 km	MPC · JPL

== 446401–446500 ==
back to top

Designation			Discovery			Properties		Ref
Permanent	Provisional	Named after	Date	Site	Discoverer(s)	Category	Diam.	Ref
446401	2014 HW_{185}	—	October 6, 2004	Kitt Peak	Spacewatch	·	1.3 km	MPC · JPL
446402	2014 HV_{189}	—	October 9, 2010	Mount Lemmon	Mount Lemmon Survey	·	2.0 km	MPC · JPL
446403	2014 HB_{190}	—	November 18, 2007	Kitt Peak	Spacewatch	·	1.8 km	MPC · JPL
446404	2014 HT_{194}	—	April 25, 2003	Kitt Peak	Spacewatch	·	1.6 km	MPC · JPL
446405	2014 HY_{194}	—	March 3, 2005	Catalina	CSS	·	3.0 km	MPC · JPL
446406	2014 HD_{195}	—	September 11, 2007	Mount Lemmon	Mount Lemmon Survey	·	2.8 km	MPC · JPL
446407	2014 JN	—	May 18, 2005	Siding Spring	SSS	·	3.1 km	MPC · JPL
446408	2014 JA_{1}	—	February 8, 2002	Kitt Peak	Spacewatch	HYG	2.8 km	MPC · JPL
446409	2014 JY_{1}	—	October 26, 2008	Mount Lemmon	Mount Lemmon Survey	·	780 m	MPC · JPL
446410	2014 JJ_{2}	—	January 22, 2006	Mount Lemmon	Mount Lemmon Survey	·	1.2 km	MPC · JPL
446411	2014 JF_{3}	—	November 2, 2011	Kitt Peak	Spacewatch	·	1.8 km	MPC · JPL
446412	2014 JP_{3}	—	February 28, 2009	Kitt Peak	Spacewatch	WIT	960 m	MPC · JPL
446413	2014 JU_{4}	—	August 11, 2009	Siding Spring	SSS	·	3.7 km	MPC · JPL
446414	2014 JM_{6}	—	October 6, 1999	Kitt Peak	Spacewatch	·	1.4 km	MPC · JPL
446415	2014 JD_{9}	—	February 12, 2008	Kitt Peak	Spacewatch	·	1.8 km	MPC · JPL
446416	2014 JS_{11}	—	February 15, 2010	Kitt Peak	Spacewatch	·	1.1 km	MPC · JPL
446417	2014 JV_{12}	—	January 30, 2008	Mount Lemmon	Mount Lemmon Survey	·	1.5 km	MPC · JPL
446418	2014 JQ_{14}	—	November 8, 2007	Kitt Peak	Spacewatch	·	2.0 km	MPC · JPL
446419	2014 JG_{16}	—	March 1, 2008	Kitt Peak	Spacewatch	·	2.9 km	MPC · JPL
446420	2014 JR_{20}	—	November 4, 2005	Kitt Peak	Spacewatch	·	810 m	MPC · JPL
446421	2014 JM_{22}	—	March 1, 2008	Kitt Peak	Spacewatch	·	2.1 km	MPC · JPL
446422	2014 JD_{23}	—	December 21, 2012	Mount Lemmon	Mount Lemmon Survey	·	1.6 km	MPC · JPL
446423	2014 JE_{26}	—	March 11, 2005	Mount Lemmon	Mount Lemmon Survey	·	1.4 km	MPC · JPL
446424	2014 JZ_{27}	—	March 11, 2005	Mount Lemmon	Mount Lemmon Survey	·	2.0 km	MPC · JPL
446425	2014 JC_{28}	—	July 4, 2010	Mount Lemmon	Mount Lemmon Survey	·	1.8 km	MPC · JPL
446426	2014 JV_{28}	—	May 5, 2014	Mount Lemmon	Mount Lemmon Survey	·	2.1 km	MPC · JPL
446427	2014 JC_{32}	—	February 9, 2008	Kitt Peak	Spacewatch	·	1.9 km	MPC · JPL
446428	2014 JH_{32}	—	April 11, 2005	Mount Lemmon	Mount Lemmon Survey	·	1.5 km	MPC · JPL
446429	2014 JE_{35}	—	October 1, 2006	Kitt Peak	Spacewatch	·	3.1 km	MPC · JPL
446430	2014 JG_{35}	—	March 24, 2006	Kitt Peak	Spacewatch	·	1.5 km	MPC · JPL
446431	2014 JH_{35}	—	February 22, 2009	Kitt Peak	Spacewatch	·	1.5 km	MPC · JPL
446432	2014 JA_{36}	—	March 27, 2004	Catalina	CSS	·	810 m	MPC · JPL
446433	2014 JH_{36}	—	November 15, 2011	Mount Lemmon	Mount Lemmon Survey	·	1.7 km	MPC · JPL
446434	2014 JK_{36}	—	January 20, 2009	Mount Lemmon	Mount Lemmon Survey	·	1.2 km	MPC · JPL
446435	2014 JX_{39}	—	August 19, 2006	Kitt Peak	Spacewatch	·	1.6 km	MPC · JPL
446436	2014 JY_{39}	—	February 1, 2003	Kitt Peak	Spacewatch	·	1.9 km	MPC · JPL
446437	2014 JD_{42}	—	January 20, 2008	Kitt Peak	Spacewatch	·	2.1 km	MPC · JPL
446438	2014 JJ_{43}	—	May 25, 2003	Kitt Peak	Spacewatch	·	3.1 km	MPC · JPL
446439	2014 JT_{43}	—	March 1, 2009	Kitt Peak	Spacewatch	·	1.8 km	MPC · JPL
446440	2014 JU_{44}	—	February 28, 2010	WISE	WISE	·	2.3 km	MPC · JPL
446441	2014 JA_{45}	—	January 5, 2013	Kitt Peak	Spacewatch	KOR	1.1 km	MPC · JPL
446442	2014 JG_{45}	—	May 14, 2004	Kitt Peak	Spacewatch	·	760 m	MPC · JPL
446443	2014 JZ_{45}	—	December 30, 2008	Kitt Peak	Spacewatch	·	1.1 km	MPC · JPL
446444	2014 JL_{47}	—	February 14, 2013	Kitt Peak	Spacewatch	·	2.1 km	MPC · JPL
446445	2014 JQ_{48}	—	May 20, 2010	Mount Lemmon	Mount Lemmon Survey	·	2.4 km	MPC · JPL
446446	2014 JE_{49}	—	May 7, 2010	WISE	WISE	·	3.1 km	MPC · JPL
446447	2014 JN_{58}	—	May 17, 2010	Kitt Peak	Spacewatch	MAR	1.0 km	MPC · JPL
446448	2014 JE_{59}	—	May 10, 2007	Mount Lemmon	Mount Lemmon Survey	·	750 m	MPC · JPL
446449	2014 JU_{61}	—	January 2, 2012	Mount Lemmon	Mount Lemmon Survey	·	2.8 km	MPC · JPL
446450	2014 JM_{62}	—	March 1, 2009	Kitt Peak	Spacewatch	·	2.0 km	MPC · JPL
446451	2014 JN_{63}	—	June 23, 2009	Mount Lemmon	Mount Lemmon Survey	·	2.8 km	MPC · JPL
446452	2014 JW_{63}	—	January 19, 2005	Kitt Peak	Spacewatch	·	1.2 km	MPC · JPL
446453	2014 JA_{64}	—	March 27, 2003	Kitt Peak	Spacewatch	MAS	730 m	MPC · JPL
446454	2014 JR_{64}	—	December 12, 2012	Kitt Peak	Spacewatch	·	1.6 km	MPC · JPL
446455	2014 JZ_{64}	—	December 25, 2005	Kitt Peak	Spacewatch	·	1.3 km	MPC · JPL
446456	2014 JP_{67}	—	September 12, 2007	Mount Lemmon	Mount Lemmon Survey	·	1.8 km	MPC · JPL
446457	2014 JW_{67}	—	December 31, 2008	Kitt Peak	Spacewatch	·	970 m	MPC · JPL
446458	2014 JK_{68}	—	December 4, 2007	Kitt Peak	Spacewatch	·	2.3 km	MPC · JPL
446459	2014 JV_{68}	—	March 3, 2009	Mount Lemmon	Mount Lemmon Survey	·	2.1 km	MPC · JPL
446460	2014 JU_{69}	—	October 21, 2011	Mount Lemmon	Mount Lemmon Survey	EUN	1.2 km	MPC · JPL
446461	2014 JM_{70}	—	May 24, 2000	Kitt Peak	Spacewatch	·	1.8 km	MPC · JPL
446462	2014 JA_{71}	—	February 2, 2008	Kitt Peak	Spacewatch	·	2.0 km	MPC · JPL
446463	2014 JF_{72}	—	September 19, 2011	Mount Lemmon	Mount Lemmon Survey	·	1.6 km	MPC · JPL
446464	2014 JK_{72}	—	October 19, 2006	Kitt Peak	Spacewatch	·	2.1 km	MPC · JPL
446465	2014 JA_{74}	—	September 17, 2006	Kitt Peak	Spacewatch	·	1.6 km	MPC · JPL
446466	2014 JT_{74}	—	April 18, 2009	Kitt Peak	Spacewatch	AST	1.6 km	MPC · JPL
446467	2014 JZ_{74}	—	January 31, 1997	Kitt Peak	Spacewatch	·	1.1 km	MPC · JPL
446468	2014 JL_{75}	—	June 15, 2007	Kitt Peak	Spacewatch	·	1.0 km	MPC · JPL
446469	2014 JY_{78}	—	April 22, 2010	WISE	WISE	·	3.4 km	MPC · JPL
446470	2014 JF_{79}	—	September 30, 2006	Kitt Peak	Spacewatch	·	3.2 km	MPC · JPL
446471	2014 KA_{1}	—	May 17, 2007	Catalina	CSS	·	830 m	MPC · JPL
446472	2014 KF_{1}	—	January 7, 2010	Mount Lemmon	Mount Lemmon Survey	·	810 m	MPC · JPL
446473	2014 KK_{3}	—	November 13, 2007	Mount Lemmon	Mount Lemmon Survey	·	1.5 km	MPC · JPL
446474	2014 KA_{4}	—	September 16, 2006	Siding Spring	SSS	·	3.4 km	MPC · JPL
446475	2014 KV_{7}	—	November 19, 2008	Kitt Peak	Spacewatch	V	710 m	MPC · JPL
446476	2014 KB_{8}	—	January 24, 2001	Kitt Peak	Spacewatch	·	1.2 km	MPC · JPL
446477	2014 KR_{9}	—	March 25, 2010	Kitt Peak	Spacewatch	·	1.2 km	MPC · JPL
446478	2014 KX_{16}	—	September 17, 2006	Catalina	CSS	·	1.9 km	MPC · JPL
446479	2014 KU_{17}	—	November 3, 2007	Kitt Peak	Spacewatch	·	1.9 km	MPC · JPL
446480	2014 KX_{18}	—	July 27, 2010	WISE	WISE	·	1.7 km	MPC · JPL
446481	2014 KW_{19}	—	April 21, 2010	WISE	WISE	·	2.0 km	MPC · JPL
446482	2014 KY_{19}	—	April 21, 2014	Kitt Peak	Spacewatch	·	1.6 km	MPC · JPL
446483	2014 KZ_{28}	—	November 7, 2008	Mount Lemmon	Mount Lemmon Survey	·	1.3 km	MPC · JPL
446484	2014 KB_{29}	—	November 17, 2007	Mount Lemmon	Mount Lemmon Survey	·	1.7 km	MPC · JPL
446485	2014 KG_{29}	—	April 16, 2007	Mount Lemmon	Mount Lemmon Survey	·	750 m	MPC · JPL
446486	2014 KY_{30}	—	February 27, 2006	Kitt Peak	Spacewatch	·	1.3 km	MPC · JPL
446487	2014 KH_{34}	—	June 19, 2006	Mount Lemmon	Mount Lemmon Survey	·	2.6 km	MPC · JPL
446488	2014 KG_{38}	—	January 17, 2009	Kitt Peak	Spacewatch	·	2.0 km	MPC · JPL
446489	2014 KS_{39}	—	January 4, 2012	Mount Lemmon	Mount Lemmon Survey	·	3.0 km	MPC · JPL
446490	2014 KO_{43}	—	August 21, 2004	Catalina	CSS	·	2.5 km	MPC · JPL
446491	2014 KD_{48}	—	November 1, 1999	Kitt Peak	Spacewatch	·	1.5 km	MPC · JPL
446492	2014 KX_{51}	—	February 8, 2002	Kitt Peak	Spacewatch	·	2.4 km	MPC · JPL
446493	2014 KJ_{53}	—	September 20, 1998	Kitt Peak	Spacewatch	·	3.0 km	MPC · JPL
446494	2014 KS_{53}	—	April 9, 2010	Kitt Peak	Spacewatch	·	1.4 km	MPC · JPL
446495	2014 KE_{54}	—	October 10, 2010	Mount Lemmon	Mount Lemmon Survey	·	2.7 km	MPC · JPL
446496	2014 KA_{55}	—	June 15, 1999	Kitt Peak	Spacewatch	·	2.1 km	MPC · JPL
446497	2014 KD_{57}	—	January 24, 2007	Mount Lemmon	Mount Lemmon Survey	EOS	1.7 km	MPC · JPL
446498	2014 KL_{57}	—	September 17, 2010	Mount Lemmon	Mount Lemmon Survey	EOS	1.9 km	MPC · JPL
446499	2014 KN_{59}	—	April 7, 2008	Kitt Peak	Spacewatch	VER	2.4 km	MPC · JPL
446500 Katrinraynor	2014 KR_{59}	Katrinraynor	November 5, 2010	Mount Lemmon	Mount Lemmon Survey	·	3.1 km	MPC · JPL

== 446501–446600 ==
back to top

Designation			Discovery			Properties		Ref
Permanent	Provisional	Named after	Date	Site	Discoverer(s)	Category	Diam.	Ref
446501	2014 KO_{65}	—	May 21, 2006	Kitt Peak	Spacewatch	·	1.4 km	MPC · JPL
446502	2014 KW_{66}	—	March 1, 2009	Mount Lemmon	Mount Lemmon Survey	·	1.5 km	MPC · JPL
446503	2014 KC_{67}	—	April 15, 2001	Kitt Peak	Spacewatch	·	1.2 km	MPC · JPL
446504	2014 KF_{67}	—	August 30, 2006	Anderson Mesa	LONEOS	·	1.8 km	MPC · JPL
446505	2014 KH_{69}	—	January 30, 2006	Kitt Peak	Spacewatch	·	1.1 km	MPC · JPL
446506	2014 KY_{69}	—	November 4, 2007	Mount Lemmon	Mount Lemmon Survey	·	1.2 km	MPC · JPL
446507	2014 KC_{71}	—	March 4, 2005	Mount Lemmon	Mount Lemmon Survey	·	1.2 km	MPC · JPL
446508	2014 KZ_{71}	—	January 31, 2009	Mount Lemmon	Mount Lemmon Survey	·	1.1 km	MPC · JPL
446509	2014 KC_{72}	—	September 25, 2005	Kitt Peak	Spacewatch	EMA	3.0 km	MPC · JPL
446510	2014 KD_{73}	—	February 17, 2007	Kitt Peak	Spacewatch	·	2.9 km	MPC · JPL
446511	2014 KP_{81}	—	April 26, 2003	Kitt Peak	Spacewatch	·	920 m	MPC · JPL
446512	2014 KZ_{82}	—	November 14, 1995	Kitt Peak	Spacewatch	EOS	1.9 km	MPC · JPL
446513	2014 KR_{95}	—	September 23, 2011	Catalina	CSS	·	1.4 km	MPC · JPL
446514	2014 KU_{95}	—	May 24, 2007	Mount Lemmon	Mount Lemmon Survey	·	650 m	MPC · JPL
446515	2014 KF_{98}	—	November 30, 2008	Kitt Peak	Spacewatch	·	1.2 km	MPC · JPL
446516	2014 KL_{99}	—	October 25, 2005	Mount Lemmon	Mount Lemmon Survey	·	2.0 km	MPC · JPL
446517	2014 KE_{100}	—	September 24, 2008	Mount Lemmon	Mount Lemmon Survey	·	920 m	MPC · JPL
446518	2014 KJ_{101}	—	December 30, 2008	Mount Lemmon	Mount Lemmon Survey	·	1.4 km	MPC · JPL
446519	2014 LW_{1}	—	September 17, 2006	Anderson Mesa	LONEOS	·	1.8 km	MPC · JPL
446520	2014 LP_{2}	—	November 2, 2007	Kitt Peak	Spacewatch	·	1.7 km	MPC · JPL
446521	2014 LO_{3}	—	October 29, 2011	Kitt Peak	Spacewatch	·	2.0 km	MPC · JPL
446522	2014 LQ_{11}	—	October 18, 2007	Kitt Peak	Spacewatch	·	1.5 km	MPC · JPL
446523	2014 LT_{11}	—	March 5, 2002	Kitt Peak	Spacewatch	THM	2.4 km	MPC · JPL
446524	2014 LX_{12}	—	December 13, 2006	Kitt Peak	Spacewatch	·	3.1 km	MPC · JPL
446525	2014 LC_{13}	—	April 15, 2008	Mount Lemmon	Mount Lemmon Survey	·	4.2 km	MPC · JPL
446526	2014 LG_{13}	—	November 17, 1999	Kitt Peak	Spacewatch	·	1.4 km	MPC · JPL
446527	2014 LO_{18}	—	January 23, 2006	Kitt Peak	Spacewatch	MAS	740 m	MPC · JPL
446528	2014 LF_{23}	—	September 26, 2006	Mount Lemmon	Mount Lemmon Survey	·	1.8 km	MPC · JPL
446529	2014 LJ_{24}	—	March 14, 2004	Kitt Peak	Spacewatch	·	2.3 km	MPC · JPL
446530	2014 ME_{1}	—	November 10, 2005	Mount Lemmon	Mount Lemmon Survey	V	790 m	MPC · JPL
446531	2014 MX_{1}	—	October 9, 2004	Kitt Peak	Spacewatch	·	2.9 km	MPC · JPL
446532	2014 MN_{4}	—	April 20, 2009	Kitt Peak	Spacewatch	·	1.8 km	MPC · JPL
446533	2014 MP_{6}	—	April 4, 2008	Mount Lemmon	Mount Lemmon Survey	·	3.6 km	MPC · JPL
446534	2014 MP_{14}	—	February 6, 2013	Kitt Peak	Spacewatch	·	3.5 km	MPC · JPL
446535	2014 MR_{17}	—	August 15, 2006	Siding Spring	SSS	·	1.9 km	MPC · JPL
446536	2014 MU_{28}	—	August 28, 2009	Catalina	CSS	·	3.7 km	MPC · JPL
446537	2014 MW_{30}	—	April 9, 2010	Mount Lemmon	Mount Lemmon Survey	·	1.2 km	MPC · JPL
446538	2014 MX_{30}	—	May 13, 1997	Kitt Peak	Spacewatch	·	1.7 km	MPC · JPL
446539	2014 MT_{34}	—	September 23, 2008	Kitt Peak	Spacewatch	V	720 m	MPC · JPL
446540	2014 MW_{34}	—	March 1, 2005	Kitt Peak	Spacewatch	·	2.0 km	MPC · JPL
446541	2014 MF_{43}	—	March 7, 2013	Mount Lemmon	Mount Lemmon Survey	·	2.4 km	MPC · JPL
446542	2014 MY_{47}	—	April 1, 2009	Mount Lemmon	Mount Lemmon Survey	·	2.3 km	MPC · JPL
446543	2014 MR_{55}	—	October 25, 2005	Kitt Peak	Spacewatch	·	1.9 km	MPC · JPL
446544	2014 MW_{58}	—	September 10, 2010	Kitt Peak	Spacewatch	·	3.3 km	MPC · JPL
446545	2014 MU_{64}	—	March 31, 2009	Kitt Peak	Spacewatch	·	1.9 km	MPC · JPL
446546	2014 MV_{68}	—	September 27, 2006	Catalina	CSS	·	2.8 km	MPC · JPL
446547	2014 NY_{7}	—	May 3, 2008	Mount Lemmon	Mount Lemmon Survey	·	2.3 km	MPC · JPL
446548	2014 NR_{11}	—	October 22, 2006	Kitt Peak	Spacewatch	HOF	3.3 km	MPC · JPL
446549	2014 NP_{16}	—	November 6, 2005	Kitt Peak	Spacewatch	·	720 m	MPC · JPL
446550	2014 NM_{18}	—	July 7, 2010	Kitt Peak	Spacewatch	·	1.9 km	MPC · JPL
446551	2014 NJ_{26}	—	January 23, 2006	Mount Lemmon	Mount Lemmon Survey	·	2.8 km	MPC · JPL
446552	2014 NC_{31}	—	May 5, 2008	Mount Lemmon	Mount Lemmon Survey	·	2.6 km	MPC · JPL
446553	2014 NY_{32}	—	October 21, 2006	Kitt Peak	Spacewatch	WIT	880 m	MPC · JPL
446554	2014 NG_{45}	—	August 15, 2009	Kitt Peak	Spacewatch	·	2.8 km	MPC · JPL
446555	2014 NM_{65}	—	March 16, 2004	Siding Spring	SSS	·	3.3 km	MPC · JPL
446556	2014 OS_{1}	—	March 22, 2001	Kitt Peak	Spacewatch	EUN	1.4 km	MPC · JPL
446557	2014 OO_{35}	—	December 14, 2010	Mount Lemmon	Mount Lemmon Survey	·	2.7 km	MPC · JPL
446558	2014 OJ_{40}	—	February 12, 2012	Mount Lemmon	Mount Lemmon Survey	·	3.0 km	MPC · JPL
446559	2014 OC_{43}	—	January 21, 2001	Kitt Peak	Spacewatch	·	3.9 km	MPC · JPL
446560	2014 OQ_{46}	—	August 30, 2005	Kitt Peak	Spacewatch	AGN	1.2 km	MPC · JPL
446561	2014 OT_{51}	—	December 25, 2005	Kitt Peak	Spacewatch	·	2.9 km	MPC · JPL
446562	2014 OD_{67}	—	September 25, 1995	Kitt Peak	Spacewatch	KOR	1.2 km	MPC · JPL
446563	2014 OR_{80}	—	January 7, 2006	Kitt Peak	Spacewatch	·	2.8 km	MPC · JPL
446564	2014 OP_{106}	—	December 25, 2011	Mount Lemmon	Mount Lemmon Survey	·	2.7 km	MPC · JPL
446565	2014 OF_{107}	—	December 7, 2005	Kitt Peak	Spacewatch	·	2.9 km	MPC · JPL
446566	2014 OP_{107}	—	October 10, 2001	Kitt Peak	Spacewatch	·	2.4 km	MPC · JPL
446567	2014 OL_{111}	—	February 2, 2012	Kitt Peak	Spacewatch	·	2.9 km	MPC · JPL
446568	2014 ON_{115}	—	February 15, 1994	Kitt Peak	Spacewatch	·	2.3 km	MPC · JPL
446569	2014 OD_{116}	—	July 1, 2010	WISE	WISE	·	3.0 km	MPC · JPL
446570	2014 OX_{119}	—	November 10, 2009	Kitt Peak	Spacewatch	CYB	4.1 km	MPC · JPL
446571	2014 OY_{127}	—	February 2, 2008	Mount Lemmon	Mount Lemmon Survey	·	1.7 km	MPC · JPL
446572	2014 OJ_{130}	—	September 12, 2007	Mount Lemmon	Mount Lemmon Survey	3:2	4.8 km	MPC · JPL
446573	2014 OY_{130}	—	June 23, 2009	Mount Lemmon	Mount Lemmon Survey	·	2.9 km	MPC · JPL
446574	2014 OT_{132}	—	September 18, 2004	Socorro	LINEAR	EOS	1.8 km	MPC · JPL
446575	2014 OQ_{133}	—	November 11, 1999	Kitt Peak	Spacewatch	·	2.3 km	MPC · JPL
446576	2014 OE_{136}	—	January 30, 2006	Kitt Peak	Spacewatch	·	3.2 km	MPC · JPL
446577	2014 OG_{154}	—	December 5, 2005	Kitt Peak	Spacewatch	EOS	2.4 km	MPC · JPL
446578	2014 OJ_{204}	—	September 16, 2010	Kitt Peak	Spacewatch	HOF	2.4 km	MPC · JPL
446579	2014 OV_{213}	—	April 11, 2008	Mount Lemmon	Mount Lemmon Survey	·	2.3 km	MPC · JPL
446580	2014 OF_{217}	—	January 5, 2002	Kitt Peak	Spacewatch	·	2.2 km	MPC · JPL
446581	2014 OM_{223}	—	January 25, 2010	WISE	WISE	CYB	4.0 km	MPC · JPL
446582	2014 OF_{245}	—	October 29, 2010	Mount Lemmon	Mount Lemmon Survey	·	3.0 km	MPC · JPL
446583	2014 OW_{308}	—	January 9, 2006	Mount Lemmon	Mount Lemmon Survey	EOS	2.0 km	MPC · JPL
446584	2014 OL_{335}	—	February 10, 2010	Kitt Peak	Spacewatch	T_{j} (2.96) · 3:2	5.8 km	MPC · JPL
446585	2014 PF_{2}	—	March 2, 2005	Kitt Peak	Spacewatch	·	1.3 km	MPC · JPL
446586	2014 PO_{11}	—	February 20, 2006	Mount Lemmon	Mount Lemmon Survey	·	3.3 km	MPC · JPL
446587	2014 QP_{38}	—	September 6, 2008	Kitt Peak	Spacewatch	ULA · CYB	3.5 km	MPC · JPL
446588	2014 QR_{301}	—	June 28, 2013	Mount Lemmon	Mount Lemmon Survey	·	3.2 km	MPC · JPL
446589	2014 RY_{34}	—	September 27, 1998	Kitt Peak	Spacewatch	EOS	2.7 km	MPC · JPL
446590	2014 SL_{125}	—	July 29, 2008	Mount Lemmon	Mount Lemmon Survey	·	3.4 km	MPC · JPL
446591	2014 SQ_{302}	—	May 11, 2007	Mount Lemmon	Mount Lemmon Survey	VER	3.7 km	MPC · JPL
446592	2015 KA_{23}	—	September 7, 2004	Socorro	LINEAR	T_{j} (2.98)	6.4 km	MPC · JPL
446593	2015 LK_{14}	—	April 5, 2010	Kitt Peak	Spacewatch	·	2.2 km	MPC · JPL
446594	2015 LS_{20}	—	November 19, 2007	Kitt Peak	Spacewatch	·	1.9 km	MPC · JPL
446595	2015 LO_{23}	—	May 22, 2010	WISE	WISE	·	3.3 km	MPC · JPL
446596	2015 LX_{39}	—	October 24, 1995	Kitt Peak	Spacewatch	·	2.4 km	MPC · JPL
446597	2015 ME_{4}	—	March 2, 2006	Kitt Peak	Spacewatch	·	1.6 km	MPC · JPL
446598	2015 MA_{7}	—	October 15, 2007	Mount Lemmon	Mount Lemmon Survey	·	1.8 km	MPC · JPL
446599	2015 MB_{8}	—	April 7, 2014	Mount Lemmon	Mount Lemmon Survey	EOS	1.4 km	MPC · JPL
446600	2015 MF_{8}	—	May 27, 2010	WISE	WISE	·	3.8 km	MPC · JPL

== 446601–446700 ==
back to top

Designation			Discovery			Properties		Ref
Permanent	Provisional	Named after	Date	Site	Discoverer(s)	Category	Diam.	Ref
446601	2015 MU_{8}	—	June 28, 2010	WISE	WISE	VER	2.6 km	MPC · JPL
446602	2015 MD_{9}	—	September 4, 2010	Mount Lemmon	Mount Lemmon Survey	·	4.7 km	MPC · JPL
446603	2015 MJ_{46}	—	August 23, 2008	Kitt Peak	Spacewatch	NYS	930 m	MPC · JPL
446604	2015 MQ_{46}	—	October 9, 2004	Socorro	LINEAR	·	1.2 km	MPC · JPL
446605	2015 MX_{46}	—	October 9, 2007	Kitt Peak	Spacewatch	·	1.5 km	MPC · JPL
446606	2015 MF_{47}	—	November 30, 2005	Mount Lemmon	Mount Lemmon Survey	·	2.9 km	MPC · JPL
446607	2015 MM_{52}	—	October 1, 2011	Mount Lemmon	Mount Lemmon Survey	·	2.0 km	MPC · JPL
446608	2015 MA_{59}	—	December 14, 2004	Campo Imperatore	CINEOS	·	1.7 km	MPC · JPL
446609	2015 MJ_{67}	—	October 27, 2005	Kitt Peak	Spacewatch	·	3.8 km	MPC · JPL
446610	2015 MJ_{69}	—	February 28, 2008	Kitt Peak	Spacewatch	·	760 m	MPC · JPL
446611	2015 MQ_{71}	—	June 13, 2004	Kitt Peak	Spacewatch	·	830 m	MPC · JPL
446612	2015 MK_{73}	—	January 9, 2007	Mount Lemmon	Mount Lemmon Survey	·	4.8 km	MPC · JPL
446613	2015 MJ_{76}	—	March 6, 2008	Mount Lemmon	Mount Lemmon Survey	EOS	2.2 km	MPC · JPL
446614	2015 MK_{76}	—	January 28, 2014	Mount Lemmon	Mount Lemmon Survey	·	1.2 km	MPC · JPL
446615	2015 MX_{76}	—	December 27, 2006	Mount Lemmon	Mount Lemmon Survey	·	2.4 km	MPC · JPL
446616	2015 MN_{77}	—	December 21, 2006	Mount Lemmon	Mount Lemmon Survey	·	5.2 km	MPC · JPL
446617	2015 MM_{78}	—	June 14, 2010	WISE	WISE	T_{j} (2.97)	3.4 km	MPC · JPL
446618	2015 MP_{82}	—	September 16, 1999	Kitt Peak	Spacewatch	·	1.3 km	MPC · JPL
446619	2015 MA_{83}	—	September 29, 2011	Mount Lemmon	Mount Lemmon Survey	·	2.0 km	MPC · JPL
446620	2015 MV_{83}	—	January 1, 2009	Kitt Peak	Spacewatch	·	1.9 km	MPC · JPL
446621	2015 MG_{84}	—	September 9, 2007	Kitt Peak	Spacewatch	·	1.4 km	MPC · JPL
446622	2015 MF_{85}	—	December 29, 2008	Kitt Peak	Spacewatch	·	910 m	MPC · JPL
446623	2015 MK_{85}	—	September 25, 2006	Kitt Peak	Spacewatch	KOR	1.2 km	MPC · JPL
446624	2015 MU_{91}	—	November 22, 2006	Mount Lemmon	Mount Lemmon Survey	·	3.5 km	MPC · JPL
446625	2015 MW_{91}	—	May 15, 2005	Mount Lemmon	Mount Lemmon Survey	AGN	1.4 km	MPC · JPL
446626	2015 MZ_{98}	—	August 29, 2006	Kitt Peak	Spacewatch	AGN	1.1 km	MPC · JPL
446627	2015 MZ_{102}	—	November 21, 2005	Catalina	CSS	·	900 m	MPC · JPL
446628	2015 ME_{103}	—	December 2, 2005	Socorro	LINEAR	·	4.5 km	MPC · JPL
446629	2015 ML_{103}	—	December 2, 2008	Mount Lemmon	Mount Lemmon Survey	·	1.8 km	MPC · JPL
446630	2015 MU_{107}	—	October 1, 2005	Kitt Peak	Spacewatch	THM	2.4 km	MPC · JPL
446631	2015 ML_{111}	—	December 4, 2007	Mount Lemmon	Mount Lemmon Survey	·	2.1 km	MPC · JPL
446632	2015 MN_{111}	—	October 25, 2005	Kitt Peak	Spacewatch	·	2.3 km	MPC · JPL
446633	2015 MZ_{114}	—	July 3, 2011	Mount Lemmon	Mount Lemmon Survey	EUN	960 m	MPC · JPL
446634	2015 MC_{116}	—	October 5, 2003	Kitt Peak	Spacewatch	·	1.2 km	MPC · JPL
446635	2015 MZ_{117}	—	August 29, 2005	Kitt Peak	Spacewatch	·	2.9 km	MPC · JPL
446636	2015 MA_{118}	—	December 19, 2003	Kitt Peak	Spacewatch	WIT	1.2 km	MPC · JPL
446637	2015 MG_{118}	—	June 26, 2010	WISE	WISE	·	2.8 km	MPC · JPL
446638	2015 ML_{120}	—	November 9, 2008	Kitt Peak	Spacewatch	·	1.4 km	MPC · JPL
446639	2015 MS_{120}	—	April 11, 2010	Mount Lemmon	Mount Lemmon Survey	EUN	1.1 km	MPC · JPL
446640	2015 ME_{121}	—	June 3, 2005	Siding Spring	SSS	·	1.9 km	MPC · JPL
446641	2015 MN_{121}	—	October 20, 2011	Kitt Peak	Spacewatch	·	1.7 km	MPC · JPL
446642	2015 MT_{123}	—	November 18, 2008	Kitt Peak	Spacewatch	·	1.7 km	MPC · JPL
446643	2015 MM_{124}	—	October 26, 2008	Mount Lemmon	Mount Lemmon Survey	·	1.2 km	MPC · JPL
446644	2015 MJ_{125}	—	November 25, 2005	Kitt Peak	Spacewatch	·	2.0 km	MPC · JPL
446645	2015 ML_{125}	—	October 19, 1995	Kitt Peak	Spacewatch	·	2.1 km	MPC · JPL
446646	2015 MQ_{125}	—	October 23, 2008	Mount Lemmon	Mount Lemmon Survey	·	1.5 km	MPC · JPL
446647	2015 ML_{126}	—	July 11, 2004	Socorro	LINEAR	·	3.5 km	MPC · JPL
446648	2015 MA_{129}	—	February 14, 2004	Kitt Peak	Spacewatch	·	2.4 km	MPC · JPL
446649	2015 MK_{129}	—	August 21, 2006	Kitt Peak	Spacewatch	·	2.2 km	MPC · JPL
446650	2015 MZ_{129}	—	September 4, 2007	Catalina	CSS	·	970 m	MPC · JPL
446651	2015 NM_{4}	—	October 20, 2006	Mount Lemmon	Mount Lemmon Survey	·	2.4 km	MPC · JPL
446652	2015 NA_{5}	—	May 2, 2003	Kitt Peak	Spacewatch	·	1.5 km	MPC · JPL
446653	2015 NY_{7}	—	December 27, 2006	Mount Lemmon	Mount Lemmon Survey	·	2.8 km	MPC · JPL
446654	2015 NE_{8}	—	February 1, 2009	Mount Lemmon	Mount Lemmon Survey	·	2.2 km	MPC · JPL
446655	2015 NJ_{8}	—	September 26, 2006	Catalina	CSS	DOR	2.1 km	MPC · JPL
446656	2015 NM_{8}	—	May 26, 2003	Kitt Peak	Spacewatch	·	3.8 km	MPC · JPL
446657	2015 NP_{8}	—	September 26, 2008	Kitt Peak	Spacewatch	·	890 m	MPC · JPL
446658	2015 NW_{8}	—	October 8, 2008	Mount Lemmon	Mount Lemmon Survey	·	1.2 km	MPC · JPL
446659	2015 NS_{9}	—	May 30, 2006	Mount Lemmon	Mount Lemmon Survey	·	1.7 km	MPC · JPL
446660	2015 NP_{12}	—	September 19, 2006	Kitt Peak	Spacewatch	·	2.0 km	MPC · JPL
446661	2015 NU_{15}	—	December 6, 2005	Kitt Peak	Spacewatch	V	650 m	MPC · JPL
446662	2015 NK_{16}	—	June 16, 2004	Siding Spring	SSS	PHO	1.2 km	MPC · JPL
446663	2015 NL_{16}	—	July 11, 2004	Socorro	LINEAR	·	880 m	MPC · JPL
446664	2015 NY_{16}	—	May 4, 2010	Kitt Peak	Spacewatch	·	1.9 km	MPC · JPL
446665	2015 NM_{17}	—	June 9, 2010	WISE	WISE	·	1.9 km	MPC · JPL
446666	2015 NC_{18}	—	October 4, 2004	Kitt Peak	Spacewatch	·	1.1 km	MPC · JPL
446667	2015 NE_{24}	—	September 17, 2010	Catalina	CSS	·	1.9 km	MPC · JPL
446668	2015 NB_{25}	—	September 23, 2000	Socorro	LINEAR	·	1.5 km	MPC · JPL
446669	2015 NP_{25}	—	December 17, 2009	Kitt Peak	Spacewatch	V	780 m	MPC · JPL
446670	2015 NQ_{25}	—	June 26, 2011	Mount Lemmon	Mount Lemmon Survey	PHO	1.3 km	MPC · JPL
446671	2015 NR_{25}	—	December 14, 2007	Mount Lemmon	Mount Lemmon Survey	·	2.6 km	MPC · JPL
446672	2015 OH_{1}	—	January 31, 2006	Mount Lemmon	Mount Lemmon Survey	NYS	1 km	MPC · JPL
446673	2015 OJ_{1}	—	October 21, 2012	Mount Lemmon	Mount Lemmon Survey	·	770 m	MPC · JPL
446674	2015 OC_{2}	—	November 25, 2009	Mount Lemmon	Mount Lemmon Survey	·	750 m	MPC · JPL
446675	2015 OF_{2}	—	February 9, 2008	Kitt Peak	Spacewatch	·	3.4 km	MPC · JPL
446676	2015 OS_{2}	—	July 7, 2010	WISE	WISE	THB	3.9 km	MPC · JPL
446677	2015 OK_{7}	—	March 27, 2003	Kitt Peak	Spacewatch	·	2.8 km	MPC · JPL
446678	2015 OT_{9}	—	June 12, 2010	WISE	WISE	·	3.9 km	MPC · JPL
446679	2015 OH_{11}	—	March 25, 2010	Mount Lemmon	Mount Lemmon Survey	·	2.1 km	MPC · JPL
446680	2015 OF_{13}	—	August 31, 2005	Kitt Peak	Spacewatch	·	3.2 km	MPC · JPL
446681	2015 OY_{13}	—	January 24, 2007	Kitt Peak	Spacewatch	·	790 m	MPC · JPL
446682	2015 OP_{14}	—	April 5, 2003	Kitt Peak	Spacewatch	THM	2.6 km	MPC · JPL
446683	2015 OB_{15}	—	March 8, 2005	Mount Lemmon	Mount Lemmon Survey	3:2	5.4 km	MPC · JPL
446684	2015 OJ_{15}	—	September 23, 2008	Kitt Peak	Spacewatch	·	1.1 km	MPC · JPL
446685	2015 OW_{15}	—	February 13, 2008	Kitt Peak	Spacewatch	·	1.8 km	MPC · JPL
446686	2015 OG_{16}	—	March 1, 2009	Mount Lemmon	Mount Lemmon Survey	·	2.0 km	MPC · JPL
446687	2015 OK_{16}	—	April 9, 2010	Mount Lemmon	Mount Lemmon Survey	·	980 m	MPC · JPL
446688	2015 OQ_{16}	—	December 31, 2008	Kitt Peak	Spacewatch	(7744)	1.3 km	MPC · JPL
446689	2015 OX_{16}	—	April 16, 2005	Kitt Peak	Spacewatch	·	1.8 km	MPC · JPL
446690	2015 OO_{18}	—	February 8, 2008	Kitt Peak	Spacewatch	EOS	1.6 km	MPC · JPL
446691	2015 OD_{19}	—	September 30, 2006	Catalina	CSS	·	2.4 km	MPC · JPL
446692	2015 OH_{19}	—	December 5, 2005	Kitt Peak	Spacewatch	·	4.8 km	MPC · JPL
446693	2015 OD_{24}	—	May 22, 2001	Kitt Peak	Spacewatch	·	1.7 km	MPC · JPL
446694	2015 OR_{24}	—	April 1, 2011	Mount Lemmon	Mount Lemmon Survey	·	710 m	MPC · JPL
446695	2015 OX_{24}	—	September 11, 2007	Catalina	CSS	·	3.6 km	MPC · JPL
446696	2015 OD_{25}	—	May 3, 2011	Mount Lemmon	Mount Lemmon Survey	·	1.2 km	MPC · JPL
446697	2015 OK_{25}	—	August 29, 2000	Socorro	LINEAR	NYS	1.5 km	MPC · JPL
446698	2015 OM_{25}	—	July 5, 2010	WISE	WISE	·	4.1 km	MPC · JPL
446699	2015 OK_{26}	—	November 10, 2005	Mount Lemmon	Mount Lemmon Survey	·	1.8 km	MPC · JPL
446700	2015 OX_{26}	—	November 6, 2008	Mount Lemmon	Mount Lemmon Survey	·	1.3 km	MPC · JPL

== 446701–446800 ==
back to top

Designation			Discovery			Properties		Ref
Permanent	Provisional	Named after	Date	Site	Discoverer(s)	Category	Diam.	Ref
446701	2015 OX_{27}	—	June 30, 2010	WISE	WISE	EUN	2.7 km	MPC · JPL
446702	2015 OE_{28}	—	March 2, 2006	Kitt Peak	Spacewatch	·	1.5 km	MPC · JPL
446703	2015 OT_{30}	—	October 11, 2010	Catalina	CSS	·	2.8 km	MPC · JPL
446704	2015 OM_{31}	—	October 26, 2005	Kitt Peak	Spacewatch	V	710 m	MPC · JPL
446705	2015 ON_{32}	—	November 24, 2008	Mount Lemmon	Mount Lemmon Survey	·	1.2 km	MPC · JPL
446706	2015 OO_{32}	—	February 16, 2004	Kitt Peak	Spacewatch	·	2.0 km	MPC · JPL
446707	2015 OV_{32}	—	November 5, 2007	Mount Lemmon	Mount Lemmon Survey	·	2.2 km	MPC · JPL
446708	2015 OD_{34}	—	March 26, 2009	Kitt Peak	Spacewatch	·	1.7 km	MPC · JPL
446709	2015 ON_{35}	—	July 16, 2004	Socorro	LINEAR	·	940 m	MPC · JPL
446710	2015 OG_{36}	—	October 1, 2008	Catalina	CSS	·	970 m	MPC · JPL
446711	2015 OH_{37}	—	August 20, 2004	Kitt Peak	Spacewatch	·	2.8 km	MPC · JPL
446712	2015 OH_{38}	—	April 8, 2010	Mount Lemmon	Mount Lemmon Survey	·	2.6 km	MPC · JPL
446713	2015 OH_{40}	—	August 19, 2006	Kitt Peak	Spacewatch	·	2.0 km	MPC · JPL
446714	2015 ON_{40}	—	September 10, 2004	Kitt Peak	Spacewatch	·	3.0 km	MPC · JPL
446715	2015 OP_{40}	—	September 7, 2004	Kitt Peak	Spacewatch	·	3.5 km	MPC · JPL
446716	2015 OK_{47}	—	December 10, 2004	Kitt Peak	Spacewatch	EUN	1.6 km	MPC · JPL
446717	2015 OM_{63}	—	November 15, 2007	Catalina	CSS	·	1.8 km	MPC · JPL
446718	2015 OP_{64}	—	June 22, 2006	Mount Lemmon	Mount Lemmon Survey	·	1.5 km	MPC · JPL
446719	2015 OQ_{65}	—	November 12, 2012	Mount Lemmon	Mount Lemmon Survey	(2076)	750 m	MPC · JPL
446720	2015 OT_{65}	—	September 6, 2007	Anderson Mesa	LONEOS	·	1.0 km	MPC · JPL
446721	2015 OB_{66}	—	December 27, 2006	Mount Lemmon	Mount Lemmon Survey	·	1.0 km	MPC · JPL
446722	2015 OM_{66}	—	January 16, 2007	Mount Lemmon	Mount Lemmon Survey	·	3.0 km	MPC · JPL
446723	2015 OU_{69}	—	August 15, 2004	Campo Imperatore	CINEOS	·	1.2 km	MPC · JPL
446724	2015 OW_{69}	—	January 25, 2009	Kitt Peak	Spacewatch	EUN	1.1 km	MPC · JPL
446725	2015 ON_{70}	—	December 19, 2007	Kitt Peak	Spacewatch	·	2.1 km	MPC · JPL
446726	2015 OD_{73}	—	February 10, 2008	Kitt Peak	Spacewatch	·	1.9 km	MPC · JPL
446727	2015 OH_{73}	—	April 8, 2008	Kitt Peak	Spacewatch	·	610 m	MPC · JPL
446728	2015 OK_{73}	—	September 12, 2007	Catalina	CSS	·	1.4 km	MPC · JPL
446729	2015 OW_{73}	—	August 29, 2006	Catalina	CSS	·	2.1 km	MPC · JPL
446730	2015 OY_{73}	—	July 3, 2011	Mount Lemmon	Mount Lemmon Survey	·	2.0 km	MPC · JPL
446731	2015 OF_{74}	—	June 19, 2010	WISE	WISE	·	3.1 km	MPC · JPL
446732	2015 OP_{74}	—	October 4, 1999	Kitt Peak	Spacewatch	·	1.9 km	MPC · JPL
446733	2015 OT_{74}	—	September 12, 2004	Socorro	LINEAR	·	4.2 km	MPC · JPL
446734	2015 ON_{75}	—	September 11, 2004	Socorro	LINEAR	·	4.9 km	MPC · JPL
446735	2015 OE_{76}	—	January 27, 2006	Mount Lemmon	Mount Lemmon Survey	·	1.9 km	MPC · JPL
446736	2015 OJ_{76}	—	February 17, 2010	Kitt Peak	Spacewatch	·	1.3 km	MPC · JPL
446737	2015 OR_{76}	—	June 27, 2011	Mount Lemmon	Mount Lemmon Survey	·	1.1 km	MPC · JPL
446738	2015 OL_{77}	—	September 7, 2004	Socorro	LINEAR	·	2.2 km	MPC · JPL
446739	2015 OV_{77}	—	October 22, 2011	Mount Lemmon	Mount Lemmon Survey	·	2.0 km	MPC · JPL
446740	2015 OH_{78}	—	September 27, 2000	Kitt Peak	Spacewatch	·	1.3 km	MPC · JPL
446741	2015 OP_{78}	—	January 31, 2006	Kitt Peak	Spacewatch	·	980 m	MPC · JPL
446742	2015 PH	—	October 23, 2006	Siding Spring	SSS	·	970 m	MPC · JPL
446743	2015 PS_{1}	—	June 23, 2010	WISE	WISE	·	2.3 km	MPC · JPL
446744	2015 PZ_{1}	—	April 24, 2010	WISE	WISE	·	3.2 km	MPC · JPL
446745	2015 PT_{2}	—	December 29, 2008	Kitt Peak	Spacewatch	NYS	1.4 km	MPC · JPL
446746	2015 PW_{2}	—	May 22, 2006	Mount Lemmon	Mount Lemmon Survey	·	3.2 km	MPC · JPL
446747	2015 PY_{2}	—	January 16, 2005	Kitt Peak	Spacewatch	·	1.2 km	MPC · JPL
446748	2015 PG_{3}	—	August 9, 2004	Anderson Mesa	LONEOS	·	3.0 km	MPC · JPL
446749	2015 PH_{3}	—	February 10, 2008	Kitt Peak	Spacewatch	BRA	2.1 km	MPC · JPL
446750	2015 PP_{3}	—	April 19, 2007	Kitt Peak	Spacewatch	·	1.4 km	MPC · JPL
446751	2015 PS_{3}	—	January 31, 2003	Kitt Peak	Spacewatch	·	4.5 km	MPC · JPL
446752	2015 PY_{3}	—	April 25, 2004	Kitt Peak	Spacewatch	(2076)	910 m	MPC · JPL
446753	2015 PF_{5}	—	July 8, 2010	WISE	WISE	·	4.8 km	MPC · JPL
446754	2015 PY_{8}	—	August 3, 2008	Siding Spring	SSS	·	1.9 km	MPC · JPL
446755	2015 PY_{11}	—	March 28, 2008	Kitt Peak	Spacewatch	·	560 m	MPC · JPL
446756	2015 PX_{12}	—	January 30, 2006	Kitt Peak	Spacewatch	·	1.7 km	MPC · JPL
446757	2015 PP_{29}	—	November 20, 2008	Kitt Peak	Spacewatch	·	1.7 km	MPC · JPL
446758	2015 PS_{30}	—	July 29, 2010	WISE	WISE	·	3.1 km	MPC · JPL
446759	2015 PR_{31}	—	September 8, 2004	Socorro	LINEAR	NYS	1.0 km	MPC · JPL
446760	2015 PW_{31}	—	December 4, 2008	Kitt Peak	Spacewatch	·	1.5 km	MPC · JPL
446761	2015 PJ_{33}	—	September 13, 1996	Kitt Peak	Spacewatch	·	1.3 km	MPC · JPL
446762	2015 PH_{34}	—	September 14, 2007	Kitt Peak	Spacewatch	·	1.2 km	MPC · JPL
446763	2015 PN_{34}	—	March 12, 2010	WISE	WISE	DOR	2.9 km	MPC · JPL
446764	2015 PO_{34}	—	July 2, 2011	Siding Spring	SSS	·	1.6 km	MPC · JPL
446765	2015 PA_{37}	—	September 10, 2010	Kitt Peak	Spacewatch	·	2.8 km	MPC · JPL
446766	2015 PC_{37}	—	January 16, 1996	Kitt Peak	Spacewatch	·	2.0 km	MPC · JPL
446767	2015 PN_{37}	—	October 12, 2007	Mount Lemmon	Mount Lemmon Survey	·	1.5 km	MPC · JPL
446768	2015 PO_{37}	—	November 8, 2007	Kitt Peak	Spacewatch	·	1.8 km	MPC · JPL
446769	2015 PV_{37}	—	November 5, 2007	Mount Lemmon	Mount Lemmon Survey	·	1.7 km	MPC · JPL
446770	2015 PD_{38}	—	January 16, 2009	Kitt Peak	Spacewatch	·	1.4 km	MPC · JPL
446771	2015 PH_{39}	—	July 29, 2000	Cerro Tololo	Deep Ecliptic Survey	MAS	630 m	MPC · JPL
446772	2015 PB_{41}	—	March 16, 2007	Kitt Peak	Spacewatch	·	1.1 km	MPC · JPL
446773	2015 PB_{53}	—	July 1, 2005	Kitt Peak	Spacewatch	·	2.7 km	MPC · JPL
446774	2015 PP_{54}	—	June 11, 2005	Kitt Peak	Spacewatch	·	1.7 km	MPC · JPL
446775	2015 PV_{54}	—	January 8, 2010	Mount Lemmon	Mount Lemmon Survey	·	1.2 km	MPC · JPL
446776	2015 PA_{60}	—	June 28, 2008	Siding Spring	SSS	·	720 m	MPC · JPL
446777	2015 PU_{149}	—	September 24, 2008	Kitt Peak	Spacewatch	NYS	1.1 km	MPC · JPL
446778	2015 PH_{200}	—	December 31, 2008	Kitt Peak	Spacewatch	NYS	1.1 km	MPC · JPL
446779	2015 PM_{202}	—	March 9, 2008	Kitt Peak	Spacewatch	·	3.0 km	MPC · JPL
446780	2015 PK_{230}	—	March 17, 2010	Siding Spring	SSS	EUN	1.5 km	MPC · JPL
446781	2015 PB_{286}	—	November 3, 2007	Catalina	CSS	·	1.3 km	MPC · JPL
446782	2015 PN_{293}	—	September 5, 2003	Campo Imperatore	CINEOS	·	1.2 km	MPC · JPL
446783	1993 TB_{10}	—	October 12, 1993	Kitt Peak	Spacewatch	·	970 m	MPC · JPL
446784	1995 SQ_{12}	—	September 18, 1995	Kitt Peak	Spacewatch	·	1.5 km	MPC · JPL
446785	1995 UU_{24}	—	October 19, 1995	Kitt Peak	Spacewatch	·	720 m	MPC · JPL
446786	1996 GD	—	April 7, 1996	Haleakala	AMOS	·	1.6 km	MPC · JPL
446787	1997 TP_{22}	—	October 5, 1997	Kitt Peak	Spacewatch	·	700 m	MPC · JPL
446788	1997 WM_{6}	—	November 23, 1997	Kitt Peak	Spacewatch	MAS	620 m	MPC · JPL
446789	1998 FN_{9}	—	March 24, 1998	Socorro	LINEAR	AMO	230 m	MPC · JPL
446790	1998 RJ_{26}	—	September 14, 1998	Socorro	LINEAR	·	1.8 km	MPC · JPL
446791	1998 SJ_{70}	—	September 26, 1998	Socorro	LINEAR	APO · PHA	720 m	MPC · JPL
446792	1998 TN_{21}	—	October 13, 1998	Kitt Peak	Spacewatch	·	1.3 km	MPC · JPL
446793	1998 UF_{2}	—	October 20, 1998	Caussols	ODAS	(5)	1.5 km	MPC · JPL
446794	1998 UF_{50}	—	October 19, 1998	Kitt Peak	Spacewatch	·	1.1 km	MPC · JPL
446795	1999 TD_{19}	—	September 7, 1999	Socorro	LINEAR	·	3.0 km	MPC · JPL
446796	1999 TC_{71}	—	October 9, 1999	Kitt Peak	Spacewatch	3:2	5.7 km	MPC · JPL
446797	1999 TE_{74}	—	September 4, 1999	Kitt Peak	Spacewatch	·	2.1 km	MPC · JPL
446798	1999 TE_{82}	—	October 12, 1999	Kitt Peak	Spacewatch	3:2 · SHU	4.2 km	MPC · JPL
446799	1999 TS_{92}	—	October 2, 1999	Socorro	LINEAR	·	830 m	MPC · JPL
446800	1999 TC_{192}	—	October 12, 1999	Socorro	LINEAR	H	630 m	MPC · JPL

== 446801–446900 ==
back to top

Designation			Discovery			Properties		Ref
Permanent	Provisional	Named after	Date	Site	Discoverer(s)	Category	Diam.	Ref
446801	1999 TT_{253}	—	October 10, 1999	Socorro	LINEAR	·	750 m	MPC · JPL
446802	1999 TB_{302}	—	October 9, 1999	Socorro	LINEAR	·	1.3 km	MPC · JPL
446803	1999 UD_{54}	—	October 19, 1999	Kitt Peak	Spacewatch	EOS	2.1 km	MPC · JPL
446804	1999 VN_{6}	—	November 4, 1999	Anderson Mesa	LONEOS	AMO	430 m	MPC · JPL
446805	1999 VY_{20}	—	October 9, 1999	Socorro	LINEAR	·	1.0 km	MPC · JPL
446806	1999 VK_{76}	—	November 5, 1999	Kitt Peak	Spacewatch	THM	1.8 km	MPC · JPL
446807	1999 VH_{113}	—	November 9, 1999	Socorro	LINEAR	·	1.5 km	MPC · JPL
446808	1999 VP_{129}	—	November 11, 1999	Kitt Peak	Spacewatch	·	2.1 km	MPC · JPL
446809	1999 VE_{131}	—	November 9, 1999	Kitt Peak	Spacewatch	·	800 m	MPC · JPL
446810	1999 VT_{135}	—	November 9, 1999	Socorro	LINEAR	H	610 m	MPC · JPL
446811	1999 WN_{22}	—	November 17, 1999	Kitt Peak	Spacewatch	·	1.5 km	MPC · JPL
446812	1999 XH_{35}	—	December 7, 1999	Socorro	LINEAR	·	4.2 km	MPC · JPL
446813	1999 XB_{239}	—	November 2, 1999	Kitt Peak	Spacewatch	·	2.8 km	MPC · JPL
446814	2000 AG_{209}	—	January 5, 2000	Kitt Peak	Spacewatch	·	3.4 km	MPC · JPL
446815	2000 BQ_{24}	—	January 29, 2000	Socorro	LINEAR	·	1.7 km	MPC · JPL
446816	2000 EE_{38}	—	March 8, 2000	Socorro	LINEAR	·	1.6 km	MPC · JPL
446817	2000 GO_{117}	—	April 2, 2000	Kitt Peak	Spacewatch	·	1.4 km	MPC · JPL
446818	2000 GP_{119}	—	April 5, 2000	Kitt Peak	Spacewatch	·	2.2 km	MPC · JPL
446819	2000 RB_{53}	—	September 6, 2000	Socorro	LINEAR	·	2.2 km	MPC · JPL
446820	2000 SK_{204}	—	September 24, 2000	Socorro	LINEAR	·	1.3 km	MPC · JPL
446821	2000 SO_{322}	—	September 28, 2000	Kitt Peak	Spacewatch	MAS	720 m	MPC · JPL
446822	2000 WV_{38}	—	November 20, 2000	Socorro	LINEAR	·	2.4 km	MPC · JPL
446823	2001 FB_{152}	—	March 26, 2001	Socorro	LINEAR	·	2.0 km	MPC · JPL
446824	2001 FB_{181}	—	March 21, 2001	Kitt Peak	Spacewatch	·	1.3 km	MPC · JPL
446825	2001 OM_{50}	—	July 21, 2001	Palomar	NEAT	·	720 m	MPC · JPL
446826	2001 PE_{1}	—	August 6, 2001	Haleakala	NEAT	AMO	660 m	MPC · JPL
446827	2001 QL_{162}	—	August 23, 2001	Anderson Mesa	LONEOS	CLO	1.7 km	MPC · JPL
446828	2001 QS_{171}	—	August 25, 2001	Socorro	LINEAR	·	820 m	MPC · JPL
446829	2001 QR_{210}	—	August 23, 2001	Anderson Mesa	LONEOS	·	2.0 km	MPC · JPL
446830	2001 QM_{226}	—	August 24, 2001	Anderson Mesa	LONEOS	·	910 m	MPC · JPL
446831	2001 QR_{239}	—	August 24, 2001	Socorro	LINEAR	·	3.4 km	MPC · JPL
446832	2001 QT_{306}	—	August 19, 2001	Cerro Tololo	M. W. Buie	·	1.6 km	MPC · JPL
446833	2001 RB_{12}	—	September 10, 2001	Socorro	LINEAR	APO	230 m	MPC · JPL
446834	2001 RV_{122}	—	September 12, 2001	Socorro	LINEAR	·	2.0 km	MPC · JPL
446835	2001 SD_{85}	—	September 20, 2001	Socorro	LINEAR	EUN	2.3 km	MPC · JPL
446836	2001 SW_{88}	—	September 20, 2001	Socorro	LINEAR	·	550 m	MPC · JPL
446837	2001 SW_{90}	—	September 20, 2001	Socorro	LINEAR	PHO	2.4 km	MPC · JPL
446838	2001 SZ_{119}	—	September 16, 2001	Socorro	LINEAR	·	1.3 km	MPC · JPL
446839	2001 SK_{120}	—	September 16, 2001	Socorro	LINEAR	·	1.6 km	MPC · JPL
446840	2001 SU_{126}	—	September 16, 2001	Socorro	LINEAR	·	1.8 km	MPC · JPL
446841	2001 SF_{157}	—	September 17, 2001	Socorro	LINEAR	·	710 m	MPC · JPL
446842	2001 SO_{198}	—	September 19, 2001	Socorro	LINEAR	·	1.7 km	MPC · JPL
446843	2001 SN_{208}	—	September 19, 2001	Socorro	LINEAR	·	2.1 km	MPC · JPL
446844	2001 SG_{226}	—	September 18, 2001	Kitt Peak	Spacewatch	·	1.1 km	MPC · JPL
446845	2001 SN_{264}	—	September 25, 2001	Socorro	LINEAR	PHO	1.0 km	MPC · JPL
446846	2001 SR_{312}	—	September 12, 2001	Socorro	LINEAR	·	1.5 km	MPC · JPL
446847	2001 SB_{333}	—	September 19, 2001	Palomar	NEAT	·	4.2 km	MPC · JPL
446848	2001 TN_{27}	—	October 14, 2001	Socorro	LINEAR	·	560 m	MPC · JPL
446849	2001 TF_{99}	—	October 14, 2001	Socorro	LINEAR	·	1.2 km	MPC · JPL
446850	2001 TT_{99}	—	October 14, 2001	Socorro	LINEAR	·	580 m	MPC · JPL
446851	2001 TK_{109}	—	October 14, 2001	Socorro	LINEAR	·	770 m	MPC · JPL
446852	2001 TN_{259}	—	October 11, 2001	Palomar	NEAT	·	1.7 km	MPC · JPL
446853	2001 UW_{45}	—	October 17, 2001	Socorro	LINEAR	·	760 m	MPC · JPL
446854	2001 UY_{67}	—	October 20, 2001	Socorro	LINEAR	·	850 m	MPC · JPL
446855	2001 UC_{72}	—	October 17, 2001	Haleakala	NEAT	·	770 m	MPC · JPL
446856	2001 UY_{96}	—	October 17, 2001	Socorro	LINEAR	·	770 m	MPC · JPL
446857	2001 UM_{98}	—	October 17, 2001	Socorro	LINEAR	·	2.4 km	MPC · JPL
446858	2001 UH_{129}	—	September 21, 2001	Socorro	LINEAR	·	2.2 km	MPC · JPL
446859	2001 UZ_{137}	—	October 23, 2001	Socorro	LINEAR	·	730 m	MPC · JPL
446860	2001 UU_{214}	—	October 23, 2001	Socorro	LINEAR	·	550 m	MPC · JPL
446861	2001 VL_{39}	—	November 9, 2001	Socorro	LINEAR	·	810 m	MPC · JPL
446862	2001 VB_{76}	—	November 12, 2001	Socorro	LINEAR	APO · PHA	280 m	MPC · JPL
446863	2001 VZ_{76}	—	November 15, 2001	Socorro	LINEAR	H	660 m	MPC · JPL
446864	2001 WK_{33}	—	November 17, 2001	Socorro	LINEAR	·	2.0 km	MPC · JPL
446865	2001 XM_{12}	—	December 9, 2001	Socorro	LINEAR	·	2.1 km	MPC · JPL
446866	2001 XC_{33}	—	December 10, 2001	Kitt Peak	Spacewatch	GEF	1.1 km	MPC · JPL
446867	2001 XA_{77}	—	December 11, 2001	Socorro	LINEAR	·	920 m	MPC · JPL
446868	2001 XP_{92}	—	December 10, 2001	Socorro	LINEAR	·	830 m	MPC · JPL
446869	2001 XJ_{102}	—	December 11, 2001	Socorro	LINEAR	·	960 m	MPC · JPL
446870	2001 XE_{123}	—	December 14, 2001	Socorro	LINEAR	·	920 m	MPC · JPL
446871	2001 YJ_{7}	—	December 17, 2001	Socorro	LINEAR	·	740 m	MPC · JPL
446872	2001 YU_{102}	—	December 17, 2001	Socorro	LINEAR	PHO	1.2 km	MPC · JPL
446873	2001 YO_{107}	—	December 17, 2001	Socorro	LINEAR	·	1.1 km	MPC · JPL
446874	2001 YF_{131}	—	December 18, 2001	Socorro	LINEAR	PHO	1.0 km	MPC · JPL
446875	2001 YG_{148}	—	December 18, 2001	Socorro	LINEAR	·	860 m	MPC · JPL
446876	2002 AB_{30}	—	December 11, 2001	Socorro	LINEAR	·	910 m	MPC · JPL
446877	2002 AX_{85}	—	January 9, 2002	Socorro	LINEAR	·	790 m	MPC · JPL
446878	2002 AH_{137}	—	December 17, 2001	Socorro	LINEAR	·	1.1 km	MPC · JPL
446879	2002 CJ_{4}	—	February 7, 2002	Kitt Peak	Spacewatch	·	1.9 km	MPC · JPL
446880	2002 CE_{195}	—	February 10, 2002	Socorro	LINEAR	NYS	880 m	MPC · JPL
446881	2002 CA_{316}	—	February 13, 2002	Kitt Peak	Spacewatch	EOS	2.1 km	MPC · JPL
446882	2002 DR_{13}	—	February 16, 2002	Palomar	NEAT	·	1.1 km	MPC · JPL
446883	2002 DY_{15}	—	February 16, 2002	Palomar	NEAT	·	3.0 km	MPC · JPL
446884	2002 EA_{8}	—	February 9, 2002	Kitt Peak	Spacewatch	·	4.0 km	MPC · JPL
446885	2002 GB_{66}	—	March 16, 2002	Kitt Peak	Spacewatch	EOS	2.5 km	MPC · JPL
446886	2002 GN_{74}	—	March 20, 2002	Kitt Peak	Spacewatch	NYS	1.3 km	MPC · JPL
446887	2002 GZ_{82}	—	April 10, 2002	Socorro	LINEAR	·	3.9 km	MPC · JPL
446888	2002 JA_{10}	—	May 6, 2002	Socorro	LINEAR	·	2.2 km	MPC · JPL
446889	2002 JW_{82}	—	May 11, 2002	Socorro	LINEAR	·	1.6 km	MPC · JPL
446890	2002 JU_{86}	—	April 18, 2002	Kitt Peak	Spacewatch	·	3.1 km	MPC · JPL
446891	2002 JU_{107}	—	May 10, 2002	Palomar	NEAT	·	3.1 km	MPC · JPL
446892	2002 JL_{134}	—	February 13, 2002	Kitt Peak	Spacewatch	·	3.2 km	MPC · JPL
446893	2002 NO	—	July 4, 2002	Kitt Peak	Spacewatch	MAR	880 m	MPC · JPL
446894	2002 NZ_{74}	—	July 5, 2002	Palomar	NEAT	·	1.2 km	MPC · JPL
446895	2002 PQ_{63}	—	August 10, 2002	Socorro	LINEAR	·	2.3 km	MPC · JPL
446896	2002 PZ_{75}	—	August 8, 2002	Palomar	NEAT	·	1.1 km	MPC · JPL
446897	2002 PW_{171}	—	August 8, 2002	Palomar	NEAT	·	1.1 km	MPC · JPL
446898	2002 PR_{183}	—	August 15, 2002	Palomar	NEAT	·	1.4 km	MPC · JPL
446899	2002 PD_{192}	—	August 15, 2002	Palomar	NEAT	·	1.5 km	MPC · JPL
446900	2002 QP_{32}	—	August 29, 2002	Palomar	NEAT	·	1.2 km	MPC · JPL

== 446901–447000 ==
back to top

Designation			Discovery			Properties		Ref
Permanent	Provisional	Named after	Date	Site	Discoverer(s)	Category	Diam.	Ref
446901	2002 QE_{61}	—	August 17, 2002	Palomar	NEAT	·	1.5 km	MPC · JPL
446902	2002 QA_{115}	—	August 16, 2002	Palomar	NEAT	·	960 m	MPC · JPL
446903	2002 QL_{119}	—	August 28, 2002	Palomar	NEAT	·	570 m	MPC · JPL
446904	2002 QB_{133}	—	January 28, 2000	Kitt Peak	Spacewatch	EUN	1.0 km	MPC · JPL
446905	2002 QS_{139}	—	August 16, 2002	Palomar	NEAT	·	1.4 km	MPC · JPL
446906	2002 RR_{5}	—	September 3, 2002	Palomar	NEAT	·	3.0 km	MPC · JPL
446907	2002 RE_{21}	—	September 5, 2002	Socorro	LINEAR	·	1.2 km	MPC · JPL
446908	2002 RU_{26}	—	September 4, 2002	Palomar	NEAT	·	1.6 km	MPC · JPL
446909	2002 RQ_{80}	—	September 5, 2002	Socorro	LINEAR	CYB	3.7 km	MPC · JPL
446910	2002 RL_{159}	—	September 11, 2002	Haleakala	NEAT	·	1.3 km	MPC · JPL
446911	2002 RY_{189}	—	September 5, 2002	Socorro	LINEAR	·	1.4 km	MPC · JPL
446912	2002 RW_{203}	—	September 14, 2002	Palomar	NEAT	·	1.4 km	MPC · JPL
446913	2002 RW_{233}	—	September 14, 2002	Palomar	R. Matson	H	530 m	MPC · JPL
446914	2002 RR_{244}	—	September 15, 2002	Palomar	NEAT	·	1.4 km	MPC · JPL
446915	2002 RR_{271}	—	September 4, 2002	Palomar	NEAT	EUN	1.2 km	MPC · JPL
446916	2002 SF_{70}	—	September 26, 2002	Palomar	NEAT	JUN	1.8 km	MPC · JPL
446917	2002 TN_{15}	—	October 2, 2002	Socorro	LINEAR	·	800 m	MPC · JPL
446918	2002 TT_{114}	—	October 3, 2002	Palomar	NEAT	EUN	1.4 km	MPC · JPL
446919	2002 TB_{196}	—	October 3, 2002	Socorro	LINEAR	·	1.5 km	MPC · JPL
446920	2002 TY_{296}	—	October 11, 2002	Socorro	LINEAR	EUN	1.5 km	MPC · JPL
446921	2002 TN_{310}	—	October 4, 2002	Apache Point	SDSS	·	640 m	MPC · JPL
446922	2002 UM_{72}	—	October 16, 2002	Palomar	NEAT	·	1.4 km	MPC · JPL
446923	2002 VL_{2}	—	November 3, 2002	Palomar	NEAT	H	800 m	MPC · JPL
446924	2002 VV_{17}	—	November 7, 2002	Socorro	LINEAR	ATE	330 m	MPC · JPL
446925	2002 VH_{27}	—	November 5, 2002	Socorro	LINEAR	·	1.3 km	MPC · JPL
446926	2002 VD_{98}	—	November 6, 2002	Anderson Mesa	LONEOS	·	2.4 km	MPC · JPL
446927	2002 VH_{102}	—	November 5, 2002	Socorro	LINEAR	·	1.8 km	MPC · JPL
446928	2002 VP_{107}	—	November 12, 2002	Socorro	LINEAR	·	1.7 km	MPC · JPL
446929	2002 VA_{108}	—	November 12, 2002	Socorro	LINEAR	·	2.5 km	MPC · JPL
446930	2002 VZ_{144}	—	November 4, 2002	Palomar	NEAT	·	2.2 km	MPC · JPL
446931	2002 VD_{145}	—	November 4, 2002	Palomar	NEAT	·	1.6 km	MPC · JPL
446932	2002 WN_{13}	—	November 27, 2002	Anderson Mesa	LONEOS	·	1.4 km	MPC · JPL
446933	2002 XA_{25}	—	December 5, 2002	Socorro	LINEAR	·	2.1 km	MPC · JPL
446934	2002 XZ_{35}	—	December 5, 2002	Socorro	LINEAR	·	770 m	MPC · JPL
446935	2002 XZ_{38}	—	December 10, 2002	Socorro	LINEAR	AMO +1km	800 m	MPC · JPL
446936	2002 XJ_{61}	—	December 10, 2002	Socorro	LINEAR	H	730 m	MPC · JPL
446937	2002 XN_{119}	—	December 10, 2002	Palomar	NEAT	·	2.3 km	MPC · JPL
446938	2002 YQ_{5}	—	December 31, 2002	Socorro	LINEAR	AMO	330 m	MPC · JPL
446939	2002 YE_{13}	—	December 9, 2002	Kitt Peak	Spacewatch	·	1.5 km	MPC · JPL
446940	2003 BH_{34}	—	January 26, 2003	Palomar	NEAT	·	700 m	MPC · JPL
446941	2003 BQ_{65}	—	January 30, 2003	Anderson Mesa	LONEOS	·	1.8 km	MPC · JPL
446942	2003 FZ_{10}	—	March 23, 2003	Kitt Peak	Spacewatch	·	880 m	MPC · JPL
446943	2003 FS_{11}	—	March 23, 2003	Kitt Peak	Spacewatch	·	750 m	MPC · JPL
446944	2003 FF_{32}	—	March 23, 2003	Catalina	CSS	·	810 m	MPC · JPL
446945	2003 FH_{39}	—	March 24, 2003	Kitt Peak	Spacewatch	NYS	770 m	MPC · JPL
446946	2003 GM_{47}	—	April 7, 2003	Kitt Peak	Spacewatch	·	1.4 km	MPC · JPL
446947	2003 HH_{50}	—	April 30, 2003	Kitt Peak	Spacewatch	·	3.0 km	MPC · JPL
446948	2003 JS_{5}	—	May 1, 2003	Kitt Peak	Spacewatch	·	2.7 km	MPC · JPL
446949	2003 LL_{7}	—	June 1, 2003	Cerro Tololo	M. W. Buie	·	1.1 km	MPC · JPL
446950	2003 MO_{7}	—	June 26, 2003	Haleakala	NEAT	·	2.6 km	MPC · JPL
446951	2003 RF_{6}	—	September 1, 2003	Socorro	LINEAR	·	4.2 km	MPC · JPL
446952	2003 RE_{24}	—	September 15, 2003	Palomar	NEAT	·	3.5 km	MPC · JPL
446953	2003 SR_{3}	—	September 16, 2003	Kitt Peak	Spacewatch	·	990 m	MPC · JPL
446954	2003 SM_{4}	—	September 16, 2003	Socorro	LINEAR	T_{j} (2.92)	4.1 km	MPC · JPL
446955	2003 SC_{11}	—	September 17, 2003	Kitt Peak	Spacewatch	AMO	320 m	MPC · JPL
446956	2003 SY_{31}	—	September 18, 2003	Kitt Peak	Spacewatch	·	1.0 km	MPC · JPL
446957 Priellekornélia	2003 SD_{127}	Priellekornélia	September 19, 2003	Piszkéstető	K. Sárneczky, B. Sipőcz	·	940 m	MPC · JPL
446958	2003 SQ_{132}	—	September 19, 2003	Kitt Peak	Spacewatch	·	820 m	MPC · JPL
446959	2003 SW_{243}	—	September 28, 2003	Kitt Peak	Spacewatch	·	3.5 km	MPC · JPL
446960	2003 SJ_{270}	—	September 24, 2003	Haleakala	NEAT	·	1.0 km	MPC · JPL
446961	2003 ST_{365}	—	September 26, 2003	Apache Point	SDSS	·	2.3 km	MPC · JPL
446962	2003 SV_{408}	—	September 28, 2003	Apache Point	SDSS	·	2.7 km	MPC · JPL
446963	2003 TK	—	October 1, 2003	Kitt Peak	Spacewatch	AMO	450 m	MPC · JPL
446964	2003 TS_{47}	—	September 18, 2003	Kitt Peak	Spacewatch	·	3.5 km	MPC · JPL
446965	2003 UV_{41}	—	October 17, 2003	Kitt Peak	Spacewatch	·	820 m	MPC · JPL
446966	2003 UX_{59}	—	October 17, 2003	Anderson Mesa	LONEOS	·	1.2 km	MPC · JPL
446967	2003 UO_{112}	—	October 20, 2003	Socorro	LINEAR	(5)	1.0 km	MPC · JPL
446968	2003 UP_{190}	—	October 23, 2003	Junk Bond	Junk Bond	·	2.8 km	MPC · JPL
446969	2003 UO_{303}	—	October 17, 2003	Kitt Peak	Spacewatch	·	1.8 km	MPC · JPL
446970	2003 UL_{304}	—	October 18, 2003	Kitt Peak	Spacewatch	·	670 m	MPC · JPL
446971	2003 UQ_{308}	—	October 19, 2003	Kitt Peak	Spacewatch	·	680 m	MPC · JPL
446972	2003 UT_{322}	—	October 16, 2003	Kitt Peak	Spacewatch	·	820 m	MPC · JPL
446973	2003 UV_{337}	—	October 18, 2003	Kitt Peak	Spacewatch	·	690 m	MPC · JPL
446974	2003 UF_{338}	—	October 18, 2003	Apache Point	SDSS	·	630 m	MPC · JPL
446975	2003 UJ_{349}	—	October 19, 2003	Apache Point	SDSS	·	900 m	MPC · JPL
446976	2003 UX_{355}	—	October 19, 2003	Kitt Peak	Spacewatch	·	640 m	MPC · JPL
446977	2003 UE_{403}	—	October 23, 2003	Apache Point	SDSS	·	910 m	MPC · JPL
446978	2003 WF_{22}	—	November 19, 2003	Kitt Peak	Spacewatch	·	1.1 km	MPC · JPL
446979	2003 WH_{25}	—	November 18, 2003	Kitt Peak	Spacewatch	·	1.2 km	MPC · JPL
446980	2003 WB_{30}	—	November 18, 2003	Kitt Peak	Spacewatch	·	1.1 km	MPC · JPL
446981	2003 WD_{35}	—	November 19, 2003	Kitt Peak	Spacewatch	·	1.5 km	MPC · JPL
446982	2003 WJ_{46}	—	November 18, 2003	Catalina	CSS	·	1.1 km	MPC · JPL
446983	2003 WW_{85}	—	November 20, 2003	Kitt Peak	Spacewatch	·	870 m	MPC · JPL
446984	2003 WP_{110}	—	November 20, 2003	Socorro	LINEAR	·	1.4 km	MPC · JPL
446985	2003 WZ_{163}	—	November 30, 2003	Kitt Peak	Spacewatch	·	1.4 km	MPC · JPL
446986	2003 WS_{192}	—	November 24, 2003	Socorro	LINEAR	·	1.9 km	MPC · JPL
446987	2003 XY	—	December 3, 2003	Socorro	LINEAR	·	1.8 km	MPC · JPL
446988	2003 YJ_{11}	—	December 17, 2003	Socorro	LINEAR	·	1.8 km	MPC · JPL
446989	2003 YG_{14}	—	December 17, 2003	Socorro	LINEAR	·	1.2 km	MPC · JPL
446990	2003 YM_{22}	—	December 18, 2003	Socorro	LINEAR	·	960 m	MPC · JPL
446991	2003 YL_{24}	—	December 17, 2003	Kitt Peak	Spacewatch	·	1.8 km	MPC · JPL
446992	2003 YD_{33}	—	December 16, 2003	Catalina	CSS	·	1.1 km	MPC · JPL
446993	2003 YE_{39}	—	December 19, 2003	Kitt Peak	Spacewatch	·	2.3 km	MPC · JPL
446994	2003 YD_{42}	—	December 19, 2003	Kitt Peak	Spacewatch	·	1.1 km	MPC · JPL
446995	2003 YM_{116}	—	December 27, 2003	Socorro	LINEAR	·	1.9 km	MPC · JPL
446996	2003 YL_{181}	—	December 29, 2003	Kitt Peak	Spacewatch	EUN	1.1 km	MPC · JPL
446997	2004 BV_{3}	—	January 16, 2004	Palomar	NEAT	·	1.2 km	MPC · JPL
446998	2004 BJ_{103}	—	January 31, 2004	Socorro	LINEAR	·	2.1 km	MPC · JPL
446999	2004 BA_{129}	—	January 16, 2004	Kitt Peak	Spacewatch	·	520 m	MPC · JPL
447000	2004 BR_{131}	—	January 16, 2004	Kitt Peak	Spacewatch	·	740 m	MPC · JPL

back to top

== Meaning of names ==
As minor planet discoveries are confirmed, they are given a permanent number by the IAU's Minor Planet Center (MPC), and the discoverers can then submit names for them, following the IAU's naming conventions. The list below concerns those minor planets in the specified number-range that have received names, and explains the meanings of those names.

Official naming citations of newly named small Solar System bodies are approved and published in a bulletin by IAU's Working Group for Small Bodies Nomenclature (WGSBN). Before May 2021, citations were published in MPC's Minor Planet Circulars for many decades. Recent citations can also be found on the JPL Small-Body Database (SBDB). Until his death in 2016, German astronomer Lutz D. Schmadel compiled these citations into the Dictionary of Minor Planet Names (DMP) and regularly updated the collection.

Based on Paul Herget's The Names of the Minor Planets, Schmadel also researched the unclear origin of numerous asteroids, most of which had been named prior to World War II. This article incorporates text from this source, which is in the public domain: SBDB New namings may only be added to this list below after official publication as the preannouncement of names is condemned. The WGSBN publishes a comprehensive guideline for the naming rules of non-cometary small Solar System bodies.

Named minor planet	Provisional	This minor planet was named for...	Ref · Catalog
446500 Katrinraynor	2014 KR_{59}	Katrin Raynor-Evans (born 1981) is a British philatelist specializing in the history and collection of astronomy-themed stamps. She is an amateur astronomer and writer for popular astronomy magazines, and a Fellow of The Royal Astronomical Society.	JPL · 446500
446957 Priellekornélia	2003 SD_{127}	Kornélia Prielle (1826–1906) was a Hungarian stage actress who was engaged at the National Theatre from 1861 until her death.	IAU · 446957
