= Campo Imperatore Near-Earth Object Survey =

Observatory in Italy

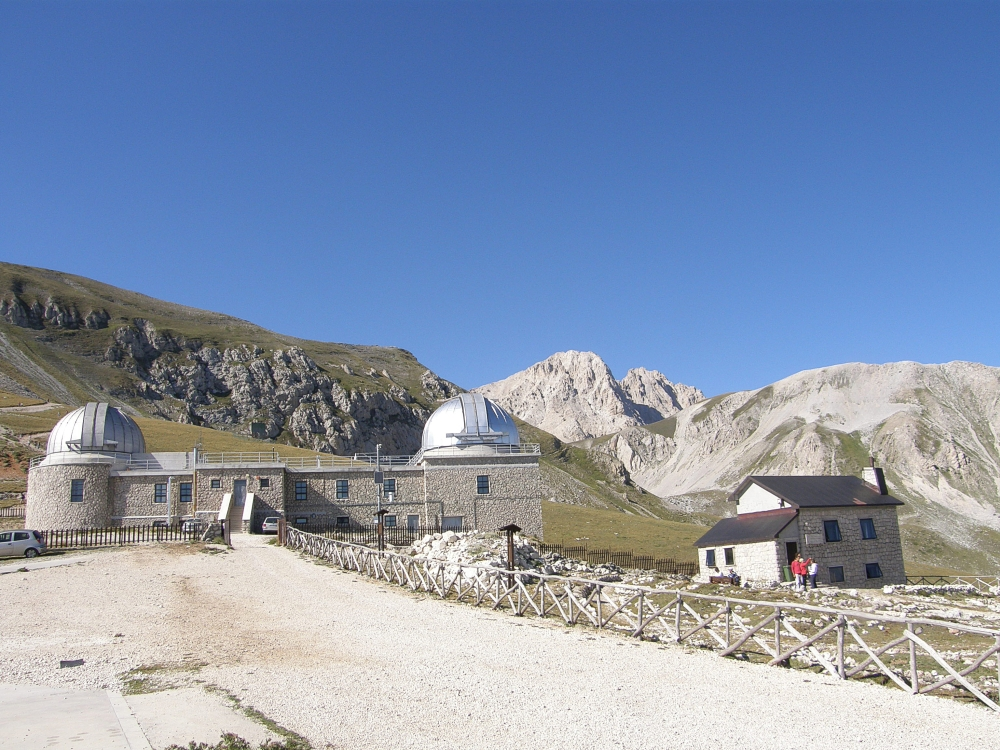
- Observatory of Campo Imperatore, Gran Sasso
- Alternative names: CINEOS
- Coordinates: 42°26′39″N 13°33′29″E

Minor planets discovered: 1591
see § List of discovered minor planets

The CINEOS program (Campo Imperatore Near-Earth Object Survey), started in 2001, is dedicated to the discovery and follow-up of near-Earth objects (NEOs), namely asteroids and comets which periodically approach or intersect the Earth's orbit. In particular CINEOS is addressed to the discovery of Atens and Interior-Earth Objects (IEOs) by extending survey coverage at small solar elongations, and to the discovery of the other kind of NEOs by observing with longer exposures (up to a limiting magnitude of 21) in the opposition region.

Between August 2001 and November 2004, CINEOS measured more than 61000 asteroid positions and discovered more than 1500 new objects, including several NEOs and one cometary centaur, 167P/CINEOS. In June–September 2003, CINEOS was ranked fifth in the world for the number of discoveries (sixth place in the period June–August 2004) and has been the first Italian professional program to discover a NEO and an asteroid beyond the orbit of Jupiter.

The survey is carried out at the Campo Imperatore station of the Rome Observatory near the summit of the Gran Sasso Mountain, at about 2,150 meters of elevation. The station is located about 130 km north-east of Rome. The Observatory of Turin has been also involved in this project. Operated at the Schmidt telescope (60-90–183 cm) available at the station, the program uses between 10 and 14 nights per month, usually around the first and last quarter of the moon.

== Objectives ==
The science of CINEOS consists of two main observing activities:

=== NEO discovery ===
To search for near-Earth objects (NEOs), concentrating activities at small solar elongations. The objective is to optimize a ground-based system towards the discoveries of:

- Aten asteroids
- Interior-Earth Objects (IEOs)

Although the NEO discovery rate grew significantly from 2001 to 2005, knowledge of bodies with small semimajor axis remains largely incomplete (Atens) or totally incomplete (Inner-Earth Objects). Most search programs concentrate their efforts near the opposition region where it is difficult if not impossible to find these objects.

Aten asteroids are also very important because numerical simulations have shown that they have the highest frequency of close encounters with the Earth. Sometimes Atens can evolve into orbits completely inside that of the Earth and vice versa. Thus, there are bodies that can come very close to the Earth, but are very difficult to observe from the ground.

=== Astrometry ===
The second goal of CINEOS is to provide rapid astrometric data for:

- Follow-up of NEOs in urgent need of observations.
- Recovery of NEOs at future apparitions.
- Follow-up of small bodies belonging to other unusual orbital classes.

The survey activity is carried out mostly at the beginning and near the end of the night, while part of the middle of night time is usually available for the follow-up work. As a targeted follow-up system, CINEOS takes advantage of the combination of the relatively faint limiting magnitude and large field of view (probably the largest in the world for this activity). Follow-up can be provided up to magnitude 21, occasionally to 22 on the best nights.

Coordination of the follow-up work will be accomplished within the Spaceguard Central Node facilities. An essential side of the work is to choose targets that cannot be done elsewhere very easily during the epoch of the observing run.

== List of discovered minor planets ==
39335 Caccin	10 January 2002	list
39336 Mariacapria	11 January 2002	list
52030 Maxvasile	6 August 2002	list
64975 Gianrix	10 January 2002	list
65357 Antoniucci	12 July 2002	list
73442 Feruglio	10 July 2002	list
73465 Buonanno	10 July 2002	list
(73529) 2003 OF_{1}	22 July 2003	list
(73534) 2003 OD_{7}	24 July 2003	list
(73539) 2003 OW_{18}	30 July 2003	list
73551 Dariocastellano	18 August 2003	list
78124 Cicalò	11 July 2002	list
78125 Salimbeni	11 July 2002	list
78249 Capaccioni	4 August 2002	list
78252 Priscio	5 August 2002	list
78310 Spoto	5 August 2002	list
78534 Renmir	6 September 2002	list
78535 Carloconti	6 September 2002	list
78652 Quero	3 October 2002	list
78661 Castelfranco	2 October 2002	list
(78819) 2003 QQ_{6}	20 August 2003	list
(78830) 2003 QV_{24}	22 August 2003	list
(78844) 2003 QO_{51}	22 August 2003	list
(78857) 2003 QO_{70}	22 August 2003	list
(78943) 2003 SL_{171}	18 September 2003	list

(78948) 2003 SM_{192}	20 September 2003	list
84012 Deluise	2 August 2002	list
84015 Efthymiopoulos	5 August 2002	list
84100 Farnocchia	3 September 2002	list
(84118) 2002 RE_{26}	3 September 2002	list
(84119) 2002 RF_{26}	3 September 2002	list
(84120) 2002 RY_{27}	4 September 2002	list
(84339) 2002 TR_{57}	2 October 2002	list
(90278) 2003 DH_{9}	24 February 2003	list
(95020) 2002 AV_{12}	10 January 2002	list
(95760) 2003 EF_{41}	9 March 2003	list
(95783) 2003 FJ_{6}	27 March 2003	list
(95895) 2003 HF_{12}	25 April 2003	list
(95951) 2003 QG_{6}	18 August 2003	list
(95955) 2003 QX_{32}	21 August 2003	list
(96028) 2004 PD_{30}	8 August 2004	list
(96033) 2004 PE_{36}	9 August 2004	list
(110702) 2001 TR_{216}	13 October 2001	list
(111571) 2002 AD_{13}	11 January 2002	list
(112320) 2002 MB_{1}	19 June 2002	list
(112337) 2002 NR_{4}	10 July 2002	list
(112338) 2002 NX_{5}	10 July 2002	list
(112339) 2002 NF_{6}	11 July 2002	list
(112340) 2002 NN_{6}	11 July 2002	list
(112492) 2002 PA_{6}	2 August 2002	list

(112527) 2002 PJ_{33}	5 August 2002	list
(112947) 2002 RQ_{8}	3 September 2002	list
(113208) 2002 RR_{114}	5 September 2002	list
(113213) 2002 RM_{118}	6 September 2002	list
113219 Thomasmazzi	7 September 2002	list
(113237) 2002 RH_{126}	8 September 2002	list
(113620) 2002 TR_{61}	3 October 2002	list
(113621) 2002 TA_{62}	3 October 2002	list
(113622) 2002 TE_{62}	3 October 2002	list
(113623) 2002 TO_{63}	3 October 2002	list
(113626) 2002 TZ_{65}	4 October 2002	list
(113659) 2002 TQ_{85}	2 October 2002	list
(113660) 2002 TX_{85}	2 October 2002	list
(113661) 2002 TE_{86}	2 October 2002	list
(113673) 2002 TU_{97}	2 October 2002	list
(113683) 2002 TB_{111}	2 October 2002	list
(113684) 2002 TG_{111}	2 October 2002	list
(114608) 2003 DC_{7}	23 February 2003	list
(114611) 2003 DE_{9}	24 February 2003	list
(114612) 2003 DV_{12}	26 February 2003	list
(114613) 2003 DS_{15}	25 February 2003	list
(114735) 2003 HP_{9}	24 April 2003	list
(114738) 2003 HQ_{12}	23 April 2003	list
(114739) 2003 HR_{12}	23 April 2003	list
(114740) 2003 HB_{14}	25 April 2003	list

(114813) 2003 OB_{7}	24 July 2003	list
(114815) 2003 OO_{9}	24 July 2003	list
(114824) 2003 OB_{17}	29 July 2003	list
(114825) 2003 OD_{17}	29 July 2003	list
114828 Ricoromita	30 July 2003	list
114829 Chierchia	23 July 2003	list
(114862) 2003 QF_{1}	19 August 2003	list
(114863) 2003 QH_{1}	19 August 2003	list
(114864) 2003 QM_{1}	19 August 2003	list
(114865) 2003 QP_{2}	19 August 2003	list
(114866) 2003 QU_{2}	19 August 2003	list
(114869) 2003 QX_{5}	18 August 2003	list
(114870) 2003 QF_{7}	20 August 2003	list
(114874) 2003 QY_{10}	20 August 2003	list
(114886) 2003 QN_{16}	20 August 2003	list
(114900) 2003 QU_{24}	22 August 2003	list
115051 Safaeinili	4 September 2003	list
(115142) 2003 SM_{64}	18 September 2003	list
(115143) 2003 SO_{64}	18 September 2003	list
(115144) 2003 SQ_{64}	18 September 2003	list
(115145) 2003 SD_{65}	18 September 2003	list
(115146) 2003 SK_{66}	18 September 2003	list
(115147) 2003 SU_{66}	19 September 2003	list
(115148) 2003 SZ_{66}	19 September 2003	list
(115183) 2003 SO_{94}	19 September 2003	list

(115218) 2003 SF_{140}	19 September 2003	list
(115233) 2003 SH_{145}	20 September 2003	list
(117071) 2004 KO_{13}	19 May 2004	list
(117081) 2004 LB_{11}	10 June 2004	list
(117123) 2004 PZ_{35}	8 August 2004	list
(117310) 2004 VA_{23}	5 November 2004	list
(117311) 2004 VD_{23}	5 November 2004	list
(117324) 2004 WW_{4}	18 November 2004	list
(117328) 2004 WH_{9}	21 November 2004	list
(117345) 2004 XO_{41}	11 December 2004	list
(117374) 2004 XQ_{147}	13 December 2004	list
(117815) 2005 HM_{5}	30 April 2005	list
(119961) 2002 TQ_{57}	2 October 2002	list
120097 Janniksinner	10 March 2003	list
120098 Telmopievani	10 March 2003	list
(120101) 2003 FP_{5}	26 March 2003	list
(120102) 2003 FU_{5}	26 March 2003	list
(126177) 2002 AP_{12}	10 January 2002	list
(126246) 2002 AB_{67}	9 January 2002	list
(126247) 2002 AL_{67}	9 January 2002	list
(126248) 2002 AO_{67}	9 January 2002	list
(126249) 2002 AP_{67}	9 January 2002	list
(127415) 2002 NG_{6}	11 July 2002	list
(127658) 2003 DV_{10}	26 February 2003	list
(127660) 2003 DT_{12}	26 February 2003	list

(127664) 2003 DV_{14}	25 February 2003	list
(127737) 2003 FZ_{5}	26 March 2003	list
(127936) 2003 HU_{1}	23 April 2003	list
(127955) 2003 HY_{13}	25 April 2003	list
(127958) 2003 HD_{16}	25 April 2003	list
(127965) 2003 HG_{22}	24 April 2003	list
(128067) 2003 OK_{4}	22 July 2003	list
(128069) 2003 OF_{7}	24 July 2003	list
(128078) 2003 OE_{17}	29 July 2003	list
(128079) 2003 OL_{17}	29 July 2003	list
(128086) 2003 OQ_{31}	30 July 2003	list
(128103) 2003 QW_{1}	19 August 2003	list
(128104) 2003 QG_{4}	18 August 2003	list
(128105) 2003 QK_{6}	18 August 2003	list
(128220) 2003 SN_{88}	18 September 2003	list
(128430) 2004 NC_{1}	7 July 2004	list
(128471) 2004 OG_{13}	16 July 2004	list
(128484) 2004 PZ_{9}	6 August 2004	list
(128485) 2004 PD_{10}	6 August 2004	list
(128496) 2004 PV_{16}	7 August 2004	list
(128497) 2004 PA_{17}	7 August 2004	list
(128498) 2004 PB_{17}	8 August 2004	list
(128499) 2004 PH_{17}	8 August 2004	list
(128500) 2004 PJ_{17}	8 August 2004	list
(128506) 2004 PF_{30}	8 August 2004	list

(128532) 2004 PG_{56}	9 August 2004	list
(128551) 2004 PW_{75}	9 August 2004	list
(129110) 2004 XM_{40}	10 December 2004	list
(131764) 2002 AZ_{11}	10 January 2002	list
(131765) 2002 AF_{12}	10 January 2002	list
(131766) 2002 AT_{12}	10 January 2002	list
(131767) 2002 AZ_{12}	11 January 2002	list
(132668) 2002 NA_{6}	10 July 2002	list
(132669) 2002 NJ_{6}	11 July 2002	list
(132741) 2002 PU_{33}	6 August 2002	list
(133103) 2003 OG_{7}	24 July 2003	list
(133112) 2003 OV_{21}	29 July 2003	list
(133121) 2003 OC_{32}	29 July 2003	list
(133136) 2003 QS_{2}	19 August 2003	list
(133138) 2003 QF_{6}	18 August 2003	list
(133142) 2003 QH_{9}	20 August 2003	list
(133146) 2003 QB_{17}	21 August 2003	list
(133154) 2003 QL_{23}	20 August 2003	list
(133158) 2003 QE_{27}	23 August 2003	list
(133279) 2003 SF_{17}	18 September 2003	list
133296 Federicotosi	19 September 2003	list
(133321) 2003 SE_{88}	18 September 2003	list
(133322) 2003 SF_{88}	18 September 2003	list
(133323) 2003 SL_{88}	18 September 2003	list
(133364) 2003 SS_{136}	19 September 2003	list

(133365) 2003 SA_{140}	18 September 2003	list
(133405) 2003 SK_{171}	18 September 2003	list
(133424) 2003 SH_{192}	20 September 2003	list
(134056) 2004 XB_{37}	11 December 2004	list
(134060) 2004 XR_{43}	11 December 2004	list
(134106) 2004 XP_{147}	13 December 2004	list
(134136) 2005 AR_{29}	8 January 2005	list
(134137) 2005 AV_{29}	8 January 2005	list
(135662) 2002 MA_{1}	19 June 2002	list
(135695) 2002 PK	1 August 2002	list
(135889) 2002 TN_{61}	3 October 2002	list
(135890) 2002 TF_{63}	3 October 2002	list
(135892) 2002 TY_{65}	4 October 2002	list
(135910) 2002 TZ_{110}	2 October 2002	list
(136100) 2003 DW_{12}	26 February 2003	list
(141772) 2002 NM_{5}	10 July 2002	list
(141871) 2002 PZ_{33}	6 August 2002	list
(141872) 2002 PB_{34}	6 August 2002	list
(142558) 2002 TP_{61}	3 October 2002	list
(142576) 2002 TZ_{85}	2 October 2002	list
(142577) 2002 TC_{86}	2 October 2002	list
(142595) 2002 TF_{111}	2 October 2002	list
(143496) 2003 DU_{10}	26 February 2003	list
(143498) 2003 DJ_{12}	25 February 2003	list
(143499) 2003 DQ_{12}	26 February 2003	list

(143626) 2003 HU_{27}	25 April 2003	list
(143670) 2003 SJ_{145}	20 September 2003	list
(144559) 2004 FK_{10}	16 March 2004	list
(144574) 2004 FS_{22}	16 March 2004	list
(145159) 2005 HM_{4}	27 April 2005	list
(145306) 2005 KC_{11}	28 May 2005	list
(145440) 2005 QU_{143}	26 August 2005	list
(146985) 2002 PM_{11}	5 August 2002	list
(147059) 2002 RD_{118}	8 September 2002	list
(147113) 2002 TK_{70}	2 October 2002	list
(147429) 2003 HQ_{9}	25 April 2003	list
(147566) 2004 FB_{37}	16 March 2004	list
(147686) 2004 PJ_{66}	10 August 2004	list
(147761) 2005 QJ_{10}	25 August 2005	list
(149195) 2002 PH	1 August 2002	list
(149233) 2002 RP_{118}	7 September 2002	list
(149270) 2002 TG_{70}	2 October 2002	list
(149455) 2003 DX_{11}	25 February 2003	list
(149456) 2003 DA_{13}	26 February 2003	list
(149559) 2003 OG_{1}	22 July 2003	list
(149640) 2004 FX_{9}	16 March 2004	list
(149724) 2004 JK_{32}	14 May 2004	list
(149735) 2004 LC_{11}	10 June 2004	list
(149852) 2005 QB_{10}	25 August 2005	list
(151280) 2002 AM_{188}	10 January 2002	list

(151698) 2003 AH_{84}	14 January 2003	list
(151776) 2003 EZ_{41}	9 March 2003	list
(151807) 2003 FG_{75}	27 March 2003	list
(152040) 2004 PA_{10}	6 August 2004	list
(152203) 2005 QD_{153}	27 August 2005	list
(154464) 2003 DU_{12}	26 February 2003	list
(154521) 2003 FW_{83}	27 March 2003	list
(154596) 2003 OP_{9}	24 July 2003	list
(154722) 2004 NA	6 July 2004	list
(154723) 2004 NS	7 July 2004	list
(154724) 2004 NU	7 July 2004	list
(154754) 2004 PO_{9}	6 August 2004	list
(154755) 2004 PT_{9}	6 August 2004	list
(154756) 2004 PW_{9}	6 August 2004	list
(154757) 2004 PX_{9}	6 August 2004	list
(154758) 2004 PL_{10}	6 August 2004	list
(154793) 2004 PO_{68}	6 August 2004	list
(154810) 2004 PZ_{106}	15 August 2004	list
(154982) 2004 VA_{28}	5 November 2004	list
(154987) 2004 WJ_{4}	17 November 2004	list
(155016) 2005 QS_{19}	25 August 2005	list
(155042) 2005 RQ_{5}	2 September 2005	list
(156862) 2003 DF_{9}	24 February 2003	list
(156864) 2003 DX_{12}	26 February 2003	list
(156910) 2003 FB_{6}	26 March 2003	list

(156954) 2003 HP_{12}	23 April 2003	list
(157006) 2003 QH_{3}	19 August 2003	list
(157007) 2003 QZ_{6}	20 August 2003	list
(157010) 2003 QY_{32}	21 August 2003	list
(157091) 2004 FZ_{36}	16 March 2004	list
(157110) 2004 LG_{11}	10 June 2004	list
(157118) 2004 NT	7 July 2004	list
(157168) 2004 PY_{43}	6 August 2004	list
(157186) 2004 PU_{96}	11 August 2004	list
(157189) 2004 PX_{106}	15 August 2004	list
(158408) 2002 AO_{12}	10 January 2002	list
(158592) 2002 NG_{5}	10 July 2002	list
(158651) 2003 DP_{12}	26 February 2003	list
(158652) 2003 DW_{14}	25 February 2003	list
(158653) 2003 DP_{15}	26 February 2003	list
(158670) 2003 EL_{50}	10 March 2003	list
(158673) 2003 FO_{5}	26 March 2003	list
(158674) 2003 FH_{6}	27 March 2003	list
(158714) 2003 HO_{12}	23 April 2003	list
(158775) 2003 SR_{64}	18 September 2003	list
(158863) 2004 PV_{9}	6 August 2004	list
(158876) 2004 PE_{30}	8 August 2004	list
(158898) 2004 PX_{100}	10 August 2004	list
(159117) 2004 VX_{23}	5 November 2004	list
(159131) 2004 WF_{2}	17 November 2004	list

(159132) 2004 WU_{3}	17 November 2004	list
(159141) 2004 XM_{30}	10 December 2004	list
(159142) 2004 XQ_{33}	11 December 2004	list
(159145) 2004 XZ_{60}	14 December 2004	list
(159158) 2004 XN_{177}	11 December 2004	list
(159788) 2003 OF_{23}	30 July 2003	list
(159909) 2004 VF_{23}	5 November 2004	list
(160328) 2003 OG_{4}	21 July 2003	list
(160339) 2003 SY_{66}	19 September 2003	list
(160344) 2003 SG_{145}	20 September 2003	list
(161080) 2002 MC_{1}	19 June 2002	list
(161173) 2002 TW_{62}	3 October 2002	list
(161192) 2002 TN_{196}	4 October 2002	list
(161258) 2003 FM_{5}	26 March 2003	list
(161316) 2003 QH_{6}	18 August 2003	list
(161320) 2003 QE_{33}	22 August 2003	list
(161344) 2003 SU_{64}	18 September 2003	list
(161345) 2003 SX_{64}	18 September 2003	list
(161347) 2003 SP_{94}	19 September 2003	list
(161496) 2004 NY	7 July 2004	list
(163072) 2002 AD_{12}	10 January 2002	list
(163073) 2002 AX_{12}	10 January 2002	list
(163349) 2002 NZ_{4}	10 July 2002	list
(163366) 2002 PM	1 August 2002	list
(163367) 2002 PP	2 August 2002	list

(163726) 2003 HX_{54}	24 April 2003	list
(163749) 2003 NR_{7}	9 July 2003	list
(163754) 2003 OD_{6}	21 July 2003	list
(163773) 2003 QZ_{1}	19 August 2003	list
(163776) 2003 QL_{9}	20 August 2003	list
(163778) 2003 QX_{16}	21 August 2003	list
(163846) 2003 SW_{63}	17 September 2003	list
(163847) 2003 SF_{64}	18 September 2003	list
(163869) 2003 SK_{136}	19 September 2003	list
(163875) 2003 SE_{162}	19 September 2003	list
(163935) 2003 SG_{321}	20 September 2003	list
(164277) 2004 XK_{30}	10 December 2004	list
(164315) 2005 AW_{29}	8 January 2005	list
(166387) 2002 NU_{4}	10 July 2002	list
(166388) 2002 NC_{5}	10 July 2002	list
(166437) 2002 PE_{33}	5 August 2002	list
(166438) 2002 PD_{34}	6 August 2002	list
(166571) 2002 RF_{120}	3 September 2002	list
(166667) 2002 TU_{57}	2 October 2002	list
(166669) 2002 TQ_{61}	3 October 2002	list
(166675) 2002 TD_{86}	2 October 2002	list
(166677) 2002 TH_{99}	3 October 2002	list
(166966) 2003 OT_{1}	21 July 2003	list
(166969) 2003 OR_{3}	22 July 2003	list
(166970) 2003 OV_{3}	22 July 2003	list

(166971) 2003 OD_{4}	21 July 2003	list
(166972) 2003 OJ_{4}	22 July 2003	list
(166982) 2003 OT_{21}	28 July 2003	list
(167010) 2003 QZ_{4}	20 August 2003	list
(167011) 2003 QP_{6}	20 August 2003	list
(167012) 2003 QF_{9}	20 August 2003	list
(167126) 2003 SS_{141}	20 September 2003	list
(167686) 2004 JX_{23}	14 May 2004	list
(168015) 2005 HK_{5}	30 April 2005	list
(168016) 2005 HZ_{7}	30 April 2005	list
(169718) 2002 MJ	17 June 2002	list
(169843) 2002 RT_{8}	4 September 2002	list
(169876) 2002 RC_{120}	3 September 2002	list
(169948) 2002 TZ_{62}	3 October 2002	list
(170154) 2003 DT_{6}	23 February 2003	list
(170189) 2003 OF_{4}	21 July 2003	list
(170200) 2003 OP_{19}	30 July 2003	list
(170201) 2003 OR_{19}	30 July 2003	list
(170212) 2003 QS	18 August 2003	list
(170216) 2003 QN_{6}	19 August 2003	list
(170225) 2003 QY_{16}	21 August 2003	list
(170338) 2003 SK_{122}	18 September 2003	list
(170357) 2003 SZ_{190}	18 September 2003	list
(172068) 2002 AE_{13}	11 January 2002	list
(172153) 2002 NK_{6}	11 July 2002	list

(172171) 2002 PT	2 August 2002	list
(172416) 2003 FV_{5}	26 March 2003	list
(172423) 2003 OK_{16}	26 July 2003	list
(172429) 2003 QN_{1}	19 August 2003	list
(172430) 2003 QL_{8}	20 August 2003	list
(172431) 2003 QO_{16}	20 August 2003	list
(172500) 2003 SH_{171}	18 September 2003	list
(172539) 2003 UP_{37}	17 October 2003	list
(172971) 2005 QN_{176}	31 August 2005	list
(174236) 2002 RO_{117}	8 September 2002	list
(174306) 2002 TU_{61}	3 October 2002	list
(174307) 2002 TY_{61}	3 October 2002	list
(174308) 2002 TS_{63}	4 October 2002	list
(174309) 2002 TX_{65}	4 October 2002	list
(174315) 2002 TA_{86}	2 October 2002	list
(174326) 2002 TD_{122}	3 October 2002	list
(174551) 2003 FH_{75}	27 March 2003	list
(174619) 2003 SH_{64}	18 September 2003	list
(174621) 2003 SX_{66}	19 September 2003	list
(174635) 2003 SZ_{124}	19 September 2003	list
(174641) 2003 SU_{141}	20 September 2003	list
(174654) 2003 SL_{192}	20 September 2003	list
(175106) 2004 KJ_{11}	19 May 2004	list
(176640) 2002 NP_{6}	11 July 2002	list
(176669) 2002 PV_{33}	6 August 2002	list

(176670) 2002 PW_{33}	6 August 2002	list
(176726) 2002 RG_{26}	3 September 2002	list
(176751) 2002 RS_{114}	5 September 2002	list
(177040) 2003 DQ_{6}	23 February 2003	list
(177042) 2003 DV_{11}	25 February 2003	list
(177126) 2003 HE_{12}	25 April 2003	list
(177138) 2003 QE_{6}	18 August 2003	list
(177211) 2003 UZ_{140}	17 October 2003	list
(177645) 2004 PQ_{89}	9 August 2004	list
(177864) 2005 QG_{19}	25 August 2005	list
(179415) 2002 AC_{12}	10 January 2002	list
(179620) 2002 PN_{33}	6 August 2002	list
(179804) 2002 TK_{62}	3 October 2002	list
(179805) 2002 TS_{62}	3 October 2002	list
(179816) 2002 TF_{86}	2 October 2002	list
(180082) 2003 DZ_{11}	25 February 2003	list
(180099) 2003 EY_{62}	10 March 2003	list
(180560) 2004 EB_{54}	15 March 2004	list
(180577) 2004 FA_{10}	16 March 2004	list
(180746) 2004 LA_{11}	10 June 2004	list
(180767) 2004 PC_{36}	8 August 2004	list
(181071) 2005 QH_{19}	25 August 2005	list
(181072) 2005 QJ_{19}	25 August 2005	list
(181073) 2005 QQ_{19}	25 August 2005	list
(181084) 2005 QN_{38}	25 August 2005	list

(181112) 2005 QL_{91}	25 August 2005	list
(182788) 2002 AX_{11}	10 January 2002	list
(182824) 2002 AQ_{191}	12 January 2002	list
(182994) 2002 PO_{11}	5 August 2002	list
(182998) 2002 PW_{34}	5 August 2002	list
(183105) 2002 RH_{118}	4 September 2002	list
(183231) 2002 TJ_{70}	2 October 2002	list
(183264) 2002 TH_{220}	5 October 2002	list
(183482) 2003 DE_{12}	25 February 2003	list
(183483) 2003 DS_{12}	26 February 2003	list
(183484) 2003 DZ_{14}	25 February 2003	list
(183570) 2003 QJ_{3}	19 August 2003	list
(184115) 2004 HJ_{49}	23 April 2004	list
(184192) 2004 PC_{30}	8 August 2004	list
(184196) 2004 PF_{36}	9 August 2004	list
(184204) 2004 PS_{75}	8 August 2004	list
(184207) 2004 PQ_{88}	7 August 2004	list
(184272) 2004 XR_{114}	10 December 2004	list
(184345) 2005 HO_{4}	27 April 2005	list
(184526) 2005 QL_{19}	25 August 2005	list
(184567) 2005 QF_{79}	26 August 2005	list
(184572) 2005 QE_{91}	25 August 2005	list
(186801) 2004 EF_{54}	15 March 2004	list
(186814) 2004 FB_{10}	16 March 2004	list
(186825) 2004 FD_{37}	16 March 2004	list

(187119) 2005 QD_{79}	26 August 2005	list
(187126) 2005 QN_{91}	25 August 2005	list
(187423) 2005 VR_{114}	10 November 2005	list
(188113) 2002 AM_{67}	9 January 2002	list
(188332) 2003 QD_{3}	19 August 2003	list
(188340) 2003 SL_{32}	18 September 2003	list
(188409) 2004 EX_{73}	15 March 2004	list
(188466) 2004 KG_{11}	19 May 2004	list
(188468) 2004 LM_{8}	12 June 2004	list
(188485) 2004 PM_{10}	6 August 2004	list
(188489) 2004 PH_{30}	8 August 2004	list
(188495) 2004 PM_{66}	10 August 2004	list
(189196) 2003 QH_{28}	21 August 2003	list
(189222) 2004 FC_{10}	16 March 2004	list
(189812) 2002 NQ_{4}	9 July 2002	list
(189867) 2003 QV_{2}	19 August 2003	list
(189917) 2003 SV_{141}	20 September 2003	list
(190018) 2004 PU_{16}	7 August 2004	list
(190126) 2004 XY_{190}	11 December 2004	list
(191235) 2002 TB_{122}	3 October 2002	list
(191317) 2003 HK_{55}	25 April 2003	list
(191329) 2003 OB_{18}	24 July 2003	list
(191333) 2003 QR_{1}	19 August 2003	list
(191334) 2003 QB_{2}	19 August 2003	list
(191335) 2003 QC_{5}	20 August 2003	list

(191371) 2003 RS_{9}	4 September 2003	list
(191381) 2003 SD_{17}	18 September 2003	list
(191409) 2003 SJ_{88}	18 September 2003	list
(191417) 2003 SU_{137}	21 September 2003	list
(191440) 2003 SO_{182}	20 September 2003	list
(191443) 2003 SG_{192}	20 September 2003	list
(191623) 2004 NB_{1}	7 July 2004	list
(191649) 2004 PX_{46}	8 August 2004	list
(191689) 2004 RZ_{136}	8 September 2004	list
(191858) 2004 WV_{4}	18 November 2004	list
(194843) 2002 AW_{12}	10 January 2002	list
(194844) 2002 AB_{13}	11 January 2002	list
(195634) 2002 NP_{4}	9 July 2002	list
(195635) 2002 NB_{6}	11 July 2002	list
(195649) 2002 NB_{44}	11 July 2002	list
(195692) 2002 PJ_{11}	5 August 2002	list
(195936) 2002 RO_{123}	9 September 2002	list
(196069) 2002 TY_{62}	3 October 2002	list
(196082) 2002 TB_{86}	2 October 2002	list
(196245) 2003 DB_{9}	24 February 2003	list
(196246) 2003 DL_{9}	24 February 2003	list
(196247) 2003 DP_{9}	25 February 2003	list
(196301) 2003 FG_{6}	27 March 2003	list
(196416) 2003 HP_{1}	23 April 2003	list
(196518) 2003 OS_{3}	22 July 2003	list

(196528) 2003 OE_{18}	24 July 2003	list
(196530) 2003 OB_{20}	30 July 2003	list
(196531) 2003 OC_{20}	30 July 2003	list
(196534) 2003 OR_{21}	28 July 2003	list
(196547) 2003 QE_{2}	20 August 2003	list
(196548) 2003 QN_{2}	19 August 2003	list
(196551) 2003 QW_{6}	20 August 2003	list
(196552) 2003 QD_{7}	20 August 2003	list
(196554) 2003 QZ_{7}	18 August 2003	list
(196583) 2003 QM_{48}	20 August 2003	list
(196584) 2003 QX_{48}	21 August 2003	list
(196682) 2003 SK_{64}	18 September 2003	list
(196683) 2003 SY_{64}	18 September 2003	list
(196684) 2003 SZ_{64}	18 September 2003	list
(196685) 2003 SB_{65}	18 September 2003	list
(196686) 2003 SC_{65}	18 September 2003	list
(196688) 2003 SQ_{66}	18 September 2003	list
(196733) 2003 SA_{122}	17 September 2003	list
(196738) 2003 SC_{133}	20 September 2003	list
(196742) 2003 SO_{137}	21 September 2003	list
(196773) 2003 SJ_{171}	18 September 2003	list
(197594) 2004 HD_{49}	22 April 2004	list
(197642) 2004 LF_{11}	10 June 2004	list
(197654) 2004 NX	7 July 2004	list
(197655) 2004 NZ	7 July 2004	list

(197725) 2004 PC_{17}	8 August 2004	list
(197778) 2004 PJ_{46}	7 August 2004	list
(197779) 2004 PO_{46}	7 August 2004	list
(197780) 2004 PW_{46}	8 August 2004	list
(197808) 2004 PN_{70}	8 August 2004	list
(197831) 2004 PV_{94}	10 August 2004	list
(197843) 2004 PK_{109}	12 August 2004	list
(197967) 2004 RV_{106}	8 September 2004	list
(198400) 2004 VA_{53}	5 November 2004	list
(198401) 2004 VB_{53}	5 November 2004	list
(198437) 2004 WV_{3}	17 November 2004	list
(198475) 2004 XK_{37}	11 December 2004	list
(198516) 2004 XC_{89}	10 December 2004	list
(198555) 2004 XU_{144}	13 December 2004	list
(198560) 2004 XA_{149}	14 December 2004	list
(200887) 2002 AY_{11}	10 January 2002	list
(200888) 2002 AJ_{12}	10 January 2002	list
(200889) 2002 AS_{12}	10 January 2002	list
(201182) 2002 PR_{33}	6 August 2002	list
(201211) 2002 PJ_{185}	3 August 2002	list
(201233) 2002 RR_{8}	3 September 2002	list
(201253) 2002 RV_{119}	7 September 2002	list
(201306) 2002 TL_{62}	3 October 2002	list
(201309) 2002 TH_{70}	2 October 2002	list
(201314) 2002 TQ_{97}	2 October 2002	list

(201515) 2003 OS_{21}	28 July 2003	list
(201519) 2003 OV_{31}	24 July 2003	list
(201521) 2003 QX_{1}	19 August 2003	list
(201522) 2003 QC_{2}	19 August 2003	list
(201523) 2003 QX_{8}	20 August 2003	list
(201529) 2003 QS_{24}	22 August 2003	list
(201584) 2003 SX_{87}	17 September 2003	list
(201610) 2003 SA_{202}	20 September 2003	list
(201955) 2004 LD_{13}	11 June 2004	list
(201957) 2004 ME_{7}	24 June 2004	list
(201968) 2004 PG_{17}	8 August 2004	list
(202189) 2004 XQ_{43}	11 December 2004	list
(203680) 2002 NU_{5}	10 July 2002	list
(203703) 2002 PS_{33}	6 August 2002	list
(203704) 2002 PX_{34}	5 August 2002	list
(203791) 2002 TD_{62}	3 October 2002	list
(203806) 2002 TA_{122}	3 October 2002	list
(203889) 2003 EH_{50}	10 March 2003	list
(203898) 2003 HH_{12}	25 April 2003	list
(203900) 2003 HE_{22}	24 April 2003	list
(203915) 2003 OA_{4}	22 July 2003	list
(203917) 2003 OK_{6}	22 July 2003	list
(203922) 2003 OH_{17}	29 July 2003	list
(203926) 2003 OX_{30}	30 July 2003	list
(203956) 2003 SX_{63}	17 September 2003	list

(203965) 2003 SB_{140}	18 September 2003	list
(204092) 2003 WZ_{69}	19 November 2003	list
(204197) 2004 BE_{121}	31 January 2004	list
(204416) 2004 VC_{53}	5 November 2004	list
(204419) 2004 VU_{61}	5 November 2004	list
(204425) 2004 WM_{3}	17 November 2004	list
(204432) 2004 XN_{41}	11 December 2004	list
(204433) 2004 XV_{44}	11 December 2004	list
(204468) 2005 AE_{25}	8 January 2005	list
(204590) 2005 GB_{90}	6 April 2005	list
(205700) 2002 AY_{12}	10 January 2002	list
(205701) 2002 AC_{13}	11 January 2002	list
(205972) 2002 NY_{4}	10 July 2002	list
(205973) 2002 NO_{6}	11 July 2002	list
(206001) 2002 PK_{33}	5 August 2002	list
(206142) 2002 TA_{66}	4 October 2002	list
(206326) 2003 OT_{3}	22 July 2003	list
(206327) 2003 OY_{3}	22 July 2003	list
(206347) 2003 QL_{1}	19 August 2003	list
(206348) 2003 QA_{12}	21 August 2003	list
(206377) 2003 QK_{114}	23 August 2003	list
(206419) 2003 SS_{137}	21 September 2003	list
(206420) 2003 SG_{140}	19 September 2003	list
(206421) 2003 ST_{141}	20 September 2003	list
(206912) 2004 PK_{17}	8 August 2004	list

(206931) 2004 RO_{42}	8 September 2004	list
(207033) 2004 WW_{1}	17 November 2004	list
(207034) 2004 WM_{2}	17 November 2004	list
(207049) 2004 XJ_{44}	13 December 2004	list
(207050) 2004 XV_{50}	14 December 2004	list
(207051) 2004 XY_{50}	14 December 2004	list
(207110) 2005 AX_{29}	8 January 2005	list
(208742) 2002 NA_{44}	11 July 2002	list
(208883) 2002 TK_{86}	2 October 2002	list
(209037) 2003 OZ_{3}	22 July 2003	list
(209043) 2003 OM_{20}	30 July 2003	list
(209046) 2003 QP	18 August 2003	list
(209047) 2003 QV_{1}	19 August 2003	list
(209048) 2003 QY_{5}	19 August 2003	list
(209051) 2003 QE_{11}	20 August 2003	list
(209125) 2003 SK_{192}	20 September 2003	list
(209507) 2004 PP_{10}	7 August 2004	list
(209556) 2004 WG_{4}	17 November 2004	list
(209578) 2004 XE_{84}	11 December 2004	list
(209579) 2004 XL_{89}	10 December 2004	list
(210942) 2001 TT_{209}	12 October 2001	list
(211213) 2002 PO_{33}	6 August 2002	list
(211217) 2002 PY_{63}	2 August 2002	list
(211470) 2003 DA_{15}	25 February 2003	list
(211501) 2003 QX_{2}	19 August 2003	list

(211509) 2003 QD_{33}	22 August 2003	list
(211561) 2003 SQ_{94}	19 September 2003	list
(211823) 2004 EM_{22}	15 March 2004	list
(211909) 2004 PN_{9}	6 August 2004	list
(211910) 2004 PG_{105}	6 August 2004	list
(211939) 2004 XV_{36}	11 December 2004	list
(211940) 2004 XU_{50}	14 December 2004	list
(211978) 2005 AU_{29}	8 January 2005	list
(213571) 2002 NR_{5}	10 July 2002	list
(213593) 2002 PN_{11}	5 August 2002	list
(213676) 2002 TC_{66}	4 October 2002	list
(213786) 2003 FJ_{5}	26 March 2003	list
(213854) 2003 SK_{88}	18 September 2003	list
(213869) 2003 SG_{170}	20 September 2003	list
(214104) 2004 PR_{75}	8 August 2004	list
(214296) 2005 HN_{5}	30 April 2005	list
(214361) 2005 KF_{9}	27 May 2005	list
(215453) 2002 PG_{11}	5 August 2002	list
(215492) 2002 TE_{122}	3 October 2002	list
(215593) 2003 QG_{9}	20 August 2003	list
(215752) 2004 FZ_{2}	16 March 2004	list
(215823) 2005 AX_{18}	8 January 2005	list
(215962) 2005 PA	1 August 2005	list
(217119) 2002 AK_{12}	10 January 2002	list
(217193) 2002 TS_{61}	3 October 2002	list

(217196) 2002 TY_{110}	2 October 2002	list
(217247) 2003 QF	18 August 2003	list
217257 Valemangano	19 November 2003	list
(217321) 2004 PR_{88}	7 August 2004	list
(217402) 2005 HP_{5}	30 April 2005	list
(218121) 2002 PB_{112}	3 August 2002	list
(218153) 2002 RS_{123}	9 September 2002	list
(218187) 2002 TD_{63}	3 October 2002	list
(218195) 2002 TD_{99}	3 October 2002	list
(218197) 2002 TH_{111}	2 October 2002	list
(218290) 2003 OJ_{6}	22 July 2003	list
(218591) 2005 LL_{42}	13 June 2005	list
(218625) 2005 QE_{153}	27 August 2005	list
(219987) 2002 NE_{44}	11 July 2002	list
(220316) 2003 EL_{60}	11 March 2003	list
(220353) 2003 HH_{55}	25 April 2003	list
(220378) 2003 QQ	18 August 2003	list
(220379) 2003 QF_{4}	18 August 2003	list
(220387) 2003 QN_{48}	20 August 2003	list
(220572) 2004 HZ_{54}	21 April 2004	list
(220610) 2004 PY_{16}	7 August 2004	list
(220867) 2004 WF_{10}	18 November 2004	list
(220869) 2004 WR_{11}	17 November 2004	list
(220932) 2005 HN_{4}	27 April 2005	list
(221023) 2005 QK_{19}	25 August 2005	list

(221024) 2005 QP_{19}	25 August 2005	list
(222944) 2002 PL_{11}	5 August 2002	list
(223042) 2002 TN_{56}	2 October 2002	list
(223306) 2003 OV_{6}	22 July 2003	list
(223310) 2003 OK_{17}	29 July 2003	list
(223315) 2003 QX_{4}	20 August 2003	list
(223316) 2003 QF_{5}	21 August 2003	list
(223323) 2003 QG_{44}	22 August 2003	list
(223364) 2003 SG_{17}	18 September 2003	list
(223389) 2003 SG_{88}	18 September 2003	list
(223655) 2004 PX_{16}	7 August 2004	list
(223673) 2004 PJ_{70}	7 August 2004	list
(223893) 2004 VB_{23}	5 November 2004	list
(223923) 2004 WL_{3}	17 November 2004	list
(223924) 2004 WR_{4}	18 November 2004	list
(223925) 2004 WS_{4}	18 November 2004	list
(223946) 2004 XX_{33}	11 December 2004	list
(223947) 2004 XB_{34}	11 December 2004	list
(223948) 2004 XC_{34}	11 December 2004	list
(223953) 2004 XC_{52}	12 December 2004	list
(224121) 2005 QM_{10}	25 August 2005	list
(224147) 2005 QL_{51}	26 August 2005	list
(226139) 2002 RQ_{123}	9 September 2002	list
(226170) 2002 TM_{62}	3 October 2002	list
(226175) 2002 TP_{97}	2 October 2002	list

(226316) 2003 DU_{11}	25 February 2003	list
(226387) 2003 OD_{20}	30 July 2003	list
(226392) 2003 QL_{4}	18 August 2003	list
(226394) 2003 QM_{6}	19 August 2003	list
(226395) 2003 QZ_{13}	19 August 2003	list
(226415) 2003 QE_{114}	23 August 2003	list
(226420) 2003 RF_{7}	4 September 2003	list
(226445) 2003 SP_{66}	18 September 2003	list
(226972) 2004 WV_{1}	17 November 2004	list
(226987) 2004 XE_{44}	11 December 2004	list
(227003) 2004 XF_{89}	10 December 2004	list
(227093) 2005 MZ_{25}	27 June 2005	list
(227157) 2005 QR_{10}	26 August 2005	list
(227170) 2005 QQ_{38}	25 August 2005	list
(227223) 2005 RA_{21}	1 September 2005	list
(228886) 2003 QF_{28}	21 August 2003	list
(228933) 2003 SY_{320}	18 September 2003	list
(229072) 2004 HO_{36}	21 April 2004	list
(229230) 2004 XU_{36}	11 December 2004	list
(229335) 2005 QY_{9}	25 August 2005	list
(230457) 2002 RS_{118}	7 September 2002	list
(230634) 2003 QR_{2}	19 August 2003	list
(230642) 2003 QW_{114}	21 August 2003	list
(230945) 2004 XQ_{36}	11 December 2004	list
(231070) 2005 QN_{19}	25 August 2005	list

(232234) 2002 NL_{5}	10 July 2002	list
(232252) 2002 PZ_{65}	5 August 2002	list
(232488) 2003 OW_{3}	22 July 2003	list
(232503) 2003 QF_{27}	23 August 2003	list
(232776) 2004 PU_{75}	8 August 2004	list
(232898) 2004 XM_{41}	11 December 2004	list
(233076) 2005 ND_{15}	1 July 2005	list
(234611) 2002 AN_{67}	9 January 2002	list
(234831) 2002 RG_{120}	3 September 2002	list
(234832) 2002 RF_{125}	9 September 2002	list
(234883) 2002 TW_{61}	3 October 2002	list
(234960) 2002 WS_{13}	28 November 2002	list
(235008) 2003 DQ_{9}	25 February 2003	list
(235009) 2003 DB_{12}	25 February 2003	list
(235028) 2003 FA_{6}	26 March 2003	list
(235029) 2003 FC_{6}	26 March 2003	list
(235055) 2003 FF_{75}	26 March 2003	list
(235085) 2003 HM_{11}	23 April 2003	list
(235087) 2003 HX_{13}	25 April 2003	list
(235117) 2003 QL_{6}	18 August 2003	list
(235119) 2003 QF_{11}	20 August 2003	list
(235176) 2003 SP_{64}	18 September 2003	list
(235178) 2003 SN_{66}	18 September 2003	list
(235596) 2004 PP_{46}	7 August 2004	list
(235771) 2004 VC_{23}	5 November 2004	list

(235802) 2004 XY_{33}	11 December 2004	list
(235818) 2004 XB_{89}	10 December 2004	list
(235851) 2005 AF_{25}	8 January 2005	list
(238000) 2002 TD_{61}	3 October 2002	list
(238121) 2003 OO_{23}	22 July 2003	list
(238126) 2003 QW	18 August 2003	list
(238127) 2003 QB_{5}	20 August 2003	list
(238164) 2003 SX_{121}	17 September 2003	list
(238193) 2003 SB_{321}	19 September 2003	list
(240163) 2002 PG_{33}	5 August 2002	list
(240331) 2003 OX_{3}	22 July 2003	list
(240332) 2003 OH_{4}	21 July 2003	list
(240339) 2003 QQ_{24}	21 August 2003	list
(240504) 2004 ED_{54}	15 March 2004	list
(240613) 2004 XW_{33}	11 December 2004	list
(240616) 2004 XH_{62}	14 December 2004	list
(241910) 2002 AH_{12}	10 January 2002	list
(241990) 2002 NN_{5}	10 July 2002	list
(242067) 2002 TF_{70}	2 October 2002	list
(242184) 2003 HY_{54}	25 April 2003	list
(242193) 2003 OU_{1}	21 July 2003	list
(242194) 2003 OS_{19}	30 July 2003	list
(242204) 2003 QC_{27}	22 August 2003	list
(242236) 2003 SE_{140}	19 September 2003	list
(242264) 2003 SY_{327}	19 September 2003	list

(242438) 2004 PQ_{9}	6 August 2004	list
(242447) 2004 PG_{106}	14 August 2004	list
(242753) 2005 VW_{112}	9 November 2005	list
(244355) 2002 MH	17 June 2002	list
(244362) 2002 NN_{38}	9 July 2002	list
(244379) 2002 PK_{11}	5 August 2002	list
(244493) 2002 TB_{62}	3 October 2002	list
(244494) 2002 TB_{63}	3 October 2002	list
(244654) 2003 HR_{9}	25 April 2003	list
(244656) 2003 HG_{12}	25 April 2003	list
(244692) 2003 QA_{3}	19 August 2003	list
(244694) 2003 QQ_{5}	20 August 2003	list
(244696) 2003 QZ_{11}	21 August 2003	list
(244698) 2003 QQ_{16}	20 August 2003	list
(244702) 2003 QQ_{23}	21 August 2003	list
(244703) 2003 QS_{23}	21 August 2003	list
(244727) 2003 QX_{114}	21 August 2003	list
(245106) 2004 PL_{70}	7 August 2004	list
(245109) 2004 PR_{89}	10 August 2004	list
(245491) 2005 QZ_{38}	25 August 2005	list
(247707) 2003 DA_{7}	23 February 2003	list
(247708) 2003 DT_{14}	25 February 2003	list
(247721) 2003 FX_{83}	28 March 2003	list
(247758) 2003 QH_{4}	18 August 2003	list
(247759) 2003 QE_{5}	21 August 2003	list

(247811) 2003 SY_{121}	17 September 2003	list
(248055) 2004 LT_{5}	10 June 2004	list
(248065) 2004 OZ	16 July 2004	list
(248074) 2004 PD_{56}	8 August 2004	list
(248331) 2005 QP_{38}	25 August 2005	list
(248364) 2005 QO_{166}	26 August 2005	list
(250117) 2002 NZ_{5}	10 July 2002	list
(250293) 2003 QA_{2}	19 August 2003	list
(250294) 2003 QJ_{2}	19 August 2003	list
(250295) 2003 QR_{4}	19 August 2003	list
(250529) 2004 PT_{75}	8 August 2004	list
(250671) 2005 OX_{7}	30 July 2005	list
(250704) 2005 QC_{183}	30 August 2005	list
(250705) 2005 QF_{189}	30 August 2005	list
(252933) 2002 PJ_{6}	2 August 2002	list
(253371) 2003 HK_{12}	26 April 2003	list
(253378) 2003 HJ_{55}	25 April 2003	list
(253396) 2003 OL_{6}	22 July 2003	list
(253398) 2003 OE_{20}	30 July 2003	list
(253405) 2003 QE	18 August 2003	list
(253444) 2003 RA_{6}	4 September 2003	list
(253492) 2003 SM_{94}	19 September 2003	list
(253505) 2003 SC_{136}	19 September 2003	list
(253975) 2004 EO_{22}	15 March 2004	list
(253985) 2004 EC_{54}	15 March 2004	list

(254013) 2004 FC_{37}	16 March 2004	list
(254121) 2004 OO_{12}	16 July 2004	list
(254125) 2004 PG_{10}	6 August 2004	list
(254131) 2004 PT_{16}	7 August 2004	list
(254158) 2004 PR_{93}	7 August 2004	list
(254162) 2004 PH_{109}	12 August 2004	list
(254664) 2005 KA_{13}	28 May 2005	list
(255294) 2005 VS_{112}	9 November 2005	list
(258474) 2002 AE_{12}	10 January 2002	list
(258475) 2002 AL_{12}	10 January 2002	list
(258809) 2002 NV_{6}	11 July 2002	list
(258844) 2002 PY_{65}	5 August 2002	list
(258995) 2002 TC_{63}	3 October 2002	list
(259007) 2002 TV_{110}	2 October 2002	list
(259013) 2002 TJ_{122}	3 October 2002	list
(259366) 2003 HL_{11}	23 April 2003	list
(259396) 2003 QH	18 August 2003	list
(259398) 2003 QT_{2}	19 August 2003	list
(259399) 2003 QG_{5}	20 August 2003	list
(259400) 2003 QZ_{5}	19 August 2003	list
(259401) 2003 QZ_{8}	20 August 2003	list
(259403) 2003 QL_{24}	21 August 2003	list
(259433) 2003 SE_{17}	18 September 2003	list
(259456) 2003 SH_{88}	18 September 2003	list
(260087) 2004 KS_{6}	18 May 2004	list

(260120) 2004 PJ_{36}	9 August 2004	list
(260396) 2004 WK_{3}	17 November 2004	list
(260434) 2004 XQ_{114}	10 December 2004	list
(260453) 2005 AJ_{25}	8 January 2005	list
(260725) 2005 KL_{11}	29 May 2005	list
(260791) 2005 NZ_{46}	6 July 2005	list
(260831) 2005 QU_{21}	26 August 2005	list
(260855) 2005 QH_{84}	30 August 2005	list
(261473) 2005 VQ_{114}	10 November 2005	list
(264861) 2002 RK_{126}	8 September 2002	list
(264912) 2002 TF_{214}	3 October 2002	list
(264991) 2003 DD_{9}	24 February 2003	list
(264992) 2003 DJ_{9}	24 February 2003	list
(265019) 2003 HS_{1}	23 April 2003	list
(265028) 2003 MZ_{12}	24 June 2003	list
(265034) 2003 OT_{19}	31 July 2003	list
(265040) 2003 QQ_{2}	19 August 2003	list
(265041) 2003 QB_{7}	20 August 2003	list
(265052) 2003 QD_{114}	22 August 2003	list
(265074) 2003 SD_{140}	18 September 2003	list
(265329) 2004 PC_{10}	6 August 2004	list
(267514) 2002 ND_{44}	11 July 2002	list
(267654) 2002 TX_{62}	3 October 2002	list
(267787) 2003 ST_{182}	20 September 2003	list
(267941) 2004 EN_{22}	15 March 2004	list

(268013) 2004 MF_{7}	24 June 2004	list
(268014) 2004 NR	6 July 2004	list
(268036) 2004 PS_{68}	7 August 2004	list
(268170) 2004 WK_{4}	17 November 2004	list
(268179) 2004 XE_{89}	10 December 2004	list
(268186) 2004 XF_{179}	14 December 2004	list
(268192) 2005 AU_{18}	8 January 2005	list
(269631) 2011 AG_{29}	15 January 1997	list
(270374) 2002 AB_{12}	10 January 2002	list
(270626) 2002 PA_{34}	6 August 2002	list
(270628) 2002 PU_{34}	5 August 2002	list
(270629) 2002 PB_{35}	5 August 2002	list
(270863) 2002 TH_{86}	2 October 2002	list
(270869) 2002 TE_{99}	3 October 2002	list
(270888) 2002 TE_{214}	3 October 2002	list
(271044) 2003 FK_{6}	27 March 2003	list
(271083) 2003 ON_{23}	22 July 2003	list
(271085) 2003 QB_{3}	19 August 2003	list
(271086) 2003 QD_{4}	18 August 2003	list
(271095) 2003 QD_{27}	22 August 2003	list
(271106) 2003 QL_{114}	23 August 2003	list
(271130) 2003 SV_{63}	17 September 2003	list
(271147) 2003 SF_{162}	19 September 2003	list
(271179) 2003 SH_{281}	18 September 2003	list
(271194) 2003 SA_{321}	19 September 2003	list

(271195) 2003 SF_{321}	19 September 2003	list
(271202) 2003 SS_{352}	19 September 2003	list
(271557) 2004 JR_{31}	15 May 2004	list
(271606) 2004 PP_{9}	6 August 2004	list
(271618) 2004 PT_{46}	8 August 2004	list
(271632) 2004 PK_{70}	7 August 2004	list
(271918) 2004 XB_{44}	11 December 2004	list
(271922) 2004 XA_{70}	10 December 2004	list
(271952) 2005 AN_{25}	8 January 2005	list
(271972) 2005 AU_{82}	8 January 2005	list
(272269) 2005 RS_{2}	2 September 2005	list
(273461) 2006 XX_{44}	6 September 2002	list
(275029) 2009 UB_{37}	21 November 2004	list
(276019) 2002 AF_{13}	11 January 2002	list
(276027) 2002 AJ_{67}	9 January 2002	list
(276491) 2003 QK_{4}	18 August 2003	list
(276493) 2003 QZ_{16}	21 August 2003	list
(276543) 2003 SA_{88}	17 September 2003	list
(276553) 2003 SG_{136}	19 September 2003	list
(276578) 2003 SV_{282}	20 September 2003	list
(276588) 2003 SB_{328}	20 September 2003	list
(276803) 2004 PJ_{10}	6 August 2004	list
(276982) 2004 WD_{1}	17 November 2004	list
(276990) 2004 XD_{30}	10 December 2004	list
(276997) 2004 XA_{51}	14 December 2004	list

(277008) 2004 XV_{130}	14 December 2004	list
(277045) 2005 CC_{81}	9 February 2005	list
(279578) 2011 DF_{23}	16 March 2004	list
(280244) 2002 WP11	27 November 2002	list
(280301) 2003 QM_{23}	20 August 2003	list
(280337) 2003 SK_{138}	19 September 2003	list
(280340) 2003 SX_{159}	19 September 2003	list
(280605) 2004 WX_{1}	17 November 2004	list
(280606) 2004 WT_{8}	18 November 2004	list
(280631) 2004 XN_{145}	14 December 2004	list
(280751) 2005 QR_{19}	25 August 2005	list
(281956) 2011 GU_{55}	10 February 2005	list
(282359) 2003 HG_{16}	25 April 2003	list
(282373) 2003 QK_{16}	20 August 2003	list
(282500) 2004 PL_{62}	10 August 2004	list
(283751) 2003 DR_{11}	25 February 2003	list
(283774) 2003 OE_{1}	22 July 2003	list
(284041) 2005 AD_{25}	8 January 2005	list
(286431) 2002 AQ_{12}	10 January 2002	list
(286432) 2002 AG_{13}	11 January 2002	list
(286446) 2002 AC_{67}	9 January 2002	list
(286887) 2002 PP_{11}	5 August 2002	list
(286893) 2002 PL_{33}	6 August 2002	list
(287223) 2002 TA_{11}	2 October 2002	list
(287243) 2002 TM_{63}	3 October 2002	list

(287244) 2002 TN_{63}	3 October 2002	list
(287245) 2002 TQ_{63}	4 October 2002	list
(287246) 2002 TR_{63}	4 October 2002	list
(287263) 2002 TA_{145}	2 October 2002	list
(287264) 2002 TB_{145}	2 October 2002	list
(287531) 2003 DZ_{6}	23 February 2003	list
(287534) 2003 DY_{12}	26 February 2003	list
(287620) 2003 HW_{13}	25 April 2003	list
(287636) 2003 HW_{54}	24 April 2003	list
(287671) 2003 OE_{23}	30 July 2003	list
(287675) 2003 QE_{1}	19 August 2003	list
(287676) 2003 QP_{1}	19 August 2003	list
(287678) 2003 QY_{4}	20 August 2003	list
(287679) 2003 QV_{6}	20 August 2003	list
(287683) 2003 QA_{17}	21 August 2003	list
(287726) 2003 RC_{8}	4 September 2003	list
(287763) 2003 SY_{63}	17 September 2003	list
(287775) 2003 SD_{88}	18 September 2003	list
(288482) 2004 FQ_{22}	16 March 2004	list
(288641) 2004 PD_{36}	9 August 2004	list
(288648) 2004 PZ_{43}	6 August 2004	list
(288650) 2004 PV_{46}	8 August 2004	list
(288658) 2004 PE_{56}	9 August 2004	list
(288665) 2004 PJ_{62}	10 August 2004	list
(288724) 2004 RN_{42}	8 September 2004	list

(289191) 2004 WE_{1}	17 November 2004	list
(289221) 2004 XL_{41}	11 December 2004	list
(289222) 2004 XG_{44}	11 December 2004	list
(289254) 2004 XK_{89}	10 December 2004	list
(289271) 2004 XA_{144}	12 December 2004	list
(289274) 2004 XH_{148}	15 December 2004	list
(289275) 2004 XC_{149}	14 December 2004	list
(289913) 2005 NF_{13}	4 July 2005	list
(290021) 2005 QY_{19}	26 August 2005	list
(290041) 2005 QR_{38}	25 August 2005	list
(290042) 2005 QU_{38}	25 August 2005	list
(290130) 2005 QC_{153}	27 August 2005	list
(294526) 2007 XQ_{30}	8 January 2005	list
(297171) 2010 VD_{112}	18 July 2004	list
(297617) 2001 TZ_{16}	12 October 2001	list
(298161) 2002 TP_{62}	3 October 2002	list
(298170) 2002 TS_{145}	3 October 2002	list
(298308) 2003 DR_{12}	26 February 2003	list
(298320) 2003 EK_{50}	10 March 2003	list
(298784) 2004 PU_{46}	8 August 2004	list
(298792) 2004 PJ_{106}	14 August 2004	list
(298979) 2004 WL_{1}	17 November 2004	list
(302322) 2002 AE_{67}	9 January 2002	list
(302530) 2002 LC_{58}	13 June 2002	list
(302560) 2002 PG	1 August 2002	list

(302677) 2002 SH_{74}	18 September 2002	list
(302686) 2002 TJ_{61}	3 October 2002	list
(302687) 2002 TZ_{61}	3 October 2002	list
(302689) 2002 TE_{70}	2 October 2002	list
(302870) 2003 HF_{16}	25 April 2003	list
(302894) 2003 QM	18 August 2003	list
(302895) 2003 QD_{5}	20 August 2003	list
(302896) 2003 QA_{7}	20 August 2003	list
(303221) 2004 NC	6 July 2004	list
(303222) 2004 NV	7 July 2004	list
(303240) 2004 PP_{68}	6 August 2004	list
(303267) 2004 RV_{136}	8 September 2004	list
(303367) 2004 VE_{23}	5 November 2004	list
(303377) 2004 WZ_{1}	17 November 2004	list
(303410) 2004 XX_{180}	14 December 2004	list
(303727) 2005 QO_{38}	25 August 2005	list
(303728) 2005 QY_{38}	25 August 2005	list
(306125) 2010 JW_{87}	20 August 2003	list
(306237) 2011 QV_{67}	11 December 2004	list
(307259) 2002 MN_{1}	19 June 2002	list
(307400) 2002 TA_{111}	2 October 2002	list
(307403) 2002 TU_{145}	3 October 2002	list
(307563) 2003 FF_{6}	27 March 2003	list
(307599) 2003 QK_{8}	20 August 2003	list
(307619) 2003 RL_{27}	6 September 2003	list

(307648) 2003 SE_{160}	20 September 2003	list
(307679) 2003 ST_{352}	20 September 2003	list
(307755) 2003 UF_{357}	20 September 2003	list
(308148) 2005 AY_{29}	8 January 2005	list
(308360) 2005 QY_{148}	31 August 2005	list
(310173) 2011 SQ_{30}	3 August 2002	list
(310886) 2003 QK_{24}	21 August 2003	list
(310895) 2003 RB_{6}	4 September 2003	list
(310910) 2003 SJ_{66}	18 September 2003	list
(311123) 2004 PQ_{96}	11 August 2004	list
(311136) 2004 RY_{136}	8 September 2004	list
(311206) 2004 XR_{144}	13 December 2004	list
(311464) 2005 UJ_{452}	28 October 2005	list
(312842) 2011 UW_{52}	23 April 2004	list
(313570) 2003 DS_{6}	23 February 2003	list
(313571) 2003 DG_{7}	23 February 2003	list
(313599) 2003 OF_{20}	30 July 2003	list
(313606) 2003 QB_{27}	22 August 2003	list
(313858) 2004 FZ_{9}	16 March 2004	list
(313896) 2004 KY_{18}	21 May 2004	list
(314017) 2004 WO_{3}	17 November 2004	list
(314019) 2004 WP_{11}	17 November 2004	list
(314024) 2004 XH_{30}	10 December 2004	list
(316460) 2010 UP_{91}	15 August 2004	list
(317636) 2003 DK_{11}	24 February 2003	list

(317670) 2003 HZ_{13}	25 April 2003	list
(317690) 2003 OA_{17}	28 July 2003	list
(317691) 2003 OG_{23}	31 July 2003	list
(317701) 2003 QZ_{2}	19 August 2003	list
(317705) 2003 QW_{8}	20 August 2003	list
(317713) 2003 QG_{28}	21 August 2003	list
(317717) 2003 QB_{33}	21 August 2003	list
(317779) 2003 SE_{138}	18 September 2003	list
(317795) 2003 SR_{182}	20 September 2003	list
(317796) 2003 SX_{182}	20 September 2003	list
(317830) 2003 SZ_{320}	18 September 2003	list
(317831) 2003 SC_{321}	19 September 2003	list
(318043) 2004 FG_{10}	16 March 2004	list
(318107) 2004 HN_{74}	15 January 1997	list
(318149) 2004 PC_{89}	8 August 2004	list
(318388) 2004 XE_{30}	10 December 2004	list
(318639) 2005 LH_{29}	27 May 2005	list
(318718) 2005 QM_{179}	25 August 2005	list
(319312) 2006 BD_{149}	7 August 2004	list
(322084) 2010 VS_{121}	15 August 2004	list
(322325) 2011 GU_{69}	6 August 2004	list
(323178) 2003 HT_{1}	23 April 2003	list
(323189) 2003 QJ_{1}	19 August 2003	list
(323192) 2003 QP_{16}	20 August 2003	list
(323266) 2003 SZ_{327}	19 September 2003	list

(323284) 2003 SU_{432}	20 September 2003	list
(323475) 2004 LQ_{5}	10 June 2004	list
(323524) 2004 RY_{115}	10 August 2004	list
(323632) 2004 WH_{4}	17 November 2004	list
(323768) 2005 QU_{19}	25 August 2005	list
(323769) 2005 QV_{21}	26 August 2005	list
(323773) 2005 QW_{38}	25 August 2005	list
(324606) 2006 YA_{10}	30 August 2005	list
(325968) 2010 VO_{128}	22 August 2003	list
(326013) 2010 WR_{54}	20 September 2003	list
(326511) 2002 NQ_{6}	11 July 2002	list
(326512) 2002 NS_{6}	11 July 2002	list
(326714) 2003 DL_{7}	23 February 2003	list
(326756) 2003 SW_{66}	19 September 2003	list
(326764) 2003 SQ_{141}	20 September 2003	list
(327099) 2004 XQ_{144}	13 December 2004	list
(327212) 2005 NY_{124}	4 July 2005	list
(329418) 2002 NV_{4}	10 July 2002	list
(329438) 2002 PL	1 August 2002	list
(329499) 2002 RL_{123}	8 September 2002	list
(329535) 2002 TL_{61}	3 October 2002	list
(329573) 2002 VQ_{131}	4 October 2002	list
(329598) 2003 DJ_{11}	24 February 2003	list
(329621) 2003 QW_{13}	18 August 2003	list
(329638) 2003 SX_{135}	19 September 2003	list

(329642) 2003 SN_{171}	18 September 2003	list
(329647) 2003 SJ_{192}	20 September 2003	list
(329784) 2004 NC_{30}	5 July 2004	list
(329786) 2004 PF_{17}	8 August 2004	list
(329816) 2004 RA_{137}	8 September 2004	list
(329826) 2004 RQ_{224}	8 September 2004	list
(329940) 2005 QG_{10}	25 August 2005	list
(329947) 2005 QA_{39}	26 August 2005	list
(331640) 2002 ND_{5}	10 July 2002	list
(331657) 2002 PF_{33}	5 August 2002	list
(331772) 2003 DO_{12}	26 February 2003	list
(331895) 2004 NW	7 July 2004	list
(331962) 2004 XA_{34}	11 December 2004	list
(331979) 2005 CB_{81}	10 February 2005	list
(332018) 2005 NH_{95}	6 July 2005	list
(332024) 2005 OO_{24}	30 July 2005	list
(332238) 2006 JH_{41}	22 August 2003	list
(333488) 2004 WN_{1}	17 November 2004	list
(334564) 2002 TC_{62}	3 October 2002	list
(334565) 2002 TE_{63}	3 October 2002	list
(334580) 2002 TF_{122}	3 October 2002	list
(334731) 2003 OH_{7}	24 July 2003	list
(334755) 2003 RJ_{7}	5 September 2003	list
(334765) 2003 SB_{64}	17 September 2003	list
(334766) 2003 SC_{64}	17 September 2003	list

(335170) 2004 XQ_{174}	10 December 2004	list
(335298) 2005 QE_{10}	25 August 2005	list
(336878) 2011 GL_{46}	21 August 2003	list
(337963) 2002 AF_{180}	9 January 2002	list
(338048) 2002 NL_{6}	11 July 2002	list
(338178) 2002 RJ_{126}	8 September 2002	list
(338227) 2002 TR_{62}	3 October 2002	list
(338235) 2002 TU_{85}	2 October 2002	list
(338436) 2003 DR_{9}	25 February 2003	list
(338455) 2003 FS_{5}	26 March 2003	list
(338506) 2003 QO_{5}	18 August 2003	list
(338573) 2003 SL_{94}	19 September 2003	list
(339042) 2004 JN_{31}	15 May 2004	list
(339046) 2004 KK_{11}	19 May 2004	list
(339047) 2004 LD_{11}	10 June 2004	list
(339066) 2004 PR_{68}	7 August 2004	list
(339610) 2005 OA_{8}	30 July 2005	list
(339630) 2005 QX_{9}	25 August 2005	list
(339682) 2005 QJ_{167}	27 August 2005	list
(344461) 2002 NK_{56}	11 July 2002	list
(344637) 2003 QE_{4}	18 August 2003	list
(344638) 2003 QK_{9}	20 August 2003	list
(344660) 2003 SV_{66}	19 September 2003	list
(344663) 2003 SY_{87}	17 September 2003	list
(344879) 2004 PW_{16}	7 August 2004	list

(344899) 2004 RT_{106}	8 September 2004	list
(344958) 2004 WL_{2}	17 November 2004	list
(344970) 2004 XX_{50}	14 December 2004	list
(345103) 2005 NA_{47}	7 July 2005	list
(346329) 2008 RZ_{18}	15 August 2004	list
(346538) 2008 UJ_{273}	17 November 2004	list
(347383) 2012 RB_{21}	8 January 2005	list
(347388) 2012 RF_{34}	4 October 2002	list
(347737) 2002 AM_{12}	10 January 2002	list
(347829) 2002 PP_{33}	6 August 2002	list
(347927) 2003 DZ_{12}	26 February 2003	list
(347953) 2003 QG	18 August 2003	list
(347990) 2003 SO_{136}	19 September 2003	list
(348180) 2004 PO_{10}	7 August 2004	list
(348185) 2004 PR_{46}	7 August 2004	list
(348205) 2004 RP_{42}	8 September 2004	list
(348287) 2004 XZ_{36}	11 December 2004	list
(348288) 2004 XQ_{41}	11 December 2004	list
(348295) 2004 XB_{149}	14 December 2004	list
(348434) 2005 QB_{19}	25 August 2005	list
(350049) 2010 OE_{91}	13 June 2005	list
(350097) 2011 OQ_{1}	26 February 2003	list
(350139) 2011 SN_{51}	5 September 2002	list
(350223) 2012 SH_{55}	17 November 2004	list
(350252) 2012 TD_{125}	19 September 2003	list

(350287) 2012 TQ_{286}	19 August 2003	list
(350770) 2002 AJ_{191}	12 January 2002	list
(350858) 2002 NK_{5}	10 July 2002	list
(351043) 2003 SL_{207}	21 September 2003	list
(351214) 2004 ND_{1}	7 July 2004	list
(351232) 2004 PF_{56}	9 August 2004	list
(351236) 2004 PU_{94}	10 August 2004	list
(351273) 2004 RQ_{238}	15 August 2004	list
(353395) 2011 OJ_{23}	6 August 2004	list
(353573) 2011 SK_{254}	23 February 2003	list
(354244) 2002 PT_{33}	6 August 2002	list
(354298) 2002 TX_{110}	2 October 2002	list
(354368) 2003 QS_{4}	19 August 2003	list
(354685) 2005 PB_{19}	2 August 2005	list
(356803) 2011 UH_{336}	9 August 2004	list
(357339) 2003 QB_{12}	21 August 2003	list
(357489) 2004 KH	16 May 2004	list
(357496) 2004 PK_{30}	8 August 2004	list
(358658) 2007 VJ_{331}	11 July 2002	list
(359496) 2010 OA_{118}	7 August 2004	list
(359567) 2010 TT_{116}	18 May 2004	list
(359693) 2011 SL_{184}	9 September 2002	list
(359846) 2011 UR_{351}	26 February 2003	list
(360505) 2003 HM_{55}	25 April 2003	list
(360511) 2003 OE_{7}	24 July 2003	list

(360513) 2003 QE_{3}	19 August 2003	list
(360515) 2003 QO_{9}	20 August 2003	list
(360761) 2004 XY_{180}	15 December 2004	list
(360824) 2005 KO_{11}	28 May 2005	list
(361045) 2005 XQ_{78}	9 November 2005	list
(361881) 2008 FJ_{58}	25 April 2003	list
(362940) 2012 XH_{50}	21 August 2003	list
(363000) 2013 CN_{174}	27 February 2003	list
(363407) 2003 QY_{1}	19 August 2003	list
(363514) 2003 UJ_{106}	21 September 2003	list
(363727) 2004 WS_{1}	17 November 2004	list
(363837) 2005 QN_{10}	25 August 2005	list
(363842) 2005 QM_{38}	25 August 2005	list
(364918) 2008 EX_{157}	19 May 2004	list
(364948) 2008 GQ_{23}	26 February 2003	list
(366116) 2012 DM_{30}	10 August 2004	list
(366260) 2013 AM_{7}	5 September 2002	list
(366498) 2002 OV_{37}	2 August 2002	list
(366672) 2003 UW_{16}	16 October 2003	list
(366830) 2005 JT_{167}	12 May 2005	list
(367650) 2009 WR_{85}	13 December 2004	list
(367991) 2012 FL_{25}	29 May 2005	list
(368037) 2012 HD_{4}	20 August 2003	list
(368306) 2002 PB_{6}	2 August 2002	list
(368456) 2003 QH_{112}	21 August 2003	list

(368466) 2003 SZ_{135}	19 September 2003	list
(368578) 2004 PH_{56}	9 August 2004	list
(370230) 2002 PA_{64}	2 August 2002	list
(370316) 2002 RE_{120}	3 September 2002	list
(370379) 2002 TJ_{107}	4 October 2002	list
(370381) 2002 TH_{122}	3 October 2002	list
(370389) 2002 TP_{145}	3 October 2002	list
(370482) 2003 QA_{27}	22 August 2003	list
(370504) 2003 SM_{88}	18 September 2003	list
(370683) 2004 FL_{1}	16 March 2004	list
(370700) 2004 KV_{11}	21 May 2004	list
(370706) 2004 PN_{46}	7 August 2004	list
(370708) 2004 PQ_{75}	8 August 2004	list
(370873) 2005 ES_{85}	15 December 2004	list
(370936) 2005 QK_{166}	31 August 2005	list
(373270) 2012 HB_{19}	12 December 2004	list
(373640) 2002 PF_{6}	2 August 2002	list
(373643) 2002 PR_{34}	2 August 2002	list
(373739) 2002 TE_{52}	8 September 2002	list
(373746) 2002 TS_{85}	2 October 2002	list
(373847) 2003 GM_{12}	27 February 2003	list
(373853) 2003 OP_{23}	22 July 2003	list
(373855) 2003 QY_{6}	20 August 2003	list
(374269) 2005 LA_{43}	13 June 2005	list
(375771) 2009 ST_{150}	1 August 2005	list

(376358) 2011 JO_{5}	5 November 2004	list
(376447) 2012 HF_{50}	17 November 2004	list
(376549) 2013 KJ_{2}	5 September 2002	list
(376974) 2002 NF_{5}	10 July 2002	list
(376989) 2002 PM_{33}	6 August 2002	list
(377056) 2002 TH_{262}	4 October 2002	list
(377153) 2003 SR_{137}	21 September 2003	list
(377545) 2005 HP_{6}	27 April 2005	list
(377692) 2005 VU_{112}	9 November 2005	list
(379256) 2009 TZ_{47}	31 August 2005	list
(380055) 2013 RV_{74}	22 August 2003	list
(380236) 2001 TY_{16}	12 October 2001	list
(380360) 2002 TN_{62}	3 October 2002	list
(380361) 2002 TV_{85}	2 October 2002	list
(380536) 2004 HB_{49}	22 April 2004	list
(380540) 2004 KQ_{10}	19 May 2004	list
(380555) 2004 PZ_{16}	7 August 2004	list
(380559) 2004 PR_{106}	15 August 2004	list
(380569) 2004 RR_{25}	8 September 2004	list
(382659) 2002 TK_{61}	3 October 2002	list
(382765) 2003 QR_{23}	21 August 2003	list
(382851) 2004 EA_{54}	15 March 2004	list
(383040) 2005 QW_{19}	26 August 2005	list
(385137) 2013 SN_{51}	4 September 2002	list
(385442) 2003 OM_{6}	22 July 2003	list

(385452) 2003 SD_{64}	17 September 2003	list
(385455) 2003 SW_{236}	19 September 2003	list
(385537) 2004 RM_{42}	8 September 2004	list
(386900) 2011 HF_{29}	15 May 2004	list
(387063) 2012 TV_{54}	11 December 2004	list
(387341) 2012 WO_{6}	17 November 2004	list
(387633) 2002 PV_{64}	3 August 2002	list
(387652) 2002 RH_{120}	3 September 2002	list
(387676) 2002 TG_{63}	3 October 2002	list
(387744) 2003 HW_{57}	26 April 2003	list
(387843) 2004 ND	6 July 2004	list
(387905) 2004 WY_{1}	17 November 2004	list
(387909) 2004 XK_{49}	12 December 2004	list
(388964) 2008 TJ_{88}	13 December 2004	list
(389104) 2008 YB_{14}	17 November 2004	list
(389246) 2009 FR_{31}	5 September 2002	list
(389577) 2011 AV_{15}	13 August 2004	list
(389671) 2011 PW_{9}	20 August 2003	list
(389728) 2011 SX_{83}	10 December 2004	list
(389981) 2012 TB_{255}	20 September 2003	list
(390320) 2013 AG_{167}	23 February 2003	list
(390435) 2013 YW_{58}	21 April 2004	list
(390707) 2003 DR_{24}	26 February 2003	list
(392321) 2010 EP_{67}	19 September 2003	list
(392434) 2010 QS_{5}	26 March 2003	list

(392493) 2011 LJ_{17}	10 June 2004	list
(392527) 2011 QY_{60}	1 August 2005	list
(392599) 2011 SE_{225}	19 May 2004	list
(392706) 2012 BJ_{31}	15 December 2004	list
(392808) 2012 TD_{232}	21 August 2003	list
(393150) 2013 BY_{79}	15 March 2004	list
(393210) 2013 DO_{1}	13 December 2004	list
(393522) 2002 TJ_{111}	2 October 2002	list
(393741) 2005 CM_{58}	9 January 2005	list
(393857) 2005 SL_{209}	1 September 2005	list
(395325) 2011 QZ_{2}	13 December 2004	list
(395346) 2011 QS_{50}	7 August 2004	list
(395399) 2011 SO_{112}	17 November 2004	list
(395588) 2011 UR_{292}	20 September 2003	list
(395759) 2012 VL_{35}	7 January 2005	list
(395974) 2013 BT_{20}	17 November 2004	list
(396144) 2013 DJ_{9}	16 March 2004	list
(396262) 2014 CY_{14}	3 October 2002	list
(396362) 2014 DF_{89}	23 August 2003	list
(396687) 2002 TJ_{63}	3 October 2002	list
(396735) 2003 QD_{11}	20 August 2003	list
(396803) 2004 PS_{46}	8 August 2004	list
(396905) 2005 AG_{27}	15 December 2004	list
(397961) 2008 YR_{111}	13 December 2004	list
(399023) 2013 GB_{83}	20 May 2004	list

(399543) 2003 QU_{1}	19 August 2003	list
(399547) 2003 QT_{24}	22 August 2003	list
(399558) 2003 SR_{66}	18 September 2003	list
(399560) 2003 SC_{88}	18 September 2003	list
(399625) 2004 MK_{4}	22 June 2004	list
(399635) 2004 PY_{46}	8 August 2004	list
(399637) 2004 PQ_{68}	7 August 2004	list
(399638) 2004 PV_{111}	12 August 2004	list
(399647) 2004 RC_{74}	15 August 2004	list
(399720) 2004 WU_{4}	18 November 2004	list
(399764) 2005 JS_{167}	12 May 2005	list
(399837) 2005 UT_{8}	31 August 2005	list
(400722) 2009 SY_{96}	20 November 2004	list
(401068) 2011 UE_{59}	7 August 2004	list
(401126) 2011 UZ_{294}	15 May 2004	list
(401363) 2013 BZ_{39}	5 April 2005	list
(401384) 2013 CV_{26}	18 August 2003	list
(401750) 2013 JE_{59}	18 May 2004	list
(401948) 2002 PS_{179}	5 August 2002	list
(402002) 2003 QL	18 August 2003	list
(402003) 2003 QG_{10}	21 August 2003	list
(402004) 2003 QU_{32}	21 August 2003	list
(402014) 2003 RA_{27}	4 September 2003	list
(402112) 2004 BO_{102}	31 January 2004	list
(402134) 2004 PD_{29}	6 August 2004	list

(402144) 2004 RR_{28}	12 August 2004	list
(402207) 2004 WO_{1}	17 November 2004	list
(402780) 2007 CR_{31}	14 August 2004	list
(403826) 2011 UM_{179}	8 January 2005	list
(403889) 2011 WU_{117}	14 December 2004	list
(404150) 2013 CB_{32}	27 March 2003	list
(404654) 2014 HG_{43}	10 March 2003	list
(405153) 2002 TH_{64}	3 October 2002	list
(405233) 2003 SH_{111}	18 September 2003	list
(405241) 2003 SC_{140}	18 September 2003	list
(405562) 2005 OJ_{3}	30 July 2005	list
(405566) 2005 QC_{19}	25 August 2005	list
(405568) 2005 QB_{60}	26 August 2005	list
(407058) 2009 SF_{151}	17 November 2004	list
(407067) 2009 SF_{169}	14 August 2004	list
(407463) 2010 UC_{62}	26 February 2003	list
(407757) 2011 WW_{54}	15 December 2004	list
(407773) 2011 WV_{114}	7 January 2005	list
(408072) 2012 GY_{30}	20 September 2003	list
(408648) 2014 MA_{15}	21 August 2003	list
(409111) 2003 TW_{27}	21 September 2003	list
(409273) 2004 RH_{96}	9 August 2004	list
(411131) 2009 WA_{216}	21 August 2003	list
(411813) 2012 DX_{27}	24 February 2003	list
(411847) 2012 DP_{65}	16 March 2004	list

(411894) 2012 FC_{40}	19 August 2003	list
(411947) 2012 GE_{37}	17 November 2004	list
(412450) 2014 GS_{14}	27 February 2003	list
(412614) 2014 OA_{100}	20 August 2003	list
(412866) 2014 QC_{1}	7 August 2004	list
(413224) 2003 RF_{9}	21 August 2003	list
(413234) 2003 SF_{136}	19 September 2003	list
(413255) 2003 SJ_{393}	18 September 2003	list
(413500) 2005 QS_{38}	25 August 2005	list
(413503) 2005 QM_{84}	30 August 2005	list
(414107) 2007 TS_{386}	24 July 2003	list
(415522) 2014 QK_{28}	20 September 2003	list
(416151) 2002 RQ25	3 September 2002	list
(416188) 2002 TR_{85}	2 October 2002	list
(416284) 2003 OP_{21}	28 July 2003	list
(416600) 2004 PV_{68}	7 August 2004	list
(416867) 2005 NG_{95}	6 July 2005	list
(417774) 2007 EY_{4}	10 March 2003	list
(420341) 2012 BQ_{39}	14 December 2004	list
(420373) 2012 BN_{120}	9 January 2005	list
(420760) 2013 EM_{41}	20 August 2003	list
(421025) 2013 PR_{63}	28 October 2005	list
(421253) 2013 SM_{60}	15 August 2004	list
(421363) 2013 TU_{128}	8 July 2003	list
(421392) 2013 US_{14}	17 November 2004	list

(421781) 2014 QG_{22}	14 August 2004	list
(421791) 2014 QN_{27}	25 August 2005	list
(421834) 2014 QU_{117}	30 August 2005	list
(422217) 2014 RZ_{60}	9 January 2002	list
(422300) 2014 SX_{159}	19 September 2003	list
(422302) 2014 SB_{160}	19 May 2004	list
(422523) 2014 TW_{10}	13 December 2004	list
(422931) 2002 TP_{244}	4 October 2002	list
(422978) 2003 OR_{23}	22 July 2003	list
(422994) 2003 SB_{122}	17 September 2003	list
(422995) 2003 SQ_{137}	21 September 2003	list
(422996) 2003 SS_{177}	18 September 2003	list
(423037) 2003 UK_{74}	16 October 2003	list
(423187) 2004 LC_{13}	11 June 2004	list
(423276) 2004 WW_{11}	17 November 2004	list
(423436) 2005 QZ_{180}	30 August 2005	list
(424834) 2008 UJ_{241}	20 August 2003	list
(425255) 2009 WU_{77}	18 November 2004	list
(425555) 2010 RU_{120}	22 August 2003	list
(425811) 2011 DL_{15}	7 August 2004	list
(426364) 2013 NK_{16}	19 September 2003	list
(426400) 2013 PE_{49}	7 August 2004	list
(426515) 2013 RW_{44}	6 September 2003	list
(426614) 2013 SU_{50}	4 October 2002	list
(426873) 2013 WH_{28}	11 December 2004	list

(426939) 2013 YW_{3}	17 March 2005	list
(427577) 2003 OS_{18}	25 July 2003	list
(427578) 2003 QT_{4}	19 August 2003	list
(427594) 2003 SD_{122}	17 September 2003	list
(427595) 2003 SD_{130}	18 September 2003	list
(427596) 2003 SP_{137}	21 September 2003	list
(427864) 2005 QH_{10}	25 August 2005	list
(429398) 2010 RE_{78}	19 September 2003	list
(429458) 2010 VR_{215}	25 July 2003	list
(429665) 2011 GW_{61}	18 August 2003	list
(430240) 2013 WT_{6}	4 October 2002	list
(430628) 2003 QN_{23}	20 August 2003	list
(430639) 2003 SG_{64}	18 September 2003	list
(430645) 2003 SU_{135}	19 September 2003	list
(430743) 2004 JP_{31}	15 May 2004	list
(430747) 2004 NE	7 July 2004	list
(430877) 2005 QE_{79}	26 August 2005	list
(430878) 2005 QL_{84}	30 August 2005	list
(430884) 2005 QM_{141}	30 August 2005	list
(430886) 2005 QX_{148}	31 August 2005	list
(430893) 2005 RZ_{20}	1 September 2005	list
(430895) 2005 RO_{44}	1 September 2005	list
(431315) 2006 WQ_{55}	20 May 2004	list
(432494) 2010 EQ_{88}	22 August 2003	list
(432685) 2011 BS_{51}	21 April 2004	list

(432940) 2012 AY_{12}	30 August 2005	list
(433145) 2012 TD_{235}	16 March 2004	list
(433456) 2013 UX_{10}	7 September 2002	list
(433553) 2013 XT_{9}	10 January 2002	list
(433748) 2015 AJ_{263}	28 July 2003	list
(433749) 2015 AM_{263}	15 May 2004	list
(433826) 2015 BU_{198}	16 March 2004	list
(434166) 2002 TT_{63}	4 October 2002	list
(434182) 2002 WU_{26}	4 October 2002	list
(434206) 2003 QZ_{114}	23 August 2003	list
(434237) 2003 SJ_{333}	21 September 2003	list
(434448) 2005 ON_{24}	30 July 2005	list
(436390) 2010 VW_{79}	4 October 2002	list
(436473) 2011 DD_{42}	21 April 2004	list
(436751) 2011 WF_{116}	13 May 2005	list
(437679) 2014 CH_{21}	10 March 2003	list
(437954) 2002 TT_{57}	2 October 2002	list
(437973) 2003 QN_{24}	21 August 2003	list
(438044) 2004 NA_{1}	7 July 2004	list
(438049) 2004 PH_{36}	9 August 2004	list
(438055) 2004 PV_{106}	15 August 2004	list
(438093) 2004 XL_{30}	10 December 2004	list
(438120) 2005 QW_{9}	25 August 2005	list
(438125) 2005 QS_{79}	26 August 2005	list
(438249) 2005 WA_{40}	11 November 2005	list

(439048) 2011 GG_{4}	23 April 2004	list
(440080) 2002 TC_{61}	3 October 2002	list
(440107) 2003 HC_{14}	26 April 2003	list
(440110) 2003 QT_{13}	22 August 2003	list
(440115) 2003 SH_{58}	21 August 2003	list
(440127) 2003 SG_{281}	18 September 2003	list
(440226) 2004 PN_{66}	10 August 2004	list
(442067) 2010 RD_{144}	26 April 2003	list
(442117) 2010 TK_{173}	15 August 2004	list
(443133) 2014 BW_{16}	23 February 2003	list
(443143) 2014 BB_{37}	24 April 2003	list
(443259) 2014 EB_{11}	10 December 2004	list
(443775) 2015 MW_{65}	19 May 2004	list
(443913) 2002 PO	2 August 2002	list
(443987) 2003 WP_{77}	20 November 2003	list
(444033) 2004 PE_{29}	6 August 2004	list
(444049) 2004 RQ_{42}	8 September 2004	list
(444097) 2004 TY_{34}	9 September 2004	list
(444146) 2004 WO_{4}	17 November 2004	list
(445963) 2013 AG_{112}	17 November 2004	list
(446077) 2013 CE_{169}	17 November 2004	list
(446608) 2015 MA_{59}	14 December 2004	list
(446723) 2015 OU_{69}	15 August 2004	list
(446782) 2015 PN_{293}	5 September 2003	list
(447018) 2004 KH_{11}	19 May 2004	list

(447027) 2004 OH_{13}	18 July 2004	list
(447139) 2005 CP_{23}	8 January 2005	list
(449948) 2015 OJ_{68}	19 August 2003	list
(450029) 2015 QE_{11}	6 August 2004	list
(450209) 2002 PZ_{34}	5 August 2002	list
(450704) 2006 WX_{176}	23 February 2003	list
(451778) 2013 GM_{91}	11 December 2004	list
(451856) 2014 DM_{110}	8 September 2004	list
(452455) 2003 SR_{352}	19 September 2003	list
(452495) 2004 PO_{22}	16 July 2004	list
(453056) 2007 TC_{240}	18 September 2003	list
(453867) 2011 UX_{102}	20 September 2003	list
(454172) 2013 GL_{1}	20 August 2003	list
(454287) 2014 HV_{186}	7 August 2004	list
(454330) 2014 KZ_{75}	16 July 2004	list
(454429) 2014 OP_{13}	19 September 2003	list
(454700) 2014 SP_{91}	19 August 2003	list
(454864) 2015 SU_{19}	13 December 2004	list
(454904) 2015 TW_{113}	14 December 2004	list
(455017) 2015 TN_{298}	7 August 2004	list
(455349) 2002 RH_{112}	5 September 2002	list
(455362) 2002 TP_{107}	4 October 2002	list
(455439) 2003 SA_{65}	18 September 2003	list
(455562) 2004 PM_{70}	8 August 2004	list
(455658) 2005 AS_{82}	8 January 2005	list

(455738) 2005 JD	1 May 2005	list
(455779) 2005 QX_{19}	26 August 2005	list
(457151) 2008 FE_{133}	20 May 2004	list
(458768) 2011 SK_{57}	17 November 2004	list
(458769) 2011 SF_{64}	7 August 2004	list
(458783) 2011 SE_{119}	14 August 2004	list
(459389) 2012 KQ_{19}	24 April 2003	list
(460100) 2014 PH_{5}	10 August 2004	list
(460346) 2014 RM_{25}	19 November 2003	list
(460923) 2014 WD_{224}	5 September 2003	list
(461014) 2014 WR_{392}	10 January 2002	list
(461082) 2015 AJ_{86}	22 July 2003	list
(461179) 2015 VE_{4}	14 December 2004	list
(461249) 2015 XL_{2}	18 November 2004	list
(461504) 2003 HE_{16}	25 April 2003	list
(461543) 2003 UF_{205}	20 September 2003	list
(463375) 2013 AX_{96}	13 December 2004	list
(463421) 2013 JH_{6}	27 March 2003	list
(463470) 2013 PP_{35}	15 August 2004	list
(463900) 2014 UT_{108}	10 August 2004	list
(464034) 2014 WR_{158}	17 November 2004	list
(464703) 2002 PB_{64}	2 August 2002	list
(464744) 2003 QO_{48}	20 August 2003	list
(464829) 2004 XY_{36}	11 December 2004	list
(464832) 2005 BG_{26}	21 November 2004	list

(465640) 2009 MN_{9}	29 May 2005	list
(465715) 2009 UT_{66}	19 May 2004	list
(466926) 2016 AE	12 December 2004	list
(467052) 2016 DN_{6}	26 March 2003	list
(467119) 2016 EC_{73}	8 January 2005	list
(467268) 2016 EQ_{185}	19 August 2003	list
(467287) 2016 ET_{194}	17 November 2004	list
(467356) 2003 QJ_{9}	20 August 2003	list
(467391) 2005 AE_{58}	14 December 2004	list
(467513) 2007 ES_{150}	7 August 2004	list
(467577) 2007 UN_{2}	3 October 2002	list
(467863) 2011 AK_{28}	30 August 2005	list
(468449) 2003 MF_{1}	24 June 2003	list
(468489) 2005 AC_{25}	7 January 2005	list
(468510) 2005 QM_{51}	26 August 2005	list
(468511) 2005 QO_{142}	30 August 2005	list
(468908) 2014 BS_{61}	25 February 2003	list
(469165) 2015 KW_{39}	19 May 2004	list
(469512) 2003 QC_{7}	20 August 2003	list
(469561) 2003 UB_{252}	20 September 2003	list
(469619) 2004 RR_{42}	8 September 2004	list
(469642) 2004 TH_{56}	9 September 2004	list
(469717) 2005 LR_{4}	12 May 2005	list
(469752) 2005 QF_{10}	25 August 2005	list
(469756) 2005 QT_{21}	26 August 2005	list

(471011) 2009 SD_{261}	25 July 2003	list
(471220) 2010 WX_{27}	18 August 2003	list
(471639) 2012 TN_{67}	21 August 2003	list
(471968) 2013 TF_{62}	21 August 2003	list
(472086) 2013 YM_{128}	5 September 2002	list
(472199) 2014 EH_{8}	25 February 2003	list
(472707) 2015 FH_{42}	11 December 2004	list
(472875) 2015 FT_{302}	25 February 2003	list
(473118) 2015 HS_{176}	11 August 2004	list
(473311) 2015 RE_{101}	12 August 2004	list
(473472) 2015 XH_{66}	11 December 2004	list
(473512) 2015 XZ_{139}	29 August 2005	list
(473604) 2015 XX_{264}	21 August 2003	list
(473659) 2015 XM_{343}	21 November 2004	list
(474343) 2002 PJ	1 August 2002	list
(474441) 2003 OE_{13}	26 July 2003	list
(474446) 2003 QH_{99}	21 August 2003	list
(474475) 2003 SA_{221}	6 September 2003	list
(474488) 2003 SW_{337}	18 September 2003	list
(474592) 2004 PG_{30}	8 August 2004	list
(474598) 2004 RL_{42}	8 September 2004	list
(474786) 2005 QJ_{141}	30 August 2005	list
(474850) 2005 SN_{83}	1 September 2005	list
(477808) 2011 DY_{9}	16 March 2004	list
(477920) 2011 PO_{13}	6 August 2002	list

(478557) 2012 TS_{40}	14 August 2004	list
(478873) 2012 VZ_{97}	21 November 2004	list
(479069) 2013 AJ_{83}	20 May 2004	list
(479178) 2013 CP_{52}	19 November 2003	list
(479301) 2013 HD_{144}	17 November 2004	list
(479408) 2013 YQ_{49}	25 February 2003	list
(479789) 2014 EO_{48}	20 September 2003	list
(480254) 2015 HT_{60}	10 June 2004	list
(480476) 2015 LZ_{21}	10 May 2004	list
(480759) 2016 NJ_{45}	18 May 2004	list
(480774) 2016 PF_{12}	30 August 2005	list
(482198) 2010 VO_{91}	17 November 2004	list
(482457) 2012 FH_{44}	21 September 2003	list
(482830) 2013 YF_{73}	20 September 2003	list
(482929) 2014 JZ_{4}	16 January 1997	list
(483329) 2016 PX_{72}	30 July 2005	list
Discoveries are credited by the MPC to "CINEOS", "Campo Imperatore" or "Campo Imperatore Near Earth Object Survey"

== See also ==
- List of near-Earth object observation projects
