= (416151) 2002 RQ25 =

Carbonaceous asteroid of the Apollo group

(416151) 2002 RQ_{25}
Discovery
- Discovered by: CINEOS
- Discovery site: Campo Imperatore Obs.
- Discovery date: 3 September 2002

Designations
- Minor planet category: Apollo · NEO · PHA

Orbital characteristics
- Epoch 4 September 2017 (JD 2458000.5)
- Uncertainty parameter 0
- Observation arc: 14.13 yr (5,160 days)
- Aphelion: 1.4523 AU
- Perihelion: 0.7711 AU
- Semi-major axis: 1.1117 AU
- Eccentricity: 0.3064
- Orbital period (sidereal): 1.17 yr (428 days)
- Mean anomaly: 8.4222°
- Mean motion: 0° 50^{m} 26.88^{s} / day
- Inclination: 4.5766°
- Longitude of ascending node: 10.520°
- Argument of perihelion: 225.68°
- Earth MOID: 0.0499 AU · 19.4 LD

Physical characteristics
- Mean diameter: 0.225 km (calculated)
- Synodic rotation period: 12.191±0.005 h
- Geometric albedo: 0.20 (assumed)
- Spectral type: C · C/X
- Absolute magnitude (H): 20.6

(416151) 2002 RQ_{25} is a carbonaceous asteroid of the Apollo group, classified as near-Earth object and potentially hazardous asteroid, approximately 0.2 kilometers in diameter. It was discovered on 3 September 2002, by the Campo Imperatore Near-Earth Object Survey (CINEOS) at the Italian Campo Imperatore Observatory, located in the Abruzzo region, east of Rome.

== Orbit and classification ==
2002 RQ_{25} orbits the Sun at a distance of 0.8–1.5 AU once every 1 years and 2 months (428 days). Its orbit has an eccentricity of 0.31 and an inclination of 5° with respect to the ecliptic.

The asteroid's minimum orbit intersection distance with Earth is 0.0499 AU (7,460,000 km), which is currently exactly at the threshold limit of 0.05 AU (or about 19.5 lunar distances) to make it a potentially hazardous object.

== Physical characteristics ==
The carbonaceous C-type asteroid is also classified as a C/X-type body according to the survey carried out by NASA's Spitzer Space Telescope.

== Lightcurve ==
A rotational lightcurve of 2002 RQ_{25} was obtained from photometric observations made by American astronomer Brian Warner at his Palmer Divide Observatory, Colorado, in February 2015. The ambiguous lightcurve rendered a rotation period of 12.191±0.005 hours with a brightness variation of 0.72 magnitude (U=2+), while a second solution gave 6.096 hours (or half of the first period) with an amplitude of 0.43.

The Collaborative Asteroid Lightcurve Link assumes a standard albedo for stony asteroids of 0.20 and calculates diameter of 225 meters with an absolute magnitude of 20.6.

== Naming ==
As of 2017, this minor planet remains unnamed.
