= Monte Mario Observatory =

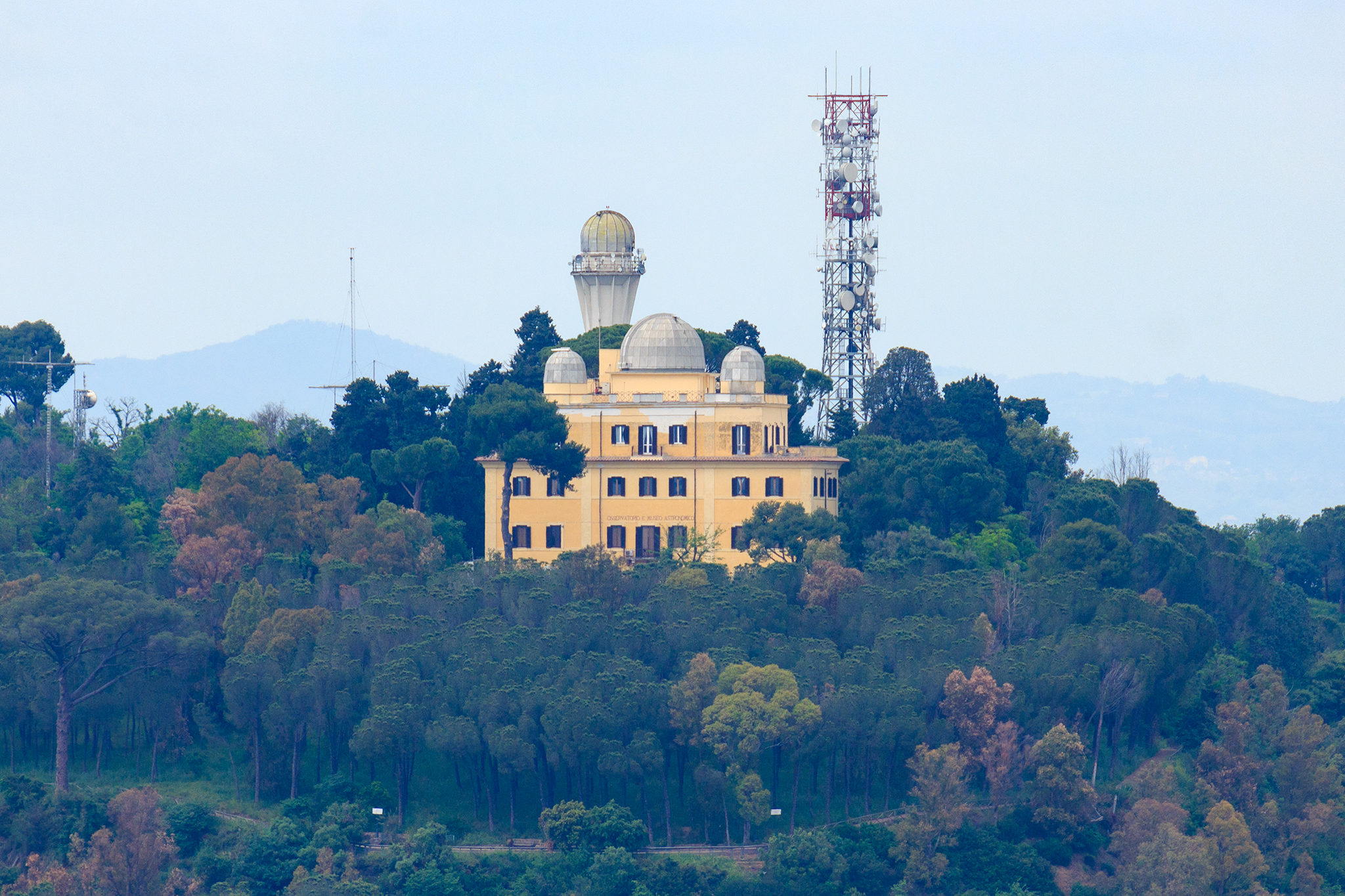
- Observatory code: 034
- Location: , Rome, Metropolitan City of Rome Capital, Lazio, Italy
- Coordinates: 41°55′21″N 12°27′09″E
- Altitude: 128 m (420 ft)
- Established: 1923
- Website: www.oa-roma.inaf.it/oar/monte-mario/
- Location of Monte Mario Observatory
- Related media on Commons

The Monte Mario Observatory (Sede di Monte Mario, literally "Site of Monte Mario") is an astronomical observatory and is administratively part of the Observatory of Rome (Osservatorio Astronomico di Roma). It is located atop Monte Mario, near the right bank of the river Tiber, in the municipality of Rome, Italy. This location (12°27'8.4"E ) was used as the prime meridian (rather than that of Greenwich) for maps of Italy until the 1960s.

== See also ==
- List of astronomical observatories
