= Rome Observatory =

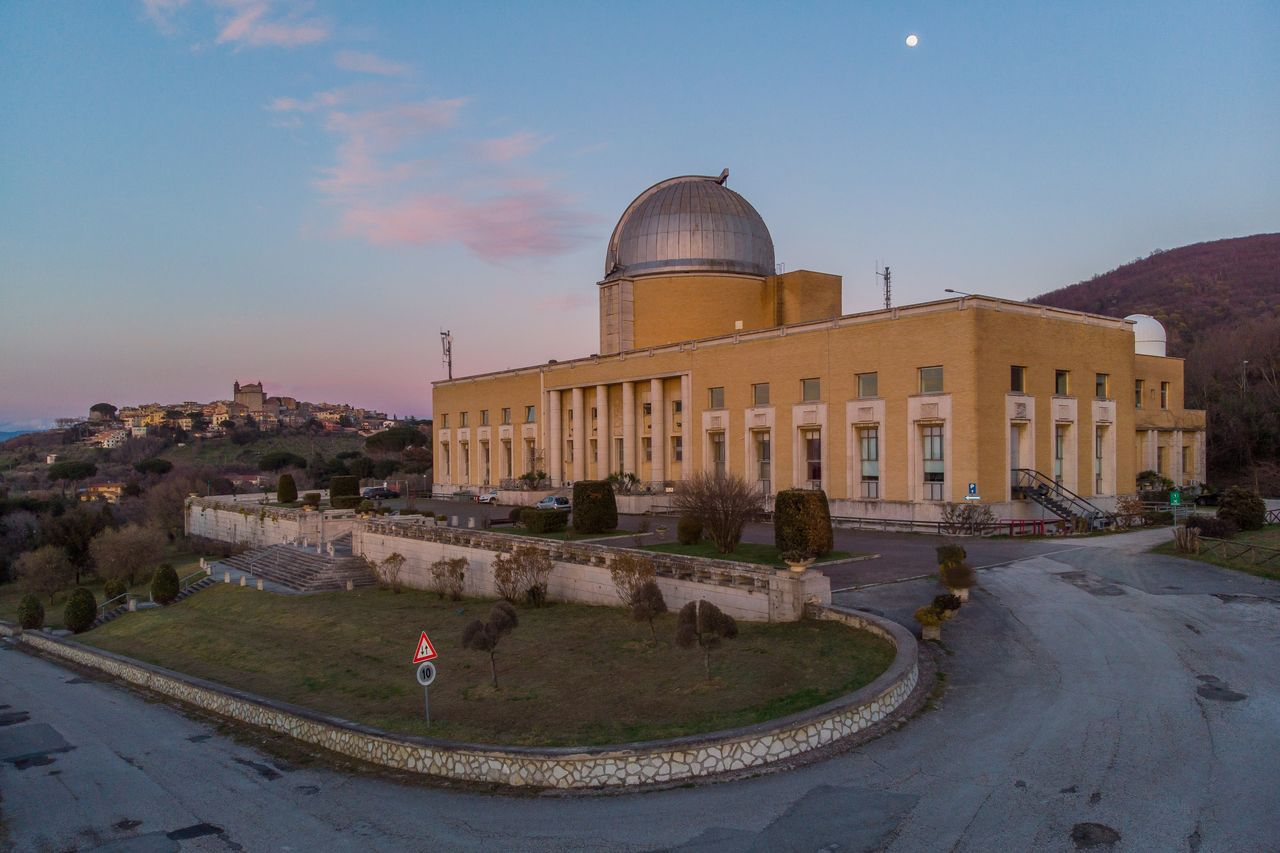
- Main seat of the Astronomical Observatory of Rome in Monte Porzio Catone
- Location: Italy
- Coordinates: 41°55′21″N 12°27′09″E
- Altitude: 128, 401 m (420, 1,316 ft)
- Established: 1938
- Website: www.oa-roma.inaf.it
- Telescopes: Campo Imperatore Astronomical Observatory; Monte Mario Observatory; astronomical observatory
- Related media on Commons

The Astronomical Observatory of Rome (Osservatorio Astronomico di Roma in Italian) is one of twelve Astronomical Observatories in Italy. The main site of the Observatory is Monte Porzio Catone. Part of the Istituto Nazionale di Astrofisica since 2002.

== Monte Mario ==
Monte Mario Observatory (IAU code 034), the "historical" Observatory of Rome, located at 84 via del Parco Mellini in the northwest part of the city, atop Monte Mario, since 2002 is only the administrative seat of the Istituto Nazionale di Astrofisica (INAF). Nevertheless, the Astronomical Observatory of Roma has the responsibility for the Astronomical Copernican Museum and the Solar Tower in Monte Mario.

== Monte Porzio Catone ==
Monte Porzio Catone is located approximately 20 kilometres southeast of Rome proper.

The Astronomical Observatory of Rome (OAR) was established in 1938, inside the 19th-century Villa Mellini on the hill of Monte Mario in Rome. In the same period, a new Observatory was built in Monteporzio Catone, in order to host a large telescope. With the Second World War, this project failed. In 1948, the building of Monteporzio was assigned to the Astronomical Observatory of Roma. In 1965, a new observing station was built in Campo Imperatore (2200 metres above sea level), on the Gran Sasso mountain. In 2017, the management of this station was transferred to the newly-established Osservatorio D’Abruzzo.

Since 1988, the researchers of the Astronomical Observatory of Rome have been carrying out their research activity in Monteporzio Catone.

The seat of Monteporzio includes the main building (three floors), the guesthouse, two small hoses for the janitors, AstroLAB, LightLAB, and the Monteporzio Telescope (MPT). These three latter structures are entirely devoted to public outreach. A few areas inside the main building are also occasionally used for visitors, i.e. historical rooms, “Livio Gratton” conference room, the modern library inside the main dome. The total area occupied by the structure within the compound sum up to about 8,750 square metres. Together with the garden, it adds up to about 75,000 square metres.

OAR is responsible for the management of the “Museo Astronomico e Copernicano” (Astronomical Copernican Museum – MAC), in the ground floor of Villa Mellini. MAC was established in 1873 by Arthur Wolynski, upon the basis of a Copernican collection, put together on the occasion of the fourth centenary of the birth of Copernicus. This collection was implemented over the years with scientific instruments and historical books belonging to the older Observatories in the centre of Rome, following the evolution of astronomical instruments, private donations, and public institutes. The Museum's collection includes, among other objects, 17th century eyepieces, 14th century telescopes, sextants for measuring the angular distance between stars, astrolabes and night dials (the oldest astrolabe dates back to the twelfth century). Moreover, there is a rich collection of armillary spheres, as well as sky and Earth globes, including Mercatore's and Cassini's. The old library contains about 4000 volumes, some of which are rare and precious. For instance, there is a fourteenth century manuscript code, which collects the main astronomical works of the time, 5 incunabula, over 270 “cinquecentine” (16th century books) and 450 “secentine” (17th century books). In particular, among books of ancient Astronomy, one could mention the first editions of Copernicus’ works, Ptolem's Almagestos, Sacrobosco's Sphaera, Hevel's Theatrum Cometarum, Scheiner's Rosa Ursina, and the first editions of Galilei's works.

Scientific and Technological Activity

OAR's scientific productivity is quite high among the 20 institutes belonging to INAF, as proved by ANVUR's National check and by Nature Index.

For example, in the year between November 2016 and November 2017, OAR researchers have taken part in writing 160 articles in referees reviews, which have produced 1597 citations. From 2014 to 2017, the total number of articles is 430, with 7555 citations.

The scientific activity covers all the research areas inside INAF. In the Eighties and Nineties, the scientific area which involved most researchers, and was therefore the most productive was Stellar Astrophysics, with a remarkable number of researchers who were active in the areas of Extra-galactic Astrophysics and Solar Astrophysics. Starting from the mid-Nineties, a number of researchers were recruited in the areas of Relativistic Astrophysics, and Astrophysics of the Solar System. Nowadays, the scientific areas which absorbs most young researchers are Extra-galactic Astrophysics and Cosmology.

OAR researchers make use of most Earth and space infrastructures, from radio to gamma rays:

- ALMA, NOEMA, JVLA
- VLT, LBT, TNG, HST
- Chandra, XMM, Nustar, Swift
- Fermi, Magic

OAR Researchers are either PI or are involved in a number of Large Programs on VLT, LBT, Chandra, and XMM.

Cutting-edge research is in the following areas:

Extra-galactic Astrophysics and Cosmology –

- Accelerated Evolution of the Universe, Dark Matter, Dark Energy
- The first stars, galaxies, black holes, re-ionization of the Universe
- Formatione and evolution of galaxies, and of their Active Galactic Nuclei (AGN)
- Discovery and characterization
- Physical processes, stellar formation, accretion upon black holes, feedback
- Semi-analytical Models

Stellar Astrophysics –

- Synthesis of stellar populations
- Stellar Clusters
- Galaxies and the Local Group
- The production of dust and stellar winds
- Models and observations of Supernovae
- Stellar Evolution and Astroseismology
- Stellar Formation and proto-stars

The Sun and the Solar System –

- The structure of the magnetic field in the solar atmosphere
- Research and characterization of minor bodies of the Solar System

Relativistic Astrophysics –

- Neutron Stars
- Anatomy of Magnetars
- X-ray pulsars
- Equation of state of neutron stars
- Gamma-Ray Burst, Physics and Astrophysics
- Multi-messenger Astrophysics (Gravitational waves and e electromagnetic signals)

OAR takes part in a large number of technological projects, both on the ground and in the space:

- ESO
  - REM – Remir
  - VLT/MOONS
  - Laser Guide Stars
  - E-ELT HIRES
- LBT
  - SHARK – PI of the VIS section, participation in NIR
  - LBC
  - LINK
- ESA
  - GAIA – software
  - Euclid – Science preparation, simulations, EBC participation, Lead OU-Mer
  - Athena – Science preparation, Ground Segment, Innovation center
  - Juice
  - Solar Orbiter
- CTA/ASTRI – Archive, Software for data analysis
- SAMM – Solar Telescope with magnetic-optical filters
- Management of the instruments in the observing station of Campo Imperatore, namely Schmidt and AZT telescopes
- NASA/NuSTAR – management of calls for the support to scientific research, and activities of the science team
- NASA/Osiris-REX

Laboratories and technological/scientific infrastructures

OAR hosts and optical lab and an electronic lab.

OAR hosts the LBT Italian Coordination Center, and manages proposals, observations, data reduction and analysis, as well as an archive of scientific data

OAR supports the activities of di ASI Science Data Center, manages its staff, and carries on a scientific and technological collaboration.

Museum, library, historical archive, Public Outreach and teaching

OAR has always been committed to Astronomy outreach and teaching.

OAR hosts AstroLAB (since 2001) and LightLAB (since 2013), interactive labs open to school groups. Every year, a total number of 5.000 to 10.000 pupils (from kindergarten to primary and secondary schools) visit these labs with experienced guides.

OAR has organized three editions of “Cosmoscuola”, a series of Astronomy lessons and practical activities for children from 7 to 14 years of age. A certain number of OAR researchers have collaborated in organizing lessons on their scientific area of study.

OAR has organized – in particular in the years from 2011 to 2017 – 15 to 50 star-gazing nights per year, open to the public. These evenings, in which visitors could visit Astrolab, observe planets and the Moon at the MPT telescope, listen to an astronomer's lecture or take part in activities with their children (Astrokids) have attracted 1000 to 5000 visitor per year.

OAR has also organized a certain number of temporary exhibitions:

2014 Guarda che scoperta!

2015 Astronomi, GPS del passato

2016 Nidi di stelle. Scienza e Arte alla scoperta del cosmo. Opere di Enrico Benaglia

2017 Chrono-grafia. Copper engravings especially made by many artists for the event

Finally, OAR has organized, from 2012 to 2017, six editions of “Estate Sotto le Stelle” (Summer under the Styars), offering to the public a series of lectures, concerts, debates, exhibitions inside its “Parco Scientifico”.

Relationships with Universities

OAR maintains intense relationships with all three Universities of Roma, with which it signed agreements years ago. Several lecturers and researchers of the three Universities hold teaching assignments with OAR.

OAR Researchers hold lections for both Bachelor and master's degree courses at the Physics departments of La Sapienza (4) and Roma Tre (1).

OAR takes part in the Doctorate in Astronomy, Astrophysics and Space Science which represents a consortium between la Sapienza and Tor Vergata Universities.

Human Resources

OAR houses 40 researchers and technologists, 39 technicians, and administrative staff, all tenure track.

OAR houses 9 temporary researchers and technologists and manages 6 contracts for fixed-term researcher or technologist and 1 contract for a technicians at ASI SSDC.

OAR houses 2 Astrofit2

OAR houses 15 grant recipients and manages another 5 at ASI SSDC

Every year, OAR welcomes a dozen Masters-degree students, as well as 10 to 15 PhD students.

All in all, OAR houses about 130 people, including staff, post-doc and students.

== See also ==
- List of astronomical observatories
