= List of minor planets: 369001–370000 =

The following is a partial list of minor planets, running from minor-planet number 369001 through 370000, inclusive. The primary data for this and other partial lists is based on JPL's "Small-Body Orbital Elements" and data available from the Minor Planet Center. Critical list information is also provided by the MPC, unless otherwise specified from Lowell Observatory. A detailed description of the table's columns and additional sources are given on the main page including a complete list of every page in this series, and a statistical break-up on the dynamical classification of minor planets.

Also see the summary list of all named bodies in numerical and alphabetical order, and the corresponding naming citations for the number range of this particular list. New namings may only be added to this list after official publication, as the preannouncement of names is condemned by the Working Group for Small Bodies Nomenclature of the International Astronomical Union.

Near-Earth obj.	MBA (inner)	MBA (outer)	Centaur
Mars-crosser	MBA (middle)	Jupiter trojan	Trans-Neptunian obj.
Unclassified

== 369001–369100 ==
Designation			Discovery			Properties		Ref
Permanent	Provisional	Named after	Date	Site	Discoverer(s)	Category	Diam.	Ref
369001	2007 HP_{16}	—	April 16, 2007	Mount Lemmon	Mount Lemmon Survey	·	1.8 km	MPC · JPL
369002	2007 HC_{66}	—	April 22, 2007	Mount Lemmon	Mount Lemmon Survey	EOS	1.7 km	MPC · JPL
369003	2007 HP_{79}	—	April 23, 2007	Kitt Peak	Spacewatch	·	2.2 km	MPC · JPL
369004	2007 HG_{80}	—	April 24, 2007	Kitt Peak	Spacewatch	·	1.9 km	MPC · JPL
369005	2007 JE_{12}	—	May 7, 2007	Kitt Peak	Spacewatch	·	4.0 km	MPC · JPL
369006	2007 JD_{20}	—	May 10, 2007	Mount Lemmon	Mount Lemmon Survey	·	2.3 km	MPC · JPL
369007	2007 JU_{28}	—	May 10, 2007	Mount Lemmon	Mount Lemmon Survey	NEM	2.8 km	MPC · JPL
369008	2007 LO_{3}	—	June 8, 2007	Kitt Peak	Spacewatch	·	2.9 km	MPC · JPL
369009	2007 LF_{10}	—	June 9, 2007	Kitt Peak	Spacewatch	·	2.2 km	MPC · JPL
369010 Ira	2007 OK_{2}	Ira	July 18, 2007	Simeiz	V. Rumyantsev, V. Biryukov	·	3.9 km	MPC · JPL
369011	2007 PD_{6}	—	August 8, 2007	Socorro	LINEAR	·	4.7 km	MPC · JPL
369012	2007 PG_{29}	—	August 15, 2007	Bisei SG Center	BATTeRS	·	4.6 km	MPC · JPL
369013	2007 RT_{68}	—	September 10, 2007	Kitt Peak	Spacewatch	·	3.5 km	MPC · JPL
369014	2007 RP_{286}	—	September 4, 2007	Mount Lemmon	Mount Lemmon Survey	·	3.4 km	MPC · JPL
369015	2007 TY_{51}	—	October 4, 2007	Kitt Peak	Spacewatch	·	610 m	MPC · JPL
369016	2007 TA_{148}	—	October 7, 2007	Socorro	LINEAR	·	850 m	MPC · JPL
369017	2007 TC_{181}	—	October 8, 2007	Anderson Mesa	LONEOS	(1118)	4.9 km	MPC · JPL
369018	2007 TS_{181}	—	October 8, 2007	Anderson Mesa	LONEOS	CYB	4.3 km	MPC · JPL
369019	2007 TE_{198}	—	October 8, 2007	Kitt Peak	Spacewatch	NYS	1.2 km	MPC · JPL
369020	2007 TG_{359}	—	September 15, 2007	Kitt Peak	Spacewatch	·	690 m	MPC · JPL
369021	2007 TO_{362}	—	October 14, 2007	Mount Lemmon	Mount Lemmon Survey	3:2	5.5 km	MPC · JPL
369022	2007 TO_{397}	—	October 10, 2007	Catalina	CSS	·	1.0 km	MPC · JPL
369023	2007 TF_{404}	—	October 3, 2007	Kitt Peak	Spacewatch	·	800 m	MPC · JPL
369024	2007 VY_{211}	—	November 9, 2007	Kitt Peak	Spacewatch	·	820 m	MPC · JPL
369025	2007 VE_{267}	—	November 14, 2007	Bisei SG Center	BATTeRS	·	680 m	MPC · JPL
369026	2007 VB_{314}	—	November 1, 2007	Kitt Peak	Spacewatch	·	1.6 km	MPC · JPL
369027	2007 XC_{4}	—	November 4, 2007	Kitt Peak	Spacewatch	·	870 m	MPC · JPL
369028	2007 XN_{31}	—	December 15, 2007	Kitt Peak	Spacewatch	V	640 m	MPC · JPL
369029	2007 XC_{58}	—	November 12, 2007	Mount Lemmon	Mount Lemmon Survey	·	770 m	MPC · JPL
369030	2007 YN_{65}	—	December 18, 2007	Mount Lemmon	Mount Lemmon Survey	·	1.2 km	MPC · JPL
369031	2007 YK_{66}	—	December 30, 2007	Kitt Peak	Spacewatch	NYS	1.2 km	MPC · JPL
369032	2008 AW_{18}	—	October 2, 2006	Mount Lemmon	Mount Lemmon Survey	MAS	990 m	MPC · JPL
369033	2008 AO_{53}	—	January 11, 2008	Kitt Peak	Spacewatch	·	640 m	MPC · JPL
369034	2008 AH_{102}	—	January 13, 2008	Kitt Peak	Spacewatch	·	890 m	MPC · JPL
369035	2008 AR_{107}	—	December 30, 2007	Kitt Peak	Spacewatch	MAS	700 m	MPC · JPL
369036	2008 AC_{109}	—	November 11, 2007	Mount Lemmon	Mount Lemmon Survey	·	1.3 km	MPC · JPL
369037	2008 AA_{115}	—	January 11, 2008	Kitt Peak	Spacewatch	V	730 m	MPC · JPL
369038	2008 BE_{7}	—	October 19, 2003	Palomar	NEAT	·	790 m	MPC · JPL
369039	2008 BK_{15}	—	December 31, 2007	Mount Lemmon	Mount Lemmon Survey	·	1.2 km	MPC · JPL
369040	2008 BE_{22}	—	November 11, 2007	Mount Lemmon	Mount Lemmon Survey	·	1.4 km	MPC · JPL
369041	2008 BV_{22}	—	January 31, 2008	Mount Lemmon	Mount Lemmon Survey	·	1.0 km	MPC · JPL
369042	2008 CS_{17}	—	February 3, 2008	Kitt Peak	Spacewatch	·	690 m	MPC · JPL
369043	2008 CF_{20}	—	February 6, 2008	Anderson Mesa	LONEOS	·	1.2 km	MPC · JPL
369044	2008 CV_{27}	—	February 2, 2008	Kitt Peak	Spacewatch	·	710 m	MPC · JPL
369045	2008 CB_{29}	—	October 22, 2006	Mount Lemmon	Mount Lemmon Survey	KOR	1.6 km	MPC · JPL
369046	2008 CM_{32}	—	February 2, 2008	Kitt Peak	Spacewatch	·	1.3 km	MPC · JPL
369047	2008 CQ_{86}	—	February 7, 2008	Mount Lemmon	Mount Lemmon Survey	·	1.4 km	MPC · JPL
369048	2008 CJ_{91}	—	January 30, 2008	Mount Lemmon	Mount Lemmon Survey	·	1.1 km	MPC · JPL
369049	2008 CT_{121}	—	January 30, 2008	Catalina	CSS	·	1.6 km	MPC · JPL
369050	2008 CQ_{150}	—	February 2, 2008	Kitt Peak	Spacewatch	·	1.2 km	MPC · JPL
369051	2008 CQ_{183}	—	February 13, 2008	Catalina	CSS	V	910 m	MPC · JPL
369052	2008 CU_{184}	—	February 8, 2008	Siding Spring	SSS	·	2.6 km	MPC · JPL
369053	2008 CT_{194}	—	February 12, 2008	Mount Lemmon	Mount Lemmon Survey	PHO	1.1 km	MPC · JPL
369054	2008 CB_{197}	—	February 8, 2008	Kitt Peak	Spacewatch	V	660 m	MPC · JPL
369055	2008 CG_{204}	—	February 11, 2008	Mount Lemmon	Mount Lemmon Survey	·	1.0 km	MPC · JPL
369056	2008 CG_{210}	—	February 2, 2008	Kitt Peak	Spacewatch	·	1.6 km	MPC · JPL
369057	2008 DK_{5}	—	February 28, 2008	Catalina	CSS	APO · PHA	190 m	MPC · JPL
369058	2008 DP_{38}	—	February 27, 2008	Kitt Peak	Spacewatch	·	1.3 km	MPC · JPL
369059	2008 DC_{68}	—	February 29, 2008	Kitt Peak	Spacewatch	·	1.2 km	MPC · JPL
369060	2008 DW_{70}	—	February 28, 2008	Catalina	CSS	·	1.7 km	MPC · JPL
369061	2008 ER_{25}	—	March 4, 2008	Kitt Peak	Spacewatch	·	750 m	MPC · JPL
369062	2008 ER_{29}	—	March 4, 2008	Mount Lemmon	Mount Lemmon Survey	·	1.8 km	MPC · JPL
369063	2008 EX_{32}	—	March 1, 2008	Kitt Peak	Spacewatch	(194)	1.6 km	MPC · JPL
369064	2008 EY_{36}	—	March 4, 2008	Kitt Peak	Spacewatch	·	650 m	MPC · JPL
369065	2008 EO_{48}	—	March 5, 2008	Kitt Peak	Spacewatch	·	1.2 km	MPC · JPL
369066	2008 EA_{70}	—	March 4, 2008	Kitt Peak	Spacewatch	·	1.8 km	MPC · JPL
369067	2008 EW_{87}	—	March 10, 2008	Mount Lemmon	Mount Lemmon Survey	·	2.8 km	MPC · JPL
369068	2008 EL_{123}	—	March 9, 2008	Kitt Peak	Spacewatch	·	1.5 km	MPC · JPL
369069	2008 ET_{160}	—	March 1, 2008	Kitt Peak	Spacewatch	·	1.3 km	MPC · JPL
369070	2008 EB_{161}	—	March 5, 2008	Kitt Peak	Spacewatch	·	970 m	MPC · JPL
369071	2008 FU_{3}	—	October 6, 2005	Mount Lemmon	Mount Lemmon Survey	·	1.2 km	MPC · JPL
369072	2008 FN_{27}	—	March 27, 2008	Kitt Peak	Spacewatch	·	2.1 km	MPC · JPL
369073	2008 FO_{54}	—	March 28, 2008	Mount Lemmon	Mount Lemmon Survey	·	1.9 km	MPC · JPL
369074	2008 FT_{57}	—	February 28, 2008	Kitt Peak	Spacewatch	KON	2.1 km	MPC · JPL
369075	2008 FP_{63}	—	March 5, 2008	Mount Lemmon	Mount Lemmon Survey	PHO	1.1 km	MPC · JPL
369076	2008 FT_{72}	—	March 10, 2008	Kitt Peak	Spacewatch	·	1.4 km	MPC · JPL
369077	2008 FP_{81}	—	March 27, 2008	Mount Lemmon	Mount Lemmon Survey	PHO	1.2 km	MPC · JPL
369078	2008 FX_{96}	—	March 4, 2008	Mount Lemmon	Mount Lemmon Survey	MAR	1.3 km	MPC · JPL
369079	2008 FD_{100}	—	March 30, 2008	Kitt Peak	Spacewatch	JUN	980 m	MPC · JPL
369080	2008 FT_{100}	—	March 30, 2008	Kitt Peak	Spacewatch	·	2.3 km	MPC · JPL
369081	2008 FE_{105}	—	March 31, 2008	Kitt Peak	Spacewatch	BRG	1.4 km	MPC · JPL
369082	2008 FW_{111}	—	March 31, 2008	Kitt Peak	Spacewatch	·	2.0 km	MPC · JPL
369083	2008 FZ_{115}	—	March 31, 2008	Mount Lemmon	Mount Lemmon Survey	·	1.1 km	MPC · JPL
369084	2008 FJ_{136}	—	March 27, 2008	Mount Lemmon	Mount Lemmon Survey	·	2.2 km	MPC · JPL
369085	2008 GU_{21}	—	April 8, 2008	Desert Eagle	W. K. Y. Yeung	·	2.0 km	MPC · JPL
369086	2008 GJ_{32}	—	April 3, 2008	Kitt Peak	Spacewatch	·	1.1 km	MPC · JPL
369087	2008 GF_{44}	—	April 4, 2008	Kitt Peak	Spacewatch	·	1.4 km	MPC · JPL
369088 Marcus	2008 GG_{44}	Marcus	April 4, 2008	Kitt Peak	Spacewatch	·	1.2 km	MPC · JPL
369089	2008 GE_{65}	—	April 6, 2008	Kitt Peak	Spacewatch	·	1.8 km	MPC · JPL
369090	2008 GA_{70}	—	April 6, 2008	Mount Lemmon	Mount Lemmon Survey	·	3.2 km	MPC · JPL
369091	2008 GN_{88}	—	March 28, 2008	Mount Lemmon	Mount Lemmon Survey	·	1.2 km	MPC · JPL
369092	2008 GM_{91}	—	April 6, 2008	Mount Lemmon	Mount Lemmon Survey	JUN	1.2 km	MPC · JPL
369093	2008 GM_{101}	—	March 28, 2008	Kitt Peak	Spacewatch	·	1.3 km	MPC · JPL
369094	2008 GA_{118}	—	March 29, 2008	Kitt Peak	Spacewatch	·	1.6 km	MPC · JPL
369095	2008 GT_{122}	—	October 22, 2005	Catalina	CSS	EOS	2.1 km	MPC · JPL
369096	2008 GO_{123}	—	April 13, 2008	Kitt Peak	Spacewatch	JUN	1.1 km	MPC · JPL
369097	2008 GC_{124}	—	December 16, 2007	Mount Lemmon	Mount Lemmon Survey	·	1.2 km	MPC · JPL
369098	2008 GW_{131}	—	April 6, 2008	Kitt Peak	Spacewatch	EUN	1.2 km	MPC · JPL
369099	2008 GU_{136}	—	April 6, 2008	Kitt Peak	Spacewatch	·	1.6 km	MPC · JPL
369100	2008 GP_{144}	—	April 4, 2008	Mount Lemmon	Mount Lemmon Survey	·	2.1 km	MPC · JPL

== 369101–369200 ==
back to top

Designation			Discovery			Properties		Ref
Permanent	Provisional	Named after	Date	Site	Discoverer(s)	Category	Diam.	Ref
369101	2008 HA_{1}	—	April 24, 2008	Catalina	CSS	·	1.5 km	MPC · JPL
369102	2008 HW_{2}	—	April 15, 2008	Mount Lemmon	Mount Lemmon Survey	·	1.2 km	MPC · JPL
369103	2008 HS_{34}	—	April 27, 2008	Mount Lemmon	Mount Lemmon Survey	EUN	1.3 km	MPC · JPL
369104	2008 HN_{35}	—	April 28, 2008	Kitt Peak	Spacewatch	·	2.5 km	MPC · JPL
369105	2008 HP_{54}	—	April 29, 2008	Kitt Peak	Spacewatch	·	1.7 km	MPC · JPL
369106	2008 HA_{63}	—	March 28, 2008	Mount Lemmon	Mount Lemmon Survey	·	1.4 km	MPC · JPL
369107	2008 JH_{5}	—	May 3, 2008	Kitt Peak	Spacewatch	·	2.1 km	MPC · JPL
369108	2008 JT_{24}	—	May 3, 2008	Cerro Burek	Burek, Cerro	MAR	1.2 km	MPC · JPL
369109	2008 JF_{40}	—	May 3, 2008	Kitt Peak	Spacewatch	MAR	1.3 km	MPC · JPL
369110	2008 KV_{25}	—	October 8, 2005	Kitt Peak	Spacewatch	·	1.3 km	MPC · JPL
369111	2008 KP_{38}	—	May 30, 2008	Kitt Peak	Spacewatch	·	1.5 km	MPC · JPL
369112	2008 NS_{3}	—	July 6, 2008	Charleston	Astronomical Research Observatory	·	2.5 km	MPC · JPL
369113	2008 OC_{4}	—	July 26, 2008	Siding Spring	SSS	·	3.8 km	MPC · JPL
369114	2008 OZ_{20}	—	July 29, 2008	Kitt Peak	Spacewatch	·	1.5 km	MPC · JPL
369115	2008 OA_{24}	—	July 29, 2008	Kitt Peak	Spacewatch	KOR	1.5 km	MPC · JPL
369116	2008 PB_{17}	—	August 11, 2008	Sandlot	G. Hug	·	2.7 km	MPC · JPL
369117	2008 QJ_{6}	—	August 25, 2008	Dauban	Kugel, F.	EOS	4.0 km	MPC · JPL
369118	2008 QO_{10}	—	August 26, 2008	La Sagra	OAM	·	1.9 km	MPC · JPL
369119	2008 QC_{11}	—	August 26, 2008	La Sagra	OAM	·	5.0 km	MPC · JPL
369120	2008 QV_{33}	—	August 27, 2008	La Sagra	OAM	·	3.4 km	MPC · JPL
369121	2008 QS_{36}	—	August 21, 2008	Kitt Peak	Spacewatch	EOS	2.0 km	MPC · JPL
369122	2008 QM_{39}	—	August 24, 2008	Kitt Peak	Spacewatch	·	2.0 km	MPC · JPL
369123	2008 QH_{44}	—	August 29, 2008	La Sagra	OAM	·	3.5 km	MPC · JPL
369124	2008 RA_{4}	—	September 2, 2008	Kitt Peak	Spacewatch	EOS	1.9 km	MPC · JPL
369125	2008 RY_{4}	—	September 2, 2008	Kitt Peak	Spacewatch	EOS	1.9 km	MPC · JPL
369126	2008 RP_{6}	—	September 3, 2008	Kitt Peak	Spacewatch	·	3.9 km	MPC · JPL
369127	2008 RX_{6}	—	September 3, 2008	Kitt Peak	Spacewatch	·	2.9 km	MPC · JPL
369128	2008 RW_{11}	—	August 23, 2008	Kitt Peak	Spacewatch	·	2.9 km	MPC · JPL
369129	2008 RS_{15}	—	May 2, 2006	Mount Lemmon	Mount Lemmon Survey	·	3.4 km	MPC · JPL
369130	2008 RP_{28}	—	September 2, 2008	Kitt Peak	Spacewatch	·	1.7 km	MPC · JPL
369131	2008 RS_{29}	—	September 2, 2008	Kitt Peak	Spacewatch	·	2.8 km	MPC · JPL
369132	2008 RB_{34}	—	August 22, 2008	Kitt Peak	Spacewatch	·	2.5 km	MPC · JPL
369133	2008 RB_{49}	—	July 29, 2008	Mount Lemmon	Mount Lemmon Survey	·	3.2 km	MPC · JPL
369134 Mariareiche	2008 RG_{79}	Mariareiche	September 8, 2008	Taunus	E. Schwab, Zimmer, U.	·	1.7 km	MPC · JPL
369135	2008 RU_{83}	—	September 4, 2008	Kitt Peak	Spacewatch	·	1.3 km	MPC · JPL
369136	2008 RC_{86}	—	September 5, 2008	Kitt Peak	Spacewatch	·	3.3 km	MPC · JPL
369137	2008 RE_{88}	—	September 5, 2008	Kitt Peak	Spacewatch	·	4.0 km	MPC · JPL
369138	2008 RJ_{92}	—	September 6, 2008	Kitt Peak	Spacewatch	·	3.3 km	MPC · JPL
369139	2008 RB_{110}	—	September 3, 2008	Kitt Peak	Spacewatch	·	2.4 km	MPC · JPL
369140	2008 RG_{119}	—	September 4, 2008	Kitt Peak	Spacewatch	VER	2.6 km	MPC · JPL
369141	2008 RL_{131}	—	August 19, 2002	Palomar	NEAT	·	4.7 km	MPC · JPL
369142	2008 RN_{135}	—	September 3, 2008	Kitt Peak	Spacewatch	EOS	1.8 km	MPC · JPL
369143	2008 RA_{136}	—	September 4, 2008	Socorro	LINEAR	·	4.3 km	MPC · JPL
369144	2008 RY_{136}	—	September 4, 2008	Kitt Peak	Spacewatch	·	1.8 km	MPC · JPL
369145	2008 RH_{137}	—	September 5, 2008	Socorro	LINEAR	·	2.4 km	MPC · JPL
369146	2008 RK_{139}	—	October 27, 2003	Kitt Peak	Spacewatch	EOS	2.4 km	MPC · JPL
369147	2008 RA_{142}	—	September 4, 2008	Socorro	LINEAR	NAE	3.4 km	MPC · JPL
369148	2008 RU_{142}	—	September 2, 2008	Kitt Peak	Spacewatch	TIR	2.4 km	MPC · JPL
369149	2008 SX_{32}	—	September 20, 2008	Kitt Peak	Spacewatch	·	3.1 km	MPC · JPL
369150	2008 SF_{42}	—	September 20, 2008	Kitt Peak	Spacewatch	·	3.5 km	MPC · JPL
369151	2008 SK_{44}	—	September 20, 2008	Kitt Peak	Spacewatch	·	3.2 km	MPC · JPL
369152	2008 SJ_{52}	—	September 20, 2008	Mount Lemmon	Mount Lemmon Survey	·	3.0 km	MPC · JPL
369153	2008 SM_{52}	—	September 20, 2008	Mount Lemmon	Mount Lemmon Survey	·	4.0 km	MPC · JPL
369154	2008 SQ_{60}	—	September 20, 2008	Catalina	CSS	·	2.1 km	MPC · JPL
369155	2008 SB_{62}	—	September 21, 2008	Kitt Peak	Spacewatch	·	2.5 km	MPC · JPL
369156	2008 SU_{63}	—	September 6, 2008	Mount Lemmon	Mount Lemmon Survey	EOS	1.9 km	MPC · JPL
369157	2008 SF_{64}	—	September 21, 2008	Kitt Peak	Spacewatch	·	3.7 km	MPC · JPL
369158	2008 SB_{78}	—	September 3, 2008	Kitt Peak	Spacewatch	·	3.8 km	MPC · JPL
369159	2008 SC_{86}	—	September 20, 2008	Kitt Peak	Spacewatch	·	3.0 km	MPC · JPL
369160	2008 SM_{93}	—	September 21, 2008	Kitt Peak	Spacewatch	·	2.3 km	MPC · JPL
369161	2008 SH_{96}	—	September 21, 2008	Kitt Peak	Spacewatch	·	3.2 km	MPC · JPL
369162	2008 SV_{97}	—	September 21, 2008	Kitt Peak	Spacewatch	·	2.7 km	MPC · JPL
369163	2008 SW_{99}	—	September 21, 2008	Kitt Peak	Spacewatch	·	2.3 km	MPC · JPL
369164	2008 SV_{109}	—	September 22, 2008	Kitt Peak	Spacewatch	KOR	1.7 km	MPC · JPL
369165	2008 SW_{109}	—	September 22, 2008	Kitt Peak	Spacewatch	·	2.5 km	MPC · JPL
369166	2008 ST_{110}	—	September 22, 2008	Kitt Peak	Spacewatch	THM	2.3 km	MPC · JPL
369167	2008 SU_{110}	—	September 22, 2008	Kitt Peak	Spacewatch	EOS	2.1 km	MPC · JPL
369168	2008 SC_{115}	—	September 22, 2008	Kitt Peak	Spacewatch	·	2.7 km	MPC · JPL
369169	2008 SW_{128}	—	September 22, 2008	Kitt Peak	Spacewatch	·	3.2 km	MPC · JPL
369170	2008 SH_{132}	—	September 22, 2008	Kitt Peak	Spacewatch	·	2.6 km	MPC · JPL
369171	2008 SD_{140}	—	September 24, 2008	Kitt Peak	Spacewatch	·	2.5 km	MPC · JPL
369172	2008 SY_{140}	—	September 24, 2008	Mount Lemmon	Mount Lemmon Survey	EOS	2.0 km	MPC · JPL
369173	2008 SC_{146}	—	September 23, 2008	Kitt Peak	Spacewatch	·	3.6 km	MPC · JPL
369174	2008 SG_{149}	—	September 23, 2008	Kitt Peak	Spacewatch	·	2.7 km	MPC · JPL
369175	2008 SS_{163}	—	September 28, 2008	Socorro	LINEAR	·	2.9 km	MPC · JPL
369176	2008 SP_{170}	—	September 21, 2008	Mount Lemmon	Mount Lemmon Survey	·	2.3 km	MPC · JPL
369177	2008 SE_{171}	—	September 21, 2008	Mount Lemmon	Mount Lemmon Survey	·	3.3 km	MPC · JPL
369178	2008 SN_{173}	—	September 22, 2008	Catalina	CSS	·	4.6 km	MPC · JPL
369179	2008 SB_{176}	—	September 23, 2008	Kitt Peak	Spacewatch	·	3.9 km	MPC · JPL
369180	2008 SG_{196}	—	September 25, 2008	Kitt Peak	Spacewatch	VER	2.7 km	MPC · JPL
369181	2008 SO_{205}	—	September 26, 2008	Kitt Peak	Spacewatch	·	2.6 km	MPC · JPL
369182	2008 SK_{208}	—	September 27, 2008	Mount Lemmon	Mount Lemmon Survey	·	2.8 km	MPC · JPL
369183	2008 SH_{218}	—	September 30, 2008	La Sagra	OAM	LIX	4.1 km	MPC · JPL
369184	2008 SO_{234}	—	October 23, 2003	Kitt Peak	Spacewatch	·	2.0 km	MPC · JPL
369185	2008 SP_{235}	—	September 28, 2008	Catalina	CSS	·	3.4 km	MPC · JPL
369186	2008 SD_{259}	—	September 23, 2008	Kitt Peak	Spacewatch	·	2.9 km	MPC · JPL
369187	2008 SX_{268}	—	September 30, 2008	Catalina	CSS	·	3.0 km	MPC · JPL
369188	2008 SQ_{283}	—	September 23, 2008	Catalina	CSS	·	6.8 km	MPC · JPL
369189	2008 SP_{285}	—	September 21, 2008	Kitt Peak	Spacewatch	HYG	3.0 km	MPC · JPL
369190	2008 TH_{11}	—	September 19, 2003	Kitt Peak	Spacewatch	·	2.2 km	MPC · JPL
369191	2008 TY_{16}	—	October 1, 2008	Mount Lemmon	Mount Lemmon Survey	·	3.7 km	MPC · JPL
369192	2008 TO_{32}	—	October 1, 2008	Kitt Peak	Spacewatch	·	3.5 km	MPC · JPL
369193	2008 TS_{53}	—	September 20, 2008	Kitt Peak	Spacewatch	·	2.6 km	MPC · JPL
369194	2008 TV_{60}	—	October 2, 2008	Kitt Peak	Spacewatch	·	5.0 km	MPC · JPL
369195	2008 TE_{62}	—	October 2, 2008	Kitt Peak	Spacewatch	·	2.2 km	MPC · JPL
369196	2008 TU_{64}	—	October 2, 2008	Catalina	CSS	·	4.9 km	MPC · JPL
369197	2008 TD_{65}	—	October 2, 2008	Catalina	CSS	·	2.7 km	MPC · JPL
369198	2008 TD_{94}	—	October 5, 2008	La Sagra	OAM	·	2.8 km	MPC · JPL
369199	2008 TN_{105}	—	October 6, 2008	Kitt Peak	Spacewatch	·	2.5 km	MPC · JPL
369200	2008 TU_{105}	—	October 6, 2008	Kitt Peak	Spacewatch	·	2.6 km	MPC · JPL

== 369201–369300 ==
back to top

Designation			Discovery			Properties		Ref
Permanent	Provisional	Named after	Date	Site	Discoverer(s)	Category	Diam.	Ref
369201	2008 TF_{116}	—	October 6, 2008	Catalina	CSS	·	3.9 km	MPC · JPL
369202	2008 TA_{135}	—	October 8, 2008	Kitt Peak	Spacewatch	·	2.9 km	MPC · JPL
369203	2008 TT_{152}	—	March 20, 2001	Kitt Peak	Spacewatch	·	2.4 km	MPC · JPL
369204	2008 TU_{153}	—	October 9, 2008	Mount Lemmon	Mount Lemmon Survey	·	2.9 km	MPC · JPL
369205	2008 TJ_{160}	—	October 1, 2008	Mount Lemmon	Mount Lemmon Survey	·	2.5 km	MPC · JPL
369206	2008 TY_{165}	—	October 6, 2008	Catalina	CSS	·	4.6 km	MPC · JPL
369207	2008 TO_{173}	—	October 6, 2008	Catalina	CSS	EOS	2.4 km	MPC · JPL
369208	2008 TS_{180}	—	October 2, 2008	Catalina	CSS	·	2.3 km	MPC · JPL
369209	2008 TE_{188}	—	October 9, 2008	Socorro	LINEAR	TIR	3.3 km	MPC · JPL
369210	2008 UL_{10}	—	October 8, 2008	Mount Lemmon	Mount Lemmon Survey	·	2.6 km	MPC · JPL
369211	2008 UR_{10}	—	October 17, 2008	Kitt Peak	Spacewatch	·	2.2 km	MPC · JPL
369212	2008 UD_{12}	—	October 17, 2008	Kitt Peak	Spacewatch	·	2.6 km	MPC · JPL
369213	2008 UL_{22}	—	October 19, 2008	Kitt Peak	Spacewatch	·	3.4 km	MPC · JPL
369214	2008 UJ_{39}	—	October 20, 2008	Mount Lemmon	Mount Lemmon Survey	·	3.7 km	MPC · JPL
369215	2008 US_{63}	—	October 21, 2008	Mount Lemmon	Mount Lemmon Survey	·	2.8 km	MPC · JPL
369216	2008 UH_{70}	—	October 21, 2008	Kitt Peak	Spacewatch	·	2.5 km	MPC · JPL
369217	2008 UH_{75}	—	October 21, 2008	Kitt Peak	Spacewatch	·	3.0 km	MPC · JPL
369218	2008 UP_{80}	—	October 22, 2008	Kitt Peak	Spacewatch	VER	3.5 km	MPC · JPL
369219	2008 UY_{92}	—	October 8, 2008	Catalina	CSS	·	3.2 km	MPC · JPL
369220	2008 UC_{101}	—	October 20, 2008	Kitt Peak	Spacewatch	·	3.0 km	MPC · JPL
369221	2008 UT_{106}	—	October 21, 2008	Kitt Peak	Spacewatch	·	3.5 km	MPC · JPL
369222	2008 UO_{117}	—	October 22, 2008	Kitt Peak	Spacewatch	HYG	3.2 km	MPC · JPL
369223	2008 UL_{119}	—	October 22, 2008	Kitt Peak	Spacewatch	HYG	3.1 km	MPC · JPL
369224	2008 UP_{151}	—	October 23, 2008	Kitt Peak	Spacewatch	·	3.2 km	MPC · JPL
369225	2008 UX_{156}	—	October 23, 2008	Mount Lemmon	Mount Lemmon Survey	·	2.0 km	MPC · JPL
369226	2008 UW_{160}	—	October 23, 2008	Črni Vrh	Mikuž, B.	·	5.8 km	MPC · JPL
369227	2008 UF_{209}	—	October 23, 2008	Kitt Peak	Spacewatch	·	3.3 km	MPC · JPL
369228	2008 UU_{213}	—	October 24, 2008	Catalina	CSS	·	3.1 km	MPC · JPL
369229	2008 UD_{226}	—	October 25, 2008	Catalina	CSS	·	4.7 km	MPC · JPL
369230	2008 UL_{259}	—	October 27, 2008	Mount Lemmon	Mount Lemmon Survey	·	3.4 km	MPC · JPL
369231	2008 UB_{276}	—	May 6, 2006	Mount Lemmon	Mount Lemmon Survey	CYB	3.6 km	MPC · JPL
369232	2008 UJ_{278}	—	October 28, 2008	Mount Lemmon	Mount Lemmon Survey	·	2.2 km	MPC · JPL
369233	2008 UK_{309}	—	October 30, 2008	Catalina	CSS	·	2.4 km	MPC · JPL
369234	2008 UD_{322}	—	October 31, 2008	Mount Lemmon	Mount Lemmon Survey	·	2.6 km	MPC · JPL
369235	2008 UB_{354}	—	October 23, 2008	Kitt Peak	Spacewatch	THM	2.5 km	MPC · JPL
369236	2008 UR_{362}	—	December 4, 2003	Socorro	LINEAR	·	3.2 km	MPC · JPL
369237	2008 UV_{369}	—	October 30, 2008	Catalina	CSS	T_{j} (2.99)	7.5 km	MPC · JPL
369238	2008 VN_{1}	—	November 2, 2008	Socorro	LINEAR	LIX	5.0 km	MPC · JPL
369239	2008 VO_{16}	—	November 1, 2008	Kitt Peak	Spacewatch	·	4.3 km	MPC · JPL
369240	2008 WK_{12}	—	November 18, 2008	Catalina	CSS	LIX	4.3 km	MPC · JPL
369241	2008 WU_{24}	—	November 18, 2008	Catalina	CSS	·	3.3 km	MPC · JPL
369242	2008 WH_{69}	—	November 18, 2008	Catalina	CSS	·	4.3 km	MPC · JPL
369243	2008 WJ_{69}	—	November 18, 2008	Kitt Peak	Spacewatch	·	3.3 km	MPC · JPL
369244	2008 WY_{92}	—	November 25, 2008	Dauban	Kugel, F.	·	6.8 km	MPC · JPL
369245	2008 WQ_{94}	—	November 29, 2008	Mayhill	Lowe, A.	·	2.8 km	MPC · JPL
369246	2008 XJ_{51}	—	December 4, 2008	Socorro	LINEAR	·	3.8 km	MPC · JPL
369247	2008 YM_{46}	—	December 29, 2008	Mount Lemmon	Mount Lemmon Survey	·	1.0 km	MPC · JPL
369248	2009 DA_{4}	—	February 13, 2009	Kitt Peak	Spacewatch	·	1.0 km	MPC · JPL
369249	2009 DC_{4}	—	February 1, 2009	Catalina	CSS	·	1.7 km	MPC · JPL
369250	2009 DK_{30}	—	May 2, 2006	Mount Lemmon	Mount Lemmon Survey	·	480 m	MPC · JPL
369251	2009 DF_{137}	—	February 27, 2009	Catalina	CSS	H	700 m	MPC · JPL
369252	2009 DB_{142}	—	January 2, 2009	Kitt Peak	Spacewatch	·	810 m	MPC · JPL
369253	2009 ED_{31}	—	March 3, 2009	Mount Lemmon	Mount Lemmon Survey	·	530 m	MPC · JPL
369254	2009 FB_{22}	—	March 18, 2009	Kitt Peak	Spacewatch	·	730 m	MPC · JPL
369255	2009 FP_{50}	—	March 28, 2009	Kitt Peak	Spacewatch	·	700 m	MPC · JPL
369256	2009 HH_{42}	—	April 20, 2009	Kitt Peak	Spacewatch	·	740 m	MPC · JPL
369257	2009 HY_{96}	—	April 23, 2009	Catalina	CSS	PHO	1.1 km	MPC · JPL
369258	2009 HV_{100}	—	April 27, 2009	Mount Lemmon	Mount Lemmon Survey	·	1.8 km	MPC · JPL
369259	2009 JF_{7}	—	April 30, 2009	Kitt Peak	Spacewatch	·	2.0 km	MPC · JPL
369260	2009 JW_{17}	—	May 4, 2009	Mount Lemmon	Mount Lemmon Survey	·	1.0 km	MPC · JPL
369261	2009 KB_{2}	—	May 16, 2009	La Sagra	OAM	·	1.1 km	MPC · JPL
369262	2009 KO_{5}	—	March 19, 2009	Mount Lemmon	Mount Lemmon Survey	·	1.0 km	MPC · JPL
369263	2009 LE_{4}	—	June 12, 2009	Kitt Peak	Spacewatch	V	700 m	MPC · JPL
369264	2009 MS	—	June 19, 2009	Mount Lemmon	Mount Lemmon Survey	APO +1km · PHA	1.5 km	MPC · JPL
369265	2009 MN_{1}	—	June 22, 2009	Skylive	Tozzi, F.	·	3.7 km	MPC · JPL
369266	2009 MG_{3}	—	August 21, 2006	Kitt Peak	Spacewatch	·	1.3 km	MPC · JPL
369267	2009 OE_{15}	—	July 29, 2009	Tiki	Teamo, N.	·	1.0 km	MPC · JPL
369268	2009 OA_{23}	—	July 21, 2009	La Sagra	OAM	·	1.7 km	MPC · JPL
369269	2009 PG_{3}	—	August 12, 2009	La Sagra	OAM	ADE	2.0 km	MPC · JPL
369270	2009 PZ_{15}	—	August 15, 2009	Kitt Peak	Spacewatch	·	1.4 km	MPC · JPL
369271	2009 QU_{5}	—	August 16, 2009	Bergisch Gladbach	W. Bickel	·	1.2 km	MPC · JPL
369272	2009 QA_{7}	—	August 17, 2009	Goodricke-Pigott	R. A. Tucker	·	1.1 km	MPC · JPL
369273	2009 QO_{7}	—	August 18, 2009	Črni Vrh	Matičič, S.	·	1.4 km	MPC · JPL
369274	2009 QD_{10}	—	August 21, 2009	Andrushivka	Andrushivka	(194)	1.5 km	MPC · JPL
369275	2009 QX_{13}	—	August 16, 2009	Kitt Peak	Spacewatch	·	2.5 km	MPC · JPL
369276	2009 QY_{13}	—	August 16, 2009	Kitt Peak	Spacewatch	·	2.0 km	MPC · JPL
369277	2009 QG_{14}	—	August 16, 2009	Kitt Peak	Spacewatch	·	1.5 km	MPC · JPL
369278	2009 QK_{36}	—	August 28, 2009	La Sagra	OAM	·	2.1 km	MPC · JPL
369279	2009 QN_{38}	—	August 30, 2009	Taunus	Karge, S., R. Kling	·	1.7 km	MPC · JPL
369280	2009 QJ_{49}	—	January 27, 2007	Mount Lemmon	Mount Lemmon Survey	WIT	1.1 km	MPC · JPL
369281	2009 QF_{51}	—	August 27, 2009	Kitt Peak	Spacewatch	·	1.5 km	MPC · JPL
369282	2009 QU_{57}	—	August 27, 2009	Črni Vrh	Vales, J.	·	1.7 km	MPC · JPL
369283	2009 RT_{25}	—	September 15, 2009	Kitt Peak	Spacewatch	·	2.4 km	MPC · JPL
369284	2009 RQ_{26}	—	September 13, 2009	ESA OGS	ESA OGS	·	1.3 km	MPC · JPL
369285	2009 RA_{28}	—	September 14, 2009	Kitt Peak	Spacewatch	·	2.0 km	MPC · JPL
369286	2009 RL_{29}	—	September 14, 2009	Kitt Peak	Spacewatch	WIT	1.2 km	MPC · JPL
369287	2009 RV_{34}	—	September 14, 2009	Kitt Peak	Spacewatch	·	2.4 km	MPC · JPL
369288	2009 RR_{43}	—	October 22, 2005	Kitt Peak	Spacewatch	·	1.8 km	MPC · JPL
369289	2009 RT_{46}	—	September 15, 2009	Kitt Peak	Spacewatch	·	1.7 km	MPC · JPL
369290	2009 RY_{55}	—	September 15, 2009	Kitt Peak	Spacewatch	·	1.9 km	MPC · JPL
369291	2009 RB_{61}	—	September 14, 2009	Catalina	CSS	·	1.8 km	MPC · JPL
369292	2009 RC_{61}	—	September 14, 2009	Catalina	CSS	·	2.3 km	MPC · JPL
369293	2009 RN_{71}	—	September 15, 2009	Kitt Peak	Spacewatch	·	1.8 km	MPC · JPL
369294	2009 RA_{76}	—	September 14, 2009	Kitt Peak	Spacewatch	·	1.4 km	MPC · JPL
369295	2009 SH_{18}	—	September 21, 2009	Catalina	CSS	·	970 m	MPC · JPL
369296	2009 SU_{19}	—	September 18, 2009	Mount Lemmon	Mount Lemmon Survey	APO +1km	860 m	MPC · JPL
369297 Nazca	2009 SW_{20}	Nazca	September 23, 2009	Taunus	Karge, S., E. Schwab	·	1.5 km	MPC · JPL
369298	2009 SZ_{25}	—	September 16, 2009	Kitt Peak	Spacewatch	·	1.3 km	MPC · JPL
369299	2009 SR_{26}	—	September 16, 2009	Kitt Peak	Spacewatch	·	1.5 km	MPC · JPL
369300	2009 SU_{34}	—	September 16, 2009	Kitt Peak	Spacewatch	·	1.8 km	MPC · JPL

== 369301–369400 ==
back to top

Designation			Discovery			Properties		Ref
Permanent	Provisional	Named after	Date	Site	Discoverer(s)	Category	Diam.	Ref
369301	2009 SK_{37}	—	September 16, 2009	Kitt Peak	Spacewatch	·	1.9 km	MPC · JPL
369302	2009 SY_{38}	—	November 1, 2000	Kitt Peak	Spacewatch	·	1.5 km	MPC · JPL
369303	2009 SE_{39}	—	September 16, 2009	Kitt Peak	Spacewatch	·	1.9 km	MPC · JPL
369304	2009 SM_{45}	—	September 16, 2009	Kitt Peak	Spacewatch	·	1.8 km	MPC · JPL
369305	2009 SO_{45}	—	September 16, 2009	Kitt Peak	Spacewatch	·	1.7 km	MPC · JPL
369306	2009 SS_{45}	—	September 16, 2009	Kitt Peak	Spacewatch	HOF	2.2 km	MPC · JPL
369307	2009 SL_{46}	—	September 16, 2009	Kitt Peak	Spacewatch	·	2.0 km	MPC · JPL
369308	2009 SQ_{48}	—	September 16, 2009	Kitt Peak	Spacewatch	·	1.3 km	MPC · JPL
369309	2009 SZ_{60}	—	September 17, 2009	Kitt Peak	Spacewatch	·	2.2 km	MPC · JPL
369310	2009 SB_{67}	—	September 17, 2009	Kitt Peak	Spacewatch	DOR	2.2 km	MPC · JPL
369311	2009 SS_{75}	—	September 17, 2009	Kitt Peak	Spacewatch	·	1.6 km	MPC · JPL
369312	2009 SA_{81}	—	September 18, 2009	Mount Lemmon	Mount Lemmon Survey	·	910 m	MPC · JPL
369313	2009 SV_{92}	—	September 18, 2009	Purple Mountain	PMO NEO Survey Program	·	1.2 km	MPC · JPL
369314	2009 SL_{101}	—	September 18, 2009	Catalina	CSS	·	2.0 km	MPC · JPL
369315	2009 SR_{102}	—	September 23, 2009	Taunus	Karge, S., R. Kling	·	1.5 km	MPC · JPL
369316	2009 SU_{103}	—	November 6, 2005	Mount Lemmon	Mount Lemmon Survey	·	1.4 km	MPC · JPL
369317	2009 ST_{113}	—	September 18, 2009	Kitt Peak	Spacewatch	·	1.9 km	MPC · JPL
369318	2009 SS_{118}	—	September 18, 2009	Kitt Peak	Spacewatch	(5)	1.4 km	MPC · JPL
369319	2009 ST_{118}	—	September 18, 2009	Kitt Peak	Spacewatch	·	1.6 km	MPC · JPL
369320	2009 SM_{136}	—	September 18, 2009	Kitt Peak	Spacewatch	·	1.3 km	MPC · JPL
369321	2009 SH_{138}	—	September 18, 2009	Kitt Peak	Spacewatch	·	1.4 km	MPC · JPL
369322	2009 SB_{140}	—	September 19, 2009	Kitt Peak	Spacewatch	·	3.1 km	MPC · JPL
369323	2009 SY_{140}	—	September 19, 2009	Kitt Peak	Spacewatch	·	1.9 km	MPC · JPL
369324	2009 SE_{142}	—	September 19, 2009	Kitt Peak	Spacewatch	·	1.4 km	MPC · JPL
369325	2009 SW_{183}	—	September 21, 2009	Kitt Peak	Spacewatch	·	2.1 km	MPC · JPL
369326	2009 SW_{201}	—	September 22, 2009	Kitt Peak	Spacewatch	·	1.3 km	MPC · JPL
369327	2009 SD_{244}	—	September 16, 2009	Kitt Peak	Spacewatch	·	4.1 km	MPC · JPL
369328	2009 SD_{249}	—	September 17, 2009	La Sagra	OAM	EUN	1.8 km	MPC · JPL
369329	2009 SH_{253}	—	September 23, 2009	Kitt Peak	Spacewatch	·	1.8 km	MPC · JPL
369330	2009 SM_{257}	—	August 15, 2009	Catalina	CSS	EUN	1.3 km	MPC · JPL
369331	2009 SN_{257}	—	October 23, 2005	Catalina	CSS	BRG	1.7 km	MPC · JPL
369332	2009 SQ_{257}	—	September 21, 2009	Catalina	CSS	EUN	1.2 km	MPC · JPL
369333	2009 SO_{258}	—	November 30, 2005	Kitt Peak	Spacewatch	·	1.5 km	MPC · JPL
369334	2009 SW_{269}	—	September 24, 2009	Kitt Peak	Spacewatch	·	1.3 km	MPC · JPL
369335	2009 SS_{279}	—	December 25, 2005	Kitt Peak	Spacewatch	·	2.0 km	MPC · JPL
369336	2009 SN_{284}	—	September 25, 2009	Catalina	CSS	·	1.7 km	MPC · JPL
369337	2009 SW_{292}	—	September 26, 2009	Kitt Peak	Spacewatch	·	1.8 km	MPC · JPL
369338	2009 SJ_{319}	—	September 20, 2009	Kitt Peak	Spacewatch	HOF	2.2 km	MPC · JPL
369339	2009 SD_{321}	—	July 30, 2009	Catalina	CSS	·	2.1 km	MPC · JPL
369340	2009 SY_{322}	—	September 22, 2009	Mount Lemmon	Mount Lemmon Survey	·	1.4 km	MPC · JPL
369341	2009 SC_{326}	—	September 27, 2009	Mount Lemmon	Mount Lemmon Survey	·	1.8 km	MPC · JPL
369342	2009 SX_{331}	—	September 20, 2009	Catalina	CSS	·	2.1 km	MPC · JPL
369343	2009 SN_{332}	—	September 21, 2009	Catalina	CSS	·	2.1 km	MPC · JPL
369344	2009 SU_{333}	—	September 16, 2009	Catalina	CSS	JUN	970 m	MPC · JPL
369345	2009 SQ_{334}	—	September 25, 2009	Catalina	CSS	EUN	1.8 km	MPC · JPL
369346	2009 SO_{337}	—	September 28, 2009	Catalina	CSS	·	1.9 km	MPC · JPL
369347	2009 SG_{340}	—	September 20, 2009	Kitt Peak	Spacewatch	·	1.6 km	MPC · JPL
369348	2009 SJ_{340}	—	September 20, 2009	Kitt Peak	Spacewatch	RAF	820 m	MPC · JPL
369349	2009 SV_{344}	—	September 18, 2009	Kitt Peak	Spacewatch	JUN	870 m	MPC · JPL
369350	2009 SK_{350}	—	September 23, 2009	Kitt Peak	Spacewatch	·	1.8 km	MPC · JPL
369351	2009 SM_{352}	—	September 16, 2009	Mount Lemmon	Mount Lemmon Survey	AGN	1.3 km	MPC · JPL
369352	2009 SY_{352}	—	September 16, 2009	Kitt Peak	Spacewatch	·	3.5 km	MPC · JPL
369353	2009 TU_{12}	—	October 11, 2009	Dauban	Kugel, F.	(5)	1.1 km	MPC · JPL
369354	2009 TN_{26}	—	October 14, 2009	La Sagra	OAM	·	1.4 km	MPC · JPL
369355	2009 TT_{27}	—	October 15, 2009	La Sagra	OAM	·	1.4 km	MPC · JPL
369356	2009 TP_{29}	—	October 15, 2009	Mount Lemmon	Mount Lemmon Survey	DOR	2.2 km	MPC · JPL
369357	2009 TC_{35}	—	October 14, 2009	La Sagra	OAM	·	1.2 km	MPC · JPL
369358	2009 TW_{37}	—	October 13, 2009	La Sagra	OAM	·	2.1 km	MPC · JPL
369359	2009 UE_{6}	—	October 16, 2009	Mount Lemmon	Mount Lemmon Survey	·	1.6 km	MPC · JPL
369360	2009 UC_{9}	—	October 16, 2009	Mount Lemmon	Mount Lemmon Survey	·	2.2 km	MPC · JPL
369361	2009 UR_{11}	—	October 16, 2009	Mount Lemmon	Mount Lemmon Survey	(5)	1.3 km	MPC · JPL
369362	2009 UW_{20}	—	October 22, 2009	Bisei SG Center	BATTeRS	·	1.2 km	MPC · JPL
369363	2009 UC_{27}	—	September 22, 2009	Mount Lemmon	Mount Lemmon Survey	·	2.7 km	MPC · JPL
369364	2009 UW_{32}	—	October 18, 2009	Mount Lemmon	Mount Lemmon Survey	·	1.5 km	MPC · JPL
369365	2009 US_{33}	—	October 18, 2009	Mount Lemmon	Mount Lemmon Survey	·	1.9 km	MPC · JPL
369366	2009 UU_{33}	—	September 19, 2009	Mount Lemmon	Mount Lemmon Survey	EOS	1.8 km	MPC · JPL
369367	2009 UQ_{39}	—	October 22, 2009	Catalina	CSS	·	1.7 km	MPC · JPL
369368	2009 UU_{53}	—	October 23, 2009	Mount Lemmon	Mount Lemmon Survey	·	970 m	MPC · JPL
369369	2009 UD_{57}	—	October 14, 2009	Catalina	CSS	·	2.8 km	MPC · JPL
369370	2009 UP_{94}	—	October 21, 2009	Catalina	CSS	WIT	950 m	MPC · JPL
369371	2009 UW_{107}	—	October 23, 2009	Kitt Peak	Spacewatch	·	1.6 km	MPC · JPL
369372	2009 UT_{109}	—	October 23, 2009	Mount Lemmon	Mount Lemmon Survey	AGN	1.3 km	MPC · JPL
369373	2009 UK_{116}	—	September 10, 2004	Socorro	LINEAR	·	1.8 km	MPC · JPL
369374	2009 UP_{117}	—	September 17, 2009	Mount Lemmon	Mount Lemmon Survey	·	2.0 km	MPC · JPL
369375	2009 UH_{132}	—	October 16, 2009	Catalina	CSS	·	3.1 km	MPC · JPL
369376	2009 UB_{137}	—	October 27, 2009	La Sagra	OAM	JUN	1.0 km	MPC · JPL
369377	2009 UE_{139}	—	October 27, 2009	Mount Lemmon	Mount Lemmon Survey	DOR	2.9 km	MPC · JPL
369378	2009 UM_{140}	—	October 23, 2009	Mount Lemmon	Mount Lemmon Survey	·	3.2 km	MPC · JPL
369379	2009 UF_{143}	—	October 18, 2009	Mount Lemmon	Mount Lemmon Survey	AST	1.6 km	MPC · JPL
369380	2009 UD_{146}	—	October 28, 2009	La Sagra	OAM	·	1.5 km	MPC · JPL
369381	2009 UX_{149}	—	October 26, 2009	Mount Lemmon	Mount Lemmon Survey	TIR	3.9 km	MPC · JPL
369382	2009 UX_{151}	—	October 18, 2009	Socorro	LINEAR	ADE	2.4 km	MPC · JPL
369383	2009 US_{152}	—	October 17, 2009	Catalina	CSS	·	2.5 km	MPC · JPL
369384	2009 UD_{154}	—	October 26, 2009	Kitt Peak	Spacewatch	·	2.1 km	MPC · JPL
369385	2009 UW_{154}	—	October 23, 2009	Mount Lemmon	Mount Lemmon Survey	MRX	840 m	MPC · JPL
369386	2009 VR_{6}	—	November 8, 2009	Mount Lemmon	Mount Lemmon Survey	·	1.5 km	MPC · JPL
369387	2009 VA_{17}	—	November 8, 2009	Mount Lemmon	Mount Lemmon Survey	·	3.6 km	MPC · JPL
369388	2009 VR_{33}	—	November 10, 2009	Catalina	CSS	·	2.1 km	MPC · JPL
369389	2009 VS_{33}	—	November 10, 2009	Catalina	CSS	GEF	1.3 km	MPC · JPL
369390	2009 VQ_{62}	—	November 8, 2009	Kitt Peak	Spacewatch	AGN	1.2 km	MPC · JPL
369391	2009 VB_{64}	—	November 8, 2009	Kitt Peak	Spacewatch	·	1.5 km	MPC · JPL
369392	2009 VJ_{76}	—	November 15, 2009	Catalina	CSS	·	2.4 km	MPC · JPL
369393	2009 VE_{79}	—	November 10, 2009	Catalina	CSS	·	1.9 km	MPC · JPL
369394	2009 VT_{82}	—	November 8, 2009	Kitt Peak	Spacewatch	EOS	3.8 km	MPC · JPL
369395	2009 VZ_{82}	—	November 9, 2009	Kitt Peak	Spacewatch	·	2.5 km	MPC · JPL
369396	2009 VC_{87}	—	November 10, 2009	Kitt Peak	Spacewatch	AEO	1.2 km	MPC · JPL
369397	2009 VP_{105}	—	November 12, 2009	La Sagra	OAM	AEO	1.9 km	MPC · JPL
369398	2009 VS_{112}	—	November 15, 2009	Siding Spring	SSS	·	1.7 km	MPC · JPL
369399	2009 VQ_{115}	—	November 15, 2009	Socorro	LINEAR	·	2.0 km	MPC · JPL
369400	2009 WS_{7}	—	November 18, 2009	Tzec Maun	D. Chestnov, A. Novichonok	AEO	1.3 km	MPC · JPL

== 369401–369500 ==
back to top

Designation			Discovery			Properties		Ref
Permanent	Provisional	Named after	Date	Site	Discoverer(s)	Category	Diam.	Ref
369401	2009 WL_{9}	—	November 18, 2009	Socorro	LINEAR	·	1.7 km	MPC · JPL
369402	2009 WQ_{18}	—	October 22, 2009	Mount Lemmon	Mount Lemmon Survey	KOR	1.5 km	MPC · JPL
369403	2009 WO_{21}	—	November 18, 2009	Kitt Peak	Spacewatch	EOS	4.0 km	MPC · JPL
369404	2009 WY_{24}	—	November 20, 2009	Westfield	Astronomical Research Observatory	·	1.6 km	MPC · JPL
369405	2009 WL_{25}	—	November 22, 2009	Mount Lemmon	Mount Lemmon Survey	EUP	5.9 km	MPC · JPL
369406	2009 WO_{25}	—	November 22, 2009	Catalina	CSS	·	2.0 km	MPC · JPL
369407	2009 WP_{43}	—	November 17, 2009	Kitt Peak	Spacewatch	KOR	1.9 km	MPC · JPL
369408	2009 WM_{44}	—	November 18, 2009	Kitt Peak	Spacewatch	·	2.6 km	MPC · JPL
369409	2009 WT_{46}	—	November 10, 2009	Kitt Peak	Spacewatch	·	2.9 km	MPC · JPL
369410	2009 WC_{66}	—	November 17, 2009	Mount Lemmon	Mount Lemmon Survey	·	1.5 km	MPC · JPL
369411	2009 WA_{80}	—	November 18, 2009	Kitt Peak	Spacewatch	EMA	5.0 km	MPC · JPL
369412	2009 WM_{85}	—	November 19, 2009	Kitt Peak	Spacewatch	·	3.0 km	MPC · JPL
369413	2009 WX_{91}	—	November 19, 2009	Mount Lemmon	Mount Lemmon Survey	·	2.5 km	MPC · JPL
369414	2009 WS_{98}	—	November 21, 2009	Kitt Peak	Spacewatch	·	2.5 km	MPC · JPL
369415	2009 WN_{101}	—	November 14, 2009	La Sagra	OAM	·	4.7 km	MPC · JPL
369416	2009 WT_{102}	—	November 22, 2009	Catalina	CSS	·	2.1 km	MPC · JPL
369417	2009 WO_{114}	—	March 12, 2007	Mount Lemmon	Mount Lemmon Survey	·	2.0 km	MPC · JPL
369418	2009 WF_{127}	—	February 25, 2006	Mount Lemmon	Mount Lemmon Survey	KOR	1.5 km	MPC · JPL
369419	2009 WY_{159}	—	November 21, 2009	Kitt Peak	Spacewatch	·	2.3 km	MPC · JPL
369420	2009 WF_{168}	—	November 22, 2009	Kitt Peak	Spacewatch	·	1.9 km	MPC · JPL
369421	2009 WT_{178}	—	November 23, 2009	Kitt Peak	Spacewatch	·	2.2 km	MPC · JPL
369422	2009 WY_{194}	—	November 24, 2009	Purple Mountain	PMO NEO Survey Program	EOS	2.5 km	MPC · JPL
369423 Quintegr'al	2009 WV_{195}	Quintegr'al	January 28, 2006	Nogales	J.-C. Merlin	·	1.6 km	MPC · JPL
369424	2009 WB_{205}	—	January 21, 2006	Mount Lemmon	Mount Lemmon Survey	AGN	1.3 km	MPC · JPL
369425	2009 WX_{208}	—	November 17, 2009	Kitt Peak	Spacewatch	·	2.4 km	MPC · JPL
369426	2009 WW_{210}	—	November 18, 2009	Kitt Peak	Spacewatch	·	2.2 km	MPC · JPL
369427	2009 WB_{211}	—	September 21, 2009	Mount Lemmon	Mount Lemmon Survey	·	2.4 km	MPC · JPL
369428	2009 WZ_{239}	—	September 24, 2008	Kitt Peak	Spacewatch	·	3.2 km	MPC · JPL
369429	2009 WN_{253}	—	November 16, 2009	Mount Lemmon	Mount Lemmon Survey	EMA	4.6 km	MPC · JPL
369430	2009 WT_{256}	—	November 24, 2009	Kitt Peak	Spacewatch	·	4.9 km	MPC · JPL
369431	2009 WU_{262}	—	November 21, 2009	Mount Lemmon	Mount Lemmon Survey	·	2.6 km	MPC · JPL
369432	2009 XG_{1}	—	December 10, 2009	Mayhill	Lowe, A.	·	5.4 km	MPC · JPL
369433	2009 XU_{11}	—	January 25, 2006	Kitt Peak	Spacewatch	THM	2.9 km	MPC · JPL
369434	2009 XB_{21}	—	December 15, 2009	Mount Lemmon	Mount Lemmon Survey	·	2.6 km	MPC · JPL
369435	2009 YS_{12}	—	February 9, 2005	Anderson Mesa	LONEOS	·	3.3 km	MPC · JPL
369436	2009 YM_{19}	—	November 23, 2009	Mount Lemmon	Mount Lemmon Survey	·	2.5 km	MPC · JPL
369437	2009 YS_{19}	—	December 25, 2009	Kitt Peak	Spacewatch	·	3.7 km	MPC · JPL
369438	2010 AO_{1}	—	January 5, 2010	Kitt Peak	Spacewatch	·	4.6 km	MPC · JPL
369439	2010 AB_{38}	—	January 7, 2010	Kitt Peak	Spacewatch	CYB	5.9 km	MPC · JPL
369440	2010 AM_{64}	—	January 10, 2010	Kitt Peak	Spacewatch	·	3.4 km	MPC · JPL
369441	2010 AT_{68}	—	January 12, 2010	Catalina	CSS	·	5.6 km	MPC · JPL
369442	2010 AV_{70}	—	January 12, 2010	Mount Lemmon	Mount Lemmon Survey	·	5.3 km	MPC · JPL
369443	2010 BP	—	January 16, 2010	Kitt Peak	Spacewatch	·	4.8 km	MPC · JPL
369444	2010 BS_{1}	—	January 18, 2010	Dauban	Kugel, F.	·	4.1 km	MPC · JPL
369445	2010 BF_{39}	—	January 19, 2010	WISE	WISE	·	2.3 km	MPC · JPL
369446	2010 BF_{63}	—	January 21, 2010	WISE	WISE	·	2.6 km	MPC · JPL
369447	2010 CX_{78}	—	February 13, 2010	Mount Lemmon	Mount Lemmon Survey	·	2.6 km	MPC · JPL
369448	2010 CV_{117}	—	September 28, 2008	Mount Lemmon	Mount Lemmon Survey	VER	4.2 km	MPC · JPL
369449	2010 CF_{148}	—	December 11, 2009	Mount Lemmon	Mount Lemmon Survey	·	4.4 km	MPC · JPL
369450	2010 CA_{167}	—	February 14, 2010	Mount Lemmon	Mount Lemmon Survey	·	4.6 km	MPC · JPL
369451	2010 CV_{249}	—	October 30, 2008	Catalina	CSS	·	4.0 km	MPC · JPL
369452	2010 LG_{14}	—	June 4, 2010	Kitt Peak	Spacewatch	APO +1km	940 m	MPC · JPL
369453	2010 LV_{75}	—	June 10, 2010	WISE	WISE	·	1.5 km	MPC · JPL
369454	2010 NZ_{1}	—	July 9, 2010	WISE	WISE	APO	850 m	MPC · JPL
369455	2010 OO_{8}	—	February 9, 2005	Anderson Mesa	LONEOS	·	1.5 km	MPC · JPL
369456	2010 OR_{122}	—	September 28, 2000	Kitt Peak	Spacewatch	·	1.2 km	MPC · JPL
369457	2010 QF_{3}	—	February 2, 2005	Kitt Peak	Spacewatch	V	830 m	MPC · JPL
369458	2010 RK_{45}	—	January 30, 2009	Mount Lemmon	Mount Lemmon Survey	·	730 m	MPC · JPL
369459	2010 RL_{45}	—	March 20, 1999	Apache Point	SDSS	·	710 m	MPC · JPL
369460	2010 RD_{61}	—	September 6, 2010	Kitt Peak	Spacewatch	·	2.3 km	MPC · JPL
369461	2010 RC_{68}	—	September 5, 2010	La Sagra	OAM	·	1.0 km	MPC · JPL
369462	2010 RY_{101}	—	September 22, 2003	Kitt Peak	Spacewatch	·	700 m	MPC · JPL
369463	2010 RA_{112}	—	September 11, 2010	Kitt Peak	Spacewatch	·	790 m	MPC · JPL
369464	2010 RC_{115}	—	December 16, 2007	Mount Lemmon	Mount Lemmon Survey	·	640 m	MPC · JPL
369465	2010 RT_{125}	—	November 13, 2007	Mount Lemmon	Mount Lemmon Survey	·	510 m	MPC · JPL
369466	2010 RA_{142}	—	October 9, 2007	Mount Lemmon	Mount Lemmon Survey	·	680 m	MPC · JPL
369467	2010 RG_{157}	—	December 20, 2004	Mount Lemmon	Mount Lemmon Survey	·	860 m	MPC · JPL
369468	2010 RJ_{176}	—	November 5, 2007	Kitt Peak	Spacewatch	·	480 m	MPC · JPL
369469	2010 SW_{14}	—	May 1, 2009	Kitt Peak	Spacewatch	·	670 m	MPC · JPL
369470	2010 SK_{18}	—	May 4, 2006	Mount Lemmon	Mount Lemmon Survey	·	600 m	MPC · JPL
369471	2010 TF_{1}	—	December 31, 2007	Mount Lemmon	Mount Lemmon Survey	·	530 m	MPC · JPL
369472	2010 TH_{23}	—	February 9, 2005	Mount Lemmon	Mount Lemmon Survey	·	550 m	MPC · JPL
369473	2010 TE_{34}	—	September 21, 2003	Kitt Peak	Spacewatch	·	770 m	MPC · JPL
369474	2010 TP_{34}	—	March 9, 2005	Mount Lemmon	Mount Lemmon Survey	V	550 m	MPC · JPL
369475	2010 TY_{76}	—	September 30, 2010	Vail-Jarnac	Glinos, T.	·	980 m	MPC · JPL
369476	2010 TE_{95}	—	November 3, 1999	Kitt Peak	Spacewatch	VER	2.6 km	MPC · JPL
369477	2010 TK_{96}	—	December 7, 2005	Kitt Peak	Spacewatch	·	3.0 km	MPC · JPL
369478	2010 TT_{105}	—	October 2, 1997	Kitt Peak	Spacewatch	·	610 m	MPC · JPL
369479	2010 TE_{117}	—	June 1, 2009	Mount Lemmon	Mount Lemmon Survey	·	1.0 km	MPC · JPL
369480	2010 TT_{139}	—	April 21, 2006	Kitt Peak	Spacewatch	·	990 m	MPC · JPL
369481	2010 TB_{152}	—	March 2, 2009	Kitt Peak	Spacewatch	·	720 m	MPC · JPL
369482	2010 TW_{170}	—	October 5, 2010	La Sagra	OAM	·	870 m	MPC · JPL
369483	2010 TO_{173}	—	September 9, 2010	Les Engarouines	L. Bernasconi	·	860 m	MPC · JPL
369484	2010 TT_{177}	—	October 2, 2010	La Sagra	OAM	·	770 m	MPC · JPL
369485	2010 UP_{6}	—	October 16, 2010	Mayhill-ISON	L. Elenin, A. Novichonok	·	1.3 km	MPC · JPL
369486	2010 UQ_{9}	—	May 7, 2000	Kitt Peak	Spacewatch	·	930 m	MPC · JPL
369487	2010 US_{39}	—	September 16, 2010	Mount Lemmon	Mount Lemmon Survey	·	670 m	MPC · JPL
369488	2010 UA_{55}	—	September 11, 2010	Mount Lemmon	Mount Lemmon Survey	·	920 m	MPC · JPL
369489	2010 UM_{55}	—	January 13, 2008	Mount Lemmon	Mount Lemmon Survey	·	780 m	MPC · JPL
369490	2010 UR_{62}	—	March 20, 1999	Apache Point	SDSS	·	720 m	MPC · JPL
369491	2010 US_{70}	—	October 21, 1997	Kitt Peak	Spacewatch	·	780 m	MPC · JPL
369492	2010 UT_{70}	—	December 27, 2003	Socorro	LINEAR	·	1.2 km	MPC · JPL
369493	2010 UE_{71}	—	September 24, 2000	Socorro	LINEAR	·	710 m	MPC · JPL
369494	2010 UQ_{74}	—	April 29, 2006	Siding Spring	SSS	·	920 m	MPC · JPL
369495	2010 UM_{99}	—	October 15, 2007	Mount Lemmon	Mount Lemmon Survey	·	650 m	MPC · JPL
369496	2010 UK_{101}	—	September 17, 1995	Kitt Peak	Spacewatch	MAS	670 m	MPC · JPL
369497	2010 UN_{105}	—	September 30, 2003	Kitt Peak	Spacewatch	·	690 m	MPC · JPL
369498	2010 VQ_{14}	—	September 16, 2003	Socorro	LINEAR	·	940 m	MPC · JPL
369499	2010 VY_{16}	—	November 3, 2007	Kitt Peak	Spacewatch	·	620 m	MPC · JPL
369500	2010 VG_{29}	—	September 20, 2003	Kitt Peak	Spacewatch	·	700 m	MPC · JPL

== 369501–369600 ==
back to top

Designation			Discovery			Properties		Ref
Permanent	Provisional	Named after	Date	Site	Discoverer(s)	Category	Diam.	Ref
369501	2010 VX_{33}	—	November 21, 2003	Socorro	LINEAR	·	800 m	MPC · JPL
369502	2010 VX_{36}	—	December 18, 2007	Mount Lemmon	Mount Lemmon Survey	·	860 m	MPC · JPL
369503	2010 VO_{47}	—	November 20, 2003	Socorro	LINEAR	·	760 m	MPC · JPL
369504	2010 VK_{50}	—	October 1, 2000	Socorro	LINEAR	·	650 m	MPC · JPL
369505	2010 VV_{75}	—	October 17, 2006	Catalina	CSS	·	1.5 km	MPC · JPL
369506	2010 VG_{91}	—	December 13, 2006	Mount Lemmon	Mount Lemmon Survey	RAF	1.1 km	MPC · JPL
369507	2010 VJ_{92}	—	November 25, 2005	Mount Lemmon	Mount Lemmon Survey	·	1.9 km	MPC · JPL
369508	2010 VN_{103}	—	February 8, 2008	Kitt Peak	Spacewatch	·	820 m	MPC · JPL
369509	2010 VJ_{114}	—	September 30, 2006	Catalina	CSS	V	920 m	MPC · JPL
369510	2010 VB_{116}	—	September 15, 2006	Kitt Peak	Spacewatch	·	1.3 km	MPC · JPL
369511	2010 VD_{127}	—	January 16, 2004	Kitt Peak	Spacewatch	·	800 m	MPC · JPL
369512	2010 VC_{153}	—	December 13, 2006	Mount Lemmon	Mount Lemmon Survey	·	1.7 km	MPC · JPL
369513	2010 VT_{161}	—	November 18, 2003	Kitt Peak	Spacewatch	·	670 m	MPC · JPL
369514	2010 VA_{168}	—	February 26, 2008	Mount Lemmon	Mount Lemmon Survey	·	940 m	MPC · JPL
369515	2010 VX_{173}	—	September 19, 2003	Kitt Peak	Spacewatch	·	580 m	MPC · JPL
369516	2010 VX_{175}	—	October 4, 2003	Kitt Peak	Spacewatch	·	970 m	MPC · JPL
369517	2010 VM_{179}	—	March 4, 2005	Mount Lemmon	Mount Lemmon Survey	·	570 m	MPC · JPL
369518	2010 VL_{210}	—	November 19, 2003	Kitt Peak	Spacewatch	·	1.3 km	MPC · JPL
369519	2010 VN_{213}	—	September 18, 2003	Kitt Peak	Spacewatch	·	730 m	MPC · JPL
369520	2010 VW_{216}	—	August 23, 2003	Palomar	NEAT	·	670 m	MPC · JPL
369521	2010 VH_{217}	—	October 17, 2003	Kitt Peak	Spacewatch	·	920 m	MPC · JPL
369522	2010 VW_{217}	—	October 27, 2003	Kitt Peak	Spacewatch	·	1.4 km	MPC · JPL
369523	2010 VQ_{219}	—	October 16, 2003	Kitt Peak	Spacewatch	·	580 m	MPC · JPL
369524	2010 WY_{21}	—	November 19, 2006	Kitt Peak	Spacewatch	·	1.2 km	MPC · JPL
369525	2010 WY_{41}	—	August 15, 1993	Kitt Peak	Spacewatch	·	730 m	MPC · JPL
369526	2010 WZ_{52}	—	October 24, 2005	Kitt Peak	Spacewatch	(13314)	1.9 km	MPC · JPL
369527	2010 WE_{62}	—	August 29, 2006	Catalina	CSS	·	980 m	MPC · JPL
369528	2010 WC_{72}	—	November 30, 2010	Mount Lemmon	Mount Lemmon Survey	·	1.4 km	MPC · JPL
369529	2010 WK_{72}	—	November 30, 2010	Mount Lemmon	Mount Lemmon Survey	·	2.6 km	MPC · JPL
369530	2010 XD_{2}	—	March 31, 2008	Kitt Peak	Spacewatch	·	1.2 km	MPC · JPL
369531	2010 XU_{13}	—	January 19, 2005	Kitt Peak	Spacewatch	·	860 m	MPC · JPL
369532	2010 XV_{56}	—	March 2, 1995	Kitt Peak	Spacewatch	·	1.4 km	MPC · JPL
369533	2010 XO_{59}	—	December 24, 2005	Kitt Peak	Spacewatch	·	3.0 km	MPC · JPL
369534	2010 XA_{67}	—	December 4, 2010	Mount Lemmon	Mount Lemmon Survey	·	1.7 km	MPC · JPL
369535	2010 XS_{72}	—	May 27, 2008	Mount Lemmon	Mount Lemmon Survey	EUN	1.6 km	MPC · JPL
369536	2010 XT_{80}	—	April 2, 2005	Catalina	CSS	T_{j} (2.98) · 3:2	7.8 km	MPC · JPL
369537	2010 XO_{88}	—	February 1, 2006	Siding Spring	SSS	THB	4.3 km	MPC · JPL
369538	2011 AL_{2}	—	September 20, 2009	Mount Lemmon	Mount Lemmon Survey	·	2.4 km	MPC · JPL
369539	2011 AP_{5}	—	January 30, 2001	Haleakala	NEAT	PHO	1.2 km	MPC · JPL
369540	2011 AA_{10}	—	November 4, 2005	Mount Lemmon	Mount Lemmon Survey	·	2.0 km	MPC · JPL
369541	2011 AE_{12}	—	August 11, 2004	Socorro	LINEAR	·	2.4 km	MPC · JPL
369542	2011 AT_{14}	—	November 5, 2010	Mount Lemmon	Mount Lemmon Survey	·	1.0 km	MPC · JPL
369543	2011 AK_{18}	—	October 29, 2005	Mount Lemmon	Mount Lemmon Survey	·	2.1 km	MPC · JPL
369544	2011 AG_{21}	—	May 16, 2007	Mount Lemmon	Mount Lemmon Survey	EOS	2.2 km	MPC · JPL
369545	2011 AK_{26}	—	February 21, 2007	Mount Lemmon	Mount Lemmon Survey	PAD	1.6 km	MPC · JPL
369546	2011 AN_{31}	—	December 6, 2010	Mount Lemmon	Mount Lemmon Survey	·	2.3 km	MPC · JPL
369547	2011 AC_{39}	—	September 16, 2009	Kitt Peak	Spacewatch	AGN	1.2 km	MPC · JPL
369548	2011 AO_{44}	—	September 18, 2009	Catalina	CSS	·	2.7 km	MPC · JPL
369549	2011 AP_{46}	—	February 26, 2007	Mount Lemmon	Mount Lemmon Survey	·	1.8 km	MPC · JPL
369550	2011 AZ_{47}	—	August 16, 2006	Siding Spring	SSS	PHO	970 m	MPC · JPL
369551	2011 AB_{51}	—	November 16, 2006	Kitt Peak	Spacewatch	·	1.0 km	MPC · JPL
369552	2011 AS_{51}	—	September 7, 2004	Kitt Peak	Spacewatch	·	1.7 km	MPC · JPL
369553	2011 AC_{59}	—	November 14, 2002	Socorro	LINEAR	·	1.2 km	MPC · JPL
369554	2011 AK_{59}	—	November 27, 2006	Mount Lemmon	Mount Lemmon Survey	·	1.9 km	MPC · JPL
369555	2011 AJ_{60}	—	September 30, 2006	Mount Lemmon	Mount Lemmon Survey	NYS	980 m	MPC · JPL
369556	2011 AV_{65}	—	December 25, 2005	Kitt Peak	Spacewatch	KOR	1.2 km	MPC · JPL
369557	2011 AG_{73}	—	August 6, 2002	Palomar	NEAT	·	1.3 km	MPC · JPL
369558	2011 AO_{74}	—	February 4, 2000	Kitt Peak	Spacewatch	·	1.6 km	MPC · JPL
369559	2011 AQ_{74}	—	September 6, 2008	Mount Lemmon	Mount Lemmon Survey	·	2.3 km	MPC · JPL
369560	2011 AK_{75}	—	January 27, 2010	WISE	WISE	EUP	3.8 km	MPC · JPL
369561	2011 BF_{3}	—	November 10, 2010	Mount Lemmon	Mount Lemmon Survey	·	1.2 km	MPC · JPL
369562	2011 BS_{8}	—	January 25, 2006	Kitt Peak	Spacewatch	·	1.6 km	MPC · JPL
369563	2011 BN_{13}	—	January 8, 2011	Mount Lemmon	Mount Lemmon Survey	·	3.2 km	MPC · JPL
369564	2011 BN_{14}	—	April 7, 2006	Siding Spring	SSS	·	4.3 km	MPC · JPL
369565	2011 BW_{14}	—	August 16, 2001	Palomar	NEAT	·	1.6 km	MPC · JPL
369566	2011 BH_{19}	—	August 13, 2006	Siding Spring	SSS	PHO	1.2 km	MPC · JPL
369567	2011 BL_{27}	—	December 29, 2005	Mount Lemmon	Mount Lemmon Survey	·	2.5 km	MPC · JPL
369568	2011 BV_{30}	—	December 8, 2010	Mount Lemmon	Mount Lemmon Survey	·	2.4 km	MPC · JPL
369569	2011 BB_{44}	—	March 13, 2007	Mount Lemmon	Mount Lemmon Survey	·	2.2 km	MPC · JPL
369570	2011 BF_{67}	—	January 10, 2007	Mount Lemmon	Mount Lemmon Survey	·	1.3 km	MPC · JPL
369571	2011 BW_{68}	—	December 6, 2005	Kitt Peak	Spacewatch	·	1.4 km	MPC · JPL
369572	2011 BW_{73}	—	February 21, 2007	Mount Lemmon	Mount Lemmon Survey	·	1.0 km	MPC · JPL
369573	2011 BY_{73}	—	April 23, 2007	Mount Graham	Trilling, D. E.	·	1.3 km	MPC · JPL
369574	2011 BL_{81}	—	November 11, 2005	Kitt Peak	Spacewatch	·	1.8 km	MPC · JPL
369575	2011 BM_{86}	—	October 25, 2005	Kitt Peak	Spacewatch	·	1.8 km	MPC · JPL
369576	2011 BH_{89}	—	October 3, 1999	Kitt Peak	Spacewatch	·	2.0 km	MPC · JPL
369577	2011 BV_{89}	—	September 28, 2009	Mount Lemmon	Mount Lemmon Survey	·	1.9 km	MPC · JPL
369578	2011 BY_{89}	—	August 3, 2004	Siding Spring	SSS	·	2.3 km	MPC · JPL
369579	2011 BP_{96}	—	January 29, 2011	Kitt Peak	Spacewatch	VER	2.8 km	MPC · JPL
369580	2011 BZ_{97}	—	October 17, 2001	Socorro	LINEAR	·	1.3 km	MPC · JPL
369581	2011 BD_{98}	—	October 14, 2009	Mount Lemmon	Mount Lemmon Survey	AGN	1.2 km	MPC · JPL
369582	2011 BY_{102}	—	February 19, 2001	Kitt Peak	Spacewatch	·	2.4 km	MPC · JPL
369583	2011 BN_{106}	—	March 5, 2002	Kitt Peak	Spacewatch	PAD	1.8 km	MPC · JPL
369584	2011 BV_{108}	—	September 30, 2003	Kitt Peak	Spacewatch	·	1.9 km	MPC · JPL
369585	2011 BD_{116}	—	September 17, 2009	Kitt Peak	Spacewatch	·	1.7 km	MPC · JPL
369586	2011 BR_{128}	—	April 13, 2008	Mount Lemmon	Mount Lemmon Survey	·	1.3 km	MPC · JPL
369587	2011 BG_{132}	—	February 26, 2007	Mount Lemmon	Mount Lemmon Survey	·	2.4 km	MPC · JPL
369588	2011 BS_{132}	—	August 23, 2004	Kitt Peak	Spacewatch	HOF	2.0 km	MPC · JPL
369589	2011 BH_{134}	—	August 21, 2004	Siding Spring	SSS	·	2.2 km	MPC · JPL
369590	2011 BZ_{153}	—	November 1, 2005	Kitt Peak	Spacewatch	·	1.2 km	MPC · JPL
369591	2011 BA_{161}	—	February 7, 2002	Kitt Peak	Spacewatch	·	1.9 km	MPC · JPL
369592	2011 CK_{4}	—	September 2, 2008	Kitt Peak	Spacewatch	·	4.2 km	MPC · JPL
369593	2011 CZ_{8}	—	November 24, 2002	Palomar	NEAT	·	1.2 km	MPC · JPL
369594	2011 CK_{14}	—	September 9, 2008	Mount Lemmon	Mount Lemmon Survey	·	3.2 km	MPC · JPL
369595	2011 CT_{17}	—	September 18, 2003	Kitt Peak	Spacewatch	·	2.6 km	MPC · JPL
369596	2011 CA_{24}	—	December 10, 2010	Mount Lemmon	Mount Lemmon Survey	KOR	1.5 km	MPC · JPL
369597	2011 CQ_{28}	—	February 25, 2007	Mount Lemmon	Mount Lemmon Survey	·	2.1 km	MPC · JPL
369598	2011 CF_{31}	—	January 30, 2003	Kitt Peak	Spacewatch	·	1.0 km	MPC · JPL
369599	2011 CW_{34}	—	August 8, 2004	Socorro	LINEAR	HNS	1.6 km	MPC · JPL
369600	2011 CC_{35}	—	February 6, 2002	Socorro	LINEAR	·	2.8 km	MPC · JPL

== 369601–369700 ==
back to top

Designation			Discovery			Properties		Ref
Permanent	Provisional	Named after	Date	Site	Discoverer(s)	Category	Diam.	Ref
369601	2011 CM_{43}	—	January 14, 2011	Kitt Peak	Spacewatch	AGN	1.0 km	MPC · JPL
369602	2011 CE_{46}	—	September 6, 2008	Kitt Peak	Spacewatch	·	2.6 km	MPC · JPL
369603	2011 CP_{46}	—	January 18, 2006	Catalina	CSS	·	2.5 km	MPC · JPL
369604	2011 CZ_{50}	—	December 11, 2004	Kitt Peak	Spacewatch	·	3.3 km	MPC · JPL
369605	2011 CL_{51}	—	February 5, 2000	Kitt Peak	Spacewatch	EOS	2.3 km	MPC · JPL
369606	2011 CN_{54}	—	March 26, 2007	Mount Lemmon	Mount Lemmon Survey	·	1.4 km	MPC · JPL
369607	2011 CT_{56}	—	February 8, 2011	Mount Lemmon	Mount Lemmon Survey	EOS	1.7 km	MPC · JPL
369608	2011 CB_{62}	—	September 12, 2004	Kitt Peak	Spacewatch	GEF	1.2 km	MPC · JPL
369609	2011 CW_{63}	—	July 5, 2005	Kitt Peak	Spacewatch	MAS	880 m	MPC · JPL
369610	2011 CH_{68}	—	September 10, 2004	Goodricke-Pigott	R. A. Tucker	·	2.6 km	MPC · JPL
369611	2011 CW_{68}	—	September 6, 2004	Siding Spring	SSS	·	3.0 km	MPC · JPL
369612	2011 CK_{70}	—	October 25, 2005	Catalina	CSS	·	2.7 km	MPC · JPL
369613	2011 CJ_{73}	—	February 4, 2005	Anderson Mesa	LONEOS	·	4.9 km	MPC · JPL
369614	2011 CN_{85}	—	September 5, 2008	Kitt Peak	Spacewatch	·	3.8 km	MPC · JPL
369615	2011 CW_{86}	—	December 24, 2005	Kitt Peak	Spacewatch	·	1.9 km	MPC · JPL
369616	2011 CZ_{87}	—	February 22, 2002	Palomar	NEAT	·	3.1 km	MPC · JPL
369617	2011 CH_{93}	—	September 20, 2003	Palomar	NEAT	EOS	2.0 km	MPC · JPL
369618	2011 CM_{104}	—	October 18, 2003	Palomar	NEAT	EOS	2.3 km	MPC · JPL
369619	2011 CD_{116}	—	February 24, 2006	Kitt Peak	Spacewatch	·	2.9 km	MPC · JPL
369620	2011 DT_{2}	—	October 22, 2003	Apache Point	SDSS	EOS	2.4 km	MPC · JPL
369621	2011 DB_{5}	—	November 20, 2004	Kitt Peak	Spacewatch	EOS	2.4 km	MPC · JPL
369622	2011 DO_{5}	—	January 6, 2006	Kitt Peak	Spacewatch	·	1.9 km	MPC · JPL
369623	2011 DY_{5}	—	August 30, 2008	Pises	C. Demeautis, Lopez, J.-M.	TIR	3.1 km	MPC · JPL
369624	2011 DH_{11}	—	February 9, 2010	WISE	WISE	·	3.5 km	MPC · JPL
369625	2011 DN_{17}	—	August 23, 2003	Cerro Tololo	Deep Ecliptic Survey	·	2.0 km	MPC · JPL
369626	2011 DO_{18}	—	October 16, 2009	Socorro	LINEAR	·	3.3 km	MPC · JPL
369627	2011 DQ_{18}	—	March 11, 2005	Mount Lemmon	Mount Lemmon Survey	·	2.7 km	MPC · JPL
369628	2011 DP_{22}	—	September 4, 2008	Kitt Peak	Spacewatch	EOS	1.9 km	MPC · JPL
369629	2011 DD_{23}	—	September 7, 2008	Mount Lemmon	Mount Lemmon Survey	·	3.0 km	MPC · JPL
369630	2011 DO_{24}	—	September 18, 2003	Palomar	NEAT	·	2.7 km	MPC · JPL
369631	2011 DV_{37}	—	August 21, 2008	Kitt Peak	Spacewatch	KOR	1.6 km	MPC · JPL
369632	2011 ED	—	September 17, 2009	Catalina	CSS	·	1.7 km	MPC · JPL
369633	2011 EG_{9}	—	February 22, 2006	Catalina	CSS	·	2.1 km	MPC · JPL
369634	2011 EG_{12}	—	February 16, 2010	WISE	WISE	·	4.7 km	MPC · JPL
369635	2011 EH_{12}	—	March 5, 2006	Anderson Mesa	LONEOS	·	3.7 km	MPC · JPL
369636	2011 EA_{19}	—	September 22, 2003	Anderson Mesa	LONEOS	·	2.5 km	MPC · JPL
369637	2011 EW_{20}	—	December 20, 2004	Mount Lemmon	Mount Lemmon Survey	·	4.1 km	MPC · JPL
369638	2011 EM_{24}	—	August 6, 2008	Siding Spring	SSS	BRA	2.8 km	MPC · JPL
369639	2011 ED_{45}	—	September 11, 2004	Kitt Peak	Spacewatch	GEF	1.3 km	MPC · JPL
369640	2011 EZ_{54}	—	November 27, 2009	Mount Lemmon	Mount Lemmon Survey	·	3.3 km	MPC · JPL
369641	2011 EY_{65}	—	March 2, 2006	Kitt Peak	Spacewatch	·	2.5 km	MPC · JPL
369642	2011 ER_{66}	—	February 14, 2005	Kitt Peak	Spacewatch	EOS	2.7 km	MPC · JPL
369643	2011 EX_{77}	—	January 23, 2006	Catalina	CSS	·	2.7 km	MPC · JPL
369644	2011 EB_{78}	—	December 17, 2003	Socorro	LINEAR	·	4.4 km	MPC · JPL
369645	2011 ES_{78}	—	April 9, 2006	Kitt Peak	Spacewatch	·	2.5 km	MPC · JPL
369646	2011 EN_{81}	—	November 30, 2003	Kitt Peak	Spacewatch	·	3.2 km	MPC · JPL
369647	2011 EU_{81}	—	April 19, 2007	Kitt Peak	Spacewatch	·	3.4 km	MPC · JPL
369648	2011 FQ_{1}	—	April 5, 2000	Kitt Peak	Spacewatch	·	3.4 km	MPC · JPL
369649	2011 FA_{20}	—	January 2, 2006	Catalina	CSS	·	2.9 km	MPC · JPL
369650	2011 FB_{23}	—	August 16, 2009	Kitt Peak	Spacewatch	·	2.7 km	MPC · JPL
369651	2011 FT_{24}	—	October 8, 2008	Kitt Peak	Spacewatch	·	3.0 km	MPC · JPL
369652	2011 FW_{38}	—	December 19, 2004	Mount Lemmon	Mount Lemmon Survey	AGN	1.5 km	MPC · JPL
369653	2011 FE_{44}	—	April 2, 2000	Kitt Peak	Spacewatch	THM	2.4 km	MPC · JPL
369654	2011 FU_{75}	—	September 29, 2008	Mount Lemmon	Mount Lemmon Survey	EOS	1.9 km	MPC · JPL
369655	2011 FK_{106}	—	October 3, 2003	Kitt Peak	Spacewatch	·	3.4 km	MPC · JPL
369656	2011 FU_{109}	—	December 2, 2004	Kitt Peak	Spacewatch	·	3.1 km	MPC · JPL
369657	2011 FF_{120}	—	March 5, 2006	Kitt Peak	Spacewatch	·	2.6 km	MPC · JPL
369658	2011 FG_{130}	—	October 3, 2003	Kitt Peak	Spacewatch	·	3.5 km	MPC · JPL
369659	2011 FA_{131}	—	November 9, 1999	Socorro	LINEAR	KOR	1.5 km	MPC · JPL
369660	2011 FQ_{149}	—	September 28, 2003	Kitt Peak	Spacewatch	·	1.7 km	MPC · JPL
369661	2011 FP_{155}	—	October 20, 2003	Kitt Peak	Spacewatch	·	2.7 km	MPC · JPL
369662	2011 GA_{59}	—	April 5, 2000	Socorro	LINEAR	·	3.7 km	MPC · JPL
369663	2011 GS_{72}	—	November 19, 2003	Palomar	NEAT	·	3.7 km	MPC · JPL
369664	2011 GL_{77}	—	September 4, 2008	Kitt Peak	Spacewatch	·	4.2 km	MPC · JPL
369665	2011 HF_{14}	—	October 9, 1999	Socorro	LINEAR	·	2.9 km	MPC · JPL
369666	2011 HY_{17}	—	March 17, 2005	Kitt Peak	Spacewatch	·	4.4 km	MPC · JPL
369667	2011 HM_{29}	—	November 1, 2005	Mount Lemmon	Mount Lemmon Survey	V	850 m	MPC · JPL
369668	2011 HU_{102}	—	September 14, 2002	Palomar	NEAT	·	3.9 km	MPC · JPL
369669	2011 JG_{3}	—	September 28, 2003	Kitt Peak	Spacewatch	·	2.8 km	MPC · JPL
369670	2011 KR_{20}	—	April 22, 2007	Mount Lemmon	Mount Lemmon Survey	·	900 m	MPC · JPL
369671	2011 KP_{31}	—	November 5, 2002	Kitt Peak	Spacewatch	·	4.4 km	MPC · JPL
369672	2011 SS_{89}	—	September 20, 2001	Socorro	LINEAR	·	630 m	MPC · JPL
369673	2011 ST_{254}	—	April 19, 2007	Lulin	LUSS	·	950 m	MPC · JPL
369674	2011 UZ_{181}	—	March 19, 2010	Kitt Peak	Spacewatch	·	2.2 km	MPC · JPL
369675	2011 UY_{278}	—	October 7, 2000	Anderson Mesa	LONEOS	NYS	1.0 km	MPC · JPL
369676	2011 VO_{12}	—	July 12, 2001	Palomar	NEAT	H	550 m	MPC · JPL
369677	2011 WQ_{5}	—	February 4, 2003	La Silla	Barbieri, C.	·	2.3 km	MPC · JPL
369678	2011 WB_{16}	—	December 28, 2003	Anderson Mesa	LONEOS	·	1.3 km	MPC · JPL
369679	2011 YU_{6}	—	April 20, 2009	Mount Lemmon	Mount Lemmon Survey	EUN	1.3 km	MPC · JPL
369680	2011 YX_{63}	—	September 3, 2005	Palomar	NEAT	H	650 m	MPC · JPL
369681	2011 YK_{75}	—	September 18, 2002	Anderson Mesa	LONEOS	H	740 m	MPC · JPL
369682	2012 AM_{2}	—	March 26, 2006	Kitt Peak	Spacewatch	·	620 m	MPC · JPL
369683	2012 AX_{17}	—	January 7, 2005	Catalina	CSS	PHO	2.0 km	MPC · JPL
369684	2012 BJ_{1}	—	January 29, 2004	Socorro	LINEAR	H	690 m	MPC · JPL
369685	2012 BU_{18}	—	February 21, 2002	Kitt Peak	Spacewatch	·	750 m	MPC · JPL
369686	2012 BL_{28}	—	October 14, 1999	Socorro	LINEAR	·	1.7 km	MPC · JPL
369687	2012 BD_{52}	—	February 13, 2005	La Silla	A. Boattini, H. Scholl	·	1.3 km	MPC · JPL
369688	2012 BZ_{72}	—	February 2, 2005	Kitt Peak	Spacewatch	·	860 m	MPC · JPL
369689	2012 BC_{75}	—	May 17, 2009	Mount Lemmon	Mount Lemmon Survey	·	870 m	MPC · JPL
369690	2012 BL_{96}	—	October 31, 2005	Catalina	CSS	H	870 m	MPC · JPL
369691	2012 BJ_{101}	—	February 13, 2002	Apache Point	SDSS	·	810 m	MPC · JPL
369692	2012 BE_{106}	—	May 24, 2006	Palomar	NEAT	·	1.1 km	MPC · JPL
369693	2012 BA_{122}	—	February 2, 2005	Kitt Peak	Spacewatch	·	1.2 km	MPC · JPL
369694	2012 BK_{129}	—	July 25, 2006	Palomar	NEAT	V	750 m	MPC · JPL
369695	2012 BT_{133}	—	May 8, 1997	Kitt Peak	Spacewatch	·	3.6 km	MPC · JPL
369696	2012 CO_{15}	—	December 30, 2007	Kitt Peak	Spacewatch	NYS	1.3 km	MPC · JPL
369697	2012 CV_{26}	—	April 15, 2005	Kitt Peak	Spacewatch	NYS	1.1 km	MPC · JPL
369698	2012 CH_{43}	—	March 6, 2008	Mount Lemmon	Mount Lemmon Survey	·	1.6 km	MPC · JPL
369699	2012 CU_{47}	—	October 29, 2003	Kitt Peak	Spacewatch	·	1.3 km	MPC · JPL
369700	2012 CC_{51}	—	September 17, 2010	Mount Lemmon	Mount Lemmon Survey	·	610 m	MPC · JPL

== 369701–369800 ==
back to top

Designation			Discovery			Properties		Ref
Permanent	Provisional	Named after	Date	Site	Discoverer(s)	Category	Diam.	Ref
369701	2012 DH_{3}	—	February 2, 2005	Kitt Peak	Spacewatch	·	840 m	MPC · JPL
369702	2012 DK_{9}	—	September 4, 2010	Mount Lemmon	Mount Lemmon Survey	·	650 m	MPC · JPL
369703	2012 DL_{16}	—	November 2, 2007	Mount Lemmon	Mount Lemmon Survey	·	710 m	MPC · JPL
369704	2012 DM_{19}	—	August 27, 2009	Kitt Peak	Spacewatch	·	2.1 km	MPC · JPL
369705	2012 DN_{26}	—	September 3, 2000	Kitt Peak	Spacewatch	·	960 m	MPC · JPL
369706	2012 DA_{27}	—	September 20, 2003	Palomar	NEAT	·	1.0 km	MPC · JPL
369707	2012 DB_{27}	—	March 13, 1996	Kitt Peak	Spacewatch	·	2.4 km	MPC · JPL
369708	2012 DP_{27}	—	February 9, 2007	Kitt Peak	Spacewatch	·	1.8 km	MPC · JPL
369709	2012 DT_{36}	—	October 27, 2005	Kitt Peak	Spacewatch	·	2.3 km	MPC · JPL
369710	2012 DL_{37}	—	December 14, 2007	Mount Lemmon	Mount Lemmon Survey	·	940 m	MPC · JPL
369711	2012 DR_{37}	—	April 28, 2003	Anderson Mesa	LONEOS	DOR	3.8 km	MPC · JPL
369712	2012 DR_{40}	—	May 12, 2005	Catalina	CSS	·	1.6 km	MPC · JPL
369713	2012 DB_{50}	—	September 4, 2008	Kitt Peak	Spacewatch	LIX	3.2 km	MPC · JPL
369714	2012 DF_{50}	—	April 25, 2008	Kitt Peak	Spacewatch	·	1.6 km	MPC · JPL
369715	2012 DW_{52}	—	March 3, 2005	Catalina	CSS	·	850 m	MPC · JPL
369716	2012 DC_{58}	—	April 18, 2002	Kitt Peak	Spacewatch	·	770 m	MPC · JPL
369717	2012 DE_{60}	—	February 7, 2008	Kitt Peak	Spacewatch	V	850 m	MPC · JPL
369718	2012 DT_{69}	—	August 31, 2003	Kitt Peak	Spacewatch	·	720 m	MPC · JPL
369719	2012 DE_{74}	—	March 19, 2001	Kitt Peak	Spacewatch	MAS	730 m	MPC · JPL
369720	2012 DG_{74}	—	March 2, 2008	Kitt Peak	Spacewatch	·	1.1 km	MPC · JPL
369721	2012 DC_{78}	—	November 6, 2010	Mount Lemmon	Mount Lemmon Survey	·	3.0 km	MPC · JPL
369722	2012 DY_{78}	—	March 18, 2004	Siding Spring	SSS	·	3.3 km	MPC · JPL
369723	2012 DB_{79}	—	February 22, 2012	Catalina	CSS	EUN	1.9 km	MPC · JPL
369724	2012 DN_{79}	—	February 1, 2005	Kitt Peak	Spacewatch	·	830 m	MPC · JPL
369725	2012 DH_{81}	—	October 15, 2004	Mount Lemmon	Mount Lemmon Survey	·	670 m	MPC · JPL
369726	2012 DL_{82}	—	January 27, 2007	Mount Lemmon	Mount Lemmon Survey	·	1.7 km	MPC · JPL
369727	2012 DQ_{86}	—	February 15, 2007	Catalina	CSS	·	3.6 km	MPC · JPL
369728	2012 DA_{87}	—	October 13, 2010	Mount Lemmon	Mount Lemmon Survey	(5)	1.6 km	MPC · JPL
369729	2012 DL_{89}	—	January 30, 2008	Kitt Peak	Spacewatch	·	1.2 km	MPC · JPL
369730	2012 DC_{93}	—	October 13, 2006	Kitt Peak	Spacewatch	·	1.3 km	MPC · JPL
369731	2012 DM_{98}	—	March 20, 1999	Apache Point	SDSS	·	2.3 km	MPC · JPL
369732	2012 EZ_{2}	—	February 7, 1997	Kitt Peak	Spacewatch	·	1.3 km	MPC · JPL
369733	2012 EK_{11}	—	April 15, 2007	Catalina	CSS	EOS	2.3 km	MPC · JPL
369734	2012 EP_{11}	—	January 5, 2006	Kitt Peak	Spacewatch	·	2.1 km	MPC · JPL
369735	2012 EX_{12}	—	February 24, 2008	Mount Lemmon	Mount Lemmon Survey	·	1.7 km	MPC · JPL
369736	2012 FS_{1}	—	January 19, 2001	Socorro	LINEAR	·	3.0 km	MPC · JPL
369737	2012 FD_{5}	—	November 1, 2006	Mount Lemmon	Mount Lemmon Survey	·	1.4 km	MPC · JPL
369738	2012 FR_{5}	—	September 26, 1995	Kitt Peak	Spacewatch	·	2.2 km	MPC · JPL
369739	2012 FT_{6}	—	November 3, 2007	Kitt Peak	Spacewatch	·	590 m	MPC · JPL
369740	2012 FZ_{10}	—	February 9, 2005	Kitt Peak	Spacewatch	·	780 m	MPC · JPL
369741	2012 FY_{14}	—	August 31, 2005	Kitt Peak	Spacewatch	KON	3.3 km	MPC · JPL
369742	2012 FZ_{26}	—	November 18, 2003	Kitt Peak	Spacewatch	·	1.1 km	MPC · JPL
369743	2012 FZ_{28}	—	December 3, 2002	Palomar	NEAT	PHO	1.5 km	MPC · JPL
369744	2012 FS_{29}	—	March 4, 2005	Mount Lemmon	Mount Lemmon Survey	·	800 m	MPC · JPL
369745	2012 FB_{30}	—	August 28, 2005	Kitt Peak	Spacewatch	·	1.6 km	MPC · JPL
369746	2012 FP_{33}	—	October 3, 2003	Kitt Peak	Spacewatch	·	1.1 km	MPC · JPL
369747	2012 FX_{34}	—	September 30, 2003	Kitt Peak	Spacewatch	·	2.2 km	MPC · JPL
369748	2012 FU_{40}	—	August 31, 2005	Kitt Peak	Spacewatch	EUN	1.3 km	MPC · JPL
369749	2012 FT_{41}	—	July 10, 2005	Siding Spring	SSS	MAS	1.1 km	MPC · JPL
369750	2012 FA_{53}	—	March 13, 2002	Kitt Peak	Spacewatch	·	1.1 km	MPC · JPL
369751	2012 FS_{58}	—	December 15, 2006	Kitt Peak	Spacewatch	·	1.2 km	MPC · JPL
369752	2012 FE_{63}	—	September 15, 2009	Mount Lemmon	Mount Lemmon Survey	·	1 km	MPC · JPL
369753	2012 FU_{63}	—	March 21, 2001	Kitt Peak	Spacewatch	·	2.7 km	MPC · JPL
369754	2012 FJ_{70}	—	November 18, 2009	Kitt Peak	Spacewatch	·	4.3 km	MPC · JPL
369755	2012 FQ_{70}	—	December 22, 2003	Kitt Peak	Spacewatch	·	1.4 km	MPC · JPL
369756	2012 FG_{72}	—	May 9, 2008	Siding Spring	SSS	·	2.0 km	MPC · JPL
369757	2012 FP_{72}	—	November 23, 2006	Kitt Peak	Spacewatch	·	1.7 km	MPC · JPL
369758	2012 FT_{74}	—	April 16, 2004	Siding Spring	SSS	·	1.5 km	MPC · JPL
369759	2012 FW_{74}	—	June 10, 2007	Siding Spring	SSS	·	2.7 km	MPC · JPL
369760	2012 FX_{74}	—	September 25, 2000	Kitt Peak	Spacewatch	GEF	1.8 km	MPC · JPL
369761	2012 FJ_{76}	—	January 30, 2011	Mount Lemmon	Mount Lemmon Survey	T_{j} (2.99)	4.9 km	MPC · JPL
369762	2012 FR_{76}	—	March 9, 2005	Mount Lemmon	Mount Lemmon Survey	·	990 m	MPC · JPL
369763	2012 FG_{77}	—	March 15, 2002	Palomar	NEAT	·	850 m	MPC · JPL
369764	2012 FK_{77}	—	May 10, 2002	Kitt Peak	Spacewatch	·	800 m	MPC · JPL
369765	2012 FL_{78}	—	March 15, 2001	Kitt Peak	Spacewatch	NYS	1.5 km	MPC · JPL
369766	2012 GZ	—	February 9, 2003	Palomar	NEAT	·	1.9 km	MPC · JPL
369767	2012 GK_{4}	—	November 23, 2003	Kitt Peak	Spacewatch	V	640 m	MPC · JPL
369768	2012 GA_{8}	—	April 26, 2003	Kitt Peak	Spacewatch	·	1.9 km	MPC · JPL
369769	2012 GF_{11}	—	March 10, 2005	Mount Lemmon	Mount Lemmon Survey	V	670 m	MPC · JPL
369770	2012 GS_{12}	—	April 16, 2007	Catalina	CSS	BRA	2.0 km	MPC · JPL
369771	2012 GR_{13}	—	February 9, 2003	Palomar	NEAT	·	1.9 km	MPC · JPL
369772	2012 GD_{21}	—	April 4, 2008	Mount Lemmon	Mount Lemmon Survey	·	1.6 km	MPC · JPL
369773	2012 GM_{21}	—	February 27, 2006	Kitt Peak	Spacewatch	·	4.3 km	MPC · JPL
369774	2012 GA_{23}	—	December 16, 2006	Mount Lemmon	Mount Lemmon Survey	·	2.2 km	MPC · JPL
369775	2012 GG_{23}	—	April 21, 2004	Socorro	LINEAR	EUN	1.8 km	MPC · JPL
369776	2012 GH_{23}	—	May 6, 2008	Siding Spring	SSS	·	2.0 km	MPC · JPL
369777	2012 GK_{23}	—	August 24, 2008	Kitt Peak	Spacewatch	·	3.7 km	MPC · JPL
369778	2012 GS_{26}	—	October 27, 2005	Mount Lemmon	Mount Lemmon Survey	·	1.5 km	MPC · JPL
369779	2012 GU_{26}	—	October 30, 2005	Kitt Peak	Spacewatch	WIT	1.1 km	MPC · JPL
369780	2012 GP_{28}	—	January 23, 2006	Kitt Peak	Spacewatch	·	2.5 km	MPC · JPL
369781	2012 GO_{29}	—	April 18, 2007	Mount Lemmon	Mount Lemmon Survey	·	2.3 km	MPC · JPL
369782	2012 GX_{29}	—	March 8, 2005	Mount Lemmon	Mount Lemmon Survey	·	880 m	MPC · JPL
369783	2012 GJ_{30}	—	October 26, 2003	Kitt Peak	Spacewatch	·	820 m	MPC · JPL
369784	2012 GJ_{31}	—	March 15, 2008	Mount Lemmon	Mount Lemmon Survey	·	1.3 km	MPC · JPL
369785	2012 GK_{32}	—	April 30, 2004	Kitt Peak	Spacewatch	·	1.1 km	MPC · JPL
369786	2012 GV_{34}	—	May 11, 2007	Mount Lemmon	Mount Lemmon Survey	·	2.2 km	MPC · JPL
369787	2012 GJ_{38}	—	January 5, 2010	Kitt Peak	Spacewatch	·	4.2 km	MPC · JPL
369788	2012 HZ_{8}	—	September 27, 2009	Mount Lemmon	Mount Lemmon Survey	·	2.5 km	MPC · JPL
369789	2012 HT_{11}	—	September 27, 2009	Mount Lemmon	Mount Lemmon Survey	·	2.6 km	MPC · JPL
369790	2012 HA_{13}	—	September 27, 2003	Apache Point	SDSS	·	3.4 km	MPC · JPL
369791	2012 HW_{17}	—	February 24, 2006	Kitt Peak	Spacewatch	·	2.6 km	MPC · JPL
369792	2012 HB_{18}	—	February 12, 2011	Mount Lemmon	Mount Lemmon Survey	·	3.2 km	MPC · JPL
369793	2012 HL_{18}	—	June 27, 1998	Kitt Peak	Spacewatch	·	2.7 km	MPC · JPL
369794	2012 HH_{21}	—	February 17, 2007	Catalina	CSS	·	2.8 km	MPC · JPL
369795	2012 HX_{23}	—	September 28, 2003	Apache Point	SDSS	·	3.6 km	MPC · JPL
369796	2012 HT_{26}	—	June 11, 1996	Kitt Peak	Spacewatch	·	2.9 km	MPC · JPL
369797	2012 HV_{26}	—	October 25, 1995	Kitt Peak	Spacewatch	·	1.9 km	MPC · JPL
369798	2012 HX_{26}	—	September 13, 2005	Kitt Peak	Spacewatch	·	1.5 km	MPC · JPL
369799	2012 HK_{27}	—	July 5, 2005	Kitt Peak	Spacewatch	EUN	1.7 km	MPC · JPL
369800	2012 HS_{28}	—	November 19, 2008	Dauban	Kugel, F.	LIX	4.4 km	MPC · JPL

== 369801–369900 ==
back to top

Designation			Discovery			Properties		Ref
Permanent	Provisional	Named after	Date	Site	Discoverer(s)	Category	Diam.	Ref
369801	2012 HU_{31}	—	September 6, 2008	Mount Lemmon	Mount Lemmon Survey	·	2.8 km	MPC · JPL
369802	2012 HA_{33}	—	February 2, 2006	Kitt Peak	Spacewatch	·	1.5 km	MPC · JPL
369803	2012 HZ_{39}	—	March 9, 1995	Kitt Peak	Spacewatch	·	4.0 km	MPC · JPL
369804	2012 HR_{40}	—	October 1, 2005	Kitt Peak	Spacewatch	·	1.7 km	MPC · JPL
369805	2012 HJ_{41}	—	September 3, 2008	Kitt Peak	Spacewatch	·	3.5 km	MPC · JPL
369806	2012 HU_{41}	—	August 24, 2008	Kitt Peak	Spacewatch	TIR	3.1 km	MPC · JPL
369807	2012 HR_{42}	—	August 31, 2000	Kitt Peak	Spacewatch	·	1.8 km	MPC · JPL
369808	2012 HY_{44}	—	September 22, 2003	Kitt Peak	Spacewatch	·	3.2 km	MPC · JPL
369809	2012 HE_{47}	—	February 17, 2007	Kitt Peak	Spacewatch	·	2.6 km	MPC · JPL
369810	2012 HR_{47}	—	June 13, 2004	Kitt Peak	Spacewatch	·	1.6 km	MPC · JPL
369811	2012 HH_{52}	—	September 16, 2009	Kitt Peak	Spacewatch	·	1.9 km	MPC · JPL
369812	2012 HJ_{53}	—	August 9, 2004	Socorro	LINEAR	·	2.0 km	MPC · JPL
369813	2012 HK_{53}	—	October 29, 2003	Kitt Peak	Spacewatch	·	4.2 km	MPC · JPL
369814	2012 HT_{53}	—	April 16, 2001	Kitt Peak	Spacewatch	·	3.0 km	MPC · JPL
369815	2012 HD_{55}	—	February 12, 2004	Kitt Peak	Spacewatch	NYS	1.2 km	MPC · JPL
369816	2012 HP_{55}	—	January 10, 2007	Kitt Peak	Spacewatch	·	1.9 km	MPC · JPL
369817	2012 HZ_{59}	—	March 28, 2003	Kitt Peak	Spacewatch	·	2.4 km	MPC · JPL
369818	2012 HB_{60}	—	September 19, 2003	Kitt Peak	Spacewatch	·	2.4 km	MPC · JPL
369819	2012 HD_{60}	—	January 30, 2011	Haleakala	Pan-STARRS 1	CYB	4.0 km	MPC · JPL
369820	2012 HP_{63}	—	April 25, 1995	Kitt Peak	Spacewatch	·	5.5 km	MPC · JPL
369821	2012 HJ_{64}	—	August 28, 2005	Kitt Peak	Spacewatch	·	1.0 km	MPC · JPL
369822	2012 HY_{65}	—	October 23, 2009	Mount Lemmon	Mount Lemmon Survey	·	2.7 km	MPC · JPL
369823	2012 HL_{66}	—	January 10, 2011	Mount Lemmon	Mount Lemmon Survey	·	2.6 km	MPC · JPL
369824	2012 HP_{70}	—	September 4, 2008	Kitt Peak	Spacewatch	·	3.0 km	MPC · JPL
369825	2012 HN_{71}	—	September 22, 2008	Mount Lemmon	Mount Lemmon Survey	·	2.5 km	MPC · JPL
369826	2012 HZ_{73}	—	September 30, 2005	Mount Lemmon	Mount Lemmon Survey	·	1.6 km	MPC · JPL
369827	2012 HV_{79}	—	January 28, 1995	Kitt Peak	Spacewatch	·	1.6 km	MPC · JPL
369828	2012 HM_{81}	—	October 29, 2005	Mount Lemmon	Mount Lemmon Survey	·	1.5 km	MPC · JPL
369829	2012 HL_{84}	—	September 18, 2009	Siding Spring	SSS	·	3.0 km	MPC · JPL
369830	2012 JS	—	August 17, 2009	Catalina	CSS	EUN	1.7 km	MPC · JPL
369831	2012 JC_{4}	—	April 3, 2000	Kitt Peak	Spacewatch	·	3.6 km	MPC · JPL
369832	2012 JA_{6}	—	October 1, 2008	Mount Lemmon	Mount Lemmon Survey	EUP	6.3 km	MPC · JPL
369833	2012 JB_{8}	—	June 18, 2005	Mount Lemmon	Mount Lemmon Survey	·	1.5 km	MPC · JPL
369834	2012 JV_{10}	—	January 28, 2011	Mount Lemmon	Mount Lemmon Survey	·	3.9 km	MPC · JPL
369835	2012 JW_{13}	—	May 11, 2007	Mount Lemmon	Mount Lemmon Survey	EOS	1.9 km	MPC · JPL
369836	2012 JH_{15}	—	February 12, 2002	Kitt Peak	Spacewatch	·	1.9 km	MPC · JPL
369837	2012 JR_{16}	—	October 26, 2005	Kitt Peak	Spacewatch	·	1.7 km	MPC · JPL
369838	2012 JD_{17}	—	December 13, 2006	Kitt Peak	Spacewatch	·	1.6 km	MPC · JPL
369839	2012 JP_{19}	—	October 17, 1995	Kitt Peak	Spacewatch	AGN	1.5 km	MPC · JPL
369840	2012 JU_{22}	—	May 17, 2007	Catalina	CSS	EOS	2.5 km	MPC · JPL
369841	2012 JD_{26}	—	May 7, 2002	Palomar	NEAT	·	3.0 km	MPC · JPL
369842	2012 JY_{29}	—	September 21, 2003	Kitt Peak	Spacewatch	·	1.8 km	MPC · JPL
369843	2012 JH_{34}	—	January 31, 2006	Kitt Peak	Spacewatch	KOR	1.5 km	MPC · JPL
369844	2012 JO_{38}	—	April 1, 2005	Kitt Peak	Spacewatch	·	750 m	MPC · JPL
369845	2012 JV_{38}	—	February 8, 2002	Kitt Peak	Deep Ecliptic Survey	AGN	1.3 km	MPC · JPL
369846	2012 JJ_{41}	—	May 28, 2008	Mount Lemmon	Mount Lemmon Survey	·	1.7 km	MPC · JPL
369847	2012 JR_{45}	—	May 4, 2006	Mount Lemmon	Mount Lemmon Survey	·	3.4 km	MPC · JPL
369848	2012 JV_{45}	—	November 8, 2009	Mount Lemmon	Mount Lemmon Survey	·	2.0 km	MPC · JPL
369849	2012 JP_{48}	—	March 24, 2003	Kitt Peak	Spacewatch	·	1.5 km	MPC · JPL
369850	2012 JG_{49}	—	October 24, 2005	Kitt Peak	Spacewatch	·	1.4 km	MPC · JPL
369851	2012 JD_{50}	—	September 28, 2009	Mount Lemmon	Mount Lemmon Survey	·	2.1 km	MPC · JPL
369852	2012 JA_{51}	—	August 30, 2005	Kitt Peak	Spacewatch	·	1.2 km	MPC · JPL
369853	2012 JY_{52}	—	October 25, 2009	Kitt Peak	Spacewatch	·	2.8 km	MPC · JPL
369854	2012 JO_{58}	—	September 15, 2009	Kitt Peak	Spacewatch	·	2.3 km	MPC · JPL
369855	2012 JD_{60}	—	March 20, 2007	Kitt Peak	Spacewatch	·	2.1 km	MPC · JPL
369856	2012 JV_{61}	—	September 19, 2003	Kitt Peak	Spacewatch	·	2.1 km	MPC · JPL
369857	2012 JE_{63}	—	September 18, 1995	Kitt Peak	Spacewatch	·	3.5 km	MPC · JPL
369858	2012 JJ_{63}	—	February 7, 2006	Mount Lemmon	Mount Lemmon Survey	·	2.7 km	MPC · JPL
369859	2012 JT_{64}	—	March 26, 2007	Mount Lemmon	Mount Lemmon Survey	·	2.2 km	MPC · JPL
369860	2012 JE_{65}	—	October 8, 2008	Mount Lemmon	Mount Lemmon Survey	·	3.8 km	MPC · JPL
369861	2012 KN_{6}	—	October 14, 1998	Kitt Peak	Spacewatch	·	2.2 km	MPC · JPL
369862	2012 KH_{10}	—	September 29, 2008	Mount Lemmon	Mount Lemmon Survey	TEL	1.6 km	MPC · JPL
369863	2012 KK_{15}	—	October 8, 2004	Kitt Peak	Spacewatch	·	1.9 km	MPC · JPL
369864	2012 KK_{17}	—	October 24, 2005	Mauna Kea	A. Boattini	AGN	1.4 km	MPC · JPL
369865	2012 KL_{17}	—	March 5, 2006	Anderson Mesa	LONEOS	·	4.3 km	MPC · JPL
369866	2012 KA_{20}	—	April 1, 2008	Kitt Peak	Spacewatch	·	1.2 km	MPC · JPL
369867	2012 KK_{21}	—	November 16, 2009	Mount Lemmon	Mount Lemmon Survey	·	2.1 km	MPC · JPL
369868	2012 KM_{25}	—	February 23, 2007	Kitt Peak	Spacewatch	(5)	1.8 km	MPC · JPL
369869	2012 KR_{27}	—	October 1, 1995	Kitt Peak	Spacewatch	·	2.1 km	MPC · JPL
369870	2012 KV_{29}	—	September 21, 2003	Kitt Peak	Spacewatch	EOS	2.4 km	MPC · JPL
369871	2012 KV_{30}	—	August 15, 2002	Kitt Peak	Spacewatch	·	3.3 km	MPC · JPL
369872	2012 KA_{41}	—	July 30, 2005	Palomar	NEAT	·	1.2 km	MPC · JPL
369873	2012 KC_{44}	—	March 15, 2007	Mount Lemmon	Mount Lemmon Survey	HOF	4.3 km	MPC · JPL
369874	2012 KN_{45}	—	August 23, 2008	Kitt Peak	Spacewatch	·	4.1 km	MPC · JPL
369875	2012 KV_{48}	—	February 9, 2002	Kitt Peak	Spacewatch	·	2.6 km	MPC · JPL
369876	2012 KG_{50}	—	January 17, 2005	Kitt Peak	Spacewatch	EOS	2.5 km	MPC · JPL
369877	2012 LK_{4}	—	February 27, 2008	Mount Lemmon	Mount Lemmon Survey	·	1.1 km	MPC · JPL
369878	2012 LB_{7}	—	February 25, 2006	Mount Lemmon	Mount Lemmon Survey	·	2.8 km	MPC · JPL
369879	2012 LR_{10}	—	September 3, 2005	Palomar	NEAT	·	1.7 km	MPC · JPL
369880	2012 LO_{26}	—	January 17, 2007	Kitt Peak	Spacewatch	·	1.5 km	MPC · JPL
369881	2012 MF_{6}	—	November 15, 2003	Kitt Peak	Spacewatch	L5	10 km	MPC · JPL
369882	2012 MH_{8}	—	December 21, 2008	Catalina	CSS	·	4.2 km	MPC · JPL
369883	2012 QR_{18}	—	November 6, 2002	Palomar	NEAT	·	840 m	MPC · JPL
369884	2012 QC_{23}	—	October 11, 1999	Socorro	LINEAR	·	1.9 km	MPC · JPL
369885	2012 QM_{28}	—	February 25, 2006	Mount Lemmon	Mount Lemmon Survey	WIT	1.2 km	MPC · JPL
369886	2012 RM_{6}	—	February 28, 2005	Catalina	CSS	L5	10 km	MPC · JPL
369887	2012 RZ_{19}	—	October 3, 1999	Socorro	LINEAR	·	2.1 km	MPC · JPL
369888	2012 RV_{27}	—	March 26, 2007	Mount Lemmon	Mount Lemmon Survey	·	1.5 km	MPC · JPL
369889	2012 RT_{31}	—	August 19, 2002	Palomar	NEAT	·	2.9 km	MPC · JPL
369890	2012 TN_{27}	—	February 8, 2002	Palomar	NEAT	·	2.1 km	MPC · JPL
369891	2012 TY_{31}	—	March 27, 2004	Socorro	LINEAR	·	4.7 km	MPC · JPL
369892	2012 TT_{66}	—	December 16, 2007	Mount Lemmon	Mount Lemmon Survey	·	3.3 km	MPC · JPL
369893	2012 TW_{72}	—	August 30, 2002	Palomar	NEAT	·	1.8 km	MPC · JPL
369894	2012 TM_{120}	—	October 28, 2005	Mount Lemmon	Mount Lemmon Survey	·	1.3 km	MPC · JPL
369895	2012 TT_{133}	—	February 4, 2006	Kitt Peak	Spacewatch	·	1.7 km	MPC · JPL
369896	2012 TC_{210}	—	March 14, 2005	Mount Lemmon	Mount Lemmon Survey	EOS	2.5 km	MPC · JPL
369897	2012 TY_{229}	—	October 7, 2007	Kitt Peak	Spacewatch	·	3.1 km	MPC · JPL
369898	2012 TU_{271}	—	December 1, 2003	Kitt Peak	Spacewatch	KOR	1.5 km	MPC · JPL
369899	2012 TO_{288}	—	April 8, 2002	Palomar	NEAT	EUN	1.7 km	MPC · JPL
369900	2012 UD_{2}	—	March 14, 2004	Kitt Peak	Spacewatch	·	640 m	MPC · JPL

== 369901–370000 ==
back to top

Designation			Discovery			Properties		Ref
Permanent	Provisional	Named after	Date	Site	Discoverer(s)	Category	Diam.	Ref
369901	2012 UA_{50}	—	January 25, 2006	Kitt Peak	Spacewatch	·	1.0 km	MPC · JPL
369902	2012 UE_{132}	—	March 3, 2005	Catalina	CSS	GEF	1.7 km	MPC · JPL
369903	2012 UN_{167}	—	April 19, 2007	Mount Lemmon	Mount Lemmon Survey	·	1.4 km	MPC · JPL
369904	2012 VT_{100}	—	April 9, 2010	Mount Lemmon	Mount Lemmon Survey	·	3.2 km	MPC · JPL
369905	2013 AQ_{30}	—	October 29, 2003	Kitt Peak	Spacewatch	·	1.8 km	MPC · JPL
369906	2013 AF_{57}	—	December 12, 2006	Kitt Peak	Spacewatch	·	3.9 km	MPC · JPL
369907	2013 AA_{81}	—	October 15, 2001	Apache Point	SDSS	KOR	1.6 km	MPC · JPL
369908	2013 AS_{121}	—	August 3, 2004	Siding Spring	SSS	V	820 m	MPC · JPL
369909	2013 BW_{25}	—	May 26, 2003	Kitt Peak	Spacewatch	·	3.7 km	MPC · JPL
369910	2013 CW_{45}	—	December 1, 2003	Kitt Peak	Spacewatch	·	1.7 km	MPC · JPL
369911	2013 CF_{162}	—	October 4, 2002	Apache Point	SDSS	EUN	1.0 km	MPC · JPL
369912	2013 CQ_{165}	—	October 7, 2004	Kitt Peak	Spacewatch	THM	2.6 km	MPC · JPL
369913	2013 CG_{174}	—	November 21, 2008	Kitt Peak	Spacewatch	·	1.1 km	MPC · JPL
369914	2013 CF_{176}	—	August 29, 2002	Palomar	NEAT	MAR	1.4 km	MPC · JPL
369915	2013 CJ_{176}	—	January 11, 1999	Kitt Peak	Spacewatch	·	660 m	MPC · JPL
369916	2013 CO_{180}	—	December 26, 2005	Marly	P. Kocher	CYB	4.7 km	MPC · JPL
369917	2013 CH_{196}	—	January 12, 2000	Kitt Peak	Spacewatch	L4	7.5 km	MPC · JPL
369918	2013 CJ_{204}	—	October 5, 2002	Palomar	NEAT	WIT	890 m	MPC · JPL
369919	2013 CU_{210}	—	April 9, 2005	Kitt Peak	Spacewatch	·	1.6 km	MPC · JPL
369920	2013 CJ_{217}	—	January 13, 2008	Kitt Peak	Spacewatch	PAD	1.6 km	MPC · JPL
369921	2013 EN_{34}	—	August 4, 2005	Palomar	NEAT	AGN	1.4 km	MPC · JPL
369922	2013 EV_{35}	—	August 31, 2005	Kitt Peak	Spacewatch	TIR	2.8 km	MPC · JPL
369923	2013 EX_{36}	—	November 8, 2007	Catalina	CSS	·	1.6 km	MPC · JPL
369924	2013 ER_{39}	—	December 11, 2002	Mount Graham	Ryan, W. H., Stewart, L.	·	2.4 km	MPC · JPL
369925	2013 EZ_{56}	—	February 25, 2007	Kitt Peak	Spacewatch	·	3.4 km	MPC · JPL
369926	2013 EP_{80}	—	January 8, 2002	Kitt Peak	Spacewatch	·	3.6 km	MPC · JPL
369927	2013 EL_{86}	—	November 6, 2005	Catalina	CSS	·	5.8 km	MPC · JPL
369928	2013 EZ_{91}	—	January 12, 2004	Palomar	NEAT	·	2.0 km	MPC · JPL
369929	2013 ER_{97}	—	April 1, 2005	Kitt Peak	Spacewatch	·	1.4 km	MPC · JPL
369930	2013 EE_{99}	—	August 31, 2000	Kitt Peak	Spacewatch	NAE	2.7 km	MPC · JPL
369931	2013 EZ_{99}	—	September 7, 2004	Kitt Peak	Spacewatch	·	3.0 km	MPC · JPL
369932	2013 EH_{110}	—	May 4, 2008	Kitt Peak	Spacewatch	·	2.9 km	MPC · JPL
369933	2013 EG_{114}	—	March 31, 2009	Mount Lemmon	Mount Lemmon Survey	·	2.3 km	MPC · JPL
369934	2013 EY_{126}	—	September 16, 2006	Catalina	CSS	H	650 m	MPC · JPL
369935	2013 GQ_{7}	—	May 7, 2005	Mount Lemmon	Mount Lemmon Survey	·	930 m	MPC · JPL
369936	2013 GM_{27}	—	April 13, 2004	Kitt Peak	Spacewatch	·	2.4 km	MPC · JPL
369937	2013 GX_{37}	—	November 2, 1997	Kitt Peak	Spacewatch	·	2.6 km	MPC · JPL
369938	2013 GV_{54}	—	July 12, 2001	Palomar	NEAT	·	1.5 km	MPC · JPL
369939	2013 GL_{61}	—	April 21, 1998	Socorro	LINEAR	·	1.4 km	MPC · JPL
369940	2013 GX_{71}	—	April 14, 2007	Catalina	CSS	T_{j} (2.99) · (895)	5.3 km	MPC · JPL
369941	2013 GW_{72}	—	April 10, 2002	Palomar	NEAT	·	3.1 km	MPC · JPL
369942	2013 GQ_{81}	—	August 28, 2006	Kitt Peak	Spacewatch	·	1.9 km	MPC · JPL
369943	2013 GB_{88}	—	March 12, 2008	Mount Lemmon	Mount Lemmon Survey	·	2.4 km	MPC · JPL
369944	2013 GM_{88}	—	December 6, 2007	Catalina	CSS	·	3.6 km	MPC · JPL
369945	2013 GY_{95}	—	November 4, 2004	Catalina	CSS	·	4.0 km	MPC · JPL
369946	2013 GW_{98}	—	October 25, 2005	Kitt Peak	Spacewatch	EOS	2.1 km	MPC · JPL
369947	2013 GA_{110}	—	September 17, 2004	Socorro	LINEAR	·	3.8 km	MPC · JPL
369948	2013 GW_{111}	—	March 2, 2009	Kitt Peak	Spacewatch	EUN	1.3 km	MPC · JPL
369949	2013 HW	—	May 12, 2002	Palomar	NEAT	TIR	4.3 km	MPC · JPL
369950	2013 HJ_{2}	—	May 24, 2006	Mount Lemmon	Mount Lemmon Survey	·	1.4 km	MPC · JPL
369951	2013 HH_{15}	—	November 23, 2006	Mount Lemmon	Mount Lemmon Survey	·	2.4 km	MPC · JPL
369952	2013 HF_{41}	—	February 10, 2002	Socorro	LINEAR	·	810 m	MPC · JPL
369953	2013 JK_{16}	—	August 4, 2003	Kitt Peak	Spacewatch	VER	3.1 km	MPC · JPL
369954	2013 JO_{35}	—	August 27, 2005	Palomar	NEAT	·	2.4 km	MPC · JPL
369955	2013 MK_{3}	—	November 30, 2003	Kitt Peak	Spacewatch	·	1.0 km	MPC · JPL
369956	6241 P-L	—	September 24, 1960	Palomar	C. J. van Houten, I. van Houten-Groeneveld, T. Gehrels	·	2.8 km	MPC · JPL
369957	1993 TX_{35}	—	October 11, 1993	La Silla	E. W. Elst	·	820 m	MPC · JPL
369958	1993 TV_{45}	—	October 9, 1993	La Silla	E. W. Elst	·	1.2 km	MPC · JPL
369959	1994 RW_{8}	—	September 12, 1994	Kitt Peak	Spacewatch	·	2.2 km	MPC · JPL
369960	1994 RC_{9}	—	September 12, 1994	Kitt Peak	Spacewatch	KOR	1.2 km	MPC · JPL
369961	1994 SL_{12}	—	September 5, 1994	Kitt Peak	Spacewatch	·	1.6 km	MPC · JPL
369962	1994 UY_{8}	—	October 28, 1994	Kitt Peak	Spacewatch	·	3.2 km	MPC · JPL
369963	1995 OE_{3}	—	July 22, 1995	Kitt Peak	Spacewatch	·	2.4 km	MPC · JPL
369964	1995 SY_{31}	—	September 21, 1995	Kitt Peak	Spacewatch	·	750 m	MPC · JPL
369965	1995 SA_{87}	—	September 25, 1995	Kitt Peak	Spacewatch	·	740 m	MPC · JPL
369966	1995 UD_{21}	—	October 19, 1995	Kitt Peak	Spacewatch	MAS	690 m	MPC · JPL
369967	1995 UP_{21}	—	October 19, 1995	Kitt Peak	Spacewatch	MRX	930 m	MPC · JPL
369968	1995 UN_{24}	—	October 19, 1995	Kitt Peak	Spacewatch	·	1.3 km	MPC · JPL
369969	1995 WR_{11}	—	November 16, 1995	Kitt Peak	Spacewatch	·	2.1 km	MPC · JPL
369970	1996 AS_{18}	—	January 14, 1996	Kitt Peak	Spacewatch	V	660 m	MPC · JPL
369971	1996 GU_{5}	—	April 11, 1996	Kitt Peak	Spacewatch	·	2.5 km	MPC · JPL
369972	1996 RT_{14}	—	September 11, 1996	Kitt Peak	Spacewatch	·	1.2 km	MPC · JPL
369973	1996 SE_{1}	—	September 17, 1996	Kitt Peak	Spacewatch	·	1.2 km	MPC · JPL
369974	1996 TV_{35}	—	October 11, 1996	Kitt Peak	Spacewatch	·	940 m	MPC · JPL
369975	1996 XZ_{9}	—	December 1, 1996	Kitt Peak	Spacewatch	·	1.5 km	MPC · JPL
369976	1997 AB_{10}	—	January 3, 1997	Kitt Peak	Spacewatch	·	1.8 km	MPC · JPL
369977	1997 JC_{11}	—	May 9, 1997	Kitt Peak	Spacewatch	L5	10 km	MPC · JPL
369978	1997 SW_{3}	—	September 23, 1997	Kitt Peak	Spacewatch	·	1.7 km	MPC · JPL
369979	1997 SV_{5}	—	September 23, 1997	Kitt Peak	Spacewatch	·	3.1 km	MPC · JPL
369980	1997 TQ_{11}	—	October 7, 1997	Kitt Peak	Spacewatch	3:2	5.8 km	MPC · JPL
369981	1997 WP_{4}	—	November 20, 1997	Kitt Peak	Spacewatch	·	1.3 km	MPC · JPL
369982	1998 BL_{10}	—	January 20, 1998	Mount Hopkins	C. W. Hergenrother	·	2.3 km	MPC · JPL
369983	1998 QB_{28}	—	August 26, 1998	Kitt Peak	Spacewatch	AMO	330 m	MPC · JPL
369984	1998 QR_{52}	—	August 27, 1998	Socorro	LINEAR	APO · slow	570 m	MPC · JPL
369985	1998 RK_{81}	—	September 15, 1998	Kitt Peak	Spacewatch	·	1.0 km	MPC · JPL
369986	1998 SO	—	September 16, 1998	Kitt Peak	Spacewatch	ATE	290 m	MPC · JPL
369987	1998 SA_{51}	—	September 26, 1998	Kitt Peak	Spacewatch	3:2 · SHU	4.6 km	MPC · JPL
369988	1998 SO_{105}	—	September 26, 1998	Socorro	LINEAR	·	1.2 km	MPC · JPL
369989	1998 WH_{44}	—	November 17, 1998	La Palma	A. Fitzsimmons	·	1.2 km	MPC · JPL
369990	1999 AE_{11}	—	January 7, 1999	Kitt Peak	Spacewatch	·	1.1 km	MPC · JPL
369991	1999 AB_{16}	—	January 9, 1999	Kitt Peak	Spacewatch	·	1.2 km	MPC · JPL
369992	1999 EF_{6}	—	March 13, 1999	Kitt Peak	Spacewatch	H	650 m	MPC · JPL
369993	1999 RO_{37}	—	September 11, 1999	Socorro	LINEAR	·	1.4 km	MPC · JPL
369994	1999 RQ_{55}	—	September 7, 1999	Socorro	LINEAR	·	850 m	MPC · JPL
369995	1999 RV_{195}	—	September 8, 1999	Socorro	LINEAR	·	3.3 km	MPC · JPL
369996	1999 TT_{7}	—	October 2, 1999	Socorro	LINEAR	·	2.5 km	MPC · JPL
369997	1999 TT_{23}	—	October 4, 1999	Kitt Peak	Spacewatch	AGN	1.2 km	MPC · JPL
369998	1999 TE_{53}	—	October 6, 1999	Kitt Peak	Spacewatch	·	2.5 km	MPC · JPL
369999	1999 TR_{60}	—	October 7, 1999	Kitt Peak	Spacewatch	·	770 m	MPC · JPL
370000	1999 TR_{126}	—	October 15, 1999	Socorro	LINEAR	·	2.2 km	MPC · JPL

back to top

== See also ==
- Meanings of minor-planet names: 369001–370000
