= Meanings of minor-planet names: 369001–370000 =

As minor planet discoveries are confirmed, they are given a permanent number by the IAU's Minor Planet Center (MPC), and the discoverers can then submit names for them, following the IAU's naming conventions. The list below concerns those minor planets in the specified number-range that have received names, and explains the meanings of those names.

Official naming citations of newly named small Solar System bodies are approved and published in a bulletin by IAU's Working Group for Small Bodies Nomenclature (WGSBN). Before May 2021, citations were published in MPC's Minor Planet Circulars for many decades. Recent citations can also be found on the JPL Small-Body Database (SBDB). Until his death in 2016, German astronomer Lutz D. Schmadel compiled these citations into the Dictionary of Minor Planet Names (DMP) and regularly updated the collection.

Based on Paul Herget's The Names of the Minor Planets, Schmadel also researched the unclear origin of numerous asteroids, most of which had been named prior to World War II. This article incorporates text from this source, which is in the public domain: SBDB New namings may only be added to this list below after official publication as the preannouncement of names is condemned. The WGSBN publishes a comprehensive guideline for the naming rules of non-cometary small Solar System bodies.

== 369001–369100 ==
Named minor planet	Provisional	This minor planet was named for...	Ref · Catalog
369010 Ira	2007 OK_{2}	Irina Rumyantseva (b. 1969), an engineer at the Crimean Astrophysical Observatory.	IAU · 369010
369088 Marcus	2008 GG_{44}	Ella Marcus (1909–1982) was a Romanian astronomer who studied at the University of Bucharest and the Sorbonne.	JPL · 369088

== 369101–369200 ==
back to top

Named minor planet	Provisional	This minor planet was named for...	Ref · Catalog
369134 Mariareiche	2008 RG_{79}	Maria Reiche (1903–1998) was a German-born Peruvian scientist who studied the Nazca Lines of Peru. Her life's work was documenting and protecting the lines, as well as disseminating information about them.	IAU · 369134

== 369201–369300 ==
back to top

Named minor planet	Provisional	This minor planet was named for...	Ref · Catalog
369297 Nazca	2009 SW_{20}	The Nazca Lines are a series of ancient geoglyphs, located in the Nazca Desert of Peru. Created between 500 BCE and 500 CE, the site was designated as a UNESCO World Heritage Site in 1994.	IAU · 369297

== 369301–369400 ==
back to top

Named minor planet	Provisional	This minor planet was named for...	Ref · Catalog
There are no named minor planets in this number range

== 369401–369500 ==
back to top

Named minor planet	Provisional	This minor planet was named for...	Ref · Catalog
369423 Quintegr'al	2009 WV_{195}	Quintegr'al is a brass quintet established by five students of the Paris Conservatoire National Supérieur de Musique et de Danse in 2012. It consists of Guillaume Fattet (trumpet), Fabien Verwaerde (trumpet), Guillaume Merlin (French horn), Nicolas Cunin (trombone) and Florian Schuegraf (tuba).	JPL · 369423

== 369501–369600 ==
back to top

Named minor planet	Provisional	This minor planet was named for...	Ref · Catalog
There are no named minor planets in this number range

== 369601–369700 ==
back to top

Named minor planet	Provisional	This minor planet was named for...	Ref · Catalog
There are no named minor planets in this number range

== 369701–369800 ==
back to top

Named minor planet	Provisional	This minor planet was named for...	Ref · Catalog
There are no named minor planets in this number range

== 369801–369900 ==
back to top

Named minor planet	Provisional	This minor planet was named for...	Ref · Catalog
There are no named minor planets in this number range

== 369901–370000 ==
back to top

Named minor planet	Provisional	This minor planet was named for...	Ref · Catalog
There are no named minor planets in this number range

back to top

Preceded by 368,001–369,000	Meanings of minor-planet names List of minor planets: 369,001–370,000	Succeeded by 370,001–371,000
