= (369623) 2011 DY5 =

Main-belt asteroid

(369623) 2011 DY_{5}
Discovery
- Discovered by: C. Demeautis; Jean-Marie Lopez
- Discovery site: Pises Obs.
- Discovery date: 30 August 2008

Designations
- Alternative designations: 2008 QZ_{41}
- Minor planet category: main-belt · (outer); Tirela

Orbital characteristics
- Epoch 23 March 2018 (JD 2458200.5)
- Uncertainty parameter 0
- Observation arc: 8.67 yr (3,168 d)
- Aphelion: 3.6022 AU
- Perihelion: 2.6289 AU
- Semi-major axis: 3.1155 AU
- Eccentricity: 0.1562
- Orbital period (sidereal): 5.50 yr (2,009 d)
- Mean anomaly: 108.05°
- Mean motion: 0° 10^{m} 45.12^{s} / day
- Inclination: 17.608°
- Longitude of ascending node: 168.34°
- Argument of perihelion: 340.61°

Physical characteristics
- Mean diameter: 3.2 km (est. at 0.07)
- Absolute magnitude (H): 16.0 · 16.1

(369623) 2011 DY_{5} is a Tirela asteroid from the outer regions of the asteroid belt, approximately 3.2 kilometers (2.0 miles) in diameter. It was discovered on 30 August 2008, by French amateur astronomers Christophe Demeautis and Jean-Marie Lopez at the Pises Observatory in southern France.

== Orbit and classification ==
2011 DY_{5} is a member of the Tirela family, a large asteroid family, also known as the Klumpkea family, named after the largest members 1040 Klumpkea and 1400 Tirela. The family consists of more than a thousand members and may be further divided into 8 different parts.

It orbits the Sun in the outer asteroid belt at a distance of 2.6–3.6 AU once every 5 years and 6 months (2,009 days; semi-major axis of 3.12 AU). Its orbit has an eccentricity of 0.16 and an inclination of 18° with respect to the ecliptic. The body's observation arc begins with its official discovery observation as 2008 QZ_{41} at Pises in August 2008.

== Physical characteristics ==
Based on a generic magnitude-to-diameter conversion, 2011 DY_{5} measures 3.2 kilometers in diameter for an absolute magnitude of 16.0 and an assumed albedo of 0.07, which is a typical value for a Tirela asteroid. As of 2018, no rotational lightcurve has been obtained from photometric observations. The asteroid's rotation period, poles and shape remain unknown.

== Numbering and naming ==
This minor planet was numbered by the Minor Planet Center on 21 August 2013 (M.P.C. 84643). As of 2018, it has not been named.
