= List of minor planets: 367001–368000 =

The following is a partial list of minor planets, running from minor-planet number 367001 through 368000, inclusive. The primary data for this and other partial lists is based on JPL's "Small-Body Orbital Elements" and data available from the Minor Planet Center. Critical list information is also provided by the MPC, unless otherwise specified from Lowell Observatory. A detailed description of the table's columns and additional sources are given on the main page including a complete list of every page in this series, and a statistical break-up on the dynamical classification of minor planets.

Also see the summary list of all named bodies in numerical and alphabetical order, and the corresponding naming citations for the number range of this particular list. New namings may only be added to this list after official publication, as the preannouncement of names is condemned by the Working Group for Small Bodies Nomenclature of the International Astronomical Union.

Near-Earth obj.	MBA (inner)	MBA (outer)	Centaur
Mars-crosser	MBA (middle)	Jupiter trojan	Trans-Neptunian obj.
Unclassified

== 367001–367100 ==
Designation			Discovery			Properties		Ref
Permanent	Provisional	Named after	Date	Site	Discoverer(s)	Category	Diam.	Ref
367001	2006 AQ_{10}	—	January 4, 2006	Catalina	CSS	·	4.1 km	MPC · JPL
367002	2006 AG_{15}	—	December 25, 2005	Mount Lemmon	Mount Lemmon Survey	·	1.8 km	MPC · JPL
367003	2006 AU_{15}	—	January 2, 2006	Catalina	CSS	·	1.6 km	MPC · JPL
367004	2006 AK_{56}	—	January 7, 2006	Mount Lemmon	Mount Lemmon Survey	·	2.5 km	MPC · JPL
367005	2006 AL_{61}	—	January 5, 2006	Kitt Peak	Spacewatch	EOS	2.4 km	MPC · JPL
367006	2006 AM_{67}	—	December 28, 2005	Kitt Peak	Spacewatch	EOS	2.3 km	MPC · JPL
367007	2006 AT_{72}	—	November 25, 2005	Mount Lemmon	Mount Lemmon Survey	·	2.8 km	MPC · JPL
367008	2006 AA_{78}	—	January 8, 2006	Kitt Peak	Spacewatch	·	2.4 km	MPC · JPL
367009	2006 AT_{105}	—	January 8, 2006	Mount Lemmon	Mount Lemmon Survey	EOS	2.3 km	MPC · JPL
367010	2006 AG_{106}	—	January 5, 2006	Mount Lemmon	Mount Lemmon Survey	·	1.7 km	MPC · JPL
367011	2006 BK_{36}	—	January 23, 2006	Kitt Peak	Spacewatch	·	1.9 km	MPC · JPL
367012	2006 BB_{56}	—	January 23, 2006	Mount Lemmon	Mount Lemmon Survey	·	2.8 km	MPC · JPL
367013	2006 BA_{96}	—	January 26, 2006	Kitt Peak	Spacewatch	·	2.2 km	MPC · JPL
367014	2006 BA_{102}	—	January 6, 2006	Mount Lemmon	Mount Lemmon Survey	(5651)	4.0 km	MPC · JPL
367015	2006 BO_{102}	—	January 23, 2006	Mount Lemmon	Mount Lemmon Survey	·	3.2 km	MPC · JPL
367016	2006 BR_{106}	—	January 25, 2006	Kitt Peak	Spacewatch	·	1.9 km	MPC · JPL
367017	2006 BN_{113}	—	January 25, 2006	Kitt Peak	Spacewatch	·	2.7 km	MPC · JPL
367018	2006 BH_{120}	—	January 8, 2006	Mount Lemmon	Mount Lemmon Survey	·	2.1 km	MPC · JPL
367019	2006 BV_{121}	—	January 26, 2006	Mount Lemmon	Mount Lemmon Survey	·	1.8 km	MPC · JPL
367020	2006 BF_{130}	—	January 26, 2006	Kitt Peak	Spacewatch	·	2.9 km	MPC · JPL
367021	2006 BW_{134}	—	January 27, 2006	Mount Lemmon	Mount Lemmon Survey	EOS	1.6 km	MPC · JPL
367022	2006 BR_{174}	—	January 27, 2006	Kitt Peak	Spacewatch	TRE	2.6 km	MPC · JPL
367023	2006 BP_{177}	—	January 27, 2006	Mount Lemmon	Mount Lemmon Survey	·	2.8 km	MPC · JPL
367024	2006 BJ_{194}	—	January 30, 2006	Kitt Peak	Spacewatch	·	1.2 km	MPC · JPL
367025	2006 BB_{255}	—	January 23, 2006	Mount Lemmon	Mount Lemmon Survey	·	2.2 km	MPC · JPL
367026	2006 BX_{274}	—	January 23, 2006	Mount Lemmon	Mount Lemmon Survey	·	3.5 km	MPC · JPL
367027	2006 BY_{275}	—	January 23, 2006	Kitt Peak	Spacewatch	·	2.9 km	MPC · JPL
367028	2006 BF_{276}	—	January 30, 2006	Kitt Peak	Spacewatch	·	590 m	MPC · JPL
367029	2006 CC	—	February 1, 2006	7300	W. K. Y. Yeung	·	4.3 km	MPC · JPL
367030	2006 CC_{10}	—	February 4, 2006	Las Cruces	Dixon, D. S.	·	2.0 km	MPC · JPL
367031	2006 CJ_{11}	—	February 1, 2006	Kitt Peak	Spacewatch	·	2.1 km	MPC · JPL
367032	2006 CF_{16}	—	February 1, 2006	Mount Lemmon	Mount Lemmon Survey	·	980 m	MPC · JPL
367033	2006 CV_{58}	—	February 6, 2006	Mount Lemmon	Mount Lemmon Survey	·	1.6 km	MPC · JPL
367034	2006 CR_{61}	—	February 3, 2006	Anderson Mesa	LONEOS	T_{j} (2.99) · EUP	4.2 km	MPC · JPL
367035	2006 DV_{3}	—	February 20, 2006	Catalina	CSS	·	5.1 km	MPC · JPL
367036	2006 DP_{18}	—	January 31, 2006	Kitt Peak	Spacewatch	EOS	1.7 km	MPC · JPL
367037	2006 DT_{79}	—	February 24, 2006	Kitt Peak	Spacewatch	·	640 m	MPC · JPL
367038	2006 DD_{125}	—	January 30, 2006	Kitt Peak	Spacewatch	·	3.4 km	MPC · JPL
367039	2006 DF_{130}	—	February 25, 2006	Kitt Peak	Spacewatch	·	660 m	MPC · JPL
367040	2006 DG_{178}	—	February 27, 2006	Mount Lemmon	Mount Lemmon Survey	·	620 m	MPC · JPL
367041	2006 DW_{195}	—	January 28, 2006	Anderson Mesa	LONEOS	LIX	4.4 km	MPC · JPL
367042	2006 EH_{5}	—	March 2, 2006	Kitt Peak	Spacewatch	·	850 m	MPC · JPL
367043	2006 EE_{10}	—	March 2, 2006	Kitt Peak	Spacewatch	THM	2.6 km	MPC · JPL
367044	2006 ER_{10}	—	March 2, 2006	Kitt Peak	Spacewatch	·	2.8 km	MPC · JPL
367045	2006 EC_{35}	—	March 3, 2006	Kitt Peak	Spacewatch	·	4.3 km	MPC · JPL
367046	2006 FR_{14}	—	March 23, 2006	Kitt Peak	Spacewatch	·	690 m	MPC · JPL
367047	2006 FL_{36}	—	March 26, 2006	Pla D'Arguines	D'Arguines, Pla	·	700 m	MPC · JPL
367048	2006 FV_{43}	—	April 6, 1995	Kitt Peak	Spacewatch	·	3.0 km	MPC · JPL
367049	2006 GO_{47}	—	April 9, 2006	Kitt Peak	Spacewatch	·	2.8 km	MPC · JPL
367050	2006 HW_{12}	—	April 19, 2006	Kitt Peak	Spacewatch	·	820 m	MPC · JPL
367051	2006 HR_{31}	—	April 19, 2006	Kitt Peak	Spacewatch	·	2.7 km	MPC · JPL
367052	2006 JO_{23}	—	May 3, 2006	Mount Lemmon	Mount Lemmon Survey	·	630 m	MPC · JPL
367053	2006 JA_{43}	—	May 2, 2006	Mount Lemmon	Mount Lemmon Survey	V	550 m	MPC · JPL
367054	2006 JL_{45}	—	May 8, 2006	Mount Lemmon	Mount Lemmon Survey	(883)	670 m	MPC · JPL
367055	2006 JO_{65}	—	May 1, 2006	Kitt Peak	M. W. Buie	·	1.7 km	MPC · JPL
367056	2006 KO_{30}	—	May 20, 2006	Kitt Peak	Spacewatch	·	710 m	MPC · JPL
367057	2006 KG_{42}	—	May 20, 2006	Kitt Peak	Spacewatch	·	630 m	MPC · JPL
367058	2006 KU_{47}	—	May 21, 2006	Kitt Peak	Spacewatch	·	620 m	MPC · JPL
367059	2006 KD_{52}	—	May 21, 2006	Kitt Peak	Spacewatch	·	770 m	MPC · JPL
367060	2006 KK_{55}	—	May 21, 2006	Kitt Peak	Spacewatch	·	610 m	MPC · JPL
367061	2006 KM_{69}	—	May 22, 2006	Kitt Peak	Spacewatch	CYB	4.3 km	MPC · JPL
367062	2006 KA_{88}	—	May 24, 2006	Kitt Peak	Spacewatch	·	490 m	MPC · JPL
367063	2006 MT_{5}	—	June 17, 2006	Kitt Peak	Spacewatch	·	930 m	MPC · JPL
367064	2006 MH_{7}	—	June 18, 2006	Kitt Peak	Spacewatch	·	1.2 km	MPC · JPL
367065	2006 MD_{10}	—	June 21, 2006	Kitt Peak	Spacewatch	·	870 m	MPC · JPL
367066	2006 OP_{10}	—	July 25, 2006	Ottmarsheim	C. Rinner	·	1.0 km	MPC · JPL
367067	2006 OJ_{20}	—	July 31, 2006	Siding Spring	SSS	·	910 m	MPC · JPL
367068	2006 PE_{8}	—	August 12, 2006	Lulin	Lin, H.-C., Q. Ye	·	1.2 km	MPC · JPL
367069	2006 PK_{9}	—	August 13, 2006	Palomar	NEAT	·	1 km	MPC · JPL
367070	2006 PS_{10}	—	August 13, 2006	Palomar	NEAT	·	870 m	MPC · JPL
367071	2006 PK_{15}	—	August 15, 2006	Palomar	NEAT	NYS	880 m	MPC · JPL
367072	2006 PV_{19}	—	August 13, 2006	Palomar	NEAT	·	1.0 km	MPC · JPL
367073	2006 PZ_{19}	—	August 14, 2006	Palomar	NEAT	·	1.4 km	MPC · JPL
367074	2006 PA_{21}	—	August 15, 2006	Palomar	NEAT	·	1.1 km	MPC · JPL
367075	2006 PK_{21}	—	August 15, 2006	Palomar	NEAT	·	1.1 km	MPC · JPL
367076	2006 PA_{25}	—	August 13, 2006	Palomar	NEAT	NYS	1.2 km	MPC · JPL
367077	2006 PY_{28}	—	August 15, 2006	Siding Spring	SSS	PHO	1.2 km	MPC · JPL
367078	2006 PH_{29}	—	August 12, 2006	Palomar	NEAT	·	740 m	MPC · JPL
367079	2006 QY_{1}	—	August 17, 2006	Palomar	NEAT	·	1.2 km	MPC · JPL
367080	2006 QV_{4}	—	August 19, 2006	Pla D'Arguines	R. Ferrando	·	1.3 km	MPC · JPL
367081	2006 QT_{6}	—	August 17, 2006	Palomar	NEAT	·	1.4 km	MPC · JPL
367082	2006 QC_{8}	—	August 19, 2006	Kitt Peak	Spacewatch	·	2.7 km	MPC · JPL
367083	2006 QS_{9}	—	July 21, 2006	Mount Lemmon	Mount Lemmon Survey	·	1.3 km	MPC · JPL
367084	2006 QT_{13}	—	May 26, 2006	Mount Lemmon	Mount Lemmon Survey	·	980 m	MPC · JPL
367085	2006 QY_{31}	—	May 26, 2006	Mount Lemmon	Mount Lemmon Survey	·	1.2 km	MPC · JPL
367086	2006 QY_{42}	—	August 17, 2006	Palomar	NEAT	·	1.4 km	MPC · JPL
367087	2006 QE_{43}	—	August 18, 2006	Kitt Peak	Spacewatch	·	1.8 km	MPC · JPL
367088	2006 QE_{53}	—	August 23, 2006	Palomar	NEAT	MAS	680 m	MPC · JPL
367089	2006 QZ_{79}	—	August 24, 2006	Socorro	LINEAR	HIL · 3:2	6.3 km	MPC · JPL
367090	2006 QH_{91}	—	July 21, 2006	Catalina	CSS	·	1.3 km	MPC · JPL
367091	2006 QO_{95}	—	August 16, 2006	Palomar	NEAT	·	1.2 km	MPC · JPL
367092	2006 QF_{97}	—	August 19, 2006	Kitt Peak	Spacewatch	·	1.2 km	MPC · JPL
367093	2006 QR_{112}	—	August 23, 2006	Palomar	NEAT	·	1.5 km	MPC · JPL
367094	2006 QR_{131}	—	August 22, 2006	Palomar	NEAT	V	570 m	MPC · JPL
367095	2006 QU_{165}	—	August 29, 2006	Catalina	CSS	·	1.2 km	MPC · JPL
367096	2006 QK_{187}	—	August 27, 2006	Anderson Mesa	LONEOS	·	1.3 km	MPC · JPL
367097	2006 QN_{187}	—	August 28, 2006	Anderson Mesa	LONEOS	·	1.2 km	MPC · JPL
367098	2006 RP_{4}	—	September 12, 2006	Catalina	CSS	·	1.2 km	MPC · JPL
367099	2006 RV_{5}	—	September 14, 2006	Kitt Peak	Spacewatch	NYS	1.2 km	MPC · JPL
367100	2006 RC_{10}	—	September 13, 2006	Palomar	NEAT	·	1.4 km	MPC · JPL

== 367101–367200 ==
back to top

Designation			Discovery			Properties		Ref
Permanent	Provisional	Named after	Date	Site	Discoverer(s)	Category	Diam.	Ref
367101	2006 RX_{11}	—	September 13, 2006	Palomar	NEAT	3:2	6.4 km	MPC · JPL
367102	2006 RD_{16}	—	September 14, 2006	Palomar	NEAT	NYS	1.1 km	MPC · JPL
367103	2006 RC_{20}	—	September 15, 2006	Kitt Peak	Spacewatch	·	1.0 km	MPC · JPL
367104	2006 RM_{21}	—	September 15, 2006	Kitt Peak	Spacewatch	MAS	690 m	MPC · JPL
367105	2006 RK_{22}	—	September 14, 2006	Mayhill	Lowe, A.	·	1.6 km	MPC · JPL
367106	2006 RR_{30}	—	September 15, 2006	Kitt Peak	Spacewatch	·	1.4 km	MPC · JPL
367107	2006 RK_{40}	—	September 13, 2006	Palomar	NEAT	MAS	920 m	MPC · JPL
367108	2006 RX_{55}	—	September 14, 2006	Kitt Peak	Spacewatch	·	800 m	MPC · JPL
367109	2006 RQ_{77}	—	September 15, 2006	Kitt Peak	Spacewatch	·	960 m	MPC · JPL
367110	2006 RB_{89}	—	September 15, 2006	Kitt Peak	Spacewatch	·	980 m	MPC · JPL
367111	2006 SQ_{17}	—	September 17, 2006	Kitt Peak	Spacewatch	NYS	1.3 km	MPC · JPL
367112	2006 ST_{24}	—	September 16, 2006	Catalina	CSS	·	1.0 km	MPC · JPL
367113	2006 SM_{26}	—	September 16, 2006	Catalina	CSS	V	740 m	MPC · JPL
367114	2006 SC_{33}	—	September 17, 2006	Kitt Peak	Spacewatch	·	1.1 km	MPC · JPL
367115	2006 SU_{52}	—	September 19, 2006	Anderson Mesa	LONEOS	·	840 m	MPC · JPL
367116	2006 SJ_{65}	—	September 17, 2006	Kitt Peak	Spacewatch	V	640 m	MPC · JPL
367117	2006 SD_{74}	—	July 21, 2006	Mount Lemmon	Mount Lemmon Survey	·	1.1 km	MPC · JPL
367118	2006 SF_{74}	—	September 19, 2006	Kitt Peak	Spacewatch	3:2 · SHU	6.1 km	MPC · JPL
367119	2006 SX_{91}	—	September 18, 2006	Kitt Peak	Spacewatch	MAS	690 m	MPC · JPL
367120	2006 SX_{99}	—	September 18, 2006	Kitt Peak	Spacewatch	MAS	770 m	MPC · JPL
367121	2006 SH_{109}	—	September 19, 2006	Kitt Peak	Spacewatch	NYS	1.1 km	MPC · JPL
367122	2006 SC_{128}	—	September 17, 2006	Kitt Peak	Spacewatch	3:2	5.6 km	MPC · JPL
367123	2006 SS_{129}	—	August 29, 2006	Anderson Mesa	LONEOS	·	870 m	MPC · JPL
367124	2006 SE_{131}	—	September 25, 2006	Eskridge	Farpoint	MAS	610 m	MPC · JPL
367125	2006 SB_{145}	—	September 19, 2006	Kitt Peak	Spacewatch	·	1.5 km	MPC · JPL
367126	2006 SE_{183}	—	September 18, 2006	Kitt Peak	Spacewatch	·	1.1 km	MPC · JPL
367127	2006 SP_{202}	—	September 25, 2006	Kitt Peak	Spacewatch	3:2	6.4 km	MPC · JPL
367128	2006 SO_{246}	—	September 26, 2006	Mount Lemmon	Mount Lemmon Survey	3:2	5.6 km	MPC · JPL
367129	2006 ST_{306}	—	September 27, 2006	Mount Lemmon	Mount Lemmon Survey	NYS	1.3 km	MPC · JPL
367130	2006 SF_{314}	—	September 17, 2006	Kitt Peak	Spacewatch	MAS	910 m	MPC · JPL
367131	2006 SQ_{355}	—	September 30, 2006	Catalina	CSS	·	1.2 km	MPC · JPL
367132	2006 SM_{361}	—	September 30, 2006	Mount Lemmon	Mount Lemmon Survey	·	1.3 km	MPC · JPL
367133	2006 SQ_{403}	—	September 28, 2006	Catalina	CSS	·	1.5 km	MPC · JPL
367134	2006 TZ_{7}	—	October 11, 2006	Palomar	NEAT	H	570 m	MPC · JPL
367135	2006 TX_{29}	—	October 12, 2006	Kitt Peak	Spacewatch	3:2 · SHU	5.4 km	MPC · JPL
367136	2006 TK_{31}	—	October 12, 2006	Kitt Peak	Spacewatch	MAS	610 m	MPC · JPL
367137	2006 TS_{43}	—	October 12, 2006	Kitt Peak	Spacewatch	·	1.4 km	MPC · JPL
367138	2006 TX_{47}	—	October 12, 2006	Kitt Peak	Spacewatch	·	1.2 km	MPC · JPL
367139	2006 TL_{68}	—	October 11, 2006	Palomar	NEAT	3:2 · SHU	5.9 km	MPC · JPL
367140	2006 TN_{81}	—	October 4, 2006	Mount Lemmon	Mount Lemmon Survey	V	630 m	MPC · JPL
367141	2006 TX_{95}	—	October 12, 2006	Kitt Peak	Spacewatch	H	440 m	MPC · JPL
367142	2006 TT_{96}	—	October 12, 2006	Palomar	NEAT	(1547)	2.1 km	MPC · JPL
367143	2006 TD_{102}	—	October 15, 2006	Kitt Peak	Spacewatch	NYS	1.1 km	MPC · JPL
367144	2006 UM_{23}	—	October 16, 2006	Kitt Peak	Spacewatch	·	1.2 km	MPC · JPL
367145	2006 UD_{46}	—	September 30, 2006	Mount Lemmon	Mount Lemmon Survey	NYS	1.1 km	MPC · JPL
367146	2006 UE_{49}	—	September 17, 2006	Catalina	CSS	·	1.6 km	MPC · JPL
367147	2006 UX_{61}	—	August 29, 2006	Catalina	CSS	·	1.2 km	MPC · JPL
367148	2006 UZ_{64}	—	October 16, 2006	Kitt Peak	Spacewatch	·	1.1 km	MPC · JPL
367149	2006 UU_{70}	—	October 16, 2006	Catalina	CSS	·	1.2 km	MPC · JPL
367150	2006 UH_{98}	—	October 18, 2006	Kitt Peak	Spacewatch	NYS	1.4 km	MPC · JPL
367151	2006 UL_{118}	—	October 19, 2006	Kitt Peak	Spacewatch	·	1.7 km	MPC · JPL
367152	2006 UP_{143}	—	October 19, 2006	Palomar	NEAT	ERI	1.4 km	MPC · JPL
367153	2006 UW_{199}	—	October 21, 2006	Catalina	CSS	NYS	1 km	MPC · JPL
367154	2006 UE_{231}	—	October 21, 2006	Palomar	NEAT	·	1.1 km	MPC · JPL
367155	2006 UA_{243}	—	September 14, 2006	Kitt Peak	Spacewatch	·	1.5 km	MPC · JPL
367156	2006 UM_{248}	—	October 27, 2006	Mount Lemmon	Mount Lemmon Survey	·	1.1 km	MPC · JPL
367157	2006 UR_{252}	—	September 27, 2006	Mount Lemmon	Mount Lemmon Survey	·	1.3 km	MPC · JPL
367158	2006 VY_{22}	—	November 10, 2006	Kitt Peak	Spacewatch	MAS	750 m	MPC · JPL
367159	2006 VZ_{29}	—	November 10, 2006	Kitt Peak	Spacewatch	NYS	1.3 km	MPC · JPL
367160	2006 VX_{33}	—	October 27, 2006	Mount Lemmon	Mount Lemmon Survey	·	1.3 km	MPC · JPL
367161	2006 VA_{43}	—	November 13, 2006	Kitt Peak	Spacewatch	·	3.2 km	MPC · JPL
367162	2006 VB_{67}	—	November 11, 2006	Catalina	CSS	MAS	740 m	MPC · JPL
367163	2006 VU_{79}	—	September 28, 2006	Mount Lemmon	Mount Lemmon Survey	·	1.3 km	MPC · JPL
367164	2006 VN_{124}	—	November 14, 2006	Kitt Peak	Spacewatch	·	1.6 km	MPC · JPL
367165	2006 VC_{139}	—	November 1, 2006	Mount Lemmon	Mount Lemmon Survey	·	1.2 km	MPC · JPL
367166	2006 WR_{54}	—	November 16, 2006	Kitt Peak	Spacewatch	EUN	1.6 km	MPC · JPL
367167	2006 WR_{55}	—	October 22, 2006	Mount Lemmon	Mount Lemmon Survey	(5)	1.3 km	MPC · JPL
367168	2006 WZ_{86}	—	November 18, 2006	Socorro	LINEAR	·	3.5 km	MPC · JPL
367169	2006 WT_{123}	—	November 21, 2006	Mount Lemmon	Mount Lemmon Survey	·	2.4 km	MPC · JPL
367170	2006 WQ_{175}	—	November 23, 2006	Mount Lemmon	Mount Lemmon Survey	·	2.2 km	MPC · JPL
367171	2006 WO_{200}	—	November 21, 2006	Mount Lemmon	Mount Lemmon Survey	·	1.6 km	MPC · JPL
367172	2006 XT_{5}	—	December 7, 2006	Palomar	NEAT	(5)	1.2 km	MPC · JPL
367173	2006 XN_{16}	—	December 10, 2006	Kitt Peak	Spacewatch	·	1.3 km	MPC · JPL
367174	2006 XB_{19}	—	December 11, 2006	Kitt Peak	Spacewatch	(5)	1.5 km	MPC · JPL
367175	2006 XP_{25}	—	December 12, 2006	Mount Lemmon	Mount Lemmon Survey	·	1.6 km	MPC · JPL
367176	2006 XK_{26}	—	December 12, 2006	Mount Lemmon	Mount Lemmon Survey	·	3.2 km	MPC · JPL
367177	2006 XG_{27}	—	December 13, 2006	Kitt Peak	Spacewatch	·	1.9 km	MPC · JPL
367178	2006 XF_{35}	—	December 11, 2006	Kitt Peak	Spacewatch	PAD	2.1 km	MPC · JPL
367179	2006 XS_{58}	—	December 1, 2006	Mount Lemmon	Mount Lemmon Survey	·	1.6 km	MPC · JPL
367180	2006 XC_{68}	—	December 15, 2006	Mount Lemmon	Mount Lemmon Survey	·	1.2 km	MPC · JPL
367181	2006 YT	—	December 16, 2006	Kitt Peak	Spacewatch	·	1.1 km	MPC · JPL
367182	2006 YC_{7}	—	December 20, 2006	Palomar	NEAT	MAR	1.4 km	MPC · JPL
367183	2006 YC_{11}	—	December 21, 2006	Kitt Peak	Spacewatch	H	460 m	MPC · JPL
367184	2006 YN_{17}	—	November 15, 2006	Mount Lemmon	Mount Lemmon Survey	·	2.8 km	MPC · JPL
367185	2006 YZ_{25}	—	December 21, 2006	Kitt Peak	Spacewatch	·	1.8 km	MPC · JPL
367186	2006 YR_{34}	—	December 21, 2006	Kitt Peak	Spacewatch	·	930 m	MPC · JPL
367187	2006 YY_{36}	—	November 21, 2006	Mount Lemmon	Mount Lemmon Survey	·	2.2 km	MPC · JPL
367188	2006 YU_{44}	—	December 23, 2006	Piszkéstető	K. Sárneczky	·	2.8 km	MPC · JPL
367189	2006 YD_{46}	—	November 18, 2006	Mount Lemmon	Mount Lemmon Survey	·	2.3 km	MPC · JPL
367190	2006 YR_{48}	—	December 24, 2006	Mount Lemmon	Mount Lemmon Survey	·	2.7 km	MPC · JPL
367191	2007 AL_{10}	—	January 9, 2007	Palomar	NEAT	H	850 m	MPC · JPL
367192	2007 AV_{24}	—	November 28, 2006	Mount Lemmon	Mount Lemmon Survey	(5)	1.5 km	MPC · JPL
367193	2007 AT_{25}	—	January 15, 2007	Anderson Mesa	LONEOS	H	820 m	MPC · JPL
367194	2007 AY_{25}	—	January 15, 2007	Anderson Mesa	LONEOS	HNS	1.7 km	MPC · JPL
367195	2007 AJ_{26}	—	November 21, 2006	Mount Lemmon	Mount Lemmon Survey	·	2.7 km	MPC · JPL
367196	2007 AT_{28}	—	January 10, 2007	Mount Lemmon	Mount Lemmon Survey	·	2.2 km	MPC · JPL
367197	2007 BC_{3}	—	January 21, 2007	Great Shefford	Birtwhistle, P.	(5)	1.5 km	MPC · JPL
367198	2007 BG_{16}	—	January 17, 2007	Kitt Peak	Spacewatch	·	1.7 km	MPC · JPL
367199	2007 BM_{17}	—	January 17, 2007	Palomar	NEAT	·	1.2 km	MPC · JPL
367200	2007 BY_{17}	—	January 17, 2007	Palomar	NEAT	·	1.5 km	MPC · JPL

== 367201–367300 ==
back to top

Designation			Discovery			Properties		Ref
Permanent	Provisional	Named after	Date	Site	Discoverer(s)	Category	Diam.	Ref
367201	2007 BL_{65}	—	January 27, 2007	Mount Lemmon	Mount Lemmon Survey	·	1.9 km	MPC · JPL
367202	2007 CZ_{4}	—	February 6, 2007	Mount Lemmon	Mount Lemmon Survey	·	1.9 km	MPC · JPL
367203	2007 CB_{9}	—	December 24, 2006	Kitt Peak	Spacewatch	GEF	1.2 km	MPC · JPL
367204	2007 CX_{37}	—	February 6, 2007	Mount Lemmon	Mount Lemmon Survey	·	2.5 km	MPC · JPL
367205	2007 CY_{46}	—	November 27, 2006	Mount Lemmon	Mount Lemmon Survey	·	2.0 km	MPC · JPL
367206	2007 CO_{55}	—	February 13, 2007	Mount Lemmon	Mount Lemmon Survey	·	2.0 km	MPC · JPL
367207	2007 CA_{59}	—	September 1, 2005	Palomar	NEAT	·	2.4 km	MPC · JPL
367208	2007 DN_{14}	—	February 17, 2007	Kitt Peak	Spacewatch	·	1.4 km	MPC · JPL
367209	2007 DJ_{16}	—	December 27, 2006	Mount Lemmon	Mount Lemmon Survey	AGN	1.3 km	MPC · JPL
367210	2007 DO_{16}	—	March 24, 2003	Kitt Peak	Spacewatch	·	2.1 km	MPC · JPL
367211	2007 DL_{18}	—	February 17, 2007	Kitt Peak	Spacewatch	·	2.0 km	MPC · JPL
367212	2007 DM_{56}	—	February 21, 2007	Mount Lemmon	Mount Lemmon Survey	·	2.1 km	MPC · JPL
367213	2007 DV_{68}	—	February 21, 2007	Kitt Peak	Spacewatch	·	2.2 km	MPC · JPL
367214	2007 DL_{91}	—	February 23, 2007	Mount Lemmon	Mount Lemmon Survey	·	2.2 km	MPC · JPL
367215	2007 DQ_{113}	—	February 21, 2007	Mount Lemmon	Mount Lemmon Survey	·	2.4 km	MPC · JPL
367216	2007 EC_{16}	—	March 9, 2007	Palomar	NEAT	·	2.8 km	MPC · JPL
367217	2007 EZ_{46}	—	March 9, 2007	Kitt Peak	Spacewatch	·	2.3 km	MPC · JPL
367218	2007 EX_{47}	—	March 9, 2007	Mount Lemmon	Mount Lemmon Survey	·	1.9 km	MPC · JPL
367219	2007 EF_{79}	—	March 10, 2007	Kitt Peak	Spacewatch	·	3.2 km	MPC · JPL
367220	2007 EU_{87}	—	March 14, 2007	Mount Lemmon	Mount Lemmon Survey	BAR	1.6 km	MPC · JPL
367221	2007 EF_{92}	—	March 10, 2007	Kitt Peak	Spacewatch	KOR	1.7 km	MPC · JPL
367222	2007 EH_{140}	—	March 12, 2007	Mount Lemmon	Mount Lemmon Survey	·	1.8 km	MPC · JPL
367223	2007 EF_{170}	—	March 14, 2007	Kitt Peak	Spacewatch	·	3.7 km	MPC · JPL
367224	2007 EN_{201}	—	March 12, 2007	Catalina	CSS	EUP	4.9 km	MPC · JPL
367225	2007 EN_{219}	—	March 15, 2007	Kitt Peak	Spacewatch	·	2.0 km	MPC · JPL
367226	2007 FS_{23}	—	February 26, 2007	Mount Lemmon	Mount Lemmon Survey	THM	2.4 km	MPC · JPL
367227	2007 FY_{46}	—	March 16, 2007	Mount Lemmon	Mount Lemmon Survey	·	1.8 km	MPC · JPL
367228 Johannahaslehner	2007 GZ_{4}	Johannahaslehner	April 11, 2007	Gaisberg	Gierlinger, R.	·	2.9 km	MPC · JPL
367229	2007 GF_{20}	—	April 11, 2007	Kitt Peak	Spacewatch	·	2.0 km	MPC · JPL
367230	2007 HY_{13}	—	February 21, 2007	Kitt Peak	Spacewatch	HOF	2.4 km	MPC · JPL
367231	2007 HG_{24}	—	March 13, 2007	Mount Lemmon	Mount Lemmon Survey	·	3.3 km	MPC · JPL
367232	2007 HJ_{37}	—	April 20, 2007	Kitt Peak	Spacewatch	·	3.7 km	MPC · JPL
367233	2007 HH_{41}	—	January 28, 2007	Kitt Peak	Spacewatch	·	2.5 km	MPC · JPL
367234	2007 HZ_{50}	—	April 20, 2007	Kitt Peak	Spacewatch	EUP	8.6 km	MPC · JPL
367235	2007 HJ_{73}	—	April 22, 2007	Kitt Peak	Spacewatch	·	1.8 km	MPC · JPL
367236	2007 HM_{84}	—	April 22, 2007	Mount Lemmon	Mount Lemmon Survey	·	4.1 km	MPC · JPL
367237	2007 HE_{86}	—	April 24, 2007	Kitt Peak	Spacewatch	·	2.3 km	MPC · JPL
367238	2007 HL_{95}	—	April 24, 2007	Mount Lemmon	Mount Lemmon Survey	·	3.9 km	MPC · JPL
367239	2007 JL_{12}	—	May 7, 2007	Kitt Peak	Spacewatch	LIX	3.2 km	MPC · JPL
367240	2007 JE_{18}	—	May 8, 2007	Kitt Peak	Spacewatch	·	3.7 km	MPC · JPL
367241	2007 JC_{26}	—	May 9, 2007	Kitt Peak	Spacewatch	·	2.5 km	MPC · JPL
367242	2007 JK_{39}	—	May 15, 2007	Kitt Peak	Spacewatch	·	2.0 km	MPC · JPL
367243	2007 LP_{2}	—	April 25, 2007	Mount Lemmon	Mount Lemmon Survey	·	2.5 km	MPC · JPL
367244	2007 LT_{3}	—	June 8, 2007	Kitt Peak	Spacewatch	HYG	2.6 km	MPC · JPL
367245	2007 LR_{4}	—	June 8, 2007	Kitt Peak	Spacewatch	HYG	2.9 km	MPC · JPL
367246	2007 LA_{20}	—	June 9, 2007	Kitt Peak	Spacewatch	ADE	3.4 km	MPC · JPL
367247	2007 MJ_{5}	—	June 17, 2007	Kitt Peak	Spacewatch	·	2.4 km	MPC · JPL
367248	2007 MK_{13}	—	June 21, 2007	Catalina	CSS	APO · PHA · critical	390 m	MPC · JPL
367249	2007 PC_{28}	—	August 12, 2007	San Marcello	San Marcello	CYB	6.2 km	MPC · JPL
367250	2007 PA_{46}	—	August 10, 2007	Kitt Peak	Spacewatch	·	2.5 km	MPC · JPL
367251	2007 PN_{49}	—	August 10, 2007	Kitt Peak	Spacewatch	·	800 m	MPC · JPL
367252	2007 RU_{34}	—	September 6, 2007	Anderson Mesa	LONEOS	·	730 m	MPC · JPL
367253	2007 RO_{62}	—	September 10, 2007	Mount Lemmon	Mount Lemmon Survey	EOS	2.2 km	MPC · JPL
367254	2007 RS_{85}	—	September 5, 2007	Catalina	CSS	·	780 m	MPC · JPL
367255	2007 RX_{97}	—	September 10, 2007	Kitt Peak	Spacewatch	·	860 m	MPC · JPL
367256	2007 RR_{114}	—	September 11, 2007	Kitt Peak	Spacewatch	·	620 m	MPC · JPL
367257	2007 RY_{263}	—	September 15, 2007	Mount Lemmon	Mount Lemmon Survey	·	4.3 km	MPC · JPL
367258	2007 RM_{302}	—	September 15, 2007	Mount Lemmon	Mount Lemmon Survey	·	720 m	MPC · JPL
367259	2007 RR_{323}	—	September 10, 2007	Mount Lemmon	Mount Lemmon Survey	·	570 m	MPC · JPL
367260	2007 SB_{23}	—	September 25, 2007	Mount Lemmon	Mount Lemmon Survey	·	730 m	MPC · JPL
367261	2007 TT_{1}	—	October 4, 2007	Mount Lemmon	Mount Lemmon Survey	T_{j} (2.94) · HIL	5.2 km	MPC · JPL
367262	2007 TF_{27}	—	October 4, 2007	Kitt Peak	Spacewatch	·	780 m	MPC · JPL
367263	2007 TR_{48}	—	October 4, 2007	Kitt Peak	Spacewatch	·	890 m	MPC · JPL
367264	2007 TS_{48}	—	October 4, 2007	Kitt Peak	Spacewatch	·	800 m	MPC · JPL
367265	2007 TO_{68}	—	October 11, 2007	Alter Satzberg	Pietschnig, M.	LIX	3.7 km	MPC · JPL
367266	2007 TC_{89}	—	October 8, 2007	Mount Lemmon	Mount Lemmon Survey	·	720 m	MPC · JPL
367267	2007 TK_{93}	—	September 12, 2007	Mount Lemmon	Mount Lemmon Survey	(1338) (FLO)	640 m	MPC · JPL
367268	2007 TN_{93}	—	October 6, 2007	Kitt Peak	Spacewatch	·	800 m	MPC · JPL
367269	2007 TY_{143}	—	October 6, 2007	Socorro	LINEAR	·	3.3 km	MPC · JPL
367270	2007 TD_{154}	—	October 9, 2007	Socorro	LINEAR	·	1.1 km	MPC · JPL
367271	2007 TH_{172}	—	October 13, 2007	Socorro	LINEAR	·	620 m	MPC · JPL
367272	2007 TA_{181}	—	October 8, 2007	Anderson Mesa	LONEOS	·	840 m	MPC · JPL
367273	2007 TD_{195}	—	October 7, 2007	Mount Lemmon	Mount Lemmon Survey	·	620 m	MPC · JPL
367274	2007 TC_{198}	—	October 8, 2007	Kitt Peak	Spacewatch	·	750 m	MPC · JPL
367275	2007 TG_{214}	—	October 7, 2007	Kitt Peak	Spacewatch	·	760 m	MPC · JPL
367276	2007 TL_{239}	—	April 13, 2002	Palomar	NEAT	·	1.5 km	MPC · JPL
367277	2007 TQ_{261}	—	October 10, 2007	Kitt Peak	Spacewatch	·	720 m	MPC · JPL
367278	2007 TO_{270}	—	October 9, 2007	Kitt Peak	Spacewatch	·	1.4 km	MPC · JPL
367279	2007 TO_{274}	—	October 11, 2007	Kitt Peak	Spacewatch	KOR	1.5 km	MPC · JPL
367280	2007 TF_{288}	—	October 11, 2007	Catalina	CSS	·	660 m	MPC · JPL
367281	2007 TU_{299}	—	October 4, 2007	Kitt Peak	Spacewatch	·	710 m	MPC · JPL
367282	2007 TO_{319}	—	October 12, 2007	Kitt Peak	Spacewatch	·	650 m	MPC · JPL
367283	2007 TE_{331}	—	October 11, 2007	Kitt Peak	Spacewatch	·	1.3 km	MPC · JPL
367284	2007 TF_{343}	—	October 10, 2007	Mount Lemmon	Mount Lemmon Survey	·	740 m	MPC · JPL
367285	2007 TB_{387}	—	October 12, 2007	Anderson Mesa	LONEOS	·	830 m	MPC · JPL
367286	2007 TH_{390}	—	October 14, 2007	Mount Lemmon	Mount Lemmon Survey	·	610 m	MPC · JPL
367287	2007 TF_{410}	—	October 13, 2007	Catalina	CSS	·	3.8 km	MPC · JPL
367288	2007 TF_{429}	—	October 12, 2007	Kitt Peak	Spacewatch	·	760 m	MPC · JPL
367289	2007 US_{56}	—	March 18, 2002	Kitt Peak	Spacewatch	MAS	840 m	MPC · JPL
367290	2007 UP_{80}	—	October 31, 2007	Mount Lemmon	Mount Lemmon Survey	·	720 m	MPC · JPL
367291	2007 UG_{89}	—	October 30, 2007	Mount Lemmon	Mount Lemmon Survey	·	660 m	MPC · JPL
367292	2007 VO_{5}	—	November 4, 2007	Dauban	Chante-Perdrix	·	810 m	MPC · JPL
367293	2007 VQ_{46}	—	November 1, 2007	Kitt Peak	Spacewatch	·	1.4 km	MPC · JPL
367294	2007 VR_{54}	—	November 1, 2007	Kitt Peak	Spacewatch	·	700 m	MPC · JPL
367295	2007 VG_{55}	—	November 1, 2007	Kitt Peak	Spacewatch	·	810 m	MPC · JPL
367296	2007 VC_{148}	—	November 4, 2007	Kitt Peak	Spacewatch	·	710 m	MPC · JPL
367297	2007 VB_{175}	—	May 20, 2006	Siding Spring	SSS	·	810 m	MPC · JPL
367298	2007 VV_{184}	—	November 2, 2007	Mount Lemmon	Mount Lemmon Survey	PHO	1.1 km	MPC · JPL
367299	2007 VH_{192}	—	November 4, 2007	Mount Lemmon	Mount Lemmon Survey	·	820 m	MPC · JPL
367300	2007 VY_{281}	—	November 14, 2007	Kitt Peak	Spacewatch	·	700 m	MPC · JPL

== 367301–367400 ==
back to top

Designation			Discovery			Properties		Ref
Permanent	Provisional	Named after	Date	Site	Discoverer(s)	Category	Diam.	Ref
367301	2007 VK_{288}	—	November 12, 2007	Mount Lemmon	Mount Lemmon Survey	·	640 m	MPC · JPL
367302	2007 VF_{299}	—	November 4, 2007	Catalina	CSS	PHO	1.6 km	MPC · JPL
367303	2007 VM_{308}	—	November 6, 2007	Kitt Peak	Spacewatch	·	960 m	MPC · JPL
367304	2007 VU_{311}	—	November 1, 2007	Kitt Peak	Spacewatch	·	870 m	MPC · JPL
367305	2007 VD_{316}	—	November 2, 2007	Kitt Peak	Spacewatch	·	810 m	MPC · JPL
367306	2007 VX_{325}	—	March 16, 2005	Catalina	CSS	ERI	1.7 km	MPC · JPL
367307	2007 VK_{335}	—	November 8, 2007	Mount Lemmon	Mount Lemmon Survey	JUN	1.5 km	MPC · JPL
367308	2007 WU_{5}	—	November 17, 2007	Socorro	LINEAR	·	780 m	MPC · JPL
367309	2007 WA_{62}	—	November 17, 2007	Kitt Peak	Spacewatch	·	810 m	MPC · JPL
367310	2007 WU_{62}	—	November 19, 2007	Kitt Peak	Spacewatch	·	1.2 km	MPC · JPL
367311	2007 YY_{19}	—	February 9, 2005	Mount Lemmon	Mount Lemmon Survey	·	740 m	MPC · JPL
367312	2007 YR_{20}	—	November 11, 2007	Mount Lemmon	Mount Lemmon Survey	·	1.4 km	MPC · JPL
367313	2007 YB_{35}	—	December 30, 2007	Kitt Peak	Spacewatch	·	800 m	MPC · JPL
367314	2007 YZ_{48}	—	December 28, 2007	Kitt Peak	Spacewatch	·	1.3 km	MPC · JPL
367315	2007 YR_{51}	—	December 20, 2007	Kitt Peak	Spacewatch	·	670 m	MPC · JPL
367316	2007 YX_{70}	—	December 30, 2007	Catalina	CSS	·	860 m	MPC · JPL
367317	2007 YE_{73}	—	December 20, 2007	Kitt Peak	Spacewatch	·	1.2 km	MPC · JPL
367318	2008 AD_{4}	—	November 11, 2007	Mount Lemmon	Mount Lemmon Survey	·	1.4 km	MPC · JPL
367319	2008 AK_{14}	—	January 10, 2008	Mount Lemmon	Mount Lemmon Survey	V	690 m	MPC · JPL
367320	2008 AQ_{35}	—	December 30, 2007	Kitt Peak	Spacewatch	·	1.4 km	MPC · JPL
367321	2008 AC_{36}	—	January 10, 2008	Kitt Peak	Spacewatch	(2076)	650 m	MPC · JPL
367322	2008 AT_{48}	—	September 25, 2006	Kitt Peak	Spacewatch	NYS	1.4 km	MPC · JPL
367323	2008 AY_{57}	—	December 30, 2007	Kitt Peak	Spacewatch	·	1.6 km	MPC · JPL
367324	2008 AA_{61}	—	January 11, 2008	Kitt Peak	Spacewatch	·	1.6 km	MPC · JPL
367325	2008 AT_{76}	—	January 12, 2008	Kitt Peak	Spacewatch	·	1.1 km	MPC · JPL
367326	2008 AH_{96}	—	January 14, 2008	Kitt Peak	Spacewatch	·	1.6 km	MPC · JPL
367327	2008 AQ_{102}	—	January 13, 2008	Kitt Peak	Spacewatch	·	1.2 km	MPC · JPL
367328	2008 BF_{33}	—	January 30, 2008	Kitt Peak	Spacewatch	·	1.1 km	MPC · JPL
367329	2008 BY_{35}	—	January 30, 2008	Kitt Peak	Spacewatch	·	2.5 km	MPC · JPL
367330	2008 CW_{17}	—	February 3, 2008	Kitt Peak	Spacewatch	·	960 m	MPC · JPL
367331	2008 CO_{33}	—	December 5, 2007	Mount Lemmon	Mount Lemmon Survey	·	1.5 km	MPC · JPL
367332	2008 CN_{75}	—	February 11, 2008	Kitt Peak	Spacewatch	·	2.1 km	MPC · JPL
367333	2008 CP_{80}	—	February 7, 2008	Kitt Peak	Spacewatch	·	1.1 km	MPC · JPL
367334	2008 CO_{127}	—	February 8, 2008	Kitt Peak	Spacewatch	·	1.2 km	MPC · JPL
367335	2008 CS_{132}	—	February 8, 2008	Kitt Peak	Spacewatch	LEO	1.8 km	MPC · JPL
367336	2008 CA_{183}	—	February 3, 2008	Mount Lemmon	Mount Lemmon Survey	ADE	1.9 km	MPC · JPL
367337	2008 CC_{186}	—	February 2, 2008	Catalina	CSS	·	1.8 km	MPC · JPL
367338	2008 CY_{191}	—	February 2, 2008	Kitt Peak	Spacewatch	·	1.0 km	MPC · JPL
367339	2008 CS_{193}	—	February 8, 2008	Kitt Peak	Spacewatch	·	1.1 km	MPC · JPL
367340	2008 CD_{194}	—	February 9, 2008	Kitt Peak	Spacewatch	·	1.3 km	MPC · JPL
367341	2008 DJ_{6}	—	February 24, 2008	Mount Lemmon	Mount Lemmon Survey	·	1.0 km	MPC · JPL
367342	2008 DN_{35}	—	February 27, 2008	Kitt Peak	Spacewatch	·	1.8 km	MPC · JPL
367343	2008 DM_{39}	—	February 27, 2008	Mount Lemmon	Mount Lemmon Survey	·	1.5 km	MPC · JPL
367344	2008 EF_{8}	—	March 2, 2008	La Sagra	OAM	·	1.7 km	MPC · JPL
367345	2008 EW_{20}	—	March 2, 2008	Kitt Peak	Spacewatch	·	1.2 km	MPC · JPL
367346	2008 EP_{45}	—	March 5, 2008	Mount Lemmon	Mount Lemmon Survey	·	1.2 km	MPC · JPL
367347	2008 ER_{55}	—	January 11, 2008	Kitt Peak	Spacewatch	·	1.5 km	MPC · JPL
367348	2008 EZ_{56}	—	April 3, 2000	Kitt Peak	Spacewatch	·	1.5 km	MPC · JPL
367349	2008 EQ_{59}	—	March 8, 2008	Mount Lemmon	Mount Lemmon Survey	·	1.8 km	MPC · JPL
367350	2008 EM_{75}	—	March 7, 2008	Kitt Peak	Spacewatch	·	2.0 km	MPC · JPL
367351	2008 EQ_{135}	—	March 11, 2008	Kitt Peak	Spacewatch	·	2.6 km	MPC · JPL
367352	2008 EW_{137}	—	March 11, 2008	Kitt Peak	Spacewatch	·	1.3 km	MPC · JPL
367353	2008 EE_{163}	—	March 10, 2008	Kitt Peak	Spacewatch	·	1.4 km	MPC · JPL
367354	2008 ED_{165}	—	March 1, 2008	Kitt Peak	Spacewatch	·	2.6 km	MPC · JPL
367355	2008 FU_{11}	—	March 26, 2008	Mount Lemmon	Mount Lemmon Survey	V	740 m	MPC · JPL
367356	2008 FS_{12}	—	February 26, 2008	Mount Lemmon	Mount Lemmon Survey	·	1.2 km	MPC · JPL
367357	2008 FM_{15}	—	March 26, 2008	Kitt Peak	Spacewatch	·	2.2 km	MPC · JPL
367358	2008 FV_{24}	—	March 27, 2008	Kitt Peak	Spacewatch	·	1.5 km	MPC · JPL
367359	2008 FH_{28}	—	March 8, 2008	Kitt Peak	Spacewatch	·	2.3 km	MPC · JPL
367360	2008 FS_{61}	—	March 30, 2008	Kitt Peak	Spacewatch	·	1.7 km	MPC · JPL
367361	2008 FF_{76}	—	March 30, 2008	Catalina	CSS	ADE	2.3 km	MPC · JPL
367362	2008 FB_{94}	—	March 29, 2008	Kitt Peak	Spacewatch	·	2.0 km	MPC · JPL
367363	2008 FR_{99}	—	March 30, 2008	Kitt Peak	Spacewatch	·	2.1 km	MPC · JPL
367364	2008 FS_{115}	—	March 31, 2008	Mount Lemmon	Mount Lemmon Survey	·	1.1 km	MPC · JPL
367365	2008 FF_{117}	—	March 31, 2008	Kitt Peak	Spacewatch	·	1.6 km	MPC · JPL
367366	2008 FC_{119}	—	March 31, 2008	Mount Lemmon	Mount Lemmon Survey	·	1.5 km	MPC · JPL
367367	2008 FB_{124}	—	March 29, 2008	Kitt Peak	Spacewatch	·	1.8 km	MPC · JPL
367368	2008 FW_{124}	—	March 30, 2008	Kitt Peak	Spacewatch	MRX	1.2 km	MPC · JPL
367369	2008 FX_{135}	—	March 30, 2008	Kitt Peak	Spacewatch	MRX	1.3 km	MPC · JPL
367370	2008 GY_{32}	—	April 3, 2008	Kitt Peak	Spacewatch	·	1.8 km	MPC · JPL
367371	2008 GJ_{47}	—	April 4, 2008	Kitt Peak	Spacewatch	·	2.2 km	MPC · JPL
367372	2008 GR_{68}	—	April 6, 2008	Kitt Peak	Spacewatch	·	2.7 km	MPC · JPL
367373	2008 GG_{79}	—	April 7, 2008	Kitt Peak	Spacewatch	·	1.4 km	MPC · JPL
367374	2008 GK_{82}	—	April 8, 2008	Kitt Peak	Spacewatch	·	1.7 km	MPC · JPL
367375	2008 GG_{109}	—	February 28, 2008	Kitt Peak	Spacewatch	·	1.5 km	MPC · JPL
367376	2008 GD_{142}	—	April 7, 2008	Catalina	CSS	·	2.3 km	MPC · JPL
367377	2008 GB_{143}	—	April 5, 2008	Catalina	CSS	·	2.5 km	MPC · JPL
367378	2008 HB_{1}	—	April 24, 2008	Kitt Peak	Spacewatch	DOR	3.0 km	MPC · JPL
367379	2008 HF_{8}	—	April 24, 2008	Kitt Peak	Spacewatch	·	2.3 km	MPC · JPL
367380	2008 HN_{53}	—	April 29, 2008	Kitt Peak	Spacewatch	·	2.8 km	MPC · JPL
367381	2008 HD_{57}	—	April 30, 2008	Kitt Peak	Spacewatch	·	2.2 km	MPC · JPL
367382	2008 JF_{11}	—	May 3, 2008	Kitt Peak	Spacewatch	·	2.3 km	MPC · JPL
367383	2008 JX_{33}	—	May 13, 2008	Mount Lemmon	Mount Lemmon Survey	·	2.4 km	MPC · JPL
367384	2008 JO_{39}	—	May 1, 2008	Kitt Peak	Spacewatch	·	2.1 km	MPC · JPL
367385	2008 KT_{5}	—	May 17, 1999	Kitt Peak	Spacewatch	·	2.2 km	MPC · JPL
367386	2008 KX_{37}	—	May 14, 2008	Kitt Peak	Spacewatch	·	2.9 km	MPC · JPL
367387	2008 LN_{8}	—	June 6, 2008	Kitt Peak	Spacewatch	EOS	2.1 km	MPC · JPL
367388	2008 LM_{12}	—	June 10, 2008	Magdalena Ridge	Ryan, W. H.	·	2.4 km	MPC · JPL
367389	2008 MJ_{3}	—	June 30, 2008	Kitt Peak	Spacewatch	EOS	1.9 km	MPC · JPL
367390	2008 MB_{5}	—	June 30, 2008	Kitt Peak	Spacewatch	APO	560 m	MPC · JPL
367391	2008 NZ	—	July 2, 2008	La Sagra	OAM	·	2.6 km	MPC · JPL
367392 Zeri	2008 OX_{9}	Zeri	July 31, 2008	Vallemare Borbona	V. S. Casulli	·	4.6 km	MPC · JPL
367393	2008 OE_{21}	—	July 29, 2008	Kitt Peak	Spacewatch	·	4.9 km	MPC · JPL
367394	2008 OB_{22}	—	July 30, 2008	Kitt Peak	Spacewatch	·	2.3 km	MPC · JPL
367395	2008 OD_{25}	—	July 26, 2008	Siding Spring	SSS	EOS	2.1 km	MPC · JPL
367396	2008 PM_{5}	—	August 3, 2008	La Sagra	OAM	·	3.1 km	MPC · JPL
367397	2008 PC_{10}	—	August 5, 2008	La Sagra	OAM	·	3.4 km	MPC · JPL
367398	2008 PW_{11}	—	August 10, 2008	La Sagra	OAM	·	2.5 km	MPC · JPL
367399	2008 PW_{13}	—	August 10, 2008	La Sagra	OAM	·	2.4 km	MPC · JPL
367400	2008 PH_{14}	—	August 10, 2008	La Sagra	OAM	·	1.7 km	MPC · JPL

== 367401–367500 ==
back to top

Designation			Discovery			Properties		Ref
Permanent	Provisional	Named after	Date	Site	Discoverer(s)	Category	Diam.	Ref
367401	2008 PR_{15}	—	August 6, 2008	Tiki	Teamo, N.	·	3.5 km	MPC · JPL
367402	2008 PO_{21}	—	August 1, 2008	Socorro	LINEAR	·	3.9 km	MPC · JPL
367403	2008 QQ_{10}	—	August 26, 2008	Dauban	Kugel, F.	H	650 m	MPC · JPL
367404 Andreasrebers	2008 QX_{18}	Andreasrebers	August 29, 2008	Wildberg	R. Apitzsch	·	2.2 km	MPC · JPL
367405	2008 QZ_{21}	—	August 26, 2008	Socorro	LINEAR	·	3.1 km	MPC · JPL
367406 Buser	2008 QK_{23}	Buser	August 30, 2008	Winterthur	M. Griesser	·	2.9 km	MPC · JPL
367407	2008 QZ_{29}	—	August 27, 2008	La Sagra	OAM	·	5.9 km	MPC · JPL
367408	2008 QS_{30}	—	August 30, 2008	Socorro	LINEAR	·	6.0 km	MPC · JPL
367409	2008 QT_{36}	—	August 21, 2008	Kitt Peak	Spacewatch	·	2.1 km	MPC · JPL
367410	2008 QQ_{41}	—	December 3, 2005	Mauna Kea	A. Boattini	·	2.4 km	MPC · JPL
367411	2008 RB_{3}	—	September 2, 2008	Kitt Peak	Spacewatch	·	4.0 km	MPC · JPL
367412	2008 RX_{23}	—	September 5, 2008	Socorro	LINEAR	EOS	2.3 km	MPC · JPL
367413	2008 RW_{28}	—	September 2, 2008	Kitt Peak	Spacewatch	·	2.0 km	MPC · JPL
367414	2008 RZ_{49}	—	September 3, 2008	Kitt Peak	Spacewatch	·	3.2 km	MPC · JPL
367415	2008 RK_{61}	—	September 4, 2008	Kitt Peak	Spacewatch	VER	3.4 km	MPC · JPL
367416	2008 RS_{71}	—	September 6, 2008	Kitt Peak	Spacewatch	·	4.3 km	MPC · JPL
367417	2008 RO_{80}	—	September 3, 2008	Kitt Peak	Spacewatch	H	450 m	MPC · JPL
367418	2008 RO_{81}	—	September 4, 2008	Kitt Peak	Spacewatch	·	2.6 km	MPC · JPL
367419	2008 RE_{82}	—	September 4, 2008	Kitt Peak	Spacewatch	·	2.3 km	MPC · JPL
367420	2008 RA_{96}	—	September 7, 2008	Catalina	CSS	·	2.6 km	MPC · JPL
367421	2008 RC_{108}	—	September 9, 2008	Catalina	CSS	H	620 m	MPC · JPL
367422	2008 RE_{130}	—	September 6, 2008	Catalina	CSS	EOS	2.2 km	MPC · JPL
367423	2008 RP_{130}	—	September 7, 2008	Mount Lemmon	Mount Lemmon Survey	·	2.9 km	MPC · JPL
367424	2008 RM_{131}	—	September 2, 2008	Kitt Peak	Spacewatch	·	4.6 km	MPC · JPL
367425	2008 RW_{143}	—	September 6, 2008	Kitt Peak	Spacewatch	HYG	3.1 km	MPC · JPL
367426	2008 SV_{1}	—	September 23, 2008	Catalina	CSS	H	640 m	MPC · JPL
367427	2008 SZ_{9}	—	September 22, 2008	Socorro	LINEAR	·	3.3 km	MPC · JPL
367428	2008 SF_{11}	—	September 22, 2008	Calvin-Rehoboth	Calvin College	·	2.3 km	MPC · JPL
367429	2008 SD_{21}	—	September 19, 2008	Kitt Peak	Spacewatch	·	2.2 km	MPC · JPL
367430	2008 SO_{24}	—	September 19, 2008	Kitt Peak	Spacewatch	·	2.2 km	MPC · JPL
367431	2008 SB_{29}	—	September 19, 2008	Kitt Peak	Spacewatch	·	3.6 km	MPC · JPL
367432	2008 SQ_{41}	—	September 20, 2008	Mount Lemmon	Mount Lemmon Survey	HYG	2.5 km	MPC · JPL
367433	2008 SN_{51}	—	September 4, 2008	Kitt Peak	Spacewatch	·	3.0 km	MPC · JPL
367434	2008 SF_{66}	—	September 21, 2008	Mount Lemmon	Mount Lemmon Survey	T_{j} (2.92)	3.9 km	MPC · JPL
367435	2008 SW_{79}	—	September 3, 2008	Kitt Peak	Spacewatch	HYG	2.3 km	MPC · JPL
367436 Siena	2008 SM_{83}	Siena	September 27, 2008	Taunus	Karge, S., E. Schwab	·	2.7 km	MPC · JPL
367437	2008 SF_{146}	—	September 23, 2008	Kitt Peak	Spacewatch	CYB	4.3 km	MPC · JPL
367438	2008 SB_{151}	—	September 28, 2008	Sierra Stars	Tozzi, F.	·	3.3 km	MPC · JPL
367439	2008 SP_{179}	—	September 24, 2008	Mount Lemmon	Mount Lemmon Survey	·	2.8 km	MPC · JPL
367440	2008 SC_{241}	—	August 22, 2008	Kitt Peak	Spacewatch	·	3.4 km	MPC · JPL
367441	2008 SF_{242}	—	September 29, 2008	Kitt Peak	Spacewatch	·	5.1 km	MPC · JPL
367442	2008 SG_{248}	—	September 20, 2008	Kitt Peak	Spacewatch	THM	2.7 km	MPC · JPL
367443	2008 SN_{252}	—	September 22, 2008	Mount Lemmon	Mount Lemmon Survey	H	690 m	MPC · JPL
367444	2008 SJ_{259}	—	September 23, 2008	Kitt Peak	Spacewatch	H	620 m	MPC · JPL
367445	2008 SM_{259}	—	September 23, 2008	Mount Lemmon	Mount Lemmon Survey	·	3.1 km	MPC · JPL
367446	2008 SC_{274}	—	September 28, 2008	Socorro	LINEAR	·	3.1 km	MPC · JPL
367447	2008 TS_{9}	—	October 6, 2008	Socorro	LINEAR	·	5.5 km	MPC · JPL
367448	2008 TN_{16}	—	April 24, 2007	Mount Lemmon	Mount Lemmon Survey	·	2.2 km	MPC · JPL
367449	2008 TB_{112}	—	October 6, 2008	Catalina	CSS	·	2.6 km	MPC · JPL
367450	2008 TT_{148}	—	September 3, 2008	Kitt Peak	Spacewatch	·	2.6 km	MPC · JPL
367451	2008 TL_{188}	—	October 9, 2008	Mount Lemmon	Mount Lemmon Survey	·	4.4 km	MPC · JPL
367452	2008 UN_{60}	—	October 21, 2008	Kitt Peak	Spacewatch	CYB	3.4 km	MPC · JPL
367453	2008 UU_{109}	—	October 22, 2008	Kitt Peak	Spacewatch	·	2.1 km	MPC · JPL
367454	2008 UB_{114}	—	October 22, 2008	Kitt Peak	Spacewatch	·	3.6 km	MPC · JPL
367455	2008 UR_{173}	—	October 24, 2008	Catalina	CSS	THB	3.5 km	MPC · JPL
367456	2008 UO_{239}	—	March 3, 2005	Catalina	CSS	·	3.9 km	MPC · JPL
367457	2008 UW_{274}	—	October 28, 2008	Kitt Peak	Spacewatch	·	3.0 km	MPC · JPL
367458	2008 UF_{329}	—	October 30, 2008	Mount Lemmon	Mount Lemmon Survey	·	3.4 km	MPC · JPL
367459	2008 UC_{347}	—	October 18, 2008	Kitt Peak	Spacewatch	·	3.4 km	MPC · JPL
367460	2008 VC_{49}	—	November 3, 2008	Kitt Peak	Spacewatch	·	2.5 km	MPC · JPL
367461	2008 WW_{10}	—	November 18, 2008	Catalina	CSS	H	530 m	MPC · JPL
367462	2008 WE_{13}	—	November 18, 2008	Socorro	LINEAR	·	2.3 km	MPC · JPL
367463	2009 BT_{138}	—	January 29, 2009	Kitt Peak	Spacewatch	·	660 m	MPC · JPL
367464	2009 BW_{172}	—	January 19, 2009	Mount Lemmon	Mount Lemmon Survey	·	870 m	MPC · JPL
367465	2009 BC_{176}	—	January 31, 2009	Mount Lemmon	Mount Lemmon Survey	·	920 m	MPC · JPL
367466	2009 BB_{177}	—	January 18, 2009	Kitt Peak	Spacewatch	·	830 m	MPC · JPL
367467	2009 CP_{29}	—	February 1, 2009	Kitt Peak	Spacewatch	·	630 m	MPC · JPL
367468	2009 DG_{1}	—	February 17, 2009	Heppenheim	Starkenburg	·	640 m	MPC · JPL
367469	2009 DJ_{33}	—	March 6, 2002	Palomar	NEAT	·	770 m	MPC · JPL
367470	2009 DZ_{48}	—	February 19, 2009	Kitt Peak	Spacewatch	·	780 m	MPC · JPL
367471	2009 DD_{50}	—	February 19, 2009	Kitt Peak	Spacewatch	·	660 m	MPC · JPL
367472	2009 DT_{56}	—	February 22, 2009	Kitt Peak	Spacewatch	NYS	830 m	MPC · JPL
367473	2009 DO_{61}	—	February 22, 2009	Kitt Peak	Spacewatch	·	1.1 km	MPC · JPL
367474	2009 DN_{106}	—	February 27, 2009	Catalina	CSS	·	660 m	MPC · JPL
367475	2009 DS_{120}	—	February 27, 2009	Kitt Peak	Spacewatch	·	820 m	MPC · JPL
367476	2009 DZ_{128}	—	February 24, 2009	Mount Lemmon	Mount Lemmon Survey	·	760 m	MPC · JPL
367477	2009 DK_{129}	—	February 27, 2009	Kitt Peak	Spacewatch	·	800 m	MPC · JPL
367478	2009 EZ_{5}	—	March 1, 2009	Kitt Peak	Spacewatch	·	930 m	MPC · JPL
367479	2009 EF_{19}	—	March 15, 2009	Mount Lemmon	Mount Lemmon Survey	·	620 m	MPC · JPL
367480	2009 FJ_{8}	—	March 16, 2009	Kitt Peak	Spacewatch	·	780 m	MPC · JPL
367481	2009 FM_{8}	—	March 16, 2009	Kitt Peak	Spacewatch	·	1.1 km	MPC · JPL
367482	2009 FB_{29}	—	March 21, 2009	Catalina	CSS	·	820 m	MPC · JPL
367483	2009 FX_{39}	—	March 27, 2009	Catalina	CSS	·	1.4 km	MPC · JPL
367484	2009 FW_{45}	—	March 27, 2009	Catalina	CSS	·	1.6 km	MPC · JPL
367485	2009 FR_{57}	—	March 28, 2009	Kitt Peak	Spacewatch	MAS	850 m	MPC · JPL
367486	2009 FH_{63}	—	March 28, 2009	Kitt Peak	Spacewatch	NYS	1.0 km	MPC · JPL
367487	2009 GH_{1}	—	April 3, 2009	Cerro Burek	Burek, Cerro	·	1.0 km	MPC · JPL
367488 Aloisortner	2009 GR_{2}	Aloisortner	April 14, 2009	Gaisberg	Gierlinger, R.	·	770 m	MPC · JPL
367489	2009 HR_{7}	—	April 17, 2009	Kitt Peak	Spacewatch	V	630 m	MPC · JPL
367490	2009 HN_{23}	—	April 17, 2009	Mount Lemmon	Mount Lemmon Survey	·	880 m	MPC · JPL
367491	2009 HF_{25}	—	April 17, 2009	Kitt Peak	Spacewatch	·	1.1 km	MPC · JPL
367492	2009 HB_{30}	—	April 19, 2009	Kitt Peak	Spacewatch	(2076)	830 m	MPC · JPL
367493	2009 HU_{31}	—	April 19, 2009	Kitt Peak	Spacewatch	V	510 m	MPC · JPL
367494	2009 HT_{40}	—	April 20, 2009	Kitt Peak	Spacewatch	·	800 m	MPC · JPL
367495	2009 HE_{44}	—	April 20, 2009	Kitt Peak	Spacewatch	·	980 m	MPC · JPL
367496	2009 HW_{46}	—	March 16, 2009	Kitt Peak	Spacewatch	MAS	770 m	MPC · JPL
367497	2009 HU_{48}	—	December 23, 2000	Apache Point	SDSS	V	790 m	MPC · JPL
367498	2009 HB_{56}	—	March 31, 2009	Kitt Peak	Spacewatch	·	800 m	MPC · JPL
367499	2009 HA_{76}	—	April 24, 2009	Mount Lemmon	Mount Lemmon Survey	·	1.0 km	MPC · JPL
367500	2009 HE_{80}	—	April 28, 2009	Catalina	CSS	·	1.2 km	MPC · JPL

== 367501–367600 ==
back to top

Designation			Discovery			Properties		Ref
Permanent	Provisional	Named after	Date	Site	Discoverer(s)	Category	Diam.	Ref
367501	2009 HO_{97}	—	April 17, 2009	Kitt Peak	Spacewatch	·	1.2 km	MPC · JPL
367502	2009 HG_{104}	—	April 22, 2009	Kitt Peak	Spacewatch	PHO	2.2 km	MPC · JPL
367503	2009 JF_{5}	—	May 14, 2009	Mount Lemmon	Mount Lemmon Survey	·	910 m	MPC · JPL
367504	2009 JR_{16}	—	April 2, 2009	Kitt Peak	Spacewatch	NYS	1.1 km	MPC · JPL
367505	2009 KK_{1}	—	May 18, 2009	La Sagra	OAM	PHO	1.0 km	MPC · JPL
367506	2009 KN_{15}	—	May 26, 2009	Kitt Peak	Spacewatch	MAS	660 m	MPC · JPL
367507	2009 KG_{28}	—	May 30, 2009	Mount Lemmon	Mount Lemmon Survey	·	1.3 km	MPC · JPL
367508	2009 KP_{30}	—	May 16, 2009	Kitt Peak	Spacewatch	PHO	1.0 km	MPC · JPL
367509	2009 LD_{7}	—	June 15, 2009	XuYi	PMO NEO Survey Program	PHO	1.5 km	MPC · JPL
367510	2009 NV	—	April 22, 2009	Mount Lemmon	Mount Lemmon Survey	PHO	1.5 km	MPC · JPL
367511	2009 NZ	—	August 1, 2005	Siding Spring	SSS	EUN	2.0 km	MPC · JPL
367512	2009 NA_{2}	—	July 13, 2009	Kitt Peak	Spacewatch	·	1.3 km	MPC · JPL
367513	2009 OY_{3}	—	July 16, 2009	La Sagra	OAM	·	1.7 km	MPC · JPL
367514	2009 OQ_{5}	—	July 24, 2009	Črni Vrh	Vales, J.	·	1.9 km	MPC · JPL
367515	2009 OD_{9}	—	July 28, 2009	La Sagra	OAM	·	1.6 km	MPC · JPL
367516	2009 OT_{20}	—	July 25, 2009	La Sagra	OAM	·	1.2 km	MPC · JPL
367517	2009 OU_{24}	—	July 31, 2009	Catalina	CSS	·	2.0 km	MPC · JPL
367518	2009 PU_{2}	—	August 15, 2009	Farra d'Isonzo	Farra d'Isonzo	·	1.4 km	MPC · JPL
367519	2009 PW_{2}	—	August 15, 2009	Skylive	Tozzi, F.	·	1.5 km	MPC · JPL
367520	2009 PC_{16}	—	August 15, 2009	Kitt Peak	Spacewatch	·	1.7 km	MPC · JPL
367521	2009 PW_{16}	—	August 15, 2009	Kitt Peak	Spacewatch	·	1.9 km	MPC · JPL
367522	2009 PC_{18}	—	August 15, 2009	Kitt Peak	Spacewatch	WIT	1.1 km	MPC · JPL
367523	2009 QV_{3}	—	August 16, 2009	Catalina	CSS	·	2.0 km	MPC · JPL
367524	2009 QL_{5}	—	August 18, 2009	Pla D'Arguines	D'Arguines, Pla	·	3.1 km	MPC · JPL
367525	2009 QZ_{6}	—	August 19, 2009	Catalina	CSS	AMO +1km	970 m	MPC · JPL
367526	2009 QB_{13}	—	August 16, 2009	Kitt Peak	Spacewatch	NYS	1.1 km	MPC · JPL
367527	2009 QS_{13}	—	August 16, 2009	Kitt Peak	Spacewatch	·	2.1 km	MPC · JPL
367528	2009 QE_{19}	—	August 18, 2009	La Sagra	OAM	(5)	1.0 km	MPC · JPL
367529	2009 QR_{25}	—	June 24, 2009	Mount Lemmon	Mount Lemmon Survey	·	2.0 km	MPC · JPL
367530	2009 QC_{31}	—	August 24, 2009	La Sagra	OAM	BRA	1.7 km	MPC · JPL
367531	2009 QN_{33}	—	July 31, 2009	Kitt Peak	Spacewatch	·	2.0 km	MPC · JPL
367532	2009 QE_{36}	—	August 23, 2009	Hibiscus	Teamo, N.	·	900 m	MPC · JPL
367533	2009 QK_{50}	—	August 28, 2009	Kitt Peak	Spacewatch	·	1.7 km	MPC · JPL
367534	2009 RM_{7}	—	September 10, 2009	Moletai	K. Černis, Zdanavicius, J.	·	1.6 km	MPC · JPL
367535	2009 RT_{9}	—	September 12, 2009	Kitt Peak	Spacewatch	·	1.5 km	MPC · JPL
367536	2009 RS_{10}	—	September 12, 2009	Kitt Peak	Spacewatch	·	2.2 km	MPC · JPL
367537	2009 RH_{11}	—	September 12, 2009	Kitt Peak	Spacewatch	·	1.5 km	MPC · JPL
367538	2009 RB_{13}	—	September 12, 2009	Kitt Peak	Spacewatch	·	1.7 km	MPC · JPL
367539	2009 RA_{22}	—	September 15, 2009	Kitt Peak	Spacewatch	·	1.7 km	MPC · JPL
367540	2009 RU_{29}	—	September 14, 2009	Kitt Peak	Spacewatch	·	1.7 km	MPC · JPL
367541	2009 RK_{31}	—	September 14, 2009	Kitt Peak	Spacewatch	·	1.4 km	MPC · JPL
367542	2009 RH_{32}	—	September 14, 2009	Kitt Peak	Spacewatch	·	1.3 km	MPC · JPL
367543	2009 RL_{32}	—	September 14, 2009	Catalina	CSS	·	1.6 km	MPC · JPL
367544	2009 RV_{33}	—	September 14, 2009	Kitt Peak	Spacewatch	KOR	1.1 km	MPC · JPL
367545	2009 RD_{44}	—	September 15, 2009	Kitt Peak	Spacewatch	·	2.2 km	MPC · JPL
367546	2009 RO_{52}	—	September 15, 2009	Kitt Peak	Spacewatch	KOR	1.4 km	MPC · JPL
367547	2009 RU_{55}	—	September 15, 2009	Kitt Peak	Spacewatch	·	2.0 km	MPC · JPL
367548	2009 RN_{63}	—	September 15, 2009	Kitt Peak	Spacewatch	·	2.3 km	MPC · JPL
367549	2009 RU_{69}	—	September 8, 2009	Siding Spring	SSS	BAR	1.8 km	MPC · JPL
367550	2009 RH_{71}	—	February 26, 2007	Mount Lemmon	Mount Lemmon Survey	·	3.6 km	MPC · JPL
367551	2009 RH_{73}	—	September 23, 2000	Socorro	LINEAR	·	2.3 km	MPC · JPL
367552	2009 ST_{2}	—	September 16, 2009	Kitt Peak	Spacewatch	·	2.0 km	MPC · JPL
367553	2009 SO_{3}	—	September 16, 2009	Kitt Peak	Spacewatch	·	1.8 km	MPC · JPL
367554	2009 SE_{23}	—	September 16, 2009	Kitt Peak	Spacewatch	·	1.2 km	MPC · JPL
367555	2009 SQ_{34}	—	September 16, 2009	Kitt Peak	Spacewatch	AGN	1.3 km	MPC · JPL
367556	2009 SP_{36}	—	September 16, 2009	Kitt Peak	Spacewatch	HOF	2.2 km	MPC · JPL
367557	2009 SH_{47}	—	September 16, 2009	Kitt Peak	Spacewatch	·	2.1 km	MPC · JPL
367558	2009 ST_{60}	—	September 17, 2009	Kitt Peak	Spacewatch	·	1.7 km	MPC · JPL
367559	2009 SX_{68}	—	September 17, 2009	Kitt Peak	Spacewatch	HOF	2.2 km	MPC · JPL
367560	2009 SO_{69}	—	September 17, 2009	Kitt Peak	Spacewatch	·	2.8 km	MPC · JPL
367561	2009 SB_{70}	—	August 16, 2009	Calvin-Rehoboth	L. A. Molnar	·	1.8 km	MPC · JPL
367562	2009 SU_{74}	—	September 17, 2009	Kitt Peak	Spacewatch	·	3.9 km	MPC · JPL
367563	2009 SH_{79}	—	September 18, 2009	Kitt Peak	Spacewatch	·	1.9 km	MPC · JPL
367564	2009 SQ_{100}	—	September 18, 2009	Kitt Peak	Spacewatch	·	1.6 km	MPC · JPL
367565	2009 SW_{101}	—	September 23, 2009	Dauban	Kugel, F.	·	2.3 km	MPC · JPL
367566	2009 SC_{105}	—	September 16, 2009	Kitt Peak	Spacewatch	·	1.6 km	MPC · JPL
367567	2009 SU_{106}	—	September 16, 2009	Mount Lemmon	Mount Lemmon Survey	WIT	930 m	MPC · JPL
367568	2009 SB_{108}	—	September 16, 2009	Mount Lemmon	Mount Lemmon Survey	·	3.9 km	MPC · JPL
367569	2009 SK_{120}	—	September 18, 2009	Kitt Peak	Spacewatch	·	1.1 km	MPC · JPL
367570	2009 SV_{141}	—	September 19, 2009	Kitt Peak	Spacewatch	·	1.9 km	MPC · JPL
367571	2009 SK_{150}	—	September 20, 2009	Kitt Peak	Spacewatch	·	1.4 km	MPC · JPL
367572	2009 SY_{151}	—	February 21, 2007	Mount Lemmon	Mount Lemmon Survey	·	2.2 km	MPC · JPL
367573	2009 SG_{169}	—	November 2, 2000	Kitt Peak	Spacewatch	·	2.7 km	MPC · JPL
367574	2009 SH_{174}	—	September 18, 2009	Mount Lemmon	Mount Lemmon Survey	MRX	770 m	MPC · JPL
367575	2009 SY_{180}	—	September 21, 2009	Mount Lemmon	Mount Lemmon Survey	·	1.2 km	MPC · JPL
367576	2009 SC_{184}	—	September 21, 2009	Kitt Peak	Spacewatch	·	2.2 km	MPC · JPL
367577	2009 SB_{211}	—	September 23, 2009	Kitt Peak	Spacewatch	EOS	2.1 km	MPC · JPL
367578	2009 SZ_{212}	—	September 23, 2009	Kitt Peak	Spacewatch	·	2.0 km	MPC · JPL
367579	2009 SH_{216}	—	September 24, 2009	Kitt Peak	Spacewatch	HOF	2.4 km	MPC · JPL
367580	2009 SF_{217}	—	September 24, 2009	Catalina	CSS	EUN	1.6 km	MPC · JPL
367581	2009 SA_{227}	—	March 11, 2007	Kitt Peak	Spacewatch	·	3.7 km	MPC · JPL
367582	2009 SS_{230}	—	September 17, 2009	Mount Lemmon	Mount Lemmon Survey	·	1.7 km	MPC · JPL
367583	2009 SS_{236}	—	June 14, 2004	Kitt Peak	Spacewatch	(18466)	2.6 km	MPC · JPL
367584	2009 SE_{241}	—	August 19, 2009	Catalina	CSS	·	3.0 km	MPC · JPL
367585	2009 SP_{251}	—	September 20, 2009	Kitt Peak	Spacewatch	MRX	1.0 km	MPC · JPL
367586	2009 SJ_{254}	—	September 20, 2009	Kitt Peak	Spacewatch	·	2.6 km	MPC · JPL
367587	2009 SP_{254}	—	September 24, 2009	Kitt Peak	Spacewatch	·	4.1 km	MPC · JPL
367588	2009 SY_{261}	—	September 23, 2009	Kitt Peak	Spacewatch	·	3.9 km	MPC · JPL
367589	2009 SD_{263}	—	September 23, 2009	Mount Lemmon	Mount Lemmon Survey	·	1.8 km	MPC · JPL
367590	2009 SQ_{266}	—	September 23, 2009	Mount Lemmon	Mount Lemmon Survey	·	1.8 km	MPC · JPL
367591	2009 SC_{273}	—	December 7, 2004	Socorro	LINEAR	TIR	3.1 km	MPC · JPL
367592	2009 SM_{279}	—	September 17, 2009	Kitt Peak	Spacewatch	·	1.7 km	MPC · JPL
367593	2009 SO_{281}	—	September 25, 2009	Kitt Peak	Spacewatch	·	1.6 km	MPC · JPL
367594	2009 SR_{287}	—	September 21, 2009	Kitt Peak	Spacewatch	(16286)	1.9 km	MPC · JPL
367595	2009 SF_{312}	—	September 18, 2009	Mount Lemmon	Mount Lemmon Survey	WIT	1.2 km	MPC · JPL
367596	2009 SO_{316}	—	September 19, 2009	Mount Lemmon	Mount Lemmon Survey	·	2.9 km	MPC · JPL
367597	2009 SP_{337}	—	September 28, 2009	Catalina	CSS	·	1.6 km	MPC · JPL
367598	2009 SW_{340}	—	March 13, 2007	Mount Lemmon	Mount Lemmon Survey	·	2.9 km	MPC · JPL
367599	2009 SX_{340}	—	September 18, 2009	Kitt Peak	Spacewatch	KOR	1.5 km	MPC · JPL
367600	2009 SH_{341}	—	September 25, 2009	Kitt Peak	Spacewatch	·	1.3 km	MPC · JPL

== 367601–367700 ==
back to top

Designation			Discovery			Properties		Ref
Permanent	Provisional	Named after	Date	Site	Discoverer(s)	Category	Diam.	Ref
367601	2009 SQ_{341}	—	February 7, 2006	Catalina	CSS	·	2.3 km	MPC · JPL
367602	2009 SA_{348}	—	September 19, 2009	Charleston	Astronomical Research Observatory	EOS	2.5 km	MPC · JPL
367603	2009 SN_{363}	—	September 18, 2009	Kitt Peak	Spacewatch	·	1.5 km	MPC · JPL
367604	2009 SC_{364}	—	September 28, 2009	Mount Lemmon	Mount Lemmon Survey	·	3.4 km	MPC · JPL
367605	2009 TA_{8}	—	October 14, 2009	Tzec Maun	Tozzi, F.	·	2.3 km	MPC · JPL
367606	2009 TV_{24}	—	October 14, 2009	Vail-Jarnac	Jarnac	·	3.0 km	MPC · JPL
367607	2009 TZ_{31}	—	September 23, 2009	Mount Lemmon	Mount Lemmon Survey	·	2.0 km	MPC · JPL
367608	2009 TX_{32}	—	October 15, 2009	Mount Lemmon	Mount Lemmon Survey	·	1.8 km	MPC · JPL
367609	2009 TG_{37}	—	October 15, 2009	Mount Lemmon	Mount Lemmon Survey	DOR	3.4 km	MPC · JPL
367610	2009 TT_{37}	—	October 12, 2009	Mount Lemmon	Mount Lemmon Survey	·	2.5 km	MPC · JPL
367611	2009 TT_{38}	—	November 14, 1999	Socorro	LINEAR	EOS	2.2 km	MPC · JPL
367612	2009 TU_{40}	—	October 15, 2009	Catalina	CSS	·	5.2 km	MPC · JPL
367613	2009 TC_{43}	—	October 1, 2009	Kitt Peak	Spacewatch	HOF	2.3 km	MPC · JPL
367614	2009 TU_{44}	—	October 14, 2009	Catalina	CSS	·	2.6 km	MPC · JPL
367615	2009 TG_{47}	—	October 14, 2009	Catalina	CSS	·	2.1 km	MPC · JPL
367616	2009 UU	—	October 16, 2009	Catalina	CSS	·	2.5 km	MPC · JPL
367617	2009 UC_{16}	—	October 18, 2009	Catalina	CSS	·	2.6 km	MPC · JPL
367618	2009 UY_{30}	—	October 18, 2009	Mount Lemmon	Mount Lemmon Survey	·	1.7 km	MPC · JPL
367619	2009 UB_{85}	—	March 15, 2007	Mount Lemmon	Mount Lemmon Survey	·	2.6 km	MPC · JPL
367620	2009 UJ_{97}	—	October 23, 2009	Kitt Peak	Spacewatch	KOR	1.5 km	MPC · JPL
367621	2009 UN_{104}	—	October 25, 2009	Mount Lemmon	Mount Lemmon Survey	·	3.6 km	MPC · JPL
367622	2009 UC_{109}	—	October 23, 2009	Mount Lemmon	Mount Lemmon Survey	·	3.2 km	MPC · JPL
367623	2009 UC_{113}	—	October 26, 2009	Mount Lemmon	Mount Lemmon Survey	·	5.1 km	MPC · JPL
367624	2009 UR_{126}	—	October 20, 2009	Catalina	CSS	JUN	1.1 km	MPC · JPL
367625	2009 UW_{128}	—	October 29, 2009	Bisei SG Center	BATTeRS	·	2.3 km	MPC · JPL
367626	2009 US_{149}	—	October 26, 2009	Mount Lemmon	Mount Lemmon Survey	·	4.1 km	MPC · JPL
367627	2009 VE_{4}	—	November 8, 2009	Kitt Peak	Spacewatch	·	5.2 km	MPC · JPL
367628	2009 VX_{40}	—	November 8, 2009	Kitt Peak	Spacewatch	·	4.4 km	MPC · JPL
367629	2009 VH_{41}	—	January 23, 2006	Kitt Peak	Spacewatch	·	2.8 km	MPC · JPL
367630	2009 VW_{49}	—	November 11, 2009	La Sagra	OAM	·	3.4 km	MPC · JPL
367631	2009 VY_{61}	—	November 8, 2009	Kitt Peak	Spacewatch	EOS	2.1 km	MPC · JPL
367632	2009 VO_{68}	—	November 9, 2009	Kitt Peak	Spacewatch	·	3.4 km	MPC · JPL
367633 Shargorodskij	2009 VC_{75}	Shargorodskij	November 11, 2009	Zelenchukskaya Stn	T. V. Krjačko	·	2.3 km	MPC · JPL
367634	2009 VL_{87}	—	November 10, 2009	Kitt Peak	Spacewatch	EOS	2.4 km	MPC · JPL
367635	2009 VC_{93}	—	November 9, 2009	Kitt Peak	Spacewatch	·	3.6 km	MPC · JPL
367636	2009 VT_{108}	—	November 9, 2009	Catalina	CSS	·	4.4 km	MPC · JPL
367637	2009 VG_{113}	—	November 10, 2009	Kitt Peak	Spacewatch	·	4.0 km	MPC · JPL
367638	2009 WR_{6}	—	November 18, 2009	Catalina	CSS	AMO	770 m	MPC · JPL
367639	2009 WY_{23}	—	November 19, 2009	Kachina	Hobart, J.	·	5.8 km	MPC · JPL
367640	2009 WR_{26}	—	November 16, 2009	Kitt Peak	Spacewatch	·	2.2 km	MPC · JPL
367641	2009 WD_{33}	—	November 16, 2009	Kitt Peak	Spacewatch	·	3.5 km	MPC · JPL
367642	2009 WM_{50}	—	October 18, 2009	Catalina	CSS	·	3.0 km	MPC · JPL
367643	2009 WZ_{52}	—	November 22, 2009	Bisei SG Center	BATTeRS	·	4.6 km	MPC · JPL
367644	2009 WR_{53}	—	November 16, 2009	Socorro	LINEAR	·	2.2 km	MPC · JPL
367645	2009 WY_{61}	—	September 26, 2003	Apache Point	SDSS	·	3.8 km	MPC · JPL
367646	2009 WH_{70}	—	October 30, 2009	Mount Lemmon	Mount Lemmon Survey	·	4.3 km	MPC · JPL
367647	2009 WR_{72}	—	November 18, 2009	Kitt Peak	Spacewatch	EOS	2.7 km	MPC · JPL
367648	2009 WZ_{76}	—	November 18, 2009	Kitt Peak	Spacewatch	EOS ·	4.7 km	MPC · JPL
367649	2009 WF_{81}	—	November 18, 2009	Kitt Peak	Spacewatch	·	4.9 km	MPC · JPL
367650	2009 WR_{85}	—	December 13, 2004	Campo Imperatore	CINEOS	·	3.9 km	MPC · JPL
367651	2009 WJ_{93}	—	November 19, 2009	La Sagra	OAM	·	3.0 km	MPC · JPL
367652	2009 WR_{121}	—	November 20, 2009	Kitt Peak	Spacewatch	EOS	2.5 km	MPC · JPL
367653	2009 WP_{143}	—	November 19, 2009	Mount Lemmon	Mount Lemmon Survey	KOR	1.5 km	MPC · JPL
367654	2009 WS_{159}	—	November 21, 2009	Kitt Peak	Spacewatch	·	3.9 km	MPC · JPL
367655	2009 WR_{202}	—	November 26, 2009	Catalina	CSS	·	4.1 km	MPC · JPL
367656	2009 WF_{223}	—	November 16, 2009	Kitt Peak	Spacewatch	·	2.8 km	MPC · JPL
367657	2009 WD_{235}	—	November 20, 2009	Kitt Peak	Spacewatch	KOR	1.4 km	MPC · JPL
367658	2009 WN_{236}	—	November 23, 2009	Mount Lemmon	Mount Lemmon Survey	·	2.0 km	MPC · JPL
367659	2009 WE_{244}	—	November 11, 2009	Kitt Peak	Spacewatch	·	2.8 km	MPC · JPL
367660	2009 WN_{244}	—	November 19, 2009	Kitt Peak	Spacewatch	·	1.2 km	MPC · JPL
367661	2009 WF_{250}	—	November 22, 2009	Mount Lemmon	Mount Lemmon Survey	·	4.5 km	MPC · JPL
367662	2009 XL_{20}	—	December 9, 2009	La Sagra	OAM	·	2.3 km	MPC · JPL
367663	2009 XV_{20}	—	December 15, 2009	Bergisch Gladbach	W. Bickel	·	6.5 km	MPC · JPL
367664	2009 XE_{23}	—	December 9, 2009	Socorro	LINEAR	·	4.8 km	MPC · JPL
367665	2009 XG_{25}	—	August 11, 2002	Palomar	NEAT	·	7.9 km	MPC · JPL
367666	2009 YT_{22}	—	December 18, 2009	Kitt Peak	Spacewatch	·	3.8 km	MPC · JPL
367667	2010 AP_{43}	—	September 30, 2003	Kitt Peak	Spacewatch	GEF	1.8 km	MPC · JPL
367668	2010 AU_{73}	—	November 17, 2009	Kitt Peak	Spacewatch	·	5.3 km	MPC · JPL
367669	2010 AG_{81}	—	September 6, 2008	Catalina	CSS	·	3.4 km	MPC · JPL
367670	2010 BM_{30}	—	September 17, 2009	Mount Lemmon	Mount Lemmon Survey	·	5.2 km	MPC · JPL
367671	2010 BX_{64}	—	January 22, 2010	WISE	WISE	·	5.4 km	MPC · JPL
367672	2010 CO_{128}	—	August 23, 2007	Kitt Peak	Spacewatch	EOS	2.2 km	MPC · JPL
367673	2010 CO_{147}	—	February 13, 2010	Catalina	CSS	·	4.8 km	MPC · JPL
367674	2010 EJ_{15}	—	March 6, 2010	WISE	WISE	·	6.1 km	MPC · JPL
367675	2010 EE_{76}	—	March 12, 2010	Kitt Peak	Spacewatch	H	560 m	MPC · JPL
367676	2010 JV_{81}	—	May 12, 2010	WISE	WISE	·	810 m	MPC · JPL
367677	2010 ML_{17}	—	June 17, 2010	WISE	WISE	·	1.1 km	MPC · JPL
367678	2010 MY_{56}	—	June 24, 2010	WISE	WISE	·	1.6 km	MPC · JPL
367679	2010 MB_{104}	—	June 29, 2010	WISE	WISE	·	1.7 km	MPC · JPL
367680	2010 ME_{109}	—	November 9, 2007	Kitt Peak	Spacewatch	·	1 km	MPC · JPL
367681	2010 NL_{82}	—	July 1, 2010	WISE	WISE	·	1.3 km	MPC · JPL
367682	2010 NB_{99}	—	July 12, 2010	WISE	WISE	CLA	1.8 km	MPC · JPL
367683	2010 OP_{8}	—	July 16, 2010	WISE	WISE	CLA	1.5 km	MPC · JPL
367684	2010 OS_{22}	—	July 20, 2010	Socorro	LINEAR	APO +1km	500 m	MPC · JPL
367685	2010 OV_{78}	—	February 13, 2008	Kitt Peak	Spacewatch	·	2.6 km	MPC · JPL
367686	2010 PB_{61}	—	October 9, 2007	Kitt Peak	Spacewatch	·	580 m	MPC · JPL
367687	2010 RT_{2}	—	September 28, 2003	Socorro	LINEAR	·	1.1 km	MPC · JPL
367688	2010 RQ_{36}	—	March 19, 1996	Kitt Peak	Spacewatch	·	770 m	MPC · JPL
367689	2010 RD_{59}	—	March 5, 2006	Kitt Peak	Spacewatch	·	660 m	MPC · JPL
367690	2010 RN_{59}	—	September 6, 2010	Kitt Peak	Spacewatch	·	620 m	MPC · JPL
367691	2010 RS_{82}	—	September 8, 2010	Socorro	LINEAR	·	860 m	MPC · JPL
367692	2010 RW_{99}	—	September 10, 2010	Kitt Peak	Spacewatch	·	730 m	MPC · JPL
367693 Montmagastrell	2010 RZ_{109}	Montmagastrell	September 13, 2010	SM Montmagastrell	SM Montmagastrell	·	1.2 km	MPC · JPL
367694	2010 RD_{110}	—	September 14, 2010	Kitt Peak	Spacewatch	·	670 m	MPC · JPL
367695	2010 RX_{113}	—	November 18, 2007	Mount Lemmon	Mount Lemmon Survey	slow	750 m	MPC · JPL
367696	2010 RT_{126}	—	September 12, 2010	Kitt Peak	Spacewatch	·	570 m	MPC · JPL
367697	2010 RA_{128}	—	November 15, 2007	Mount Lemmon	Mount Lemmon Survey	·	870 m	MPC · JPL
367698	2010 RP_{130}	—	September 10, 2010	Mount Lemmon	Mount Lemmon Survey	·	1 km	MPC · JPL
367699	2010 RW_{164}	—	December 13, 2007	Socorro	LINEAR	·	860 m	MPC · JPL
367700	2010 RD_{178}	—	December 8, 1996	Kitt Peak	Spacewatch	·	900 m	MPC · JPL

== 367701–367800 ==
back to top

Designation			Discovery			Properties		Ref
Permanent	Provisional	Named after	Date	Site	Discoverer(s)	Category	Diam.	Ref
367701	2010 RY_{178}	—	October 24, 2003	Socorro	LINEAR	·	1.1 km	MPC · JPL
367702	2010 RO_{184}	—	November 19, 2003	Palomar	NEAT	V	830 m	MPC · JPL
367703	2010 SU_{6}	—	August 29, 2006	Kitt Peak	Spacewatch	V	680 m	MPC · JPL
367704	2010 SO_{31}	—	April 24, 2003	Kitt Peak	Spacewatch	·	730 m	MPC · JPL
367705	2010 TZ_{6}	—	November 4, 2007	Kitt Peak	Spacewatch	·	730 m	MPC · JPL
367706	2010 TB_{12}	—	October 2, 2010	Kitt Peak	Spacewatch	DOR	2.4 km	MPC · JPL
367707	2010 TR_{18}	—	September 15, 2010	Kitt Peak	Spacewatch	·	710 m	MPC · JPL
367708	2010 TV_{18}	—	August 24, 2000	Socorro	LINEAR	·	720 m	MPC · JPL
367709	2010 TW_{18}	—	February 1, 2008	Kitt Peak	Spacewatch	·	1.2 km	MPC · JPL
367710	2010 TY_{19}	—	September 30, 2003	Kitt Peak	Spacewatch	·	990 m	MPC · JPL
367711	2010 TA_{27}	—	September 2, 2010	Mount Lemmon	Mount Lemmon Survey	·	1.0 km	MPC · JPL
367712	2010 TO_{32}	—	October 31, 1999	Kitt Peak	Spacewatch	MAS	690 m	MPC · JPL
367713	2010 TE_{41}	—	April 22, 2004	Desert Eagle	W. K. Y. Yeung	·	1.6 km	MPC · JPL
367714	2010 TR_{42}	—	September 10, 2010	Kitt Peak	Spacewatch	·	770 m	MPC · JPL
367715	2010 TF_{59}	—	October 21, 2006	Lulin	LUSS	EUN	1.3 km	MPC · JPL
367716	2010 TU_{64}	—	November 5, 2007	Mount Lemmon	Mount Lemmon Survey	·	1.8 km	MPC · JPL
367717	2010 TW_{115}	—	October 9, 2010	Catalina	CSS	·	1.0 km	MPC · JPL
367718	2010 TN_{145}	—	December 19, 2003	Kitt Peak	Spacewatch	·	1.3 km	MPC · JPL
367719	2010 TC_{147}	—	October 16, 2003	Kitt Peak	Spacewatch	·	750 m	MPC · JPL
367720	2010 TF_{148}	—	September 19, 2003	Kitt Peak	Spacewatch	·	660 m	MPC · JPL
367721	2010 TZ_{184}	—	October 19, 2003	Kitt Peak	Spacewatch	NYS	1.2 km	MPC · JPL
367722	2010 TY_{187}	—	October 3, 2003	Kitt Peak	Spacewatch	·	860 m	MPC · JPL
367723	2010 TC_{188}	—	September 22, 2003	Kitt Peak	Spacewatch	·	950 m	MPC · JPL
367724	2010 UF_{1}	—	September 21, 2003	Anderson Mesa	LONEOS	·	940 m	MPC · JPL
367725	2010 UL_{6}	—	March 22, 2009	Mount Lemmon	Mount Lemmon Survey	NYS	1.1 km	MPC · JPL
367726	2010 UU_{13}	—	February 11, 2004	Kitt Peak	Spacewatch	·	1.1 km	MPC · JPL
367727	2010 UU_{26}	—	September 25, 2003	Haleakala	NEAT	·	720 m	MPC · JPL
367728	2010 UD_{54}	—	September 16, 2010	Mount Lemmon	Mount Lemmon Survey	·	840 m	MPC · JPL
367729	2010 UL_{54}	—	August 20, 2006	Palomar	NEAT	V	710 m	MPC · JPL
367730	2010 UM_{56}	—	September 15, 2006	Kitt Peak	Spacewatch	NYS	1.2 km	MPC · JPL
367731	2010 US_{62}	—	August 6, 2010	WISE	WISE	·	2.7 km	MPC · JPL
367732 Mikesimonsen	2010 UT_{62}	Mikesimonsen	May 4, 2005	Faulkes Telescope	Bedient, J.	V	570 m	MPC · JPL
367733	2010 UY_{62}	—	September 16, 2006	Catalina	CSS	·	1.6 km	MPC · JPL
367734	2010 UV_{69}	—	August 15, 2006	Palomar	NEAT	·	1.5 km	MPC · JPL
367735	2010 UW_{69}	—	February 7, 2008	Kitt Peak	Spacewatch	MAS	800 m	MPC · JPL
367736	2010 UV_{72}	—	September 25, 2003	Palomar	NEAT	·	1.1 km	MPC · JPL
367737	2010 UX_{76}	—	October 20, 2003	Socorro	LINEAR	·	1.1 km	MPC · JPL
367738	2010 UV_{94}	—	October 29, 2003	Kitt Peak	Spacewatch	(2076)	800 m	MPC · JPL
367739	2010 US_{97}	—	March 15, 2004	Kitt Peak	Spacewatch	·	1.4 km	MPC · JPL
367740	2010 VG_{25}	—	October 14, 2010	Mount Lemmon	Mount Lemmon Survey	·	3.7 km	MPC · JPL
367741	2010 VW_{28}	—	August 16, 2006	Siding Spring	SSS	·	1.1 km	MPC · JPL
367742	2010 VT_{39}	—	October 4, 1996	Kitt Peak	Spacewatch	·	820 m	MPC · JPL
367743	2010 VC_{47}	—	September 18, 2006	Catalina	CSS	V	640 m	MPC · JPL
367744	2010 VV_{57}	—	April 10, 2005	Mount Lemmon	Mount Lemmon Survey	·	1.2 km	MPC · JPL
367745	2010 VQ_{61}	—	September 11, 2010	Catalina	CSS	·	1.6 km	MPC · JPL
367746	2010 VQ_{64}	—	November 6, 2010	Mount Lemmon	Mount Lemmon Survey	·	1.6 km	MPC · JPL
367747	2010 VU_{69}	—	November 5, 2010	Kitt Peak	Spacewatch	·	2.2 km	MPC · JPL
367748	2010 VW_{72}	—	April 12, 2002	Kitt Peak	Spacewatch	·	3.0 km	MPC · JPL
367749	2010 VU_{99}	—	October 27, 2006	Catalina	CSS	·	1.7 km	MPC · JPL
367750	2010 VA_{126}	—	June 18, 2006	Palomar	NEAT	·	970 m	MPC · JPL
367751	2010 VS_{137}	—	October 6, 2005	Mount Lemmon	Mount Lemmon Survey	TIR	3.8 km	MPC · JPL
367752	2010 VP_{167}	—	September 11, 2010	Mount Lemmon	Mount Lemmon Survey	·	1.4 km	MPC · JPL
367753	2010 VF_{170}	—	August 16, 2006	Palomar	NEAT	·	1.2 km	MPC · JPL
367754	2010 VJ_{180}	—	October 30, 2010	Kitt Peak	Spacewatch	·	3.3 km	MPC · JPL
367755	2010 VO_{182}	—	November 18, 2006	Kitt Peak	Spacewatch	·	1.9 km	MPC · JPL
367756	2010 VV_{196}	—	October 30, 2010	Mount Lemmon	Mount Lemmon Survey	·	1.9 km	MPC · JPL
367757	2010 VA_{206}	—	October 4, 2006	Mount Lemmon	Mount Lemmon Survey	·	1.5 km	MPC · JPL
367758	2010 VF_{208}	—	September 30, 2005	Mount Lemmon	Mount Lemmon Survey	KOR	2.0 km	MPC · JPL
367759	2010 VO_{209}	—	September 27, 2006	Catalina	CSS	·	1.4 km	MPC · JPL
367760	2010 VJ_{215}	—	February 8, 2008	Catalina	CSS	V	650 m	MPC · JPL
367761	2010 VF_{217}	—	October 11, 2010	Mount Lemmon	Mount Lemmon Survey	·	1.5 km	MPC · JPL
367762	2010 WQ	—	June 28, 2005	Kitt Peak	Spacewatch	·	1.3 km	MPC · JPL
367763	2010 WH_{6}	—	May 10, 2005	Cerro Tololo	Deep Ecliptic Survey	·	1.3 km	MPC · JPL
367764	2010 WP_{7}	—	January 8, 2003	Socorro	LINEAR	·	1.6 km	MPC · JPL
367765	2010 WU_{10}	—	December 21, 2006	Kitt Peak	Spacewatch	·	2.5 km	MPC · JPL
367766	2010 WS_{13}	—	November 11, 2006	Mount Lemmon	Mount Lemmon Survey	·	1.4 km	MPC · JPL
367767	2010 WW_{15}	—	November 19, 2003	Anderson Mesa	LONEOS	·	860 m	MPC · JPL
367768	2010 WQ_{59}	—	November 21, 2001	Socorro	LINEAR	·	2.5 km	MPC · JPL
367769	2010 WG_{70}	—	August 29, 2006	Kitt Peak	Spacewatch	·	1.2 km	MPC · JPL
367770	2010 WW_{71}	—	September 30, 2006	Mount Lemmon	Mount Lemmon Survey	·	1.3 km	MPC · JPL
367771	2010 WS_{73}	—	May 8, 2002	Socorro	LINEAR	EOS	2.7 km	MPC · JPL
367772	2010 XC_{3}	—	July 18, 2006	Siding Spring	SSS	·	1.2 km	MPC · JPL
367773	2010 XR_{3}	—	October 30, 2010	Kitt Peak	Spacewatch	·	1.3 km	MPC · JPL
367774	2010 XK_{5}	—	November 21, 2006	Mount Lemmon	Mount Lemmon Survey	JUN	1.1 km	MPC · JPL
367775	2010 XE_{38}	—	December 25, 2005	Kitt Peak	Spacewatch	EOS	2.3 km	MPC · JPL
367776	2010 XR_{49}	—	February 2, 2008	Mount Lemmon	Mount Lemmon Survey	·	770 m	MPC · JPL
367777	2010 XM_{51}	—	March 29, 2004	Kitt Peak	Spacewatch	KON	2.6 km	MPC · JPL
367778	2010 XH_{52}	—	November 28, 2006	Vail-Jarnac	Jarnac	·	1.6 km	MPC · JPL
367779	2010 XC_{60}	—	July 31, 2005	Palomar	NEAT	·	1.8 km	MPC · JPL
367780	2010 XM_{66}	—	June 11, 2004	Kitt Peak	Spacewatch	·	2.7 km	MPC · JPL
367781	2010 XB_{70}	—	October 12, 2006	Palomar	NEAT	V	620 m	MPC · JPL
367782	2010 XZ_{73}	—	November 19, 2006	Kitt Peak	Spacewatch	·	2.0 km	MPC · JPL
367783	2010 XU_{76}	—	November 5, 2005	Catalina	CSS	·	2.3 km	MPC · JPL
367784	2010 XJ_{85}	—	September 30, 2005	Mount Lemmon	Mount Lemmon Survey	·	2.4 km	MPC · JPL
367785	2010 XX_{85}	—	October 16, 2006	Catalina	CSS	·	1.6 km	MPC · JPL
367786	2010 YT_{5}	—	November 1, 2005	Mount Lemmon	Mount Lemmon Survey	·	2.2 km	MPC · JPL
367787	2011 AE_{1}	—	December 12, 2006	Mount Lemmon	Mount Lemmon Survey	·	1.0 km	MPC · JPL
367788	2011 AL_{3}	—	November 22, 2006	Kitt Peak	Spacewatch	·	1.6 km	MPC · JPL
367789	2011 AG_{5}	—	January 8, 2011	Mount Lemmon	Mount Lemmon Survey	APO · PHA	160 m	MPC · JPL
367790	2011 AA_{9}	—	June 9, 2007	Kitt Peak	Spacewatch	VER	3.3 km	MPC · JPL
367791	2011 AN_{12}	—	December 27, 2005	Kitt Peak	Spacewatch	·	2.6 km	MPC · JPL
367792	2011 AB_{14}	—	January 18, 2010	WISE	WISE	·	5.5 km	MPC · JPL
367793	2011 AH_{15}	—	October 20, 1993	Kitt Peak	Spacewatch	(5)	1.4 km	MPC · JPL
367794	2011 AG_{20}	—	March 11, 2002	Palomar	NEAT	(13314)	1.8 km	MPC · JPL
367795	2011 AY_{20}	—	January 7, 2006	Mount Lemmon	Mount Lemmon Survey	·	2.2 km	MPC · JPL
367796	2011 AK_{22}	—	April 3, 2008	Mount Lemmon	Mount Lemmon Survey	·	2.0 km	MPC · JPL
367797	2011 AR_{22}	—	September 27, 2001	Anderson Mesa	LONEOS	·	1.9 km	MPC · JPL
367798	2011 AA_{25}	—	July 4, 2005	Kitt Peak	Spacewatch	·	1.7 km	MPC · JPL
367799	2011 AJ_{27}	—	October 21, 2009	Mount Lemmon	Mount Lemmon Survey	·	3.2 km	MPC · JPL
367800	2011 AE_{28}	—	December 8, 2010	Mount Lemmon	Mount Lemmon Survey	·	3.2 km	MPC · JPL

== 367801–367900 ==
back to top

Designation			Discovery			Properties		Ref
Permanent	Provisional	Named after	Date	Site	Discoverer(s)	Category	Diam.	Ref
367801	2011 AF_{28}	—	September 1, 2005	Palomar	NEAT	·	1.8 km	MPC · JPL
367802	2011 AT_{29}	—	September 26, 2005	Kitt Peak	Spacewatch	·	1.5 km	MPC · JPL
367803	2011 AG_{36}	—	December 9, 2010	Mount Lemmon	Mount Lemmon Survey	·	2.7 km	MPC · JPL
367804	2011 AN_{36}	—	September 4, 2008	Kitt Peak	Spacewatch	·	4.5 km	MPC · JPL
367805	2011 AP_{40}	—	July 1, 2008	Kitt Peak	Spacewatch	·	3.2 km	MPC · JPL
367806	2011 AV_{41}	—	October 22, 2003	Apache Point	SDSS	·	2.2 km	MPC · JPL
367807	2011 AN_{44}	—	January 10, 2011	Kitt Peak	Spacewatch	·	3.4 km	MPC · JPL
367808	2011 AM_{45}	—	November 2, 2010	Mount Lemmon	Mount Lemmon Survey	·	4.2 km	MPC · JPL
367809	2011 AA_{46}	—	November 1, 2005	Mount Lemmon	Mount Lemmon Survey	AEO	1.4 km	MPC · JPL
367810	2011 AV_{46}	—	January 10, 2011	Kitt Peak	Spacewatch	·	2.6 km	MPC · JPL
367811	2011 AS_{48}	—	September 30, 2005	Kitt Peak	Spacewatch	(5)	1.4 km	MPC · JPL
367812	2011 AL_{50}	—	September 18, 2003	Kitt Peak	Spacewatch	EOS	2.1 km	MPC · JPL
367813	2011 AE_{53}	—	October 1, 2003	Kitt Peak	Spacewatch	·	3.6 km	MPC · JPL
367814	2011 AS_{57}	—	February 17, 2007	Kitt Peak	Spacewatch	AGN	1.3 km	MPC · JPL
367815	2011 AM_{58}	—	December 23, 2000	Apache Point	SDSS	·	2.7 km	MPC · JPL
367816	2011 AP_{60}	—	September 26, 2003	Apache Point	SDSS	·	2.9 km	MPC · JPL
367817	2011 AN_{66}	—	December 8, 2010	Mount Lemmon	Mount Lemmon Survey	EOS	2.5 km	MPC · JPL
367818	2011 AM_{72}	—	May 16, 2007	Mount Lemmon	Mount Lemmon Survey	EOS	2.5 km	MPC · JPL
367819	2011 AH_{73}	—	November 3, 2010	Mount Lemmon	Mount Lemmon Survey	EOS	2.5 km	MPC · JPL
367820	2011 AE_{79}	—	July 8, 2002	Palomar	NEAT	·	5.0 km	MPC · JPL
367821	2011 AR_{79}	—	August 21, 2004	Siding Spring	SSS	NEM	2.8 km	MPC · JPL
367822	2011 BY_{5}	—	August 31, 2005	Palomar	NEAT	(5)	1.6 km	MPC · JPL
367823	2011 BD_{6}	—	October 25, 2005	Catalina	CSS	NEM	2.4 km	MPC · JPL
367824	2011 BF_{11}	—	January 4, 2010	Kitt Peak	Spacewatch	·	4.2 km	MPC · JPL
367825	2011 BC_{15}	—	December 26, 2005	Kitt Peak	Spacewatch	TRE	3.2 km	MPC · JPL
367826	2011 BG_{17}	—	September 16, 2009	Catalina	CSS	·	3.3 km	MPC · JPL
367827	2011 BL_{20}	—	December 21, 2005	Kitt Peak	Spacewatch	HOF	2.6 km	MPC · JPL
367828	2011 BZ_{23}	—	September 18, 2003	Palomar	NEAT	·	3.5 km	MPC · JPL
367829	2011 BD_{25}	—	January 30, 2000	Socorro	LINEAR	TIR	4.0 km	MPC · JPL
367830	2011 BQ_{27}	—	October 5, 1996	Kitt Peak	Spacewatch	·	4.7 km	MPC · JPL
367831	2011 BM_{32}	—	August 12, 2001	Palomar	NEAT	·	1.3 km	MPC · JPL
367832	2011 BR_{32}	—	February 13, 2010	WISE	WISE	·	6.7 km	MPC · JPL
367833	2011 BV_{57}	—	February 7, 2006	Kitt Peak	Spacewatch	·	1.7 km	MPC · JPL
367834	2011 BH_{63}	—	February 6, 2002	Kitt Peak	Spacewatch	·	1.7 km	MPC · JPL
367835	2011 BQ_{80}	—	January 29, 2010	WISE	WISE	·	3.8 km	MPC · JPL
367836	2011 BB_{81}	—	July 28, 2008	Mount Lemmon	Mount Lemmon Survey	·	3.2 km	MPC · JPL
367837	2011 BC_{87}	—	February 9, 2005	Mount Lemmon	Mount Lemmon Survey	CYB	3.6 km	MPC · JPL
367838	2011 BW_{89}	—	January 26, 2006	Kitt Peak	Spacewatch	·	2.3 km	MPC · JPL
367839	2011 BO_{94}	—	December 7, 2005	Kitt Peak	Spacewatch	·	2.2 km	MPC · JPL
367840	2011 BW_{97}	—	January 29, 2011	Mount Lemmon	Mount Lemmon Survey	EOS	2.1 km	MPC · JPL
367841	2011 BQ_{101}	—	August 18, 2009	Kitt Peak	Spacewatch	·	2.1 km	MPC · JPL
367842	2011 BV_{103}	—	March 26, 2006	Mount Lemmon	Mount Lemmon Survey	·	2.8 km	MPC · JPL
367843	2011 BH_{118}	—	February 20, 2002	Kitt Peak	Spacewatch	·	2.6 km	MPC · JPL
367844	2011 BE_{120}	—	October 19, 2003	Palomar	NEAT	·	3.5 km	MPC · JPL
367845	2011 BA_{121}	—	September 22, 2003	Kitt Peak	Spacewatch	·	2.8 km	MPC · JPL
367846	2011 BB_{123}	—	January 9, 2000	Kitt Peak	Spacewatch	EOS	2.2 km	MPC · JPL
367847	2011 BV_{153}	—	December 10, 2005	Kitt Peak	Spacewatch	·	2.1 km	MPC · JPL
367848	2011 CN_{4}	—	February 14, 2010	WISE	WISE	·	4.8 km	MPC · JPL
367849	2011 CB_{9}	—	August 30, 2005	Palomar	NEAT	·	1.4 km	MPC · JPL
367850	2011 CG_{19}	—	November 12, 2005	Kitt Peak	Spacewatch	NAE	3.5 km	MPC · JPL
367851	2011 CH_{23}	—	December 10, 2010	Mount Lemmon	Mount Lemmon Survey	·	3.7 km	MPC · JPL
367852	2011 CQ_{23}	—	October 1, 2003	Kitt Peak	Spacewatch	·	3.3 km	MPC · JPL
367853	2011 CW_{29}	—	October 8, 2008	Mount Lemmon	Mount Lemmon Survey	CYB	4.5 km	MPC · JPL
367854	2011 CM_{33}	—	August 7, 2008	Kitt Peak	Spacewatch	·	3.0 km	MPC · JPL
367855	2011 CG_{36}	—	October 13, 1993	Kitt Peak	Spacewatch	(5)	1.5 km	MPC · JPL
367856	2011 CK_{44}	—	September 28, 2008	Catalina	CSS	·	3.4 km	MPC · JPL
367857	2011 CD_{46}	—	September 20, 2003	Kitt Peak	Spacewatch	·	3.3 km	MPC · JPL
367858	2011 CK_{48}	—	December 11, 2004	Kitt Peak	Spacewatch	·	4.3 km	MPC · JPL
367859	2011 CD_{59}	—	March 3, 2000	Kitt Peak	Spacewatch	(31811)	2.9 km	MPC · JPL
367860	2011 CU_{64}	—	April 25, 2007	Kitt Peak	Spacewatch	EOS	2.3 km	MPC · JPL
367861	2011 CC_{72}	—	December 8, 2010	Mount Lemmon	Mount Lemmon Survey	·	2.9 km	MPC · JPL
367862	2011 CU_{78}	—	September 30, 2003	Kitt Peak	Spacewatch	EOS	2.3 km	MPC · JPL
367863	2011 CW_{85}	—	December 10, 2004	Kitt Peak	Spacewatch	·	3.7 km	MPC · JPL
367864	2011 CB_{86}	—	December 8, 2009	Pingelly	D. Chestnov, A. Novichonok	EOS	2.5 km	MPC · JPL
367865	2011 CD_{88}	—	October 31, 2005	Mauna Kea	A. Boattini	TEL	1.6 km	MPC · JPL
367866	2011 CO_{91}	—	March 5, 2006	Kitt Peak	Spacewatch	·	2.9 km	MPC · JPL
367867	2011 CC_{107}	—	March 5, 2006	Kitt Peak	Spacewatch	·	2.9 km	MPC · JPL
367868	2011 CH_{115}	—	September 19, 2003	Palomar	NEAT	EOS	2.1 km	MPC · JPL
367869	2011 DD_{14}	—	January 22, 2006	Mount Lemmon	Mount Lemmon Survey	KOR	1.5 km	MPC · JPL
367870	2011 DL_{18}	—	October 25, 2003	Kitt Peak	Spacewatch	HYG	2.9 km	MPC · JPL
367871	2011 DL_{24}	—	February 27, 2011	Rehoboth	L. A. Molnar	EOS	2.2 km	MPC · JPL
367872	2011 DN_{28}	—	February 20, 2006	Kitt Peak	Spacewatch	EOS	1.8 km	MPC · JPL
367873	2011 DO_{30}	—	November 27, 2009	Mount Lemmon	Mount Lemmon Survey	CYB	4.7 km	MPC · JPL
367874	2011 DX_{51}	—	March 31, 2003	Kitt Peak	Spacewatch	·	1.2 km	MPC · JPL
367875	2011 EU	—	November 13, 2010	Mount Lemmon	Mount Lemmon Survey	EOS	2.3 km	MPC · JPL
367876	2011 EN_{18}	—	November 19, 2009	Kitt Peak	Spacewatch	·	3.2 km	MPC · JPL
367877	2011 EB_{35}	—	September 27, 2003	Kitt Peak	Spacewatch	THM	2.2 km	MPC · JPL
367878	2011 FG_{53}	—	September 6, 2008	Mount Lemmon	Mount Lemmon Survey	THM	2.6 km	MPC · JPL
367879	2011 FO_{157}	—	March 9, 2011	Mount Lemmon	Mount Lemmon Survey	·	3.6 km	MPC · JPL
367880	2011 HR_{11}	—	March 10, 2005	Catalina	CSS	·	3.1 km	MPC · JPL
367881	2011 LX_{4}	—	October 31, 2002	Anderson Mesa	LONEOS	·	5.9 km	MPC · JPL
367882	2011 SP_{36}	—	September 30, 2006	Mount Lemmon	Mount Lemmon Survey	·	2.4 km	MPC · JPL
367883	2011 UP_{57}	—	September 21, 2011	Kitt Peak	Spacewatch	V	960 m	MPC · JPL
367884	2011 UM_{189}	—	May 9, 2005	Anderson Mesa	LONEOS	H	690 m	MPC · JPL
367885	2011 UV_{405}	—	March 16, 2004	Kitt Peak	Spacewatch	GAL	1.6 km	MPC · JPL
367886	2011 WN_{24}	—	May 4, 2010	Siding Spring	SSS	H	750 m	MPC · JPL
367887	2011 WX_{145}	—	October 6, 2004	Kitt Peak	Spacewatch	·	970 m	MPC · JPL
367888	2011 YO_{1}	—	September 11, 2007	Kitt Peak	Spacewatch	·	840 m	MPC · JPL
367889	2011 YY_{5}	—	March 3, 2008	Siding Spring	SSS	BAR	1.6 km	MPC · JPL
367890	2011 YH_{12}	—	December 6, 2005	Kitt Peak	Spacewatch	·	3.3 km	MPC · JPL
367891	2011 YH_{20}	—	February 27, 2009	Kitt Peak	Spacewatch	·	740 m	MPC · JPL
367892	2011 YG_{59}	—	December 19, 2007	Kitt Peak	Spacewatch	NYS	1.4 km	MPC · JPL
367893	2012 AP_{4}	—	September 26, 2000	Apache Point	SDSS	V	800 m	MPC · JPL
367894	2012 AW_{5}	—	March 3, 2005	Kitt Peak	Spacewatch	·	1.4 km	MPC · JPL
367895	2012 AB_{14}	—	September 12, 2007	Catalina	CSS	·	910 m	MPC · JPL
367896	2012 AH_{14}	—	March 14, 2005	Mount Lemmon	Mount Lemmon Survey	·	1.5 km	MPC · JPL
367897	2012 AS_{23}	—	December 12, 2004	Kitt Peak	Spacewatch	V	800 m	MPC · JPL
367898	2012 BX_{16}	—	January 27, 2003	Haleakala	NEAT	·	1.9 km	MPC · JPL
367899	2012 BE_{17}	—	December 19, 2004	Mount Lemmon	Mount Lemmon Survey	·	720 m	MPC · JPL
367900	2012 BZ_{18}	—	January 16, 2005	Desert Eagle	W. K. Y. Yeung	(2076)	850 m	MPC · JPL

== 367901–368000 ==
back to top

Designation			Discovery			Properties		Ref
Permanent	Provisional	Named after	Date	Site	Discoverer(s)	Category	Diam.	Ref
367901	2012 BS_{19}	—	May 8, 2008	Siding Spring	SSS	·	2.6 km	MPC · JPL
367902	2012 BK_{29}	—	May 18, 2002	Palomar	NEAT	·	870 m	MPC · JPL
367903	2012 BJ_{44}	—	April 21, 2009	Kitt Peak	Spacewatch	MAS	730 m	MPC · JPL
367904	2012 BK_{48}	—	May 3, 2005	Kitt Peak	Spacewatch	·	1.0 km	MPC · JPL
367905	2012 BF_{52}	—	October 30, 2005	Mount Lemmon	Mount Lemmon Survey	·	3.6 km	MPC · JPL
367906	2012 BJ_{52}	—	April 9, 2003	Palomar	NEAT	·	2.4 km	MPC · JPL
367907	2012 BC_{55}	—	September 27, 2006	Mount Lemmon	Mount Lemmon Survey	·	1.7 km	MPC · JPL
367908	2012 BS_{56}	—	November 12, 2007	Mount Lemmon	Mount Lemmon Survey	·	1.8 km	MPC · JPL
367909	2012 BU_{58}	—	November 3, 2007	Kitt Peak	Spacewatch	·	1.0 km	MPC · JPL
367910	2012 BQ_{68}	—	December 20, 2004	Mount Lemmon	Mount Lemmon Survey	·	1.2 km	MPC · JPL
367911	2012 BU_{68}	—	March 18, 2009	Mount Lemmon	Mount Lemmon Survey	·	1.2 km	MPC · JPL
367912	2012 BN_{94}	—	September 16, 1998	Kitt Peak	Spacewatch	·	1.4 km	MPC · JPL
367913	2012 BV_{108}	—	January 17, 2005	Socorro	LINEAR	·	880 m	MPC · JPL
367914	2012 BX_{112}	—	August 21, 2006	Kitt Peak	Spacewatch	·	1.3 km	MPC · JPL
367915	2012 BC_{122}	—	September 29, 2005	Kitt Peak	Spacewatch	·	2.3 km	MPC · JPL
367916	2012 BX_{124}	—	September 18, 2003	Palomar	NEAT	·	1.2 km	MPC · JPL
367917	2012 BH_{125}	—	March 11, 2003	Palomar	NEAT	MRX	1.1 km	MPC · JPL
367918	2012 BZ_{125}	—	December 30, 2007	Kitt Peak	Spacewatch	·	1.3 km	MPC · JPL
367919	2012 BE_{126}	—	September 19, 2003	Palomar	NEAT	·	1.1 km	MPC · JPL
367920	2012 BY_{130}	—	February 23, 2007	Catalina	CSS	·	2.3 km	MPC · JPL
367921	2012 BA_{133}	—	March 31, 2008	Mount Lemmon	Mount Lemmon Survey	·	2.2 km	MPC · JPL
367922	2012 BG_{133}	—	February 4, 2003	Haleakala	NEAT	·	3.1 km	MPC · JPL
367923	2012 BG_{144}	—	October 3, 2006	Mount Lemmon	Mount Lemmon Survey	·	1.4 km	MPC · JPL
367924	2012 BT_{149}	—	February 16, 2004	Kitt Peak	Spacewatch	·	1.4 km	MPC · JPL
367925	2012 BN_{150}	—	September 15, 2006	Kitt Peak	Spacewatch	·	1.7 km	MPC · JPL
367926	2012 BQ_{151}	—	September 24, 2003	Palomar	NEAT	·	1.4 km	MPC · JPL
367927	2012 BQ_{152}	—	November 26, 2003	Kitt Peak	Spacewatch	V	800 m	MPC · JPL
367928	2012 CT_{11}	—	September 3, 2010	Mount Lemmon	Mount Lemmon Survey	·	1.8 km	MPC · JPL
367929	2012 CD_{14}	—	May 16, 2004	Siding Spring	SSS	JUN	1.6 km	MPC · JPL
367930	2012 CL_{15}	—	July 2, 2005	Kitt Peak	Spacewatch	·	1.2 km	MPC · JPL
367931	2012 CS_{15}	—	May 14, 2005	Kitt Peak	Spacewatch	·	1.4 km	MPC · JPL
367932	2012 CJ_{21}	—	January 15, 2005	Kitt Peak	Spacewatch	V	670 m	MPC · JPL
367933	2012 CG_{26}	—	March 11, 2005	Mount Lemmon	Mount Lemmon Survey	·	980 m	MPC · JPL
367934	2012 CM_{42}	—	March 28, 2008	Mount Lemmon	Mount Lemmon Survey	·	1.8 km	MPC · JPL
367935	2012 CA_{43}	—	December 21, 2005	Kitt Peak	Spacewatch	·	2.4 km	MPC · JPL
367936	2012 CB_{54}	—	May 10, 2005	Kitt Peak	Spacewatch	·	1.2 km	MPC · JPL
367937	2012 CW_{56}	—	March 10, 2003	Anderson Mesa	LONEOS	·	2.0 km	MPC · JPL
367938	2012 DD_{1}	—	September 26, 2006	Mount Lemmon	Mount Lemmon Survey	·	1.2 km	MPC · JPL
367939	2012 DB_{6}	—	May 14, 2002	Kitt Peak	Spacewatch	·	2.6 km	MPC · JPL
367940	2012 DW_{9}	—	April 7, 2003	Kitt Peak	Spacewatch	·	1.9 km	MPC · JPL
367941	2012 DZ_{12}	—	April 8, 2002	Palomar	NEAT	·	2.3 km	MPC · JPL
367942	2012 DP_{13}	—	August 20, 2009	Kitt Peak	Spacewatch	·	3.2 km	MPC · JPL
367943 Duende	2012 DA_{14}	Duende	February 23, 2012	La Sagra	OAM	IEO · critical	50 m	MPC · JPL
367944	2012 DR_{15}	—	November 15, 2003	Kitt Peak	Spacewatch	·	1.1 km	MPC · JPL
367945	2012 DF_{16}	—	April 16, 2005	Kitt Peak	Spacewatch	·	1.4 km	MPC · JPL
367946	2012 DP_{24}	—	November 25, 2006	Catalina	CSS	V	1.1 km	MPC · JPL
367947	2012 DE_{27}	—	March 26, 2001	Kitt Peak	Spacewatch	·	2.9 km	MPC · JPL
367948	2012 DH_{28}	—	September 29, 2005	Mount Lemmon	Mount Lemmon Survey	·	2.0 km	MPC · JPL
367949	2012 DZ_{31}	—	December 14, 2001	Kitt Peak	Spacewatch	·	660 m	MPC · JPL
367950	2012 DM_{35}	—	March 3, 2005	Catalina	CSS	·	790 m	MPC · JPL
367951	2012 DM_{44}	—	October 10, 2005	Catalina	CSS	(5)	1.8 km	MPC · JPL
367952	2012 DG_{53}	—	March 4, 2006	Mount Lemmon	Mount Lemmon Survey	CYB	3.8 km	MPC · JPL
367953	2012 DM_{55}	—	February 9, 2005	Kitt Peak	Spacewatch	·	680 m	MPC · JPL
367954	2012 DJ_{57}	—	March 10, 2005	Mount Lemmon	Mount Lemmon Survey	·	940 m	MPC · JPL
367955	2012 DV_{57}	—	December 31, 2007	Mount Lemmon	Mount Lemmon Survey	·	1.2 km	MPC · JPL
367956	2012 DL_{59}	—	December 1, 2003	Kitt Peak	Spacewatch	MAS	790 m	MPC · JPL
367957	2012 DM_{62}	—	August 30, 1995	La Silla	C.-I. Lagerkvist	·	2.4 km	MPC · JPL
367958	2012 DZ_{64}	—	March 4, 2005	Mount Lemmon	Mount Lemmon Survey	·	970 m	MPC · JPL
367959	2012 DX_{69}	—	November 8, 2007	Kitt Peak	Spacewatch	·	850 m	MPC · JPL
367960	2012 DR_{75}	—	January 19, 2012	Haleakala	Pan-STARRS 1	·	3.6 km	MPC · JPL
367961	2012 DF_{78}	—	March 19, 2001	Haleakala	NEAT	·	4.4 km	MPC · JPL
367962	2012 DJ_{79}	—	February 12, 2002	Socorro	LINEAR	·	3.0 km	MPC · JPL
367963	2012 DQ_{79}	—	January 26, 2001	Kitt Peak	Spacewatch	·	3.0 km	MPC · JPL
367964	2012 DY_{84}	—	September 29, 2009	Mount Lemmon	Mount Lemmon Survey	·	3.6 km	MPC · JPL
367965	2012 DV_{86}	—	April 2, 2006	Mount Lemmon	Mount Lemmon Survey	LIX	3.8 km	MPC · JPL
367966	2012 DV_{87}	—	September 4, 2003	Kitt Peak	Spacewatch	·	1.9 km	MPC · JPL
367967	2012 DE_{88}	—	November 1, 2005	Kitt Peak	Spacewatch	·	2.3 km	MPC · JPL
367968	2012 DC_{89}	—	November 17, 2006	Mount Lemmon	Mount Lemmon Survey	·	1.6 km	MPC · JPL
367969	2012 DU_{89}	—	December 27, 2005	Kitt Peak	Spacewatch	·	2.9 km	MPC · JPL
367970	2012 DG_{96}	—	February 8, 2002	Kitt Peak	Spacewatch	·	1.8 km	MPC · JPL
367971	2012 DZ_{96}	—	December 19, 1995	Kitt Peak	Spacewatch	·	950 m	MPC · JPL
367972	2012 DS_{97}	—	March 1, 1995	Kitt Peak	Spacewatch	TIR	3.6 km	MPC · JPL
367973	2012 DW_{97}	—	June 19, 2004	Kitt Peak	Spacewatch	·	2.2 km	MPC · JPL
367974	2012 DX_{97}	—	September 16, 2009	Catalina	CSS	NAE	3.8 km	MPC · JPL
367975	2012 EV_{10}	—	September 16, 2003	Kitt Peak	Spacewatch	·	3.5 km	MPC · JPL
367976	2012 EH_{11}	—	August 28, 2009	Kitt Peak	Spacewatch	·	3.0 km	MPC · JPL
367977	2012 EW_{11}	—	January 14, 2008	Kitt Peak	Spacewatch	V	830 m	MPC · JPL
367978	2012 ED_{12}	—	March 11, 2002	Palomar	NEAT	·	2.8 km	MPC · JPL
367979	2012 EL_{16}	—	December 27, 2006	Mount Lemmon	Mount Lemmon Survey	·	2.7 km	MPC · JPL
367980	2012 EK_{17}	—	April 11, 2007	Catalina	CSS	·	2.3 km	MPC · JPL
367981	2012 FT	—	March 23, 2003	Apache Point	SDSS	·	2.6 km	MPC · JPL
367982	2012 FT_{5}	—	August 22, 2003	Palomar	NEAT	·	3.5 km	MPC · JPL
367983	2012 FH_{7}	—	October 8, 2005	Kitt Peak	Spacewatch	·	1.9 km	MPC · JPL
367984	2012 FJ_{10}	—	March 2, 1995	Kitt Peak	Spacewatch	·	3.6 km	MPC · JPL
367985	2012 FQ_{10}	—	March 27, 2008	Mount Lemmon	Mount Lemmon Survey	·	1.2 km	MPC · JPL
367986	2012 FJ_{14}	—	July 15, 2002	Palomar	NEAT	·	3.4 km	MPC · JPL
367987	2012 FM_{14}	—	November 17, 2006	Mount Lemmon	Mount Lemmon Survey	·	1.9 km	MPC · JPL
367988	2012 FC_{15}	—	March 2, 1995	Kitt Peak	Spacewatch	·	1.7 km	MPC · JPL
367989	2012 FO_{21}	—	March 10, 2007	Mount Lemmon	Mount Lemmon Survey	·	2.2 km	MPC · JPL
367990	2012 FH_{25}	—	July 30, 2005	Palomar	NEAT	·	1.9 km	MPC · JPL
367991	2012 FL_{25}	—	May 29, 2005	Campo Imperatore	CINEOS	·	2.1 km	MPC · JPL
367992	2012 FQ_{30}	—	October 23, 2006	Mount Lemmon	Mount Lemmon Survey	·	1.6 km	MPC · JPL
367993	2012 FV_{31}	—	November 17, 2009	Mount Lemmon	Mount Lemmon Survey	·	3.2 km	MPC · JPL
367994	2012 FW_{33}	—	October 25, 2005	Mount Lemmon	Mount Lemmon Survey	AGN	1.4 km	MPC · JPL
367995	2012 FF_{36}	—	November 16, 2006	Kitt Peak	Spacewatch	·	1.5 km	MPC · JPL
367996	2012 FD_{37}	—	March 24, 2003	Kitt Peak	Spacewatch	·	2.4 km	MPC · JPL
367997	2012 FJ_{39}	—	May 30, 2008	Mount Lemmon	Mount Lemmon Survey	AEO	1.3 km	MPC · JPL
367998	2012 FT_{39}	—	December 8, 2010	Kitt Peak	Spacewatch	DOR	2.7 km	MPC · JPL
367999	2012 FE_{42}	—	January 1, 2008	Kitt Peak	Spacewatch	·	910 m	MPC · JPL
368000	2012 FK_{44}	—	December 4, 2011	Haleakala	Pan-STARRS 1	·	3.0 km	MPC · JPL

back to top

== See also ==
- Meanings of minor-planet names: 367001–368000
