= Meanings of minor-planet names: 367001–368000 =

As minor planet discoveries are confirmed, they are given a permanent number by the IAU's Minor Planet Center (MPC), and the discoverers can then submit names for them, following the IAU's naming conventions. The list below concerns those minor planets in the specified number-range that have received names, and explains the meanings of those names.

Official naming citations of newly named small Solar System bodies are approved and published in a bulletin by IAU's Working Group for Small Bodies Nomenclature (WGSBN). Before May 2021, citations were published in MPC's Minor Planet Circulars for many decades. Recent citations can also be found on the JPL Small-Body Database (SBDB). Until his death in 2016, German astronomer Lutz D. Schmadel compiled these citations into the Dictionary of Minor Planet Names (DMP) and regularly updated the collection.

Based on Paul Herget's The Names of the Minor Planets, Schmadel also researched the unclear origin of numerous asteroids, most of which had been named prior to World War II. This article incorporates text from this source, which is in the public domain: SBDB New namings may only be added to this list below after official publication as the preannouncement of names is condemned. The WGSBN publishes a comprehensive guideline for the naming rules of non-cometary small Solar System bodies.

== 367001–367100 ==
Named minor planet	Provisional	This minor planet was named for...	Ref · Catalog
There are no named minor planets in this number range

== 367101–367200 ==
back to top

Named minor planet	Provisional	This minor planet was named for...	Ref · Catalog
There are no named minor planets in this number range

== 367201–367300 ==
back to top

Named minor planet	Provisional	This minor planet was named for...	Ref · Catalog
367228 Johannahaslehner	2007 GZ_{4}	Johanna Haslehner, Austrian teacher of geography and economic education, mathematics and English.	IAU · 367228

== 367301–367400 ==
back to top

Named minor planet	Provisional	This minor planet was named for...	Ref · Catalog
367392 Zeri	2008 OX_{9}	Federico Zeri (1921–1998) was an Italian art historian and expert in Italian Renaissance painting, known for his art collections, newspaper contributions and TV appearances.	IAU · 367392

== 367401–367500 ==
back to top

Named minor planet	Provisional	This minor planet was named for...	Ref · Catalog
367404 Andreasrebers	2008 QX_{18}	Andreas Rebers (born 1958) is a German award-winning cabaret artist, author and musician. He is well known for his satirical stage performances.	JPL · 367404
367406 Buser	2008 QK_{23}	Elisabeth Buser (born 1959) has been operating a sewing workshop for women from a nearby center for asylum seekers at her home in Winterthur-Hegi for over 10 years. She does this volunteer work on her own initiative. As a mother of six children, she also works as a lollipop lady, helping school children cross the road safely.	JPL · 367406
367436 Siena	2008 SM_{83}	Siena, an Italian city in the region of Tuscany.	JPL · 367436
367488 Aloisortner	2009 GR_{2}	Alois Ortner (1938–2019), an optician and amateur astronomer.	JPL · 367488

== 367501–367600 ==
back to top

Named minor planet	Provisional	This minor planet was named for...	Ref · Catalog
There are no named minor planets in this number range

== 367601–367700 ==
back to top

Named minor planet	Provisional	This minor planet was named for...	Ref · Catalog
367633 Shargorodskij	2009 VC_{75}	Victor Daniilovich Shargorodskij (born 1939), a well-known Russian expert in the field of quantum-optical systems.	JPL · 367633
367693 Montmagastrell	2010 RZ_{109}	The Catalan village of Santa Maria de Montmagastrell in Spain, and home to the Santa Maria de Montmagastrell Observatory (B74)	JPL · 367693

== 367701–367800 ==
back to top

Named minor planet	Provisional	This minor planet was named for...	Ref · Catalog
367732 Mikesimonsen	2005 JX_{1}	Mike Simonsen (born 1956), a musician, accomplished horticulturalist, popularizer of astronomy, and a leader in the study of variable stars	JPL · 367732

== 367801–367900 ==
back to top

Named minor planet	Provisional	This minor planet was named for...	Ref · Catalog
There are no named minor planets in this number range

== 367901–368000 ==
back to top

Named minor planet	Provisional	This minor planet was named for...	Ref · Catalog
367943 Duende	2012 DA_{14}	The Duende, a race of fairy or goblin-like mythological creature from Iberian folklore.	JPL · 367943

back to top

Preceded by 366,001–367,000	Meanings of minor-planet names List of minor planets: 367,001–368,000	Succeeded by 368,001–369,000
