= Meanings of minor-planet names: 366001–367000 =

As minor planet discoveries are confirmed, they are given a permanent number by the IAU's Minor Planet Center (MPC), and the discoverers can then submit names for them, following the IAU's naming conventions. The list below concerns those minor planets in the specified number-range that have received names, and explains the meanings of those names.

Official naming citations of newly named small Solar System bodies are approved and published in a bulletin by IAU's Working Group for Small Bodies Nomenclature (WGSBN). Before May 2021, citations were published in MPC's Minor Planet Circulars for many decades. Recent citations can also be found on the JPL Small-Body Database (SBDB). Until his death in 2016, German astronomer Lutz D. Schmadel compiled these citations into the Dictionary of Minor Planet Names (DMP) and regularly updated the collection.

Based on Paul Herget's The Names of the Minor Planets, Schmadel also researched the unclear origin of numerous asteroids, most of which had been named prior to World War II. This article incorporates text from this source, which is in the public domain: SBDB New namings may only be added to this list below after official publication as the preannouncement of names is condemned. The WGSBN publishes a comprehensive guideline for the naming rules of non-cometary small Solar System bodies.

== 366001–366100 ==
Named minor planet	Provisional	This minor planet was named for...	Ref · Catalog
There are no named minor planets in this number range

== 366101–366200 ==
back to top

Named minor planet	Provisional	This minor planet was named for...	Ref · Catalog
There are no named minor planets in this number range

== 366201–366300 ==
back to top

Named minor planet	Provisional	This minor planet was named for...	Ref · Catalog
366252 Evanmillsap	2012 XJ_{151}	Evan D. Millsap (1992–2019) was a passionate geologist and aspiring paleontologist. He was a well traveled citizen of the world and accomplished mountaineer. Evan had a love of family, culture, science, and deep time.	IAU · 366252
366272 Medellín	2013 AB_{39}	Medellín, the second largest city in Colombia and is a financial, commercial and industrial center.	JPL · 366272

== 366301–366400 ==
back to top

Named minor planet	Provisional	This minor planet was named for...	Ref · Catalog
There are no named minor planets in this number range

== 366401–366500 ==
back to top

Named minor planet	Provisional	This minor planet was named for...	Ref · Catalog
366487 Neilyoung	2002 NM_{57}	Neil Percival Young (born 1945), Canadian-American musician, singer and songwriter.	JPL · 366487

== 366501–366600 ==
back to top

Named minor planet	Provisional	This minor planet was named for...	Ref · Catalog
There are no named minor planets in this number range

== 366601–366700 ==
back to top

Named minor planet	Provisional	This minor planet was named for...	Ref · Catalog
366689 Rohrbaugh	2003 UM_{300}	Catherine Rohrbaugh is a 7th grade science teacher at Dillard Drive Middle School in Raleigh, North Carolina.	JPL · 366689

== 366701–366800 ==
back to top

Named minor planet	Provisional	This minor planet was named for...	Ref · Catalog
There are no named minor planets in this number range

== 366801–366900 ==
back to top

Named minor planet	Provisional	This minor planet was named for...	Ref · Catalog
366852 Ti	2005 RL_{9}	Teresa ("Ti") Lacruz Martin (born 1954) is the eldest sister of the Spanish discoverer Juan Lacruz. She is a law graduate of the Universidad Complutense de Madrid, and she works as Senior Director of Environment, Health and Safety & Ethics at General Dynamics European Land Systems.	JPL · 366852

== 366901–367000 ==
back to top

Named minor planet	Provisional	This minor planet was named for...	Ref · Catalog
There are no named minor planets in this number range

back to top

Preceded by 365,001–366,000	Meanings of minor-planet names List of minor planets: 366,001–367,000	Succeeded by 367,001–368,000
