= List of minor planets: 366001–367000 =

The following is a partial list of minor planets, running from minor-planet number 366001 through 367000, inclusive. The primary data for this and other partial lists is based on JPL's "Small-Body Orbital Elements" and data available from the Minor Planet Center. Critical list information is also provided by the MPC, unless otherwise specified from Lowell Observatory. A detailed description of the table's columns and additional sources are given on the main page including a complete list of every page in this series, and a statistical break-up on the dynamical classification of minor planets.

Also see the summary list of all named bodies in numerical and alphabetical order, and the corresponding naming citations for the number range of this particular list. New namings may only be added to this list after official publication, as the preannouncement of names is condemned by the Working Group for Small Bodies Nomenclature of the International Astronomical Union.

Near-Earth obj.	MBA (inner)	MBA (outer)	Centaur
Mars-crosser	MBA (middle)	Jupiter trojan	Trans-Neptunian obj.
Unclassified

== 366001–366100 ==
Designation			Discovery			Properties		Ref
Permanent	Provisional	Named after	Date	Site	Discoverer(s)	Category	Diam.	Ref
366001	2012 BT_{100}	—	December 24, 2006	Kitt Peak	Spacewatch	KOR	1.4 km	MPC · JPL
366002	2012 BB_{101}	—	November 12, 2005	Kitt Peak	Spacewatch	·	1.8 km	MPC · JPL
366003	2012 BJ_{102}	—	November 27, 2006	Mount Lemmon	Mount Lemmon Survey	·	2.0 km	MPC · JPL
366004	2012 BV_{102}	—	November 12, 2006	Mount Lemmon	Mount Lemmon Survey	·	1.9 km	MPC · JPL
366005	2012 BO_{103}	—	March 6, 2008	Mount Lemmon	Mount Lemmon Survey	PAD	1.9 km	MPC · JPL
366006	2012 BF_{107}	—	November 6, 2010	Mount Lemmon	Mount Lemmon Survey	·	3.2 km	MPC · JPL
366007	2012 BB_{109}	—	January 23, 2006	Mount Lemmon	Mount Lemmon Survey	·	3.6 km	MPC · JPL
366008	2012 BQ_{109}	—	December 27, 2005	Kitt Peak	Spacewatch	·	3.2 km	MPC · JPL
366009	2012 BA_{113}	—	January 19, 2012	Haleakala	Pan-STARRS 1	EOS	2.3 km	MPC · JPL
366010	2012 BQ_{118}	—	February 13, 2008	Kitt Peak	Spacewatch	·	2.1 km	MPC · JPL
366011	2012 BY_{120}	—	December 4, 2007	Mount Lemmon	Mount Lemmon Survey	HNS	1.2 km	MPC · JPL
366012	2012 BR_{126}	—	October 19, 2003	Palomar	NEAT	·	1.3 km	MPC · JPL
366013	2012 BU_{126}	—	January 29, 2012	Kitt Peak	Spacewatch	·	3.1 km	MPC · JPL
366014	2012 BP_{127}	—	December 27, 2006	Mount Lemmon	Mount Lemmon Survey	·	5.7 km	MPC · JPL
366015	2012 BH_{128}	—	January 26, 2000	Kitt Peak	Spacewatch	·	3.2 km	MPC · JPL
366016	2012 BK_{128}	—	September 18, 2009	Mount Lemmon	Mount Lemmon Survey	·	3.0 km	MPC · JPL
366017	2012 BW_{129}	—	January 21, 2001	Socorro	LINEAR	·	4.0 km	MPC · JPL
366018	2012 BZ_{129}	—	February 3, 2008	Catalina	CSS	·	2.0 km	MPC · JPL
366019	2012 BC_{130}	—	November 13, 2006	Catalina	CSS	·	1.9 km	MPC · JPL
366020	2012 BL_{130}	—	December 4, 2005	Kitt Peak	Spacewatch	·	3.2 km	MPC · JPL
366021	2012 BP_{130}	—	December 19, 2003	Socorro	LINEAR	PHO	1.2 km	MPC · JPL
366022	2012 BR_{133}	—	December 5, 2005	Kitt Peak	Spacewatch	·	3.7 km	MPC · JPL
366023	2012 BZ_{133}	—	November 22, 2006	Kitt Peak	Spacewatch	WAT	2.4 km	MPC · JPL
366024	2012 BE_{135}	—	December 25, 2005	Kitt Peak	Spacewatch	·	2.4 km	MPC · JPL
366025	2012 BC_{136}	—	December 3, 2007	Kitt Peak	Spacewatch	·	1.5 km	MPC · JPL
366026	2012 BR_{138}	—	March 11, 2007	Kitt Peak	Spacewatch	(159)	2.7 km	MPC · JPL
366027	2012 BD_{139}	—	September 20, 2009	Mount Lemmon	Mount Lemmon Survey	·	3.2 km	MPC · JPL
366028	2012 BR_{139}	—	August 26, 2005	Palomar	NEAT	WIT	1.1 km	MPC · JPL
366029	2012 BU_{139}	—	November 10, 2005	Mount Lemmon	Mount Lemmon Survey	HYG	3.1 km	MPC · JPL
366030	2012 BA_{143}	—	September 5, 1999	Kitt Peak	Spacewatch	·	2.0 km	MPC · JPL
366031	2012 BX_{143}	—	April 21, 2004	Catalina	CSS	·	2.5 km	MPC · JPL
366032	2012 BV_{144}	—	November 26, 2005	Mount Lemmon	Mount Lemmon Survey	KOR	1.3 km	MPC · JPL
366033	2012 BO_{147}	—	October 5, 2005	Kitt Peak	Spacewatch	·	1.9 km	MPC · JPL
366034	2012 BO_{148}	—	March 12, 2008	Kitt Peak	Spacewatch	MRX	1.0 km	MPC · JPL
366035	2012 BC_{149}	—	January 21, 2012	Kitt Peak	Spacewatch	·	2.4 km	MPC · JPL
366036	2012 BF_{149}	—	February 26, 2007	Mount Lemmon	Mount Lemmon Survey	·	2.7 km	MPC · JPL
366037	2012 BZ_{149}	—	March 11, 2007	Kitt Peak	Spacewatch	·	3.1 km	MPC · JPL
366038	2012 BC_{151}	—	October 24, 2005	Kitt Peak	Spacewatch	·	2.0 km	MPC · JPL
366039	2012 BZ_{151}	—	February 2, 2008	Mount Lemmon	Mount Lemmon Survey	·	1.5 km	MPC · JPL
366040	2012 BN_{152}	—	November 4, 1999	Kitt Peak	Spacewatch	HYG	3.0 km	MPC · JPL
366041	2012 CX	—	November 16, 2006	Catalina	CSS	·	2.3 km	MPC · JPL
366042	2012 CS_{1}	—	October 5, 2005	Kitt Peak	Spacewatch	·	2.1 km	MPC · JPL
366043	2012 CJ_{5}	—	July 13, 2010	WISE	WISE	·	4.2 km	MPC · JPL
366044	2012 CL_{5}	—	September 19, 2006	Catalina	CSS	·	1.9 km	MPC · JPL
366045	2012 CO_{5}	—	October 28, 2005	Mount Lemmon	Mount Lemmon Survey	(5931)	4.3 km	MPC · JPL
366046	2012 CR_{7}	—	July 5, 2003	Kitt Peak	Spacewatch	·	3.6 km	MPC · JPL
366047	2012 CX_{7}	—	April 24, 2008	Mount Lemmon	Mount Lemmon Survey	AGN	1.2 km	MPC · JPL
366048	2012 CY_{8}	—	February 2, 2008	Mount Lemmon	Mount Lemmon Survey	·	1.8 km	MPC · JPL
366049	2012 CJ_{9}	—	December 28, 2005	Mount Lemmon	Mount Lemmon Survey	·	2.8 km	MPC · JPL
366050	2012 CZ_{10}	—	January 4, 2006	Mount Lemmon	Mount Lemmon Survey	·	3.2 km	MPC · JPL
366051	2012 CA_{11}	—	February 21, 2007	Kitt Peak	Spacewatch	THM	2.3 km	MPC · JPL
366052	2012 CD_{11}	—	October 29, 2010	Mount Lemmon	Mount Lemmon Survey	·	2.5 km	MPC · JPL
366053	2012 CZ_{12}	—	December 2, 2010	Mount Lemmon	Mount Lemmon Survey	·	2.3 km	MPC · JPL
366054	2012 CP_{13}	—	April 11, 2007	Catalina	CSS	·	3.9 km	MPC · JPL
366055	2012 CS_{13}	—	October 7, 2004	Kitt Peak	Spacewatch	·	3.1 km	MPC · JPL
366056	2012 CP_{16}	—	December 27, 2005	Kitt Peak	Spacewatch	·	4.2 km	MPC · JPL
366057	2012 CD_{19}	—	February 10, 2007	Catalina	CSS	·	2.5 km	MPC · JPL
366058	2012 CA_{25}	—	July 25, 2003	Palomar	NEAT	·	3.3 km	MPC · JPL
366059	2012 CX_{25}	—	August 17, 2009	Kitt Peak	Spacewatch	EOS	2.2 km	MPC · JPL
366060	2012 CH_{28}	—	June 25, 1998	Kitt Peak	Spacewatch	·	1.3 km	MPC · JPL
366061	2012 CG_{29}	—	January 15, 2007	Anderson Mesa	LONEOS	615	1.9 km	MPC · JPL
366062	2012 CF_{30}	—	April 3, 2008	Mount Lemmon	Mount Lemmon Survey	·	2.8 km	MPC · JPL
366063	2012 CF_{32}	—	October 1, 2005	Mount Lemmon	Mount Lemmon Survey	·	2.2 km	MPC · JPL
366064	2012 CO_{33}	—	September 17, 2006	Kitt Peak	Spacewatch	(5)	1.4 km	MPC · JPL
366065	2012 CP_{35}	—	November 3, 2010	Kitt Peak	Spacewatch	·	2.0 km	MPC · JPL
366066	2012 CV_{35}	—	August 8, 1996	La Silla	E. W. Elst	·	980 m	MPC · JPL
366067	2012 CK_{36}	—	November 2, 2005	Mount Lemmon	Mount Lemmon Survey	·	2.1 km	MPC · JPL
366068	2012 CK_{37}	—	November 11, 2005	Kitt Peak	Spacewatch	·	2.1 km	MPC · JPL
366069	2012 CC_{38}	—	November 17, 2006	Mount Lemmon	Mount Lemmon Survey	·	2.4 km	MPC · JPL
366070	2012 CL_{38}	—	December 20, 1995	Kitt Peak	Spacewatch	·	2.8 km	MPC · JPL
366071	2012 CF_{39}	—	April 24, 2008	Mount Lemmon	Mount Lemmon Survey	·	1.6 km	MPC · JPL
366072	2012 CK_{39}	—	February 17, 2007	Mount Lemmon	Mount Lemmon Survey	EOS	2.4 km	MPC · JPL
366073	2012 CQ_{39}	—	December 15, 2006	Mount Lemmon	Mount Lemmon Survey	·	2.2 km	MPC · JPL
366074	2012 CR_{39}	—	March 10, 2008	Mount Lemmon	Mount Lemmon Survey	·	2.2 km	MPC · JPL
366075	2012 CS_{39}	—	November 11, 2010	Mount Lemmon	Mount Lemmon Survey	THM	2.2 km	MPC · JPL
366076	2012 CU_{41}	—	April 4, 2008	Kitt Peak	Spacewatch	·	1.8 km	MPC · JPL
366077	2012 CW_{41}	—	March 24, 2003	Kitt Peak	Spacewatch	·	2.1 km	MPC · JPL
366078	2012 CX_{41}	—	April 22, 2009	Mount Lemmon	Mount Lemmon Survey	·	2.7 km	MPC · JPL
366079	2012 CB_{42}	—	September 19, 2003	Kitt Peak	Spacewatch	TIR	3.5 km	MPC · JPL
366080	2012 CO_{42}	—	February 26, 2007	Mount Lemmon	Mount Lemmon Survey	·	3.2 km	MPC · JPL
366081	2012 CC_{43}	—	November 30, 1999	Kitt Peak	Spacewatch	·	3.3 km	MPC · JPL
366082	2012 CE_{43}	—	December 2, 2005	Kitt Peak	Spacewatch	·	3.2 km	MPC · JPL
366083	2012 CF_{43}	—	November 4, 2005	Mount Lemmon	Mount Lemmon Survey	·	2.6 km	MPC · JPL
366084	2012 CB_{44}	—	October 5, 2004	Kitt Peak	Spacewatch	·	2.9 km	MPC · JPL
366085	2012 CM_{45}	—	March 6, 1999	Kitt Peak	Spacewatch	·	2.0 km	MPC · JPL
366086	2012 CS_{45}	—	February 9, 2007	Kitt Peak	Spacewatch	·	2.7 km	MPC · JPL
366087	2012 CC_{46}	—	July 30, 2005	Palomar	NEAT	·	1.8 km	MPC · JPL
366088	2012 CD_{46}	—	December 30, 2005	Kitt Peak	Spacewatch	·	3.5 km	MPC · JPL
366089	2012 CF_{46}	—	August 23, 2003	Palomar	NEAT	·	3.5 km	MPC · JPL
366090	2012 CR_{47}	—	March 20, 1999	Apache Point	SDSS	·	2.6 km	MPC · JPL
366091	2012 CN_{48}	—	March 19, 2007	Mount Lemmon	Mount Lemmon Survey	·	2.7 km	MPC · JPL
366092	2012 CE_{51}	—	November 30, 2010	Mount Lemmon	Mount Lemmon Survey	·	2.2 km	MPC · JPL
366093	2012 CQ_{51}	—	October 28, 2006	Catalina	CSS	·	1.9 km	MPC · JPL
366094	2012 CG_{52}	—	April 16, 2007	Catalina	CSS	·	3.1 km	MPC · JPL
366095	2012 CL_{54}	—	November 19, 2006	Catalina	CSS	·	1.8 km	MPC · JPL
366096	2012 CQ_{55}	—	September 11, 2004	Kitt Peak	Spacewatch	·	2.5 km	MPC · JPL
366097	2012 CX_{56}	—	January 23, 2004	Socorro	LINEAR	·	1.9 km	MPC · JPL
366098	2012 CG_{57}	—	March 14, 2007	Anderson Mesa	LONEOS	·	4.9 km	MPC · JPL
366099	2012 DA_{5}	—	July 20, 2009	Siding Spring	SSS	NYS	1.4 km	MPC · JPL
366100	2012 DG_{7}	—	March 5, 2008	Mount Lemmon	Mount Lemmon Survey	WIT	1.1 km	MPC · JPL

== 366101–366200 ==
back to top

Designation			Discovery			Properties		Ref
Permanent	Provisional	Named after	Date	Site	Discoverer(s)	Category	Diam.	Ref
366101	2012 DR_{7}	—	November 12, 2010	Mount Lemmon	Mount Lemmon Survey	EOS	2.3 km	MPC · JPL
366102	2012 DL_{9}	—	January 23, 2006	Mount Lemmon	Mount Lemmon Survey	·	3.4 km	MPC · JPL
366103	2012 DF_{11}	—	March 10, 2008	Catalina	CSS	·	1.8 km	MPC · JPL
366104	2012 DP_{11}	—	March 10, 2007	Mount Lemmon	Mount Lemmon Survey	EOS	2.0 km	MPC · JPL
366105	2012 DE_{13}	—	April 25, 2007	Mount Lemmon	Mount Lemmon Survey	T_{j} (2.96)	3.6 km	MPC · JPL
366106	2012 DZ_{15}	—	September 17, 2004	Anderson Mesa	LONEOS	·	3.1 km	MPC · JPL
366107	2012 DG_{17}	—	October 29, 2003	Kitt Peak	Spacewatch	CYB	5.6 km	MPC · JPL
366108	2012 DR_{22}	—	February 17, 2007	Mount Lemmon	Mount Lemmon Survey	·	2.2 km	MPC · JPL
366109	2012 DT_{22}	—	September 19, 1998	Apache Point	SDSS	LIX	4.4 km	MPC · JPL
366110	2012 DE_{23}	—	April 14, 1996	Kitt Peak	Spacewatch	·	3.6 km	MPC · JPL
366111	2012 DJ_{26}	—	April 19, 2007	Anderson Mesa	LONEOS	·	3.8 km	MPC · JPL
366112	2012 DP_{26}	—	March 1, 1998	Caussols	ODAS	GAL	1.7 km	MPC · JPL
366113	2012 DV_{27}	—	December 23, 2000	Apache Point	SDSS	(8737)	3.4 km	MPC · JPL
366114	2012 DF_{28}	—	January 7, 2006	Kitt Peak	Spacewatch	·	4.1 km	MPC · JPL
366115	2012 DH_{30}	—	September 19, 2003	Palomar	NEAT	·	4.3 km	MPC · JPL
366116	2012 DM_{30}	—	August 10, 2004	Campo Imperatore	CINEOS	·	3.4 km	MPC · JPL
366117	2012 DS_{31}	—	October 27, 2005	Kitt Peak	Spacewatch	·	2.4 km	MPC · JPL
366118	2012 DM_{33}	—	November 30, 2010	Catalina	CSS	·	4.1 km	MPC · JPL
366119	2012 DP_{33}	—	September 18, 2003	Palomar	NEAT	·	4.6 km	MPC · JPL
366120	2012 DZ_{33}	—	March 12, 2007	Mount Lemmon	Mount Lemmon Survey	·	2.3 km	MPC · JPL
366121	2012 DB_{44}	—	September 19, 1998	Apache Point	SDSS	·	3.3 km	MPC · JPL
366122	2012 DR_{47}	—	February 24, 2006	Catalina	CSS	·	3.7 km	MPC · JPL
366123	2012 DA_{52}	—	September 29, 2003	Kitt Peak	Spacewatch	THM	3.0 km	MPC · JPL
366124	2012 DN_{52}	—	March 14, 2007	Kitt Peak	Spacewatch	·	2.3 km	MPC · JPL
366125	2012 DE_{57}	—	November 4, 2004	Kitt Peak	Spacewatch	·	680 m	MPC · JPL
366126	2012 DT_{57}	—	September 15, 2007	Kitt Peak	Spacewatch	·	650 m	MPC · JPL
366127	2012 DS_{58}	—	March 11, 2007	Kitt Peak	Spacewatch	EOS	2.1 km	MPC · JPL
366128	2012 DP_{60}	—	September 19, 1998	Apache Point	SDSS	·	4.6 km	MPC · JPL
366129	2012 DJ_{62}	—	November 17, 1999	Kitt Peak	Spacewatch	·	2.9 km	MPC · JPL
366130	2012 DR_{63}	—	February 21, 2007	Kitt Peak	Spacewatch	·	2.7 km	MPC · JPL
366131	2012 DV_{63}	—	September 27, 1992	Kitt Peak	Spacewatch	·	1.7 km	MPC · JPL
366132	2012 DT_{64}	—	December 25, 2005	Kitt Peak	Spacewatch	·	2.1 km	MPC · JPL
366133	2012 DT_{67}	—	September 27, 2003	Kitt Peak	Spacewatch	·	890 m	MPC · JPL
366134	2012 DF_{68}	—	April 12, 2002	Palomar	NEAT	·	3.2 km	MPC · JPL
366135	2012 DZ_{71}	—	December 27, 2005	Catalina	CSS	·	2.4 km	MPC · JPL
366136	2012 DF_{75}	—	November 23, 2006	Mount Lemmon	Mount Lemmon Survey	·	2.4 km	MPC · JPL
366137	2012 DY_{77}	—	February 10, 2002	Socorro	LINEAR	·	3.4 km	MPC · JPL
366138	2012 DR_{78}	—	September 9, 2001	Palomar	NEAT	·	3.8 km	MPC · JPL
366139	2012 DD_{82}	—	August 31, 2005	Kitt Peak	Spacewatch	·	2.0 km	MPC · JPL
366140	2012 DS_{87}	—	March 7, 2005	Socorro	LINEAR	·	1.1 km	MPC · JPL
366141	2012 DJ_{90}	—	August 26, 2005	Palomar	NEAT	·	2.5 km	MPC · JPL
366142	2012 DM_{90}	—	June 29, 2005	Kitt Peak	Spacewatch	·	2.0 km	MPC · JPL
366143	2012 DN_{91}	—	August 28, 2005	Kitt Peak	Spacewatch	·	1.6 km	MPC · JPL
366144	2012 DQ_{96}	—	December 22, 2005	Catalina	CSS	·	2.1 km	MPC · JPL
366145	2012 DP_{97}	—	February 1, 2000	Kitt Peak	Spacewatch	·	4.0 km	MPC · JPL
366146	2012 DK_{98}	—	May 11, 2007	Mount Lemmon	Mount Lemmon Survey	GAL	2.3 km	MPC · JPL
366147	2012 EP_{2}	—	January 9, 2006	Kitt Peak	Spacewatch	THM	2.2 km	MPC · JPL
366148	2012 EV_{2}	—	February 26, 2007	Mount Lemmon	Mount Lemmon Survey	EOS	2.6 km	MPC · JPL
366149	2012 EC_{4}	—	October 2, 2009	Mount Lemmon	Mount Lemmon Survey	·	5.0 km	MPC · JPL
366150	2012 EC_{7}	—	September 19, 2003	Kitt Peak	Spacewatch	·	1.0 km	MPC · JPL
366151	2012 EY_{7}	—	February 20, 2006	Socorro	LINEAR	VER	4.4 km	MPC · JPL
366152	2012 EF_{11}	—	August 25, 2004	Kitt Peak	Spacewatch	·	2.3 km	MPC · JPL
366153	2012 EL_{11}	—	October 2, 2010	Mount Lemmon	Mount Lemmon Survey	EOS	2.1 km	MPC · JPL
366154	2012 EK_{15}	—	January 6, 2003	Nogales	P. R. Holvorcem, M. Schwartz	MAR	1.6 km	MPC · JPL
366155	2012 FX_{3}	—	July 8, 1997	Kitt Peak	Spacewatch	KON	2.9 km	MPC · JPL
366156	2012 FE_{5}	—	August 15, 2009	Kitt Peak	Spacewatch	·	3.4 km	MPC · JPL
366157	2012 FY_{6}	—	August 27, 2009	Kitt Peak	Spacewatch	·	2.0 km	MPC · JPL
366158	2012 FJ_{8}	—	September 10, 2004	Kitt Peak	Spacewatch	EOS	2.2 km	MPC · JPL
366159	2012 FV_{9}	—	March 10, 2007	Kitt Peak	Spacewatch	·	2.8 km	MPC · JPL
366160	2012 FG_{11}	—	July 20, 2002	Palomar	NEAT	·	4.4 km	MPC · JPL
366161	2012 FB_{23}	—	December 14, 2006	Kitt Peak	Spacewatch	EUN	1.6 km	MPC · JPL
366162	2012 FU_{25}	—	September 15, 2009	Kitt Peak	Spacewatch	·	2.8 km	MPC · JPL
366163	2012 FQ_{34}	—	August 28, 2002	Palomar	NEAT	CYB	5.1 km	MPC · JPL
366164	2012 FU_{43}	—	February 8, 2002	Kitt Peak	Spacewatch	·	3.0 km	MPC · JPL
366165	2012 FP_{48}	—	March 15, 2007	Mount Lemmon	Mount Lemmon Survey	·	3.3 km	MPC · JPL
366166	2012 FR_{58}	—	September 30, 2003	Kitt Peak	Spacewatch	·	3.4 km	MPC · JPL
366167	2012 FH_{68}	—	October 24, 2005	Mauna Kea	A. Boattini	·	2.9 km	MPC · JPL
366168	2012 FY_{75}	—	March 19, 2001	Anderson Mesa	LONEOS	·	4.5 km	MPC · JPL
366169	2012 FS_{76}	—	March 14, 1999	Kitt Peak	Spacewatch	·	1.6 km	MPC · JPL
366170	2012 FV_{79}	—	April 24, 2007	Mount Lemmon	Mount Lemmon Survey	·	3.5 km	MPC · JPL
366171	2012 FS_{81}	—	April 22, 2007	Kitt Peak	Spacewatch	EOS	2.7 km	MPC · JPL
366172	2012 FX_{81}	—	February 9, 2007	Catalina	CSS	·	3.0 km	MPC · JPL
366173	2012 FY_{82}	—	October 7, 2004	Kitt Peak	Spacewatch	·	3.3 km	MPC · JPL
366174	2012 FG_{83}	—	November 6, 2010	Catalina	CSS	·	3.4 km	MPC · JPL
366175	2012 FP_{83}	—	February 10, 1999	Socorro	LINEAR	BAR	1.8 km	MPC · JPL
366176	2012 GN_{4}	—	October 12, 2005	Kitt Peak	Spacewatch	·	2.5 km	MPC · JPL
366177	2012 GH_{24}	—	October 31, 2006	Mount Lemmon	Mount Lemmon Survey	·	1.8 km	MPC · JPL
366178	2012 GL_{29}	—	October 16, 2003	Kitt Peak	Spacewatch	·	850 m	MPC · JPL
366179	2012 GE_{34}	—	April 14, 2008	Catalina	CSS	·	1.5 km	MPC · JPL
366180	2012 GR_{39}	—	December 30, 2007	Kitt Peak	Spacewatch	·	1.4 km	MPC · JPL
366181	2012 HJ_{6}	—	October 13, 2004	Kitt Peak	Spacewatch	·	3.4 km	MPC · JPL
366182	2012 HA_{9}	—	May 10, 2007	Kitt Peak	Spacewatch	EOS	2.7 km	MPC · JPL
366183	2012 HD_{9}	—	October 24, 2003	Apache Point	SDSS	·	3.5 km	MPC · JPL
366184	2012 HE_{9}	—	October 23, 2001	Palomar	NEAT	·	2.2 km	MPC · JPL
366185	2012 HN_{11}	—	April 15, 2002	Palomar	NEAT	·	3.0 km	MPC · JPL
366186	2012 HE_{26}	—	June 2, 2006	Kitt Peak	Spacewatch	T_{j} (2.98) · CYB	5.7 km	MPC · JPL
366187	2012 HU_{27}	—	April 15, 2008	Kitt Peak	Spacewatch	·	1.2 km	MPC · JPL
366188	2012 HU_{36}	—	January 30, 2011	Kitt Peak	Spacewatch	EOS	2.2 km	MPC · JPL
366189	2012 HF_{37}	—	April 18, 2001	Kitt Peak	Spacewatch	VER	3.6 km	MPC · JPL
366190	2012 HV_{37}	—	September 11, 2002	Palomar	NEAT	TIR	4.0 km	MPC · JPL
366191	2012 HK_{42}	—	March 11, 2005	Kitt Peak	Spacewatch	·	700 m	MPC · JPL
366192	2012 HM_{48}	—	October 7, 2004	Socorro	LINEAR	·	2.9 km	MPC · JPL
366193	2012 HT_{49}	—	July 7, 2002	Kitt Peak	Spacewatch	THM	2.4 km	MPC · JPL
366194	2012 HD_{57}	—	March 5, 2006	Kitt Peak	Spacewatch	URS	3.7 km	MPC · JPL
366195	2012 HS_{58}	—	October 24, 2005	Kitt Peak	Spacewatch	·	2.0 km	MPC · JPL
366196	2012 HE_{82}	—	September 20, 2003	Kitt Peak	Spacewatch	·	5.0 km	MPC · JPL
366197	2012 JW	—	March 19, 2001	Kitt Peak	Spacewatch	·	3.2 km	MPC · JPL
366198	2012 JR_{19}	—	December 11, 2004	Kitt Peak	Spacewatch	·	3.1 km	MPC · JPL
366199	2012 JL_{26}	—	January 16, 2005	Kitt Peak	Spacewatch	T_{j} (2.99) · EUP	5.3 km	MPC · JPL
366200	2012 KT_{1}	—	December 25, 2005	Mount Lemmon	Mount Lemmon Survey	·	2.6 km	MPC · JPL

== 366201–366300 ==
back to top

Designation			Discovery			Properties		Ref
Permanent	Provisional	Named after	Date	Site	Discoverer(s)	Category	Diam.	Ref
366201	2012 KH_{23}	—	March 26, 2011	Mount Lemmon	Mount Lemmon Survey	CYB	5.1 km	MPC · JPL
366202	2012 LY_{15}	—	March 4, 2005	Mount Lemmon	Mount Lemmon Survey	·	2.9 km	MPC · JPL
366203	2012 PQ_{13}	—	August 17, 2006	Palomar	NEAT	·	4.0 km	MPC · JPL
366204	2012 QZ_{31}	—	December 4, 2005	Kitt Peak	Spacewatch	·	2.8 km	MPC · JPL
366205	2012 RX_{7}	—	September 23, 2008	Catalina	CSS	EUN	1.6 km	MPC · JPL
366206	2012 RX_{11}	—	December 7, 1996	Kitt Peak	Spacewatch	·	3.9 km	MPC · JPL
366207	2012 RJ_{24}	—	September 6, 2008	Catalina	CSS	·	1.3 km	MPC · JPL
366208	2012 RW_{28}	—	March 11, 2007	Kitt Peak	Spacewatch	·	1.4 km	MPC · JPL
366209	2012 SZ_{12}	—	May 2, 2001	Kitt Peak	Spacewatch	·	820 m	MPC · JPL
366210	2012 SX_{59}	—	October 13, 2007	Mount Lemmon	Mount Lemmon Survey	·	3.1 km	MPC · JPL
366211	2012 TF_{13}	—	February 2, 2006	Mount Lemmon	Mount Lemmon Survey	·	1.4 km	MPC · JPL
366212	2012 TT_{23}	—	January 19, 2004	Kitt Peak	Spacewatch	·	3.7 km	MPC · JPL
366213	2012 TY_{30}	—	November 18, 2001	Socorro	LINEAR	·	1.8 km	MPC · JPL
366214	2012 TN_{32}	—	March 21, 2001	Kitt Peak	Spacewatch	·	820 m	MPC · JPL
366215	2012 TM_{89}	—	August 29, 2005	Anderson Mesa	LONEOS	·	740 m	MPC · JPL
366216	2012 TV_{98}	—	September 25, 1998	Kitt Peak	Spacewatch	·	1.9 km	MPC · JPL
366217	2012 TO_{166}	—	November 30, 2003	Kitt Peak	Spacewatch	AGN	1.6 km	MPC · JPL
366218	2012 TP_{184}	—	October 23, 1995	Kitt Peak	Spacewatch	·	1.3 km	MPC · JPL
366219	2012 TY_{189}	—	September 25, 2006	Kitt Peak	Spacewatch	·	3.7 km	MPC · JPL
366220	2012 TQ_{217}	—	October 3, 2005	Catalina	CSS	·	890 m	MPC · JPL
366221	2012 TH_{232}	—	November 19, 1995	Kitt Peak	Spacewatch	·	2.3 km	MPC · JPL
366222	2012 TQ_{232}	—	April 28, 2004	Kitt Peak	Spacewatch	·	1.1 km	MPC · JPL
366223	2012 TV_{238}	—	May 22, 2006	Kitt Peak	Spacewatch	·	2.6 km	MPC · JPL
366224	2012 TF_{242}	—	June 9, 1999	Kitt Peak	Spacewatch	·	3.3 km	MPC · JPL
366225	2012 TA_{287}	—	May 12, 2005	Bergisch Gladbach	W. Bickel	·	2.5 km	MPC · JPL
366226	2012 TU_{298}	—	November 1, 2007	Kitt Peak	Spacewatch	·	2.5 km	MPC · JPL
366227	2012 TT_{303}	—	September 19, 2001	Socorro	LINEAR	·	2.5 km	MPC · JPL
366228	2012 UQ_{7}	—	November 28, 1999	Kitt Peak	Spacewatch	·	680 m	MPC · JPL
366229	2012 UT_{85}	—	October 17, 2003	Kitt Peak	Spacewatch	ADE	2.6 km	MPC · JPL
366230	2012 UZ_{85}	—	October 15, 2001	Kitt Peak	Spacewatch	·	2.7 km	MPC · JPL
366231	2012 UC_{91}	—	March 13, 2010	Kitt Peak	Spacewatch	·	4.1 km	MPC · JPL
366232	2012 UD_{93}	—	October 26, 2005	Anderson Mesa	LONEOS	·	1.2 km	MPC · JPL
366233	2012 UY_{108}	—	August 30, 2005	Kitt Peak	Spacewatch	·	860 m	MPC · JPL
366234	2012 UZ_{122}	—	November 9, 2007	Kitt Peak	Spacewatch	·	2.5 km	MPC · JPL
366235	2012 US_{141}	—	March 8, 2003	St. Véran	Matter, D., C. Demeautis	·	1.3 km	MPC · JPL
366236	2012 UE_{145}	—	November 5, 2007	Mount Lemmon	Mount Lemmon Survey	·	2.4 km	MPC · JPL
366237	2012 UV_{154}	—	October 24, 1998	Kitt Peak	Spacewatch	HOF	3.0 km	MPC · JPL
366238	2012 UX_{155}	—	September 19, 2006	Kitt Peak	Spacewatch	·	2.6 km	MPC · JPL
366239	2012 UJ_{160}	—	December 11, 2004	Kitt Peak	Spacewatch	·	1.4 km	MPC · JPL
366240	2012 UF_{167}	—	June 22, 2004	Kitt Peak	Spacewatch	V	950 m	MPC · JPL
366241	2012 VF_{24}	—	October 20, 2003	Kitt Peak	Spacewatch	·	1.8 km	MPC · JPL
366242	2012 VZ_{32}	—	March 24, 2001	Kitt Peak	Spacewatch	·	740 m	MPC · JPL
366243	2012 VE_{69}	—	January 16, 2004	Kitt Peak	Spacewatch	KOR	1.2 km	MPC · JPL
366244	2012 VQ_{73}	—	April 1, 2003	Apache Point	SDSS	TIR	2.7 km	MPC · JPL
366245	2012 WW_{31}	—	November 7, 2008	Mount Lemmon	Mount Lemmon Survey	·	1.6 km	MPC · JPL
366246	2012 XY_{2}	—	October 2, 2006	Catalina	CSS	·	4.4 km	MPC · JPL
366247	2012 XW_{16}	—	May 24, 2011	Mount Lemmon	Mount Lemmon Survey	H	660 m	MPC · JPL
366248	2012 XH_{27}	—	April 13, 2004	Kitt Peak	Spacewatch	·	3.4 km	MPC · JPL
366249	2012 XO_{31}	—	October 25, 2005	Mount Lemmon	Mount Lemmon Survey	·	720 m	MPC · JPL
366250	2012 XJ_{103}	—	September 16, 2006	Anderson Mesa	LONEOS	·	4.1 km	MPC · JPL
366251	2012 XN_{140}	—	September 28, 2001	Palomar	NEAT	EOS	3.8 km	MPC · JPL
366252 Evanmillsap	2012 XJ_{151}	Evanmillsap	November 8, 2007	Catalina	CSS	·	2.7 km	MPC · JPL
366253	2012 YS_{2}	—	April 9, 2003	Kitt Peak	Spacewatch	L4	10 km	MPC · JPL
366254	2012 YY_{2}	—	November 21, 1998	Kitt Peak	Spacewatch	L4	8.1 km	MPC · JPL
366255	2012 YB_{4}	—	October 5, 1994	Kitt Peak	Spacewatch	·	4.4 km	MPC · JPL
366256	2012 YO_{7}	—	May 13, 2009	Kitt Peak	Spacewatch	·	2.9 km	MPC · JPL
366257	2013 AB	—	January 15, 2005	Catalina	CSS	·	1.5 km	MPC · JPL
366258	2013 AU	—	January 7, 2005	Catalina	CSS	H	680 m	MPC · JPL
366259	2013 AA_{7}	—	October 18, 2006	Kitt Peak	Spacewatch	·	2.9 km	MPC · JPL
366260	2013 AM_{7}	—	December 22, 2003	Kitt Peak	Spacewatch	·	2.3 km	MPC · JPL
366261	2013 AA_{8}	—	January 12, 2008	Mount Lemmon	Mount Lemmon Survey	·	4.6 km	MPC · JPL
366262	2013 AD_{19}	—	October 20, 2012	Mount Lemmon	Mount Lemmon Survey	L4	10 km	MPC · JPL
366263	2013 AW_{21}	—	February 4, 2002	Palomar	NEAT	·	2.7 km	MPC · JPL
366264	2013 AM_{22}	—	October 2, 2009	Mount Lemmon	Mount Lemmon Survey	L4	10 km	MPC · JPL
366265	2013 AA_{25}	—	January 6, 2002	Palomar	NEAT	V	1.1 km	MPC · JPL
366266	2013 AR_{33}	—	February 2, 2006	Kitt Peak	Spacewatch	·	1.4 km	MPC · JPL
366267	2013 AX_{36}	—	February 21, 2009	Catalina	CSS	·	1.8 km	MPC · JPL
366268	2013 AA_{37}	—	June 2, 2003	Kitt Peak	Spacewatch	·	4.5 km	MPC · JPL
366269	2013 AN_{37}	—	May 13, 2004	Kitt Peak	Spacewatch	L4	8.6 km	MPC · JPL
366270	2013 AP_{38}	—	October 18, 2003	Palomar	NEAT	·	1.6 km	MPC · JPL
366271	2013 AS_{38}	—	May 10, 1996	Kitt Peak	Spacewatch	NYS	860 m	MPC · JPL
366272 Medellín	2013 AB_{39}	Medellín	March 30, 2003	Mérida	I. Ferrin, C. Leal	·	6.4 km	MPC · JPL
366273	2013 AN_{41}	—	November 25, 2002	Palomar	NEAT	·	2.9 km	MPC · JPL
366274	2013 AZ_{55}	—	October 4, 2004	Kitt Peak	Spacewatch	·	1.5 km	MPC · JPL
366275	2013 AK_{59}	—	February 26, 2003	Bergisch Gladbach	W. Bickel	·	740 m	MPC · JPL
366276	2013 AK_{73}	—	October 23, 2003	Apache Point	SDSS	·	1.6 km	MPC · JPL
366277	2013 AQ_{73}	—	January 30, 2006	Catalina	CSS	·	970 m	MPC · JPL
366278	2013 AR_{74}	—	June 18, 2010	Mount Lemmon	Mount Lemmon Survey	·	4.6 km	MPC · JPL
366279	2013 AD_{91}	—	March 3, 2000	Catalina	CSS	fast	2.1 km	MPC · JPL
366280	2013 AS_{99}	—	October 3, 2006	Mount Lemmon	Mount Lemmon Survey	·	2.7 km	MPC · JPL
366281	2013 AA_{103}	—	April 21, 2010	WISE	WISE	VER	4.0 km	MPC · JPL
366282	2013 AM_{105}	—	January 13, 2005	Kitt Peak	Spacewatch	·	1.3 km	MPC · JPL
366283	2013 AR_{105}	—	February 29, 2008	Kitt Peak	Spacewatch	·	4.4 km	MPC · JPL
366284	2013 AM_{125}	—	October 21, 2007	Catalina	CSS	·	2.4 km	MPC · JPL
366285	2013 AF_{130}	—	November 4, 2005	Kitt Peak	Spacewatch	·	690 m	MPC · JPL
366286	2013 AS_{130}	—	September 13, 2005	Kitt Peak	Spacewatch	·	3.4 km	MPC · JPL
366287	2013 AR_{132}	—	September 6, 2008	Kitt Peak	Spacewatch	L4	9.8 km	MPC · JPL
366288	2013 BA_{5}	—	November 18, 2003	Kitt Peak	Spacewatch	·	1.6 km	MPC · JPL
366289	2013 BN_{24}	—	December 23, 2001	Kitt Peak	Spacewatch	·	3.5 km	MPC · JPL
366290	2013 BW_{33}	—	August 28, 2006	Kitt Peak	Spacewatch	·	2.0 km	MPC · JPL
366291	2013 BZ_{40}	—	December 22, 2003	Kitt Peak	Spacewatch	·	2.0 km	MPC · JPL
366292	2013 BK_{41}	—	February 7, 2002	Socorro	LINEAR	NYS	1.5 km	MPC · JPL
366293	2013 BB_{43}	—	September 29, 2005	Kitt Peak	Spacewatch	·	4.1 km	MPC · JPL
366294	2013 BE_{63}	—	January 22, 2002	Kitt Peak	Spacewatch	·	1.3 km	MPC · JPL
366295	2013 BJ_{66}	—	April 19, 2006	Mount Lemmon	Mount Lemmon Survey	MAS	720 m	MPC · JPL
366296	2013 BU_{77}	—	March 11, 2005	Kitt Peak	Spacewatch	·	1.5 km	MPC · JPL
366297	2013 BW_{79}	—	August 31, 2005	Kitt Peak	Spacewatch	·	3.9 km	MPC · JPL
366298	2013 CF_{3}	—	September 23, 2000	Socorro	LINEAR	·	1.5 km	MPC · JPL
366299	2013 CQ_{14}	—	March 3, 2006	Catalina	CSS	·	1.3 km	MPC · JPL
366300	2013 CN_{19}	—	February 3, 2008	Kitt Peak	Spacewatch	·	3.5 km	MPC · JPL

== 366301–366400 ==
back to top

Designation			Discovery			Properties		Ref
Permanent	Provisional	Named after	Date	Site	Discoverer(s)	Category	Diam.	Ref
366301	2013 CM_{22}	—	June 6, 2010	WISE	WISE	·	4.4 km	MPC · JPL
366302	2013 CQ_{22}	—	December 31, 2008	Mount Lemmon	Mount Lemmon Survey	·	1.8 km	MPC · JPL
366303	2013 CY_{22}	—	November 15, 2007	Mount Lemmon	Mount Lemmon Survey	·	2.3 km	MPC · JPL
366304	2013 CC_{38}	—	May 3, 2008	Kitt Peak	Spacewatch	·	3.3 km	MPC · JPL
366305	2013 CH_{67}	—	October 1, 2005	Catalina	CSS	·	3.3 km	MPC · JPL
366306	2013 CK_{72}	—	July 26, 2003	Palomar	NEAT	·	1.5 km	MPC · JPL
366307	2013 CR_{84}	—	March 3, 2006	Mount Lemmon	Mount Lemmon Survey	CYB	4.4 km	MPC · JPL
366308	2013 CV_{109}	—	January 8, 2002	Kitt Peak	Spacewatch	EOS	2.3 km	MPC · JPL
366309	2013 CJ_{134}	—	November 30, 2008	Kitt Peak	Spacewatch	·	1.4 km	MPC · JPL
366310	2013 CL_{134}	—	March 11, 2002	Palomar	NEAT	T_{j} (2.98)	3.5 km	MPC · JPL
366311	2013 CM_{142}	—	March 24, 2003	Kitt Peak	Spacewatch	·	530 m	MPC · JPL
366312	2013 CO_{142}	—	February 10, 2004	Palomar	NEAT	·	2.1 km	MPC · JPL
366313	2013 CW_{174}	—	October 3, 2002	Palomar	NEAT	·	2.1 km	MPC · JPL
366314	2013 CD_{180}	—	February 16, 2004	Kitt Peak	Spacewatch	·	2.8 km	MPC · JPL
366315	2013 CN_{182}	—	January 30, 2009	Mount Lemmon	Mount Lemmon Survey	·	1.8 km	MPC · JPL
366316	2013 CW_{183}	—	May 12, 1996	Kitt Peak	Spacewatch	·	1.9 km	MPC · JPL
366317	2013 CV_{197}	—	September 4, 2008	Kitt Peak	Spacewatch	L4	7.1 km	MPC · JPL
366318	2013 CU_{206}	—	October 5, 2007	Kitt Peak	Spacewatch	·	1.4 km	MPC · JPL
366319	2013 ER_{1}	—	February 26, 2008	Mount Lemmon	Mount Lemmon Survey	KOR	1.8 km	MPC · JPL
366320	2013 EM_{5}	—	February 8, 2002	Kitt Peak	Deep Ecliptic Survey	·	3.2 km	MPC · JPL
366321	2013 EV_{5}	—	January 27, 2003	Socorro	LINEAR	·	710 m	MPC · JPL
366322	2013 EN_{12}	—	February 28, 2009	Kitt Peak	Spacewatch	·	1.2 km	MPC · JPL
366323	2013 EG_{14}	—	October 14, 2004	Kitt Peak	Spacewatch	NYS	1.2 km	MPC · JPL
366324	2013 EX_{14}	—	April 20, 2009	Mount Lemmon	Mount Lemmon Survey	·	1.6 km	MPC · JPL
366325	2013 EO_{21}	—	February 12, 2004	Kitt Peak	Spacewatch	·	1.9 km	MPC · JPL
366326	2013 EW_{39}	—	April 27, 2000	Anderson Mesa	LONEOS	slow	3.6 km	MPC · JPL
366327	2013 EJ_{74}	—	April 2, 2006	Kitt Peak	Spacewatch	3:2	5.6 km	MPC · JPL
366328	2013 EY_{85}	—	January 17, 2007	Kitt Peak	Spacewatch	VER	3.2 km	MPC · JPL
366329	2013 EO_{86}	—	January 16, 2004	Kitt Peak	Spacewatch	·	1.5 km	MPC · JPL
366330	2013 EE_{93}	—	January 29, 2004	Socorro	LINEAR	·	1.9 km	MPC · JPL
366331	2013 EO_{98}	—	October 18, 2001	Kitt Peak	Spacewatch	AGN	1.3 km	MPC · JPL
366332	2013 EK_{106}	—	May 10, 2005	Kitt Peak	Spacewatch	·	1.5 km	MPC · JPL
366333	2013 EB_{108}	—	October 19, 2003	Apache Point	SDSS	·	2.7 km	MPC · JPL
366334	2013 EA_{112}	—	October 21, 2001	Socorro	LINEAR	·	600 m	MPC · JPL
366335	2013 EZ_{119}	—	March 10, 2000	Socorro	LINEAR	·	1.8 km	MPC · JPL
366336	2013 EA_{123}	—	September 28, 1998	Kitt Peak	Spacewatch	·	570 m	MPC · JPL
366337	2013 EX_{123}	—	March 11, 2000	Socorro	LINEAR	·	1.8 km	MPC · JPL
366338	2013 FL	—	January 7, 2005	Catalina	CSS	·	1.8 km	MPC · JPL
366339	2013 FN_{12}	—	January 21, 2002	Kitt Peak	Spacewatch	·	3.5 km	MPC · JPL
366340	2013 FP_{12}	—	March 28, 2003	Kitt Peak	Spacewatch	·	920 m	MPC · JPL
366341	4082 T-2	—	September 29, 1973	Palomar	C. J. van Houten, I. van Houten-Groeneveld, T. Gehrels	MAS	800 m	MPC · JPL
366342	1993 TV_{29}	—	October 9, 1993	La Silla	E. W. Elst	·	1.8 km	MPC · JPL
366343	1994 LC_{1}	—	June 15, 1994	Siding Spring	G. J. Garradd	·	2.3 km	MPC · JPL
366344	1996 TV_{36}	—	October 12, 1996	Kitt Peak	Spacewatch	·	590 m	MPC · JPL
366345	1997 SW_{13}	—	September 28, 1997	Kitt Peak	Spacewatch	·	2.9 km	MPC · JPL
366346	1997 SQ_{24}	—	September 30, 1997	Kitt Peak	Spacewatch	·	640 m	MPC · JPL
366347	1998 OO_{2}	—	June 30, 1998	Kitt Peak	Spacewatch	·	2.6 km	MPC · JPL
366348	1998 UE_{11}	—	October 17, 1998	Kitt Peak	Spacewatch	MAS	1 km	MPC · JPL
366349	1999 RQ_{31}	—	September 5, 1999	Ondřejov	L. Kotková	·	1.0 km	MPC · JPL
366350	1999 RH_{185}	—	September 9, 1999	Socorro	LINEAR	·	1.2 km	MPC · JPL
366351	1999 TO_{11}	—	October 8, 1999	Kleť	Kleť	·	800 m	MPC · JPL
366352	1999 TQ_{29}	—	October 4, 1999	Socorro	LINEAR	·	940 m	MPC · JPL
366353	1999 TY_{75}	—	October 10, 1999	Kitt Peak	Spacewatch	·	3.2 km	MPC · JPL
366354	1999 TV_{165}	—	October 10, 1999	Socorro	LINEAR	·	2.2 km	MPC · JPL
366355	1999 UU_{7}	—	October 29, 1999	Catalina	CSS	·	1.8 km	MPC · JPL
366356	1999 UV_{52}	—	October 31, 1999	Catalina	CSS	·	2.0 km	MPC · JPL
366357	1999 VZ_{83}	—	November 3, 1999	Kitt Peak	Spacewatch	MAS	690 m	MPC · JPL
366358	1999 WX_{25}	—	November 29, 1999	Kitt Peak	Spacewatch	NYS	860 m	MPC · JPL
366359	2000 AY_{109}	—	January 5, 2000	Socorro	LINEAR	·	1.4 km	MPC · JPL
366360	2000 AN_{217}	—	January 8, 2000	Kitt Peak	Spacewatch	·	4.2 km	MPC · JPL
366361	2000 BR_{21}	—	January 29, 2000	Kitt Peak	Spacewatch	·	3.8 km	MPC · JPL
366362	2000 CU_{34}	—	February 2, 2000	Socorro	LINEAR	THB	4.0 km	MPC · JPL
366363	2000 ER_{51}	—	March 3, 2000	Kitt Peak	Spacewatch	·	920 m	MPC · JPL
366364	2000 EY_{182}	—	March 5, 2000	Socorro	LINEAR	·	1.5 km	MPC · JPL
366365	2000 KK_{65}	—	May 27, 2000	Socorro	LINEAR	·	6.2 km	MPC · JPL
366366	2000 PR_{9}	—	August 9, 2000	Socorro	LINEAR	·	1.6 km	MPC · JPL
366367	2000 QA_{85}	—	August 25, 2000	Socorro	LINEAR	·	1.5 km	MPC · JPL
366368	2000 RF_{20}	—	September 1, 2000	Socorro	LINEAR	·	780 m	MPC · JPL
366369	2000 RH_{57}	—	September 7, 2000	Kitt Peak	Spacewatch	·	840 m	MPC · JPL
366370	2000 RM_{98}	—	September 5, 2000	Anderson Mesa	LONEOS	526	3.1 km	MPC · JPL
366371	2000 SS_{28}	—	September 23, 2000	Socorro	LINEAR	·	2.5 km	MPC · JPL
366372	2000 SP_{90}	—	September 22, 2000	Socorro	LINEAR	JUN	1.5 km	MPC · JPL
366373	2000 SQ_{92}	—	September 23, 2000	Socorro	LINEAR	MAR	1.5 km	MPC · JPL
366374	2000 SO_{171}	—	September 25, 2000	Socorro	LINEAR	·	880 m	MPC · JPL
366375	2000 SU_{190}	—	September 23, 2000	Socorro	LINEAR	·	2.5 km	MPC · JPL
366376	2000 SN_{194}	—	September 24, 2000	Socorro	LINEAR	·	3.0 km	MPC · JPL
366377	2000 SP_{232}	—	September 28, 2000	Socorro	LINEAR	H	770 m	MPC · JPL
366378	2000 SP_{297}	—	September 28, 2000	Socorro	LINEAR	·	920 m	MPC · JPL
366379	2000 SG_{314}	—	September 28, 2000	Socorro	LINEAR	JUN	1.4 km	MPC · JPL
366380	2000 TP_{21}	—	October 1, 2000	Socorro	LINEAR	·	2.1 km	MPC · JPL
366381	2000 TY_{23}	—	October 2, 2000	Socorro	LINEAR	·	2.8 km	MPC · JPL
366382	2000 UE_{72}	—	October 25, 2000	Socorro	LINEAR	EUN	2.0 km	MPC · JPL
366383	2000 WK_{45}	—	November 21, 2000	Socorro	LINEAR	EUN	1.7 km	MPC · JPL
366384	2000 WG_{124}	—	November 19, 2000	Socorro	LINEAR	PHO	2.0 km	MPC · JPL
366385	2000 WB_{177}	—	November 27, 2000	Socorro	LINEAR	MRX	1.1 km	MPC · JPL
366386	2000 YH_{28}	—	December 26, 2000	Haleakala	NEAT	·	2.9 km	MPC · JPL
366387	2001 CT_{20}	—	February 3, 2001	Socorro	LINEAR	T_{j} (2.87)	3.2 km	MPC · JPL
366388	2001 OV_{31}	—	July 23, 2001	Palomar	NEAT	·	1.2 km	MPC · JPL
366389	2001 PK_{3}	—	August 5, 2001	Palomar	NEAT	MAR	1.6 km	MPC · JPL
366390	2001 QG_{33}	—	August 17, 2001	Palomar	NEAT	(5)	1.5 km	MPC · JPL
366391	2001 QW_{47}	—	August 16, 2001	Socorro	LINEAR	MAR	1.3 km	MPC · JPL
366392	2001 QL_{173}	—	August 25, 2001	Socorro	LINEAR	·	1.3 km	MPC · JPL
366393	2001 QU_{182}	—	August 17, 2001	Palomar	NEAT	·	1.0 km	MPC · JPL
366394	2001 QK_{191}	—	August 22, 2001	Haleakala	NEAT	·	1.1 km	MPC · JPL
366395	2001 QR_{191}	—	August 22, 2001	Socorro	LINEAR	·	1.8 km	MPC · JPL
366396	2001 QK_{206}	—	August 23, 2001	Anderson Mesa	LONEOS	·	770 m	MPC · JPL
366397	2001 QZ_{240}	—	August 24, 2001	Socorro	LINEAR	·	920 m	MPC · JPL
366398	2001 RD_{30}	—	September 7, 2001	Socorro	LINEAR	·	1.1 km	MPC · JPL
366399	2001 RJ_{41}	—	September 11, 2001	Socorro	LINEAR	(5)	1.0 km	MPC · JPL
366400	2001 RR_{97}	—	September 12, 2001	Kitt Peak	Spacewatch	(5)	930 m	MPC · JPL

== 366401–366500 ==
back to top

Designation			Discovery			Properties		Ref
Permanent	Provisional	Named after	Date	Site	Discoverer(s)	Category	Diam.	Ref
366401	2001 RH_{140}	—	September 12, 2001	Socorro	LINEAR	·	1.3 km	MPC · JPL
366402	2001 SY_{79}	—	September 20, 2001	Socorro	LINEAR	·	1.6 km	MPC · JPL
366403	2001 SB_{104}	—	September 20, 2001	Socorro	LINEAR	(5)	830 m	MPC · JPL
366404	2001 SY_{145}	—	September 16, 2001	Socorro	LINEAR	·	970 m	MPC · JPL
366405	2001 SX_{146}	—	September 16, 2001	Socorro	LINEAR	(5)	1.2 km	MPC · JPL
366406	2001 SL_{277}	—	September 21, 2001	Anderson Mesa	LONEOS	·	2.1 km	MPC · JPL
366407	2001 SH_{298}	—	September 10, 2001	Anderson Mesa	LONEOS	ADE	2.0 km	MPC · JPL
366408	2001 SZ_{312}	—	September 21, 2001	Socorro	LINEAR	(5)	1.3 km	MPC · JPL
366409	2001 SF_{339}	—	September 21, 2001	Palomar	NEAT	·	1.7 km	MPC · JPL
366410	2001 SP_{342}	—	September 21, 2001	Palomar	NEAT	(5)	1.1 km	MPC · JPL
366411	2001 TL_{1}	—	October 10, 2001	Kitt Peak	Spacewatch	·	1.4 km	MPC · JPL
366412	2001 TA_{6}	—	October 10, 2001	Palomar	NEAT	·	1.0 km	MPC · JPL
366413	2001 TS_{28}	—	October 14, 2001	Socorro	LINEAR	(5)	960 m	MPC · JPL
366414	2001 TP_{93}	—	October 7, 2001	Palomar	NEAT	(5)	1.6 km	MPC · JPL
366415	2001 TS_{110}	—	October 14, 2001	Socorro	LINEAR	·	980 m	MPC · JPL
366416	2001 TV_{209}	—	October 13, 2001	Kitt Peak	Spacewatch	·	1.2 km	MPC · JPL
366417	2001 TJ_{223}	—	October 14, 2001	Socorro	LINEAR	·	630 m	MPC · JPL
366418	2001 TE_{240}	—	October 10, 2001	Palomar	NEAT	(5)	1.4 km	MPC · JPL
366419	2001 TZ_{256}	—	October 15, 2001	Socorro	LINEAR	·	1.1 km	MPC · JPL
366420	2001 UZ_{20}	—	October 17, 2001	Socorro	LINEAR	·	1.4 km	MPC · JPL
366421	2001 UQ_{59}	—	October 17, 2001	Socorro	LINEAR	·	2.3 km	MPC · JPL
366422	2001 UZ_{126}	—	October 17, 2001	Socorro	LINEAR	·	1.4 km	MPC · JPL
366423	2001 UF_{165}	—	October 23, 2001	Palomar	NEAT	(5)	1.2 km	MPC · JPL
366424	2001 UJ_{217}	—	October 24, 2001	Socorro	LINEAR	(5)	1.6 km	MPC · JPL
366425	2001 VG_{20}	—	November 9, 2001	Socorro	LINEAR	·	1.2 km	MPC · JPL
366426	2001 VT_{22}	—	November 9, 2001	Socorro	LINEAR	·	1.4 km	MPC · JPL
366427	2001 VH_{38}	—	November 9, 2001	Socorro	LINEAR	EUN	1.4 km	MPC · JPL
366428	2001 VB_{44}	—	November 9, 2001	Socorro	LINEAR	·	3.6 km	MPC · JPL
366429	2001 VU_{78}	—	November 11, 2001	Socorro	LINEAR	H	470 m	MPC · JPL
366430	2001 VH_{86}	—	November 12, 2001	Socorro	LINEAR	·	1.4 km	MPC · JPL
366431	2001 VB_{99}	—	November 15, 2001	Socorro	LINEAR	·	2.5 km	MPC · JPL
366432	2001 WP_{2}	—	November 17, 2001	Socorro	LINEAR	H	490 m	MPC · JPL
366433	2001 WZ_{25}	—	November 17, 2001	Socorro	LINEAR	(5)	960 m	MPC · JPL
366434	2001 WA_{49}	—	November 18, 2001	Kitt Peak	Spacewatch	·	1.1 km	MPC · JPL
366435	2001 WH_{63}	—	November 19, 2001	Socorro	LINEAR	·	1.5 km	MPC · JPL
366436	2001 WW_{90}	—	November 21, 2001	Socorro	LINEAR	(5)	1.2 km	MPC · JPL
366437	2001 WO_{99}	—	November 18, 2001	Socorro	LINEAR	·	1.4 km	MPC · JPL
366438	2001 XE_{14}	—	December 9, 2001	Socorro	LINEAR	·	2.2 km	MPC · JPL
366439	2001 XV_{22}	—	December 9, 2001	Socorro	LINEAR	·	1.4 km	MPC · JPL
366440	2001 XM_{96}	—	December 10, 2001	Socorro	LINEAR	(194)	2.5 km	MPC · JPL
366441	2001 XD_{124}	—	December 14, 2001	Socorro	LINEAR	EUN	1.7 km	MPC · JPL
366442	2001 XM_{146}	—	December 14, 2001	Socorro	LINEAR	·	1.6 km	MPC · JPL
366443	2001 XE_{198}	—	December 14, 2001	Socorro	LINEAR	·	2.3 km	MPC · JPL
366444	2001 XM_{213}	—	December 11, 2001	Socorro	LINEAR	·	2.0 km	MPC · JPL
366445	2001 XO_{216}	—	December 14, 2001	Socorro	LINEAR	·	2.2 km	MPC · JPL
366446	2001 YQ_{17}	—	December 17, 2001	Socorro	LINEAR	·	2.5 km	MPC · JPL
366447	2001 YU_{51}	—	December 18, 2001	Socorro	LINEAR	·	2.9 km	MPC · JPL
366448	2001 YF_{133}	—	December 21, 2001	Socorro	LINEAR	·	1.4 km	MPC · JPL
366449	2001 YW_{151}	—	December 19, 2001	Palomar	NEAT	·	2.9 km	MPC · JPL
366450	2002 AU_{11}	—	January 9, 2002	Socorro	LINEAR	·	2.4 km	MPC · JPL
366451	2002 AN_{18}	—	January 11, 2002	Socorro	LINEAR	·	1.6 km	MPC · JPL
366452	2002 AX_{65}	—	January 12, 2002	Socorro	LINEAR	·	1.4 km	MPC · JPL
366453	2002 AU_{69}	—	January 8, 2002	Socorro	LINEAR	·	1.7 km	MPC · JPL
366454	2002 AQ_{113}	—	January 9, 2002	Socorro	LINEAR	·	1.8 km	MPC · JPL
366455	2002 AZ_{126}	—	January 13, 2002	Socorro	LINEAR	·	1.6 km	MPC · JPL
366456	2002 AY_{149}	—	January 14, 2002	Socorro	LINEAR	·	2.7 km	MPC · JPL
366457	2002 AU_{173}	—	January 14, 2002	Socorro	LINEAR	·	860 m	MPC · JPL
366458	2002 CO_{1}	—	February 3, 2002	Haleakala	NEAT	H	410 m	MPC · JPL
366459	2002 CO_{11}	—	February 6, 2002	Palomar	NEAT	H	660 m	MPC · JPL
366460	2002 CB_{31}	—	February 6, 2002	Socorro	LINEAR	·	2.5 km	MPC · JPL
366461	2002 CU_{34}	—	February 6, 2002	Socorro	LINEAR	·	840 m	MPC · JPL
366462	2002 CF_{45}	—	February 8, 2002	Kitt Peak	Spacewatch	(5)	1.6 km	MPC · JPL
366463	2002 CH_{68}	—	February 7, 2002	Socorro	LINEAR	·	980 m	MPC · JPL
366464	2002 CT_{262}	—	January 13, 2002	Socorro	LINEAR	HNS	1.4 km	MPC · JPL
366465	2002 EN_{10}	—	March 11, 2002	Palomar	NEAT	H	640 m	MPC · JPL
366466	2002 ET_{10}	—	March 9, 2002	Socorro	LINEAR	H	490 m	MPC · JPL
366467	2002 EX_{38}	—	March 12, 2002	Kitt Peak	Spacewatch	·	780 m	MPC · JPL
366468	2002 EA_{69}	—	March 13, 2002	Socorro	LINEAR	·	860 m	MPC · JPL
366469	2002 EN_{142}	—	March 12, 2002	Palomar	NEAT	·	3.0 km	MPC · JPL
366470	2002 FD	—	March 16, 2002	Socorro	LINEAR	AMO	450 m	MPC · JPL
366471	2002 FG_{15}	—	March 16, 2002	Haleakala	NEAT	·	780 m	MPC · JPL
366472	2002 GU_{67}	—	April 8, 2002	Kitt Peak	Spacewatch	·	1.4 km	MPC · JPL
366473	2002 GL_{75}	—	April 9, 2002	Socorro	LINEAR	·	1.6 km	MPC · JPL
366474	2002 GA_{117}	—	April 11, 2002	Socorro	LINEAR	·	990 m	MPC · JPL
366475	2002 GJ_{120}	—	April 12, 2002	Socorro	LINEAR	·	2.6 km	MPC · JPL
366476	2002 GZ_{185}	—	March 12, 2007	Kitt Peak	Spacewatch	·	1.9 km	MPC · JPL
366477	2002 GA_{186}	—	April 9, 2002	Palomar	NEAT	·	1.6 km	MPC · JPL
366478	2002 GQ_{189}	—	April 5, 2002	Palomar	NEAT	·	860 m	MPC · JPL
366479	2002 JU_{57}	—	May 9, 2002	Socorro	LINEAR	·	990 m	MPC · JPL
366480	2002 JX_{57}	—	May 9, 2002	Socorro	LINEAR	·	970 m	MPC · JPL
366481	2002 JZ_{93}	—	May 11, 2002	Socorro	LINEAR	·	1.6 km	MPC · JPL
366482	2002 JU_{149}	—	May 10, 2002	Palomar	NEAT	·	2.9 km	MPC · JPL
366483	2002 LB_{3}	—	May 17, 2002	Socorro	LINEAR	TIR	3.6 km	MPC · JPL
366484	2002 LP_{64}	—	September 23, 2008	Catalina	CSS	TIR	2.7 km	MPC · JPL
366485	2002 NK_{17}	—	July 13, 2002	Socorro	LINEAR	EUP	6.5 km	MPC · JPL
366486	2002 NC_{39}	—	July 13, 2002	Socorro	LINEAR	·	5.0 km	MPC · JPL
366487 Neilyoung	2002 NM_{57}	Neilyoung	July 4, 2002	Palomar	M. Meyer	·	1.3 km	MPC · JPL
366488	2002 NO_{66}	—	July 9, 2002	Palomar	NEAT	NYS	820 m	MPC · JPL
366489	2002 NX_{70}	—	July 9, 2002	Palomar	NEAT	·	2.9 km	MPC · JPL
366490	2002 NE_{73}	—	July 8, 2002	Palomar	NEAT	THM	2.4 km	MPC · JPL
366491	2002 NU_{73}	—	July 14, 2002	Palomar	NEAT	·	850 m	MPC · JPL
366492	2002 NT_{74}	—	July 14, 2002	Palomar	NEAT	·	1.5 km	MPC · JPL
366493	2002 NA_{78}	—	April 27, 2009	Mount Lemmon	Mount Lemmon Survey	MAS	730 m	MPC · JPL
366494	2002 NL_{79}	—	November 7, 2005	Mauna Kea	A. Boattini	·	3.8 km	MPC · JPL
366495	2002 OH_{2}	—	July 17, 2002	Socorro	LINEAR	·	5.7 km	MPC · JPL
366496	2002 OM_{19}	—	July 21, 2002	Palomar	NEAT	·	1.2 km	MPC · JPL
366497	2002 OD_{28}	—	July 22, 2002	Palomar	NEAT	·	1.2 km	MPC · JPL
366498	2002 OV_{37}	—	February 9, 2005	Mount Lemmon	Mount Lemmon Survey	·	3.5 km	MPC · JPL
366499	2002 PA_{8}	—	August 3, 2002	Palomar	NEAT	·	1.1 km	MPC · JPL
366500	2002 PO_{24}	—	August 6, 2002	Palomar	NEAT	·	850 m	MPC · JPL

== 366501–366600 ==
back to top

Designation			Discovery			Properties		Ref
Permanent	Provisional	Named after	Date	Site	Discoverer(s)	Category	Diam.	Ref
366501	2002 PS_{29}	—	August 6, 2002	Palomar	NEAT	V	690 m	MPC · JPL
366502	2002 PB_{52}	—	August 8, 2002	Palomar	NEAT	·	3.0 km	MPC · JPL
366503	2002 PN_{52}	—	July 15, 2002	Palomar	NEAT	·	3.7 km	MPC · JPL
366504	2002 PT_{64}	—	August 3, 2002	Palomar	NEAT	·	3.8 km	MPC · JPL
366505	2002 PL_{76}	—	August 11, 2002	Palomar	NEAT	·	3.2 km	MPC · JPL
366506	2002 PJ_{87}	—	August 13, 2002	Palomar	NEAT	TIR	3.6 km	MPC · JPL
366507	2002 PZ_{122}	—	August 15, 2002	Palomar	NEAT	·	3.3 km	MPC · JPL
366508	2002 PM_{152}	—	August 8, 2002	Palomar	NEAT	·	2.7 km	MPC · JPL
366509	2002 PC_{157}	—	August 8, 2002	Palomar	NEAT	VER	2.8 km	MPC · JPL
366510	2002 PW_{157}	—	August 8, 2002	Palomar	S. F. Hönig	·	2.6 km	MPC · JPL
366511	2002 PA_{170}	—	August 7, 2002	Palomar	NEAT	·	1.3 km	MPC · JPL
366512	2002 PX_{172}	—	August 11, 2002	Palomar	NEAT	TIR	2.4 km	MPC · JPL
366513	2002 PU_{173}	—	August 11, 2002	Palomar	NEAT	·	2.6 km	MPC · JPL
366514	2002 PG_{178}	—	August 7, 2002	Palomar	NEAT	·	5.5 km	MPC · JPL
366515	2002 PJ_{179}	—	August 15, 2002	Palomar	NEAT	TIR	2.4 km	MPC · JPL
366516	2002 PY_{180}	—	August 15, 2002	Palomar	NEAT	·	3.2 km	MPC · JPL
366517	2002 PL_{184}	—	August 13, 2002	Palomar	NEAT	·	5.5 km	MPC · JPL
366518	2002 PB_{187}	—	August 11, 2002	Palomar	NEAT	·	1.2 km	MPC · JPL
366519	2002 PL_{188}	—	August 8, 2002	Palomar	NEAT	(31811)	2.8 km	MPC · JPL
366520	2002 PY_{188}	—	August 7, 2002	Palomar	NEAT	·	1.2 km	MPC · JPL
366521	2002 PA_{194}	—	September 6, 2008	Mount Lemmon	Mount Lemmon Survey	EOS	2.2 km	MPC · JPL
366522	2002 PX_{199}	—	November 20, 2003	Apache Point	SDSS	·	3.5 km	MPC · JPL
366523	2002 PY_{199}	—	October 19, 2003	Palomar	NEAT	·	3.3 km	MPC · JPL
366524	2002 PL_{200}	—	September 19, 2006	Catalina	CSS	V	680 m	MPC · JPL
366525	2002 PJ_{201}	—	May 6, 2006	Mount Lemmon	Mount Lemmon Survey	·	3.0 km	MPC · JPL
366526	2002 QO_{4}	—	August 16, 2002	Palomar	NEAT	·	1.4 km	MPC · JPL
366527	2002 QV_{8}	—	August 19, 2002	Palomar	NEAT	·	1.1 km	MPC · JPL
366528	2002 QO_{10}	—	August 25, 2002	Palomar	NEAT	T_{j} (2.98)	3.6 km	MPC · JPL
366529	2002 QQ_{11}	—	August 26, 2002	Palomar	NEAT	·	1.3 km	MPC · JPL
366530	2002 QQ_{23}	—	August 28, 2002	Palomar	NEAT	·	1.3 km	MPC · JPL
366531	2002 QA_{48}	—	August 27, 2002	Palomar	S. F. Hönig	·	1.2 km	MPC · JPL
366532	2002 QY_{55}	—	August 29, 2002	Palomar	S. F. Hönig	THM	2.4 km	MPC · JPL
366533	2002 QT_{61}	—	August 18, 2002	Palomar	NEAT	LIX	4.5 km	MPC · JPL
366534	2002 QO_{71}	—	August 28, 2002	Palomar	NEAT	HYG	2.6 km	MPC · JPL
366535	2002 QL_{73}	—	August 19, 2002	Palomar	NEAT	·	1.4 km	MPC · JPL
366536	2002 QV_{77}	—	August 16, 2002	Haleakala	NEAT	NYS	910 m	MPC · JPL
366537	2002 QY_{84}	—	August 16, 2002	Palomar	NEAT	·	2.5 km	MPC · JPL
366538	2002 QC_{89}	—	August 27, 2002	Palomar	NEAT	·	2.5 km	MPC · JPL
366539	2002 QN_{90}	—	August 19, 2002	Palomar	NEAT	·	1.2 km	MPC · JPL
366540	2002 QQ_{91}	—	August 30, 2002	Palomar	NEAT	·	1.2 km	MPC · JPL
366541	2002 QJ_{92}	—	August 16, 2002	Palomar	NEAT	NYS	1.1 km	MPC · JPL
366542	2002 QQ_{93}	—	August 18, 2002	Palomar	NEAT	·	1.2 km	MPC · JPL
366543	2002 QM_{104}	—	August 17, 2002	Palomar	NEAT	NYS	1.3 km	MPC · JPL
366544	2002 QL_{109}	—	August 17, 2002	Palomar	NEAT	·	3.0 km	MPC · JPL
366545	2002 QP_{110}	—	August 17, 2002	Palomar	NEAT	·	2.9 km	MPC · JPL
366546	2002 QE_{114}	—	August 28, 2002	Palomar	NEAT	HYG	2.4 km	MPC · JPL
366547	2002 QR_{132}	—	August 16, 2002	Palomar	NEAT	·	910 m	MPC · JPL
366548	2002 QK_{136}	—	December 12, 2004	Apache Point	SDSS	·	3.2 km	MPC · JPL
366549	2002 QY_{138}	—	August 17, 2002	Palomar	NEAT	MAS	510 m	MPC · JPL
366550	2002 QE_{142}	—	October 10, 2002	Apache Point	SDSS	·	3.1 km	MPC · JPL
366551	2002 QS_{146}	—	December 30, 2007	Kitt Peak	Spacewatch	·	1.3 km	MPC · JPL
366552	2002 QD_{149}	—	May 1, 2009	Mount Lemmon	Mount Lemmon Survey	·	1.3 km	MPC · JPL
366553	2002 QE_{154}	—	January 17, 2005	Kitt Peak	Spacewatch	VER	3.4 km	MPC · JPL
366554	2002 RG_{34}	—	September 4, 2002	Anderson Mesa	LONEOS	MAS	960 m	MPC · JPL
366555	2002 RX_{67}	—	September 3, 2002	Haleakala	NEAT	·	1.5 km	MPC · JPL
366556	2002 RP_{113}	—	September 5, 2002	Socorro	LINEAR	NYS	1.2 km	MPC · JPL
366557	2002 RM_{141}	—	September 10, 2002	Haleakala	NEAT	·	4.0 km	MPC · JPL
366558	2002 RS_{174}	—	September 13, 2002	Palomar	NEAT	THB	3.6 km	MPC · JPL
366559	2002 RU_{180}	—	September 14, 2002	Haleakala	NEAT	·	1.1 km	MPC · JPL
366560	2002 RF_{182}	—	September 11, 2002	Palomar	NEAT	THB	3.3 km	MPC · JPL
366561	2002 RM_{182}	—	September 11, 2002	Palomar	NEAT	·	4.4 km	MPC · JPL
366562	2002 RW_{188}	—	September 13, 2002	Palomar	NEAT	·	2.9 km	MPC · JPL
366563	2002 RR_{213}	—	September 13, 2002	Anderson Mesa	LONEOS	·	3.7 km	MPC · JPL
366564	2002 RE_{249}	—	September 15, 2002	Xinglong	SCAP	·	1.0 km	MPC · JPL
366565	2002 RR_{254}	—	September 14, 2002	Palomar	NEAT	NYS	990 m	MPC · JPL
366566	2002 RH_{259}	—	September 14, 2002	Palomar	NEAT	NYS	960 m	MPC · JPL
366567	2002 RB_{262}	—	September 13, 2002	Palomar	NEAT	·	1.2 km	MPC · JPL
366568	2002 RH_{263}	—	September 13, 2002	Palomar	NEAT	SUL	1.7 km	MPC · JPL
366569	2002 RP_{269}	—	September 4, 2002	Palomar	NEAT	·	2.6 km	MPC · JPL
366570	2002 ST_{13}	—	September 27, 2002	Palomar	NEAT	PHO	4.1 km	MPC · JPL
366571	2002 SG_{40}	—	September 30, 2002	Haleakala	NEAT	·	1.4 km	MPC · JPL
366572	2002 SP_{61}	—	September 16, 2002	Palomar	NEAT	NYS	1.3 km	MPC · JPL
366573	2002 TQ_{25}	—	October 2, 2002	Socorro	LINEAR	·	1.2 km	MPC · JPL
366574	2002 TT_{26}	—	August 24, 1998	Caussols	ODAS	NYS	1.4 km	MPC · JPL
366575	2002 TF_{27}	—	October 2, 2002	Socorro	LINEAR	·	2.7 km	MPC · JPL
366576	2002 TT_{30}	—	October 2, 2002	Socorro	LINEAR	·	1.3 km	MPC · JPL
366577	2002 TH_{66}	—	October 3, 2002	Socorro	LINEAR	PHO	1.7 km	MPC · JPL
366578	2002 TQ_{82}	—	October 2, 2002	Socorro	LINEAR	MAS	700 m	MPC · JPL
366579	2002 TP_{105}	—	October 4, 2002	Socorro	LINEAR	·	1.4 km	MPC · JPL
366580	2002 TP_{122}	—	October 4, 2002	Palomar	NEAT	·	2.8 km	MPC · JPL
366581	2002 TS_{130}	—	October 4, 2002	Socorro	LINEAR	ERI	1.5 km	MPC · JPL
366582	2002 TR_{159}	—	October 5, 2002	Palomar	NEAT	·	1.5 km	MPC · JPL
366583	2002 TG_{181}	—	October 14, 2002	Palomar	NEAT	T_{j} (2.99)	6.9 km	MPC · JPL
366584	2002 TE_{189}	—	October 5, 2002	Socorro	LINEAR	·	2.7 km	MPC · JPL
366585	2002 TF_{193}	—	October 3, 2002	Socorro	LINEAR	ERI	1.9 km	MPC · JPL
366586	2002 TP_{212}	—	October 7, 2002	Haleakala	NEAT	·	4.8 km	MPC · JPL
366587	2002 TX_{217}	—	October 5, 2002	Socorro	LINEAR	·	1.5 km	MPC · JPL
366588	2002 TO_{240}	—	October 6, 2002	Socorro	LINEAR	·	5.5 km	MPC · JPL
366589	2002 TV_{311}	—	October 15, 2002	Palomar	NEAT	·	1.5 km	MPC · JPL
366590	2002 TA_{317}	—	October 5, 2002	Apache Point	SDSS	·	3.1 km	MPC · JPL
366591	2002 TL_{348}	—	October 5, 2002	Apache Point	SDSS	PHO	940 m	MPC · JPL
366592	2002 UX_{5}	—	October 28, 2002	Palomar	NEAT	·	1.4 km	MPC · JPL
366593	2002 UF_{21}	—	October 30, 2002	Kitt Peak	Spacewatch	·	3.4 km	MPC · JPL
366594	2002 UW_{27}	—	October 31, 2002	Palomar	NEAT	NYS	1.1 km	MPC · JPL
366595	2002 UZ_{46}	—	October 31, 2002	Socorro	LINEAR	·	1.1 km	MPC · JPL
366596	2002 VL_{73}	—	November 7, 2002	Socorro	LINEAR	·	1.5 km	MPC · JPL
366597	2002 VU_{107}	—	November 12, 2002	Socorro	LINEAR	·	1.1 km	MPC · JPL
366598	2002 VY_{124}	—	November 12, 2002	Socorro	LINEAR	·	1.6 km	MPC · JPL
366599	2002 XL_{8}	—	December 2, 2002	Socorro	LINEAR	·	1.5 km	MPC · JPL
366600	2002 XR_{62}	—	December 11, 2002	Socorro	LINEAR	·	1.7 km	MPC · JPL

== 366601–366700 ==
back to top

Designation			Discovery			Properties		Ref
Permanent	Provisional	Named after	Date	Site	Discoverer(s)	Category	Diam.	Ref
366601	2003 AA_{16}	—	January 4, 2003	Socorro	LINEAR	·	1.4 km	MPC · JPL
366602	2003 AY_{53}	—	January 5, 2003	Socorro	LINEAR	(5)	1.8 km	MPC · JPL
366603	2003 BT_{9}	—	January 26, 2003	Palomar	NEAT	·	2.2 km	MPC · JPL
366604	2003 BZ_{17}	—	January 27, 2003	Socorro	LINEAR	·	2.2 km	MPC · JPL
366605	2003 BR_{64}	—	January 30, 2003	Palomar	NEAT	·	1.9 km	MPC · JPL
366606	2003 CK_{14}	—	January 28, 2003	Palomar	NEAT	HNS	1.4 km	MPC · JPL
366607	2003 CO_{16}	—	February 6, 2003	Kitt Peak	Spacewatch	·	1.2 km	MPC · JPL
366608	2003 CA_{17}	—	February 7, 2003	Desert Eagle	W. K. Y. Yeung	·	2.4 km	MPC · JPL
366609	2003 DP_{3}	—	February 22, 2003	Palomar	NEAT	DOR	2.7 km	MPC · JPL
366610	2003 EY_{14}	—	February 2, 2003	Anderson Mesa	LONEOS	·	2.6 km	MPC · JPL
366611	2003 FT_{28}	—	March 24, 2003	Haleakala	NEAT	·	2.2 km	MPC · JPL
366612	2003 FC_{67}	—	March 26, 2003	Palomar	NEAT	EUN	1.5 km	MPC · JPL
366613	2003 FL_{72}	—	March 26, 2003	Palomar	NEAT	(32418)	2.4 km	MPC · JPL
366614	2003 FJ_{132}	—	March 8, 2003	Anderson Mesa	LONEOS	·	1.9 km	MPC · JPL
366615	2003 LO_{6}	—	June 10, 2003	Socorro	LINEAR	T_{j} (2.79) · AMO +1km	1.5 km	MPC · JPL
366616	2003 NP_{4}	—	July 5, 2003	Socorro	LINEAR	·	1.4 km	MPC · JPL
366617	2003 OS_{6}	—	July 24, 2003	Palomar	NEAT	·	810 m	MPC · JPL
366618	2003 OP_{11}	—	July 20, 2003	Palomar	NEAT	H	590 m	MPC · JPL
366619	2003 OB_{26}	—	July 3, 2003	Kitt Peak	Spacewatch	EOS	2.8 km	MPC · JPL
366620	2003 QR_{38}	—	August 22, 2003	Socorro	LINEAR	·	770 m	MPC · JPL
366621	2003 QP_{44}	—	August 23, 2003	Palomar	NEAT	·	730 m	MPC · JPL
366622	2003 QA_{54}	—	August 23, 2003	Socorro	LINEAR	·	810 m	MPC · JPL
366623	2003 QQ_{58}	—	August 26, 2003	Socorro	LINEAR	·	770 m	MPC · JPL
366624	2003 QT_{72}	—	August 23, 2003	Palomar	NEAT	·	5.7 km	MPC · JPL
366625	2003 RX_{12}	—	September 14, 2003	Haleakala	NEAT	·	670 m	MPC · JPL
366626	2003 RV_{18}	—	September 15, 2003	Anderson Mesa	LONEOS	·	2.5 km	MPC · JPL
366627	2003 SH_{10}	—	September 17, 2003	Kitt Peak	Spacewatch	·	2.4 km	MPC · JPL
366628	2003 SY_{37}	—	September 16, 2003	Palomar	NEAT	·	5.3 km	MPC · JPL
366629	2003 SA_{44}	—	September 7, 2003	Kvistaberg	Uppsala-DLR Asteroid Survey	·	3.6 km	MPC · JPL
366630	2003 SO_{74}	—	September 18, 2003	Kitt Peak	Spacewatch	·	2.6 km	MPC · JPL
366631	2003 SZ_{82}	—	September 18, 2003	Kitt Peak	Spacewatch	·	3.6 km	MPC · JPL
366632	2003 SL_{90}	—	September 18, 2003	Socorro	LINEAR	·	790 m	MPC · JPL
366633	2003 SX_{99}	—	September 20, 2003	Kitt Peak	Spacewatch	·	1.8 km	MPC · JPL
366634	2003 SU_{112}	—	September 16, 2003	Kitt Peak	Spacewatch	·	2.7 km	MPC · JPL
366635	2003 SG_{122}	—	September 17, 2003	Črni Vrh	Skvarč, J.	·	950 m	MPC · JPL
366636	2003 SA_{124}	—	September 18, 2003	Goodricke-Pigott	R. A. Tucker	·	2.8 km	MPC · JPL
366637	2003 SX_{140}	—	September 19, 2003	Palomar	NEAT	·	830 m	MPC · JPL
366638	2003 SK_{143}	—	September 20, 2003	Palomar	NEAT	CYB	3.7 km	MPC · JPL
366639	2003 SZ_{158}	—	September 2, 2003	Socorro	LINEAR	·	2.2 km	MPC · JPL
366640	2003 SR_{202}	—	September 22, 2003	Anderson Mesa	LONEOS	·	460 m	MPC · JPL
366641	2003 SS_{208}	—	September 18, 2003	Palomar	NEAT	·	880 m	MPC · JPL
366642	2003 SR_{225}	—	September 26, 2003	Socorro	LINEAR	·	990 m	MPC · JPL
366643	2003 SU_{250}	—	September 26, 2003	Socorro	LINEAR	·	6.4 km	MPC · JPL
366644	2003 SV_{263}	—	September 19, 2003	Socorro	LINEAR	·	770 m	MPC · JPL
366645	2003 SQ_{272}	—	September 27, 2003	Socorro	LINEAR	·	2.8 km	MPC · JPL
366646	2003 SN_{275}	—	September 29, 2003	Socorro	LINEAR	·	2.6 km	MPC · JPL
366647	2003 SF_{277}	—	September 30, 2003	Socorro	LINEAR	EOS	2.3 km	MPC · JPL
366648	2003 SM_{277}	—	September 30, 2003	Socorro	LINEAR	·	2.1 km	MPC · JPL
366649	2003 SS_{282}	—	September 19, 2003	Palomar	NEAT	EOS	2.8 km	MPC · JPL
366650	2003 SZ_{285}	—	September 20, 2003	Palomar	NEAT	·	640 m	MPC · JPL
366651	2003 SZ_{297}	—	September 18, 2003	Haleakala	NEAT	·	1.1 km	MPC · JPL
366652	2003 SU_{318}	—	September 18, 2003	Haleakala	NEAT	·	1.8 km	MPC · JPL
366653	2003 SR_{321}	—	September 22, 2003	Anderson Mesa	LONEOS	·	1.7 km	MPC · JPL
366654	2003 SP_{325}	—	September 17, 2003	Kitt Peak	Spacewatch	·	1.3 km	MPC · JPL
366655	2003 SS_{329}	—	September 22, 2003	Kitt Peak	Spacewatch	·	540 m	MPC · JPL
366656	2003 SN_{332}	—	September 28, 2003	Anderson Mesa	LONEOS	·	3.0 km	MPC · JPL
366657	2003 SK_{334}	—	September 28, 2003	Kitt Peak	Spacewatch	·	940 m	MPC · JPL
366658	2003 SV_{335}	—	September 26, 2003	Apache Point	SDSS	V	740 m	MPC · JPL
366659	2003 SC_{336}	—	September 26, 2003	Apache Point	SDSS	·	3.0 km	MPC · JPL
366660	2003 SB_{339}	—	September 26, 2003	Apache Point	SDSS	·	2.3 km	MPC · JPL
366661	2003 SH_{342}	—	September 17, 2003	Kitt Peak	Spacewatch	·	1.6 km	MPC · JPL
366662	2003 SN_{345}	—	September 18, 2003	Socorro	LINEAR	·	890 m	MPC · JPL
366663	2003 SS_{393}	—	October 23, 2003	Kitt Peak	Spacewatch	EOS	2.0 km	MPC · JPL
366664	2003 SP_{430}	—	September 21, 2003	Kitt Peak	Spacewatch	V	590 m	MPC · JPL
366665	2003 SS_{432}	—	September 20, 2003	Kitt Peak	Spacewatch	·	2.3 km	MPC · JPL
366666	2003 TB_{3}	—	October 1, 2003	Kitt Peak	Spacewatch	·	4.5 km	MPC · JPL
366667	2003 TR_{26}	—	September 20, 2003	Kitt Peak	Spacewatch	·	3.0 km	MPC · JPL
366668	2003 US	—	October 16, 2003	Socorro	LINEAR	H	680 m	MPC · JPL
366669	2003 UM_{1}	—	October 16, 2003	Palomar	NEAT	·	4.0 km	MPC · JPL
366670	2003 US_{4}	—	October 16, 2003	Socorro	LINEAR	EUP	6.0 km	MPC · JPL
366671	2003 UR_{15}	—	October 16, 2003	Anderson Mesa	LONEOS	H	580 m	MPC · JPL
366672	2003 UW_{16}	—	October 16, 2003	Campo Imperatore	CINEOS	·	2.6 km	MPC · JPL
366673	2003 UT_{36}	—	October 16, 2003	Palomar	NEAT	·	3.6 km	MPC · JPL
366674	2003 UP_{39}	—	October 16, 2003	Kitt Peak	Spacewatch	·	2.1 km	MPC · JPL
366675	2003 UY_{57}	—	September 21, 2003	Kitt Peak	Spacewatch	·	700 m	MPC · JPL
366676	2003 UL_{83}	—	October 17, 2003	Anderson Mesa	LONEOS	·	4.0 km	MPC · JPL
366677	2003 UD_{86}	—	October 18, 2003	Palomar	NEAT	·	2.7 km	MPC · JPL
366678	2003 UM_{118}	—	October 17, 2003	Kitt Peak	Spacewatch	·	740 m	MPC · JPL
366679	2003 UB_{134}	—	October 20, 2003	Palomar	NEAT	·	4.7 km	MPC · JPL
366680	2003 UQ_{134}	—	October 20, 2003	Palomar	NEAT	·	1.7 km	MPC · JPL
366681	2003 UV_{149}	—	October 20, 2003	Socorro	LINEAR	·	720 m	MPC · JPL
366682	2003 UA_{180}	—	October 21, 2003	Socorro	LINEAR	·	760 m	MPC · JPL
366683	2003 UN_{240}	—	October 24, 2003	Kitt Peak	Spacewatch	HYG	3.3 km	MPC · JPL
366684	2003 UB_{265}	—	October 18, 2003	Anderson Mesa	LONEOS	·	740 m	MPC · JPL
366685	2003 UT_{267}	—	October 28, 2003	Socorro	LINEAR	·	1.0 km	MPC · JPL
366686	2003 US_{275}	—	October 29, 2003	Socorro	LINEAR	·	720 m	MPC · JPL
366687	2003 UW_{276}	—	October 30, 2003	Socorro	LINEAR	·	1.2 km	MPC · JPL
366688	2003 UJ_{291}	—	October 23, 2003	Kitt Peak	Spacewatch	·	2.7 km	MPC · JPL
366689 Rohrbaugh	2003 UM_{300}	Rohrbaugh	September 27, 2003	Kitt Peak	Spacewatch	·	780 m	MPC · JPL
366690	2003 UQ_{340}	—	October 18, 2003	Kitt Peak	Spacewatch	·	1.4 km	MPC · JPL
366691	2003 UG_{354}	—	October 19, 2003	Apache Point	SDSS	·	930 m	MPC · JPL
366692	2003 UX_{363}	—	October 20, 2003	Kitt Peak	Spacewatch	·	2.3 km	MPC · JPL
366693	2003 UO_{366}	—	October 20, 2003	Kitt Peak	Spacewatch	·	1.2 km	MPC · JPL
366694	2003 UM_{398}	—	October 22, 2003	Apache Point	SDSS	·	3.2 km	MPC · JPL
366695	2003 UB_{404}	—	October 23, 2003	Apache Point	SDSS	H	550 m	MPC · JPL
366696	2003 UR_{408}	—	October 23, 2003	Apache Point	SDSS	·	790 m	MPC · JPL
366697	2003 WG_{31}	—	November 18, 2003	Palomar	NEAT	·	4.0 km	MPC · JPL
366698	2003 WC_{57}	—	November 18, 2003	Palomar	NEAT	·	2.8 km	MPC · JPL
366699	2003 WR_{64}	—	November 19, 2003	Kitt Peak	Spacewatch	·	2.9 km	MPC · JPL
366700	2003 WD_{66}	—	November 19, 2003	Socorro	LINEAR	·	2.7 km	MPC · JPL

== 366701–366800 ==
back to top

Designation			Discovery			Properties		Ref
Permanent	Provisional	Named after	Date	Site	Discoverer(s)	Category	Diam.	Ref
366701	2003 WC_{67}	—	November 19, 2003	Kitt Peak	Spacewatch	NYS	1.2 km	MPC · JPL
366702	2003 WX_{83}	—	November 21, 2003	Kitt Peak	Spacewatch	·	3.0 km	MPC · JPL
366703	2003 WP_{85}	—	November 20, 2003	Socorro	LINEAR	·	1.1 km	MPC · JPL
366704	2003 WH_{88}	—	November 24, 2003	Socorro	LINEAR	H	650 m	MPC · JPL
366705	2003 WQ_{88}	—	October 25, 2003	Socorro	LINEAR	·	1.4 km	MPC · JPL
366706	2003 WN_{123}	—	November 20, 2003	Socorro	LINEAR	·	810 m	MPC · JPL
366707	2003 WA_{130}	—	November 21, 2003	Socorro	LINEAR	THM	4.8 km	MPC · JPL
366708	2003 WL_{135}	—	November 21, 2003	Socorro	LINEAR	·	840 m	MPC · JPL
366709	2003 WV_{136}	—	November 21, 2003	Socorro	LINEAR	·	2.6 km	MPC · JPL
366710	2003 WP_{144}	—	November 21, 2003	Socorro	LINEAR	·	2.0 km	MPC · JPL
366711	2003 WJ_{154}	—	November 26, 2003	Kitt Peak	Spacewatch	·	1.3 km	MPC · JPL
366712	2003 WM_{155}	—	November 26, 2003	Kitt Peak	Spacewatch	·	3.7 km	MPC · JPL
366713	2003 WP_{172}	—	November 30, 2003	Kitt Peak	Spacewatch	·	990 m	MPC · JPL
366714	2003 XU_{10}	—	December 5, 2003	Catalina	CSS	·	3.5 km	MPC · JPL
366715	2003 XZ_{23}	—	December 1, 2003	Kitt Peak	Spacewatch	NYS	1.4 km	MPC · JPL
366716	2003 XZ_{30}	—	November 19, 2003	Kitt Peak	Spacewatch	·	690 m	MPC · JPL
366717	2003 XL_{34}	—	December 1, 2003	Kitt Peak	Spacewatch	·	3.6 km	MPC · JPL
366718	2003 XP_{37}	—	November 23, 2003	Kitt Peak	Spacewatch	·	3.9 km	MPC · JPL
366719	2003 YQ_{11}	—	December 17, 2003	Socorro	LINEAR	T_{j} (2.99) · EUP	5.0 km	MPC · JPL
366720	2003 YL_{27}	—	December 17, 2003	Črni Vrh	Mikuž, H.	·	1.7 km	MPC · JPL
366721	2003 YD_{47}	—	December 17, 2003	Kitt Peak	Spacewatch	VER	3.6 km	MPC · JPL
366722	2003 YL_{87}	—	December 19, 2003	Socorro	LINEAR	·	4.3 km	MPC · JPL
366723	2003 YF_{109}	—	December 22, 2003	Socorro	LINEAR	·	5.4 km	MPC · JPL
366724	2003 YH_{127}	—	December 27, 2003	Socorro	LINEAR	H	650 m	MPC · JPL
366725	2003 YM_{133}	—	December 28, 2003	Socorro	LINEAR	·	1.4 km	MPC · JPL
366726	2003 YL_{180}	—	December 21, 2003	Apache Point	SDSS	H	650 m	MPC · JPL
366727	2004 BS_{26}	—	January 16, 2004	Palomar	NEAT	H	730 m	MPC · JPL
366728	2004 BC_{66}	—	January 22, 2004	Socorro	LINEAR	·	1.1 km	MPC · JPL
366729	2004 BD_{76}	—	January 24, 2004	Socorro	LINEAR	H	730 m	MPC · JPL
366730	2004 BG_{103}	—	January 31, 2004	Socorro	LINEAR	·	2.1 km	MPC · JPL
366731	2004 BA_{108}	—	January 28, 2004	Catalina	CSS	·	1.3 km	MPC · JPL
366732	2004 BY_{109}	—	January 28, 2004	Socorro	LINEAR	H	670 m	MPC · JPL
366733	2004 BG_{121}	—	January 30, 2004	Kitt Peak	Spacewatch	AMO	550 m	MPC · JPL
366734	2004 CQ_{24}	—	February 12, 2004	Palomar	NEAT	·	1.1 km	MPC · JPL
366735	2004 EW_{12}	—	March 11, 2004	Palomar	NEAT	·	1.5 km	MPC · JPL
366736	2004 EH_{37}	—	March 13, 2004	Palomar	NEAT	·	2.3 km	MPC · JPL
366737	2004 FE_{32}	—	March 30, 2004	Socorro	LINEAR	BAR	1.6 km	MPC · JPL
366738	2004 FQ_{82}	—	March 17, 2004	Kitt Peak	Spacewatch	(5)	1.4 km	MPC · JPL
366739	2004 FN_{116}	—	March 15, 2004	Socorro	LINEAR	·	2.1 km	MPC · JPL
366740	2004 GM_{1}	—	April 10, 2004	Palomar	NEAT	JUN	1.4 km	MPC · JPL
366741	2004 GJ_{21}	—	April 11, 2004	Palomar	NEAT	·	1.6 km	MPC · JPL
366742	2004 HA_{27}	—	April 20, 2004	Kitt Peak	Spacewatch	·	2.0 km	MPC · JPL
366743	2004 JE_{4}	—	May 9, 2004	Kitt Peak	Spacewatch	·	2.0 km	MPC · JPL
366744	2004 KK_{13}	—	May 10, 2004	Palomar	NEAT	·	1.8 km	MPC · JPL
366745	2004 KT_{13}	—	May 21, 2004	Kitt Peak	Spacewatch	·	1.6 km	MPC · JPL
366746	2004 LJ	—	June 9, 2004	Socorro	LINEAR	APO · PHA	330 m	MPC · JPL
366747	2004 NM_{12}	—	July 11, 2004	Socorro	LINEAR	·	2.8 km	MPC · JPL
366748	2004 PO	—	August 5, 2004	Palomar	NEAT	·	1.9 km	MPC · JPL
366749	2004 PR	—	August 6, 2004	Palomar	NEAT	·	3.0 km	MPC · JPL
366750	2004 PX_{6}	—	August 6, 2004	Palomar	NEAT	DOR	2.8 km	MPC · JPL
366751	2004 PF_{33}	—	August 8, 2004	Socorro	LINEAR	·	2.7 km	MPC · JPL
366752	2004 PA_{47}	—	August 8, 2004	Palomar	NEAT	AEO	1.2 km	MPC · JPL
366753	2004 PR_{70}	—	August 8, 2004	Palomar	NEAT	GEF	1.4 km	MPC · JPL
366754	2004 PW_{84}	—	July 30, 2004	Anderson Mesa	LONEOS	(32418)	2.8 km	MPC · JPL
366755	2004 RO_{7}	—	September 6, 2004	Palomar	NEAT	·	2.5 km	MPC · JPL
366756	2004 RG_{31}	—	September 7, 2004	Socorro	LINEAR	·	1.7 km	MPC · JPL
366757	2004 RD_{39}	—	September 7, 2004	Kitt Peak	Spacewatch	·	1.7 km	MPC · JPL
366758	2004 RU_{80}	—	September 8, 2004	Socorro	LINEAR	·	2.1 km	MPC · JPL
366759	2004 RF_{88}	—	September 7, 2004	Kitt Peak	Spacewatch	AGN	1.2 km	MPC · JPL
366760	2004 RO_{98}	—	September 8, 2004	Socorro	LINEAR	(13314)	2.2 km	MPC · JPL
366761	2004 RZ_{117}	—	September 7, 2004	Kitt Peak	Spacewatch	KOR	1.3 km	MPC · JPL
366762	2004 RE_{122}	—	September 7, 2004	Kitt Peak	Spacewatch	·	2.0 km	MPC · JPL
366763	2004 RR_{140}	—	September 8, 2004	Socorro	LINEAR	·	2.2 km	MPC · JPL
366764	2004 RX_{142}	—	September 8, 2004	Palomar	NEAT	·	2.7 km	MPC · JPL
366765	2004 RP_{161}	—	September 11, 2004	Socorro	LINEAR	·	2.5 km	MPC · JPL
366766	2004 RR_{165}	—	September 7, 2004	Socorro	LINEAR	·	3.0 km	MPC · JPL
366767	2004 RZ_{203}	—	September 12, 2004	Kitt Peak	Spacewatch	·	920 m	MPC · JPL
366768	2004 RR_{211}	—	September 11, 2004	Socorro	LINEAR	·	2.5 km	MPC · JPL
366769	2004 RY_{213}	—	September 11, 2004	Socorro	LINEAR	BRA	2.2 km	MPC · JPL
366770	2004 RF_{217}	—	September 11, 2004	Socorro	LINEAR	·	3.4 km	MPC · JPL
366771	2004 RK_{308}	—	September 13, 2004	Socorro	LINEAR	·	2.6 km	MPC · JPL
366772	2004 RE_{312}	—	September 15, 2004	Kitt Peak	Spacewatch	·	910 m	MPC · JPL
366773	2004 RP_{346}	—	September 10, 2004	Socorro	LINEAR	·	4.5 km	MPC · JPL
366774	2004 TB_{18}	—	October 8, 2004	Palomar	NEAT	APO +1km · PHA	860 m	MPC · JPL
366775	2004 TP_{91}	—	October 5, 2004	Kitt Peak	Spacewatch	·	2.0 km	MPC · JPL
366776	2004 TH_{136}	—	October 8, 2004	Anderson Mesa	LONEOS	·	2.9 km	MPC · JPL
366777	2004 TX_{148}	—	October 6, 2004	Kitt Peak	Spacewatch	·	2.5 km	MPC · JPL
366778	2004 TM_{155}	—	October 6, 2004	Kitt Peak	Spacewatch	KOR	1.3 km	MPC · JPL
366779	2004 TH_{158}	—	October 6, 2004	Kitt Peak	Spacewatch	·	630 m	MPC · JPL
366780	2004 TT_{160}	—	October 6, 2004	Kitt Peak	Spacewatch	·	860 m	MPC · JPL
366781	2004 TL_{167}	—	October 7, 2004	Kitt Peak	Spacewatch	KOR	1.3 km	MPC · JPL
366782	2004 TW_{167}	—	October 7, 2004	Kitt Peak	Spacewatch	·	2.6 km	MPC · JPL
366783	2004 TL_{224}	—	October 8, 2004	Kitt Peak	Spacewatch	·	720 m	MPC · JPL
366784	2004 TO_{242}	—	October 6, 2004	Socorro	LINEAR	·	2.1 km	MPC · JPL
366785	2004 TN_{293}	—	October 10, 2004	Kitt Peak	Spacewatch	·	4.4 km	MPC · JPL
366786	2004 TD_{305}	—	October 10, 2004	Kitt Peak	Spacewatch	·	1.9 km	MPC · JPL
366787	2004 TO_{323}	—	October 11, 2004	Kitt Peak	Spacewatch	KOR	1.5 km	MPC · JPL
366788	2004 UK_{7}	—	October 21, 2004	Socorro	LINEAR	·	3.0 km	MPC · JPL
366789	2004 VW_{1}	—	November 2, 2004	Anderson Mesa	LONEOS	·	2.7 km	MPC · JPL
366790	2004 VB_{40}	—	November 4, 2004	Kitt Peak	Spacewatch	·	900 m	MPC · JPL
366791	2004 VQ_{46}	—	October 15, 2004	Mount Lemmon	Mount Lemmon Survey	·	4.3 km	MPC · JPL
366792	2004 VK_{54}	—	November 4, 2004	Socorro	LINEAR	·	4.9 km	MPC · JPL
366793	2004 VA_{57}	—	November 4, 2004	Catalina	CSS	·	4.4 km	MPC · JPL
366794	2004 VS_{59}	—	November 9, 2004	Catalina	CSS	·	2.9 km	MPC · JPL
366795	2004 VA_{61}	—	November 10, 2004	Kitt Peak	Spacewatch	·	910 m	MPC · JPL
366796	2004 VA_{72}	—	November 11, 2004	Kitt Peak	Spacewatch	·	2.9 km	MPC · JPL
366797	2004 VQ_{101}	—	October 10, 2004	Kitt Peak	Spacewatch	·	3.0 km	MPC · JPL
366798	2004 WQ_{2}	—	November 19, 2004	Catalina	CSS	·	720 m	MPC · JPL
366799	2004 XX_{80}	—	December 10, 2004	Socorro	LINEAR	·	2.6 km	MPC · JPL
366800	2004 XH_{107}	—	December 11, 2004	Catalina	CSS	·	1.5 km	MPC · JPL

== 366801–366900 ==
back to top

Designation			Discovery			Properties		Ref
Permanent	Provisional	Named after	Date	Site	Discoverer(s)	Category	Diam.	Ref
366801	2005 AF_{9}	—	January 7, 2005	Socorro	LINEAR	·	3.3 km	MPC · JPL
366802	2005 AA_{20}	—	January 6, 2005	Socorro	LINEAR	·	5.2 km	MPC · JPL
366803	2005 AP_{49}	—	January 13, 2005	Socorro	LINEAR	·	3.8 km	MPC · JPL
366804	2005 AS_{74}	—	January 15, 2005	Kitt Peak	Spacewatch	VER	4.4 km	MPC · JPL
366805	2005 AN_{82}	—	January 13, 2005	Kitt Peak	Spacewatch	·	900 m	MPC · JPL
366806	2005 BG_{20}	—	January 16, 2005	Kitt Peak	Spacewatch	MAS	810 m	MPC · JPL
366807	2005 CD_{9}	—	February 1, 2005	Catalina	CSS	·	1.1 km	MPC · JPL
366808	2005 CX_{16}	—	February 2, 2005	Socorro	LINEAR	·	1.3 km	MPC · JPL
366809	2005 CE_{17}	—	February 2, 2005	Socorro	LINEAR	·	3.0 km	MPC · JPL
366810	2005 CO_{39}	—	February 3, 2005	Socorro	LINEAR	·	5.9 km	MPC · JPL
366811	2005 ED_{25}	—	March 3, 2005	Catalina	CSS	·	1.4 km	MPC · JPL
366812	2005 EP_{39}	—	March 1, 2005	Kitt Peak	Spacewatch	·	3.8 km	MPC · JPL
366813	2005 EW_{50}	—	March 3, 2005	Catalina	CSS	·	1.4 km	MPC · JPL
366814	2005 EV_{60}	—	March 4, 2005	Catalina	CSS	·	1.4 km	MPC · JPL
366815	2005 EP_{73}	—	March 3, 2005	Kitt Peak	Spacewatch	·	3.4 km	MPC · JPL
366816	2005 ET_{137}	—	March 9, 2005	Socorro	LINEAR	·	1.7 km	MPC · JPL
366817	2005 EP_{245}	—	March 12, 2005	Kitt Peak	Spacewatch	·	1.0 km	MPC · JPL
366818	2005 EO_{247}	—	March 12, 2005	Kitt Peak	Spacewatch	·	1.4 km	MPC · JPL
366819	2005 ET_{270}	—	March 13, 2005	Mayhill	Hutsebaut, R.	·	1.1 km	MPC · JPL
366820	2005 GY_{51}	—	April 2, 2005	Mount Lemmon	Mount Lemmon Survey	·	5.1 km	MPC · JPL
366821	2005 GG_{59}	—	April 4, 2005	Catalina	CSS	H	1.4 km	MPC · JPL
366822	2005 GT_{71}	—	November 24, 2003	Kitt Peak	Spacewatch	·	1.2 km	MPC · JPL
366823	2005 GJ_{72}	—	April 4, 2005	Mount Lemmon	Mount Lemmon Survey	MAS	760 m	MPC · JPL
366824	2005 GY_{94}	—	April 6, 2005	Kitt Peak	Spacewatch	·	1.3 km	MPC · JPL
366825	2005 GF_{215}	—	April 2, 2005	Kitt Peak	Spacewatch	·	1.8 km	MPC · JPL
366826	2005 GK_{215}	—	April 11, 2005	Goodricke-Pigott	R. A. Tucker	·	4.1 km	MPC · JPL
366827	2005 JQ_{65}	—	April 15, 2005	Catalina	CSS	·	1.6 km	MPC · JPL
366828	2005 JZ_{67}	—	May 4, 2005	Haleakala	NEAT	·	1.6 km	MPC · JPL
366829	2005 JZ_{129}	—	May 13, 2005	Kitt Peak	Spacewatch	NYS	1.4 km	MPC · JPL
366830	2005 JT_{167}	—	May 12, 2005	Campo Imperatore	CINEOS	·	1.6 km	MPC · JPL
366831	2005 LU_{6}	—	May 19, 2005	Mount Lemmon	Mount Lemmon Survey	MAS	910 m	MPC · JPL
366832	2005 LH_{20}	—	June 4, 2005	Kitt Peak	Spacewatch	·	1.2 km	MPC · JPL
366833	2005 MC	—	June 16, 2005	Catalina	CSS	AMO +1km	1.6 km	MPC · JPL
366834	2005 MA_{50}	—	June 30, 2005	Kitt Peak	Spacewatch	·	1.1 km	MPC · JPL
366835	2005 NV_{55}	—	July 11, 2005	Mayhill	Lowe, A.	H	770 m	MPC · JPL
366836	2005 NP_{67}	—	July 3, 2005	Catalina	CSS	H	930 m	MPC · JPL
366837	2005 OO_{3}	—	July 27, 2005	Reedy Creek	J. Broughton	·	1.2 km	MPC · JPL
366838	2005 OX_{25}	—	July 31, 2005	Palomar	NEAT	·	730 m	MPC · JPL
366839	2005 PF	—	August 1, 2005	Siding Spring	SSS	·	1.2 km	MPC · JPL
366840	2005 QW_{17}	—	August 25, 2005	Palomar	NEAT	·	1.2 km	MPC · JPL
366841	2005 QN_{71}	—	August 29, 2005	Socorro	LINEAR	·	1.9 km	MPC · JPL
366842	2005 QH_{75}	—	August 28, 2005	St. Véran	St. Veran	(5)	1.3 km	MPC · JPL
366843	2005 QO_{90}	—	August 25, 2005	Palomar	NEAT	·	1.1 km	MPC · JPL
366844	2005 QW_{134}	—	August 28, 2005	Kitt Peak	Spacewatch	·	1.2 km	MPC · JPL
366845	2005 QT_{138}	—	August 28, 2005	Kitt Peak	Spacewatch	·	3.7 km	MPC · JPL
366846	2005 QU_{150}	—	August 30, 2005	Kitt Peak	Spacewatch	·	2.3 km	MPC · JPL
366847	2005 QQ_{160}	—	August 28, 2005	Kitt Peak	Spacewatch	·	1.2 km	MPC · JPL
366848	2005 QZ_{178}	—	August 31, 2005	Palomar	NEAT	(5)	1.2 km	MPC · JPL
366849	2005 QZ_{181}	—	August 31, 2005	Kitt Peak	Spacewatch	·	1.5 km	MPC · JPL
366850	2005 QH_{188}	—	August 31, 2005	Kitt Peak	Spacewatch	·	1.4 km	MPC · JPL
366851	2005 RG_{2}	—	September 2, 2005	Palomar	NEAT	·	1.7 km	MPC · JPL
366852 Ti	2005 RL_{9}	Ti	September 8, 2005	La Cañada	Lacruz, J.	·	1.4 km	MPC · JPL
366853	2005 RY_{44}	—	September 3, 2005	Palomar	NEAT	·	1.5 km	MPC · JPL
366854	2005 SQ_{13}	—	September 24, 2005	Kitt Peak	Spacewatch	(5)	1.4 km	MPC · JPL
366855	2005 SQ_{15}	—	September 26, 2005	Kitt Peak	Spacewatch	·	1.1 km	MPC · JPL
366856	2005 ST_{15}	—	September 26, 2005	Kitt Peak	Spacewatch	(5)	1.1 km	MPC · JPL
366857	2005 SK_{31}	—	September 23, 2005	Kitt Peak	Spacewatch	·	1.7 km	MPC · JPL
366858	2005 SO_{42}	—	September 24, 2005	Kitt Peak	Spacewatch	·	800 m	MPC · JPL
366859	2005 SY_{43}	—	September 24, 2005	Kitt Peak	Spacewatch	·	1.6 km	MPC · JPL
366860	2005 SG_{57}	—	September 26, 2005	Kitt Peak	Spacewatch	·	1.2 km	MPC · JPL
366861	2005 SE_{76}	—	September 24, 2005	Kitt Peak	Spacewatch	·	1.4 km	MPC · JPL
366862	2005 SO_{79}	—	September 24, 2005	Kitt Peak	Spacewatch	·	1.6 km	MPC · JPL
366863	2005 SJ_{89}	—	September 24, 2005	Kitt Peak	Spacewatch	·	1.8 km	MPC · JPL
366864	2005 SK_{90}	—	September 24, 2005	Kitt Peak	Spacewatch	·	1.9 km	MPC · JPL
366865	2005 SB_{113}	—	September 11, 2005	Anderson Mesa	LONEOS	·	3.2 km	MPC · JPL
366866	2005 SR_{133}	—	September 29, 2005	Kitt Peak	Spacewatch	·	1.8 km	MPC · JPL
366867	2005 SS_{143}	—	September 25, 2005	Kitt Peak	Spacewatch	·	1.6 km	MPC · JPL
366868	2005 SP_{156}	—	September 26, 2005	Kitt Peak	Spacewatch	·	1.5 km	MPC · JPL
366869	2005 SA_{159}	—	September 26, 2005	Kitt Peak	Spacewatch	·	1.4 km	MPC · JPL
366870	2005 SD_{163}	—	September 27, 2005	Kitt Peak	Spacewatch	·	2.1 km	MPC · JPL
366871	2005 SB_{165}	—	September 28, 2005	Palomar	NEAT	·	1.3 km	MPC · JPL
366872	2005 SS_{172}	—	September 29, 2005	Kitt Peak	Spacewatch	NEM	2.4 km	MPC · JPL
366873	2005 SN_{192}	—	September 29, 2005	Mount Lemmon	Mount Lemmon Survey	·	2.7 km	MPC · JPL
366874	2005 SX_{200}	—	September 30, 2005	Kitt Peak	Spacewatch	·	1.3 km	MPC · JPL
366875	2005 SW_{207}	—	September 30, 2005	Catalina	CSS	EUN	1.3 km	MPC · JPL
366876	2005 SZ_{211}	—	September 30, 2005	Mount Lemmon	Mount Lemmon Survey	·	1.4 km	MPC · JPL
366877	2005 ST_{218}	—	September 30, 2005	Catalina	CSS	·	1.5 km	MPC · JPL
366878	2005 SF_{220}	—	September 29, 2005	Catalina	CSS	H	670 m	MPC · JPL
366879	2005 SM_{226}	—	September 27, 1992	Kitt Peak	Spacewatch	·	1.3 km	MPC · JPL
366880	2005 SS_{247}	—	September 30, 2005	Kitt Peak	Spacewatch	·	1.4 km	MPC · JPL
366881	2005 SD_{263}	—	September 23, 2005	Kitt Peak	Spacewatch	·	1.1 km	MPC · JPL
366882	2005 SS_{285}	—	September 25, 2005	Apache Point	A. C. Becker	EUN	1.4 km	MPC · JPL
366883	2005 TJ_{14}	—	October 1, 2005	Catalina	CSS	(5)	1.4 km	MPC · JPL
366884	2005 TY_{24}	—	October 1, 2005	Mount Lemmon	Mount Lemmon Survey	·	2.2 km	MPC · JPL
366885	2005 TT_{28}	—	October 2, 2005	Palomar	NEAT	·	2.3 km	MPC · JPL
366886	2005 TQ_{40}	—	October 1, 2005	Kitt Peak	Spacewatch	·	2.1 km	MPC · JPL
366887	2005 TA_{49}	—	October 1, 2005	Mount Lemmon	Mount Lemmon Survey	MIS	2.6 km	MPC · JPL
366888	2005 TX_{58}	—	October 1, 2005	Mount Lemmon	Mount Lemmon Survey	·	1.8 km	MPC · JPL
366889	2005 TY_{74}	—	September 3, 2005	Palomar	NEAT	·	3.0 km	MPC · JPL
366890	2005 TU_{89}	—	October 5, 2005	Mount Lemmon	Mount Lemmon Survey	·	1.2 km	MPC · JPL
366891	2005 TS_{109}	—	September 29, 2005	Kitt Peak	Spacewatch	·	1.9 km	MPC · JPL
366892	2005 TU_{124}	—	October 7, 2005	Kitt Peak	Spacewatch	·	1.9 km	MPC · JPL
366893	2005 TD_{135}	—	October 11, 2005	Kitt Peak	Spacewatch	·	1.1 km	MPC · JPL
366894	2005 TX_{151}	—	October 1, 2005	Mount Lemmon	Mount Lemmon Survey	HOF	2.2 km	MPC · JPL
366895	2005 TC_{152}	—	October 11, 2005	Kitt Peak	Spacewatch	·	2.0 km	MPC · JPL
366896	2005 TZ_{162}	—	October 9, 2005	Kitt Peak	Spacewatch	·	1.8 km	MPC · JPL
366897	2005 TQ_{166}	—	September 29, 2005	Kitt Peak	Spacewatch	HOF	2.8 km	MPC · JPL
366898	2005 TH_{171}	—	October 10, 2005	Anderson Mesa	LONEOS	·	3.1 km	MPC · JPL
366899	2005 TB_{172}	—	October 10, 2005	Kitt Peak	Spacewatch	(5)	1.4 km	MPC · JPL
366900	2005 TM_{194}	—	October 5, 2005	Kitt Peak	Spacewatch	·	1.6 km	MPC · JPL

== 366901–367000 ==
back to top

Designation			Discovery			Properties		Ref
Permanent	Provisional	Named after	Date	Site	Discoverer(s)	Category	Diam.	Ref
366901	2005 UL_{11}	—	October 22, 2005	Kitt Peak	Spacewatch	·	1.7 km	MPC · JPL
366902	2005 UC_{18}	—	October 22, 2005	Catalina	CSS	·	1.3 km	MPC · JPL
366903	2005 UU_{41}	—	October 23, 2005	Goodricke-Pigott	R. A. Tucker	·	1.2 km	MPC · JPL
366904	2005 UZ_{46}	—	October 22, 2005	Kitt Peak	Spacewatch	·	2.0 km	MPC · JPL
366905	2005 UX_{57}	—	October 24, 2005	Kitt Peak	Spacewatch	·	1.7 km	MPC · JPL
366906	2005 UZ_{64}	—	October 20, 2005	Palomar	NEAT	·	1.3 km	MPC · JPL
366907	2005 UN_{65}	—	October 21, 2005	Palomar	NEAT	(5)	1.5 km	MPC · JPL
366908	2005 UW_{93}	—	October 22, 2005	Kitt Peak	Spacewatch	·	1.3 km	MPC · JPL
366909	2005 UG_{98}	—	October 22, 2005	Kitt Peak	Spacewatch	AGN	1.2 km	MPC · JPL
366910	2005 UT_{106}	—	October 22, 2005	Kitt Peak	Spacewatch	·	1.5 km	MPC · JPL
366911	2005 UK_{140}	—	October 25, 2005	Mount Lemmon	Mount Lemmon Survey	·	1.5 km	MPC · JPL
366912	2005 UU_{156}	—	October 23, 2005	Kitt Peak	Spacewatch	·	2.3 km	MPC · JPL
366913	2005 UY_{156}	—	October 25, 2005	Kitt Peak	Spacewatch	·	2.9 km	MPC · JPL
366914	2005 UL_{180}	—	October 24, 2005	Kitt Peak	Spacewatch	·	1.5 km	MPC · JPL
366915	2005 UZ_{184}	—	October 25, 2005	Mount Lemmon	Mount Lemmon Survey	MIS	2.5 km	MPC · JPL
366916	2005 UV_{189}	—	October 27, 2005	Mount Lemmon	Mount Lemmon Survey	·	2.2 km	MPC · JPL
366917	2005 UH_{202}	—	October 25, 2005	Kitt Peak	Spacewatch	·	1.7 km	MPC · JPL
366918	2005 UC_{211}	—	October 27, 2005	Kitt Peak	Spacewatch	·	1.4 km	MPC · JPL
366919	2005 UM_{226}	—	October 25, 2005	Kitt Peak	Spacewatch	·	1.1 km	MPC · JPL
366920	2005 UU_{229}	—	October 25, 2005	Kitt Peak	Spacewatch	PAD	1.7 km	MPC · JPL
366921	2005 UZ_{256}	—	October 25, 2005	Kitt Peak	Spacewatch	AGN	1.4 km	MPC · JPL
366922	2005 UU_{274}	—	October 27, 2005	Mount Lemmon	Mount Lemmon Survey	·	2.1 km	MPC · JPL
366923	2005 UW_{286}	—	October 26, 2005	Kitt Peak	Spacewatch	AGN	1.2 km	MPC · JPL
366924	2005 UT_{296}	—	October 26, 2005	Kitt Peak	Spacewatch	·	1.4 km	MPC · JPL
366925	2005 UA_{305}	—	October 26, 2005	Kitt Peak	Spacewatch	·	2.2 km	MPC · JPL
366926	2005 UE_{331}	—	October 29, 2005	Kitt Peak	Spacewatch	·	2.3 km	MPC · JPL
366927	2005 UC_{350}	—	October 27, 2005	Palomar	NEAT	·	2.5 km	MPC · JPL
366928	2005 UN_{374}	—	October 27, 2005	Kitt Peak	Spacewatch	·	2.2 km	MPC · JPL
366929	2005 UY_{438}	—	October 28, 2005	Socorro	LINEAR	·	2.1 km	MPC · JPL
366930	2005 UF_{439}	—	October 28, 2005	Mount Lemmon	Mount Lemmon Survey	EUP	6.0 km	MPC · JPL
366931	2005 UA_{445}	—	October 31, 2005	Catalina	CSS	EUN	1.3 km	MPC · JPL
366932	2005 UX_{454}	—	October 28, 2005	Socorro	LINEAR	·	1.5 km	MPC · JPL
366933	2005 UT_{460}	—	October 28, 2005	Mount Lemmon	Mount Lemmon Survey	·	1.7 km	MPC · JPL
366934	2005 UH_{480}	—	October 30, 2005	Catalina	CSS	·	1.8 km	MPC · JPL
366935	2005 UG_{485}	—	October 22, 2005	Catalina	CSS	·	1.3 km	MPC · JPL
366936	2005 UX_{513}	—	October 27, 2005	Anderson Mesa	LONEOS	·	1.9 km	MPC · JPL
366937	2005 VH_{6}	—	November 8, 2005	Catalina	CSS	JUN	1.5 km	MPC · JPL
366938	2005 VY_{30}	—	November 4, 2005	Kitt Peak	Spacewatch	NEM	2.7 km	MPC · JPL
366939	2005 VY_{35}	—	November 3, 2005	Mount Lemmon	Mount Lemmon Survey	HOF	2.6 km	MPC · JPL
366940	2005 VP_{49}	—	November 2, 2005	Socorro	LINEAR	·	2.9 km	MPC · JPL
366941	2005 VS_{54}	—	October 25, 2005	Kitt Peak	Spacewatch	MIS	2.5 km	MPC · JPL
366942	2005 VU_{77}	—	October 29, 2005	Catalina	CSS	·	1.7 km	MPC · JPL
366943	2005 VO_{85}	—	November 4, 2005	Kitt Peak	Spacewatch	·	1.5 km	MPC · JPL
366944	2005 VE_{117}	—	November 11, 2005	Kitt Peak	Spacewatch	·	2.2 km	MPC · JPL
366945	2005 VL_{118}	—	November 12, 2005	Socorro	LINEAR	·	1.5 km	MPC · JPL
366946	2005 VF_{120}	—	November 1, 2005	Socorro	LINEAR	·	2.0 km	MPC · JPL
366947	2005 VX_{126}	—	November 1, 2005	Apache Point	A. C. Becker	·	1.3 km	MPC · JPL
366948	2005 VK_{132}	—	November 1, 2005	Apache Point	A. C. Becker	GEF	1.1 km	MPC · JPL
366949	2005 WP_{1}	—	November 21, 2005	Socorro	LINEAR	·	1.3 km	MPC · JPL
366950	2005 WE_{6}	—	November 21, 2005	Catalina	CSS	·	1.4 km	MPC · JPL
366951	2005 WV_{6}	—	November 21, 2005	Catalina	CSS	ADE	2.3 km	MPC · JPL
366952	2005 WZ_{8}	—	October 28, 2005	Kitt Peak	Spacewatch	·	2.2 km	MPC · JPL
366953	2005 WZ_{15}	—	October 25, 2005	Mount Lemmon	Mount Lemmon Survey	·	2.4 km	MPC · JPL
366954	2005 WA_{22}	—	November 21, 2005	Kitt Peak	Spacewatch	·	1.9 km	MPC · JPL
366955	2005 WB_{29}	—	November 21, 2005	Kitt Peak	Spacewatch	·	1.3 km	MPC · JPL
366956	2005 WT_{40}	—	November 25, 2005	Mount Lemmon	Mount Lemmon Survey	·	3.7 km	MPC · JPL
366957	2005 WX_{40}	—	November 19, 2005	Palomar	NEAT	·	1.9 km	MPC · JPL
366958	2005 WZ_{40}	—	November 21, 2005	Kitt Peak	Spacewatch	MIS	2.3 km	MPC · JPL
366959	2005 WS_{46}	—	October 26, 2005	Kitt Peak	Spacewatch	AGN	1.4 km	MPC · JPL
366960	2005 WZ_{46}	—	November 25, 2005	Kitt Peak	Spacewatch	·	2.0 km	MPC · JPL
366961	2005 WP_{53}	—	November 25, 2005	Mount Lemmon	Mount Lemmon Survey	·	1.4 km	MPC · JPL
366962	2005 WD_{55}	—	November 26, 2005	Kitt Peak	Spacewatch	·	2.0 km	MPC · JPL
366963	2005 WY_{75}	—	November 25, 2005	Kitt Peak	Spacewatch	·	2.2 km	MPC · JPL
366964	2005 WP_{79}	—	November 25, 2005	Kitt Peak	Spacewatch	HOF	2.4 km	MPC · JPL
366965	2005 WN_{80}	—	November 25, 2005	Mount Lemmon	Mount Lemmon Survey	·	1.6 km	MPC · JPL
366966	2005 WJ_{81}	—	November 26, 2005	Mount Lemmon	Mount Lemmon Survey	HOF	2.7 km	MPC · JPL
366967	2005 WU_{90}	—	November 28, 2005	Socorro	LINEAR	·	1.2 km	MPC · JPL
366968	2005 WQ_{91}	—	November 28, 2005	Catalina	CSS	·	1.4 km	MPC · JPL
366969	2005 WT_{101}	—	November 29, 2005	Socorro	LINEAR	JUN	1.8 km	MPC · JPL
366970	2005 WX_{103}	—	November 28, 2005	Catalina	CSS	·	1.7 km	MPC · JPL
366971	2005 WR_{107}	—	November 26, 2005	Kitt Peak	Spacewatch	KOR	1.3 km	MPC · JPL
366972	2005 WP_{120}	—	November 29, 2005	Socorro	LINEAR	·	1.5 km	MPC · JPL
366973	2005 WC_{145}	—	November 25, 2005	Kitt Peak	Spacewatch	NEM	2.2 km	MPC · JPL
366974	2005 WP_{146}	—	November 25, 2005	Kitt Peak	Spacewatch	·	2.0 km	MPC · JPL
366975	2005 WJ_{152}	—	November 29, 2005	Kitt Peak	Spacewatch	JUN	1.2 km	MPC · JPL
366976	2005 WM_{155}	—	November 29, 2005	Kitt Peak	Spacewatch	·	2.1 km	MPC · JPL
366977	2005 WO_{184}	—	November 29, 2005	Socorro	LINEAR	·	2.4 km	MPC · JPL
366978	2005 WJ_{187}	—	November 29, 2005	Kitt Peak	Spacewatch	HOF	2.6 km	MPC · JPL
366979	2005 XS_{15}	—	December 1, 2005	Mount Lemmon	Mount Lemmon Survey	MRX	1.1 km	MPC · JPL
366980	2005 XF_{22}	—	December 2, 2005	Mount Lemmon	Mount Lemmon Survey	·	2.0 km	MPC · JPL
366981	2005 XV_{24}	—	December 2, 2005	Mount Lemmon	Mount Lemmon Survey	·	2.3 km	MPC · JPL
366982	2005 XM_{54}	—	December 5, 2005	Kitt Peak	Spacewatch	·	1.9 km	MPC · JPL
366983	2005 XR_{63}	—	December 5, 2005	Kitt Peak	Spacewatch	·	2.2 km	MPC · JPL
366984	2005 YE_{20}	—	November 10, 2005	Mount Lemmon	Mount Lemmon Survey	·	3.0 km	MPC · JPL
366985	2005 YU_{21}	—	December 24, 2005	Kitt Peak	Spacewatch	KOR	1.8 km	MPC · JPL
366986	2005 YP_{24}	—	December 24, 2005	Kitt Peak	Spacewatch	·	2.8 km	MPC · JPL
366987	2005 YV_{41}	—	December 2, 2005	Mount Lemmon	Mount Lemmon Survey	EOS	2.4 km	MPC · JPL
366988	2005 YX_{47}	—	December 26, 2005	Kitt Peak	Spacewatch	·	3.4 km	MPC · JPL
366989	2005 YS_{81}	—	December 24, 2005	Kitt Peak	Spacewatch	EOS	2.3 km	MPC · JPL
366990	2005 YV_{81}	—	December 24, 2005	Kitt Peak	Spacewatch	·	2.2 km	MPC · JPL
366991	2005 YC_{128}	—	December 28, 2005	Mount Lemmon	Mount Lemmon Survey	EOS	2.5 km	MPC · JPL
366992	2005 YF_{158}	—	December 27, 2005	Kitt Peak	Spacewatch	AGN	1.2 km	MPC · JPL
366993	2005 YO_{167}	—	December 27, 2005	Kitt Peak	Spacewatch	·	3.4 km	MPC · JPL
366994	2005 YF_{186}	—	December 28, 2005	Catalina	CSS	·	2.9 km	MPC · JPL
366995	2005 YR_{188}	—	December 28, 2005	Mount Lemmon	Mount Lemmon Survey	·	3.0 km	MPC · JPL
366996	2005 YE_{200}	—	December 26, 2005	Kitt Peak	Spacewatch	·	2.1 km	MPC · JPL
366997	2005 YY_{234}	—	December 28, 2005	Mount Lemmon	Mount Lemmon Survey	·	2.3 km	MPC · JPL
366998	2005 YW_{266}	—	December 26, 2005	Kitt Peak	Spacewatch	(5)	1.9 km	MPC · JPL
366999	2006 AS_{1}	—	January 2, 2006	Mount Lemmon	Mount Lemmon Survey	·	2.7 km	MPC · JPL
367000	2006 AY_{8}	—	January 2, 2006	Mount Lemmon	Mount Lemmon Survey	·	2.0 km	MPC · JPL

back to top

== See also ==
- Meanings of minor-planet names: 366001–367000
