= List of minor planets: 368001–369000 =

The following is a partial list of minor planets, running from minor-planet number 368001 through 369000, inclusive. The primary data for this and other partial lists is based on JPL's "Small-Body Orbital Elements" and data available from the Minor Planet Center. Critical list information is also provided by the MPC, unless otherwise specified from Lowell Observatory. A detailed description of the table's columns and additional sources are given on the main page including a complete list of every page in this series, and a statistical break-up on the dynamical classification of minor planets.

Also see the summary list of all named bodies in numerical and alphabetical order, and the corresponding naming citations for the number range of this particular list. New namings may only be added to this list after official publication, as the preannouncement of names is condemned by the Working Group for Small Bodies Nomenclature of the International Astronomical Union.

Near-Earth obj.	MBA (inner)	MBA (outer)	Centaur
Mars-crosser	MBA (middle)	Jupiter trojan	Trans-Neptunian obj.
Unclassified

== 368001–368100 ==
Designation			Discovery			Properties		Ref
Permanent	Provisional	Named after	Date	Site	Discoverer(s)	Category	Diam.	Ref
368001	2012 FT_{44}	—	September 29, 2003	Kitt Peak	Spacewatch	THM	2.9 km	MPC · JPL
368002	2012 FU_{44}	—	January 27, 2006	Mount Lemmon	Mount Lemmon Survey	·	3.5 km	MPC · JPL
368003	2012 FT_{45}	—	January 26, 2006	Mount Lemmon	Mount Lemmon Survey	THM	2.4 km	MPC · JPL
368004	2012 FB_{53}	—	October 24, 2005	Kitt Peak	Spacewatch	AGN	1.5 km	MPC · JPL
368005	2012 FS_{53}	—	November 16, 2009	Mount Lemmon	Mount Lemmon Survey	·	1.9 km	MPC · JPL
368006	2012 FQ_{56}	—	September 29, 2005	Mount Lemmon	Mount Lemmon Survey	·	1.9 km	MPC · JPL
368007	2012 FL_{58}	—	March 24, 2003	Kitt Peak	Spacewatch	·	2.0 km	MPC · JPL
368008	2012 FT_{58}	—	December 31, 2002	Kitt Peak	Spacewatch	·	1.4 km	MPC · JPL
368009	2012 FA_{59}	—	December 18, 2001	Socorro	LINEAR	·	2.8 km	MPC · JPL
368010	2012 FW_{59}	—	February 26, 2007	Kitt Peak	Spacewatch	·	3.9 km	MPC · JPL
368011	2012 FX_{61}	—	November 17, 1998	Kitt Peak	Spacewatch	·	1.9 km	MPC · JPL
368012	2012 FS_{63}	—	December 22, 2005	Kitt Peak	Spacewatch	·	1.8 km	MPC · JPL
368013	2012 FB_{66}	—	October 30, 2005	Kitt Peak	Spacewatch	HOF	2.5 km	MPC · JPL
368014	2012 FX_{66}	—	March 28, 2008	Mount Lemmon	Mount Lemmon Survey	·	1.1 km	MPC · JPL
368015	2012 FW_{69}	—	October 27, 2005	Kitt Peak	Spacewatch	GEF	1.4 km	MPC · JPL
368016	2012 FL_{70}	—	November 3, 2010	Mount Lemmon	Mount Lemmon Survey	·	2.6 km	MPC · JPL
368017	2012 FV_{71}	—	January 9, 2006	Kitt Peak	Spacewatch	EOS	4.5 km	MPC · JPL
368018	2012 FB_{72}	—	March 11, 2003	Kitt Peak	Spacewatch	·	2.5 km	MPC · JPL
368019	2012 FW_{76}	—	March 24, 2003	Kitt Peak	Spacewatch	NEM	2.6 km	MPC · JPL
368020	2012 FM_{77}	—	August 27, 2000	Cerro Tololo	Deep Ecliptic Survey	·	2.6 km	MPC · JPL
368021	2012 FW_{77}	—	January 10, 2000	Kitt Peak	Spacewatch	EOS	2.8 km	MPC · JPL
368022	2012 FL_{80}	—	January 8, 2006	Catalina	CSS	·	5.2 km	MPC · JPL
368023	2012 FM_{80}	—	September 23, 2005	Kitt Peak	Spacewatch	·	2.2 km	MPC · JPL
368024	2012 FR_{82}	—	October 11, 2005	Kitt Peak	Spacewatch	·	3.2 km	MPC · JPL
368025	2012 GS_{2}	—	September 22, 2003	Kitt Peak	Spacewatch	HYG	3.2 km	MPC · JPL
368026	2012 GJ_{7}	—	October 31, 2005	Mount Lemmon	Mount Lemmon Survey	GEF	1.4 km	MPC · JPL
368027	2012 GD_{19}	—	January 23, 2006	Kitt Peak	Spacewatch	·	2.7 km	MPC · JPL
368028	2012 GM_{19}	—	January 23, 2006	Kitt Peak	Spacewatch	·	2.6 km	MPC · JPL
368029	2012 GX_{19}	—	April 9, 2003	Palomar	NEAT	·	2.4 km	MPC · JPL
368030	2012 GX_{27}	—	December 18, 2004	Mount Lemmon	Mount Lemmon Survey	·	3.7 km	MPC · JPL
368031	2012 GG_{30}	—	August 18, 2009	Kitt Peak	Spacewatch	WIT	1.2 km	MPC · JPL
368032	2012 GT_{30}	—	September 15, 2010	Kitt Peak	Spacewatch	·	1.2 km	MPC · JPL
368033	2012 GJ_{33}	—	October 30, 2005	Mount Lemmon	Mount Lemmon Survey	·	1.9 km	MPC · JPL
368034	2012 GK_{34}	—	April 27, 2001	Kitt Peak	Spacewatch	·	4.0 km	MPC · JPL
368035	2012 GW_{34}	—	September 17, 2003	Kitt Peak	Spacewatch	·	2.5 km	MPC · JPL
368036	2012 GP_{38}	—	November 22, 2009	Catalina	CSS	·	3.0 km	MPC · JPL
368037	2012 HD_{4}	—	August 20, 2003	Campo Imperatore	CINEOS	EOS	2.0 km	MPC · JPL
368038	2012 HJ_{5}	—	April 11, 2007	Kitt Peak	Spacewatch	·	2.1 km	MPC · JPL
368039	2012 HS_{8}	—	November 23, 2009	Mount Lemmon	Mount Lemmon Survey	EOS	2.2 km	MPC · JPL
368040	2012 HY_{8}	—	December 13, 1999	Kitt Peak	Spacewatch	EOS	2.4 km	MPC · JPL
368041	2012 HG_{11}	—	January 11, 2011	Mount Lemmon	Mount Lemmon Survey	·	2.5 km	MPC · JPL
368042	2012 HW_{12}	—	January 15, 2005	Kitt Peak	Spacewatch	·	3.4 km	MPC · JPL
368043	2012 HK_{21}	—	March 31, 2003	Kitt Peak	Spacewatch	·	3.2 km	MPC · JPL
368044	2012 HP_{21}	—	December 12, 2004	Kitt Peak	Spacewatch	VER	4.1 km	MPC · JPL
368045	2012 HM_{25}	—	January 10, 2011	Catalina	CSS	EOS	2.4 km	MPC · JPL
368046	2012 HR_{26}	—	September 27, 2003	Kitt Peak	Spacewatch	·	3.7 km	MPC · JPL
368047	2012 HS_{26}	—	April 12, 1999	Kitt Peak	Spacewatch	·	1.7 km	MPC · JPL
368048	2012 HJ_{27}	—	October 2, 2009	Mount Lemmon	Mount Lemmon Survey	·	2.9 km	MPC · JPL
368049	2012 HR_{31}	—	February 25, 2007	Mount Lemmon	Mount Lemmon Survey	AGN	1.5 km	MPC · JPL
368050	2012 HS_{31}	—	February 21, 2003	Palomar	NEAT	·	1.6 km	MPC · JPL
368051	2012 HK_{36}	—	September 5, 2008	Kitt Peak	Spacewatch	EUP	3.1 km	MPC · JPL
368052	2012 HB_{37}	—	June 9, 2007	Catalina	CSS	·	4.6 km	MPC · JPL
368053	2012 HM_{42}	—	January 27, 2007	Mount Lemmon	Mount Lemmon Survey	·	2.0 km	MPC · JPL
368054	2012 HH_{43}	—	October 19, 2000	Kitt Peak	Spacewatch	HOF	2.6 km	MPC · JPL
368055	2012 HF_{45}	—	March 22, 1996	Kitt Peak	Spacewatch	·	2.2 km	MPC · JPL
368056	2012 HB_{51}	—	May 11, 2007	Kitt Peak	Spacewatch	·	3.3 km	MPC · JPL
368057	2012 HH_{53}	—	November 4, 2005	Mount Lemmon	Mount Lemmon Survey	·	2.2 km	MPC · JPL
368058	2012 HK_{57}	—	December 14, 2001	Socorro	LINEAR	GEF	1.5 km	MPC · JPL
368059	2012 HX_{58}	—	March 11, 2007	Kitt Peak	Spacewatch	HOF	3.1 km	MPC · JPL
368060	2012 HN_{62}	—	May 23, 2003	Kitt Peak	Spacewatch	HOF	2.7 km	MPC · JPL
368061	2012 HZ_{63}	—	October 24, 2005	Mauna Kea	A. Boattini	·	2.5 km	MPC · JPL
368062	2012 HG_{66}	—	December 13, 2004	Catalina	CSS	·	2.8 km	MPC · JPL
368063	2012 HE_{69}	—	October 24, 2003	Apache Point	SDSS	·	3.2 km	MPC · JPL
368064	2012 HE_{72}	—	February 10, 2002	Socorro	LINEAR	MRX	1.2 km	MPC · JPL
368065	2012 HH_{75}	—	November 5, 2010	Mount Lemmon	Mount Lemmon Survey	·	1.5 km	MPC · JPL
368066	2012 JU_{3}	—	January 28, 2007	Catalina	CSS	ADE	2.0 km	MPC · JPL
368067	2012 JU_{5}	—	March 1, 2011	Kitt Peak	Spacewatch	·	2.8 km	MPC · JPL
368068	2012 JL_{8}	—	September 28, 1997	Kitt Peak	Spacewatch	·	3.9 km	MPC · JPL
368069	2012 JB_{14}	—	April 2, 1995	Kitt Peak	Spacewatch	·	1.6 km	MPC · JPL
368070	2012 JF_{41}	—	October 22, 2003	Anderson Mesa	LONEOS	·	5.6 km	MPC · JPL
368071	2012 JP_{58}	—	November 25, 2005	Catalina	CSS	·	2.1 km	MPC · JPL
368072	2012 JS_{59}	—	October 18, 2009	Mount Lemmon	Mount Lemmon Survey	·	2.6 km	MPC · JPL
368073	2012 KP	—	November 10, 2009	Kitt Peak	Spacewatch	·	3.0 km	MPC · JPL
368074	2012 KB_{14}	—	August 18, 2009	Kitt Peak	Spacewatch	AGN	1.6 km	MPC · JPL
368075	2012 KV_{14}	—	December 27, 1999	Kitt Peak	Spacewatch	·	3.6 km	MPC · JPL
368076	2012 KM_{32}	—	May 9, 2007	Kitt Peak	Spacewatch	·	2.6 km	MPC · JPL
368077	2012 KZ_{46}	—	August 1, 2000	Socorro	LINEAR	·	1.7 km	MPC · JPL
368078	2012 LB_{8}	—	May 20, 2005	Mount Lemmon	Mount Lemmon Survey	CYB	6.5 km	MPC · JPL
368079	2012 MR	—	April 10, 2005	Kitt Peak	Spacewatch	CYB	4.9 km	MPC · JPL
368080	2012 MZ_{15}	—	October 4, 1996	Kitt Peak	Spacewatch	·	1.8 km	MPC · JPL
368081	2012 QG_{14}	—	October 26, 2008	Kitt Peak	Spacewatch	·	3.4 km	MPC · JPL
368082	2012 RR_{11}	—	August 19, 2006	Kitt Peak	Spacewatch	VER	3.2 km	MPC · JPL
368083	2012 ST_{64}	—	September 20, 2003	Palomar	NEAT	·	2.9 km	MPC · JPL
368084	2012 TL_{226}	—	January 8, 2010	Mount Lemmon	Mount Lemmon Survey	(5)	1.3 km	MPC · JPL
368085	2012 TE_{296}	—	March 25, 2010	Mount Lemmon	Mount Lemmon Survey	·	2.2 km	MPC · JPL
368086	2012 TE_{297}	—	October 26, 2001	Kitt Peak	Spacewatch	L5	10 km	MPC · JPL
368087	2012 UM_{112}	—	December 18, 2004	Mount Lemmon	Mount Lemmon Survey	·	1.8 km	MPC · JPL
368088	2012 US_{130}	—	April 6, 2011	Kitt Peak	Spacewatch	NYS	1.1 km	MPC · JPL
368089	2012 VF_{33}	—	September 23, 2001	Kitt Peak	Spacewatch	·	2.6 km	MPC · JPL
368090	2012 XT_{118}	—	October 20, 2007	Mount Lemmon	Mount Lemmon Survey	·	2.0 km	MPC · JPL
368091	2012 XC_{140}	—	January 19, 2004	Kitt Peak	Spacewatch	·	3.3 km	MPC · JPL
368092	2013 AK_{4}	—	May 17, 2010	WISE	WISE	·	6.0 km	MPC · JPL
368093	2013 AN_{29}	—	November 8, 2007	Kitt Peak	Spacewatch	·	2.5 km	MPC · JPL
368094	2013 AR_{42}	—	March 3, 2006	Catalina	CSS	·	1.8 km	MPC · JPL
368095	2013 AF_{44}	—	March 26, 2003	Kitt Peak	Spacewatch	·	2.2 km	MPC · JPL
368096	2013 AP_{64}	—	December 10, 2004	Socorro	LINEAR	·	2.0 km	MPC · JPL
368097	2013 BN	—	November 2, 2010	Mount Lemmon	Mount Lemmon Survey	L4	10 km	MPC · JPL
368098	2013 BP_{70}	—	June 6, 2010	ESA OGS	ESA OGS	V	770 m	MPC · JPL
368099	2013 CP	—	June 16, 2010	WISE	WISE	HIL · 3:2	5.1 km	MPC · JPL
368100	2013 CU_{1}	—	May 2, 2010	WISE	WISE	·	3.2 km	MPC · JPL

== 368101–368200 ==
back to top

Designation			Discovery			Properties		Ref
Permanent	Provisional	Named after	Date	Site	Discoverer(s)	Category	Diam.	Ref
368101	2013 CF_{9}	—	July 24, 2003	Palomar	NEAT	H	700 m	MPC · JPL
368102	2013 CW_{191}	—	July 30, 2008	Kitt Peak	Spacewatch	L4	8.6 km	MPC · JPL
368103	2013 EN	—	May 3, 2005	Kitt Peak	Deep Lens Survey	H	620 m	MPC · JPL
368104	2013 EK_{86}	—	October 6, 1999	Socorro	LINEAR	PHO · slow	3.7 km	MPC · JPL
368105	2013 EZ_{105}	—	April 16, 2002	Socorro	LINEAR	·	5.8 km	MPC · JPL
368106	2013 EE_{121}	—	March 10, 2002	Kitt Peak	Spacewatch	·	2.3 km	MPC · JPL
368107	2013 FJ_{14}	—	November 15, 1995	Kitt Peak	Spacewatch	·	890 m	MPC · JPL
368108	2013 GE_{19}	—	September 26, 2000	Haleakala	NEAT	·	1.3 km	MPC · JPL
368109	2013 GX_{36}	—	October 14, 2010	Mount Lemmon	Mount Lemmon Survey	·	3.9 km	MPC · JPL
368110	2013 GA_{39}	—	February 23, 2007	Kitt Peak	Spacewatch	THM	2.6 km	MPC · JPL
368111	2013 GV_{39}	—	February 3, 2008	Catalina	CSS	·	2.0 km	MPC · JPL
368112	2013 GK_{52}	—	March 16, 2007	Catalina	CSS	T_{j} (2.98) · EUP	4.3 km	MPC · JPL
368113	2013 GS_{56}	—	October 22, 2006	Catalina	CSS	AGN	1.5 km	MPC · JPL
368114	2013 GP_{70}	—	October 4, 2004	Kitt Peak	Spacewatch	·	4.2 km	MPC · JPL
368115	2013 GQ_{79}	—	December 11, 2004	Bergisch Gladbach	W. Bickel	ERI	1.8 km	MPC · JPL
368116 Half-Moon	2013 GU_{92}	Half-Moon	April 4, 2000	Anderson Mesa	Wasserman, L. H.	JUN · slow	1.5 km	MPC · JPL
368117	2013 GY_{100}	—	October 7, 2004	Socorro	LINEAR	EOS	3.2 km	MPC · JPL
368118	2013 GQ_{110}	—	April 23, 2004	Siding Spring	SSS	·	1.9 km	MPC · JPL
368119	2013 GC_{114}	—	July 3, 2005	Palomar	NEAT	·	1.7 km	MPC · JPL
368120	2013 GM_{116}	—	December 6, 2005	Kitt Peak	Spacewatch	·	4.2 km	MPC · JPL
368121	2013 GL_{130}	—	February 27, 2009	Catalina	CSS	PHO	1.4 km	MPC · JPL
368122	2013 GW_{130}	—	October 4, 2007	Catalina	CSS	·	970 m	MPC · JPL
368123	2013 HB_{4}	—	October 25, 2005	Kitt Peak	Spacewatch	·	3.6 km	MPC · JPL
368124	2013 HQ_{18}	—	April 12, 2004	Catalina	CSS	EUN	1.4 km	MPC · JPL
368125	2013 HM_{21}	—	August 16, 2006	Siding Spring	SSS	·	1.6 km	MPC · JPL
368126	2013 JH_{8}	—	August 21, 2006	Kitt Peak	Spacewatch	MAS	670 m	MPC · JPL
368127	2013 JO_{15}	—	September 13, 2005	Catalina	CSS	·	1.5 km	MPC · JPL
368128	2013 JF_{18}	—	June 6, 2001	Palomar	NEAT	·	2.2 km	MPC · JPL
368129	2013 JL_{32}	—	October 21, 2003	Socorro	LINEAR	LIX	5.6 km	MPC · JPL
368130	2013 JM_{32}	—	September 28, 2000	Socorro	LINEAR	·	2.6 km	MPC · JPL
368131	2013 JH_{35}	—	March 17, 2004	Catalina	CSS	ADE	2.4 km	MPC · JPL
368132	2013 JL_{35}	—	September 18, 2010	Mount Lemmon	Mount Lemmon Survey	BRG	1.7 km	MPC · JPL
368133	2013 JZ_{36}	—	November 18, 2006	Kitt Peak	Spacewatch	·	2.3 km	MPC · JPL
368134	2013 JM_{37}	—	January 18, 2009	Kitt Peak	Spacewatch	·	920 m	MPC · JPL
368135	2013 JU_{37}	—	April 30, 2008	Mount Lemmon	Mount Lemmon Survey	·	3.7 km	MPC · JPL
368136	2013 JW_{39}	—	December 22, 2005	Kitt Peak	Spacewatch	EOS	2.2 km	MPC · JPL
368137	2013 KA_{1}	—	October 23, 2001	Socorro	LINEAR	·	2.8 km	MPC · JPL
368138	2013 KW_{6}	—	June 8, 2004	Kitt Peak	Spacewatch	·	2.2 km	MPC · JPL
368139	2013 KN_{13}	—	December 17, 2007	Kitt Peak	Spacewatch	·	1.3 km	MPC · JPL
368140	2013 KV_{13}	—	December 25, 1995	Kitt Peak	Spacewatch	H	660 m	MPC · JPL
368141	2013 LC_{5}	—	November 6, 2010	Mount Lemmon	Mount Lemmon Survey	·	1.7 km	MPC · JPL
368142	2013 LF_{12}	—	March 11, 2007	Kitt Peak	Spacewatch	·	3.2 km	MPC · JPL
368143	2013 LW_{13}	—	January 5, 2000	Socorro	LINEAR	·	2.2 km	MPC · JPL
368144	2013 LZ_{15}	—	February 19, 2004	Socorro	LINEAR	·	3.8 km	MPC · JPL
368145	2013 LG_{17}	—	March 21, 1999	Apache Point	SDSS	·	1 km	MPC · JPL
368146	2013 LD_{21}	—	May 17, 2002	Kitt Peak	Spacewatch	·	3.4 km	MPC · JPL
368147	2013 LM_{21}	—	November 4, 2004	Kitt Peak	Spacewatch	LIX	4.8 km	MPC · JPL
368148	2013 LV_{21}	—	October 31, 2010	Mount Lemmon	Mount Lemmon Survey	·	2.9 km	MPC · JPL
368149	2013 LX_{22}	—	January 11, 2002	Kitt Peak	Spacewatch	·	900 m	MPC · JPL
368150	1992 DC	—	February 26, 1992	Palomar	C. S. Shoemaker	·	1.6 km	MPC · JPL
368151	1995 SO_{12}	—	September 18, 1995	Kitt Peak	Spacewatch	·	1.8 km	MPC · JPL
368152	1995 SF_{15}	—	September 18, 1995	Kitt Peak	Spacewatch	·	900 m	MPC · JPL
368153	1995 UX_{1}	—	October 22, 1995	Modra	A. Galád, A. Pravda	·	1.5 km	MPC · JPL
368154	1997 WS_{10}	—	November 22, 1997	Kitt Peak	Spacewatch	·	470 m	MPC · JPL
368155	1998 BS_{29}	—	January 25, 1998	Kitt Peak	Spacewatch	·	670 m	MPC · JPL
368156	1998 OL_{3}	—	July 23, 1998	Caussols	ODAS	·	1.6 km	MPC · JPL
368157	1998 RM_{44}	—	September 14, 1998	Socorro	LINEAR	·	610 m	MPC · JPL
368158	1998 SE_{53}	—	September 30, 1998	Kitt Peak	Spacewatch	HIL · 3:2	5.9 km	MPC · JPL
368159	1998 XO_{23}	—	December 11, 1998	Kitt Peak	Spacewatch	EOS	3.4 km	MPC · JPL
368160	1999 HW_{2}	—	April 20, 1999	Socorro	LINEAR	·	2.2 km	MPC · JPL
368161	1999 RU_{23}	—	September 7, 1999	Socorro	LINEAR	H	660 m	MPC · JPL
368162	1999 RU_{67}	—	September 7, 1999	Socorro	LINEAR	·	3.5 km	MPC · JPL
368163	1999 RE_{198}	—	September 9, 1999	Socorro	LINEAR	·	720 m	MPC · JPL
368164	1999 RR_{208}	—	September 8, 1999	Socorro	LINEAR	·	2.3 km	MPC · JPL
368165	1999 UF_{34}	—	October 31, 1999	Kitt Peak	Spacewatch	·	1.1 km	MPC · JPL
368166	1999 UE_{38}	—	October 17, 1999	Kitt Peak	Spacewatch	·	860 m	MPC · JPL
368167	1999 VV_{65}	—	November 4, 1999	Socorro	LINEAR	·	1.1 km	MPC · JPL
368168	1999 VA_{106}	—	November 9, 1999	Socorro	LINEAR	·	880 m	MPC · JPL
368169	1999 VS_{128}	—	November 9, 1999	Kitt Peak	Spacewatch	·	1.9 km	MPC · JPL
368170	1999 VX_{175}	—	November 1, 1999	Catalina	CSS	·	1 km	MPC · JPL
368171	1999 XZ_{5}	—	December 4, 1999	Catalina	CSS	·	2.3 km	MPC · JPL
368172	1999 XJ_{147}	—	December 7, 1999	Kitt Peak	Spacewatch	MAS	610 m	MPC · JPL
368173	2000 AW_{43}	—	January 2, 2000	Kitt Peak	Spacewatch	·	2.4 km	MPC · JPL
368174	2000 AT_{215}	—	January 7, 2000	Kitt Peak	Spacewatch	NYS	1.3 km	MPC · JPL
368175	2000 BO_{10}	—	January 28, 2000	Kitt Peak	Spacewatch	·	2.8 km	MPC · JPL
368176	2000 BQ_{12}	—	January 28, 2000	Kitt Peak	Spacewatch	·	1.1 km	MPC · JPL
368177	2000 DA_{117}	—	February 25, 2000	Kitt Peak	Spacewatch	·	3.6 km	MPC · JPL
368178	2000 KW_{9}	—	May 28, 2000	Socorro	LINEAR	·	1.1 km	MPC · JPL
368179	2000 QM_{163}	—	August 31, 2000	Socorro	LINEAR	·	3.1 km	MPC · JPL
368180	2000 RD_{14}	—	September 1, 2000	Socorro	LINEAR	EUN	1.2 km	MPC · JPL
368181	2000 RR_{14}	—	September 1, 2000	Socorro	LINEAR	·	1.7 km	MPC · JPL
368182	2000 RJ_{16}	—	September 1, 2000	Socorro	LINEAR	·	840 m	MPC · JPL
368183	2000 RC_{63}	—	September 2, 2000	Socorro	LINEAR	·	1.5 km	MPC · JPL
368184	2000 RN_{77}	—	September 8, 2000	Socorro	LINEAR	ATE	380 m	MPC · JPL
368185	2000 RU_{97}	—	September 5, 2000	Anderson Mesa	LONEOS	·	2.0 km	MPC · JPL
368186	2000 SU_{19}	—	September 23, 2000	Socorro	LINEAR	·	3.3 km	MPC · JPL
368187	2000 SV_{51}	—	September 23, 2000	Socorro	LINEAR	·	2.4 km	MPC · JPL
368188	2000 SZ_{72}	—	September 24, 2000	Socorro	LINEAR	·	800 m	MPC · JPL
368189	2000 SX_{133}	—	September 5, 2000	Anderson Mesa	LONEOS	·	760 m	MPC · JPL
368190	2000 SV_{184}	—	September 20, 2000	Haleakala	NEAT	·	690 m	MPC · JPL
368191	2000 SW_{246}	—	September 24, 2000	Socorro	LINEAR	·	870 m	MPC · JPL
368192	2000 UU_{24}	—	October 24, 2000	Socorro	LINEAR	·	2.0 km	MPC · JPL
368193	2000 UZ_{64}	—	October 25, 2000	Socorro	LINEAR	·	730 m	MPC · JPL
368194	2000 WO_{4}	—	November 19, 2000	Socorro	LINEAR	·	820 m	MPC · JPL
368195	2000 WU_{197}	—	November 21, 2000	Socorro	LINEAR	·	2.6 km	MPC · JPL
368196	2000 YM	—	December 16, 2000	Socorro	LINEAR	·	2.4 km	MPC · JPL
368197	2000 YZ_{54}	—	December 30, 2000	Socorro	LINEAR	·	4.2 km	MPC · JPL
368198	2001 BY_{29}	—	December 30, 2000	Socorro	LINEAR	·	1.5 km	MPC · JPL
368199	2001 DE_{18}	—	February 16, 2001	Socorro	LINEAR	·	3.7 km	MPC · JPL
368200	2001 FB_{139}	—	March 21, 2001	Haleakala	NEAT	EUP	4.1 km	MPC · JPL

== 368201–368300 ==
back to top

Designation			Discovery			Properties		Ref
Permanent	Provisional	Named after	Date	Site	Discoverer(s)	Category	Diam.	Ref
368201	2001 FV_{173}	—	March 24, 2001	Kitt Peak	Spacewatch	·	3.1 km	MPC · JPL
368202	2001 HJ_{19}	—	April 24, 2001	Kitt Peak	Spacewatch	·	3.3 km	MPC · JPL
368203	2001 KO_{2}	—	May 21, 2001	Haleakala	NEAT	APO · PHA · critical	270 m	MPC · JPL
368204	2001 MO_{31}	—	October 22, 2008	Mount Lemmon	Mount Lemmon Survey	·	3.4 km	MPC · JPL
368205	2001 PU_{45}	—	August 12, 2001	Palomar	NEAT	·	4.4 km	MPC · JPL
368206	2001 QG_{151}	—	August 23, 2001	Socorro	LINEAR	·	1.9 km	MPC · JPL
368207	2001 QG_{259}	—	August 25, 2001	Socorro	LINEAR	·	1.4 km	MPC · JPL
368208	2001 QH_{333}	—	August 19, 2001	Socorro	LINEAR	·	2.1 km	MPC · JPL
368209	2001 RG_{5}	—	September 8, 2001	Socorro	LINEAR	·	1.2 km	MPC · JPL
368210	2001 RK_{10}	—	September 10, 2001	Socorro	LINEAR	·	800 m	MPC · JPL
368211	2001 RT_{14}	—	September 10, 2001	Socorro	LINEAR	·	1.2 km	MPC · JPL
368212	2001 RA_{23}	—	September 7, 2001	Socorro	LINEAR	·	1.2 km	MPC · JPL
368213	2001 RG_{40}	—	September 10, 2001	Socorro	LINEAR	·	1.3 km	MPC · JPL
368214	2001 RR_{42}	—	September 11, 2001	Socorro	LINEAR	·	1.1 km	MPC · JPL
368215	2001 SR_{93}	—	September 20, 2001	Socorro	LINEAR	·	980 m	MPC · JPL
368216	2001 SR_{150}	—	September 17, 2001	Socorro	LINEAR	·	720 m	MPC · JPL
368217	2001 SP_{172}	—	September 16, 2001	Socorro	LINEAR	·	860 m	MPC · JPL
368218	2001 ST_{349}	—	September 19, 2001	Socorro	LINEAR	ADE	2.0 km	MPC · JPL
368219	2001 SM_{353}	—	September 22, 2001	Anderson Mesa	LONEOS	·	1.5 km	MPC · JPL
368220	2001 TW_{25}	—	October 14, 2001	Socorro	LINEAR	·	1.1 km	MPC · JPL
368221	2001 TF_{80}	—	October 13, 2001	Socorro	LINEAR	·	1.5 km	MPC · JPL
368222	2001 TU_{83}	—	October 14, 2001	Socorro	LINEAR	·	1.1 km	MPC · JPL
368223	2001 TR_{89}	—	October 14, 2001	Socorro	LINEAR	·	1.3 km	MPC · JPL
368224	2001 TA_{118}	—	October 15, 2001	Socorro	LINEAR	·	1.7 km	MPC · JPL
368225	2001 TE_{159}	—	October 11, 2001	Palomar	NEAT	·	860 m	MPC · JPL
368226	2001 TY_{161}	—	October 11, 2001	Palomar	NEAT	(5)	1.2 km	MPC · JPL
368227	2001 TG_{168}	—	October 15, 2001	Socorro	LINEAR	·	1.8 km	MPC · JPL
368228	2001 TP_{204}	—	October 11, 2001	Socorro	LINEAR	·	980 m	MPC · JPL
368229	2001 TV_{217}	—	October 14, 2001	Kitt Peak	Spacewatch	·	1.3 km	MPC · JPL
368230	2001 TJ_{237}	—	October 8, 2001	Palomar	NEAT	EUN	1.1 km	MPC · JPL
368231	2001 UR_{16}	—	October 21, 2001	Socorro	LINEAR	·	1.9 km	MPC · JPL
368232	2001 UY_{37}	—	October 17, 2001	Socorro	LINEAR	·	1.1 km	MPC · JPL
368233	2001 UK_{52}	—	October 17, 2001	Socorro	LINEAR	·	1.8 km	MPC · JPL
368234	2001 UL_{57}	—	October 17, 2001	Socorro	LINEAR	·	800 m	MPC · JPL
368235	2001 UJ_{96}	—	September 20, 2001	Socorro	LINEAR	HNS	1.3 km	MPC · JPL
368236	2001 UZ_{96}	—	October 17, 2001	Socorro	LINEAR	·	920 m	MPC · JPL
368237	2001 UZ_{114}	—	October 22, 2001	Socorro	LINEAR	·	1.3 km	MPC · JPL
368238	2001 UO_{133}	—	October 21, 2001	Socorro	LINEAR	·	950 m	MPC · JPL
368239	2001 UP_{134}	—	October 21, 2001	Socorro	LINEAR	·	1.9 km	MPC · JPL
368240	2001 UX_{157}	—	October 23, 2001	Socorro	LINEAR	MAR	1.3 km	MPC · JPL
368241	2001 UY_{221}	—	October 24, 2001	Socorro	LINEAR	·	1.9 km	MPC · JPL
368242	2001 VN_{10}	—	November 10, 2001	Socorro	LINEAR	·	2.1 km	MPC · JPL
368243	2001 VQ_{11}	—	November 10, 2001	Socorro	LINEAR	·	2.2 km	MPC · JPL
368244	2001 VJ_{105}	—	November 12, 2001	Socorro	LINEAR	EUN	1.6 km	MPC · JPL
368245	2001 VJ_{110}	—	November 12, 2001	Socorro	LINEAR	(5)	1.2 km	MPC · JPL
368246	2001 WE_{55}	—	November 19, 2001	Socorro	LINEAR	(5)	1.2 km	MPC · JPL
368247	2001 WT_{65}	—	November 20, 2001	Socorro	LINEAR	·	1.3 km	MPC · JPL
368248	2001 WU_{100}	—	November 16, 2001	Kitt Peak	Spacewatch	(5)	1.1 km	MPC · JPL
368249	2001 WN_{101}	—	November 17, 2001	Socorro	LINEAR	·	1.2 km	MPC · JPL
368250	2001 XM_{19}	—	December 9, 2001	Socorro	LINEAR	BAR	2.1 km	MPC · JPL
368251	2001 XD_{65}	—	December 10, 2001	Socorro	LINEAR	·	3.8 km	MPC · JPL
368252	2001 XN_{83}	—	December 11, 2001	Socorro	LINEAR	·	1.7 km	MPC · JPL
368253	2001 XE_{102}	—	October 18, 2001	Socorro	LINEAR	·	3.2 km	MPC · JPL
368254	2001 XE_{103}	—	December 14, 2001	Socorro	LINEAR	·	2.5 km	MPC · JPL
368255	2001 XK_{138}	—	December 14, 2001	Socorro	LINEAR	·	1.1 km	MPC · JPL
368256	2001 XR_{162}	—	December 14, 2001	Socorro	LINEAR	·	1.2 km	MPC · JPL
368257	2001 XR_{178}	—	December 14, 2001	Socorro	LINEAR	·	2.5 km	MPC · JPL
368258	2001 XT_{237}	—	December 15, 2001	Socorro	LINEAR	EUN	1.5 km	MPC · JPL
368259	2001 XD_{239}	—	December 15, 2001	Socorro	LINEAR	·	1.8 km	MPC · JPL
368260	2001 XG_{262}	—	December 13, 2001	Palomar	NEAT	·	1.2 km	MPC · JPL
368261	2001 YO_{71}	—	December 18, 2001	Socorro	LINEAR	·	1.4 km	MPC · JPL
368262	2001 YF_{110}	—	December 18, 2001	Socorro	LINEAR	·	2.1 km	MPC · JPL
368263	2001 YF_{137}	—	December 22, 2001	Socorro	LINEAR	·	2.8 km	MPC · JPL
368264	2002 AW_{144}	—	January 13, 2002	Socorro	LINEAR	·	1.6 km	MPC · JPL
368265	2002 AV_{180}	—	December 23, 2001	Palomar	NEAT	HNS	1.6 km	MPC · JPL
368266	2002 CN_{14}	—	February 8, 2002	Socorro	LINEAR	H	560 m	MPC · JPL
368267	2002 CN_{58}	—	February 12, 2002	Socorro	LINEAR	H	750 m	MPC · JPL
368268	2002 CK_{68}	—	January 7, 2002	Kitt Peak	Spacewatch	·	1.9 km	MPC · JPL
368269	2002 CV_{70}	—	January 9, 2002	Socorro	LINEAR	HNS	1.5 km	MPC · JPL
368270	2002 CG_{199}	—	January 12, 2002	Kitt Peak	Spacewatch	·	1.7 km	MPC · JPL
368271	2002 CV_{206}	—	February 10, 2002	Socorro	LINEAR	·	1.4 km	MPC · JPL
368272	2002 CB_{215}	—	February 10, 2002	Socorro	LINEAR	·	3.8 km	MPC · JPL
368273	2002 CC_{255}	—	January 13, 2002	Socorro	LINEAR	·	2.0 km	MPC · JPL
368274	2002 CQ_{304}	—	February 15, 2002	Socorro	LINEAR	·	2.2 km	MPC · JPL
368275	2002 EN_{2}	—	March 5, 2002	Eskridge	Farpoint	·	2.2 km	MPC · JPL
368276	2002 GG_{27}	—	April 9, 2002	Socorro	LINEAR	PHO	2.7 km	MPC · JPL
368277	2002 JX_{9}	—	May 6, 2002	Socorro	LINEAR	PHO	1.3 km	MPC · JPL
368278	2002 JZ_{100}	—	May 5, 2002	Socorro	LINEAR	PHO	1.5 km	MPC · JPL
368279	2002 JG_{138}	—	May 9, 2002	Palomar	NEAT	V	750 m	MPC · JPL
368280	2002 LK_{55}	—	June 14, 2002	Palomar	NEAT	·	1.5 km	MPC · JPL
368281	2002 MY_{5}	—	June 17, 2002	Palomar	NEAT	·	2.7 km	MPC · JPL
368282	2002 NH_{7}	—	July 10, 2002	Palomar	NEAT	·	1.2 km	MPC · JPL
368283	2002 NO_{17}	—	July 12, 2002	Palomar	NEAT	·	1.3 km	MPC · JPL
368284	2002 NH_{31}	—	July 9, 2002	Socorro	LINEAR	·	1.4 km	MPC · JPL
368285	2002 NM_{31}	—	July 8, 2002	Palomar	NEAT	NYS	1.1 km	MPC · JPL
368286	2002 ND_{32}	—	July 13, 2002	Socorro	LINEAR	H	600 m	MPC · JPL
368287	2002 NU_{49}	—	July 13, 2002	Haleakala	NEAT	·	970 m	MPC · JPL
368288	2002 NX_{63}	—	July 8, 2002	Palomar	NEAT	EOS	2.1 km	MPC · JPL
368289	2002 NC_{74}	—	July 14, 2002	Palomar	NEAT	·	3.0 km	MPC · JPL
368290	2002 NV_{75}	—	October 31, 2008	Mount Lemmon	Mount Lemmon Survey	·	2.5 km	MPC · JPL
368291	2002 NM_{78}	—	October 29, 2008	Mount Lemmon	Mount Lemmon Survey	·	2.7 km	MPC · JPL
368292	2002 NV_{80}	—	September 5, 2008	Socorro	LINEAR	·	3.9 km	MPC · JPL
368293	2002 ON_{23}	—	July 22, 2002	Palomar	NEAT	PHO	1.4 km	MPC · JPL
368294	2002 OF_{24}	—	July 23, 2002	Palomar	NEAT	·	1.3 km	MPC · JPL
368295	2002 OS_{26}	—	July 19, 2002	Palomar	NEAT	·	2.5 km	MPC · JPL
368296	2002 OL_{27}	—	July 22, 2002	Palomar	NEAT	EOS	5.3 km	MPC · JPL
368297	2002 OU_{30}	—	July 20, 2002	Palomar	NEAT	·	3.8 km	MPC · JPL
368298	2002 OA_{34}	—	July 22, 2002	Palomar	NEAT	V	770 m	MPC · JPL
368299	2002 OP_{34}	—	October 5, 2002	Apache Point	SDSS	·	3.3 km	MPC · JPL
368300	2002 OV_{34}	—	March 10, 2005	Apache Point	SDSS	·	2.4 km	MPC · JPL

== 368301–368400 ==
back to top

Designation			Discovery			Properties		Ref
Permanent	Provisional	Named after	Date	Site	Discoverer(s)	Category	Diam.	Ref
368301	2002 OH_{35}	—	September 29, 2008	La Sagra	OAM	·	2.7 km	MPC · JPL
368302	2002 OL_{35}	—	October 22, 2003	Kitt Peak	Spacewatch	·	3.1 km	MPC · JPL
368303	2002 OQ_{35}	—	September 22, 2008	Kitt Peak	Spacewatch	·	2.1 km	MPC · JPL
368304	2002 ON_{37}	—	September 28, 2003	Kitt Peak	Spacewatch	EOS	2.1 km	MPC · JPL
368305	2002 PV_{2}	—	August 3, 2002	Palomar	NEAT	TIR	3.3 km	MPC · JPL
368306	2002 PB_{6}	—	August 2, 2002	Campo Imperatore	CINEOS	·	5.1 km	MPC · JPL
368307	2002 PK_{20}	—	August 6, 2002	Palomar	NEAT	·	2.7 km	MPC · JPL
368308	2002 PP_{23}	—	August 6, 2002	Palomar	NEAT	EUP	4.4 km	MPC · JPL
368309	2002 PM_{65}	—	August 5, 2002	Palomar	NEAT	·	1.2 km	MPC · JPL
368310	2002 PA_{67}	—	August 6, 2002	Palomar	NEAT	·	1.2 km	MPC · JPL
368311	2002 PD_{80}	—	August 4, 2002	Palomar	NEAT	TIR	3.9 km	MPC · JPL
368312	2002 PP_{100}	—	August 11, 2002	Palomar	NEAT	·	2.8 km	MPC · JPL
368313	2002 PY_{103}	—	August 12, 2002	Socorro	LINEAR	·	1.0 km	MPC · JPL
368314	2002 PQ_{104}	—	August 12, 2002	Socorro	LINEAR	·	3.1 km	MPC · JPL
368315	2002 PU_{105}	—	August 12, 2002	Socorro	LINEAR	·	3.5 km	MPC · JPL
368316	2002 PQ_{114}	—	August 13, 2002	Anderson Mesa	LONEOS	·	3.6 km	MPC · JPL
368317	2002 PG_{122}	—	August 13, 2002	Anderson Mesa	LONEOS	·	4.1 km	MPC · JPL
368318	2002 PH_{131}	—	August 14, 2002	Palomar	NEAT	TIR	3.6 km	MPC · JPL
368319	2002 PR_{131}	—	August 15, 2002	Socorro	LINEAR	TIR	3.7 km	MPC · JPL
368320	2002 PE_{140}	—	August 14, 2002	Bergisch Gladbach	W. Bickel	MAS	730 m	MPC · JPL
368321	2002 PA_{163}	—	August 8, 2002	Palomar	S. F. Hönig	·	1.1 km	MPC · JPL
368322	2002 PW_{176}	—	August 7, 2002	Palomar	NEAT	TIR	2.9 km	MPC · JPL
368323	2002 PT_{179}	—	August 7, 2002	Palomar	NEAT	·	3.5 km	MPC · JPL
368324	2002 PV_{181}	—	August 15, 2002	Palomar	NEAT	·	2.9 km	MPC · JPL
368325	2002 PH_{184}	—	August 11, 2002	Palomar	NEAT	·	3.2 km	MPC · JPL
368326	2002 PX_{186}	—	August 11, 2002	Palomar	NEAT	LIX	3.0 km	MPC · JPL
368327	2002 PE_{189}	—	August 7, 2002	Palomar	NEAT	·	2.5 km	MPC · JPL
368328	2002 PS_{195}	—	January 15, 2004	Palomar	NEAT	·	4.8 km	MPC · JPL
368329	2002 PA_{198}	—	September 29, 2008	Mount Lemmon	Mount Lemmon Survey	·	5.2 km	MPC · JPL
368330	2002 PO_{199}	—	April 25, 2007	Mount Lemmon	Mount Lemmon Survey	·	2.6 km	MPC · JPL
368331	2002 PQ_{201}	—	October 23, 2003	Kitt Peak	Spacewatch	VER	3.0 km	MPC · JPL
368332	2002 PB_{202}	—	October 6, 2008	Catalina	CSS	EOS	2.2 km	MPC · JPL
368333	2002 PD_{202}	—	April 26, 2006	Cerro Tololo	Deep Ecliptic Survey	·	2.5 km	MPC · JPL
368334	2002 QB	—	August 16, 2002	Haleakala	NEAT	·	5.1 km	MPC · JPL
368335	2002 QZ	—	August 16, 2002	Palomar	NEAT	·	2.7 km	MPC · JPL
368336	2002 QC_{4}	—	August 16, 2002	Haleakala	NEAT	·	950 m	MPC · JPL
368337	2002 QX_{8}	—	August 13, 2002	Palomar	NEAT	·	1.3 km	MPC · JPL
368338	2002 QP_{13}	—	August 12, 2002	Socorro	LINEAR	·	2.4 km	MPC · JPL
368339	2002 QK_{19}	—	August 26, 2002	Palomar	NEAT	·	4.3 km	MPC · JPL
368340	2002 QL_{37}	—	August 30, 2002	Kitt Peak	Spacewatch	·	3.1 km	MPC · JPL
368341	2002 QJ_{60}	—	August 16, 2002	Palomar	NEAT	·	1.2 km	MPC · JPL
368342	2002 QS_{64}	—	August 18, 2002	Palomar	NEAT	·	2.7 km	MPC · JPL
368343	2002 QX_{66}	—	August 18, 2002	Palomar	NEAT	·	1.1 km	MPC · JPL
368344	2002 QQ_{84}	—	August 26, 2002	Palomar	NEAT	·	2.9 km	MPC · JPL
368345	2002 QP_{88}	—	August 30, 2002	Palomar	NEAT	·	2.9 km	MPC · JPL
368346	2002 QE_{89}	—	August 27, 2002	Palomar	NEAT	TIR	2.6 km	MPC · JPL
368347	2002 QG_{100}	—	August 18, 2002	Palomar	NEAT	·	2.3 km	MPC · JPL
368348	2002 QB_{104}	—	August 26, 2002	Palomar	NEAT	·	1.5 km	MPC · JPL
368349	2002 QH_{104}	—	August 26, 2002	Palomar	NEAT	·	3.5 km	MPC · JPL
368350	2002 QJ_{104}	—	August 17, 2002	Palomar	NEAT	·	2.5 km	MPC · JPL
368351	2002 QK_{113}	—	August 27, 2002	Palomar	NEAT	(31811)	3.8 km	MPC · JPL
368352	2002 QD_{115}	—	August 16, 2002	Palomar	NEAT	URS	3.9 km	MPC · JPL
368353	2002 QC_{117}	—	August 2, 2002	Campo Imperatore	CINEOS	EOS	1.9 km	MPC · JPL
368354	2002 QE_{120}	—	August 29, 2002	Palomar	NEAT	NYS	1.2 km	MPC · JPL
368355	2002 QF_{121}	—	August 16, 2002	Palomar	NEAT	·	6.1 km	MPC · JPL
368356	2002 QM_{121}	—	August 28, 2002	Palomar	NEAT	·	2.7 km	MPC · JPL
368357	2002 QP_{121}	—	August 16, 2002	Palomar	NEAT	·	2.2 km	MPC · JPL
368358	2002 QP_{124}	—	August 16, 2002	Palomar	NEAT	·	890 m	MPC · JPL
368359	2002 QS_{128}	—	August 18, 2002	Palomar	NEAT	THM	1.9 km	MPC · JPL
368360	2002 QB_{139}	—	August 17, 2002	Palomar	NEAT	NYS	950 m	MPC · JPL
368361	2002 QW_{140}	—	August 12, 2002	Socorro	LINEAR	·	4.3 km	MPC · JPL
368362	2002 QZ_{140}	—	August 16, 2002	Palomar	NEAT	·	1.4 km	MPC · JPL
368363	2002 QM_{142}	—	January 16, 2005	Kitt Peak	Spacewatch	·	4.0 km	MPC · JPL
368364	2002 QF_{147}	—	March 19, 2010	WISE	WISE	·	3.0 km	MPC · JPL
368365	2002 QN_{150}	—	May 14, 2005	Mount Lemmon	Mount Lemmon Survey	MAS	860 m	MPC · JPL
368366	2002 QW_{151}	—	September 20, 2008	Mount Lemmon	Mount Lemmon Survey	EOS	2.0 km	MPC · JPL
368367	2002 QX_{151}	—	September 19, 2008	Kitt Peak	Spacewatch	·	2.9 km	MPC · JPL
368368	2002 QN_{153}	—	May 14, 2001	Kitt Peak	Spacewatch	·	3.6 km	MPC · JPL
368369	2002 QK_{154}	—	September 17, 2006	Kitt Peak	Spacewatch	·	970 m	MPC · JPL
368370	2002 RS_{6}	—	September 1, 2002	Haleakala	NEAT	MAS	800 m	MPC · JPL
368371	2002 RS_{9}	—	September 4, 2002	Palomar	NEAT	·	1.3 km	MPC · JPL
368372	2002 RS_{15}	—	September 4, 2002	Anderson Mesa	LONEOS	·	1.1 km	MPC · JPL
368373	2002 RN_{22}	—	September 4, 2002	Anderson Mesa	LONEOS	·	1.2 km	MPC · JPL
368374	2002 RZ_{23}	—	September 4, 2002	Anderson Mesa	LONEOS	·	1.3 km	MPC · JPL
368375	2002 RG_{71}	—	September 4, 2002	Palomar	NEAT	·	1.1 km	MPC · JPL
368376	2002 RP_{86}	—	September 5, 2002	Socorro	LINEAR	·	2.8 km	MPC · JPL
368377	2002 RZ_{88}	—	September 5, 2002	Socorro	LINEAR	LIX	3.5 km	MPC · JPL
368378	2002 RR_{96}	—	September 5, 2002	Socorro	LINEAR	EOS	3.0 km	MPC · JPL
368379	2002 RM_{102}	—	September 5, 2002	Socorro	LINEAR	·	4.0 km	MPC · JPL
368380	2002 RG_{127}	—	September 10, 2002	Palomar	NEAT	·	3.6 km	MPC · JPL
368381	2002 RU_{153}	—	September 12, 2002	Palomar	NEAT	·	1.3 km	MPC · JPL
368382	2002 RQ_{183}	—	September 11, 2002	Palomar	NEAT	·	3.4 km	MPC · JPL
368383	2002 RJ_{209}	—	September 14, 2002	Palomar	NEAT	·	1.3 km	MPC · JPL
368384	2002 RB_{211}	—	September 13, 2002	Anderson Mesa	LONEOS	T_{j} (2.93)	4.2 km	MPC · JPL
368385	2002 RV_{219}	—	September 15, 2002	Palomar	NEAT	·	1.3 km	MPC · JPL
368386	2002 RK_{242}	—	September 14, 2002	Palomar	NEAT	EOS	1.8 km	MPC · JPL
368387	2002 RS_{265}	—	September 5, 2002	Haleakala	NEAT	MAS	580 m	MPC · JPL
368388	2002 RW_{270}	—	September 1, 2002	Palomar	NEAT	·	3.6 km	MPC · JPL
368389	2002 RQ_{271}	—	September 4, 2002	Palomar	NEAT	V	610 m	MPC · JPL
368390	2002 RK_{276}	—	September 14, 2002	Palomar	Palomar	HYG	2.9 km	MPC · JPL
368391	2002 RS_{279}	—	September 14, 2002	Palomar	NEAT	·	2.5 km	MPC · JPL
368392	2002 SN_{6}	—	September 27, 2002	Palomar	NEAT	EOS	2.6 km	MPC · JPL
368393	2002 SZ_{7}	—	September 27, 2002	Palomar	NEAT	NYS	1.3 km	MPC · JPL
368394	2002 SR_{11}	—	September 27, 2002	Palomar	NEAT	NYS	1.3 km	MPC · JPL
368395	2002 SQ_{18}	—	September 26, 2002	Palomar	NEAT	THM	2.6 km	MPC · JPL
368396	2002 SQ_{22}	—	September 26, 2002	Palomar	NEAT	·	1.2 km	MPC · JPL
368397	2002 SU_{48}	—	September 30, 2002	Socorro	LINEAR	·	1.7 km	MPC · JPL
368398	2002 SO_{63}	—	September 27, 2002	Palomar	NEAT	NYS	1.1 km	MPC · JPL
368399	2002 TK_{17}	—	October 2, 2002	Socorro	LINEAR	·	1.5 km	MPC · JPL
368400	2002 TW_{22}	—	October 2, 2002	Socorro	LINEAR	·	1.2 km	MPC · JPL

== 368401–368500 ==
back to top

Designation			Discovery			Properties		Ref
Permanent	Provisional	Named after	Date	Site	Discoverer(s)	Category	Diam.	Ref
368401	2002 TP_{50}	—	October 2, 2002	Socorro	LINEAR	·	5.0 km	MPC · JPL
368402	2002 TV_{57}	—	August 22, 2002	Palomar	NEAT	·	3.0 km	MPC · JPL
368403	2002 TZ_{75}	—	October 1, 2002	Anderson Mesa	LONEOS	·	1.3 km	MPC · JPL
368404	2002 TG_{84}	—	October 2, 2002	Haleakala	NEAT	·	4.0 km	MPC · JPL
368405	2002 TO_{99}	—	October 4, 2002	Palomar	NEAT	LIX	3.9 km	MPC · JPL
368406	2002 TV_{144}	—	October 2, 2002	Socorro	LINEAR	THM	2.2 km	MPC · JPL
368407	2002 TL_{148}	—	October 5, 2002	Palomar	NEAT	·	4.6 km	MPC · JPL
368408	2002 TX_{148}	—	October 5, 2002	Palomar	NEAT	EOS	2.6 km	MPC · JPL
368409	2002 TB_{155}	—	October 5, 2002	Palomar	NEAT	·	3.4 km	MPC · JPL
368410	2002 TZ_{165}	—	October 3, 2002	Palomar	NEAT	·	3.8 km	MPC · JPL
368411	2002 TA_{166}	—	October 3, 2002	Palomar	NEAT	·	6.3 km	MPC · JPL
368412	2002 TA_{171}	—	October 3, 2002	Palomar	NEAT	·	4.4 km	MPC · JPL
368413	2002 TB_{189}	—	October 5, 2002	Socorro	LINEAR	·	1.4 km	MPC · JPL
368414	2002 TF_{225}	—	October 8, 2002	Anderson Mesa	LONEOS	·	1.2 km	MPC · JPL
368415	2002 TG_{234}	—	October 6, 2002	Socorro	LINEAR	·	1.8 km	MPC · JPL
368416	2002 TK_{237}	—	October 6, 2002	Socorro	LINEAR	·	4.5 km	MPC · JPL
368417	2002 TQ_{244}	—	October 10, 2002	Palomar	NEAT	MAS	700 m	MPC · JPL
368418	2002 TP_{264}	—	October 10, 2002	Socorro	LINEAR	·	4.1 km	MPC · JPL
368419	2002 TA_{274}	—	October 9, 2002	Socorro	LINEAR	·	3.5 km	MPC · JPL
368420	2002 TT_{278}	—	October 10, 2002	Socorro	LINEAR	·	2.1 km	MPC · JPL
368421	2002 TF_{313}	—	July 17, 2001	Haleakala	NEAT	·	4.1 km	MPC · JPL
368422	2002 TL_{336}	—	October 5, 2002	Apache Point	SDSS	·	2.6 km	MPC · JPL
368423	2002 TH_{357}	—	October 10, 2002	Apache Point	SDSS	·	950 m	MPC · JPL
368424	2002 TR_{364}	—	October 10, 2002	Apache Point	SDSS	NYS	1.3 km	MPC · JPL
368425	2002 UM_{2}	—	October 28, 2002	Socorro	LINEAR	PHO	1.6 km	MPC · JPL
368426	2002 UY_{2}	—	October 28, 2002	Palomar	NEAT	·	3.9 km	MPC · JPL
368427	2002 UE_{4}	—	October 28, 2002	Socorro	LINEAR	T_{j} (2.98)	4.2 km	MPC · JPL
368428	2002 UD_{12}	—	October 30, 2002	Socorro	LINEAR	·	4.9 km	MPC · JPL
368429	2002 UP_{16}	—	October 30, 2002	Palomar	NEAT	·	4.3 km	MPC · JPL
368430	2002 UY_{55}	—	October 29, 2002	Apache Point	SDSS	·	1.3 km	MPC · JPL
368431	2002 VT_{5}	—	November 2, 2002	La Palma	La Palma	NYS	1.1 km	MPC · JPL
368432	2002 VL_{8}	—	October 16, 2002	Palomar	NEAT	·	1.7 km	MPC · JPL
368433	2002 VE_{20}	—	November 4, 2002	Haleakala	NEAT	·	1.2 km	MPC · JPL
368434	2002 VM_{47}	—	November 7, 2002	Socorro	LINEAR	·	1.2 km	MPC · JPL
368435	2002 VW_{59}	—	November 3, 2002	Haleakala	NEAT	·	970 m	MPC · JPL
368436	2002 VA_{76}	—	November 7, 2002	Socorro	LINEAR	·	1.3 km	MPC · JPL
368437	2002 VB_{125}	—	November 13, 2002	Socorro	LINEAR	·	1.2 km	MPC · JPL
368438	2002 VU_{147}	—	February 28, 2008	Kitt Peak	Spacewatch	·	2.0 km	MPC · JPL
368439	2002 WH_{15}	—	November 28, 2002	Anderson Mesa	LONEOS	PHO	1.1 km	MPC · JPL
368440	2002 WH_{23}	—	November 24, 2002	Palomar	NEAT	·	1.4 km	MPC · JPL
368441	2002 XP_{7}	—	November 6, 2002	Socorro	LINEAR	·	1.3 km	MPC · JPL
368442	2002 XH_{16}	—	December 3, 2002	Palomar	NEAT	·	4.8 km	MPC · JPL
368443	2002 XZ_{84}	—	December 11, 2002	Socorro	LINEAR	·	1.9 km	MPC · JPL
368444	2002 XQ_{96}	—	November 5, 2002	Socorro	LINEAR	·	2.0 km	MPC · JPL
368445	2003 BH_{11}	—	January 26, 2003	Anderson Mesa	LONEOS	·	2.6 km	MPC · JPL
368446	2003 EZ_{21}	—	March 6, 2003	Socorro	LINEAR	·	2.2 km	MPC · JPL
368447	2003 EV_{37}	—	March 8, 2003	Anderson Mesa	LONEOS	(194)	1.7 km	MPC · JPL
368448	2003 FM_{35}	—	March 23, 2003	Kitt Peak	Spacewatch	·	1.8 km	MPC · JPL
368449	2003 GR_{13}	—	March 24, 2003	Kitt Peak	Spacewatch	·	1.5 km	MPC · JPL
368450	2003 GE_{45}	—	March 26, 2003	Palomar	NEAT	·	2.0 km	MPC · JPL
368451	2003 GM_{56}	—	April 8, 2003	Kitt Peak	Spacewatch	·	2.2 km	MPC · JPL
368452	2003 JL_{16}	—	May 8, 2003	Haleakala	NEAT	·	2.4 km	MPC · JPL
368453	2003 OX_{31}	—	July 25, 2003	Socorro	LINEAR	·	3.2 km	MPC · JPL
368454	2003 QU_{23}	—	August 21, 2003	Palomar	NEAT	·	850 m	MPC · JPL
368455	2003 QA_{46}	—	August 23, 2003	Socorro	LINEAR	·	880 m	MPC · JPL
368456	2003 QH_{112}	—	August 21, 2003	Campo Imperatore	CINEOS	·	620 m	MPC · JPL
368457	2003 SP_{49}	—	September 18, 2003	Palomar	NEAT	·	2.1 km	MPC · JPL
368458	2003 SB_{77}	—	September 19, 2003	Kitt Peak	Spacewatch	·	2.5 km	MPC · JPL
368459	2003 SG_{79}	—	September 19, 2003	Kitt Peak	Spacewatch	·	770 m	MPC · JPL
368460	2003 SU_{89}	—	September 18, 2003	Palomar	NEAT	NAE	4.1 km	MPC · JPL
368461	2003 SS_{93}	—	September 18, 2003	Kitt Peak	Spacewatch	·	690 m	MPC · JPL
368462	2003 SC_{101}	—	September 20, 2003	Palomar	NEAT	·	3.4 km	MPC · JPL
368463	2003 SE_{102}	—	September 20, 2003	Socorro	LINEAR	·	2.4 km	MPC · JPL
368464	2003 SL_{102}	—	September 20, 2003	Socorro	LINEAR	·	1.6 km	MPC · JPL
368465	2003 SR_{132}	—	September 19, 2003	Kitt Peak	Spacewatch	·	2.9 km	MPC · JPL
368466	2003 SZ_{135}	—	September 19, 2003	Campo Imperatore	CINEOS	·	2.9 km	MPC · JPL
368467	2003 SB_{146}	—	September 20, 2003	Palomar	NEAT	·	3.3 km	MPC · JPL
368468	2003 SY_{166}	—	August 28, 2003	Socorro	LINEAR	·	830 m	MPC · JPL
368469	2003 SX_{179}	—	September 19, 2003	Palomar	NEAT	·	2.4 km	MPC · JPL
368470	2003 SM_{180}	—	September 19, 2003	Kitt Peak	Spacewatch	·	840 m	MPC · JPL
368471	2003 SU_{185}	—	September 17, 2003	Kitt Peak	Spacewatch	·	820 m	MPC · JPL
368472	2003 SQ_{191}	—	September 19, 2003	Kitt Peak	Spacewatch	EOS	2.6 km	MPC · JPL
368473	2003 SY_{192}	—	September 20, 2003	Palomar	NEAT	·	930 m	MPC · JPL
368474	2003 SM_{199}	—	September 21, 2003	Anderson Mesa	LONEOS	·	870 m	MPC · JPL
368475	2003 SY_{223}	—	September 30, 2003	Socorro	LINEAR	·	1.4 km	MPC · JPL
368476	2003 SM_{226}	—	September 26, 2003	Socorro	LINEAR	EOS	2.8 km	MPC · JPL
368477	2003 SX_{253}	—	September 27, 2003	Socorro	LINEAR	·	1.1 km	MPC · JPL
368478	2003 SV_{255}	—	September 27, 2003	Kitt Peak	Spacewatch	BAP	1.1 km	MPC · JPL
368479	2003 SP_{283}	—	September 20, 2003	Socorro	LINEAR	·	2.2 km	MPC · JPL
368480	2003 SD_{286}	—	September 20, 2003	Palomar	NEAT	EOS	2.7 km	MPC · JPL
368481	2003 SG_{291}	—	September 29, 2003	Socorro	LINEAR	·	1.1 km	MPC · JPL
368482	2003 ST_{292}	—	September 25, 2003	Haleakala	NEAT	·	1.1 km	MPC · JPL
368483	2003 SM_{296}	—	September 22, 2003	Palomar	NEAT	·	840 m	MPC · JPL
368484	2003 SZ_{296}	—	September 16, 2003	Palomar	NEAT	·	2.8 km	MPC · JPL
368485	2003 SK_{303}	—	September 20, 2003	Kitt Peak	Spacewatch	·	950 m	MPC · JPL
368486	2003 SM_{313}	—	September 20, 2003	Socorro	LINEAR	·	860 m	MPC · JPL
368487	2003 SU_{327}	—	September 19, 2003	Socorro	LINEAR	·	1.8 km	MPC · JPL
368488	2003 SN_{378}	—	September 26, 2003	Apache Point	SDSS	·	700 m	MPC · JPL
368489	2003 TF	—	October 1, 2003	Desert Eagle	W. K. Y. Yeung	·	1.0 km	MPC · JPL
368490	2003 TN_{35}	—	October 1, 2003	Kitt Peak	Spacewatch	·	1.0 km	MPC · JPL
368491	2003 TE_{36}	—	October 1, 2003	Kitt Peak	Spacewatch	·	2.8 km	MPC · JPL
368492	2003 TT_{44}	—	October 3, 2003	Kitt Peak	Spacewatch	EOS	2.1 km	MPC · JPL
368493	2003 UC_{1}	—	October 16, 2003	Palomar	NEAT	EOS	3.1 km	MPC · JPL
368494	2003 UE_{21}	—	October 22, 2003	Socorro	LINEAR	H	650 m	MPC · JPL
368495	2003 UA_{25}	—	October 15, 2003	Anderson Mesa	LONEOS	·	2.8 km	MPC · JPL
368496	2003 UY_{59}	—	October 17, 2003	Anderson Mesa	LONEOS	·	4.5 km	MPC · JPL
368497	2003 UH_{60}	—	October 17, 2003	Anderson Mesa	LONEOS	·	3.5 km	MPC · JPL
368498	2003 UR_{75}	—	October 17, 2003	Kitt Peak	Spacewatch	·	810 m	MPC · JPL
368499	2003 UH_{77}	—	October 17, 2003	Anderson Mesa	LONEOS	·	3.3 km	MPC · JPL
368500	2003 UZ_{92}	—	October 20, 2003	Palomar	NEAT	·	2.5 km	MPC · JPL

== 368501–368600 ==
back to top

Designation			Discovery			Properties		Ref
Permanent	Provisional	Named after	Date	Site	Discoverer(s)	Category	Diam.	Ref
368501	2003 UL_{104}	—	October 18, 2003	Kitt Peak	Spacewatch	·	700 m	MPC · JPL
368502	2003 UQ_{120}	—	October 18, 2003	Kitt Peak	Spacewatch	·	750 m	MPC · JPL
368503	2003 UY_{127}	—	October 21, 2003	Kitt Peak	Spacewatch	·	4.3 km	MPC · JPL
368504	2003 UY_{139}	—	October 16, 2003	Anderson Mesa	LONEOS	·	2.3 km	MPC · JPL
368505	2003 UH_{145}	—	October 18, 2003	Anderson Mesa	LONEOS	·	4.2 km	MPC · JPL
368506	2003 UY_{147}	—	October 18, 2003	Palomar	NEAT	·	1.1 km	MPC · JPL
368507	2003 UD_{155}	—	October 20, 2003	Socorro	LINEAR	·	2.8 km	MPC · JPL
368508	2003 US_{192}	—	October 23, 2003	Haleakala	NEAT	·	2.9 km	MPC · JPL
368509	2003 UQ_{199}	—	October 21, 2003	Socorro	LINEAR	·	870 m	MPC · JPL
368510	2003 UK_{212}	—	October 23, 2003	Kitt Peak	Spacewatch	V	840 m	MPC · JPL
368511	2003 UR_{225}	—	October 22, 2003	Kitt Peak	Spacewatch	·	2.7 km	MPC · JPL
368512	2003 UH_{232}	—	September 27, 2003	Kitt Peak	Spacewatch	·	680 m	MPC · JPL
368513	2003 UC_{239}	—	September 29, 2003	Kitt Peak	Spacewatch	·	3.3 km	MPC · JPL
368514	2003 UG_{242}	—	October 19, 2003	Kitt Peak	Spacewatch	·	750 m	MPC · JPL
368515	2003 UK_{254}	—	October 24, 2003	Kitt Peak	Spacewatch	·	1.5 km	MPC · JPL
368516	2003 UJ_{258}	—	October 25, 2003	Socorro	LINEAR	·	2.6 km	MPC · JPL
368517	2003 UF_{326}	—	October 2, 2003	Kitt Peak	Spacewatch	·	660 m	MPC · JPL
368518	2003 UW_{355}	—	October 19, 2003	Kitt Peak	Spacewatch	·	680 m	MPC · JPL
368519	2003 UD_{374}	—	September 22, 2003	Kitt Peak	Spacewatch	·	2.3 km	MPC · JPL
368520	2003 UL_{382}	—	October 22, 2003	Apache Point	SDSS	·	680 m	MPC · JPL
368521	2003 WP_{8}	—	November 16, 2003	Kitt Peak	Spacewatch	·	3.1 km	MPC · JPL
368522	2003 WX_{18}	—	November 19, 2003	Socorro	LINEAR	·	850 m	MPC · JPL
368523	2003 WZ_{18}	—	November 19, 2003	Socorro	LINEAR	·	4.6 km	MPC · JPL
368524	2003 WS_{19}	—	November 19, 2003	Socorro	LINEAR	EOS	2.3 km	MPC · JPL
368525	2003 WV_{32}	—	October 24, 2003	Kitt Peak	Spacewatch	·	2.6 km	MPC · JPL
368526	2003 WE_{43}	—	November 18, 2003	Kitt Peak	Spacewatch	·	780 m	MPC · JPL
368527	2003 WZ_{43}	—	November 19, 2003	Palomar	NEAT	·	4.3 km	MPC · JPL
368528	2003 WA_{47}	—	October 21, 2003	Kitt Peak	Spacewatch	·	820 m	MPC · JPL
368529	2003 WX_{55}	—	November 20, 2003	Socorro	LINEAR	·	1.3 km	MPC · JPL
368530	2003 WN_{70}	—	November 20, 2003	Kitt Peak	Spacewatch	·	1.7 km	MPC · JPL
368531	2003 WN_{82}	—	November 19, 2003	Palomar	NEAT	·	820 m	MPC · JPL
368532	2003 WK_{91}	—	November 18, 2003	Kitt Peak	Spacewatch	·	900 m	MPC · JPL
368533	2003 WK_{92}	—	November 18, 2003	Palomar	NEAT	·	2.9 km	MPC · JPL
368534	2003 WC_{102}	—	November 21, 2003	Socorro	LINEAR	·	2.9 km	MPC · JPL
368535	2003 WH_{114}	—	November 20, 2003	Socorro	LINEAR	·	3.8 km	MPC · JPL
368536	2003 WH_{115}	—	November 20, 2003	Socorro	LINEAR	·	960 m	MPC · JPL
368537	2003 WL_{119}	—	November 20, 2003	Socorro	LINEAR	·	2.6 km	MPC · JPL
368538	2003 WH_{131}	—	November 21, 2003	Palomar	NEAT	URS	4.4 km	MPC · JPL
368539	2003 WN_{148}	—	November 24, 2003	Socorro	LINEAR	·	5.7 km	MPC · JPL
368540	2003 WZ_{157}	—	November 29, 2003	Socorro	LINEAR	·	3.3 km	MPC · JPL
368541	2003 WV_{158}	—	November 29, 2003	Kitt Peak	Spacewatch	·	3.6 km	MPC · JPL
368542	2003 WO_{165}	—	November 30, 2003	Kitt Peak	Spacewatch	·	3.2 km	MPC · JPL
368543	2003 WO_{168}	—	November 19, 2003	Catalina	CSS	·	2.2 km	MPC · JPL
368544	2003 WC_{192}	—	November 19, 2003	Socorro	LINEAR	·	790 m	MPC · JPL
368545	2003 YL_{1}	—	December 3, 2003	Socorro	LINEAR	H	740 m	MPC · JPL
368546	2003 YX_{22}	—	December 16, 2003	Kitt Peak	Spacewatch	·	860 m	MPC · JPL
368547	2003 YP_{57}	—	December 19, 2003	Socorro	LINEAR	·	4.3 km	MPC · JPL
368548	2003 YR_{75}	—	December 18, 2003	Socorro	LINEAR	·	3.3 km	MPC · JPL
368549	2003 YR_{81}	—	December 18, 2003	Socorro	LINEAR	·	990 m	MPC · JPL
368550	2003 YY_{95}	—	December 19, 2003	Socorro	LINEAR	·	3.4 km	MPC · JPL
368551	2003 YZ_{120}	—	December 27, 2003	Socorro	LINEAR	·	1 km	MPC · JPL
368552	2003 YD_{124}	—	December 28, 2003	Socorro	LINEAR	·	3.3 km	MPC · JPL
368553	2003 YB_{140}	—	December 28, 2003	Socorro	LINEAR	·	3.3 km	MPC · JPL
368554	2003 YJ_{143}	—	December 28, 2003	Socorro	LINEAR	·	5.1 km	MPC · JPL
368555	2003 YC_{154}	—	December 29, 2003	Catalina	CSS	·	5.2 km	MPC · JPL
368556	2003 YT_{163}	—	December 17, 2003	Kitt Peak	Spacewatch	·	920 m	MPC · JPL
368557	2004 BX_{19}	—	January 18, 2004	Kitt Peak	Spacewatch	EOS	2.6 km	MPC · JPL
368558	2004 BC_{22}	—	January 16, 2004	Palomar	NEAT	H	760 m	MPC · JPL
368559	2004 BN_{36}	—	January 19, 2004	Kitt Peak	Spacewatch	·	3.5 km	MPC · JPL
368560	2004 BF_{57}	—	January 23, 2004	Socorro	LINEAR	·	1.2 km	MPC · JPL
368561	2004 BM_{83}	—	January 28, 2004	Socorro	LINEAR	H	770 m	MPC · JPL
368562	2004 BZ_{85}	—	January 29, 2004	Socorro	LINEAR	H	670 m	MPC · JPL
368563	2004 CU_{1}	—	February 11, 2004	Palomar	NEAT	H	630 m	MPC · JPL
368564	2004 CB_{84}	—	February 12, 2004	Kitt Peak	Spacewatch	MAS	780 m	MPC · JPL
368565	2004 FE_{5}	—	March 22, 2004	Socorro	LINEAR	APO · PHA	350 m	MPC · JPL
368566	2004 GM_{9}	—	April 12, 2004	Kitt Peak	Spacewatch	·	1 km	MPC · JPL
368567	2004 GO_{44}	—	April 12, 2004	Kitt Peak	Spacewatch	·	1.6 km	MPC · JPL
368568	2004 GY_{46}	—	April 12, 2004	Kitt Peak	Spacewatch	·	1.1 km	MPC · JPL
368569	2004 JP_{20}	—	May 9, 2004	Kitt Peak	Spacewatch	H	670 m	MPC · JPL
368570	2004 JN_{44}	—	May 15, 2004	Socorro	LINEAR	·	2.3 km	MPC · JPL
368571	2004 KK	—	May 16, 2004	Socorro	LINEAR	·	2.0 km	MPC · JPL
368572	2004 LN_{8}	—	June 12, 2004	Socorro	LINEAR	·	2.0 km	MPC · JPL
368573	2004 NO_{24}	—	July 15, 2004	Socorro	LINEAR	JUN	1.4 km	MPC · JPL
368574	2004 PN_{1}	—	August 7, 2004	Palomar	NEAT	·	3.0 km	MPC · JPL
368575	2004 PC_{3}	—	August 3, 2004	Siding Spring	SSS	·	2.7 km	MPC · JPL
368576	2004 PE_{35}	—	August 8, 2004	Anderson Mesa	LONEOS	JUN	1.3 km	MPC · JPL
368577	2004 PZ_{42}	—	August 7, 2004	Palomar	NEAT	CLO	2.3 km	MPC · JPL
368578	2004 PH_{56}	—	August 9, 2004	Campo Imperatore	CINEOS	·	2.9 km	MPC · JPL
368579	2004 PX_{67}	—	August 6, 2004	Palomar	NEAT	·	2.0 km	MPC · JPL
368580	2004 PC_{70}	—	August 7, 2004	Palomar	NEAT	·	2.5 km	MPC · JPL
368581	2004 PE_{92}	—	August 12, 2004	Palomar	NEAT	·	2.3 km	MPC · JPL
368582	2004 PD_{105}	—	August 15, 2004	Kleť	Kleť	·	2.8 km	MPC · JPL
368583	2004 QX_{4}	—	August 21, 2004	Goodricke-Pigott	R. A. Tucker	EUN	1.2 km	MPC · JPL
368584	2004 QZ_{7}	—	August 16, 2004	Siding Spring	SSS	·	1.9 km	MPC · JPL
368585	2004 QV_{20}	—	August 20, 2004	Kitt Peak	Spacewatch	·	2.4 km	MPC · JPL
368586	2004 RG_{22}	—	September 7, 2004	Kitt Peak	Spacewatch	AEO	1.2 km	MPC · JPL
368587	2004 RA_{23}	—	September 7, 2004	Kitt Peak	Spacewatch	GEF	1.6 km	MPC · JPL
368588 Lazrek	2004 RP_{24}	Lazrek	September 8, 2004	Vicques	M. Ory	·	3.5 km	MPC · JPL
368589	2004 RD_{29}	—	September 7, 2004	Socorro	LINEAR	·	3.2 km	MPC · JPL
368590	2004 RN_{43}	—	September 8, 2004	Socorro	LINEAR	·	3.6 km	MPC · JPL
368591	2004 RQ_{43}	—	September 8, 2004	Socorro	LINEAR	GEF	1.7 km	MPC · JPL
368592	2004 RO_{66}	—	September 8, 2004	Socorro	LINEAR	·	2.8 km	MPC · JPL
368593	2004 RO_{67}	—	September 8, 2004	Socorro	LINEAR	·	1.9 km	MPC · JPL
368594	2004 RJ_{81}	—	September 8, 2004	Socorro	LINEAR	·	2.2 km	MPC · JPL
368595	2004 RP_{88}	—	September 8, 2004	Socorro	LINEAR	CLO	2.1 km	MPC · JPL
368596	2004 RG_{101}	—	September 8, 2004	Socorro	LINEAR	·	2.7 km	MPC · JPL
368597	2004 RM_{104}	—	September 8, 2004	Palomar	NEAT	·	2.4 km	MPC · JPL
368598	2004 RE_{105}	—	September 8, 2004	Palomar	NEAT	·	3.0 km	MPC · JPL
368599	2004 RA_{160}	—	September 10, 2004	Socorro	LINEAR	·	2.7 km	MPC · JPL
368600	2004 RR_{187}	—	September 10, 2004	Socorro	LINEAR	DOR	2.7 km	MPC · JPL

== 368601–368700 ==
back to top

Designation			Discovery			Properties		Ref
Permanent	Provisional	Named after	Date	Site	Discoverer(s)	Category	Diam.	Ref
368601	2004 RY_{195}	—	September 10, 2004	Socorro	LINEAR	·	2.6 km	MPC · JPL
368602	2004 RV_{196}	—	September 10, 2004	Socorro	LINEAR	·	2.4 km	MPC · JPL
368603	2004 RR_{206}	—	September 11, 2004	Socorro	LINEAR	·	2.2 km	MPC · JPL
368604	2004 RD_{210}	—	September 11, 2004	Socorro	LINEAR	·	3.0 km	MPC · JPL
368605	2004 RA_{212}	—	September 11, 2004	Socorro	LINEAR	·	3.3 km	MPC · JPL
368606	2004 RJ_{212}	—	September 11, 2004	Socorro	LINEAR	·	2.1 km	MPC · JPL
368607	2004 RJ_{215}	—	September 11, 2004	Socorro	LINEAR	·	2.8 km	MPC · JPL
368608	2004 RQ_{217}	—	September 11, 2004	Socorro	LINEAR	·	3.5 km	MPC · JPL
368609	2004 RT_{222}	—	September 6, 2004	Socorro	LINEAR	·	2.8 km	MPC · JPL
368610	2004 RG_{239}	—	September 10, 2004	Kitt Peak	Spacewatch	·	2.0 km	MPC · JPL
368611	2004 RY_{252}	—	September 15, 2004	Socorro	LINEAR	·	3.9 km	MPC · JPL
368612	2004 RF_{258}	—	September 10, 2004	Kitt Peak	Spacewatch	GEF	1.2 km	MPC · JPL
368613	2004 RD_{309}	—	September 13, 2004	Kitt Peak	Spacewatch	DOR	2.9 km	MPC · JPL
368614	2004 RZ_{321}	—	September 13, 2004	Socorro	LINEAR	·	2.6 km	MPC · JPL
368615	2004 SP_{4}	—	September 17, 2004	Kitt Peak	Spacewatch	·	1.8 km	MPC · JPL
368616	2004 SJ_{5}	—	September 19, 2004	CBA-East	Skillman, D. R.	·	2.3 km	MPC · JPL
368617 Sebastiánotero	2004 TM_{10}	Sebastiánotero	October 5, 2004	Sonoita	W. R. Cooney Jr., Gross, J.	·	2.4 km	MPC · JPL
368618	2004 TV_{19}	—	October 14, 2004	Goodricke-Pigott	R. A. Tucker	·	2.3 km	MPC · JPL
368619	2004 TR_{21}	—	October 4, 2004	Kitt Peak	Spacewatch	·	2.3 km	MPC · JPL
368620	2004 TG_{58}	—	October 5, 2004	Kitt Peak	Spacewatch	AGN	1.2 km	MPC · JPL
368621	2004 TD_{70}	—	October 5, 2004	Palomar	NEAT	·	2.3 km	MPC · JPL
368622	2004 TO_{188}	—	October 7, 2004	Kitt Peak	Spacewatch	KOR	1.3 km	MPC · JPL
368623	2004 TF_{195}	—	October 7, 2004	Kitt Peak	Spacewatch	·	2.5 km	MPC · JPL
368624	2004 TW_{210}	—	October 8, 2004	Kitt Peak	Spacewatch	HOF	3.1 km	MPC · JPL
368625	2004 TC_{216}	—	October 12, 2004	Moletai	Molėtai	·	3.3 km	MPC · JPL
368626	2004 TL_{228}	—	October 8, 2004	Kitt Peak	Spacewatch	·	2.0 km	MPC · JPL
368627	2004 TS_{355}	—	September 8, 2004	Socorro	LINEAR	·	2.7 km	MPC · JPL
368628	2004 UJ_{10}	—	October 20, 2004	Bakırtepe	I. Bikmaev, I. Khamitov	HOF	3.0 km	MPC · JPL
368629	2004 VH_{5}	—	November 3, 2004	Anderson Mesa	LONEOS	DOR	3.0 km	MPC · JPL
368630	2004 VC_{24}	—	September 22, 2004	Socorro	LINEAR	GEF	1.7 km	MPC · JPL
368631	2004 VN_{74}	—	November 12, 2004	Catalina	CSS	·	2.6 km	MPC · JPL
368632	2004 XM_{18}	—	November 7, 2004	Socorro	LINEAR	·	2.1 km	MPC · JPL
368633	2004 XB_{41}	—	December 11, 2004	Kitt Peak	Spacewatch	·	2.6 km	MPC · JPL
368634	2004 XF_{107}	—	December 11, 2004	Catalina	CSS	GEF	1.9 km	MPC · JPL
368635	2004 XK_{145}	—	December 13, 2004	Kitt Peak	Spacewatch	·	3.6 km	MPC · JPL
368636	2004 YU_{14}	—	December 18, 2004	Mount Lemmon	Mount Lemmon Survey	·	1.8 km	MPC · JPL
368637	2004 YE_{20}	—	December 18, 2004	Mount Lemmon	Mount Lemmon Survey	EOS	2.1 km	MPC · JPL
368638	2004 YM_{20}	—	December 18, 2004	Mount Lemmon	Mount Lemmon Survey	·	2.9 km	MPC · JPL
368639	2005 AH_{59}	—	January 15, 2005	Socorro	LINEAR	EOS	2.8 km	MPC · JPL
368640	2005 CV_{1}	—	February 1, 2005	Catalina	CSS	·	3.9 km	MPC · JPL
368641	2005 CG_{10}	—	February 1, 2005	Kitt Peak	Spacewatch	·	990 m	MPC · JPL
368642	2005 CP_{18}	—	February 2, 2005	Catalina	CSS	·	4.9 km	MPC · JPL
368643	2005 CO_{44}	—	February 2, 2005	Kitt Peak	Spacewatch	(895)	6.9 km	MPC · JPL
368644	2005 CW_{78}	—	February 1, 2005	Kitt Peak	Spacewatch	·	3.6 km	MPC · JPL
368645	2005 CR_{80}	—	February 1, 2005	Catalina	CSS	·	3.7 km	MPC · JPL
368646	2005 ES_{12}	—	March 2, 2005	Catalina	CSS	·	920 m	MPC · JPL
368647	2005 EJ_{18}	—	February 9, 2005	Mount Lemmon	Mount Lemmon Survey	·	870 m	MPC · JPL
368648	2005 EV_{82}	—	March 4, 2005	Kitt Peak	Spacewatch	NYS	1.1 km	MPC · JPL
368649	2005 EK_{118}	—	March 7, 2005	Socorro	LINEAR	·	4.5 km	MPC · JPL
368650	2005 ET_{129}	—	March 9, 2005	Mount Lemmon	Mount Lemmon Survey	·	3.6 km	MPC · JPL
368651	2005 EH_{146}	—	March 10, 2005	Mount Lemmon	Mount Lemmon Survey	·	3.6 km	MPC · JPL
368652	2005 EX_{161}	—	March 9, 2005	Mount Lemmon	Mount Lemmon Survey	·	3.2 km	MPC · JPL
368653	2005 EN_{171}	—	March 4, 2005	Catalina	CSS	·	1.2 km	MPC · JPL
368654	2005 EK_{180}	—	March 9, 2005	Kitt Peak	Spacewatch	·	1.1 km	MPC · JPL
368655	2005 EV_{190}	—	March 11, 2005	Mount Lemmon	Mount Lemmon Survey	VER	3.8 km	MPC · JPL
368656	2005 ER_{203}	—	March 11, 2005	Kitt Peak	Spacewatch	·	720 m	MPC · JPL
368657	2005 EZ_{213}	—	March 7, 2005	Socorro	LINEAR	·	1.3 km	MPC · JPL
368658	2005 EJ_{223}	—	March 10, 2005	Kitt Peak	Spacewatch	·	1.4 km	MPC · JPL
368659	2005 EM_{324}	—	March 11, 2005	Mount Lemmon	Mount Lemmon Survey	·	1.1 km	MPC · JPL
368660	2005 GK_{18}	—	April 2, 2005	Kitt Peak	Spacewatch	·	1.2 km	MPC · JPL
368661	2005 GO_{31}	—	March 10, 2005	Catalina	CSS	·	1.2 km	MPC · JPL
368662	2005 GX_{81}	—	March 3, 2005	Catalina	CSS	·	880 m	MPC · JPL
368663	2005 GR_{110}	—	April 10, 2005	Mount Lemmon	Mount Lemmon Survey	MAS	810 m	MPC · JPL
368664	2005 JA_{22}	—	May 6, 2005	Kitt Peak	Spacewatch	AMO	650 m	MPC · JPL
368665	2005 JW_{84}	—	May 8, 2005	Catalina	CSS	·	1.6 km	MPC · JPL
368666	2005 JN_{96}	—	May 8, 2005	Mount Lemmon	Mount Lemmon Survey	·	1.3 km	MPC · JPL
368667	2005 JD_{106}	—	May 11, 2005	Mount Lemmon	Mount Lemmon Survey	NYS	1.4 km	MPC · JPL
368668	2005 JF_{164}	—	April 11, 2005	Kitt Peak	Spacewatch	NYS	1.0 km	MPC · JPL
368669	2005 LL_{23}	—	June 8, 2005	Kitt Peak	Spacewatch	·	1.5 km	MPC · JPL
368670	2005 NU	—	July 2, 2005	Kitt Peak	Spacewatch	3:2	6.1 km	MPC · JPL
368671	2005 NX_{35}	—	July 5, 2005	Palomar	NEAT	PHO	1.1 km	MPC · JPL
368672	2005 OZ_{13}	—	July 30, 2005	Palomar	NEAT	H	490 m	MPC · JPL
368673	2005 QJ_{13}	—	August 24, 2005	Palomar	NEAT	·	1.1 km	MPC · JPL
368674	2005 QF_{22}	—	August 27, 2005	Anderson Mesa	LONEOS	·	900 m	MPC · JPL
368675	2005 QX_{22}	—	August 27, 2005	Kitt Peak	Spacewatch	·	1.2 km	MPC · JPL
368676	2005 QQ_{29}	—	August 26, 2005	Palomar	NEAT	·	1.5 km	MPC · JPL
368677	2005 QB_{68}	—	August 28, 2005	Siding Spring	SSS	3:2	6.4 km	MPC · JPL
368678	2005 QN_{81}	—	August 29, 2005	Kitt Peak	Spacewatch	·	800 m	MPC · JPL
368679	2005 QC_{90}	—	August 25, 2005	Palomar	NEAT	·	660 m	MPC · JPL
368680	2005 QZ_{155}	—	August 30, 2005	Palomar	NEAT	MAR	1.2 km	MPC · JPL
368681	2005 QW_{188}	—	August 31, 2005	Kitt Peak	Spacewatch	·	1.3 km	MPC · JPL
368682	2005 RY_{1}	—	September 1, 2005	Palomar	NEAT	MAR	1.3 km	MPC · JPL
368683	2005 RB_{5}	—	September 6, 2005	Uccle	T. Pauwels	·	2.0 km	MPC · JPL
368684	2005 RB_{6}	—	September 6, 2005	Anderson Mesa	LONEOS	T_{j} (2.99) · HIL · 3:2	7.2 km	MPC · JPL
368685	2005 RK_{20}	—	September 1, 2005	Palomar	NEAT	EUN	1.1 km	MPC · JPL
368686	2005 SD_{14}	—	September 24, 2005	Kitt Peak	Spacewatch	·	1.0 km	MPC · JPL
368687	2005 SN_{16}	—	September 26, 2005	Kitt Peak	Spacewatch	·	1.2 km	MPC · JPL
368688	2005 SA_{34}	—	September 23, 2005	Kitt Peak	Spacewatch	·	1.1 km	MPC · JPL
368689	2005 SN_{42}	—	September 24, 2005	Kitt Peak	Spacewatch	·	1.1 km	MPC · JPL
368690	2005 SC_{43}	—	January 6, 1998	Kitt Peak	Spacewatch	·	1.2 km	MPC · JPL
368691	2005 SW_{57}	—	September 26, 2005	Kitt Peak	Spacewatch	·	1.5 km	MPC · JPL
368692	2005 SF_{75}	—	September 24, 2005	Kitt Peak	Spacewatch	·	870 m	MPC · JPL
368693	2005 SY_{77}	—	September 24, 2005	Kitt Peak	Spacewatch	·	1.1 km	MPC · JPL
368694	2005 SG_{91}	—	September 24, 2005	Kitt Peak	Spacewatch	·	1.4 km	MPC · JPL
368695	2005 SN_{91}	—	September 24, 2005	Kitt Peak	Spacewatch	(5)	960 m	MPC · JPL
368696	2005 SA_{115}	—	September 27, 2005	Kitt Peak	Spacewatch	·	1.4 km	MPC · JPL
368697	2005 SQ_{116}	—	September 27, 2005	Socorro	LINEAR	·	2.1 km	MPC · JPL
368698	2005 SU_{153}	—	September 26, 2005	Kitt Peak	Spacewatch	(5)	830 m	MPC · JPL
368699	2005 SR_{155}	—	September 26, 2005	Palomar	NEAT	EUN	1.3 km	MPC · JPL
368700	2005 SR_{160}	—	September 27, 2005	Kitt Peak	Spacewatch	·	1.6 km	MPC · JPL

== 368701–368800 ==
back to top

Designation			Discovery			Properties		Ref
Permanent	Provisional	Named after	Date	Site	Discoverer(s)	Category	Diam.	Ref
368701	2005 SZ_{171}	—	September 29, 2005	Kitt Peak	Spacewatch	·	2.2 km	MPC · JPL
368702	2005 SA_{200}	—	September 30, 2005	Kitt Peak	Spacewatch	·	1.3 km	MPC · JPL
368703	2005 SC_{223}	—	September 28, 2005	Cordell-Lorenz	D. T. Durig	·	1.4 km	MPC · JPL
368704 Roelgathier	2005 SD_{223}	Roelgathier	September 21, 2005	Uccle	T. Pauwels	·	1.3 km	MPC · JPL
368705	2005 SQ_{241}	—	September 30, 2005	Kitt Peak	Spacewatch	·	1.5 km	MPC · JPL
368706	2005 SR_{241}	—	September 30, 2005	Kitt Peak	Spacewatch	(5)	950 m	MPC · JPL
368707	2005 SQ_{265}	—	September 27, 2005	Kitt Peak	Spacewatch	·	600 m	MPC · JPL
368708	2005 SD_{281}	—	September 30, 2005	Catalina	CSS	·	1.1 km	MPC · JPL
368709	2005 SN_{293}	—	September 25, 2005	Kitt Peak	Spacewatch	·	1.4 km	MPC · JPL
368710	2005 TK_{17}	—	October 1, 2005	Mount Lemmon	Mount Lemmon Survey	·	910 m	MPC · JPL
368711	2005 TY_{25}	—	October 1, 2005	Mount Lemmon	Mount Lemmon Survey	·	1.2 km	MPC · JPL
368712	2005 TN_{39}	—	October 1, 2005	Catalina	CSS	·	1.3 km	MPC · JPL
368713	2005 TZ_{101}	—	October 7, 2005	Mount Lemmon	Mount Lemmon Survey	·	1.3 km	MPC · JPL
368714	2005 TO_{106}	—	October 4, 2005	Palomar	NEAT	·	2.2 km	MPC · JPL
368715	2005 TP_{128}	—	October 7, 2005	Kitt Peak	Spacewatch	·	1.1 km	MPC · JPL
368716	2005 TX_{153}	—	October 7, 2005	Mount Lemmon	Mount Lemmon Survey	·	1.2 km	MPC · JPL
368717	2005 TU_{159}	—	October 9, 2005	Kitt Peak	Spacewatch	ADE	2.7 km	MPC · JPL
368718	2005 TH_{163}	—	October 9, 2005	Kitt Peak	Spacewatch	·	1.6 km	MPC · JPL
368719 Asparuh	2005 UT_{12}	Asparuh	October 25, 2005	Plana	Fratev, F.	·	2.0 km	MPC · JPL
368720	2005 UF_{16}	—	October 22, 2005	Kitt Peak	Spacewatch	·	900 m	MPC · JPL
368721	2005 UK_{29}	—	October 23, 2005	Catalina	CSS	(5)	1.4 km	MPC · JPL
368722	2005 UX_{44}	—	October 22, 2005	Goodricke-Pigott	R. A. Tucker	·	1.2 km	MPC · JPL
368723	2005 UY_{50}	—	October 23, 2005	Catalina	CSS	(5)	1.2 km	MPC · JPL
368724	2005 UZ_{50}	—	October 23, 2005	Catalina	CSS	·	1.6 km	MPC · JPL
368725	2005 UN_{56}	—	October 24, 2005	Anderson Mesa	LONEOS	H	720 m	MPC · JPL
368726	2005 UO_{60}	—	October 25, 2005	Mount Lemmon	Mount Lemmon Survey	·	1.7 km	MPC · JPL
368727	2005 UR_{70}	—	October 23, 2005	Catalina	CSS	(5)	1.4 km	MPC · JPL
368728	2005 UG_{77}	—	October 24, 2005	Kitt Peak	Spacewatch	·	970 m	MPC · JPL
368729	2005 UN_{98}	—	October 22, 2005	Kitt Peak	Spacewatch	·	1.8 km	MPC · JPL
368730	2005 UD_{110}	—	October 22, 2005	Kitt Peak	Spacewatch	(5)	1.2 km	MPC · JPL
368731	2005 UM_{110}	—	October 22, 2005	Kitt Peak	Spacewatch	·	1.7 km	MPC · JPL
368732	2005 UY_{167}	—	October 24, 2005	Kitt Peak	Spacewatch	·	1.0 km	MPC · JPL
368733	2005 UK_{171}	—	October 24, 2005	Kitt Peak	Spacewatch	ADE	2.2 km	MPC · JPL
368734	2005 UA_{202}	—	October 25, 2005	Kitt Peak	Spacewatch	·	1.8 km	MPC · JPL
368735	2005 UL_{217}	—	October 27, 2005	Mount Lemmon	Mount Lemmon Survey	JUN	1.5 km	MPC · JPL
368736	2005 UP_{229}	—	October 25, 2005	Kitt Peak	Spacewatch	(7744)	1.3 km	MPC · JPL
368737	2005 UA_{268}	—	October 27, 2005	Mount Lemmon	Mount Lemmon Survey	·	2.1 km	MPC · JPL
368738	2005 UQ_{274}	—	October 27, 2005	Catalina	CSS	BRG	1.4 km	MPC · JPL
368739	2005 UD_{289}	—	October 26, 2005	Kitt Peak	Spacewatch	·	1.4 km	MPC · JPL
368740	2005 UN_{302}	—	October 26, 2005	Kitt Peak	Spacewatch	·	2.3 km	MPC · JPL
368741	2005 UD_{307}	—	October 27, 2005	Mount Lemmon	Mount Lemmon Survey	·	3.4 km	MPC · JPL
368742	2005 UU_{342}	—	October 3, 2005	Palomar	NEAT	EUN	1.2 km	MPC · JPL
368743	2005 UP_{346}	—	October 30, 2005	Kitt Peak	Spacewatch	·	2.0 km	MPC · JPL
368744	2005 UM_{377}	—	September 29, 2005	Kitt Peak	Spacewatch	MAR	1.2 km	MPC · JPL
368745	2005 US_{407}	—	October 30, 2005	Kitt Peak	Spacewatch	·	1.0 km	MPC · JPL
368746	2005 UB_{416}	—	October 25, 2005	Kitt Peak	Spacewatch	NEM	2.1 km	MPC · JPL
368747	2005 UC_{421}	—	October 26, 2005	Kitt Peak	Spacewatch	·	1.3 km	MPC · JPL
368748	2005 UJ_{446}	—	October 29, 2005	Catalina	CSS	·	1.7 km	MPC · JPL
368749	2005 UF_{452}	—	October 28, 2005	Mount Lemmon	Mount Lemmon Survey	BRA	2.2 km	MPC · JPL
368750	2005 UZ_{454}	—	October 28, 2005	Catalina	CSS	(5)	1.3 km	MPC · JPL
368751	2005 UG_{456}	—	October 29, 2005	Kitt Peak	Spacewatch	(5)	1.6 km	MPC · JPL
368752	2005 UB_{481}	—	October 25, 2005	Socorro	LINEAR	·	1.8 km	MPC · JPL
368753	2005 UY_{487}	—	October 23, 2005	Catalina	CSS	·	1.4 km	MPC · JPL
368754	2005 UX_{509}	—	October 23, 2005	Catalina	CSS	·	1.5 km	MPC · JPL
368755	2005 UF_{514}	—	October 20, 2005	Apache Point	A. C. Becker	·	870 m	MPC · JPL
368756	2005 UM_{522}	—	October 27, 2005	Apache Point	A. C. Becker	·	1.4 km	MPC · JPL
368757	2005 VW_{2}	—	November 3, 2005	Catalina	CSS	·	1.5 km	MPC · JPL
368758	2005 VK_{6}	—	November 6, 2005	Kitt Peak	Spacewatch	·	2.2 km	MPC · JPL
368759	2005 VF_{49}	—	November 1, 2005	Anderson Mesa	LONEOS	·	1.8 km	MPC · JPL
368760	2005 VB_{66}	—	October 29, 2005	Mount Lemmon	Mount Lemmon Survey	(17392)	1.6 km	MPC · JPL
368761	2005 VB_{74}	—	November 1, 2005	Mount Lemmon	Mount Lemmon Survey	(5)	1.4 km	MPC · JPL
368762	2005 VW_{75}	—	November 2, 2005	Mount Lemmon	Mount Lemmon Survey	·	1.6 km	MPC · JPL
368763	2005 VP_{87}	—	November 6, 2005	Kitt Peak	Spacewatch	·	1.4 km	MPC · JPL
368764	2005 VC_{101}	—	November 1, 2005	Kitt Peak	Spacewatch	·	1.6 km	MPC · JPL
368765	2005 VV_{111}	—	November 6, 2005	Mount Lemmon	Mount Lemmon Survey	·	2.1 km	MPC · JPL
368766	2005 VC_{120}	—	November 6, 2005	Mount Lemmon	Mount Lemmon Survey	·	2.6 km	MPC · JPL
368767	2005 VX_{135}	—	November 12, 2005	Kitt Peak	Spacewatch	·	1.6 km	MPC · JPL
368768	2005 WA_{3}	—	November 20, 2005	Palomar	NEAT	·	1.6 km	MPC · JPL
368769	2005 WZ_{9}	—	November 21, 2005	Kitt Peak	Spacewatch	EUN	1.6 km	MPC · JPL
368770	2005 WS_{14}	—	November 22, 2005	Kitt Peak	Spacewatch	·	1.3 km	MPC · JPL
368771	2005 WC_{19}	—	November 22, 2005	Junk Bond	D. Healy	·	3.3 km	MPC · JPL
368772	2005 WW_{26}	—	November 21, 2005	Kitt Peak	Spacewatch	·	1.6 km	MPC · JPL
368773	2005 WZ_{29}	—	November 21, 2005	Kitt Peak	Spacewatch	·	1.2 km	MPC · JPL
368774	2005 WZ_{48}	—	November 25, 2005	Kitt Peak	Spacewatch	·	2.1 km	MPC · JPL
368775	2005 WF_{68}	—	November 22, 2005	Kitt Peak	Spacewatch	·	2.9 km	MPC · JPL
368776	2005 WT_{82}	—	November 25, 2005	Mount Lemmon	Mount Lemmon Survey	·	980 m	MPC · JPL
368777	2005 WJ_{105}	—	November 29, 2005	Catalina	CSS	·	1.6 km	MPC · JPL
368778	2005 WG_{113}	—	November 25, 2005	Catalina	CSS	·	1.1 km	MPC · JPL
368779	2005 WB_{121}	—	November 30, 2005	Socorro	LINEAR	·	1.7 km	MPC · JPL
368780	2005 WH_{149}	—	November 28, 2005	Kitt Peak	Spacewatch	EUN	1.5 km	MPC · JPL
368781	2005 WG_{157}	—	November 25, 2005	Catalina	CSS	·	2.0 km	MPC · JPL
368782	2005 WM_{166}	—	November 29, 2005	Mount Lemmon	Mount Lemmon Survey	·	2.3 km	MPC · JPL
368783	2005 WR_{174}	—	November 30, 2005	Kitt Peak	Spacewatch	·	3.0 km	MPC · JPL
368784	2005 WV_{179}	—	November 21, 2005	Catalina	CSS	·	2.1 km	MPC · JPL
368785	2005 WG_{189}	—	November 30, 2005	Socorro	LINEAR	·	3.6 km	MPC · JPL
368786	2005 WK_{196}	—	November 30, 2005	Mount Lemmon	Mount Lemmon Survey	EUN	1.7 km	MPC · JPL
368787	2005 XO_{2}	—	December 1, 2005	Kitt Peak	Spacewatch	(5)	1.2 km	MPC · JPL
368788	2005 XM_{3}	—	December 1, 2005	Socorro	LINEAR	·	2.3 km	MPC · JPL
368789	2005 XF_{8}	—	December 7, 2005	Mayhill	Lowe, A.	·	1.2 km	MPC · JPL
368790	2005 XK_{8}	—	December 7, 2005	Catalina	CSS	AMO	380 m	MPC · JPL
368791	2005 XC_{40}	—	December 5, 2005	Mount Lemmon	Mount Lemmon Survey	·	2.1 km	MPC · JPL
368792	2005 XZ_{49}	—	December 2, 2005	Kitt Peak	Spacewatch	·	2.4 km	MPC · JPL
368793	2005 XL_{51}	—	December 2, 2005	Kitt Peak	Spacewatch	NEM	2.3 km	MPC · JPL
368794	2005 XW_{53}	—	December 4, 2005	Kitt Peak	Spacewatch	·	1.8 km	MPC · JPL
368795	2005 XJ_{78}	—	December 1, 2005	Catalina	CSS	·	1.9 km	MPC · JPL
368796	2005 XB_{80}	—	December 2, 2005	Catalina	CSS	EUN	1.7 km	MPC · JPL
368797	2005 YR_{17}	—	December 23, 2005	Kitt Peak	Spacewatch	·	2.0 km	MPC · JPL
368798	2005 YT_{36}	—	December 25, 2005	Kitt Peak	Spacewatch	·	2.4 km	MPC · JPL
368799	2005 YP_{37}	—	December 21, 2005	Catalina	CSS	·	1.3 km	MPC · JPL
368800	2005 YU_{41}	—	December 22, 2005	Kitt Peak	Spacewatch	·	2.6 km	MPC · JPL

== 368801–368900 ==
back to top

Designation			Discovery			Properties		Ref
Permanent	Provisional	Named after	Date	Site	Discoverer(s)	Category	Diam.	Ref
368801	2005 YT_{62}	—	December 24, 2005	Kitt Peak	Spacewatch	AGN	970 m	MPC · JPL
368802	2005 YN_{71}	—	December 6, 2005	Kitt Peak	Spacewatch	PAD	1.9 km	MPC · JPL
368803	2005 YJ_{73}	—	December 24, 2005	Kitt Peak	Spacewatch	·	1.4 km	MPC · JPL
368804	2005 YC_{89}	—	December 26, 2005	Kitt Peak	Spacewatch	WIT	980 m	MPC · JPL
368805	2005 YV_{96}	—	December 23, 2005	Catalina	CSS	·	2.2 km	MPC · JPL
368806	2005 YY_{98}	—	December 28, 2005	Palomar	NEAT	·	4.5 km	MPC · JPL
368807	2005 YK_{117}	—	December 25, 2005	Kitt Peak	Spacewatch	·	2.4 km	MPC · JPL
368808	2005 YR_{118}	—	December 26, 2005	Kitt Peak	Spacewatch	AGN	1.2 km	MPC · JPL
368809	2005 YP_{134}	—	December 26, 2005	Kitt Peak	Spacewatch	·	3.1 km	MPC · JPL
368810	2005 YE_{181}	—	December 22, 2005	Catalina	CSS	·	1.6 km	MPC · JPL
368811	2005 YK_{186}	—	December 29, 2005	Catalina	CSS	H	780 m	MPC · JPL
368812	2006 AA_{11}	—	January 4, 2006	Catalina	CSS	·	2.6 km	MPC · JPL
368813	2006 AM_{20}	—	January 5, 2006	Catalina	CSS	(5)	1.6 km	MPC · JPL
368814	2006 AZ_{65}	—	January 8, 2006	Mount Lemmon	Mount Lemmon Survey	·	2.2 km	MPC · JPL
368815	2006 AF_{79}	—	January 6, 2006	Kitt Peak	Spacewatch	HOF	2.7 km	MPC · JPL
368816	2006 AP_{92}	—	January 7, 2006	Mount Lemmon	Mount Lemmon Survey	·	2.6 km	MPC · JPL
368817	2006 AP_{104}	—	January 5, 2006	Mount Lemmon	Mount Lemmon Survey	MRX	1.2 km	MPC · JPL
368818	2006 BK_{12}	—	January 21, 2006	Palomar	NEAT	·	2.3 km	MPC · JPL
368819	2006 BG_{19}	—	December 28, 2005	Kitt Peak	Spacewatch	AEO	1.1 km	MPC · JPL
368820	2006 BH_{44}	—	January 23, 2006	Kitt Peak	Spacewatch	·	3.8 km	MPC · JPL
368821	2006 BW_{52}	—	January 25, 2006	Kitt Peak	Spacewatch	·	3.4 km	MPC · JPL
368822	2006 BS_{94}	—	January 8, 2006	Mount Lemmon	Mount Lemmon Survey	EUP	3.3 km	MPC · JPL
368823	2006 BD_{108}	—	January 25, 2006	Kitt Peak	Spacewatch	·	2.0 km	MPC · JPL
368824	2006 BS_{147}	—	January 31, 2006	Catalina	CSS	·	3.4 km	MPC · JPL
368825	2006 BD_{211}	—	January 31, 2006	Kitt Peak	Spacewatch	·	2.4 km	MPC · JPL
368826	2006 BC_{236}	—	January 23, 2006	Kitt Peak	Spacewatch	EOS	2.3 km	MPC · JPL
368827	2006 CD_{11}	—	February 1, 2006	Kitt Peak	Spacewatch	·	690 m	MPC · JPL
368828	2006 CT_{17}	—	January 23, 2006	Kitt Peak	Spacewatch	THB	3.3 km	MPC · JPL
368829	2006 CT_{22}	—	February 1, 2006	Mount Lemmon	Mount Lemmon Survey	·	2.0 km	MPC · JPL
368830	2006 CC_{36}	—	February 2, 2006	Mount Lemmon	Mount Lemmon Survey	·	4.8 km	MPC · JPL
368831	2006 CD_{53}	—	February 4, 2006	Kitt Peak	Spacewatch	·	2.7 km	MPC · JPL
368832	2006 CH_{65}	—	February 1, 2006	Mount Lemmon	Mount Lemmon Survey	·	2.2 km	MPC · JPL
368833	2006 DB_{13}	—	February 22, 2006	Catalina	CSS	·	4.0 km	MPC · JPL
368834	2006 DQ_{21}	—	January 26, 2006	Mount Lemmon	Mount Lemmon Survey	BRA	1.8 km	MPC · JPL
368835	2006 DM_{30}	—	February 20, 2006	Kitt Peak	Spacewatch	·	2.3 km	MPC · JPL
368836	2006 DC_{61}	—	February 24, 2006	Kitt Peak	Spacewatch	·	2.9 km	MPC · JPL
368837	2006 DZ_{71}	—	February 21, 2006	Mount Lemmon	Mount Lemmon Survey	·	2.5 km	MPC · JPL
368838	2006 DQ_{90}	—	February 24, 2006	Kitt Peak	Spacewatch	·	3.4 km	MPC · JPL
368839	2006 DP_{111}	—	February 27, 2006	Mount Lemmon	Mount Lemmon Survey	·	2.8 km	MPC · JPL
368840	2006 DP_{134}	—	February 25, 2006	Kitt Peak	Spacewatch	NAE	3.5 km	MPC · JPL
368841	2006 DZ_{151}	—	February 25, 2006	Kitt Peak	Spacewatch	·	2.1 km	MPC · JPL
368842	2006 DJ_{200}	—	February 24, 2006	Palomar	NEAT	·	3.9 km	MPC · JPL
368843	2006 EB_{8}	—	February 20, 2006	Kitt Peak	Spacewatch	·	1.9 km	MPC · JPL
368844	2006 EP_{12}	—	March 2, 2006	Kitt Peak	Spacewatch	·	1.6 km	MPC · JPL
368845	2006 EM_{16}	—	March 2, 2006	Kitt Peak	Spacewatch	·	2.6 km	MPC · JPL
368846	2006 EM_{19}	—	March 2, 2006	Kitt Peak	Spacewatch	EOS	2.4 km	MPC · JPL
368847	2006 EW_{55}	—	March 5, 2006	Kitt Peak	Spacewatch	·	2.3 km	MPC · JPL
368848	2006 EF_{60}	—	March 5, 2006	Kitt Peak	Spacewatch	·	2.6 km	MPC · JPL
368849	2006 EQ_{63}	—	March 5, 2006	Kitt Peak	Spacewatch	·	3.0 km	MPC · JPL
368850	2006 FN_{18}	—	March 23, 2006	Kitt Peak	Spacewatch	·	2.4 km	MPC · JPL
368851	2006 FN_{21}	—	March 24, 2006	Mount Lemmon	Mount Lemmon Survey	·	1.6 km	MPC · JPL
368852	2006 GG_{19}	—	April 2, 2006	Kitt Peak	Spacewatch	·	1.5 km	MPC · JPL
368853	2006 HU_{75}	—	April 25, 2006	Kitt Peak	Spacewatch	·	3.2 km	MPC · JPL
368854	2006 HP_{94}	—	April 30, 2006	Kitt Peak	Spacewatch	·	520 m	MPC · JPL
368855	2006 HG_{102}	—	April 30, 2006	Kitt Peak	Spacewatch	·	740 m	MPC · JPL
368856	2006 HG_{119}	—	April 30, 2006	Kitt Peak	Spacewatch	·	820 m	MPC · JPL
368857	2006 HH_{134}	—	April 26, 2006	Cerro Tololo	M. W. Buie	·	3.2 km	MPC · JPL
368858	2006 JB_{2}	—	May 1, 2006	Socorro	LINEAR	·	830 m	MPC · JPL
368859	2006 JX_{39}	—	May 6, 2006	Mount Lemmon	Mount Lemmon Survey	THM	2.6 km	MPC · JPL
368860	2006 JO_{49}	—	May 1, 2006	Kitt Peak	Spacewatch	·	620 m	MPC · JPL
368861	2006 OL_{4}	—	July 21, 2006	Mount Lemmon	Mount Lemmon Survey	MAS	890 m	MPC · JPL
368862	2006 OL_{13}	—	July 21, 2006	Catalina	CSS	·	960 m	MPC · JPL
368863	2006 PC_{23}	—	August 12, 2006	Palomar	NEAT	·	950 m	MPC · JPL
368864	2006 PT_{31}	—	August 14, 2006	Siding Spring	SSS	·	860 m	MPC · JPL
368865	2006 PG_{34}	—	June 19, 2006	Mount Lemmon	Mount Lemmon Survey	·	810 m	MPC · JPL
368866	2006 QL_{25}	—	August 18, 2006	Kitt Peak	Spacewatch	·	1.4 km	MPC · JPL
368867	2006 QU_{48}	—	August 21, 2006	Palomar	NEAT	·	1.2 km	MPC · JPL
368868	2006 QD_{82}	—	August 24, 2006	Palomar	NEAT	·	1.4 km	MPC · JPL
368869	2006 QZ_{104}	—	August 28, 2006	Catalina	CSS	·	760 m	MPC · JPL
368870	2006 QC_{105}	—	August 28, 2006	Catalina	CSS	·	770 m	MPC · JPL
368871	2006 QB_{112}	—	August 22, 2006	Palomar	NEAT	·	730 m	MPC · JPL
368872	2006 QE_{128}	—	August 17, 2006	Palomar	NEAT	·	870 m	MPC · JPL
368873	2006 QN_{131}	—	August 22, 2006	Palomar	NEAT	·	860 m	MPC · JPL
368874	2006 QG_{161}	—	August 19, 2006	Kitt Peak	Spacewatch	·	890 m	MPC · JPL
368875	2006 QA_{185}	—	August 19, 2006	Kitt Peak	Spacewatch	·	1.1 km	MPC · JPL
368876	2006 RZ_{8}	—	August 27, 2006	Kitt Peak	Spacewatch	·	750 m	MPC · JPL
368877	2006 RL_{15}	—	September 14, 2006	Palomar	NEAT	NYS	1.0 km	MPC · JPL
368878	2006 RS_{18}	—	September 14, 2006	Palomar	NEAT	·	1.1 km	MPC · JPL
368879	2006 RU_{86}	—	September 15, 2006	Kitt Peak	Spacewatch	·	900 m	MPC · JPL
368880	2006 RC_{88}	—	September 15, 2006	Kitt Peak	Spacewatch	MAS	660 m	MPC · JPL
368881	2006 SL	—	September 17, 2006	Mayhill	Lowe, A.	·	1.3 km	MPC · JPL
368882	2006 SU_{20}	—	August 20, 2006	Palomar	NEAT	ERI	1.5 km	MPC · JPL
368883	2006 SO_{32}	—	September 17, 2006	Kitt Peak	Spacewatch	·	1.0 km	MPC · JPL
368884	2006 SL_{55}	—	September 18, 2006	Catalina	CSS	PHO	2.6 km	MPC · JPL
368885	2006 SM_{55}	—	September 18, 2006	Catalina	CSS	·	1.7 km	MPC · JPL
368886	2006 SY_{56}	—	September 20, 2006	Catalina	CSS	V	870 m	MPC · JPL
368887	2006 SL_{71}	—	September 19, 2006	Kitt Peak	Spacewatch	·	940 m	MPC · JPL
368888	2006 SH_{90}	—	September 18, 2006	Kitt Peak	Spacewatch	·	1.2 km	MPC · JPL
368889	2006 SF_{91}	—	September 18, 2006	Kitt Peak	Spacewatch	·	890 m	MPC · JPL
368890	2006 SY_{98}	—	September 18, 2006	Kitt Peak	Spacewatch	·	1.2 km	MPC · JPL
368891	2006 SS_{107}	—	September 19, 2006	Anderson Mesa	LONEOS	·	1.4 km	MPC · JPL
368892	2006 SU_{117}	—	September 15, 2006	Kitt Peak	Spacewatch	·	870 m	MPC · JPL
368893	2006 SY_{132}	—	September 16, 2006	Catalina	CSS	·	1.7 km	MPC · JPL
368894	2006 SY_{165}	—	September 25, 2006	Kitt Peak	Spacewatch	V	750 m	MPC · JPL
368895	2006 SN_{193}	—	September 26, 2006	Catalina	CSS	·	1.2 km	MPC · JPL
368896	2006 SN_{211}	—	September 26, 2006	Catalina	CSS	·	1.0 km	MPC · JPL
368897	2006 SX_{218}	—	September 26, 2006	Goodricke-Pigott	R. A. Tucker	·	1.2 km	MPC · JPL
368898	2006 SS_{253}	—	September 26, 2006	Mount Lemmon	Mount Lemmon Survey	·	960 m	MPC · JPL
368899	2006 SJ_{257}	—	September 26, 2006	Kitt Peak	Spacewatch	NYS	890 m	MPC · JPL
368900	2006 SL_{257}	—	September 26, 2006	Kitt Peak	Spacewatch	3:2	6.1 km	MPC · JPL

== 368901–369000 ==
back to top

Designation			Discovery			Properties		Ref
Permanent	Provisional	Named after	Date	Site	Discoverer(s)	Category	Diam.	Ref
368901	2006 SS_{327}	—	September 19, 2006	Kitt Peak	Spacewatch	T_{j} (2.99) · 3:2 · SHU	5.5 km	MPC · JPL
368902	2006 SU_{342}	—	September 28, 2006	Kitt Peak	Spacewatch	V	620 m	MPC · JPL
368903	2006 SW_{356}	—	September 30, 2006	Catalina	CSS	NYS	1.3 km	MPC · JPL
368904	2006 TT_{1}	—	September 17, 2006	Kitt Peak	Spacewatch	·	970 m	MPC · JPL
368905	2006 TY_{21}	—	October 11, 2006	Kitt Peak	Spacewatch	·	990 m	MPC · JPL
368906	2006 TE_{26}	—	October 12, 2006	Kitt Peak	Spacewatch	·	1.4 km	MPC · JPL
368907	2006 TM_{36}	—	August 20, 1995	Kitt Peak	Spacewatch	NYS	980 m	MPC · JPL
368908	2006 TB_{37}	—	October 12, 2006	Kitt Peak	Spacewatch	·	1.3 km	MPC · JPL
368909	2006 TA_{65}	—	October 11, 2006	Kitt Peak	Spacewatch	·	1.1 km	MPC · JPL
368910	2006 TG_{68}	—	October 11, 2006	Palomar	NEAT	·	1.0 km	MPC · JPL
368911	2006 TL_{79}	—	October 12, 2006	Palomar	NEAT	·	1.7 km	MPC · JPL
368912	2006 TR_{86}	—	October 13, 2006	Kitt Peak	Spacewatch	·	1.1 km	MPC · JPL
368913	2006 TG_{104}	—	October 15, 2006	Kitt Peak	Spacewatch	NYS	970 m	MPC · JPL
368914	2006 UA_{34}	—	October 16, 2006	Kitt Peak	Spacewatch	3:2	5.7 km	MPC · JPL
368915	2006 UV_{47}	—	October 17, 2006	Kitt Peak	Spacewatch	V	650 m	MPC · JPL
368916	2006 UL_{66}	—	October 16, 2006	Kitt Peak	Spacewatch	MAS	730 m	MPC · JPL
368917	2006 UX_{77}	—	October 17, 2006	Kitt Peak	Spacewatch	NYS	1.3 km	MPC · JPL
368918	2006 UN_{87}	—	October 17, 2006	Mount Lemmon	Mount Lemmon Survey	·	1.1 km	MPC · JPL
368919	2006 UU_{110}	—	October 19, 2006	Kitt Peak	Spacewatch	·	970 m	MPC · JPL
368920	2006 UT_{142}	—	October 4, 2006	Mount Lemmon	Mount Lemmon Survey	·	1.2 km	MPC · JPL
368921	2006 UM_{188}	—	September 17, 2006	Catalina	CSS	·	1.1 km	MPC · JPL
368922	2006 UC_{194}	—	October 20, 2006	Kitt Peak	Spacewatch	MAS	720 m	MPC · JPL
368923	2006 UU_{265}	—	October 27, 2006	Catalina	CSS	·	1.1 km	MPC · JPL
368924	2006 UE_{286}	—	October 28, 2006	Kitt Peak	Spacewatch	3:2 · SHU	4.8 km	MPC · JPL
368925	2006 UU_{323}	—	September 25, 2006	Kitt Peak	Spacewatch	·	1.3 km	MPC · JPL
368926	2006 UF_{329}	—	October 21, 2006	Lulin	Lin, H.-C., Q. Ye	·	930 m	MPC · JPL
368927	2006 VK_{8}	—	November 11, 2006	Kitt Peak	Spacewatch	NYS	1.3 km	MPC · JPL
368928	2006 VG_{36}	—	October 16, 2006	Catalina	CSS	·	1.2 km	MPC · JPL
368929	2006 VC_{42}	—	October 22, 2006	Mount Lemmon	Mount Lemmon Survey	·	1.3 km	MPC · JPL
368930	2006 VS_{43}	—	August 28, 1995	La Silla	C.-I. Lagerkvist	·	1.3 km	MPC · JPL
368931	2006 VS_{46}	—	November 9, 2006	Kitt Peak	Spacewatch	·	1.2 km	MPC · JPL
368932	2006 VN_{53}	—	October 20, 2006	Mount Lemmon	Mount Lemmon Survey	·	1.4 km	MPC · JPL
368933	2006 VU_{69}	—	November 11, 2006	Kitt Peak	Spacewatch	·	1.5 km	MPC · JPL
368934	2006 VY_{99}	—	September 28, 2006	Mount Lemmon	Mount Lemmon Survey	MAS	770 m	MPC · JPL
368935	2006 VM_{123}	—	November 14, 2006	Kitt Peak	Spacewatch	·	800 m	MPC · JPL
368936	2006 VZ_{138}	—	November 15, 2006	Catalina	CSS	·	1.3 km	MPC · JPL
368937	2006 VA_{154}	—	November 8, 2006	Palomar	NEAT	MAS	620 m	MPC · JPL
368938	2006 WF_{4}	—	November 18, 2006	Kitt Peak	Spacewatch	·	1.6 km	MPC · JPL
368939	2006 WS_{107}	—	September 19, 2006	Catalina	CSS	·	1.5 km	MPC · JPL
368940	2006 WW_{107}	—	August 13, 2002	Palomar	NEAT	·	1.3 km	MPC · JPL
368941	2006 WA_{116}	—	November 20, 2006	Kitt Peak	Spacewatch	·	1.2 km	MPC · JPL
368942	2006 WR_{133}	—	November 18, 2006	Mount Lemmon	Mount Lemmon Survey	·	1.2 km	MPC · JPL
368943	2006 WH_{149}	—	November 20, 2006	Kitt Peak	Spacewatch	·	1.5 km	MPC · JPL
368944	2006 WV_{166}	—	November 23, 2006	Kitt Peak	Spacewatch	·	1.3 km	MPC · JPL
368945	2006 WP_{197}	—	November 27, 2006	Mount Lemmon	Mount Lemmon Survey	H	620 m	MPC · JPL
368946	2006 XM_{8}	—	December 9, 2006	Palomar	NEAT	·	1.3 km	MPC · JPL
368947	2006 XD_{60}	—	December 14, 2006	Kitt Peak	Spacewatch	NYS	1.3 km	MPC · JPL
368948	2006 XC_{72}	—	December 14, 2006	Kitt Peak	Spacewatch	·	1.6 km	MPC · JPL
368949	2006 YN	—	December 16, 2006	Palomar	NEAT	AMO	430 m	MPC · JPL
368950	2006 YL_{3}	—	December 16, 2006	Kitt Peak	Spacewatch	MAS	740 m	MPC · JPL
368951	2006 YM_{41}	—	December 22, 2006	Socorro	LINEAR	·	1.1 km	MPC · JPL
368952	2007 AZ	—	January 8, 2007	Mount Lemmon	Mount Lemmon Survey	·	1.2 km	MPC · JPL
368953	2007 AL_{18}	—	January 9, 2007	Catalina	CSS	(5)	1.5 km	MPC · JPL
368954	2007 AF_{19}	—	January 15, 2007	Catalina	CSS	EUN	1.4 km	MPC · JPL
368955	2007 AH_{25}	—	January 15, 2007	Catalina	CSS	·	1.3 km	MPC · JPL
368956	2007 BC_{1}	—	January 16, 2007	Socorro	LINEAR	·	2.6 km	MPC · JPL
368957	2007 BR_{3}	—	January 16, 2007	Socorro	LINEAR	·	1.2 km	MPC · JPL
368958	2007 BV_{3}	—	January 16, 2007	Mount Lemmon	Mount Lemmon Survey	·	1.3 km	MPC · JPL
368959	2007 BY_{4}	—	January 17, 2007	Palomar	NEAT	PHO	1.1 km	MPC · JPL
368960	2007 BE_{29}	—	January 24, 2007	Mount Nyukasa	Japan Aerospace Exploration Agency	·	1.7 km	MPC · JPL
368961	2007 BA_{43}	—	January 9, 2007	Mount Lemmon	Mount Lemmon Survey	·	1.7 km	MPC · JPL
368962	2007 BZ_{43}	—	December 24, 2006	Catalina	CSS	·	1.9 km	MPC · JPL
368963	2007 BG_{44}	—	January 24, 2007	Catalina	CSS	H	560 m	MPC · JPL
368964	2007 BY_{68}	—	January 27, 2007	Mount Lemmon	Mount Lemmon Survey	·	2.6 km	MPC · JPL
368965	2007 BB_{73}	—	January 27, 2007	Siding Spring	SSS	H	890 m	MPC · JPL
368966	2007 BW_{100}	—	January 27, 2007	Kitt Peak	Spacewatch	·	2.3 km	MPC · JPL
368967	2007 BX_{101}	—	January 25, 2007	Catalina	CSS	EUN	1.8 km	MPC · JPL
368968	2007 CO	—	February 5, 2007	Palomar	NEAT	·	1.7 km	MPC · JPL
368969	2007 CB_{5}	—	February 6, 2007	Mount Lemmon	Mount Lemmon Survey	·	2.6 km	MPC · JPL
368970	2007 CX_{7}	—	December 26, 2006	Kitt Peak	Spacewatch	(5)	1.3 km	MPC · JPL
368971	2007 CW_{21}	—	November 1, 2006	Mount Lemmon	Mount Lemmon Survey	·	1.1 km	MPC · JPL
368972	2007 CL_{29}	—	February 6, 2007	Mount Lemmon	Mount Lemmon Survey	·	1.4 km	MPC · JPL
368973	2007 CA_{46}	—	February 10, 2007	Mount Lemmon	Mount Lemmon Survey	·	2.3 km	MPC · JPL
368974	2007 CF_{60}	—	February 10, 2007	Catalina	CSS	JUN	1.2 km	MPC · JPL
368975	2007 CC_{62}	—	January 25, 2007	Catalina	CSS	MAR	1.3 km	MPC · JPL
368976	2007 DT_{20}	—	February 17, 2007	Kitt Peak	Spacewatch	·	2.4 km	MPC · JPL
368977	2007 EL_{7}	—	March 9, 2007	Mount Lemmon	Mount Lemmon Survey	·	2.3 km	MPC · JPL
368978	2007 EZ_{34}	—	February 10, 2007	Catalina	CSS	HNS	1.3 km	MPC · JPL
368979	2007 EQ_{52}	—	March 11, 2007	Catalina	CSS	·	2.6 km	MPC · JPL
368980	2007 EY_{64}	—	March 10, 2007	Kitt Peak	Spacewatch	·	2.0 km	MPC · JPL
368981	2007 EK_{83}	—	February 26, 2007	Mount Lemmon	Mount Lemmon Survey	·	1.7 km	MPC · JPL
368982	2007 EV_{87}	—	March 14, 2007	Catalina	CSS	H	610 m	MPC · JPL
368983	2007 EA_{89}	—	March 9, 2007	Kitt Peak	Spacewatch	·	1.2 km	MPC · JPL
368984	2007 EX_{127}	—	March 9, 2007	Mount Lemmon	Mount Lemmon Survey	·	1.8 km	MPC · JPL
368985	2007 ER_{135}	—	March 10, 2007	Mount Lemmon	Mount Lemmon Survey	PAD	1.7 km	MPC · JPL
368986	2007 EB_{147}	—	May 28, 2003	Kitt Peak	Spacewatch	·	1.7 km	MPC · JPL
368987	2007 EN_{153}	—	March 12, 2007	Mount Lemmon	Mount Lemmon Survey	HYG	3.0 km	MPC · JPL
368988	2007 EB_{159}	—	March 14, 2007	Mount Lemmon	Mount Lemmon Survey	EUN	920 m	MPC · JPL
368989	2007 EC_{169}	—	March 13, 2007	Kitt Peak	Spacewatch	·	1.4 km	MPC · JPL
368990	2007 EA_{170}	—	February 16, 2007	Mount Lemmon	Mount Lemmon Survey	EUN	1.5 km	MPC · JPL
368991	2007 EY_{173}	—	March 14, 2007	Kitt Peak	Spacewatch	AGN	1.2 km	MPC · JPL
368992	2007 EE_{223}	—	March 12, 2007	Kitt Peak	Spacewatch	·	2.8 km	MPC · JPL
368993	2007 FR_{2}	—	March 16, 2007	Catalina	CSS	H	820 m	MPC · JPL
368994	2007 FC_{7}	—	March 16, 2007	Mount Lemmon	Mount Lemmon Survey	·	1.6 km	MPC · JPL
368995	2007 FN_{15}	—	March 18, 2007	Kitt Peak	Spacewatch	(5)	1.2 km	MPC · JPL
368996	2007 FR_{15}	—	March 19, 2007	Anderson Mesa	LONEOS	(18466)	2.9 km	MPC · JPL
368997	2007 FG_{26}	—	March 20, 2007	Mount Lemmon	Mount Lemmon Survey	·	2.4 km	MPC · JPL
368998	2007 GB_{5}	—	April 7, 2007	Bergisch Gladbach	W. Bickel	·	1.8 km	MPC · JPL
368999	2007 GF_{42}	—	April 14, 2007	Kitt Peak	Spacewatch	·	1.5 km	MPC · JPL
369000	2007 GT_{75}	—	April 15, 2007	Kitt Peak	Spacewatch	·	3.7 km	MPC · JPL

back to top

== See also ==
- Meanings of minor-planet names: 368001–369000
