= Meanings of minor-planet names: 368001–369000 =

As minor planet discoveries are confirmed, they are given a permanent number by the IAU's Minor Planet Center (MPC), and the discoverers can then submit names for them, following the IAU's naming conventions. The list below concerns those minor planets in the specified number-range that have received names, and explains the meanings of those names.

Official naming citations of newly named small Solar System bodies are approved and published in a bulletin by IAU's Working Group for Small Bodies Nomenclature (WGSBN). Before May 2021, citations were published in MPC's Minor Planet Circulars for many decades. Recent citations can also be found on the JPL Small-Body Database (SBDB). Until his death in 2016, German astronomer Lutz D. Schmadel compiled these citations into the Dictionary of Minor Planet Names (DMP) and regularly updated the collection.

Based on Paul Herget's The Names of the Minor Planets, Schmadel also researched the unclear origin of numerous asteroids, most of which had been named prior to World War II. This article incorporates text from this source, which is in the public domain: SBDB New namings may only be added to this list below after official publication as the preannouncement of names is condemned. The WGSBN publishes a comprehensive guideline for the naming rules of non-cometary small Solar System bodies.

== 368001–368100 ==
Named minor planet	Provisional	This minor planet was named for...	Ref · Catalog
There are no named minor planets in this number range

== 368101–368200 ==
back to top

Named minor planet	Provisional	This minor planet was named for...	Ref · Catalog
368116 Half-Moon	2013 GU_{92}	Cody Elizabeth Half-Moon, is a Texan known for building campaigns that advance science literacy and advocacy. Her work spans science, cultural institutions, and nonprofits, bringing science into popular culture and public life.	IAU · 368116

== 368201–368300 ==
back to top

Named minor planet	Provisional	This minor planet was named for...	Ref · Catalog
There are no named minor planets in this number range

== 368301–368400 ==
back to top

Named minor planet	Provisional	This minor planet was named for...	Ref · Catalog
There are no named minor planets in this number range

== 368401–368500 ==
back to top

Named minor planet	Provisional	This minor planet was named for...	Ref · Catalog
There are no named minor planets in this number range

== 368501–368600 ==
back to top

Named minor planet	Provisional	This minor planet was named for...	Ref · Catalog
368588 Lazrek	2004 RP_{24}	Mohamed Lazrek (born 1958), a researcher in Cadi Ayyad University's department of physics in Marrakesh.	JPL · 368588

== 368601–368700 ==
back to top

Named minor planet	Provisional	This minor planet was named for...	Ref · Catalog
368617 Sebastiánotero	2004 TM_{10}	Sebastian Otero (born 1973), an active amateur astronomer in Argentina.	JPL · 368617

== 368701–368800 ==
back to top

Named minor planet	Provisional	This minor planet was named for...	Ref · Catalog
368704 Roelgathier	2005 SD_{223}	Roel Gathier (1953–2016) was dedicated to international space research, with outstanding communication and management skills. He played a major role in Dutch and international astronomy, as managing director of SRON Netherlands Institute for Space Research and as chairman of ESA's Science Programme Committee.	JPL · 368704
368719 Asparuh	2005 UT_{12}	Asparuh (640–701), the founder of the Bulgarian country	JPL · 368719

== 368801–368900 ==
back to top

Named minor planet	Provisional	This minor planet was named for...	Ref · Catalog
There are no named minor planets in this number range

== 368901–369000 ==
back to top

Named minor planet	Provisional	This minor planet was named for...	Ref · Catalog
There are no named minor planets in this number range

back to top

Preceded by 367,001–368,000	Meanings of minor-planet names List of minor planets: 368,001–369,000	Succeeded by 369,001–370,000
